= Powerlifting at the Summer Paralympics =

- Governing body: IPC
- Events: 20 (men: 10; women: 10)

Games
- 1960; 1964; 1968; 1972; 1976; 1980; 1984; 1988; 1992; 1996; 2000; 2004; 2008; 2012; 2016; 2020; 2024
- Medalists; Records

Paralympic powerlifting has competed at every Summer Paralympics since 1984. Weightlifting had been on the Paralympic program since 1964; however, after the 1992 Games the IPC decided to drop weightlifting and hold powerlifting events only. Women first competed in the sport at the 2000 Sydney Paralympics.

== Summary ==
Games	Year	Events	Best Nation
1			
2			
3			
4			
5			
6			
7	1984	7	United States
8	1988	9	France / Poland
9	1992	10	Poland
10	1996	10	China
11	2000	20	China
12	2004	20	Egypt
13	2008	20	China
14	2012	20	Nigeria
15	2016	20	Nigeria
16	2020	20	China
17	2024	20	China

== Paralympic records ==
The International Paralympic Committee recognises the heaviest weights lifted in powerlifting events at the Paralympic Games.

=== Men ===
♦ denotes a performance that is also a current world record

Weight class	Record	Athlete	NPC	Games	Date	Ref
49 kg	183 kg	Lê Văn Công	Vietnam	2016 Rio de Janeiro	8 September 2016	
54 kg	200 kg	Rolland Ezuruike	Nigeria	2016 Rio de Janeiro	9 September 2016	
59 kg	♦211 kg	Sherif Othman	Egypt	2016 Rio de Janeiro	9 September 2016	
65 kg	220 kg	Paul Kehinde	Nigeria	2016 Rio de Janeiro	10 September 2016	
72 kg	♦232 kg	Bonnie Bunyau Gustin	Malaysia	2024 Paris	6 September 2024	
80 kg	♦242 kg	Roohallah Rostami	Iran	2024 Paris	6 September 2024	
88 kg	242 kg	Yan Panpan	China	2024 Paris	7 September 2024	
97 kg	♦270 kg	Abdelkareem Khattab	Jordan	2024 Paris	7 September 2024	
107 kg	252 kg	Aliakbar Gharibshahi	Iran	2024 Paris	8 September 2024	
+107 kg	♦310 kg	Siamand Rahman	Iran	2016 Rio de Janeiro	14 September 2016	

=== Women ===
♦ denotes a performance that is also a current world record

Weight class	Record	Athlete	NPC	Games	Date	Ref
41 kg	119 kg	Cui Zhe	China	2024 Paris	4 September 2024	
45 kg	♦123 kg	Guo Lingling	China	2024 Paris	4 September 2024	
50 kg	124 kg	Clara Fuentes	Venezuela	2024 Paris	5 September 2024	
55 kg	130 kg	Amalia Pérez	Mexico	2016 Rio de Janeiro	10 September 2016	
61 kg	♦150 kg	Onyinyechi Mark	Nigeria	2024 Paris	6 September 2024	
67 kg	♦142 kg	Tan Yujiao	China	2024 Paris	6 September 2024	
73 kg	148 kg	Mariana D'Andrea	Brazil	2024 Paris	7 September 2024	
79 kg	♦154 kg	Han Miaoyu	China	2024 Paris	7 September 2024	
86 kg	156 kg	Tayana Medeiros	Brazil	2024 Paris	8 September 2024	
+86 kg	♦167 kg	Folashade Oluwafemiayo	Nigeria	2024 Paris	8 September 2024	

== Medal summary ==
Updated to 2024 Summer Paralympics.

Rank	Nation	Gold	Silver	Bronze	Total
1	China (CHN)	42	34	23	99
2	Nigeria (NGR)	27	17	16	60
3	Egypt (EGY)	24	34	22	80
4	Iran (IRI)	15	10	11	36
5	South Korea (KOR)	7	8	5	20
6	Poland (POL)	7	6	6	19
7	United States (USA)	6	3	5	14
8	France (FRA)	5	8	2	15
9	Mexico (MEX)	5	3	10	18
10	Jordan (JOR)	5	3	2	10
11	Sweden (SWE)	5	0	2	7
12	Great Britain (GBR)	4	7	10	21
13	Ukraine (UKR)	4	3	4	11
14	Brazil (BRA)	3	1	2	6
15	Germany (GER)	3	1	0	4
16	Russia (RUS)	2	7	1	10
17	Turkey (TUR)	2	2	4	8
18	Malaysia (MAS)	2	1	1	4
19	Kazakhstan (KAZ)	2	1	0	3
19	United Arab Emirates (UAE)	2	1	0	3
21	Chinese Taipei (TPE)	2	0	3	5
22	Iraq (IRQ)	1	3	3	7
23	Greece (GRE)	1	1	3	5
24	Vietnam (VIE)	1	1	2	4
25	Mongolia (MGL)	1	1	1	3
26	Finland (FIN)	1	0	1	2
26	Venezuela (VEN)	1	0	1	2
28	Australia (AUS)	0	5	1	6
29	Canada (CAN)	0	3	0	3
30	Thailand (THA)	0	2	4	6
31	Uzbekistan (UZB)	0	2	1	3
32	Hungary (HUN)	0	1	2	3
32	Norway (NOR)	0	1	2	3
34	Belgium (BEL)	0	1	1	2
34	Indonesia (INA)	0	1	1	2
34	Switzerland (SUI)	0	1	1	2
37	Austria (AUT)	0	1	0	1
37	Cuba (CUB)	0	1	0	1
39	Algeria (ALG)	0	0	2	2
39	Colombia (COL)	0	0	2	2
39	Netherlands (NED)	0	0	2	2
42	Azerbaijan (AZE)	0	0	1	1
42	Chile (CHI)	0	0	1	1
42	El Salvador (ESA)	0	0	1	1
42	Georgia (GEO)	0	0	1	1
42	India (IND)	0	0	1	1
42	Italy (ITA)	0	0	1	1
42	Laos (LAO)	0	0	1	1
42	Libya (LBA)	0	0	1	1
42	Philippines (PHI)	0	0	1	1
42	RPC (RPC)	0	0	1	1
42	South Africa (RSA)	0	0	1	1
42	Syria (SYR)	0	0	1	1
Totals (53 entries)		180	175	171	526

== Medalists ==
=== Men's events ===
48 kg

Games	Gold	Silver	Bronze
1992 Barcelona	Monday Emoghawve (NGR)	Jung Yong Kwak (KOR)	Talaat Elsdek (EGY)
1996 Atlanta	Jung Yong Kwak (KOR)	Abraham Obaretin (NGR)	Anthony Peddle (GBR)
2000 Sydney	Anthony Peddle (GBR)	Jung Yong Kwak (KOR)	Thongsa Marasri (THA)
2004 Athens	Morteza Dashti (IRI)	Thongsa Marasri (THA)	Ruel Ishaku (NGR)
2008 Beijing	Ruel Ishaku (NGR)	Omar Qarada (JOR)	Eay Simay (LAO)
2012 London	Yakubu Adesokan (NGR)	Vladimir Balynetc (RUS)	Taha Abdelmagid (EGY)

49 kg

Games	Gold	Silver	Bronze
2016	Lê Văn Công (VIE)	Omar Qarada (JOR)	Nándor Tunkel (HUN)
2020	Omar Qarada (JOR)	Lê Văn Công (VIE)	Parvin Mammadov (AZE)
2024	Omar Qarada (JOR)	Abdullah Kayapınar (TUR)	Lê Văn Công (VIE)

52 kg

Games	Gold	Silver	Bronze
1984	Alfred Dore (USA)	Anthony Griffin (GBR)	None
1988	Kari Ylijoki (FIN)	Jae Youn Kim (KOR)	Raimo Aalto (FIN)
1992	Gomma G. Ahmed (EGY)	Chris O'Neill (USA)	Andrzej Gren (POL)
1996	Keum Jong Jung (KOR)	Jian Wang (CHN)	Johnson Sulola (NGR)
2000	Keum Jong Jung (KOR)	Osama El Sernegawy (EGY)	Jian Wang (CHN)
2004	Osama El Serngawy (EGY)	Guo Jing Wu (CHN)	Gholam Hossein Chaltoukkar (IRI)
2008	Wu Guojing (CHN)	Osama Elserngawy (EGY)	Narong Kasanun (THA)
2012	Feng Qi (CHN)	Ikechukwu Obichukwu (NGR)	Vladimir Krivulya (RUS)

54 kg

Games	Gold	Silver	Bronze
2016	Roland Ezuruike (NGR)	Wang Jian (CHN)	Dimitrios Bakochristos (GRE)
2020	David Degtyarev (KAZ)	Axel Bourlon (FRA)	Dimitrios Bakochristos (GRE)
2024	David Degtyarev (KAZ)	Pablo Ramírez Barrientos (CUB)	Yang Jinglang (CHN)

56 kg

Games	Gold	Silver	Bronze
1988	Sang Jin Yun (KOR)	Young Chung Cho (KOR)	Douglas McDonald (USA)
1992	Sang Jin Youn (KOR)	Krzysztof Owsiany (POL)	Abd Elmonem Farag (EGY)
1996	Gomma G. Ahmed (EGY)	Fereydoun Karimipour (IRI)	Sang Jin Yoon (KOR)
2000	Gomma G. Ahmed (EGY)	Fereydoun Karimipour (IRI)	Stephen Davou (NGR)
2004	Jian Wang (CHN)	Ahmed Ahmed (EGY)	Rajinder Singh Rahelu (IND)
2008	Sherif Othman (EGY)	Rasool Mohsin (IRQ)	Jung Keum-Jong (KOR)
2012	Sherif Othman (EGY)	Anthony Ulonnam (NGR)	Wang Jian (CHN)

59 kg

Games	Gold	Silver	Bronze
2016	Sherif Othman (EGY)	Ali Jawad (GBR)	Yang Quanxi (CHN)
2020	Qi Yongkai (CHN)	Sherif Othman (EGY)	Herbert Aceituno (ESA)
2024	Mohamed Elmenyawy (EGY)	Qi Yongkai (CHN)	Mohsen Bakhtiar (IRI)

60 kg

Games	Gold	Silver	Bronze
1984	Dean Houle (USA)	Patrick Fornet (FRA)	Due a tie, the bronze medal was not awarded
1984	Dean Houle (USA)	Didier Menage (FRA)	Due a tie, the bronze medal was not awarded
1988	Event not contested		
1992	Emadeldin Mohamed (EGY)	Henryk Kohnke (POL)	Dae Heon Shin (KOR)
1996	Monday Emoghavwe (NGR)	Metwaly Mathna (EGY)	Allahbakhsh Akbari (IRI)
2000	Metwaly Mathana (EGY)	Richard Nicholson (AUS)	Taqy Parnian (NED)
2004	Shaban Ibrahim (EGY)	Keum Jong Jung (KOR)	Jian Yu (CHN)
2008	Hamzeh Mohammadi (IRI)	Ayrat Zakiev (RUS)	Shaban Yehia Ibrahim (EGY)
2012	Nader Moradi (IRI)	Ifeanyi Nnajiofor (NGR)	Yang Quanxi (CHN)

65 kg

Games	Gold	Silver	Bronze
2016	Paul Kehinde (NGR)	Hu Peng (CHN)	Shaaban Ibrahim (EGY)
2020	Liu Lei (CHN)	Amir Jafari (IRI)	Hocine Bettir (ALG)
2024	Zou Yi (CHN)	Mark Swan (GBR)	Hocine Bettir (ALG)

67.5

Games	Gold	Silver	Bronze
1984	Michel Abalain (FRA)	None	None
1988	Henryk Kohnke (POL)	Heon Cho Ji (KOR)	David Buterbaugh (USA)
1988	Coed: France Michel Abalain (FRA)	Coed: Daniel Grossenbacher (SUI)	Coed: Mons Skjelvik (NOR)
1992	Ryszard Fornalczyk (POL)	Said M. Abd El Hafez (EGY)	Carl Muylle (BEL)
1996	Hai Dong Zhang (CHN)	Emadeldin Mohamed (EGY)	Zeinal Siavoshani (IRI)
2000	Monday Emoghavwe (NGR)	Shaban Ibrahim (EGY)	Allahbakhsh Akbari (IRI)
2004	Metwaly Mathna (EGY)	Wu Maoshun (CHN)	Hamzeh Mohammadi (IRI)
2008	Metwaly Ibrahim Mathna (EGY)	Ali Hosseini (IRI)	Wu Maoshun (CHN)
2012	Liu Lei (CHN)	Rouhollah Rostami (IRI)	Shaaban Ibrahim (EGY)

72 kg

Games	Gold	Silver	Bronze
2016	Liu Lei (CHN)	Rasool Mohsin (IRQ)	Nnamdi Innocent (NGR)
2020	Bonnie Bunyau Gustin (MAS)	Mahmoud Attia (EGY)	Micky Yule (GBR)
2024	Bonnie Bunyau Gustin (MAS)	Hu Peng (CHN)	Donato Telesca (ITA)

75 kg

Games	Gold	Silver	Bronze
1984	Jonas Oman (SWE)	Juan Dixon (USA)	Keith Bell (GBR)
1988	Donald Deutsch (USA)	Nicholas Slater (GBR)	Myung Sun Shim (KOR)
1992	Kristoffer Hulecki (SWE)	Pierre Vanderheyden (BEL)	Mossad Eleraki (EGY)
1996	Ryszard Fornalczyk (POL)	Jong Park (KOR)	Abd Elmonem Farag (EGY)
2000	Hai Dong Zhang (CHN)	Mansour Dimasi (IRI)	El Sayed Abd El Aal (EGY)
2004	Hai Dong Zhang (CHN)	El Sayed Abd Elaal (EGY)	Reza Boroumand (IRI)
2008	Liu Lei (CHN)	Majid Farzin (IRI)	Mu'taz Aljuneidi (JOR)
2012	Ali Hosseini (IRI)	Mohamed Elelfat (EGY)	Hu Peng (CHN)

80 kg

Games	Gold	Silver	Bronze
2016	Majid Farzin (IRI)	Gu Xiaofei (CHN)	Akhror Bozorov (UZB)
2020	Rouhollah Rostami (IRI)	Gu Xiaofei (CHN)	Mohamed Elelfat (EGY)
2024	Rouhollah Rostami (IRI)	Gu Xiaofei (CHN)	Rasool Mohsin (IRQ)

82.5

Games	Gold	Silver	Bronze
1984	Roland Isaksson (SWE)	Al Slater (CAN)	Tom Becke (USA)
1988	Miroslaw Maliszewski (POL)	Michael Johnson (CAN)	Lynn Whiteman (USA)
1992	Bernd Vogel (GER)	Frank Gyland (NOR)	Miroslaw Maliszewski (POL)
1996	Bernd Vogel (GER)	Mostafa Hamed (EGY)	Jiahua Zhou (CHN)
2000	Jong Chul Park (KOR)	Saeid Bafandeh (IRI)	Mostafa Hamed (EGY)
2004	Mohammed Khamis Khalaf (UAE)	Mostafa Hamed (EGY)	Thaair Hussin (IRQ)
2008	Zhang Haidong (CHN)	Pavlos Mamalos (GRE)	Thaer Al-Ali (IRQ)
2012	Majid Farzin (IRI)	Gu Xiaofei (CHN)	Metwaly Mathana (EGY)

88 kg

Games	Gold	Silver	Bronze
2016	Mohammed Khamis Khalaf (UAE)	Evânio da Silva (BRA)	Sodnompiljee Enkhbayar (MGL)
2020	Abdelkareem Khattab (JOR)	Ye Jixiong (CHN)	Hany Abdelhady (EGY)
2024	Yan Panpan (CHN)	Mohamed Elelfatg (EGY)	Yuri Babnets (UKR)

90 kg

Games	Gold	Silver	Bronze
1984	Daniel Hardy (FRA)	Gino Vendetti (CAN)	None
1988	Bernard Barberet (FRA)	Kyung Chung Choi (KOR)	Fred MacKenzi (GBR)
1992	Ryszard Tomaszewski (POL)	Nicholas Slater (GBR)	Janusz Sala (POL)
1996	Ryszard Tomaszewski (POL)	Brian McNicholl (AUS)	Frank Gyland (NOR)
2000	Bernd Vogel (GER)	Abd Elmonem Farag (EGY)	Ya Dong Wu (CHN)
2004	Jong Chul Park (KOR)	Ryszard Rogala (POL)	Ya Dong Wu (CHN)
2008	Cai Huichao (CHN)	Mohammed Khamis Khalaf (UAE)	Ryszard Rogala (POL)
2012	Hany Abdelhady (EGY)	Cai Huichao (CHN)	Pavlos Mamalos (GRE)

97 kg

Games	Gold	Silver	Bronze
2016	Mohamed Eldib (EGY)	Qi Dong (CHN)	José de Jesus Castillo Castillo (MEX)
2020	Yan Panpan (CHN)	Hamed Solhipour (IRI)	Fabio Torres (COL)
2024	Abdelkareem Khattab (JOR)	Ye Jixiong (CHN)	Fabio Torres (COL)

+90 kg

Games	Gold	Silver	Bronze
1984	Charles Reid (USA)	Manfred Atteneder (AUT)	None

100 kg

Games	Gold	Silver	Bronze
1988	Arne Karlsson (SWE)	Matthew Poble (AUS)	Michael Farrell (AUS)
1992	Krzysztof Palubicki (POL)	Jean-Luc Darrondeau (FRA)	Tommy Leck (SWE)
1996	Zhiqiang Luo (CHN)	Sherif Bakr (EGY)	Patrick Akutaekwe (NGR)
2000	Amrollah Dehghani (IRI)	Sherif Bakr (EGY)	Nicholas Slater (GBR)
2004	Kazem Rajabi (IRI)	Solomon Ikechukwu Amarakuo (NGR)	Li Bing (CHN)
2008	Qi Dong (CHN)	Obioma Daleth Aligekwe (NGR)	Ali Sadeghzadeh (IRI)
2012	Mohamed Eldib (EGY)	Qi Dong (CHN)	Ali Sadeghzadeh (IRI)

107 kg

Games	Gold	Silver	Bronze
2016	Pavlos Mamalos (GRE)	Mohamed Ahmed (EGY)	Ali Sadeghzadeh (IRI)
2020	Enkhbayaryn Sodnompiljee (MGL)	Jong Yee Khie (MAS)	Saman Razi (IRI)
2024	Ahmad Aminzadeh (IRI)	Enkhbayaryn Sodnompiljee (MGL)	José de Jesus Castillo Castillo (MEX)

+100 kg

Games	Gold	Silver	Bronze
1988	Anthony Bishop (GBR)	Istvan Nanasi (HUN)	Nils Karreberg (SWE)
1992	Bengt Lindberg (SWE)	Mohamed Sarhan (EGY)	Alfredo Battistini (SUI)
1996	Kim Brownfield (USA)	Leszek Hallmann (POL)	Pernell Cooper (USA)
2000	Pernell Cooper (USA)	Kim Brownfield (USA)	Abdelrahim Hamed (LBA)
2004	Habibollah Mousavi (IRI)	Faris Abed (IRQ)	Darren Gardiner (AUS)
2008	Kazem Rajabi (IRI)	Darren Gardiner (AUS)	Li Bing (CHN)
2012	Siamand Rahman (IRI)	Faris Al-Ajeeli (IRQ)	Chun Keun-Bae (KOR)

+107 kg

Games	Gold	Silver	Bronze
2016	Siamand Rahman (IRI)	Amr Mosaad (EGY)	Jamil Elshebli (JOR)
2020	Jamil Elshebli (JOR)	Mansour Pourmirzaei (IRI)	Faris Al-Ajeeli (IRQ)
2024	Ahmad Aminzadeh (IRI)	Anton Kryukov (UKR)	Akaki Jintcharadze (GEO)

=== Women's events ===
40 kg

Games	Gold	Silver	Bronze
2000 Sydney	Bian Jianxin (CHN)	Lidiya Solovyova (UKR)	Laura Cerero Gabriel (MEX)
2004 Athens	Lidiya Solovyova (UKR)	Ijeoma John (NGR)	Laura Cerero Gabriel (MEX)
2008 Beijing	Lidiya Solovyova (UKR)	Cui Zhe (CHN)	Laura Cerero Gabriel (MEX)
2012 London	Nazmiye Muslu (TUR)	Cui Zhe (CHN)	Zoe Newson (GBR)

41 kg

Games	Gold	Silver	Bronze
2016	Nazmiye Muratlı (TUR)	Cui Zhe (CHN)	Ni Nengah Widiasih (INA)
2020	Guo Lingling (CHN)	Ni Nengah Widiasih (INA)	Clara Fuentes Monasterio (VEN)
2024	Cui Zue (CHN)	Esther Nworgu (NGR)	Lara Aparecida Lima (BRA)

44 kg

Games	Gold	Silver	Bronze
2000 Sydney	Fatma Omar (EGY)	Lucy Ejike (NGR)	Li Hua Lu (TPE)
2004 Athens	Lucy Ogechukwu Ejike (NGR)	Gihan El-Aziz Baioumy (EGY)	Xiao Cuijuan (CHN)
2008 Beijing	Xiao Cuijuan (CHN)	Justyna Kozdryk (POL)	Zeinab Sayed Oteify (EGY)
2012 London	Ivory Nwokorie (NGR)	Çiğdem Dede (TUR)	Lidiia Soloviova (UKR)

45 kg

Games	Gold	Silver	Bronze
2016	Hu Dandan (CHN)	Latifat Tijani (NGR)	Zoe Newson (GBR)
2020	Guo Lingling (CHN)	Ni Nengah Widiasih (INA)	Clara Monasterio (COL)
2024	Guo Lingling (CHN)	Zoe Newson (GBR)	Nazmiye Muslu Muratlı (TUR)

48 kg

Games	Gold	Silver	Bronze
2000	Iyabo Ismaila (NGR)	Abir Ibrahim Aly Nail (EGY)	Xia Zhang (CHN)
2004	Bian Jianxin (CHN)	Amalia Pérez (MEX)	Olena Kiseolar (UKR)
2008	Lucy Ogechukwu Ejike (NGR)	Olesya Lafina (RUS)	Souhad Ghazouani (FRA)
2012	Esther Oyema (NGR)	Olesya Lafina (RUS)	Shi Shanshan (CHN)

50 kg

Games	Gold	Silver	Bronze
2016	Lidiia Soloviova (UKR)	Rehab Ahmed (EGY)	Đặng Thị Linh Phượng (VIE)
2020	Hu Dandan (CHN)	Rehab Ahmed (EGY)	Olivia Broome (GBR)
2024	Clara Monasterio (COL)	Xiao Jinping (CHN)	Olivia Broome (GBR)

52 kg

Games	Gold	Silver	Bronze
2000	Tamara Podpalnaya (RUS)	Amalia Pérez (MEX)	Patricia Nnaji (NGR)
2004	Tamara Podpalnaya (RUS)	Abir Nail (EGY)	Yan Yang (CHN)
2008	Amalia Pérez (MEX)	Tamara Podpalnaya (RUS)	Samkhoun Anon (THA)
2012	Joy Onaolapo (NGR)	Tamara Podpalnaya (RUS)	Xiao Cuijuan (CHN)

55 kg

Games	Gold	Silver	Bronze
2016	Amalia Pérez (MEX)	Esther Oyema (NGR)	Xiao Cuijuan (CHN)
2020	Mariana Shevchuk (UKR)	Xiao Cuijuan (CHN)	Besra Duman (TUR)
2024	Rehab Ahmed (EGY)	Besra Duman (TUR)	Kamolpan Kraratpet (THA)

56 kg

Games	Gold	Silver	Bronze
2000	Taoying Fu (CHN)	Somkhoun Anon (THA)	Moekie Grobbelaar (RSA)
2004	Fatma Omar (EGY)	Patience Aghimile Igbiti (NGR)	Zhenling Huo (CHN)
2008	Fatma Omar (EGY)	Irina Kazantseva (RUS)	Lee Chan Siow (MAS)
2012	Fatma Omar (EGY)	Lucy Ejike (NGR)	Özlem Becerikli (TUR)

60 kg

Games	Gold	Silver	Bronze
2000	Victoria Nneji (NGR)	Yu Zuo (CHN)	Lyudmyla Osmanova (UKR)
2004	Taoying Fu (CHN)	Souhad Ghazouani (FRA)	Amany Aly (EGY)
2008	Bian Jianxin (CHN)	Amal Mahmoud Osman (EGY)	Patience Aghimile Igbiti (NGR)
2012	Amalia Pérez (MEX)	Yang Yan (CHN)	Amal Mahmoud (EGY)

61 kg

Games	Gold	Silver	Bronze
2016	Lucy Ejike (NGR)	Fatma Omar (EGY)	Yan Yang (CHN)
2020	Amalia Pérez (MEX)	Ruza Kuzieva (UZB)	Lucy Ejike (NGR)
2024	Onyinyechi Mark (NGR)	Cui Jianjin (CHN)	Amalia Pérez (MEX)

67 kg

Games	Gold	Silver	Bronze
2016	Tan Yujiao (CHN)	Raushan Koishibayeva (KAZ)	Amal Mahmoud (EGY)
2020	Tan Yujiao (CHN)	Fatma Omar (EGY)	Olaitan Ibrahim (NGR)
2024	Tan Yujiao (CHN)	Fatma Elyan (EGY)	Maria de Fátima Costa (BRA)

67.5

Games	Gold	Silver	Bronze
2000	Patricia Okafor (NGR)	Mingxia Zhu (CHN)	Nadia Mohamed Ali (EGY)
2004	Heba Ahmed (EGY)	Li Ping Zhang (CHN)	Catalina Diaz Vilchis (MEX)
2008	Fu Taoying (CHN)	Amoge Victoria Nneji (NGR)	Rasha Alshikh (SYR)
2012	Souhad Ghazouani (FRA)	Tan Yujiao (CHN)	Victoria Nneji (NGR)

73 kg

Games	Gold	Silver	Bronze
2016	Ndidi Nwosu (NGR)	Souhad Ghazouani (FRA)	Amany Ali (EGY)
2020	Mariana D'Andrea (BRA)	Lili Xu (CHN)	Souhad Ghazouani (FRA)
2024	Mariana D'Andrea (BRA)	Roza Koziyeva (UZB)	Sibel Çam (TUR)

75 kg

Games	Gold	Silver	Bronze
2000	Rui Fang Li (CHN)	Patricia Barcena (MEX)	Kike Adedeji Ogunbamowo (NGR)
2004	Lin Tzu-hui (TPE)	Mingxia Zhu (CHN)	Kike Adedeji Ogunbamowo (NGR)
2008	Lin Tzu-hui (TPE)	Randa Tageldin Mohamed (EGY)	Zhang Liping (CHN)
2012	Fu Taoying (CHN)	Folashade Oluwafemiayo (NGR)	Lin Tzu-hui (TPE)

79 kg

Games	Gold	Silver	Bronze
2016	Bose Omolayo (NGR)	Xu Lili (CHN)	Lin Tzu-hui (TPE)
2020	Bose Omolayo (NGR)	Natalia Oleynik (UKR)	Vera Muratova (RPC)
2024	Han Miaoyu (CHN)	Bose Omolayo (NGR)	Safaa Hassana (EGY)

82.5 kg

Games	Gold	Silver	Bronze
2000	Emma Brown (GBR)	Hend Abd Elaty (EGY)	Adeline Dumapong (PHI)
2004	Emma Brown (GBR)	Carine Burgy (FRA)	Hend Abd Elaty (EGY)
2008	Heba Said Ahmed (EGY)	Zuo Jue (CHN)	Perla Patricia Barcenas (MEX)
2012	Loveline Obiji (NGR)	Randa Mahmoud (EGY)	Xu Yanmei (CHN)

86 kg

Games	Gold	Silver	Bronze
2016	Randa Mahmoud (EGY)	Tharwat Alhajjaj (JOR)	Catalina Diaz Vilchis (MEX)
2020	Folashade Oluwafemiayo (NGR)	Zheng Feifei (CHN)	Louise Sugden (GBR)
2024	Tayana Medeiros (BRA)	Zheng Feifei (CHN)	Marion Serrano (CHI)

+82.5

Games	Gold	Silver	Bronze
2000	Ping Cao (CHN)	Carine Burgy (FRA)	Faith Igbinehin (NGR)
2004	Rui Fang Li (CHN)	Nadia Fekry (EGY)	Ebere Grace Anozie (NGR)
2008	Li Ruifang (CHN)	Grace Ebere Anozie (NGR)	Nadia Mohamed Ali (EGY)
2012	Grace Anozie (NGR)	Heba Ahmed (EGY)	Perla Bárcenas (MEX)

+86 kg

Games	Gold	Silver	Bronze
2016	Josephine Orji (NGR)	Marzena Zięba (POL)	Melaica Tuinfort (NED)
2020	Deng Xuemei (CHN)	Loveline Obiji (NGR)	Marzena Zięba (POL)
2024	Folashade Oluwafemiayo (NGR)	Deng Xuemei (CHN)	Nadia Ali (EGY)

== Nations ==
Nation	60	64	68	72	76	80	84	88	92	96	00	04	08	12	16	20	24	Total
Afghanistan (AFG)													1	1				2
Algeria (ALG)											2	2			2			3
Argentina (ARG)														1	1			2
Armenia (ARM)										1	1	1	1	1	1			6
Australia (AUS)								2		3	13	4	3	2				6
Austria (AUT)							1	2			1							3
Azerbaijan (AZE)										1	3	1	3	2	2			6
Bahrain (BRN)										2	1	2	1					4
Belarus (BLR)										1	1	3		1				4
Belgium (BEL)								2	7	2								3
Benin (BEN)												1	1					2
Brazil (BRA)										1	3	2	4	4	5			6
Bulgaria (BUL)									2	1		3	2					4
Burkina Faso (BUR)										1	1							2
Cameroon (CMR)														1				1
Canada (CAN)							2	1	1	2	2	2						6
Cape Verde (CPV)												1						1
Central African Republic (CAF)												1						1
Chile (CHI)									1	1	2				3			4
China (CHN)									1	5	18	19	16	16	16			7
Chinese Taipei (TPE)										1	8	3	3	2	2			6
Colombia (COL)													1	1	2			3
Cuba (CUB)									1			2	2	2	2			5
Czech Republic (CZE)													1					1
Timor-Leste (TLS)													1					1
Ecuador (ECU)											1	3	2	1				4
Egypt (EGY)									10	9	19	16	14	15	17			7
El Salvador (ESA)															1			1
Estonia (EST)										1		1						2
Finland (FIN)								3	6	4	2		2		1			6
France (FRA)							4	3	6	7	8	3	4	2	2			9
Georgia (GEO)													1	1	1			3
Germany (GER)									2	3	3	2	1	1				6
Ghana (GHA)												1		1	1			3
Great Britain (GBR)							2	7	4	4	8	5	4	5	4			9
Greece (GRE)											2	7	5	2	6			5
Haiti (HAI)													1					1
Honduras (HON)															1			1
Hong Kong (HKG)													1					1
Hungary (HUN)								1	4	1	2	2		2	4			7
Iceland (ISL)													1					1
Individual Paralympic Athletes (IPA)											1							1
India (IND)									1	1	2	2	2	3	1			7
Indonesia (INA)								3		1	1		1	1	2			6
Iran (IRI)								1		6	7	8	7	8	6			7
Iraq (IRQ)												4	6	6	2			4
Ireland (IRL)														1				1
Israel (ISR)									2	2	1							3
Italy (ITA)															2			1
Ivory Coast (CIV)												1	1	2	1			4
Japan (JPN)										1	1	1	1	3	3			6
Jordan (JOR)										1	3	3	4	2	6			6
Kazakhstan (KAZ)										1	1	1	1	2	3			6
Kenya (KEN)											1	1	1		1			4
Kuwait (KUW)									3	2	5	1	1					5
Kyrgyzstan (KGZ)										2	2	3	1	1	2			6
Laos (LAO)											2		1	1	1			4
Latvia (LAT)													1					1
Liberia (LBR)														1				1
Libya (LBA)										4	2	3	1	1	2			6
Lithuania (LTU)												1						1
Malaysia (MAS)										2	5	8	4	3	2			6
Mali (MLI)											1							1
Mauritania (MTN)											1							1
Mexico (MEX)										2	9	8	6	6	7			6
Moldova (MDA)										2		1	1	2	1			5
Mongolia (MGL)															1			1
Morocco (MAR)										2	5	4	4	3	1			6
Namibia (NAM)												1		1	1			3
Netherlands (NED)										1	2				1			3
New Zealand (NZL)									1		2	1	1					4
Nicaragua (NCA)															1			1
Niger (NIG)													1					1
Nigeria (NGR)									2	5	18	10	8	16	13			7
Norway (NOR)								2	2	2	2	1						5
Oman (OMA)										1	2	2	1	1				5
Pakistan (PAK)											1		1					2
Papua New Guinea (PNG)											1			1				2
Peru (PER)										1	1	1	1					4
Philippines (PHI)											1	2	1	3	2			5
Poland (POL)								2	11	10	9	10	10	6	6			8
Qatar (QAT)										1	2	1	1					4
Romania (ROU)										1	1	1	1					4
Russia (RUS)										4	10	7	9	13				5
Rwanda (RWA)														1				1
Saudi Arabia (KSA)										2		4	1	1				4
Serbia (SRB)															1			1
Slovakia (SVK)										1	3	3	2	1	1			6
South Africa (RSA)											2	4	1		1			4
South Korea (KOR)								7	6	7	6	9	4	4	4			8
Spain (ESP)									3	2	1	1	1	1	1			7
Sri Lanka (SRI)											1	1	1					3
Sweden (SWE)							2	6	10	3	1							5
Switzerland (SUI)										1								1
Syria (SYR)										2	4	5	4	3	1			6
Tajikistan (TJK)												1	1	1				3
Thailand (THA)										1	6	4	7	4	2			6
Togo (TOG)															1			1
Tunisia (TUN)											1							1
Turkey (TUR)												2	3	6	3			4
Turkmenistan (TKM)											1	4	3	4	2			5
Uganda (UGA)										1		1	1					3
Ukraine (UKR)										3	8	7	7	6	9			6
Unified Team (EUN)									2									1
United Arab Emirates (UAE)										1	2	1	1	2	3			6
United States (USA)							5	9	16	10	12	3	2	2	1			9
Uzbekistan (UZB)												1	1	2	2			4
Vanuatu (VAN)													1					1
Venezuela (VEN)										2	6	3	2	1	1			6
Vietnam (VIE)											1	2	3	4	4			5
Nations							6	16	23	56	67	69	74	61	60			
Competitors							16	52	106	141	258	229	203	194	179			
Year	60	64	68	72	76	80	84	88	92	96	00	04	08	12	16	20		

== See also ==
- Weightlifting at the Summer Olympics
- World Para Powerlifting Championships
