= Egypt at the 2020 Summer Paralympics =

- IPC code: EGY
- NPC: Egyptian Paralympic Committee
- Website: paralympic.org.eg

in Tokyo, Japan
- Competitors: 49 in 8 sports
- Medals: Gold 0 Silver 5 Bronze 2 Total 7

Summer Paralympics appearances (overview)
- 1972; 1976; 1980; 1984; 1988; 1992; 1996; 2000; 2004; 2008; 2012; 2016; 2020; 2024

Egypt competed at the 2020 Summer Paralympics in Tokyo, Japan from 25 August to 6 September. This was Egypt's thirteenth appearance at the Summer Paralympics.

== Medalists ==
Medal	Name	Sport	Event	Date
Silver	Sherif Othman	Powerlifting	Men's 59 kg	27 August
Silver	Rehab Ahmed	Powerlifting	Women's 50 kg	27 August
Silver	Mahmoud Attia	Powerlifting	Men's 72 kg	28 August
Silver	Fatma Omar	Powerlifting	Women's 67 kg	28 August
Silver	Mohamed El-Zayat	Taekwondo	Men's 61 kg	2 September
Bronze	Mohamed Elelfat	Powerlifting	Men's 80 kg	28 August
Bronze	Hany Abdelhady	Powerlifting	Men's 88 kg	29 August

== Competitors ==
The following is the list of number of competitors participating in the Games:

Sport	Men	Women	Total
Athletics	2	1	3
Badminton	1	0	1
Goalball	0	6	6
Powerlifting	7	8	15
Sitting Volleyball	12	0	12
Swimming	2	2	4
Table Tennis	4	2	6
Taekwondo	1	1	2
Total	29	20	49

== Athletics ==
Athlete	Event	Final	
Athlete	Event	Result	Rank
Men
Hamada Hassan	High jump T63	1.69	8
Mohamed Mohamed Ramadan	Discus throw F37		
Women
Dina Zamly Ali	400 metres T37	1:17.73	7

== Badminton ==
Athlete	Event	Group Stage				Semifinal	Final / BM	
Athlete	Event	Opposition Score	Opposition Score	Opposition Score	Rank	Opposition Score	Opposition Score	Rank
Ahmed Eldakrory	Men's singles SU5	Cheah (MAS); L (3–21, 2–21)	Imai (JPN); L (5–21, 4–21)	Fang (TPE); L (6–21, 2–21)	4	Did not advance		

== Goalball ==
With the withdrawal of the Algeria women's team by 21 April 2021, the International Paralympic Committee selected Egypt as a replacement. A goalball team has up to six players, separate to team staff (of which, up to three may be on the team bench as well).

=== Women ===
The following is the Egypt roster in the women's goalball tournament of the 2020 Summer Paralympics.

No.	Player	Class	Date of birth (age)
1	Hanan Tolba	B1	20 November 1995 (aged 25)
2	Esraa Walid Ezzeldin	B2	27 July 2002 (aged 19)
3	Gehad Ezzeldin	B2	8 July 1999 (aged 22)
4	Israa Gadalla	B2	1 March 2003 (aged 18)
5	Hassnaa Elgabry	B2	4 March 1996 (aged 25)
6	Aya Ahmed	B1	6 December 1995 (aged 25)

Group stage

Pos	Team	Pld	W	D	L	GF	GA	GD	Pts	Qualification
1	Turkey	4	3	0	1	30	11	+19	9	Quarterfinals
2	United States	4	3	0	1	22	10	+12	9	Quarterfinals
3	Japan (H)	4	2	1	1	18	13	+5	7	Quarterfinals
4	Brazil	4	1	1	2	23	19	+4	4	Quarterfinals
5	Egypt	4	0	0	4	3	43	−40	0	

Source: TOCOG
Rules for classification: 1) points; 2) goal difference; 3) number of wins; 4) goals against; 5) head-to-head goal difference.
(H) Hosts

26 August 2021; 14:45	Egypt	2–12	Turkey	Makuhari Messe, Tokyo; Referees: Raquel Gomez Aguado (Spain), Raili Sipura (Finland)
26 August 2021; 14:45	Elgabry 1 Ezzeldin 1	Report	Sevd. Altunoluk 8 Sevt. Altunoluk 2 Güler 1 Çelik 1	Makuhari Messe, Tokyo; Referees: Raquel Gomez Aguado (Spain), Raili Sipura (Finland)

27 August 2021
19:00

United States	10–0	Egypt
Dennis 1', 4', 5', 6'; Czechowski 5', 12'; Mason 7', 8'; Miller 11', 15'	Report

Makuhari Messe, Tokyo
Referee: Vaida Pokvytytė (Lithuania), Bas Spaans (Netherlands)

29 August 2021
10:30

Egypt	0–10	Japan
	Report	Hagiwara 1', 1', 5', 6', 7', 8', 8'; Kakehata 1', 6', 7'

Makuhari Messe, Tokyo
Referee: Woradet Kultawongwattana (Thailand), Svitlana Moroz (Ukraine)

30 August 2021
10:30

Brazil	11–1	Egypt
Gomes 1', 6', 7', 9', 11', 12', 15', 16'; Ferreira 13', 14'; Custodio 15'	Report	Elgabry 12'

Makuhari Messe, Tokyo
Referee: Launel Scott (Canada), Woradet Kultawongwattana (Thailand)

== Powerlifting ==
Number	Athlete	Event	Result	Rank
Men
1	Taha Abdelmajid	−54 kg	164	4
2	Sherif Othman	−59 kg	187	2nd place, silver medalist(s)
3	Mahmoud Attia	−72 kg	191	2nd place, silver medalist(s)
4	Mohamed Elelfat	−80 kg	212	3rd place, bronze medalist(s)
5	Hany Abdelhady	−88 kg	214	3rd place, bronze medalist(s)
6	Mohamed Ahmed	−97 kg	200	6
7	Amr Mosaad	+107 kg	206	6
Women
8	Rehab Ahmed	−50 kg	120	2nd place, silver medalist(s)
9	Gihan Abdelaziz	−55 kg	100	7
10	Fatma Korany	−61 kg	127	4
11	Fatma Omar	−67 kg	120	2nd place, silver medalist(s)
12	Amal Mahmoud	−73 kg	131	4
13	Gehan Hassan	−79 kg	110	6
14	Amany Ali	−86 kg	131	4
15	Randa Mahmoud	+86 kg	128	5

== Sitting volleyball ==
Egyptian men's sitting volleyball team qualified for the 2020 Summer Paralympics after winning at the 2019 ParaVolley Africa Zonal Championships.

Summary

Team	Event	Group stage				Semifinal	Final / BM / Cl.	
Team	Event	Opposition Score	Opposition Score	Opposition Score	Rank	Opposition Score	Opposition Score	Rank
Egypt men's	Men's tournament	Bosnia and Herzegovina; L 0–3	Japan; W 3–0	RPC; L 0–3	3	Did not advance	Fifth place match Germany; W 3–2	5

=== Men's tournament ===
Group play

Pos	Team	Pld	W	L	Pts	SW	SL	SR	SPW	SPL	SPR	Qualification
1	RPC (RPC)	3	3	0	3	9	0	MAX	225	151	1.490	Semifinals
2	Bosnia and Herzegovina	3	2	1	2	6	3	2.000	205	176	1.165	Semifinals
3	Egypt	3	1	2	1	3	6	0.500	193	174	1.109	Fifth place match
4	Japan	3	0	3	0	0	9	0.000	103	225	0.458	Seventh place match

Source: TOCOG

27 August 2021; 22:00 v	Egypt	0–3	Bosnia and Herzegovina	Makuhari Messe, Tokyo; Referees: Andre Calado (BRA), Neal Konowalyk (CAN)
27 August 2021; 22:00 v	(23–25, 22–25, 15–25); Results Statistics			Makuhari Messe, Tokyo; Referees: Andre Calado (BRA), Neal Konowalyk (CAN)

29 August 2021; 18:30 v	Japan	0–3	Egypt	Makuhari Messe, Tokyo; Referees: Marie-Claude Richer (CAN), Huang Xiao (CHN)
29 August 2021; 18:30 v	(11–25, 7–25, 6–25); Results Statistics			Makuhari Messe, Tokyo; Referees: Marie-Claude Richer (CAN), Huang Xiao (CHN)

31 August 2021; 10:00 v	Egypt	0–3	RPC (RPC)	Makuhari Messe, Tokyo; Referees: Dominik Raca (CRO), Ute Fischer (GER)
31 August 2021; 10:00 v	(21–25, 17–25, 20–25); Results Statistics			Makuhari Messe, Tokyo; Referees: Dominik Raca (CRO), Ute Fischer (GER)

Fifth place match

2 September 2021; 15:30 v	Egypt	3–2	Germany	Makuhari Messe, Tokyo; Referees: Kim Jong-heun (KOR), Marie-Claude Richer (CAN)
2 September 2021; 15:30 v	(25–23, 24–26, 25–18, 22–25, 15–8); Results Statistics			Makuhari Messe, Tokyo; Referees: Kim Jong-heun (KOR), Marie-Claude Richer (CAN)

== Swimming ==
Three Egyptian swimmers have successfully entered the Paralympic Games slot after breaking the minimum qualification score (MQS).

Athlete	Event	Heats		Final	
Athlete	Event	Result	Rank	Result	Rank
Men
Youssef Elsayed	50m freestyle S3				
Youssef Elsayed	200m freestyle S3				
Youssef Elsayed	150m individual medley SM3		11	Did Not Advance	
Zeyad Kahil	200m freestyle S5		11	Did Not Advance	
Zeyad Kahil	100m breaststroke SB4		11	Did Not Advance	
Women
Malak Abdelshafi	100m breaststroke SB4		8		8
Ayaallah Tewfick	50m freestyle S6		13	Did Not Advance	
Ayaallah Tewfick	400m freestyle S6				
Mixed
Egypt	Mixed 4x50m Freestyle Relay - 20 Points		12	Did Not Advance	

== Table tennis ==
Egypt has entered six athletes into the table tennis competition at the Games. All of them qualified from 2019 ITTF African Para Championships which was held in Alexandria, Egypt.

Athlete	Event	Group Stage				Round of 16	Quarterfinals	Semifinals	Final	
Athlete	Event	Opposition Result	Opposition Result	Opposition Result	Rank	Opposition Result	Opposition Result	Opposition Result	Opposition Result	Rank
Men
Sameh Mohamed Eid Saleh	Individual C4	Thomas (FRA); L 1–3	Ogunkunle (NGR); W 3–1	—N/a	2 Q	Astan (INA); W 3–2	Kim (KOR); L 0–3	did not advance		
Ayman Zenaty	Individual C5	Baus (GER); L 0–3	Öztürk (TUR); L 0–3	—N/a	3	did not advance				
Ibrahim Hamadtou	Individual C6	Park (KOR); L 0–3	Chen (CHN); L 0–3	—N/a	3	did not advance				
Sayed Youssef	Individual C7	Ballestrino (AUS); W 3–1	Stroh (BRA); L 1–3	Inoue (JPN); W 3–0	2 Q	Yagi (JPN); W 3–1	Yan (CHN); L 1–3	did not advance		
Mohamed Sameh Eid Saleh; Ayman Zenaty	Team C4–5	—N/a								
Ibrahim Hamadtou; Sayed Youssef	Team C6–7	—N/a								
Women
Faiza Mahmoud	Individual C5	Zhang (CHN); L 0–3	Lundback (SWE); L 0–3	—N/a	3	did not advance				
Hanna Hammad	Individual C6	Lytovchenko (UKR); L 0–3	Julian (AUS); L 0–3	—N/a	3	did not advance				

== Taekwondo ==
Egypt qualified two athletes to compete at the Paralympics competition. All of them are confirmed to compete after winning the gold medal at the 2020 African Qualification Tournament in Rabat, Morocco.

Athlete	Event	First round	Quarterfinals	Semifinals	Final
Athlete	Event	Opposition Result	Opposition Result	Opposition Result	Rank
Mohamed El-Zayat	Men's –61 kg				
Salma Ali Abd Al Moneem Hassan	Women's –58 kg				

== See also ==
- Egypt at the Paralympics
- Egypt at the 2020 Summer Olympics
