= Egypt at the 2000 Summer Paralympics =

- IPC code: EGY
- NPC: Egyptian Paralympic Committee
- Website: paralympic.org.eg

in Sydney
- Competitors: 45 (33 male, 12 female)
- Medals Ranked 23rd: Gold 6 Silver 12 Bronze 10 Total 28

Summer Paralympics appearances (overview)
- 1972; 1976; 1980; 1984; 1988; 1992; 1996; 2000; 2004; 2008; 2012; 2016; 2020; 2024

Egypt sent a delegation to compete at the 2000 Summer Paralympics in Sydney, Australia. Egyptian athletes won six gold medals, twelve silver and ten bronze, enabling their country to finish 23rd out of 123 on the medal table. Athletics and powerlifting were equally successful, with each sport giving 3 gold medals each to Egypt.

== Background ==
The Egyptian team included 45 sportspeople, 12 women and 33 men. This was 7 more women than the country had sent to Atlanta for the 1996 Games. General Union of Sports Clubs for the Disabled had served as Egypt's NPC since 1982. In 1998, two years before the Sydney Games, it was replaced by the Egyptian Disabled Sports Federation as a result of President of the Council of Ministers Order No. (659).

== Medals ==
Egypt finished the Sydney hosted Games with 28 totals medals, 6 gold, 12 silver and 10 bronze, enabling their country to finish 23rd out of 123 on the medal table.

Medal	Name	Sport	Event
Gold	Mahmoud Elatar	Athletics	Men's discus F58
Gold	Mahmoud Elatar	Athletics	Men's javelin F58
Gold	Ibrahim Allam	Athletics	Men's shot put F58
Gold	Gomma G. Ahmed	Powerlifting	Men's -56 kg
Gold	Metwaly Mathana	Powerlifting	Men's -60 kg
Gold	Fatma Omar	Powerlifting	Women's -44 kg
Silver	Ahmed Hassan Mahmoud	Athletics	Men's 400m T37
Silver	Tarek Hussein	Athletics	Men's discus F37
Silver	Ibrahim Ali	Athletics	Men's discus F57
Silver	Metawa Abou Elkhair	Athletics	Men's discus F58
Silver	El Sayed Moussa	Athletics	Men's javelin F58
Silver	Hany Elbehiry	Athletics	Men's shot put F58
Silver	Osama Elsemegawy	Powerlifting	Men's -52 kg
Silver	Shaban Ibrahim	Powerlifting	Men's -67.5 kg
Silver	Abd Elmonem Farag	Powerlifting	Men's -90 kg
Silver	Sherif Bakr	Powerlifting	Men's -100 kg
Silver	Abir Ibrahim Aly Nail	Powerlifting	Women's -48 kg
Silver	Hend Abd Elaty	Powerlifting	Women's -82.5 kg
Bronze	Ahmed Hassan Mahmoud	Athletics	Men's 200m T37
Bronze	Hossam Abd Ellatif	Athletics	Men's discus F57
Bronze	Ibrahim Ali	Athletics	Men's javelin F57
Bronze	Hany Elbehiry	Athletics	Men's javelin F58
Bronze	Karim Feleifal	Athletics	Women's discus F58
Bronze	Zakia Abdin	Athletics	Women's javelin F58
Bronze	Mervat Omar	Athletics	Women's shot put F58
Bronze	El Sayed Abd El Aal	Powerlifting	Men's -75 kg
Bronze	Mostafa Hamed	Powerlifting	Men's -82.5 kg
Bronze	Nadia Ali	Powerlifting	Women's 67.5 kg

== Athletics ==
Egypt won three gold medals, six silver and seven bronze in athletics. Egyptian athletes competed at the 1999 Disabled Sports USA DS/USA's National Summer Games as part of their preparation efforts for the 2000 Games. Mahmoud Elatar set a world record of 49.92m in men's javelin F58 while Ibrahim Allam set a personal record of 14.77m in shot put, both athletes gained gold medals.

== Powerlifting ==
Egypt won three gold medals, five silver and four bronze, dropping from first place in Atlanta to third in Sydney, behind China and Nigeria.

Metwalli Mathana made his second Paralympic appearance at these Games. Fatma Omar made her Paralympic debut in Sydney, winning her first gold medal in powerlifting at the Games in the -44 kg class. Ahmed Gomaa Mohamed Ahmed participated in his third Games in Sydney. Mohamed Ahmed took up the sport in 1984, and decided to compete internationally because he was able to lift more than his able-bodied counterparts in Egypt. In the period around these Games, he was training five days a week, three hours a day. He was getting funding from the Egyptian Paralympic Committee to allow him to train full-time. In Sydney, he repeated his performance from Atlanta, winning gold and setting a world record in the men's -56 kg class. Osama Elserngawy won silver in the Men's 52 kg event.

== See also ==
- Egypt at the Paralympics
- Egypt at the 2000 Summer Olympics
