= Egypt at the 2004 Summer Paralympics =

- IPC code: EGY
- NPC: Egyptian Paralympic Committee
- Website: paralympic.org.eg

in Athens
- Competitors: 46 in 4 sports
- Medals Ranked 23rd: Gold 6 Silver 9 Bronze 8 Total 23

Summer Paralympics appearances (overview)
- 1972; 1976; 1980; 1984; 1988; 1992; 1996; 2000; 2004; 2008; 2012; 2016; 2020; 2024

Egypt competed at the 2004 Summer Paralympics in Athens, Greece. The team included 46 athletes, 36 men and 10 women. The Egyptian team included 46 sportspeople, 10 women and 36 men. This was 2 fewer women than the country had sent to Sydney for the 2000 Games. Three members of the delegation, including two athletes, participated in a study about dental health during the Games.

== Medallists ==
Medal	Name	Sport	Event
Gold	Ibrahim Allam	Athletics	Men's shot put F58
Gold	Osama El Serngawy	Powerlifting	Men's 52 kg
Gold	Shaban Ibrahim	Powerlifting	Men's 60 kg
Gold	Metwaly Mathna	Powerlifting	Men's 67.5 kg
Gold	Fatma Omar	Powerlifting	Women's 56 kg
Gold	Heba Ahmed	Powerlifting	Women's 67.5 kg
Silver	Mahmoud Elatar	Athletics	Men's discus throw F58
Silver	Ibrahim Ali	Athletics	Men's javelin throw F57
Silver	Mahmoud Elatar	Athletics	Men's javelin throw F58
Silver	Ahmed Ahmed	Powerlifting	Men's 56 kg
Silver	El Sayed Abd Elaal	Powerlifting	Men's 75 kg
Silver	Mostafa Hamed	Powerlifting	Men's 82.5 kg
Silver	Gihan El-Aziz Baioumy	Powerlifting	Women's 44 kg
Silver	Abir Nail	Powerlifting	Women's 52 kg
Silver	Nadia Fekry	Powerlifting	Women's +82.5 kg
Bronze	Hany Elbehiry	Athletics	Men's shot put F58
Bronze	Mostafa Ahmed	Athletics	Men's discus throw F37
Bronze	Mohamed Hassani	Athletics	Men's discus throw F53
Bronze	Hossam Abd Ellattif	Athletics	Men's discus throw F57
Bronze	Aziza Hussein	Athletics	Women's javelin throw F56-58
Bronze	Amany Aly	Powerlifting	Women's 60 kg
Bronze	Hend Abd Elaty	Powerlifting	Women's 82.5 kg
Bronze	Abd Elaal Abd Elaal; Ashraf Abdalla; Abdel Naby Abdel Latif; Mohamed Abou Elyazid; Tamer Awad; Taher El Bahaey; Rezk El Helbawi; Hesham El Shwikh; Mohamed Emara; Salah Hassanein; Yassir Ibrahim; Hossam Massoud	Volleyball	Men's team

== Sports ==
=== Athletics ===
==== Men's field ====
Athlete	Class	Event	Final		
Athlete	Class	Event	Result	Points	Rank
Hossam Abd Ellatif	F57	Discus	43.29	-	3rd place, bronze medalist(s)
Hossam Abd Ellatif	F57	Shot put	11.59	-	6
Mahmoud Abd Elsemea	F56	Discus	34.13	-	5
Metawa Abou Elkhair	F58	Discus	51.06	-	5
Metawa Abou Elkhair	F58	Shot put	12.43	-	8
Mostafa Ahmed	F37	Discus	47.25	-	3rd place, bronze medalist(s)
Mostafa Ahmed	F37	Shot put	11.46	-	5
Ibrahim Ali	F57	Discus	43.04	-	4
Ibrahim Ali	F57	Javelin	39.12	-	2nd place, silver medalist(s)
Ibrahim Allam	F58	Shot put	14.19	-	1st place, gold medalist(s)
Mohamed Beshta	F56	Shot put	10.93	-	6
Mahmoud Elatar	F58	Discus	52.59	-	2nd place, silver medalist(s)
Mahmoud Elatar	F58	Javelin	49.14	-	2nd place, silver medalist(s)
Hany Elbehiry	F58	Shot put	14.09	-	3rd place, bronze medalist(s)
Hussein Elgenedy	F58	Javelin	43.51	-	6
Mohamed Hassani	F53	Discus	23.72	-	3rd place, bronze medalist(s)
El Sayed Moussa	F58	Javelin	45.76	-	4

==== Women's field ====
Athlete	Class	Event	Final		
Athlete	Class	Event	Result	Points	Rank
Shaimaa Abd Ellatif	F56-58	Discus	22.46	949	12
Karima Feleifal	F56-58	Discus	31.62	1019	7
Aziza Hussein	F56-58	Javelin	20.99	1015	3rd place, bronze medalist(s)

=== Powerlifting ===
==== Men ====
Athlete	Event	Result	Rank
Ahmed Ahmed	56kg	180.0	2nd place, silver medalist(s)
El Sayed Abd Elaal	75kg	210.0	2nd place, silver medalist(s)
Mondi Abd Elazim	48kg	NMR	
Osama El Serngawy	52kg	177.5	1st place, gold medalist(s)
Abd Elmonem Farag	90kg	215.0	4
Mostafa Hamed	82.5kg	212.5	2nd place, silver medalist(s)
Mohamed Hamman	100kg	215.0	5
Shaban Ibrahim	60kg	197.5	1st place, gold medalist(s)
Metwaly Mathna	67.5kg	212.5	1st place, gold medalist(s)

==== Women ====
Athlete	Event	Result	Rank
Hend Abd Elaty	82.5kg	122.5	3rd place, bronze medalist(s)
Heba Ahmed	67.5kg	142.5 WR	1st place, gold medalist(s)
Amany Aly	60kg	117.5	3rd place, bronze medalist(s)
Gihan El Aziz Baioumy	44kg	95.0	2nd place, silver medalist(s)
Nadia Fekry	+82.5kg	145.0	2nd place, silver medalist(s)
Abir Nail	52kg	107.5	2nd place, silver medalist(s)
Fatma Omar	56kg	127.5 WR	1st place, gold medalist(s)

=== Table tennis ===
==== Men ====
Athlete	Event	Preliminaries				Quarterfinals	Semifinals	Final / BM	
Athlete	Event	Opposition Result	Opposition Result	Opposition Result	Rank	Opposition Result	Opposition Result	Opposition Result	Rank
Sameh Mohammad Eid	Men's singles 4	Caci (ITA); L 0-3	Sutter (SUI); L 1-3	Benedetti (FRA); L 2-3	4	did not advance			
Farag Faoud Hassan	Men's singles 6	Arnold (GER); W 3-1	Kersten (NED); L 2-3	Politsis (GRE); W 3-2	2 Q	Schmidt (GER); L 1-3	did not advance		
Ali Mohamed Nars	Men's singles 3	Guertler (GER); W 3–0	Verger (FRA); L 2–3	Wolf (AUT); L 1–3	3	did not advance			
Sameh Mohammad Eid; Ali Mohamed Nars	Men's team 4	France (FRA); L 0-3	Germany (GER); L 2-3	Switzerland (SUI); L 1-3	4	did not advance			

=== Volleyball ===
The men's team won a bronze medal after defeating Germany in the bronze medal game.

==== Players ====
- Abd Elaal Abd Elaal
- Ashraf Abdalla
- Abdel Naby Abdel Latif
- Mohamed Abou Elyazid
- Tamer Awad
- Taher El Bahaey
- Rezk El Helbawi
- Hesham El Shwikh
- Mohamed Emara
- Salah Hassanein
- Yassir Ibrahim
- Hossam Massoud

==== Tournament ====
Game	Match	Score	Rank
1	Egypt vs. Bosnia and Herzegovina (BIH)	0 - 3	2 Q
2	Egypt vs. United States (USA)	3 - 0	2 Q
3	Egypt vs. Greece (GRE)	3 - 0	2 Q
Quarterfinals	Egypt vs. Finland (FIN)	3 - 1	W
Semifinals	Egypt vs. Iran (IRI)	0 - 3	W
Bronze medal final	Egypt vs. Germany (GER)	3 - 2	3rd place, bronze medalist(s)

== Media ==
Egyptian broadcasting rights for the 2004 Games were acquired before the start of the Games.

== See also ==
- Egypt at the Paralympics
- Egypt at the 2004 Summer Olympics
