= Egypt at the 2024 Summer Paralympics =

- IPC code: EGY
- NPC: Egyptian Paralympic Committee
- Website: paralympic.org.eg

in Paris, France August 28, 2024 – September 8, 2024
- Competitors: 54 in 10 sports
- Flag bearers: Rehab Ahmed; Ali Elzieny
- Medals Ranked 41st: Gold 2 Silver 2 Bronze 3 Total 7

Summer Paralympics appearances (overview)
- 1972; 1976; 1980; 1984; 1988; 1992; 1996; 2000; 2004; 2008; 2012; 2016; 2020; 2024

Egypt competed at the 2024 Summer Paralympics in Paris, France, from 28 August to 8 September. It is the nation's fourteenth appearance at the Summer Paralympics, since the official debut at the 1972.

== Medalists ==
Medal	Name	Sport	Event	Date
Gold	Mohamed Elmenyawy	Powerlifting	Men's 59 kg	5 September
Gold	Rehab Ahmed	Powerlifting	Women's 55 kg	5 September
Silver	Fatma Elyan	Powerlifting	Women's 67 kg	6 September
Silver	Mohamed Elelfat	Powerlifting	Men's 88 kg	7 September
Bronze	Egypt men's national sitting volleyball team: Ashraf Zaghloul Abdelaziz Abdalla; Zakareia Abdo; Metawa Abouelkhir; Mohamed Abouelyazeid; Abdelnaby Hassan Ahmed Abdellatif; Hesham Elshwikh; Mohamed Hamdy Elsoudany; Ahmed Mohammed Fadl; Ahmed Mohammed Soliman Khamis; Hossam Massoud; Elsayed Moussa; Ahmed Zikry	Sitting volleyball	Men's tournament	6 September
Bronze	Safaa Hassan	Powerlifting	Women's 79 kg	7 September
Bronze	Nadia Ali	Powerlifting	Women's +86 kg	8 September

== Competitors ==
The following is the list of number of competitors in the Games.

Sport	Men	Women	Total
Athletics	2	0	2
Boccia	1	1	2
Goalball	6	0	6
Paracanoeing	0	1	1
Powerlifting	7	6	13
Rowing	1	1	2
Sitting volleyball	12	0	12
Swimming	2	1	3
Table tennis	5	6	11
Taekwondo	1	1	2
Total	37	17	54

== Athletics ==
Egyptian track and field athletes achieved quota places for the following events based on their results at the 2023 World Championships, 2024 World Championships, or through high performance allocation, as long as they meet the minimum entry standard (MES).

Key

- Note–Ranks given for track events are within the athlete's heat only
- Q = Qualified for the next round
- q = Qualified for the next round as a fastest loser or, in field events, by position without achieving the qualifying target
- DQ = Disqualified
- PR = Paralympic Record
- AR = Area (or continental) Record
- NR = National Record
- SB = Season's Best
- N/A = Round not applicable for the event
- Bye = Athlete not required to compete in round

Track & road events

Athlete	Event	Heat		Final	
Athlete	Event	Result	Rank	Result	Rank
Karim Ramadan	Men's 100 m T44	—		11.96	7
Karim Ramadan	Men's 200 m T44	24.48	5	Did not advance	

field events

Athlete	Event	Final	
Athlete	Event	Result	Rank
Abdulrhman Yusuf Shabib Mahmoud	Men's long jump T47	6.25	6

== Boccia ==
For the first time at the Paralympics games, Egypt confirmed two quotas in the boccia competition (one in men and one in women), by virtue of their result as the highest rank nation's in the BC4 pairs event, at the 2023 Africa Regional Championship in Cairo.

Athlete	Event	Pool matches				Quarterfinals	Semifinals	Final / BM	
Athlete	Event	Opposition Score	Opposition Score	Opposition Score	Rank	Opposition Score	Opposition Score	Opposition Score	Rank
Mahmoud Allam	Men's individual BC4	Larpyen (THA); L 0–11	Grisales (COL); L 5–9	Nicolai (GER); L 2–6	4	Did not advance			14
Hanaa Elfar	Women's individual BC4	Levine (CAN); L 3–4	Konenko (UKR); W 8–1	Mat Salim (MAL); L 3–11	3	Did not advance			12
Mahmoud Allam; Hanaa Elfar	Mixed pairs BC4	Hong Kong; L 1–8	Brazil; W 2*–2	—	2 Q	Thailand; L 0–11	Did not advance		8

== Goalball ==
Summary

Team	Event	Group Stage				Quarterfinal	Semifinal	Final / BM	
Team	Event	Opposition Score	Opposition Score	Opposition Score	Rank	Opposition Score	Opposition Score	Opposition Score	Rank
Egypt men's	Men's tournament	Ukraine; L 3–6	China; L 4–7	Japan; L 1–11	4 Q	Brazil; L 0–10	—	France; L 4–6	8

=== Men's tournament ===
The Egyptian men's goalball team qualified for the paralympic games by virtue of the results at the 2023 IBSA African Championships in Cairo, Egypt.

Team roster

Coach: Mohamed Farahat

The following is the Egypt squad in the goalball tournament of the 2024 Summer Paralympics.

No.	Player	Class	Date of birth (age)
3	Ahmed Abdelrazek	B2	28 January 2003 (aged 21)
4	Moaaz Yousef	B3	16 January 2002 (aged 22)
5	Sayed Awwad	B3	1 March 2002 (aged 22)
7	Omar Mohamed	B3	2 August 1997 (aged 27)
8	Mohamed Ismaeil	B1	13 August 2007 (aged 17)
9	Ahmed Elsayed	B2	17 January 2002 (aged 22)

Group stage

Pos	Team	Pld	W	D	L	GF	GA	GD	Pts	Qualification
1	China	3	3	0	0	20	11	+9	9	Quarter-finals
2	Ukraine	3	2	0	1	16	17	−1	6	Quarter-finals
3	Japan	3	1	0	2	25	17	+8	3	Quarter-finals
4	Egypt	3	0	0	3	8	24	−16	0	Quarter-finals

Source: Paris 2024
29 August 2024
13:15

Ukraine	6−3	Egypt
Oliinyk 0', 8', 12', 16'; Zhyhalin 5'; Strelchyk 22'	Report	Mohamed 11', 18'; Awwad 14'

South Paris Arena, Paris
Referee:
Sarah Kuper (Germany)
Kazuto Ono (Japan)

31 August 2024
09:00

Egypt	4–7	China
Awwad 5'; Elsayed 12'; Mohamed 18'; Yousef 22'	Report	Yu Deyi 1', 6', 10'; Yang 5', 8', 15', 16'

South Paris Arena, Paris
Referee:
Linda Welborn (United States)
Romualdas Vaitieku (Lithuania)

1 September 2024
09:00

Egypt	1–11	Japan
Mohamed 6'	Report	Sano 6', 6'; Kaneko 7', 8', 8', 10'; Miyajiki 12', 13', 13', 14'; Torii 13'

South Paris Arena, Paris
Referee:
Juha Vuokila (Finland)
Manar Obeidat (Jordan)

Quarter-finals

2 September 2024
13:15

Brazil	10–0	Egypt
Moreno 4', 6'; Ernesto 9', 15'; Sousa 10', 12', 14'; Dantas 11', 17'; Saturnino 17'	Report

South Paris Arena, Paris
Referee:
Antonios Christodoulos (Greece)
Sarah Kuper (Germany)

Seventh medal match

3 September 2024
09:00

France	6–4	Egypt
Boualia 0', 1'; Baich 3', 18'; Daudin 9'; Ouni 10'	Report	Mohamed 0', 18'; Awwad 3', 6'

South Paris Arena, Paris
Referee:
Kazuto Ono (Japan)
Janice Dawson (Canada)

== Paracanoeing ==
Egypt earned quota places for the following events through the 2024 ICF Canoe Sprint World Championships in Szeged, Hungary.

Athlete	Event	Heats		Semifinal		Final	
Athlete	Event	Time	Rank	Time	Rank	Time	Rank
Salwa Ahmed	Women's KL2	1:07.90	6 SF	1:07.12	5 FB	1:02.32	9

== Powerlifting ==
Athlete	Event	Attempts (kg)				Result (kg)	Rank
Athlete	Event	1	2	3	4	Result (kg)	Rank
Taha Abdelmajid	Men's 54 kg	165	167	171	—	171	6
Mohamed Elmenyawy	Men's 59 kg	194	198	201	—	201	1st place, gold medalist(s)
Sherif Osman	Men's 65 kg	193	198	~~200~~	—	198	7
Mahmoud Attia	Men's 72 kg	188	193	195	—	195	6
Mohamed Elelfat	Men's 88 kg	220	224	~~230~~	—	224	2nd place, silver medalist(s)
Hany Abdelhady	Men's 97 kg	205	212	~~220~~	—	212	6
Amr Mosaad	Men's + 107 kg	227	~~235^{LC}~~	~~237~~	—	227	6
Enas Elgebaly Abdelaal Aggag	Women's 41 kg	93	~~99~~	~~99~~	—	93	7
Rehab Ahmed	Women's 55 kg	117	121	~~122~~	—	121	1st place, gold medalist(s)
Fatma Elyan	Women's 67 kg	130	134	139	—	139	2nd place, silver medalist(s)
Safaa Hassan	Women's 79 kg	134	139	~~146~~	—	139	3rd place, bronze medalist(s)
Randa Mahmoud	Women's 86 kg	128	133	~~140~~	—	133	4
Nadia Ali	Women's + 86 kg	141	145	~~154~~	—	145	3rd place, bronze medalist(s)

== Rowing ==
Egypt qualified one boats in mixed double sculls classes, by winning the 2023 African Continental Qualification Regatta in Tunis, Tunisia.

Athlete	Event	Heats		Repechage		Final	
Athlete	Event	Time	Rank	Time	Rank	Time	Rank
Ali Elzieny; Marwa Abdelaal	PR3 mixed double sculls	8:41.23	5 R	8:40.09	4 FB	8:47.99	10

Qualification Legend: FA=Final A (medal); FB=Final B (non-medal); R=Repechage

== Sitting volleyball ==
Egypt men's national team entered the paralympic games by virtue, following the triumph of their gold medal results, at the 2024 African Sitting Volleyball Championships in Lagos, Nigeria.

Team Roster

- Ashraf Zaghloul Abdelaziz Abdalla
- Zakareia Abdo
- Metawa Abouelkhir
- Mohamed Abouelyazeid
- Abdelnaby Hassan Ahmed Abdellatif
- Hesham Elshwikh
- Mohamed Hamdy Elsoudany
- Ahmed Mohammed Fadl
- Ahmed Mohammed Soliman Khamis
- Hossam Massoud
- Elsayed Moussa Saad Moussa
- Ahmed Zikry

Summary

Team	Event	Group Stage				Semifinal	Final / BM	
Team	Event	Opposition Score	Opposition Score	Opposition Score	Rank	Opposition Score	Opposition Score	Rank
Egypt men's	Men's tournament	Bosnia and Herzegovina; L 1-3	France; W 3-0	Kazakhstan; W 3-1	2 Q	Iran; L 1-3	Germany; W 3-2	3rd place, bronze medalist(s)

== Swimming ==
Egypt qualified three swimmers (two men and one woman) to compete at the games, by achieving the Minimum Qualification Standard (MQS) allocation slots.

Men

Athlete	Events	Heats		Final	
Athlete	Events	Time	Rank	Time	Rank
Zeiad Tarek Hasby	50 m freestyle S10	24.75	7 Q	24.89	8
Zeyad Kahil	200 m freestyle S5	2:52.12	8 Q	2:52.64	8
Zeyad Kahil	100 m breaststroke SB4	1:53.50	7 Q	1:53.21	7

Women

Athlete	Events	Heats		Final	
Athlete	Events	Time	Rank	Time	Rank
Malak Abdelshafi	100 m breaststroke SB4	2:19.51	10	Did not advance	
Malak Abdelshafi	200 m individual medley SM5	DSQ		Did not advance	

== Table tennis ==
Egypt entered eleven para table tennis players for the Paralympic games. Five of them (Khaled, Sayed, Ola, Fawzia & Hagar) qualified for their games by virtue of winning the gold medal, in their respective class, through the 2023 African Para Championships held in Giza. Later on, six para table tennis players qualified for the games through the allocations of ITTF final ranking.

Men

Athlete	Event	Round of 32	Round of 16	Quarterfinals	Semifinals	Final / BM	
Athlete	Event	Opposition Result	Opposition Result	Opposition Result	Opposition Result	Opposition Result	Rank
Eslam Raslan	Individual C1	—	Fernández (CUB); L 0–3	Did not advance			
Ahmed Elmahsy	Individual C2	—	Lovas (SVK); L 2–3	Did not advance			
Khaled Ramadan	Individual C3	Nalepka (POL); L 1–3	Did not advance				
Sayed Youssef	Individual C7	—	Stroh (BRA); W 3-0	Yan (CHN); L 0-3	Did not advance		
Abdelrahman Abdalla	Individual C11	—	Gomes (BRA); L 0-3	Did not advance			
Khaled Ramadan; Eslam Raslan	Men's double MD4	—	Rafal Czuper / Jakimczuk (POL); L 0–3	Did not advance			

Women

Athlete	Event	Round of 32	Round of 16	Quarterfinals	Semifinals	Final / BM	
Athlete	Event	Opposition Result	Opposition Result	Opposition Result	Opposition Result	Opposition Result	Rank
Ola Soliman	Individual C1-2	—	Spegel (GER); L 0–3	Did not advance			
Fawzia Elshamy	Individual C3	—	Lee (KOR); L 0–3	Did not advance			
Mona Abdelhak	Individual C4	—	Gu (CHN); L 1-3	Did not advance			
Hanaa Hammad	Individual C6	—	Caillaud (FRA); L 0-3	Did not advance			
Samah Abdelaziz	Individual C7	—	Kim (KOR); L 0–3	Did not advance			
Hagar Elsayed	Individual C8	—	Arloy (HUN); L 0–3	Did not advance			
Fawzia Elshamy; Ola Soliman	Women's double WD5	—		Oliveira / Oliveira (BRA); L 0–3	Did not advance		
Hagar Elsayed; Hanaa Hammad	Women's double WD14	—		Husic Dahl / Tveiten (NOR); L 0–3	Did not advance		

Mixed

Athlete	Event	Round of 32	Round of 16	Quarterfinals	Semifinals	Final / BM	
Athlete	Event	Opposition Result	Opposition Result	Opposition Result	Opposition Result	Opposition Result	Rank
Khaled Ramadan; Fawzia Elshamy	Mixed double XD7	Travnicek / Kanova (SVK); L 0–3	Did not advance				
Sayed Youssef; Hanaa Hammad	Mixed double XD17	Boheas / Caillaud (FRA); L 0–3	Did not advance				

== Taekwondo ==
Egypt entered two athletes to compete at the Paralympics competition. Salma Moneem Hassan qualified for Paris 2024, by virtue of finishing within the top six in the Paralympic rankings in women's 52 kg class; and Abdel Rahman Mahmoud join the Egyptian roster, following the triumph of his gold medal results, at the 2024 African Qualification Tournament in Dakar, Senegal.

Athlete	Event	First round	Quarterfinals	Semifinals	Repechage 1	Final / BM	
Athlete	Event	Opposition Result	Opposition Result	Opposition Result	Opposition Result	Opposition Result	Rank
Abdel Rahman Mahmoud	Men's –70 kg	Nikoladze (GEO); L 16-18	Did not advance				
Salma Moneem Hassan	Women's –52 kg	Obonyo (KEN); W 12–3	Ulambayar (MGL); L 5-7	—	Krassavtseva (KAZ); W 8-1	Japaridze (GEO); L 4-4sup	5

== See also ==
- Egypt at the 2024 Summer Olympics
- Egypt at the Paralympics
