= Egypt at the 2012 Summer Paralympics =

- IPC code: EGY
- NPC: Egyptian Paralympic Committee
- Website: paralympic.org.eg

in London
- Competitors: 40 in 4 sports
- Medals Ranked 23rd: Gold 4 Silver 4 Bronze 7 Total 15

Summer Paralympics appearances (overview)
- 1972; 1976; 1980; 1984; 1988; 1992; 1996; 2000; 2004; 2008; 2012; 2016; 2020; 2024

Egypt competed at the 2012 Summer Paralympics in London, United Kingdom from August 29 to September 9, 2012. Egypt made their debut at the Paralympic Games in 1972. Since their debut Egypt have won 165 medals (46 gold, 59 silver, 60 bronze). Egypt's most successful appearance at the Paralympic Games was in Atlanta in 1980, winning 30 medals.

== Background ==
55 of the Egyptian 2012 Summer Paralympic team, including volleyball and table tennis athletes, trained in venues across Lincolnshire, including Boston, Louth and the city of Lincoln.

Karem Elngar was quoted by the BBC as saying of the 2012 Paralympics, "In Egypt there is a negative attitude to disabled people. The Olympics has not helped to discredit this perception."

The delegation stayed at Egremont House and Festive Mansions in the Paralympic Village.

== Medals ==
Egypt left London with 15 medals, 4 gold, 4 silver and 7 bronze. This was an improvement of 3 more bronze medals than they won in Beijing.

== Athletics ==
Men's track

Athlete	Events	Heat		Final	
Athlete	Events	Time	Rank	Time	Rank
Mostafa Fathalla Mohamed	100m T12	DNS		did not advance	
Mostafa Fathalla Mohamed	200m T12	24.58	4	did not advance	

Men's field

Athlete	Events	Mark	Points	Rank
Ibrahim Ahmed Abdelwareth	Shot put F37-38	15.53	-	2nd place, silver medalist(s)
Ibrahim Ahmed Abdelwareth	Discus throw F37-38	42.94	950	8
Metawa Abouelkhir	Discus throw F57-58	54.19	944	3rd place, bronze medalist(s)
Ibrahim Ibrahim	Discus throw F54-56	35.32	834	9
Ibrahim Ibrahim	Javelin throw F54-56	34.31	-	6
Mohamed Mohamed Ramadan	Discus throw F37-38	51.92	996	5
Raed Salem	Javelin throw F57-58	47.90	991	3rd place, bronze medalist(s)

== Powerlifting ==
Sherif Othman won gold in powerlifting for Egypt, repeating his winning performance at the 2008 Games. Fatma Omar competed at and became a four-time Paralympic gold medalist in London. Metwalli Mathana appeared in his fifth Paralympic Games. Egypt finished the London Games with 2 gold, 3 silver and 2 bronze medals. Following the London Games, Egypt's all time medal total in the sport was 59, including 19 golds.

Historically, Egyptian powerlifters have faced a number of barriers despite their obvious success at the Paralympic Games. They have lacked financial support. Because of the low numbers of practitioners, there is a lack of awareness among parents of children with disabilities about the potential to get involved with powerlifting. These low numbers of practitioners also make the sport cost more, which further reduces participation numbers. The materials provided by the Egyptian Paralympic Committee, and for Disabled Sport Powerlifting Federation are also sometimes wanting in quality, and the cost of distributing them means they are sometimes hard to come by. It is also hard for Egyptians to go abroad, and to bring foreign lifers to Egypt to assist Egyptians in training.

Men

Athlete	Event	Result	Rank
Hany Abdelhady	-90kg	241.0	1st place, gold medalist(s)
Taha Abdelmagid	-48kg	165.0	3rd place, bronze medalist(s)
Mohamed Eldib	-100kg	249.0	1st place, gold medalist(s)
Mohamed Elelfat	-75kg	219.0	2nd place, silver medalist(s)
Shaaban Ibrahim	-67.5kg	202.0	3rd place, bronze medalist(s)
Metwaly Mathana	-82.5kg	227.0	3rd place, bronze medalist(s)
Sherif Othman	-56kg	197.0	1st place, gold medalist(s)
Mohamed Sabet	+100kg	225.0	6

Women

Athlete	Event	Result	Rank
Gihan Abdelaziz	-52kg	107.0	4
Heba Ahmed	+82.5kg	140.0	2nd place, silver medalist(s)
Amany Ali	-75kg	122.0	4
Amal Mahmoud	-60kg	118.0	3rd place, bronze medalist(s)
Randa Mahmoud	-82.5kg	140.0	2nd place, silver medalist(s)
Fatma Omar	-56kg	142.0 WR	1st place, gold medalist(s)
Zeinab Oteify	-44kg	95.0	4

== Sitting volleyball ==
=== Men's tournament ===
Roster

The following is the Egypt roster in the men's volleyball tournament of the 2012 Summer Paralympics.

Head coach: Mansour El Mohamdy

№	Name	Date of birth	Position	2012 club
1	Hesham Abdelmaksod	2 February 1975	M	(Egypt) El Houreya
2	Tamer Morgan Khalil	9 March 1971	WS	(Egypt) El Houreya
3	Yasser Saad Abd El Wahab Hassan	14 October 1973	SE	(Egypt) Police Sports Club Association
4	Ashraf Zaghloul Abdel Aziz	24 February 1974	WS	(Egypt) Police Sports Club Association
5	Taher Adel Elbahaey	9 June 1972	SE	(Egypt) El Houreya
6	Ahmed Mohammed Soliman Khamis	12 April 1987	M	(Egypt) Club Alexandria Petroleum
7	Ahmed Mohammed Fadl	1 March 1985	WS	(Egypt) Club Alexandria Petroleum
8	Mohamed Ezzeldin Mohamed	1 September 1992	WS	(Egypt) Club Alexandria Petroleum
9	Elsayed Moussa Saad	28 May 1979	WS	(Egypt) Police Sports Club Association
10	Abdel Nabi Ahmed Abdel Latif	18 June 1972	L	(Egypt) Police Sports Club Association
12	Mohamed Ibrahim	29 March 1979	M	(Egypt) Police Sports Club Association

Group play

Pos	Team	Pld	W	L	Pts	SW	SL	SR	SPW	SPL	SPR
1	Germany	4	4	0	8	12	3	4.000	340	266	1.278
2	Russia	4	3	1	7	11	5	2.200	356	275	1.295
3	Egypt	4	2	2	6	9	6	1.500	424	402	1.055
4	Great Britain	4	1	3	5	3	9	0.333	230	276	0.833
5	Morocco	4	0	4	4	0	12	0.000	157	300	0.523

30 August 2012; 19:00	Egypt	3–0	Morocco	ExCeL London, London; Referees: Xin Xia (CHN), Masoud Yazdanpanah (IRI)
30 August 2012; 19:00	(25–10, 25–12, 25–22); Report			ExCeL London, London; Referees: Xin Xia (CHN), Masoud Yazdanpanah (IRI)

31 August 2012; 21:00	Great Britain	0–3	Egypt	ExCeL London, London; Referees: Joe Campbell (GBR), Dariusz Jasinski (POL)
31 August 2012; 21:00	(15–25, 17–25, 22–25); Report			ExCeL London, London; Referees: Joe Campbell (GBR), Dariusz Jasinski (POL)

2 September 2012; 21:00	Egypt	2–3	Russia	ExCeL London, London; Referees: Dominik Raca (CRO), Ronaldo Chaves (BRA)
2 September 2012; 21:00	(25–22, 25–19, 18–25, 21–25, 11–15); Report			ExCeL London, London; Referees: Dominik Raca (CRO), Ronaldo Chaves (BRA)

4 September 2012; 9:00	Egypt	1–3	Germany	ExCeL London, London; Referees: Toomas Murulo (EST), Dominik Raca (CRO)
4 September 2012; 9:00	(16–25, 22–25, 25–23, 24–26); Report			ExCeL London, London; Referees: Toomas Murulo (EST), Dominik Raca (CRO)

Quarter-final

5 September 2012; 14:00	Egypt	0–3	Bosnia and Herzegovina	ExCeL London, London; Referees: Joe Campbell (USA), Amin Al-Traifi (KSA)
5 September 2012; 14:00	(17–25, 16–25, 22–25); Report			ExCeL London, London; Referees: Joe Campbell (USA), Amin Al-Traifi (KSA)

5th–8th place semi-final

6 September 2012; 14:00	China	2–3	Egypt	ExCeL London, London; Referees: Dominik Raca (CRO), Sari Mannersuo (FIN)
6 September 2012; 14:00	(25–16, 23–25, 23–25, 25–17, 11–15); Report			ExCeL London, London; Referees: Dominik Raca (CRO), Sari Mannersuo (FIN)

5th–6th place match

8 September 2012; 14:00	Egypt	2–3	Brazil	ExCeL London, London; Referees: Masoud Yazdanpanah (IRI), Benno Meijer (NED)
8 September 2012; 14:00	(14–25, 25–15, 21–25, 25–15, 13–15); Report			ExCeL London, London; Referees: Masoud Yazdanpanah (IRI), Benno Meijer (NED)

== Table tennis ==
Men's singles

Athlete	Event	Preliminaries			Quarterfinals	Semifinals	Finals	
Athlete	Event	Opposition Result	Opposition Result	Rank	Opposition Result	Opposition Result	Opposition Result	Rank
Abdelrahman Abdelwahab	Singles class 10	Andersson (SWE); W 3–2	Berecki (HUN); L 0–3	3	did not advance			
Ehab Fetir	Singles class 5	Jung (KOR); L 1–3	Lin (TPE); L 2–3	3	—N/a	did not advance		
Sameh Saleh	Singles class 4	Gomez (VEN); W 3–1	Mihalik (SVK); W 3–2	1	Guo (CHN); W 3–0	Kim (KOR); L 1–3	Thomas (FRA); W 3–1	3rd place, bronze medalist(s)
Sayed Youssef	Singles class 7	Lambert (CZE); W 3–1	Wollmert (CZE); L 0–3	2	did not advance			

Women's singles

Athlete	Event	Preliminaries			Semifinals	Finals	
Athlete	Event	Opposition Result	Opposition Result	Rank	Opposition Result	Opposition Result	Rank
Fadia Ahmed	Singles class 4	Moon (KOR); L 0–3	Gilroy (GBR); L 0–3	3	did not advance		
Angham Maghraby	Singles class 10	Yang (CHN); L 0–3	Partyka (POL); L 0–3	3	did not advance		
Eman Mahmoud	Singles class 8	Yu (CHN); L 0–3	Abrahamsson (SWE); L 1–3	3	did not advance		
Faiza Mahmoud	Singles class 7	Ovsyannikova (RUS); L 1–3	Schrijver (NED); L 1–3	3	did not advance		

Teams

Athlete	Event	Round of 16	Quarterfinals	Semifinals	Finals	
Athlete	Event	Opposition Result	Opposition Result	Opposition Result	Opposition Result	Rank
Abdelrahman Abdelwahab; Sayed Youssef	Men's team class 9-10	Netherlands (NED); L 2–3	did not advance			
Ehab Fetir; Sameh Saleh	Men's team class 4-5	Bye	Chinese Taipei (TPE); L 1–3	did not advance		
Angham Maghraby; Faiza Mahmoud	Women's team class 6-10	Ukraine (UKR); L 1–3	did not advance			
