= Egypt at the 2016 Summer Paralympics =

- IPC code: EGY
- NPC: Egyptian Paralympic Committee
- Website: paralympic.org.eg

in Rio de Janeiro
- Competitors: 44 in 7 sports
- Flag bearer: Hayat Khattab
- Medals Ranked 30th: Gold 3 Silver 5 Bronze 4 Total 12

Summer Paralympics appearances (overview)
- 1972; 1976; 1980; 1984; 1988; 1992; 1996; 2000; 2004; 2008; 2012; 2016; 2020; 2024

Egypt competed at the 2016 Summer Paralympics in Rio de Janeiro, Brazil, from 7 to 18 September 2016. The country sent a delegation of 44 sportspeople. The team included 16-year-old Ayattalah Ayman, the youngest member of the delegation and the first woman to represent Egypt in swimming. It also included 41-year-old Ibrahim Al Husseini Hamadtou, the only table tennis player to compete while holding the paddle in his mouth.

Egypt finished the 2016 Games ranked second all time for total medals won by African countries. with 143 total medals, 45 gold, 43 silver and 55 bronze. For the 2016 Games, Egypt ranked fifth in total gold medals among African nations, claiming 3 golds. All but two of the medals won by Egyptians were in powerlifting.

Egypt competed in several sports including athletics, powerlifting, sitting volleyball, swimming and tennis.

== Team ==
Egypt's team included 44 athletes, captained by Hayat Khattab. Ayattalah Ayman was the youngest member of the Egyptian delegation, competing at the Games as a 16 year old.

== Background ==
Ahead of the Games, Khattab said at a press conference, “Our athletes are ready for the challenge, and the sponsorship that was provided to the champions will be repaid as they will gain a number of gold medals and raise the Egyptian flag." She also talked about challenges for qualification after changes were made to medal events following the 2012 Games, saying these changes, “made it difficult for a number of our athletes to make it to the Games. As an example, Mottawai Abdel-Baki, who has long experience in athletics, had to switch to sitting volleyball after his category in athletics was cancelled so we lost hope for a medal.”

Egypt's Minister of Youth and Sports Khaled Abdel-Aziz told his country's Paralympians ahead of the Games, “We are trying our best to give you an equal chance and I am sure you will collect more medals and that is why the ministry is delaying the celebration of the Olympians until you are back with the medals."

== Medalists ==
Egypt finished the 2016 Games ranked second all time for total medals won by African countries, with 143 total medals, 45 gold, 43 silver and 55 bronze. They were ahead of third ranked Tunisia who had 74 all time, of which 32 were gold, 28 silver and 14 bronze. They were behind top ranked South Africa who have 280 total medals, 110 gold, 88 silver and 82 bronze.

For the 2016 Games, Egypt ranked fifth in total gold medals among African nations, claiming 3 golds. They were behind Nigeria, South Africa, Tunisia and Algeria. Egypt finished with 12 medals overall, including 5 silver and 4 bronze.

The following Egyptian athletes won medals at the Games. In the by discipline sections below, medalists' names are bolded.

Medal	Name	Sport	Event	Date
Gold	Sherif Othman	Powerlifting	Men's −59 kg	September 9
Gold	Randa Mahmoud	Powerlifting	Women's −86 kg	September 13
Gold	Mohamed Eldib	Powerlifting	Men's −97 kg	September 13
Silver	Rehab Ahmed	Powerlifting	Women's −50 kg	September 10
Silver	Fatma Omar	Powerlifting	Women's −61 kg	September 11
Silver	Mostafa Fathalla Mohamed	Athletics	Men's 100 metres −T37	September 11
Silver	Mohamed Ahmed	Powerlifting	Men's −107 kg	September 14
Silver	Amr Mosaad	Powerlifting	Men's +107 kg	September 14
Bronze	Shaaban Ibrahim	Powerlifting	Men's −65 kg	September 10
Bronze	Amal Mahmoud	Powerlifting	Women's −67 kg	September 11
Bronze	Amany Ali	Powerlifting	Women's −73 kg	September 12
Bronze	Egypt men's national sitting volleyball team: Hesham Elshwikh; Shaaban Khater; Ashraf Abdalla; Mohamed Zeid; Ahmed Soliman; Ahmed Amer; Hossam Massoud; Elsayed Moussa; Abdelnaby Abdellatif; Sabry Eid; Mohamed Abouelyazeid; Metawa Abouelkhir	Sitting volleyball	Men's tournament	September 18

Medals by sport
**Sport**	1st place, gold medalist(s)	2nd place, silver medalist(s)	3rd place, bronze medalist(s)	**Total**
Powerlifting	3	4	3	10
Athletics	0	1	0	1
Sitting volleyball	0	0	1	1
Total	3	5	4	12

== Disability classifications ==
Every participant at the Paralympics has their disability grouped into one of five disability categories; amputation, the condition may be congenital or sustained through injury or illness; cerebral palsy; wheelchair athletes, there is often overlap between this and other categories; visual impairment, including blindness; Les autres, any physical disability that does not fall strictly under one of the other categories, for example dwarfism or multiple sclerosis. Each Paralympic sport then has its own classifications, dependent upon the specific physical demands of competition. Events are given a code, made of numbers and letters, describing the type of event and classification of the athletes competing. Some sports, such as athletics, divide athletes by both the category and severity of their disabilities, other sports, for example swimming, group competitors from different categories together, the only separation being based on the severity of the disability.

== Athletics ==
Six Egyptians competed in track and field at the 2016 Games.

== Powerlifting ==
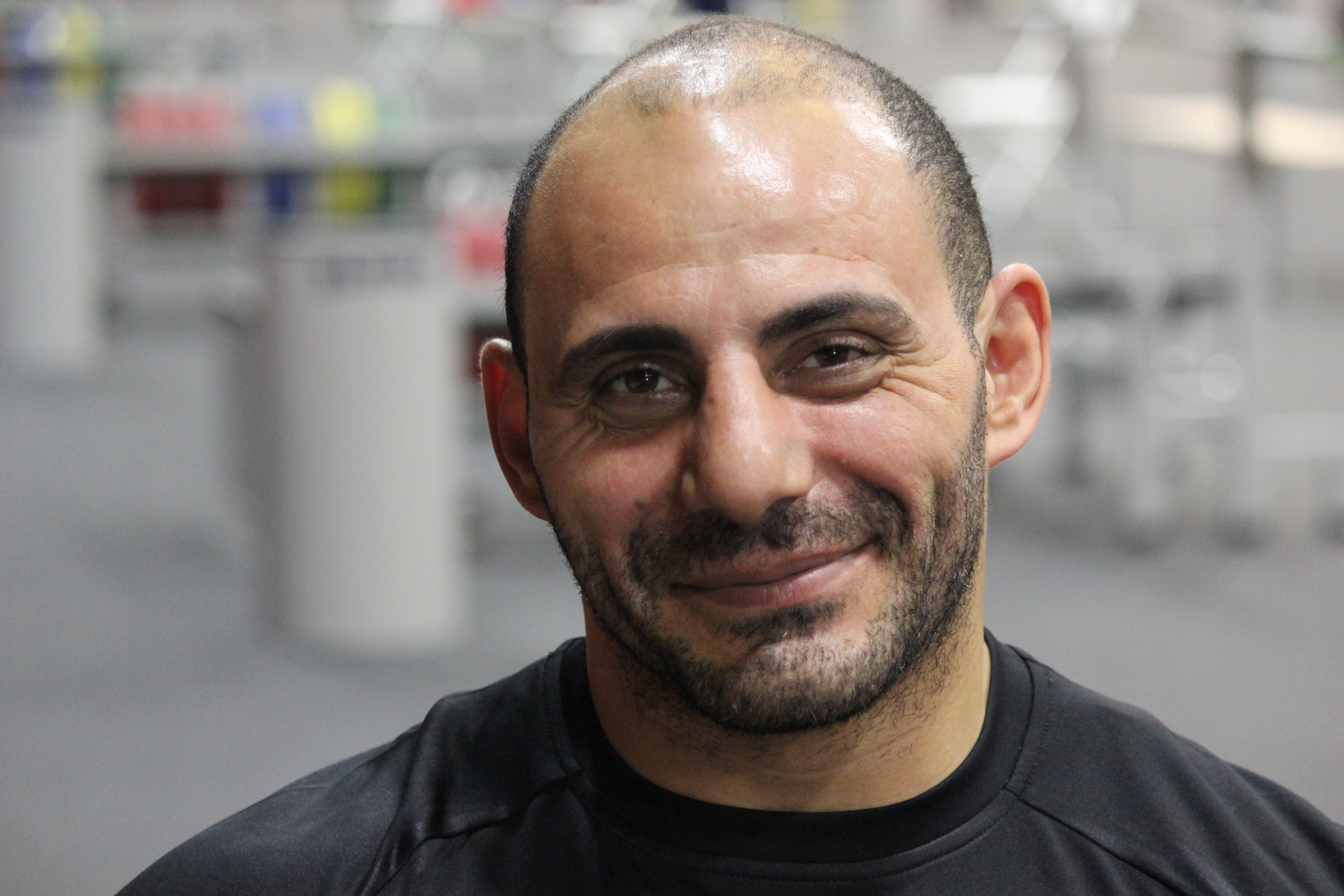
Egyptian powerlifter Mohamed Elelfat in Rio

Egypt secured 17 quotas for Rio 2016. They were led to Rio by four time Paralympic gold medalist Fatma Omar. The team also included Sherif Othman and Metwalli Mathana. Metwalli Mathana appeared in his sixth Paralympic Games.

Historically, Egyptian powerlifters have faced a number of barriers despite their obvious success at the Paralympic Games. They have lacked financial support. Because of the low numbers of practitioners, there is a lack of awareness among parents of children with disabilities about the potential to get involved with powerlifting. These low numbers of practitioners also make the sport cost more, which further reduces participation numbers. The materials provided by the Egyptian Paralympic Committee, and for Disabled Sport Powerlifting Federation are also sometimes wanting in quality, and the cost of distributing them means they are sometimes hard to come by. It is also hard for Egyptians to go abroad, and to bring foreign lifers to Egypt to assist Egyptians in training.

Athlete	Event	Total lifted	Rank
Women's
Nawal Ramadan	Women's −41 kg	NMR	-
Zeinab Oteify	Women's −45 kg	90 kg	5th
Rehab Ahmed	Women's −50 kg	104 kg	2nd place, silver medalist(s)
Fatma Omar	Women's −61 kg	140 kg	2nd place, silver medalist(s)
Amal Mahmoud	Women's −67 kg	108 kg	3rd place, bronze medalist(s)
Amany Ali	Women's −73 kg	127 kg	3rd place, bronze medalist(s)
Gehan Hassan	Women's −79 kg	115 kg	6th
Randa Mahmoud	Women's −86 kg	130 kg	1st place, gold medalist(s)
Nadia Ali	Women's +86 kg	NMR	-
Men's
Sherif Othman	Men's −59 kg	203 kg	1st place, gold medalist(s)
Shaaban Ibrahim	Men's −65 kg	193 kg	3rd place, bronze medalist(s)
Mohamed Elelfat	Men's −72 kg	NMR	-
Metwaly Mathna	Men's −80 kg	NMR	-
Hany Abdelhady	Men's −88 kg	200 kg	6th
Mohamed Eldib	Men's −97 kg	237 kg	1st place, gold medalist(s)
Mohamed Ahmed	Men's −107 kg	233 kg	2nd place, silver medalist(s)
Amr Mosaad	Men's +107 kg	235 kg	2nd place, silver medalist(s)

== Sitting volleyball ==
Egypt men's national sitting volleyball team qualified for the 2016 Games at the African Championships.

=== Men ===
Pos	Team	Pld	W	L	Pts	SW	SL	SR	SPW	SPL	SPR	Qualification
1	Egypt	3	3	0	6	9	4	2.250	267	234	1.141	Semi-finals
2	Brazil (H)	3	2	1	5	8	4	2.000	278	212	1.311	Semi-finals
3	Germany	3	1	2	4	6	8	0.750	280	288	0.972	Classification 5th / 6th
4	United States	3	0	3	3	2	9	0.222	167	258	0.647	Classification 7th / 8th

Source: Paralympic.org
(H) Host

9 September 2016; 14:00	Egypt	3–2	Germany	Riocentro - Pavilion 6, Rio de Janeiro
9 September 2016; 14:00	(18–25, 21–25, 25–22, 25–14, 15–7); Report			Riocentro - Pavilion 6, Rio de Janeiro

11 September 2016; 10:00	Brazil	2–3	Egypt	Riocentro - Pavilion 6, Rio de Janeiro
11 September 2016; 10:00	(18–25, 25–13, 23–25, 25–10, 13–15); Report			Riocentro - Pavilion 6, Rio de Janeiro

13 September 2016; 14:00	Egypt	3–0	United States	Riocentro - Pavilion 6, Rio de Janeiro
13 September 2016; 14:00	(25–14, 25–9, 25–14); Report			Riocentro - Pavilion 6, Rio de Janeiro

Semi-final

16 September 2016; 18:30	Egypt	0–3	Bosnia and Herzegovina	Riocentro - Pavilion 6, Rio de Janeiro
16 September 2016; 18:30	(23–25, 16–25, 20–25); Report			Riocentro - Pavilion 6, Rio de Janeiro

Bronze medal game

18 September 2016; 09:30	Egypt	3–2	Brazil	Riocentro - Pavilion 6, Rio de Janeiro
18 September 2016; 09:30	(28–26, 29–31, 19–25, 25–22, 15–13); Report			Riocentro - Pavilion 6, Rio de Janeiro

== Swimming ==
Ayattalah Ayman was Egypt's first female swimmer to compete at the Paralympic Games.

== Table tennis ==
Egypt sent a five player strong delegation to Rio. The team included Ibrahim Al Husseini Hamadtou, the only table tennis player to compete while holding the paddle in his mouth. He went to the Rio Games when he was a 41-year-old. ElSaied Ragab was selected as an umpire for the Paralympic Games in table tennis.

== See also ==
- Egypt at the 2016 Summer Olympics
