= Powerlifting at the 2020 Summer Paralympics – Men's 97 kg =

Powerlifting – Men's 97 kg at the XVI Paralympic Games
- Venue: Tokyo International Forum
- Date: 29 August 2021
- Competitors: 8 from 8 nations

Medalists
1st place, gold medalist(s)		Yan Panpan	China
2nd place, silver medalist(s)		Seyedhamed Solhipouravanji	Iran
3rd place, bronze medalist(s)		Fabio Torres	Colombia

The men's 97 kg powerlifting event at the 2020 Summer Paralympics was contested on 29 August at Tokyo International Forum.

== Records ==
There are twenty powerlifting events, corresponding to ten weight classes each for men and women. Prior to this competition, the existing world and Paralympic records were as follows.

World Record	Mohamed Eldib (EGY)	243 kg	Dubai, United Arab Emirates	18 February 2016
Paralympic Record	Mohamed Eldib (EGY)	237 kg	Rio de Janeiro, Brazil	13 September 2016

== Results ==
Rank	Name	Body weight (kg)	Attempts (kg)				Result (kg)
Rank	Name	Body weight (kg)	1	2	3	4	Result (kg)
1st place, gold medalist(s)	Yan Panpan (CHN)	92.65	223	227	~~243.5~~	–	227
2nd place, silver medalist(s)	Seyedhamed Solhipouravanji (IRI)	95.09	~~221~~	~~222~~	222	–	222
3rd place, bronze medalist(s)	Fabio Torres (COL)	94.34	221	~~226~~	~~226~~	–	221
4	Mutaz Zakaria Daoud Aljuneidi (JOR)	96.07	215	~~222~~	~~223~~	–	215
5	Petar Milenkovic (SRB)	94.46	203	~~216~~	~~216~~	–	203
6	Mohamed Ahmed (EGY)	94.53	~~200~~	~~200~~	200	–	200
7	Nurlan Babajanov (AZE)	95.81	185	~~195~~	~~204~~	–	185
8	Denis Raiul (MDA)	89.12	~~162~~	165	172	–	172
