= Powerlifting at the 2016 Summer Paralympics – Men's 97 kg =

Powerlifting – Men's 97 kg at the XV Paralympic Games
- Venue: Riocentro
- Date: 14 September 2016
- Competitors: 11 from 11 nations
- Winning lift: 237.0 kg PR

Medalists
1st place, gold medalist(s)		Mohamed Eldib	Egypt
2nd place, silver medalist(s)		Qi Dong	China
3rd place, bronze medalist(s)		José de Jesús Castillo	Mexico

The men's 97 kg powerlifting event at the 2016 Summer Paralympics was contested on 14 September at Riocentro.

== Records ==
There are twenty powerlifting events, corresponding to ten weight classes each for men and women. The weight categories were significantly adjusted after the 2012 Games so most of the weights are new for 2016. As a result, no Paralympic record was available for this weight class prior to the competition. The existing world records were as follows.

Record Type	Weight	Country	Venue	Date
World record	243 kg	Mohamed Eldib (EGY)	Dubai	18 February 2016
Paralympic record	–	–	–	–

== Results ==
Rank	Name	Body weight (kg)	Attempts (kg)				Result (kg)
Rank	Name	Body weight (kg)	1	2	3	4	Result (kg)
1st place, gold medalist(s)	Mohamed Eldib (EGY)	94.57	233.0	~~237.0~~	237.0 PR	~~244~~	237.0
2nd place, silver medalist(s)	Qi Dong (CHN)	95.27	226.0	233.0	~~234.0~~	–	233.0
3rd place, bronze medalist(s)	José de Jesús Castillo (MEX)	96.41	227.0	229.0	~~234.0~~	–	229.0
4	Saman Razi (IRI)	95.66	221.0	~~226.0~~	~~229.0~~	–	221.0
5	Anton Kriukov (UKR)	95.97	220.0	~~227.0~~	~~229.0~~	–	220.0
6	Abdulazeez Ibrahim (NGR)	94.77	215.0	~~226.0~~	–	–	215.0
7	Jong Yee Khie (MAS)	94.73	202.0	~~210.0~~	~~213.0~~	–	202.0
8	Vadim Dukart (KAZ)	95.79	155.0	160.0	165.0	–	165.0
9	Akaki Jintcharadze (GEO)	96.28	150.0	~~155.0~~	155.0	–	155.0
-	Favio Torres Silva (COL)	95.74	~~211.0~~	~~213.0~~	~~213.0~~	–	NMR
-	Petar Milenkovic (SRB)	95.42	~~222.0~~	~~222.0~~	~~222.0~~	–	NMR
