= Egypt at the 1996 Summer Paralympics =

- IPC code: EGY
- NPC: Egyptian Paralympic Committee
- Website: paralympic.org.eg

in Atlanta
- Competitors: 31 (26 men and 5 women)
- Medals Ranked 21st: Gold 8 Silver 11 Bronze 11 Total 30

Summer Paralympics appearances (overview)
- 1972; 1976; 1980; 1984; 1988; 1992; 1996; 2000; 2004; 2008; 2012; 2016; 2020; 2024

Egypt competed at the 1996 Summer Paralympics in Atlanta, United States. They sent 31 athletes (26 men and 5 women), who won 30 total medals, 8 gold, 11 silver and 11 bronze. They participated in several sports including powerlifting. The team included powerlifters Ahmed Gomaa Mohamed Ahmed and Metwalli Mathana.

== Medallists ==
Medal	Name	Sport	Event
Gold	Ahmed Hassan Mahmoud	Athletics	Men's 400m T36
Gold	Ahmed Dahy	Athletics	Men's discus F41
Gold	Mohamed Gawad	Athletics	Men's discus F57
Gold	Ahmed Abd Elgawad	Athletics	Men's shot put F41
Gold	Karima Feleifal	Athletics	Women's discus F55-57
Gold	Zakia Abdin	Athletics	Women's javelin F55-57
Gold	Mervat Omar	Athletics	Women's shot put F55-57
Gold	Gomma G. Ahmed	Powerlifting	Men's 56 kg
Silver	Hany Elbehiry	Athletics	Men's discus F57
Silver	Ahmed Dahy	Athletics	Men's javelin F41
Silver	Ashraf Elsafi	Athletics	Men's shot put F41
Silver	Hany Elbehiry	Athletics	Men's shot put F57
Silver	Mervat Omar	Athletics	Women's discus F55-57
Silver	Zakia Abdin	Athletics	Women's shot put F55-57
Silver	Metwaly Mathna	Powerlifting	Men's 60 kg
Silver	Emadeldin Mohamed	Powerlifting	Men's 67.5 kg
Silver	Mostafa Hamed	Powerlifting	Men's 82.5 kg
Silver	Essam Attia	Swimming	Men's 50m backstroke S5
Bronze	Ahmed Hassan Mahmoud	Athletics	Men's 100m T36
Bronze	Ahmed Hassan Mahmoud	Athletics	Men's 200m T36
Bronze	Ahmed Abd Elgawad	Athletics	Men's discus F41
Bronze	Ayman Abou Elata	Athletics	Men's discus F46
Bronze	H. Abdel Latif	Athletics	Men's discus F56
Bronze	Ahmed Abd Elgawad	Athletics	Men's javelin F41
Bronze	Mohamed Hassan	Athletics	Men's javelin F57
Bronze	Shaaban El Khatib	Athletics	Men's shot put F57
Bronze	Sohir Elkoumy	Athletics	Women's shot put F55-57
Bronze	Abd Elmonem Farag	Powerlifting	Men's 75 kg
Bronze	Walid Abd Elkader	Swimming	Men's 50m butterfly S7

== See also ==
- Egypt at the Paralympics
- Egypt at the 1996 Summer Olympics
