= Athletics at the 1976 Summer Paralympics – Men's discus throw J1 =

Men's discus throw J1 at the V Paralympic Games
- Paralympic Athletics
- Competitors: 1 from 1 nation

Medalists
1st place, gold medalist(s)		Metwali Ahmed Khadr	Egypt

The Men's discus throw J1 was an event held in athletics at the 1976 Summer Paralympics in Toronto.

Metwali Ahmed Khadr of Egypt was the only competitor, and therefore needed only to record a valid throw in order to win the gold medal. He achieved a throw of 16.00.

Rank	Athlete	Points
1st place, gold medalist(s)	Metwali Ahmed Khadr (EGY)	16.00
