= Egypt at the 1988 Summer Paralympics =

- IPC code: EGY
- NPC: Egyptian Paralympic Committee
- Website: paralympic.org.eg

in Seoul
- Competitors: 46
- Medals Ranked 34th: Gold 1 Silver 3 Bronze 3 Total 7

Summer Paralympics appearances (overview)
- 1972; 1976; 1980; 1984; 1988; 1992; 1996; 2000; 2004; 2008; 2012; 2016; 2020; 2024

Egypt competed at the 1988 Summer Paralympics in Seoul, South Korea.

== Medals ==
46 competitors from Egypt won 7 medals including 1 gold, 3 silver and 3 bronze and finished 34th in the medal table.

== Powerlifting ==
Egypt won two silver medals in powerlifting at the 1988 Games.

== See also ==
- Egypt at the Paralympics
- Egypt at the 1988 Summer Olympics
