= Egypt at the 1980 Summer Paralympics =

- IPC code: EGY
- NPC: Egyptian Paralympic Committee
- Website: paralympic.org.eg

in Arnhem
- Competitors: 33
- Medals Ranked 22nd: Gold 4 Silver 7 Bronze 3 Total 14

Summer Paralympics appearances (overview)
- 1972; 1976; 1980; 1984; 1988; 1992; 1996; 2000; 2004; 2008; 2012; 2016; 2020; 2024

Egypt competed at the 1980 Summer Paralympics in Arnhem, Netherlands.

== Medals ==
33 competitors from Egypt won 14 medals including 4 gold, 7 silver and 3 bronze and finished 22nd in the medal table.

== Team ==
The team included Strange Khater, Hanan Ahmed Fathi, vegetables Metwally, Salem Zubayna, Mohammad Ahmed Salama, Najat Jaber Al-Ali, and Tamer Labib.

== Background ==
Egypt lacked a national disability sports federation for these Games. One would not be established until after these Games, ahead of the 1984 Games.

== See also ==
- Egypt at the Paralympics
