= Egypt at the 1984 Summer Paralympics =

- IPC code: EGY
- NPC: Egyptian Paralympic Committee
- Website: paralympic.org.eg

in Stoke Mandeville/New York
- Competitors: 28
- Medals Ranked 33rd: Gold 1 Silver 1 Bronze 5 Total 7

Summer Paralympics appearances (overview)
- 1972; 1976; 1980; 1984; 1988; 1992; 1996; 2000; 2004; 2008; 2012; 2016; 2020; 2024

Egypt competed at the 1984 Summer Paralympics in Stoke Mandeville, Great Britain and New York City, United States. The country's 28 representatives participated in several sports including goalball, winning 7 medals.

== Background ==
These were the first Games that Egypt participated in under the aegis of a national disability sports federation.

== Medals ==
28 competitors from Egypt won 7 medals including 1 gold, 1 silver and 5 bronze and finished 33rd in the medal table.

== Goalball ==
Egypt won a silver medal in goalball, losing the gold medal match to the United States.

== Wheelchair basketball ==
The men's wheelchair basketball event took place at Stoke Mandeville, England at the Ludwig Guttmann Sports Center. These were the first Games where players with a disability other than a spinal cord injury could compete in wheelchair basketball. Egypt's team included Sallama Abdel Aal, Ramadan Nel Assal, Yossri Aziz, Mohamed Malakouf, Essmat Mawgood, Mohamed Nada, Wagih Nagib, Ibrahim Abdel Samee, Mohamed Samir, and Mohamed Shaat. They finished with a record of 0 wins and 4 losses. They opened against France, losing 118 - 30. Their next game was against, where they went lost 108 - 13. Their third game was against Japan, where they lost 125 - 26. Their last game was against Australia, who crushed them 120 - 19. They finished last in Pool C.

== See also ==
- Egypt at the Paralympics
- Egypt at the 1984 Summer Olympics
