= Hamato =

Hamato may refer to:

- Hamato Yoshi
- Ibrahim Hamato
