= Egypt at the 2008 Summer Paralympics =

- IPC code: EGY
- NPC: Egyptian Paralympic Committee
- Website: paralympic.org.eg

in Beijing
- Competitors: 38 in 3 sports
- Flag bearer: Metwaly Ibrahim Mathna
- Medals Ranked 29th: Gold 4 Silver 4 Bronze 4 Total 12

Summer Paralympics appearances (overview)
- 1972; 1976; 1980; 1984; 1988; 1992; 1996; 2000; 2004; 2008; 2012; 2016; 2020; 2024

Egypt sent a delegation to compete at the 2008 Summer Paralympics in Beijing, China. The 38 member strong team won 12 medals, 4 gold, 4 silver and 4 bronze. Sports Egypt participated in included athletics, powerlifting and table tennis Among Egypt's representatives included Fatma Omar and Sherif Othman in powerlifting, Mohammed Beshta, Mahmoud El-Attar, Hossam Abdel Kader and Mohammed El-Sayed Abdel Kader in athletics and Fayza Hafez in table tennis.

== Medallists ==
Medal	Name	Sport	Event
Gold	Sherif Othman	Powerlifting	Men's 56kg
Gold	Metwaly Ibrahim Mathna	Athletics	Men's 67.5kg
Gold	Fatma Omar	Powerlifting	Women's 56kg
Gold	Heba Said Ahmed	Powerlifting	Women's 82.5kg
Silver	Mahmoud Ramadan Ellatar	Athletics	Men's javelin throw F57-58
Silver	Osama Elserngawy	Powerlifting	Men's 52kg
Silver	Amal Mahmoud Osman	Powerlifting	Women's 60kg
Silver	Randa Tageldin Mohamed	Powerlifting	Women's 75kg
Bronze	Yaser Abdelaziz El Sayed	Athletics	Men's javelin throw F55-56
Bronze	Shaban Yehia Ibrahim	Powerlifting	Men's 60kg
Bronze	Zeinab Sayed Oteify	Powerlifting	Men's 44kg
Bronze	Nadia Mohamed Ali	Powerlifting	Women's +82.5kg

== Sports ==
=== Athletics ===
==== Men's track ====
Athlete	Class	Event	Heats		Final	
Athlete	Class	Event	Result	Rank	Result	Rank
Hossam Eldin Mohamed Sewillam	T37	100m	12.94	16	did not advance	
Hossam Eldin Mohamed Sewillam	T37	200m	26.25	15	did not advance	

==== Men's field ====
Athlete	Class	Event	Final		
Athlete	Class	Event	Result	Points	Rank
Mahmoud Abdelsemia	F55-56	Discus throw	35.24	915	8
Yaser Abdelaziz El Sayed	F55-56	Javelin throw	30.54 SB	929	3rd place, bronze medalist(s)
Mohamed Mohamed Ramadan	F37-38	Discus throw	49.60 SB	964	6
Mahmoud Ramadan Elattar	F57-58	Discus throw	50.74	951	6
Mahmoud Ramadan Elattar	F57-58	Javelin throw	48.80 SB	1035	2nd place, silver medalist(s)
Mohamed Roshdy Beshta	F55-56	Shot put	11.35 SB	978	6

=== Powerlifting ===
==== Men ====
Athlete	Event	Result	Rank
Abd Elmonem Salah Farag	100kg	222.5	4
Osama Elserngawy	52kg	167.5	2nd place, silver medalist(s)
Shaban Yehia Ibrahim	60kg	195.0	3rd place, bronze medalist(s)
Metwaly Ibrahim Mathna	67.5kg	217.5 PR	1st place, gold medalist(s)
Hany Mohsen Abd Elhady	82.5kg	220.0	4
Sherif Othman	56kg	202.5 WR	1st place, gold medalist(s)
Mohamed Sobhy Elelfat	75kg	205.0	4

==== Women ====
Athlete	Event	Result	Rank
Heba Said Ahmed	82.5kg	155.0 WR	1st place, gold medalist(s)
Amal Mahmoud Osman	60kg	117.5	2nd place, silver medalist(s)
Nadia Mohamed Ali	+82.5kg	150.0	3rd place, bronze medalist(s)
Rania Alaa Eldin Morshedi	67.5kg	115.0	4
Fatma Omar	56kg	141.5 WR	1st place, gold medalist(s)
Zeinab Sayed Oteify	44kg	92.5	3rd place, bronze medalist(s)
Randa Tageldin Mohamed	75kg	135.0	2nd place, silver medalist(s)

=== Table tennis ===
==== Men ====
Athlete	Event	Preliminaries				Round of 16	Quarterfinals	Semifinals	Final / BM	
Athlete	Event	Opposition Result	Opposition Result	Opposition Result	Rank	Opposition Result	Opposition Result	Opposition Result	Opposition Result	Rank
Sameh Saleh	Men's singles C4-5	Thomas (FRA); W 3–1	D Rodriguez (ARG); W 3–0	—N/a	1 Q	Guo X (CHN); W 3–0	Bolldén (SWE); W 3–2	Jung E-c (KOR); L 1–3	Urhaug (NOR); L 0–3	4
Sayed Mohamed Youssef	Men's singles C7	Valera (ESP); L 1–3	Furlan (ITA); L 1–3	Qin X (CHN); W 3–0	4	did not advance				

==== Women ====
Athlete	Event	Preliminaries				Round of 16	Quarterfinals	Semifinals	Final / BM	
Athlete	Event	Opposition Result	Opposition Result	Opposition Result	Rank	Opposition Result	Opposition Result	Opposition Result	Opposition Result	Rank
Faiza Mahmoud Afify	Women's singles C6-7	Klymenko (UKR); W 3–2	Munoz (ARG); W 3–2	—N/a	1 Q	—N/a		Ovsyannikova (RUS); L 0–3	van Zon (NED); L 0–3	4
Angham Medhat Maghraby	Women's singles C10	Fan L (CHN); L 0–3	la Bourdonnaye (FRA); L 0–3	Karmayeva (RUS); L 0–3	4	did not advance				
Faiza Mahmoud Afify; Angham Medhat Maghraby	Women's team C6-10	—N/a				Czech Republic (CZE); L 1–3	did not advance			

=== Volleyball ===
The men's volleyball team didn't win any medals; they were defeated by Russia in the bronze medal match.

==== Players ====
- Ashrad Zaghloul Abd Alla
- Abd Elaal Mohamed Abd Elaal
- Rezek Abd Ellatif
- Abdel Nabi Hassan Abdel Latif
- Mohamed Abouelyazeid
- Taher Adel Elabahaey
- Hesham Salah Elshwikh
- Mohamed Abd Elhamed Emara
- Salah Atta Hassanein
- Hossam Massoud Massoud
- El Saad Mossa
- Ahmed Soliman

==== Tournament ====
7 September 2008; 19:30	Brazil (BRA)	0–3	Egypt (EGY)	China Agricultural University Gymnasium; Attendance: 1,000; Referees: Anton Probst (Germany)
7 September 2008; 19:30	(8–25, 14–25, 17–25)			China Agricultural University Gymnasium; Attendance: 1,000; Referees: Anton Probst (Germany)

9 September 2008; 11:35	Egypt (EGY)	0–3	Iran (IRI)	China Agricultural University Gymnasium; Attendance: 1,800; Referees: Khalid Salem Shanishah (Libya)
9 September 2008; 11:35	(25–27, 12–25, 18–25)			China Agricultural University Gymnasium; Attendance: 1,800; Referees: Khalid Salem Shanishah (Libya)

10 September 2008; 15:30	Japan (JPN)	0–3	Egypt (EGY)	China Agricultural University Gymnasium; Attendance: 600; Referees: Xia Xin (China)
10 September 2008; 15:30	(8–25, 11–25, 15–25)			China Agricultural University Gymnasium; Attendance: 600; Referees: Xia Xin (China)

Semifinal

12 September 2008; 12:30	Egypt (EGY)	0–3	Bosnia and Herzegovina (BIH)	China Agricultural University Gymnasium; Attendance: 400; Referees: Anton Probst (Germany)
12 September 2008; 12:30	(18–25, 21–25, 20–25)			China Agricultural University Gymnasium; Attendance: 400; Referees: Anton Probst (Germany)

Bronze medal match

15 September 2008; 16:00	Russia (RUS)	3-2	Egypt (EGY)	China Agricultural University Gymnasium; Attendance: 2,400; Referees: Martijn Meulenkamp (Netherlands)
15 September 2008; 16:00	(22–25, 25–16, 19–25, 25–20, 15–9)			China Agricultural University Gymnasium; Attendance: 2,400; Referees: Martijn Meulenkamp (Netherlands)

== See also ==
- Egypt at the Paralympics
- Egypt at the 2008 Summer Olympics
