= Fabio Torres =

Colombian Paralympic powerlifter

Personal information
- Full name: Fabio Torres Silva
- Born: 7 May 1976 (age 50)

Sport
- Country: Colombia
- Sport: Paralympic powerlifting
Medal record
Representing Colombia
Men's paralympic powerlifting
Paralympic Games
Bronze medal – third place	2020 Tokyo	97 kg
Bronze medal – third place	2024 Paris	97 kg
World Championships
Bronze medal – third place	2017 Mexico City	97 kg
Bronze medal – third place	2019 Nur-Sultan	97 kg
Bronze medal – third place	2023 Dubai	97 kg total lift
Parapan American Games
Gold medal – first place	2023 Santiago	97 kg
Silver medal – second place	2015 Toronto	97 kg
Silver medal – second place	2019 Lima	107 kg
South American Para Games
Gold medal – first place	2026 Valledupar	97 kg
Gold medal – first place	2026 Valledupar	Team

Fabio Torres Silva (born 7 May 1976) is a Colombian Paralympic powerlifter. He won the bronze medal in the men's 97 kg event at the 2020 Summer Paralympics held in Tokyo, Japan. He also won bronze in his event at the 2024 Summer Paralympics held in Paris, France.
