= Egypt at the Paralympics =

- IPC code: EGY
- NPC: Egyptian Paralympic Committee
- Website: paralympic.org.eg
- Medals: Gold 51 Silver 71 Bronze 68 Total 190

Summer appearances
- 1972; 1976; 1980; 1984; 1988; 1992; 1996; 2000; 2004; 2008; 2012; 2016; 2020; 2024

Egypt has been participating in the Paralympic Games since 1972, and has participated in every edition of the Summer Games since then.

== History ==
Egypt was involved very early in the Paralympic movement. Egyptians were participating in the Stoke-Mandeville Games by 1954. Historically, the Egyptian Paralympic Committee has invested in very few sports. These include on the team side wheelchair basketball, football for the deaf, goalball and sitting volleyball. On the individual sport side, they have historically supported powerlifting, swimming, athletics and table tennis. Archery, cycling, shooting and lawn bowls are supported only at the national level, not the international level.

== Medals ==
=== Medals by Summer Games ===
Games	Athletes	Gold	Silver	Bronze	Total	Rank
(Italy) 1960 Rome	did not participate					
(Japan) 1964 Tokyo	did not participate					
(Israel) 1968 Tel Aviv	did not participate					
(Germany) Heidelberg 1972	1	0	0	0	0	-
(Canada) Toronto 1976	27	5	2	1	8	20
(Netherlands) Arnhem 1980	33	4	7	3	14	22
(United States) New York 1984	28	1	1	5	7	33
(South Korea) Seoul 1988	46	1	3	3	7	34
(Spain) Barcelona 1992	41	7	6	7	20	19
(United States) Atlanta 1996	31	8	11	11	30	21
(Australia) Sydney 2000	45	6	12	10	28	23
(Greece) Athens 2004	46	6	9	8	23	23
(China) Beijing 2008	38	4	4	4	12	29
(United Kingdom) London 2012	40	4	4	7	15	23
(Brazil) Rio de Janeiro 2016	44	3	5	4	12	30
(Japan) Tokyo 2020	49	0	5	2	7	64
(France) Paris 2024	54	2	2	3	7	41
(United States) Los Angeles 2028
(Australia) Brisbane 2032
Total		51	71	68	190	30

=== Medals by Winter Games ===
Games	Athletes	Gold	Silver	Bronze	Total	Rank
(Sweden) Örnsköldsvik 1976	did not participate					
(Norway) Geilo 1980	did not participate					
(Austria) Innsbruck 1984	did not participate					
(Austria) Innsbruck 1988	did not participate					
(France) Albertville 1992	did not participate					
(Norway) Lillehammer 1994	did not participate					
(Japan) Nagano 1998	did not participate					
(United States) Salt Lake City 2002	did not participate					
(Italy) Turin 2006	did not participate					
(Canada) Vancouver 2010	did not participate					
(Russia) Sochi 2014	did not participate					
(South Korea) Pyeongchang 2018	did not participate					
(China) Beijing 2022	Future event					
Total		0	0	0	0	−

=== Medals by Summer Sport ===
Games	Gold	Silver	Bronze	Total
Athletics	26	28	33	87
Powerlifting	22	28	19	69
Swimming	1	3	6	10
Goalball	0	1	2	3
Table tennis	0	1	2	3
Volleyball	0	0	2	2
Lawn Bowls	0	1	0	1
Weightlifting	0	2	0	2
Total	49	64	64	177

=== Medals by Winter Sport ===
Games	Gold	Silver	Bronze	Total
Total	0	0	0	0

== Multi-medalists ==
Egyptian athletes who have won at least three gold medals or five or more medals of any colour.

No.	Athlete	Sport	Years	Games	Gender	Gold	Silver	Bronze	Total
1	Fatma Omar	Powerlifting	2000-2016	5	F	4	1	0	5
2	Sherif Othman	Powerlifting	2008-2020	4	M	3	1	0	4
3	Ahmed Hassan Mahmoud	Athletics	1992-2000	3	M	1	1	4	8

== See also ==
- Egypt at the Olympics
- Egypt at the African Games
- Egypt at the Mediterranean Games
- Sports in Egypt
