= Powerlifting at the 2016 Summer Paralympics – Men's +107 kg =

Men's +107 kg powerlifting event at the 2016 Summer Paralympics

Powerlifting – Men's 107 kg at the XV Paralympic Games
- Venue: Riocentro
- Date: 14 September 2016
- Competitors: 8 from 8 nations
- Winning lift: 310.0 kg WR

Medalists
1st place, gold medalist(s)		Siamand Rahman	Iran
2nd place, silver medalist(s)		Amr Mosaad	Egypt
3rd place, bronze medalist(s)		Jamil Elshebli	Jordan

The men's +107 kg powerlifting event at the 2016 Summer Paralympics was contested on 14 September at Riocentro..

== Records ==
There are twenty powerlifting events, corresponding to ten weight classes each for men and women. The weight categories were significantly adjusted after the 2012 Games so most of the weights are new for 2016. As a result, no Paralympic record was available for this weight class prior to the competition. The existing world records were as follows.

Record Type	Weight	Country	Venue	Date
World record	296 kg	Siamand Rahman (IRI)	Dubai	19 February 2016
Paralympic record	–	–	–	–

== Results ==
Rank	Name	Body weight (kg)	Attempts (kg)				Result (kg)
Rank	Name	Body weight (kg)	1	2	3	4	Result (kg)
1st place, gold medalist(s)	Siamand Rahman (IRI)	169.03	270.0	300.0	305.0	310.0 WR PR	305.0
2nd place, silver medalist(s)	Amr Mosaad (EGY)	136.43	228.0	~~231.0~~	235.0	-	235.0
3rd place, bronze medalist(s)	Jamil Elshebli (JOR)	118.11	~~230.0~~	231.0	234.0	-	234.0
4	Konstantinos Dimou (GRE)	152.51	220.0	~~229.0~~	~~229.0~~	-	220.0
5	Sándor Sas (HUN)	122.56	~~207.0~~	207.0	~~228.0~~	-	207.0
6	Marek Kamzík (SVK)	118.0	162.0	170.0	~~175.0~~	-	170.0
-	Chun Keun-bae (KOR)	152.0	~~227.0~~	~~231.0~~	~~232.0~~	-	NMR
-	Ahmed Albaloushi (UAE)	115.2	~~200.0~~	~~200.0~~	~~200.0~~	-	NMR
