= Laura Cerero Gabriel =

Mexican Paralympic powerlifter

Personal information
- Nickname: La Reina Zapoteca (Zapotec Queen)
- Born: Oaxaca City, Mexico
- Height: 1.40 m (4 ft 7 in)

Sport
- Country: Mexico
- Sport: Paralympic powerlifting
- Disability: Polio
Medal record
Paralympic powerlifting
Representing Mexico
Paralympic Games
Bronze medal – third place	2000 Sydney	40kg
Bronze medal – third place	2004 Athens	40kg
Bronze medal – third place	2008 Beijing	40kg
World Championships
Silver medal – second place	2002 Kuala Lumpur	40kg
Silver medal – second place	2006 Busan	40kg
Bronze medal – third place	2010 Kuala Lumpur	44kg
Bronze medal – third place	2014 Dubai	45kg
Parapan American Games
Gold medal – first place	2003 Mar del Plata	40kg
Silver medal – second place	2007 Rio de Janeiro	40kg
Silver medal – second place	2011 Guadalajara	Lightweight
Silver medal – second place	2015 Toronto	41 & 45kg

Laura Cerero Gabriel is a Mexican Paralympic powerlifter who competes in international elite events. She is a triple Paralympic bronze medalist, double Parapan American Games silver medalist and has won four medals at the World Para Powerlifting Championships.
