= Egypt at the 1992 Summer Paralympics =

- IPC code: EGY
- NPC: Egyptian Paralympic Committee
- Website: paralympic.org.eg

in Barcelona
- Competitors: 41
- Medals Ranked 19th: Gold 7 Silver 6 Bronze 7 Total 20

Summer Paralympics appearances (overview)
- 1972; 1976; 1980; 1984; 1988; 1992; 1996; 2000; 2004; 2008; 2012; 2016; 2020; 2024

Egypt competed at the 1992 Summer Paralympics in Barcelona, Spain. The 41 member team competed in athletics, powerlifting and shooting. They won 20 medals including 7 gold, 6 silver and 7 bronze, finishing 19th on the medal table. Members of the team included athletics competitors Ahmed Mohamed, Said Afifi, Aymen Ibrahim, Hany Mohamed, Mohamed Abdulla Mohamed and Mohamed Said, and shooter Sherif Abd Alla.

== Medals ==
41 competitors from Egypt won 20 medals including 7 gold, 6 silver and 7 bronze to finish 19th in the medal table. Medalists included Ahmed Mohamed, Hany Mohamed, Mohamed Abdulla Mohamed and Mohamed Said in track and field.

== Team ==
Egypt was represented by 41 competitors in Barcelona, all of whom were male. Members of the team included athletics competitors Ahmed Mohamed, Said Afifi, Aymen Ibrahim, Hany Mohamed, Mohamed Abdulla Mohamed and Mohamed Said, powerlifter Ahmed Gomaa Mohamed Ahmed, and shooter Sherif Abd Alla.

== Athletics ==
Ahmed Mohamed represented Egypt in the Men's Discus THS2, finishing fourth in the 22 deep field. His best throw was 37.92m, short of the 38.96 m distance thrown by Paralympic bronze medalist Roberto Simonazzi of Germany. He then won gold in the Men's Javelin THS2 event, with a Paralympic Record throw of 48.30m.

Aymen Ibrahim competed in the seven competitor deep Men's Discus THS4 event. He finished fifth with a throw of 38.10m, narrowly losing out on bronze. That was won by the Czech Republic's Dusan Leipert, who had a throw of 38.48m. Competing in the seven deep Men's Javelin THS4 event, he finished fifth with a throw of 32.48m, way off medal winning distance.

Hany Mohamed was another of Egypt's gold medalist in Barcelona. In the Men's Discus THW7 event, he set a world record of 34.64m. Fellow Egyptian Mohamed Abdulla Mohamed finished with a silver in the event with a throw of 34.36m. A third Egyptian in the event, Mohamed Said, finished fourteenth with a distance of 25.18m. Hany Mohamed then claimed a second gold in the Men's Shot Put THW7 event, with a world record throw of 10.61m. Mohamed Abdulla Mohamed finished sixth in the event, with a best throw of 8.95m. Mohamed Said finished ninth on a best throw of 8.44m.

Mohamed Said also competed in the Men's Javelin THW7 event. His distance of 37.58m was good enough to claim silver, and a meter and a half short of the world record gold medal winning throw by Kuwait's Aly Mohamed. Hany Mohamed finished fifth in that event, with a best throw of 33.14m. Mohamed Abdulla Mohamed finished twenty-third and last with a best throw of 16.58m.

Said Afifi competed in the Men's Discus THS3 event. His throw of 42.50m won him a silver medal.

== Powerlifting ==
Egypt first competed in powerlifting at the Paralympic Games in Barcelona. They won 1 gold, 2 silver and 3 bronze medals in the sport in Barcelona.

Ahmed Gomaa Mohamed Ahmed made his Paralympic debut at the 1992 Games. He claimed gold and set a world record in Barcelona in the men's -52 kg class. He would go on to duplicate both fetes at the 1996 and 2000 Games in the men's -56 kg class. Mohamed Ahmed took up the sport in 1984, and decided to compete internationally because he was able to lift more than his able-bodied counterparts in Egypt.

== Shooting ==
Sherif Abd Alla competed in the Men's Air Pistol SH2 event, finishing eighteenth in the preliminary round with 527 points. He did not make the final.

== See also ==
- Egypt at the Paralympics
- Egypt at the 1992 Summer Olympics
