= Egypt at the 1976 Summer Paralympics =

- IPC code: EGY
- NPC: Egyptian Paralympic Committee
- Website: paralympic.org.eg

in Toronto
- Competitors: 27
- Medals Ranked 20th: Gold 5 Silver 2 Bronze 1 Total 8

Summer Paralympics appearances (overview)
- 1972; 1976; 1980; 1984; 1988; 1992; 1996; 2000; 2004; 2008; 2012; 2016; 2020; 2024

Egypt sent a delegation to compete at the 1976 Summer Paralympics in Toronto, Ontario, Canada. Its athletes rank twentieth in the overall medal count. Metwali Ahmed Jadr and Said Dowara won gold medals.

== See also ==
- 1976 Summer Paralympics
- Egypt at the 1976 Summer Olympics
