= Pernell Cooper =

American Paralympic powerlifter

Personal information
- Born: 28 June 1963
- Died: 27 January 2016 (aged 52) Atlanta, Georgia, U.S.
- Resting place: Inglewood Park Cemetery, Inglewood, California

Sport
- Country: United States
- Sport: Paralympic powerlifting
Medal record
Paralympic powerlifting
Representing United States
Paralympic Games
| Gold medal – first place | 2000 Sydney | Men's +100kg |
| Bronze medal – third place | 1996 Atlanta | Men's +100kg |

Pernell Cooper (June 28, 1963 – January 27, 2016) was an American Paralympic powerlifter. He competed at two Paralympic Games and was a Paralympic champion at the 2000 Summer Paralympics and a bronze medalist at the 1996 Summer Paralympics.
