= Ibrahim Ali (athlete) =

Egyptian Paralympic athlete

Medal record

Paralympic athletics

Representing Egypt

Paralympic Games
Silver medal – second place	2000 Sydney	Discus Throw - F57
Silver medal – second place	2004 Athens	Javelin Throw - F57
Bronze medal – third place	2000 Sydney	Javelin Throw - F57

Ibrahim Ali is a paralympic athlete from Egypt competing mainly in category F57 javelin and discus events.

Ibrahim first competed in the Paralympics in 2000 where he won a silver in the discus and a bronze in the javelin. He returned in 2004 where he improved to silver in the javelin but could not make the top three in the discus.
