= Hossam Abd Ellattif =

Egyptian Paralympic athlete (born 1971)

Medal record

Paralympic athletics

Representing Egypt

Paralympic Games
Bronze medal – third place	2000 Sydney	Discus Throw - F57
Bronze medal – third place	2004 Athens	Discus Throw - F57

Hossam Abd Ellatif (Arabic: حسام عبد اللطيف; born 8 March 1971) is a paralympic athlete from Egypt competing mainly in category F57 shot put and discus events.

Hossam competed in the shot put and discus in both the 2000 and 2004 Summer Paralympics both times winning bronze in the F57 discus.
