= Ibrahim Allam =

Egyptian Paralympic athlete

Medal record

Paralympic athletics

Representing Egypt

Paralympic Games
Gold medal – first place	2000 Sydney	Shot Put - F58
Gold medal – first place	2004 Athens	Shot Put - F58

Ibrahim Allam is a paralympic athlete from Egypt competing mainly in category F58 shot put events.

Ibrahim is a two time Paralympic gold medalist, winning the F58 shot put in both the 2000 and 2004 Summer Paralympics.
