= Mahmoud Elatar =

Egyptian Paralympic athlete

Medal record

Paralympic athletics

Representing Egypt

Paralympic Games
Silver medal – second place	2004 Athens	Discus Throw - F58
Silver medal – second place	2004 Athens	Javelin Throw - F58
Bronze medal – third place	2000 Sydney	Discus Throw - F58
Bronze medal – third place	2000 Sydney	Javelin Throw - F58

Mohmoud Elatar is a paralympic athlete from Egypt competing mainly in category F58 javelin and discus events.

Mahmoud competed in both the F58 discus and javelin events at both the 2000 and 2004 Summer Paralympics winning gold in both events at the 2000 games and silver in both at the 2004 games.
