= Ahmed Hassan Mahmoud =

Egyptian Paralympic athlete

Medal record

Paralympic athletics

Representing Egypt

Paralympic Games
Gold medal – first place	1996 Atlanta	400 metres - T36
Silver medal – second place	2000 Sydney	400 metres - T37
Bronze medal – third place	1992 Barcelona	400 metres - C7
Bronze medal – third place	1996 Atlanta	100 metres - T36
Bronze medal – third place	1996 Atlanta	200 metres - T36
Bronze medal – third place	2000 Sydney	200 metres - T37

Ahmed Hassan Mahmoud is a paralympic athlete from Egypt competing mainly in category T37 sprint events.

Ahmed competed in three Paralympics firstly in 1992 where he competed in the C7 400m, winning a bronze medal. In the 1996 Summer Paralympics in Atlanta he improved to win the T36 400m gold medal and also took bronze in the 100m and 200m. His final appearance came in 2000 where he won a silver in the T37 400m and a bronze in the 200m as well as competing in the 100m.
