= Mahmoud Attia =

Egyptian Paralympic powerlifter

Mahmoud Attia (born 12 August 1981) is an Egyptian Paralympic powerlifter. He won silver in the Men's 72 kg in 2020.
