= Hany Elbehiry =

Egyptian Paralympic athlete

Medal record

Paralympic athletics

Representing Egypt

Paralympic Games
Silver medal – second place	1996 Atlanta	Discus Throw - F57
Silver medal – second place	1996 Atlanta	Shot put - F57
Silver medal – second place	2000 Sydney	Shot put - F58
Bronze medal – third place	2000 Sydney	Javelin Throw - F58
Bronze medal – third place	2004 Athens	Shot put - F58

Hany Elbehiry is a paralympic athlete from Egypt competing mainly in category F58 shot put events.

Hany has competed in three Paralympics winning 5 medals. His first games were in 1996 where he won silver in both the F57 shot put and discus. In the 2000 Summer Paralympics he won a second shot put silver in the F58 class and also won the bronze medal in the javelin but could not match his 1996 performance in the discus only managing to finish fourth behind two Egyptian teammates. His third and final games in 2004 brought him a third medal in the shot put, this time a bronze.
