= Amr Mosaad =

Egyptian Paralympic powerlifter

Sport
- Country: Egypt
- Sport: Paralympic powerlifting
- Weight class: +107 kg
Medal record
Summer Paralympics
Silver medal – second place	2016 Rio de Janeiro	+107 kg

Amr Mosaad is an Egyptian Paralympic powerlifter. He represented Egypt at the 2016 Summer Paralympics held in Rio de Janeiro, Brazil and he won the silver medal in the men's +107 kg event. He also competed in the men's +107 kg event at the 2020 Summer Paralympics held in Tokyo, Japan.
