= Rehab Ahmed =

Egyptian Paralympic powerlifter

Personal information
- Born: 2 March 1991 (age 35)

Sport
- Country: Egypt
- Sport: Paralympic powerlifting
- Weight class: 50 kg
Medal record
Paralympic Games
Gold medal – first place	2024 Paris	55 kg
Silver medal – second place	2016 Rio de Janeiro	50 kg
Silver medal – second place	2020 Tokyo	50 kg
World Championships
Gold medal – first place	2017 Mexico City	50 kg
Gold medal – first place	2019 Nur-Sultan	50 kg
Gold medal – first place	2019 Nur-Sultan	Mixed team
Gold medal – first place	2021 Tbilisi	50 kg

Rehab Ahmed (born 2 March 1991) is an Egyptian Paralympic powerlifter. She is a three-time medalist, including gold, at the Summer Paralympics and a three-time gold medalist at the World Para Powerlifting Championships.

== Career ==
She represented Egypt at the 2016 Summer Paralympics held in Rio de Janeiro, Brazil and she won the silver medal in the women's 50 kg event. She also won the silver medal in the women's 50 kg event at the 2020 Summer Paralympics held in Tokyo, Japan. She also set a new Paralympic Record of 117 kg in her first lift which she then improved to 120 kg in her second lift.

She also won the gold medal in the women's 50 kg event at the 2017 World Championships held in Mexico City, Mexico, the 2019 World Championships held in Nur-Sultan, Kazakhstan and the 2021 World Championships held in Tbilisi, Georgia.

== Results ==
Year	Venue	Weight	Attempts (kg)				Total	Rank
Year	Venue	Weight	1	2	3	4	Total	Rank
Summer Paralympics
2016	Rio de Janeiro, Brazil	50 kg	~~102~~	102	104	~~108~~	104	2nd place, silver medalist(s)
2021	Tokyo, Japan	50 kg	117	120 PR	~~121~~	–	120	2nd place, silver medalist(s)
