= Ibrahim Hamadtou =

Egyptian para table tennis player

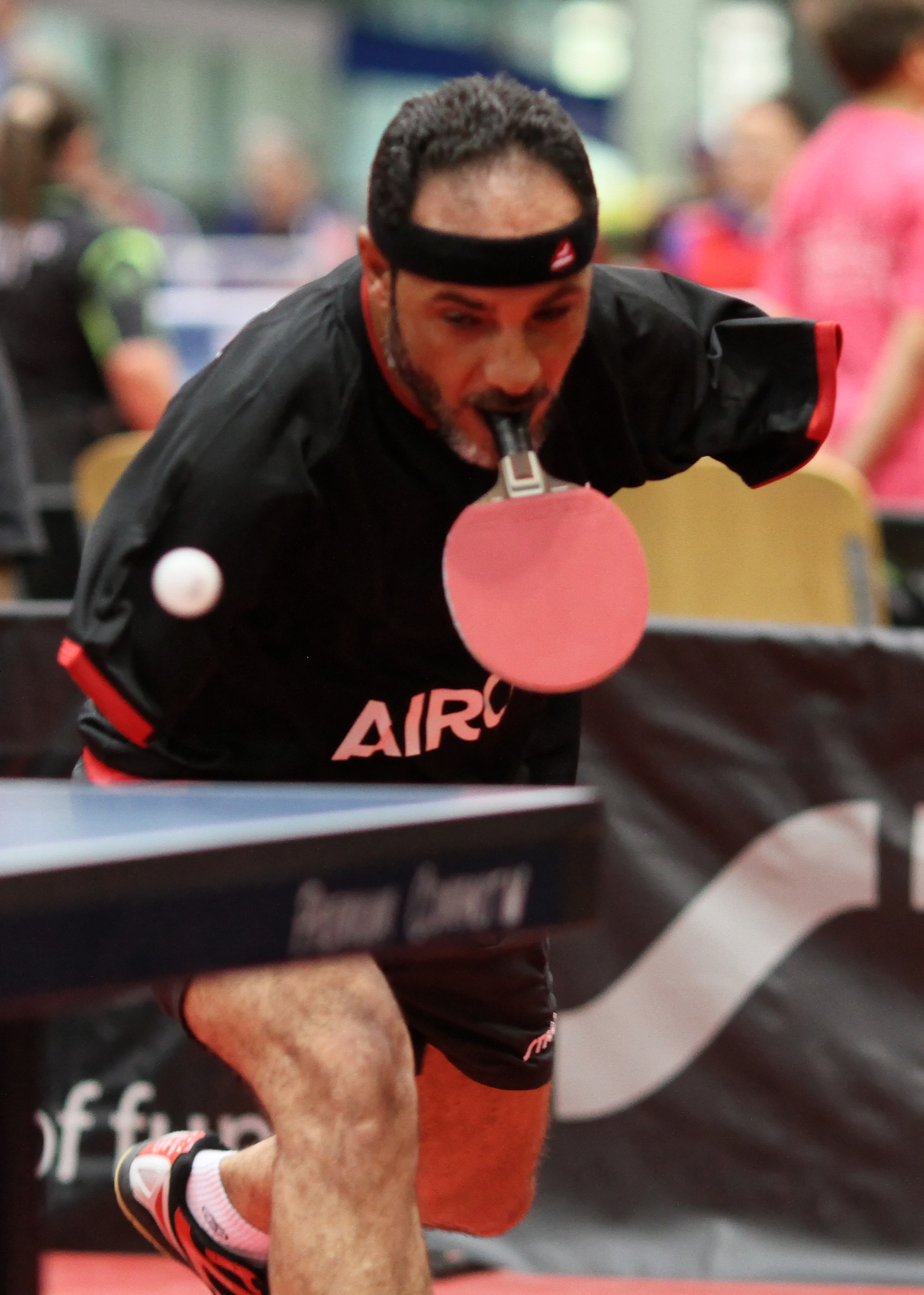
- Hamadtou in 2015

Personal information
- Full name: Ibrahim Al Husseini Hamadtou; Ibrahim Elhusseiny Hamadtou
- Nationality: Egyptian
- Born: 1 July 1973 (age 53) Damietta, Egypt

Sport
- Country: Egypt
- Sport: Para table tennis
- Disability class: S6

Achievements and titles
- Highest world ranking: 32 (2006)
Medal record
Men's para table tennis
Representing Egypt
African Championships
Bronze medal – third place	2023 Giza	Mixed doubles class 14-17
Silver medal – second place	2015 Agadir	Singles class 6
Silver medal – second place	2013 Sharm el Sheikh	Singles class 6
Silver medal – second place	2011 Ismailia	Teams class 6-8

Ibrahim Al Husseini Hamadtou (born 1 July 1973),also known as Ibrahim Elhusseiny Hamadtou, is an Egyptian para table tennis champion, winning several honors over the years, including the silver medals in the African Para Table Tennis Championships in 2011 and 2013.

Hamadtou lost both his arms as the result of a train accident when he was 10. In an interview with CNN, he said, "In our village, we could only play, at that time, table tennis and soccer – that's why I played both. It was [logical] to play soccer first due to my case; then I played table tennis as a challenge." It took nearly a year for Hamadtou to learn to play table tennis with the bat in his mouth; he began playing competitively in 2004.

Hamadtou has also won an appreciation award under the 6th Edition of the Mohammed bin Rashid Al Maktoum Creative Sports Award for the category of "athlete who achieved success in sports despite major humanitarian challenges (category of people with special needs)" after earning second place and winning the silver medal during the African Para Table Tennis Championships in December 2013.

He represented Egypt in the 2016 and 2020 Summer Paralympic Games in Rio de Janeiro and Tokyo.

== Family ==
Hamadtou is married and is a father of three children.
