= Taha Abdelmagid =

Egyptian Paralympic powerlifter (born 1987)

Personal information
- Born: 8 June 1987 (age 39) Cairo, Egypt
Medal record
Representing Egypt
Men's powerlifting
Paralympic Games
Bronze medal – third place	2012 London	−48 kg
World Championships
Bronze medal – third place	2021 Tbilisi	−54 kg

Taha Abdelmagid (born 8 June 1987) is a powerlifter from Egypt. At the 2012 Summer Paralympics he won a bronze medal in the men's 48 kg powerlifting event, lifting 165 kg (364 lb).

He won the bronze medal in the men's 54 kg event at the 2021 World Para Powerlifting Championships held in Tbilisi, Georgia.
