= Metawa Abouelkhir =

Egyptian Paralympic athlete

Personal information
- Nationality: Egyptian
- Born: 20 October 1976 (age 49)

Sport
- Country: Egypt
- Sport: Athletics
- Disability class: F57
- Events: discus throw, shot put
Medal record
Paralympic athletics
Representing Egypt
Paralympic Games
Silver medal – second place	2000 Sydney	Discus F58
Bronze medal – third place	2012 London	Discus F57–58
IPC Athletics World Championships
Gold medal – first place	2002 Lille	Discus F57/58
Silver medal – second place	2011 Christchurch	Discus F57/58
Bronze medal – third place	2006 Assen	Discus F58
Sitting volleyball
Representing Egypt
Paralympic Games
Bronze medal – third place	2016 Rio	Sitting volleyball
Bronze medal – third place	2024 Paris	Sitting volleyball

Metawa Abouelkhir (born 20 October 1976) is a Paralympian athlete from Egypt competing mainly in category F57 throwing events.

== Athletics career ==
Abouelkhir first competed in a Summer Paralympics the 2000 Summer Paralympics in Sydney, Australia. There he competed in the F58 discus throw, winning silver with a distance of 50.75 metres. Four years later he appeared at the 2004 Summer Paralympics in Athens, where he entered both the discus and shot put, but failed to reach the podium in either. He missed the Beijing Games, but returned for the 2012 Paralympics in London, winning the bronze in the F57/58 discus.

As well as Paralympic success, Abouelkhir has also won medals at World Championship level, winning medals at three different tournaments. His most successful World Championships was at the 2002 Lille Games, winning gold in the F57/58 discus throw.
