= Hany Abdelhady =

Egyptian Paralympic powerlifter

Personal information
- Born: 19 May 1980 (age 46) Cairo, Egypt

Sport
- Country: Egypt
- Sport: Paralympic powerlifting
Medal record
Paralympic Games
Gold medal – first place	2012 London	90 kg
Bronze medal – third place	2020 Tokyo	88 kg
World Championships
Gold medal – first place	2010 Kuala Lumpur	90 kg
Silver medal – second place	2019 Nur-Sultan	88 kg
Silver medal – second place	2021 Tbilisi	97 kg

Hany Abdelhady (born 19 May 1980) is an Egyptian Paralympic powerlifter. He won the gold medal in the men's 90 kg event at the 2012 Summer Paralympics held in London, United Kingdom. He also won the gold medal in his event at the 2010 IPC Powerlifting World Championships held in Kuala Lumpur, Malaysia.

He won the bronze medal in the men's 88 kg event at the 2020 Summer Paralympics held in Tokyo, Japan. He also competed in the men's 88 kg event at the 2016 Summer Paralympics held in Rio de Janeiro, Brazil, and the men's 97 kg event at the 2024 Summer Paralympics.

In 2021, he won the silver medal in his event at the 2021 World Para Powerlifting Championships held in Tbilisi, Georgia.
