= Amal Mahmoud Osman =

Egyptian powerlifter

Personal information
- National team: Egypt
- Born: 21 October 1978 (age 47)

Sport
- Country: Egypt
- Sport: Powerlifting
- Weight class: -67 kg
Medal record
Women's powerlifting
Representing Egypt
African Games
| Bronze medal – third place | 2015 Brazzaville | -67 & -73 kg |
IPC Powerlifting World Championships
| Silver medal – second place | 2014 Dubai | -67 kg |
Summer Paralympics
| Silver medal – second place | 2008 Beijing | -60 kg |
| Bronze medal – third place | 2012 London | -60 kg |
| Bronze medal – third place | 2016 Rio de Janeiro | -67 kg |
- Updated on 5 November 2017

Amal Mahmoud Osman (born 21 October 1978), also known as Amal Mahmoud Hanafy, is an Egyptian powerlifter who competes on behalf of her country. She has won medals at three successive Summer Paralympics.

== Career ==
Mahmoud competed in her first Summer Paralympics at the 2008 Games in Beijing, China. She won the silver medal in the 60 kilograms (130 lb) powerlifting category behind China's Bian Jianxin. Jianxin broke the World and Paralympic records twice in successive lifts to win the gold medal. At the 2012 Summer Paralympics in London, England, Mahmoud competed once again in the same category, this time winning the bronze medal following a lift of 118 kilograms (260 lb). Amalia Pérez won gold for Mexico, with a new Paralympic record of 135 kilograms (298 lb).

At the 2016 Summer Paralympics in Rio de Janeiro, Brazil, Mahmoud won the bronze medal in the 67 kilograms (148 lb) with a lift of 108 kilograms (238 lb). China's Yujiao Tan secured the gold medal, while Raushan Koishibayeva won the silver for Kazakhstan. Following the games, Mahmoud was one of the medal winners who was invited to meet Abdel Fattah el-Sisi, President of Egypt.
