= Mohamed Eldib =

Egyptian Paralympic powerlifter

Personal information
- Born: 7 January 1979 (age 47)

Sport
- Country: Egypt
- Sport: Paralympic powerlifting

Mohamed Eldib (born 7 January 1979) is an Egyptian powerlifter. At the 2012 Summer Paralympics he won gold at the -100 kg category, with the new world record (249 kg).
