= Egyptian Paralympic Committee =

National Paralympic Committee of Egypt

National Paralympic Committee
- Country: Egypt
- Code: EGY
- Continental association: APC
- Headquarters: Cairo, Egypt
- President: Hossam Eldin Mostafa
- Website: paralympic.org.eg

The Egyptian Paralympic Committee (Arabic: اللجنة البارالمبية المصرية) is the National Paralympic Committee in Egypt for the Paralympic Games movement. It is a non-profit organisation that selects teams, and raises funds to send Egyptian competitors to Paralympic events organised by the International Paralympic Committee (IPC).

== See also ==
- Egypt at the Paralympics
