= Iran at the Paralympics =

- IPC code: IRI
- NPC: I.R. Iran National Paralympic Committee
- Website: www.paralympic.ir
- Medals: Gold 75 Silver 58 Bronze 52 Total 185

Summer appearances
- 1988; 1992; 1996; 2000; 2004; 2008; 2012; 2016; 2020; 2024

Winter appearances
- 1998; 2002; 2006; 2010; 2014; 2018; 2022; 2026

Iran first competed at the Paralympic Games in 1988, at the Summer Games in Seoul, South Korea.

== Medal tables ==
=== Medals by Summer Games ===
Games	Athletes	Gold	Silver	Bronze	Total	Rank
(Italy) 1960 Rome	Did not participate					
(Japan) 1964 Tokyo	Did not participate					
(Israel) 1968 Tel Aviv	Did not participate					
(Germany) 1972 Heidelberg	Did not participate					
(Canada) 1976 Toronto	Did not participate					
(Netherlands) 1980 Arnhem	Did not participate					
(United Kingdom) 1984 Stoke Mandeville	Did not participate					
(South Korea) 1988 Seoul	35	4	1	3	8	28
(Spain) 1992 Barcelona	29	1	2	1	4	41
(United States) 1996 Atlanta	30	9	5	3	17	20
(Australia) 2000 Sydney	40	12	4	7	23	16
(Greece) 2004 Athens	89	6	3	13	23	23
(China) 2008 Beijing	72	5	6	3	14	22
(United Kingdom) 2012 London	79	10	7	7	24	11
(Brazil) 2016 Rio de Janeiro	110	8	9	7	24	15
(Japan) 2020 Tokyo	62	12	11	1	24	13
(France) 2024 Paris	66	8	10	7	25	14
(United States) 2028 Los Angeles	Future event					
(Australia) 2032 Brisbane	Future event					
Total		75	58	52	185	29

=== Medals by Winter Games ===
Games	Athletes	Gold	Silver	Bronze	Total	Rank
(Sweden) 1976 Örnsköldsvik	Did not participate					
(Norway) 1980 Geilo	Did not participate					
(Austria) 1984 Innsbruck	Did not participate					
(Austria) 1988 Innsbruck	Did not participate					
(France) 1992 Albertville	Did not participate					
(Norway) 1994 Lillehammer	Did not participate					
(Japan) 1998 Nagano	2	0	0	0	0	—
(United States) 2002 Salt Lake City	1	0	0	0	0	—
(Italy) 2006 Turin	1	0	0	0	0	—
(Canada) 2010 Vancouver	1	0	0	0	0	—
(Russia) 2014 Sochi	1	0	0	0	0	—
(South Korea) 2018 Pyeongchang	5	0	0	0	0	—
(China) 2022 Beijing	4	0	0	0	0	—
(Italy) 2026 Milano- Cortina	1	Withdrew				
Total		0	0	0	0	—

=== Medals by Summer Sport ===
Games	Gold	Silver	Bronze	Total
Athletics	39	36	31	106
Powerlifting	15	10	11	36
Sitting Volleyball	8	2	0	10
Shooting	6	0	2	8
Archery	4	4	3	11
Judo	2	2	1	5
Taekwondo	1	2	2	5
Football 7-a-side	0	1	2	3
Football 5-a-side	0	1	0	1
Total	75	58	52	185

=== Medals by Winter Sport ===
Sport	Gold	Silver	Bronze	Total
Total	0	0	0	0

== Sport by year ==
=== Summer Paralympics ===
Sport	88	92	96	00	04	08	12	16	20	Years
Archery				3	3		6	7	6	5
Athletics	16	14	7	12	28	14	16	26	16	9
Cycling					1		1	1	1	4
Football 5-a-side							10	10		2
Football 7-a-side					11	11	12	12		4
Goalball	6					6	4			3
Judo					4	5	6	3	2	5
Paracanoeing								1	2	2
Powerlifting	1		6	7	8	7	8	6	5	8
Shooting			5	6	9	3	2	6	3	7
Sitting volleyball	12	11	12	12	10	12	11	24	12	9
Swimming							1	1		2
Table tennis		4			3	2	1			4
Taekwondo									3	1
Wheelchair basketball					12	12		12	12	4
Wheelchair tennis							1			1
Total	35	29	30	40	89	72	79	110	62	9

=== Winter Paralympics ===
Sport	98	02	06	10	14	18	Years
Alpine skiing	2	1	1	1	1	0	5
Cross-country skiing	0	0	0	0	0	2	1
Snowboarding	0	0	0	0	0	3	1
Total	2	1	1	1	1	5	6

== Medalists ==
=== 1988 ===
Medal	Name	Sport	Event
Gold	Mokhtar Nourafshan	Athletics	Men's discus throw 3
Gold	Hadi Yarahmadi	Athletics	Men's javelin throw 4
Gold	Javad Abdollahzadeh	Athletics	Men's javelin throw 5
Gold	Ali Kashfia; Mohammad Hossein Parastar; Kazem Esmaeilian; Mohammad Ali Tabatabaei; Mohammad Mostafavi; Ahmad Shivani; Mohsen Barati; Hadi Rezaei; Reza Gozali; Hossein Hashemi; Saeid Hanifi; Reza Bodaghi	Volleyball	Men's sitting
Silver	Ahmad Rezaei	Athletics	Men's javelin throw L5
Bronze	Ali Asghar Hadizadeh	Athletics	Men's shot put L5
Bronze	Reza Chavoshi	Athletics	Men's discus throw 3
Bronze	Hassan Samavati	Athletics	Men's discus throw A1–3/A9/L3

=== 1992 ===
Medal	Name	Sport	Event
Gold	Gholam Akhavan; Ahmad Shivani; Hadi Rezaei; Parviz Firouzi; Hassan Hashemi; Ali Akbar Salavatian; Hassan Mohammadi; Ali Golkar; Majid Soleimani; Ali Kashfia; Hassan Zendehgard	Volleyball	Men's sitting
Silver	Hossein Agha-Barghchi	Athletics	Men's shot put C6
Silver	Avaz Azmoudeh	Athletics	Men's javelin throw THW4
Bronze	Hossein Agha-Barghchi	Athletics	Men's discus throw C7

=== 1996 ===
Medal	Name	Sport	Event
Gold	Ghader Modabber	Athletics	Men's shot put F51
Gold	Hossein Agha-Barghchi	Athletics	Men's discus throw F35
Gold	Ghader Modabber	Athletics	Men's discus throw F51
Gold	Abdolreza Jokar	Athletics	Men's discus throw F52
Gold	Ghader Modabber	Athletics	Men's javelin throw F51
Gold	Mokhtar Nourafshan	Athletics	Men's javelin throw F53
Gold	Mohammad Reza Mirzaei	Athletics	Men's javelin throw F56
Gold	Enayatollah Bokharaei	Shooting	Mixed 10 m air rifle prone SH1
Gold	Gholam Akhavan; Farshid Ashouri; Mohsen Barati; Jalil Imeri; Ali Golkar; Parviz Firouzi; Ali Kashfia; Hadi Rezaei; Ali Akbar Salavatian; Hassan Shahi; Ahmad Shivani; Majid Soleimani	Volleyball	Men's sitting
Silver	Mokhtar Nourafshan	Athletics	Men's shot put F53
Silver	Mohammad Sadeghi Mehryar	Athletics	Men's shot put F55
Silver	Mokhtar Nourafshan	Athletics	Men's discus throw F53
Silver	Mohammad Sadeghi Mehryar	Athletics	Men's discus throw F55
Silver	Fereydoun Karimipour	Powerlifting	Men's 56 kg
Bronze	Abdolreza Jokar	Athletics	Men's javelin throw F52
Bronze	Allahbakhsh Akbari	Powerlifting	Men's 60 kg
Bronze	Zeinal Siavoshani	Powerlifting	Men's 67.5 kg

=== 2000 ===
Medal	Name	Sport	Event
Gold	Ghader Modabber	Athletics	Men's shot put F52
Gold	Mokhtar Nourafshan	Athletics	Men's shot put F54
Gold	Ghader Modabber	Athletics	Men's discus throw F52
Gold	Abdolreza Jokar	Athletics	Men's discus throw F53
Gold	Mokhtar Nourafshan	Athletics	Men's discus throw F54
Gold	Mohammad Sadeghi Mehryar	Athletics	Men's discus throw F56
Gold	Aref Khosravinia	Athletics	Men's discus throw F57
Gold	Avaz Azmoudeh	Athletics	Men's javelin throw F54
Gold	Mohammad Reza Mirzaei	Athletics	Men's javelin throw F57
Gold	Amrollah Dehghani	Powerlifting	Men's 100 kg
Gold	Enayatollah Bokharaei	Shooting	Mixed 10 m air rifle prone SH1
Gold	Ali Eshghi; Hojjat Behravan; Ali Akbar Salavatian; Parviz Firouzi; Issa Zirahi; Jalil Imeri; Farshid Ashouri; Ali Golkar; Majid Soleimani; Ali Kashfia; Reza Peidayesh; Mohammad Reza Rahimi	Volleyball	Men's sitting
Silver	Dariush Namvar	Athletics	Men's discus throw F56
Silver	Fereydoun Karimipour	Powerlifting	Men's 56 kg
Silver	Mansour Dimasi	Powerlifting	Men's 75 kg
Silver	Saeid Bafandeh	Powerlifting	Men's 82.5 kg
Bronze	Abbas Mohseni	Athletics	Men's shot put F37
Bronze	Hossein Agha-Barghchi	Athletics	Men's discus throw F36
Bronze	Vahab Saalabi	Athletics	Men's javelin throw F42
Bronze	Ghader Modabber	Athletics	Men's javelin throw F52
Bronze	Abdolreza Jokar	Athletics	Men's javelin throw F53
Bronze	Allahbakhsh Akbari	Powerlifting	Men's 67.5 kg
Bronze	Nayyereh Akef	Shooting	Women's 10 m air pistol SH1

=== 2004 ===
Medal	Name	Sport	Event
Gold	Siamak Saleh-Farajzadeh	Athletics	Men's discus throw F33/34
Gold	Mohammad Sadeghi Mehryar	Athletics	Men's discus throw F56
Gold	Ali Naderi	Athletics	Men's javelin throw F55/56
Gold	Mohammad Reza Mirzaei	Athletics	Men's javelin throw F57
Gold	Morteza Dashti	Powerlifting	Men's 48 kg
Gold	Kazem Rajabi	Powerlifting	Men's 100 kg
~~Gold~~	~~Habibollah Mousavi~~	~~Powerlifting~~	~~Men's +100 kg~~
Silver	Javad Hardani	Athletics	Men's discus throw F38
Silver	Jalil Bagheri Jeddi	Athletics	Men's discus throw F55
Silver	Davoud Alipourian; Sadegh Bigdeli; Saeid Ebrahimi; Jalil Imeri; Ali Golkar; Mehdi Hamidzadeh; Nasser Hassanpour; Mohammad Reza Rahimi; Ramezan Salehi; Issa Zirahi	Volleyball	Men's sitting
Bronze	Mohsen Amoo-Aghaei	Athletics	Men's shot put F33/34
Bronze	Asghar Zareeinejad	Athletics	Men's shot put F40
Bronze	Mehrdad Karamzadeh	Athletics	Men's shot put F42
Bronze	Mokhtar Nourafshan	Athletics	Men's discus throw F55
Bronze	Alireza Kamalifar	Athletics	Men's discus throw F58
Bronze	Vahab Saalabi	Athletics	Men's javelin throw F42
Bronze	Avaz Azmoudeh	Athletics	Men's javelin throw F54
Bronze	Abdolreza Jokar	Athletics	Men's javelin throw F52/53
Bronze	Azam Khodayari	Athletics	Women's discus throw F56–58
Bronze	Hani Asakereh	Judo	Men's 73 kg
Bronze	Gholam Hossein Chaltoukkar	Powerlifting	Men's 52 kg
Bronze	Hamzeh Mohammadi	Powerlifting	Men's 67.5 kg
Bronze	Reza Boroumand	Powerlifting	Men's 75 kg

=== 2008 ===
Medal	Name	Sport	Event
Gold	Javad Hardani	Athletics	Men's discus throw F37/38
Gold	Mohammad Reza Mirzaei	Athletics	Men's javelin throw F57/58
Gold	Hamzeh Mohammadi	Powerlifting	Men's 60 kg
Gold	Kazem Rajabi	Powerlifting	Men's +100 kg
Gold	Mohammad Hosseinifar; Mohammad Reza Rahimi; Reza Peidayesh; Davoud Alipourian; Mehdi Hamidzadeh; Nasser Hassanpour; Sadegh Bigdeli; Jalil Imeri; Saeid Ebrahimi; Issa Zirahi; Ramezan Salehi; Mohammad Khaleghi	Sitting volleyball	Men
Silver	Mehrdad Karamzadeh	Athletics	Men's discus throw F42
Silver	Ali Mohammadyari	Athletics	Men's discus throw F55/56
Silver	Abdolreza Jokar	Athletics	Men's javelin throw F53/54
Silver	Saeid Rahmati	Judo	Men's 60 kg
Silver	Ali Hosseini	Powerlifting	Men's 67.5 kg
Silver	Majid Farzin	Powerlifting	Men's 75 kg
Bronze	Javad Hardani	Athletics	Men's javelin throw F37/38
Bronze	Habibollah Heidarimehr; Esmaeil Malekzadeh; Gholamreza Najafi; Hadi Safari; Bahman Ansari; Ehsan Gholamhosseinpour; Morteza Heidari; Abdolreza Karimzadeh; Rasoul Atashafrouz; Moslem Akbari; Ardeshir Mahini	Football 7-a-side	Men
Bronze	Ali Sadeghzadeh	Powerlifting	Men's 100 kg

=== 2012 ===
Medal	Name	Sport	Event	Date
Gold	Zahra Nemati	Archery	Women's individual recurve W1/W2	4 September
Gold	Peyman Nasiri	Athletics	Men's 1500 m T20	4 September
Gold	Jalil Bagheri Jeddi	Athletics	Men's shot put F54/55/56	1 September
Gold	Javad Hardani	Athletics	Men's discus throw F37/38	7 September
Gold	Mohsen Kaedi	Athletics	Men's javelin throw F33/34	1 September
Gold	Mohammad Khalvandi	Athletics	Men's javelin throw F57/58	8 September
Gold	Nader Moradi	Powerlifting	Men's 60 kg	1 September
Gold	Ali Hosseini	Powerlifting	Men's 75 kg	3 September
Gold	Majid Farzin	Powerlifting	Men's 82.5 kg	4 September
Gold	Siamand Rahman	Powerlifting	Men's +100 kg	5 September
Silver	Mohsen Kaedi	Athletics	Men's shot put F34	4 September
Silver	Mehrdad Karam Zadeh	Athletics	Men's discus throw F42	2 September
Silver	Sajad Nikparast	Athletics	Men's javelin throw F12/13	5 September
Silver	Kamran Shokrisalari	Athletics	Men's javelin throw F42	7 September
Silver	Abdolreza Jokar	Athletics	Men's javelin throw F52/53	4 September
Silver	Rouhollah Rostami	Powerlifting	Men's 67.5 kg	2 September
Silver	Volleyball team: Majid Lashgari; Reza Peidayesh; Davood Alipourian; Ahmad Eiri; Naser Hassanpour; Sadegh Bigdeli; Jalil Eimery (captain); Seyed Saeid Ebrahimi; Isa Zirahi; Ramezan Salehi; Mohammad Khaleghi	Volleyball	Men's volleyball	8 September
Bronze	Razieh Shir Mohammadi; Zahra Javanmard; Zahra Nemati	Archery	Women's team recurve open	5 September
Bronze	Javad Hardani	Athletics	Men's shot put F37/38	5 September
Bronze	Ali Mohammadyari	Athletics	Men's discus throw F54/55/56	5 September
Bronze	Farzad Sepahvand	Athletics	Men's discus throw F44	6 September
Bronze	Football 7-a-side team: Mehran Nikoee Majd; Moslem Khazaeipirsarabi; Ehsan Gholamhosseinpour; Morteza Heidari; Bahman Ansari; Hashem Rastegarimobin; Sadegh Hassani Baghi; Farzad Mehri; Jasem Bakhshi; Moslem Akbari (captain); Rasoul Atashafrouz; Abdolreza Karimizadeh	Football 7-a-side	Football 7-a-side	9 September
Bronze	Ali Sadeghzadeh	Powerlifting	Men's 100 kg	5 September
Bronze	Sareh Javanmardi	Shooting	Women's 10 m air pistol SH1	31 August

=== 2016 ===
Medal	Name	Sport	Event	Date
Gold	Gholamreza Rahimi	Archery	Men's individual recurve open	13 September
Gold	Zahra Nemati	Archery	Women's Individual recurve open	15 September
Gold	Mohammad Khalvandi	Athletics	Men's Javelin Throw–F57	12 September
Gold	Majid Farzin	Powerlifting	Men's 80 kg	12 September
Gold	Siamand Rahman	Powerlifting	Men's +107 kg	14 September
Gold	Sareh Javanmardi	Shooting	Women's 10m air pistol SH1	9 September
Gold	Sareh Javanmardi	Shooting	Mixed 50m pistol SH1	14 September
Gold	Sitting Volleyball team: Mehrzad Mehravan; Morteza Mehrzadselakjani; Majid Lashkarisanami; Davoud Alipourian (c); Abolfazl Oliyaei; Ramezan Salehihajikolaei; Sadegh Bigdeli; Meisam Ali Pour; Hossein Golestani; Isa Zirahi; Arash Khormali; Mahdi Babadi	Sitting volleyball	Sitting volleyball	18 September
Silver	Zahra Nemati; Ebrahim Ranjbar	Archery	Team recurve open	11 September
Silver	Saman Pakbaz	Athletics	Men's Shot Put – F12	8 September
Silver	Alireza Ghaleh Naseri	Athletics	Men's Discus Throw – F56	10 September
Silver	Sajad Mohammadian	Athletics	Men's Shot Put – F42	12 September
Silver	Abdollah Heydari	Athletics	Men's Javelin Throw – F57	12 September
Silver	Sajad Nikparast	Athletics	Men's Javelin Throw – F13	14 September
Silver	Hamed Amiri	Athletics	Men's Shot Put – F55	16 September
Silver	Football 5-a-side team: Meysam Shojaeiyan; Behzad Zadaliasghari; Mohammadreza Mehninasab; Hossein Rajabpour (c); Ahmadreza Shahhosseini; Sadegh Rahimighasr; Amir Pourrazavi; Mohammad Heidari; Rasool Baseri; Akbar Shoushtari	Football 5-a-side	Football 5-a-side	17 September
Silver	Football 7-a-side team: Moslem Khazaei Pirsarabi; Hashem Rastegarimobin (c); Lotfollah Jangjou; Rasoul Atashafrouz; Sadegh Hassani Baghi; Mohammad Kharat; Behnam Sohrabi; Hossein Tiz Bor; Mehdi Jamali; Jasem Bakhshi; Hassan Safari; Farzad Mehri; Moslem Akbari; Babak Safari	Football 7-a-side	Football 7-a-side	16 September
Bronze	Ebrahim Ranjbar	Archery	Men's individual recurve open	13 September
Bronze	Peyman Nasiri Bazanjani	Athletics	Men's 1500m T20	13 September
Bronze	Asadollah Azimi	Athletics	Men's Shot Put – F53	14 September
Bronze	Javad Hardani	Athletics	Men's Javelin Throw – F38	15 September
Bronze	Mohsen Kaedi	Athletics	Men's Javelin Throw – F34	15 September
Bronze	Javid Ehsani Shakib	Athletics	Men's Shot Put – F57	17 September
Bronze	Ali Sadeghzadeh	Powerlifting	Men's –107 kg	14 September

=== 2020 ===
Medal	Name	Sport	Event	Date
Gold	Rouhollah Rostami	Powerlifting	Men's 80 kg	28 August
Gold	Vahid Nouri	Judo	Men's 90 kg	29 August
Gold	Mohammadreza Kheirollahzadeh	Judo	Men's +100 kg	29 August
Gold	Amir Khosravani	Athletics	Men's long jump T12	30 August
Gold	Mahdi Olad	Athletics	Men's shot put F11	30 August
Gold	Hashemiyeh Motaghian	Athletics	Women's javelin throw F56	31 August
Gold	Sareh Javanmardi	Shooting	Women's 10 metre air pistol SH1	31 August
Gold	Saeid Afrooz	Athletics	Men's javelin throw F34	1 September
Gold	Hamed Amiri	Athletics	Men's javelin throw F54	3 September
Gold	Iran men's national sitting volleyball team: Mehrzad Mehravan; Morteza Mehrzadselakjani; Meisam Ali Pour; Davoud Alipourian; Morteza Ramezani Gerakoei; Seyed Mohammed Hossein Hosseini Jed; Sadegh Bigdeli; Majid Lashkarisanami; Hossein Golestani; Mohammed Nemati; Ramezan Salehihajikolaei; Mahdi Babadi	Sitting volleyball	Men's tournament	4 September
Silver	Amir Jafari	Powerlifting	Men's 65 kg	27 August
Silver	Amanolah Papi	Athletics	Men's javelin throw F57	28 August
Silver	Alireza Mokhtari	Athletics	Men's shot put F53	29 August
Silver	Hamed Solhipour	Powerlifting	Men's 97 kg	29 August
Silver	Mansour Pourmirzaei	Powerlifting	Men's +107 kg	30 August
Silver	Ramezan Biabani	Archery	Men's individual compound open	31 August
Silver	Sadegh Beit Sayah	Athletics	Men's javelin throw F41	4 September
Silver	Sajad Mohammadian	Athletics	Men's shot put F643	4 September
Bronze	Saman Razi	Powerlifting	Men's 107 kg	30 August

=== 2024 ===
Medal	Name	Sport	Event	Date
Gold	Sareh Javanmardi	Shooting	P2 – Women's 10 metre air pistol SH1	31 August
Gold	Amirhossein Alipour Darbeid	Athletics	Men's Shot put F11	2 September
Gold	Saeid Afrooz	Athletics	Men's Javelin throw F34	4 September
Gold	Rouhollah Rostami	Powerlifting	Men's 80kg	6 September
Gold	Iran men's national sitting volleyball team: Hossein Golestani; Hamidreza Abbasifeshki; Davoud Alipourian; Ramezan Salehi; Sadegh Bigdeli; Meysam Hajibabaei Movahhed; Meisam Ali Pour; Isa Zirahi; Majid Lashkarisanami; Mohammed Nemati; Morteza Mehrzad; Mahdi Babadi	Sitting volleyball	Men's tournament	6 September
Gold	Yasin Khosravi	Athletics	Men's Shot put F57	6 September
Gold	Aliakbar Gharibshahi	Powerlifting	Men's 107kg	8 September
Gold	Ahmad Aminzadeh	Powerlifting	Men's +107kg	8 September
Silver	Zahra Rahimi	Taekwondo	Women's 52 kg	29 August
Silver	Parastoo Habibi	Athletics	Women's Club throw F32	30 August
Silver	Zafar Zaker	Athletics	Men's Shot put F55	30 August
Silver	Fatemeh Hemmati	Archery	Women's individual compound open	31 August
Silver	Fatemeh Hemmati; Hadi Nori	Archery	Team compound	2 September
Silver	Mahdi Olad	Athletics	Men's Shot put F11	2 September
Silver	Hajar Safarzadeh	Athletics	Women's 400 m T12	3 September
Silver	Hassan Bajoulvand	Athletics	Men's Discus Throw F11	5 September
Silver	Meysam Banitaba	Judo	Men's -60 kg J1	5 September
Silver	Ali Pirouj	Athletics	Men's Javelin throw F13	5 September
Bronze	Alireza Bakht	Taekwondo	Men's 80 kg	31 August
Bronze	Hamed Haghshenas	Taekwondo	Men's +80 kg	31 August
Bronze	Alireza Mokhtari	Athletics	Men's Shot put F53	1 September
Bronze	Mohammad Reza Arab Ameri	Archery	Men's Individual recurve	4 September
Bronze	Mohsen Bakhtiar	Powerlifting	Men's 59kg	5 September
Bronze	Aliasghar Javanmardi	Athletics	Men's Shot put F35	5 September
Bronze	Elham Salehi	Athletics	Javelin throw F54	7 September

== Multi medallists ==
This is a list of multiple gold medalists for Iran, listing people who have won three or more gold medals.

Athlete	Sport	Paralympics	Gold	Silver	Bronze	Total
Ghader Modabber	Athletics	1996–2000	5	0	1	6
Mokhtar Nourafshan	Athletics	1988–2004	4	2	1	7
Sareh Javanmardi	Shooting	2012–2024	4	0	1	5
Ali Kashfia	Sitting volleyball	1988–2000	4	0	0	4
Mohammad Reza Mirzaei	Athletics	1996–2008	4	0	0	4
Jalil Imeri	Sitting volleyball	1996–2012	3	2	0	5
Issa Zirahi	Sitting volleyball	2000–2016	3	2	0	5
Zahra Nemati	Archery	2012–2020	3	1	1	5
Ali Golkar	Sitting volleyball	1992–2004	3	1	0	4
Parviz Firouzi	Sitting volleyball	1992–2000	3	0	0	3
Hadi Rezaei	Sitting volleyball	1988–1996	3	0	0	3
Ali Akbar Salavatian	Sitting volleyball	1992–2000	3	0	0	3
Ahmad Shivani	Sitting volleyball	1988–1996	3	0	0	3
Majid Soleimani	Sitting volleyball	1992–2000	3	0	0	3

== See also ==
- Iran at the Summer Olympics
- Iran men's national sitting volleyball team
