= Iran at the 2004 Summer Paralympics =

- IPC code: IRI
- NPC: I.R. Iran National Paralympic Committee
- Website: www.paralympic.ir

in Athens
- Competitors: 89 in 10 sports
- Flag bearer: Enayatollah Bokharaei
- Medals Ranked 23rd: Gold 6 Silver 3 Bronze 13 Total 22

Summer Paralympics appearances (overview)
- 1988; 1992; 1996; 2000; 2004; 2008; 2012; 2016; 2020; 2024

Athletes from the Islamic Republic of Iran competed at the 2004 Summer Paralympics in Athens, Greece.

== Competitors ==
Sport	Men	Women	Total
Archery	3		3
Athletics	25	3	28
Cycling	1		1
Football 7-a-side	11		11
Judo	4		4
Powerlifting	8		8
Shooting	6	3	9
Table tennis	3		3
Volleyball	10		10
Wheelchair basketball	12		12
Total	83	6	89

== Medal summary ==
=== Medal table ===
Sport	Gold	Silver	Bronze	Total
Athletics	4	2	9	15
Judo			1	1
Powerlifting	3		3	6
Volleyball		1		1
Total	7	3	13	23

=== Medalists ===
Medal	Name	Sport	Event
Gold	Siamak Saleh-Farajzadeh	Athletics	Men's discus throw F33/34
Gold	Mohammad Sadeghi Mehryar	Athletics	Men's discus throw F56
Gold	Ali Naderi	Athletics	Men's javelin throw F55/56
Gold	Mohammad Reza Mirzaei	Athletics	Men's javelin throw F57
Gold	Morteza Dashti	Powerlifting	Men's 48 kg
Gold	Kazem Rajabi	Powerlifting	Men's 100 kg
Gold	Habibollah Mousavi	Powerlifting	Men's +100 kg
Silver	Javad Hardani	Athletics	Men's discus throw F38
Silver	Jalil Bagheri Jeddi	Athletics	Men's discus throw F55
Silver	Davoud Alipourian; Sadegh Bigdeli; Saeid Ebrahimi; Jalil Imeri; Ali Golkar; Mehdi Hamidzadeh; Nasser Hassanpour; Mohammad Reza Rahimi; Ramezan Salehi; Issa Zirahi	Volleyball	Men's sitting
Bronze	Mohsen Amoo-Aghaei	Athletics	Men's shot put F33/34
Bronze	Asghar Zareeinejad	Athletics	Men's shot put F40
Bronze	Mehrdad Karamzadeh	Athletics	Men's shot put F42
Bronze	Mokhtar Nourafshan	Athletics	Men's discus throw F55
Bronze	Alireza Kamalifar	Athletics	Men's discus throw F58
Bronze	Vahab Saalabi	Athletics	Men's javelin throw F42
Bronze	Avaz Azmoudeh	Athletics	Men's javelin throw F54
Bronze	Abdolreza Jokar	Athletics	Men's javelin throw F52/53
Bronze	Azam Khodayari	Athletics	Women's discus throw F56–58
Bronze	Hani Asakereh	Judo	Men's 73 kg
Bronze	Gholam Hossein Chaltoukkar	Powerlifting	Men's 52 kg
Bronze	Hamzeh Mohammadi	Powerlifting	Men's 67.5 kg
Bronze	Reza Boroumand	Powerlifting	Men's 75 kg

== Results by event ==
=== Archery ===
Men's recurve

Athlete	Event	Ranking round		1/16 eliminations	1/8 eliminations	Quarterfinal	Semifinal	Final	Rank
Athlete	Event	Score	Rank	1/16 eliminations	1/8 eliminations	Quarterfinal	Semifinal	Final	Rank
Ghasem Javani	Individual standing	532	20 Q	Wickramasinghe (SRI); L 127–140	Did not advance				21
Heshmatollah Kazemi	Individual standing	575	15 Q	Lazo (SVK); W 137–127	Onodera (JPN); W 142–141	An (KOR); L 76–102	Did not advance		8
Majid Kehtari	Individual W2	572	21 Q	Gregory (GBR); L 135–141	Did not advance				27
Ghasem Javani; Heshmatollah Kazemi; Majid Kehtari	Team open	1679	12 Q		Poland; L 210–221	Did not advance			10

=== Athletics ===
Men

Athlete	Event	Result	Score	Rank
Yaghoub Pagheh	Triple jump F46	13.46		5
Mohsen Amoo-Aghaei	Shot put F33/34	9.30	969	Bronze medal
Siamak Saleh-Farajzadeh	Shot put F33/34	8.76	829	9
Siamak Saleh-Farajzadeh	Discus throw F33/34	39.12 WR	995	Gold medal
Abbas Mohsenizadeh	Shot put F37	12.59		4
Javad Hardani	Shot put F38	12.12		4
Javad Hardani	Discus throw F38	43.27		Silver medal
Asghar Zareeinejad	Shot put F40	9.52		Bronze medal
Mehrdad Karamzadeh	Shot put F42	12.90		Bronze medal
Farhad Raiga	Shot put F42	12.37		5
Javad Mousavi	Shot put F44/46	13.52	930	6
Alireza Yamousa	Shot put F53	6.83		7
Jalil Bagheri Jeddi	Shot put F56	10.35		7
Jalil Bagheri Jeddi	Discus throw F55	34.64		Silver medal
Mohammad Hossein Firouzi	Discus throw F53	17.33		8
Abdolreza Jokar	Discus throw F53	19.13		5
Abdolreza Jokar	Javelin throw F52/53	19.77	1032	Bronze medal
Asadollah Azimi	Discus throw F54	24.15		5
Ali Naderi	Discus throw F55	27.62		9
Ali Naderi	Javelin throw F55/56	35.30 WR	1208	Gold medal
Mokhtar Nourafshan	Discus throw F55	31.45		Bronze medal
Mokhtar Nourafshan	Javelin throw F55/56	Did not start		
Mohammad Dabbaghzadeh	Discus throw F56	34.99		4
Mohammad Sadeghi Mehryar	Discus throw F56	37.52 WR		Gold medal
Alireza Kamalifar	Discus throw F58	52.35		Bronze medal
Kazem Moradi	Javelin throw F11	33.33		8
Erfan Hosseini	Javelin throw F12	50.76		4
Vahab Saalabi	Javelin throw F42	46.91		Bronze medal
Avaz Azmoudeh	Javelin throw F54	26.16		Bronze medal
Hassan Houshyar	Javelin throw F55/56	27.67	947	7
Mohammad Reza Mirzaei	Javelin throw F57	40.71 PR		Gold medal

Women

Athlete	Event	Result	Score	Rank
Fatemeh Montazeri	Shot put F56–58	8.36	913	4
Fatemeh Montazeri	Discus throw F56–58	No mark		
Azam Khodayari	Discus throw F56–58	24.86	1050	Bronze medal
Zahra Taghibeigloo	Javelin throw F56–58	24.02	961	5

=== Cycling ===
Men's road

Athlete	Event	Score	Rank
Mahmoud Meili	Bicycle road race / time trial LC 3	26	13

Men's track

Athlete	Event	Real time	Result	Rank
Mahmoud Meili	Bicycle 1 km time trial LC1–4	1:33.726	1:21.509	33

=== Football 7-a-side ===
Men

Squad list	Preliminaries		Semifinal	Final	Rank
Squad list	Pool A	Rank	Semifinal	Final	Rank
Nasser Hosseinifar; Houshang Khosravani; Gholamreza Najafi; Hadi Safari; Javad Mansour-Fallah; Naghi Kamani; Morteza Heidari; Abdolreza Karimzadeh; Majid Mashhadi; Ardeshir Mahini; Mohammad Reza Khedri; Coach: Alireza Raadi	Argentina; D 2–2	3	Did not advance	5th place match Netherlands; W 3–0	5
Nasser Hosseinifar; Houshang Khosravani; Gholamreza Najafi; Hadi Safari; Javad Mansour-Fallah; Naghi Kamani; Morteza Heidari; Abdolreza Karimzadeh; Majid Mashhadi; Ardeshir Mahini; Mohammad Reza Khedri; Coach: Alireza Raadi	Ukraine; L 2–6	3	Did not advance	5th place match Netherlands; W 3–0	5
Nasser Hosseinifar; Houshang Khosravani; Gholamreza Najafi; Hadi Safari; Javad Mansour-Fallah; Naghi Kamani; Morteza Heidari; Abdolreza Karimzadeh; Majid Mashhadi; Ardeshir Mahini; Mohammad Reza Khedri; Coach: Alireza Raadi	Ireland; W 7–2	3	Did not advance	5th place match Netherlands; W 3–0	5

=== Judo ===
Men

Athlete	Event	Round of 16	Quarterfinal	Semifinal	Repechage final	Final	Rank
Saeid Rahmati	60 kg	Tsang (HKG); W 1021–0000	Díaz (ARG); W 0210–0000	Hirose (JPN); L 0000–1000		3rd place match Biro (HUN); L 0011–0012	5
Hani Asakereh	73 kg	Ramírez (ARG); W 1001–0010	Moore (USA); L 0000–0001	Bye	Repechage; Atnabayev (RUS); W 1000–0000	3rd place match Krieger (GER); W 0210–0000	Bronze medal
Amir Mirhassan Nattaj	90 kg	Miyauchi (JPN); L 0022–0200	Did not advance				11
Reza Arshad	100 kg	Men (CHN); L 0001–0110	Did not advance	Moreno (ESP); W 1000–0000	Shneyderman (RUS); L 0001–0201	Did not advance	7

=== Powerlifting ===
Men

Athlete	Event	Result	Rank
Morteza Dashti	48 kg	167.5	Gold medal
Gholam Hossein Chaltoukkar	52 kg	165.0	Bronze medal
Ali Hosseini	60 kg	~~192.5~~	DSQ
Hamzeh Mohammadi	67.5 kg	200.0	Bronze medal
Reza Boroumand	75 kg	195.0	Bronze medal
Saeid Bafandeh	82.5 kg	No mark	
Kazem Rajabi	100 kg	242.5 WR	Gold medal
Habibollah Mousavi	+100 kg	~~250.0~~ WR	DSQ

=== Shooting ===
Men

Athlete	Event	Qualification		Final		
Athlete	Event	Score	Rank	Score	Total	Rank
Jamal Asadi	10 m air pistol SH1	554	14	Did not advance		
Ramezan Salehnejad	10 m air rifle standing SH1	583	10	Did not advance		

Women

Athlete	Event	Qualification		Final		
Athlete	Event	Score	Rank	Score	Total	Rank
Nayyereh Akef	10 m air pistol SH1	362	6 Q	81.8	443.8	8
Sedigheh Barmaki	10 m air rifle standing SH1	387	4 Q	99.9	486.9	5
Mahnaz Marzabadi	10 m air rifle standing SH1	374	15	Did not advance		

Mixed

Athlete	Event	Qualification		Final		
Athlete	Event	Score	Rank	Score	Total	Rank
Nayyereh Akef	50 m free pistol SH1	506	19	Did not advance		
Jamal Asadi	50 m free pistol SH1	521	9	Did not advance		
Hassan Akbari	10 m air rifle prone SH1	597	14	Did not advance		
Hassan Akbari	50 m free rifle prone SH1	581	15	Did not advance		
Enayatollah Bokharaei	10 m air rifle prone SH1	596	22	Did not advance		
Enayatollah Bokharaei	50 m free rifle prone SH1	581	15	Did not advance		
Akbar Alipour	10 m air rifle prone SH2	597	12	Did not advance		
Ayatollah Heidari	10 m air rifle prone SH2	597	12	Did not advance		

=== Table tennis ===
Men

Athlete	Event	Preliminaries		Round of 16	Quarterfinal	Semifinal	Final	Rank
Athlete	Event	Groups	Rank	Round of 16	Quarterfinal	Semifinal	Final	Rank
Aghil Alimardani	Singles 2	Hajek (AUT); L 1–3	Group A 4		Did not advance			14
Aghil Alimardani	Singles 2	Kurkinen (FIN); L 0–3	Group A 4		Did not advance			14
Aghil Alimardani	Singles 2	Boury (FRA); L 0–3	Group A 4		Did not advance			14
Abbas Alimardani	Singles 9	Cieslar (CZE); L 0–3	Group E 3	Did not advance				13
Abbas Alimardani	Singles 9	Gubica (CRO); W 3–1	Group E 3	Did not advance				13
Abbas Alimardani	Singles 9	Last (NED); L 0–3	Group E 3	Did not advance				13
Behnam Rahbari	Singles 9	Leibovitz (USA); L 0–3	Group D 3	Did not advance				14
Behnam Rahbari	Singles 9	Rakić (CRO); W 3–2	Group D 3	Did not advance				14
Behnam Rahbari	Singles 9	Tomioka (JPN); L 0–3	Group D 3	Did not advance				14
Abbas Alimardani; Behnam Rahbari	Team 9	Chinese Taipei; L 0–3	Group B 4			Did not advance		7
Abbas Alimardani; Behnam Rahbari	Team 9	Croatia; L 1–3	Group B 4			Did not advance		7
Abbas Alimardani; Behnam Rahbari	Team 9	Netherlands; L 1–3	Group B 4			Did not advance		7

=== Volleyball ===
Men's sitting

Squad list	Preliminaries		Quarterfinal	Semifinal	Final	Rank
Squad list	Pool A	Rank	Quarterfinal	Semifinal	Final	Rank
Davoud Alipourian; Sadegh Bigdeli; Saeid Ebrahimi; Jalil Imeri; Ali Golkar; Mehdi Hamidzadeh; Nasser Hassanpour; Mohammad Reza Rahimi; Ramezan Salehi; Issa Zirahi; Coach: Hadi Rezaei	Japan; W 3–0; 25–6, 25–13, 25–10	1 Q	Greece; W 3–0; 25–10, 25–7, 25–11	Egypt; W 3–0; 25–18, 25–19, 25–22	Bosnia and Herzegovina; L 2–3; 23–25, 25–20, 25–20, 25–27, 10–15	Silver medal
Davoud Alipourian; Sadegh Bigdeli; Saeid Ebrahimi; Jalil Imeri; Ali Golkar; Mehdi Hamidzadeh; Nasser Hassanpour; Mohammad Reza Rahimi; Ramezan Salehi; Issa Zirahi; Coach: Hadi Rezaei	Germany; W 3–0; 25–20, 25–23, 25–18	1 Q	Greece; W 3–0; 25–10, 25–7, 25–11	Egypt; W 3–0; 25–18, 25–19, 25–22	Bosnia and Herzegovina; L 2–3; 23–25, 25–20, 25–20, 25–27, 10–15	Silver medal
Davoud Alipourian; Sadegh Bigdeli; Saeid Ebrahimi; Jalil Imeri; Ali Golkar; Mehdi Hamidzadeh; Nasser Hassanpour; Mohammad Reza Rahimi; Ramezan Salehi; Issa Zirahi; Coach: Hadi Rezaei	Finland; W 3–0; 25–12, 25–17, 25–17	1 Q	Greece; W 3–0; 25–10, 25–7, 25–11	Egypt; W 3–0; 25–18, 25–19, 25–22	Bosnia and Herzegovina; L 2–3; 23–25, 25–20, 25–20, 25–27, 10–15	Silver medal

=== Wheelchair basketball ===
Men

Squad list	Preliminaries		Quarterfinal	Semifinal	Final	Rank
Squad list	Group B	Rank	Quarterfinal	Semifinal	Final	Rank
Majid Mokhtari; Ahmad Daghaghelehpour; Alireza Ahmadi; Morteza Gharibloo; Adel Torfi; Zakaria Hesamizadeh; Ebrahim Taghiloo; Alireza Danesh; Mohammad Reza Karimi; Gholamreza Nami; Bahman Seifi; Abolfazl Mousavi; Coach: Abdolghafour Kamrava	Netherlands; L 51–83	5	Did not advance		9th place match Brazil; W 67–63	9
Majid Mokhtari; Ahmad Daghaghelehpour; Alireza Ahmadi; Morteza Gharibloo; Adel Torfi; Zakaria Hesamizadeh; Ebrahim Taghiloo; Alireza Danesh; Mohammad Reza Karimi; Gholamreza Nami; Bahman Seifi; Abolfazl Mousavi; Coach: Abdolghafour Kamrava	Germany; L 53–67	5	Did not advance		9th place match Brazil; W 67–63	9
Majid Mokhtari; Ahmad Daghaghelehpour; Alireza Ahmadi; Morteza Gharibloo; Adel Torfi; Zakaria Hesamizadeh; Ebrahim Taghiloo; Alireza Danesh; Mohammad Reza Karimi; Gholamreza Nami; Bahman Seifi; Abolfazl Mousavi; Coach: Abdolghafour Kamrava	Japan; L 57–79	5	Did not advance		9th place match Brazil; W 67–63	9
Majid Mokhtari; Ahmad Daghaghelehpour; Alireza Ahmadi; Morteza Gharibloo; Adel Torfi; Zakaria Hesamizadeh; Ebrahim Taghiloo; Alireza Danesh; Mohammad Reza Karimi; Gholamreza Nami; Bahman Seifi; Abolfazl Mousavi; Coach: Abdolghafour Kamrava	Greece; W 81–33	5	Did not advance		9th place match Brazil; W 67–63	9
Majid Mokhtari; Ahmad Daghaghelehpour; Alireza Ahmadi; Morteza Gharibloo; Adel Torfi; Zakaria Hesamizadeh; Ebrahim Taghiloo; Alireza Danesh; Mohammad Reza Karimi; Gholamreza Nami; Bahman Seifi; Abolfazl Mousavi; Coach: Abdolghafour Kamrava	United States; L 50–73	5	Did not advance		9th place match Brazil; W 67–63	9
