= Iran at the 2026 Winter Paralympics =

- Flag of Iran
- IPC code: IRI
- NPC: I. R. Iran National Paralympic Committee

in Milan & Cortina d'Ampezzo, Italy 6 March 2026 – 15 March 2026
- Competitors: 0 (originally 1 man)
- Medals: Gold 0 Silver 0 Bronze 0 Total 0

Winter Paralympics appearances (overview)
- 1998; 2002; 2006; 2010; 2014; 2018; 2022; 2026

Iran was set to compete at the 2026 Winter Paralympics in Milan and Cortina d'Ampezzo, Italy, which is taking place between 6–15 March 2026. Iran withdrew its lone athlete who qualified.

== Background ==
Although the Iranian national committee had qualified one athlete in parasnowboarding at the end of the 2024–2025 season, he withdrew; Iran then received a wild card invitation to field at least one male cross-country skier, nominating Abolfazl Khatibi Mianaei, already a participant in the Pyeongchang 2018 and Beijing 2022 Winter Paralympics.

However hours ahead of the opening ceremony, Iran withdrew its sole athlete who is unable to travel to Italy due to unsafe travel conditions from the United States and Israel attack on Iran.

Mianaei was expected to compete at the men's standing sprint classic on 10 March and the men's standing 10 km interval-start classic on the following day.

== See also ==
- Iran at the Paralympics
- Iran at the 2026 Winter Olympics
