= Iran at the 2000 Summer Paralympics =

- IPC code: IRI
- NPC: I.R. Iran National Paralympic Committee
- Website: www.paralympic.ir

in Sydney
- Competitors: 40 in 5 sports
- Flag bearer: Morad Ali Shirani
- Medals Ranked 16th: Gold 12 Silver 4 Bronze 7 Total 23

Summer Paralympics appearances (overview)
- 1988; 1992; 1996; 2000; 2004; 2008; 2012; 2016; 2020; 2024

Athletes from the Islamic Republic of Iran competed at the 2000 Summer Paralympics in Sydney, Australia.

== Competitors ==
Sport	Men	Women	Total
Archery	3		3
Athletics	11	1	12
Powerlifting	7		7
Shooting	3	3	6
Volleyball	12		12
Total	36	4	40

== Medal summary ==
=== Medal table ===
Sport	Gold	Silver	Bronze	Total
Athletics	9	1	5	15
Powerlifting	1	3	1	5
Shooting	1		1	2
Volleyball	1			1
Total	12	4	7	23

=== Medalists ===
Medal	Name	Sport	Event
Gold	Ghader Modabber	Athletics	Men's shot put F52
Gold	Mokhtar Nourafshan	Athletics	Men's shot put F54
Gold	Ghader Modabber	Athletics	Men's discus throw F52
Gold	Abdolreza Jokar	Athletics	Men's discus throw F53
Gold	Mokhtar Nourafshan	Athletics	Men's discus throw F54
Gold	Mohammad Sadeghi Mehryar	Athletics	Men's discus throw F56
Gold	Aref Khosravinia	Athletics	Men's discus throw F57
Gold	Avaz Azmoudeh	Athletics	Men's javelin throw F54
Gold	Mohammad Reza Mirzaei	Athletics	Men's javelin throw F57
Gold	Amrollah Dehghani	Powerlifting	Men's 100 kg
Gold	Enayatollah Bokharaei	Shooting	Mixed 10 m air rifle prone SH1
Gold	Ali Eshghi; Hojjat Behravan; Ali Akbar Salavatian; Parviz Firouzi; Issa Zirahi; Jalil Imeri; Farshid Ashouri; Ali Golkar; Majid Soleimani; Ali Kashfia; Reza Peidayesh; Mohammad Reza Rahimi	Volleyball	Men's sitting
Silver	Dariush Namvar	Athletics	Men's discus throw F56
Silver	Fereydoun Karimipour	Powerlifting	Men's 56 kg
Silver	Mansour Dimasi	Powerlifting	Men's 75 kg
Silver	Saeid Bafandeh	Powerlifting	Men's 82.5 kg
Bronze	Abbas Mohseni	Athletics	Men's shot put F37
Bronze	Hossein Agha-Barghchi	Athletics	Men's discus throw F36
Bronze	Vahab Saalabi	Athletics	Men's javelin throw F42
Bronze	Ghader Modabber	Athletics	Men's javelin throw F52
Bronze	Abdolreza Jokar	Athletics	Men's javelin throw F53
Bronze	Allahbakhsh Akbari	Powerlifting	Men's 67.5 kg
Bronze	Nayyereh Akef	Shooting	Women's 10 m air pistol SH1

== Results by event ==
=== Archery ===
Men's recurve

Athlete	Event	Ranking round		1/16 final	1/8 final	Quarterfinal	Semifinal	Final	Rank
Athlete	Event	Score	Rank	1/16 final	1/8 final	Quarterfinal	Semifinal	Final	Rank
Heshmatollah Kazemi	Individual standing	549	16 Q	Marquez (ESP); W 141–125	Atamanenko (UKR); L 148–154	Did not advance			13
Majid Kehtari	Individual W2	563	21 Q	Wong (HKG); L 137–143	Did not advance				23
Ebrahim Ranjbar	Individual W2	576	16 Q	Anderson (GBR); W 148–145	Lee (KOR); L 139–156	Did not advance			15
Heshmatollah Kazemi; Majid Kehtari; Ebrahim Ranjbar	Team open	1688	12 Q		Slovakia; W 209–195	Italy; L 207–221	Did not advance		5

=== Athletics ===
Men

Athlete	Event	Result	Rank
Abbas Mohseni	Shot put F37	11.97	Bronze medal
Ghader Modabber	Shot put F52	7.63 WR	Gold medal
Ghader Modabber	Discus throw F52	17.79 WR	Gold medal
Ghader Modabber	Javelin throw F52	14.60	Bronze medal
Mokhtar Nourafshan	Shot put F54	8.96	Gold medal
Mokhtar Nourafshan	Discus throw F54	27.23	Gold medal
Mohammad Sadeghi Mehryar	Shot put F56	8.96	5
Mohammad Sadeghi Mehryar	Discus throw F56	37.36 WR	Gold medal
Hossein Agha-Barghchi	Discus throw F36	31.68	Bronze medal
Abdolreza Jokar	Discus throw F53	18.92	Gold medal
Abdolreza Jokar	Javelin throw F53	16.11	Bronze medal
Dariush Namvar	Discus throw F56	33.23	Silver medal
Aref Khosravinia	Discus throw F57	45.05 WR	Gold medal
Vahab Saalabi	Javelin throw F42	46.57	Bronze medal
Avaz Azmoudeh	Javelin throw F54	25.44	Gold medal
Mohammad Reza Mirzaei	Javelin throw F57	38.64 WR	Gold medal

Women

Athlete	Event	Result	Rank
Fatemeh Montazeri	Shot put F58	7.67	5
Fatemeh Montazeri	Javelin throw F58	did not start	

=== Powerlifting ===
Men

Athlete	Event	Result	Rank
Saeid Mokhtarian	52 kg	167.5	4
Fereydoun Karimipour	56 kg	190.0	Silver medal
Babak Mohammadi	60 kg	No mark	
Allahbakhsh Akbari	67.5 kg	200.0	Bronze medal
Mansour Dimasi	75 kg	210.0	Silver medal
Saeid Bafandeh	82.5 kg	227.5	Silver medal
Amrollah Dehghani	100 kg	232.5 WR	Gold medal

=== Shooting ===
Men

Athlete	Event	Qualification		Final		
Athlete	Event	Score	Rank	Score	Total	Rank
Jamal Asadi	10 m air pistol SH1	557	10	Did not advance		
Ramezan Salehnejad	10 m air rifle standing SH1	578	9	Did not advance		

Women

Athlete	Event	Qualification		Final		
Athlete	Event	Score	Rank	Score	Total	Rank
Nayyereh Akef	10 m air pistol SH1	372	3 Q	91.9	463.9	Bronze medal
Sedigheh Barmaki	10 m air rifle standing SH1	384	5 Q	101.1	485.1	4
Zahra Alibeigi	10 m air rifle standing SH1	373	13	Did not advance		

Mixed

Athlete	Event	Qualification		Final		
Athlete	Event	Score	Rank	Score	Total	Rank
Enayatollah Bokharaei	10 m air rifle prone SH1	598	6 Q	105.6	703.6	Gold medal
Ramezan Salehnejad	10 m air rifle prone SH1	599	2 Q	103.5	702.5	4

=== Volleyball ===
Men's sitting

Squad list	Preliminary round		Quarterfinal	Semifinal	Final	Rank
Squad list	Pool A	Rank	Quarterfinal	Semifinal	Final	Rank
Ali Eshghi; Hojjat Behravan; Ali Akbar Salavatian; Parviz Firouzi; Issa Zirahi; Jalil Imeri; Farshid Ashouri; Ali Golkar; Majid Soleimani; Ali Kashfia; Reza Peidayesh; Mohammad Reza Rahimi	Hungary; W 3–0	1 Q	Libya; W 3–0	Finland; W 3–0	Bosnia and Herzegovina; W 3–0	Gold medal
Ali Eshghi; Hojjat Behravan; Ali Akbar Salavatian; Parviz Firouzi; Issa Zirahi; Jalil Imeri; Farshid Ashouri; Ali Golkar; Majid Soleimani; Ali Kashfia; Reza Peidayesh; Mohammad Reza Rahimi	Germany; W 3–0	1 Q	Libya; W 3–0	Finland; W 3–0	Bosnia and Herzegovina; W 3–0	Gold medal
Ali Eshghi; Hojjat Behravan; Ali Akbar Salavatian; Parviz Firouzi; Issa Zirahi; Jalil Imeri; Farshid Ashouri; Ali Golkar; Majid Soleimani; Ali Kashfia; Reza Peidayesh; Mohammad Reza Rahimi	Netherlands; W 3–0	1 Q	Libya; W 3–0	Finland; W 3–0	Bosnia and Herzegovina; W 3–0	Gold medal
Ali Eshghi; Hojjat Behravan; Ali Akbar Salavatian; Parviz Firouzi; Issa Zirahi; Jalil Imeri; Farshid Ashouri; Ali Golkar; Majid Soleimani; Ali Kashfia; Reza Peidayesh; Mohammad Reza Rahimi	Japan; W 3–0	1 Q	Libya; W 3–0	Finland; W 3–0	Bosnia and Herzegovina; W 3–0	Gold medal
Ali Eshghi; Hojjat Behravan; Ali Akbar Salavatian; Parviz Firouzi; Issa Zirahi; Jalil Imeri; Farshid Ashouri; Ali Golkar; Majid Soleimani; Ali Kashfia; Reza Peidayesh; Mohammad Reza Rahimi	United States; W 3–0	1 Q	Libya; W 3–0	Finland; W 3–0	Bosnia and Herzegovina; W 3–0	Gold medal
