= Iran at the 2008 Summer Paralympics =

- IPC code: IRI
- NPC: I.R. Iran National Paralympic Committee
- Website: www.paralympic.ir

in Beijing
- Competitors: 72 in 9 sports
- Flag bearer: Mohammad Reza Mirzaei
- Medals Ranked 22nd: Gold 5 Silver 6 Bronze 3 Total 14

Summer Paralympics appearances (overview)
- 1988; 1992; 1996; 2000; 2004; 2008; 2012; 2016; 2020; 2024

Iran participated at the 2008 Summer Paralympics in Beijing, China. The country's delegation consists of 72 competitors in nine sports: football 7-a-side, goalball, judo, powerlifting, shooting, table tennis, track and field athletics, volleyball, and wheelchair basketball.

== Competitors ==
Sport	Men	Women	Total
Athletics	13	1	14
Football 7-a-side	11		11
Goalball	6		6
Judo	5		5
Powerlifting	7		7
Shooting	2	1	3
Sitting volleyball	12		12
Table tennis		2	2
Wheelchair basketball	12		12
Total	68	4	72

== Medal summary ==
=== Medal table ===
Sport	Gold	Silver	Bronze	Total
Athletics	2	3	1	6
Football 7-a-side			1	1
Judo		1		1
Powerlifting	2	2	1	5
Sitting volleyball	1			1
Total	5	6	3	14

=== Medalists ===
Medal	Name	Sport	Event
Gold	Javad Hardani	Athletics	Men's discus throw F37/38
Gold	Mohammad Reza Mirzaei	Athletics	Men's javelin throw F57/58
Gold	Hamzeh Mohammadi	Powerlifting	Men's 60 kg
Gold	Kazem Rajabi	Powerlifting	Men's +100 kg
Gold	Mohammad Hosseinifar; Mohammad Reza Rahimi; Reza Peidayesh; Davoud Alipourian; Mehdi Hamidzadeh; Nasser Hassanpour; Sadegh Bigdeli; Jalil Imeri; Saeid Ebrahimi; Issa Zirahi; Ramezan Salehi; Mohammad Khaleghi	Sitting volleyball	Men
Silver	Mehrdad Karamzadeh	Athletics	Men's discus throw F42
Silver	Ali Mohammadyari	Athletics	Men's discus throw F55/56
Silver	Abdolreza Jokar	Athletics	Men's javelin throw F53/54
Silver	Saeid Rahmati	Judo	Men's 60 kg
Silver	Ali Hosseini	Powerlifting	Men's 67.5 kg
Silver	Majid Farzin	Powerlifting	Men's 75 kg
Bronze	Javad Hardani	Athletics	Men's javelin throw F37/38
Bronze	Habibollah Heidarimehr; Esmaeil Malekzadeh; Gholamreza Najafi; Hadi Safari; Bahman Ansari; Ehsan Gholamhosseinpour; Morteza Heidari; Abdolreza Karimzadeh; Rasoul Atashafrouz; Moslem Akbari; Ardeshir Mahini	Football 7-a-side	Men
Bronze	Ali Sadeghzadeh	Powerlifting	Men's 100 kg

== Results by event ==
=== Athletics ===
Men

Athlete	Event	Round 1			Final		Rank
Athlete	Event	Heat	Time	Rank	Time	Rank	Rank
Ali Elahi	10000 m T12				34:38.75	8	8
Ali Elahi	5000 m T13	1	16:03.55	5 q	Did not finish		

Athlete	Event	Result	Score	Rank
Mehdi Asghari	Shot put F42	12.50		7
Mehrdad Karamzadeh	Shot put F42	13.58		5
Mehrdad Karamzadeh	Discus throw F42	44.74		2nd place, silver medalist(s)
Jalil Bagheri Jeddi	Shot put F55/56	9.99	882	12
Mehdi Moradi	Shot put F57/58	13.44	1002	6
Siamak Saleh-Farajzadeh	Discus throw F33/34/52	Did not start		
Jalal Khakzadieh	Discus throw F33/34/52	Did not start		
Javad Hardani	Discus throw F37/38	45.62 PR	1024	1st place, gold medalist(s)
Javad Hardani	Javelin throw F37/38	47.65	972	3rd place, bronze medalist(s)
Farzad Sepahvand	Discus throw F44	51.23	948	4
Ali Mohammadyari	Discus throw F55/56	39.39	1023	2nd place, silver medalist(s)
Mohsen Kaedi	Javelin throw F35/36	42.61	975	5
Abdolreza Jokar	Javelin throw F53/54	22.08 WR	1108	2nd place, silver medalist(s)
Mohammad Reza Mirzaei	Javelin throw F57/58	40.84 WR	1052	1st place, gold medalist(s)

Women

Athlete	Event	Result	Score	Rank
Fatemeh Montazeri	Shot put F57/58	9.01	927	8
Fatemeh Montazeri	Discus throw F57/58	28.20	897	8

=== Football 7-a-side ===
Men

Squad list	Preliminaries		Semifinal	Final	Rank
Squad list	Pool B	Rank	Semifinal	Final	Rank
Habibollah Heidarimehr; Esmaeil Malekzadeh; Gholamreza Najafi; Hadi Safari; Bahman Ansari; Ehsan Gholamhosseinpour; Morteza Heidari; Abdolreza Karimzadeh; Rasoul Atashafrouz; Moslem Akbari; Ardeshir Mahini; Coach: Alireza Raadi	Ireland; W 4–2	2 Q	Russia; L 0–5	3rd place match Brazil; W 4–0	3rd place, bronze medalist(s)
Habibollah Heidarimehr; Esmaeil Malekzadeh; Gholamreza Najafi; Hadi Safari; Bahman Ansari; Ehsan Gholamhosseinpour; Morteza Heidari; Abdolreza Karimzadeh; Rasoul Atashafrouz; Moslem Akbari; Ardeshir Mahini; Coach: Alireza Raadi	Great Britain; W 3–0	2 Q	Russia; L 0–5	3rd place match Brazil; W 4–0	3rd place, bronze medalist(s)
Habibollah Heidarimehr; Esmaeil Malekzadeh; Gholamreza Najafi; Hadi Safari; Bahman Ansari; Ehsan Gholamhosseinpour; Morteza Heidari; Abdolreza Karimzadeh; Rasoul Atashafrouz; Moslem Akbari; Ardeshir Mahini; Coach: Alireza Raadi	Ukraine; L 0–4	2 Q	Russia; L 0–5	3rd place match Brazil; W 4–0	3rd place, bronze medalist(s)

=== Goalball ===
Men

Squad list	Preliminaries		Quarterfinal	Semifinal	Final	Rank
Squad list	Group B	Rank	Quarterfinal	Semifinal	Final	Rank
Rahmatollah Hosseini; Mohammad Soranji; Mohsen Jalilvand; Behzad Jahangiri; Javad Jalali; Mehdi Sayyahi; Coach: Mohammad Bidgoli	Canada; L 5–9	5	Did not advance		9th place match Belgium; W 7–2	9
Rahmatollah Hosseini; Mohammad Soranji; Mohsen Jalilvand; Behzad Jahangiri; Javad Jalali; Mehdi Sayyahi; Coach: Mohammad Bidgoli	Brazil; W 8–5	5	Did not advance		9th place match Belgium; W 7–2	9
Rahmatollah Hosseini; Mohammad Soranji; Mohsen Jalilvand; Behzad Jahangiri; Javad Jalali; Mehdi Sayyahi; Coach: Mohammad Bidgoli	Sweden; L 5–10	5	Did not advance		9th place match Belgium; W 7–2	9
Rahmatollah Hosseini; Mohammad Soranji; Mohsen Jalilvand; Behzad Jahangiri; Javad Jalali; Mehdi Sayyahi; Coach: Mohammad Bidgoli	United States; L 3–4	5	Did not advance		9th place match Belgium; W 7–2	9
Rahmatollah Hosseini; Mohammad Soranji; Mohsen Jalilvand; Behzad Jahangiri; Javad Jalali; Mehdi Sayyahi; Coach: Mohammad Bidgoli	China; W 8–6	5	Did not advance		9th place match Belgium; W 7–2	9

=== Judo ===
Men

Athlete	Event	Round of 16	Quarterfinal	Semifinal	Repechage final	Final	Rank
Saeid Rahmati	60 kg	Borges (URU); W 1000–0010	Pérez (CUB); W 0100–0010	Li (CHN); W 1000–0000		Noura (ALG); L 0000–1000	2nd place, silver medalist(s)
Reza Golmohammadi	66 kg	García (ESP); W 1000–0000	Karpeniuk (UKR); W 0010–0003	Lamri (ALG); L 0000–1001		3rd place match Kallunki (FIN); L 0000–1000	5
Mousa Pourabbas	73 kg	Peltoniemi (FIN); W 1011–0000	Ramirez (ARG); L 0000–0010	Bye	Repechage; Hierrezuelo (CUB); L 0000–1011	Did not advance	7
Amir Mirhassan Nattaj	81 kg	Jonard (FRA); L 0000–1001	Did not advance	Repechage; Vincze (HUN); W 0002–0000	Repechage; Pominov (UKR); W 0101–0001	Repechage; Lencina (ARG); L 0001–0011	5
Hamzeh Nadri	100 kg	Silva (BRA); L 0000–1001	Did not advance	Repechage; Porter (USA); L 0000–1000	Did not advance		9

=== Powerlifting ===
Men

Athlete	Event	Result	Rank
Morteza Dashti	48 kg	No mark	
Gholam Hossein Chaltoukkar	56 kg	172.5	7
Hamzeh Mohammadi	60 kg	202.5 PR	1st place, gold medalist(s)
Ali Hosseini	67.5 kg	215.0	2nd place, silver medalist(s)
Majid Farzin	75 kg	212.5	2nd place, silver medalist(s)
Ali Sadeghzadeh	100 kg	230.0	3rd place, bronze medalist(s)
Kazem Rajabi	+100 kg	265.0 WR	1st place, gold medalist(s)

=== Shooting ===
Men

Athlete	Event	Qualification		Final		
Athlete	Event	Score	Rank	Score	Total	Rank
Bahman Karimi	10 m air pistol SH1	560	14	Did not advance		
Ramezan Salehnejad	10 m air rifle standing SH1	586	11	Did not advance		

Women

Athlete	Event	Qualification		Final		
Athlete	Event	Score	Rank	Score	Total	Rank
Nayyereh Akef	10 m air pistol SH1	360	11	Did not advance		

Mixed

Athlete	Event	Qualification		Final		
Athlete	Event	Score	Rank	Score	Total	Rank
Nayyereh Akef	50 m pistol SH1	507	23	Did not advance		
Bahman Karimi	50 m pistol SH1	536	4 Q	86.7	622.7	6
Ramezan Salehnejad	10 m air rifle prone SH1	588	42	Did not advance		
Ramezan Salehnejad	50 m rifle prone SH1	582	22	Did not advance		

=== Sitting volleyball ===
Men

Squad list	Preliminaries		Semifinal	Final	Rank
Squad list	Pool B	Rank	Semifinal	Final	Rank
Mohammad Hosseinifar; Mohammad Reza Rahimi; Reza Peidayesh; Davoud Alipourian; Mehdi Hamidzadeh; Nasser Hassanpour; Sadegh Bigdeli; Jalil Imeri; Saeid Ebrahimi; Issa Zirahi; Ramezan Salehi; Mohammad Khaleghi; Coach: Hadi Rezaei	Japan; W 3–0; 25–7, 25–7, 25–5	1 Q	Russia; W 3–0; 25–22, 25–13, 25–20	Bosnia and Herzegovina; W 3–0; 25–22, 25–18, 25–22	1st place, gold medalist(s)
Mohammad Hosseinifar; Mohammad Reza Rahimi; Reza Peidayesh; Davoud Alipourian; Mehdi Hamidzadeh; Nasser Hassanpour; Sadegh Bigdeli; Jalil Imeri; Saeid Ebrahimi; Issa Zirahi; Ramezan Salehi; Mohammad Khaleghi; Coach: Hadi Rezaei	Brazil; W 3–0; 25–9, 25–11, 25–8	1 Q	Russia; W 3–0; 25–22, 25–13, 25–20	Bosnia and Herzegovina; W 3–0; 25–22, 25–18, 25–22	1st place, gold medalist(s)
Mohammad Hosseinifar; Mohammad Reza Rahimi; Reza Peidayesh; Davoud Alipourian; Mehdi Hamidzadeh; Nasser Hassanpour; Sadegh Bigdeli; Jalil Imeri; Saeid Ebrahimi; Issa Zirahi; Ramezan Salehi; Mohammad Khaleghi; Coach: Hadi Rezaei	Egypt; W 3–0; 27–25, 25–12, 25–18	1 Q	Russia; W 3–0; 25–22, 25–13, 25–20	Bosnia and Herzegovina; W 3–0; 25–22, 25–18, 25–22	1st place, gold medalist(s)

=== Table tennis ===
Women

Athlete	Event	Preliminaries / Quarterfinal		Semifinal	Final	Rank
Athlete	Event	Groups	Rank	Semifinal	Final	Rank
Narges Khazaei	Singles 1/2	Lafaye (FRA); L 1–3; 5–11, 4–11, 12–10, 9–11	Group B 2	Did not advance		8
Narges Khazaei	Singles 1/2	Al-Bargouti (JOR); W 3–2; 11–6, 7–11, 11–9, 7–11, 11–6	Group B 2	Did not advance		8
Forough Bakhtiari	Singles 3	Kanova (SVK); L 0–3; 6–11, 4–11, 6–11	Group B 2	Did not advance		8
Forough Bakhtiari	Singles 3	Mariage (FRA); L 2–3; 11–6, 11–7, 9–11, 8–11, 8–11	Group B 2	Did not advance		8
Forough Bakhtiari	Singles 3	Ploner (ITA); W 3–0; 11–6, 11–6, 11–5	Group B 2	Did not advance		8
Forough Bakhtiari; Narges Khazaei	Team 1–3	Great Britain; L 2–3; 3–1, 0–3, 2–3, 3–0, 0–3		Did not advance		5

=== Wheelchair basketball ===
Men

Squad list	Preliminaries		Quarterfinal	Semifinal	Final	Rank
Squad list	Pool A	Rank	Quarterfinal	Semifinal	Final	Rank
Saman Bolaghi; Ahmad Daghaghelehpour; Alireza Ahmadi; Morteza Gharibloo; Adel Torfi; Zakaria Hesamizadeh; Hakim Mansouri; Ebrahim Ahmadi; Esmaeil Hosseinpour; Gholamreza Nami; Bahman Seifi; Vahid Gholam-Azad; Coach: Abdolghafour Kamrava	South Africa; W 73–62	3 Q	United States; L Walkover	disqualified		
Saman Bolaghi; Ahmad Daghaghelehpour; Alireza Ahmadi; Morteza Gharibloo; Adel Torfi; Zakaria Hesamizadeh; Hakim Mansouri; Ebrahim Ahmadi; Esmaeil Hosseinpour; Gholamreza Nami; Bahman Seifi; Vahid Gholam-Azad; Coach: Abdolghafour Kamrava	Sweden; W 92–66	3 Q	United States; L Walkover	disqualified		
Saman Bolaghi; Ahmad Daghaghelehpour; Alireza Ahmadi; Morteza Gharibloo; Adel Torfi; Zakaria Hesamizadeh; Hakim Mansouri; Ebrahim Ahmadi; Esmaeil Hosseinpour; Gholamreza Nami; Bahman Seifi; Vahid Gholam-Azad; Coach: Abdolghafour Kamrava	Japan; W 69–50	3 Q	United States; L Walkover	disqualified		
Saman Bolaghi; Ahmad Daghaghelehpour; Alireza Ahmadi; Morteza Gharibloo; Adel Torfi; Zakaria Hesamizadeh; Hakim Mansouri; Ebrahim Ahmadi; Esmaeil Hosseinpour; Gholamreza Nami; Bahman Seifi; Vahid Gholam-Azad; Coach: Abdolghafour Kamrava	Germany; L 63–73	3 Q	United States; L Walkover	disqualified		
Saman Bolaghi; Ahmad Daghaghelehpour; Alireza Ahmadi; Morteza Gharibloo; Adel Torfi; Zakaria Hesamizadeh; Hakim Mansouri; Ebrahim Ahmadi; Esmaeil Hosseinpour; Gholamreza Nami; Bahman Seifi; Vahid Gholam-Azad; Coach: Abdolghafour Kamrava	Canada; L 62–93	3 Q	United States; L Walkover	disqualified		
