= Iran at the 1992 Summer Paralympics =

- IPC code: IRI
- NPC: I.R. Iran National Paralympic Committee
- Website: www.paralympic.ir

in Barcelona
- Competitors: 29 in 3 sports
- Medals Ranked 41st: Gold 1 Silver 2 Bronze 1 Total 4

Summer Paralympics appearances (overview)
- 1988; 1992; 1996; 2000; 2004; 2008; 2012; 2016; 2020; 2024

Athletes from the Islamic Republic of Iran competed at the 1992 Summer Paralympics in Barcelona, Spain.

== Competitors ==
| Sport | Men | Women | Total |
|---|---|---|---|
| Athletics | 14 | | 14 |
| Table tennis | | 4 | 4 |
| Volleyball | 11 | | 11 |
| Total | 25 | 4 | 29 |

== Medal summary ==
=== Medal table ===
| Sport | Gold | Silver | Bronze | Total |
|---|---|---|---|---|
| Athletics | | 2 | 1 | 3 |
| Volleyball | 1 | | | 1 |
| Total | 1 | 2 | 1 | 4 |

=== Medalists ===
| Medal | Name | Sport | Event |
|---|---|---|---|
| Gold | Gholam Akhavan; Ahmad Shivani; Hadi Rezaei; Parviz Firouzi; Hassan Hashemi; Ali Akbar Salavatian; Hassan Mohammadi; Ali Golkar; Majid Soleimani; Ali Kashfia; Hassan Zendehgard | Volleyball | Men's sitting |
| Silver | Hossein Agha-Barghchi | Athletics | Men's shot put C6 |
| Silver | Avaz Azmoudeh | Athletics | Men's javelin throw THW4 |
| Bronze | Hossein Agha-Barghchi | Athletics | Men's discus throw C7 |

== Results by event ==
=== Athletics ===
Men

| Athlete | Event | Semifinal | | | Final | | Rank |
| Athlete | Event | Heat | Time | Rank | Time | Rank | Rank |
|---|---|---|---|---|---|---|---|
| Ghalandar Ataei | 100 m TS4 | 1 | did not start, Q | | 12.27 | 10 | 10 |
| Ghalandar Ataei | 200 m TS4 | 1 | 24.81 | 5 | did not advance | | 10 |
| Ghalandar Ataei | 400 m TS4 | 2 | 56.54 | 6 | did not advance | | 12 |

| Athlete | Event | Result | Rank |
|---|---|---|---|
| Majid Ghayyem | High jump J2 | 1.73 | 4 |
| Abbas Nouri | Long jump J4 | 5.66 | 9 |
| Abbas Nouri | Triple jump J3–4 | 11.78 | 6 |
| Ghalandar Ataei | Triple jump J3–4 | No mark | |
| Hossein Agha-Barghchi | Shot put C6 | 11.47 | Silver medal |
| Hossein Agha-Barghchi | Discus throw C7 | 34.82 | Bronze medal |
| Hossein Agha-Barghchi | Javelin throw C6 | 25.62 | 5 |
| Hossein Agha-Barghchi | Club throw C6 | 37.98 | 5 |
| Mohammad Hassani | Shot put THS3 | 11.77 | 6 |
| Mohammad Hassani | Discus throw THS3 | 37.34 | 5 |
| Mohammad Hassani | Pentathlon PS4 | 3502 | 4 |
| Ghorban Norouzi | Shot put THS3 | 11.01 | 9 |
| Ghorban Norouzi | Discus throw THS3 | No mark | |
| Hamid Jangjoo | Shot put THW3 | 4.98 | 5 |
| Hamid Jangjoo | Discus throw THW2–3 | 8.82 | 13 |
| Hamid Jangjoo | Javelin throw THW3 | 9.44 | 6 |
| Ebrahim Asghari | Shot put THW6 | 7.11 | 10 |
| Ebrahim Asghari | Discus throw THW6 | 29.86 | 7 |
| Mohammad Sadeghi Mehryar | Shot put THW6 | 8.97 | 5 |
| Mohammad Sadeghi Mehryar | Discus throw THW6 | 31.44 | 6 |
| Mohammad Sadeghi Mehryar | Pentathlon PW3–4 | 3913 | 14 |
| Gholam Amyari | Shot put THW7 | 7.65 | 15 |
| Gholam Amyari | Discus throw THW7 | 32.48 | 4 |
| Zahed Jebraeili | Shot put THW7 | 9.16 | 4 |
| Zahed Jebraeili | Javelin throw THW7 | 29.88 | 7 |
| Mohammad Reza Mirzaei | Shot put THW7 | 8.39 | 10 |
| Mohammad Reza Mirzaei | Discus throw THW7 | 24.68 | 16 |
| Mohammad Reza Mirzaei | Javelin throw THW7 | 34.04 | 4 |
| Ali Mousavi | Shot put THW7 | 8.04 | 11 |
| Ali Mousavi | Discus throw THW7 | 31.66 | 5 |
| Ali Mousavi | Javelin throw THW7 | 25.74 | 13 |
| Ali Mousavi | Pentathlon PW3–4 | 3809 | 15 |
| Avaz Azmoudeh | Discus throw THW4 | 23.84 | 5 |
| Avaz Azmoudeh | Javelin throw THW4 | 23.08 | Silver medal |

=== Table tennis ===
Women

| Athlete | Event | Preliminary round | | Quarterfinal | Semifinal | Final | Rank |
| Athlete | Event | Groups | Rank | Quarterfinal | Semifinal | Final | Rank |
|---|---|---|---|---|---|---|---|
| Mahnaz Kazemi | Singles 4 | Witschnig (AUT); L 0–2 | Group B 4 | | Did not advance | | 8 |
| Mahnaz Kazemi | Singles 4 | Johnson (USA); L 0–2 | Group B 4 | | Did not advance | | 8 |
| Mahnaz Kazemi | Singles 4 | Sikora (GER); L 0–2 | Group B 4 | | Did not advance | | 8 |
| Mansoureh Asvadi | Singles 5 | Roosen (GER); L 0–2 | Group D 4 | Did not advance | | | 13 |
| Mansoureh Asvadi | Singles 5 | Terranova (USA); L 0–2 | Group D 4 | Did not advance | | | 13 |
| Mansoureh Asvadi | Singles 5 | Hoffmann (MEX); L 0–2 | Group D 4 | Did not advance | | | 13 |
| Sara Azizi | Singles 5 | Wong (HKG); L 0–2 | Group B 4 | Did not advance | | | 13 |
| Sara Azizi | Singles 5 | van Brouwer (NED); L 0–2 | Group B 4 | Did not advance | | | 13 |
| Sara Azizi | Singles 5 | Zaugg (SUI); L 0–2 | Group B 4 | Did not advance | | | 13 |
| Masoumeh Kargar | Singles 5 | Nardelli (ITA); L 0–2 | Group C 4 | Did not advance | | | 13 |
| Masoumeh Kargar | Singles 5 | Nielsen (DEN); L 0–2 | Group C 4 | Did not advance | | | 13 |
| Masoumeh Kargar | Singles 5 | Blanc (SUI); L 0–2 | Group C 4 | Did not advance | | | 13 |
| Mansoureh Asvadi; Masoumeh Kargar; Mahnaz Kazemi | Team 5 | Austria; L 0–3 | Group B 4 | | Did not advance | | 7 |
| Mansoureh Asvadi; Masoumeh Kargar; Mahnaz Kazemi | Team 5 | Switzerland; L 0–3 | Group B 4 | | Did not advance | | 7 |
| Mansoureh Asvadi; Masoumeh Kargar; Mahnaz Kazemi | Team 5 | Italy; L 1–3 | Group B 4 | | Did not advance | | 7 |

| Athlete | Event | 1/32 final | 1/16 final | 1/8 final | Quarterfinal | Semifinal | Final | Rank |
|---|---|---|---|---|---|---|---|---|
| Mansoureh Asvadi | Singles 1–5 | bye | Pusztafine (HUN); W 2–0 | Zaugg (SUI); L 0–2 | Did not advance | | | 9 |
| Sara Azizi | Singles 1–5 | Sasvarine (HUN); W Walkover | Sikora (GER); L 0–2 | Did not advance | | | | 17 |
| Masoumeh Kargar | Singles 1–5 | bye | Pohle (GER); W Walkover | Terranova (USA); L 0–2 | Did not advance | | | 9 |
| Mahnaz Kazemi | Singles 1–5 | bye | Roosen (GER); L 0–2 | Did not advance | | | | 17 |

=== Volleyball ===
Men's sitting

| Squad list | Preliminary round | | Semifinal | Final | Rank |
| Squad list | Pool A | Rank | Semifinal | Final | Rank |
|---|---|---|---|---|---|
| Gholam Akhavan; Ahmad Shivani; Hadi Rezaei; Parviz Firouzi; Hassan Hashemi; Ali Akbar Salavatian; Hassan Mohammadi; Ali Golkar; Majid Soleimani; Ali Kashfia; Hassan Zendehgard | Germany; W 3–1 | 1 Q | Finland; W 3–0 | Netherlands; W 3–1 | Gold medal |
| Gholam Akhavan; Ahmad Shivani; Hadi Rezaei; Parviz Firouzi; Hassan Hashemi; Ali Akbar Salavatian; Hassan Mohammadi; Ali Golkar; Majid Soleimani; Ali Kashfia; Hassan Zendehgard | Spain; W 3–0 | 1 Q | Finland; W 3–0 | Netherlands; W 3–1 | Gold medal |
| Gholam Akhavan; Ahmad Shivani; Hadi Rezaei; Parviz Firouzi; Hassan Hashemi; Ali Akbar Salavatian; Hassan Mohammadi; Ali Golkar; Majid Soleimani; Ali Kashfia; Hassan Zendehgard | Sweden; W 3–0 | 1 Q | Finland; W 3–0 | Netherlands; W 3–1 | Gold medal |
| Gholam Akhavan; Ahmad Shivani; Hadi Rezaei; Parviz Firouzi; Hassan Hashemi; Ali Akbar Salavatian; Hassan Mohammadi; Ali Golkar; Majid Soleimani; Ali Kashfia; Hassan Zendehgard | Egypt; W 3–0 | 1 Q | Finland; W 3–0 | Netherlands; W 3–1 | Gold medal |
| Gholam Akhavan; Ahmad Shivani; Hadi Rezaei; Parviz Firouzi; Hassan Hashemi; Ali Akbar Salavatian; Hassan Mohammadi; Ali Golkar; Majid Soleimani; Ali Kashfia; Hassan Zendehgard | United States; W 3–0 | 1 Q | Finland; W 3–0 | Netherlands; W 3–1 | Gold medal |
