= Iran at the 1996 Summer Paralympics =

- IPC code: IRI
- NPC: I.R. Iran National Paralympic Committee
- Website: www.paralympic.ir

in Atlanta
- Competitors: 30 in 4 sports
- Medals Ranked 20th: Gold 9 Silver 5 Bronze 3 Total 17

Summer Paralympics appearances (overview)
- 1988; 1992; 1996; 2000; 2004; 2008; 2012; 2016; 2020; 2024

Athletes from the Islamic Republic of Iran competed at the 1996 Summer Paralympics in Atlanta, United States.

== Competitors ==
Sport	Men	Women	Total
Athletics	7		7
Powerlifting	6		6
Shooting	3	2	5
Volleyball	12		12
Total	28	2	30

== Medal summary ==
=== Medal table ===
Sport	Gold	Silver	Bronze	Total
Athletics	7	4	1	12
Powerlifting		1	2	3
Shooting	1			1
Volleyball	1			1
Total	9	5	3	17

=== Medalists ===
Medal	Name	Sport	Event
Gold	Ghader Modabber	Athletics	Men's shot put F51
Gold	Hossein Agha-Barghchi	Athletics	Men's discus throw F35
Gold	Ghader Modabber	Athletics	Men's discus throw F51
Gold	Abdolreza Jokar	Athletics	Men's discus throw F52
Gold	Ghader Modabber	Athletics	Men's javelin throw F51
Gold	Mokhtar Nourafshan	Athletics	Men's javelin throw F53
Gold	Mohammad Reza Mirzaei	Athletics	Men's javelin throw F56
Gold	Enayatollah Bokharaei	Shooting	Mixed 10 m air rifle prone SH1
Gold	Gholam Akhavan; Farshid Ashouri; Mohsen Barati; Jalil Imeri; Ali Golkar; Parviz Firouzi; Ali Kashfia; Hadi Rezaei; Ali Akbar Salavatian; Hassan Shahi; Ahmad Shivani; Majid Soleimani	Volleyball	Men's sitting
Silver	Mokhtar Nourafshan	Athletics	Men's shot put F53
Silver	Mohammad Sadeghi Mehryar	Athletics	Men's shot put F55
Silver	Mokhtar Nourafshan	Athletics	Men's discus throw F53
Silver	Mohammad Sadeghi Mehryar	Athletics	Men's discus throw F55
Silver	Fereydoun Karimipour	Powerlifting	Men's 56 kg
Bronze	Abdolreza Jokar	Athletics	Men's javelin throw F52
Bronze	Allahbakhsh Akbari	Powerlifting	Men's 60 kg
Bronze	Zeinal Siavoshani	Powerlifting	Men's 67.5 kg

== Results by event ==
=== Athletics ===
Men

Athlete	Event	Result	Rank
Hossein Agha-Barghchi	Shot put F35	Did not start	
Hossein Agha-Barghchi	Discus throw F35	35.92 WR	Gold medal
Mohammad Hassani	Shot put F43/44	12.74	9
Mohammad Hassani	Pentathlon P44	Did not finish	
Ghader Modabber	Shot put F51	7.17 WR	Gold medal
Ghader Modabber	Discus throw F51	16.48 PR	Gold medal
Ghader Modabber	Javelin throw F51	15.68 WR	Gold medal
Abdolreza Jokar	Shot put F52	6.13	5
Abdolreza Jokar	Discus throw F52	20.34 WR	Gold medal
Abdolreza Jokar	Javelin throw F52	15.08	Bronze medal
Mokhtar Nourafshan	Shot put F53	8.77	Silver medal
Mokhtar Nourafshan	Discus throw F53	27.12	Silver medal
Mokhtar Nourafshan	Javelin throw F53	25.78 PR	Gold medal
Mohammad Sadeghi Mehryar	Shot put F55	9.77	Silver medal
Mohammad Sadeghi Mehryar	Discus throw F55	35.52	Silver medal
Mohammad Reza Mirzaei	Shot put F56	11.08	5
Mohammad Reza Mirzaei	Javelin throw F56	40.42 PR	Gold medal

=== Powerlifting ===
Men

Athlete	Event	Result	Rank
Saeid Mokhtarian	52 kg	145.0	5
Fereydoun Karimipour	56 kg	170.0	Silver medal
Allahbakhsh Akbari	60 kg	177.5	Bronze medal
Zeinal Siavoshani	67.5 kg	185.0	Bronze medal
Amrollah Dehghani	90 kg	197.5	4
Mahmoud Kordkhili	+100 kg	200.0	9

=== Shooting ===
Men

Athlete	Event	Qualification		Final		
Athlete	Event	Score	Rank	Score	Total	Rank
Mohammad Mohammadi	10 m air rifle 3×40 SH1	1170	10	Did not advance		

Women

Athlete	Event	Qualification		Final		
Athlete	Event	Score	Rank	Score	Total	Rank
Zahra Alibeigi	10 m air rifle standing SH1	368	15	Did not advance		

Mixed

Athlete	Event	Qualification		Final		
Athlete	Event	Score	Rank	Score	Total	Rank
Enayatollah Bokharaei	10 m air rifle prone SH1	600 =WR	1 Q	105.8	705.8 PR	Gold medal
Mohammad Mohammadi	10 m air rifle prone SH1	599	5 Q	103.3	702.3	8
Ramezan Salehnejad	10 m air rifle prone SH1	597	11	Did not advance		
Fatemeh Raef	10 m air rifle prone SH2	546	26	Did not advance		

=== Volleyball ===
Men's sitting

Squad list	Preliminary round		Quarterfinal	Semifinal	Final	Rank
Squad list	Pool A	Rank	Quarterfinal	Semifinal	Final	Rank
Gholam Akhavan; Farshid Ashouri; Mohsen Barati; Jalil Imeri; Ali Golkar; Parviz Firouzi; Ali Kashfia; Hadi Rezaei; Ali Akbar Salavatian; Hassan Shahi; Ahmad Shivani; Majid Soleimani	Hungary; W 3–0	1 Q	Ukraine; W 3–0	Netherlands; W 3–0	Norway; W 3–1	Gold medal
Gholam Akhavan; Farshid Ashouri; Mohsen Barati; Jalil Imeri; Ali Golkar; Parviz Firouzi; Ali Kashfia; Hadi Rezaei; Ali Akbar Salavatian; Hassan Shahi; Ahmad Shivani; Majid Soleimani	Kazakhstan; W 3–0	1 Q	Ukraine; W 3–0	Netherlands; W 3–0	Norway; W 3–1	Gold medal
Gholam Akhavan; Farshid Ashouri; Mohsen Barati; Jalil Imeri; Ali Golkar; Parviz Firouzi; Ali Kashfia; Hadi Rezaei; Ali Akbar Salavatian; Hassan Shahi; Ahmad Shivani; Majid Soleimani	Finland; W 3–1	1 Q	Ukraine; W 3–0	Netherlands; W 3–0	Norway; W 3–1	Gold medal
Gholam Akhavan; Farshid Ashouri; Mohsen Barati; Jalil Imeri; Ali Golkar; Parviz Firouzi; Ali Kashfia; Hadi Rezaei; Ali Akbar Salavatian; Hassan Shahi; Ahmad Shivani; Majid Soleimani	Russia; W 3–0	1 Q	Ukraine; W 3–0	Netherlands; W 3–0	Norway; W 3–1	Gold medal
Gholam Akhavan; Farshid Ashouri; Mohsen Barati; Jalil Imeri; Ali Golkar; Parviz Firouzi; Ali Kashfia; Hadi Rezaei; Ali Akbar Salavatian; Hassan Shahi; Ahmad Shivani; Majid Soleimani	Argentina; W 3–0	1 Q	Ukraine; W 3–0	Netherlands; W 3–0	Norway; W 3–1	Gold medal
