= Iran at the 1988 Summer Paralympics =

- IPC code: IRI (IRN used at these Games)
- NPC: I.R. Iran National Paralympic Committee
- Website: www.paralympic.ir

in Seoul
- Competitors: 35 in 4 sports
- Medals Ranked 28th: Gold 4 Silver 1 Bronze 3 Total 8

Summer Paralympics appearances (overview)
- 1988; 1992; 1996; 2000; 2004; 2008; 2012; 2016; 2020; 2024

Athletes from the Islamic Republic of Iran competed at the 1988 Summer Paralympics in Seoul, South Korea.

== Competitors ==
Sport	Men	Women	Total
Athletics	16		16
Goalball	6		6
Powerlifting	1		1
Volleyball	12		12
Total	35		35

== Medal summary ==
=== Medal table ===
Sport	Gold	Silver	Bronze	Total
Athletics	3	1	3	7
Volleyball	1			1
Total	4	1	3	8

=== Medalists ===
Medal	Name	Sport	Event
Gold	Mokhtar Nourafshan	Athletics	Men's discus throw 3
Gold	Hadi Yarahmadi	Athletics	Men's javelin throw 4
Gold	Javad Abdollahzadeh	Athletics	Men's javelin throw 5
Gold	Ali Kashfia; Mohammad Hossein Parastar; Kazem Esmaeilian; Mohammad Ali Tabatabaei; Mohammad Mostafavi; Ahmad Shivani; Mohsen Barati; Hadi Rezaei; Reza Gozali; Hossein Hashemi; Saeid Hanifi; Reza Bodaghi	Volleyball	Men's sitting
Silver	Ahmad Rezaei	Athletics	Men's javelin throw L5
Bronze	Ali Asghar Hadizadeh	Athletics	Men's shot put L5
Bronze	Reza Chavoshi	Athletics	Men's discus throw 3
Bronze	Hassan Samavati	Athletics	Men's discus throw A1–3/A9/L3

== Results by event ==
=== Athletics ===
Men

Athlete	Event	1st round			Quarterfinal			Semifinal			Final		Rank
Athlete	Event	Heat	Time	Rank	Heat	Time	Rank	Heat	Time	Rank	Time	Rank	Rank
Jahanbakhsh Pakhireh	100 m 4	Bye						2	17.27	5	did not advance		10
Jahanbakhsh Pakhireh	200 m 4	3	35.63	8 q				1	34.84	8	did not advance		14
Jahanbakhsh Pakhireh	400 m 4	6	1:15.91	3 Q	1	1:13.37	7	did not advance					20
Gholamreza Rasouli	100 m 4	Bye						2	19.35	8	did not advance		16
Gholamreza Rasouli	200 m 4	2	36.95	3 Q				2	37.23	8	did not advance		16
Gholamreza Rasouli	Slalom 4										2:00.2	6	6
Hassan Samavati	100 m A1–3/A9/L2	3	20.83	5							Did not advance		15
Ghalandar Ataei	100 m A6/A8/A9/L4	1	12.05	5 q				1	11.88	5	did not advance		9
Javad Abdollahzadeh	200 m 5–6	1	42.71	8				Did not advance					29
Mostafa Porkareh	Slalom 2										2:06.3	4	4

Athlete	Event	Result	Rank
Ghalandar Ataei	Long jump A6/A8/A9/L6	5.77	7
Ghalandar Ataei	Triple jump A6/A8/A9/L6	12.22	4
Mohammad Kamyabi	Shot put 2	5.55	6
Mohammad Kamyabi	Javelin throw 2	18.88	6
Reza Chavoshi	Shot put 3	7.97	4
Reza Chavoshi	Discus throw 3	29.46	Bronze medal
Ali Asghar Hadizadeh	Shot put L5	10.79	Bronze medal
Ali Asghar Hadizadeh	Javelin throw L5	30.00	7
Mokhtar Nourafshan	Discus throw 3	29.94	Gold medal
Mokhtar Nourafshan	Javelin throw 3	20.78	5
Ebrahim Askar	Discus throw 4	32.42	5
Hassan Samavati	Discus throw A1-3/A9/L3	23.94	Bronze medal
Hassan Samavati	Javelin throw A1-3/A9/L3	21.08	4
Mohammad Reza Naghavizadeh	Discus throw A4/A9	32.02	8
Mohammad Reza Naghavizadeh	Javelin throw A4/A9	39.40	5
Hadi Yarahmadi	Javelin throw 4	27.52	Gold medal
Javad Abdollahzadeh	Javelin throw 5	28.32 WR	Gold medal
Ahmad Rezaei	Javelin throw L5	36.84	Silver medal
Mohammad Sadeghi Mehryar	Pentathlon 4	3202.60	4
Mohammad Hassani	Pentathlon A4/A9	2788.82	6

=== Goalball ===
Men

Squad list	Preliminary round		2nd round	Semifinal	Final	Rank
Squad list	Group B	Rank	2nd round	Semifinal	Final	Rank
Behrouz Garshasbi; Reza Mehrani; Javad Rezaei; Fereydoun Asadi; Mahmoud Rezaei; Ali Sardivand	Finland; L 0–1	–	Disqualified			
Behrouz Garshasbi; Reza Mehrani; Javad Rezaei; Fereydoun Asadi; Mahmoud Rezaei; Ali Sardivand	Israel; L Walkover	–	Disqualified			
Behrouz Garshasbi; Reza Mehrani; Javad Rezaei; Fereydoun Asadi; Mahmoud Rezaei; Ali Sardivand	Hungary; L Disqualified	–	Disqualified			
Behrouz Garshasbi; Reza Mehrani; Javad Rezaei; Fereydoun Asadi; Mahmoud Rezaei; Ali Sardivand	Egypt; L Disqualified	–	Disqualified			
Behrouz Garshasbi; Reza Mehrani; Javad Rezaei; Fereydoun Asadi; Mahmoud Rezaei; Ali Sardivand	West Germany; L Disqualified	–	Disqualified			
Behrouz Garshasbi; Reza Mehrani; Javad Rezaei; Fereydoun Asadi; Mahmoud Rezaei; Ali Sardivand	Netherlands; L Disqualified	–	Disqualified			

=== Powerlifting ===
Men

Athlete	Event	Result	Rank
Ali Akbar Ey-Vatan	67.5 kg	125.0	6

=== Volleyball ===
Men's sitting

Squad list	Preliminary round		Semifinal	Final	Rank
Squad list	Pool B	Rank	Semifinal	Final	Rank
Ali Kashfia; Mohammad Hossein Parastar; Kazem Esmaeilian; Mohammad Ali Tabatabaei; Mohammad Mostafavi; Ahmad Shivani; Mohsen Barati; Hadi Rezaei; Reza Gozali; Hossein Hashemi; Saeid Hanifi; Reza Bodaghi	West Germany; W 3–0	1 Q	Norway; W 3–1	Netherlands; W 3–1	Gold medal
Ali Kashfia; Mohammad Hossein Parastar; Kazem Esmaeilian; Mohammad Ali Tabatabaei; Mohammad Mostafavi; Ahmad Shivani; Mohsen Barati; Hadi Rezaei; Reza Gozali; Hossein Hashemi; Saeid Hanifi; Reza Bodaghi	Yugoslavia; W 3–0	1 Q	Norway; W 3–1	Netherlands; W 3–1	Gold medal
Ali Kashfia; Mohammad Hossein Parastar; Kazem Esmaeilian; Mohammad Ali Tabatabaei; Mohammad Mostafavi; Ahmad Shivani; Mohsen Barati; Hadi Rezaei; Reza Gozali; Hossein Hashemi; Saeid Hanifi; Reza Bodaghi	United States; W 3–0	1 Q	Norway; W 3–1	Netherlands; W 3–1	Gold medal
Ali Kashfia; Mohammad Hossein Parastar; Kazem Esmaeilian; Mohammad Ali Tabatabaei; Mohammad Mostafavi; Ahmad Shivani; Mohsen Barati; Hadi Rezaei; Reza Gozali; Hossein Hashemi; Saeid Hanifi; Reza Bodaghi	Hungary; W 3–1	1 Q	Norway; W 3–1	Netherlands; W 3–1	Gold medal
