= Iran at the 2020 Summer Paralympics =

- Flag of Iran
- IPC code: IRI
- NPC: I.R. Iran National Paralympic Committee
- Website: www.paralympic.ir

in Tokyo
- Competitors: 62 in 10 sports
- Flag bearers (opening): Zahra Nemati & Nourmohammad Arekhi
- Flag bearer (closing): Sareh Javanmardi
- Medals Ranked 13th: Gold 12 Silver 11 Bronze 1 Total 24

Summer Paralympics appearances (overview)
- 1988; 1992; 1996; 2000; 2004; 2008; 2012; 2016; 2020; 2024

Iran competed at the 2020 Summer Paralympics in Tokyo, Japan, from 24 August to 5 September 2021. This was their ninth consecutive appearance at the Summer Paralympics since 1988.

== Medalists ==
Medal	Name	Sport	Event	Date
Gold	Rouhollah Rostami	Powerlifting	Men's 80 kg	28 August
Gold	Vahid Nouri	Judo	Men's 90 kg	29 August
Gold	Mohammadreza Kheirollahzadeh	Judo	Men's +100 kg	29 August
Gold	Amir Khosravani	Athletics	Men's long jump T12	30 August
Gold	Mahdi Olad	Athletics	Men's shot put F11	30 August
Gold	Hashemiyeh Motaghian	Athletics	Women's javelin throw F56	31 August
Gold	Sareh Javanmardi	Shooting	Women's 10 metre air pistol SH1	31 August
Gold	Saeid Afrooz	Athletics	Men's javelin throw F34	1 September
Gold	Zahra Nemati	Archery	Women's individual recurve open	2 September
Gold	Hamed Amiri	Athletics	Men's javelin throw F54	3 September
Gold	Iran men's national sitting volleyball team: Mehrzad Mehravan; Morteza Mehrzad; Meisam Ali Pour; Davoud Alipourian; Morteza Ramezani Gerakoei; Seyed Mohammed Hossein Hosseini Jed; Sadegh Bigdeli; Majid Lashkarisanami; Hossein Golestani; Mohammed Nemati; Ramezan Salehihajikolaei; Mahdi Babadi	Sitting volleyball	Men's tournament	4 September
Gold	Asghar Aziziaghdam	Taekwondo	Men's +75 kg	4 September
Silver	Amir Jafari	Powerlifting	Men's 65 kg	27 August
Silver	Amanolah Papi	Athletics	Men's javelin throw F57	28 August
Silver	Alireza Mokhtari	Athletics	Men's shot put F53	29 August
Silver	Hamed Solhipour	Powerlifting	Men's 97 kg	29 August
Silver	Mansour Pourmirzaei	Powerlifting	Men's +107 kg	30 August
Silver	Ramezan Biabani	Archery	Men's individual compound open	31 August
Silver	Mahdi Olad	Athletics	Men's discus throw F11	2 September
Silver	Ali Pirouj	Athletics	Men's javelin throw F13	2 September
Silver	Mahdi Pourrahnama	Taekwondo	Men's 75 kg	3 September
Silver	Sadegh Beit Sayah	Athletics	Men's javelin throw F41	4 September
Silver	Sajad Mohammadian	Athletics	Men's shot put F63	4 September
Bronze	Saman Razi	Powerlifting	Men's 107 kg	30 August

Medals by sport
Sport	Gold medal	Silver medal	Bronze medal	Total
Athletics	5	6	0	11
Judo	2	0	0	2
Powerlifting	1	3	1	5
Archery	1	1	0	2
Taekwondo	1	1	0	2
Shooting	1	0	0	1
Sitting volleyball	1	0	0	1
Total	12	11	1	24

Medals by date
Day	Date	Gold medal	Silver medal	Bronze medal	Total
1	24 August	0	0	0	0
2	25 August	0	0	0	0
3	26 August	0	0	0	0
4	27 August	0	1	0	1
5	28 August	1	1	0	2
6	29 August	2	2	0	4
7	30 August	2	1	1	4
8	31 August	2	1	0	3
9	1 September	1	0	0	1
10	2 September	1	2	0	3
11	3 September	1	1	0	2
12	4 September	2	2	0	4
13	5 September	0	0	0	0
Total		12	11	1	24

Medals by gender^{(Comparison graphs)}
Gender	1st place, gold medalist(s)	2nd place, silver medalist(s)	3rd place, bronze medalist(s)	Total	Percentage
Male	9	11	1	21	87.5%
Female	3	0	0	3	12.5%
Mixed	0	0	0	0	0%
Total	12	11	1	24	100%

== Competitors ==
Sport	Men	Women	Total
Archery	4	2	6
Athletics	14	2	16
Canoeing	1	1	2
Cycling	1	0	1
Judo	2	0	2
Powerlifting	5	0	5
Sitting Volleyball	12	0	12
Shooting	0	3	3
Taekwondo	2	1	3
Wheelchair Basketball	12	0	12
Total	53	9	62

== Archery ==
Iran qualified one athlete in Men's Individual W1, one athlete in Men's Individual Compound Open, two ticket in Men's Individual Recurve, one athlete in Women's Individual Compound and one athlete in Women's Individual Recurve.

Men's individual

Athlete	Event	Ranking round		Round of 32	Round of 16	Quarterfinals	Semifinals	Final / BM	
Athlete	Event	Score	Seed	Opposition Score	Opposition Score	Opposition Score	Opposition Score	Opposition Score	Rank
Mohammad Reza Zandi	W1	643 SB	6	Bye	Bye	Li Ji (CHN); W 137–129	Drahonínský (CZE); L 131–139	Hekimoğlu (TUR); L 134–139	4
Alisina Manshaezadeh	Compound	699 PB	4	Coates-Palgrave (RSA); W 143–130	Forsberg (FIN); L 143–145	did not advance			
Ramezan Biabani	Compound	699 PB	2	Marchant (AUS); W 141–139	Van Montagu (BEL); W 143–142	Shigaef (RPC); W 143(X)–143(9)	Ai (CHN); W 146–144	He (CHN); L 143–147	2nd place, silver medalist(s)
Gholamreza Rahimi	Recurve	644 PR	1	Bye	Mather (USA); L 5–6	did not advance			

Women's individual

Athlete	Event	Ranking round		Round of 32	Round of 16	Quarterfinals	Semifinals	Final / BM	
Athlete	Event	Score	Seed	Opposition Score	Opposition Score	Opposition Score	Opposition Score	Opposition Score	Rank
Farzaneh Asgari	Compound	677 PB	12	Bye	Rubio (ESP); W 140–134	Virgilio (ITA); L 135–136	did not advance		
Zahra Nemati	Recurve	630	3	Bye	Barantseva (RPC); W 6–5	Dergovics (BRA); W 7–1	Poimenidou (GRE); W 6–2	Petrilli (ITA); W 6–5	1st place, gold medalist(s)

Mixed team

Athlete	Event	Ranking round		Round of 32	Round of 16	Quarterfinals	Semifinals	Final / BM	
Athlete	Event	Score	Seed	Opposition Score	Opposition Score	Opposition Score	Opposition Score	Opposition Score	Rank
Farzaneh Asgari; Ramezan Biabani	Mix compound	1376	4	Bye	Bye	Great Britain (GBR); W 153–151	China (CHN); L 146–150	RPC (RPC); L 151–153	4
Zahra Nemati; Gholamreza Rahimi	Mix recurve	1274	2	Bye	Bye	Great Britain (GBR); W 6–0	Italy (ITA); L 3–5	China (CHN); L 2–6	4

== Athletics ==
16 athletes in 19 events represented Iran at the 2020 Summer Paralympics.

Athlete	Events	Heats		Final	
Athlete	Events	Time	Rank	Time	Rank
Men's Track
Vahid Alinajimi	Men's 100m T13	11.18 PB	9	did not advance	
Vahid Alinajimi	Men's 400m T13	50.25 PB	9	did not advance	
Men's Field
Hamed Amiri	Men's javelin throw F54	—N/a		31.35	(gold) PR
Saeid Afrooz	Men's javelin throw F34	—N/a		40.05	(gold) WR
Sadegh Beit Sayah	Men's javelin throw F41	—N/a		43.35	(silver) PB
Amir Khosravani	Men's long jump T12	—N/a		7.21	(gold) PB
Nourmohammad Arekhi	Men's discus throw F11	—N/a		33.37	6 SB
Nourmohammad Arekhi	Men's shot put F11	—N/a		12.78	6 SB
Ali Pirouj	Men's javelin throw F13	—N/a		64.30	(silver) PB
Alireza Mokhtari	Men's shot put F53	—N/a		8.48	(silver) SB
Saman Pakbaz	Men's shot put F12	—N/a		14.29	5
Ali Asghar Javanmardi	Men's shot put F35	—N/a		15.40	4
Sajad Mohammadian	Men's shot put F63	—N/a		14.88	(silver) SB
Siamak Saleh Farajzadeh	Men's shot put F34	—N/a		10.80	6 SB
Mahdi Olad	Men's discus throw F11	—N/a		40.60	(silver) SB
Mahdi Olad	Men's shot put F11	—N/a		14.43	(gold) SB
Amanolah Papi	Men's javelin throw F57	—N/a		49.56	(silver) AR
Women's Field
Hashemiyeh Motaghian	Women's javelin throw F56	—N/a		24.50	(gold) WR
Elnaz Darabian	Women's disk throw F53	—N/a		12.49	6 AR

== Cycling ==
Iran sent one cyclist after successfully getting a slot in the 2018 UCI Nations Ranking Allocation quota for Asia.

Athlete	Event	Time	Rank
Mahdi Mohammadi	Men's road race C4-5	Did not finish	-
Mahdi Mohammadi	Men's road time trial C5	53:49.65	11
Mahdi Mohammadi	Men's track individual pursuit C5	5:09.154	10

== Judo ==
Iran has qualified two athletes in Men's events in 90 and +100 kg.

Athlete	Event	Round of 16	Quarterfinals	Semifinals	Repechage round 1	Repechage round 2	Final / BM	
Athlete	Event	Opposition Result	Opposition Result	Opposition Result	Opposition Result	Opposition Result	Opposition Result	Rank
Vahid Nouri	90 kg	Bye	Cavalcante (BRA); W 10s1–0	Latchoumanaya (FRA); W 1s2–0s1	Bye	Bye	Stewart (GBR); W 10–0s2	1st place, gold medalist(s)
Mohammadreza Kheirollahzadeh	+100kg	Bye	Subba (JAM); W 10s1–0s1	Gwang-geun (KOR); W 10–0s1	Bye	Bye	Chikoidze (GEO); W 10s1–0	1st place, gold medalist(s)

== Canoeing ==
Iran has qualified one athlete in Women's KL3 events and one athlete in Men's VL2.

Athlete	Event	Heats		Semi-Finals		Final	
Athlete	Event	Time	Rank	Time	Rank	Time	Rank
Men
Eslam Jahedi	Men's VL2 200m	1:01.395	4 SF	58.057	4	Did not advance	
Women
Shahla Behrouzirad	Women's KL3 200m	54.755	4 SF	51.316	3 FA	52.789	7

== Powerlifting ==
Athlete	Event	Result	Rank
Men
Amir Jafari	Men's 65kg	195	2nd place, silver medalist(s)
Rouhollah Rostami	Men's 80kg	234	1st place, gold medalist(s)
Hamed Solhipour	Men's 97kg	222	2nd place, silver medalist(s)
Saman Razi	Men's 107kg	231	3rd place, bronze medalist(s)
Mansour Pourmirzaei	Men's +107kg	241	2nd place, silver medalist(s)

== Shooting ==
Iran entered five athletes into the Paralympic competition. All of them successfully broke the Paralympic qualification at the 2018 WSPS World Championships which was held in Cheongju, South Korea, 2019 WSPS World Cup which was held in Al Ain, United Arab Emirates and 2019 WSPS World Championships which was held in Sydney, Australia.

Athlete	Event	Qualification		Final	
Athlete	Event	Score	Rank	Score	Rank
Women
Sareh Javanmardi	Women's P2 – 10 m air pistol SH1	572 QF QPR	1	239.2	(gold) WR PR
Samira Eram	Women's P2 – 10 m air pistol SH1	532	17	did not advance	
Roghayeh Shojaei	Women's R2 – 10 m air rifle standing SH1	624.1 QF	4	163.0	6
Mixed
Sareh Javanmardi	Mixed P4 – 50 m pistol SH1	539 QF	3	118.8	7
Samira Eram	Mixed P4 – 50 m pistol SH1	465	34	did not advance	
Roghayeh Shojaei	Mixed R3 – 10 m air rifle prone SH1	626.2	39	did not advance	

== Sitting Volleyball ==
Iran's men's sitting volleyball team qualified for the 2020 Summer Paralympics after winning the 2018 World ParaVolley Championships.

Summary

Team	Event	Group stage				Semifinal	Final / BM / Cl.	
Team	Event	Opposition Score	Opposition Score	Opposition Score	Rank	Opposition Score	Opposition Score	Rank
Iran men's	Men's tournament	Germany; W 3–0	Brazil; W 3–0	China; W 3–0	1	Bosnia and Herzegovina; W 3–0	RPC; W 3–1	1st place, gold medalist(s)

=== Men's tournament ===
Group play

Pos	Team	Pld	W	L	Pts	SW	SL	SR	SPW	SPL	SPR	Qualification
1	Iran	3	3	0	3	9	0	MAX	225	177	1.271	Semifinals
2	Brazil	3	1	2	1	4	7	0.571	253	258	0.981	Semifinals
3	Germany	3	1	2	1	4	7	0.571	247	258	0.957	Fifth place match
4	China	3	1	2	1	4	7	0.571	241	273	0.883	Seventh place match

Source: TOCOG

28 August 2021; 10:00 v	Iran	3–0	Germany	Makuhari Messe, Tokyo; Referees: Vanessa Redes (BRA), Khalid Shanishah (LBA)
28 August 2021; 10:00 v	(25–23, 25–16, 25–17); Results Statistics			Makuhari Messe, Tokyo; Referees: Vanessa Redes (BRA), Khalid Shanishah (LBA)

30 August 2021; 20:30 v	Iran	3–0	Brazil	Makuhari Messe, Tokyo; Referees: Ritsuto Yamamichi (JPN), Krisztina Árpás (HUN)
30 August 2021; 20:30 v	(25–19, 25–23, 25–22); Results Statistics			Makuhari Messe, Tokyo; Referees: Ritsuto Yamamichi (JPN), Krisztina Árpás (HUN)

31 August 2021; 18:30 v	China	0–3	Iran	Makuhari Messe, Tokyo; Referees: Christina Fiebich (USA), Toomas Murulo (EST)
31 August 2021; 18:30 v	(21–25, 22–25, 14–25); Results Statistics			Makuhari Messe, Tokyo; Referees: Christina Fiebich (USA), Toomas Murulo (EST)

Semi-final

2 September 2021; 20:30 v	Iran	3–0	Bosnia and Herzegovina	Makuhari Messe, Tokyo; Referees: Dominik Raca (CRO), Andre Calado (BRA)
2 September 2021; 20:30 v	(25–16, 25–16, 25–17); Results Statistics			Makuhari Messe, Tokyo; Referees: Dominik Raca (CRO), Andre Calado (BRA)

Final

4 September 2021; 19:00 v	(silver) RPC (RPC)	1–3	Iran (gold)	Makuhari Messe, Tokyo; Referees: Toomas Murulo (EST), Benno Meijer (NED)
4 September 2021; 19:00 v	(21–25, 14–25, 25–19, 17–25); Results Statistics			Makuhari Messe, Tokyo; Referees: Toomas Murulo (EST), Benno Meijer (NED)

== Taekwondo ==
Iran qualified three athletes to compete at the Paralympics competition. Two of them qualified by entered top six in the world ranking, while the other athlete qualified by winning the gold medal at the 2021 Asian Qualification Tournament in Amman, Jordan.

Athlete	Event	First round	Quarterfinals	Semifinals	First repechage round	Repechage semi-final	Final / BM	
Athlete	Event	Opposition Result	Opposition Result	Opposition Result	Opposition Result	Opposition Result	Opposition Result	Rank
Men
Mahdi Pourrahnama	Men's −75 kg	Bye	Çelik (TUR); W 37–21	Dombayev (KAZ); W 24–6	Bye	Bye	García Lopez (MEX); L 20–26	2nd place, silver medalist(s)
Asghar Aziziaghdam	Men's +75 kg	Bye	Molina (CRC); W 11–9	Ataev (RPC); W 9–4	Bye	Bye	Mikulić (CRO); W 12–10	1st place, gold medalist(s)
Women
Rayehe Shahab	Women's +58 kg	Naimova (UZB); L 9–30	did not advance		Mariscal (MEX); W 17–10	Akermach (MAR); WWD	Truesdale (GBR); L 31–41	5

== Wheelchair basketball ==
Iran's men's wheelchair basketball team qualified for the 2020 Summer Paralympics after finishing in top three at the 2019 IWBF Asia Oceania Wheelchair Basketball Championship in Pattaya, Thailand. The following is the Iran roster in the men's wheelchair basketball tournament of the 2020 Summer Paralympics.

Islamic Rep. of Iran men's national wheelchair basketball team - 2020 Summer Paralympics roster
Players
Coaches

No.	Name	Age – Date of birth	Pts.
4	Faleh Ayashi	33 – 23 September 1987	2.0
5	Hassan Abdi	35 – 22 November 1985	2.0
6	Amirreza Ahmadi	20 – 16 October 2000	3.5
7	Mohsen Tolouei Tamardash	36 – 5 April 1985	3.5
8	Vahid Saadatpoormoghadam	37 – 20 August 1984	2.5
9	Danial Zakeri Dehvosta	33 – 18 April 1988	1.0
10	Mohammad Mohammad Nezhad	29 – 30 January 1992	1.0
11	Abdoljalil Gharanjik	34 – 26 December 1986	1.5
12	Mohammadhassan Sayari	24 – 17 August 1997	4.0
13	Reza Eivazi	22 – 2 January 1999	4.0
14	Mojtaba Kamali	22 – 9 October 1998	4.5
15	Iman Bagzadehfard	34 – 11 February 1987	4.0

Head coach

Abbas Aghakoucheki

Assistant coach(es)

Kamal Eshgh

Legend

- Age - describes age on 24 August 2021

Team	Event	Group stage						Quarter-final	Semi-final	Final / BM / Cl.	
Team	Event	Opposition Score	Opposition Score	Opposition Score	Opposition Score	Opposition Score	Rank	Opposition Score	Opposition Score	Opposition Score	Rank
Iran men's	Men's tournament	Australia; L 39–81	United States; L 41–65	Algeria; W 81–47	Great Britain; L 57–69	Germany; L 53–56	5	—N/a		South Korea; W 64–54	9

== See also ==
- Iran at the Paralympics
- Iran at the 2020 Summer Olympics
