= Iran at the 2018 Winter Paralympics =

- IPC code: IRI
- NPC: I. R. Iran National Paralympic Committee
- Website: www.paralympic.ir

in PyeongChang
- Competitors: 5 in 2 sports
- Flag bearer: Elaheh Gholi Fallah (opening)
- Medals: Gold 0 Silver 0 Bronze 0 Total 0

Winter Paralympics appearances (overview)
- 1998; 2002; 2006; 2010; 2014; 2018; 2022; 2026

Iran sent two competitors to the 2018 Winter Paralympics in Pyeongchang, South Korea: one man and one woman who competed in para-alpine skiing. Elaheh Gholi Fallah was announced as the flag bearer.

== Team ==
Iran's two competitors at the 2018 Winter Paralympics were one man and one woman both of whom competed in para-alpine skiing. Elaheh Gholi Fallah was announced as the flag bearer in late February. She is the first blind person to carry the flag for Iran at the Winter Paralympics.

The table below contains the list of members of people (called "Team Iran") that will be participating in the 2018 Games.

Team Iran
Name	Sport	Gender	Classification	Events	ref
Elaheh Gholi Fallah		female	VI		

== Results ==
=== Cross-country skiing ===
Men

Athlete	Class	Event	Qualification			Semifinal			Final		
Athlete	Class	Event	Real time	Calculated time	Rank	Real time	Calculated time	Rank	Real time	Calculated time	Rank
Aboulfazl Khatibi Mianaei	LW8	1.5km sprint classical, standing	4:54.13	4:27.66	21	—N/a					
Aboulfazl Khatibi Mianaei	LW8	10km classical, standing	—N/a						33:05.3	30:06.6	22

Women

Athlete	Class	Event	Qualification			Semifinal			Final		
Athlete	Class	Event	Real time	Calculated time	Rank	Real time	Calculated time	Rank	Real time	Calculated time	Rank
Elaheh Gholifallah; Guide: Farzaneh Rezasoltani	B1	1.5km sprint classical, visually impaired	10:39.78	9:23.01	11	—N/a					

=== Snowboarding ===
Banked slalom

Athlete	Event	Run 1	Run 2	Run 3	Best	Rank
Puriya Khaliltash	Men's banked slalom, UL	1:32.41	1:05.31	1:02.67	1:02.67	21
Hossein Solghani	Men's banked slalom, SB-LL2	1:11.84	DSQ	1:09.11	1:09.11	17
Sedigheh Rouzbeh	Women's banked slalom, SB-LL2	6:30.75	3:29.18	DNS	3:29.18	8

Snowboard cross

Athlete	Event	Seeding						1/8 final	Quarterfinal	Semifinal	Final	
Athlete	Event	Run 1		Run 2		Best	Seed	1/8 final	Quarterfinal	Semifinal	Final	
Athlete	Event	Time	Rank	Time	Rank	Best	Seed	Position	Position	Position	Position	Rank
Puriya Khaliltash	Men's snowboard cross, UL	1:16.33	20	1:12.37	20	1:12.37	20	did not advance				20
Andre Cintra	Men's snowboard cross, SB-LL2	1:26.18	19	1:17.95	16	1:17.95	17	did not advance				17
