= Iran at the 2010 Winter Paralympics =

- IPC code: IRI
- NPC: I.R. Iran National Paralympic Committee
- Website: www.paralympic.ir

in Vancouver
- Competitors: 1 in 1 sport
- Flag bearer: Sadegh Kalhor
- Medals Ranked —th: Gold 0 Silver 0 Bronze 0 Total 0

Winter Paralympics appearances (overview)
- 1998; 2002; 2006; 2010; 2014; 2018; 2022; 2026

Iran participated in the 2010 Winter Paralympics, in Vancouver, British Columbia, Canada. Only one athlete represented Iran in the 2010 Paralympics in alpine skiing.

== Competitors ==
Sport	Men	Women	Total
Alpine skiing	1		1
Total	1	0	1

== Results by event ==
=== Alpine skiing ===
Men's standing

Athlete	Event	Run 1	Run 2	Total	Rank
Sadegh Kalhor	Slalom	1:03.43	1:05.02	2:08.45	34
Sadegh Kalhor	Giant slalom	DNF	—	—	—
