= Powerlifting at the 2008 Summer Paralympics – Men's 100 kg =

Powerlifting - Men's 100 kg at the XIII Paralympic Games
- Venue: Beihang University Gymnasium
- Date: 16 September 2008
- Competitors: 11 from 11 nations

Medalists
1st place, gold medalist(s)		Qi Dong	China
2nd place, silver medalist(s)		Obioma Daleth Aligekwe	Nigeria
3rd place, bronze medalist(s)		Ali Sadeghzadeh	Iran

The men's 100 kg powerlifting event at the 2008 Summer Paralympics was contested on 16 September at the Beihang University Gymnasium in Beijing, China. This event was the second-heaviest of the men's powerlifting weight classes, limiting competitors to a maximum of 100 kilograms (220.5 lb) of body mass. Powerlifters were divided into two groups, A and B, with group B beginning their lifts at 13:00 and group A at 13:45.

As with all Paralympic powerlifting events, lifters competed in the bench press. Each athlete was allowed three attempts to bench press as much weight as possible. Athletes attempting to break a record were allowed a fourth attempt. For the attempt to be valid, the competitor must have lowered the weighted bar to his chest, held it motionless for a moment, then pressed the bar upwards until his arms were fully extended. If the competitor failed to meet these requirements or any other rule infraction was committed, the attempt was declared invalid by a team of three referees and the result struck from the record.

== Results ==
Rank	Name	Group	Body weight (kg)	Attempts (kg)				Result (kg)
Rank	Name	Group	Body weight (kg)	1	2	3	4	Result (kg)
1st place, gold medalist(s)	Qi Dong (CHN)	A	99.42	243.0 WR	245.0 WR	247.5 WR	~~248.5~~	247.5
2nd place, silver medalist(s)	Obioma Daleth Aligekwe (NGR)	A	98.69	~~230.0~~	235.0	245.0	~~248.0~~	245.0
3rd place, bronze medalist(s)	Ali Sadeghzadeh (IRI)	A	96.23	~~230.0~~	~~230.0~~	230.0	–	230.0
4	Abd Elmonem Salah Farag (EGY)	A	97.82	215.0	220.0	222.5	–	222.5
5	Damian Kulig (POL)	A	99.55	222.5	~~225.0~~	~~225.0~~	–	222.5
6	Dimitrios Anatolitis (GRE)	A	96.61	207.5	215.0	~~222.5~~	–	215.0
7	Sandor Sas (HUN)	B	98.67	~~195.0~~	195.0	~~207.5~~	–	195.0
8	Mehman Ramazanzade (AZE)	B	99.83	180.0	185.0	190.0	–	190.0
9	Levent Tutgun (TUR)	B	97.44	~~180.0~~	180.0	185.0	–	185.0
10	Ravil Diganshin (UZB)	B	94.21	170.0	~~190.0~~	~~190.0~~	–	170.0
11	Lubos Jancek (SVK)	B	98.09	147.5	~~155.0~~	~~155.0~~	–	147.5

Key: WR=World record
