= Iran at the 2006 Winter Paralympics =

- IPC code: IRI
- NPC: I.R. Iran National Paralympic Committee
- Website: www.paralympic.ir

in Turin
- Competitors: 1 in 1 sport
- Flag bearer: Sadegh Kalhor
- Medals Ranked –th: Gold 0 Silver 0 Bronze 0 Total 0

Winter Paralympics appearances (overview)
- 1998; 2002; 2006; 2010; 2014; 2018; 2022; 2026

Iran participated in the ninth Winter Paralympics in Turin, Italy.

== Competitors ==
Sport	Men	Women	Total
Alpine skiing	1		1
Total	1	0	1

== Results by event ==
=== Alpine skiing ===
Men's standing

Athlete	Event	Run 1	Run 2	Total	Rank
Sadegh Kalhor	Slalom	54.99	46.75	1:41.74	39
Sadegh Kalhor	Giant slalom	1:12.18	59.06	2:11.24	38
