= Iran at the 2002 Winter Paralympics =

- IPC code: IRI
- NPC: I.R. Iran National Paralympic Committee
- Website: www.paralympic.ir

in Salt Lake City
- Competitors: 1 in 1 sport
- Flag bearer: Sadegh Kalhor
- Medals Ranked –th: Gold 0 Silver 0 Bronze 0 Total 0

Winter Paralympics appearances (overview)
- 1998; 2002; 2006; 2010; 2014; 2018; 2022; 2026

Iran participated in the eighth Winter Paralympics in Salt Lake City, United States.

== Competitors ==
Sport	Men	Women	Total
Alpine skiing	1		1
Total	1	0	1

== Results by event ==
=== Alpine skiing ===
Men

Athlete	Event	1st run	2nd run	Real time	Result	Rank
Sadegh Kalhor	Slalom LW2	54.06	51.85	1:45.91	1:45.91	14
Sadegh Kalhor	Giant slalom LW2	1:15.65	1:18.06	2:46.66	2:33.71	12
Sadegh Kalhor	Super-G LW2	1:34.35			1:26.92	16
