= Iran at the 2014 Winter Paralympics =

- The flag of Iran
- IPC code: IRI
- NPC: I.R. Iran National Paralympic Committee
- Website: www.paralympic.ir

in Sochi
- Competitors: 1 in 1 sport
- Flag bearer: Sadegh Kalhor
- Medals: Gold 0 Silver 0 Bronze 0 Total 0

Winter Paralympics appearances (overview)
- 1998; 2002; 2006; 2010; 2014; 2018; 2022; 2026

Iran sent a delegation to compete at the 2014 Winter Paralympics in Sochi, Russia from 7–16 March 2014. This was Iran's fifth time participating in a Winter Paralympic Games. The Iranian delegation consisted of a single alpine skier, Sadegh Kalhor, who had his leg amputated in a skiing accident as a teenager. In the standing slalom event, he finished in 20th place.

== Background ==
Iran first joined Paralympic competition at the 1988 Summer Paralympics, and have appeared at every Summer Paralympic Games since. The nation sent a delegation to a Winter Paralympics for the first time at the 1998 Winter Paralympics, and, likewise, has sent a delegation to every edition since. The 2014 Winter Paralympics were held from 7–16 March 2014, in Sochi, Russia; 45 countries and 547 athletes took part in the multi-sport event. Sadegh Kalhor, competing in his fifth winter games, was the only athlete sent to Sochi by Iran, as he had been for the three immediately preceding Winter Paralympics; only once, in the 1998 Winter Paralympics, had Iran sent a second competitor. Kalhor was chosen as the Iranian flag-bearer for the parade of nations during the opening ceremony, but the delegation left before the closing ceremony.

== Disability classification ==
Every participant at the Paralympics has their disability grouped into one of five disability categories: amputation, the condition may be congenital or sustained through injury or illness; cerebral palsy; wheelchair athletes, though there is often overlap between this and other categories; visual impairment, including blindness; and Les Autres, any physical disability that does not fall strictly under one of the other categories, like dwarfism or multiple sclerosis. Each Paralympic sport then has its own classifications, dependent upon the specific physical demands of competition. Events are given a code, made of numbers and letters, describing the type of event and classification of the athletes competing. Events with "B" in the code are for athletes with visual impairment, codes LW1 to LW9 are for athletes who stand to compete and LW10 to LW12 are for athletes who compete sitting down. Alpine skiing events grouped athletes into separate competitions for sitting, standing and visually impaired athletes.

== Alpine skiing ==
Sadegh Kalhor suffered a skiing accident at the age of 18 that required the amputation of his right leg. The 2014 Paralympics were his fifth consecutive Games, and he was 35 years old at the time. As a leg amputee, he is classified as LW2, and competes in a standing position. LW2 classified athletes "have a significant impairment in one leg" and ski with only one ski. On 13 March, 51 participants started the standing slalom, including Kalhor. He completed the first run in 58.07 seconds, and the second run in 1 minute and 3.17 seconds. His total time, which was the sum of his two run times, was therefore 2 minutes and 1.24 seconds, placing him in 20th position out of 35 competitors who finished both legs of the race. The gold medal was won by Alexey Bugaev of Russia in a time of 1 minute and 38.97 seconds; the silver was taken by Vincent Gauthier-Manuel of France, and the bronze by Alexander Alyabyev, also of Russia.

Athlete	Event	Run 1			Run 2			Final/Total		
Athlete	Event	Time	Diff	Rank	Time	Diff	Rank	Time	Diff	Rank
Sadegh Kalhor	Slalom, standing	58.07	+10.38	28	1:03.17	+11.89	23	2:01.24	+22.27	20

== See also ==
- Iran at the Paralympics
- Iran at the 2014 Winter Olympics
