= Iran at the 2022 Winter Paralympics =

- Flag of Iran
- IPC code: IRI
- NPC: I. R. Iran National Paralympic Committee
- Website: www.paralympic.ir

in Beijing, China 4 March 2022 – 13 March 2022
- Competitors: 4 (2 men and 2 women)
- Flag bearer: Elaheh Gholi Fallah
- Medals: Gold 0 Silver 0 Bronze 0 Total 0

Winter Paralympics appearances (overview)
- 1998; 2002; 2006; 2010; 2014; 2018; 2022; 2026

Iran competed at the 2022 Winter Paralympics in Beijing, China which took place between 4–13 March 2022.

Elaheh Gholi Fallah was the flag bearer for Iran during the opening ceremony.

== Competitors ==
The following is the list of number of competitors participating at the Games per sport/discipline.

| Sport | Men | Women | Total |
|---|---|---|---|
| Cross-country skiing | 1 | 1 | 2 |
| Snowboarding | 1 | 1 | 2 |
| Total | 2 | 2 | 4 |

== Cross-country skiing ==
Iran competed in cross-country skiing.

| Athlete | Class | Event | Qualification | | Semifinal | | Final | |
| Athlete | Class | Event | Time | Rank | Time | Rank | Time | Rank |
|---|---|---|---|---|---|---|---|---|
| Aboulfazl Khatibi Mianaei | LW8 | Men's sprint, standing | 3:19.71 | 23 | Did not advance | | | |
| Aboulfazl Khatibi Mianaei | LW8 | Men's middle distance, standing | —N/a | | | | 44:47.7 | 20 |
| Elaheh Gholifallah; Guide: Farzaneh Rezasoltani | B1 | Women's sprint, visually impaired | 7:09.45 | 10 | Did not advance | | | |

== Snowboarding ==
Iran competed in snowboarding.

Slalom

| Athlete | Event | Run 1 | Run 2 | Best | Rank |
|---|---|---|---|---|---|
| Hossein Solghani | Men's banked slalom, SB-LL2 | 1:30.41 | 1:29.31 | 1:29.31 | 25 |
| Sedigheh Rouzbeh | Women's banked slalom, SB-LL2 | 3:36.49 | DNS | 3:36.49 | 13 |

== See also ==
- Iran at the Paralympics
- Iran at the 2022 Winter Olympics
