= Powerlifting at the 2012 Summer Paralympics – Men's 100 kg =

Powerlifting – Men's 100 kg at the XIV Paralympic Games
- Venue: ExCeL London
- Date: 5 September 2012
- Competitors: 12 from 12 nations
- Winning lift: 249.0 kg

Medalists
1st place, gold medalist(s)		Mohamed Eldib	Egypt
2nd place, silver medalist(s)		Qi Dong	China
3rd place, bronze medalist(s)		Ali Sadeghzadeh	Iran

The men's 100 kg powerlifting event at the 2012 Summer Paralympics was contested on 5 September at ExCeL London.

== Records ==
Prior to the competition, the existing world and Paralympic records were as follows.

World record	248.0 kg	Mohamed Eldib (EGY)	Dubai, United Arab Emirates	26 February 2012
Paralympic record	247.5 kg	Qi Dong (CHN)	Beijing, China	16 September 2008

== Results ==
Rank	Name	Group	Body weight (kg)	Attempts (kg)				Result (kg)
Rank	Name	Group	Body weight (kg)	1	2	3	4	Result (kg)
1st place, gold medalist(s)	Mohamed Eldib (EGY)	A	93.09	237.0	244.0	249.0	–	249.0 WR
2nd place, silver medalist(s)	Qi Dong (CHN)	A	96.07	242.0	~~249.0~~	~~250.0~~	–	242.0
3rd place, bronze medalist(s)	Ali Sadeghzadeh (IRI)	A	99.65	231.0	235.0	~~245.0~~	–	235.0
4	Elshan Huseynov (AZE)	A	99.00	230.0	~~234.0~~	~~236.0~~	–	230.0
5	Obioma Aligekwe (NGR)	A	98.62	225.0	~~232.0~~	–	–	225.0
6	Damian Kulig (POL)	A	98.88	204.0	206.0	~~226.0~~	–	206.0
7	Anton Kriukov (UKR)	B	97.92	195.0	200.0	205.0	–	205.0
8	Bassam Al Hawal (KSA)	B	98.93	185.0	195.0	~~201.0~~	–	195.0
9	Ruben Soroseb (NAM)	B	96.88	190.0	~~195.0~~	~~195.0~~	–	190.0
10	Mario Hochberg (GER)	B	99.09	150.0	160.0	170.0	–	170.0
–	Sandor Sas (HUN)	B	99.36	~~195.0~~	~~196.0~~	~~203.0~~	–	NMR

Key: PR=Paralympic record; WR=World record; NMR=No marks recorded
