= Iran at the 1998 Winter Paralympics =

- IPC code: IRI
- NPC: I.R. Iran National Paralympic Committee
- Website: www.paralympic.ir

in Nagano
- Competitors: 2 in 1 sport
- Medals Ranked –th: Gold 0 Silver 0 Bronze 0 Total 0

Winter Paralympics appearances (overview)
- 1998; 2002; 2006; 2010; 2014; 2018; 2022; 2026

Iran participated in the seventh Winter Paralympics in Nagano, Japan.

== Competitors ==
Sport	Men	Women	Total
Alpine skiing	2		2
Total	2	0	2

== Results by event ==
=== Alpine skiing ===
Men

Athlete	Event	Real time	Result	Rank
Ramezan Ali Jeiroudi	Slalom LW2	Did not finish		
Ramezan Ali Jeiroudi	Giant slalom LW2	Did not finish		
Ramezan Ali Jeiroudi	Super-G LW2	1:49.32	1:40.04	26
Sadegh Kalhor	Slalom LW2	Did not finish		
Sadegh Kalhor	Giant slalom LW2	Did not finish		
Sadegh Kalhor	Super-G LW2	1:33.36	1:25.43	20
