= Amrollah Dehghani =

Iranian Paralympic powerlifter

Sport
- Country: Iran
- Sport: Paralympic powerlifting
Medal record
Paralympic Games
Gold medal – first place	2000 Sydney	100 kg

Amrollah Dehghani is an Iranian Paralympic powerlifter. He represented Iran at the 1996 Summer Paralympics and at the 2000 Summer Paralympics and he won the gold medal in the men's 100 kg event in 2000.
