= Qi Dong =

Chinese Paralympic powerlifter

Personal information
- Nationality: Chinese
- Born: Anshan, China

Sport
- Sport: powerlifting
Medal record
Powerlifting
Representing China
Summer Paralympics
Gold medal – first place	2008 Beijing	Men's 100 kg
Silver medal – second place	2012 London	Men's 100 kg
Silver medal – second place	2016 Rio de Janeiro	Men's 97 kg

Qi Dong is a Chinese powerlifter. He won the silver medal at the Men's 97 kg event at the 2016 Summer Paralympics, with 233 kilograms.
