= Athletics at the 2008 Summer Paralympics – Men's discus throw F37–38 =

Men's Discus F37/38 at the XIII Paralympic Games
- Venue: Beijing National Stadium
- Dates: 14 September
- Competitors: 10 from 8 nations
- Winning distance: 45.62

Medalists
1st place, gold medalist(s)		Javad Hardani	Iran
2nd place, silver medalist(s)		Mykola Zhabnyak	Ukraine
3rd place, bronze medalist(s)		Xia Dong	China

The men's discus F37/38 event at the 2008 Summer Paralympics took place at the Beijing National Stadium on 14 September. There was a single round of competition; after the first three throws, only the top eight had 3 further throws.

Rank	Athlete	Nationality	Class	1	2	3	4	5	6	Best	Points	Notes
1st place, gold medalist(s)	Javad Hardani	Iran	F38	41.72	41.53	45.62	41.56	43.68	-	45.62	1024	PR
2nd place, silver medalist(s)	Mykola Zhabnyak	Ukraine	F37	44.62	48.33	x	52.00	x	x	52.00	1010	WR
3rd place, bronze medalist(s)	Xia Dong	China	F37	46.23	49.12	46.10	50.15	51.65	x	51.65	1003	SB
4	Haider Ali	Pakistan	F38	x	41.89	43.79	43.95	x	42.76	43.95	986	
5	Tomasz Blatkiewicz	Poland	F37	47.32	47.15	49.44	49.72	x	49.71	49.72	966	
6	Mohamed Mohamed Ramadan	Egypt	F37	49.60	47.77	46.08	44.18	x	48.02	49.60	964	SB
7	Hamdi Warfili	Tunisia	F38	39.47	x	39.32	38.58	38.51	37.77	39.47	886	
8	Thomas Loosch	Germany	F38	32.57	39.40	38.08	x	x	34.39	39.40	884	
9	Robert Chyra	Poland	F37	43.03	43.26	44.75	-	-	-	44.75	869	
10	Zhang Xuelong	China	F37	43.61	x	x	-	-	-	43.61	847	

WR = World Record. PR = Paralympic Record. SB = Seasonal Best.
