= Amir Khosravani =

Iranian Paralympic athlete

Personal information
- Native name: امیر خسروانی
- Full name: Amir Khosravani
- Nationality: Iranian
- Born: 3 March 1994 (age 32) Borazjan
- Website: Official Instagram Profile

Sport
- Sport: Paralympic athletics
- Event: Long jump
Medal record
Men's para-athletics
Representing Iran
Paralympic Games
Gold medal – first place	2020 Tokyo	Long jump T12
World Championships
Silver medal – second place	2023 Paris	Long jump T12
Asian Para Games
Silver medal – second place	2022 Hangzhou	Long jump T12
Bronze medal – third place	2018 Jakarta	Long jump T12
Islamic Solidarity Games
Gold medal – first place	2017 Baku	4×100 m relay T11/T12/T13

Amir Khosravani (Persian: امیر خسروانی; born 3 March 1994) is an Iranian Paralympic athlete.

== Career ==
He represented Iran at the 2020 Summer Paralympics in Tokyo, Japan, and won the gold medal in the men's long jump T12 event.

He won the silver medal in the men's long jump T12 event at the 2023 World Para Athletics Championships held in Paris, France.
