= Powerlifting at the 2008 Summer Paralympics – Men's 75 kg =

Athletic competition

Powerlifting - Men's 75 kg at the XIII Paralympic Games
- Venue: Beihang University Gymnasium
- Date: 14 September 2008
- Competitors: 12 from 12 nations

Medalists
1st place, gold medalist(s)		Liu Lei	China
2nd place, silver medalist(s)		Majid Farzin	Iran
3rd place, bronze medalist(s)		Mu'taz Aljuneidi	Jordan

The men's 75 kg powerlifting event at the 2008 Summer Paralympics was contested on 14 September at the Beihang University Gymnasium in Beijing, China. This event was the fifth-heaviest of the men's powerlifting weight classes, limiting competitors to a maximum of 75 kilograms (165.3 lb) of body mass. Powerlifters were divided into two groups, A and B, with group B beginning their lifts at 16:30 and group A at 17:15.

As with all Paralympic powerlifting events, lifters competed in the bench press. Each athlete was allowed three attempts to bench press as much weight as possible. Athletes attempting to break a record were allowed a fourth attempt. For the attempt to be valid, the competitor must have lowered the weighted bar to his chest, held it motionless for a moment, then pressed the bar upwards until his arms were fully extended. If the competitor failed to meet these requirements or any other rule infraction was committed, the attempt was declared invalid by a team of three referees and the result struck from the record.

== Results ==
Rank	Name	Group	Body weight (kg)	Attempts (kg)				Result (kg)
Rank	Name	Group	Body weight (kg)	1	2	3	4	Result (kg)
1st place, gold medalist(s)	Liu Lei (CHN)	A	70.44	220.0	222.5	225.0	–	225.0
2nd place, silver medalist(s)	Majid Farzin (IRI)	A	73.09	207.5	212.5	~~227.5~~	–	212.5
3rd place, bronze medalist(s)	Mu'taz Aljuneidi (JOR)	A	74.55	205.0	210.0	~~212.5~~	–	210.0
4	Mohamed Sobhy Elelfat (EGY)	A	73.00	200.0	205.0	~~210.0~~	–	205.0
5	Porfirio Arredondo (MEX)	A	74.26	197.5	~~207.5~~	~~207.5~~	–	197.5
6	Hussain Alnoweser (KSA)	A	72.71	~~195.0~~	195.0	~~210.0~~	–	195.0
7	Nikolaos Gkountanis (GRE)	A	74.18	190.0	~~197.5~~	~~197.5~~	–	190.0
8	Hideki Odo (JPN)	B	74.68	175.0	182.5	187.5	–	187.5
9	Ali Jawad (GBR)	B	72.50	182.5	~~187.5~~	~~187.5~~	–	182.5
10	Piotr Szymeczek (POL)	B	73.77	180.0	~~185.0~~	~~185.0~~	–	180.0
11	Bong Duk-Hwan (KOR)	B	74.58	170.0	~~175.0~~	~~175.0~~	–	170.0
12	Steini Solvason (ISL)	B	72.53	115.0	~~125.0~~	~~125.0~~	–	115.0
