= Powerlifting at the 2020 Summer Paralympics – Men's 80 kg =

Powerlifting – Men's 80 kg at the XVI Paralympic Games
- Venue: Tokyo International Forum
- Date: 28 August 2021
- Competitors: 9 from 9 nations

Medalists
1st place, gold medalist(s)		Rouhollah Rostami	Iran
2nd place, silver medalist(s)		Gu Xiaofei	China
3rd place, bronze medalist(s)		Mohamed Elelfat	Egypt

The men's 80 kg powerlifting event at the 2020 Summer Paralympics was contested on 28 August at Tokyo International Forum.

== Records ==
There are twenty powerlifting events, corresponding to ten weight classes each for men and women. Prior to this competition, the existing world and Paralympic records were as follows.

World Record	Rouhollah Rostami (IRI)	241.0 kg	Bangkok, Thailand	7 May 2021
Paralympic Record	Majid Farzin (IRI)	240.0 kg	Rio de Janeiro, Brazil	12 September 2016

== Results ==
Rank	Name	Body weight (kg)	Attempts (kg)				Result (kg)
Rank	Name	Body weight (kg)	1	2	3	4	Result (kg)
1st place, gold medalist(s)	Rouhollah Rostami (IRI)	79.39	225	228	234	~~242~~	234
2nd place, silver medalist(s)	Gu Xiaofei (CHN)	78.36	211	215	~~228~~	–	215
3rd place, bronze medalist(s)	Mohamed Elelfat (EGY)	79.17	207	212	~~216~~	–	212
4	Francisco Palomeque (COL)	78.31	190	196	200	–	200
5	Ahmad Razm Azar (GEO)	78.11	193	198	~~199~~	–	198
6	Donato Telesca (ITA)	78.30	~~193~~	193	~~199~~	–	193
7	Gkremislav Moysiadis (GRE)	76.19	181	~~186~~	187	–	187
8	Ailton Bento de Souza (BRA)	78.91	~~181~~	~~182~~	182	–	182
9	Yurii Babynets (UKR)	78.93	175	~~185~~	~~188~~	–	175
