= Athletics at the 2008 Summer Paralympics – Men's discus throw F42 =

The Men's Discus Throw F42 had its Final held on September 16 at 9:30.

== Medalists ==
| Gold | Fanie Lombard; South Africa |
| Silver | Mehrdad Karamzadeh; Iran |
| Bronze | Wang Lezheng; China |

== Results ==
| Place | Athlete | 1 | 2 | 3 | 4 | 5 | 6 | Best |
|---|---|---|---|---|---|---|---|---|
| 1 | Fanie Lombard (RSA) | 44.70 | 46.75 | x | 44.87 | 44.81 | x | 46.75 |
| 2 | Mehrdad Karamzadeh (IRI) | 40.81 | 41.80 | 42.93 | 42.35 | 44.13 | 44.74 | 44.74 |
| 3 | Wang Lezheng (CHN) | 41.98 | 42.93 | 41.79 | 40.69 | 42.95 | 42.02 | 42.95 |
| 4 | Matt Brown (USA) | 40.72 | 39.48 | 39.47 | 39.20 | 42.25 | x | 42.25 |
| 5 | Gino de Keersmaeker (BEL) | 40.00 | 39.83 | 40.77 | 40.21 | 41.84 | 40.21 | 41.84 |
| 6 | Marinos Fylachtos (GRE) | 40.49 | 38.49 | 41.16 | 39.01 | 37.27 | 36.84 | 41.16 |
| 7 | Dechko Ovcharov (BUL) | 39.25 | 36.20 | 38.49 | 38.33 | 37.49 | 37.16 | 39.25 |
| 8 | Viktar Khilmonchyk (BLR) | 34.79 | 38.58 | 38.89 | 35.81 | 38.78 | 38.17 | 38.89 |
| 9 | Leszek Cmikiewicz (POL) | 37.22 | x | 36.67 | | | | 37.22 |
| 10 | Algirdas Tatulis (LTU) | x | 35.38 | x | | | | 35.38 |
