= Aref Khosravinia =

Iranian Paralympic athlete

Sport
- Country: Iran
- Sport: Para-athletics
- Event: Discus throw
Medal record
Paralympic Games
Gold medal – first place	2000 Sydney	Discus throw F57

Aref Khosravinia is an Iranian Paralympic athlete. He represented Iran at the 2000 Summer Paralympics in Sydney, Australia and he won the gold medal in the men's discus throw F57 event.
