= Mohsen Amoo-Aghaei =

Iranian Paralympic athlete

Medal record

Paralympic athletics

Representing Iran

Paralympic Games
Bronze medal – third place	2004 Athens	Shot Put - F33-34

Mohsen Amooaghaei is a paralympic athlete from Iran competing mainly in category F33-34 shot put events.

He competed in the 2004 Summer Paralympics winning a bronze medal in the F33-34 shot put.
