= Mehrdad Karamzadeh =

Iranian Paralympic athlete

Personal information
- Born: 20 September 1970 (age 55)

Sport
- Sport: Paralympic athletics
- Disability class: F42
Medal record
Paralympic athletics
Representing Iran
Paralympic Games
Silver medal – second place	2008 Beijing	Discus throw F42
Silver medal – second place	2012 London	Discus throw F42
Bronze medal – third place	2004 Athens	Shot put F42
World Para Athletics Championships
Gold medal – first place	2006 Assen	Shot put F42
Silver medal – second place	2002 Lille	Shot put F42
Asian Para Games
Gold medal – first place	2010 Guangzhou	Discus throw F42
Silver medal – second place	2014 Incheon	Discus throw F42
Bronze medal – third place	2014 Incheon	Shot put F42

Mehrdad Karam Zadeh (born 20 September 1970) is a Paralympian athlete from Iran competing mainly in category F42 shot put and discus events.

Mehrdad competed in the F42 shot put at the 2004 Summer Paralympics in Athens where he won a bronze medal. Four years later at the 2008 Summer Paralympics in Beijing he failed to medal in the shot put but won a silver medal in the F42 discus. In the London 2012 Paralympic Games, Mehrdad had another successful day by producing a silver medal in the F42 discus for Iran.
