= Vahab Saalabi =

Iranian Paralympic athlete

Medal record

Men's para-athletics

Representing Iran

Paralympic Games
Bronze medal – third place	2000 Sydney	Javelin throw F42
Bronze medal – third place	2004 Athens	Javelin throw F42

World Championships
Gold medal – first place	1998 Birmingham	Javelin throw F42
Silver medal – second place	2002 Villeneuve d'Ascq	Javelin throw F42

Vahab Saalabi is a paralympic athlete from Iran competing mainly in category F42 javelin events.

Vahab has competed at two paralympics first in 2000 and then again in 2004 on both occasions he won the bronze medal in the F42 javelin.
