= Ali Sadeghzadeh =

Iranian Paralympic powerlifter

Ali Sadeghzade
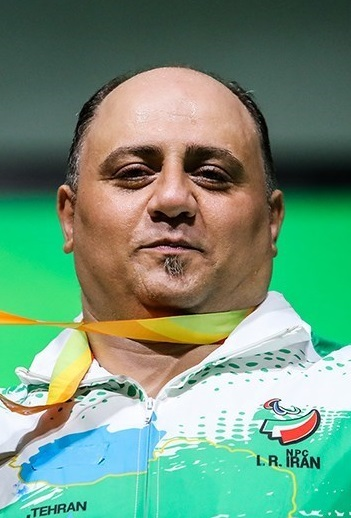

Personal information
- Nationality: Iranian
- Born: November 30, 1978 (age 47) Ray, Iran
- Weight: 99.65 kg (219.7 lb)

Sport
- Sport: Paralympic powerlifting
Medal record
Men's Paralympic powerlifting
Representing Iran
Paralympic Games
Bronze medal – third place	2008 Beijing	100 kg
Bronze medal – third place	2012 London	100 kg
Bronze medal – third place	2016 Rio de Janeiro	107 kg
IPC Powerlifting World Championships
Silver medal – second place	2014 Dubai	107 kg
Bronze medal – third place	2010 Kuala Lumpur	90 kg
Asian Para Games
Gold medal – first place	2014 Incheon	107 kg

Ali Sadeghzadeh (born 30 November 1978) is an Iranian powerlifter. At the 2012 Summer Paralympics he won bronze medal at the -100 kg category, with 235 kg. He also participated at the 2016 Summer Paralympics, being awarded the bronze medal in the powerlifting competition.
