= Javad Hardani =

Iranian Paralympic athlete (born 1984)

Personal information
- Born: 22 March 1984 (age 42) Ahvaz, Iran
Medal record
Men's para athletics
Representing Iran
Paralympic Games
Gold medal – first place	2008 Beijing	Discus throw – F37/38
Gold medal – first place	2012 London	Discus throw – F37/38
Silver medal – second place	2004 Athens	Discus throw – F38
Bronze medal – third place	2008 Beijing	Javelin throw – F37/38
Bronze medal – third place	2012 London	Shot put – F37/38
Bronze medal – third place	2016 Rio	Shot put – F38
Bronze medal – third place	2016 Rio	Javellin throw – F38
World Championships
Gold medal – first place	2006 Assen	Discus throw F38
Silver medal – second place	2011 Christchurch	Javelin throw F37-38
Silver medal – second place	2017 London	Shot put – F38
Bronze medal – third place	2006 Assen	Shot put F38
Bronze medal – third place	2011 Christchurch	Discus throw F37/38
Asian Para Games
Gold medal – first place	2010 Guangzhou	Discus throw F37-38
Bronze medal – third place	2010 Guangzhou	Javelin throw F37-38
Bronze medal – third place	2018 Jakarta	Javelin throw F37/38

Javad Hardani (born 22 March 1984) is a Paralympic athlete from Iran. He competes in throwing events, and is classified F38, a class for athletes with cerebral palsy.

Javad competed in the 2008 Summer Paralympics where he won the F37/38 discus, and finished third in F37/38 javelin. In 2012, at the London Paralympic Games, he succeeded in winning a gold medal in the F37/38 discus, breaking the F38 world record in the process.
