= Avaz Azmoudeh =

Iranian Paralympic athlete

Medal record

Paralympic athletics

Representing Iran

Paralympic Games
Gold medal – first place	2000 Sydney	Javelin Throw - F54
Silver medal – second place	1992 Barcelona	Javelin Throw - THW4
Bronze medal – third place	2004 Athens	Javelin Throw - F54

Avez Azmoudeh is a paralympic athlete from Iran competing mainly in category F54 javelin events.

Avaz competed in three Paralympics, first in 1992 in Barcelona, where, as well as competing in the THW4 discus, he won a silver medal in the javelin. Having missed the 1996 games, he returned in 2000 where he won the gold medal while competing in only the F54 javelin. He made his third appearance in the 2004 Summer Paralympics where he again competed in just the javelin but could only manage bronze
