= Mokhtar Nourafshan =

Iranian Paralympic athlete (1966/1967 – 2024)

Medal record

Paralympic athletics

Representing Iran

Paralympic Games
Gold medal – first place	1988 Seoul	Discus Throw - 3
Gold medal – first place	1996 Atlanta	Javelin Throw - F53
Gold medal – first place	2000 Sydney	Discus Throw - F54
Gold medal – first place	2000 Sydney	Shot Put - F54
Silver medal – second place	1996 Atlanta	Discus Throw - F53
Silver medal – second place	1996 Atlanta	Shot Put - F53
Bronze medal – third place	2004 Athens	Discus Throw - F55

Mokhtar Nourafshan (1966/1967 – 31 July 2024) was an Iranian paralympic athlete competing mainly in category F53 throwing events.

== Biography ==
Nourafshan first competed in the Paralympics in 1988 where he threw the javelin and discus, winning the gold medal in the latter. He missed the 1992 games but returned to the 1996 Summer Paralympics to win gold in the F53 javelin and silver in the F53 discus and shot put. He didn't attempt to defend his javelin title in the 2000 Summer Paralympics but did win both the discus and shot put titles in the F54 class. In 2004, he returned to the javelin but failed to medal in the F55-F56 joint class and won bronze in the F55 discus.

Nourafshan died of a kidney infection in Tehran, on 31 July 2024, at the age of 57.
