= Mohammad Reza Mirzaei =

Iranian Paralympic athlete

Medal record

Paralympic athletics

Representing Iran

Paralympic Games
Gold medal – first place	1996 Atlanta	Javelin Throw – F56
Gold medal – first place	2000 Sydney	Javelin Throw – F57
Gold medal – first place	2004 Athens	Javelin Throw – F57
Gold medal – first place	2008 Beijing	Javelin Throw – F57/58

Mohammad Reza Mirzaei Jaberi is a retired Paralympian athlete from Iran competing mainly in category F57 javelin events.

Mohammad Reza has competed in four Paralympics and has won the javelin in all four. His first Paralympics came in Atlanta in 1996 where he won the F56 class, in 2000 and 2004 he won the F57 class then in Beijing in 2008 he won the combined F57/58 class. In 2021, a bust of Jaberi (and eight other Olympic medalists) was unveiled at the Tehran hall of fame.
