= Mohammad Sadeghi Mehryar =

Iranian Paralympic athlete

Medal record

Paralympic athletics

Representing Iran

Paralympic Games
Gold medal – first place	2000 Sydney	Discus Throw - F56
Gold medal – first place	2004 Athens	Discus Throw - F56
Silver medal – second place	1996 Atlanta	Discus Throw - F55
Silver medal – second place	1996 Atlanta	Shot Put - F55

Mohammad Sadeghimehryar is a paralympic athlete from Iran competing mainly in category F556 discus and shot put events.

Mohammad has competed in five Paralympics. His first was in 1988 where he competed in the class 4 pentathlon, in 1996 he competed in the PW 3-4 pentathlon and the THW6 shot put and discus. His breakthrough came in 1996 Summer Paralympics where he won silver in both the F55 discus and shot put. In 2000, he couldn't manage a medal in the shot put but improved to gold in the F56 discus which he successfully defended as his only event in 2004 Summer Paralympics.
