= I. R. Iran National Paralympic Committee =

National Paralympic Committee of Iran

IR Iran National Paralympic Committee

National Paralympic Committee
- Country: Iran
- Code: IRI
- Created: 5 February 2001
- Headquarters: Tehran Province, Northern, Q9JV+JV4 District 3, Tehran, Ayatollah Hashemi Rafsanjani Highway, Seoul St
- President: Ghafour Karegari
- Website: www.paralympic.ir/en/home

The Paralympic Committee of Iran (Persian: کمیته ملی پارالمپیک ایران) is the body responsible for selecting athletes to represent Iran at the Paralympic Games and other international athletic meets and for managing the Iranian teams at the events.

== Presidents ==
President	Term
Mahmoud Khosravivafa	2001–2022
Ghafour Karegari	2022–Acting

== See also ==
- National Olympic Committee of the Islamic Republic of Iran
