= Powerlifting at the 2012 Summer Paralympics =

Powerlifting at the XIV Paralympic Games
- Venue: ExCeL London
- Dates: 30 August – 5 September 2012
- Competitors: 194 from 61 nations

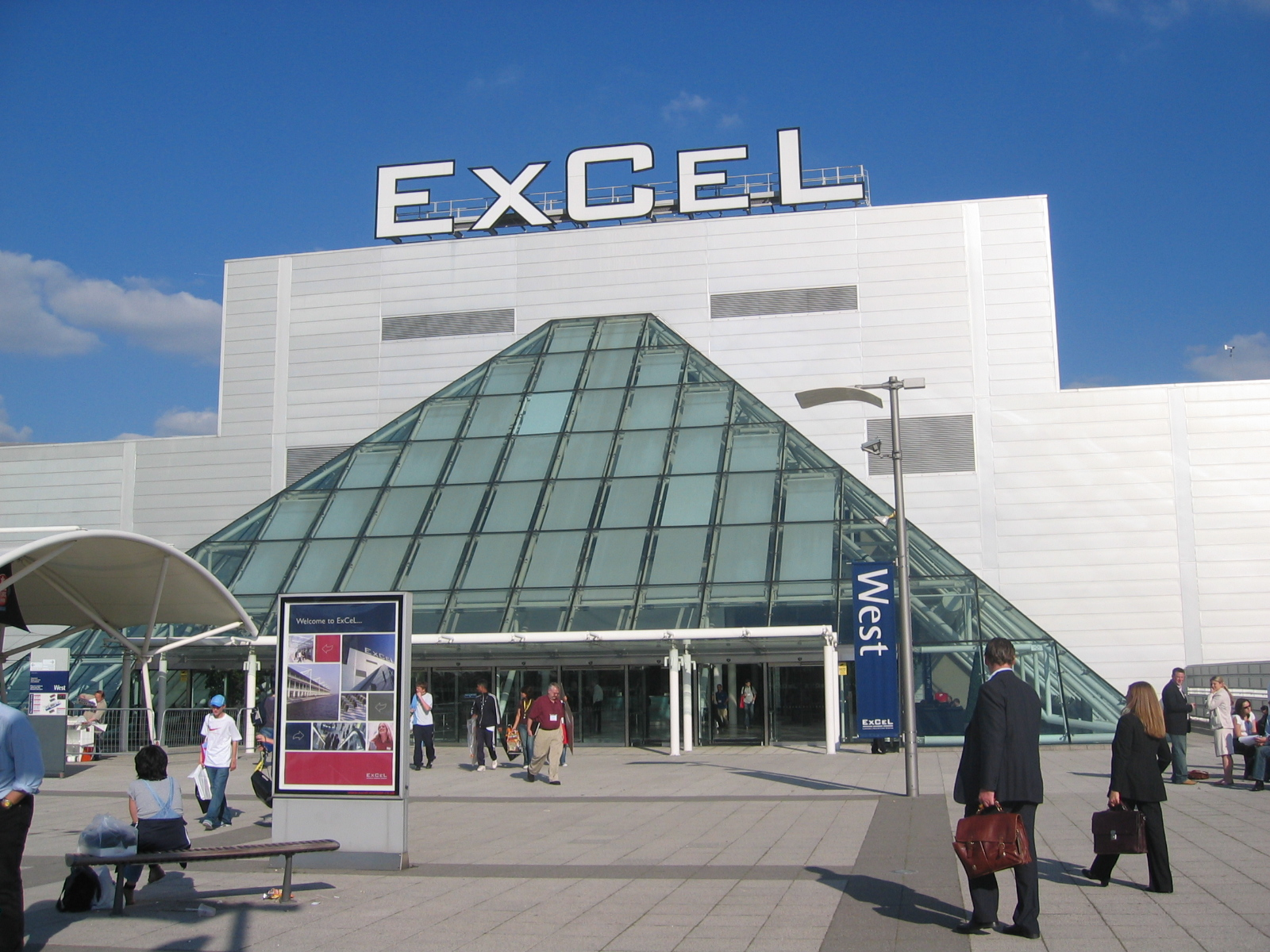
ExCeL Exhibition Centre hosted the powerlifting competitions.

Powerlifting at the 2012 Summer Paralympics was held at ExCeL London from 30 August to 5 September, with a maximum of 200 athletes (120 men and 80 women), competing in 20 events. According to the classification rules of the International Federation for Powerlifting athletes which cannot participate in weightlifting events because of a physical impairment affecting their legs or hips are deemed eligible to compete in powerlifting events at the Paralympics.

== Events ==
There were twenty powerlifting events, corresponding to ten weight classes each for men and women.

- Men's 48 kg
- Men's 52 kg
- Men's 56 kg
- Men's 60 kg
- Men's 67.5 kg
- Men's 75 kg
- Men's 82.5 kg
- Men's 90 kg
- Men's 100 kg
- Men's +100 kg

- Women's 40 kg
- Women's 44 kg
- Women's 48 kg
- Women's 52 kg
- Women's 56 kg
- Women's 60 kg
- Women's 67.5 kg
- Women's 75 kg
- Women's 82.5 kg
- Women's +82.5 kg

== Participating nations ==
There were 114 male and 80 female competitors.

- Afghanistan (1)
- Argentina (1)
- Armenia (1)
- Australia (2)
- Azerbaijan (2)
- Belarus (1)
- Brazil (4)
- Cambodia (1)
- China (16)
- Chinese Taipei (2)
- Colombia (1)
- Cuba (2)
- Ecuador (1)
- Egypt (15)
- France (2)
- Georgia (1)
- Germany (1)
- Ghana (1)
- Great Britain (5)
- Greece (2)
- Hungary (2)
- India (3)
- Indonesia (1)
- Iran (8)
- Iraq (6)
- Ireland (1)
- Japan (3)
- Jordan (2)
- Kazakhstan (2)
- Kyrgyzstan (1)
- Laos (1)
- Liberia (1)
- Libya (1)
- Malaysia (3)
- Mexico (6)
- Moldova (2)
- Morocco (3)
- Namibia (1)
- Nigeria (16)
- Oman (1)
- Papua New Guinea (1)
- Philippines (3)
- Poland (6)
- Russia (13)
- Rwanda (1)
- Saudi Arabia (1)
- Slovakia (1)
- South Korea (4)
- Spain (1)
- Syria (3)
- Tajikistan (1)
- Thailand (4)
- Turkey (6)
- Turkmenistan (4)
- Ukraine (6)
- United Arab Emirates (2)
- United States (2)
- Uzbekistan (2)
- Venezuela (1)
- Vietnam (4)

== Medal summary ==
=== Medal table ===
Rank	Nation	Gold	Silver	Bronze	Total
1	Nigeria (NGR)	6	5	1	12
2	Egypt (EGY)	4	3	4	11
3	Iran (IRI)	4	1	1	6
4	China (CHN)	3	6	6	15
5	Turkey (TUR)	1	1	1	3
6	Mexico (MEX)	1	0	1	2
7	France (FRA)	1	0	0	1
8	Russia (RUS)	0	3	1	4
9	Iraq (IRQ)	0	1	0	1
10	Chinese Taipei (TPE)	0	0	1	1
10	Great Britain (GBR)	0	0	1	1
10	Greece (GRE)	0	0	1	1
10	South Korea (KOR)	0	0	1	1
10	Ukraine (UKR)	0	0	1	1
Totals (14 entries)		20	20	20	60

=== Women's events ===
Event	Gold	Silver	Bronze
40 kg	Nazmiye Muslu; Turkey	Zhe Cui; China	Zoe Newson; Great Britain
44 kg	Ivory Nwokorie; Nigeria	Çiğdem Dede; Turkey	Lidiia Soloviova; Ukraine
48 kg	Esther Oyema; Nigeria	Olesya Lafina; Russia	Shi Shanshan; China
52 kg	Joy Onaolapo; Nigeria	Tamara Podpalnaya; Russia	Xiao Cuijuan; China
56 kg	Fatma Omar; Egypt	Lucy Ejike; Nigeria	Özlem Becerikli; Turkey
60 kg	Amalia Pérez; Mexico	Yang Yan; China	Amal Mahmoud; Egypt
67.5 kg	Souhad Ghazouani; France	Tan Yujiao; China	Victoria Nneji; Nigeria
75 kg	Fu Taoying; China	Folashade Oluwafemiayo; Nigeria	Lin Tzu-hui; Chinese Taipei
82.5 kg	Loveline Obiji; Nigeria	Randa Mahmoud; Egypt	Xu Yanmei; China
+82.5 kg	Grace Anozie; Nigeria	Heba Ahmed; Egypt	Perla Bárcenas; Mexico

=== Men's events ===
Event	Gold	Silver	Bronze
48 kg	Yakubu Adesokan; Nigeria	Vladimir Balynetc; Russia	Taha Abdelmagid; Egypt
52 kg	Feng Qi; China	Ikechukwu Obichukwu; Nigeria	Vladimir Krivulya; Russia
56 kg	Sherif Othman; Egypt	Anthony Ulonnam; Nigeria	Wang Jian; China
60 kg	Nader Moradi; Iran	Ifeanyi Nnajiofor; Nigeria	Yang Quanxi; China
67.5 kg	Liu Lei; China	Rouhollah Rostami; Iran	Shaaban Ibrahim; Egypt
75 kg	Ali Hosseini; Iran	Mohamed Elelfat; Egypt	Hu Peng; China
82.5 kg	Majid Farzin; Iran	Gu Xiaofei; China	Metwaly Mathana; Egypt
90 kg	Hany Abdelhady; Egypt	Cai Huichao; China	Pavlos Mamalos; Greece
100 kg	Mohamed Eldib; Egypt	Qi Dong; China	Ali Sadeghzadeh; Iran
+100 kg	Siamand Rahman; Iran	Faris Al-Ajeeli; Iraq	Chun Keun-bae; South Korea
