= 2010 IPC Powerlifting World Championships =

Parasports competition in Malaysia

5th IPC Powerlifting World Championships
- Host city: Kuala Lumpur
- Country: Malaysia
- Athletes: 292
- Sport: Paralympic powerlifting
- Events: 20
- Dates: 25–31 July 2010

The 2010 IPC Powerlifting World Championships was a competition for male and female athletes with a disability. It was held in Kuala Lumpur, Malaysia and ran from 25 to 31 July 2010.

Vietnamese powerlifter Lê Văn Công won a silver medal in the men's 48 kg event, but he was stripped of his medal after an anti-doping rule violation.

== Medalists ==
=== Men ===
Event	Gold	Silver	Bronze
48 kg	Omar Qarada; Jordan	Taha Adel; Egypt	Mustafa Radhi; Iraq
52 kg	Ashraf Ibrahim; Egypt	Qi Feng; China	Hussein Juboori; Iraq
56 kg	Sherif Othman; Egypt	Rasool Mohsin; Iraq	Nader Moradi; Iran
60 kg	Hamzeh Mohammadi; Iran	Ayrat Zakiev; Russia	Quanxi Yang; China
67.50 kg	Liu Lei; China	Ali Hosseini; Iran	Shaaban Ibrahim; Egypt
75 kg	Majid Farzin; Iran	Mutaz Zakaria Daoud Aljuneidi; Jordan	Abdelkalik Abdelkalik; Egypt
82.5 kg	Metwaly Mathana; Egypt	Mohamed Mamdouh El Dib; Egypt	Gu Xiaofei; China
90 kg	Hany Abdelhady; Egypt	Pavlos Mamalos; Greece	Ali Sadeghzadehsalma; Iran
100 kg	Tian Pingguang; China	Moatsem Ahmed; Libya	Elshan Huseynov; Azerbaijan
+100 kg	Kazem Rajabi Golojeh; Iran	Siamand Rahman; Iran	Faris Al-Ajeeli; Iraq

=== Women ===
Event	Gold	Silver	Bronze
40 kg	Nazmiye Muslu; Turkey	Lidiia Soloviova; Ukraine	Fu Tiecan; China
44 kg	Zeinab Oteify; Egypt	Justyna Kozdryk; Poland	Laura Cerero Gabriel; Mexico
48 kg	Olesya Lafina; Russia	Shi Shanshan; China	Xiao Cuijuan; China
52 kg	Tamara Podpalnaya; Russia	Wang Hongchan; China	Ozlem Becerikli; Turkey
56 kg	Yang Yan; China	Gihan Baioumy; Egypt	Irina Kazantseva; Russia
60 kg	Souhad Ghazouani; France	Amalia Perez Vazquez; Mexico	Amal Osman; Egypt
67.5 kg	Amany Ali; Egypt	Arawan Bootpo; Thailand	Wang Zhiping; China
75 kg	Lin Tzu-hui; Chinese Taipei	Randa Mahmoud; Egypt	Lyubov Semenyuk; Ukraine
82.5 kg	Hassan Geehan; Egypt	Huda Ali; Iraq	Sahar El-Gnemi; Libya
+82.5 kg	Perla Bárcenas; Mexico	Deahnne McIntyre; Australia	Liudmila Hreben; Belarus

== 2006 Results ==
- http://www.feddf.es/archivos/calendario/185.pdf - 2006 Men and Women Results
- http://en.olympic.cn/news/world/2006-04-29/847504.html - 2006
