= Powerlifting at the 2016 Summer Paralympics – Women's 61 kg =

Powerlifting – Women's 61 kg at the XV Paralympic Games
- Venue: Riocentro Pavilion 2
- Date: 11 September 2016
- Competitors: 8 from 8 nations
- Winning lift: 142.0 kg WR

Medalists
1st place, gold medalist(s)		Lucy Ejike	Nigeria
2nd place, silver medalist(s)		Fatma Omar	Egypt
3rd place, bronze medalist(s)		Yang Yan	China

The women's 61 kg powerlifting event at the 2016 Summer Paralympics was contested on 11 September at Riocentro Pavilion 2. Lin Ya-hsuan, representing Chinese Taipei competed in the Games for the fourth consecutive time. The best outcome out of three attempts counted as the final results. The athlete who placed first in each event was allowed a fourth attempt to break the Paralympic or world record.

== Records ==
There are twenty powerlifting events, corresponding to ten weight classes each for men and women. The weight categories were significantly adjusted after the 2012 Games so most of the weights are new for 2016. As a result, no Paralympic record was available for this weight class prior to the competition. The existing world records were as follows.

Record Type	Weight	Country	Venue	Date
World record	133 kg	Amalia Perez (MEX)	Toronto	10 August 2015
Paralympic record	–	–	–	–

== Results ==
Rank	Name	Body weight (kg)	Attempts (kg)				Result (kg)
Rank	Name	Body weight (kg)	1	2	3	4	Result (kg)
1st place, gold medalist(s)	Lucy Ejike (NGR)	59.13	136.0	138.0	142.0; WR PR	~~145.0~~	142.0
2nd place, silver medalist(s)	Fatma Omar (EGY)	60.31	~~133.0~~	133.0	140.0	–	140.0
3rd place, bronze medalist(s)	Yang Yan (CHN)	59.32	120.0	128.0	~~134.0~~	–	128.0
4	Malgorzata Halas-Koralewska (POL)	59.65	~~100.0~~	100.0	~~103.0~~	–	100.0
5	Tetyana Shyrokolava (UKR)	60.40	~~100.0~~	100.0	~~103.0~~	–	100.0
6	Chantell Stierman (RSA)	60.48	75.0	80.0	~~88.0~~	–	80.0
7	Lin Ya-hsuan (TPE)	57.83	78.0	~~81.0~~	~~81.0~~	–	78.0
–	Mariana D'Andrea (BRA)	60.61	~~96.0~~	~~96.0~~	~~101.0~~	–	NMR
