= Powerlifting at the 2016 Summer Paralympics – Men's 65 kg =

Powerlifting – Men's 65 kg at the XV Paralympic Games
- Venue: Riocentro
- Date: 10 September 2016
- Competitors: 12 from 12 nations
- Winning lift: 218.0 kg WR

Medalists
1st place, gold medalist(s)		Paul Kehinde	Nigeria
2nd place, silver medalist(s)		Hu Peng	China
3rd place, bronze medalist(s)		Shaaban Ibrahim	Egypt

The men's 65 kg powerlifting event at the 2016 Summer Paralympics was contested on 9 September at Riocentro.

== Records ==
There are twenty powerlifting events, corresponding to ten weight classes each for men and women. The weight categories were significantly adjusted after the 2012 Games so most of the weights are new for 2016. As a result, no Paralympic record was available for this weight class prior to the competition. The existing world records were as follows.

Record Type	Weight	Country	Venue	Date
World record	182 kg	Rasool Mohsin (IRI)	Incheon	21 October 2014
Paralympic record	–	–	–	–

== Results ==
Rank	Name	Body weight (kg)	Attempts (kg)				Result (kg)
Rank	Name	Body weight (kg)	1	2	3	4	Result (kg)
1st place, gold medalist(s)	Paul Kehinde (NGR)	63.06	205.0	210.0	218.00	220.0 WR PR	218.0
2nd place, silver medalist(s)	Hu Peng (CHN)	64.53	195.0	200.0	~~211.0~~	–	200.0
3rd place, bronze medalist(s)	Shaaban Ibrahim (EGY)	63.71	~~191.0~~	191.0	193.0	–	193.0
4	Hamzeh Mohammadi (IRI)	64.64	~~187.0~~	187.0	~~192.0~~	–	187.0
5	Nikolaos Gkountanis (GRE)	64.56	177.0	181.0	~~187.0~~	–	181.0
6	Michael Yule (GBR)	64.47	180.0	~~184.0~~	~~187.0~~	–	180.0
7	Hasan Al-Tameemi (IRQ)	64.54	165.0	~~168.0~~	171.0	–	171.0
8	Grzegorz Lanzer (POL)	62.18	170.0	~~175.0~~	~~181.0~~	–	170.0
9	Jose David Coronel (ARG)	63.85	130.0	~~138.0~~	~~139.0~~	–	130.0
-	Matteo Cattini (ITA)	62.74	~~137.0~~	~~137.0~~	~~139.0~~	–	NMR
-	Ahmad Razm Azar (AZE)	64.92	~~180.0~~	~~180.0~~	~~182.0~~	–	NMR
-	Hocine Bettir (ALG)	62.82	~~190.0~~	~~190.0~~	~~191.0~~	–	NMR
