= Para Archery at the 2025 Asian Youth Para Games =

Asian Youth Para Games

Para archery at the 2025 Asian Youth Para Games
- Venue: Dubai Club for People of Determination
- Location: Dubai, United Arab Emirates
- Dates: 10–12 December 2025
- Competitors: 37 (18 Men; 19 Women) from 11 nations

Para archery events at the 2025 Asian Youth Para Games were held at the Dubai Club for People of Determination in Dubai, United Arab Emirates from 10 to 12 December 2025. The sport made its return at the games after 12 years, since the 2013 edition.

== Calendar ==
Date	Events
8–9 December	Classification of athletes
10 December	Official Pracice
11 December	Qualification Round (C+R+W1); Elimination round (C+R+W1)
12 December	Finals (C+R+W1)

== Medal tally ==
2025 AYPG Medal Table – Para Archery
Rank	NPC	Gold	Silver	Bronze	Total
1	China (CHN)	4	4	4	12
2	India (IND)	2	2	1	5
3	South Korea (KOR)	1	0	0	1
4	Thailand (THA)	0	1	0	1
5	Malaysia (MAS)	0	0	1	1
5	Philippines (PHI)	0	0	1	1
Totals (6 entries)		7	7	7	21

== Results ==
=== Compound ===
Event	Gold	Silver	Bronze
Men's individual	Bao Yirui; China	Sitthidet Satsue; Thailand	Ran Xinxin; China
Women's individual	Sweta Kove; India	Yong Hui; China	Wang Huiting; China
Mixed team	Wang Huiting / Ran Xinxin; China	Yong Hui / Bao Yirui; China	Sweta Kove / Jituram Bediya; India

=== Recurve ===
Event	Gold	Silver	Bronze
Men's individual	Luo Jiawen; China	Jhongo Pahan; India	Muhammad Fakhrul Fauzi; Malaysia
Women's individual	Kwon Ha-yeon; South Korea	Bhawna; India	Chen Yu; China
Mixed team	Bhawna / Jhongo Pahan; India	Chen Yu / Luo Jiawen; China	Gao Zihan / Shao Haoning; China

=== W1 ===
Event	Gold	Silver	Bronze
Women's individual	Wang Liya; China	Fang Linghui; China	Jannah Kate Ballesta; Philippines

== Participants ==
1. Bangladesh (3)
2. China (10)
3. Indonesia (1)
4. India (7)
5. Iran (2)
6. Iraq (2)
7. Kazakhstan (1)
8. South Korea (1)
9. Malaysia (2)
10. Philippines (2)
11. Thailand (6)
