= Powerlifting at the 2012 Summer Paralympics – Women's 52 kg =

Powerlifting – Women's 52 kg at the XIV Paralympic Games
- Venue: ExCeL London
- Date: 1 September 2012
- Competitors: 8 from 8 nations
- Winning lift: 131 kg

Medalists
1st place, gold medalist(s)		Joy Onaolapo	Nigeria
2nd place, silver medalist(s)		Tamara Podpalnaya	Russia
3rd place, bronze medalist(s)		Xiao Cuijuan	China

The women's 52 kg powerlifting event at the 2012 Summer Paralympics was contested on 1 September at ExCeL London.

== Records ==
Prior to the competition, the existing world and Paralympic records were as follows.

World record	130.5 kg	Amalia Pérez (MEX)	Rio de Janeiro, Brazil	14 August 2007
Paralympic record	128.0 kg	Amalia Pérez (MEX)	Beijing, China	10 September 2008

== Results ==
Rank	Name	Body weight (kg)	Attempts (kg)				Result (kg)
Rank	Name	Body weight (kg)	1	2	3	4	Result (kg)
1st place, gold medalist(s)	Joy Onaolapo (NGR)	50.05	125.0	130.0	131.0	–	131.0 WR
2nd place, silver medalist(s)	Tamara Podpalnaya (RUS)	51.65	115.0	119.0	~~122.0~~	–	119.0
3rd place, bronze medalist(s)	Xiao Cuijuan (CHN)	51.43	~~118.0~~	118.0	~~121.0~~	–	118.0
4	Gihan Abdelaziz (EGY)	49.71	97.0	103.0	107.0	–	107.0
5	Tuyet Loan Chau Hoang (VIE)	49.16	100.0	104.0	~~107.0~~	–	104.0
6	Fatama Abdelghafer Ahmed Allawi (JOR)	51.45	80.0	85.0	~~88.0~~	–	85.0
–	Tetyana Shyrokolava (UKR)	51.29	~~93.0~~	~~93.0~~	~~93.0~~	–	NMR
–	Natalie Blake (GBR)	48.62	~~88.0~~	~~88.0~~	–	–	DNF
