= Powerlifting at the 2012 Summer Paralympics – Men's 60 kg =

Powerlifting – Men's 60 kg at the XIV Paralympic Games
- Venue: ExCeL London
- Date: 1 September 2012
- Competitors: 11 from 11 nations
- Winning lift: 196.0 kg

Medalists
1st place, gold medalist(s)		Nader Moradi	Iran
2nd place, silver medalist(s)		Ifeanyi Nnajiofor	Nigeria
3rd place, bronze medalist(s)		Quanxi Yang	China

The men's 60 kg powerlifting event at the 2012 Summer Paralympics was contested on 1 September at ExCeL London.

== Records ==
Prior to the competition, the existing world and Paralympic records were as follows.

World record	203.5 kg	Nader Moradi (IRI)	Sharjah, United Arab Emirates	2 December 2011
Paralympic record	202.5 kg	Hamzeh Mohammadi (IRI)	Beijing, China	11 September 2008

== Results ==
Rank	Name	Group	Body weight (kg)	Attempts (kg)				Result (kg)
Rank	Name	Group	Body weight (kg)	1	2	3	4	Result (kg)
1st place, gold medalist(s)	Nader Moradi (IRI)	A	59.52	192.0	196.0	~~203.0~~	–	196.0
2nd place, silver medalist(s)	Ifeanyi Nnajiofor (NGR)	A	57.80	184.0	188.0	~~190.0~~	–	188.0
3rd place, bronze medalist(s)	Quanxi Yang (CHN)	A	59.79	185.0	~~189.0~~	~~189.0~~	–	185.0
4	Izzettin Kanat (TUR)	A	57.99	180.0	~~185.0~~	~~185.0~~	–	180.0
5	Thongsa Marasri (THA)	B	59.31	175.0	~~182.0~~	~~185.0~~	–	175.0
6	Mariusz Tomczyk (POL)	A	58.74	~~171.0~~	~~171.0~~	171.0	–	171.0
7	Shadi Issa (SYR)	B	59.13	165.0	~~170.0~~	170.0	–	170.0
8	Jason Irving (GBR)	B	59.44	163.0	~~170.0~~	~~170.0~~	–	163.0
9	Aibek Abzhan (KAZ)	B	59.32	120.0	~~126.0~~	~~126.0~~	–	120.0
–	Shota Omarashvili (GEO)	B	58.93	~~135.0~~	~~135.0~~	~~135.0~~	–	NMR
–	Ayrat Zakiev (RUS)	A	59.50	~~195.0~~	~~195.0~~	~~195.0~~	–	NMR
