= Powerlifting at the 2016 Summer Paralympics – Men's 80 kg =

Powerlifting – Men's 80 kg at the XV Paralympic Games
- Venue: Riocentro
- Date: 12 September 2016
- Competitors: 10 from 10 nations
- Winning lift: 240.0 kg WR

Medalists
1st place, gold medalist(s)		Majid Farzin	Iran
2nd place, silver medalist(s)		Gu Xiaofei	China
3rd place, bronze medalist(s)		Akhror Bozorov	Uzbekistan

The men's 80 kg powerlifting event at the 2016 Summer Paralympics was contested on 12 September at Riocentro.

== Records ==
There are twenty powerlifting events, corresponding to ten weight classes each for men and women. The weight categories were significantly adjusted after the 2012 Games so most of the weights are new for 2016. As a result, no Paralympic record was available for this weight class prior to the competition. The existing world records were as follows.

Record Type	Weight	Country	Venue	Date
World record	236.5 kg	Majid Farzin (IRI)	Dubai	17 February 2016
Paralympic record	–	–	–	–

== Results ==
Rank	Name	Body weight (kg)	Attempts (kg)				Result (kg)
Rank	Name	Body weight (kg)	1	2	3	4	Result (kg)
1st place, gold medalist(s)	Majid Farzin (IRI)	78.58	230.0	235.0	240.0 WR PR	~~244.0~~	240.0
2nd place, silver medalist(s)	Gu Xiaofei (CHN)	77.67	221.0	228.0	~~235.0~~	-	228.0
3rd place, bronze medalist(s)	Akhror Bozorov (UZB)	75.00	~~195.0~~	~~200.0~~	207	–	207.0
4	Jainer Cantillo Guette (COL)	75.00	206.0	~~209.0~~	~~209.0~~	–	206.0
5	Tolu-Lope Taiwo (NGR)	78.27	200.0	~~207.0~~	~~207.0~~	–	200.0
6	Porfirio Francisco Arredondo Luna (MEX)	79.09	~~190.0~~	197.0	~~201.0~~	–	197.0
7	Ahmed Shafik (USA)	78.63	172.0	~~180.0~~	~~180.0~~	–	172.0
8	Gkremislav Moysiadis (GRE)	73.28	160.0	165.0	~~172.0.0~~	–	165.0
9	Charles Narh Teye (GHA)	78.45	157.0	160.0	~~165.0~~	–	160.0
-	Metwaly Mathna (EGY)	78.84	-	-	-	–	NMR
