= Powerlifting at the 2012 Summer Paralympics – Women's 67.5 kg =

Powerlifting – Women's 67.5 kg at the XIV Paralympic Games
- Venue: ExCeL London
- Date: 3 September 2012
- Competitors: 9 from 9 nations
- Winning lift: 146.0 kg

Medalists
1st place, gold medalist(s)		Souhad Ghazouani	France
2nd place, silver medalist(s)		Tan Yujiao	China
3rd place, bronze medalist(s)		Victoria Nneji	Nigeria

The women's 67.5 kg powerlifting event at the 2012 Summer Paralympics was contested on 3 September at ExCeL London.

== Records ==
Prior to the competition, the existing world and Paralympic records were as follows.

World record	147.0 kg	Souhad Ghazouani (FRA)	Dubai, United Arab Emirates	24 February 2012
Paralympic record	145.5 kg	Taoying Fu (CHN)	Beijing, China	13 September 2008

== Results ==
Rank	Name	Body weight (kg)	Attempts (kg)				Result (kg)
Rank	Name	Body weight (kg)	1	2	3	4	Result (kg)
1st place, gold medalist(s)	Souhad Ghazouani (FRA)	66.36	146.0	~~150.0~~	~~150.0~~	~~148.0~~	148.0 WR
2nd place, silver medalist(s)	Tan Yujiao (CHN)	67.32	136.0	139.0	~~147.0~~	–	139.0
3rd place, bronze medalist(s)	Victoria Nneji (NGR)	64.70	~~121.0~~	121.0	125.0	–	125.0
4	Vera Muratova (RUS)	65.06	107.0	111.0	~~116.0~~	–	111.0
5	Arawan Bootpo (THA)	66.42	111.0	~~116.0~~	~~116.0~~	–	111.0
6	Khadija Acem (MAR)	66.79	~~110.0~~	110.0	~~112.0~~	–	110.0
7	Valentina Simakova (TKM)	61.68	95.0	~~105.0~~	~~105.0~~	–	95.0
–	Larisa Marinenkova (MDA)	65.97	~~77.0~~	~~77.0~~	~~77.0~~	–	NMR
–	Carine Cynthia Amandine Tchei (CIV)	66.35	~~115.0~~	~~115.0~~	~~115.0~~	–	NMR

Key: PR=Paralympic record; WR=World record; NMR=No marks recorded
