= Powerlifting at the 2012 Summer Paralympics – Men's 67.5 kg =

Powerlifting – Men's 67.5 kg at the XIV Paralympic Games
- Venue: ExCeL London
- Date: 2 September 2012
- Competitors: 11 from 11 nations

Medalists
1st place, gold medalist(s)		Liu Lei	China
2nd place, silver medalist(s)		Rouhollah Rostami	Iran
3rd place, bronze medalist(s)		Shaaban Ibrahim	Egypt

The men's 67.5 kg powerlifting event at the 2012 Summer Paralympics was contested on 2 September at ExCeL London.

== Records ==
Prior to the competition, the existing world and Paralympic records were as follows.

World record	225.0 kg	Liu Lei (CHN)	Sharjah, United Arab Emirates	2 December 2011
Paralympic record	217.5 kg	Metwaly Mathana (EGY)	Beijing, China	13 September 2008

== Results ==
Rank	Name	Group	Body weight (kg)	Attempts (kg)				Result (kg)
Rank	Name	Group	Body weight (kg)	1	2	3	4	Result (kg)
1st place, gold medalist(s)	Liu Lei (CHN)	A	67.00	218.0	~~225.5~~	~~225.5~~	226.0 WR	218.0
2nd place, silver medalist(s)	Rouhollah Rostami (IRI)	A	67.10	205.0	208.0	~~219.0~~	–	208.0
3rd place, bronze medalist(s)	Shaaban Ibrahim (EGY)	A	66.02	195.0	202.0	~~209.0~~	–	202.0
4	Jainer Rafael Cantillo Guette (COL)	A	66.43	193.0	~~196.0~~	~~203.0~~	–	193.0
5	Tolu-Lope Taiwo (NGR)	A	66.58	185.0	~~193.0~~	~~195.0~~	–	185.0
6	Sergey Meladze (TKM)	A	63.56	~~180.0~~	180.0	~~185.0~~	–	180.0
7	Alexsander Whitaker (BRA)	B	67.41	~~165.0~~	165.0	~~176.0~~	–	165.0
8	Luis Israel Perea Polo (CUB)	B	66.52	160.0	~~180.0~~	~~183.0~~	–	160.0
9	Charles Narh Teye (GHA)	B	67.25	140.0	~~142.0~~	~~142.0~~	–	140.0
10	Roy Guerin (IRL)	B	65.59	~~128.0~~	131.0	~~134.0~~	–	131.0
–	Rajindersingh Rahelu (IND)	B	67.34	~~175.0~~	~~175.0~~	~~175.0~~	–	NMR
