= Powerlifting at the 2025 Asian Youth Para Games =

Asian Youth Para Games

- Venue: Dubai Club for People of Determination
- Location: Dubai, United Arab Emirates
- Dates: 10-12 December 2025

Powerlifting events at the 2025 Asian Youth Para Games are currently being held at the Dubai Club for People of Determination in Dubai, United Arab Emirates from 10 to 12 December 2025.

== Ages ==
Rookie (14–17)

Next Gen (18–20)

== History ==
Unlike the previous four editions, the way medals were distributed in these competitions was different. In previous editions, the weight classes were merged and in weight classes with less than 4 people, the last person was not awarded a medal. In weight classes where there was only one person, medals were given or not depending on the record. In this edition, medals were given to all the first to third place finishers. In weight classes where there was only one person, the person in question received a gold, silver, or bronze medal depending on his record, and it was possible that he did not receive a medal at all due to a low record.

The weightlifting organizing committee has returned the bronze medal to Iranian athlete Niayesh Salimi after conducting an investigation. With the start of the 79 kg weightlifting competition for women, considering that Niayesh Salimi was the only weightlifter in this weight category at this time of the Games, the organizing committee initially allowed her to compete in the medal section if she registered an entry record for this weight category (79 kg) and a medal would be considered for her according to the weights she registered. Accordingly, Niayesh Salimi, by lifting weights of 52, 57 and 60 kg and registering her entry for consideration by the organizers, hoped to receive a medal. But suddenly, they announced that a medal would not be awarded to our country's representative. On the final day of the Asian Para Games in the weightlifting discipline, competition officials, after re-examining, awarded a bronze medal to Niyaesh Salimi, a 79-kilogram female weightlifter, and gave her a third-place finish.

== Medal tally ==
* Host nation (United Arab Emirates)

Rank	NPC	Gold	Silver	Bronze	Total
1	Uzbekistan (UZB)	21	14	8	43
2	Iran (IRI)	9	6	5	20
3	Indonesia (INA)	1	3	0	4
4	Kazakhstan (KAZ)	1	2	3	6
5	Iraq (IRQ)	1	1	2	4
6	Thailand (THA)	1	1	1	3
7	Tajikistan (TJK)	1	1	0	2
8	South Korea (KOR)	1	0	2	3
9	Mongolia (MGL)	1	0	0	1
10	Malaysia (MAS)	0	2	0	2
10	Saudi Arabia (KSA)	0	2	0	2
12	India (IND)	0	1	2	3
13	United Arab Emirates (UAE)	0	0	2	2
Totals (13 entries)		37	33	25	95

== Medalists ==
=== Nextgen ===
Boys

Event	Gold	Silver	Bronze
49 kg	Syed Amir Ali Rashidimehr; Iran	Talal Albalawi; Saudi Arabia	Abdullokh Abdulazizov; Uzbekistan
54 kg	Davaa Ochir Jigmed; Mongolia	Mohammad Javad Moghadam; Iran	Kuanysh Rakhatuly; Kazakhstan
72 kg	Reza Hosseinvand; Iran	Akmal Karimbaev; Uzbekistan	Mustafa Al-sudani; Iraq
80 kg	Muhammadaziz Abdurashidov; Uzbekistan	Hassan Jelodar; Iran	Vinay; India
88 kg	Umidjon Arzimatov; Uzbekistan	Seyedmohammadhassan Faghihi; Iran	Not awarded
97 kg	Many Saeedi; Iran	Khusniddin Usmonjonov; Uzbekistan	Abdallah Jelani; United Arab Emirates
107 kg	Reza Enayatollahi; Iran	Jasurbek Yuldoshov; Uzbekistan	Jeong Geum-san; South Korea
+107 kg	Omadbek Mukhammadjonov; Uzbekistan	Makeshwaran Murugesh; India	Not awarded

Girls

Event	Gold	Silver	Bronze
41 kg	Zahra Pouladi Jarfi; Iran	Tursinay Urakbaeva; Uzbekistan	Ugiljon Zarifova; Uzbekistan
61 kg	Zuhra Yuldasheva; Uzbekistan	Melena Azikina; Kazakhstan	Not awarded
67 kg	Rukhshona Uktamov; Uzbekistan	Fatemeh Eimani Golbous; Iran	Dilnavo Abdumannobova; Uzbekistan
73 kg	Gulyuz Nematullaeva; Uzbekistan	Ozoda Boltaboeva; Uzbekistan	Not awarded
79 kg	Tursinoy Tursunbaeva; Uzbekistan	Not awarded	Not awarded

=== Rookies ===
Boys

Event	Gold	Silver	Bronze
54 kg	Bahriddin Kholbutaev; Uzbekistan	Imam Nur Shaleh; Indonesia	Sarawut Santhia; Thailand
107 kg	Azizbek Yakhyoev; Uzbekistan	Not awarded	Not awarded
+107 kg	Amirali Eshaghnia Ani; Iran	Jasurbek Ibragimov; Uzbekistan	Seo Hyeon-jun; South Korea

Girls

Event	Gold	Silver	Bronze
41 kg	Sultonposhsha Bardieva; Uzbekistan	Not awarded	Not awarded
45 kg	Mahdiyeh Ehsani; Iran	Fajr Al-samari Alsamari; Saudi Arabia	Not awarded
54 kg	Bahriddin Kholbutaev; Uzbekistan	Imam Nur Shaleh; Indonesia	Sarawut Santhia; Thailand
73 kg	Prapawan Phoprakun; Thailand	Feruzakhon Orifjonova; Uzbekistan	Gulsanam Abdumalikova; Uzbekistan

=== Mixed ===
Event	Gold	Silver	Bronze
Team	Uzbekistan	Uzbekistan	Uzbekistan
