= Akhror Bozorov =

Uzbekistani Paralympic powerlifter

Sport
- Country: Uzbekistan
- Sport: Paralympic powerlifting
Medal record
Representing Uzbekistan
Paralympic Games
| Bronze medal – third place | 2016 Rio de Janeiro | 80 kg |

Akhror Bozorov is a male Uzbekistani Paralympic powerlifter.

He represented Uzbekistan at the 2016 Summer Paralympics in Rio de Janeiro, Brazil and he won the bronze medal in the men's 80 kg event.
