= Powerlifting at the 2012 Summer Paralympics – Women's 56 kg =

Powerlifting – Women's 56 kg at the XIV Paralympic Games
- Venue: ExCeL London
- Date: 2 September 2012
- Competitors: 7 from 7 nations
- Winning lift: 142.0 kg

Medalists
1st place, gold medalist(s)		Fatma Omar	Egypt
2nd place, silver medalist(s)		Lucy Ejike	Nigeria
3rd place, bronze medalist(s)		Özlem Becerikli	Turkey

The women's 56 kg powerlifting event at the 2012 Summer Paralympics was contested on 2 September at ExCeL London.

== Records ==
Prior to the competition, the existing world and Paralympic records were as follows.

World record	141.5 kg	Fatma Omar (EGY)	Beijing, China	10 September 2008
Paralympic record	141.5 kg	Fatma Omar (EGY)	Beijing, China	10 September 2008

== Results ==
Rank	Name	Body weight (kg)	Attempts (kg)				Result (kg)
Rank	Name	Body weight (kg)	1	2	3	4	Result (kg)
1st place, gold medalist(s)	Fatma Omar (EGY)	54.86	132.0	137.0	142.0	–	142.0 WR
2nd place, silver medalist(s)	Lucy Ejike (NGR)	55.27	135.0	~~142.0~~	~~142.5~~	–	135.0
3rd place, bronze medalist(s)	Özlem Becerikli (TUR)	52.49	115.0	117.0	118.0	–	118.0
4	Jianjin Cui (CHN)	55.85	108.0	110.0	~~118.0~~	–	110.0
5	Irina Kazantseva (RUS)	54.45	101.0	~~108.0~~	~~108.0~~	–	101.0
6	Siow Lee Chan (MAS)	53.70	80.0	~~85.0~~	~~86.0~~	–	80.0
–	Elena Abasova (UZB)	54.60	~~65.0~~	~~70.0~~	~~72.0~~	–	NMR
