= Powerlifting at the 2016 Summer Paralympics – Women's 50 kg =

Powerlifting – Women's 50 kg at the XV Paralympic Games
- Venue: Riocentro
- Date: 10 September 2016
- Competitors: 9 from 9 nations
- Winning lift: 107.0 kg PR

Medalists
1st place, gold medalist(s)		Lidiia Soloviova	Ukraine
2nd place, silver medalist(s)		Rehab Ahmed	Egypt
3rd place, bronze medalist(s)		Đặng Thị Linh Phượng	Vietnam

The women's 50 kg powerlifting event at the 2016 Summer Paralympics was contested on 10 September at Riocentro.

== Records ==
There are twenty powerlifting events, corresponding to ten weight classes each for men and women. The weight categories were significantly adjusted after the 2012 Games so most of the weights are new for 2016. As a result, no Paralympic record was available for this weight class prior to the competition. The existing world records were as follows.

Record Type	Weight	Country	Venue	Date
World record	126 kg	Esther Oyema (NGR)	Glasgow	2 August 2014
Paralympic record	–	–	–	–

== Results ==
Rank	Name	Body weight (kg)	Attempts (kg)				Result (kg)
Rank	Name	Body weight (kg)	1	2	3	4	Result (kg)
1st place, gold medalist(s)	Lidiia Soloviova (UKR)	48.70	102.0	107.0 PR	~~112.0~~	~~109.0~~	107.0
2nd place, silver medalist(s)	Rehab Ahmed (EGY)	49.24	~~102.00~~	102.0	104.0	~~108.0~~	104.0
3rd place, bronze medalist(s)	Đặng Thị Linh Phượng (VIE)	48.96	98.0	102.0	~~104.0~~	–	102.0
4	Shi Shanshan (CHN)	49.69	100.0	~~103.0~~	~~103.0~~	–	100.0
5	Loida Zabala Ollero (ESP)	49.39	95.0	~~101.0~~	~~103.0~~	–	95.0
6	Rosaura Rodriguez Padilla (MEX)	48.90	80.0	82.0	~~85.0~~	–	82.0
7	Gulbanu Abdykhalykova (KAZ)	49.37	78.0	81.0	~~83.0~~	–	81.0
8	Zuray Marcano (VEN)	47.46	63.0	~~68.0~~	~~68.0~~	–	63
9	Katalin Mezei (HUN)	48.87	52.0	~~62.0~~	~~62.0~~	–	52
