= Powerlifting at the 2008 Summer Paralympics – Men's 67.5 kg =

Powerlifting - Men's 67.5 kg at the XIII Paralympic Games
- Venue: Beihang University Gymnasium
- Date: 13 September 2008
- Competitors: 14 from 14 nations

Medalists
1st place, gold medalist(s)		Metwaly Ibrahim Mathna	Egypt
2nd place, silver medalist(s)		Ali Hosseini	Iran
3rd place, bronze medalist(s)		Wu Maoshun	China

The men's 67.5 kg powerlifting event at the 2008 Summer Paralympics was contested on 13 September at the Beihang University Gymnasium in Beijing, China. This event was the fifth-lightest of the men's powerlifting weight classes, limiting competitors to a maximum of 67.5 kilograms (148.8 lb) of body mass. Powerlifters were divided into two groups, A and B, with group B beginning their lifts at 13:00 and group A at 13:45.

As with all Paralympic powerlifting events, lifters competed in the bench press. Each athlete was allowed three attempts to bench press as much weight as possible. Athletes attempting to break a record were allowed a fourth attempt. For the attempt to be valid, the competitor must have lowered the weighted bar to his chest, held it motionless for a moment, then pressed the bar upwards until his arms were fully extended. If the competitor failed to meet these requirements or any other rule infraction was committed, the attempt was declared invalid by a team of three referees and the result struck from the record.

== Results ==
Rank	Name	Group	Body weight (kg)	Attempts (kg)				Result (kg)
Rank	Name	Group	Body weight (kg)	1	2	3	4	Result (kg)
1st place, gold medalist(s)	Metwaly Ibrahim Mathna (EGY)	A	66.76	212.5	217.5 PR	~~222.5~~	–	217.5
2nd place, silver medalist(s)	Ali Hosseini (IRI)	A	67.20	207.5	215.0 PR	~~222.5~~	–	215.0
3rd place, bronze medalist(s)	Wu Maoshun (CHN)	A	67.18	195.0	197.5	200.0	–	200.0
4	Sergey Sychev (RUS)	A	66.36	182.5	190.0	~~197.5~~	–	190.0
5	Gkremislav Moysiadis (GRE)	A	66.77	182.5	187.5	~~192.5~~	–	187.5
6	Abderrahim El Ammari (MAR)	A	64.77	177.5	~~182.5~~	182.5	–	182.5
7	Luis Perea (CUB)	B	66.30	172.5	175.0	180.0	–	180.0
8	Mariappan Perumal (MAS)	A	66.35	175.0	180.0	~~182.5~~	–	180.0
9	Mohammed Mohammed (IRQ)	B	65.08	172.5	175.0	~~180.0~~	–	175.0
10	Alexsander Whitaker (BRA)	B	66.06	172.5	~~177.5~~	~~177.5~~	–	172.5
11	Andy Wise (USA)	B	66.03	142.5	150.0	~~155.0~~	–	150.0
12	Hasan Alderazi (BRN)	B	66.84	125.0	132.5	~~137.5~~	–	132.5
13	Zakari Amadou (NIG)	B	66.81	105.0	110.0	~~120.0~~	–	110.0
–	Mohammad Fahim Rahimi (AFG)	B	63.49	~~90.0~~	~~110.0~~	~~130.0~~	–	NMR

Key: PR=Paralympic record; NMR=No marks recorded
