= Powerlifting at the 2008 Summer Paralympics – Women's 67.5 kg =

Powerlifting - Women's 67.5 kg at the XIII Paralympic Games
- Venue: Beihang University Gymnasium
- Date: 13 September 2008
- Competitors: 10 from 10 nations

Medalists
1st place, gold medalist(s)		Fu Taoying	China
2nd place, silver medalist(s)		Amoge Victoria Nneji	Nigeria
3rd place, bronze medalist(s)		Rasha Alshikh	Syria

The women's 67.5 kg powerlifting event at the 2008 Summer Paralympics was contested on 13 September at the Beihang University Gymnasium in Beijing, China. This event was the fourth heaviest of the women's powerlifting weight classes, limiting competitors to a maximum of 67.5 kilograms (148.8 lb) of body mass.

As with all Paralympic powerlifting events, lifters competed in the bench press. Each athlete was allowed three attempts to bench press as much weight as possible. Athletes attempting to break a record were allowed a fourth attempt. For the attempt to be valid, the competitor must have lowered the weighted bar to her chest, held it motionless for a moment, then pressed the bar upwards until her arms were fully extended. If the competitor failed to meet these requirements or any other rule infraction was committed, the attempt was declared invalid by a team of three referees and the result struck from the record.

== Results ==
Rank	Name	Body weight (kg)	Attempts (kg)				Result (kg)
Rank	Name	Body weight (kg)	1	2	3	4	Result (kg)
1st place, gold medalist(s)	Fu Taoying (CHN)	67.07	137.5	142.5	~~145.5~~	145.5 WR	145.5
2nd place, silver medalist(s)	Amoge Victoria Nneji (NGR)	64.44	125.0	132.5	~~142.5~~	–	132.5
3rd place, bronze medalist(s)	Rasha Alshikh (SYR)	67.00	115.0	117.5	~~122.5~~	–	117.5
4	Rania Alaa Eldin Morshedi (EGY)	66.43	115.0	~~120.0~~	~~120.0~~	–	115.0
5	Josilene Ferreira (BRA)	66.98	100.0	~~105.0~~	~~110.0~~	–	100.0
6	Svitlana Hedian (UKR)	67.02	90.0	95.0	~~97.5~~	–	95.0
7	Anastasia Kazantzidou (GRE)	67.00	82.5	~~87.5~~	87.5	–	87.5
8	Larisa Marinencov (MDA)	66.91	72.5	77.5	~~82.5~~	–	77.5
–	Blandine Sahenou (BEN)	62.78	~~70.0~~	~~70.0~~	~~75.0~~	–	NMR
–	Ivanka Koleva (BUL)	64.45	~~90.0~~	~~92.5~~	~~92.5~~	–	NMR

Key: WR=World record; NMR=No marks recorded
