= Wu Maoshun =

Chinese Paralympic powerlifter

Sport
- Country: China
- Sport: Paralympic powerlifting
- Weight class: 67.5 kg
Medal record
Paralympic Games
Silver medal – second place	2004 Athens	67.5 kg
Bronze medal – third place	2008 Beijing	67.5 kg

Wu Maoshun is a Chinese Paralympic powerlifter. He represented China at the 2004 Summer Paralympics and at the 2008 Summer Paralympics and he won two medals: the silver medal in the men's 67.5 kg event in 2004 and the bronze medal in the men's 67.5 kg event in 2008.
