= Powerlifting at the 2008 Summer Paralympics – Men's 60 kg =

Powerlifting - Men's 60 kg at the XIII Paralympic Games
- Venue: Beihang University Gymnasium
- Date: 11 September 2008
- Competitors: 13 from 13 nations

Medalists
1st place, gold medalist(s)		Hamzeh Mohammadi	Iran
2nd place, silver medalist(s)		Ayrat Zakiev	Russia
3rd place, bronze medalist(s)		Shaaban Ibrahim	Egypt

The men's 60 kg powerlifting event at the 2008 Summer Paralympics was contested on 11 September at the Beihang University Gymnasium in Beijing, China. This event was the fourth-lightest of the men's powerlifting weight classes, limiting competitors to a maximum of 60 kilograms (132.3 lb) of body mass. Powerlifters were divided into two groups, A and B, with group B beginning their lifts at 16:30 and group A at 17:15.

As with all Paralympic powerlifting events, lifters competed in the bench press. Each athlete was allowed three attempts to bench press as much weight as possible. Athletes attempting to break a record were allowed a fourth attempt. For the attempt to be valid, the competitor must have lowered the weighted bar to his chest, held it motionless for a moment, then pressed the bar upwards until his arms were fully extended. If the competitor failed to meet these requirements or any other rule infraction was committed, the attempt was declared invalid by a team of three referees and the result struck from the record.

== Results ==
Rank	Name	Group	Body weight (kg)	Attempts (kg)				Result (kg)
Rank	Name	Group	Body weight (kg)	1	2	3	4	Result (kg)
1st place, gold medalist(s)	Hamzeh Mohammadi (IRI)	A	59.53	192.5	197.5	202.5 PR	~~205.5~~	202.5
2nd place, silver medalist(s)	Ayrat Zakiev (RUS)	A	58.98	187.5	195.0	200.0 PR	~~205.0~~	200.0
3rd place, bronze medalist(s)	Shaaban Ibrahim (EGY)	A	58.46	187.5	192.5	195.0	–	195.0
4	Mariusz Tomczyk (POL)	A	58.99	160.0	165.0	170.0	–	170.0
5	Rajinder Singh (IND)	A	59.61	170.0	~~175.0~~	~~175.0~~	–	170.0
6	Jainer Cantillo (COL)	A	58.29	160.0	~~170.0~~	~~172.5~~	–	160.0
7	Prasit Thongdee (THA)	B	59.41	155.0	160.0	~~165.0~~	–	160.0
8	Billy Zeth Makal (INA)	A	58.12	157.5	~~162.5~~	~~167.5~~	–	157.5
9	Hasan Al-Temeemi (IRQ)	B	59.19	152.5	~~157.5~~	~~157.5~~	–	152.5
10	Billy Ssengendo (UGA)	B	59.89	147.5	152.5	~~162.5~~	–	152.5
11	David Nard (FRA)	B	59.53	140.0	~~147.5~~	~~152.5~~	–	140.0
12	Nasir Butt (PAK)	B	59.87	115.0	125.0	~~135.0~~	–	125.0
13	Tom Tete (VAN)	B	59.34	~~60.0~~	~~75.0~~	80.0	–	80.0

Key: PR=Paralympic record
