= Liberia at the Paralympics =

- IPC code: LBR
- NPC: Liberia National Paralympic Committee
- Medals: Gold 0 Silver 0 Bronze 0 Total 0

Summer appearances
- 2012; 2016; 2020; 2024

Liberia made its Paralympic Games debut at the 2012 Summer Paralympics in London, sending one representative to compete in powerlifting.

== See also ==
- Liberia at the Olympics
