= Ifeanyi Nnajiofor =

Nigerian Paralympic powerlifter

Sport
- Country: Nigeria
- Sport: Paralympic powerlifting
Medal record
Paralympic Games
Silver medal – second place	2012 London	60 kg

Ifeanyi Nnajiofor is a Nigerian Paralympic powerlifter. He represented Nigeria at the 2012 Summer Paralympics held in London, United Kingdom and he won the silver medal in the men's 60 kg event. He also competed in the 2014 IPC Powerlifting World Championships held in Dubai. Ifeanayi Nnajiofor's coach for these events was Prince Feyisetan Are.
