= Nwokorie =

- Gender: Male
- Language: Igbo

Origin
- Origin: Nigerian
- Meaning: male child born on orie
- Region of origin: South East, Nigeria

Nwokorie audio is a Nigerian surname. It is a male name, and it is of Igbo origin. It means “a male child born on orie” meanwhile orie is one of the four market days in Igbo land in the Eastern region of Nigeria.

== Notable individuals with the name ==
- Chukie Nwokorie, (born 1975) American football player
- Ivory Nwokorie, Nigerian powerlifter
