= Zuray Marcano =

Venezuelan Paralympic powerlifter (1954–2020)

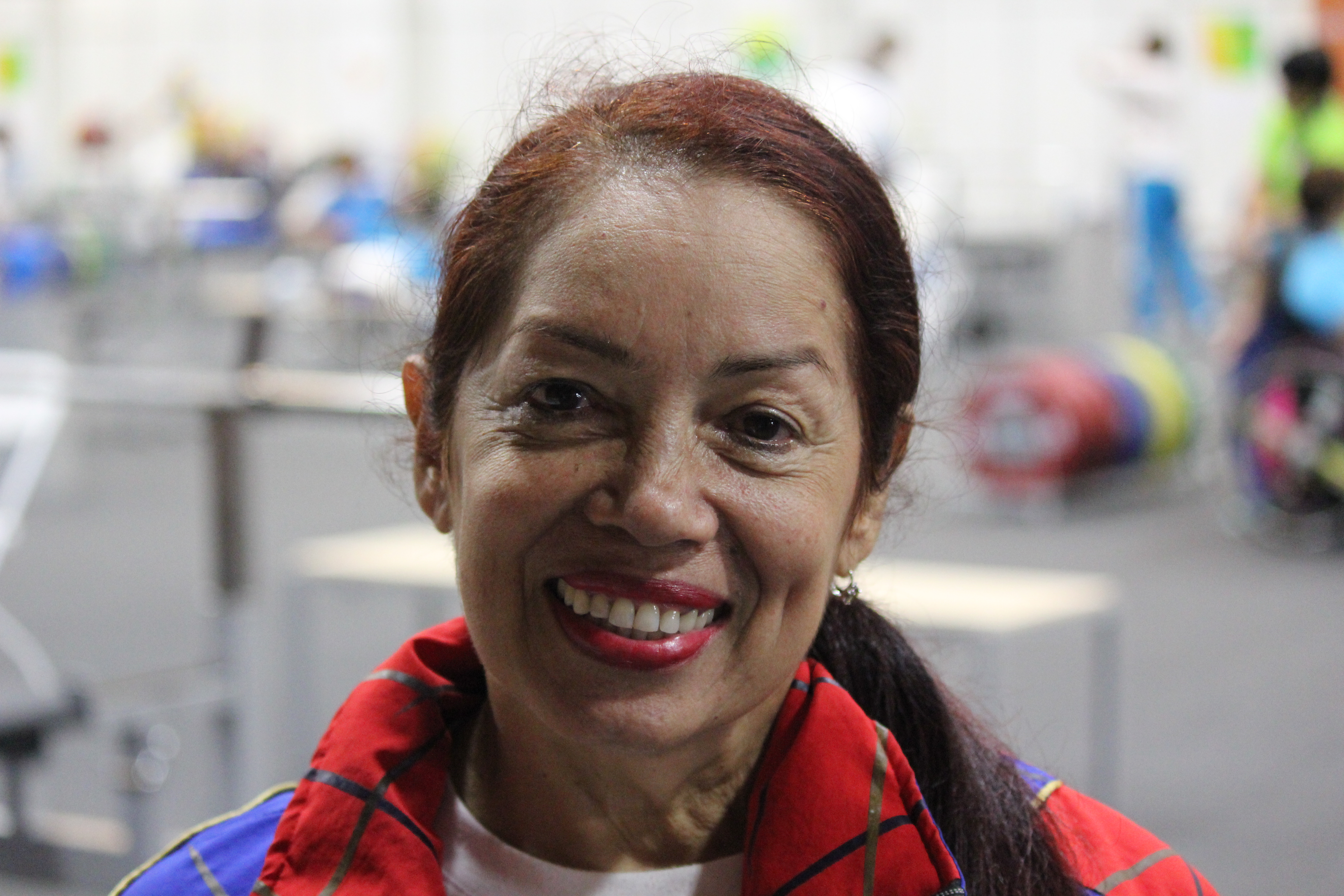
- in Rio in 2016

Personal information
- Born: 26 May 1954 El Tigre, Venezuela
- Died: 23 August 2020 (aged 66) Maracay, Venezuela

Sport
- Country: Venezuela
- Sport: Powerlifting
- Event: 50 kilogram class
Medal record
Representing Venezuela
Women's powerlifting
Paralympic Games
- Updated on 7 September 2016

Zuray Marcano Fuenmayor (26 May 1954 – 23 August 2020) was a Venezuelan teacher and Paralympic powerlifter. In 2016, she was a competitor at the Rio Paralympics at the age of 62.

== Life ==
Marcano was born in 1954 and suffered from polio whilst still a baby. She was left with disabilities which meant that when her fellow schoolmates did sports and exercise she was asked to keep score and she never competed. She took a degree in teaching and she was awarded a master's degree in Education from the University of the Basque Country in Bilbao.

Marcano tried athletics and swimming but settled on powerlifting when she was 35. Mercano had two children. When she was chosen to compete at the 2000 Summer Paralympics in Sydney she saw it as a learning experience where she could prove that she too could compete. Marcano came eighth in the 48 kg category after lifting 62 kg.

She competed at the 2011 Parapan Am Games in Guadalajara.

She qualified for the 2016 Summer Paralympics in Rio at the age of 62. Marcano achieved her personal best and was placed eighth in her 50kg category after lifting 63 kg. The gold medal was taken by Lidiia Soloviova of Ukraine who lifted 107 kg.

Marcano died on 23 August 2020 in her hometown aged 66.
