= Powerlifting at the 2012 Summer Paralympics – Men's 82.5 kg =

Powerlifting – Men's 82.5 kg at the XIV Paralympic Games
- Venue: ExCeL London
- Date: 4 September 2012
- Competitors: 14 from 14 nations
- Winning lift: 237

Medalists
1st place, gold medalist(s)		Majid Farzin	Iran
2nd place, silver medalist(s)		Gu Xiaofei	China
3rd place, bronze medalist(s)		Metwaly Mathana	Egypt

The men's 82.5 kg powerlifting event at the 2012 Summer Paralympics was contested on 4 September at ExCeL London.

== Records ==
Prior to the competition, the existing world and Paralympic records were as follows.

World record	248.5 kg	Haidong Zhang (CHN)	Kunming, China	18 May 2007
Paralympic record	243.0 kg	Jong Chul Park (KOR)	Sydney, Australia	27 October 2000

== Results ==
Rank	Name	Group	Rack height	Body weight (kg)	Attempts (kg)				Result (kg)
Rank	Name	Group	Rack height	Body weight (kg)	1	2	3	4	Result (kg)
1st place, gold medalist(s)	Majid Farzin (IRI)	A	12	80.44	233.0	235.0	237.0	~~244.0~~	237.0
2nd place, silver medalist(s)	Gu Xiaofei (CHN)	A	13	80.92	221.0	228.0	~~238.0~~	–	228.0
3rd place, bronze medalist(s)	Metwaly Mathana (EGY)	A	14	80.68	227.0	~~234.0~~	~~237.0~~	–	227.0
4	Opeyemi Jegede (NGR)	B	14	80.22	~~190.0~~	200.0	205.0	–	205.0
5	Porfirio Francisco Arredondo Luna (MEX)	A	11	81.91	195.0	~~201.0~~	~~206.0~~	–	195.0
6	Hideki Odo (JPN)	A	14	81.95	181.0	187.0	191.0	–	191.0
7	James Siaffa (LBR)	B	16	80.43	180.0	190.0	~~197.0~~	–	190.0
8	Piotr Szymeczek (POL)	A	13	80.59	190.0	~~195.0~~	~~195.0~~	–	190.0
9	Sachin Chaudhary (IND)	A	15	82.08	~~187.0~~	187.0	~~188.0~~	–	187.0
10	Theogene Hakizimana (RWA)	B	17	79.56	165.0	175.0	~~180.0~~	–	175.0
11	Karen Abramyants (RUS)	B	13	81.57	165.0	~~176.0~~	~~176.0~~	–	165.0
12	Abdelrazik Baaba (LBA)	B	16	80.13	150.0	155.0	~~163.0~~	–	155.0
-	Jose Marino (ECU)	B	12	81.93	~~175.0~~	~~177.0~~	~~177.0~~	–	NMR
-	Ahmed Shafik (USA)	B	13	81.25	~~180.0~~	~~180.0~~	~~180.0~~	–	NMR
