= Powerlifting at the 2008 Summer Paralympics – Women's 40 kg =

Powerlifting - Women's 40 kg at the XIII Paralympic Games
- Venue: Beihang University Gymnasium
- Date: 9 September
- Competitors: 8 from 8 nations

Medalists
| 1st place, gold medalist(s) | | Lidiya Solovyova | Ukraine |
| 2nd place, silver medalist(s) | | Cui Zhe | China |
| 3rd place, bronze medalist(s) | | Laura Cerero | Mexico |

The women's 40 kg powerlifting event at the 2008 Summer Paralympics was contested on 9 September at the Beihang University Gymnasium in Beijing, China. This event was the lightest of the women's powerlifting weight classes, limiting competitors to a maximum of 40 kilograms (88.2 lb) of body mass.

As with all Paralympic powerlifting events, lifters competed in the bench press. Each athlete was allowed three attempts to bench press as much weight as possible. Athletes attempting to break a record were allowed a fourth attempt. For the attempt to be valid, the competitor must have lowered the weighted bar to her chest, held it motionless for a moment, then pressed the bar upwards until her arms were fully extended. If the competitor failed to meet these requirements or any other rule infraction was committed, the attempt was declared invalid by a team of three referees and the result struck from the record.

== Results ==
| Rank | Name | Body weight (kg) | Attempts (kg) | | | | Result (kg) |
| Rank | Name | Body weight (kg) | 1 | 2 | 3 | 4 | Result (kg) |
|---|---|---|---|---|---|---|---|
| 1st place, gold medalist(s) | Lidiya Solovyova (UKR) | 39.18 | 95.0 | ~~100.0~~ | 100.0 | 105.5 WR | 105.5 |
| 2nd place, silver medalist(s) | Cui Zhe (CHN) | 38.31 | 90.0 | 92.5 | 95.0 | – | 95.0 |
| 3rd place, bronze medalist(s) | Laura Cerero (MEX) | 39.49 | 90.0 | 92.5 | ~~95.0~~ | – | 92.5 |
| 4 | Nazmiye Muslu (TUR) | 39.65 | ~~85.0~~ | 90.0 | ~~95.0~~ | – | 90.0 |
| 5 | Nancy Martinez (ECU) | 39.75 | 75.0 | 77.5 | 80.0 | – | 80.0 |
| 6 | Malika Matar (MAR) | 38.99 | 77.5 | ~~82.5~~ | ~~82.5~~ | – | 77.5 |
| 7 | Emilia Lipowska (POL) | 38.29 | 70.0 | ~~75.0~~ | ~~75.0~~ | – | 70.0 |
| 8 | Lam Yim Hung (HKG) | 38.13 | ~~60.0~~ | ~~62.5~~ | 62.5 | – | 62.5 |

Key: WR=World record
