= Liberia at the 2024 Summer Paralympics =

- IPC code: LBR

in Paris, France August 28, 2024 – September 8, 2024
- Competitors: 2 (1 man and 1 woman) in 1 sport
- Flag bearers: Jutomu Kollie; Angie Myers
- Medals: Gold 0 Silver 0 Bronze 0 Total 0

Summer Paralympics appearances (overview)
- 2012; 2016; 2020; 2024

Liberia competed at the 2024 Summer Paralympics in Paris, France, from 28 August to 8 September 2024. This was the nation's third time competing at the Summer Paralympic Games after it made its debut at the 2012 Summer Paralympics. The delegation consisted of two competitors from one sport.

== Competitors ==
The following is the list of number of competitors in the Games.

Sport	Men	Women	Total
Athletics	1	1	2
Total	1	1	2

== Athletics ==
Athlete	Event	Heat		Final	
Athlete	Event	Result	Rank	Result	Rank
Angie Myers	Women's shot put F57	6.42	3 q	DNS	
Jutomu Kollie	Men's 100 metres T47	12.81	9	Did not advance	
Jutomu Kollie	Men's long jump T47	—N/a		DNS	
Jutomu Kollie	Men's javelin throw F46	—N/a		32.31	9

== See also ==
- Liberia at the 2024 Summer Olympics
- Liberia at the Paralympics
