= Özlem Becerikli =

Turkish Paralympic powerlifter (born 1980)

Personal information
- Nationality: Turkish
- Born: 21 March 1980 (age 46) Balıkesir, Turkey
- Weight: 43 kg (95 lb) (2012)

Sport
- Country: Turkey
- Sport: Powerlifting
- Event: -56 kg
- Club: Kocaeli Büyükşehir Belediyesi Kağıtspor
- Coached by: Şule Şahbaz

Achievements and titles
- Paralympic finals: 2012
Medal record
Women's powerlifting
Representing Turkey
Paralympic Games
Bronze medal – third place	2012 London	−56 kg
IPC World Championships
Bronze medal – third place	2010 Kuala Lumpur	−52 kg
Tournaments
Bronze medal – third place	2010 Dubai	−52 kg
Bronze medal – third place	2011 Darwin	−52 kg

Özlem Becerikli (born 21 March 1980, in Balıkesir, Turkey) is a Turkish powerlifter of class PO competing in the -56 kg division, and a Paralympian. She is a member of the Kocaeli Büyükşehir Belediyesi Kağıtspor, where she is coached by Şule Şahbaz.

== Career history ==
Becerikli took the bronze medal in the -52 kg division at the 2010 IPC Powerlifting World Championships held in Kuala Lumpur, Malesia. Özlem was the winner of another bronze medal taken at the Fazza International Powerlifting Championships in Dubai, United Arab Emirates in 2010. In 2011, she became bronze medalist at the Arafura Games in Darwin, Australia.

She won the bronze medal at the 2012 Paralympics.

== Achievements ==
Year	Competition	Venue	Position	Event	Notes
Representing Turkey
2010	IPC World Championships	Kuala Lumpur, Malesia	3rd	-52 kg	100 kg
2010	Fazza International Powerlifting Championships	Dubai, UAE	3rd	-52 kg	114 kg
2011	Arafura Games	Darwin, Australia	3rd	-52 kg	102.5 kg
2012	Summer Paralympics	London, United Kingdom	3rd	-56 kg	118.0 kg
