= Powerlifting at the 2004 Summer Paralympics – Men's 67.5 kg =

Men's Up To 67.5 kg at the XII Paralympic Games
- Paralympic Powerlifting
- Venue: Nikaia Olympic Weightlifting Hall
- Dates: 24 September 2004
- Competitors: 13 from 13 nations
- Winning weight(kg): 212.5

Medalists
1st place, gold medalist(s)		Metwaly Mathna	Egypt
2nd place, silver medalist(s)		Wu Maoshun	China
3rd place, bronze medalist(s)		Hamzeh Mohammadi	Iran

The Men's 67.5 kg powerlifting event at the 2004 Summer Paralympics was competed on 24 September. It was won by Metwaly Mathna, representing Egypt.

== Final round ==
24 Sept. 2004, 13:45

Rank	Athlete	Weight(kg)	Notes
1st place, gold medalist(s)	Metwaly Mathna (EGY)	212.5	
2nd place, silver medalist(s)	Wu Maoshun (CHN)	200.0	
3rd place, bronze medalist(s)	Hamzeh Mohammadi (IRI)	200.0	
4	Aleksander Whitaker (BRA)	180.0	
5	Mariappan Perumal (MAS)	180.0	
6	Nikolaos Gkountanis (GRE)	165.0	
7	Sin Dae Heon (KOR)	157.5	
8	Hajime Ujiro (JPN)	147.5	
9	Gevorg Karakashyan (ARM)	137.5	
10	Anton Pouskov (BUL)	135.0	
11	Antonio Arranz (ESP)	130.0	
12	Iurii Marinenkov (MDA)	127.5	
	Porfirio Arredondo (MEX)	NMR	
