= Powerlifting at the 2004 Summer Paralympics – Women's 60 kg =

Women's Up To 60 kg at the XII Paralympic Games
- Paralympic Powerlifting
- Venue: Nikaia Olympic Weightlifting Hall
- Dates: 24 September 2004
- Competitors: 7 from 7 nations
- Winning weight(kg): 132.5

Medalists
1st place, gold medalist(s)		Fu Taoying	China
2nd place, silver medalist(s)		Souhad Ghazouani	France
3rd place, bronze medalist(s)		Amany Aly	Egypt

The Women's 60 kg powerlifting event at the 2004 Summer Paralympics was competed on 24 September. It was won by Fu Taoying, representing China.

== Final round ==
24 Sept. 2004, 16:30

Rank	Athlete	Weight(kg)	Notes
1st place, gold medalist(s)	Fu Taoying (CHN)	132.5	WR
2nd place, silver medalist(s)	Souhad Ghazouani (FRA)	120.0	
3rd place, bronze medalist(s)	Amany Aly (EGY)	117.5	
4	Khadija Acem (MAR)	115.0	
5	Lyudmyla Osmanova (UKR)	107.5	
6	Siow Lee Chan (MAS)	87.5	
7	Chantell Stierman (RSA)	85.0	
