= Powerlifting at the 2012 Summer Paralympics – Men's 75 kg =

Powerlifting – Men's 75 kg at the XIV Paralympic Games
- Venue: ExCeL London
- Date: 3 September 2012
- Competitors: 13 from 13 nations
- Winning lift: 225.0 kg

Medalists
1st place, gold medalist(s)		Ali Hosseini	Iran
2nd place, silver medalist(s)		Mohamed Elelfat	Egypt
3rd place, bronze medalist(s)		Peng Hu	China

The men's 75 kg powerlifting event at the 2012 Summer Paralympics was contested on 3 September at ExCeL London.

== Records ==
Prior to the competition, the existing world and Paralympic records were as follows.

World record	240.0 kg	Haidong Zhang (CHN)	Sydney, Australia	26 October 2000
Paralympic record	240.0 kg	Haidong Zhang (CHN)	Sydney, Australia	26 October 2000

== Results ==
Rank	Name	Group	Body weight (kg)	Attempts (kg)				Result (kg)
Rank	Name	Group	Body weight (kg)	1	2	3	4	Result (kg)
1st place, gold medalist(s)	Ali Hosseini (IRI)	A	73.87	216.0	220.0	225.0	–	225.0
2nd place, silver medalist(s)	Mohamed Elelfat (EGY)	A	73.62	213.0	219.0	~~224.0~~	–	219.0
3rd place, bronze medalist(s)	Peng Hu (CHN)	A	72.17	205.0	~~213.0~~	213.0	–	213.0
4	Sergei Sychev (RUS)	A	73.20	~~213.0~~	~~213.0~~	213.0	–	213.0
5	Gkremislav Moysiadis (GRE)	A	72.38	183.0	188.0	~~190.0~~	–	188.0
6	Wawrzyniec Latus (POL)	A	73.86	~~183.0~~	183.0	~~189.0~~	–	183.0
7	Hajime Ujiro (JPN)	B	74.65	176.0	~~180.0~~	180.0	–	180.0
8	Mariappan Perumal (MAS)	B	74.11	~~170.0~~	~~170.0~~	170.0	–	170.0
9	Stefan Rosca (MDA)	B	73.88	160.0	167.0	~~170.0~~	–	167.0
10	Timothy Harabe (PNG)	B	74.00	~~160.0~~	160.0	~~164.0~~	–	160.0
11	Jose David Coronel (ARG)	B	74.06	140.0	145.0	150.0	–	150.0
12	Mohammad Fahim Rahimi (AFG)	B	70.94	~~120.0~~	120.0	127.0	–	127.0
–	Parviz Odinaev (TJK)	A	74.91	~~183.0~~	~~183.0~~	~~183.0~~	–	NMR

Key: PR=Paralympic record; WR=World record; NMR=No marks recorded
