= Lidiia Soloviova =

Ukrainian Paralympic powerlifter

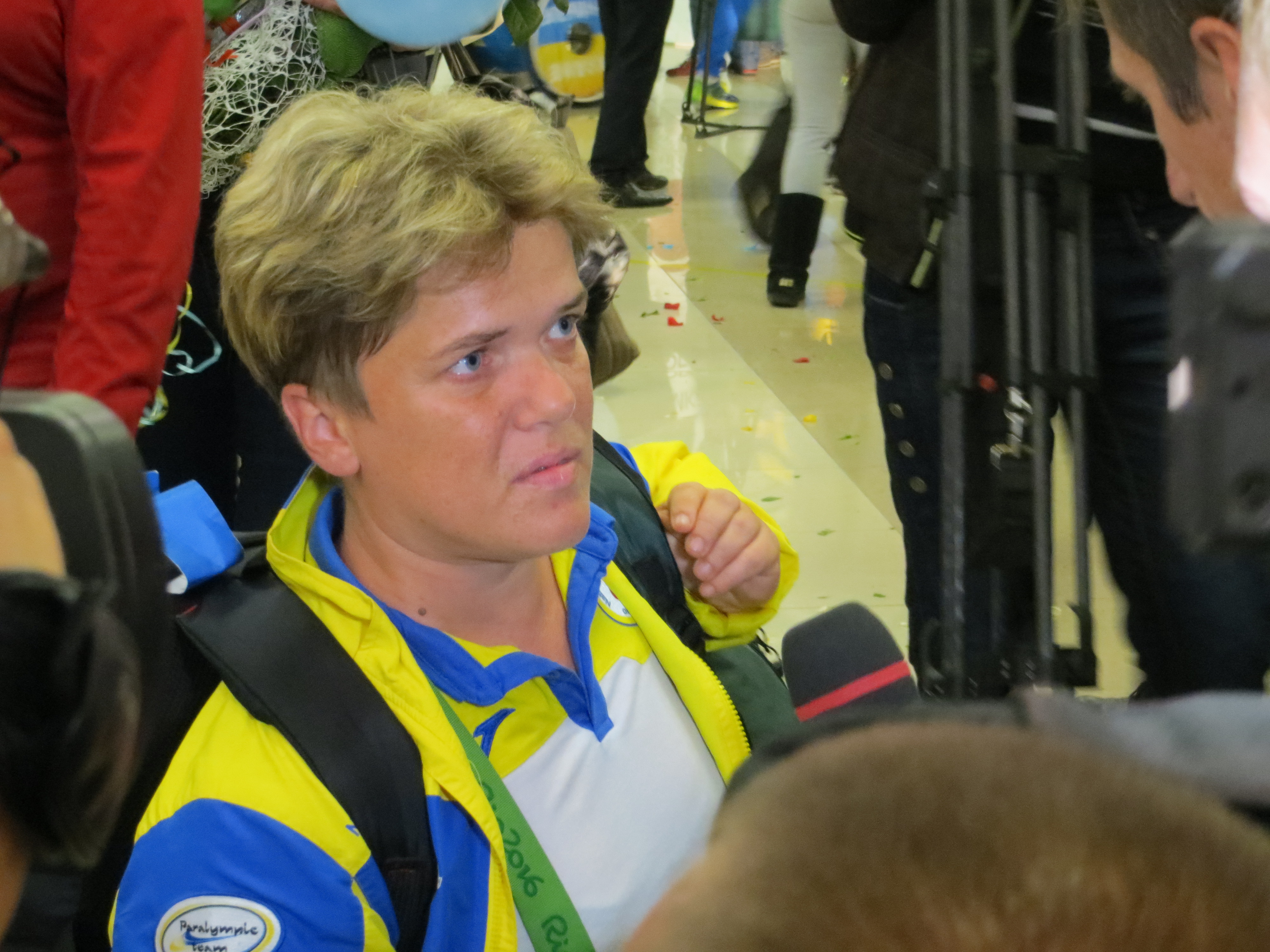

Personal information
- Born: 21 January 1978 (age 48) Dnipropetrovsk, Ukraine

Sport
- Country: Ukraine
- Sport: Powerlifting
- Club: Invasport, Dnipropetrovsk
- Coached by: Olexandr Alferov
Medal record
Women's powerlifting
Representing Ukraine
Paralympic Games
Gold medal – first place	2004 Athens	40 kg
Gold medal – first place	2008 Beijing	40 kg
Gold medal – first place	2016 Rio de Janeiro	50 kg
Silver medal – second place	2000 Sydney	40 kg
Bronze medal – third place	2012 London	44 kg
World Championships
Gold medal – first place	2006 Busan	40 kg
Silver medal – second place	2002 Kuala Lumpur	40 kg
Silver medal – second place	2010 Kuala Lumpur	40 kg
Silver medal – second place	2014 Dubai	50 kg
Bronze medal – third place	2019 Nur-Sultan	50 kg
Bronze medal – third place	2019 Nur-Sultan	Mixed team
Bronze medal – third place	2021 Tbilisi	50 kg

Lidiia Soloviova (born 21 January 1978) is a Ukrainian disability powerlifter, who has represented Ukraine at the 2000, 2004, 2008, 2012 and 2016 Summer Paralympics.

She qualified for the 2016 Summer Paralympics who took the gold medal after lifting 107 kg in the Powerlifting Women's 50 kg ⋅category. Her competitors included Zuray Marcano who was one of the oldest Olympians as she was aged 62.

She won the bronze medal in the women's 50 kg event at the 2021 World Para Powerlifting Championships held in Tbilisi, Georgia.
