= Liberia at the 2012 Summer Paralympics =

- IPC code: LBR
- NPC: Liberia National Paralympic Committee

in London
- Competitors: 1 in 1 sport
- Medals: Gold 0 Silver 0 Bronze 0 Total 0

Summer Paralympics appearances (overview)
- 2012; 2016; 2020; 2024

Liberia competed at the 2012 Summer Paralympics in London, United Kingdom from August 29 to September 9, 2012.

== Powerlifting ==
Men

Athlete	Event	Result	Rank
James Siaffa	-82.5kg	190	7

== See also ==
- Liberia at the Paralympics
- Liberia at the 2012 Summer Olympics
