= Yang Yan (powerlifter) =

Chinese paralympic powerlifter

Personal information
- Born: 13 November 1985 (age 40)

Sport
- Country: China
- Sport: Powerlifting
Medal record
Powerlifting
Representing China
Paralympic Games
Silver medal – second place	2012 London	Women's 60 kg
Bronze medal – third place	2004 Athens	Women's 52 kg
Bronze medal – third place	2016 Rio de Janeiro	Women's 61 kg
Asian Para Games
Gold medal – first place	2014 Incheon	Women's 61 kg

Yang Yan (born 13 November 1985) is a Chinese paralympic powerlifter. She participated at the 2004 Summer Paralympics in the powerlifting competition, being awarded the bronze medal in the women's 52 kg event. Yan also participated at the 2012 Summer Paralympics in the powerlifting competition, being awarded the silver medal in the women's 60 kg event. She participated at the 2016 Summer Paralympics in the powerlifting competition, being awarded the bronze medal in the women's 61 kg event.
