= James Siaffa =

Liberian Paralympic powerlifter

Personal information
- Nickname: Bobby the Big
- Born: 24 April 1980 (age 46) Grand Bassa County, Liberia

Sport
- Country: Liberia
- Sport: Paralympic powerlifting
- Event: 2012 Summer Paralympics

James Bobby Siaffa (born 24 April 1980), also known as Bobby the Big, is a Liberian Paralympic powerlifter. He is the first athlete of any sport to represent Liberia at the Paralympics.

== Biography ==
Siaffa was born on 24 April 1980 in Grand Bassa County. He first started powerlifting in 1995. Siaffa made his international debut in the world of powerlifting on 28 May in the 2010 World Para Powerlifting Organization 2nd FAZZA International in Dubai. Siaffa ranked 6th in the competition. On 25 February 2012, during the 2012 FAZZA International Powerlifting Competition in Dubai, one of Siaffa's urine samples tested positive for a substance prohibited by the World Anti-Doping Agency. While Siaffa initially faced the potential of a two-year sanction for the positive test, two factors reduced the sanction to three months instead: the fact that Siaffa had included information about the use of a painkiller he had taken on his doping control form and a letter from his pharmacist, explaining that he was prescribed the painkiller which was thought to be allowed to treat a dislocated shoulder. The sanction took effect on 26 March 2012, as that was the date Siaffa was made aware of the violation.

In the 2012 Summer Paralympics in London, Siaffa became the first athlete to represent Liberia in the Paralympics. He also served as the flag bearer for his country in the parade of nations. Ultimately, on 4 September 2012, Siaffa ranked 7th in the men's 82.5 kg powerlifting event. There, he achieved his personal record, benching 419 lbs. In 2016, Siaffa wrote a letter to the International Paralympic Committee outlining his dissatisfaction with the Liberia National Paralympic Committee (LNPC). The letter alleged that while he was willing to compete in the Paralympics in Rio that year, he was uncomfortable with the leadership of the LNPC, and had faced verbal abuse among other poor treatment at their hands. LNPC General-Secretary Festus Robinson, who was one of the officials accused of abuse, accused Kotie Mawolo, with whom he had long standing conflict, of being the true author of the letter. Robinson believed that Mawolo had only gotten Siaffa to sign it. Liberia did not end up competing in the 2016 Paralympic Games, as the government was unable to provide the funds for the trip.

Siaffa initially planned to compete in the 2018 World Para Powerlifting African Championship in Algiers, but a minor wrist injury he received when getting off the plane to Algeria prevented him from doing so.
