= Majid Farzin =

Iranian Paralympic powerlifter

Personal information
- Nationality: Iranian
- Born: 29 April 1984 (age 42) Bileh Suvar, Ardabil Province
- Weight: 80.44 kg (177.3 lb)

Sport
- Sport: Paralympic powerlifting, Bench Press
Medal record
Men's Paralympic powerlifting
Representing Iran
Paralympic Games
Gold medal – first place	2012 London	82.5 kg
Gold medal – first place	2016 Rio de Janeiro	80 kg
Silver medal – second place	2008 Beijing	75 kg
World Championships
Gold medal – first place	2010 Kuala Lumpur	75 kg
Asian Para Games
Gold medal – first place	2010 Guangzhou	75 kg
Silver medal – second place	2014 Incheon	80 kg

Majid Farzin (born 29 April 1984) is an Iranian powerlifter and has a Guinness World Record in Powerlifting in 2017. At the 2012 Summer Paralympics he won gold medal at the -82.5 kg category, with 237 kg.
