= Shaaban Ibrahim =

Egyptian Paralympic powerlifter

Sport
- Country: Egypt
- Sport: Paralympic powerlifting
Medal record
Paralympic Games
Bronze medal – third place	2008 Beijing	60 kg
Bronze medal – third place	2012 London	67.5 kg
Bronze medal – third place	2016 Rio de Janeiro	65 kg
World Championships
Bronze medal – third place	2010 Kuala Lumpur	67.5 kg
Bronze medal – third place	2014 Dubai	65 kg
Bronze medal – third place	2021 Tbilisi	72 kg

Shaaban Ibrahim is an Egyptian Paralympic powerlifter. He represented Egypt at the Summer Paralympics three times: in 2008, 2012 and 2016. He won a bronze medal on each occasion; he won bronze in the men's 60 kg event in 2008, in the men's 67.5 kg event in 2012 and in the men's 65 kg event in 2016.

At the 2014 Powerlifting World Championships held in Dubai, United Arab Emirates, he won the bronze medal in the men's 65 kg event. In 2021, he won the bronze medal in the men's 72 kg event at the World Para Powerlifting Championships held in Tbilisi, Georgia.
