= Powerlifting at the 2004 Summer Paralympics – Women's 52 kg =

Women's Up To 52 kg at the XII Paralympic Games
- Paralympic Powerlifting
- Venue: Nikaia Olympic Weightlifting Hall
- Dates: 21 September 2004
- Competitors: 8 from 8 nations
- Winning weight(kg): 127.5

Medalists
1st place, gold medalist(s)		Tamara Podpalnaya	Russia
2nd place, silver medalist(s)		Abir Nail	Egypt
3rd place, bronze medalist(s)		Yang Yan	China

The Women's 52 kg powerlifting event at the 2004 Summer Paralympics was competed on 21 September. It was won by Tamara Podpalnaya, representing Russia.

== Final round ==
21 Sept. 2004, 13:45

Rank	Athlete	Weight(kg)	Notes
1st place, gold medalist(s)	Tamara Podpalnaya (RUS)	127.5	
2nd place, silver medalist(s)	Abir Nail (EGY)	107.5	
3rd place, bronze medalist(s)	Yang Yan (CHN)	102.5	
4	Annah Mooketshi (RSA)	87.5	
5	Martine Servajean (FRA)	85.0	
6	Fatama Allawi (JOR)	80.0	
	Natali Elias (SYR)	NMR	
	Iyabo Ismaila (NGR)	NMR	
