= Powerlifting at the 2012 Summer Paralympics – Women's 44 kg =

Powerlifting – Women's 44 kg at the XIV Paralympic Games
- Venue: ExCeL London
- Date: 31 August 2012
- Competitors: 8 from 8 nations

Medalists
1st place, gold medalist(s)		Ivory Nwokorie	Nigeria
2nd place, silver medalist(s)		Çiğdem Dede	Turkey
3rd place, bronze medalist(s)		Lidiia Soloviova	Ukraine

The women's 44 kg powerlifting event at the 2012 Summer Paralympics was contested on 31 August at ExCeL London.

== Records ==
Prior to the competition, the existing world and Paralympic records were as follows.

World record	127.5 kg	Lucy Ejike (NGR)	Athens, Greece	20 September 2004
Paralympic record	127.5 kg	Lucy Ejike (NGR)	Athens, Greece	20 September 2004

== Results ==
Rank	Name	Body weight (kg)	Attempts (kg)				Result (kg)
Rank	Name	Body weight (kg)	1	2	3	4	Result (kg)
1st place, gold medalist(s)	Ivory Nwokorie (NGR)	43.10	109.0	~~113.0~~	~~113.0~~	–	109.0
2nd place, silver medalist(s)	Çiğdem Dede (TUR)	42.98	~~106.0~~	105.0	~~100.0~~	–	105.0
3rd place, bronze medalist(s)	Lidiia Soloviova (UKR)	43.43	100.0	~~103.0~~	~~104.0~~	–	100.0
4	Zeinab Oteify (EGY)	42.76	~~95.0~~	~~95.0~~	95.0	–	95.0
5	Justyna Kozdryk (POL)	43.21	95.0	~~100.0~~	~~100.0~~	–	95.0
6	Achelle Guion (PHI)	43.88	70.0	~~75.0~~	~~75.0~~	–	70.0
7	Kabira Askarova (KAZ)	43.97	65.0	~~68.0~~	~~71.0~~	–	65.0
8	Laura Cerero Gabriel (MEX)	43.19	~~100.0~~	~~100.0~~	~~103.0~~	–	–
