= Nader Moradi =

Iranian Paralympic powerlifter

Personal information
- Born: 21 September 1982 (age 43)

Sport
- Country: Iran
- Sport: Men's para powerlifting
Medal record
Paralympic Games
Gold medal – first place	2012 London	60 kg
World Championships
Gold medal – first place	2017 Mexico City	72 kg
Silver medal – second place	2019 Nur-Sultan	72 kg
Bronze medal – third place	2010 Kuala Lumpur	56 kg
Asian Para Games
Silver medal – second place	2010 Guangzhou	60 kg
Silver medal – second place	2018 Jakarta	80 kg

Nader Moradi (born 21 September 1982) is an Iranian Paralympic powerlifter. He represented Iran at the 2012 Summer Paralympics and he won the gold medal in the men's 60 kg (130 lb) event.

He won the gold medal in the men's 72 kg (159 lb) event at the 2017 World Para Powerlifting Championships held in Mexico City, Mexico. At the 2019 World Para Powerlifting Championships held in Nur-Sultan, Kazakhstan, he won the silver medal in this event.
