= Çiğdem Dede =

Turkish Paralympic powerlifter

Personal information
- Nationality: Turkish
- Born: 27 February 1980 (age 46) Gaziantep, Turkey
- Weight: 43 kg (95 lb) (2012)

Sport
- Country: Turkey
- Sport: Powerlifting
- Event: 44 kg
- Club: Ankara Guven Spor
- Coached by: Emrah Arslan

Achievements and titles
- Paralympic finals: 2012
- Personal best: 106.0 kg (2012)
Medal record
Women's powerlifting
Representing Turkey
Paralympic Games
| Silver medal – second place | 2012 London | −44 kg |

Çiğdem Dede (born 27 February 1980, in Gaziantep, Turkey) is a Turkish powerlifter competing in the −44 kg division. She won the silver medal at the 2012 Paralympics. She is a dwarf athlete of Ankara Guven Spor, where she is coached by Mustafa Doğan.

She became paralyzed at the age of six due to wrong injection given to her leg.

== Career history ==
Çiğdem Dede is high school graduate. She began powerlifting by chance, encouraged by a weightlifting coach in 2009, and then received the support of her family. That year, Dede ranked fourth at the IPC World Championship. She became national champion in 2010 and 2011. At the 2011 Fazaa International Powerlifting Tournament in Dubai, United Arab Emirates, she took the gold medal lifting 100.0 kg.

== Achievements ==
| Year | Competition | Venue | Position | Event | Notes |
Representing Turkey
| 2011 | Fazaa International Powerlifting Tournament | Dubai, United Arab Emirates | 1st | −44 kg | 100 kg |
| 2012 | Summer Paralympics | London, United Kingdom | 2nd | −44 kg | 100 kg |
