= Tamara Podpalnaya =

Russian Paralympic powerlifter

Personal information
- Nationality: Russian
- Born: January 3, 1972 (age 54)
- Spouse: Andrey Podpalny

Sport
- Country: Russia
- Sport: Paralympic powerlifting
- Disability: short stature
- Event: 52 kg - 61 kg
- Coached by: Andrey Podpalny
Medal record
Women's powerlifting
Representing Russia
Summer Paralympics
| Gold medal – first place | Sydney 2000 | 52 kg |
| Gold medal – first place | Athens 2004 | 52 kg |
| Silver medal – second place | Beijing 2008 | 52 kg |
| Silver medal – second place | London 2012 | 52 kg |
IPC Powerlifting World Championships
| Gold medal – first place | Kuala Lumpur 2002 | 52 kg |
| Gold medal – first place | Kuala Lumpur | 52 kg |
| Silver medal – second place | Busan 2006 | 56 kg |
| Bronze medal – third place | 2021 Tbilisi | 55 kg |
IPC European Powerlifting Championships
| Gold medal – first place | Europe 2013 | 55 kg |
| Gold medal – first place | Europe 2015 | 55 kg |

Tamara Podpalnaya (born January 3, 1972) is a Russian Paralympic powerlifter. She has represented Russia at the Paralympics in 2000, 2004, 2008 and in 2012. Tamara Podpalnaya has won a tally of 4 medals including 2 gold and silver medals for Russia in the Paralympic event since making her debut in the 2000 Summer Paralympics held in Melbourne.

== Biography ==
She took the sport of powerlifting in 1997 soon after becoming a mother at the age of 23. She was married to Andrey Podpalny who is a weightlifter and a professional powerlifting coach. Her husband has been coaching the powerlifting sport for her since 1997 after giving birth to a daughter. Her daughter, Uliana Podpalnaya is a Para athlete who has also won a bronze medal in the 2016 IPC European Athletics shot put event. Tamara also holds the title of Honoured Masters of Sport of the USSR.

In 2021, she won the bronze medal in her event at the 2021 World Para Powerlifting Championships held in Tbilisi, Georgia.
