= Ali Hosseini (powerlifter) =

Iranian Paralympic powerlifter

Personal information
- Born: 21 March 1977 (age 49)

Sport
- Country: Iran
- Sport: Paralympic powerlifting
Medal record
Paralympic Games
Gold medal – first place	2012 London	75 kg
Silver medal – second place	2008 Beijing	67.5 kg
World Championships
Silver medal – second place	2002 Kuala Lumpur	56 kg
Asian Para Games
Silver medal – second place	2010 Guangzhou	67.5kg

Ali Hosseini (born 21 March 1977) is an Iranian Paralympic powerlifter. He represented Iran at the 2004 Summer Paralympics, at the 2008 Summer Paralympics and at the 2012 Summer Paralympics and he won two medals: the silver medal in the men's 67.5 kg event in 2008 and the gold medal in the men's 75 kg event in 2012.

At the 2015 IPC Powerlifting European Open Championships held in Eger, Hungary, he won the silver medal in the men's 80 kg event.
