= Powerlifting at the 2012 Summer Paralympics – Women's 60 kg =

Powerlifting – Women's 60 kg at the XIV Paralympic Games
- Venue: ExCeL London
- Date: 2 September 2012
- Competitors: 8 from 8 nations
- Winning lift: 135.5 kg

Medalists
1st place, gold medalist(s)		Amalia Pérez	Mexico
2nd place, silver medalist(s)		Yan Yang	China
3rd place, bronze medalist(s)		Amal Mahmoud	Egypt

The women's 60 kg powerlifting event at the 2012 Summer Paralympics was contested on 2 September at ExCeL London.

== Records ==
Prior to the competition, the existing world and Paralympic records were as follows.

World record	136.0 kg	Souhad Ghazouani (FRA)	Kuala Lumpur, Malaysia	28 July 2010
Paralympic record	135.0 kg	Bian Jianxin (CHN)	Beijing, China	13 September 2008

== Results ==
Rank	Name	Body weight (kg)	Attempts (kg)				Result (kg)
Rank	Name	Body weight (kg)	1	2	3	4	Result (kg)
1st place, gold medalist(s)	Amalia Pérez (MEX)	57.68	127.0	132.0	135.5	~~136.5~~	135.5
2nd place, silver medalist(s)	Yan Yang (CHN)	59.66	~~119.0~~	119.0	125.0	–	125.0
3rd place, bronze medalist(s)	Amal Mahmoud (EGY)	58.55	118.0	~~123.0~~	~~124.0~~	–	118.0
4	Kheda Berieva (RUS)	59.60	101.0	~~106.0~~	106.0	–	106.0
5	Dhikra Saleem (IRQ)	59.85	101.0	~~104.0~~	~~104.0~~	–	101.0
6	Fatima Bahji (MAR)	57.61	88.0	90.0	~~95.0~~	–	90.0
7	Hyun Hee Choi (KOR)	58.81	80.0	~~85.0~~	85.0	–	85.0
–	Ya-Hsuan Lin (TPE)	59.51	~~85.0~~	~~85.0~~	~~85.0~~	–	NMR
