= Liberia at the 2020 Summer Paralympics =

- IPC code: LBR

in Tokyo
- Competitors: 2 in 1 sport
- Medals: Gold - Silver - Bronze - Total

Summer appearances
- 2012; 2016; 2020; 2024

Liberia competed at the 2020 Summer Paralympics in Tokyo, Japan, from 24 August to 5 September 2021.

== Athletics ==
Men's field

Athlete	Event	Final	
Athlete	Event	Distance	Position
Thomas Mulbah	Javelin Throw F57	13.54	11

Women's field

Athlete	Event	Final	
Athlete	Event	Distance	Position
Patience Johnson	Javelin Throw F56	10.03	9

== See also ==
- Liberia at the 2020 Summer Olympics
