= Para powerlifting classification =

Disability sport classification

Para powerlifting classification is the system designed for Para powerlifting to ensure that there is level competition across a range of disabilities. Categories are broken down based on weight. The sport's classification is governed by International Paralympic Committee Powerlifting. People with physical disabilities are eligible to compete in this sport.

== Definition ==
Powerlifting classification at the Paralympic Games is the basis for determining who can compete in the sport, and within which weight class. The purpose of classification is to allow athletes to compete fairly against each other. Entry is eligible to athletes who, through physical impairment to the legs or hips are unable to compete in able-bodied competition. Athletes are classified based on their body weight.

== Governance ==
The sport's classification is governed by International Paralympic Committee Powerlifting. IPC Powerlifting is responsible for the rules and regulations governing powerlifting classification: the most recent of which were published in the IPC Powerlifting: Classification Rules and Regulations handbook of 2011. In Australia, the Australian Paralympic Committee is the National Federation for powerlifting. In 1983, the rules for this sport and approval for classification was done by the International Powerlifting Federation.

== Eligibility ==
As of 2012, people with physical disabilities are eligible to compete in this sport. Athletes must have an impairment in the hips or legs which prevents them from competing in able-bodied competition. This includes lower limb amputees, people with cerebral palsy or spinal injuries, and les autres who are classified as having a disability. Lifters must have both arms and be able to lift with no more than a loss of 20 degrees on full extension of both elbows. In 1983, Cerebral Palsy International Sports and Recreation Association (CP-ISRA) set the eligibility rules for classification for this sport. They defined cerebral palsy as a non-progressive brain lesion that results in impairment. People with cerebral palsy or non-progressive brain damage were eligible for classification by them. The organisation also dealt with classification for people with similar impairments. For their classification system, people with spina bifida were not eligible unless they had medical evidence of loco-motor dysfunction. People with cerebral palsy and epilepsy were eligible provided the condition did not interfere with their ability to compete. People who had strokes were eligible for classification following medical clearance. Competitors with multiple sclerosis, muscular dystrophy and arthrogryposis were not eligible for classification by CP-ISRA, but were eligible for classification by International Sports Organisation for the Disabled for the Games of Les Autres.

== History ==
In 1983, classification for cerebral palsy competitors in this sport was done by the Cerebral Palsy International Sports and Recreation Association. Classification was done at this time based on weight. By the early 1990s, powerlifting classification had moved away from medical based system to a functional classification system. Because of issues in objectively identifying functionality that plagued the post Barcelona Games, the IPC unveiled plans to develop a new classification system in 2003. This classification system went into effect in 2007, and defined ten different disability types that were eligible to participate on the Paralympic level. It required that classification be sport specific, and served two roles. The first was that it determined eligibility to participate in the sport and that it created specific groups of sportspeople who were eligible to participate and in which class. The IPC left it up to International Federations to develop their own classification systems within this framework, with the specification that their classification systems use an evidence based approach developed through research.

== Classes ==
Classification for Para powerlifters is based on the bodyweight of athletes. This means that athletes with different physical impairments compete in the same events. In 1983, there were five cerebral palsy classifications.

== Process ==
For Australian competitors in this sport, the sport and classification is managed by the Australian Paralympic Committee. There are three types of classification available for Australian competitors: Provisional, national and international. The first is for club level competitions, the second for state and national competitions, and the third for international competitions.

== At the Paralympic Games ==
The sport was introduced to the Paralympics at the 1964 Summer Paralympics for men and at the 2000 Summer Paralympics for women. Only wheelchair classified athletes were eligible to compete at the 1964 Summer Paralympics in Tokyo in this sport. This continued at the 1968 Summer Paralympics in Tel Aviv. Competitors with cerebral palsy classifications were allowed to compete at the Paralympics for the first time at the 1984 Summer Paralympics. At the 1992 Summer Paralympics, all disability types were eligible to participate, with classification being run through the International Paralympic Committee and the International Blind Sports Association, with classification being done based on blindness and or weight. At the 2000 Summer Paralympics, 44 assessments were conducted at the Games. This resulted in 1 class change, which was PPS protested by a national Paralympic committee and the classification was upheld. For the 2016 Summer Paralympics in Rio, the International Paralympic Committee had a zero classification at the Games policy. This policy was put into place in 2014, with the goal of avoiding last minute changes in classes that would negatively impact athlete training preparations. All competitors needed to be internationally classified with their classification status confirmed prior to the Games, with exceptions to this policy being dealt with on a case-by-case basis. In case there was a need for classification or reclassification at the Games despite best efforts otherwise, powerlifting classification was scheduled for September 7 at Riocentro-Pavilion 2.

== Future ==
Going forward, disability sport's major classification body, the International Paralympic Committee, is working on improving classification to be more of an evidence-based system as opposed to a performance-based system so as not to punish elite athletes whose performance makes them appear in a higher class alongside competitors who train less.
