= Nigeria at the 2012 Summer Paralympics =

- IPC code: NGR
- NPC: Nigeria Paralympic Committee

in London
- Competitors: 27
- Medals Ranked 22nd: Gold 6 Silver 5 Bronze 2 Total 13

Summer Paralympics appearances (overview)
- 1992; 1996; 2000; 2004; 2008; 2012; 2016; 2020; 2024

Nigeria competed at the 2012 Summer Paralympics in London, United Kingdom from 29 August – 9 September 2012. Nigerian Paralympians combined won more medals than their Olympic counterparts in London, winning 6 golds, 5 silvers and 2 bronze medals.

The 2012 Paralympic Games played an important role in Nigerian society in terms of assisting in changing people's attitudes towards people with disabilities. In some cases, this allowed Nigerian medalists to return home and be the primary breadwinner for their families.

Powerlifting was Nigeria's dominant sport in London. Following the team's success in the sport, Sports Minister Bolaji Abdullahi was quoted as saying that additional money would be funneled to the sport to build on the country's success in it

== Background ==
Babagana Ali was quoted by the BBC as saying of the 2012 Paralympics, "Paralympics is a clear indication to disabled persons in Nigeria and Africa alike that they can something good with their lives better than begging. [...] It also challenges African leaders to assist people with disability because they can equally bring pride to their countries."

In many parts of Black Africa, people who have disabilities that include insanity, and physical disabilities such as impairments and deformities often face cultural barriers to participation because of attitudes related to their disabilities. These include beliefs that they acquired their disabilities because their parents were witches or they are wizards. Their disability is often seen as a result of a personal failing on their part. As such, there is often tremendous cultural pressure for people with physical disabilities to remain hidden and out of the public eye. In many places, they are perceived to be monsters in need of healing. This is the context to which Nigerian Paralympians engage both society and sport internally, in their own country.

Following the success of the Nigerian team at the Paralympics in recent cycles, there were some changes in attitudes towards people with disabilities in the country. An idealized body in a Nigerian context sometimes became a superperson in their cyborg body, overcoming problems with corruption, lack of funding and other barriers to succeed at the highest level in society.

Nigeria was also a beneficiary of the London Organising Committee of the Olympic and Paralympic Games (LOCOG)'s International Inspiration project as part of the LOCOG's efforts to leave a lasting impact as a result of the city hosting the Olympic and Paralympic Games. A program was held in the country to train educators and coaches on how to be inclusive of people with disabilities and girls when delivering physical education programs. The program estimated 220,00 children would benefit from their efforts. 800 teachers and coaches were trained when the program was active.

== Medals summary ==
Nigeria's Paralympic team in London won more medals than Nigeria's Olympic team in London. The country's Olympians failed to pick up a single medal.

Medal	Name	Sport	Event	Date
Gold	Yakubu Adesokan	Powerlifting	Men's 48 kg	30 August
Gold	Ivory Nwokorie	Powerlifting	Women's 44 kg	31 August
Gold	Esther Oyema	Powerlifting	Women's 48 kg	1 September
Gold	Joy Onaolapo	Powerlifting	Women's 52 kg	1 September
Gold	Loveline Obiji	Powerlifting	Women's 82.5 kg	4 September
Gold	Grace Anozie	Powerlifting	Women's +82.5 kg	5 September
Silver	Ikechukwu Obichukwu	Powerlifting	Men's 52 kg	31 August
Silver	Anthony Ulonnam	Powerlifting	Men's 56 kg	31 August
Silver	Ifeanyi Nnajiofor	Powerlifting	Men's 60 kg	1 September
Silver	Lucy Ejike	Powerlifting	Women's 56 kg	2 September
Silver	Folashade Oluwafemiayo	Powerlifting	Women's 75 kg	3 September
Bronze	Eucharia Iyiazi	Athletics	Women's shot put F57-F58	8 September
Bronze	Victoria Nneji	Powerlifting	Women's 67.5 kg	3 September

== Athletics ==
Eucharia Djelal won a bronze medal for Nigeria in the Women's Shot Put F57/58 event on September 6.

== Powerlifting ==
Nigeria competed in powerlifting at the Barcelona Games, making their Paralympic debut in the sport. By the end of the London Games, Norwegian powerlifters had amassed 15 Paralympic golds since they first started competing in the sport at the 1992 Paralympic Games in Barcelona. They left London with 12 medals in the sport. Following the Games, Sports Minister Bolaji Abdullahi was quoted as saying that additional money would be funneled to the sport to build on the country's success in it.
