= Hamzeh Mohammadi =

Iranian Paralympic powerlifter

Sport
- Country: Iran
- Sport: Paralympic powerlifting
Medal record
Paralympic Games
Gold medal – first place	2008 Beijing	60 kg
Bronze medal – third place	2004 Athens	67.5 kg
World Championships
Gold medal – first place	2010 Kuala Lumpur	60 kg
Silver medal – second place	2014 Dubai	59 kg
Asian Para Games
Gold medal – first place	2010 Guangzhou	60 kg
Silver medal – second place	2014 Incheon	59 kg
Bronze medal – third place	2018 Jakarta	65 kg

Hamzeh Mohammadi is an Iranian Paralympic powerlifter. He represented Iran at the 2004 Summer Paralympics, at the 2008 Summer Paralympics and at the 2016 Summer Paralympics and he won two medals: the bronze medal in the men's 67.5 kg event in 2004 and the gold medal in the men's 60 kg event in 2008.

At the 2014 World Championships held in Dubai, United Arab Emirates, he won the silver medal in the men's 59 kg event.
