= Ayrat Zakiev =

Russian Paralympic powerlifter

Sport
- Country: Russia
- Sport: Paralympic powerlifting
Medal record
Paralympic Games
Silver medal – second place	2008 Beijing	60 kg
World Championships
Silver medal – second place	2010 Kuala Lumpur	60 kg
Silver medal – second place	2014 Dubai	65 kg

Ayrat Zakiev is a Russian Paralympic powerlifter. He represented Russia at the 2008 Summer Paralympics and at the 2012 Summer Paralympics and he won the silver medal in the men's 60 kg event in 2008.

At the 2013 IPC Open European Powerlifting Championships he won the gold medal in the men's 65 kg event.

At the 2014 World Championships held in Dubai, United Arab Emirates, he won the silver medal in the men's 65 kg event.
