= 2025 Asian Youth Para Games =

Event for athletes with physical disabilities

V Asian Youth Para Games
- Host city: Dubai
- Country: United Arab Emirates
- Motto: Born to Rise
- Teams: 35
- Athletes: 1,312
- Events: 497 in 11 sports
- Opening: 10 December 2025
- Closing: 13 December 2025
- Website: dubai-aypg2025.ae

The 2025 Asian Youth Para Games (Arabic: الألعاب الأسيوية البارالمبية للشباب 2025), officially known as the 5th Asian Youth Para Games, was an Asian youth disabled multi-sport event held in Dubai, United Arab Emirates from 7 to 14 December 2025, with 4 competition days. This was the second time Dubai has hosted the games. 1,312 Athletes from 35 participating nations participated in the games, featuring 11 sports.

== Host selection ==
On 3 August 2023, the Asian Paralympic Committee awarded the 2025 Asian Youth Para Games hosting rights to Tashkent, Uzbekistan. This would mark the first time that the Asian Youth Games and Para Games will be hosted in the same city under the same Organising Committee, following the format of Asian Games and Asian Para Games. However, after Tashkent's exit as hosts, Dubai was awarded the hosting rights for the 2025 edition.

== Sports ==
1. Boccia (8)
2. Goalball (2)
3. Para Archery (7)
4. Para Arm Wrestling (22)
5. Para Athletics (185) 2 Age Group
6. Para Badminton (18)
7. Para Powerlifting (41) 2 Age Group
8. Para Taekwondo (10)
9. Para Swimming (176) 2 Age Group
10. Para Table Tennis (25)
11. Wheelchair Basketball (2) (3 on 3) U23

== Mascot ==
Foxy was the Mascot of 2025 Asian Youth Para Games.

== Calendar ==
Date	Events
7 December	Arrival of athletes
8-13 December	Main Competition
14 December	Departure of athletes

== Participating nations ==
1,312 Participants from 35 different nations will take part in the Games.

1. Afghanistan (5)
2. Bangladesh (26)
3. Bahrain (12)
4. Bhutan (2)
5. Cambodia (23)
6. China (25)
7. Hong Kong (12)
8. Indonesia (58)
9. India (121)
10. Iran (194)
11. Iraq (32)
12. Japan (41)
13. Jordan (1)
14. Kazakhstan (71)
15. Kyrgyzstan (25)
16. Malaysia (30)
17. Maldives (4)
18. Mongolia (18)
19. Myanmar (1)
20. Nepal (8)
21. Oman (1)
22. Pakistan (8)
23. North Korea (5)
24. Philippines (49)
25. Saudi Arabia (53)
26. Singapore (16)
27. South Korea (61)
28. Sri Lanka (10)
29. Syria (24)
30. Tajikistan (18)
31. Chinese Taipei (25)
32. Thailand (122)
33. United Arab Emirates (57) (Host)
34. Uzbekistan (107)
35. Yemen (2)

=== Did not enter ===
10 Nations did not enter:

1. Brunei
2. Laos
3. Macau
4. Palestine
5. Qatar
6. Kuwait
7. Turkmenistan
8. Vietnam
9. Lebanon
10. Timor-Leste

== Medal table ==
* Host nation (United Arab Emirates)

2025 Asian Youth Para Games medal list
Rank	Nation	Gold	Silver	Bronze	Total
1	Uzbekistan	125	77	52	254
2	Iran	73	91	98	262
3	Japan	48	26	16	90
4	India	38	32	40	110
5	Thailand	37	37	33	107
6	Indonesia	31	34	24	89
7	Kazakhstan	27	22	21	70
8	South Korea	17	14	14	45
9	Malaysia	15	12	15	42
10	Chinese Taipei	14	16	8	38
11	Saudi Arabia	11	18	12	41
12	Iraq	10	8	16	34
13	Philippines	8	13	10	31
14	United Arab Emirates*	7	8	9	24
15	Kyrgyzstan	7	0	3	10
16	China	6	4	7	17
17	Cambodia	4	4	3	11
18	North Korea	4	0	0	4
19	Mongolia	3	3	2	8
20	Bangladesh	3	0	1	4
21	Singapore	2	6	4	12
22	Sri Lanka	2	1	1	4
23	Tajikistan	1	3	0	4
24	Nepal	1	1	0	2
25	Bahrain	1	0	2	3
26	Yemen	1	0	0	1
27	Hong Kong	0	3	0	3
28	Jordan	0	2	0	2
29	Bhutan	0	0	1	1
29	Maldives	0	0	1	1
Totals (30 entries)		496	435	393	1,324

Nations without medals (5): Pakistan, Oman, Myanmar, Syrian Arab Republic, Afghanistan.

== Results ==
=== Para Swimming ===
Rank	Nation	Gold	Silver	Bronze	Total
1	Uzbekistan	36	15	8	59
2	Japan	33	21	9	63
3	Iran	23	38	41	102
4	Kazakhstan	14	13	7	34
5	Thailand	13	19	17	49
6	Indonesia	11	11	4	26
7	Malaysia	10	8	7	25
8	India	7	5	6	18
9	South Korea	7	4	2	13
10	Chinese Taipei	7	3	1	11
11	Philippines	6	6	2	14
12	North Korea	3	0	0	3
13	Saudi Arabia	2	7	5	14
14	Singapore	2	3	3	8
15	Cambodia	1	0	2	3
16	Bangladesh	1	0	1	2
17	Iraq	0	2	3	5
18	Hong Kong	0	2	0	2
19	Kyrgyzstan	0	0	3	3
19	United Arab Emirates	0	0	3	3
21	Maldives	0	0	1	1
Totals (21 entries)		176	157	125	458

=== Para Athletics ===
Rank	Nation	Gold	Silver	Bronze	Total
1	Uzbekistan	62	39	26	127
2	Iran	22	29	26	77
3	Thailand	20	10	11	41
4	India	17	13	17	47
5	Indonesia	14	10	5	29
6	Iraq	8	3	5	16
7	Saudi Arabia	7	9	6	22
8	United Arab Emirates	6	8	3	17
9	South Korea	6	5	2	13
10	Japan	4	2	3	9
11	Cambodia	3	4	1	8
12	Kazakhstan	3	0	2	5
13	Philippines	2	4	3	9
14	Mongolia	2	3	1	6
15	Sri Lanka	2	1	1	4
16	Bangladesh	2	0	0	2
16	Malaysia	2	0	0	2
18	Chinese Taipei	1	5	3	9
19	Bahrain	1	0	1	2
20	Yemen	1	0	0	1
21	Jordan	0	2	0	2
22	Hong Kong	0	1	0	1
22	Singapore	0	1	0	1
Totals (23 entries)		185	149	116	450

=== Para Powerlifting ===
Rank	NPC	Gold	Silver	Bronze	Total
1	Uzbekistan (UZB)	21	14	8	43
2	Iran (IRI)	9	6	5	20
3	Indonesia (INA)	1	3	0	4
4	Kazakhstan (KAZ)	1	2	3	6
5	Iraq (IRQ)	1	1	2	4
6	Thailand (THA)	1	1	1	3
7	Tajikistan (TJK)	1	1	0	2
8	South Korea (KOR)	1	0	2	3
9	Mongolia (MGL)	1	0	0	1
10	Malaysia (MAS)	0	2	0	2
10	Saudi Arabia (KSA)	0	2	0	2
12	India (IND)	0	1	2	3
13	United Arab Emirates (UAE)	0	0	2	2
Totals (13 entries)		37	33	25	95

=== Para Armwrestling ===
Rank	Nation	Gold	Silver	Bronze	Total
1	Iran	8	12	12	32
2	Kyrgyzstan	7	0	0	7
3	Kazakhstan	4	3	4	11
4	Uzbekistan	3	4	2	9
5	Tajikistan	0	2	0	2
6	Thailand	0	1	0	1
Totals (6 entries)		22	22	18	62

=== Para Archery ===
Rank	NPC	Gold	Silver	Bronze	Total
1	China (CHN)	4	4	4	12
2	India (IND)	2	2	1	5
3	South Korea (KOR)	1	0	0	1
4	Thailand (THA)	0	1	0	1
5	Malaysia (MAS)	0	0	1	1
5	Philippines (PHI)	0	0	1	1
Totals (6 entries)		7	7	7	21

=== Para Taekwondo ===
Rank	Nation	Gold	Silver	Bronze	Total
1	Iran	4	3	2	9
2	Uzbekistan	3	4	7	14
3	China	2	0	3	5
4	Thailand	1	1	0	2
5	Kazakhstan	0	1	1	2
6	Iraq	0	1	0	1
7	India	0	0	2	2
8	Bahrain	0	0	1	1
8	Japan	0	0	1	1
8	Nepal	0	0	1	1
8	South Korea	0	0	1	1
Totals (11 entries)		10	10	19	39

=== Para Table Tennis ===
Rank	Nation	Gold	Silver	Bronze	Total
1	Japan	9	2	3	14
2	Chinese Taipei	4	6	3	13
3	Iran	4	0	10	14
4	Kazakhstan	3	2	4	9
5	Indonesia	2	4	8	14
6	India	1	6	4	11
7	Iraq	1	0	5	6
8	North Korea	1	0	0	1
9	Thailand	0	2	1	3
10	Philippines	0	1	4	5
11	Malaysia	0	1	0	1
11	Nepal	0	1	0	1
13	Saudi Arabia	0	0	1	1
13	United Arab Emirates	0	0	1	1
Totals (14 entries)		25	25	44	94

=== Para Badminton ===
Rank	Nation	Gold	Silver	Bronze	Total
1	India	11	5	8	24
2	Malaysia	3	0	6	9
3	Chinese Taipei	2	2	1	5
4	Indonesia	1	6	6	13
5	South Korea	1	3	4	8
6	Iraq	0	1	0	1
6	Philippines	0	1	0	1
8	Bhutan	0	0	1	1
8	Singapore	0	0	1	1
8	Thailand	0	0	1	1
Totals (10 entries)		18	18	28	64

=== Boccia ===
Rank	Nation	Gold	Silver	Bronze	Total
1	Indonesia	2	0	1	3
2	Japan	2	0	0	2
2	Saudi Arabia	2	0	0	2
4	South Korea	1	0	1	2
4	Thailand	1	0	1	2
6	Iran	0	2	0	2
6	Singapore	0	2	0	2
8	Malaysia	0	1	1	2
8	Uzbekistan	0	1	1	2
10	Kazakhstan	0	1	0	1
10	Philippines	0	1	0	1
12	Iraq	0	0	1	1
12	Mongolia	0	0	1	1
Totals (13 entries)		8	8	7	23

=== Goalball ===
Rank	Nation	Gold	Silver	Bronze	Total
1	Iran	2	0	2	4
2	Kazakhstan	2	0	0	2
3	South Korea	0	2	2	4
4	Thailand	0	2	0	2
Totals (4 entries)		4	4	4	12

=== Wheelchair Basketball ===
Rank	Nation	Gold	Silver	Bronze	Total
1	Iran	1	1	0	2
2	Thailand	1	0	1	2
3	Japan	0	1	0	1
Totals (3 entries)		2	2	1	5

No bronze was awarded to Bangladesh girls because only three teams participated.
