= Liu Lei (powerlifter) =

Chinese Paralympic powerlifter

Personal information
- Born: 16 November 1987 (age 38) Zaozhuang, China

Sport
- Country: China
- Sport: Paralympic powerlifting
Medal record
Paralympic Games
Gold medal – first place	2008 Beijing	75 kg
Gold medal – first place	2012 London	67.5 kg
Gold medal – first place	2016 Rio de Janeiro	72 kg
Gold medal – first place	2020 Tokyo	65 kg
World Championships
Gold medal – first place	2010 Kuala Lumpur	67.5 kg
Gold medal – first place	2014 Dubai	65 kg
Silver medal – second place	2017 Mexico City	65 kg
Asian Para Games
Gold medal – first place	2010 Guangzhou	67.5 kg
Gold medal – first place	2018 Jakarta	65 kg
Silver medal – second place	2014 Incheon	65 kg

Liu Lei (born 16 November 1987) is a Chinese Paralympic powerlifter. He won four consecutive gold medals at the Summer Paralympics. He also won two gold medals and one silver at the World Para Powerlifting Championships.

At the 2020 Summer Paralympics, he won a gold medal in the men's 65 kg event.
