= Victoria Nneji =

Nigerian Paralympic powerlifter

Personal information
- Nationality: Nigerian
- Born: 1972 (age 53–54)

Sport
- Sport: Powerlifting
Medal record
Representing Nigeria
Women's Powerlifting
Paralympic Games
Gold medal – first place	2000 Sydney	Women's 60kg
Silver medal – second place	2008 Beijing	Women's 67.5kg
Bronze medal – third place	2012 London	Women's 67.5kg

Victoria Nneji (born 1972) is a Nigerian former Paralympian powerlifter.She competed at the Summer Paralympic Games from 2000 to 2012 and achieved three medals over that time. At the 2012 Women's Powerlifting 67.5kg event, she won a bronze medal. She soon after announced her retirement from competitive sports following the event, citing recurrent injuries and her advanced age as factors.
