= Ivory Nwokorie =

Nigerian Paralympic powerlifter

Personal information
- National team: Nigeria

Sport
- Country: Nigeria
- Sport: Powerlifting
- Weight class: 44 kg
Medal record
Representing Nigeria
Women's powerlifting
Paralympic Games
Gold medal – first place	London	44 kg
- Updated on 5 November 2017

Ivory Nwokorie MON is a Nigerian powerlifter who won the gold medal in the women's 44 kg weight class at the 2012 Summer Paralympics in London, England. She was banned for two years in 2013, after testing positive for Furosemide.

== Career ==
Ivory Nwokorie competed for Nigeria at the 2012 Summer Paralympics in London, England. After lifting 109 kilograms (240 lb), she won the gold medal. This was the second gold medal for Nigeria at the Games, which was more successful than at the 2012 Summer Olympics. Upon her return to Nigeria, she was named a Member of the Order of the Niger, alongside each of the other Nigerian gold medallists from the 2012 Paralympics. They were also each awarded five million Nigerian naira by the government, due to their success.

Nwokorie received a two-year ban and a fine of €1,500, after submitting a positive sample on 23 February 2013 at the 5th Fazaa International Powerlifting Competition. The sample tested positive for Furosemide, and the ban meant she was unable to compete between 19 April 2013 and 18 April 2015.
