= Fu Taoying =

Chinese Paralympic powerlifter

Personal information
- Nationality: Chinese
- Born: Nanjing, China

Sport
- Sport: powerlifting
Medal record
Powerlifting
Representing China
Summer Paralympics
Gold medal – first place	2004 Athens	Women's 60 kg
Gold medal – first place	2008 Beijing	Women's 67.5 kg
Gold medal – first place	2012 London	Women's 75 kg

Fu Taoying (Chinese: 傅桃英) is a Chinese powerlifter. She is the top medalist in women's paralympic powerlifting, having won four gold medals at the Summer Paralympics.
