= Malaysia at the 2025 Asian Youth Para Games =

- IPC code: MAS
- NPC: Paralympic Council Malaysia

in Dubai, United Arab Emirates 10–13 December 2025
- Competitors: 29 in 8 sports
- Flag bearer: Johannes Gabriel Chew
- Medals Ranked 9th: Gold 15 Silver 12 Bronze 15 Total 42

Asian Youth Para Games appearances
- 2009; 2013; 2017; 2021; 2025

Malaysia competed in the 2025 Asian Youth Para Games which held in Dubai, United Arab Emirates from 10 to 13 December 2025. Malaysia contingent has 29 athletes who compete in eight sports and was led by chef de mission of delegation, Joshua Edgar Mariyee Joseph.

== Competitors ==
The following is the list of number of competitors in the Games:

Sport	Boy	Girl	Total
Archery	2	0	2
Athletics	5	1	6
Badminton	3	2	5
Boccia	3	2	5
Powerlifting	2	0	2
Swimming	3	3	6
Table tennis	2	0	2
Taekwondo	1	0	1
Total	21	8	29

== Medalists ==
Medal	Name	Sport	Event	Date
Gold	Wahyu Eqwal Nazrey	Swimming	Boys' 50 m backstroke S1-5	11 December
Gold	Muhammad Nazri Hazim Mohan	Athletics	Boys' long jump T11, T12	12 December
Gold	Ahmed Shahputra Abdul Rahim; You Zhou Cheah	Badminton	Boys' doubles SH6	12 December
Gold	Siti Maisarah Mat Lawani	Badminton	Girls' singles SL3	12 December
Gold	Wahyu Eqwal Nazrey	Swimming	Boys' 50 m freestyle S5	12 December
Gold	Wahyu Eqwal Nazrey	Swimming	Boys' 100 m freestyle S5	12 December
Gold	Danish Haiqal Ahmad Firdaus	Swimming	Boys' 200 m individual medley SM14	12 December
Gold	Elysha Cheong Hui-yin	Swimming	Girls' 100 m freestyle S10	12 December
Gold	Elysha Cheong Hui-yin	Swimming	Girls' 400 m freestyle S10	12 December
Gold	Elysha Cheong Hui-yin	Swimming	Girls' 100 m butterfly S8-10	12 December
Gold	Elysha Cheong Hui-yin	Swimming	Girls' 100 m breaststroke SB9	12 December
Gold	Asyiil Raziin Razman	Swimming	Girls' 100 m breaststroke SB14	12 December
Gold	Asyiil Raziin Razman	Swimming	Girls' 200 m individual medley SM14	12 December
Gold	Nur Arisya Nabila Adi Fazril	Athletics	Girls' 1500 m T20	13 December
Silver	Johannes Gabriel Chew	Powerlifting	Boys' 65kg	11 December
Silver	Faris Iskandar Ahmad Zaini	Powerlifting	Boys' 80kg	11 December
Silver	Wahyu Eqwal Nazrey	Swimming	Boys' 50 m butterfly S2-7	11 December
Silver	Aliff Aldih	Table Tennis	Boys' singles Class 9	11 December
Silver	Danish Haiqal Ahmad Firdaus	Swimming	Boys' 400 m freestyle S14	12 December
Silver	Danish Haiqal Ahmad Firdaus	Swimming	Boys' 100 m breaststroke SB14	12 December
Silver	Wahyu Eqwal Nazrey	Swimming	Boys' 200 m Individual Medley SM5/6	12 December
Silver	Sharlinie Valerie Voo Wen Qin	Swimming	Girls' 50 m freestyle S3-6	12 December
Silver	Sharlinie Valerie Voo Wen Qin	Swimming	Girls' 100 m freestyle S6-7	12 December
Silver	Asyiil Raziin Razman	Swimming	Girls' 100 m freestyle S14	12 December
Silver	Sharlinie Valerie Voo Wen Qin	Swimming	Girls' 100 m backstroke S6-7	12 December
Silver	Avrinda Anis	Boccia	Girls' individual BC2	13 December
Bronze	Danish Haiqal Ahmad Firdaus	Swimming	Boys' 200 m freestyle S14	11 December
Bronze	Asyiil Raziin Razman	Swimming	Girls' 200 m freestyle S14	11 December
Bronze	Sharlinie Valerie Voo Wen Qin	Swimming	Girls' 50 m butterfly S2-7	11 December
Bronze	Muhammad Fakhrul Hakimie Mohd Fauzi	Archery	Boys' individual recurve open	12 December
Bronze	You Zhou Cheah; Gladys Grace Didin	Badminton	Mixed doubles SH6	12 December
Bronze	Danish Haiqal Ahmad Firdaus	Swimming	Boys' 100 m freestyle S14	12 December
Bronze	Muhammad Alif Sufi Muhammad Azizul	Swimming	Boys' 200 m individual medley SM14	12 December
Bronze	Sharlinie Valerie Voo Wen Qin	Swimming	Girls' 100 m breaststroke SB6-9	12 December
Bronze	Elysha Cheong Hui-yin	Swimming	Girls' 200 m individual medley SM9	12 December
Bronze	Nik Muhammad Hashraff Muazzam Mohd Hilmin	Badminton	Boys' singles SU5	13 December
Bronze	You Zhou Cheah	Badminton	Boys' singles SH6	13 December
Bronze	Nik Muhammad Hashraff Muazzam Mohd Hilmin; Siti Maisarah Mat Lawani	Badminton	Mixed doubles SL3-SU5	13 December
Bronze	Muhd Nur Sharizan Ikhwan	Boccia	Boys' individual BC1	13 December
