= Amalia Pérez =

Mexican Paralympic powerlifter

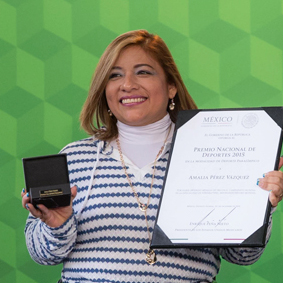

Personal information
- Full name: Amalia Pérez Vázquez
- Born: 10 July 1973 (age 53) Mexico City, Mexico

Sport
- Country: Mexico
- Sport: powerlifting
- Disability: Paraplegia
- Event: 44kg - 60kg
- Coached by: José Enrique Alvarado Paiz
Medal record
Women's powerlifting
Representing Mexico
Summer Paralympics
Gold medal – first place	2008 Beijing	52 kg
Gold medal – first place	2012 London	60 kg
Gold medal – first place	2016 Rio de Janeiro	55 kg
Gold medal – first place	2020 Tokyo	61 kg
Silver medal – second place	2000 Sydney	48 kg
Silver medal – second place	2004 Athens	48 kg
Bronze medal – third place	2024 Paris	–61 kg
Parapan American Games
Gold medal – first place	2007 Rio de Janeiro	52kg
Gold medal – first place	2011 Guadalajara	lightweight
Gold medal – first place	2015 Toronto	52kg
Gold medal – first place	2019 Lima	55kg

Amalia Pérez Vázquez (born 10 July 1973) is a Mexican powerlifter in the 44 kilograms (97 lb) - 60 kilograms (130 lb) bracket. She has four times been a Paralympic champion and is the only powerlifter in the world to have Paralympic champion in three divisions.

Pérez has been a member of the Mexican delegation to the Paralympic Games since 2000. It was her participation of 2000 Summer Paralympics that won Pérez her first silver medal in the 52 kilograms (115 lb) powerlifting event, and she would again win a silver medal in the 2004 Summer Paralympics in Athens, but this time in the 48 kilograms (106 lb) event. At the 2008 Summer Paralympics, Pérez won her first gold medal in the 52kg event and surpass the Pan-American record with a lifted weight of 127.5 kilograms (281 lb). She would do this again four years later at the 2012 Summer Paralympics, this time with a lifted weight of 135.5 kilograms (299 lb). In 2016, she won the gold medal in the women's 55 kg event at the 2016 Summer Paralympics held in Rio de Janeiro, Brazil. She also won the gold medal in the women's 61 kg event at the 2020 Summer Paralympics held in Tokyo, Japan.

At the continental level, Pérez won a gold medal 2007 Parapan American Games in Rio de Janeiro in the 52kg event and broke the world Paralympic powerlifting record with 130.5 kilograms (288 lb) on 14 August 2007. At the 2011 Parapan American Games held in Guadalajara, she received the gold medal in the women's 44kg - 60kg event.

In 2008, Pérez received the National Mexican Sports Award.

In 2021, she won the gold medal in her event at the 2021 World Para Powerlifting Championships held in Tbilisi, Georgia.

Paralympics
Preceded by Arly Velásquez	Flagbearer for Mexico (with Diego López Díaz); Tokyo 2020	Succeeded by Arly Velásquez
