= Para powerlifting =

Paralympic sport adaptation

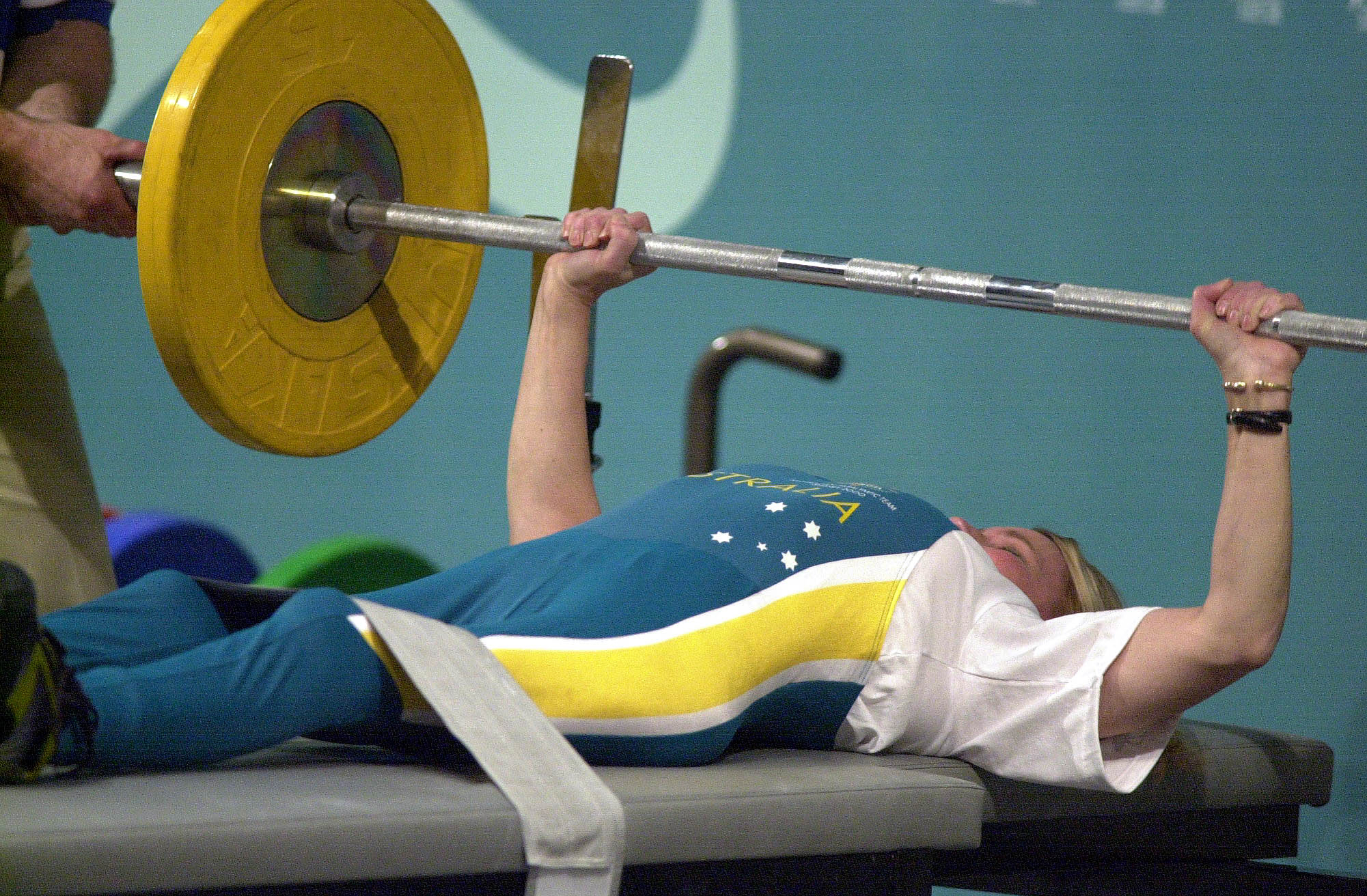
- Highest governing body: ISMGF (1964–1984); IPC Powerlifting (1984–2016); WPPO (2017–present)

Characteristics
- Mixed-sex: Yes
- Type: Indoor

Presence
- Paralympic: 1984

pictogram used for Powerlifting at the Summer Paralympics

Para powerlifting is an adaptation of the sport of powerlifting for athletes with disabilities. The only discipline in Paralympic powerlifting is the bench press. The sport is governed by the International Paralympic Committee (World Para Powerlifting) and is open to anyone with a minimum level of disability who can extend their arms within 20° of full extension during a lift. Powerlifting has been competed at the Summer Paralympics since 1984. Major competitions include the Paralympic Games and the biennial World Para Powerlifting Championships, and well as the annual World Cup, triennial regional Championships, and Grand Prix events.

== History at the Paralympics ==
Weightlifting made its Paralympic debut at the Tokyo 1964 Paralympic Games, allowing only males with spinal cord injuries to compete. Powerlifting was introduced at the 1984 Stoke Mandeville & New York Games and ever since then it has been included in the Paralympic programme. The first Paralympic powerlifting competition took place in New York, USA and featured athletes from six countries. At the Barcelona 1992 Paralympic Games, weightlifting was removed from the programme, while powerlifting remained with 25 competing countries. At the Atlanta 1996 Paralympic Games, the number of participating countries increased to 58.

The women’s category was introduced in the Sydney 2000 Paralympic Games. Para powerlifting was one of the first Paralympic sports to achieve complete gender parity, with an equal divide between male and female participation during the Tokyo 2020 Paralympic Games.

== Best and total medals ==
In 2022, WPPO initiated a new "total lift" medal, awarded for the sum of all good lifts from the three attempts.

Before 2022 medal awarded only in Best lifts. Since 2022 medal awarded in best lifts and total lifts. The World Para-powerlifting 2022 Asia Oceania Open Championships was held in Pyeongtaek, Korea from 15 – 20 June 2022. This was the first competition in history, in addition to the best lift, a total of three lifts were also awarded medals.

- 1964/1984 – 2021: Only best lifts have medals
- 2022–present: Best lifts and total lifts have medals

== Ages ==
From 2002 to 2021: Junior (U20) and Senior (+20)

Since 2022:

- Rookie (14–17)
- Next Gen (18–20)
- Elite (+20)
- Legends (+45)

Junior events were held for the first time in 2002 (or 2006) World Championships.

== Weight classes ==
=== 1984–2012 ===
There were twenty powerlifting events, corresponding to ten weight classes each for men and women.

Powerlifting at the 2012 Summer Paralympics - Weight Divisions
Men	Women
48 kg	40 kg
52 kg	44 kg
56 kg	48 kg
60 kg	52 kg
67.5 kg	56 kg
75 kg	60 kg
82.5 kg	67.5 kg
90 kg	75 kg
100 kg	82.5 kg
+100 kg	+82.5 kg

=== Since 2016 ===
There are twenty powerlifting events, corresponding to ten weight classes each for men and women. The weight categories were significantly adjusted after the 2012 Games.

Powerlifting at the 2016 Summer Paralympics - Weight Divisions
Men	Women
49 kg	41 kg
54 kg	45 kg
59 kg	50 kg
65 kg	55 kg
72 kg	61 kg
80 kg	67 kg
88 kg	73 kg
97 kg	79 kg
107 kg	86 kg
+107 kg	+86 kg

== Events ==
Events:

=== Global ===
- Powerlifting at the Summer Paralympics since 1984
- World Para Powerlifting Championships since 1994
- World Para Powerlifting World Cup (WPPO World Cup) since 2015
- Fazaa International Powerlifting Competition since 2009 (2013 not held)

=== Regional ===
2013, 2015, 2018. (IPC Powerlifting Open ... Championships)

- World Para Powerlifting European Open Championships since 2013
- World Para Powerlifting Asian Open Championships since 2013 (Asia-Oceania)
- World Para Powerlifting Americas Open Championships since 2015 (Pan American)
- World Para Powerlifting African Open Championships since 2015

Edition	Year	Host	Events	Athletes
1	2013 Asian	Kuala Lumpur, Malaysia	20	
2	2013 European	Aleksin, Russia	20	
3	2015 Americas	Mexico City, Mexico	20	
4	2015 Asian	Almaty, Kazakhstan	20	
5	2015 European	Eger, Hungary	20	
6	2015 African	Brazzaville, Congo	20	
7	2018 European	Berck, France	20	
8	2018 African	Algiers, Algeria	20	
9	2018 Asian	Kitakyushu, Japan	20	
10	2018 Americas	Bogotá, Colombia	20	

=== World Cup ===
up to 2016: IPC Powerlifting World Cup

- 2011 Mexican Powerlifting Competition
- 2011 Polish Cup Powerlifting-Bydgoszcz
- 2011 International Powerlifting Competition in Amman
- 2011 3rd Powerlifting Khorfakkan International Competition
- 2011 8th China National Games for the Disable
- 2011 International Powerlifting Competition in Hungary
- IWAS World Games 2011, 2021
- 2011 Malaysia Open Powerlifting Championships
- 2013 Open Misr Cup Powerlifting Championships
- Glasgow 2014 Commonwealth Games

Edition	Year	Host	Events	Athletes
-	2009 (1st FAZZA)	Dubai, United Arab Emirates	20	
-	2010 (2nd FAZZA)	Dubai, United Arab Emirates	20	
-	2011 (3rd FAZZA)	Dubai, United Arab Emirates	20	
-	2012 (4th FAZZA)	Dubai, United Arab Emirates	20	
-	2014 (5th FAZZA)	Dubai, United Arab Emirates	20	
1	2015 (6th FAZZA)	Dubai, United Arab Emirates	20	
2	2016	Rio de Janeiro, Brazil	20	
3	2016 (7th FAZZA)	Dubai, United Arab Emirates	20	
4	2016	Kuala Lumpur, Malaysia	20	
5	2017	Eger, Hugary	20	
6	2017 (8th FAZZA)	Dubai, United Arab Emirates	20	
7	2018 (9th FAZZA)	Dubai, United Arab Emirates	20	
8	2019 (10th FAZZA)	Dubai, United Arab Emirates	20	
9	2019	Eger, Hungary	20	
10	2019	Lima, Peru	20	
11	2019	Tokyo, Japan	20	
12	2020	Abuja, Nigeria	20	
13	2020	Manchester, United Kingdom	20	
14	2021	Bogotá, Colombia	20	
15	2021	Manchester, United Kingdom	20	
16	2021	Bangkok, Thailand	20	
17	2021	Tbilisi, Georgia	20	
18	2021 (11th FAZZA)	Dubai, United Arab Emirates	20	

== World records ==
World records in Paralympic powerlifting are ratified by the International Paralympic Committee.

=== Elite ===
Men

Category	Record	Athlete	Nationality	Date	Meet	Place	Ref
–49 kg	183.5 kg	Lê Văn Công	Vietnam	4 December 2017	World Championships	Mexico City, Mexico	
–54 kg	205 kg	Sherif Othman	Egypt	6 April 2014	World Championships	Dubai, United Arab Emirates	
–59 kg	212 kg	Mustafa Radhi	Iraq	19 October 2026	Asian Para Games	Nagoya, Japan	
–65 kg	222 kg	Zou Yi	China	24 October 2023	Asian Para Games	Hangzhou, China	
–72 kg	232 kg	Bonnie Bunyau Gustin	Malaysia	6 September 2024	Paralympic Games	Paris, France	
–80 kg	242 kg	Rouhollah Rostami	Iran	6 September 2024	Paralympic Games	Paris, France	
–88 kg	251 kg	Abdelkareem Khattab	Jordan	29 August 2023	World Championships	Dubai, United Arab Emirates	
–97 kg	260 kg	Abdelkareem Khattab	Jordan	7 September 2024	Paralympic Games	Paris, France	
–107 kg	255 kg	Aliakbar Gharibshahi	Iran	16 October 2025	World Championships	Cairo, Egypt	
+107 kg	310 kg	Siamand Rahman	Iran	14 September 2016	Paralympic Games	Rio de Janeiro, Brazil	

Women

Category	Record	Athlete	Nationality	Date	Meet	Place	Ref
–41 kg	123 kg	Guo Lingling	China	23 October 2023	Asian Para Games	Hangzhou, China	
–45 kg	126 kg	Guo Lingling	China	19 October 2026	Asian Para Games	Nagoya, Japan	
–50 kg	131 kg	Esther Oyema	Nigeria	10 April 2018	Commonwealth Games	Gold Coast, Australia	
–55 kg	135 kg	Rehab Ahmed	Egypt	22 June 2024	World Cup	(Georgia (country)) Tbilisi, Georgia	
–61 kg	150 kg	Onyinyechi Mark	Nigeria	6 September 2024	Paralympic Games	Paris, France	
–67 kg	148 kg	Onyinyechi Mark	Nigeria	23 May 2026	African Open Championships	Oran, Algeria	
–73 kg	152 kg	Ruza Kuzieva	Uzbekistan	21 October 2026	Asian Para Games	Nagoya, Japan	
–79 kg	158 kg	Rita Ferdinand	Nigeria	24 July 2026	Commonwealth Games	Glasgow, United Kingdom	
–86 kg	159 kg	Zheng Feifei	China	25 June 2024	World Cup	(Georgia (country)) Tbilisi, Georgia	
+86 kg	175 kg	Folashade Oluwafemiayo	Nigeria	24 July 2026	Commonwealth Games	Glasgow, United Kingdom	

=== Next Gen ===
Men

Category	Record	Athlete	Nationality	Date	Meet	Place	Ref
–49 kg	161 kg	Muslim Al-Sudani	Iraq	27 October 2022	African Open Championships	Cairo, Egypt	
–54 kg	152 kg	Gergő Szebenyi	Hungary	9 October 2025	Rookie and NextGen World Championships	Cairo, Egypt	
–59 kg	188 kg	Qi Yongkai	China	9 September 2018	Asia-Oceania Open Championships	Kitakyushu, Japan	
–65 kg	204 kg	Bonnie Bunyau Gustin	Malaysia	9 October 2018	Asian Para Games	Jakarta, Indonesia	
–72 kg	179 kg	Donato Telesca	Italy	26 April 2019	World Cup	Eger, Hungary	
–80 kg	170 kg	Islam Mohamed	Egypt	28 October 2022	African Open Championships	Cairo, Egypt	
–88 kg	176 kg	Mikołaj Wilkowski	Poland	6 March 2026	European Open Championships	(Georgia (country)) Tbilisi, Georgia	
–97 kg	195 kg	Reza Enayatollahi	Iran	10 October 2025	Rookie and NextGen World Championships	Cairo, Egypt	
–107 kg	205 kg	Reza Enayatollahi	Iran	12 December 2025	Asian Youth Para Games	Dubai, United Arab Emirates	
+107 kg	219 kg	Jasurbek Yuldoshov	Uzbekistan	11 April 2026	Asia-Oceania Open Championships	Bangkok, Thailand	

Women

Category	Record	Athlete	Nationality	Date	Meet	Place	Ref
–41 kg	115 kg	Kerly Lascano	Ecuador	7 November 2025	Youth Parapan American Games	Santiago, Chile	
–45 kg	100 kg	Loveth Abokin	Nigeria	5 February 2020	World Cup	Abuja, Nigeria	
–50 kg	108 kg	Olivia Broome	Great Britain	27 November 2021	World Junior Championships	(Georgia (country)) Tbilisi, Georgia	
–55 kg	127 kg	Onyinyechi Mark	Nigeria	5 February 2020	World Cup	Abuja, Nigeria	
–61 kg	116 kg	Fatma Korany	Egypt	5 February 2020	World Cup	Abuja, Nigeria	
–67 kg	131 kg	Rukhshona Uktamova	Uzbekistan	9 April 2026	Asia-Oceania Open Championships	Bangkok, Thailand	
–73 kg	110 kg	Gulyuz Nematullaeva	Uzbekistan	10 October 2025	Rookie and NextGen World Championships	Cairo, Egypt	
–79 kg	116 kg	Gulyuz Nematullaeva	Uzbekistan	10 April 2026	Asia-Oceania Open Championships	Bangkok, Thailand	
–86 kg	102 kg	Alina Kumeyko	Ukraine	2 December 2017	World Championships	Mexico City, Mexico	
+86 kg	100 kg	Elsa Dewi Saputri	Indonesia	7 December 2023	World Cup	Nakhon Ratchasima, Thailand	

=== Rookie ===
Men

Category	Record	Athlete	Nationality	Date	Meet	Place	Ref
–49 kg	137 kg	Joshua Grist	Great Britain	6 March 2026	European Open Championships	(Georgia (country)) Tbilisi, Georgia	
–54 kg	121 kg	Bahriddin Kholbutaev	Uzbekistan	10 December 2025	Asian Youth Para Games	Dubai, United Arab Emirates	
–59 kg	126 kg	Standard					
–65 kg	135 kg	Fathidin Ahmadi	Tajikistan	11 December 2025	Asian Youth Para Games	Dubai, United Arab Emirates	
–72 kg	167 kg	Muhammad Akmal Danish Mohamad Supi	Malaysia	10 October 2025	Rookie and NextGen World Championships	Cairo, Egypt	
–80 kg	170 kg	Elbek Farkhodov	Uzbekistan	11 December 2025	Asian Youth Para Games	Dubai, United Arab Emirates	
–88 kg	175 kg	Elbek Farkhodov	Uzbekistan	10 April 2026	Asia-Oceania Open Championships	Bangkok, Thailand	
–97 kg	170 kg	Azizbek Perdebaev	Uzbekistan	10 April 2026	Asia-Oceania Open Championships	Bangkok, Thailand	
–107 kg	159 kg	Standard					
+107 kg	175 kg	Amirali Eshaghnia Ani	Iran	12 December 2025	Asian Youth Para Games	Dubai, United Arab Emirates	

Women

Category	Record	Athlete	Nationality	Date	Meet	Place	Ref
–41 kg	74 kg	Snezhanna Boiko	Kazakhstan	9 October 2025	Rookie and NextGen World Championships	Cairo, Egypt	
–45 kg	91 kg	Amalia González	Cuba	7 November 2025	Youth Parapan American Games	Santiago, Chile	
–50 kg	78 kg	Standard					
–55 kg	102 kg	Rukhshona Uktamova	Uzbekistan	5 March 2024	World Cup	Dubai, United Arab Emirates	
–61 kg	114 kg	Rukhshona Uktamova	Uzbekistan	6 September 2024	Paralympic Games	Paris, France	
–67 kg	86 kg	Standard					
–73 kg	86 kg	Standard					
–79 kg	93 kg	Delima Yunia Susanti	Indonesia	10 April 2026	Asia-Oceania Open Championships	Bangkok, Thailand	
–86 kg	98 kg	Standard					
+86 kg	102 kg	Standard					

=== Legend ===
Men

Category	Record	Athlete	Nationality	Date	Meet	Place	Ref
–49 kg	170 kg	Omar Qarada	Jordan	21 May 2026	African Open Championships	Oran, Algeria	
–54 kg	183 kg	Roland Ezuruike	Nigeria	14 October 2025	World Championships	Cairo, Egypt	
–59 kg	184 kg	Juan Garrido	Chile	12 October 2025	World Championships	Cairo, Egypt	
–65 kg	185 kg	Ayrat Zakiev	Russia	7 March 2026	European Open Championships	(Georgia (country)) Tbilisi, Georgia	
–72 kg	194 kg	Shaaban Ibrahim	Egypt	24 August 2023	World Championships	Dubai, United Arab Emirates	
–80 kg	204 kg	Standard					
–88 kg	227 kg	Mohamed Elelfat	Egypt	12 October 2025	World Championships	Cairo, Egypt	
–97 kg	230 kg	Fabio Torres	Colombia	10 July 2022	Parapan American Open Championships	St. Louis, United States	
–107 kg	237 kg	Bobby Body	United States	16 October 2025	World Championships	Cairo, Egypt	
+107 kg	249 kg	Konstantin Matsnev	NPA	17 October 2025	World Championships	Cairo, Egypt	

Women

Category	Record	Athlete	Nationality	Date	Meet	Place	Ref
–41 kg	92 kg	Standard					
–45 kg	108 kg	Nazmiye Muslu Muratlı	Turkey	4 September 2024	Paralympic Games	Paris, France	
–50 kg	112 kg	Nazmiye Muslu Muratlı	Turkey	21 June 2024	World Cup	(Georgia (country)) Tbilisi, Georgia	
–55 kg	120 kg	Tamara Podpalnaya	NPA	12 October 2025	World Championships	Cairo, Egypt	
–61 kg	132 kg	Amalia Pérez	Mexico	8 July 2022	Parapan American Open Championships	St. Louis, United States	
–67 kg	132 kg	Amalia Pérez	Mexico	23 June 2024	World Cup	(Georgia (country)) Tbilisi, Georgia	
–73 kg	132 kg	Lucy Ejike	Nigeria	13 October 2025	World Championships	Cairo, Egypt	
–79 kg	126 kg	Amal Mahmoud Osman	Egypt	23 March 2024	World Cup	Sharm El Sheikh, Egypt	
–86 kg	134 kg	Tharwh Al-Hajaj	Jordan	17 December 2022	World Cup	Dubai, United Arab Emirates	
+86 kg	151 kg	Nadia Ali	Egypt	4 November 2023	World Cup	Cairo, Egypt	

== See also ==
- Para powerlifting classification
- List of Olympic records in weightlifting
- List of world records in Olympic weightlifting
- List of junior world records in Olympic weightlifting
- List of youth world records in Olympic weightlifting
- Progression of the bench press world record
- NFL Scouting Combine Bench press records
- Squat world records
- World record progression women's weightlifting
- World record progression women's weightlifting (1998–2018)
- World record progression men's weightlifting
- World record progression men's weightlifting (1998–2018)
