= Athletics at the 2004 Summer Paralympics – Men's javelin throw F52–58 =

Men's javelin throw events for wheelchair athletes were held at the 2004 Summer Paralympics in the Athens Olympic Stadium. Events were held in eight disability classes.

== F52–53 ==
Men's Javelin F52-53 at the XII Paralympic Games
- Venue: Athens Olympic Stadium
- Dates: 27 September 2004
- Competitors: 15 from 10 nations
- Winning distance: 16.70

Medalists
1st place, gold medalist(s)		Peter Martin	New Zealand
2nd place, silver medalist(s)		Adrián Paz Velázquez	Mexico
3rd place, bronze medalist(s)		Abdolreza Jokar	Iran

The F52–53 event was won by Peter Martin, representing New Zealand.

27 Sept. 2004, 18:30

Rank	Athlete	Result	Points	Notes
1st place, gold medalist(s)	Peter Martin (NZL)	16.70	1045	WR
2nd place, silver medalist(s)	Adrián Paz Velázquez (MEX)	19.78	1033	WR
3rd place, bronze medalist(s)	Abdolreza Jokar (IRI)	19.77	1032	
4	Mauro Maximo de Jesus (MEX)	19.46	1016	
5	Humaid H. Al Mazam (UAE)	16.23	1016	
6	Alphanso Cunningham (JAM)	18.46	964	
7	Rico Glagla (GER)	15.06	943	
8	Gerasimos Vryonis (GRE)	17.67	922	
9	Rodney Farr (AUS)	14.58	912	
10	Georgios Karaminas (GRE)	14.46	905	
11	Val Don Jacobson (USA)	17.32	904	
12	David MacCalman (NZL)	14.01	877	
13	Horacio Bascioni (ARG)	13.53	847	
14	Christos Angourakis (GRE)	15.99	835	
15	Hans-Ulrich Prill (GER)	12.25	767	

== F54 ==
Men's Javelin F54 at the XII Paralympic Games
- Venue: Athens Olympic Stadium
- Dates: 21 September 2004
- Competitors: 7 from 6 nations
- Winning distance: 26.89

Medalists
1st place, gold medalist(s)		Luis A. Zepeda	Mexico
2nd place, silver medalist(s)		Rauno Saunavaara	Finland
3rd place, bronze medalist(s)		Avaz Azmoodeh	Iran

The F54 event was won by Luis A. Zepeda, representing Mexico.

21 Sept. 2004, 09:00

Rank	Athlete	Result	Notes
1st place, gold medalist(s)	Luis A. Zepeda (MEX)	26.89	WR
2nd place, silver medalist(s)	Rauno Saunavaara (FIN)	26.79	
3rd place, bronze medalist(s)	Avaz Azmoodeh (IRI)	26.16	
4	Markku Niinimaki (FIN)	24.76	
5	Bruce Wallrodt (AUS)	24.25	
6	František Pürgl (CZE)	22.42	
7	Rene Schwarz (AUT)	18.93	

== F55–56 ==
Men's Javelin F55-56 at the XII Paralympic Games
- Venue: Athens Olympic Stadium
- Dates: 22 September 2004
- Competitors: 21 from 16 nations
- Winning distance: 35.30

Medalists
1st place, gold medalist(s)		Ali Naderi	Iran
2nd place, silver medalist(s)		Pieter Gruijters	Netherlands
3rd place, bronze medalist(s)		Zhang Ying Bin	China

The F55–56 event was won by Ali Naderi, representing Iran.

22 Sept. 2004, 10:00

Rank	Athlete	Result	Points	Notes
1st place, gold medalist(s)	Ali Naderi (IRI)	35.30	1208	WR
2nd place, silver medalist(s)	Pieter Gruijters (NED)	37.79	1180	WR
3rd place, bronze medalist(s)	Zhang Ying Bin (CHN)	32.65	1117	
4	Rene Nielsen (DEN)	33.99	1061	
5	Josef Stiak (CZE)	31.69	989	
6	Thomas Bradal (DEN)	27.83	952	
7	Hassan Sabokdel Hooshyar (IRI)	27.67	947	
8	Jeffrey Hantz (USA)	30.28	945	
9	Martin Němec (CZE)	27.13	928	
10	Krzysztof Smorszczewski (POL)	28.73	897	
11	Leonardo Diaz Aldana (CUB)	28.65	894	
12	Mashal Al-Otaibi (KUW)	28.12	878	
13	Tanto Campbell (JAM)	27.96	873	
14	Jacques Martin (CAN)	25.41	869	
15	Gerhard Wies (GER)	26.03	812	
16	Renato Misturini (ITA)	22.51	770	
17	Renee Ladera (VEN)	22.77	711	
18	V. Gopalappa (IND)	19.94	682	
19	Bashar Meklef (IRQ)	19.30	660	
	Ulrich Iser (GER)	DNS		
	Mokhtar Nourafshan (IRI)	DNS		

== F57 ==
Men's Javelin F57 at the XII Paralympic Games
- Venue: Athens Olympic Stadium
- Dates: 25 September 2004
- Competitors: 8 from 6 nations
- Winning distance: 40.71

Medalists
1st place, gold medalist(s)		Mohammad R. Mirzaei	Iran
2nd place, silver medalist(s)		Ibrahim Ali	Egypt
3rd place, bronze medalist(s)		Rostislav Pohlmann	Czech Republic

The F57 event was won by Mohammad R. Mirzaei, representing Iran.

25 Sept. 2004, 18:45

Rank	Athlete	Result	Notes
1st place, gold medalist(s)	Mohammad R. Mirzaei (IRI)	40.71	PR
2nd place, silver medalist(s)	Ibrahim Ali (EGY)	39.12	
3rd place, bronze medalist(s)	Rostislav Pohlmann (CZE)	37.91	
4	Julius Hutka (SVK)	37.61	
5	Ji Jianguo (CHN)	36.40	
6	Wang Zhi Quan (CHN)	34.95	
7	Maurizio Nalin (ITA)	29.30	
8	Zheng Weihai (CHN)	27.06	

== F58 ==
Men's Javelin F58 at the XII Paralympic Games
- Venue: Athens Olympic Stadium
- Dates: 26 September 2004
- Competitors: 8 from 6 nations
- Winning distance: 50.72

Medalists
1st place, gold medalist(s)		Silver C. Ezeikpe	Nigeria
2nd place, silver medalist(s)		Mahmoud Elatar	Egypt
3rd place, bronze medalist(s)		Alexis Pizarro	Puerto Rico

The F58 event was won by Silver C. Ezeikpe, representing Nigeria.

26 Sept. 2004, 17:00

Rank	Athlete	Result	Notes
1st place, gold medalist(s)	Silver C. Ezeikpe (NGR)	50.72	WR
2nd place, silver medalist(s)	Mahmoud Elatar (EGY)	49.14	
3rd place, bronze medalist(s)	Alexis Pizarro (PUR)	46.60	
4	El Sayed Moussa (EGY)	45.76	
5	Nasser Al Sahoti (QAT)	44.01	
6	Hussein Elgenedy (EGY)	43.51	
7	Ali Ghribi (TUN)	40.57	
8	Henk Jansen (NED)	34.51	
