= Athletics at the 2004 Summer Paralympics – Men's shot put F52–58 =

Men's shot put events for wheelchair athletes were held at the 2004 Summer Paralympics in the Athens Olympic Stadium. Events were held in six disability classes.

== F52 ==
Men's Shot Put F52 at the XII Paralympic Games
- Venue: Athens Olympic Stadium
- Dates: 22 September 2004
- Competitors: 10 from 6 nations
- Winning distance: 9.34

Medalists
1st place, gold medalist(s)		Peter Martin	New Zealand
2nd place, silver medalist(s)		Georgios Karaminas	Greece
3rd place, bronze medalist(s)		Rico Glagla	Germany

The F52 event was won by Peter Martin, representing New Zealand.

22 Sept. 2004, 18:15

Rank	Athlete	Result	Notes
1st place, gold medalist(s)	Peter Martin (NZL)	9.34	WR
2nd place, silver medalist(s)	Georgios Karaminas (GRE)	8.51	
3rd place, bronze medalist(s)	Rico Glagla (GER)	8.30	
4	Aigars Apinis (LAT)	8.21	
5	Rodney Farr (AUS)	8.19	
6	Zacharias Fostiras (GRE)	7.90	
7	Polychronis Chronopoulos (GRE)	7.30	
8	Hans-Ulrich Prill (GER)	7.01	
9	David MacCalman (NZL)	6.97	
10	Garrett Culliton (IRL)	6.81	

== F53 ==
Men's Shot Put F53 at the XII Paralympic Games
- Venue: Athens Olympic Stadium
- Dates: 23 September 2004
- Competitors: 9 from 7 nations
- Winning distance: 8.53

Medalists
1st place, gold medalist(s)		Mauro Maximo de Jesus	Mexico
2nd place, silver medalist(s)		Husam Azzam	Palestine
3rd place, bronze medalist(s)		Christos Angourakis	Greece

The F53 event was won by Mauro Maximo de Jesus, representing Mexico.

23 Sept. 2004, 18:30

Rank	Athlete	Result	Notes
1st place, gold medalist(s)	Mauro Maximo de Jesus (MEX)	8.53	WR
2nd place, silver medalist(s)	Husam Azzam (PLE)	7.82	
3rd place, bronze medalist(s)	Christos Angourakis (GRE)	7.65	
4	Gerasimos Vryonis (GRE)	7.48	
5	Gabriel Diaz de Leon (USA)	7.03	
6	Ales Kisy (CZE)	6.86	
7	Ali Reza Ya Mousa (IRI)	6.83	
8	Willard Brooks (USA)	6.46	
9	Nir Bahadur Gurung (IND)	6.18	

== F54 ==
Men's Shot Put F54 at the XII Paralympic Games
- Venue: Athens Olympic Stadium
- Dates: 24 September 2004
- Competitors: 10 from 9 nations
- Winning distance: 9.67

Medalists
1st place, gold medalist(s)		Georg Tischler	Austria
2nd place, silver medalist(s)		Rene Schwarz	Austria
3rd place, bronze medalist(s)		Markku Niinimaki	Finland

The F54 event was won by Georg Tischler, representing Austria.

24 Sept. 2004, 18:45

Rank	Athlete	Result	Notes
1st place, gold medalist(s)	Georg Tischler (AUT)	9.67	WR
2nd place, silver medalist(s)	Rene Schwarz (AUT)	8.95	
3rd place, bronze medalist(s)	Markku Niinimaki (FIN)	8.88	
4	Janez Hudej (SLO)	8.77	
5	Bruce Wallrodt (AUS)	8.63	
6	Jesus Mendez (ESP)	8.26	
7	Hubertus Brauner (GER)	8.23	
8	Luis A. Zepeda (MEX)	7.81	
9	Germano Bernardi (ITA)	7.38	
10	Fan Liang (CHN)	7.08	

== F56 ==
Men's Shot Put F56 at the XII Paralympic Games
- Venue: Athens Olympic Stadium
- Dates: 25 September 2004
- Competitors: 18 from 14 nations
- Winning distance: 11.70

Medalists
1st place, gold medalist(s)		Krzysztof Smorszczewski	Poland
2nd place, silver medalist(s)		Gerhard Wies	Germany
3rd place, bronze medalist(s)		Rene Nielsen	Denmark

The F56 event was won by Krzysztof Smorszczewski, representing Poland.

25 Sept. 2004, 18:30

Rank	Athlete	Result	Notes
1st place, gold medalist(s)	Krzysztof Smorszczewski (POL)	11.70	PR
2nd place, silver medalist(s)	Gerhard Wies (GER)	11.29	
3rd place, bronze medalist(s)	Rene Nielsen (DEN)	11.27	
4	Martin Němec (CZE)	11.09	
5	Dimitrios Konstantagkas (GRE)	11.05	
6	Mohamed Beshta (EGY)	10.93	
7	Jalil Bagheri (IRI)	10.35	
8	Stefanos Anargyrou (GRE)	10.34	
9	Alexei Ivanov (RUS)	10.05	
10	Ulrich Iser (GER)	10.03	
11	Pieter Gruijters (NED)	9.78	
12	Willie Beattie (NZL)	9.56	
13	Leonardo Diaz Aldana (CUB)	9.31	
14	Josef Stiak (CZE)	9.15	
15	Renee Ladera (VEN)	8.65	
16	Joseph Christmas (USA)	8.54	
17	Mustafa Yuseinov (BUL)	8.01	
18	Miroslav Šperk (CZE)	7.42	

== F57 ==
Men's Shot Put F57 at the XII Paralympic Games
- Venue: Athens Olympic Stadium
- Dates: 26 September 2004
- Competitors: 11 from 9 nations
- Winning distance: 13.31

Medalists
1st place, gold medalist(s)		Michael Louwrens	South Africa
2nd place, silver medalist(s)		Jamil Elshebli	Jordan
3rd place, bronze medalist(s)		Julius Hutka	Slovakia

The F57 event was won by Michael Louwrens, representing South Africa.

26 Sept. 2004, 18:30

Rank	Athlete	Result	Notes
1st place, gold medalist(s)	Michael Louwrens (RSA)	13.31	PR
2nd place, silver medalist(s)	Jamil Elshebli (JOR)	13.19	
3rd place, bronze medalist(s)	Julius Hutka (SVK)	12.30	
4	Zheng Weihai (CHN)	12.07	
5	Maurizio Nalin (ITA)	11.95	
6	Hossam Abd Ellatif (EGY)	11.59	
7	Larry Hughes (USA)	11.49	
8	Wang Zhi Quan (CHN)	10.42	
9	Alibala Huseynov (AZE)	10.06	
10	Wu Wei (CHN)	8.21	
	Rostislav Pohlmann (CZE)	DNS	

== F58 ==
Men's Shot Put F58 at the XII Paralympic Games
- Venue: Athens Olympic Stadium
- Dates: 27 September 2004
- Competitors: 12 from 9 nations
- Winning distance: 14.19

Medalists
1st place, gold medalist(s)		Ibrahim Allam	Egypt
2nd place, silver medalist(s)		Janusz Rokicki	Poland
3rd place, bronze medalist(s)		Hany Elbehiry	Egypt

The F58 event was won by Ibrahim Allam, representing Egypt.

27 Sept. 2004, 17:45

Rank	Athlete	Result	Notes
1st place, gold medalist(s)	Ibrahim Allam (EGY)	14.19	
2nd place, silver medalist(s)	Janusz Rokicki (POL)	14.19	
3rd place, bronze medalist(s)	Hany Elbehiry (EGY)	14.09	
4	Amer Al Abbadi (JOR)	13.80	
5	Alexis Pizarro (PUR)	13.70	
6	Chen Yong Gang (CHN)	13.47	
7	Adel Alajmi (KUW)	13.23	
8	Metawa Abou Elkhair (EGY)	12.43	
9	Henk Jansen (NED)	11.80	
10	Qiu De Lun (CHN)	10.33	
11	Andre Andrews (SUR)	5.25	
	Silver C. Ezeikpe (NGR)	DSQ	
