= Athletics at the 2004 Summer Paralympics – Men's discus throw F51–58 =

Men's discus throw events for wheelchair athletes were held at the 2004 Summer Paralympics in the Athens Olympic Stadium. Events were held in eight disability classes, F51 being held jointly with F32 cerebral palsy athletes.

== F32/51 ==
Men's Discus F32/51 at the XII Paralympic Games
- Venue: Athens Olympic Stadium
- Dates: 24 September 2004
- Competitors: 8 from 6 nations
- Winning distance: 9.77

Medalists
1st place, gold medalist(s)		Radim Běleš	Czech Republic
2nd place, silver medalist(s)		John McCarthy	Ireland
3rd place, bronze medalist(s)		Dave Gale	Great Britain

The F32/51 event was won by Radim Běleš, representing Czech Republic.

24 Sept. 2004, 18:00

Rank	Athlete	Result	Points	Notes
1st place, gold medalist(s)	Radim Běleš (CZE)	9.77	1082	
2nd place, silver medalist(s)	John McCarthy (IRL)	9.74	1078	
3rd place, bronze medalist(s)	Dave Gale (GBR)	9.41	1042	
4	Richard Schabel (GBR)	9.20	1019	
5	Miroslav Matic (CRO)	8.26	915	
6	Ahmed Kamal (BRN)	16.29	890	PR
7	Ayman Al Heddi (BRN)	15.86	866	
	Karim Betina (ALG)	DNS		

== F52 ==
Men's Discus F52 at the XII Paralympic Games
- Venue: Athens Olympic Stadium
- Dates: 21 September 2004
- Competitors: 6 from 6 nations
- Winning distance: 18.98

Medalists
1st place, gold medalist(s)		Aigars Apinis	Latvia
2nd place, silver medalist(s)		Rico Glagla	Germany
3rd place, bronze medalist(s)		Peter Martin	New Zealand

The F52 event was won by Aigars Apinis, representing Latvia.

21 Sept. 2004, 18:00

Rank	Athlete	Result	Notes
1st place, gold medalist(s)	Aigars Apinis (LAT)	18.98	PR
2nd place, silver medalist(s)	Rico Glagla (GER)	16.85	
3rd place, bronze medalist(s)	Peter Martin (NZL)	15.96	
4	Horacio Bascioni (ARG)	15.96	
5	Garrett Culliton (IRL)	15.86	
6	Rodney Farr (AUS)	15.08	

== F53 ==
Men's Discus F53 at the XII Paralympic Games
- Venue: Athens Olympic Stadium
- Dates: 25 September 2004
- Competitors: 12 from 9 nations
- Winning distance: 25.18

Medalists
1st place, gold medalist(s)		Alphanso Cunningham	Jamaica
2nd place, silver medalist(s)		Toshie Oi	Japan
3rd place, bronze medalist(s)		Mohamed Hassani	Egypt

The F53 event was won by Alphanso Cunningham, representing Jamaica.

25 Sept. 2004, 17:00

Rank	Athlete	Result	Notes
1st place, gold medalist(s)	Alphanso Cunningham (JAM)	25.18	WR
2nd place, silver medalist(s)	Toshie Oi (JPN)	25.03	
3rd place, bronze medalist(s)	Mohamed Hassani (EGY)	23.72	
4	Val Don Jacobson (USA)	21.46	
5	Abdolreza Jokar (IRI)	19.13	
6	Nir Bahadur Gurung (IND)	18.72	
7	Atef Al-Dousari (KUW)	18.22	
8	Mohammadhossein Firoozi (IRI)	17.33	
9	Ales Kisy (CZE)	17.02	
10	Willard Brooks (USA)	16.30	
11	Gabriel Diaz de Leon (USA)	16.11	
12	Mauro Maximo de Jesus (MEX)	14.75	

== F54 ==
Men's Discus F54 at the XII Paralympic Games
- Venue: Athens Olympic Stadium
- Dates: 19 September 2004
- Competitors: 11 from 11 nations
- Winning distance: 28.93

Medalists
1st place, gold medalist(s)		Fan Liang	China
2nd place, silver medalist(s)		Efthymios Kalaras	Greece
3rd place, bronze medalist(s)		František Pürgl	Czech Republic

The F54 event was won by Fan Liang, representing China.

19 Sept. 2004, 19:00

Rank	Athlete	Result	Notes
1st place, gold medalist(s)	Fan Liang (CHN)	28.93	PR
2nd place, silver medalist(s)	Efthymios Kalaras (GRE)	28.07	
3rd place, bronze medalist(s)	František Pürgl (CZE)	27.97	
4	Germano Bernardi (ITA)	25.44	
5	Assadollah Azimi (IRI)	24.15	
6	Janez Hudej (SLO)	23.31	
7	Humaid H. Al Mazam (UAE)	23.10	
8	Georg Tischler (AUT)	22.92	
9	Syamala Raju (IND)	22.87	
10	Luis A. Zepeda (MEX)	20.92	
11	Hubertus Brauner (GER)	19.73	

== F55 ==
Men's Discus F55 at the XII Paralympic Games
- Venue: Athens Olympic Stadium
- Dates: 26 September 2004
- Competitors: 11 from 9 nations
- Winning distance: 37.18

Medalists
1st place, gold medalist(s)		Martin Němec	Czech Republic
2nd place, silver medalist(s)		Jalil Bagheri	Iran
3rd place, bronze medalist(s)		Mokhtar Nourafshan	Iran

The F55 event was won by Martin Němec, representing Czech Republic.

26 Sept. 2004, 17:30

Rank	Athlete	Result	Notes
1st place, gold medalist(s)	Martin Němec (CZE)	37.18	PR
2nd place, silver medalist(s)	Jalil Bagheri (IRI)	34.64	
3rd place, bronze medalist(s)	Mokhtar Nourafshan (IRI)	31.45	
4	Jacques Martin (CAN)	31.10	
5	Symeon Paltsanitidis (GRE)	30.53	
6	Bashar Meklef (IRQ)	30.26	
7	Renato Misturini (ITA)	29.40	
8	Mustafa Yuseinov (BUL)	29.30	
9	Ali Naderi (IRI)	27.62	
10	Ulrich Iser (GER)	25.57	
11	V. Gopalappa (IND)	25.20	

== F56 ==
Men's Discus F56 at the XII Paralympic Games
- Venue: Athens Olympic Stadium
- Dates: 23 September 2004
- Competitors: 11 from 9 nations
- Winning distance: 37.52

Medalists
1st place, gold medalist(s)		Mohammad Sadeghimehryar	Iran
2nd place, silver medalist(s)		Miroslav Šperk	Czech Republic
3rd place, bronze medalist(s)		Tanto Campbell	Jamaica

The F56 event was won by Mohammad Sadeghimehryar, representing Iran.

23 Sept. 2004, 09:30

Rank	Athlete	Result	Notes
1st place, gold medalist(s)	Mohammad Sadeghimehryar (IRI)	37.52	WR
2nd place, silver medalist(s)	Miroslav Šperk (CZE)	37.30	
3rd place, bronze medalist(s)	Tanto Campbell (JAM)	37.04	
4	Mohammad Dabbagh Zadeh (IRI)	34.99	
5	Mahmoud Abd Elsemea (EGY)	34.13	
6	Jeffrey Hantz (USA)	30.67	
7	Gerhard Wies (GER)	29.96	
8	Willie Beattie (NZL)	28.34	
9	Joseph Christmas (USA)	26.99	
10	Renee Ladera (VEN)	24.01	
	Leonardo Diaz Aldana (CUB)		NMR

== F57 ==
Men's Discus F57 at the XII Paralympic Games
- Venue: Athens Olympic Stadium
- Dates: 23 September 2004
- Competitors: 9 from 6 nations
- Winning distance: 47.53

Medalists
1st place, gold medalist(s)		Rostislav Pohlmann	Czech Republic
2nd place, silver medalist(s)		Zheng Weihai	China
3rd place, bronze medalist(s)		Hossam Abd Ellatif	Egypt

The F57 event was won by Rostislav Pohlmann, representing Czech Republic.

23 Sept. 2004, 17:30

Rank	Athlete	Result	Notes
1st place, gold medalist(s)	Rostislav Pohlmann (CZE)	47.53	WR
2nd place, silver medalist(s)	Zheng Weihai (CHN)	46.42	
3rd place, bronze medalist(s)	Hossam Abd Ellatif (EGY)	43.29	
4	Ibrahim Ali (EGY)	43.04	
5	Henk Jansen (NED)	41.20	
6	Ji Jianguo (CHN)	40.68	
7	Larry Hughes (USA)	37.02	
8	Wu Wei (CHN)	32.49	
	Michael Louwrens (RSA)	DNS	

== F58 ==
Men's Discus F58 at the XII Paralympic Games
- Venue: Athens Olympic Stadium
- Dates: 23 September 2004
- Competitors: 10 from 7 nations
- Winning distance: 52.73

Medalists
1st place, gold medalist(s)		Chen Yong Gang	China
2nd place, silver medalist(s)		Mahmoud Elatar	Egypt
3rd place, bronze medalist(s)		Alireza Kamali	Iran

The F58 event was won by Chen Yong Gang, representing China.

23 Sept. 2004, 10:30

Rank	Athlete	Result	Notes
1st place, gold medalist(s)	Chen Yong Gang (CHN)	52.73	
2nd place, silver medalist(s)	Mahmoud Elatar (EGY)	52.59	
3rd place, bronze medalist(s)	Alireza Kamali (IRI)	52.35	
4	Alexis Pizarro (PUR)	51.80	
5	Metawa Abou Elkhair (EGY)	51.06	
6	Tahar Lachheb (TUN)	48.48	
7	Fahad Salem (KUW)	47.96	
8	Ali Ghribi (TUN)	44.48	
9	Qiu De Lun (CHN)	42.63	
10	Janusz Rokicki (POL)	39.55	
