= Czech Republic at the 2004 Summer Paralympics =

- IPC code: CZE
- NPC: Czech Paralympic Committee
- Website: www.paralympic.cz

in Athens
- Competitors: 65 in 8 sports
- Medals Ranked 12th: Gold 16 Silver 8 Bronze 7 Total 31

Summer Paralympics appearances (overview)
- 1996; 2000; 2004; 2008; 2012; 2016; 2020; 2024

Other related appearances
- Czechoslovakia (1972–1992)

Czech Republic competed at the 2004 Summer Paralympics in Athens, Greece. The team included 65 athletes, 45 men and 20 women. Competitors from Czech Republic won 31 medals, including 16 gold, 8 silver and 7 bronze to finish 12th in the medal table. Among them was the flag bearer of the Czech team, Roman Musil – the most successful Czech Paralympian at the Sydney games.

== Medallists ==
Medal	Name	Sport	Event
Gold	Roman Musil	Athletics	Men's shot put F33/34
Gold	Radim Beles	Athletics	Men's discus throw F32/51
Gold	Milan Kubala	Athletics	Men's discus throw F36
Gold	Martin Němec	Athletics	Men's discus throw F55
Gold	Rostislav Pohlmann	Athletics	Men's discus throw F57
Gold	Veronika Foltova	Athletics	Women's shot put F35/36
Gold	Martina Kniezkova	Athletics	Women's discus throw F32-34/51-53
Gold	Veronika Foltova	Athletics	Women's throw F35/36/38
Gold	Marcel Pipek	Cycling	Men's handcycle time trial HC B/C
Gold	Jiří Ježek	Cycling	Men's bicycle road race/time trial LC2
Gold	Martin Kovar	Swimming	Men's 50m freestyle S3
Gold	Martin Kovar	Swimming	Men's 100m freestyle S3
Gold	Martin Kovar	Swimming	Men's 200m freestyle S3
Gold	Katerina Coufalova	Swimming	Women's 100m breaststroke SB9
Gold	Bela Hlaváčková	Swimming	Women's 50m backstroke S5
Gold	Frantisek Glazar; Michal Stefanu; Rene Taus	Table tennis	Men's teams class 5
Silver	Miroslav Sperk	Athletics	Men's discus throw F56
Silver	Radim Beles	Athletics	Men's club throw F32/51
Silver	Vladimira Bujarkova	Athletics	Women's shot put F37/38
Silver	Eva Kacanu	Athletics	Women's shot put F54/55
Silver	Veronika Foltova	Athletics	Women's javelin throw F35-38
Silver	Jiří Ježek	Cycling	Men's bicycle 4 km individual pursuit LC2
Silver	Michal Stefanu	Table tennis	Men's singles class 4
Silver	Jolana Matouskova	Table tennis	Women's singles class 10
Bronze	Dusan Grezl	Athletics	Men's shot put F38
Bronze	Frantisek Purgl	Athletics	Men's discus throw F54
Bronze	Rostislav Pohlmann	Athletics	Men's javelin throw F57
Bronze	Eva Berna	Athletics	Women's shot put F37/38
Bronze	Jiri Bouska	Cycling	Men's bicycle 1 km time trial CP 3/4
Bronze	Jiri Bouska	Cycling	Men's bicycle 3 km individual pursuit CP4
Bronze	Jiri Kaderavek	Swimming	Men's 100m freestyle S1

== Sports ==
=== Archery ===
==== Men ====
Athlete	Event	Ranking round		Round of 32	Round of 16	Quarterfinals	Semifinals	Finals	
Athlete	Event	Score	Seed	Opposition score	Opposition score	Opposition score	Opposition score	Opposition score	Rank
Zdenek Sebek	Men's individual W1	643	3	Bye		Minami (JPN); W 103-94	Groenberg (SWE); L 96-99	Fabry (USA); L 96-108	4

==== Women ====
Athlete	Event	Ranking round		Round of 32	Round of 16	Quarterfinals	Semifinals	Finals	
Athlete	Event	Score	Seed	Opposition score	Opposition score	Opposition score	Opposition score	Opposition score	Rank
Miroslava Cerna	Women's individual W1/W2	552	5	—	Truccolo (ITA); W 119-117	Fantato (ITA); L 80-85	did not advance		
Lenka Kuncova	Women's individual W1/W2	545	9	—	Smith (GBR); L 126-147	did not advance			
Marketa Sidkova	Women's individual W1/W2	550	6	—	Parker (GBR); W 140-121	Isozaki (JPN); L 85-94	did not advance		
Miroslava Cerna; Lenka Kuncova; Marketa Sidkova	Women's teams open	1647	3	—		Italy (ITA); L 176-201	did not advance		

=== Athletics ===
Czech discus thrower Veronika Foltová took the gold, setting a new Paralympic record at 23.47 meters. Martina Kniezková also won a gold medal in the discus throw, setting a new world record in category F51, repeating her triumph at Sydney.

Czech discus thrower František Pürgl initially took fourth place, before being granted the bronze medal after the handicap of the winner Mochtar from Iran was reconsidered and he was moved into other category. Athens was František Pürgl's last Paralympic Games.

==== Men's track ====
Athlete	Class	Event	Heats		Semifinal		Final	
Athlete	Class	Event	Result	Rank	Result	Rank	Result	Rank
Aleš Švehlík	T38	800m	N/A				2:16.53	6

==== Men's field ====
Athlete	Class	Event	Final		
Athlete	Class	Event	Result	Points	Rank
Radim Beles	F32/51	Club throw	25.44	993	2nd place, silver medalist(s)
Radim Beles	F32/51	Discus	9.77	1082	1st place, gold medalist(s)
Dusan Grezl	F36/38	Javelin	41.52	-	6
Dusan Grezl	F38	Discus	35.42	-	7
Dusan Grezl	F38	Shot put	13.19	-	3rd place, bronze medalist(s)
Miroslav Janecek	F38	Shot put	12.11	-	5
Ales Kisy	F53	Discus	17.02	-	9
Ales Kisy	F53	Shot put	6.86	-	6
Roman Kolek	F36/38	Javelin	39.27	-	7
Roman Kolek	F38	Discus	36.28	-	6
Roman Kolek	F38	Shot put	11.72	-	6
Milan Kubala	F36	Discus	35.25	-	1st place, gold medalist(s)
Roman Musil	F33/34	Discus	26.24	870	5
Roman Musil	F33/34	Shot put	10.26	1069 PR	1st place, gold medalist(s)
Martin Němec	F55	Discus	37.18 WR	-	1st place, gold medalist(s)
Martin Němec	F55-56	Javelin	31.69	928	9
Martin Němec	F56	Shot put	11.09	-	4
Rostislav Pohlmann	F57	Discus	47.53 WR	-	1st place, gold medalist(s)
Rostislav Pohlmann	F57	Javelin	37.91	-	3rd place, bronze medalist(s)
Rostislav Pohlmann	F57	Shot put	DNS		
Frantisek Purgl	F54	Discus	27.97	-	3rd place, bronze medalist(s)
Frantisek Purgl	F54	Javelin	22.42	-	6
Miroslav Sperk	F56	Discus	37.30	-	2nd place, silver medalist(s)
Miroslav Sperk	F56	Shot put	7.42	-	18
Josef Stiak	F55-56	Javelin	31.69	989	5
Josef Stiak	F56	Shot put	9.15	-	14
Petr Vratil	F36/38	Javelin	42.49	-	5
Petr Vratil	F38	Discus	38.51	-	4

==== Women's field ====
Athlete	Class	Event	Final		
Athlete	Class	Event	Result	Points	Rank
Eva Berna	F35-38	Javelin	20.63	930	10
Eva Berna	F37	Discus	25.10	703	4
Eva Berna	F37/38	Shot put	9.47	1028	3rd place, bronze medalist(s)
Vladimira Bujarkova	F37	Discus	22.51	706	7
Vladimira Bujarkova	F37/38	Shot put	9.68	1051	2nd place, silver medalist(s)
Andrea Farkasova	F35/36/38	Discus	17.89	700	13
Andrea Farkasova	F35-38	Javelin	22.02	946	9
Andrea Farkasova	F37/38	Shot put	6.99	698	12
Jana Fesslova	F54/55	Discus	19.04	744	12
Jana Fesslova	F54/55	Shot put	6.86	791	11
Veronika Foltova	F35/36	Shot put	9.47 WR	1363	1st place, gold medalist(s)
Veronika Foltova	F35/36/38	Discus	23.47 PR	1323	1st place, gold medalist(s)
Veronika Foltova	F35-38	Javelin	22.70	1288	2nd place, silver medalist(s)
Eva Kacanu	F54/55	Shot put	6.18	1016	2nd place, silver medalist(s)
Martina Kniezkova	F32-34/51-53	Discus	15.28	1330 WR	1st place, gold medalist(s)
Martina Kniezkova	F33/34/52/53	Javelin	9.42	1111	5

=== Boccia ===
Athlete	Event	Preliminaries			Round of 16	Quarterfinals	Semifinals	Final	
Athlete	Event	Opponent	Opposition Score	Rank	Opposition Score	Opposition Score	Opposition Score	Opposition Score	Rank
Ales Bidlas	Mixed individual BC3	Hanson (USA)	L 1-7	5	did not advance				
Ales Bidlas	Mixed individual BC3	Polychronidis (GRE)	W 5-4	5	did not advance				
Ales Bidlas	Mixed individual BC3	Macedo (POR)	L 0-10	5	did not advance				
Ales Bidlas	Mixed individual BC3	Cronin (IRL)	L 0-14	5	did not advance				
Radovan Krenek	Mixed individual BC3	Pesquera (ESP)	L 0-6	3	did not advance				
Radovan Krenek	Mixed individual BC3	Kabush (CAN)	L 0-9	3	did not advance				
Radovan Krenek	Mixed individual BC3	O'Grady (IRL)	W 3-2	3	did not advance				

=== Cycling ===
Cyclist Jiří Bouška was the first to garner a medal for the Czech team. He took the bronze medal in the 1 km race. Jiří made a new world record for division 4, but after conversion of coefficients placed third in the race overall. The British competitor Darren Kenny from division 3 took home the gold medal. Jiří Bouška also took the bronze medal in the 3 km pursuit event, with teammate Luboš Jirka coming in just behind him in fourth place.

Cyclist Jiří Ježek won the silver medal in another pursuit event. He had taken the gold medal in Sydney. Jiří has a below-knee amputation. In the finals in category LC2, he could not beat Robert Alcaide from Spain. Jiří also competed in the combination event, and won the gold medal there.

Historically, the first gold medal in timed competition went to the Czech handy-cyclist, Marcel Pipek. He expressed that he had trained very hard to prepare for the race with his friend in Jeseníky.

==== Men's road ====
Athlete	Event	Time	Rank
Jiri Bouska	Men's road race / time trial CP div 4	-	5
Jiří Ježek	Men's road race / time trial LC2	-	1st place, gold medalist(s)
Lubos Jirka	Men's road race / time trial CP div 4	-	8
Marcel Pipek	Men's handcycle road race HC div B/C	1:25:40	6
Marcel Pipek	Men's handcycle time trial HC div B/C	17:28.09	1st place, gold medalist(s)
Petr Plihal	Men's road race / time trial CP div 4	-	11
Michal Stark	Men's road race / time trial LC3	-	6
Josef Winkler	Men's tricycle road race CP div 1/2	49:21	4
Josef Winkler	Men's tricycle time trial CP div 1/2	10:53.13	7

==== Women's road ====
Athlete	Event	Time	Rank
Daniela Prochazkova	Women's time trial LC1-4/CP 3/4	36:06.94	11

==== Men's track ====
Athlete	Event	Qualification		1st round		Final	
Athlete	Event	Time	Rank	Time	Rank	Opposition Time	Rank
Jiri Bouska	Men's 1km time trial CP div 3/4	—				1:11.35	3rd place, bronze medalist(s)
Jiri Bouska	Men's individual pursuit CP div 4	3:47.32	3 Q	Herholdt (RSA); W 3:43.61	3 q	Jirka (CZE); W 3:46.62	3rd place, bronze medalist(s)
Jiří Ježek	Men's 1km time trial LC1-4	—				1:11.35	9
Jiří Ježek	Men's individual pursuit LC2	5:06.85	2 Q	Granado (ESP); W 5:01.43	2 Q	Alcaide (ESP); L 5:01.23	2nd place, silver medalist(s)
Lubos Jirka	Men's 1km time trial CP div 3/4	—				1:15.62	7
Lubos Jirka	Men's individual pursuit CP div 4	3:53.71	4 Q	Lungershausen (GER); W 3:53.36	4 q	Bouska (CZE); L 3:52.22	4
Petr Plihal	Men's 1km time trial CP div 3/4	—				1:20.38	15
Petr Plihal	Men's individual pursuit CP div 4	4:16.37	11	did not advance			
Michal Stark	Men's 1km time trial LC1-4	—				1:12.94	14
Michal Stark	Men's individual pursuit LC3	4:16.27	7 Q	Graf (GER); L 4:13.99	6	did not advance	
Jiri Bouska; Jiří Ježek; Michal Stark	Men's team sprint LC1-4/CP 3/4	57.659	5	Germany (GER); L 57.285	5	did not advance	

==== Women's track ====
Athlete	Event	Qualification		Final	
Athlete	Event	Time	Rank	Opposition Time	Rank
Daniela Prochazkova	Women's time trial LC1-4/CP 3/4	N/A		1:33.13	12

=== Swimming ===
Czech swimmers had a successful showing at the games as well. Swimmer Martin Kovář won the 100 meter freestyle competition, taking home the gold medal and setting a new world record. He bested his previous world record that had held for 3 months old, by over 2 seconds. He has now confirmed his absolute sovereignty in the S3 category. Martin also took home the gold in the 200 meter free style event, again setting a world record, despite having to swim the competition from the lane 8.

In category S1, Jiří Kadeřávek won the bronze medal in the 100 meter crawl. He also participated in the rugby union event at the games.

Less than six months after giving birth, Běla Hlaváčková returned to compete in the swimming events and won a gold medal for the 50 meter backstroke Her biggest competitor, Beatrice Hess from France, finished just after her. Kateřina Lišková also participated in this event, placing fourth.

Swimmer Kateřina Coufalová won the next gold medal for the Czech team in the 100 meter breaststroke competition in category SB9. This category is for competitors with an amputated arm. After her triumph in Atlanta, this marked the second gold medal in her career.

==== Men ====
Athlete	Class	Event	Heats		Final	
Athlete	Class	Event	Result	Rank	Result	Rank
Petr Andrysek	S6	400m freestyle	6:19.19	13	did not advance	
Filip Coufal	S10	50m freestyle	26.94	11	did not advance	
Filip Coufal	S10	100m freestyle	58.13	9	did not advance	
Filip Coufal	S10	400m freestyle	4:42.97	11	did not advance	
Filip Coufal	S10	100m backstroke	1:11.28	12	did not advance	
Filip Coufal	S10	100m butterfly	1:07.28	13	did not advance	
Filip Coufal	SM10	200m individual medley	2:28.24	8 Q	2:31.46	8
Vojtech Franek	S2	50m freestyle	1:17.51	7 Q	1:19.79	8
Vojtech Franek	S2	100m freestyle	2:52.46	8 Q	2:50.16	8
Vojtech Franek	S2	200m freestyle	6:22.01	10	did not advance	
Vojtech Franek	S2	50m backstroke	1:17.67	6 Q	1:17.31	6
Jiri Kaderavek	S1	50m freestyle	N/A		1:54.32	4
Jiri Kaderavek	S1	100m freestyle	N/A		3:40.46	3rd place, bronze medalist(s)
Jiri Kaderavek	S1	50m backstroke	N/A		1:48.23	4
Martin Kovar	S3	50m freestyle	47.04 PR	1 Q	45.65 WR	1st place, gold medalist(s)
Martin Kovar	S3	100m freestyle	1:57.09	3 Q	1:43.51 PR	1st place, gold medalist(s)
Martin Kovar	S3	200m freestyle	4:30.18	7 Q	3:42.63 WR	1st place, gold medalist(s)
Martin Kovar	S3	50m backstroke	57.00	3 Q	58.73	4
Dalibor Mach	S7	50m freestyle	32.95	14	did not advance	
Dalibor Mach	S7	100m freestyle	1:11.73	9	did not advance	
Dalibor Mach	S7	400m freestyle	5:38.41	10	did not advance	
Dalibor Mach	S7	50m butterfly	37.91	12	did not advance	
Dalibor Mach	SB6	100m breaststroke	N/A		1:44.11	8
Dalibor Mach	SM7	200m individual medley	3:15.18	13	did not advance	
Pavel Machala	S9	50m freestyle	28.47	17	did not advance	
Pavel Machala	S9	100m freestyle	1:02.29	16	did not advance	
Jan Povysil	S4	50m freestyle	41.61	4 Q	42.33	6
Jan Povysil	S4	100m freestyle	1:31.72	5 Q	1:38.38	7
Jan Povysil	S4	200m freestyle	3:24.27	6 Q	3:22.85	5
Jan Povysil	S4	50m backstroke	53.40	4 Q	54.82	8
Jan Povysil	S4	50m butterfly	1:07.18	8 Q	1:07.65	7
Jan Povysil	SB3	50m breaststroke	58.74	8 Q	59.16	8
Jan Povysil	SM4	150m individual medley	3:04.57	10	did not advance	
Tomas Scharf	S7	50m freestyle	32.67	13	did not advance	
Tomas Scharf	S7	50m butterfly	39.68	14	did not advance	
Martin Štěpánek	S13	50m freestyle	27.36	9	did not advance	
Martin Štěpánek	S13	100m freestyle	1:00.66	9	did not advance	
Martin Štěpánek	S13	100m backstroke	1:13.67	8 Q	1:12.66	8
Martin Štěpánek	SB13	100m breaststroke	1:18.19	6 Q	DSQ	
Martin Štěpánek	SM13	200m individual medley	2:36.81	7 Q	2:35.22	7
Lukas Urbanek	S10	100m freestyle	58.64	12	did not advance	
Lukas Urbanek	S10	400m freestyle	4:32.68	7 Q	4:29.82	6
Petr Andrysek; Martin Kovar; Jan Povysil; Tomas Scharf	N/A	4 × 50 m freestyle relay (20pts)	2:45.23	5 Q	2:41.37	5
Filip Coufal; Dalibor Mach; Tomas Scharf; Lukas Urbanek	N/A	4 × 100 m freestyle relay (34pts)	4:21.77	8 Q	4:22.35	8
Martin Kovar; Dalibor Mach; Jan Povysil; Tomas Scharf	N/A	4 × 50 m medley relay (20pts)	3:08.36	8 Q	3:12.82	8

==== Women ====
Athlete	Class	Event	Heats		Final	
Athlete	Class	Event	Result	Rank	Result	Rank
Katerina Coufalova	SB9	100m breaststroke	1:23.19	1 Q	1:24.17	1st place, gold medalist(s)
Tereza Diepoldova	S9	400m freestyle	5:26.49	11	did not advance	
Tereza Diepoldova	S9	100m backstroke	1:23.94	13	did not advance	
Tereza Diepoldova	SM9	200m individual medley	3:04.77	14	did not advance	
Bela Hlaváčková	S5	50m freestyle	38.46	3 Q	38.42	4
Bela Hlaváčková	S5	100m freestyle	1:25.80	5 Q	1:25.36	5
Bela Hlaváčková	S5	50m backstroke	41.78	1 Q	42.36	1st place, gold medalist(s)
Bela Hlaváčková	S5	50m butterfly	N/A		50.84	5
Bela Hlaváčková	SB4	100m breaststroke	2:04.58	6 Q	2:06.17	6
Petra Hrabinova	S7	400m freestyle	6:50.02	12	did not advance	
Petra Hrabinova	SB6	100m breaststroke	1:56.34	5 Q	1:55.10	6
Katerina Liskova	S5	50m freestyle	43.56	6 Q	43.83	6
Katerina Liskova	S5	100m freestyle	1:32.77	6 Q	1:30.18	6
Katerina Liskova	S5	200m freestyle	3:15.54	4 Q	3:18.55	4
Katerina Liskova	S5	50m backstroke	49.97	4 Q	51.11	4

=== Table tennis ===
==== Men ====
Athlete	Event	Preliminaries				Round of 16	Quarterfinals	Semifinals	Final / BM	
Athlete	Event	Opposition Result	Opposition Result	Opposition Result	Rank	Opposition Result	Opposition Result	Opposition Result	Opposition Result	Rank
Jaroslav Cieslar	Men's singles 9	Last (NED); W 3-2	Alimardani (IRI); W 3-0	Gubica (CRO); W 3-0	1 Q	Lu X (CHN); L 1-3	did not advance			
Miroslav Cinibulk	Men's singles 9	Hsu C S (TPE); L 2-3	Serignat (FRA); L 0-3	Gutdeutsch (AUT); L 2-3	4	did not advance				
Milan Duracka	Men's singles 7	Furlan (ITA); L 0-3	Morales (ESP); L 0-3	Lima (BRA); W 3-1	3	did not advance				
Frantisek Glazar	Men's singles 3	Kesler (SCG); L 2-3	Kramminger (AUT); L 2-3	Siachos (GRE); W 3–0	3	did not advance				
Ivan Karavec	Men's singles 10	Altaratz (ISR); W 3-1	Agudo (ESP); DSQ	—	3	did not advance				
Jiri Soukup	Men's singles 8	Ledoux (BEL); L 0-3	Lo (USA); W 3-0	J du Plooy (RSA); W 3-1	2 Q	—	Frommelt (LIE); L 2-3	did not advance		
Michal Stefanu	Men's singles 4	Zhang Y (CHN); L 0-3	A Chan (GBR); W 3-0	Freitas (BRA); W 3-0	2 Q	Pechard (FRA); W 3-1	Ghion (BEL); W 3-1	Choi K S (KOR); W 3-0	Zhang Y (CHN); L 2-3	2nd place, silver medalist(s)
Rene Taus	Men's singles 5	Urhaug (NOR); L 0-3	Rosec (FRA); L 1-3	—	3	did not advance				
Tomas Vrbka	Men's singles 10	de la Bourdonnaye (FRA); L 0-3	Vivanco (MEX); W 3-0	Khalil (JOR); W 3-0	2 Q	—	Gaspar (SVK); L 0-3	did not advance		
Frantisek Glazar; Michal Stefanu; Rene Taus	Men's teams 5	Germany (GER); W 3-0	Japan (JPN); W 3-1	—	1 Q	—	Sweden (SWE); W 3-1	France (FRA); W 3-2	South Korea (KOR); W 3-2	1st place, gold medalist(s)
Milan Duracka; Jiri Soukup	Men's team 8	Belgium (BEL); L 0-3	China (CHN); L 1-3	Spain (ESP); L 0-3	4	did not advance				
Jaroslav Cieslar; Miroslav Cinibulk; Ivan Karabec; Tomas Vrbka	Men's team 10	Sweden (SWE); W 3-1	Italy (ITA); W 3-1	Hungary (HUN); W 3-0	1 Q	—		France (FRA); L 1-3	Sweden (SWE); L 1-3	4

Ivan Karabec was disqualified due to excessive use of prohibited solvents on his rackets: he was out of the competition.

==== Women ====
Athlete	Event	Preliminaries				Quarterfinals	Semifinals	Final / BM	
Athlete	Event	Opposition Result	Opposition Result	Opposition Result	Rank	Opposition Result	Opposition Result	Opposition Result	Rank
Jaroslava Janeckova	Women's singles 6-8	Turowska (POL); L 1-3	Tchebanika (RUS); W 3-2	—	2 Q	Ovsjannikova (RUS); L 1-3	did not advance		
Jolana Matouskova	Women's singles 10	Li Y Q (CHN); W 3-1	Jagodzinska (POL); W 3-0	Sevin (FRA); W/O	1 Q	—	Kudo (JPN); W 3-2	Partyka (POL); L 0-3	2nd place, silver medalist(s)
Jitka Pivarciova	Women's singles 5	Hoffmann (MEX); W 3–0	Bessho (JPN); W 3–1	Gu G (CHN); W 3-1	1 Q	Palasse (FRA); W 3-1	Ren G X (CHN); L 1-3	Wei M H (TPE); L 2-3	4
Michala Zakova	Women's singles 10	Partyka (POL); L 0-3	Kudo (JPN); L 0-3	le Morvan (FRA); W 3-2	3	did not advance			

=== Wheelchair tennis ===
==== Men ====
Athlete	Class	Event	Round of 64	Round of 32	Round of 16	Quarterfinals	Semifinals	Finals
Athlete	Class	Event	Opposition Result	Opposition Result	Opposition Result	Opposition Result	Opposition Result	Opposition Result
Miroslav Brychta	Open	Men's singles	Hubbard (RSA); W 6–0, 6–0	Olsson (SWE); W 7–5, 6–2	Jeremiasz (FRA); L 3–6, 2–6	did not advance		

== See also ==
- Czech Republic at the Paralympics
- Czech Republic at the 2004 Summer Olympics
