= Jamaica at the 2012 Summer Paralympics =

- IPC code: JAM
- NPC: Jamaica Paralympic Association

in London
- Competitors: 3 in 1 sport
- Medals Ranked 52nd: Gold 1 Silver 0 Bronze 0 Total 1

Summer Paralympics appearances (overview)
- 1968; 1972; 1976; 1980; 1984; 1988; 1992; 1996; 2000; 2004; 2008; 2012; 2016; 2020; 2024

Jamaica competed at the 2012 Summer Paralympics in London, United Kingdom from August 29 to September 9, 2012.

== Medallists ==
Medal	Name	Sport	Event	Date
Gold	Alphanso Cunningham	Athletics	Men's Javelin Throw F52-53	4 September

== Athletics ==
Between 1992 and 2012, Jamaica had problems performing on the track. In this period, they won only two gold medals. One was won in 2012 by Alphonso Cunningham in the men's javelin throw F52/53 event.

Men's Field Events

Athlete	Event	Distance	Points	Rank
Tanto Campbell	Discus Throw F54-56	41.66	972	5
Alphanso Cunningham	Discus Throw F51-53	24.68	835	4
Alphanso Cunningham	Javelin Throw F52-53	21.84	985	1st place, gold medalist(s)

Women's Field Events

Athlete	Event	Distance	Points	Rank
Sylvia Grant	Javelin Throw F57-58	19.06	780	8

== Media ==
There was no domestic broadcast rights holder for the Paralympic Games for 2012 and 2016 Games.

== See also ==
- Jamaica at the 2012 Summer Olympics
