= Jamaica at the 2008 Summer Paralympics =

- IPC code: JAM
- NPC: Jamaica Paralympic Association

in Beijing
- Competitors: 4 in 1 sport
- Flag bearer: Tanto Campbell
- Medals Ranked 69th: Gold 0 Silver 0 Bronze 1 Total 1

Summer Paralympics appearances (overview)
- 1968; 1972; 1976; 1980; 1984; 1988; 1992; 1996; 2000; 2004; 2008; 2012; 2016; 2020; 2024

Jamaica sent a delegation to compete at the 2008 Summer Paralympics in Beijing, People's Republic of China. The team consisted of four competitors, all in track and field athletics.

== Medallists ==
The country won one medal, a bronze.

Medal	Name	Sport	Event
Bronze	Tanto Campbell	Athletics	Men's Discus Throw - F55/56

== Athletics ==
Athlete	Event	Final		
Athlete	Event	Result	Points	Rank
Tanto Campbell	Men's discus F55/56	39.31	1021	Bronze medal
Alphanso Cunningham	Men's discus F53/54	25.90	1020	4
Alphanso Cunningham	Men's javelin F53/54	13.86	695	11
Sylvia Grant	Women's discus F57/58	19.69	747	12
Sylvia Grant	Women's javelin F57/58	16.05	806	9
Vinnette Green	Women's discus F54-56	13.07	775	10

== See also ==
- Jamaica at the Paralympics
- Jamaica at the 2008 Summer Olympics
