= Swimming at the 2000 Summer Paralympics – Women's 50 metre breaststroke SB14 =

Women's 50m breaststroke SB14 at the XI Paralympic Games
- Paralympic Swimming
- Venue: Sydney International Aquatic Centre
- Dates: 20 October 2000

Medalists
1st place, gold medalist(s)		Ivana Kumpoštová	Czech Republic
2nd place, silver medalist(s)		Yolanda Jurado	Spain
3rd place, bronze medalist(s)		Alicia Aberley	Australia

The women's 50m breaststroke SB14 event took place on 20 October 2000 in Sydney, Australia.

== Results ==
=== Heat 1 ===
Rank	Athlete	Time	Notes
1	Yolanda Jurado (ESP)	37.18	Q, PR
2	Emma Mounkley (GBR)	39.33	Q
3	Janne Mugame (EST)	40.04	Q
4	Zsofia Berczi (HUN)	41.65	Q
5	Naomi Sprick (NED)	42.78	

=== Heat 2 ===
Rank	Athlete	Time	Notes
1	Ivana Kumpoštová (CZE)	37.75	Q
2	Alicia Aberley (AUS)	38.62	Q
3	Siobhan Paton (AUS)	39.16	Q
4	Nathalie Groenevelt (NED)	41.56	Q
5	Petrea Barker (AUS)	42.49	

=== Final ===
Rank	Athlete	Time	Notes
1st place, gold medalist(s)	Ivana Kumpoštová (CZE)	37.11	PR
2nd place, silver medalist(s)	Yolanda Jurado (ESP)	37.15	
3rd place, bronze medalist(s)	Alicia Aberley (AUS)	38.17	
4	Siobhan Paton (AUS)	38.51	
5	Emma Mounkley (GBR)	39.13	
6	Janne Mugame (EST)	40.14	
7	Zsofia Berczi (HUN)	40.99	
8	Nathalie Groenevelt (RSA)	42.01	
