= Czech Republic at the 2000 Summer Paralympics =

- IPC code: CZE
- NPC: Czech Paralympic Committee
- Website: www.paralympic.cz

in Sydney
- Competitors: 57 (41 male, 16 women)
- Medals Ranked 11th: Gold 15 Silver 15 Bronze 13 Total 43

Summer Paralympics appearances (overview)
- 1996; 2000; 2004; 2008; 2012; 2016; 2020; 2024

Other related appearances
- Czechoslovakia (1972–1992)

There were 16 female and 41 male athletes representing the country at the 2000 Summer Paralympics.

== Medal table ==
Medal	Name	Sport	Event
Gold	Zdenek Sebek	Archery	Men's individual W1
Gold	Milan Kubala	Athletics	Men's discus F36
Gold	Martin Němec	Athletics	Men's discus F55
Gold	Roman Musil	Athletics	Men's javelin F33
Gold	Roman Musil	Athletics	Men's shot put F33
Gold	Martina Kniezkova	Athletics	Women's discus F51–54
Gold	Roman Musil	Cycling	Mixed tricycle 1.9 km time trial CP div 2
Gold	Jiří Ježek	Cycling	Mixed 1 km time trial LC2
Gold	Jiří Ježek	Cycling	Mixed individual pursuit LC2
Gold	Martin Kovář	Swimming	Men's 50m backstroke S3
Gold	Ivana Kumpoštová	Swimming	Women's 50m breaststroke SB14
Gold	Jana Hoffmanová	Swimming	Women's 50m freestyle S3
Gold	Michal Stefanu	Table tennis	Men's singles 4
Gold	Ivan Karabec	Table tennis	Men's singles 10
Gold	Jolana Davidkova	Table tennis	Women's singles 10
Silver	Petr Novak	Athletics	Men's 100m T11
Silver	Roman Musil	Athletics	Men's discus F33
Silver	Roman Kolek	Athletics	Men's discus F38
Silver	Frantisek Purgl	Athletics	Men's discus F54
Silver	Josef Stiak	Athletics	Men's javelin F56
Silver	Rostislav Pohlmann	Athletics	Men's javelin F57
Silver	Martin Němec	Athletics	Men's shot put F55
Silver	Vladimira Bujarkova	Athletics	Women's discus F37
Silver	Martina Kniezkova	Athletics	Women's javelin F52–54
Silver	Jiří Ježek	Cycling	Mixed bicycle road race LC2
Silver	Kateřina Lišková	Swimming	Women's 50m backstroke S5
Silver	Ivana Kumpoštová	Swimming	Women's 50m backstroke S14
Silver	Tomas Pribyl; Martin Zvolanek	Table tennis	Men's teams 1-2
Silver	Lubomir Masek; Miroslav Cinibulk; Pavel Cech	Table tennis	Men's team 10
Silver	Jolana Davidkova; Jana Mojova; Eva Pestova; Michala Zakova	Table tennis	Women's teams 6-10
Bronze	Ales Svehlik	Athletics	Men's 5000m T38
Bronze	Roman Musil	Cycling	Mixed tricycle 5.4 km time trial CP div 2
Bronze	Michal Stark	Cycling	Mixed individual pursuit LC3
Bronze	Pavel Machala	Swimming	Men's 50m freestyle S9
Bronze	Martin Kovář	Swimming	Men's 100m freestyle S3
Bronze	Jan Povysil	Swimming	Men's 100m freestyle S4
Bronze	Jana Hoffmanová	Swimming	Women's 50m backstroke S3
Bronze	Vera Stillnerova	Swimming	Women's 50m butterfly S14
Bronze	Jana Hoffmanová	Swimming	Women's 100m freestyle S3
Bronze	Katerina Coufalová	Swimming	Women's 200m individual medley SM9
Bronze	Martin Zvolanek	Swimming	Men's singles 2
Bronze	Frantisek Glazar; Michal Stefanu; Lubomir Trcka	Table tennis	Men's team 4
Bronze	Jitka Pivarciova	Table tennis	Women's singles 5

== See also ==
- Czech Republic at the 2000 Summer Olympics
- Czech Republic at the Paralympics

== Bibliography ==
- International Paralympic Committee (2000). "Appendix C: Athlete Numbers – By Delegation". Sydney 2000 Paralympic Games Post Games Report. Sydney.
