= Jamaica at the Paralympics =

- IPC code: JAM
- NPC: Jamaica Paralympic Association
- Medals Ranked 52nd: Gold 21 Silver 16 Bronze 18 Total 55

Summer appearances
- 1968; 1972; 1976; 1980; 1984; 1988; 1992; 1996; 2000; 2004; 2008; 2012; 2016; 2020; 2024

Jamaica made its Paralympic Games début at the 1968 Summer Paralympics in Tel Aviv. It competed again in 1972, was absent in 1976, returned in 1980, and has competed at every edition of the Summer Paralympics since then. Jamaica has never taken part in the Winter Paralympics.

Jamaican competitors have won a total of 55 Paralympic medals: 21 gold, 16 silver and 18 bronze. This puts it in 52ndz place on the all-time Paralympic Games medal table.

Jamaica's success has declined sharply over the years, from a peak of 8 gold medals, 3 silver and 7 bronze in 1972, to just 1 bronze in 2008. Jamaica's gold medallists are Baracatt (full name not recorded; women's precision javelin, 1968); Excell (full name not recorded; men's club throw, 1968); Meikle (full name not recorded; women's 50m breaststroke, 1968); Patrick Reid (men's discus and pentathlon, men's 25m breaststroke, 1972); Rohne (full name not recorded; women's 60m wheelchair race, 1972); Leone Williams (women's discus, 1972; women's discus and shot put, 1980); Nella McPherson (women's 3x25m medley and 50m breaststroke, 1972); Pearson (full name not recorded; men's featherweight (weightlifting), 1972); Henriette Davis (women's shot put, 1980); Davis Jeffreson (men's javelin, 1980); Sarah Newland (women's 100m race, women's 100m breaststroke, 1980); Minette Wilson (women's club throw, 1980; women's javelin, 1988); and Alphanso Cunningham (men's discus, 2004).

== Medal tally ==
| Event | Gold | Silver | Bronze | Total | Ranking |
| 1968 Summer Paralympics | 3 | 1 | 1 | 5 | 14th |
| 1972 Summer Paralympics | 8 | 3 | 4 | 15 | 10th |
| 1976 Summer Paralympics | did not compete | | | | |
| 1980 Summer Paralympics | 7 | 7 | 5 | 19 | 18th |
| 1984 Summer Paralympics | 0 | 0 | 0 | 0 | - |
| 1988 Summer Paralympics | 1 | 4 | 3 | 8 | 33rd |
| 1992 Summer Paralympics | 0 | 1 | 2 | 3 | 47th |
| 1996 Summer Paralympics | 0 | 0 | 0 | 0 | - |
| 2000 Summer Paralympics | 0 | 0 | 0 | 0 | - |
| 2004 Summer Paralympics | 1 | 0 | 1 | 2 | 53rd |
| 2008 Summer Paralympics | 0 | 0 | 1 | 1 | 69th |
| 2012 Summer Paralympics | 1 | 0 | 0 | 1 | 52nd |
| 2016 Summer Paralympics | 0 | 0 | 0 | 0 | - |
| 2020 Summer Paralympics | 0 | 0 | 0 | 0 | - |
| 2024 Summer Paralympics | 0 | 0 | 0 | 0 | - |
| Total | 21 | 16 | 18 | 55 | 51 |

== Medalists ==
| Medal | Name | Games | Sport | Event |
|---|---|---|---|---|
| Gold | Vincent Excell | (Israel) 1968 Tel Aviv | Athletics | Men's precision javelin throw open |
| Gold | Baracatt | (Israel) 1968 Tel Aviv | Athletics | Women's precision javelin throw open |
| Gold | Constance Meikle | (Israel) 1968 Tel Aviv | Swimming | Women's 50m breaststroke class 4 incomplete |
| Silver | Constance Meikle | (Israel) 1968 Tel Aviv | Swimming | Women's 50m freestyle class 4 incomplete |
| Bronze | Hall | (Israel) 1968 Tel Aviv | Weightlifting | Men's lightweight |
| Gold | Patrick Reid | (West Germany) 1972 Heidelberg | Athletics | Men's discus throw 1B |
| Gold | Patrick Reid | (West Germany) 1972 Heidelberg | Athletics | Men's pentathlon 1B |
| Gold | Eloise Rhone | (West Germany) 1972 Heidelberg | Athletics | Women's 60m wheelchair 5 |
| Gold | Leone Williams | (West Germany) 1972 Heidelberg | Athletics | Women's discus throw 5 |
| Gold | Patrick Reid | (West Germany) 1972 Heidelberg | Swimming | Men's 25m breaststroke 1B |
| Gold | Nella McPherson | (West Germany) 1972 Heidelberg | Swimming | Women's 50m breaststroke 3 |
| Gold | Nella McPherson | (West Germany) 1972 Heidelberg | Swimming | Women's 75m individual medley 3 |
| Gold | Desmond Pearson | (West Germany) 1972 Heidelberg | Weightlifting | Men's featherweight |
| Silver | Leone Williams | (West Germany) 1972 Heidelberg | Swimming | Women's 100m backstroke 6 |
| Silver | Delores Mullings | (West Germany) 1972 Heidelberg | Swimming | Women's 25m breaststroke 2 |
| Bronze | Lewis; Nella McPherson; Rhone; Leone Williams | (West Germany) 1972 Heidelberg | Athletics | Women's 4x40m wheelchair relay open |
| Bronze | Patrick Reid | (West Germany) 1972 Heidelberg | Swimming | Men's 25m backstroke 1B |
| Bronze | Nella McPherson | (West Germany) 1972 Heidelberg | Swimming | Women's 50m backstroke 3 |
| Bronze | Delores Mullings | (West Germany) 1972 Heidelberg | Swimming | Women's 75m individual medley 2 |
| Gold | Jefferson Davis | (Netherlands) 1980 Arnhem | Athletics | Men's javelin throw 3 |
| Gold | Sarah Newland | (Netherlands) 1980 Arnhem | Athletics | Women's 100m D1 |
| Gold | Minette Wilson | (Netherlands) 1980 Arnhem | Athletics | Women's club throw 1B |
| Gold | Leone Williams | (Netherlands) 1980 Arnhem | Athletics | Women's discus throw 5 |
| Gold | Henriette Davis | (Netherlands) 1980 Arnhem | Athletics | Women's shot put 4 |
| Gold | Leone Williams | (Netherlands) 1980 Arnhem | Athletics | Women's shot put 5 |
| Gold | Sarah Newland | (Netherlands) 1980 Arnhem | Swimming | Women's 100m breaststroke D1 |
| Silver | Quida White | (Netherlands) 1980 Arnhem | Athletics | Women's discus throw 3 |
| Silver | Henriette Davis | (Netherlands) 1980 Arnhem | Athletics | Women's javelin throw 4 |
| Silver | Leone Williams | (Netherlands) 1980 Arnhem | Athletics | Women's javelin throw 5 |
| Silver | Nella McPherson | (Netherlands) 1980 Arnhem | Athletics | Women's slalom 3 |
| Silver | Nella McPherson | (Netherlands) 1980 Arnhem | Swimming | Women's 50m backstroke 3 |
| Silver | Nella McPherson | (Netherlands) 1980 Arnhem | Swimming | Women's 50m breaststroke 3 |
| Silver | Sarah Newland | (Netherlands) 1980 Arnhem | Swimming | Women's 3x50m individual medley D1 |
| Bronze | Norman Burke | (Netherlands) 1980 Arnhem | Athletics | Men's javelin throw D1 |
| Bronze | Norman Burke | (Netherlands) 1980 Arnhem | Athletics | Men's shot put D1 |
| Bronze | Patrick Reid | (Netherlands) 1980 Arnhem | Athletics | Men's pentathlon 1C |
| Bronze | Minette Wilson | (Netherlands) 1980 Arnhem | Athletics | Women's shot put 1B |
| Gold | Minette Wilson | (South Korea) 1988 Seoul | Athletics | Women's javelin throw 1B |
| Silver | Jefferson Davis | (South Korea) 1988 Seoul | Athletics | Men's javelin throw 4 |
| Silver | Sylvia Grant | (South Korea) 1988 Seoul | Athletics | Women's discus throw 5 |
| Silver | Sylvia Grant | (South Korea) 1988 Seoul | Athletics | Women's javelin throw 5 |
| Silver | Sylvia Grant | (South Korea) 1988 Seoul | Athletics | Women's pentathlon 5-6 |
| Bronze | Minette Wilson | (South Korea) 1988 Seoul | Athletics | Women's discus throw 1B |
| Bronze | Henriette Davis | (South Korea) 1988 Seoul | Athletics | Women's javelin throw 4 |
| Bronze | Minette Wilson | (South Korea) 1988 Seoul | Athletics | Women's shot put 1B |
| Silver | Sylvia Grant | (Spain) 1992 Barcelona | Athletics | Women's javelin throw THW7 |
| Bronze | Jefferson Davis | (Spain) 1992 Barcelona | Athletics | Men's javelin throw THW6 |
| Bronze | Sylvia Grant | (Spain) 1992 Barcelona | Athletics | Women's discus throw THW7 |
| Gold | Alphanso Cunningham | (Greece) 2004 Athens | Athletics | Men's discus throw F53 |
| Bronze | Tanto Campbell | (Greece) 2004 Athens | Athletics | Men's discus throw F56 |
| Bronze | Tanto Campbell | (China) 2008 Beijing | Athletics | Men's discus throw F55/56 |
| Gold | Alphanso Cunningham | (United Kingdom) 2012 London | Athletics | Men's javelin throw F52-53 |

== See also ==
- Jamaica at the Olympics
