= Czech Republic at the 1996 Summer Paralympics =

- IPC code: CZE
- NPC: Czech Paralympic Committee
- Website: www.paralympic.cz

in Atlanta
- Competitors: 43 (36 men and 7 women)
- Medals Ranked 36th: Gold 2 Silver 7 Bronze 1 Total 10

Summer Paralympics appearances (overview)
- 1996; 2000; 2004; 2008; 2012; 2016; 2020; 2024

Other related appearances
- Czechoslovakia (1972–1992)

43 athletes (36 men and 7 women) from Czech Republic competed at the 1996 Summer Paralympics in Atlanta, United States.

== Medallists ==
Medal	Name	Sport	Event
Gold	Stefan Danko	Athletics	Men's javelin F55
Gold	Katerina Coufalova	Swimming	Women's 100m breaststroke SB9
Silver	Milan Kubala	Athletics	Men's discus F35
Silver	Rostislav Pohlmann	Athletics	Men's javelin F56
Silver	Miroslav Janecek	Athletics	Men's shot put F34/37
Silver	Lubomir Simovec	Cycling	Mixed 55/65k bicycle LC2
Silver	Michal Stefanu	Table tennis	Men's singles 4
Silver	Jolana Davidkova	Table tennis	Women's singles 10
Silver	Eva Pestova; Jolana Davidkova	Table tennis	Women's team 6-10
Bronze	Roman Kolek	Athletics	Men's shot put F34/37

== See also ==
- Czech Republic at the Paralympics
- Czech Republic at the 1996 Summer Olympics
