= Švehlík =

Švehlík (feminine Švehlíková) is a Czech and Slovak surname. Notable people with the surname include:

- Aleš Švehlík, Czech paralympic athlete
- Alois Švehlík (1939–2025), Czech actor and theatre pedagogue
- David Švehlík, Czech actor
- Ján Švehlík, Slovak footballer
