= Jamaica at the 2020 Summer Paralympics =

- IPC code: JAM
- NPC: Jamaica Paralympic Association

in Tokyo
- Flag bearers: Sylvia Grant & Theador Subba
- Medals: Gold 0 Silver 0 Bronze 0 Total 0

Summer Paralympics appearances (overview)
- 1968; 1972; 1976; 1980; 1984; 1988; 1992; 1996; 2000; 2004; 2008; 2012; 2016; 2020; 2024

Jamaica competed at the 2020 Summer Paralympics in Tokyo, Japan, originally scheduled to take place in 2020 but postponed to 23 July to 8 August 2021 because of the COVID-19 pandemic.

== Competitors ==
Sport	Men	Women	Total
Athletics	1	1	2
Judo	1	0	1
Taekwondo	0	1	1
Total	2	2	4

== Athletics ==
Athlete	Event	Heat		Final	
Athlete	Event	Result	Rank	Result	Rank
Men
Alberto Campbell-Staines	Men's 400 metres T20	51.55	7	Did not advance	13
Women
Sylvia Grant	Discus throw F57	—		23.12 SB	10

== Judo ==
Athlete	Event	Round of 16	Quarterfinals	Semifinals	Repechage round 1	Repechage round 2	Final / BM	
Athlete	Event	Opposition Result	Opposition Result	Opposition Result	Opposition Result	Opposition Result	Opposition Result	Rank
Theador Subba	+100kg	Bye	Mohammadreza (IRI); L 0s1–10s1 IPP	Did not advance	Ilham (AZE); L 0s1–10s1 IPP	Did not advance		7

== Taekwondo ==
Jamaica qualified one athletes to compete at the Paralympics competition. Shauna-Kay Hines qualified by received the bipartite commission invitation allocation quotas.

Athlete	Event	First round	Quarterfinals	Semifinals	Repachage 1	Repachage 2	Final / BM	
Athlete	Event	Opposition Result	Opposition Result	Opposition Result	Opposition Result	Opposition Result	Opposition Result	Rank
Shauna-Kay Hines	Women's – 58 kg	Salma (EGY); L 9-12	Did not advance		Marija (SRB); L 5-18	Did not advance		9=

== See also ==
- Jamaica at the Paralympics
- Jamaica at the 2020 Summer Olympics
