= Athletics at the 2008 Summer Paralympics – Men's discus throw F53–54 =

Men's Discus F53/54 at the XIII Paralympic Games
- Venue: Beijing National Stadium
- Dates: 14 September
- Competitors: 9 from 8 nations
- Winning distance: 31.08

Medalists
1st place, gold medalist(s)		Fan Liang	China
2nd place, silver medalist(s)		Draženko Mitrović	Serbia
3rd place, bronze medalist(s)		Toshie Oi	Japan

The men's discus F53/54 event at the 2008 Summer Paralympics took place at the Beijing National Stadium on 14 September. There was a single round of competition; after the first three throws, only the top eight had 3 further throws. The competition was won by Fan Liang, representing China.

Rank	Athlete	Nationality	Class	1	2	3	4	5	6	Best	Points	Notes
1st place, gold medalist(s)	Fan Liang	China	F54	30.52	31.08	x	-	-	-	31.08	1130	WR
2nd place, silver medalist(s)	Draženko Mitrović	Serbia	F54	28.09	28.87	28.69	27.73	28.80	29.09	29.09	1058	SB
3rd place, bronze medalist(s)	Toshie Oi	Japan	F53	x	24.22	26.21	22.96	25.15	x	26.21	1032	PR
4	Alphanso Cunningham	Jamaica	F53	25.90	25.52	24.37	23.84	25.15	25.90	25.90	1020	SB
5	Efthymios Kalaras	Greece	F54	26.91	27.98	26.87	27.15	26.94	22.03	27.98	1017	
6	Germano Bernardi	Italy	F54	25.10	25.78	24.90	24.25	24.61	23.42	25.78	937	SB
7	Scot Severn	United States	F53	22.42	23.71	21.29	19.73	21.84	22.58	23.71	934	SB
8	Jovica Brkic	Serbia	F54	24.02	24.49	24.57	23.23	24.32	24.34	24.57	893	
9	Georg Tischler	Austria	F54	21.70	20.25	21.10	-	-	-	21.70	789	

WR = World Record. PR = Paralympic Record. SB = Seasonal Best.
