= Alireza Kamali =

Alireza Kamali may refer to:

- Alireza Kamali (athlete)
- Alireza Kamali (actor)
