= Jamaica at the 2004 Summer Paralympics =

- IPC code: JAM
- NPC: Jamaica Paralympic Association

in Athens
- Competitors: 4 in 1 sport
- Medals Ranked 53rd: Gold 1 Silver 0 Bronze 1 Total 2

Summer Paralympics appearances (overview)
- 1968; 1972; 1976; 1980; 1984; 1988; 1992; 1996; 2000; 2004; 2008; 2012; 2016; 2020; 2024

Jamaica competed at the 2004 Summer Paralympics in Athens, Greece. The team included 4 athletes, 2 men and 2 women. Competitors from Jamaica won 2 medals, including 1 gold, and 1 bronze to finish 53rd in the medal table.

== Medalists ==
Medal	Name	Sport	Event
Gold	Alphanso Cunningham	Athletics	Men's discus throw F53
Bronze	Tanto Campbell	Athletics	Men's discus throw F56

== Athletics ==
=== Men's field ===
Athlete	Class	Event	Final		
Athlete	Class	Event	Result	Points	Rank
Tanto Campbell	F55-56	Javelin	27.96	873	13
Tanto Campbell	F56	Discus	37.04	-	3rd place, bronze medalist(s)
Alphanso Cunningham	F52-53	Javelin	18.46	946	6
Alphanso Cunningham	F53	Discus	25.18 WR	-	1st place, gold medalist(s)

=== Women's field ===
Athlete	Class	Event	Final		
Athlete	Class	Event	Result	Points	Rank
Sylvia Grant	F56-58	Discus	22.69	959	11
Sylvia Grant	F56-58	Javelin	17.12	828	9
Vinnette Green	F54/55	Discus	14.73	976	5

== See also ==
- Jamaica at the Paralympics
- Jamaica at the 2004 Summer Olympics
