= Kateřina Coufalová =

Czech swimmer (born 1983)

Personal information
- Born: 7 July 1983 (age 42) Prague, Czechoslovakia

Sport
- Sport: Paralympic swimming
- Disability class: S9, SB9, SM9
Medal record
Representing Czech Republic
World Championships
Silver medal – second place	1998 Christchurch	100m breaststroke SB9
Paralympic Games
Gold medal – first place	1996 Atlanta	100m breaststroke SB9
Gold medal – first place	2004 Athens	100m breaststroke SB9
Bronze medal – third place	2000 Sydney	200m individual medley SM9

Kateřina Psíková née Coufalová (born 7 July 1983) is a Czech former Paralympic swimmer who competed in international swimming competitions. She is a double Paralympic champion and has competed at the 1996, 2000 and 2004 Summer Paralympics.
