= Jamaica at the 2016 Summer Paralympics =

- IPC code: JAM
- NPC: Jamaica Paralympic Association

in Rio de Janeiro
- Competitors: 3 in 1 sports
- Medals: Gold 0 Silver 0 Bronze 0 Total 0

Summer Paralympics appearances (overview)
- 1968; 1972; 1976; 1980; 1984; 1988; 1992; 1996; 2000; 2004; 2008; 2012; 2016; 2020; 2024

Jamaica competed at the 2016 Summer Paralympics in Rio de Janeiro, Brazil, from 7 September to 18 September 2016.

== Disability classifications ==
Every participant at the Paralympics has their disability grouped into one of five disability categories; amputation, the condition may be congenital or sustained through injury or illness; cerebral palsy; wheelchair athletes, there is often overlap between this and other categories; visual impairment, including blindness; Les autres, any physical disability that does not fall strictly under one of the other categories, for example dwarfism or multiple sclerosis. Each Paralympic sport then has its own classifications, dependent upon the specific physical demands of competition. Events are given a code, made of numbers and letters, describing the type of event and classification of the athletes competing. Some sports, such as athletics, divide athletes by both the category and severity of their disabilities, other sports, for example swimming, group competitors from different categories together, the only separation being based on the severity of the disability.

== Athletics ==
Men's Track

Athlete	Events	Heat		Semifinal		Final	
Athlete	Events	Time	Rank	Time	Rank	Time	Rank
Shane Hudson	400 m T47	49.53	1 Q	—N/a		49.07	4

Men's Field

Athlete	Events	Result	Rank
Alphanso Cunningham	Shot Put F53	5.84	10
Alphanso Cunningham	Javelin F53-54	19.49	5

Women's Field

Athlete	Events	Result	Rank
Dana-Gaye Weller	Club Throw F51	12.21	6

== See also ==
- Jamaica at the 2016 Summer Olympics
