= Austria at the 2004 Summer Paralympics =

- IPC code: AUT
- NPC: Austrian Paralympic Committee
- Website: www.oepc.at (in German)

in Athens
- Competitors: 45 in 8 sports
- Medals Ranked 20th: Gold 8 Silver 10 Bronze 4 Total 22

Summer Paralympics appearances (overview)
- 1960; 1964; 1968; 1972; 1976; 1980; 1984; 1988; 1992; 1996; 2000; 2004; 2008; 2012; 2016; 2020; 2024

Austria competed at the 2004 Summer Paralympics in Athens, Greece. The team included forty-four athletes—forty men and four women. Austrian competitors won twenty-two medals, eight gold, ten silver and four bronze, to finish twentieth in the medal table.

== Medallists ==
Medal	Name	Sport	Event
Gold	Thomas Geierspichler	Athletics	Men's 1500m T52
Gold	Georg Tischler	Athletics	Men's shot put F54
Gold	Bil Marinkovic	Athletics	Men's javelin throw F11
Gold	Andrea Scherney	Athletics	Women's long jump F44/46
Gold	Christoph Etzlstorfer	Cycling	Men's handcycle time trial HC A
Gold	Johann Mayrhofer	Cycling	Men's handcycle road race HC B/C
Gold	Wolfgang Eibeck	Cycling	Men's bicycle road race/time trial LC1
Gold	Stanisław Frączyk	Table tennis	Men's singles class 9
Silver	Thomas Geierspichler	Athletics	Men's 800m T52
Silver	Thomas Geierspichler	Athletics	Men's 5000m T52
Silver	Thomas Geierspichler	Athletics	Men's marathon T52
Silver	Willibald Monschein	Athletics	Men's shot put F11
Silver	Rene Schwarz	Athletics	Men's shot put F54
Silver	Johann Mayrhofer	Cycling	Men's handcycle time trial HC B/C
Silver	Wolfgang Dabernig	Cycling	Men's bicycle road race/time trial LC4
Silver	Wolfgang Eibeck	Cycling	Men's bicycle 4 km individual pursuit LC1
Silver	Hubert Aufschnaiter	Shooting	Mixed sport pistol SH1
Silver	Stanisław Frączyk; Rene Gutdeutsch	Table tennis	Men's teams class 9
Bronze	Thomas Geierspichler	Athletics	Men's 400m T52
Bronze	Dennis Wliszczak	Athletics	Men's high jump F42
Bronze	Christoph Etzlstorfer	Cycling	Men's handcycle road race HC A
Bronze	Hubert Aufschnaiter	Shooting	Men's air pistol SH1

== Sports ==
=== Athletics ===
==== Men's track ====
Athlete	Class	Event	Heats		Semifinal		Final	
Athlete	Class	Event	Result	Rank	Result	Rank	Result	Rank
Gottfried Ferchl	T53	800m	1:50.00	11	did not advance			
Gottfried Ferchl	T54	Marathon	N/A				1:50:19	25
Stefan Gaggl	T46	100m	11.60	8 q	N/A		11.43	5
Stefan Gaggl	T46	200m	22.97	7 q	N/A		23.27	7
Thomas Geierspichler	T52	400m	N/A					3rd place, bronze medalist(s)
Thomas Geierspichler	T52	800m	2:05.18	3 Q	N/A		1:58.69	2nd place, silver medalist(s)
Thomas Geierspichler	T52	1500m	3:59.60	3 Q	N/A		3:49.06 PR	1st place, gold medalist(s)
Thomas Geierspichler	T52	5000m	N/A				13:10.94	2nd place, silver medalist(s)
Thomas Geierspichler	T52	Marathon	N/A				2:06:10	2nd place, silver medalist(s)
Michael Linhart	T44	200m	25.96	10	did not advance			
Bil Marinkovic	T11	100m	12.24	16	did not advance			
Robert Mayer	T44	100m	12.39	7 Q	N/A		12.18	7
Robert Mayer	T44	400m	55.67	6 Q	N/A		55.02	7

==== Men's field ====
Athlete	Class	Event	Final		
Athlete	Class	Event	Result	Points	Rank
Wolfgang Dubin	F36	Discus	29.84	-	6
Wolfgang Dubin	F36	Shot put	DSQ		
Bernhard Eitzinger	F35	Discus	29.52	-	8
Bernhard Eitzinger	F35	Javelin	26.28	-	9
Bernhard Eitzinger	F35	Shot put	9.59	-	10
Bil Marinkovic	F11	Javelin	49.33 WR	-	1st place, gold medalist(s)
Bil Marinkovic	F11	Long jump	5.71	-	10
Willibald Monschein	F11	Shot put	12.27	-	2nd place, silver medalist(s)
Willibald Monschein	F12	Discus	26.83	-	11
Dietmar Schmee	F44/46	Shot put	DNS		
Rene Schwarz	F54	Javelin	18.93	-	7
Rene Schwarz	F54	Shot put	8.95	-	2nd place, silver medalist(s)
Georg Tischler	F54	Discus	22.92	-	8
Georg Tischler	F54	Shot put	9.67 WR	-	1st place, gold medalist(s)
Dennis Wliszczak	F42	High jump	1.68	-	3rd place, bronze medalist(s)

==== Women's field ====
Athlete	Class	Event	Final		
Athlete	Class	Event	Result	Points	Rank
Andrea Scherney	F42-46	Discus	34.54	1067	9
Andrea Scherney	F42-46	Shot put	11.33	1056	5
Andrea Scherney	F44/46	Long jump	5.02	1248 WR	1st place, gold medalist(s)
Evelyn Schmied	F54/55	Discus	12.42	823	9
Evelyn Schmied	F54/55	Shot put	5.23	860	9

=== Boccia ===
==== Mixed individual ====
Athlete	Event	Preliminaries			Round of 16	Quarterfinals	Semifinals	Final	
Athlete	Event	Opponent	Opposition Score	Rank	Opposition Score	Opposition Score	Opposition Score	Opposition Score	Rank
Gerhard Gahleitner	Mixed individual BC1	Beltran (ESP)	L 4-5	6	did not advance				
Gerhard Gahleitner	Mixed individual BC1	Taksee (THA)	L 3-6	6	did not advance				
Gerhard Gahleitner	Mixed individual BC1	Shelly (IRL)	L 1-6	6	did not advance				
Gerhard Gahleitner	Mixed individual BC1	Pearse (GBR)	L 0-11	6	did not advance				
Gerhard Gahleitner	Mixed individual BC1	Villano (ARG)	L 1-5	6	did not advance				
Harald Grossmayer	Mixed individual BC1	Jorgensen (DEN)	L 0-7	2 Q	N/A	Sanders (NZL); W 5-4	Aandalen (NOR); L 3-4	Padtong (THA); L 3-4	4
Harald Grossmayer	Mixed individual BC1	Ibarburen (ARG)	W 11-3	2 Q	N/A	Sanders (NZL); W 5-4	Aandalen (NOR); L 3-4	Padtong (THA); L 3-4	4
Harald Grossmayer	Mixed individual BC1	Hawker (USA)	W 8-0	2 Q	N/A	Sanders (NZL); W 5-4	Aandalen (NOR); L 3-4	Padtong (THA); L 3-4	4
Harald Grossmayer	Mixed individual BC1	Lanoix-Boyer (CAN)	W 5-2	2 Q	N/A	Sanders (NZL); W 5-4	Aandalen (NOR); L 3-4	Padtong (THA); L 3-4	4
Eva Maria Prossegger	Mixed individual BC1	Sanders (NZL)	L 4-13	3	did not advance				
Eva Maria Prossegger	Mixed individual BC1	Fernandez (POR)	L 0-4	3	did not advance				
Eva Maria Prossegger	Mixed individual BC1	Robinson (GBR)	W 3-2	3	did not advance				
Eva Maria Prossegger	Mixed individual BC1	Vanhoek (CAN)	W 7-1	3	did not advance				
Eva Maria Prossegger	Mixed individual BC1	Cid (ESP)	W/O	3	did not advance				
Hubert Steirer	Mixed individual BC2	Siddiqi (DEN)	W 16-0	1 Q	Goncalves (POR); L 2-6	did not advance			
Hubert Steirer	Mixed individual BC2	Mongkolpun (THA)	W 4-3	1 Q	Goncalves (POR); L 2-6	did not advance			
Hubert Steirer	Mixed individual BC2	Murphy (IRL)	W 7-0	1 Q	Goncalves (POR); L 2-6	did not advance			

==== Mixed pairs/teams ====
Athlete	Event	Preliminaries			Semifinals	Final	
Athlete	Event	Opponent	Opposition Score	Rank	Opposition Score	Opposition Score	Rank
Gerhard Gahleitner; Harald Grossmayer; Eva Maria Prossegger; Hubert Steirer	Mixed teams BC1-2	Spain (ESP)	L 4-5	3	did not advance		
Gerhard Gahleitner; Harald Grossmayer; Eva Maria Prossegger; Hubert Steirer	Mixed teams BC1-2	Great Britain (GBR)	L 1-11	3	did not advance		
Gerhard Gahleitner; Harald Grossmayer; Eva Maria Prossegger; Hubert Steirer	Mixed teams BC1-2	Argentina (ARG)	W 5-3	3	did not advance		
Gerhard Gahleitner; Harald Grossmayer; Eva Maria Prossegger; Hubert Steirer	Mixed teams BC1-2	Canada (CAN)	W 12-3	3	did not advance		
Gerhard Gahleitner; Harald Grossmayer; Eva Maria Prossegger; Hubert Steirer	Mixed teams BC1-2	Norway (NOR)	W 13-0	3	did not advance		

=== Cycling ===
==== Men's road ====
Athlete	Event	Time	Rank
Wolfgang Dabernig	Men's road race/time trial LC4	-	2nd place, silver medalist(s)
Wolfgang Eibeck	Men's road race/time trial LC1	-	1st place, gold medalist(s)
Christoph Etzlstorfer	Men's handcycle road race HC div A	1:10:40	3rd place, bronze medalist(s)
Christoph Etzlstorfer	Men's handcycle time trial HC div A	11:55.11	1st place, gold medalist(s)
Alfred Kaiblinger	Men's road race/time trial LC2	-	13
Michael Kurz	Men's road race/time trial CP div 4	-	6
Johann Mayrhofer	Men's handcycle road race HC div B/C	1:17:29	1st place, gold medalist(s)
Johann Mayrhofer	Men's handcycle time trial HC div B/C	18:16.42	2nd place, silver medalist(s)
Wolfgang Schattauer	Men's handcycle road race HC div A	1:13:51	5
Wolfgang Schattauer	Men's handcycle time trial HC div A	12:52.04	4

==== Men's track ====
Athlete	Event	Qualification		1st round		Final	
Athlete	Event	Time	Rank	Time	Rank	Opposition Time	Rank
Wolfgang Dabernig	Men's 1km time trial LC1-4	N/A				1:18.57	30
Wolfgang Dabernig	Men's individual pursuit LC4	4:45.16	3 q	N/A		Beier (GER); L OVL	4
Wolfgang Eibeck	Men's 1km time trial LC1-4	N/A				1:10.74	7
Wolfgang Eibeck	Men's individual pursuit LC1	4:53.90	2 Q	Brechtel (GER); W 4:56.06	2 Q	Brooks (AUS); L 4:58.44	2nd place, silver medalist(s)
Alfred Kaiblinger	Men's 1km time trial LC1-4	N/A				1:18.75	31
Alfred Kaiblinger	Men's individual pursuit LC2	5:44.23	8 Q	Alcaide (ESP); L OVL	-	did not advance	
Michael Kurz	Men's 1km time trial CP div 3/4	N/A				1:22.42	17
Michael Kurz	Men's individual pursuit CP div 4	4:11.17	9	did not advance			

=== Equestrian ===
Athlete	Event	Total	
Athlete	Event	Score	Rank
Thomas Haller	Mixed individual championship test grade II	60.091	15
Thomas Haller	Mixed individual freestyle test grade II	67.333	14

=== Shooting ===
==== Men ====
Athlete	Event	Qualification		Final		
Athlete	Event	Score	Rank	Score	Total	Rank
Hubert Aufschnaiter	Men's 10m air pistol SH1	564	2 Q	94.6	658.6	3rd place, bronze medalist(s)
Hubert Aufschnaiter	Mixed 25m pistol SH1	574	2 Q	98.0	672.0	2nd place, silver medalist(s)
Hubert Aufschnaiter	Mixed 50m pistol SH1	530	3 Q	82.2	612.2	6
Walter Holzner	Men's 10m air rifle standing SH1	588	4 Q	102.5	690.5	6
Walter Holzner	Men's 50m rifle 3 positions SH1	1118	13	did not advance		
Walter Holzner	Mixed 50m rifle prone SH1	568	32	did not advance		
Oscar Kreuzer	Men's 10m air pistol SH1	554	14	did not advance		
Oscar Kreuzer	Mixed 25m pistol SH1	546	15	did not advance		
Oscar Kreuzer	Mixed 50m pistol SH1	512	16	did not advance		
Werner Mueller	Men's 10m air rifle standing SH1	583	10	did not advance		
Werner Mueller	Men's 50m air rifle 3 positions SH1	1127	9	did not advance		
Werner Mueller	Mixed 10m air rifle prone SH1	592	41	did not advance		
Werner Mueller	Mixed 50m rifle prone SH1	566	34	did not advance		

=== Swimming ===
==== Men ====
Athlete	Class	Event	Heats		Final	
Athlete	Class	Event	Result	Rank	Result	Rank
Thomas Rosenberger	SB3	50m breaststroke	57.66	6 Q	57.33	6
Thomas Rosenberger	SM4	150m individual medley	3:06.49	11	did not advance	

==== Women ====
Athlete	Class	Event	Heats		Final	
Athlete	Class	Event	Result	Rank	Result	Rank
Janine Schmid	S7	100m freestyle	1:25.15	12	did not advance	
Janine Schmid	S7	400m freestyle	6:07.73	7 Q	6:02.67	6
Janine Schmid	S7	100m backstroke	1:35.11	5 Q	1:34.96	6

=== Table tennis ===
==== Men ====
Athlete	Event	Preliminaries				Round of 16	Quarterfinals	Semifinals	Final / BM	
Athlete	Event	Opposition Result	Opposition Result	Opposition Result	Rank	Opposition Result	Opposition Result	Opposition Result	Opposition Result	Rank
Manfred Dollmann	Men's singles 3	Kosco (SVK); W 3-0	Rawson (GBR); W 3-2	Scheuvens (GER); W 3-0	1 Q	Bye	Robin (FRA); L 0-3	did not advance		
Stanisław Frączyk	Men's singles 9	Lu (CHN); W 3-0	Chateigner (FRA); L 2-3	N/A	1 Q	Bye	Heijnen (NED); W 3-1	Leibovitz (USA); W 3-0	Lu (CHN); W 3-0	1st place, gold medalist(s)
Rene Gutdeutsch	Men's singles 9	Hsu (TPE); L 1-3	Sérignat (FRA); L 0-3	Cinibulk (CZE); W 3-2	3	did not advance				
Rudolf Hajek	Men's singles 2	Kurkinen (FIN); L 0–3	Boury (FRA); L 0–3	Mardani (IRI); W 3–1	3	did not advance				
Egon Kramminger	Men's singles 3	Kesler (SCG); L 1-3	Glazar (CZE); W 3-2	Siachos (GRE); W 3-0	2 Q	Piñas (ESP); L 2-3	did not advance			
Hans Reup	Men's singles 2	Kim (KOR); L 0-3	Revúcky (SVK); L 0-3	Gruenkemeyer (GER); W 3-0	3	did not advance				
Peter Wolf	Men's singles 3	Guertler (GER); L 0-3	Verger (FRA); L 0-3	Nars (EGY); W 3-1	4	did not advance				

==== Teams ====
Athlete	Event	Preliminaries			Semifinals	Final / BM	
Athlete	Event	Opposition Result	Opposition Result	Rank	Opposition Result	Opposition Result	Rank
Rudolf Hajek; Hans Reup	Men's teams 1-2	France (FRA); L 2-3	Germany (GER); L 1–3	3	did not advance		
Manfred Dollmann; Egon Kramminger; Peter Wolf	Men's teams 3	Germany (GER); L 2-3	Great Britain (GBR); L 1-3	3	did not advance		
Stanisław Frączyk; Rene Gutdeutsch	Men's teams 9	United States (USA); W 3-1	Japan (JPN); W 3-0	1 Q	Chinese Taipei (TPE); W 3-1	Netherlands (NED); L 2-3	2nd place, silver medalist(s)

=== Wheelchair tennis ===
==== Men ====
Athlete	Class	Event	Round of 64	Round of 32	Round of 16	Quarterfinals	Semifinals	Finals
Athlete	Class	Event	Opposition Result	Opposition Result	Opposition Result	Opposition Result	Opposition Result	Opposition Result
Herbert Baumgartner	Open	Men's singles	Silva (SRI); W 6–2, 6–0	Mistry (GBR); L 7–6, 5–7, 1–6	did not advance			
Stefan Krieghofer	Open	Men's singles	Wikstrom (SWE); L 3–6, 1–6	did not advance				
Martin Legner	Open	Men's singles	Peem Mee (THA); W 6–2, 6–0	Tur (ESP); W 6–1, 6–1	Farkas (HUN); W 6–0, 6–1	Welch (USA); L 2–6, 3–6	did not advance	
Adolf Peinsith	Open	Men's singles	Jeremiasz (FRA); DNS	did not advance				
Herbert Baumgartner; Martin Legner	Open	Men's doubles	N/A	Hubbard (RSA) / Victor (RSA); W 6–0, 6–1	Olsson (SWE) / Wikstrom (SWE); L 4–6, 4–6	did not advance		
Stefan Krieghofer; Adolf Peinsith	Open	Men's doubles	N/A	Kruamai (THA) / Peem Mee (THA); L 2–6, 3–6	did not advance			

== See also ==
- Austria at the Paralympics
- Austria at the 2004 Summer Olympics
