= Adrián Paz Velázquez =

Mexican Paralympic athlete (born 1964)

Medal record

Paralympic athletics

Representing Mexico

Paralympic Games
| Gold medal – first place | 1996 Atlanta | Javelin throw F52 |
| Gold medal – first place | 2000 Sydney | Javelin throw F52 |
| Silver medal – second place | 2004 Athens | Javelin throw F52-53 |

Parapan American Games
| Silver medal – second place | 2007 Rio de Janeiro | Javelin throw F33/34/52/53 |

Adrián Paz Velázquez (born 1964) is a paralympic athlete from Mexico competing mainly in category F53 throwing events.

Adrian competed in four Paralympics, firstly in 1996 where as well as competing in the shot and discus he won the F52 javelin. In 2000 he moved to the F53 category and won a second javelin title as well as competing in the shot. He returned at the 2004 Summer Paralympics where he was unable to win a third successive javelin as he was beaten by New Zealand's Peter Martin, both throwing world records in their respective classes. He also threw javelin in the 2008 Summer Paralympics but was unable to win a fourth medal.
