= Jamaica at the 1996 Summer Paralympics =

- IPC code: JAM
- NPC: Jamaica Paralympic Association

in Atlanta
- Competitors: 3 (2 men and 1 woman)
- Medals: Gold 0 Silver 0 Bronze 0 Total 0

Summer Paralympics appearances (overview)
- 1968; 1972; 1976; 1980; 1984; 1988; 1992; 1996; 2000; 2004; 2008; 2012; 2016; 2020; 2024

Three athletes (two men and one woman) from Jamaica competed at the 1996 Summer Paralympics in Atlanta, United States.

== See also ==
- Jamaica at the Paralympics
- Jamaica at the 1996 Summer Olympics
