= Rauno Saunavaara =

Finnish Paralympic athlete

Medal record

Paralympic athletics

Representing Finland

Paralympic Games
Silver medal – second place	1996 Atlanta	Javelin Throw - F53
Silver medal – second place	2004 Athens	Javelin Throw - F54
Bronze medal – third place	2000 Sydney	Javelin Throw - F54

Rauno Saunavaara is a paralympic athlete from Finland competing mainly in category F54 javelin events.

== Biography ==
Rauno has competed in the javelin at the Paralympics three occasions winning a medal on each occasion. His first performance came in 1996 Summer Paralympics where he won a silver medal in the F53 class, he also competed in the shot put but failed to medal in this. In 2000 he won a bronze in the F54 then improved on this in 2004 winning his second silver medal.
