= Athletics at the 2008 Summer Paralympics – Men's discus throw F57–58 =

Men's Discus F57/58 at the XIII Paralympic Games
- Venue: Beijing National Stadium
- Dates: 13 September
- Competitors: 11 from 10 nations
- Winning distance: 57.61

Medalists
1st place, gold medalist(s)		Alexey Ashapatov	Russia
2nd place, silver medalist(s)		Zheng Weihai	China
3rd place, bronze medalist(s)		Rostislav Pohlmann	Czech Republic

The men's discus F57/58 event at the 2008 Summer Paralympics took place at the Beijing National Stadium at 09:00 on 13 September. There was a single round of competition; after the first three throws, only the top eight had 3 further throws. The competition was won by Alexey Ashapatov, representing Russia.

== Results ==
Rank	Athlete	Nationality	Class	1	2	3	4	5	6	Best	Points	Notes
1st place, gold medalist(s)	Alexey Ashapatov	Russia	F58	46.82	57.05	57.61	45.89	41.25	54.00	57.61	1079	WR
2nd place, silver medalist(s)	Zheng Weihai	China	F57	47.72	49.09	46.42	43.27	45.45	48.70	49.09	1052	WR
3rd place, bronze medalist(s)	Rostislav Pohlmann	Czech Republic	F57	43.23	45.48	40.91	42.23	43.62	43.04	45.48	975	SB
4	Ali Ghardooni	Germany	F57	38.98	43.30	43.83	44.57	43.92	44.69	44.69	958	
5	Pasilione Tafilagi	France	F58	50.87	49.96	50.93	38.91	36.86	36.43	50.93	954	SB
6	Mahmoud Ramadan Elattar	Egypt	F58	x	50.72	40.13	49.76	46.62	50.74	50.74	951	
7	Leonardo Amancio	Brazil	F58	42.19	38.75	50.54	45.85	48.04	41.70	50.54	947	SB
8	Chinedu Silver Ezeikpe	Nigeria	F58	49.25	49.18	50.17	50.42	45.80	50.47	50.42	945	SB
9	Xu Chongyao	China	F58	44.83	48.75	x	-	-	-	48.75	913	SB
10	Fernando del Rosario	Mexico	F58	44.43	47.44	47.00	-	-	-	47.44	889	
11	Nathan Stephens	Great Britain	F57	36.26	37.23	38.89	-	-	-	38.89	834	

WR = World Record. SB = Seasonal Best.
