= Jamaica at the 1968 Summer Paralympics =

- IPC code: JAM
- NPC: Jamaica Paralympic Association

in Tel Aviv
- Medals Ranked 14th: Gold 3 Silver 1 Bronze 1 Total 5

Summer Paralympics appearances (overview)
- 1968; 1972; 1976; 1980; 1984; 1988; 1992; 1996; 2000; 2004; 2008; 2012; 2016; 2020; 2024

Jamaica was one of twenty-eight nations that competed at the 1968 Summer Paralympics in Tel Aviv, Israel from November 4 to 13, 1968. The team finished fourteenth in the medal table and won a total of five medals; three gold, one silver and one bronze. Eleven athletes represented Jamaica at the Games; seven men and four women.

== History ==
Jamaica made their Paralympic Games debut at these Games.

== Archery ==
Seven Jamaican archers competed at the Games, none won a medal. The best result was achieved by Quida White who placed fifth in the St. Nicholas round for paraplegic women; Lewis (Note: Data is taken from the International Paralympic Committee website and is based on information contained/sourced in the original hardcopy final results publications. Some information from earlier Paralympic Games (i.e. 1960 – 1984) is incomplete and is missing first names of some athletes.) finished eleventh in the same event.

== Athletics ==
Seven of Jamaica's competitors took part in athletics. Two medals were won by Jamaican athletes, both gold and both in the precision javelin. Excell took the men's title, with a score of 74, and Baracatt the women's, with a score of 78.

== Dartchery ==
The only dartchery event at the Games was the mixed pairs event which took a knockout format. Two Jamaican pairs entered; Excell and Hall lost in the first round to the eventual gold medallists from the United States; Long and Baracatt also lost in the first round to British pair Nicholson and Taylor.

== Swimming ==
Three Jamaican swimmers competed at the Games. Patrick Reid took part in two men's class 2 complete classification events but failed to advance past the heats in either. Octavius Morgan competed in three men's class 4 incomplete classification events and achieved a best finish of fifth in the breaststroke. Jamaica's two swimming medals were both won by Meikle; she won gold in the women's 50 m breaststroke class 4 incomplete and silver in the 50 m freestyle.

== Table tennis ==
Five Jamaica players took part in table tennis singles events and a pair in the women's doubles. All of the singles players were eliminated at the round of 16 stage. In the women's doubles C event Baracatt and Lewis reached the quarter-finals before losing to Great Britain's Bryant and Barnard, who went on to win the gold medal.

== Weightlifting ==
One athlete entered a weightlifting event for Jamaica. Hall won the bronze medal in the men's lightweight with a lift of 110 kg; the gold was won by Johnsen of Norway with a new world record lift of 150 kg.

== See also ==
- Jamaica at the 1968 Summer Olympics
