= Jamaica at the 1988 Summer Paralympics =

- IPC code: JAM
- NPC: Jamaica Paralympic Association

in Seoul
- Competitors: 5
- Medals Ranked 33rd: Gold 1 Silver 4 Bronze 3 Total 8

Summer Paralympics appearances (overview)
- 1968; 1972; 1976; 1980; 1984; 1988; 1992; 1996; 2000; 2004; 2008; 2012; 2016; 2020; 2024

Jamaica competed at the 1988 Summer Paralympics in Seoul, South Korea. 5 competitors from Jamaica won 8 medals including 1 gold, 4 silver and 3 bronze and finished 33rd in the medal table.

== See also ==
- Jamaica at the Paralympics
- Jamaica at the 1988 Summer Olympics
