= Jamaica at the 1972 Summer Paralympics =

- IPC code: JAM
- NPC: Jamaica Paralympic Association

in Heidelberg
- Competitors: 20
- Medals Ranked 10th: Gold 8 Silver 3 Bronze 4 Total 15

Summer Paralympics appearances (overview)
- 1968; 1972; 1976; 1980; 1984; 1988; 1992; 1996; 2000; 2004; 2008; 2012; 2016; 2020; 2024

Jamaica sent a delegation to compete at the 1972 Summer Paralympics in Heidelberg, West Germany. They sent twenty competitors, thirteen male and seven female.

== Team ==
They sent twenty competitors, thirteen male and seven female. Leone Williams was the country's best performer at these Games, winning five total medals, four on the track and one in the pool.

== Medals ==
Going into the 2016 Games, Jamaica's performance in Heidelberg continued to be their best ever. They won eight gold, three silver medals and a bronze medal.

== Athletics ==
Leone Williams won four medals in athletics at the 1972 Games, three golds and one silver.

== Swimming ==
Leone Williams won a silver in the women's 100m backstroke 6 event.
