= Jamaica at the 1992 Summer Paralympics =

- IPC code: JAM
- NPC: Jamaica Paralympic Association

in Barcelona
- Competitors: 4
- Medals Ranked 51st: Gold 0 Silver 1 Bronze 2 Total 3

Summer Paralympics appearances (overview)
- 1968; 1972; 1976; 1980; 1984; 1988; 1992; 1996; 2000; 2004; 2008; 2012; 2016; 2020; 2024

Jamaica competed at the 1992 Summer Paralympics in Barcelona, Spain. 4 competitors from Jamaica won 3 medals, 1 silver and 2 bronze, finishing 47th in the medal table.

== See also ==
- Jamaica at the Paralympics
- Jamaica at the 1992 Summer Olympics
