= Toshie Oi =

Japanese Paralympic athlete

Medal record

Paralympic athletics

Representing Japan

Paralympic Games
Silver medal – second place	2004 Athens	Discus Throw – F53
Bronze medal – third place	2008 Beijing	Discus Throw - F53/54

Toshie Oi (大井 利江, Ōi Toshie; born August 27, 1945) is a Paralympian athlete from Japan competing mainly in category F53 discus events.

Toshie has competed at two Paralympics, firstly in Athens in 2004 where he won the silver medal in the F53 discus and secondly in Beijing in 2008 where he won the bronze medal in the combined F53/54 class discus.
