= Jamaica at the 2024 Summer Paralympics =

- IPC code: JAM
- NPC: Jamaica Paralympic Association

in Paris, France August 28, 2024 – September 8, 2024
- Competitors: 1 in 1 sport
- Flag bearer: Theodor Rahjane Thomas
- Medals: Gold 0 Silver 0 Bronze 0 Total 0

Summer Paralympics appearances (overview)
- 1968; 1972; 1976; 1980; 1984; 1988; 1992; 1996; 2000; 2004; 2008; 2012; 2016; 2020; 2024

Jamaica competed at the 2024 Summer Paralympics in Paris, France, from 28 August to 8 September 2024. This was the nation's fourteenth time competing at the Summer Paralympic Games after it made its debut at the 1968 Summer Paralympics. The delegation consisted of only one competitor from one sport.

== Competitors ==
The following is the list of number of competitors in the Games.

Sport	Men	Women	Total
Athletics	1	0	1
Total	1	0	1

== Athletics ==
Athlete	Event	Final	
Athlete	Event	Result	Rank
Theodor Rahjane Thomas	Men's long jump T20	6,01	11°

== See also ==
- Jamaica at the 2024 Summer Olympics
- Jamaica at the Paralympics
