= Nicolas Savant-Aira =

French wheelchair table tennis player

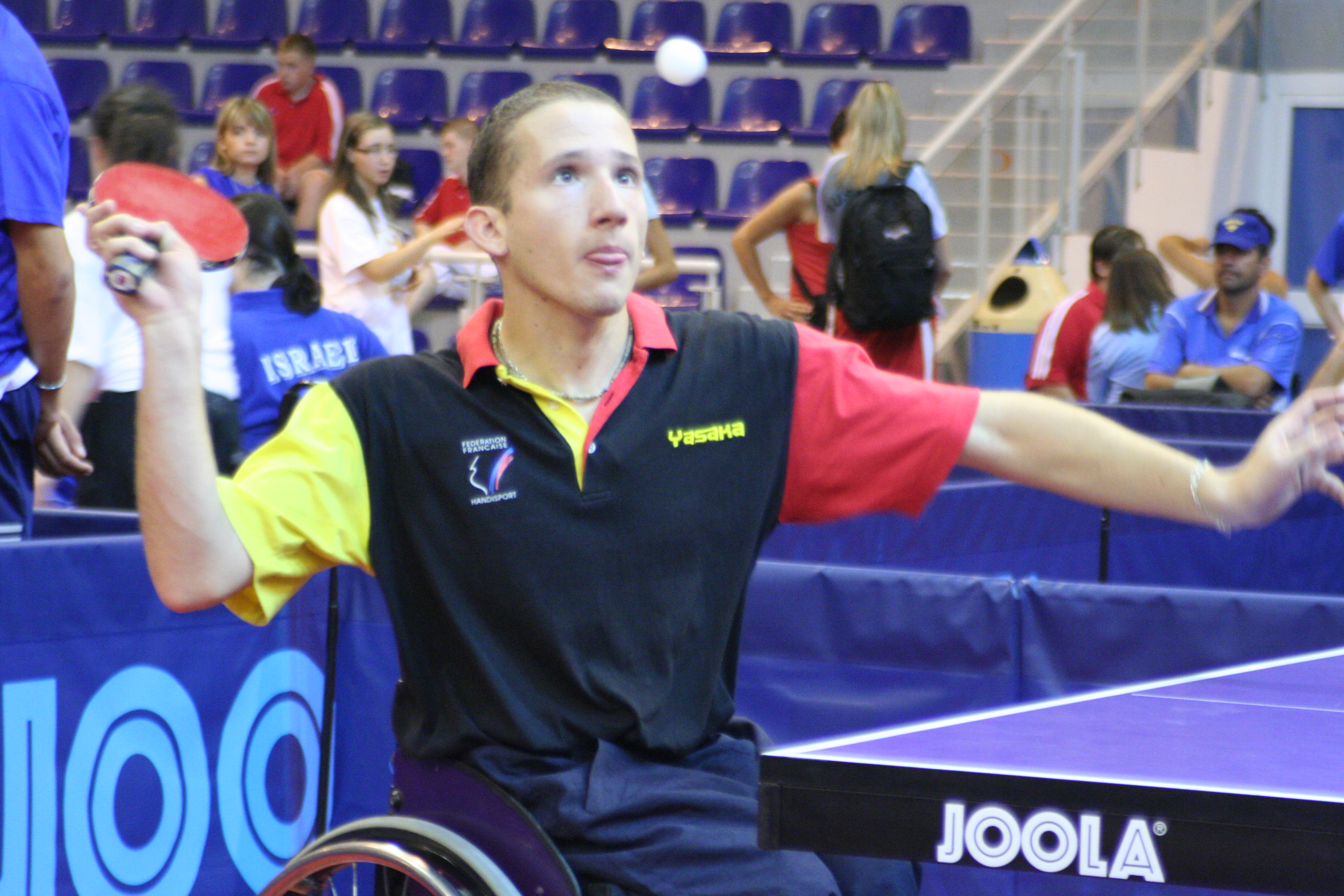

Personal information
- Nickname: Niko
- Nationality: France
- Born: 3 November 1980 (age 45) Aix-en-Provence, France
- Height: 1.53 m (5 ft 0 in)
- Weight: 43 kg (95 lb)

Sport
- Sport: Table tennis
- Club: Olimpique Hyerois, Toulon
- Playing style: Shakehand, defensive
Medal record
Men's para table tennis
Representing France
Paralympic Games
| Bronze medal – third place | 2012 London | Team Class 4–5 |
European Championships
| Gold medal – first place | 2007 Kranjska Gora | Team Class 5 |
| Gold medal – first place | 2011 Split | Singles Class 5 |
| Silver medal – second place | 2009 Genoa | Singles Class 5 |
| Bronze medal – third place | 2011 Split | Team Class 5 |

Nicolas Savant-Aira (born 30 November 1980) is a French wheelchair table tennis player competing in Class 5. He is currently playing for French club Olimpique Hyerois.

== General interest ==
Savant-Aira began playing table tennis aged 12 in Aix-en-Provence. For ten years he also practiced swimming at the same club, reaching national level in competitions. He is a double French national champion. By claiming gold at the 2011 European Championships in Split, Croatia, he qualified directly for the London 2012 Paralympics. Besides being an elite level athlete, he studied for a BTS (Brevet de Technicien Supérieur) and works as an IT developer.

== Career record ==
=== European Championships ===
(gold) 2011 Split: Men's Singles Class 5
(gold) 2007 Kranjska Gora: Men's Team Class 5
(silver) 2009 Genoa: Men's Singles Class 5
(bronze) 2011 Split: Men's Team Class 5
