= Jana Hoffmanová =

Czech Paralympic swimmer

Personal information
- Born: 19 February 1973 (age 53) Prague, Czechoslovakia

Sport
- Sport: Paralympic swimming
- Disability class: S3
- Event(s): Backstroke, freestyle
Medal record
Representing Czech Republic
Paralympic Games
Gold medal – first place	2000 Sydney	50m freestyle S3
Bronze medal – third place	2000 Sydney	100m freestyle S3
Bronze medal – third place	2000 Sydney	50m backstroke S3

Jana Hoffmanová (born 19 February 1973) is a Czech former Paralympic swimmer who competed in international swimming competitions. She competed at the 2000 Summer Paralympics where she won two medals, she was also a former world record holder in 50m freestyle S3 where she was the first swimmer to swim under one minute.
