= Jamaica at the 1984 Summer Paralympics =

- IPC code: JAM
- NPC: Jamaica Paralympic Association

in Stoke Mandeville/New York
- Competitors: 1
- Medals: Gold 0 Silver 0 Bronze 0 Total 0

Summer Paralympics appearances (overview)
- 1968; 1972; 1976; 1980; 1984; 1988; 1992; 1996; 2000; 2004; 2008; 2012; 2016; 2020; 2024

Jamaica competed at the 1984 Summer Paralympics in Stoke Mandeville, Great Britain and New York City, United States. 1 competitor from Jamaica won no medals and so did not place in the medal table.

== See also ==
- Jamaica at the Paralympics
- Jamaica at the 1984 Summer Olympics
