= Mohamed Hassani =

Egyptian Paralympic athlete

Medal record

Paralympic athletics

Representing Egypt

Paralympic Games
Bronze medal – third place	2004 Athens	Discus Throw - F53

Mohamed Hassani is a paralympic athlete from Egypt competing mainly in category F53 discus events.

Mohamed competed in the 1996 Summer Paralympics in the F53 discus. Having missed the 2000 games he returned in 2004 to win the bronze medal in the F53 discus.
