= Jamaica at the 1980 Summer Paralympics =

- IPC code: JAM
- NPC: Jamaica Paralympic Association

in Arnhem
- Competitors: 13
- Medals Ranked 18th: Gold 7 Silver 7 Bronze 5 Total 19

Summer Paralympics appearances (overview)
- 1968; 1972; 1976; 1980; 1984; 1988; 1992; 1996; 2000; 2004; 2008; 2012; 2016; 2020; 2024

Jamaica competed at the 1980 Summer Paralympics in Arnhem, Netherlands. 13 competitors from Jamaica won 19 medals including 7 gold, 7 silver and 5 bronze, and finished 18th in the medal table.

== See also ==
- Jamaica at the Paralympics
- Jamaica at the 1980 Summer Olympics
