= Fan Liang =

Chinese Paralympic athlete

Medal record

Paralympic athletics

Representing China

Paralympic Games
Gold medal – first place	2004 Athens	Discus Throw – F54
Gold medal – first place	2008 Beijing	Discus Throw – F53/54

Fan Liang is a Paralympian athlete from China competing mainly in category F54 discus events.

Fan has won the discus in two Paralympics, he won the F54 class in 2004 and the combined F53/54 class in 2008
