= Ali Naderi =

Iranian Paralympic athlete

Medal record

Paralympic athletics

Representing Iran

Paralympic Games
| Gold medal – first place | 2004 Athens | Javelin Throw - F55-56 |

Ali Naderi is a paralympic athlete from Iran competing mainly in seated discus and javelin events in the F55 classification.

Naderi competed in the 2004 Summer Paralympics where as well as competing in the discus he won the F55-56 combined javelin.

He holds the world record hold in javelin for F55 classified athletes.
