= Yolanda Jurado =

Spanish para-swimmer

Yolanda Jurado Núñez is a Spanish para-swimmer. She won the silver medal in the 50m breaststroke (S14 classification) at the 2000 Paralympic Games in Sydney, Australia.

== Career ==
At the 2000 Paralympic Games in Sydney, Australia, Jurado won the silver medal in the 50m breaststroke with a time of 37.18 seconds. She also competed in backstroke, butterfly, freestyle and medley events.
