= Sarah Newland =

Jamaican athlete and swimmer (1946–2022)

Sarah Newland-Martin
Personal information
- Born: 5 August 1946 Kingston, Jamaica
- Died: 8 June 2022 (aged 75) Kingston, Jamaica

Sport
- Country: Jamaica
- Sport: Paralympic swimming
Medal record
Representing Jamaica
Paralympic Games
Paralympic athletics
Gold medal – first place	1980 Arnhem	100m D1
Paralympic swimming
Gold medal – first place	1980 Arnhem	100m breaststroke D1
Silver medal – second place	1980 Arnhem	3x50m individual medley D1

Sarah Newland-Martin OD (5 August 1946 – 8 June 2022) was a Jamaican Paralympic athlete and swimmer who competed at the 1980 Summer Paralympics where she won two gold medals and one silver medal in athletics and swimming.

Newland-Martin died on 8 June 2022 in Kingston following a brief illness, Prime Minister Andrew Holness described Newland-Martin as "a national treasure and an exceptional Jamaican who contributed to the development of volunteerism, social work and the community of people living with disabilities" where she was an advocate and served as the national General Secretary for the YMCA for 36 years.
