= Chen Yonggang =

Chinese Paralympic athlete

Medal record

Track and field (athletics)

Representing China

Paralympic Games
Gold medal – first place	2004 Athens	Discus Throw - F58

Chen Yonggang is a paralympic athlete from China competing mainly in category F58 Shot put and discus events.

Chen competed in the 2004 Summer Paralympics in the F58 shot put and won gold in the F58 discus at the same games.
