= Christoph Etzlstorfer =

Austrian Paralympic athlete (born 1963)

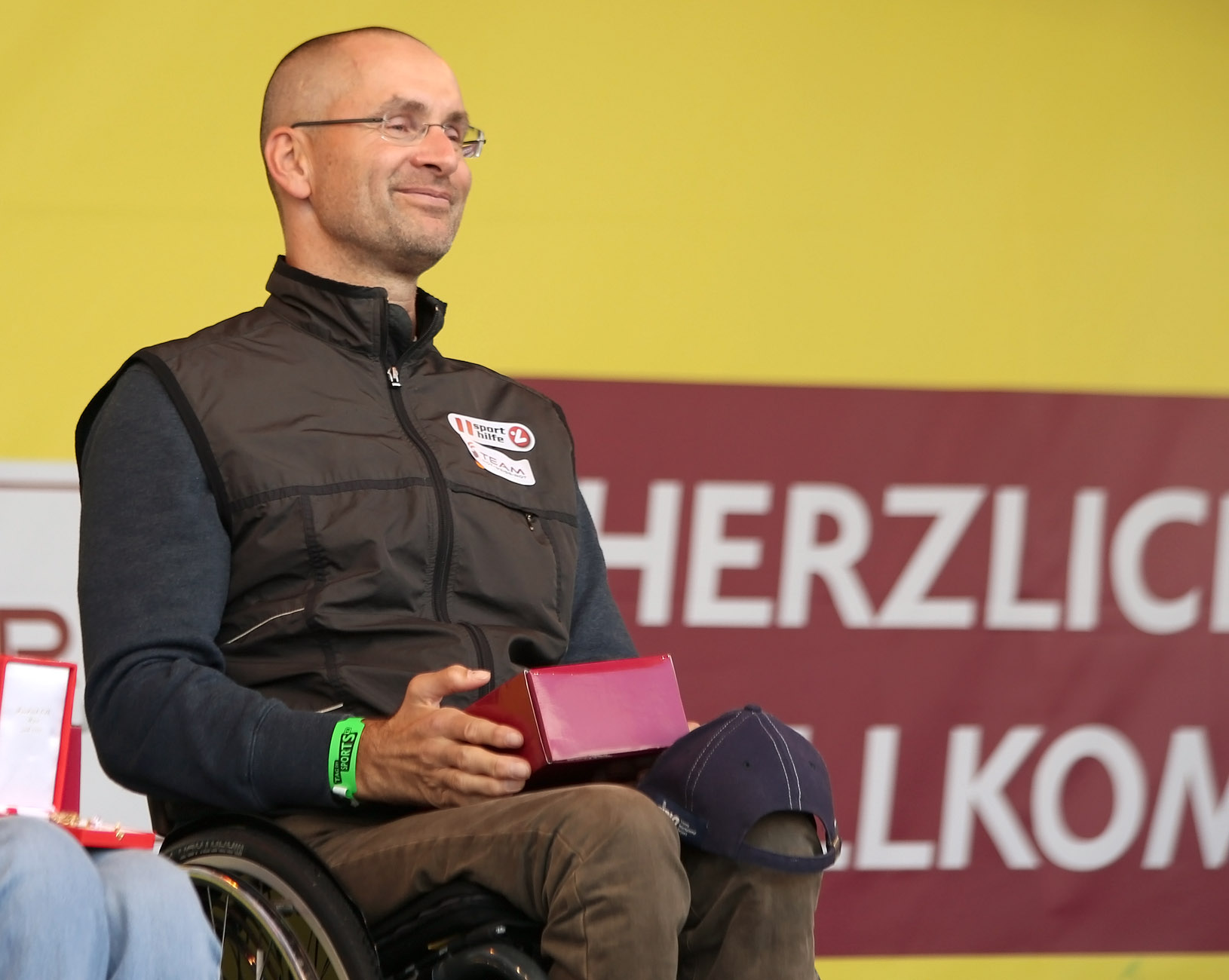

Personal information
- Nationality: Austrian
- Born: 1963 (age 62–63) Graz

Sport
- Country: Austria
- Sport: Para-cycling
Medal record
Paralympic Games

Christoph Etzlstorfer (born 1963) is an Austrian who has competed in the Paralympics since 1984. He has won eight medals, including a gold at the 2004 Summer Paralympics.
