= Ivana Kumpoštová =

Czech Paralympic swimmer

Personal information
- Born: 1980 (age 45–46)

Sport
- Sport: Paralympic swimming
Medal record
Representing Czech Republic
World Championships
Gold medal – first place	1998 Christchurch	50m breaststroke SB14
Paralympic Games
Gold medal – first place	2000 Sydney	50m breaststroke SB14
Silver medal – second place	2000 Sydney	50m butterfly S14

Ivana Kumpoštová (born 1980 or 1981) is a Czech former Paralympic swimmer who competed in international swimming competitions. She is a World Paralympic champion at breaststroke over 50 metres, she competed at the 2000 Summer Paralympics where she won two medals.
