= Peter Martin (athlete) =

New Zealand Paralympic athlete

Medal record

Men's para athletics

Representing New Zealand

Paralympic Games
Gold medal – first place	1996 Atlanta	Shot put – F52
Gold medal – first place	2000 Sydney	Shot put – F53
Gold medal – first place	2004 Athens	Shot put – F52
Gold medal – first place	2004 Athens	Javelin throw – F52–53
Silver medal – second place	1996 Atlanta	Javelin throw – F52
Bronze medal – third place	2000 Sydney	Pentathlon – P53
Bronze medal – third place	2004 Athens	Discus throw – F52

Peter Raymon Martin MNZM (born 23 February 1962) is a Paralympian athlete from New Zealand competing in seated throwing events. He is a farmer, and became quadriplegic after sustaining a spinal injury in a farm bike accident. He competes in the F52 classification.

== Biography ==
Martin won the shot put in the 1996, 2000 and 2004 Paralympics. He also won the javelin in 2004 and a silver in 1996. Other events he has medalled in are the 2000 Pentathlon and the 2004 discus throw, making 2004 his most successful year with two gold medals and one bronze. He made a comeback for the 2012 Summer Paralympics; he reached finals but did not medal in his shot put and javelin events. Immediately prior to these games, he inadvertently took a banned substance for medical reasons. He was reprimanded but cleared to compete.

Martin remains the current F52 world record holder in javelin and has previously held world records in shot put and pentathlon.

In the 2005 New Year Honours, Martin was made a Member of the New Zealand Order of Merit, for services to paralympic sport.
