= Timothy Hawker =

American boccia player

Timothy J. Hawker (born May 8, 1980) is an American boccia player.
