= Silver Ezeikpe =

Nigerian Paralympic athlete

Medal record

Paralympic athletics

Representing Nigeria

Paralympic Games
Gold medal – first place	2004 Athens	Javelin Throw - F58

Chinedu Silver Ezeikpe is a paralympic athlete from Nigeria (born 2 April 1971) competing mainly in category F58 throws events.

Silver competed in the shot and javelin in the 2004 Summer Paralympics winning the gold medal in the F58 javelin and setting a world record. He then competed in the 2008 Summer Paralympics in all three throws but was unable to follow his first games performance, and left with no medals.

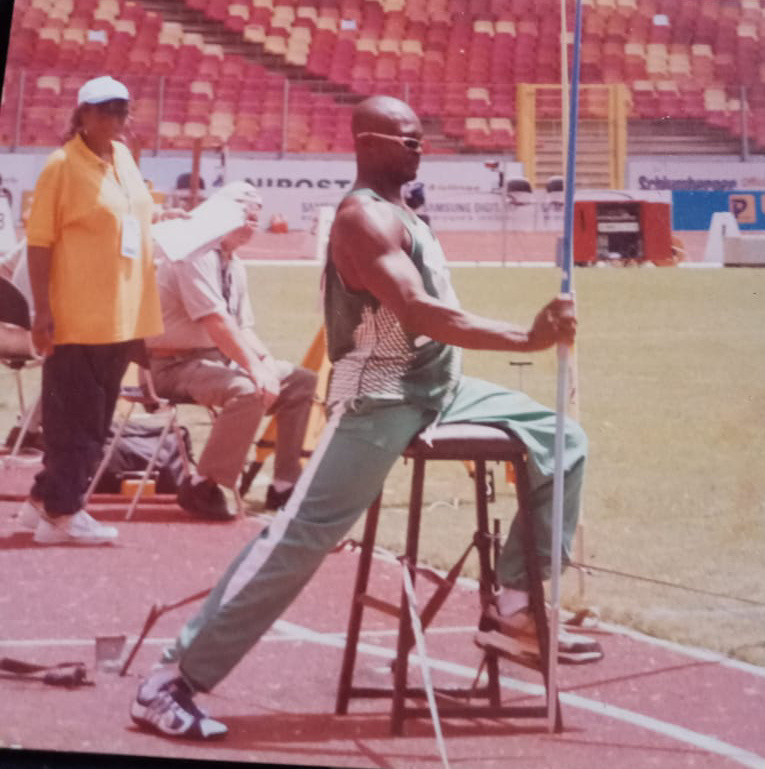
Silver Chinedu Ezeikpe at COJA 2003 Abuja All African paralympic games
