= Martin Zvolánek =

Czech Paralympic athlete (born 1974)

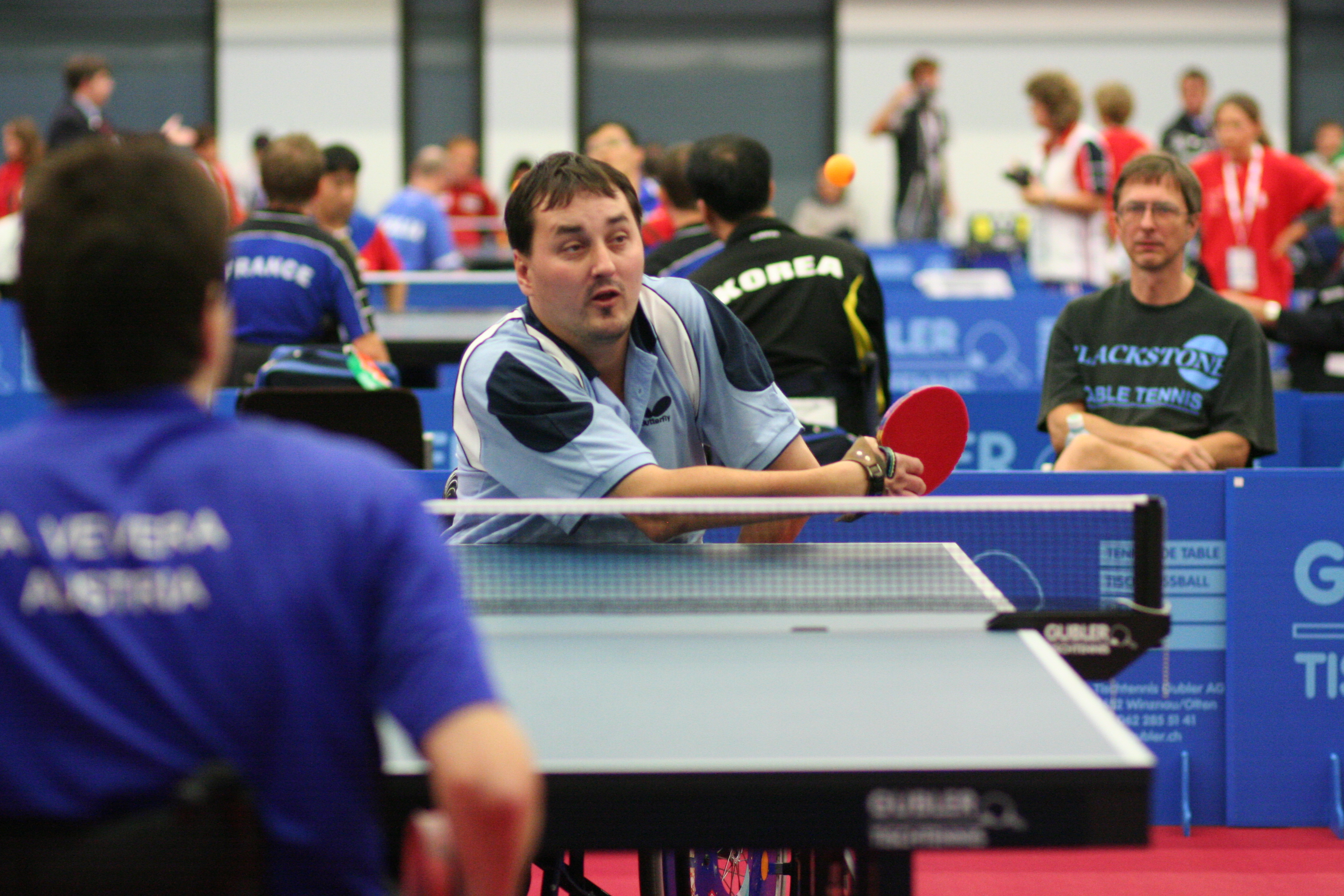
- Zvolánek in 2006

Personal information
- Born: 26 May 1974 (age 52) Pardubice, Czechoslovakia
Medal record
Representing the Czech Republic
Paralympic Games
Para table tennis
| Silver medal – second place | 2000 Sydney | Team class 1–2 |
| Bronze medal – third place | 2000 Sydney | Class 2 |
Para athletics
| Bronze medal – third place | 2008 Beijing | Discus throw F32/51 |

Martin Zvolánek (born 26 May 1974) is a Czech Paralympic athlete competing mainly in category F32/51 discus events.

Zvolánekhas competed in two Paralympics. His first in 2000 in Sydney was in table tennis where he won a bronze in the singles class 2 and with his teammates won a silver in the team class 1–2. After missing 2004 he competed in the athletics in 2008 he won a bronze in the combined F32/51 discus and competed in the club throw.
