= Alireza Kamali (athlete) =

Iranian Paralympic athlete

Medal record

Paralympic athletics

Representing Iran

Paralympic Games
| Bronze medal – third place | 2004 Athens | Discus Throw - F58 |

Alireza Kamali is a paralympic athlete from Iran competing mainly in category F58 discus throw events.

Kamali competed in the 2004 Summer Paralympics in Athens where he finished third in the F58 discus.
