= René Tauš =

Czech para table tennis player

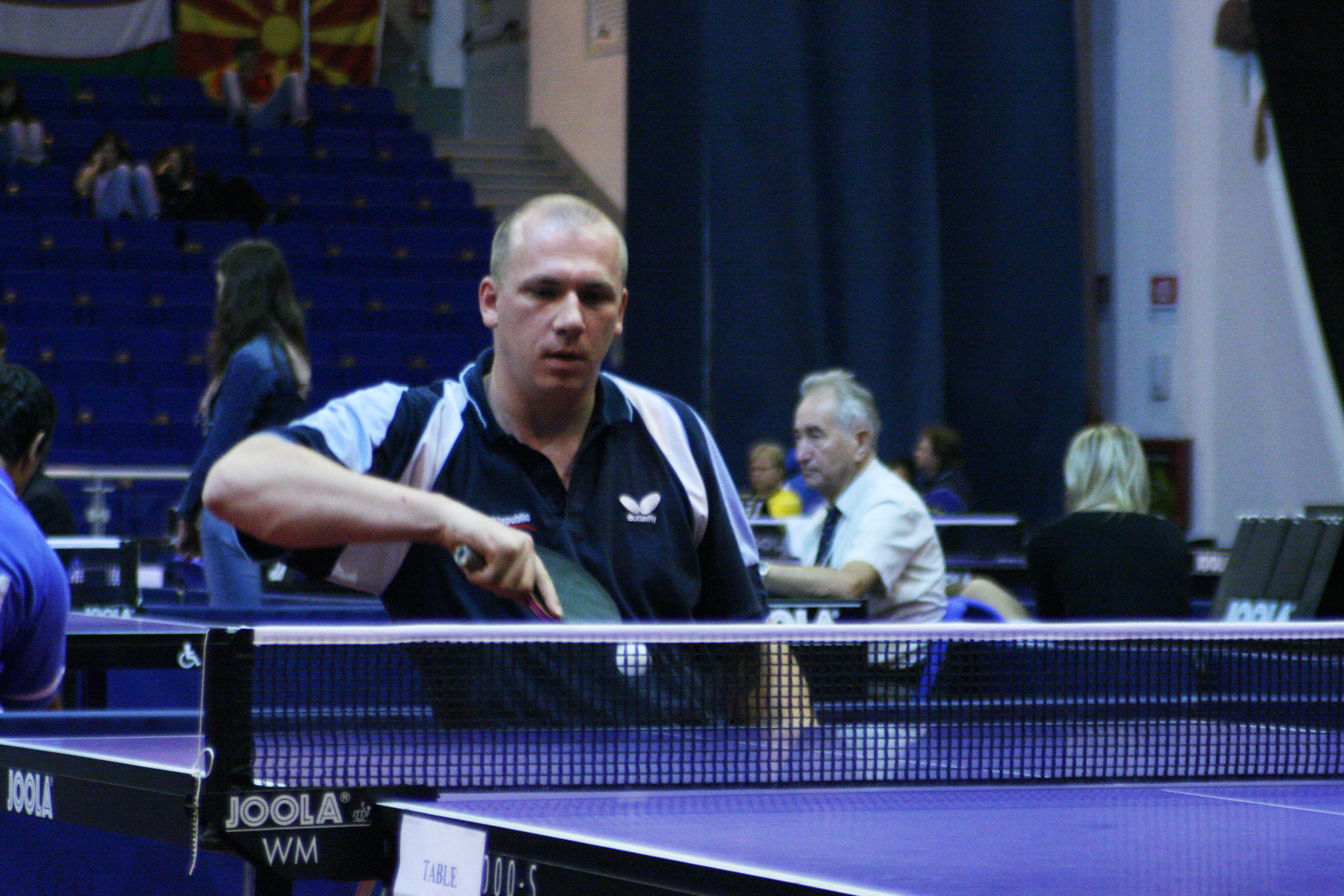

Personal information
- Born: 30 November 1971 (age 54) Česká Lípa, Czechoslovakia

Sport
- Sport: Para table tennis
- Disability class: C5
Medal record
Para table tennis
Representing Czech Republic
Paralympic Games
| Gold medal – first place | 2004 Athens | Men's teams C5 |
European Championships
| Gold medal – first place | 2003 Zagreb | Men's teams C5 |
| Gold medal – first place | 2009 Genoa | Men's singles C5 |
| Silver medal – second place | 2005 Jesolo | Men's singles C5 |
| Silver medal – second place | 2009 Genoa | Men's teams C5 |
| Silver medal – second place | 2011 Split | Men's teams C5 |
| Bronze medal – third place | 1999 Piešťany | Men's teams C5 |
| Bronze medal – third place | 2005 Jesolo | Open singles standing |

René Tauš (born 30 November 1971) is a Czech retired para table tennis player who competed at international table tennis competitions. He is a Paralympic champion and a two-time European champion in team events, Tauš has won his titles alongside Jiří Suchánek and Jaroslav Hadrava.
