= Rico Glagla =

German Paralympic athlete

Medal record

Paralympic athletics

Representing Germany

Paralympic Games
Silver medal – second place	2004 Athens	Discus Throw - F52
Bronze medal – third place	2004 Athens	Shot Put - F52

Rico Glagla is a paralympic athlete from Germany competing mainly in category F52 shot put events.

== Biography ==
Glagla competed in the 2004 Summer Paralympics, winning silver in the F52 discus, a bronze in the shot put and finished seventh in the javelin.
