= Radim Běleš =

Czech Paralympic athlete

Personal information
- Born: 6 March 1973 (age 53) Ostrava, Czechoslovakia
Medal record
Men's para athletics
Representing Czech Republic
Paralympic Games
Gold medal – first place	2004 Athens	Discus throw – F32/51
Silver medal – second place	2004 Athens	Club throw – F32/51
Silver medal – second place	2012 London	Club throw – F31/32/51
European Championships
Silver medal – second place	2016 Grosseto	Club throw - F51

Radim Běleš (born 6 March 1973) is a Czech Paralympic athlete competing mainly in category F51 club throwing and discus events.

Běleš competed in the 2000 Summer Paralympics in the club throwing event, without winning a medal. He won a silver medal in that event in the 2004 Summer Paralympics where he also won the gold in the F32/51 discus event. He competed at both the 2008 Summer Paralympics in Beijing and the 2012 Summer Paralympics in London, taking silver in the club throw at the latter.
