= Michael Louwrens =

South African Paralympic athlete

Medal record

Paralympic athletics

Representing South Africa

Paralympic Games
Gold medal – first place	1996 Atlanta	Shot Put - F56
Gold medal – first place	2000 Sydney	Shot Put - F57
Gold medal – first place	2004 Athens	Shot Put - F57
Bronze medal – third place	2012 London	Shot Put - F57-58

Michael Louwrens is a paralympic athlete from South Africa competing mainly in category F57 shot put and discus events.

Michael won three Paralympic gold medals in the shot put winning in 1996, 2000 and 2004. At each of these games he also competed in the discus but was unable to win a medal in the discus. His fourth and final games came in 2008 but could only finish fifth in the shot put, the first time in the Paralympics that he had not won the gold medal.
