= Zheng Weihai =

Chinese Paralympic athlete

Medal record

Paralympic athletics

Representing China

Paralympic Games
Silver medal – second place	2004 Athens	Discus Throw – F57
Silver medal – second place	2008 Beijing	Discus Throw - F57/58

Zheng Weihai is a Paralympian athlete from China competing mainly in category F57 discus events.

Zheng competed in all three class F57 throwing events in the 2004 Summer Paralympics in Athens, winning a silver medal in the discus. In 2008 in his home country competing only in the discus he again won a silver medal in the combined F57/58 category.
