= Rene Gutdeutsch =

Austrian para table tennis player

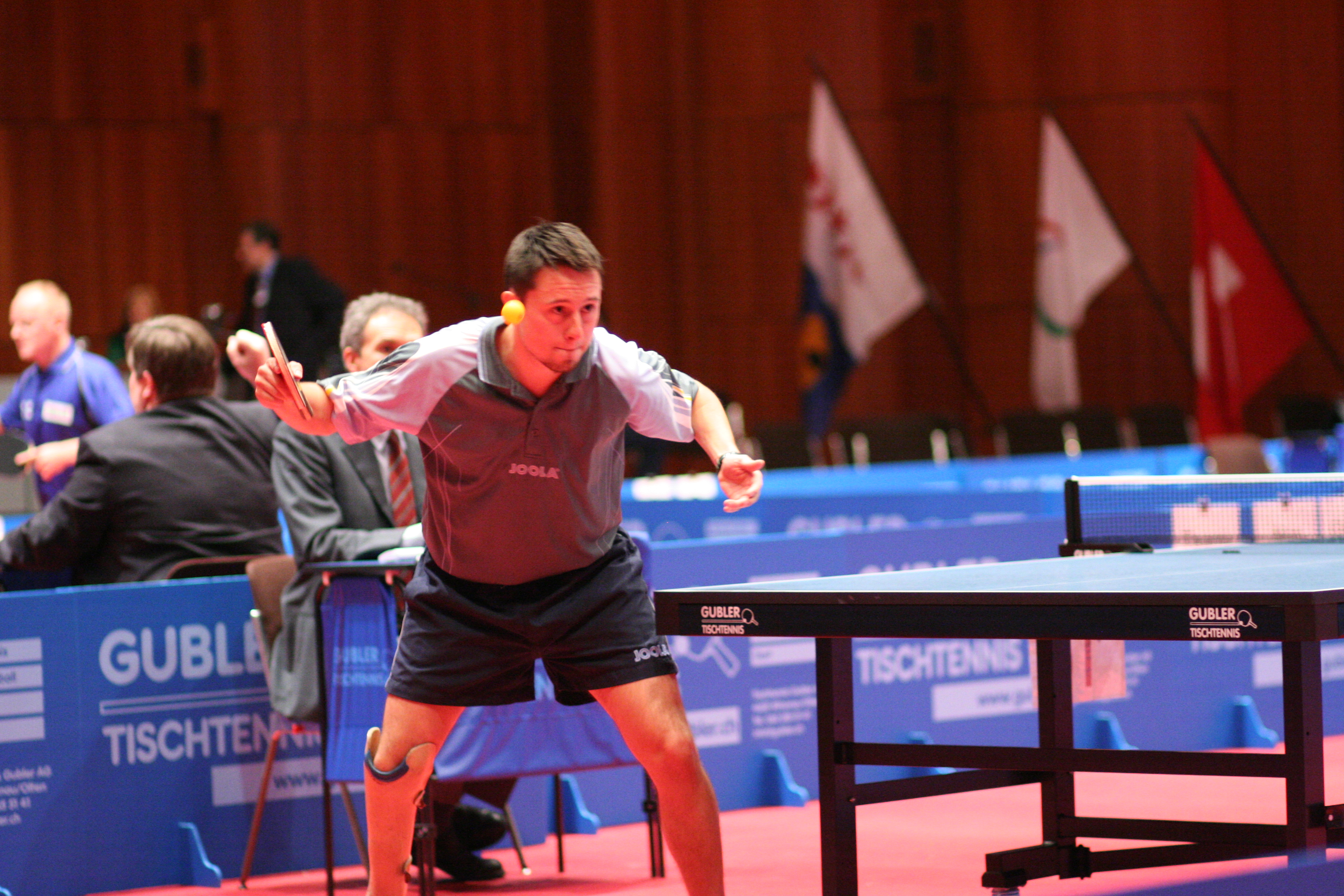
- Gutdeutsch at 2006 World Para Table Tennis Championships

Personal information
- Born: 20 March 1981 (age 45)

Sport
- Country: Austria
- Sport: Para table tennis
- Disability class: C9
Medal record
Para table tennis
Representing Austria
Paralympic Games
Silver medal – second place	2004 Athens	Men's teams C9
European Championships
Gold medal – first place	2003 Zagreb	Men's teams C9
Bronze medal – third place	2005 Jesolo	Men's teams C9

Rene Gutdeutsch (born 20 March 1981) is an Austrian former para table tennis player who competed at international elite competitions. He is a Paralympic silver medalist and a European champion in team events alongside Stanislaw Fraczyk. He was born with a shortened right leg.
