= Rene Schwarz =

Austrian Paralympic athlete

Medal record

Men's para-athletics

Representing Austria

Paralympic Games
| Silver medal – second place | 2004 Athens | Shot put F54 |

Rene Schwarz is a paralympic athlete from Austria competing mainly in category F54 throwing events.

Rene competed in the 2004 Summer Paralympics in the F54 javelin and shot put, winning a silver medal in the shot put.
