= František Pürgl =

Czech Paralympic athlete

Personal information
- Born: 26 August 1965 (age 61)
Medal record
Paralympic athletics
Representing Czech Republic
Paralympic Games
Silver medal – second place	2000 Sydney	Discus Throw - F54
Bronze medal – third place	2004 Athens	Discus Throw - F54

František Pürgl (born 26 August 1965) is a Paralympic athlete from the Czech Republic competing mainly in category F54 events.

František has competed in the javelin and discus events in the 2000 and 2004 Paralympics. In the latter event, he won both his Paralympic medals, a silver in 2000 and a bronze in 2004.
