= Aleš Švehlík =

Czech Paralympic athlete

Personal information
- Born: 18 February 1966 (age 60)
Medal record
Paralympic athletics
Representing Czech Republic
Paralympic Games
Bronze medal – third place	2000 Sydney	5000 metres - T38

Aleš Švehlík (born 18 February 1966) is a Czech paralympic athlete. He competes mainly in category T38 distance running events.

Švehlík has competed in two paralympics, firstly in 2000 Summer Paralympics where he won a bronze medal in the 5000m and competed in the 800m. He also went to the 2004 Summer Paralympics where he competed in the 800m and was part of the Czech Republics T35-38 4 × 100 m.
