= Sylvia Grant =

Jamaican Paralympic athlete

Sport
- Country: Jamaica
- Sport: Paralympic athletics
- Disability class: F57
- Event(s): Discus throw Javelin
Medal record
Paralympic athletics
Representing Jamaica
Paralympic Games
Silver medal – second place	1988 Seoul	Discus 5
Silver medal – second place	1988 Seoul	Javelin 5
Silver medal – second place	1988 Seoul	Pentathlon 5-6
Silver medal – second place	1992 Barcelona	Discus THW7
Bronze medal – third place	1996 Atlanta	Discus F55-57
World Championships
Silver medal – second place	2002 Lille	Discus
Parapan American Games
Gold medal – first place	1999 Mexico City	Discus F57
Gold medal – first place	2003 Mar del Plata	Discus F57
Silver medal – second place	2003 Mar del Plata	Javelin F57
Silver medal – second place	2007 Rio de Janeiro	Javelin F54-58
Silver medal – second place	2011 Guadalajara	Javelin F57

Sylvia Grant OD is a Jamaican retired Paralympic athlete who competed in discus throw and javelin events in international track and field competitions, she is known as Jamaica's most decorated female Paralympian. She is a five-time Paralympic medalist, two-time Parapan American Games champion and a World silver medalist.

In 2021, Grant announced her retirement after competing for more than 25 years and participating in eight Paralympic games.
