= Rostislav Pohlmann =

Czech Paralympic athlete

Personal information
- Born: 1 June 1964 (age 62) Šternberk, Czechoslovakia
Medal record
Paralympic athletics
Representing Czech Republic
Paralympic Games
Gold medal – first place	2004 Athens	Discus Throw – F57
Silver medal – second place	1996 Atlanta	Javelin Throw – F56
Silver medal – second place	2000 Sydney	Javelin Throw – F57
Bronze medal – third place	2004 Athens	Javelin Throw – F57
Bronze medal – third place	2008 Beijing	Discus Throw – F57/58
Bronze medal – third place	2008 Beijing	Javelin Throw - F57/58

Rostislav Pohlmann (born 1 June 1964) is a Czech Paralympic athlete competing mainly in category F57 throwing events.

Pohlmann has competed at four Paralympics, winning at least one medal at each games. He first competed in Atlanta in the 1996 Summer Paralympics where he competed in the discus, javelin and shot put in the F56 class, winning the silver medal in the javelin. Four years later in Sydney at the 2000 Summer Paralympics he again competed in the three throwing events in the F57 category, and won another silver medal in the javelin. In the 2000 Summer Paralympics in Athens he competed in the F57 category in the shot put and won a bronze medal in the javelin and a gold in the discus. At his fourth Paralympics in Beijing he won two bronze medals in the F57/58 discus and javelin having not competed in the shot put.
