= Martin Němec (athlete) =

Czech Paralympic athlete

Personal information
- Born: 24 May 1974 (age 52) Prague
Medal record
Paralympic athletics
Representing Czech Republic
Paralympic Games
Gold medal – first place	2000 Sydney	Discus Throw - F55
Gold medal – first place	2004 Athens	Discus Throw - F55
Silver medal – second place	2000 Sydney	Shot Put - F55
Bronze medal – third place	2008 Beijing	Shot Put - F55/56

Martin Němec (born 24 May 1974 in Prague) is a Paralympian athlete from the Czech Republic, competing mainly in category F55 throwing events.

Martin has competed and won medals at three Paralympic Games. In 2000 in Sydney he won a gold medal in the F55 discus and a silver medal in F55 shot put. Four years later in Athens he competed in the F55-56 javelin and F56 shot put and won the F55 discus gold medal. At the 2008 Summer Paralympics in Beijing he competed in the F55/56 discus and won his fourth Paralympic medal, a bronze, in the F55/56 shot put.
