= Tanto Campbell =

Jamaican Paralympic athlete

Personal information
- Nationality: Jamaican
- Born: 15 January 1986 (age 40)

Sport
- Country: Jamaica
- Sport: Athletics
- Events: F56 Javelin; F56 Discus

Achievements and titles
- Paralympic finals: 2004, 2008, 2012
Medal record
Paralympic Games
Bronze medal – third place	2004 Athens	Discus throw F56
Bronze medal – third place	2008 Beijing	Discus throw F55/56
Parapan American Games
Gold medal – first place	2015 Toronto	Javelin throw F56
Silver medal – second place	2007 Rio de Janeiro	Discus throw F54-56
Silver medal – second place	2011 Guadalajara	Discus throw F54/55/56
Silver medal – second place	2015 Toronto	Discus throw F53/54/55

Tanto Campbell is a Paralympian athlete from Jamaica competing mainly in category F56 discus events.

Campbell is a two time Paralympic bronze medalist having won the bronze medal in discus in 2004 in the F56 class and in 2008 in the F55/56 class. In 2004 he also competed in the F55/56 class javelin. In 2012 Summer Paralympics, he placed 5th in the F54-56 class discus throw.

At the 2015 Parapan American Games in Toronto, Campbell won gold in javelin throw F56 and silver in discus throw F53/54/55 competition.
