= Alphanso Cunningham =

Jamaican Paralympic athlete

Personal information
- Nationality: Jamaican
- Born: 29 August 1980 (age 46)

Sport
- Country: Jamaica
- Sport: Athletics
- Events: F53 Javelin; F53 Discus
- Coached by: Neville Sinclair

Achievements and titles
- Paralympic finals: 2004, 2008, 2012
- Highest world ranking: Javelin: 1st
Medal record
Event	1st	2nd	3rd
Paralympic Games	2	0	0
World Championships	1	1	0
Parapan Games	3	1	2
Track and field (athletics)
Paralympic Games
Gold medal – first place	2004 Athens	Discus throw F53
Gold medal – first place	2012 London	Javelin throw F52/53
World Championships
Gold medal – first place	2013 Lyon	Javelin throw F52/53
Silver medal – second place	2006 Assen	Discus throw F53
Parapan American Games
Gold medal – first place	2007 Rio de Janeiro	Discus throw F32-34/51-52
Gold medal – first place	2011 Guadalajara	Discus throw F51/52/53
Gold medal – first place	2015 Toronto	Discus throw F51/52/53/57
Silver medal – second place	2011 Guadalajara	Javelin throw F52/53
Bronze medal – third place	2007 Rio de Janeiro	Javelin throw F33/34/52/53
Bronze medal – third place	2015 Toronto	Javelin throw F53/54/55

Alphanso Cunningham (born 29 August 1980) is a Paralympian athlete from Jamaica competing mainly in category F53 throwing events.

== Personal life ==
Cunningham was born with osteogenesis imperfecta.

He has one daughter.

== Career history ==
Cunningham competed in the 2004 Summer Paralympics in the javelin and won gold in the F53 discus throw. He competed in the 2008 Beijing Paralympics without winning a medal.

He won gold in the F52/53 javelin at the London 2012 Paralympics.

At the 2015 Parapan American Games in Toronto, Cunningham won gold in discus throw F51/52/53/57 and bronze in javelin throw F53/54/55 competition.

Cunningham finished 5th in javelin F54 and 10th in shot put F53 at the 2016 Summer Paralympics.
