= Powerlifting at the 2024 Summer Paralympics – Qualification =

Qualification for powerlifting at the 2024 Summer Paralympics began on 1 March 2022 and ended on 26 June 2024. There were a total of 180 powerlifters (80 male, 80 female and 20 gender-free).

== Timeline ==
World Para Powerlifting Qualification Pathway 2021-2024	Date	Venue
2021 World Para Powerlifting Championships	27 November – 5 December 2021	(Georgia (country)) Tbilisi
2022 Asia-Oceania Championships	14–20 June 2022	(South Korea) Pyeongtaek
2022 Americas Open Championships	8–11 July 2022	(United States) St. Louis
2022 European Open Championships	24–29 September 2022	(Georgia (country)) Tbilisi
2022 African Open Championships	27–30 October 2022	(Egypt) Cairo
2022 World Para Powerlifting World Cup	15–18 December 2022	(United Arab Emirates) Dubai
2023 World Para Powerlifting World Cup	29 April – 1 May 2023	(Georgia (country)) Tbilisi
2023 World Para Powerlifting World Cup	23–25 June 2023	(Mexico) Veracruz
2023 World Para Powerlifting World Cup	3–5 November 2023	(Egypt) Cairo
2023 World Para Powerlifting World Cup	1–9 December 2023	(Thailand) Nakhon Ratchasima
2023 World Para Powerlifting Championships	23–30 August 2023	(United Arab Emirates) Dubai
2022 Asian Para Games	22–28 October 2023	(China) Hangzhou
2023 Parapan American Games	18–21 November 2023	(Chile) Santiago
2024 World Para Powerlifting World Cup	28 February – 7 March 2024	(United Arab Emirates) Dubai
2024 World Para Powerlifting World Cup	1–4 April 2024	(Thailand) Pattaya
2024 World Para Powerlifting World Cup	23–26 May 2024	(Mexico) Acapulco
2024 World Para Powerlifting World Cup	20–26 June 2024	(Georgia (country)) Tbilisi

== Quotas ==
An NPC can allocate eight male and eight female qualification slots; one eligible athlete per medal event.

Athletes are eligible for qualifying if they have completed the mandatory requirements of the Qualification Pathway 2021–2024, this includes competing at the 2021 and 2023 World Championships, 2022 regional championships and at least two World Para Powerlifting World Cups and are ranked in the preliminary Paralympic ranking list.

== Qualified slots ==
Top ranked eight male and female powerlifters are automatically qualified to compete for their respective bodyweight category, as of 26 June 2024. A number of lifters are qualified across two classifications, and will have to select one to compete in. Athletes in italics have qualified at a lower weight and will have to select a competition weight.

=== Men ===
Weight category	Slots allocated	NPC	Qualified powerlifter
-49 kg	9	Jordan	Omar Qarada
-49 kg	9	Vietnam	Le Van Cong
-49 kg	9	Turkey	Abdullah Kayapinar
-49 kg	9	Algeria	Hadj Ahmed Beyour
-49 kg	9	China	Zheng Yu
-49 kg	9	India	Parmjeet Kumar
-49 kg	9	Hungary	Nándor Tunkel
-49 kg	9	France	Alex Adelaide
-49 kg	9	Saudi Arabia	Adnan Noorsaeed
-54 kg	10	Kazakhstan	David Degtyarev
-54 kg	10	China	Yang Jinglang
-54 kg	10	Vietnam	Nguyen Binh An
-54 kg	10	Iraq	Muslim Al-Sudani
-54 kg	10	Jordan	Mohammad Alshnaiti
-54 kg	10	France	Axel Bourlon
-54 kg	10	Greece	Dimitrios Bakochristos
-54 kg	10	Egypt	Taha Abdelmajid
-54 kg	10	Cuba	Pablo Ramirez Barrientos
-54 kg	10	Azerbaijan	Jeyhun Mahmudov
-59 kg	9	Iran	Mohsen Bakhtiar
-59 kg	9	El Salvador	Herbert Aceituno
-59 kg	9	Egypt	Mohamed Elmenyawy
-59 kg	9	China	Qi Yongkai
-59 kg	9	Greece	Paschalis Kouloumoglou
-59 kg	9	Chile	Juan Carlos Garrido
-59 kg	9	Kazakhstan	Stanislaw Shakiyev
-59 kg	9	Ukraine	Kostiantyn Panasiuk
-59 kg	9	Peru	Diego Quispe
-65 kg	8	China	Zou Yi
-65 kg	8	Iran	Amir Jafari Arangeh
-65 kg	8	Nigeria	Thomas Kure
-65 kg	8	Great Britain	Mark Swan
-65 kg	8	India	Ashok
-65 kg	8	Algeria	Hocine Bettir
-65 kg	8	Chile	Jorge Carinao
-65 kg	8	Egypt	Sherif Osman
-72 kg	8	Malaysia	Bonnie Bunyau Gustin
-72 kg	8	Brazil	Ezequiel Correa
-72 kg	8	Italy	Donato Telesca
-72 kg	8	China	Hu Peng
-72 kg	8	Uzbekistan	Bekzod Jamilov
-72 kg	8	Panama	Rey Melchor Dimas Vasquez
-72 kg	8	Egypt	Mahmoud Attia
-72 kg	8	Turkey	Ugur Yumuk
-80 kg	9	China	Gu Xiaofei
-80 kg	9	Iran	Roohallah Rostami
-80 kg	9	Iraq	Rasool Mohsin
-80 kg	9	Refugee Paralympic Team	Hadi Darvishpoor
-80 kg	9	South Korea	Kim Gyuho
-80 kg	9	Great Britain	Matthew Harding
-80 kg	9	Dominican Republic	Jesus Rodriguez Vallejo
-80 kg	9	Brazil	Ailton Bento De Souza
-80 kg	9	Ivory Coast	Adou Herve Ano
-88 kg	10	China	Yan Panpan
-88 kg	10	Egypt	Mohamed Elelfat
-88 kg	10	Ukraine	Yurii Babynets
-88 kg	10	Australia	Ben Wright
-88 kg	10	Uzbekistan	Khusniddin Usmanov
-88 kg	10	United Arab Emirates	Mohammed Khamis Khalaf
-88 kg	10	Kazakhstan	Rakhmetzhan Khamayev
-88 kg	10	Brazil	Evanio Da Silva
-88 kg	10	Poland	Wawrzyniec Latus
-88 kg	10	Uganda	Dennis Mbaziira
-97 kg	9	Jordan	Abdelkareem Khattab
-97 kg	9	China	Ye Jixiong
-97 kg	9	Colombia	Fabio Torres
-97 kg	9	Iran	Seyedhamed Solhipouravanji
-97 kg	9	Malaysia	Nicodemus Manggoi Moses
-97 kg	9	Egypt	Hany Abdelhady
-97 kg	9	Italy	Andrea Quarto
-97 kg	9	Serbia	Petar Milenkovic
-97 kg	9	France	Rafik Arabat
-107 kg	9	Iran	Aliakbar Gharibshahi
-107 kg	9	Mongolia	Sodnompiljee Enkhbayar
-107 kg	9	Brazil	Mateus De Assis Silva
-107 kg	9	Mexico	Jose Castillo Castillo
-107 kg	9	United States	Bobby Body
-107 kg	9	Uzbekistan	Ilkhom Khalimov
-107 kg	9	Malaysia	Yee Khie Jong
-107 kg	9	Jordan	Mutaz Aljuneidi
-107 kg	9	Japan	Kazuhito Sato
+107 kg	9	Iran	Ahmad Aminzadeh
+107 kg	9	Ukraine	Anton Kriukov
+107 kg	9	Georgia	Akaki Jintcharadze
+107 kg	9	Jordan	Jamil Elshebli
+107 kg	9	Iraq	Faris Al-Ageeli
+107 kg	9	Colombia	Eglain Mena
+107 kg	9	Egypt	Amr Mosaad
+107 kg	9	Great Britain	Liam McGarry
+107 kg	9	Ghana	Tahiru Haruna

=== Women ===
Weight category	Slots allocated	NPC	Qualified powerlifter
-41 kg	9	China	Cui Zhe
-41 kg	9	Nigeria	Esther Nworgu
-41 kg	9	Brazil	Lara Aparecida De Lima
-41 kg	9	Ecuador	Kerly Lascano
-41 kg	9	Kenya	Hellen Wawira Kariuki
-41 kg	9	Indonesia	Ni Nengah Widiasih
-41 kg	9	Egypt	Enas Abdelaal Aggag
-41 kg	9	Colombia	Cristina Poblador
-41 kg	9	Portugal	Simone Fragoso
-45 kg	9	China	Guo Lingling
-45 kg	9	Algeria	Samira Guerioua
-45 kg	9	Great Britain	Zoe Newson
-45 kg	9	Turkey	Nazmiye Muratli
-45 kg	9	Morocco	Wafae El Azzab
-45 kg	9	India	Sakina Khatun
-45 kg	9	Kazakhstan	Tursynay Kabyl
-45 kg	9	Poland	Justyna Kozdryk
-45 kg	9	Argentina	Lourdes Maciel
-50 kg	9	China	Xiao Jinping
-50 kg	9	Vietnam	Dang Thi Linh Phuong
-50 kg	9	Nigeria	Bose Bejide
-50 kg	9	Venezuela	Clara Fuentes Monasterio
-50 kg	9	Chile	Camila Campos
-50 kg	9	Brazil	Maria Rizonaide Da Silva
-50 kg	9	Great Britain	Olivia Broome
-50 kg	9	Uzbekistan	Akidakhon Akhtamova
-50 kg	9	Spain	Loida Zabala Ollero
-55 kg	8	Egypt	Rehab Ahmed
-55 kg	8	Great Britain	Charlotte McGuinness
-55 kg	8	Ukraine	Mariana Shevchuk
-55 kg	8	Turkey	Besra Duman
-55 kg	8	Uzbekistan	Durdona Turaeva
-55 kg	8	Italy	Emanuela Romano
-55 kg	8	Thailand	Kamolpan Kraratpet
-55 kg	8	Vietnam	Chau Hoang Tuyet Loan
-61 kg	10	Nigeria	Onyinyechi Mark
-61 kg	10	China	Cui Jianjin
-61 kg	10	Mexico	Amalia Perez Vazquez
-61 kg	10	Poland	Paulina Przywecka-Puziak
-61 kg	10	Uzbekistan	Rukhshona Uktamova
-61 kg	10	Colombia	Ana Lucia Pinto
-61 kg	10	Brazil	Ana Paula Goncalves Marques
-61 kg	10	Armenia	Greta Vardanyan
-61 kg	10	Morocco	Najat El Garraa
-61 kg	10	Cyprus	Maria Markou
-67 kg	9	China	Tan Yujiao
-67 kg	9	Egypt	Fatma Elyan
-67 kg	9	India	Kasthuri Rajamani
-67 kg	9	Nigeria	Lucy Ejike
-67 kg	9	Brazil	Maria Costa De Castro
-67 kg	9	France	Souhad Ghazouani
-67 kg	9	Uzbekistan	Kudratoy Toshpulatova
-67 kg	9	South Korea	Kim Hyeong Hui
-67 kg	9	Colombia	Bertha Fernández
-73 kg	9	Nigeria	Kalifa Almaruf
-73 kg	9	Brazil	Mariana D'Andrea
-73 kg	9	Cameroon	Thamar Gisele Mengue
-73 kg	9	Turkey	Sibel Cam
-73 kg	9	Thailand	Arawan Bootpo
-73 kg	9	Moldova	Larisa Marinenkova
-73 kg	9	Uzbekistan	Ruza Kuzieva
-73 kg	9	South Korea	Jeong Youn Shil
-73 kg	9	Kazakhstan	Raushan Koishibayeva
-79 kg	8	China	Han Miaoyu
-79 kg	8	Nigeria	Bose Omolayo
-79 kg	8	Brazil	Caroline Fernandes Alves
-79 kg	8	Egypt	Safaa Hassan
-79 kg	8	Jordan	Asma Issa
-79 kg	8	Great Britain	Louise Sugden
-79 kg	8	Ireland	Britney Arendse
-79 kg	8	Indonesia	Siti Mahmudah
-86 kg	10	China	Zheng Feifei
-86 kg	10	Nigeria	Loveline Obiji
-86 kg	10	Turkmenistan	Mayagozel Ekeyeva
-86 kg	10	Brazil	Tayana Medeiros
-86 kg	10	Egypt	Randa Mahmoud
-86 kg	10	Jordan	Hamdan Alhajaj
-86 kg	10	Chile	Marion Serrano
-86 kg	10	South Korea	Yang Jaewon
-86 kg	10	Chinese Taipei	Lin Tzu-hui
-86 kg	10	Kyrgyzstan	Mirgul Bolotalieva
+86 kg	10	Nigeria	Folashade Oluwafemiayo
+86 kg	10	Ukraine	Nataliia Oliinyk
+86 kg	10	China	Deng Xuemei
+86 kg	10	Egypt	Nadia Ali
+86 kg	10	Poland	Marzena Zieba
+86 kg	10	Mexico	Perla Barcenas
+86 kg	10	Indonesia	Sriyanti
+86 kg	10	Australia	Hani Watson
+86 kg	10	United States	Ashley Dyce
+86 kg	10	Libya	Ghazalah Alaqouri

== See also ==
- Weightlifting at the 2024 Summer Olympics – Qualification
