= 2025 World Para Powerlifting Championships =

Parasports competition in Cairo, Egypt

11th World Para Powerlifting Championships
- Host city: Cairo
- Country: Egypt
- Sport: Paralympic powerlifting

The 2025 World Para Powerlifting Championships was a powerlifting competition for athletes with a disability. It was held in Cairo, Egypt from 10 to 18 October 2025.

== Medalists ==
=== Seniors Best Lift ===
==== Men ====
Event	Gold		Silver		Bronze	
49 kg	Abdullah Kayapınar; Turkey	179 kg	Omar Qarada; Jordan	178 kg	Marco de Oliveira Cruz; Brazil	177 kg
54 kg	David Degtyarev; Kazakhstan	191 kg	Herbert Aceituno; El Salvador	190 kg	Yang Jinglang; China	186 kg
59 kg	Mohamed Elmenyawy; Egypt	210 kg	Mustafa Radhi; Iraq	203 kg	Qi Yongkai; China	200 kg
65 kg	Zhou Shiwei; China	205 kg	Mohsen Bakhtiar; Iran	201 kg	Hocine Bettir; Algeria	192 kg
72 kg	Bonnie Bunyau Gustin; Malaysia	230 kg	Zhang Pingkang; China	222 kg	Mark Swan; Great Britain	217 kg
80 kg	Gu Xiaofei; China	223 kg	Bekzod Jamilov; Uzbekistan	222 kg	Rasool Mohsin; Iraq	221 kg
88 kg	Yan Panpan; China	244 kg	Rouhollah Rostami; Iran	243 kg	Mohamed Elelfat; Egypt	227 kg
97 kg	Abdelkareem Khattab; Jordan	240 kg	Hany Abdelhady; Egypt	229 kg	Aliasghar Abareghi; Iran	227 kg
107 kg	Aliakbar Gharibshahi; Iran	255 kg	Enkhbayaryn Sodnompiljee; Mongolia	243 kg	Bobby Body; United States	237 kg
+107 kg	Ahmad Aminzadeh; Iran	260 kg	Gustavo Melo de Souza; Brazil	251 kg	Akaki Jintcharadze; Georgia	250 kg

==== Women ====
Event	Gold		Silver		Bronze	
41 kg	Cui Zhe; China	117 kg	Kerly Lascano; Ecuador	110 kg	Lara Aparecida de Lima; Brazil	107 kg
45 kg	Guo Lingling; China	125 kg	Tolulope Ogundolie; Nigeria	112 kg	Nasiba Tashpulatova; Uzbekistan	111 kg
50 kg	Clara Fuentes Monasterio; Venezuela	121 kg	Esther Nworgu; Nigeria	120 kg	Rukayat Ajiboye; Nigeria	116 kg
55 kg	Esther Oyema; Nigeria	125 kg	Besra Duman; Turkey	121 kg	Tamara Podpalnaya; Russia	120 kg
61 kg	Rehab Ahmed; Egypt	131 kg	Ifeoluwa Alake; Nigeria	128 kg	Franca Anigbogu; Nigeria	126 kg
67 kg	Cui Jianjin; China	147 kg	Onyinyechi Mark; Nigeria	137 kg	Fatma Elyan; Egypt	136 kg
73 kg	Tan Yujiao; China	146 kg	Mariana D'Andrea; Brazil	141 kg	Chiamaka Ani; Nigeria	140 kg
79 kg	Rita Ferdinand; Nigeria	153 kg	Han Miaoyu; China	143 kg	Asma Issa; Jordan	136 kg
86 kg	Zheng Feifei; China	153 kg	Tayana Medeiros; Brazil	147 kg	Blessing Ibeh; Nigeria	136 kg
+86 kg	Folashade Oluwafemiayo; Nigeria	168 kg	Zhu Wenjun; China	157 kg	Nihoo Rozbahani; Iran	152 kg

=== Seniors Total Lift ===
==== Men ====
Event	Gold		Silver		Bronze	
49 kg	Marco de Oliveira Cruz; Brazil	515 kg	Vladimir Balynets; Russia	483 kg	Chen Liuxun; China	464 kg
54 kg	David Degtyarev; Kazakhstan	567 kg	Herbert Aceituno; El Salvador	564 kg	Yang Jinglang; China	552 kg
59 kg	Mohamed Elmenyawy; Egypt	621 kg	Juan Garrido Acevedo; Chile	547 kg	Paschalis Kouloumoglou; Greece	541 kg
65 kg	Jorge Carinao; Chile	547 kg	Fouad Elsayed Mohamed; Egypt	530 kg	Marek Trykacz; Poland	501 kg
72 kg	Bonnie Bunyau Gustin; Malaysia	672 kg	Amir Jafari; Iran	581 kg	Carlos Alberto Betancourt; Venezuela	528 kg
80 kg	Gu Xiaofei; China	660 kg	Bekzod Jamilov; Uzbekistan	656 kg	Mahmoud Attia; Egypt	597 kg
88 kg	Mazhar Tammam El Sayed; Egypt	615 kg	Rakhmetzhan Khamayev; Kazakhstan	592 kg	Abdullah Al Kaabi; Iraq	591 kg
97 kg	Hany Abdelhady; Egypt	676 kg	Hayder al-Akdah; Iraq	601 kg	Adilzhan Bautov; Kazakhstan	555 kg
107 kg	Liu Jian; China	675 kg	Elshan Huseynov; Moldova	594 kg	Aleksei Golovan; Russia	571 kg
+107 kg	Gustavo Melo de Souza; Brazil	739 kg	Akaki Jintcharadze; Georgia	737 kg	Konstantin Matsnev; Russia	727 kg

==== Women ====
Event	Gold		Silver		Bronze	
41 kg	Cui Zhe; China	342 kg	Kerly Lascano; Ecuador	318 kg	Anifat Ganiyu; Nigeria	297 kg
45 kg	Guo Lingling; China	368 kg	Tolulope Ogundolie; Nigeria	330 kg	Nasiba Tashpulatova; Uzbekistan	325 kg
50 kg	Fariza Tolzhan; Kazakhstan	285 kg	Oriana del Carmen Teran Velazquez; Venezuela	284 kg	Leidy Rodriguez; Canada	282 kg
55 kg	Esther Oyema; Nigeria	368 kg	Besra Duman; Turkey	354 kg	Nawal Ramadan; Egypt	339 kg
61 kg	Muslima Nuriddinova; Uzbekistan	353 kg	Aml Soliman; Egypt	308 kg	Mishelle Oyague; Ecuador	300 kg
67 kg	Cui Jianjin; China	432 kg	Kudratoy Toshpulatova; Uzbekistan	392 kg	Rukhshona Uktamova; Uzbekistan	363 kg
73 kg	Raushan Koishibayeva; Kazakhstan	330 kg	Thamar Gisele Mengue; Cameroon	321 kg	Nyx Koradi Azuara Gutiérrez; Mexico	310 kg
79 kg	Rita Ferdinand; Nigeria	443 kg	Han Miaoyu; China	419 kg	Asma Issa; Jordan	393 kg
86 kg	Marion Serrano; Chile	397 kg	Naglaa Elshahzy; Egypt	381 kg	Belén Sánchez Domínguez; Mexico	375 kg
+86 kg	Folashade Oluwafemiayo; Nigeria	480 kg	Edilandia Araújo; Brazil	434 kg	Irina Sadovnikova; Russia	404 kg

=== Team events ===
Event	Gold	Silver	Bronze
Men's team	China; Yang Jinglang; Qi Yongkai; Zhang Pingkang	Cuba; Pablo Ramírez Barrientos; Jesús Cuevas Cisneros; Enmanuel González Rodríguez	Iraq; Muslim Al-Sudani; Mustafa Radhi; Rahsool Mohsin
Women's team	Brazil; Mariana D'Andrea; Lara Aparecida de Lima; Tayana Medeiros	Uzbekistan; Akidakhon Akhtamova; Nasiba Tashpulatova; Rukhshona Uktamova	Egypt; Enas Elgebaly Abdelaal; Safaa Hassan; Fatma Elyan
Mixed team	China; Guo Lingling; Yang Jinglang; Gu Xiaofei	Uzbekistan; Khusniddin Usmanov; Muslima Nuriddinova; Bekzod Jamilov	Egypt; Rehab Ahmed; Mohamed Elelfat; Hany Abdelhady

== Medal table ==
=== Seniors ===
* Host nation (Egypt)

Rank	Nation	Gold	Silver	Bronze	Total
1	China (CHN)	13	4	4	21
2	Nigeria (NGR)	6	5	5	16
3	Egypt (EGY)*	5	4	4	13
4	Kazakhstan (KAZ)	4	1	1	6
5	Brazil (BRA)	2	4	2	8
6	Iran (IRI)	2	3	2	7
7	Chile (CHI)	2	1	0	3
8	Malaysia (MAS)	2	0	0	2
9	Uzbekistan (UZB)	1	3	3	7
10	Turkey (TUR)	1	2	0	3
11	Jordan (JOR)	1	1	2	4
12	Venezuela (VEN)	1	1	1	3
13	Iraq (IRQ)	0	2	2	4
14	Ecuador (ECU)	0	2	1	3
15	El Salvador (ESA)	0	2	0	2
16	Russia (RUS)	0	1	5	6
17	Georgia (GEO)	0	1	1	2
18	Cameroon (CMR)	0	1	0	1
18	Moldova (MDA)	0	1	0	1
18	Mongolia (MGL)	0	1	0	1
21	Mexico (MEX)	0	0	2	2
22	Algeria (ALG)	0	0	1	1
22	Cuba (CUB)	0	0	1	1
22	Great Britain (GBR)	0	0	1	1
22	Greece (GRE)	0	0	1	1
22	Poland (POL)	0	0	1	1
22	United States (USA)	0	0	1	1
Totals (27 entries)		40	40	41	121

=== Team events ===
* Host nation (Egypt)

Rank	Nation	Gold	Silver	Bronze	Total
1	China (CHN)	2	0	0	2
2	Brazil (BRA)	1	0	0	1
3	Uzbekistan (UZB)	0	2	0	2
4	Cuba (CUB)	0	1	0	1
5	Egypt (EGY)*	0	0	2	2
6	Iraq (IRQ)	0	0	1	1
Totals (6 entries)		3	3	3	9
