= 2023 World Para Powerlifting Championships =

Parasports competition in Dubai

10th World Para Powerlifting Championships
- Host city: Dubai
- Country: United Arab Emirates
- Athletes: 471
- Sport: Paralympic powerlifting
- Events: 20
- Dates: 22–30 August 2023

The 2023 World Para Powerlifting Championships (WPPO Senior and Junior World Championships) was a powerlifting competition for athletes with a disability. It was held in Dubai, United Arab Emirates from 22 to 30 August.

The tournament was one of the compulsory tournaments to qualify for the 2024 Summer Paralympics in Paris, France.

== Medalists ==
For first time, medals were awarded in total lifts.

=== Seniors Best Lift ===
==== Men ====
| Event | Gold | | Silver | | Bronze | |
|---|---|---|---|---|---|---|
| 49 kg | Lê Văn Công; Vietnam | 176 kg | Omar Qarada; Jordan | 175 kg | Abdullah Kayapınar; Turkey | 173 kg |
| 54 kg | David Degtyarev; Kazakhstan | 180 kg | Yang Jinglang; China | 179 kg | Roland Ezuruike; Nigeria | 178 kg |
| 59 kg | Qi Yongkai; China | 194 kg | Herbert Aceituno; El Salvador | 193 kg | Mohamed Elmenyawy; Egypt | 189 kg |
| 65 kg | Zou Yi; China | 215 kg | Amir Jafari Arangeh; Iran | 202 kg | Thomas Kure; Nigeria | 200 kg |
| 72 kg | Bonnie Bunyau Gustin; Malaysia | 231 kg | Donato Telesca; Italy | 202 kg | Bekzod Jamilov; Uzbekistan | 200 kg |
| 80 kg | Roohallah Rostami; Iran | 232 kg | Gu Xiaofei; China | 231 kg | Rasool Mohsin; Iraq | 226 kg |
| 88 kg | Abdelkareem Khattab; Jordan | 251 kg | Ye Jixiong; China | 234 kg | Mohamed Elelfat; Egypt | 222 kg |
| 97 kg | Yan Panpan; China | 233 kg | Farhod Umirzakov; Uzbekistan | 232 kg | Hamed Solhipour; Iran | 226 kg |
| 107 kg | Aliakbar Gharibshahi; Iran | 248 kg | Enkhbayaryn Sodnompiljee; Mongolia | 247 kg | Anton Kriukov; Ukraine | 244 kg |
| +107 kg | Ahmad Aminzadeh; Iran | 255 kg | Mahdi Sayadi; Iran | 246 kg | Jamil Elshebli; Jordan | 237 kg |

==== Women ====
| Event | Gold | | Silver | | Bronze | |
|---|---|---|---|---|---|---|
| 41 kg | Cui Zhe; China | 112 kg | Esther Mworgu; Nigeria | 111 kg | Lara Aparecida de Lima; Brazil | 98 kg |
| 45 kg | Guo Lingling; China | 120 kg | Clara Fuentes; Venezuela | 105 kg | Nazmiye Muratlı; Turkey | 104 kg |
| 50 kg | Olivia Broome; Great Britain | 112 kg | Wei Yi; China | 105 kg | Đặng Thị Linh Phượng; Vietnam | 103kg |
| 55 kg | Rehab Ahmed; Egypt | 130 kg | Mariana Shevchuk; Ukraine | 126 kg | Xiao Jinping; China | 125 kg |
| 61 kg | Onyinyechi Mark; Nigeria | 130 kg | Fatma Korany; Egypt | 126 kg | Cui Jianjin; China | 125 kg |
| 67 kg | Tan Yujiao; China | 134 kg | Liao Liye; China | 133 kg | Bertha Fernández; Colombia | 129 kg |
| 73 kg | Kafila Almaruf; Nigeria | 151 kg | Xu Lili; China | 134 kg | Souhad Ghazouani; France | 131 kg |
| 79 kg | Mariana D'Andrea; Brazil | 151 kg | Bose Omolayo; Nigeria | 150 kg | Miaoyu Han; China | 140 kg |
| 86 kg | Zheng Feifei; China | 158 kg | Nataliia Oliinyk; Ukraine | 153 kg | Folashade Oluwafemiayo; Nigeria | 152 kg |
| +86 kg | Deng Xuemei; China | 150 kg | Nadia Ali; Egypt | 144 kg | Marzena Zięba; Poland | 137 kg |

=== Seniors Total Lift ===
==== Men ====
| Event | Gold | | Silver | | Bronze | |
|---|---|---|---|---|---|---|
| 49 kg | Parmjeet Kumar; India | 462 kg | Jhonny Morales; Colombia | 444 kg | Hadj Ahmed Beyour; Algeria | 437 kg |
| 54 kg | Yang Jinglang; China | 528 kg | Roland Ezuruike; Nigeria | 516 kg | Taha Abdelmajid; Egypt | 492 kg |
| 59 kg | Qi Yongkai; China | 577 kg | Herbert Aceituno; El Salvador | 573 kg | Mohamed Elmenyawy; Egypt | 557 kg |
| 65 kg | Zou Yi; China | 633 kg | Ali Seifi; Iran | 544 kg | Esen Kaliev; Kyrgyzstan | 466 kg |
| 72 kg | Bonnie Bunyau Gustin; Malaysia | 661 kg | Donato Telesca; Italy | 600 kg | Uğur Yumuk; Turkey | 566 kg |
| 80 kg | Roohallah Rostami; Iran | 686 kg | Gu Xiaofei; China | 680 kg | Rasool Mohsin; Iraq | 654 kg |
| 88 kg | Abdelkareem Khattab; Jordan | 722 kg | Ye Jixiong; China | 684 kg | Huver Mondragón; Colombia | 569 kg |
| 97 kg | Yan Panpan; China | 689 kg | Farhod Umirzakov; Uzbekistan | 680 kg | Fabio Torres; Colombia | 664 kg |
| 107 kg | Anton Kriukov; Ukraine | 711 kg | Jong Yee Khie; Malaysia | 631 kg | Saman Razi; Iran | 455 kg |
| +107 kg | Liam McGarry; United Kingdom | 681 kg | Ahmed Khamis Alblooshi; United Arab Emirates | 644 kg | Anastasios Baos; Greece | 593 kg |

==== Women ====
| Event | Gold | | Silver | | Bronze | |
|---|---|---|---|---|---|---|
| 41 kg | Cui Zhe; China | 327 kg | Maryna Kopiika; Ukraine | 268 kg | Noura Baddour; Syria | 248 kg |
| 45 kg | Guo Lingling; China | 354 kg | Clara Fuentes; Venezuela | 306 kg | Lourdes Maciel; Argentina | 230 kg |
| 50 kg | Olivia Broome; Great Britain | 329 kg | Đặng Thị Linh Phượng; Vietnam | 302 kg | Omaima Omar; Egypt | 292 kg |
| 55 kg | Mariana Shevchuk; Ukraine | 361 kg | Camila Campos; Chile | 339 kg | Muslima Nuriddinova; Uzbekistan | 307 kg |
| 61 kg | Onyinyechi Mark; Nigeria | 419 kg | Najat El Garraa; Morocco | 340 kg | Ana Paula Gonçalves; Brazil | 291 kg |
| 67 kg | Tan Yujiao; China | 394 kg | Kudratoy Toshpulatova; Uzbekistan | 352 kg | Kim Hyeong-hui; South Korea | 315 kg |
| 73 kg | Kafila Almaruf; Nigeria | 411 kg | Raushan Koishibayeva; Kazakhstan | 317 kg | Xu Lili; China | 264 kg |
| 79 kg | Mariana D'Andrea; Brazil | 438 kg | Bose Omolayo; Nigeria | 435 kg | Miaoyu Han; China | 405 kg |
| 86 kg | Zheng Feifei; China | 452 kg | Nataliia Oliinyk; Ukraine | 447 kg | Randa Mahmoud; Egypt | 376 kg |
| +86 kg | Marzena Zięba; Poland | 392 kg | Choe Sun-jeong; South Korea | 324 kg | Deng Xuemei; China | 296 kg |

=== Team Events ===
- Men: 16 teams from 13 nations

Group A CHN · UKR · CHI 1

Group B IRQ · LBA · KSA 1

Group C FRA · CUB · UZB · KSA 2

Group D COL 1 · COL 2 · CHI 2 · AUS

- Women: 11 teams from 10 nations

Group A UKR · MEX 2 · LBA · CHI - UZB

Group B BRA · CHN · THA · COL · MEX 1

- Mixed: 21 teams from 18 nations

Group A IRQ · COL 2 · AZE · AUS · CHI 1 · JOR

Group B ESP · MEX · LBA · TKM · THA · CIV

Group C FRA · UZB 2 · CUB · GBR · KOR

Group D COL 1 UKR · CHI 2 · CHN · UZB 1 · KAZ

== Medal table ==
Rookie / Next Gen

Elite (One Bronze of United Kingdom replaced by Turkey)

Legend

=== Seniors (Best Lift) ===
| Rank | Nation | Gold | Silver | Bronze | Total |
|---|---|---|---|---|---|
| 1 | China (CHN) | 8 | 6 | 3 | 17 |
| 2 | Iran (IRI) | 3 | 2 | 1 | 6 |
| 3 | Nigeria (NGR) | 2 | 2 | 3 | 7 |
| 4 | Egypt (EGY) | 1 | 2 | 2 | 5 |
| 5 | Jordan (JOR) | 1 | 1 | 1 | 3 |
| 6 | Brazil (BRA) | 1 | 0 | 1 | 2 |
| 6 | Vietnam (VIE) | 1 | 0 | 1 | 2 |
| 8 | Great Britain (GBR) | 1 | 0 | 0 | 1 |
| 8 | Kazakhstan (KAZ) | 1 | 0 | 0 | 1 |
| 8 | Malaysia (MAS) | 1 | 0 | 0 | 1 |
| 11 | Ukraine (UKR) | 0 | 2 | 1 | 3 |
| 12 | Uzbekistan (UZB) | 0 | 1 | 1 | 2 |
| 13 | El Salvador (ESA) | 0 | 1 | 0 | 1 |
| 13 | Italy (ITA) | 0 | 1 | 0 | 1 |
| 13 | Mongolia (MGL) | 0 | 1 | 0 | 1 |
| 13 | Venezuela (VEN) | 0 | 1 | 0 | 1 |
| 17 | Turkey (TUR) | 0 | 0 | 2 | 2 |
| 18 | Colombia (COL) | 0 | 0 | 1 | 1 |
| 18 | France (FRA) | 0 | 0 | 1 | 1 |
| 18 | Iraq (IRQ) | 0 | 0 | 1 | 1 |
| 18 | Poland (POL) | 0 | 0 | 1 | 1 |
| Totals (21 entries) | | 20 | 20 | 20 | 60 |

=== Seniors (Total Lift) ===
| Rank | Nation | Gold | Silver | Bronze | Total |
|---|---|---|---|---|---|
| 1 | China (CHN) | 8 | 2 | 3 | 13 |
| 2 | Nigeria (NGR) | 2 | 2 | 0 | 4 |
| 2 | Ukraine (UKR) | 2 | 2 | 0 | 4 |
| 4 | Great Britain (GBR) | 2 | 0 | 0 | 2 |
| 5 | Iran (IRI) | 1 | 1 | 1 | 3 |
| 6 | Malaysia (MAS) | 1 | 1 | 0 | 2 |
| 7 | Brazil (BRA) | 1 | 0 | 1 | 2 |
| 8 | India (IND) | 1 | 0 | 0 | 1 |
| 8 | Jordan (JOR) | 1 | 0 | 0 | 1 |
| 8 | Poland (POL) | 1 | 0 | 0 | 1 |
| 11 | Uzbekistan (UZB) | 0 | 2 | 1 | 3 |
| 12 | Colombia (COL) | 0 | 1 | 2 | 3 |
| 13 | South Korea (KOR) | 0 | 1 | 1 | 2 |
| 14 | Chile (CHI) | 0 | 1 | 0 | 1 |
| 14 | El Salvador (ESA) | 0 | 1 | 0 | 1 |
| 14 | Italy (ITA) | 0 | 1 | 0 | 1 |
| 14 | Kazakhstan (KAZ) | 0 | 1 | 0 | 1 |
| 14 | Morocco (MAR) | 0 | 1 | 0 | 1 |
| 14 | United Arab Emirates (UAE) | 0 | 1 | 0 | 1 |
| 14 | Venezuela (VEN) | 0 | 1 | 0 | 1 |
| 14 | Vietnam (VIE) | 0 | 1 | 0 | 1 |
| 22 | Egypt (EGY) | 0 | 0 | 4 | 4 |
| 23 | Algeria (ALG) | 0 | 0 | 1 | 1 |
| 23 | Argentina (ARG) | 0 | 0 | 1 | 1 |
| 23 | Greece (GRE) | 0 | 0 | 1 | 1 |
| 23 | Iraq (IRQ) | 0 | 0 | 1 | 1 |
| 23 | Kyrgyzstan (KGZ) | 0 | 0 | 1 | 1 |
| 23 | Syria (SYR) | 0 | 0 | 1 | 1 |
| 23 | Turkey (TUR) | 0 | 0 | 1 | 1 |
| Totals (29 entries) | | 20 | 20 | 20 | 60 |

=== Seniors (Overall = Best + Total) ===
| Rank | Nation | Gold | Silver | Bronze | Total |
|---|---|---|---|---|---|
| 1 | China (CHN) | 16 | 8 | 6 | 30 |
| 2 | Nigeria (NGR) | 4 | 4 | 3 | 11 |
| 3 | Iran (IRI) | 4 | 3 | 2 | 9 |
| 4 | Great Britain (GBR) | 3 | 0 | 0 | 3 |
| 5 | Ukraine (UKR) | 2 | 4 | 1 | 7 |
| 6 | Jordan (JOR) | 2 | 1 | 1 | 4 |
| 7 | Malaysia (MAS) | 2 | 1 | 0 | 3 |
| 8 | Brazil (BRA) | 2 | 0 | 2 | 4 |
| 9 | Egypt (EGY) | 1 | 2 | 6 | 9 |
| 10 | Vietnam (VIE) | 1 | 1 | 1 | 3 |
| 11 | Kazakhstan (KAZ) | 1 | 1 | 0 | 2 |
| 12 | Poland (POL) | 1 | 0 | 1 | 2 |
| 13 | India (IND) | 1 | 0 | 0 | 1 |
| 14 | Uzbekistan (UZB) | 0 | 3 | 2 | 5 |
| 15 | El Salvador (ESA) | 0 | 2 | 0 | 2 |
| 15 | Italy (ITA) | 0 | 2 | 0 | 2 |
| 15 | Venezuela (VEN) | 0 | 2 | 0 | 2 |
| 18 | Colombia (COL) | 0 | 1 | 3 | 4 |
| 19 | South Korea (KOR) | 0 | 1 | 1 | 2 |
| 20 | Chile (CHI) | 0 | 1 | 0 | 1 |
| 20 | Mongolia (MGL) | 0 | 1 | 0 | 1 |
| 20 | Morocco (MAR) | 0 | 1 | 0 | 1 |
| 20 | United Arab Emirates (UAE) | 0 | 1 | 0 | 1 |
| 24 | Turkey (TUR) | 0 | 0 | 3 | 3 |
| 25 | Iraq (IRQ) | 0 | 0 | 2 | 2 |
| 26 | Algeria (ALG) | 0 | 0 | 1 | 1 |
| 26 | Argentina (ARG) | 0 | 0 | 1 | 1 |
| 26 | France (FRA) | 0 | 0 | 1 | 1 |
| 26 | Greece (GRE) | 0 | 0 | 1 | 1 |
| 26 | Kyrgyzstan (KGZ) | 0 | 0 | 1 | 1 |
| 26 | Syria (SYR) | 0 | 0 | 1 | 1 |
| Totals (31 entries) | | 40 | 40 | 40 | 120 |

=== Team Events ===
Source:

=== Rookie (14-17) (Best) ===
| Rank | Nation | Gold | Silver | Bronze | Total |
|---|---|---|---|---|---|
| 1 | Kazakhstan (KAZ) | 3 | 0 | 1 | 4 |
| 2 | Uzbekistan (UZB) | 2 | 0 | 0 | 2 |
| 3 | Azerbaijan (AZE) | 1 | 0 | 0 | 1 |
| 3 | Libya (LBA) | 1 | 0 | 0 | 1 |
| 3 | Tajikistan (TJK) | 1 | 0 | 0 | 1 |
| 6 | Armenia (ARM) | 0 | 1 | 0 | 1 |
| 6 | United Arab Emirates (UAE) | 0 | 1 | 0 | 1 |
| Totals (7 entries) | | 8 | 2 | 1 | 11 |

=== Next Gen (18-20) (Best) ===
| Rank | Nation | Gold | Silver | Bronze | Total |
|---|---|---|---|---|---|
| 1 | Ukraine (UKR) | 3 | 0 | 1 | 4 |
| 2 | Uzbekistan (UZB) | 2 | 1 | 2 | 5 |
| 3 | Egypt (EGY) | 2 | 1 | 1 | 4 |
| 4 | Azerbaijan (AZE) | 2 | 1 | 0 | 3 |
| 5 | India (IND) | 1 | 1 | 0 | 2 |
| 5 | Ireland (IRL) | 1 | 1 | 0 | 2 |
| 7 | Brazil (BRA) | 1 | 0 | 0 | 1 |
| 7 | France (FRA) | 1 | 0 | 0 | 1 |
| 7 | Georgia (GEO) | 1 | 0 | 0 | 1 |
| 7 | Hungary (HUN) | 1 | 0 | 0 | 1 |
| 7 | Poland (POL) | 1 | 0 | 0 | 1 |
| 7 | Saudi Arabia (KSA) | 1 | 0 | 0 | 1 |
| 13 | Kazakhstan (KAZ) | 0 | 1 | 2 | 3 |
| 14 | Chile (CHI) | 0 | 1 | 0 | 1 |
| 14 | Ecuador (ECU) | 0 | 1 | 0 | 1 |
| 14 | Japan (JPN) | 0 | 1 | 0 | 1 |
| 14 | Mexico (MEX) | 0 | 1 | 0 | 1 |
| 18 | Kyrgyzstan (KGZ) | 0 | 0 | 1 | 1 |
| Totals (18 entries) | | 17 | 10 | 7 | 34 |

== Participating nations ==
Because of the 2022 Russian invasion of Ukraine, lifters from Russia and Belarus were banned.

=== Seniors and Legends ===
471 from 78 nations:

STATISTICS by BW Categories

BW Cat. Total

Men's Up to 49 kg 34

Men's Up to 54 kg 29

Men's Up to 59 kg 26

Men's Up to 65 kg 26

Men's Up to 72 kg 36

Men's Up to 80 kg 28

Men's Up to 88 kg 27

Men's Up to 97 kg 20

Men's Up to 107 kg 24

Men's Over 107 kg 21

Women's Up to 41 kg 16

Women's Up to 45 kg 18

Women's Up to 50 kg 20

Women's Up to 55 kg 30

Women's Up to 61 kg 23

Women's Up to 67 kg 16

Women's Up to 73 kg 24

Women's Up to 79 kg 15

Women's Up to 86 kg 19

Women's Over 86 kg 19

Number of athletes 471

1. Afghanistan (2)
2. Algeria (6)
3. Angola (2)
4. Argentina (5)
5. Armenia (7)
6. Australia (5)
7. Azerbaijan (6)
8. Bangladesh (1)
9. Brazil (23)
10. Bulgaria (1)
11. China (19)
12. Chile (8)
13. Ivory Coast (4)
14. Cameroon (4)
15. Colombia (12)
16. Cuba (5)
17. Cyprus (2)
18. Dominican Republic (2)
19. Egypt (15)
20. El Salvador (1)
21. Spain (3)
22. Finland (1)
23. France (5)
24. Gambia (2)
25. United Kingdom (11)
26. Georgia (5)
27. Germany (18)
28. Greece (5)
29. Hungary (6)
30. India (20)
31. Iran (11)
32. Iraq (8)
33. Ireland (7)
34. Italy (4)
35. Jordan (9)
36. Japan (18)
37. Kazakhstan (18)
38. Kenya (9)
39. Kyrgyzstan (5)
40. South Korea (15)
41. Saudi Arabia (5)
42. Libya (6)
43. Morocco (5)
44. Malaysia (5)
45. Moldova (3)
46. Mexico (14)
47. Mongolia (1)
48. Nepal (2)
49. Nigeria (11)
50. New Zealand (1)
51. Panama (3)
52. Peru (2)
53. Philippines (6)
54. Poland (11)
55. Serbia (1)
56. Slovakia (1)
57. Syria (3)
58. Thailand (5)
59. Tajikistan (1)
60. Turkmenistan (10)
61. Turkey (9)
62. United Arab Emirates (15)
63. Uganda (3)
64. Ukraine (10)
65. United States (5)
66. Uzbekistan (19)
67. Vietnam (4)
68. Yemen (2)
69. Zambia (1)
70. Brunei (1)
71. Canada (1)
72. Estonia (1)
73. Israel (1)
74. Laos (1)
75. Portugal (1)
76. Singapore (1)
77. Chinese Taipei (1)
78. Venezuela (2)

=== Juniors (Rookie & Next Gen) ===
58 from 27 nations:

1. Algeria (1)
2. Argentina (1)
3. Armenia (2)
4. Azerbaijan (4)
5. Chile (1)
6. Egypt (4)
7. France (1)
8. United Kingdom (1)
9. Hungary (1)
10. India (2)
11. Ireland (3)
12. Italy (1)
13. Japan (1)
14. Kazakhstan (8)
15. Kyrgyzstan (2)
16. Saudi Arabia (2)
17. Libya (2)
18. Moldova (1)
19. Mexico (1)
20. Poland (1)
21. Tajikistan (2)
22. United Arab Emirates (2)
23. Ukraine (4)
24. Uzbekistan (7)
25. Brazil (1)
26. Ecuador (1)
27. Georgia (1)
