= World and Paralympic records set at the 2024 Summer Paralympics =

Records set in the 2024 Paris Paralympics

The 2024 Summer Paralympics was an international parasports event held in Paris, France from 28 August to 8 September 2024. The event featured around 4400 athletes across 22 different sports. In total, 80 World records and 120 Paralympic records have been broken in the event.

== Key ==
- † Denotes that the record had been broken in a later round of the event.

== Archery ==
Event	Class	Date	Round	Athlete(s)	Nation	Score	Record	Ref
Mixed team	W1	2 September	Final	Chen Minyi and Zhang Tianxin	China	147	PR	

== Athletics ==
More than 40 World Records in athletics had been set in the 2024 Summer Paralympics.

=== Track events ===
Event	Class	Date	Round	Athlete(s)	Nation	Time or distance	Record	Ref
Men's 100 metres	T64	1 September	Heat	Maxcel Amo Manu	Italy	10.69†	PR	
Men's 100 metres	T64	2 September	Final	Sherman Guity	Costa Rica	10.65	PR	
Men's 100 metres	T38	31 August	Final	Jaydin Blackwell	United States	10.64	WR	
Men's 1500 metres	T12	3 September	Final	Aleksandr Kostin	Neutral Paralympic Athletes	3:44.43	PR	
Men's 1500 metres	T11	3 September	Final	Yeltsin Jacques	Brazil	3:55.82	WR	
Men's 1500 metres	T20	6 September	Final	Ben Sandilands	Great Britain	3:45.40	WR	
Men's 5000 metres	T11	30 August	Final	Júlio Cesar Agripino	Brazil	14:48.85	WR	
Women's 100 metres	T38	31 August	Final	Karen Palomeque	Colombia	12.26	WR	
Women's 400 metres	T11	31 August	Final	Lahja Ishitile	Namibia	56.20	PR	
Women's 5000 metres	T54	31 August	Final	Catherine Debrunner	Switzerland	10:43.62	PR	

=== Field events ===
Event	Class	Date	Round	Athlete(s)	Nation	Time or distance	Record	Ref
Women's shot put	F20	1 September	Final	Sabrina Fortune	Great Britain	15.12m	WR	
Women's discus throw	F53	2 September	Final	Elizabeth Rodrigues	Brazil	17.37m	PR	
Women's discus throw	F38	6 September	Final	Simoné Kruger	South Africa	38.70m	PR	
Men's javelin	F13	6 September	Final	Dan Pembroke	Great Britain	74.49m	WR	
Men's javelin	F41	7 September	Final	Navdeep Singh	India	47.32m (Note: Iranian Sadegh Beit Sayah originally set the Paralympic Record with 47.64m. However, he was later disqualified by breaching IPC's Code of Conduct and Ethics.)	PR	
Men's high jump	T63	5 September	Final	Ezra Frech	United States	1.94m	PR	
Men's long jump	T11	30 August	Final	Di Dongdong	China	6.85m	WR	
Men's long jump	T63	31 August	Final	Joel de Jong	Netherlands	7.68m	WR	
Women's long jump	T61	5 September	Final	Vanessa Low	Australia	5.45m	WR	
Women's long jump	T64	31 August	Final	Fleur Jong	Netherlands	6.53m	WR	

=== Road events ===
Event	Class	Date	Round	Athlete(s)	Nation	Time or distance	Record	Ref
Women's marathon	T12	8 September	Final	Fatima Ezzahra El Idrissi	Morocco	2:48:36	WR	

== Canoeing ==
Event	Class	Date	Round	Athlete(s)	Nation	Time	Record	Ref
Women's single 200m	VL3	7 September	Final	Charlotte Henshaw	Great Britain	49.07	PR	

== Cycling ==
Event	Class	Date	Round	Athlete(s)	Nation	Time	Record	Ref
Women's 500m individual pursuit	C5	29 August	Trial	Caroline Groot	Netherlands	35.390	WR	
Men's 3000m individual pursuit	C1	29 August	Trial	Li Zhangyu	China	3:31.338	WR	
Women's 3000m individual pursuit	C3	29 August	Trial	Wang Xiaomei	China	3:44.660	WR	
Women's 3000m individual pursuit	C2	29 August	Trial	Daphne Schrager	Great Britain	3:45.133	WR	
Women's 3000m individual pursuit	C1	29 August	Trial	Qian Wangwei	China	4:17.814	PR	
Men's 4000m individual pursuit	B	29 August	Trial	Tristan Bangma (Pilot: Patrick Bos)	Netherlands	3:55.396	WR	

== Powerlifting ==
Event	Date	Round	Athlete(s)	Nation	Weight	Record	Ref
Women's 45 kg	4 September	Final	Guo Lingling	China	123 kg	WR	
Women's 50 kg	5 September	Final	Clara Fuentes Monasterio	Venezuela	124 kg	PR	
Women's 61 kg	6 September	Final	Onyinyechi Mark	Nigeria	142 kg	WR	
Women's 67 kg	6 September	Final	Tan Yujiao	China	142 kg	WR	
Women's 79 kg	7 September	Final	Han Miaoyu	China	154 kg	WR	
Women's 86 kg+	8 September	Final	Folashade Oluwafemiayo	Nigeria	167 kg	WR	
Men's 72 kg	6 September	Final	Bonnie Bunyau Gustin	Malaysia	232 kg	WR	
Men's 80 kg	6 September	Final	Roohallah Rostami	Iran	242 kg	WR	
Men's 97 kg	7 September	Final	Abdelkareem Mohmmad Ahmad Khattab	Jordan	270 kg	WR	
Men's 107 kg	8 September	Final	Aliakbar Gharibshahi	Iran	252 kg	PR	

== Swimming ==
More than 30 records in swimming had been set in the event.

Event	Class	Date	Round	Athlete(s)	Nation	Time	Record	Ref
Mixed 4 × 50m freestyle relay	20 Points	30 August	Final	Peng Qiuping, Yuan Weiyi, Jiang Yuyan, Guo Jincheng	China	2:15.49	WR	
Women's 100m backstroke	S8	1 September	Final	Alice Tai	Great Britain	1:09.06	PR	
Women's 100m butterfly	S14	29 August	Final	Poppy Maskill	Great Britain	1:03.00	WR	
Women's 100m freestyle	S3	3 September	Final	Leanne Smith	United States	1:28.81	PR	
Men's 200m freestyle	S14	31 August	Final	William Ellard	Great Britain	1:51.30	WR	

== See also ==
- World and Paralympic records set at the 2016 Summer Paralympics
- World and Olympic records set at the 2024 Summer Olympics
