= 2019 World Para Powerlifting Championships =

Parasports competition in Astana, Kazakhstan

8th World Para Powerlifting Championships
- Host city: Nur-Sultan, Kazakhstan
- Athletes: 430
- Events: 20
- Dates: 12–20 July 2019

The 2019 World Para Powerlifting Championships was a competition for male and female athletes with a disability. It was held in Nur-Sultan, Kazakhstan and ran from 12 to 20 July.

The tournament was one of the compulsory tournaments to qualify for the 2020 Summer Paralympics held in Tokyo, Japan.

== Medal table ==
* Host nation (Kazakhstan)

Rank	NPC	Gold	Silver	Bronze	Total
1	China (CHN)	7	8	1	16
2	Nigeria (NGR)	3	3	2	8
3	Iran (IRI)	3	3	1	7
4	Egypt (EGY)	3	1	4	8
5	Russia (RUS)	2	0	2	4
6	Ukraine (UKR)	1	0	3	4
7	Malaysia (MAS)	1	0	0	1
7	Mongolia (MGL)	1	0	0	1
9	Turkey (TUR)	0	2	0	2
10	Jordan (JOR)	0	1	1	2
11	Algeria (ALG)	0	1	0	1
11	Brazil (BRA)	0	1	0	1
11	Uzbekistan (UZB)	0	1	0	1
14	Chile (CHI)	0	0	1	1
14	Colombia (COL)	0	0	1	1
14	Greece (GRE)	0	0	1	1
14	Indonesia (INA)	0	0	1	1
14	Iraq (IRQ)	0	0	1	1
14	Mexico (MEX)	0	0	1	1
14	Syria (SYR)	0	0	1	1
Totals (20 entries)		21	21	21	63

== Medalists ==
=== Men ===
Event	Gold	Silver	Bronze
49 kg	Vladimir Balynets; Russia	Omar Qarada; Jordan	Zheng Yu; China
54 kg	Vladimir Krivulya; Russia	Roland Ezuruike; Nigeria	Dimitrios Bakochristos; Greece
59 kg	Sherif Osman; Egypt	Qi Yongkai; China	Juan Carlos Garrido; Chile
65 kg	Bonnie Bunyau Gustin; Malaysia	Hocine Bettir; Algeria	Amir Jafari; Iran
72 kg	Hu Peng; China	Nader Moradi; Iran	Nnamdi Innocent; Nigeria
80 kg	Rouhollah Rostami; Iran	Gu Xiaofei; China	Mohamed Elelfat; Egypt
88 kg	Ye Jixiong; China	Hany Abdelhady; Egypt	Abdelkareem Khattab; Jordan
97 kg	Hamed Solhipour; Iran	Yan Panpan; China	Fabio Torres; Colombia
107 kg	Sodnompiljee Enkhbayar; Mongolia	Aliakbar Gharibshi; Iran	Jose De Jesus Castillo; Mexico
+107 kg	Siamand Rahman; Iran	Mansour Pourmirzaei; Iran	Faris Al-Ageeli; Iraq

=== Women ===
Event	Gold	Silver	Bronze
41 kg	Cui Zhe; China	Li Jinyun; China	Noura Baddour; Syria
45 kg	Guo Lingling; China	Nazmiye Muratli; Turkey	Latifat Tijani; Nigeria
50 kg	Rehab Ahmed; Egypt	Hu Dandan; China	Lidiia Soloviova; Ukraine
55 kg	Mariana Shevchuk; Ukraine	Xiao Cuijuan; China	Tamara Podpalnaya; Russia
61 kg	Lucy Ejike; Nigeria	Ruza Kuzieva; Uzbekistan	Rayisa Toporkova; Ukraine
67 kg	Tan Yujiao; China	Olaitan Ibrahim; Nigeria	Fatma Omar; Egypt
73 kg	Han Miaoyu; China	Sibel Çam; Turkey	Amal Mahmoud; Egypt
79 kg	Bose Omolayo; Nigeria	Xu Lili; China	Siti Mahmudah; Indonesia
86 kg	Folashade Oluwafemiayo; Nigeria	Zheng Feifei; China	Vera Muratova; Russia
+86 kg	Deng Xuemei; China	Loveline Obiji; Nigeria	Randa Mahmoud; Egypt

=== Mixed ===
Event	Gold	Silver	Bronze
Mixed team	Egypt; Sherif Osman; Rehab Ahmed; Mohamed Elelfat	Brazil; Bruno Carra; Mariana D'Andrea; Evânio da Silva	Ukraine; Kostiantyn Panasiuk; Lidiia Soloviova; Yurii Babynets

== Results ==
=== Men ===
==== 49 kg ====
Rank	Athlete	Nation	Body weight (kg)	Result (kg)			
Rank	Athlete	Nation	Body weight (kg)	1	2	3	Result
1st place, gold medalist(s)	Vladimir Balynets	Russia	48.95	160	167	173	173 ER
2nd place, silver medalist(s)	Omar Qarada	Jordan	47.48	170	172	~~176~~	172
3rd place, bronze medalist(s)	Zheng Yu	China	48.85	~~170~~	172	~~176~~	172
4	Lê Văn Công	Vietnam	47.39	~~160~~	165	~~172~~	165
5	David Degtyarev	Kazakhstan	48.74	~~162~~	162	~~173~~	162
6	Parvin Mammadov	Azerbaijan	48.61	142	150	~~156~~	150
7	Abdullah Kayapinar	Turkey	42.36	149	~~154~~	~~155~~	149
-	Patrick Ardon	France	48.84	~~136~~	~~143~~	~~143~~	NM

==== 54 Kg ====
Rank	Athlete	Nation	Body weight	Result (kg)			
Rank	Athlete	Nation	Body weight	1	2	3	Result
1st place, gold medalist(s)	Vladimir Krivulya	Russia	53.69	183	189	~~195~~	189 ER
2nd place, silver medalist(s)	Roland Ezuruike	Nigeria	52.90	177	~~185~~	~~189~~	177
3rd place, bronze medalist(s)	Dimitrios Bakochristos	Greece	53.17	163	165	~~170~~	165
4	Taha Abdelmajid	Egypt	52.86	160	164	~~170~~	164
5	Iurii Egorchenkov	Russia	53.39	155	161	~~166~~	161
6	Axel Bourlon	France	53.34	150	~~156~~	~~156~~	150
-	Nguyễn Bình An	Vietnam	53.69	~~175~~	~~177~~	~~178~~	NM
-	Wang Jian	China	54.00	~~173~~	~~173~~	~~173~~	NM

==== 59 Kg ====
Rank	Athlete	Nation	Body weight	Result (kg)			
Rank	Athlete	Nation	Body weight	1	2	3	Result
1st place, gold medalist(s)	Sherif Osman	Egypt	58.64	190	195	196	196
2nd place, silver medalist(s)	Qi Yongkai	China	57.96	187	190	195	195 AR
3rd place, bronze medalist(s)	Juan Carlos Garrido	Chile	58.10	180	184	~~187~~	184
4	Ildar Bedderdinov	Russia	57.75	178	183	~~187~~	183
5	Bruno Carra	Brazil	57.55	~~175~~	175	~~184~~	175
6	Seyed Yousefi Pashaki	Iran	58.87	170	~~178~~	~~179~~	170
-	Jorge Carinao	Chile	57.46	~~170~~	~~170~~	~~170~~	NM
-	Yang Jinglang	China	58.29	~~183~~	~~183~~	~~185~~	NM

==== 65 Kg ====
Rank	Athlete	Nation	Body weight	Result (kg)			
Rank	Athlete	Nation	Body weight	1	2	3	Result
1st place, gold medalist(s)	Bonnie Bunyau Gustin	Malaysia	63.50	185	197	207	207
2nd place, silver medalist(s)	Hocine Bettir	Algeria	63.32	191	194	~~200~~	194
3rd place, bronze medalist(s)	Amir Jafari	Iran	64.87	~~193~~	193	~~201~~	193
4	Liu Lei	China	64.71	~~190~~	190	~~208~~	190
5	Mohammad Tarbash	Jordan	64.14	~~182~~	182	~~193~~	182
6	Herbert Aceituno	El Salvador	63.60	~~179~~	179	~~182~~	179
-	Grzegorz Lanzer	Poland	62.09	~~179~~	~~179~~	~~179~~	NM
-	Paul Kehinde	Nigeria	64.28	~~194~~	~~195~~	~~195~~	NM

==== 72 Kg ====
Rank	Athlete	Nation	Body weight	Result (kg)			
Rank	Athlete	Nation	Body weight	1	2	3	Result
1st place, gold medalist(s)	Hu Peng	China	71.53	209	~~212~~	~~215~~	209
2nd place, silver medalist(s)	Nader Moradi	Iran	71.18	~~202~~	202	~~210~~	202
3rd place, bronze medalist(s)	Nnamdi Innocent	Nigeria	70.71	190	~~200~~	~~202~~	190
4	Metwaly Mathna	Egypt	71.93	182	~~191~~	~~191~~	182
5	Mahmoud Attia	Egypt	68.85	176	181	~~191~~	181
6	Donato Telesca	Italy	71.66	181	~~183~~	~~183~~	181
7	Sergey Meladze	Turkmenistan	71.38	180	~~185~~	~~185~~	180
8	Nathaniel Wilding	United Kingdom	71.94	~~176~~	~~176~~	RET	NM
9	Jaideep Jaideep	India	71.99	~~182~~	RET		NM

==== 80 Kg ====
Rank	Athlete	Nation	Body weight	Result (kg)			
Rank	Athlete	Nation	Body weight	1	2	3	Result
1st place, gold medalist(s)	Rouhollah Rostami	Iran	79.40	215	225	236	236
2nd place, silver medalist(s)	Gu Xiaofei	China	78.62	221	227	~~236~~	227
3rd place, bronze medalist(s)	Mohamed Elelfat	Egypt	79.15	211	217	225	225
4	Francisco Palomeque	Colombia	79.19	185	191	193	193
5	Yurii Babynets	Ukraine	79.16	~~184~~	184	191	191
6	Gkremislav Moysiadis	Greece	76.49	186	190	~~191~~	190
7	Shadi Issa	Syria	79.34	~~183~~	183	~~186~~	183
8	Ahmad Razm Azar	Georgia	79.43	~~183~~	~~185~~	~~185~~	NM
9	Alexander Belov	Russia	79.61	~~186~~	~~186~~	~~186~~	NM

==== 88 Kg ====
Rank	Athlete	Nation	Body weight	Result (kg)			
Rank	Athlete	Nation	Body weight	1	2	3	Result
1st place, gold medalist(s)	Ye Jixiong	China	85.52	220	228	~~234.5~~	228
2nd place, silver medalist(s)	Hany Abdelhady	Egypt	87.27	207	212	216	216
3rd place, bronze medalist(s)	Abdelkareem Khattab	Jordan	83.68	~~205~~	207	213	213
4	Magomed Dzhamalov	Russia	87.13	206	211	~~216~~	211 ER
5	Sudhir Sudhir	India	86.39	206	~~211~~	~~216~~	206
6	Jainer Cantillo	Colombia	83.91	~~204~~	204	~~212~~	204
7	Farhod Umirzakov	Uzbekistan	87.45	203	~~207~~	~~212~~	203
8	Evânio da Silva	Brazil	86.15	~~206~~	~~206~~	~~212~~	NM
9	Rakhmetzhan Khamayev	Kazakhstan	86.94	~~205~~	~~205~~	~~205~~	NM

==== 97 Kg ====
Rank	Athlete	Nation	Body weight	Result (kg)			
Rank	Athlete	Nation	Body weight	1	2	3	Result
1st place, gold medalist(s)	Seyedhamed Solhipouravanji	Iran	95.47	225	230	235	235 AR
2nd place, silver medalist(s)	Yan Panpan	China	94.96	~~222~~	222	227	227
3rd place, bronze medalist(s)	Fabio Torres	Colombia	95.96	220	~~225~~	225	225
4	Mutaz Aljuneidi	Jordan	96.02	210	217	225	225
5	Petar Milenković	Serbia	95.15	216	~~222~~	223	223 ER
6	Cai Huichao	China	95.17	222	~~227~~	~~227~~	222
7	Mohammed Khamis Khalaf	United Arab Emirates	92.38	~~210~~	~~220~~	220	220
8	Mohamed Ahmed	Egypt	94.88	211	216	~~223~~	216
9	Yee Khie Jong	Malaysia	95.38	215	~~223~~	~~223~~	215

==== 107 Kg ====
Rank	Athlete	Nation	Body weight	Result (kg)			
Rank	Athlete	Nation	Body weight	1	2	3	Result
1st place, gold medalist(s)	Sodnompiljee Enkhbayar	Mongolia	105.15	~~245~~	247	~~253~~	247 WR, AR
2nd place, silver medalist(s)	Aliakbar Gharibshi	Iran	106.12	240	~~250~~	~~254~~	240
3rd place, bronze medalist(s)	Jose de Jesus Castillo	Mexico	103.54	230	235	~~240~~	235
4	Saman Razi	Iran	104.43	230	~~236~~	~~236~~	230
5	Konstantin Matsnev	Russia	105.56	220	~~231~~	~~237~~	220
6	Nuriddin Davlatov	Uzbekistan	106.50	~~212~~	218	~~221~~	218
7	Elshan Huseynov	Azerbaijan	103.25	217	~~227~~	~~235~~	217
8	Mateus de Assis Silva	Brazil	105.65	200	~~211~~	~~211~~	200

==== +107 Kg ====
Rank	Athlete	Nation	Body weight	Result (kg)			
Rank	Athlete	Nation	Body weight	1	2	3	Result
1st place, gold medalist(s)	Siamand Rahman	Iran	200.00	250	265	RET	265
2nd place, silver medalist(s)	Mansour Pourmirzaei	Iran	154.44	~~236~~	236	~~251~~	236
3rd place, bronze medalist(s)	Faris Al-Ageeli	Iraq	125.93	235	~~250~~	~~250~~	235
4	Antonio Deandre Martin	United States	171.98	227	~~235~~	~~237~~	227 AM
5	Petr Filatov	Russia	170.63	~~225~~	225	~~237~~	225
6	Jhon Castaneda	Colombia	126.35	206	213	216	216
7	Chun Keun-bae	South Korea	151.65	210	~~216~~	216	216
-	Jamil Elshebli	Jordan	127.40	~~240~~	~~240~~	RET	NM
-	Shamo Aslanov	Azerbaijan	141.09	~~216~~	~~216~~	~~225~~	NM

=== Women ===
==== 41 Kg ====
Rank	Athlete	Nation	Body weight	Result (kg)			
Rank	Athlete	Nation	Body weight	1	2	3	Result
1st place, gold medalist(s)	Cui Zhe	China	40.42	97	101	~~104.5~~	101 WR
2nd place, silver medalist(s)	Li Jinyun	China	40.19	85	89	92	92
3rd place, bronze medalist(s)	Noura Baddour	Syria	37.48	86	90	~~92~~	90
4	Nawal Ramadan	Egypt	40.50	~~87~~	87	~~91~~	87
5	Leidy Rodriguez	Cuba	40.48	86	~~88~~	~~89~~	86
6	Sakina Khatun	India	39.76	~~82~~	82	~~88~~	82
7	Yulia Vorontsova	Russia	40.12	82	~~87~~	~~89~~	82
8	Samira Guerioua	Algeria	40.00	~~80~~	81	-	~~-~~
-	Cristina Poblador	Colombia	39.29	~~88~~	~~88~~	~~89~~	NM
-	Ni Nengah Widiasih	Indonesia	40.46	~~98~~	~~98~~	~~98~~	NM

==== 45 Kg ====
Rank	Athlete	Nation	Body weight	Result (kg)			
Rank	Athlete	Nation	Body weight	1	2	3	Result
1st place, gold medalist(s)	Guo Lingling	China	44.30	114	117	118	118 WR
2nd place, silver medalist(s)	Nazmiye Muratli	Turkey	44.57	108	112	116	116 ER
3rd place, bronze medalist(s)	Latifat Tijani	Nigeria	43.59	105	~~112~~	~~116~~	105
4	Justyna Kozdryk	Poland	43.41	94	96	98	98
5	Chen Meijiao	China	41.24	93	~~95~~	95	95
6	Maryna Kopiika	Ukraine	42.72	95	~~98~~	~~98~~	95
7	Mimozette Nghamsi Fotie	Cameroon	44.67	80	~~82~~	84	84
8	Larisa Berieva	Russia	44.30	77	81	~~83~~	81
9	Iuliia Murasheva	Russia	44.41	~~77~~	~~77~~	77	77

==== 50 Kg ====
Rank	Athlete	Nation	Body weight	Result (kg)			
Rank	Athlete	Nation	Body weight	1	2	3	Result
1st place, gold medalist(s)	Rehab Ahmed	Egypt	48.91	114	~~118~~	~~120~~	114
2nd place, silver medalist(s)	Hu Dandan	China	48.95	113	~~117~~	~~119~~	113
3rd place, bronze medalist(s)	Lidiia Soloviova	Ukraine	49.03	104	106	111	111
4	Nohemi Carabali	Colombia	48.91	102	105	~~110~~	105
5	Đặng Thị Linh Phượng	Vietnam	49.09	~~95~~	~~98~~	98	98
6	Anastasiia Mamadamirova	Russia	49.45	98	~~103~~	~~103~~	98
7	Olivia Broome	United Kingdom	49.56	93	~~96~~	96	96
8	Marina Beketova	Russia	48.90	~~88~~	~~88~~	88	88

==== 55 Kg ====
Rank	Athlete	Nation	Body weight	Result (kg)			
Rank	Athlete	Nation	Body weight	1	2	3	Result
1st place, gold medalist(s)	Mariana Shevchuk	Ukraine	53.98	125	128	~~131.5~~	128
2nd place, silver medalist(s)	Xiao Cuijuan	China	54.46	117	121	126	126
3rd place, bronze medalist(s)	Tamara Podpalnaya	Russia	54.68	110	113	122	122
4	Besra Duman	Turkey	54.39	110	~~119~~	~~119~~	110
5	Camila Campos	Chile	54.54	103	106	~~110~~	106
6	Najat El Garraa	Morocco	54.83	95	100	103	103
7	Shi Shanshan	China	52.04	95	100	~~106~~	100
-	Amalia Perez	Mexico	54.23	~~120~~	~~120~~	~~121~~	NM

==== 61 Kg ====
Rank	Athlete	Nation	Body weight	Result (kg)			
Rank	Athlete	Nation	Body weight	1	2	3	Result
1st place, gold medalist(s)	Lucy Ejike	Ukraine	60.23	125	130	132	132
2nd place, silver medalist(s)	Ruza Kuzieva	Uzbekistan	55.81	120	~~125~~	125	125
3rd place, bronze medalist(s)	Rayisa Toporkova	Ukraine	60.46	118	123	~~126~~	123 ER
4	Cui Jianjin	China	60.77	115	~~121~~	121	121
5	Irina Kazantseva	Russia	57.89	105	110	~~115~~	110
6	Fatma Korany	Egypt	58.62	101	106	~~112~~	106
7	Yasemin Ceyaln Baydar	Turkey	59.11	105	~~111~~	~~111~~	105
8	Gihan Abdelaziz	Egypt	57.02	96	100	~~106~~	100
9	Anastasiia Kondrashina	Russia	58.67	92	96	~~96~~	96
10	Fatema Alhasan	Syria	60.79	~~96~~	~~96~~	96	96

==== 67 Kg ====
Rank	Athlete	Nation	Body weight	Result (kg)			
Rank	Athlete	Nation	Body weight	1	2	3	Result
1st place, gold medalist(s)	Tan Yujiao	China	66.54	133	137	~~141~~	137
2nd place, silver medalist(s)	Olaitan Ibrahim	Nigeria	63.84	122	126	127	127
3rd place, bronze medalist(s)	Fatma Omar	Egypt	64.41	116	121	~~127~~	121
4	Mariana D'Andrea	Brazil	65.47	116	120	~~122~~	120 AM
5	Kheda Berieva	Russia	66.90	111	~~118~~	118	118 ER
6	Tetyana Shyrokolava	Ukraine	62.77	112	~~117~~	117	117
7	Raushan Koishibayeva	Kazakhstan	65.79	117	~~122~~	~~122~~	117
8	Kim Hyeong-hui	South Korea	64.65	106	112	~~115~~	112
9	Bertha Fernández	Colombia	65.35	~~102~~	~~102~~	102	102

==== 73 Kg ====
Rank	Athlete	Nation	Body weight	Result (kg)			
Rank	Athlete	Nation	Body weight	1	2	3	Result
1st place, gold medalist(s)	Han Miaoyu	China	72.66	121	~~126~~	126	126
2nd place, silver medalist(s)	Sibel Çam	Turkey	71.94	~~122~~	122	124	124
3rd place, bronze medalist(s)	Amal Mahmoud	Egypt	67.42	116	121	123	123
4	Rehab Abougharbya	Egypt	70.77	110	113	117	117
5	Nataliia Oliinyk	Ukraine	72.00	116	~~121~~	~~121~~	116
6	Sanae Soubane	Morocco	72.39	110	113	~~116~~	113
7	Maria Antonieta Ortiz	Chile	72.13	~~108~~	108	~~114~~	108 AM
-	Paulina Okpala	Nigeria	71.17	~~118~~	~~121~~	~~123~~	NM
-	Souhad Ghazouani	France	72.46	~~109~~	~~109~~	~~109~~	NM

==== 79 Kg ====
Rank	Athlete	Nation	Body weight	Result (kg)			
Rank	Athlete	Nation	Body weight	1	2	3	Result
1st place, gold medalist(s)	Bose Omolayo	Nigeria	78.19	134	139	142	142 WR, AF
2nd place, silver medalist(s)	Xu Lili	China	75.55	128	~~138~~	~~139~~	128
3rd place, bronze medalist(s)	Siti Mahmudah	Indonesia	77.01	~~116~~	116	118	118
4	Asma Issa	Jordan	74.39	107	113	~~117~~	113
5	Mayagozel Ekeyeva	Turkmenistan	76.93	105	108	~~116~~	108
6	Marion Serrano	Chile	78.29	103	108	~~114~~	108
7	Lyubov Semenyuk	Ukraine	76.92	100	105	~~109~~	105

==== 86 Kg ====
Rank	Athlete	Nation	Body weight	Result (kg)			
Rank	Athlete	Nation	Body weight	1	2	3	Result
1st place, gold medalist(s)	Folashade Oluwafemiayo	Nigeria	85.62	138	145	150	150 WR, AF
2nd place, silver medalist(s)	Zheng Feifei	China	82.16	140	144	147	147 AR
3rd place, bronze medalist(s)	Vera Muratova	Russia	83.15	138	143	~~148~~	143 ER
4	Li Fengmei	China	85.24	135	139	~~144~~	139
5	Amany Ali	Egypt	84.15	125	131	~~139~~	131
6	Tharwh Tayseer Alhajaj	Jordan	84.42	116	121	127	127
7	Louise Sugden	United Kingdom	83.27	116	118	120	120

==== +86 Kg ====
Rank	Athlete	Nation	Body weight	Result (kg)			
Rank	Athlete	Nation	Body weight	1	2	3	Result
1st place, gold medalist(s)	Deng Xuemei	China	109.71	145	~~151~~	151	151 AR
2nd place, silver medalist(s)	Loveline Obiji	Nigeria	100.61	140	~~150~~	150	150
3rd place, bronze medalist(s)	Randa Mahmoud	Egypt	90.32	134	140	143	143
4	Nadia Ali	Egypt	108.79	131	135	138	138
5	Marzena Zięba	Poland	110.58	130	135	137	137 ER
6	Perla Barcenas	Mexico	96.88	133	136	~~141~~	136
7	Vasilina Shestakova	Russia	108.41	~~118~~	118	125	125
8	Irina Sadovnikova	Russia	122.53	125	~~132~~	~~137~~	125
