= 2017 World Para Powerlifting Championships =

Parasports competition in Mexico City

7th World Para Powerlifting Championships
- Host city: Mexico City
- Country: Mexico
- Athletes: 333
- Sport: Paralympic powerlifting
- Events: 20
- Dates: 2–8 December 2017

The 2017 World Para Powerlifting Championships was a competition for male and female athletes with a disability. It was held in Mexico City and ran from 2 to 8 December 2017.

The tournament was one of the compulsory tournaments to qualify for the 2020 Summer Paralympics held in Tokyo, Japan.

== Medal table ==
* Host nation (Mexico)

| Rank | NPC | Gold | Silver | Bronze | Total |
|---|---|---|---|---|---|
| 1 | China (CHN) | 5 | 5 | 2 | 12 |
| 2 | Nigeria (NGR) | 5 | 3 | 2 | 10 |
| 3 | Iran (IRI) | 3 | 4 | 1 | 8 |
| 4 | Egypt (EGY) | 3 | 0 | 2 | 5 |
| 5 | Mexico (MEX)* | 2 | 0 | 1 | 3 |
| 6 | Vietnam (VIE) | 1 | 2 | 0 | 3 |
| 7 | France (FRA) | 1 | 0 | 0 | 1 |
| 8 | Jordan (JOR) | 0 | 1 | 2 | 3 |
| 8 | Ukraine (UKR) | 0 | 1 | 2 | 3 |
| 10 | Turkey (TUR) | 0 | 1 | 1 | 2 |
| 11 | Cuba (CUB) | 0 | 1 | 0 | 1 |
| 11 | Mongolia (MGL) | 0 | 1 | 0 | 1 |
| 11 | United Arab Emirates (UAE) | 0 | 1 | 0 | 1 |
| 14 | Algeria (ALG) | 0 | 0 | 1 | 1 |
| 14 | Brazil (BRA) | 0 | 0 | 1 | 1 |
| 14 | Chinese Taipei (TPE) | 0 | 0 | 1 | 1 |
| 14 | Colombia (COL) | 0 | 0 | 1 | 1 |
| 14 | Great Britain (GBR) | 0 | 0 | 1 | 1 |
| 14 | Greece (GRE) | 0 | 0 | 1 | 1 |
| 14 | Uzbekistan (UZB) | 0 | 0 | 1 | 1 |
| Totals (20 entries) | | 20 | 20 | 20 | 60 |

== Medalists ==
=== Men ===
| Event | Gold | Silver | Bronze |
|---|---|---|---|
| 49 kg | Lê Văn Công; Vietnam | Omar Qarada; Jordan | Yakubu Adesokan; Nigeria |
| 54 kg | Roland Ezuruike; Nigeria | Nguyễn Bình An; Vietnam | Dimitrios Bakochristos; Greece |
| 59 kg | Paul Kehinde; Nigeria | Amir Jafari; Iran | Seyed Yousefi; Iran |
| 65 kg | Paul Kehinde; Nigeria | Liu Lei; China | Hocine Bettir; Algeria |
| 72 kg | Nader Moradi; Iran | Rouhollah Rostami; Iran | Hu Peng; China |
| 80 kg | Majid Farzin; Iran | Gu Xiaofei; China | Abdelkareem Khattab; Jordan |
| 88 kg | Ye Jixiong; China | Hamed Solhipour; Iran | Evânio da Silva; Brazil |
| 97 kg | Mohamed Eldib; Egypt | Mohammed Khamis Khalaf; United Arab Emirates | Fabio Torres; Colombia |
| 107 kg | Jose de Jesus Castillo; Mexico | Sodnompiljee Enkhbayar; Mongolia | Anton Kriukov; Ukraine |
| +107 kg | Siamand Rahman; Iran | Mansour Pourmirzaei; Iran | Jamil Elshebli; Jordan |

=== Women ===
| Event | Gold | Silver | Bronze |
|---|---|---|---|
| 41 kg | Cui Zhe; China | Leidy Rodríguez; Cuba | Li Jinyun; China |
| 45 kg | Guo Lingling; China | Nazmiye Muslu Muratlı; Turkey | Zoe Newson; United Kingdom |
| 50 kg | Rehab Ahmed; Egypt | Đặng Thị Linh Phượng; Vietnam | Besra Duman; Turkey |
| 55 kg | Amalia Pérez; Mexico | Mariana Shevchuk; Ukraine | Ruza Kuzieva; Uzbekistan |
| 61 kg | Lucy Ogechukwu Ejike; Nigeria | Cui Jianjin; China | Tetyana Shyrokolava; Ukraine |
| 67 kg | Tan Yujiao; China | Olaitan Ibrahim; Nigeria | Gihan Abdelaziz; Egypt |
| 73 kg | Souhad Ghazouani; France | Han Miaoyu; China | Ndidi Nwosu; Nigeria |
| 79 kg | Xu Lili; China | Bose Omolayo; Nigeria | Lin Tzu-hui; Chinese Taipei |
| 86 kg | Folashade Oluwafemiayo; Nigeria | Zheng Feifei; China | Gehan Hassan; Egypt |
| +86 kg | Randa Mahmoud; Egypt | Loveline Obiji; Nigeria | Perla Bárcenas; Mexico |
