= Bobby Body =

American paralympic powerlifter (born 1974)

Personal information
- Nationality: American
- Born: June 24, 1974 (age 52) Eaton Rapids, Michigan

Sport
- Country: United States
- Sport: Powerlifting
Medal record
Powerlifting
Representing United States
World Championships
Bronze medal – third place	2025 Cairo	107 kg
Parapan American Games
Gold medal – first place	2023 Santiago	107 & +107 kg

Bobby Body (born June 24, 1974) is an American paralympic powerlifter. He is a medalist at the World Championships and Parapan American Games. He also competed at the 2024 Summer Paralympics, where he finished in fourth place. Prior to his powerlifting career, he was in the United States Marine Corps and in the United States Army.

== Early life ==
Body was born in Eaton Rapids, Michigan to a military family; his mother was a Korean, while his father was an African-American. His mother left the family when he was five, while his father, a soldier of the United States Army, was arrested five years later, leaving him and his sister orphaned.

Sent to the VFW National Home based in his native Eaton Rapids, Body remained there up until high school. He attended Eaton Rapids High School, where he began to get into sports. After graduating from high school, he was accepted to Ferris State University, where he had studied criminal justice and played with the rugby union team. After graduating from Ferris State, he enlisted in the United States Marine Corps and was sent to San Diego. There, he injured his knee and was medically discharged. The September 11 attacks, inspired him to re-enlist, this time in the United States Army via Army National Guard. After being sent to Iraq, on February 12, 2006, Body was travelling in a Humvee when it was hit by an IED, injuring his left arm and leg in the process. This led him to be discharged from the army in 2009 and he returned to Michigan. Having undergone multiple surgeries, in September 2013, he had his left leg amputated above the knee. Shortly afterward, he took up powerlifting as a way to channel his aggression and cope with his PTSD.

== Career ==
Body began his powerlifting career in 2015 and participated in his first national meet, which he won in his division.

Body's first international appearance came at the 2021 World Championships, where he finished in ninth place. He then competed in the 2023 World Championships, where he also finished in ninth place. Three months later, Body competed at the 2023 Parapan American Games, where he won the gold medal in the 107 & +107kg event, becoming the first American to do so. This enabled him to qualify for the 2024 Summer Paralympics in the powerlifting competition, finishing in fourth place in the men's 107 kg event.

At the 2025 World Championships, Body won the bronze medal in the 107 kg event, which was his first medal in the World Championships.
