= Aminzadeh =

Aminzadeh is a surname. Notable people with the surname include:

- Ahmad Aminzadeh (born 1991), Iranian powerlifter
- Elham Aminzadeh (born 1964), Iranian academic
- Mohsen Aminzadeh (born 1957), Iranian reformist politician
