= Rita Ferdinand =

Nigerian para powerlifter (born 1995)

Personal information
- Born: 11 September 1995 (age 30)

Sport
- Country: Nigeria
- Sport: Para powerlifting
- Weight class: 79 kg
Medal record
Women's para powerlifting
Representing Nigeria
World Championships
Gold medal – first place	2025 Cairo	79 kg
Commonwealth Games
Silver medal – second place	2026 Glasgow	Heavyweight

Rita Ferdinand (born 11 September 1995) is a Nigerian para powerlifter.

== Career ==
Ferdinand made her World Para Powerlifting Championships debut in 2025 and won a gold medal in the women's up to 79 kg category, defeating 2024 Summer Paralympics gold medalist Han Miaoyu. She set an African record with a lift of 153 kg.
