= Fatma Elyan =

Egyptian Paralympic powerlifter (born 2000)

Personal information
- Born: 1 July 2000 (age 26) Giza, Egypt

Sport
- Country: Egypt
- Sport: powerlifting
- Events: -61kg -67kg
Medal record
Women's powerlifting
Representing Egypt
Summer Paralympics
Silver medal – second place	2024 Paris	–67 kg
World Championships
Silver medal – second place	2023 Dubai	61 kg

Fatma Elyan (born 1 July 2000) is an Egyptian powerlifter who has competed in the 61 kilograms (134 lb) and 67 kilograms (148 lb) brackets. She is a silver medalist at the 2023 World Para Powerlifting Championships and 2024 Summer Paralympics.

== Early life ==
Fatma Elyan was born in Giza, on 1 July 2000 with the disability of being paralyzed from the waist down.

== Career ==
Making her debut at the World Para Powerlifting Championships, Elyan, then known as Fatma Korany, competed in the 2019 edition, where she finished in sixth place. She made her Paralympic debut in the women's 61 kg event at the 2020 Summer Paralympics held in Tokyo, Japan, where she finished in fourth place. A few months later, she competed in her event at the 2021 World Para Powerlifting Championships held in Tbilisi, Georgia, where she again finished in fourth place. In 2023, she won the silver medal in her event at the 2023 World Para Powerlifting Championships held in Dubai, United Arab Emirates. Elyan returned to the Summer Paralympics in 2024 held in Paris, where she competed in the –67 kg event and won the silver medal.
