= Jeyhun Mahmudov =

Azerbaijani Paralympic powerlifter (1992)

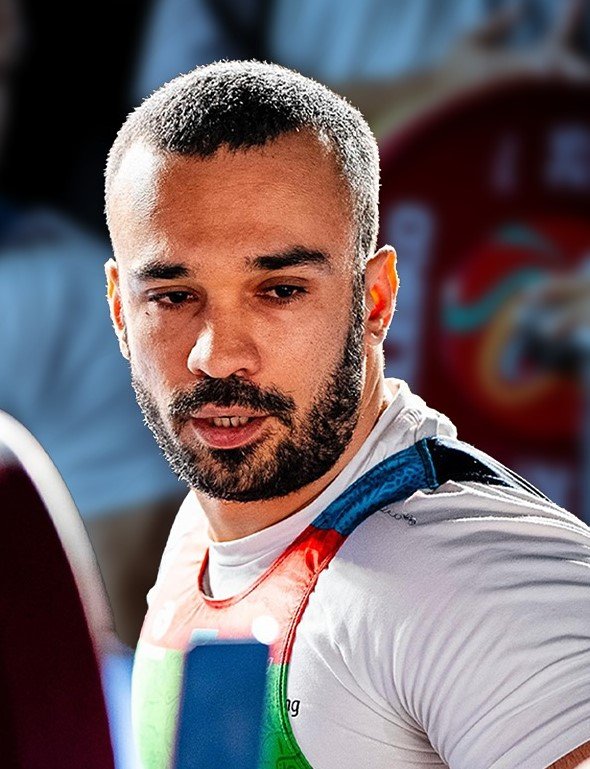

Personal information
- Native name: Ceyhun Mahmudov
- Born: 24 February 1992 (age 33); Baku, Azerbaijan

Sport
- Sport: Powerlifting

Jeyhun Kamil oglu Mahmudov (Azerbaijani: Ceyhun Kamil oğlu Mahmudov; born 24 February 1992) is an Azerbaijani Paralympic powerlifter competing in the under 54 kg weight category. He is the 2023 World Cup winner in both the individual and overall standings, and a silver medalist in the 2023 World Cup team standings. Mahmudov represented Azerbaijan at the 2024 Summer Paralympics.

== Biography ==
Jeyhun Mahmudov was born on 24 February 1992, in Baku. He studied at the Lankaran State University.

In April 2023, at the qualifying World Cup in Tbilisi, Mahmudov, competing in the under 54 kg weight category, won gold medals in both the individual category (lifting 152 kg) and the overall category (totaling 441 kg). In the team competition at this event, the Azerbaijani team, which included Mahmudov along with Zahra Dadashova and Parvin Mammadov, won silver. His performance at the Tbilisi World Cup qualified him for the 2023 World Para Powerlifting Championships in Dubai.

In August 2023, at the World Championships in Dubai, Mahmudov finished in 11th place in the under 54 kg category with a lift of 153 kg.

In March 2024, at the World Cup in Dubai, Mahmudov placed fourth in the individual and sixth in the overall standings with a lift of 156 kg.

In June 2024, Mahmudov had an unsuccessful performance at the World Cup in Tbilisi, failing to lift his attempted weights of 165 and 167 kg.

On 20 July 2024, it was announced that Jeyhun Mahmudov secured qualification for the 2024 Summer Paralympics. Mahmudov competed in the men's 54 kg category at the Paralympics. During the event, he successfully lifted 158 kg in his first and second attempts but was unsuccessful with 163 kg in his third attempt. He finished the competition with a best lift of 158 kg, placing 8th overall in his category.
