= Powerlifting at the 2022 Asian Para Games =

- Venue: Xiaoshan Sports Centre Gymnasium
- Location: Hangzhou, China
- Dates: 23–28 October 2023

Powerlifting at the 2022 Asian Para Games was held in Hangzhou, China between 23 and 28 October 2023.

== Nations ==
94 men + 68 women = 162

1. Afghanistan (2)
2. Bahrain (1)
3. China (17)
4. India (14)
5. Indonesia (9)
6. Iran (14)
7. Iraq (5)
8. Japan (8)
9. Jordan (6)
10. Kazakhstan (12)
11. Kyrgyzstan (4)
12. South Korea (7)
13. Saudi Arabia (4)
14. Laos (2)
15. Malaysia (5)
16. Mongolia (1)
17. Nepal (2)
18. Oman (1)
19. Philippines (4)
20. Singapore (1)
21. Sri Lanka (1)
22. Syria (3)
23. Chinese Taipei (5)
24. Tajikistan (2)
25. Turkmenistan (9)
26. Thailand (7)
27. Timor-Leste (2)
28. United Arab Emirates (4)
29. Uzbekistan (5)
30. Vietnam (4)
31. Yemen (1)

== Entries ==
Events	M/W 1	M/W 2	M/W 3	M/W 4	M/W 5	M/W 6	M/W 7	M/W 8	M/W 9	M/W 10
Men's	12	10	9	11	12	11	8	8	7	6
Women's	8	6	8	8	4	6	8	6	7	7

== Medal table ==
Rank	Nation	Gold	Silver	Bronze	Total
1	China (CHN)	14	3	0	17
2	Iran (IRI)	2	4	5	11
3	Jordan (JOR)	2	2	1	5
4	Kazakhstan (KAZ)	1	2	2	5
5	Malaysia (MAS)	1	0	1	2
6	Uzbekistan (UZB)	0	3	1	4
7	Indonesia (INA)	0	2	1	3
8	India (IND)	0	1	2	3
8	Vietnam (VIE)	0	1	2	3
10	Iraq (IRQ)	0	1	1	2
11	Mongolia (MGL)	0	1	0	1
12	South Korea (KOR)	0	0	2	2
13	Syria (SYR)	0	0	1	1
13	Thailand (THA)	0	0	1	1
Totals (14 entries)		20	20	20	60

== Medalists ==
=== Men ===
Event	Gold	Silver	Bronze
49 kg	Omar Qarada; Jordan	Muslim Al-Sudani; Iraq	Lê Văn Công; Vietnam
54 kg	David Degtyarev; Kazakhstan	Yang Jinglang; China	Nguyễn Bình An; Vietnam
59 kg	Qi Yongkai; China	Mohsen Bakhtiar; Iran	Seyed Yousef Yousefi Pashaki; Iran
65 kg	Zou Yi; China	Amir Jafari Arangeh; Iran	Ashok Malik; India
72 kg	Bonnie Bunyau Gustin; Malaysia	Hu Peng; China	Bekzod Jamilov; Uzbekistan
80 kg	Gu Xiaofei; China	Rouhollah Rostami; Iran	Rasool Mohsin; Iraq
88 kg	Abdelkareem Khattab; Jordan	Ye Jixiong; China	Rakhmetzhan Khamayev; Kazakhstan
97 kg	Yan Panpan; China	Farhod Umirzakov; Uzbekistan	Nicodemus Manggoi Moses; Malaysia
107 kg	Aliakbar Gharibshahi; Iran	Enkhbayaryn Sodnompiljee; Mongolia	Saman Razi; Iran
+107 kg	Ahmad Aminzadeh; Iran	Mahdi Sayadi; Iran	Jamil Elshebli; Jordan

=== Women ===
Event	Gold	Silver	Bronze
41 kg	Guo Lingling; China	Tursynay Kabyl; Kazakhstan	Noura Baddour; Syria
45 kg	Cui Zhe; China	Ni Nengah Widiasih; Indonesia	Gulim Kurmanbayeva; Kazakhstan
50 kg	Wei Yi; China	Đặng Thị Linh Phượng; Vietnam	Kamolpan Kraratpet; Thailand
55 kg	Xiao Jinping; China	Muslima Nuriddinova; Uzbekistan	Mahdieh Mohammadian; Iran
61 kg	Cui Jianjin; China	Zainab Khatoon; India	Raj Kumari; India
67 kg	Tan Yujiao; China	Kudratoy Toshpulatova; Uzbekistan	Kim Hyeong-hui; South Korea
73 kg	Xu Lili; China	Raushan Koishibayeva; Kazakhstan	Zahra Aghaeisamani; Iran
79 kg	Han Miaoyu; China	Asma Issa; Jordan	Siti Mahmudah; Indonesia
86 kg	Zheng Feifei; China	Tharwat Alhajjaj; Jordan	Yang Jae-won; South Korea
+86 kg	Deng Xuemei; China	Sriyanti; Indonesia	Nikoo Rozbahani; Iran

== Final results ==
=== Men ===
1. https://resultsapg.hangzhou2022.com.cn/APG2022/data/PWL/PWLM49KG----00000-----------------_DT_PDF_C73.pdf?random=0.08429933177163296
2. https://resultsapg.hangzhou2022.com.cn/APG2022/data/PWL/PWLM54KG----00000-----------------_DT_PDF_C73.pdf?random=0.6024548298384308
3. https://resultsapg.hangzhou2022.com.cn/APG2022/data/PWL/PWLM59KG----00000-----------------_DT_PDF_C73.pdf?random=0.12337931090629939
4. https://resultsapg.hangzhou2022.com.cn/APG2022/data/PWL/PWLM65KG----00000-----------------_DT_PDF_C73.pdf?random=0.46640805409870467
5. https://resultsapg.hangzhou2022.com.cn/APG2022/data/PWL/PWLM72KG----00000-----------------_DT_PDF_C73.pdf?random=0.8584998870031841
6. https://resultsapg.hangzhou2022.com.cn/APG2022/data/PWL/PWLM80KG----00000-----------------_DT_PDF_C73.pdf?random=0.25696902754290474
7. https://resultsapg.hangzhou2022.com.cn/APG2022/data/PWL/PWLM88KG----00000-----------------_DT_PDF_C73.pdf?random=0.4683600293357755
8. https://resultsapg.hangzhou2022.com.cn/APG2022/data/PWL/PWLM97KG----00000-----------------_DT_PDF_C73.pdf?random=0.24380466678534152
9. https://resultsapg.hangzhou2022.com.cn/APG2022/data/PWL/PWLM107KG---00000-----------------_DT_PDF_C73.pdf?random=0.542217996952022
10. https://resultsapg.hangzhou2022.com.cn/APG2022/data/PWL/PWLMO107KG--00000-----------------_DT_PDF_C73.pdf?random=0.8228592106017392

=== Women ===
1. https://resultsapg.hangzhou2022.com.cn/APG2022/data/PWL/PWLW41KG----00000-----------------_DT_PDF_C73.pdf?random=0.007369596418611568
2. https://resultsapg.hangzhou2022.com.cn/APG2022/data/PWL/PWLW45KG----00000-----------------_DT_PDF_C73.pdf?random=0.04638483210818556
3. https://resultsapg.hangzhou2022.com.cn/APG2022/data/PWL/PWLW50KG----00000-----------------_DT_PDF_C73.pdf?random=0.6540547308455489
4. https://resultsapg.hangzhou2022.com.cn/APG2022/data/PWL/PWLW55KG----00000-----------------_DT_PDF_C73.pdf?random=0.3558377893942316
5. https://resultsapg.hangzhou2022.com.cn/APG2022/data/PWL/PWLW61KG----00000-----------------_DT_PDF_C73.pdf?random=0.8390348184376282
6. https://resultsapg.hangzhou2022.com.cn/APG2022/data/PWL/PWLW67KG----00000-----------------_DT_PDF_C73.pdf?random=0.7301659713507123
7. https://resultsapg.hangzhou2022.com.cn/APG2022/data/PWL/PWLW73KG----00000-----------------_DT_PDF_C73.pdf?random=0.7798686698716352
8. https://resultsapg.hangzhou2022.com.cn/APG2022/data/PWL/PWLW79KG----00000-----------------_DT_PDF_C73.pdf?random=0.08543647978104563
9. https://resultsapg.hangzhou2022.com.cn/APG2022/data/PWL/PWLW86KG----00000-----------------_DT_PDF_C73.pdf?random=0.9687295723571252
10. https://resultsapg.hangzhou2022.com.cn/APG2022/data/PWL/PWLWO86KG---00000-----------------_DT_PDF_C73.pdf?random=0.3760542067677213

== See also ==
- Powerlifting at the 2023 ASEAN Para Games
- Weightlifting at the 2022 Asian Games
