= Olaitan Ibrahim =

Nigerian Paralympic powerlifter

Personal information
- Born: 14 February 1986 (age 40) Oba Ile, Nigeria

Sport
- Country: Nigeria
- Sport: Paralympic powerlifting
Medal record
Paralympic Games
Bronze medal – third place	2020 Tokyo	67 kg
World Championships
Silver medal – second place	2017 Mexico City	67 kg
Silver medal – second place	2019 Nur-Sultan	67 kg

Olaitan Ibrahim (born 14 February 1986) is a Nigerian Paralympic powerlifter. She won the bronze medal in the women's 67 kg event at the 2020 Summer Paralympics held in Tokyo, Japan.

At the 2019 World Para Powerlifting Championships held in Nur-Sultan, Kazakhstan, she won the silver medal in the women's 67 kg event.

== Results ==
Year	Venue	Weight	Attempts (kg)			Total	Rank
Year	Venue	Weight	1	2	3	Total	Rank
Summer Paralympics
2021	Tokyo, Japan	67 kg	115	119	~~127~~	119	3rd place, bronze medalist(s)
World Championships
2017	Mexico City, Mexico	67 kg	110	~~120~~	~~120~~	110	2nd place, silver medalist(s)
2019	Nur-Sultan, Kazakhstan	67 kg	122	126	127	127	2nd place, silver medalist(s)
