= Ashok (powerlifter) =

Indian para athlete

Personal information
- Full name: Ashok Kumar Malik
- Born: 27 April 1989 (age 37) India

Sport
- Country: India
- Sport: Para powerlifting
- Weight class: −65 kg (143 lb)
Medal record
Men's Powerlifting
Representing India
Asian Para Games
Bronze medal – third place	2022 Hangzhou	−65 kg

Ashok Kumar Malik (born 27 April 1989) is an Indian para powerlifter from Haryana who qualified to represent India at the 2024 Summer Paralympics at Paris and finished sixth. He won silver medals in the Para Powerlifting World Cup, in Egypt in March 2024 to clinch an Olympic berth for India.

== Early life ==
Ashok is from Haryana. He did his graduation from Maharshi Dayanand University, Rohtak, Haryana. He trains under coach kinesiologist Tanvir Logani and Jitender Pal Singh is his national coach. He was injured during the 2018 Asian Para Games where his radius and ulna bones were crushed and protruded out of his skin.

== Career ==
Ashok won a bronze medal at the 2022 Asian Para Games at Hangzhou, China. He trained under coach JP Singh for Asian Games. He won a gold medal at the Asia Oceania Para Powerlifting Championships 2022 at Pyeongtaek, South Korea in June 2022.
