= Yurii Babynets =

Ukrainian paralympic powerlifter

Personal information
- Born: 17 July 1995 (age 30)

Sport
- Country: Ukraine
- Sport: Powerlifting
Medal record
Powerlifting
Representing Ukraine
Paralympic Games
Bronze medal – third place	2024 Paris	88 kg
World Championships
Bronze medal – third place	2019 Nur-Sultan	Mixed team

Yurii Babynets (Ukrainian: Юрій Бабинець; born 17 July 1995) is a Ukrainian paralympic powerlifter. He competed at the 2024 Summer Paralympics, winning the bronze medal in the men's 88 kg event. He also competed in the men's 80 kg event at the 2020 Summer Paralympics held in Tokyo, Japan.
