= Parmjeet Kumar =

Indian para athlete

Personal information
- Born: 2 February 1992 (age 34) India

Sport
- Country: India
- Sport: Para powerlifting
- Weight class: −49 kg (108 lb)
Medal record
Men's Powerlifting
Representing India
World Para Championships
Gold medal – first place	2023 Dubai	−49 kg
Bronze medal – third place	2021 Tbilisi	−49 kg
Asian Para Games
Bronze medal – third place	2018 Jakarta	−49 kg

Parmjeet Kumar (born 2 February 1992) is an Indian para power lifter from Punjab. He became the first power lifter from India to win a medal at the World Para Powerlifting Championships. He qualified for the 2024 Summer Paralympics in Paris where he finished eighth after lifting 150 kg in his first lift in men's upto 49 kg category. He later failed in his other two lifts at 156 kg and 161 kg.

At the age of two years, he was affected by polio in his both legs.

He won a bronze medal in the men's 49 kg category at the World Championships in Tbilisi, Georgia in November 2021. He also won a bronze medal in the 2018 Asian Para Games.
