= Xiao Jinping =

Chinese Paralympic powerlifter

Personal information
- Born: 8 March 1998 (age 28)
- Home town: Nanchang, China

Sport
- Country: China
- Sport: Paralympic powerlifting
- Weight class: 50 kg
Medal record
Women's paralympic powerlifting
Representing China
Paralympic Games
Silver medal – second place	2024 Paris	50 kg
World Championships
Bronze medal – third place	2023 Dubai	55 kg
Asian Para Games
Gold medal – first place	2022 Hangzhou	55 kg

Xiao Jinping (born 8 March 1998) is a Chinese Paralympic powerlifter. She represented China at the 2024 Summer Paralympics.

== Career ==
Xiao represented China at the 2024 Summer Paralympics and won a silver medal in the 50 kg event.
