= Powerlifting at the 2024 Summer Paralympics =

Powerlifting at the XVII Paralympic Games
- Paralympic Powerlifting
- Venue: Porte de La Chapelle Arena, Paris
- Dates: 4–8 September 2024
- Competitors: 180 from 60 nations

Powerlifting at the 2024 Summer Paralympics in Paris, France took place between 4 and 8 September 2024 in Porte de La Chapelle Arena. There were twenty events in total, consisting of ten events for both men and women.

== Qualification ==
Ranking list starts from 1 March 2022 and ends on 26 June 2024.

== Qualified nations ==
- Algeria (3)
- Argentina (1)
- Armenia (1)
- Australia (2)
- Azerbaijan (1)
- Brazil (11)
- Cameroon (1)
- Chile (4)
- China (16)
- Chinese Taipei (1)
- Colombia (5)
- Cuba (1)
- Cyprus (1)
- Dominican Republic (1)
- Ecuador (1)
- Egypt (13)
- El Salvador (1)
- France (4)
- Georgia (1)
- Ghana (1)
- Great Britain (7)
- Greece (2)
- Hungary (1)
- India (4)
- Indonesia (3)
- Iran (6)
- Iraq (3)
- Ireland (1)
- Italy (3)
- Ivory Coast (1)
- Japan (1)
- Jordan (7)
- Kazakhstan (5)
- Kenya (1)
- Kyrgyzstan (1)
- Libya (1)
- Malaysia (3)
- Mexico (3)
- Moldova (1)
- Mongolia (1)
- Morocco (2)
- Nigeria (8)
- Panama (1)
- Peru (1)
- Poland (4)
- Refugee Paralympic Team (1)
- Saudi Arabia (1)
- Serbia (1)
- South Korea (4)
- Spain (1)
- Thailand (2)
- Turkey (5)
- Turkmenistan (1)
- Uganda (1)
- Ukraine (4)
- United Arab Emirates (1)
- United States (2)
- Uzbekistan (8)
- Venezuela (1)
- Vietnam (4)

== Medals ==
Rank	NPC	Gold	Silver	Bronze	Total
1	China	6	8	1	15
2	Iran	3	0	1	4
3	Egypt	2	2	2	6
4	Nigeria	2	2	0	4
5	Brazil	2	0	2	4
6	Jordan	2	0	0	2
7	Kazakhstan	1	0	0	1
7	Malaysia	1	0	0	1
7	Venezuela	1	0	0	1
10	Turkey	0	2	2	4
11	Great Britain	0	2	1	3
12	Ukraine	0	1	1	2
13	Cuba	0	1	0	1
13	Mongolia	0	1	0	1
13	Uzbekistan	0	1	0	1
16	Mexico	0	0	2	2
17	Algeria	0	0	1	1
17	Chile	0	0	1	1
17	Colombia	0	0	1	1
17	Georgia	0	0	1	1
17	Iraq	0	0	1	1
17	Italy	0	0	1	1
17	Thailand	0	0	1	1
17	Vietnam	0	0	1	1
Totals (24 entries)		20	20	20	60

== Medalists ==
=== Men ===
Event	Gold	Silver	Bronze
49 kg	Omar Qarada; Jordan	Abdullah Kayapınar; Turkey	Lê Văn Công; Vietnam
54 kg	David Degtyarev; Kazakhstan	Pablo Ramírez Barrientos; Cuba	Yang Jinglang; China
59 kg	Mohamed Elmenyawy; Egypt	Qi Yongkai; China	Mohsen Bakhtiar; Iran
65 kg	Zou Yi; China	Mark Swan; Great Britain	Hocine Bettir; Algeria
72 kg	Bonnie Bunyau Gustin; Malaysia	Hu Peng; China	Donato Telesca; Italy
80 kg	Rouhollah Rostami; Iran	Gu Xiaofei; China	Rasool Mohsin; Iraq
88 kg	Yan Panpan; China	Mohamed Elelfat; Egypt	Yurii Babynets; Ukraine
97 kg	Abdelkareem Khattab; Jordan	Ye Jixiong; China	Fabio Torres; Colombia
107 kg	Aliakbar Gharibshahi; Iran	Enkhbayaryn Sodnompiljee; Mongolia	José de Jesús Castillo; Mexico
+107 kg	Ahmad Aminzadeh; Iran	Anton Kriukov; Ukraine	Akaki Jintcharadze; Georgia

=== Women ===
Event	Gold	Silver	Bronze
41 kg	Cui Zhe; China	Esther Nworgu; Nigeria	Lara Aparecida de Lima; Brazil
45 kg	Guo Lingling; China	Zoe Newson; Great Britain	Nazmiye Muslu Muratlı; Turkey
50 kg	Clara Fuentes Monasterio; Venezuela	Xiao Jinping; China	Olivia Broome; Great Britain
55 kg	Rehab Ahmed; Egypt	Besra Duman; Turkey	Kamolpan Kraratpet; Thailand
61 kg	Onyinyechi Mark; Nigeria	Cui Jianjin; China	Amalia Pérez; Mexico
67 kg	Tan Yujiao; China	Fatma Elyan; Egypt	Maria de Fátima Castro; Brazil
73 kg	Mariana D'Andrea; Brazil	Ruza Kuzieva; Uzbekistan	Sibel Çam; Turkey
79 kg	Han Miaoyu; China	Bose Omolayo; Nigeria	Safaa Hassan; Egypt
86 kg	Tayana Medeiros; Brazil	Zheng Feifei; China	Marion Serrano; Chile
+86 kg	Folashade Oluwafemiayo; Nigeria	Deng Xuemei; China	Nadia Ali; Egypt

== See also ==
- Weightlifting at the 2024 Summer Olympics
