= Hu Peng =

Chinese Paralympic powerlifter

Personal information
- Nationality: Chinese
- Born: 26 January 1989 (age 37) Zhenjiang, China

Sport
- Sport: powerlifting
Medal record
Powerlifting
Representing China
Summer Paralympics
Silver medal – second place	2016 Rio de Janeiro	65 kg
Silver medal – second place	2024 Paris	72 kg
Bronze medal – third place	2012 London	75 kg
World Championships
Gold medal – first place	2019 Nur-Sultan	72 kg
Silver medal – second place	2021 Tbilisi	72 kg
Bronze medal – third place	2017 Mexico City	72 kg
Asian Para Games
Silver medal – second place	2010 Guangzhou	75 kg
Silver medal – second place	2022 Hangzhou	72 kg

Hu Peng (born 26 January 1989 in Zhenjiang) is a Chinese powerlifter.

== Career ==
He won the silver medal at the Men's 65 kg event at the 2016 Summer Paralympics, with 200 kilograms. In 2021, he did not perform a successful lift in the men's 72 kg event at the 2020 Summer Paralympics in Tokyo, Japan. A few months later, he won the silver medal in his event at the 2021 World Para Powerlifting Championships held in Tbilisi, Georgia. In 2024, he won a silver medal in the men's 72 kg event at the 2024 Summer Paralympics in Paris, France after successfully lifting 214 kg.
