= Lara Aparecida de Lima =

Brazilian Paralympic powerlifter (born 2003)

Personal information
- Full name: Lara Aparecida Ferreira Sulivan de Lima
- Born: 5 April 2003 (age 23) Uberlândia, Brazil

Sport
- Country: Brazil
- Sport: Paralympic powerlifting
- Weight class: 41 kg
Medal record
Women's powerlifting
Representing Brazil
Paralympic Games
Bronze medal – third place	2024 Paris	41 kg
World Championships
Gold medal – first place	2025 Cairo	Team
Bronze medal – third place	2025 Cairo	41 kg
Bronze medal – third place	2023 Dubai	41 kg
Parapan American Games
Gold medal – first place	2023 Santiago	41 kg
South American Para Games
Gold medal – first place	2026 Valledupar	Team
Silver medal – second place	2026 Valledupar	41 kg

Lara Aparecida Ferreira Sulivan de Lima (born 25 April 2003) is a Brazilian Paralympic powerlifter.

== Career ==
She represented Brazil at the 2024 Summer Paralympics and won a bronze medal in the 41 kg event.
