= Zou Yi =

Chinese Paralympic powerlifter

Personal information
- Born: 11 November 1995 (age 30) Jiangxi, China

Sport
- Country: China
- Sport: Paralympic powerlifting
- Weight class: 65 kg
Medal record
Men's paralympic powerlifting
Representing China
Paralympic Games
Gold medal – first place	2024 Paris	65 kg
World Championships
Gold medal – first place	2023 Dubai	65 kg
Bronze medal – third place	2021 Tbilisi	65 kg
Asian Para Games
Gold medal – first place	2022 Hangzhou	65 kg

Zou Yi (born 11 November 1995) is a Chinese Paralympic powerlifter. He represented China at the 2024 Summer Paralympics.

== Career ==
Zou represented China at the 2024 Summer Paralympics and won a gold medal in the 65 kg event.
