= Kamolpan Kraratpet =

Thai Paralympic powerlifter (born 2001)

Personal information
- Born: 12 March 2001 (age 25) Udon Thani, Thailand

Sport
- Country: Thailand
- Sport: Paralympic powerlifting
- Weight class: 55 kg
Medal record
Women's paralympic powerlifting
Representing Thailand
Paralympic Games
Bronze medal – third place	2024 Paris	55 kg
Asian Para Games
Bronze medal – third place	2022 Hangzhou	50 kg

Kamolpan Kraratpet (born 12 March 2001) is a Thai Paralympic powerlifter. She represented Thailand at the 2024 Summer Paralympics.

== Career ==
Kraratpet represented Thailand at the 2024 Summer Paralympics and won a bronze medal in the 55 kg powerlifting event.
