= Donato Telesca =

Italian paralympic powerlifter

Personal information
- Born: 1999 (age 26–27)

Sport
- Country: Italy
- Sport: Powerlifting
Medal record
Powerlifting
Representing Italy
Paralympic Games
Bronze medal – third place	2024 Paris	72 kg
World Championships
Silver medal – second place	2023 Dubai	72 kg

Donato Telesca (born 1999) is an Italian paralympic powerlifter. He competed at the 2024 Summer Paralympics, winning the bronze medal in the men's 72 kg event. He also competed in the men's 80 kg event at the 2020 Summer Paralympics held in Tokyo, Japan.
