= Mohsen Bakhtiar =

Iranian Paralympic powerlifter (born 1998)

Personal information
- Born: 17 May 1998 (age 28) Karaj, Iran

Sport
- Country: Iran
- Sport: Paralympic powerlifting
- Weight class: 59 kg
Medal record
Men's paralympic powerlifting
Representing Iran
Paralympic Games
Bronze medal – third place	2024 Paris	59 kg
Asian Para Games
Silver medal – second place	2022 Hangzhou	59 kg
Bronze medal – third place	2026 Aichi–Nagoya	72 kg

Mohsen Bakhtiar (born 17 May 1998) is an Iranian Paralympic powerlifter. He represented Iran at the 2024 Summer Paralympics.

== Career ==
Bakhtiar represented Iran at the 2022 Asian Para Games and won a silver medal in the 59 kg event.

Bakhtiar represented Iran at the 2024 Summer Paralympics and won a bronze medal in the 59 kg powerlifting event.
