= Abdullah Kayapınar =

Turkish powerlifter (born 1992)

Personal information
- Born: 10 February 1992 (age 34) Sivas, Turkey
- Height: 1.25 m (4 ft 1 in)
- Weight: 49 kg (108 lb)

Sport
- Sport: Powerlifting
- Coached by: Semih Ceylan
Medal record
Men's Para powerlifting
Representing Turkey
Paralympic Games
Silver medal – second place	2024 Paris	49 kg
World Championships
Bronze medal – third place	2023 Dubai	49 kg

Abdullah Kayapınar (born 10 February 1992) is a Turkish Paralympian para powerlifter who competes in the -49 kg division. He won the silver medal in the men's 49 kg event at the 2024 Summer Paralympics held in Paris, France.

== Sport career ==
Kayapınar met coach Semih Ceylan in 2014 while he was working as a waiter in a restaurant in his hometown Sivas. He started performing para powerlifting with the encouragement of Ceylan.

He competed at the 2019 World Para Powerlifting Championships in Nur Sultan, Kazakhstan, lifting 149 kg, which brought him the seventh place.

He lifted 150 kg at the 2020 Tokyo Paralympic Games, and ranked fifth.

He took the bronze medal with his lift of 173 kg at the 2023 World Para Powerlifting Championships in Dubai, United Arab Emirates.

He competed at the 2024 Para Powerlifting World Cup in Sharm El Sheikh, Egypt, where he lifted 161 kg.

His participations in Kazakhstan and Eğypt enabled him a spot at the 2024 Summer Paralympics in Paris, France. At the 2024 Paris Paralympic Games, he lifted 180 kg, and won the silver medal.

== Personal life ==
Abdullah Kayapınar was born in Sivas, Turkey on 10 February 1992. He has congenital short stature disorder, being 1.25 m (4 ft 1 in) tall at 49 kg (108 lb).
