= Safaa Hassan =

Egyptian Paralympic powerlifter

Personal information
- Born: 14 July 1986 (age 39)
- Home town: Cairo, Egypt

Sport
- Country: Egypt
- Sport: Paralympic powerlifting
- Weight class: 79 kg
Medal record
Women's paralympic powerlifting
Representing Egypt
Paralympic Games
Bronze medal – third place	2024 Paris	79 kg

Safaa Hassan (born 14 July 1986) is an Egyptian Paralympic powerlifter. She represented Egypt at the 2024 Summer Paralympics.

== Career ==
Hassan represented Egypt at the 2024 Summer Paralympics and won a bronze medal in the 79 kg event.
