= Nguyễn Bình An =

Vietnamese Paralympic powerlifter

Personal information
- Nationality: Vietnamese
- Born: 28 January 1985 (age 41)

Sport
- Sport: Paralympic powerlifting
- Event: Men's 54 kg
Medal record
Powerlifting
Representing Vietnam
World Championships
Silver medal – second place	2017 Mexico City	54 kg
Asian Para Games
Gold medal – first place	2018 Jakarta	54 kg
Gold medal – first place	2014 Incheon	54 kg
Bronze medal – third place	2022 Hangzhou	54 kg

Nguyễn Bình An (born 28 January 1985) is a Vietnamese Paralympic powerlifter. He competed for vietnam at the 2012 Summer Paralympics, 2016 Summer Paralympics and 2024 Summer Paralympics. He win a silver medal in the men's up to 54 kg event at the 2017 World Para Powerlifting Championships. He also won gold medals in the men's 54 kg event at the 2014 Asian Para Games and 2018 Asian Para Games, and a bronze medal in the same event at the 2022 Asian Para Games.
