= Yan Panpan =

Chinese Paralympic powerlifter

Personal information
- Born: 5 February 1990 (age 36) Cangzhou, China

Sport
- Country: China
- Sport: Paralympic powerlifting
- Weight class: 97 kg
Medal record
Paralympic Games
Gold medal – first place	2020 Tokyo	97 kg
Gold medal – first place	2024 Paris	88 kg
World Championships
Gold medal – first place	2023 Dubai	97 kg
Silver medal – second place	2019 Nur-Sultan	97 kg
Asian Para Games
Gold medal – first place	2022 Hangzhou	97 kg

Yan Panpan (born 5 February 1990) is a Chinese Paralympic powerlifter. He won the gold medal in the men's 97 kg event at the 2020 Summer Paralympics held in Tokyo, Japan. He also won gold at the 2024 Summer Paralympics held in Paris, France.
