= Nataliia Oliinyk =

Ukrainian Paralympic powerlifter

Personal information
- Born: 9 July 1981 (age 44) Popasna, Ukraine

Sport
- Country: Ukraine
- Sport: Paralympic powerlifting
Medal record
Paralympic Games
Silver medal – second place	2020 Tokyo	79 kg
World Championships
Silver medal – second place	2023 Dubai	86 kg
Bronze medal – third place	2021 Tbilisi	86 kg

Nataliia Oliinyk (born 9 July 1981) is a Ukrainian Paralympic powerlifter. She won the silver medal in the women's 79 kg event at the 2020 Summer Paralympics held in Tokyo, Japan. A few months later, she won the bronze medal in the women's 86 kg event at the 2021 World Para Powerlifting Championships held in Tbilisi, Georgia.

In March 2021, she won the silver medal in the women's 79 kg event at the 2021 World Para Powerlifting World Cup event held in Manchester, United Kingdom. In June 2021, she won the bronze medal in her event at the 2021 World Para Powerlifting World Cup event held in Dubai, United Arab Emirates.
