= Qi Yongkai =

Chinese Paralympic powerlifter

Personal information
- Native name: 齐勇凯
- Born: 8 November 1998 (age 27) Hebei, China

Sport
- Country: China
- Sport: Paralympic powerlifting
Medal record
Paralympic Games
Gold medal – first place	2020 Tokyo	59 kg
Silver medal – second place	2024 Paris	59 kg
World Championships
Gold medal – first place	2023 Dubai	59 kg
Silver medal – second place	2019 Nur-Sultan	59 kg
Asian Para Games
Gold medal – first place	2022 Hangzhou	59 kg

Qi Yongkai (born 8 November 1998) is a Chinese Paralympic powerlifter. He won the gold medal in the men's 59 kg event at the 2020 Summer Paralympics held in Tokyo, Japan. He also won silver at the 2024 Summer Paralympics held in Paris, France.
