= Anton Kriukov =

Ukrainian paralympic powerlifter

Sport
- Country: Ukraine
- Sport: Powerlifting
Medal record
Powerlifting
Representing Ukraine
Paralympic Games
Silver medal – second place	2024 Paris	+107 kg
World Championships
Bronze medal – third place	2017 Mexico City	107 kg
Gold medal – first place	2023 Dubai	107 kg

Anton Kriukov is a Ukrainian paralympic powerlifter. He competed at the 2024 Summer Paralympics, winning the silver medal in the men's +107 kg event.
