= Deng Xuemei =

Chinese Paralympic powerlifter

Personal information
- Born: 3 December 1991 (age 34) Ganzhou, China

Sport
- Country: China
- Sport: Paralympic powerlifting
Medal record
Paralympic Games
Gold medal – first place	2020 Tokyo	+86 kg
Silver medal – second place	2024 Paris	+86 kg
World Championships
Gold medal – first place	2019 Nur-Sultan	+86 kg
Gold medal – first place	2021 Tbilisi	+86 kg
Asian Para Games
Gold medal – first place	2014 Incheon	86 kg
Gold medal – first place	2022 Hangzhou	+86 kg

Deng Xuemei (born 3 December 1991 in Ganzhou) is a Chinese Paralympic powerlifter.

== Career ==
She won the gold medal in the women's +86 kg event at the 2020 Summer Paralympics held in Tokyo, Japan. She is also a two-time gold medalist in this event at the World Para Powerlifting Championships.

== Results ==
Year	Venue	Weight	Attempts (kg)			Total	Rank
Year	Venue	Weight	1	2	3	Total	Rank
Summer Paralympics
2021	Tokyo, Japan	+86 kg	147	151	153	153	1st place, gold medalist(s)
World Championships
2019	Nur-Sultan, Kazakhstan	+86 kg	145	~~151~~	151	151	1st place, gold medalist(s)
2021	Tbilisi, Georgia	+86 kg	132	137	140	140	1st place, gold medalist(s)
