= 2021 World Para Powerlifting Championships =

Parasports competition in Tbilisi, Georgia

9th World Para Powerlifting Championships
- Host city: Tbilisi
- Country: Georgia
- Athletes: 437
- Sport: Paralympic powerlifting
- Events: 20
- Dates: 27 November–5 December 2021

The 2021 World Para Powerlifting Championships was a powerlifting competition for athletes with a disability. It was held in Tbilisi, Georgia from 27 November to 5 December. It was previously scheduled to be held in Batumi, Georgia and, before that, it was scheduled to be held in Eger, Hungary.

The tournament was one of the compulsory tournaments to qualify for the 2024 Summer Paralympics in Paris, France.

== Medal table ==
=== Senior ===
* Host nation (Georgia)

Rank	NPC	Gold	Silver	Bronze	Total
1	China (CHN)	5	4	4	13
2	Iran (IRI)	3	3	1	7
3	Nigeria (NGR)	3	1	2	6
4	Egypt (EGY)	2	1	4	7
5	Jordan (JOR)	2	0	1	3
6	Ukraine (UKR)	1	0	2	3
7	Mexico (MEX)	1	0	1	2
8	Algeria (ALG)	1	0	0	1
8	Kazakhstan (KAZ)	1	0	0	1
8	Malaysia (MAS)	1	0	0	1
11	Russian Paralympic Committee	0	3	3	6
12	Great Britain (GBR)	0	2	0	2
13	Brazil (BRA)	0	1	0	1
13	El Salvador (ESA)	0	1	0	1
13	Mongolia (MGL)	0	1	0	1
13	Turkey (TUR)	0	1	0	1
13	Venezuela (VEN)	0	1	0	1
13	Vietnam (VIE)	0	1	0	1
19	Chile (CHI)	0	0	1	1
19	India (IND)	0	0	1	1
Totals (20 entries)		20	20	20	60

=== Junior ===
* Host nation (Georgia)

Rank	NPC	Gold	Silver	Bronze	Total
1	Great Britain (GBR)	3	1	1	5
2	Russia (RUS)	2	0	1	3
3	Mexico (MEX)	2	0	0	2
3	Ukraine (UKR)	2	0	0	2
5	Egypt (EGY)	1	1	0	2
5	Iraq (IRQ)	1	1	0	2
7	Brazil (BRA)	1	0	2	3
8	Azerbaijan (AZE)	1	0	1	2
9	Algeria (ALG)	1	0	0	1
9	Iran (IRI)	1	0	0	1
11	Kazakhstan (KAZ)	0	3	1	4
12	Jordan (JOR)	0	1	0	1
12	Kyrgyzstan (KGZ)	0	1	0	1
14	Belarus (BLR)	0	0	1	1
Totals (14 entries)		15	8	7	30

== Medalists ==
=== Men ===
Event	Gold	Silver	Bronze
49 kg	Omar Qarada; Jordan	Lê Văn Công; Vietnam	Parmjeet Kumar; India
54 kg	David Degtyarev; Kazakhstan	Yang Jinglang; China	Taha Abdelmajid; Egypt
59 kg	Sherif Othman; Egypt	Herbert Aceituno; El Salvador	Juan Garrido Acevedo; Chile
65 kg	Hocine Bettir; Algeria	Amir Jafari; Iran	Zou Yi; China
72 kg	Bonnie Bunyau Gustin; Malaysia	Hu Peng; China	Shaaban Ibrahim; Egypt
80 kg	Gu Xiaofei; China	Roohallah Rostami; Iran	Mohamed Elelfat; Egypt
88 kg	Abdelkareem Khattab; Jordan	Magomed Dzhamalov; Russian Paralympic Committee	Ye Jixiong; China
97 kg	Hamed Solhipour; Iran	Hany Abdelhady; Egypt	Mutaz Zakaria Daoud Aljuneidi; Jordan
107 kg	Aliakbar Gharibshi; Iran	Enkhbayaryn Sodnompiljee; Mongolia	Saman Razi; Iran
+107 kg	Ahmad Aminzadeh; Iran	Mahdi Sayadi; Iran	Konstantin Matsnev; Russian Paralympic Committee

=== Women ===
Event	Gold	Silver	Bronze
41 kg	Guo Lingling; China	Clara Fuentes Monasterio; Venezuela	Esther Nworgu; Nigeria
45 kg	Cui Zhe; China	Zoe Newson; Great Britain	Marina Beketova; Russian Paralympic Committee
50 kg	Rehab Ahmed; Egypt	Olivia Broome; Great Britain	Lidiia Soloviova; Ukraine
55 kg	Mariana Shevchuk; Ukraine	Besra Duman; Turkey	Tamara Podpalnaya; Russian Paralympic Committee
61 kg	Amalia Pérez; Mexico	Onyinyechi Mark; Nigeria	Cui Jianjin; China
67 kg	Lucy Ejike; Nigeria	Tan Yujiao; China	Fatma Omar; Egypt
73 kg	Xu Lili; China	Mariana D'Andrea; Brazil	Kafila Almaruf; Nigeria
79 kg	Bose Omolayo; Nigeria	Vera Muratova; Russian Paralympic Committee	Han Miaoyu; China
86 kg	Folashade Oluwafemiayo; Nigeria	Zheng Feifei; China	Nataliia Oliinyk; Ukraine
+86 kg	Deng Xuemei; China	Irina Sadovnikova; Russian Paralympic Committee	Perla Bárcenas; Mexico

=== Mixed ===
Event	Gold	Silver	Bronze
Mixed team	Chile	Ukraine	Colombia

=== Junior Men ===
Some events were held but no medals were awarded.

Event	Gold	Silver	Bronze
49 kg	Muslim Al-Sudani; Iraq	Mohammad Alshnaiti; Jordan	Lucas dos Santos; Brazil
54 kg	Thomas Smith; Great Britain	Azizbek Zamirbek Uluu; Kyrgyzstan	Aiaal Sivtsev; Russia
59 kg	Aymen Khodja; Algeria	Zakhar Buimov; Kazakhstan	Dzmitry Khodas; Belarus
65 kg	Mark Swan; Great Britain	Ahmed Al-Karkhi; Iraq	Yerlan Issakov; Kazakhstan
72 kg	Islam Abdulkadirov; Russia	Islam Mohamed; Egypt	Oliver Liddle; Great Britain
80 kg	Saeid Eskandarzadeh; Iran	Not awarded	Not awarded
88 kg	Hassan Elattar; Egypt	Not awarded	Not awarded
+107 kg	Not awarded	Not awarded	Not awarded

=== Junior Women ===
Some events were held but no medals were awarded.

Event	Gold	Silver	Bronze
41 kg	Lara Aparecida de Lima; Brazil	Not awarded	Not awarded
45 kg	Daria Kobylynska; Ukraine	Sandugash Akanova; Kazakhstan	Tayna Rodrigues; Brazil
50 kg	Olivia Broome; Great Britain	Charlotte McGuinness; Great Britain	Zahra Dadashova; Azerbaijan
55 kg	Fabiola Perez; Mexico	Alexandra Penkova; Kazakhstan	Not awarded
61 kg	Fatima Castellanos; Mexico	Not awarded	Not awarded
67 kg	Zlata Diachuk; Ukraine	Not awarded	Not awarded
86 kg	Not awarded	Not awarded	Not awarded
+86 kg	Leyla Karimova; Azerbaijan	Not awarded	Not awarded
