= Guo Lingling =

Chinese Paralympic powerlifter

Personal information
- Born: 18 August 1989 (age 36) Handan, China

Sport
- Country: China
- Sport: Paralympic powerlifting
Medal record
Paralympic Games
Gold medal – first place	2020 Tokyo	41 kg
Gold medal – first place	2024 Paris	45 kg
World Championships
Gold medal – first place	2017 Mexico City	45 kg
Gold medal – first place	2019 Nur-Sultan	45 kg
Gold medal – first place	2021 Tbilisi	41 kg
Gold medal – first place	2023 Dubai	45 kg
Asian Para Games
Gold medal – first place	2018 Jakarta	45 kg
Gold medal – first place	2022 Hangzhou	41 kg

Guo Lingling (born 18 August 1989 in Handan) is a Chinese Paralympic powerlifter. She won the gold medal in the women's 41 kg event at the 2020 Summer Paralympics held in Tokyo, Japan. She also won gold at the 2024 Summer Paralympics held in Paris, France. Guo is a four-time gold medalist at the World Para Powerlifting Championships.

== Career ==
Guo won the gold medal in the women's 45 kg event at both the 2017 World Para Powerlifting Championships and 2019 World Para Powerlifting Championships. She also won the gold medal in the women's 41 kg event at the 2021 World Para Powerlifting Championships.

In 2017, Guo set a new world record of 110 kg at the World Para Powerlifting Championships. At the 2018 World Para Powerlifting Asia-Oceania Open Championships, she improved this world record by lifting 114 kg. At the 2019 World Championships, she set a new world record in the women's 45 kg weight class by lifting 118 kg.

At the 2020 Summer Paralympics held in Tokyo, Japan, Guo won the gold medal in the women's 41 kg event and she set a new world record in this weight class by lifting 109 kg. A few months later, she won the gold medal in her event at the 2021 World Para Powerlifting Championships held in Tbilisi, Georgia. She also improved her world record to 109.5 kg.

Guo won the gold medal in the women's 45 kg event at the 2024 Summer Paralympics held in Paris, France. She also set a new world record of 123 kg.

== Results ==
Year	Venue	Weight	Attempts (kg)				Total	Rank
Year	Venue	Weight	1	2	3	4	Total	Rank
Summer Paralympics
2021	Tokyo, Japan	41 kg	105	~~108~~	108	109; WR PR	108	1st place, gold medalist(s)
World Championships
2017	Mexico City, Mexico	45 kg	107	110 WR	~~116~~	~~116~~	110	1st place, gold medalist(s)
2019	Nur-Sultan, Kazakhstan	45 kg	114	117	118; WR AR	–	118	1st place, gold medalist(s)
2021	Tbilisi, Georgia	41 kg	103	105	~~105~~	109.5 WR	105	1st place, gold medalist(s)
