= Cui Jianjin =

Chinese Paralympic powerlifter

Personal information
- Born: 9 July 1988 (age 37) Heze, China

Sport
- Country: China
- Sport: Paralympic powerlifting
- Weight class: 61 kg
Medal record
Women's paralympic powerlifting
Representing China
Paralympic Games
Silver medal – second place	2024 Paris	61 kg
World Championships
Silver medal – second place	2017 Mexico City	61 kg
Bronze medal – third place	2021 Tbilisi	61 kg
Bronze medal – third place	2023 Dubai	61 kg
Asian Para Games
Gold medal – first place	2010 Guangzhou	60 kg
Gold medal – first place	2018 Jakarta	61 kg
Gold medal – first place	2022 Hangzhou	61 kg

Cui Jianjin (born 9 July 1988) is a Chinese Paralympic powerlifter.

== Career ==
Cui represented China at the 2024 Summer Paralympics and won a silver medal in the 61 kg event.
