= Amir Jafari (powerlifter) =

Iranian Paralympic powerlifter

Personal information
- Nationality: Iranian
- Born: 22 December 1985 (age 40) Tehran
- Weight: 65 kg (143 lb)

Sport
- Sport: Paralympic powerlifting, Bench Press
Medal record
Men's Paralympic powerlifting
Representing Iran
Paralympic Games
Silver medal – second place	2020 Tokyo	65 kg
World Championships
Silver medal – second place	2017 Mexico City	59 kg
Silver medal – second place	2021 Tbilisi	65 kg
Bronze medal – third place	2019 Nur-Sultan	65 kg
Asian Para Games
Gold medal – first place	2014 Incheon	59 kg
Gold medal – first place	2018 Jakarta	59 kg
Silver medal – second place	2022 Hangzhou	65 kg

Amir Jafari (Persian: امیر جعفری ارنگه, born 22 December 1985, in Tehran) is an Iranian Paralympic powerlifter

== Career ==
He won a silver medal at the 2020 Summer Paralympics in 65 kg event. A few months later, he won the silver medal in his event at the 2021 World Para Powerlifting Championships held in Tbilisi, Georgia.

== Major results ==
Year	Venue	Weight	Attempts (kg)				Result (kg)	Rank
Year	Venue	Weight	1	2	3	4	Result (kg)	Rank
Summer Paralympics
2021	Tokyo, Japan	65 kg	195	~~196~~	~~198~~	--	195	2nd place, silver medalist(s)
