= Onyinyechi Mark =

Nigerian Paralympic powerlifter (born 2001)

Personal information
- Born: 5 July 2001 (age 24) Umuahia, Abia State, Nigeria

Sport
- Country: Nigeria
- Sport: powerlifting
- Event: -61kg
Medal record
Women's powerlifting
Representing Nigeria
Summer Paralympics
Gold medal – first place	2024 Paris	–61 kg
World Championships
Gold medal – first place	2023 Dubai	61 kg
Silver medal – second place	2021 Tbilisi	61 kg

Onyinyechi Mark (born 5 July 2001) is a Nigerian powerlifter who competes in the 61 kilograms (134 lb) bracket. She won a gold medal at the 2024 Summer Paralympics in her category. She is also a two-time medalist at the World Para Powerlifting Championships.

== Early life ==
Onyinyechi Mark was born in Umuahia, Abia State on 5 July 2001.

== Career ==
In 2021, Mark won the silver medal in her event at the 2021 World Para Powerlifting Championships held in Tbilisi, Georgia, finishing behind Amalia Pérez. She made her debut at the in 2022 Commonwealth Games in the women's lightweight event, where Mark and compatriot Latifat Tijani were disqualified. In 2023, Mark won the gold medal in her event at the 2023 World Para Powerlifting Championships held in Dubai, United Arab Emirates. Making her Paralympic debut at the 2024 Summer Paralympics held in Paris, she competed in the –61 kg event, where she won her first gold medal and also set a Paralympic and world record in the process.
