= Mohamed Elmenyawy =

Egyptian powerlifter (born 1998)

Personal information
- Born: 10 October 1998 (age 27)

Sport
- Country: Egypt
- Sport: Powerlifting
- Weight class: 59 kg
Medal record
Representing Egypt
Paralympic Games
Gold medal – first place	2024 Paris	59 kg

Mohamed Elmenyawy (born 10 October 1998) is an Egyptian powerlifter. He competed at the 2024 Summer Paralympics and won the gold medal in the men's 59 kg event.
