= Gu Xiaofei =

Chinese Paralympic powerlifter

Personal information
- Born: 14 March 1989 (age 37) Nantong, China

Sport
- Country: China
- Sport: Paralympic powerlifting
Medal record
Paralympic Games
Silver medal – second place	2012 London	82.5 kg
Silver medal – second place	2016 Rio de Janeiro	80 kg
Silver medal – second place	2020 Tokyo	80 kg
Silver medal – second place	2024 Paris	80 kg
World Championships
Gold medal – first place	2014 Dubai	80 kg
Gold medal – first place	2021 Tbilisi	80 kg
Silver medal – second place	2017 Mexico City	80 kg
Silver medal – second place	2019 Nur-Sultan	80 kg
Bronze medal – third place	2010 Kuala Lumpur	82.5 kg
Asian Para Games
Gold medal – first place	2010 Guangzhou	82.5 kg
Gold medal – first place	2018 Jakarta	80 kg
Gold medal – first place	2022 Hangzhou	80 kg

Gu Xiaofei (born 14 March 1989 in Nantong) is a Chinese Paralympic powerlifter. He is a four-time silver medalist at the Summer Paralympics. He is also a five-time medalist, including two gold medals, at the World Para Powerlifting Championships.

== Career ==
He represented China at the Summer Paralympics in 2012, 2016 and 2021 and he won three silver medals: in the men's 82.5 kg event in 2012, in the men's 80 kg event in 2016 and in the men's 80 kg event in 2021.

At the 2017 World Para Powerlifting Championships held in Mexico City, Mexico, he won the silver medal in the men's 80 kg event. Two years later, at the 2019 World Para Powerlifting Championships held in Nur-Sultan, Kazakhstan, he also won the silver medal in the men's 80 kg event. In 2021, he won the gold medal in his event at the 2021 World Para Powerlifting Championships held in Tbilisi, Georgia.
