= Đặng Thị Linh Phượng =

Vietnamese Paralympic powerlifter

Personal information
- Nationality: Vietnamese

Sport
- Sport: Powerlifting
Medal record
Women's powerlifting
Representing Vietnam
Summer Paralympics
Bronze medal – third place	2016 Rio de Janeiro	50 kg
World Championships
Silver medal – second place	2023 Dubai	50 kg
ASEAN Para Games
Gold medal – first place	2017 Kuala Lumpur	50 kg
Asian Para Games
Gold medal – first place	2018 Jakarta	50 kg
Silver medal – second place	2014 Incheon	50 kg
Silver medal – second place	2022 Hangzhou	50 kg

Đặng Thị Linh Phượng is a Vietnamese powerlifter who has competed for her country at the ASEAN Para Games, and the Summer Paralympics.

== Career ==
Đặng Thị Linh Phượng was given up to an orphanage by her parents when she was born without legs. She was adopted by her grandmother, and brought up by her grandmother's housekeeper. Phượng was not sent to school, but was bought schoolbooks by her neighbour and was home-schooled. After finishing school, she began working for a handicraft company near her home. She took up power lifting at the suggestion of a colleague. Phượng found it initially difficult, but persevered and was selected to compete in her city's disabled sports festival.

Phượng was selected as part of the Vietnamese team for the 2016 Summer Paralympics in Rio de Janeiro, Brazil, in powerlifting. Her first lift of 98 kilograms (216 lb) was followed by a second lift of 102 kilograms (225 lb) which placed her second. She failed to lift 104 kilograms (229 lb) in her final attempt, and ended in third place behind Ukraine's Soloviova Lidiia with a Paralympic record lift of 107 kilograms (236 lb) and Egypt's Ahmed Rehab. As a result of her success, she was awarded 20 million Vietnamese đồng by the Vietnamese Minister for Culture, Sports and Tourism, Nguyễn Ngọc Thiện.

At the 2017 ASEAN Para Games, she broke the record in the 50-kg category when she lifted 100 kilograms (220 lb), breaking the previous record of 93 kilograms (205 lb) and winning the gold medal.
