= Enkhbayaryn Sodnompiljee =

Mongolian Paralympic powerlifter

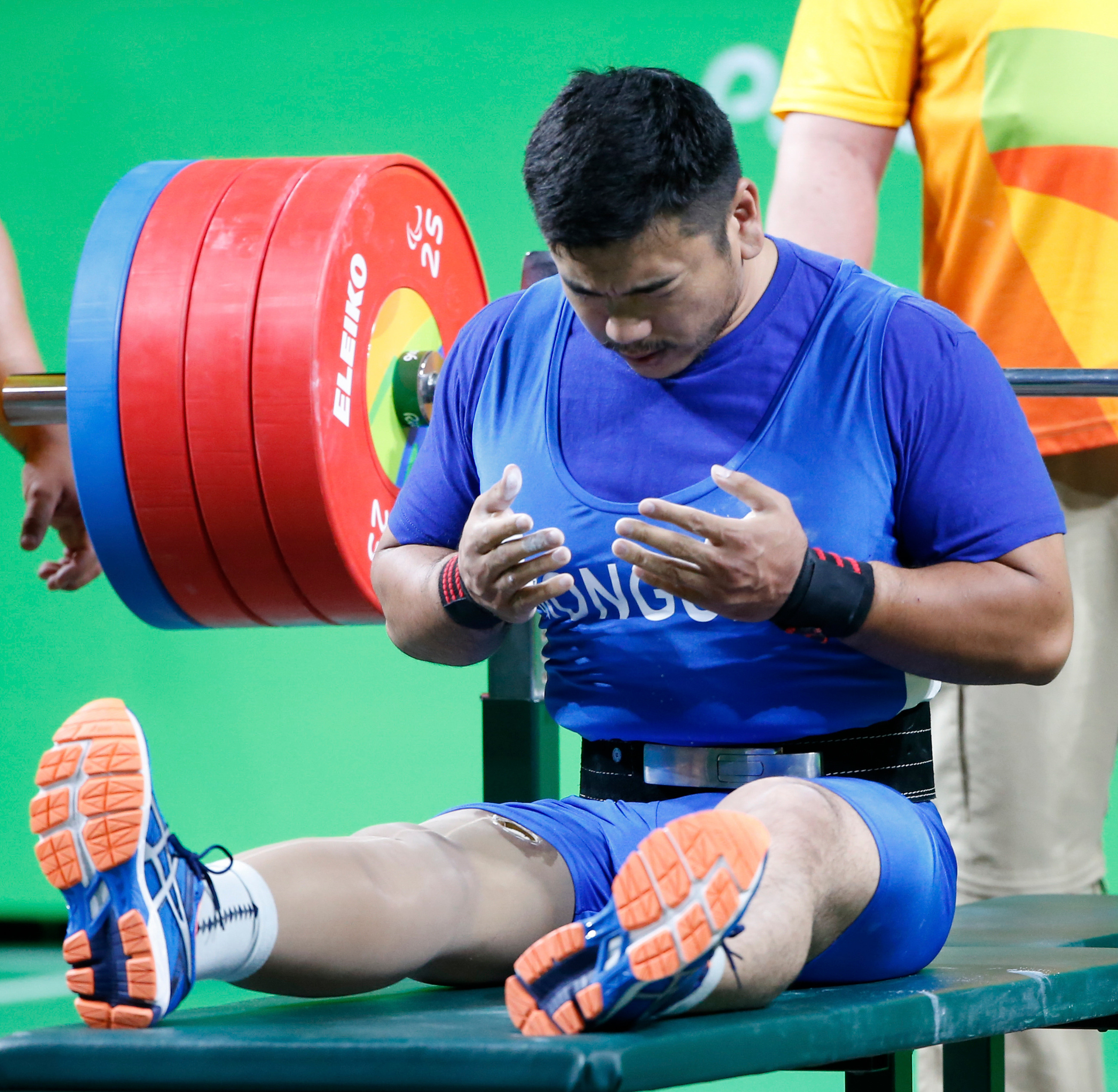

Personal information
- Native name: Энхбаярын Содномпилжээ
- Nationality: Mongolia
- Born: 24 August 1985 (age 41) Ulaanbaatar, Mongolia
- Weight: 107 kg (236 lb)

Sport
- Country: Mongolia
- Sport: Paralympic powerlifting
- Weight class: 107 kg
- Rank: Honored Athlete of Mongolia
- Event: Paralympic
Medal record
Men's Powerlifting
Representing Mongolia
Paralympic Games
Bronze medal – third place	2016 Rio de Janeiro	88 kg
Gold medal – first place	2020 Tokyo	107 kg
Silver medal – second place	2024 Paris	107 kg
World Championships
Silver medal – second place	2017 Mexico	107 kg
Gold medal – first place	2019 Nur-Sultan	107 kg
Silver medal – second place	2021 Tbilisi	107 kg
Asian Para Games
Gold medal – first place	2018 Jakarta	107 kg
Gold medal – first place	2026 Aichi-Nagoya	107 kg
Silver medal – second place	2022 Hangzhou	107 kg
IPF World Classic Bench Press Championships
Gold medal – first place	2018 Vantaa	105 kg
Silver medal – second place	2019 Tokyo	105 kg
Gold medal – first place	2022 Almaty	120 kg
Silver medal – second place	2025 Drammen	120 kg

Enkhbayaryn Sodnompiljee (Mongolian: Энхбаярын Содномпилжээ; born 24 August 1985) is a Mongolian powerlifter. He is a three-time medalist, including gold, at the Paralympic Games.

== Career ==
=== Para Powerlifting ===
Sodnompiljee won the gold medal in paralympic powerlifting in the men's 107 kg event at the 2020 Summer Paralympics held in Tokyo, Japan. Sodnompiljee also represented Mongolia at the 2016 Summer Paralympics held in Rio de Janeiro, Brazil and won the bronze medal in the men's 88 kg event.

At the 2019 World Championships, Sodnompiljee set a new world record of 247 kg in the men's 107 kg category. At the 2017 World Championships, Sodnompiljee won the silver medal in this event.

In 2021, Sodnompiljee won the silver medal in his event at the 2021 World Championships held in Tbilisi, Georgia.

=== IPF World Classic Bench Press Championships ===
At the 2018 IPF World Classic Bench Press Championships, Sodnompiljee bench pressed 242.5 kilograms in the -105 kilogram weight class, claiming the world record, and the gold medal.

The following year, Sodnompilijee bench pressed 247 kilograms in the -105 kilogram weight class, but it was shortly surpassed by Joseph Amendola, who bench pressed 247.5 kilograms. Sodnompilijee won the silver medal.

At the 2022 World Classic Bench Press Championships, Sodnompilijee bench pressed 260 kilograms in the -120 kilogram weight class at the his body weight of 105.7 kg, claiming another world record, and claiming his second gold medal.

At the 2025 World Classic Bench Press Championships, Sodnompilijee bench pressed 250 kilograms for a masters 1 world record in the -120 kilogram weight class, and secured a silver medal.
