= Zheng Feifei =

Chinese Paralympic powerlifter

Personal information
- Born: 8 June 1996 (age 30) Handan, China

Sport
- Country: China
- Sport: Paralympic powerlifting
Medal record
Paralympic Games
Silver medal – second place	2020 Tokyo	86 kg
Silver medal – second place	2024 Paris	86 kg
World Championships
Silver medal – second place	2017 Mexico City	86 kg
Silver medal – second place	2019 Nur-Sultan	86 kg
Silver medal – second place	2021 Tbilisi	86 kg
Asian Para Games
Gold medal – first place	2018 Jakarta	86 kg
Gold medal – first place	2022 Hangzhou	86 kg

Zheng Feifei (born 8 June 1996) is a Chinese Paralympic powerlifter. She is a two-time silver medalist at the Paralympic Games.

== Career ==
She won the silver medal in the women's 86 kg event at the 2020 Summer Paralympics held in Tokyo, Japan. A few months later, she won the silver medal in her event at the 2021 World Para Powerlifting Championships held in Tbilisi, Georgia.
