= Han Miaoyu =

Chinese Paralympic powerlifter

Personal information
- Born: 23 July 1988 (age 37) Shuangyashan, China

Sport
- Country: China
- Sport: Paralympic powerlifting
- Weight class: 79 kg
Medal record
Paralympic Games
Gold medal – first place	2024 Paris	79 kg
World Championships
Gold medal – first place	2019 Nur-Sultan	73 kg
Silver medal – second place	2017 Mexico City	73 kg
Bronze medal – third place	2021 Tbilisi	79 kg
Bronze medal – third place	2023 Dubai	79 kg
Asian Para Games
Gold medal – first place	2022 Hangzhou	79 kg

Han Miaoyu (born 23 July 1988) is a Chinese Paralympic powerlifter. She represented China at the 2024 Summer Paralympics.

== Career ==
In August 2023, she competed at the 2023 World Para Powerlifting Championships and won a bronze medal in the 79 kg event. In October 2023, she then competed at the postponed 2022 Asian Para Games and won a gold medal in the 79 kg event.

Han represented China at the 2024 Summer Paralympics and won a gold medal in the 79 kg event.
