= Yang Jinglang =

Chinese paralympic powerlifter

Personal information
- Born: 24 April 1990 (age 36) Suqian, China

Sport
- Country: China
- Sport: Powerlifting
Medal record
Powerlifting
Representing China
Paralympic Games
Bronze medal – third place	2024 Paris	54 kg
World Championships
Gold medal – first place	2023 Dubai	54 kg
Silver medal – second place	2021 Tbilisi	54 kg
Asian Para Games
Silver medal – second place	2022 Hangzhou	54 kg

Yang Jinglang (born 24 April 1990) is a Chinese paralympic powerlifter. He competed at the 2024 Summer Paralympics, winning the bronze medal in the men's 54 kg event.
