= Aliakbar Gharibshahi =

Iranian paralympic powerlifter

Personal information
- Born: 21 March 1982 (age 44)

Sport
- Country: Iran
- Sport: Para powerlifting
Medal record
Para powerlifting
Representing Iran
Paralympic Games
Gold medal – first place	2024 Paris	107 kg
Asian Para Games
Gold medal – first place	2022 Hangzhou	107 kg
Silver medal – second place	2026 Aichi–Nagoya	107 kg

Aliakbar Gharibshahi (born 21 March 1982) is an Iranian para powerlifter. He represented Iran at the 2024 Summer Paralympics.

== Career ==
Gharibshahi represented Iran at the 2024 Summer Paralympics and won a gold medal in the 107 kg event.

In October 2026, he competed at the 2026 Asian Para Games and won a silver medal in the 107 kg event.
