= Clara Fuentes Monasterio =

Venezuelan-Spanish para-powerlifter

Clara Fuentes
Personal information
- Full name: Clara Sarahy Fuentes Monasterio
- Born: 12 August 1997 (age 28) Caracas, Venezuela

Sport
- Country: Venezuela
- Sport: Paralympic powerlifting
Medal record
Women's paralympic powerlifting
Representing Venezuela
Paralympic Games
Gold medal – first place	2024 Paris	50 kg
Bronze medal – third place	2020 Tokyo	41 kg
World Championships
Silver medal – second place	2021 Tbilisi	41 kg
Parapan American Games
Gold medal – first place	2023 Santiago	45 kg
Bronze medal – third place	2019 Lima	45 kg
South American Para Games
Gold medal – first place	2026 Valledupar	50 kg
Bronze medal – third place	2026 Valledupar	Team
Bronze medal – third place	2026 Valledupar	Mixed team

Clara Sarahy Fuentes Monasterio (born 12 August 1997) is a Venezuelan-born Spanish Paralympic powerlifter. She won bronze in the women's 41 kg at the 2020 Summer Paralympics held in Tokyo, Japan. A few months later, she won the silver medal in her event at the 2021 World Para Powerlifting Championships held in Tbilisi, Georgia.
