= Ahmad Aminzadeh =

Iranian paralympic powerlifter

Personal information
- Native name: احمد امین‌زاده
- Born: March 8, 1991 (age 35) Gotvand, Khuzestan

Sport
- Country: Iran
- Sport: Para powerlifting
Medal record
Para powerlifting
Representing Iran
Paralympic Games
Gold medal – first place	2024 Paris	107 kg
World Championships
Gold medal – first place	2021 Tbilisi	107 kg
Asian Para Games
Gold medal – first place	2022 Hangzhou	107 kg
Gold medal – first place	2026 Aichi–Nagoya	107 kg

Ahmad Aminzadeh (born 8 March 1991) is an Iranian para powerlifter.

== Career ==
He competed at the 2024 Summer Paralympics and won a gold medal in the men's 107 kg event.
