= Rouhollah Rostami =

Iranian Paralympic powerlifter

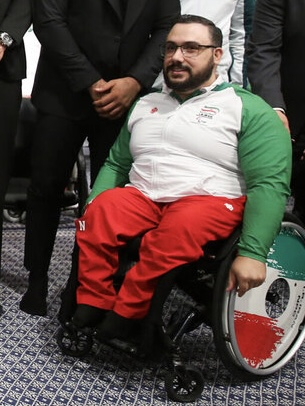
- Rostami in 2024

Personal information
- Nationality: Iranian
- Weight: 79.39 kg (175.0 lb)

Sport
- Sport: Para powerlifting, Bench Press
Medal record
Men's para powerlifting
Representing Iran
Paralympic Games
Gold medal – first place	2020 Tokyo	80 kg
Gold medal – first place	2024 Paris	80 kg
Silver medal – second place	2012 London	67.5 kg
World Championships
Gold medal – first place	2019 Nur-Sultan	80 kg
Silver medal – second place	2014 Dubai	72 kg
Silver medal – second place	2017 Mexico City	72 kg
Silver medal – second place	2021 Tbilisi	80 kg
Asian Para Games
Gold medal – first place	2018 Jakarta	72 kg
Silver medal – second place	2022 Hangzhou	80 kg
Silver medal – second place	2026 Aichi–Nagoya	88 kg

Rouhollah Rostami (Persian: روح‌الله رستمی) is an Iranian powerlifter. He won gold at the Summer Paralympics in 2021 and 2024. At the 2012 Summer Paralympics, he won silver medal in the 67.5 kg (149 lb) category, with 208 kg (459 lb).

== Career ==
In 2021, he won the silver medal in his event at the World Para Powerlifting Championships held in Tbilisi, Georgia.
