= Cui Zhe =

Chinese Paralympic powerlifter

Personal information
- Born: 1 December 1986 (age 39) Heze, China
Medal record
Women's powerlifting
Representing China
Paralympic Games
Gold medal – first place	2024 Paris	–41 kg
Silver medal – second place	2008 Beijing	−40 kg
Silver medal – second place	2012 London	−40 kg
Silver medal – second place	2016 Rio	−41 kg
Silver medal – second place	2020 Tokyo	−45 kg
World Championships
Gold medal – first place	2021 Tbilisi	−45 kg
Gold medal – first place	2023 Dubai	−41 kg
Silver medal – second place	2014 Dubai	−41 kg
Asian Para Games
Gold medal – first place	2010 Guangzhou	44 kg
Gold medal – first place	2014 Incheon	41 kg
Gold medal – first place	2018 Jakarta	−41 kg
Gold medal – first place	2022 Hangzhou	45 kg

Cui Zhe (Chinese: 崔哲, born 1 December 1986 in Heze) is a powerlifter from China. She survived polio at two years old, and began powerlifting in 2003. She won the gold medal in the women's 41 kg event at the 2024 Summer Paralympics held in Paris, France.

== Career ==
Chi Zhe made her international debut at the 2005 Asian Weightlifting Championships. At the 2012 Summer Paralympics she won a silver medal in the women's 40 kg powerlifting event, lifting 97 kg (214 lb).

She also won the silver medal in the women's 45 kg event at the 2020 Summer Paralympics held in Tokyo, Japan. A few months later, she won the gold medal in her event at the 2021 World Para Powerlifting Championships held in Tbilisi, Georgia.

Cui is featured in the 2020 documentary film Rising Phoenix.
