= Jordan at the Paralympics =

- IPC code: JOR
- NPC: Jordan Paralympic Committee
- Medals Ranked 68th: Gold 7 Silver 7 Bronze 8 Total 22

Summer appearances
- 1984; 1988; 1992; 1996; 2000; 2004; 2008; 2012; 2016; 2020; 2024

Jordan first participated at the Paralympic Games in 1984, and has sent athletes to compete in every Summer Paralympic Games since then, with the exception of the 1992 Summer Paralympics. The nation has never participated in the Winter Paralympic Games.

== Games ==
Competition	Gold	Silver	Bronze	Total
(United States) / (United Kingdom) 1984 New York/Stoke Mandeville	0	1	2	3
(South Korea) 1988 Seoul	0	0	0	0
(Spain) 1992 Barcelona	0	0	0	0
(United States) 1996 Atlanta	0	1	0	1
(Australia) 2000 Sydney	1	0	0	1
(Greece) 2004 Athens	0	1	1	2
(China) 2008 Beijing	0	2	2	4
(United Kingdom) 2012 London	0	0	0	0
(Brazil) 2016 Rio de Janeiro	0	2	1	3
(Japan) 2020 Tokyo	4	0	1	5
(France) 2024 Paris	2	0	1	3
Total medals	7	7	8	22

== Medals by Summer Sport ==
Sport	Gold	Silver	Bronze	Total
Powerlifting	5	3	2	10
Athletics	1	4	3	8
Table tennis	1	0	3	4
Totals (3 entries)	7	7	8	22

== Medallists ==
Medal	Name	Games	Sport	Event
Silver	Maha Al-Bargouti	1984 Stoke Mandeville/New York City	Athletics	Women's shot put 1A
Bronze	Aida Sheshani	1984 Stoke Mandeville/New York City	Athletics	Women's 100m 1B
Bronze	Aida Sheshani	1984 Stoke Mandeville/New York City	Athletics	Women's 200m 1B
Silver	Imad Gharbawi	1996 Atlanta	Athletics	Men's discus F52
Gold	Maha Al-Bargouti	2000 Sydney	Table tennis	Women's singles C1-2
Silver	Jamil Elshebli	2004 Athens	Athletics	Men's shot put F57
Bronze	Khetam Abuawad; Maha Al-Bargouti; Fatemah Al-Azzam	2004 Athens	Table tennis	Women's teams C4-5
Silver	Jamil Elshebli	2008 Beijing	Athletics	Men's shot put F57/58
Silver	Omar Qarada	2008 Beijing	Powerlifting	Men's -48 kg
Bronze	Mu'taz Aljuneidi	2008 Beijing	Powerlifting	Men's -75 kg
Bronze	Khetam Abuawad; Fatmeh Al-Azzam	2008 Beijing	Table tennis	Women's teams C4-5
Silver	Omar Qarada	2016 Rio de Janeiro	Powerlifting	Men's -49 kg
Silver	Tharwat Alhajjaj	2016 Rio de Janeiro	Powerlifting	Women's -86 kg
Bronze	Jamil Elshebli	2016 Rio de Janeiro	Powerlifting	Men's +107 kg
Gold	Omar Qarada	2020 Tokyo	Powerlifting	Men's 49 kg
Gold	Abdelkareem Khattab	2020 Tokyo	Powerlifting	Men's 88 kg
Gold	Jamil Elshebli	2020 Tokyo	Powerlifting	Men's +107 kg
Gold	Ahmad Hindi	2020 Tokyo	Athletics	Men's shot put F34
Bronze	Khetam Abuawad	2020 Tokyo	Table tennis	Women's singles C5
Gold	Omar Sami Hamadeh Qarada	2024 Paris	Powerlifting	Men's -49 kg
Gold	Abdelkareem Khattab	2024 Paris	Powerlifting	Men's -97 kg
Bronze	Ahmad Hindi	2024 Paris	Athletics	Men's shot put F34
