= Jordan at the 2016 Summer Paralympics =

- IPC code: JOR
- NPC: Jordan Paralympic Committee

in Rio de Janeiro
- Competitors: 10 in 3 sports
- Medals Ranked 66th: Gold 0 Silver 2 Bronze 1 Total 3

Summer Paralympics appearances (overview)
- 1984; 1988; 1992; 1996; 2000; 2004; 2008; 2012; 2016; 2020; 2024

Jordan competed at the 2016 Summer Paralympics in Rio de Janeiro, Brazil, from 7 September to 18 September 2016.

== Disability classifications ==
Every participant at the Paralympics has their disability grouped into one of five disability categories; amputation, the condition may be congenital or sustained through injury or illness; cerebral palsy; wheelchair athletes, there is often overlap between this and other categories; visual impairment, including blindness; Les autres, any physical disability that does not fall strictly under one of the other categories, for example dwarfism or multiple sclerosis. Each Paralympic sport then has its own classifications, dependent upon the specific physical demands of competition. Events are given a code, made of numbers and letters, describing the type of event and classification of the athletes competing. Some sports, such as athletics, divide athletes by both the category and severity of their disabilities, other sports, for example swimming, group competitors from different categories together, the only separation being based on the severity of the disability.

== Medallists ==
Medal	Name	Sport	Event	Date
Silver	Omar Qarada	Powerlifting	Men's 49 kg	8 September
Silver	Tharwat Alhajjaj	Powerlifting	Women's 86 kg	13 September
Bronze	Jamil Elshebli	Powerlifting	Men's +107 kg	14 September

== Athletics ==
Men's Track

Athlete	Events	Heat		Final	
Athlete	Events	Time	Rank	Time	Rank
Bilal Saada	400 m T45-47	50.42	4	did not advance	

== Powerlifting ==
Athlete	Event	Result	Rank
Omar Qarada	Men's −49 kg	177	2nd place, silver medalist(s)
Abdelkareem Khattab	Men's −72 kg	No Mark	
Mutaz Aljuneidi	Men's −88 kg	190	7
Haidarah Alkawamleh	Men's −107 kg	204	5
Jamil Elshebli	Men's +107 kg	234	3rd place, bronze medalist(s)
Tharwat Alhajjaj	Women's −86 kg	119	2nd place, silver medalist(s)

== Table Tennis ==
Men

Athlete	Event	Group Matches			Round of 16	Quarterfinals	Semifinals	Final / BM	
Athlete	Event	Opposition Result	Opposition Result	Rank	Opposition Result	Opposition Result	Opposition Result	Opposition Result	Rank
Asama Abu Jame	Singles class 3	Bruchle (GER); L 1–3	Jeyong (KOR); W 3–2	2 Q	Schmidberger (GER); L 0–3	did not advance			

Women

Athlete	Event	Group Matches			Quarterfinals	Semifinals	Final / BM	
Athlete	Event	Opposition Result	Opposition Result	Rank	Opposition Result	Opposition Result	Opposition Result	Rank
Maha Bargouthi	Singles class 1-2	Liu (CHN); L 0–3	McCarron (IRL); L 0–3	3	did not advance			
Khetam Abuawad	Singles class 5	Paredes (MEX); W 3–0	Tabib (ISR); W 3–0	1 Q	Lundbaeck (SWE); L 0–3	did not advance		

Teams

Athlete	Event	Round of 16	Quarterfinals	Semifinals	Final / BM	
Athlete	Event	Opposition Result	Opposition Result	Opposition Result	Opposition Result	Rank
Khetam Abuawad; Maha Bargouthi	Women's Team class 4–5	Mexico (MEX); L 1–2	did not advance			

== See also ==
- Jordan at the 2016 Summer Olympics
