= Table tennis at the 2012 Summer Paralympics – Women's individual – Class 1–2 =

Table tennis Women's C1-2 at the XIV Paralympic Games
- Venue: ExCeL Exhibition Centre
- Dates: 30 August – 2 September 2012
- Competitors: 12 from 9 nations

Medalists
1st place, gold medalist(s)		Liu Jing	China
2nd place, silver medalist(s)		Pamela Pezzutto	Italy
3rd place, bronze medalist(s)		Isabelle Lafaye Marziou	France

The Women's individual table tennis – Class 1–2 tournament at the 2012 Summer Paralympics in London took place from 30 August to 2 September 2012 at ExCeL Exhibition Centre. Classes 1–5 are for athletes with a physical impairment that affected their legs, and who compete in a sitting position. The lower the number, the greater the impact the impairment was on an athlete's ability to compete.

In the preliminary stage, athletes competed in four groups of three. Winners of each group qualified for the semi-finals.

== Results ==
All times are local (BST/UTC+1)

=== Finals ===
Semifinals: 1 Sep 16:00
A1	Liu Jing (CHN)	11	11	10	11
C1	Isabelle Lafaye Marziou (FRA)	9	9	12	5
D1	Nadezda Pushpasheva (RUS)	6	1	4
B1	Pamela Pezzutto (ITA)	11	11	11

Gold-medal match: 2 Sep 11:45
A1	Liu Jing (CHN)	11	11	11
B1	Pamela Pezzutto (ITA)	8	8	5
Bronze-medal match
C1	Isabelle Lafaye Marziou (FRA)	8	11	11	6	13
D1	Nadezda Pushpasheva (RUS)	11	5	3	11	11

=== Preliminary round ===
Qualified for the semifinals

==== Group A ====
Athlete	Won	Lost	Games won	Points diff
Liu Jing (CHN)	2	0	6	+23
Clara Podda (ITA)	1	1	4	+2
Tara Profitt (USA)	0	2	0	-25

30 August, 13:00

Liu Jing (CHN)	11	11	11
Tara Profitt (USA)	5	7	5

31 August, 11:40

Tara Profitt (USA)	9	9	6
Clara Podda (ITA)	11	11	11

31 August, 19:20

Liu Jing (CHN)	11	11	11	11
Clara Podda (ITA)	7	8	13	9

==== Group B ====
Athlete	Won	Lost	Games won	Points diff
Pamela Pezzutto (ITA)	2	0	6	+28
Florence Sireau (FRA)	1	1	5	-6
Eimear Breathnach (IRL)	0	2	2	-22

30 August, 13:00

Pamela Pezzutto (ITA)	11	11	11
Eimear Breathnach (IRL)	3	7	8

31 August, 11:40

Eimear Breathnach (IRL)	14	6	11	10	3
Florence Sireau (FRA)	12	11	5	12	11

31 August, 19:20

Pamela Pezzutto (ITA)	11	9	11	9	11
Florence Sireau (FRA)	7	11	5	11	4

==== Group C ====
Athlete	Won	Lost	Games won	Points diff
Nadezda Pushpasheva (RUS)	2	0	6	+18
Wachirapond Maenpuak (THA)	1	1	4	+10
Dorota Bucław (POL)	0	2	0	-28

30 August, 13:00

Nadezda Pushpasheva (RUS)	12	11	9	11
Wachirapond Maenpuak (THA)	10	8	11	6

31 August, 11:40

Wachirapond Maenpuak (THA)	11	11	11
Dorota Bucław (POL)	6	5	4

31 August, 19:20

Nadezda Pushpasheva (RUS)	12	11	11
Dorota Bucław (POL)	10	7	7

==== Group D ====
Athlete	Won	Lost	Games won	Points diff
Isabelle Lafaye Marziou (FRA)	2	0	6	+20
Rena McCarron Rooney (IRL)	1	1	4	+2
Maha Bargouthi (JOR)	0	2	2	-22

30 August, 13:00

Isabelle Lafaye Marziou (FRA)	11	11	8	11
Rena McCarron Rooney (IRL)	5	9	11	8

31 August, 11:40

Rena McCarron Rooney (IRL)	10	12	11	11	11
Maha Bargouthi (JOR)	12	14	7	3	9

31 August, 19:20

Isabelle Lafaye Marziou (FRA)	11	11	11
Maha Bargouthi (JOR)	9	5	7
