= Table tennis at the 2008 Summer Paralympics – Women's individual – Class 1–2 =

Women's Individual Class 1-2 at the XIII Paralympic Games
- Venue: Peking University Gymnasium
- Dates: 7 – 11 September 2008
- Competitors: 12 from 8 nations

Medalists
1st place, gold medalist(s)		Liu Jing	China
2nd place, silver medalist(s)		Pamela Pezzutto	Italy
3rd place, bronze medalist(s)		Clara Podda	Italy

The Women's Individual Class 1-2 table tennis competition at the 2008 Summer Paralympics was held between 7 September and 11 September at the Peking University Gymnasium.

Classes 1-5 were for athletes with a physical impairment that affected their legs, who competed in a sitting position. The lower the number, the greater the impact the impairment was on an athlete’s ability to compete.

The event was won by Liu Jing, representing China.

== Results ==
=== Preliminary round ===
Qualified for the knock-out stages

==== Group A ====
Rank	Competitor	MP	W	L	Points	ITA	FRA	GBR
1	Clara Podda (ITA)	2	2	0	6:3	x	3:1	3:2
2	Genevieve Clot (FRA)	2	1	1	4:3	1:3	x	3:0
3	Dzaier Neil (GBR)	2	0	2	2:6	2:3	0:3	x

7 September, 16:00: Clara Podda (ITA) / 11 / 11 / 6 / 11 / 11; Dzaier Neil (GBR) / 4 / 13 / 11 / 3 / 9	8 September, 11:20: Genevieve Clot (FRA) / 11 / 16 / 12; Dzaier Neil (GBR) / 8 / 14 / 10	8 September, 18:40: Clara Podda (ITA) / 11 / 4 / 11 / 11; Genevieve Clot (FRA) / 9 / 11 / 5 / 7

==== Group B ====
Rank	Competitor	MP	W	L	Points	FRA	IRI	JOR
1	Isabelle Lafaye (FRA)	2	2	0	6:2	x	3:1	3:1
2	Narges Khazaei (IRI)	2	1	1	4:5	1:3	x	3:2
3	Maha Bargouthi (JOR)	2	0	2	3:6	1:3	2:3	x

7 September, 16:00: Isabelle Lafaye (FRA) / 11 / 11 / 10 / 11; Narges Khazaei (IRI) / 5 / 4 / 12 / 9	8 September, 11:20: Narges Khazaei (IRI) / 11 / 7 / 11 / 7 / 11; Maha Bargouthi (JOR) / 6 / 11 / 9 / 11 / 9	8 September, 18:40: Isabelle Lafaye (FRA) / 11 / 11 / 15 / 11; Maha Bargouthi (JOR) / 4 / 5 / 17 / 1

==== Group C ====
Rank	Competitor	MP	W	L	Points	CHN	GBR	FRA
1	Liu Jing (CHN)	2	2	0	6:1	x	3:1	3:0
2	Cathy Mitton (GBR)	2	1	1	4:4	1:3	x	3:1
3	Florence Sireau-Gossiaux (FRA)	2	0	2	1:6	0:3	1:3	x

7 September, 16:00: Liu Jing (CHN) / 11 / 11 / 11; Florence Sireau-Gossiaux (FRA) / 8 / 8 / 4	8 September, 11:20: Cathy Mitton (GBR) / 11 / 3 / 11 / 11; Florence Sireau-Gossiaux (FRA) / 5 / 11 / 3 / 6	8 September, 18:40: Liu Jing (CHN) / 11 / 11 / 8 / 11; Cathy Mitton (GBR) / 9 / 5 / 11 / 6

==== Group D ====
Rank	Competitor	MP	W	L	Points	ITA	RUS	IRL
1	Pamela Pezzutto (ITA)	2	2	0	6:2	x	3:1	3:1
2	Nadezda Pushpasheva (RUS)	2	1	1	4:4	1:3	x	3:1
3	Eimear Breathnach (IRL)	2	0	2	2:6	1:3	1:3	x

7 September, 16:00: Nadezda Pushpasheva (RUS) / 11 / 9 / 11 / 11; Eimear Breathnach (IRL) / 6 / 11 / 5 / 7	8 September, 11:20: Pamela Pezzutto (ITA) / 11 / 11 / 10 / 11; Eimear Breathnach (IRL) / 4 / 7 / 12 / 6	8 September, 18:40: Pamela Pezzutto (ITA) / 11 / 5 / 13 / 11; Nadezda Pushpasheva (RUS) / 8 / 11 / 11 / 8

=== Competition bracket ===
Semifinals: 10 Sep 10:45
Clara Podda (ITA)	11	6	14	11
Liu Jing (CHN)	13	11	12	13
Pamela Pezzutto (ITA)	12	11	18	7	11
Isabelle Lafaye (FRA)	10	9	20	11	6

Gold medal match: 10 Sep 16:00
Liu Jing (CHN)	11	9	11	11
Pamela Pezzutto (ITA)	3	11	5	6
Bronze medal match: 10 Sep 16:00
Clara Podda (ITA)	9	11	11	11
Isabelle Lafaye (FRA)	11	9	3	8
