= Jordan at the 2004 Summer Paralympics =

- IPC code: JOR
- NPC: Jordan Paralympic Committee

in Athens
- Competitors: 10 in 2 sports
- Medals Ranked 64th: Gold 0 Silver 1 Bronze 1 Total 2

Summer Paralympics appearances (overview)
- 1984; 1988; 1992; 1996; 2000; 2004; 2008; 2012; 2016; 2020; 2024

Jordan competed at the 2004 Summer Paralympics in Athens, Greece. The team included 10 athletes, 5 men and 5 women. Competitors from Jordan won 2 medals, including 1 silver and 1 bronze to finish 64th in the medal table.

== Medallists ==
Medal	Name	Sport	Event
Silver	Jamil Elshebli	Athletics	Men's shot put F57
Bronze	Khetam Abuawad; Maha Al Bargouti; Fatemah Al Azzam	Table tennis	Women's teams class 4-5

== Sports ==
=== Athletics ===
==== Men's field ====
Athlete	Class	Event	Final		
Athlete	Class	Event	Result	Points	Rank
Amer Al Abbadi	F58	Shot put	13.80	-	4
Jamil Elshebli	F57	Shot put	13.19	-	2nd place, silver medalist(s)

=== Powerlifting ===
==== Men ====
Athlete	Event	Result	Rank
Mutaz Al Juneidi	82.5kg	185.0	10
Haidarah Alkawamleh	100kg	187.5	10

==== Women ====
Athlete	Event	Result	Rank
Fatama Allawi	52kg	80.0	6

=== Table tennis ===
==== Men ====
Athlete	Event	Preliminaries				Quarterfinals	Semifinals	Final / BM	
Athlete	Event	Opposition Result	Opposition Result	Opposition Result	Rank	Opposition Result	Opposition Result	Opposition Result	Rank
Imad Ibrahim Khalil	Men's singles 10	de la Bourdonnaye (FRA); L 0–3	Vrbka (CZE); L 0–3	Vivanco (MEX); L 0–3	4	did not advance			

==== Women ====
Athlete	Event	Preliminaries			Quarterfinals	Semifinals	Final / BM	
Athlete	Event	Opposition Result	Opposition Result	Rank	Opposition Result	Opposition Result	Opposition Result	Rank
Khetam Abuawad	Women's singles 5	Ren G X (CHN); L 0-3	Wei M H (TPE); L 0-3	3	did not advance			
Maha Al Bargouti	Women's singles 1-2	Clot (FRA); L 0–3	Mitton (GBR); L 1–3	3	did not advance			
Fatemah Al Azzam	Women's singles 4	Weinmann (GER); L 2-3	Gilroy (GBR); W 3-1	2 Q	Pape (GER); L 0-3	did not advance		
Khetam Abuawad; Maha Al Bargouti; Fatemah Al Azzam	Women's team 4-5	Chinese Taipei (TPE); L 0-3	Germany (GER); W 3-2	2 Q	Slovakia (SVK); W 3-2	China (CHN); L 0-3	France (FRA); W 3-1	3rd place, bronze medalist(s)

== See also ==
- Jordan at the Paralympics
- Jordan at the 2004 Summer Olympics
