= Table tennis at the 2004 Summer Paralympics – Women's individual – Class 1–2 =

Table Tennis - Women's Singles 1-2 at the XII Paralympic Games
- Paralympic Table Tennis
- Venue: Galatsi Olympic Hall
- Dates: 18–21 September 2004
- Competitors: 7 from 5 nations

Medalists
1st place, gold medalist(s)		Isabelle Lafaye Marziou	France
2nd place, silver medalist(s)		Genevieve Clot	France
3rd place, bronze medalist(s)		Catherine Mitton	Great Britain

The Women's Singles 1-2 table tennis competition at the 2004 Summer Paralympics was held from 18 to 21 September at the Galatsi Olympic Hall.

Classes 1-5 were for athletes with a physical impairment that affected their legs, who competed in a sitting position. The lower the number, the greater the impact the impairment was on an athlete's ability to compete.

The event was won by Isabelle Lafaye Marziou, representing France.

== Results ==
=== Preliminaries ===
Qualified for final round

==== Group A ====
Rank	Competitor	MP	W	L	Points	FRA	GBR	JOR
1	Genevieve Clot (FRA)	2	2	0	6:1	x	3:1	3:0
2	Catherine Mitton (GBR)	2	1	1	4:4	1:3	x	3:1
3	Maha Al Bargouti (JOR)	2	0	2	1:6	0:3	1:3	x

==== Group B ====
Rank	Competitor	MP	W	L	Points	FRA	ITA	GBR	MEX
1	Isabelle Lafaye Marziou (FRA)	3	3	0	9:1	x	3:1	3:0	3:0
2	Clara Podda (ITA)	3	2	1	7:4	1:3	x	3:1	3:0
3	Lynne Riding (GBR)	3	1	2	4:6	0:3	1:3	x	3:0
4	Isabel Garcia Ble (MEX)	3	0	3	0:9	0:3	0:3	0:3	x

=== Competition bracket ===
Semi-finals
Genevieve Clot (FRA)	3
Clara Podda (ITA)	1
Catherine Mitton (GBR)	1
Isabelle Lafaye Marziou (FRA)	3

Final
Genevieve Clot (FRA)	1
Isabelle Lafaye Marziou (FRA)	3
Third place
Clara Podda (ITA)	0
Catherine Mitton (GBR)	3
