= Jordan at the 2020 Summer Paralympics =

- IPC code: JOR
- NPC: Jordan Paralympic Committee

in Tokyo
- Competitors: 10 in 3 sports
- Medals: Gold 4 Silver 0 Bronze 1 Total 5

Summer Paralympics appearances (overview)
- 1984; 1988; 1992; 1996; 2000; 2004; 2008; 2012; 2016; 2020; 2024

Jordan competed at the 2020 Summer Paralympics in Tokyo, Japan, from 24 August to 5 September 2021.

== Medalists ==
Medal	Name	Sport	Event	Date
Gold	Omar Qarada	Powerlifting	Men's 49 kg	26 August
Gold	Abdelkareem Khattab	Powerlifting	Men's 88 kg	29 August
Gold	Jamil Elshebli	Powerlifting	Men's +107 kg	30 August
Gold	Ahmad Hindi	Athletics	Men's shot put F34	4 September
Bronze	Khetam Abuawad	Table tennis	Women's individual class 5	28 August

== Competitors ==
Sport	Men	Women	Total
Athletics	1	0	1
Powerlifting	5	2	7
Table tennis	0	2	2
Total	6	4	10

== Athletics ==
One Jordanian male athlete, Ahmad Hindi (Shot Put F34), successfully to break through the qualifications for the 2020 Paralympics after breaking the qualification limit.

== Powerlifting ==
Number	Athlete	Event	Result	Rank
Men
1	Omar Qarada	Men's 49 kg	173	1st place, gold medalist(s)
2	Mohammad Tarbash	Men's 65 kg	NM	-
3	Abdelkareem Khattab	Men's 88 kg	231	1st place, gold medalist(s)
4	Mutaz Zakaria Daoud Aljuneidi	Men's 97 kg	215	4
5	Jamil Elshebli	Men's +107 kg	241	1st place, gold medalist(s)
Women
6	Asma Issa	Women's 79 kg	115	4
7	Tharwat Alhajjaj	Women's 86 kg	NM	-

== Table tennis ==
Jordan entered one athletes into the table tennis competition at the games. Khetam Abuawad qualified via World Ranking allocation.

Women

Athlete	Event	Group Stage			Round 1	Quarterfinals	Semifinals	Final	
Athlete	Event	Opposition Result	Opposition Result	Rank	Opposition Result	Opposition Result	Opposition Result	Opposition Result	Rank
Khetam Abuawad	Individual C5	Tabib (ISR); L (1-3)	Sringam (THA); W (3-0)	1					

== See also ==
- Jordan at the Paralympics
- Jordan at the 2020 Summer Olympics
