= Jordan at the 2012 Summer Paralympics =

- IPC code: JOR
- NPC: Jordan Paralympic Committee

in London
- Competitors: 8 in 3 sports
- Medals: Gold 0 Silver 0 Bronze 0 Total 0

Summer Paralympics appearances (overview)
- 1984; 1988; 1992; 1996; 2000; 2004; 2008; 2012; 2016; 2020; 2024

Jordan competed at the 2012 Summer Paralympics in London, United Kingdom from 29 August to 9 September 2012.

Three members of the Jordanian team, two athletes and a trainer, were arrested after four women in Northern Ireland filed complaints alleging sexual assault by the men. They were released on bail after an embassy official promised they would be returned to face sexual assault charges. The three men, two powerlifters and a trainer were subsequently withdrawn from the team. One, powerlifter Omar Qaradhi, later pleaded guilty to sexual assault, and received a twelve-month suspended sentence.

== Athletics ==
Men’s Field Events

Athlete	Event	Distance	Points	Rank
Amer Al Abbadi	Shot Put F57-58	12.93	758	11
Amer Al Abbadi	Discus Throw F57-58	41.32	657	14
Abed Al Ramahi	Long Jump F13	5.66	—N/a	11
Jamil Elshebli	Shot Put F57-58	13.58	954	4

== Powerlifting ==
Men

Athlete	Event	Result	Rank
Haidarah Alkawamleh	+100kg	215	7

Women

Athlete	Event	Result	Rank
Fatama Allawi	-52kg	85	6

== Table tennis ==
Women

Athlete	Event	Group Stage			Round of 16	Quarterfinals	Semifinals	Final	
Athlete	Event	Opposition Result	Opposition Result	Rank	Opposition Result	Opposition Result	Opposition Result	Opposition Result	Rank
Maha Bargouthi	Individual C1-2	Rooney (IRL); L 2-3	Marziou (FRA); L 0-3	3	—N/a		did not advance		
Fatmeh Al-Azzam	Individual C4	Peric-Rankovic (SRB); L 0-3	Jung (KOR); W 3-0	2	—N/a		did not advance		
Khetam Abuawad	Individual C5	Makishi (ARG); W 3-0	Bessho (JPN); W 3-0	1 Q	—N/a		Gu (CHN); L 1-3	Bronze Medal Match; Lundback (SWE); L 2-3	4
Maha Bargouthi; Fatmeh Al-Azzam; Khetam Abuawad	Team C4-5	—N/a			Bye	Sweden (SWE); L 0-3	did not advance		

== See also ==
- Jordan at the 2012 Summer Olympics
