= Table tennis at the 2024 Summer Paralympics – Women's doubles WD5 =

Women's doubles WD5 at the XVII Paralympic Games
- Venue: South Paris Arena 4, Paris
- Dates: 29 – 30 August 2024
- Competitors: 14 from 6 nations

Medalists
1st place, gold medalist(s)		Liu Jing; Xue Juan	China
2nd place, silver medalist(s)		Seo Su-yeon; Yoon Ji-yu	South Korea
3rd place, bronze medalist(s)		Cátia Oliveira; Joyce de Oliveira	Brazil
3rd place, bronze medalist(s)		Dararat Asayut; Chilchitparyak Bootwansirina	Thailand

The women's doubles – Class 5 tournament at the 2024 Summer Paralympics in Paris will take place between 29 and 30 August 2024 at South Paris Arena 4.

== Schedule ==
The schedule are as below:

¼	Quarter-finals	½	Semi-finals	G	Gold medal match

Events	Dates			
Events	Thu 29 Aug		Fri 30 Aug	
Events	M	E	M	E
Women's doubles WD5	¼		½	G

== Results ==
Quarter-finals
7	Fawzia Elshamy (EGY); Ola Soliman (EGY)	1	7	4
3	Cátia Oliveira (BRA); Joyce Oliveira (BRA)	11	11	11
4	Liu Jing (CHN); Xue Juan (CHN)	11	11	11
6	Carla Maia Limp de Azevedo (BRA); Marliane Amaral Santos (BRA)	5	4	2
5	Dararat Asayut (THA); Chilchitparyak Bootwansirina (THA)	7	11	11	11
2	Michela Brunelli (ITA); Giada Rossi (ITA)	11	9	8	8

Semi-finals
1	Seo Su-yeon (KOR); Yoon Ji-yu (KOR)	11	11	13
3	Cátia Oliveira (BRA); Joyce de Oliveira (BRA)	6	9	11
4	Liu Jing (CHN); Xue Juan (CHN)	9	13	12	11
5	Dararat Asayut (THA); Chilchitparyak Bootwansirina (THA)	11	11	10	7

Gold medal match
1	Seo Su-yeon (KOR); Yoon Ji-yu (KOR)	7	7	11	9
4	Liu Jing (CHN); Xue Juan (CHN)	11	11	8	11
