= Powerlifting at the 2016 Summer Paralympics – Men's 88 kg =

Powerlifting – Men's 88 kg at the XV Paralympic Games
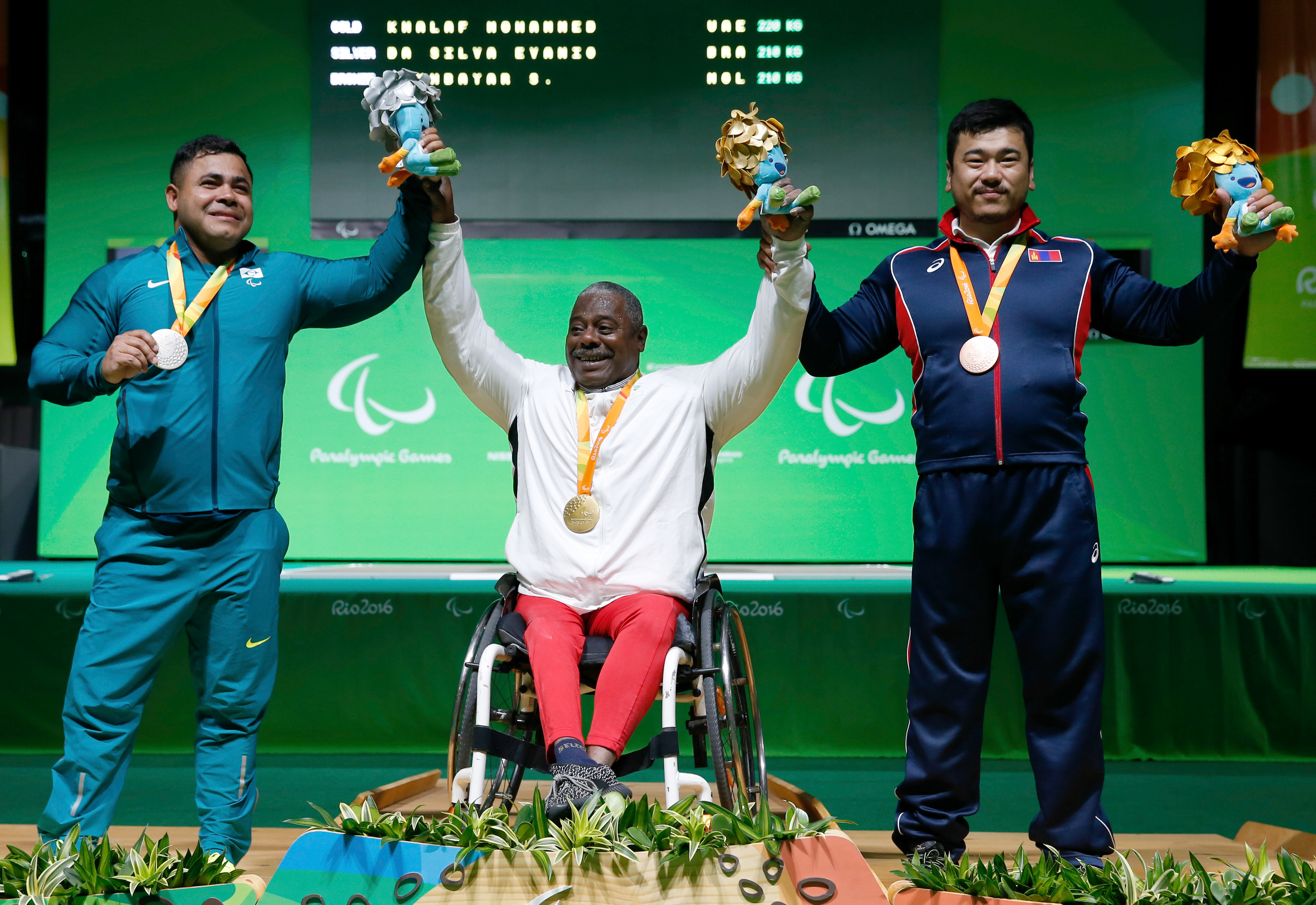
- Left-right: Silva, Khalaf, Enkhbayar
- Venue: Riocentro
- Date: 13 September 2016
- Competitors: 10 from 10 nations
- Winning lift: 220.0 kg

Medalists
1st place, gold medalist(s)		Mohammed Khamis Khalaf	United Arab Emirates
2nd place, silver medalist(s)		Evânio da Silva	Brazil
3rd place, bronze medalist(s)		Sodnompiljee Enkhbayar	Mongolia

The men's 88 kg powerlifting event at the 2016 Summer Paralympics was contested on 13 September at Riocentro.

== Records ==
There are twenty powerlifting events, corresponding to ten weight classes each for men and women. The weight categories were significantly adjusted after the 2012 Games so most of the weights are new for 2016. As a result, no Paralympic record was available for this weight class prior to the competition. The existing world records were as follows.

Record Type	Weight	Country	Venue	Date
World record	233 kg	Hany Abdelhady (EGY)	Dubai	18 February 2016
Paralympic record	225 kg	Standard	–	–

== Results ==
Rank	Name	Body weight (kg)	Attempts (kg)				Result (kg)
Rank	Name	Body weight (kg)	1	2	3	4	Result (kg)
1st place, gold medalist(s)	Mohammed Khamis Khalaf (UAE)	86.31	212.0	220.0	~~226.0~~	–	220.0
2nd place, silver medalist(s)	Evânio da Silva (BRA)	86.35	205.0	210.0	~~215.0~~	–	210.0
3rd place, bronze medalist(s)	Sodnompiljee Enkhbayar (MGL)	87.53	210.0	~~217.0~~	~~217.0~~	–	210.0
4	Jesus Oniger Drake Vega (CUB)	86.58	~~198.0~~	200.0	205	–	205.0
5	Opeyemi Jegede (NGR)	84.8	192	200.0	~~215.0~~	–	200.0
6	Hany Abdelhady (EGY)	87.68	180	200.0	~~215.0~~	–	200.0
7	Mutaz Zakaria Aljuneidi (JOR)	87.67	~~190.0~~	190.0	~~200.0~~	–	190.0
8	Odo Hideki (JPN)	84.62	160.0	~~170.0~~	~~170.0~~	–	160.0
–	Ye Jixiong (CHN)	84.62	~~224.0~~	~~226.0~~	~~226.0~~	–	NMR
–	Seyedhamed Solhipouravanji (IRN)	86.95	~~225.0~~	~~225.0~~	~~225.0~~	–	NMR
