= Jordan at the 2008 Summer Paralympics =

- IPC code: JOR
- NPC: Jordan Paralympic Committee

in Beijing
- Competitors: 12 in 3 sports
- Medals Ranked 55th: Gold 0 Silver 2 Bronze 2 Total 4

Summer Paralympics appearances (overview)
- 1984; 1988; 1992; 1996; 2000; 2004; 2008; 2012; 2016; 2020; 2024

Jordan competed at the 2008 Summer Paralympics in Beijing, China. Jordanian athletes competed in three sports: athletics, powerlifting and table tennis. Among the competitors was Maha Barghouti, a table tennis player who won Jordan's first Paralympic gold medal at the 2000 Summer Paralympics. The team left for Beijing on September 29.

== Medalists ==
Medal	Name	Sport	Event
Silver	Jamil Elshebli	Athletics	Men's Shot Put - F57/58
Silver	Omar Qarada	Powerlifting	Men's -48 kg
Bronze	Khetam Abuawad; Fatmeh Al-Azzam	Table Tennis	Women's Team - Classes 4/5
Bronze	Mu'taz Aljuneidi	Powerlifting	Men's -75 kg

== Sports ==
=== Athletics ===
==== Men's field ====
Athlete	Class	Event	Final		
Athlete	Class	Event	Result	Points	Rank
Amer Alabbadi	F57-58	Shot put	13.29	888	11
Jamil Elshebli	F57-58	Shot put	14.28	1064	2nd place, silver medalist(s)
Omar Hamadin	F55-56	Discus throw	32.59	846	9
Mohammad Yaseen	F33-34/52	Discus throw	17.05	913	7

==== Women's field ====
Athlete	Class	Event	Final		
Athlete	Class	Event	Result	Points	Rank
Tharwh Al Hajaj	F57-58	Discus throw	23.05	733	13

=== Powerlifting ===
==== Men ====
Athlete	Event	Result	Rank
Mu'taz Aljuneidi	75kg	210.0	3rd place, bronze medalist(s)
Faisal Hammash	56kg	160.0	9
Omar Qarada	48kg	162.5	2nd place, silver medalist(s)

==== Women ====
Athlete	Event	Result	Rank
Fatama Allawi	52kg	80.0	7

=== Table tennis ===
Athlete	Event	Preliminaries				Round of 16	Quarterfinals	Semifinals	Final / BM	
Athlete	Event	Opposition Result	Opposition Result	Opposition Result	Rank	Opposition Result	Opposition Result	Opposition Result	Opposition Result	Rank
Khetam Abuawad	Women's singles C5	Bessho (JPN); W 3-2	Nardelli (ITA); W 3-1	Nir Kistler (USA); W 3-0	1 Q	—N/a		Ren G (CHN); L 0-3	Zimmerer (GER); L 0-3	4
Fatmeh Al-Azzam	Women's singles C4	Perić (SRB); L 2-3	Dolinar (SLO); W 3-0	Rozmiej (POL); W 3-1	2	did not advance				
Maha Al-Bargouti	Women's singles C1-2	Lafaye (FRA); L 1–3	Khazaei (IRI); L 2–3	—N/a	3	did not advance				
Khetam Abuawad; Fatmeh Al-Azzam; Maha Al-Bargouti	Women's team C4-5	—N/a				South Africa (RSA); W 3-0	Chinese Taipei (TPE); W 3-2	China (CHN); L 1-3	Serbia (SRB); W 3-1	3rd place, bronze medalist(s)

== See also ==
- Jordan at the Paralympics
- Jordan at the 2008 Summer Olympics
