= Jordan at the 2024 Summer Paralympics =

- IPC code: JOR
- NPC: Jordan Paralympic Committee

in Paris
- Competitors: 1 in 1 sport
- Flag bearers: Asma Issa; Abdelkareem Mohammad Ahmad Khattab
- Medals Ranked 48th: Gold 2 Silver 0 Bronze 1 Total 3

Summer Paralympics appearances (overview)
- 1984; 1988; 1992; 1996; 2000; 2004; 2008; 2012; 2016; 2020; 2024

Jordan competed at the 2024 Summer Paralympics in Paris, France, from 28 August to 8 September 2024.

== Medalists ==
Medal	Name	Sport	Event	Date
Gold	Omar Sami Hamadeh Qarada	Powerlifting	Men's -49 kg	4 September
Gold	Abdelkareem Khattab	Powerlifting	Men's -97 kg	7 September
Bronze	Ahmad Hindi	Athletics	Men's shot put F34	7 September

=== Medals by sport ===
Medals by sport
Sport	1st place, gold medalist(s)	2nd place, silver medalist(s)	3rd place, bronze medalist(s)	Total
Powerlifting	2	0	0	2
Athletics	0	0	1	1
Total	2	0	1	3

=== Medals by gender ===
Medals by gender
Gender	1st place, gold medalist(s)	2nd place, silver medalist(s)	3rd place, bronze medalist(s)	Total
Female	0	0	0	0
Male	2	0	1	3
Mixed	0	0	0	0
Total	2	0	1	3

=== Medals by date ===
Medals by date
Date	1st place, gold medalist(s)	2nd place, silver medalist(s)	3rd place, bronze medalist(s)	Total
4 September	1	0	0	1
7 September	1	0	1	2
Total	2	0	1	3

== Competitors ==
Sport	Men	Women	Total
Athletics	1	0	1
Powerlifting	1	0	1
Total	1	0	1

== Athletics ==
One Jordanian male athlete, Ahmad Hindi (Shot Put F34), managed to break through the qualifications for the 2024 Paralympics after breaking the qualification limit.

Field events

Athlete	Event	Final	
Athlete	Event	Distance	Position
Ahmad Hindi	Men's shot put F34	11.66 SB	3rd place, bronze medalist(s)

== See also ==
- Jordan at the Paralympics
- Jordan at the 2024 Summer Olympics
