= Powerlifting at the 2008 Summer Paralympics – Men's 48 kg =

Powerlifting - Men's 48 kg at the XIII Paralympic Games
- Venue: Beihang University Gymnasium
- Date: 9 September 2008
- Competitors: 12 from 12 nations

Medalists
| 1st place, gold medalist(s) | | Ruel Ishaku | Nigeria |
| 2nd place, silver medalist(s) | | Omar Qarada | Jordan |
| 3rd place, bronze medalist(s) | | Eay Simay | Laos |

The men's 48 kg powerlifting event at the 2008 Summer Paralympics was contested on 9 September at the Beihang University Gymnasium in Beijing, China. This event was the lightest of the men's powerlifting weight classes, limiting competitors to a maximum of 48 kilograms (105.8 lb) of body mass. Powerlifters were divided into two groups, A and B, with group B beginning their lifts at 13:00 and group A at 13:45.

As with all Paralympic powerlifting events, lifters competed in the bench press. Each athlete was allowed three attempts to bench press as much weight as possible. Athletes attempting to break a record were allowed a fourth attempt. For the attempt to be valid, the competitor must have lowered the weighted bar to his chest, held it motionless for a moment, then pressed the bar upwards until his arms were fully extended. If the competitor failed to meet these requirements or any other rule infraction was committed, the attempt was declared invalid by a team of three referees and the result struck from the record.

== Results ==
| Rank | Name | Group | Body weight (kg) | Attempts (kg) | | | | Result (kg) |
| Rank | Name | Group | Body weight (kg) | 1 | 2 | 3 | 4 | Result (kg) |
|---|---|---|---|---|---|---|---|---|
| 1st place, gold medalist(s) | Ruel Ishaku (NGR) | B | 46.72 | 155.0 | 160.0 | 167.5 | 169.0 WR | 169.0 |
| 2nd place, silver medalist(s) | Omar Qarada (JOR) | A | 43.51 | 157.5 | ~~162.5~~ | 162.5 | ~~169.5~~ | 162.5 |
| 3rd place, bronze medalist(s) | Eay Simay (LAO) | A | 46.66 | 157.5 | ~~160.0~~ | ~~162.5~~ | – | 157.5 |
| 4 | Farman Basha (IND) | A | 46.53 | 155.0 | ~~160.0~~ | ~~160.0~~ | – | 155.0 |
| 5 | Choochat Sukjarern (THA) | A | 48.00 | 150.0 | 155.0 | ~~160.0~~ | – | 155.0 |
| 6 | Rafal Roch (POL) | B | 46.68 | 142.5 | 145.0 | 150.0 | – | 150.0 |
| 7 | Alidou Diamoutene (CIV) | B | 46.72 | 142.5 | ~~150.0~~ | ~~155.0~~ | – | 142.5 |
| 8 | Sandun Batapola Mudalige (SRI) | B | 47.25 | 132.5 | 135.0 | ~~140.0~~ | – | 135.0 |
| 9 | Aigars Visnevskis (LAT) | B | 46.85 | 122.5 | ~~130.0~~ | ~~130.0~~ | – | 122.5 |
| – | Lê Văn Công (VIE) | B | 44.29 | ~~147.5~~ | ~~152.5~~ | ~~152.5~~ | – | NMR |
| – | Morteza Dashti (IRI) | A | 47.69 | ~~162.5~~ | ~~162.5~~ | ~~162.5~~ | – | NMR |
| – | Anthony Peddle (GBR) | A | 47.97 | ~~152.5~~ | ~~152.5~~ | ~~152.5~~ | – | NMR |

Key: WR=World record; NMR=No marks recorded
