= Evânio da Silva =

Brazilian Paralympic powerlifter

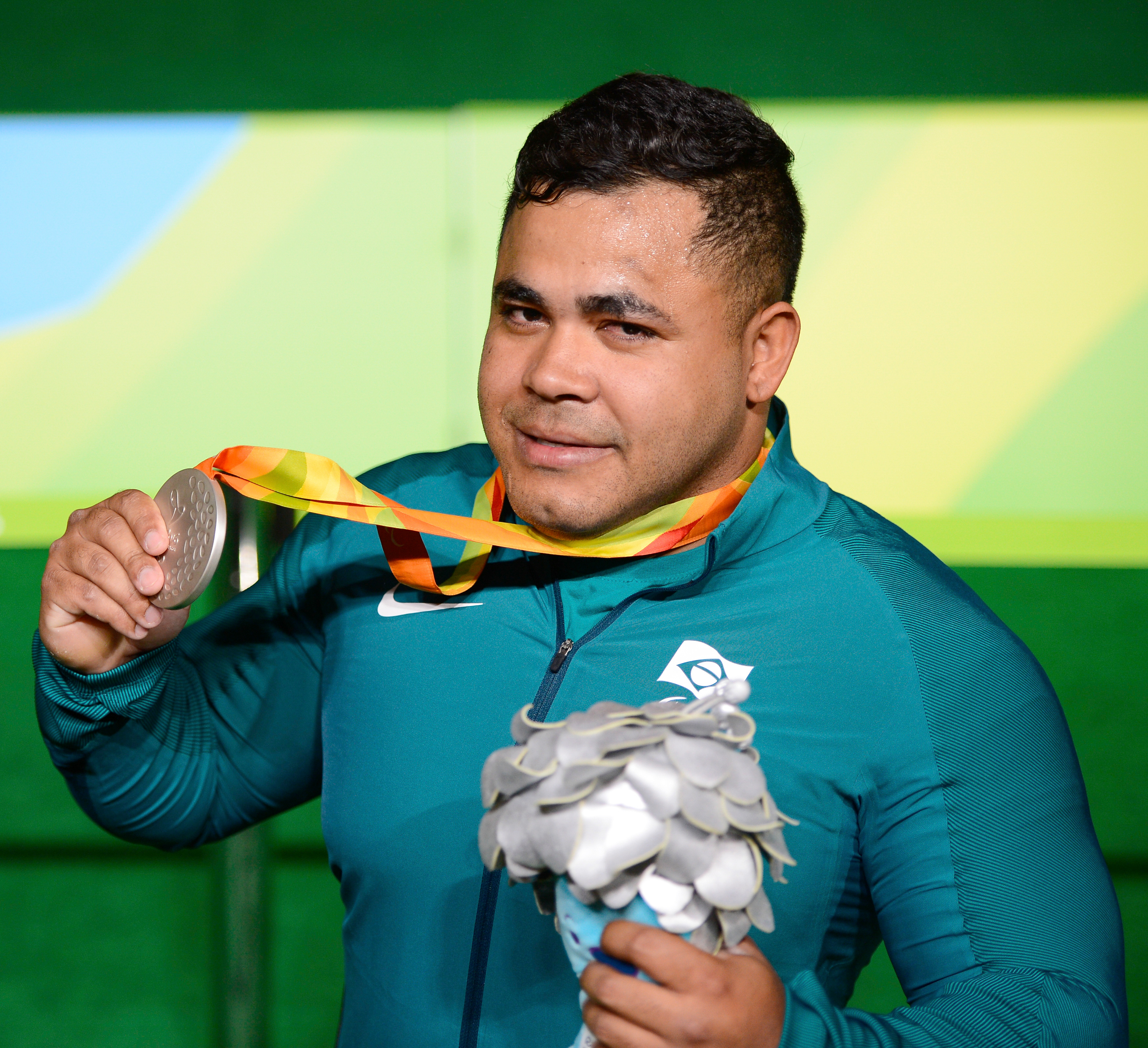
- Evânio da Silva at Rio 2016 Paralympics

Personal information
- Full name: Evânio Rodrigues da Silva
- Born: 2 September 1984 (age 41) Cícero Dantas, Bahia, Brazil

Sport
- Country: Brazil
- Sport: Para powerlifting
- Weight class: 88 kg
Medal record
Paralympic Games
Silver medal – second place	2016 Rio de Janeiro	88 kg
World Championships
Silver medal – second place	2019 Nur-Sultan	Mixed team
Bronze medal – third place	2017 London	88 kg
Parapan American Games
Gold medal – first place	2015 Toronto	80 kg
Gold medal – first place	2019 Lima	88 kg
Gold medal – first place	2023 Santiago	88 kg

Evânio Rodrigues da Silva (born 2 September 1984) is a Brazilian Paralympic powerlifter. He represented Brazil at the 2016 Summer Paralympics held in Rio de Janeiro, Brazil and he won the silver medal in the men's 88 kg event. He also competed at the 2020 Summer Paralympics held in Tokyo, Japan.

He won the gold medal in his event at both the 2015 Parapan American Games and 2019 Parapan American Games.

At the 2017 World Championships held in Mexico City, Mexico, he won the bronze medal in the men's 88 kg event.

In 2021, he competed in the men's 88 kg event at the 2020 Summer Paralympics held in Tokyo, Japan without a successful lift.
