= Jordan at the 1996 Summer Paralympics =

- IPC code: JOR
- NPC: Jordan Paralympic Committee

in Atlanta
- Competitors: 5
- Medals Ranked 56th: Gold 0 Silver 1 Bronze 0 Total 1

Summer Paralympics appearances (overview)
- 1984; 1988; 1992; 1996; 2000; 2004; 2008; 2012; 2016; 2020; 2024

Five male athletes from Jordan competed at the 1996 Summer Paralympics in Atlanta, United States. Imad Gharbawi won the nation's only medal in athletics.

== Medallists ==
Medal	Name	Sport	Event
Silver	Imad Gharbawi	Athletics	Men's discus F52

== See also ==
- Jordan at the Paralympics
- Jordan at the 1996 Summer Olympics
