= Table tennis at the 2020 Summer Paralympics – Women's individual – Class 1–2 =

Table tennis at the XVI Paralympic Games
- Venue: Tokyo Metropolitan Gymnasium
- Dates: 25–29 August 2021
- Competitors: 12 from 12 nations

Medalists
1st place, gold medalist(s)		Liu Jing	China
2nd place, silver medalist(s)		Seo Su-yeon	South Korea
3rd place, bronze medalist(s)		Cátia Oliveira	Brazil
3rd place, bronze medalist(s)		Nadezhda Pushpasheva	RPC

The Women's individual table tennis – Class 1-2 tournament at the 2020 Summer Paralympics in Tokyo is taking place between 25 and 29 August 2021 at Tokyo Metropolitan Gymnasium. Classes 1–5 are for athletes with a physical impairment that affected their legs, and who compete in a sitting position. The lower the number, the greater the impact the impairment is on an athlete's ability to compete.

In the preliminary stage, athletes competed in seven groups of three. Winners and runners-up of each group qualified for the knock-out stage. In this edition of the Games, no bronze medal match will be held. Losers of each semifinal will automatically be awarded a bronze medal.

== Results ==
All times are local time in UTC+9.

=== Preliminary round ===
The first two matches were played on 25 August, and the third on 26 August.

Qualified for the knock-out stage

==== Group A ====
Seed	Athlete	Matches won	Matches lost	Games won	Games lost	Points diff	Rank
	Giada Rossi (ITA)	2	0				1
	Maria Garrone (ARG)	1	1				2
	Isabelle Lafaye (FRA)	0	2				3

Giada Rossi (ITA)	11	7	11	11
Maria Garrone (ARG)	7	11	9	4

Maria Garrone (ARG)	11	15	11
Isabelle Lafaye (FRA)	6	13	4

Giada Rossi (ITA)	11	13	11
Isabelle Lafaye (FRA)	7	11	7

==== Group B ====
Seed	Athlete	Matches won	Matches lost	Games won	Games lost	Points diff	Rank
	Liu Jing (CHN)	2	0				1
	Ana Prvulovic (SRB)	1	1				2
	Chilchitparyak Bootwansirina (THA)	0	2				3

Liu Jing (CHN)	11	11	11
Ana Prvulovic (SRB)	3	3	7

Ana Prvulovic (SRB)	11	11	11
Chilchitparyak Bootwansirina (THA)	6	7	5

Liu Jing (CHN)	11	11	11
Chilchitparyak Bootwansirina (THA)	8	8	7

==== Group C ====
Seed	Athlete	Matches won	Matches lost	Games won	Games lost	Points diff	Rank
	Seo Su-yeon (KOR)	2	0				1
	Nadezhda Pushpasheva (RPC)	1	1				2
	Maryam Almyrisl (KSA)	0	2				3

Seo Su-yeon (KOR)	9	8	11	11	11
Nadezhda Pushpasheva (RPC)	11	11	6	2	6

Nadezhda Pushpasheva (RPC)	11	11	11
Maryam Almyrisl (KSA)	3	3	2

Seo Su-yeon (KOR)	11	11	11
Maryam Almyrisl (KSA)	1	1	2

==== Group D ====
Seed	Athlete	Matches won	Matches lost	Games won	Games lost	Points diff	Rank
	Dorota Bucław (POL)	2	0				1
	Cátia Oliveira (BRA)	1	1				2
	Aino Tapola (FIN)	0	2				3

Dorota Bucław (POL)	8	12	11	12
Cátia Oliveira (BRA)	11	10	9	10

Cátia Oliveira (BRA)	11	7	11	11
Aino Tapola (FIN)	4	11	8	8

Dorota Bucław (POL)	11	11	11
Aino Tapola (FIN)	4	5	6

=== Final Rounds ===
Quarterfinals
A1	Giada Rossi (ITA)	8	9	6
D2	Cátia Oliveira (BRA)	11	11	11
B2	Ana Prvulovic (SRB)	4	7	6
C1	Seo Su-yeon (KOR)	11	11	11
D1	Dorota Bucław (POL)	11	6	10	8
C2	Nadezhda Pushpasheva (RPC)	8	11	12	11
A2	Maria Garrone (ARG)	8	7	1
B1	Liu Jing (CHN)	11	11	11

Semifinals
D2	Cátia Oliveira (BRA)	11	8	5	9
C1	Seo Su-yeon (KOR)	7	11	11	11
C2	Nadezhda Pushpasheva (RPC)	8	4	11	5
B1	Liu Jing (CHN)	11	11	8	11

Gold medal match
C1	Seo Su-yeon (KOR)	7	8	11	8
B1	Liu Jing (CHN)	11	11	4	11
