= Table tennis at the 2004 Summer Paralympics – Women's team – Class 1–3 =

Table Tennis - Women's Teams 1-3 at the XII Paralympic Games
- Paralympic Table Tennis
- Venue: Galatsi Olympic Hall
- Dates: 23–27 September 2004
- Competitors: 3

Medalists
1st place, gold medalist(s)		Genevieve Clot; Isabelle Lafaye Marziou; Stephanie Mariage	France

The Women's Teams 1-3 table tennis competition at the 2004 Summer Paralympics was held from 23 to 27 September at the Galatsi Olympic Hall.

Classes 1-5 were for athletes with a physical impairment that affected their legs, who competed in a sitting position. The lower the number, the greater the impact the impairment was on an athlete’s ability to compete.

The event was won by the team representing France.

== Results ==
Rank	Competitor	MP	W	L	Points	FRA	JPN	GBR
1st place, gold medalist(s)	France	1	1	0	3:1	x	3:1	W/O
2	Japan	2	1	1	4:4	1:3	x	3:1
3	Great Britain	1	0	1	1:3	DNS	1:3	x

== Team Lists ==
France; Genevieve Clot; Isabelle Lafaye Marziou; Stephanie Mariage	Japan; Satoko Fujiwara; Tomoko Fukuzawa	Great Britain; Catherine Mitton; Lynne Riding
