= Jordan at the 2000 Summer Paralympics =

- IPC code: JOR
- NPC: Jordan Paralympic Committee

in Sydney
- Competitors: 7 in 2 sports
- Medals Ranked 49th: Gold 1 Silver 0 Bronze 0 Total 1

Summer Paralympics appearances (overview)
- 1984; 1988; 1992; 1996; 2000; 2004; 2008; 2012; 2016; 2020; 2024

There were 2 female and 5 male athletes representing the country at the 2000 Summer Paralympics. Jordan won its first gold medal in the games.

== Medallists ==
Medal	Name	Sport	Event
Gold	Maha Al-Bargouti	Table tennis	Women's singles 1–2

== See also ==
- Jordan at the 2000 Summer Olympics
- Jordan at the Paralympics

== Bibliography ==
- International Paralympic Committee (2000). "Appendix C: Athlete Numbers - By Delegation". Sydney 2000 Paralympic Games Post Games Report. Sydney.
