= Nadezhda Pushpasheva =

Russian para table tennis player

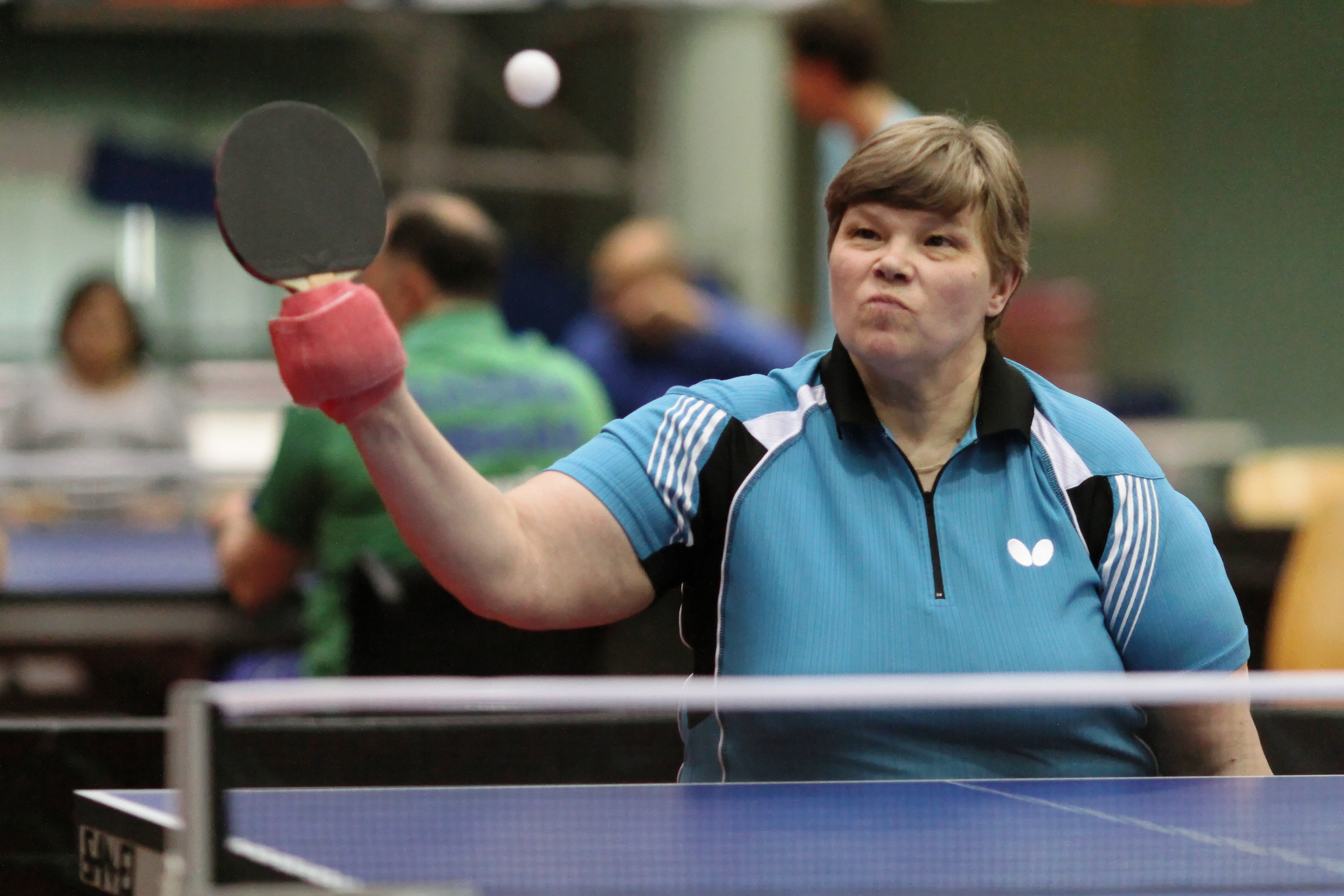

Personal information
- Born: 29 December 1959 (age 66) Votkinsk, Russia

Sport
- Sport: Table tennis
Medal record
Representing RPC
Paralympic Games
Bronze medal – third place	2020 Tokyo	Singles C1-2

Nadezhda Pushpasheva (born 29 December 1959) is a Russian para table tennis player. She won one of the bronze medals in the women's individual C1-2 event at the 2020 Summer Paralympics held in Tokyo, Japan.
