= Powerlifting at the 2016 Summer Paralympics – Women's 86 kg =

Powerlifting – Women's 86 kg at the XV Paralympic Games
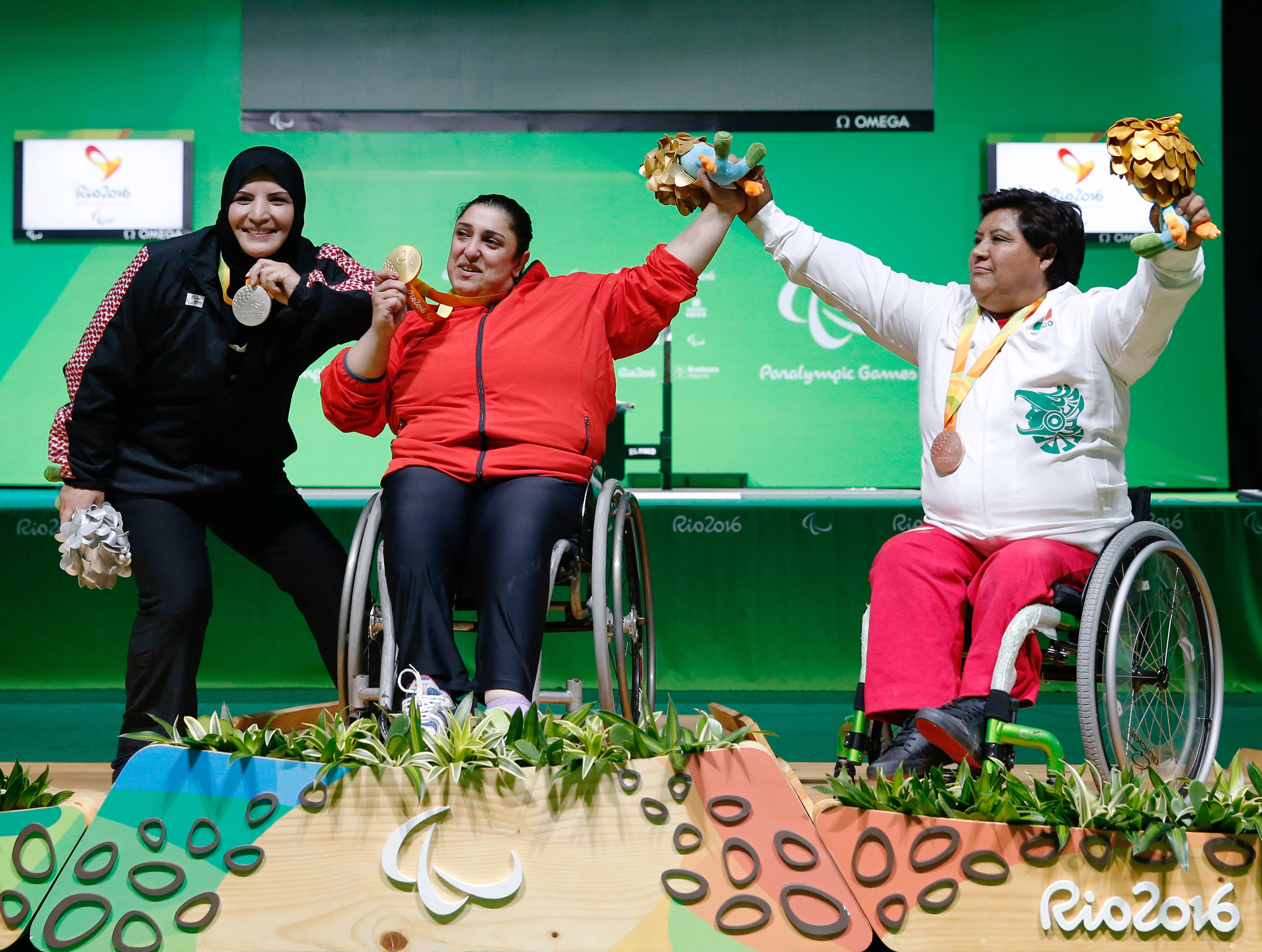
- Left-right: Alhajaj, Mahmoud, Díaz
- Venue: Riocentro Pavilion 2
- Date: 15 September 2016
- Competitors: 6 from 6 nations
- Winning lift: 130.0 kg

Medalists
1st place, gold medalist(s)		Randa Mahmoud	Egypt
2nd place, silver medalist(s)		Tharwh Tayseer Hamdan Alhajaj	Jordan
3rd place, bronze medalist(s)		Catalina Diaz Vilchis	Mexico

The women's 86 kg powerlifting event at the 2016 Summer Paralympics was contested on 14 September at Riocentro Pavilion 2. The best outcome out of three attempts counted as the final results. The athlete who placed first in each event was allowed a fourth attempt to break the Paralympic or world record.

== Records ==
There are twenty powerlifting events, corresponding to ten weight classes each for men and women. The weight categories were significantly adjusted after the 2012 Games so most of the weights are new for 2016. As a result, no Paralympic record was available for this weight class prior to the competition. The existing world records were as follows.

Record Type	Weight	Country	Venue	Date
World record	144.0 kg	Loveline Obiji (NGR)	Glasgow	2 August 2014
Paralympic record	–	–	–	–

== Results ==
Rank	Name	Body weight (kg)	Attempts (kg)				Result (kg)
Rank	Name	Body weight (kg)	1	2	3	4	Result (kg)
1st place, gold medalist(s)	Randa Mahmoud (EGY)	85.93	125.0	130.0 PR	~~140.0~~	~~137.0~~	130.0
2nd place, silver medalist(s)	Tharwh Tayseer Hamdan Alhajaj (JOR)	83.48	116.0	~~119.0~~	119.0	–	119.0
3rd place, bronze medalist(s)	Catalina Diaz Vilchis (MEX)	80.26	113.0	~~116.0~~	117.0	–	117.0
4	Li Fengmei (CHN)	83.02	111.0	~~117.0~~	~~117.0~~	–	111.0
5	Marcia Cristina Menezes (BRA)	83.85	100.0	105.0	~~110.0~~	–	105.0
6	Haifa Naqbi (UAE)	82.44	80.0	~~90.0~~	~~95.0~~	–	80.0
