= Cátia Oliveira =

Brazilian para table tennis player (born 1991)

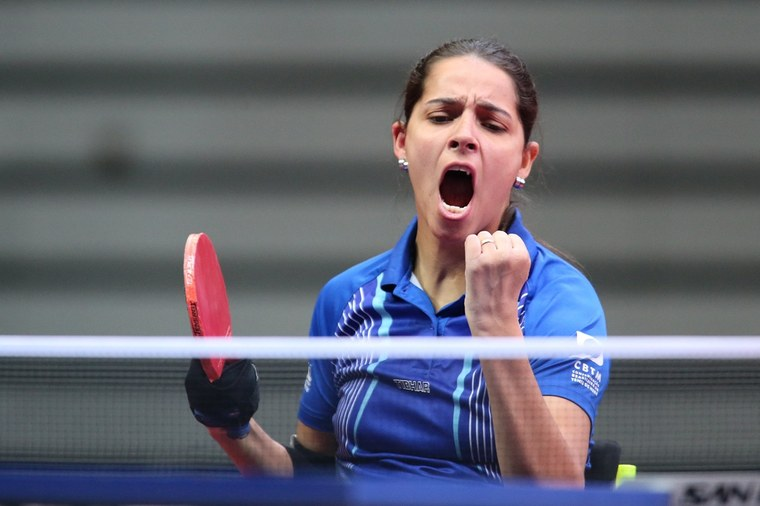

Personal information
- Full name: Cátia Cristina da Silva Oliveira
- Born: 12 June 1991 (age 35) Cerqueira César, Brazil
- Website: http://catiaoliveira.com.br/

Sport
- Country: Brazil
- Sport: Para table tennis
- Event: Class 2

Achievements and titles
- Paralympic finals: 2016
Medal record
Table tennis
Representing Brazil
Paralympic Games
Bronze medal – third place	2020 Tokyo	Women's individual C1-2
Bronze medal – third place	2024 Paris	Doubles WD5
Parapan American Games
Gold medal – first place	2015 Toronto	Women's individual C1-2
Bronze medal – third place	2019 Lima	Women's individual C1-2
Association football career
- Position: Midfielder
Senior career*
Years	Team	Apps	(Gls)
2005–2007	Botucatu		
International career
2007	Brazil U-17	0	(0)
- * Club domestic league appearances and goals

Cátia Cristina da Silva Oliveira (born 12 June 1991) is a Brazilian Para table tennis player and former footballer. Cátia won a gold medal at the 2015 Parapan American Games and was selected for the 2016 Paralympic Games in her home country. Cátia began playing table tennis in 2013 and developed quickly, winning a place on Brazil's national team in time for the 2015 Parapan American Games. In October 2018 she won a silver medal at the World Para Table Tennis Championships in Slovenia. She was bereaved by the untimely death of her father during the tournament.

Botucatu Futebol Clube signed Cátia as a promising footballer when she was 14 years old. In October 2007, teammate Renata Costa was driving Cátia and Michele in her Opel Corsa when she crashed into another car at a level crossing. Michele and Renata suffered minor injuries, while Cátia, who was asleep in the back seat, suffered a spinal cord injury resulting in paraplegia. Costa was fined $576 for driving without a licence. Cátia had been called up to the Brazil women's national under-17 football team on the day of the accident.

In June 2021 she was one of the women as part of Brazil's table tennis team for the 2020 Paralympic Games which were delayed for a year due to the Coronavirus pandemic. The other athletes were Bruna Costa Alexandre (class 10), Danielle Rauen (in class 9) and Joyce Oliveira (in class 4).
