= Anastasios Tsiou =

Greek Paralympic athlete

Medal record

Paralympic athletics

Representing Greece

Paralympic Games
| Bronze medal – third place | 2008 Beijing | Shot Put - F57-58 |

Anastasios Tsiou is a Paralympian athlete from Greece competing mainly in category F57-58 shot put events.

In 2006, he won a gold medal in shot put at the 2006 IPC Athletics World Championships in Assen, Netherlands. He competed in the 2008 Summer Paralympics in Beijing, China. There he won a bronze medal in the men's F57-58 shot put event.
