= Powerlifting at the 2020 Summer Paralympics – Men's 88 kg =

Powerlifting – Men's 88 kg at the XVI Paralympic Games
- Venue: Tokyo International Forum
- Date: 29 August 2021
- Competitors: 9 from 9 nations

Medalists
1st place, gold medalist(s)		Abdelkareem Khattab	Jordan
2nd place, silver medalist(s)		Ye Jixiong	China
3rd place, bronze medalist(s)		Hany Abdelhady	Egypt

The men's 88 kg powerlifting event at the 2020 Summer Paralympics was contested on 29 August at Tokyo International Forum.

== Records ==
There are twenty powerlifting events, corresponding to ten weight classes each for men and women. Prior to this competition, the existing world and Paralympic records were as follows.

World Record	Abdelkareem Khattab (JOR)	240 kg	Dubai, United Arab Emirates	21 June 2021
Paralympic Record	Record minimum standard	225 kg		

== Results ==
Rank	Name	Body weight (kg)	Attempts (kg)				Result (kg)
Rank	Name	Body weight (kg)	1	2	3	4	Result (kg)
1st place, gold medalist(s)	Abdelkareem Khattab (JOR)	86.37	220	225	231 PR	–	231
2nd place, silver medalist(s)	Ye Jixiong (CHN)	83.85	215	220	~~231~~	–	220
3rd place, bronze medalist(s)	Hany Abdelhady (EGY)	86.62	214	~~217~~	~~221~~	–	214
4	Farhod Umirzakov (UZB)	85.56	212	~~216~~	~~216~~	–	212
5	Rakhmetzhan Khamayev (KAZ)	86.20	195	~~201~~	~~214~~	–	195
6	Sedric Roussel Watchou Kouokam (HUN)	85.79	170	177	181	–	181
7	Oniger Drake (CUB)	85.93	170	177	181	-	181
	Evânio da Silva (BRA)	85.63	~~200~~	~~200~~	~~200~~	–	NM
	Mohammed Khamis Khalaf (UAE)	87.31	–	–	–	–	DNF
