= Seo Su-yeon =

South Korean para table tennis player

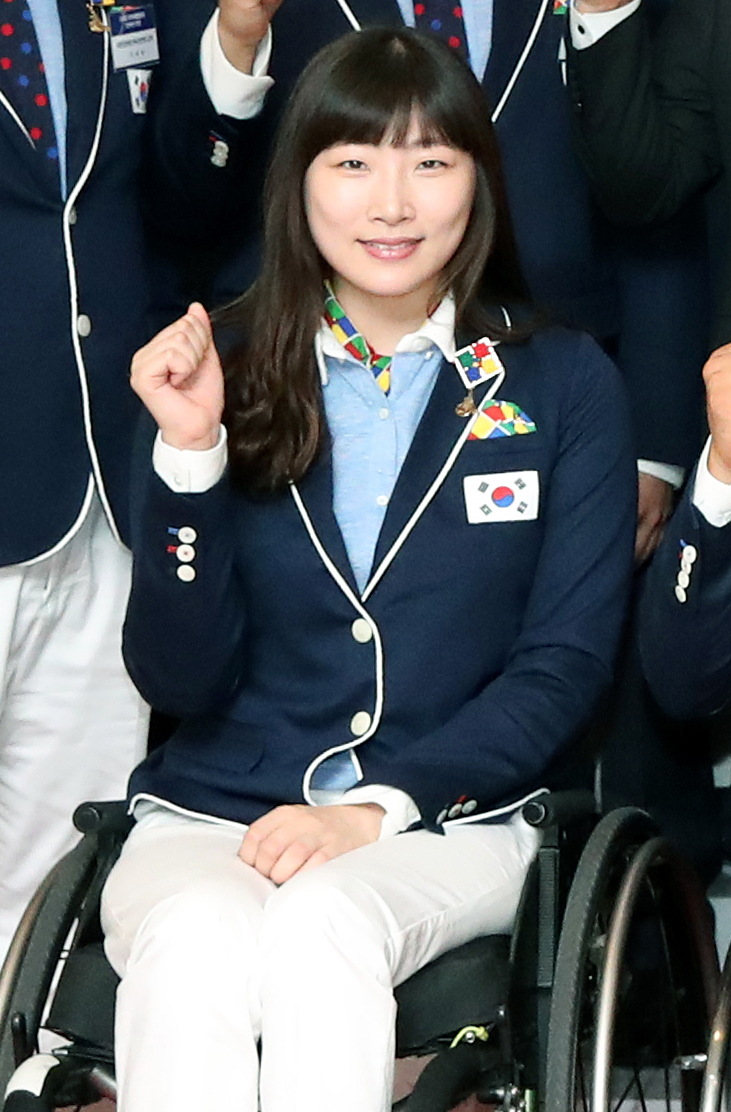
- Seo before the 2016 Summer Paralympics

Personal information
- Born: January 8, 1986 (age 40) Mokpo, South Jeolla, South Korea
- Height: 174 cm (5 ft 9 in)
- Weight: 60 kg (132 lb)

Sport
- Sport: Table tennis
- Playing style: Right-handed shakehand grip
- Disability class: 2 (formerly 3)
- Highest ranking: 1 (November 2015)
- Current ranking: 3 (February 2020)
Medal record
Women's para table tennis
Representing South Korea
Paralympic Games
Silver medal – second place	2016 Rio de Janeiro	Singles C1–2
Silver medal – second place	2020 Tokyo	Singles C1–2
Silver medal – second place	2020 Tokyo	Teams C1–3
Silver medal – second place	2024 Paris	Doubles WD5
Bronze medal – third place	2016 Rio de Janeiro	Teams C1–3
Bronze medal – third place	2024 Paris	Singles WS1-2
World Championships
Gold medal – first place	2018 Lasko	Singles C1-2
Silver medal – second place	2014 Gwangju	Singles C1–3
Bronze medal – third place	2014 Gwangju	Teams C1–3
Asian Para Games
Gold medal – first place	2022 Hangzhou	Singles C1–2
Gold medal – first place	2022 Hangzhou	Doubles WD5
Gold medal – first place	2022 Hangzhou	Mixed Doubles MD4
Silver medal – second place	2014 Incheon	Singles C1–2
Silver medal – second place	2014 Incheon	Teams C1–3
Bronze medal – third place	2018 Jakarta	Singles C1–3
Bronze medal – third place	2018 Jakarta	Teams C2–5
Asian Championships
Gold medal – first place	2015 Amman	Singles C1–2
Silver medal – second place	2015 Amman	Teams C1–3
Silver medal – second place	2017 Beijing	Teams C1–3
Bronze medal – third place	2013 Beijing	Teams C1–3

Seo Su-yeon (Korean: 서수연, born January 8, 1986) is a South Korean para table tennis player. She won a silver medal and a bronze at the 2016 Summer Paralympics. She also won two silver medals at the 2020 Summer Paralympics held in Tokyo, Japan. She is coached by Cho Jae-kwan.

== Personal life ==
When she was 18, Seo aspired to be a model and visited a hospital to correct her posture. Instead, she was paralysed by an injection. She began playing table tennis while she fought the hospital in courts.
