= Jordan at the 1984 Summer Paralympics =

- IPC code: JOR
- NPC: Jordan Paralympic Committee

in Stoke Mandeville/New York
- Competitors: 9
- Medals Ranked 39th: Gold 0 Silver 1 Bronze 2 Total 3

Summer Paralympics appearances (overview)
- 1984; 1988; 1992; 1996; 2000; 2004; 2008; 2012; 2016; 2020; 2024

Jordan competed at the 1984 Summer Paralympics in Stoke Mandeville, Great Britain and New York City, United States. 9 competitors from Jordan won 3 medals, 1 silver and 2 bronze and finished joint 39th in the medal table with Zimbabwe.

== See also ==
- Jordan at the Paralympics
- Jordan at the 1984 Summer Olympics
