= Powerlifting at the 2004 Summer Paralympics – Women's 67.5 kg =

Women's Up To 67.5 kg at the XII Paralympic Games
- Paralympic Powerlifting
- Venue: Nikaia Olympic Weightlifting Hall
- Dates: 24 September 2004
- Competitors: 9 from 9 nations
- Winning weight(kg): 142.5

Medalists
1st place, gold medalist(s)		Heba Ahmed	Egypt
2nd place, silver medalist(s)		Zhang Li Ping	China
3rd place, bronze medalist(s)		Catalina Diaz Vilchis	Mexico

The Women's 67.5 kg powerlifting event at the 2004 Summer Paralympics was competed on 24 September. It was won by Heba Ahmed, representing Egypt.

== Final round ==
24 Sept. 2004, 17:15

Rank	Athlete	Weight(kg)	Notes
1st place, gold medalist(s)	Heba Ahmed (EGY)	142.5	WR
2nd place, silver medalist(s)	Zhang Li Ping (CHN)	135.0	
3rd place, bronze medalist(s)	Catalina Diaz Vilchis (MEX)	110.0	
4	Olga Serguienko (RUS)	90.0	
5	Anastasia Kazantzidou (GRE)	85.0	
6	Akouavi Bladine Sahenou (BEN)	50.0	
	Nacera Belarbi (ALG)	NMR	
	Victoria Nneji (NGR)	NMR	
	Rasha Sheikh (SYR)	NMR	
