= Athletics at the 2008 Summer Paralympics – Men's shot put F57–58 =

Men's Shot Put F57/58 at the XIII Paralympic Games
- Venue: Beijing National Stadium
- Dates: 9 September
- Competitors: 14 from 12 nations
- Winning distance: 16.03

Medalists
1st place, gold medalist(s)		Alexey Ashapatov	Russia
2nd place, silver medalist(s)		Jamil Elshebli	Jordan
3rd place, bronze medalist(s)		Anastasios Tsiou	Greece

The men's shot put F57/58 event at the 2008 Summer Paralympics took place at the Beijing National Stadium at 09:05 on 9 September. There was a single round of competition; after the first three throws, only the top eight had 3 further throws. The competition was won by Alexey Ashapatov, representing Russia.

== Results ==
Rank	Athlete	Nationality	Cl.	1	2	3	4	5	6	Best	Pts.	Notes
1st place, gold medalist(s)	Alexey Ashapatov	Russia	F58	15.98	15.63	15.62	15.12	15.11	16.03	16.03	1072	WR
2nd place, silver medalist(s)	Jamil Elshebli	Jordan	F57	13.52	13.72	14.28	13.61	13.66	13.31	14.28	1064	WR
3rd place, bronze medalist(s)	Anastasios Tsiou	Greece	F57	13.31	13.22	13.72	13.34	13.13	13.63	13.72	1023	SB
4	Janusz Rokicki	Poland	F58	15.26	15.00	14.99	14.85	15.29	14.76	15.29	1022	SB
5	Michael Louwrens	South Africa	F57	13.64	13.54	13.44	13.31	13.35	13.10	13.64	1017	SB
6	Mehdi Moradi	Iran	F57	13.44	13.31	13.15	12.25	12.78	12.66	13.44	1002	
7	Minas Charakopoulos	Greece	F57	12.41	12.21	12.83	12.05	12.68	12.84	12.84	957	SB
8	Nathan Stephens	Great Britain	F57	12.45	12.08	12.57	11.83	12.03	12.20	12.57	937	
9	Julius Hutka	Slovakia	F57	12.07	12.15	12.21	-	-	-	12.21	910	
10	Chinedu Silver Ezeikpe	Nigeria	F58	13.29	13.26	12.96	-	-	-	13.29	888	
11	Amer Alabbadi	Jordan	F58	12.84	13.29	12.90	-	-	-	13.29	888	
12	Alexis Pizarro-Jimenez	Puerto Rico	F58	12.33	12.99	12.86	-	-	-	12.99	868	
13	Leonardo Amancio	Brazil	F58	12.55	12.80	12.60	-	-	-	12.80	856	
14	Pasilione Tafilagi	France	F58	12.26	12.49	12.00	-	-	-	12.49	835	

WR = World Record. SB = Seasonal Best.
