= Omar Qarada =

Jordanian Paralympic powerlifter

Personal information
- Native name: عمر قرادة
- Full name: Omar Sami Hamadeh Qarada
- Born: 1 March 1981 (age 45)

Sport
- Country: Jordan
- Sport: Para powerlifting
Medal record
Men's para powerlifting
Representing Jordan
Paralympic Games
Gold medal – first place	2020 Tokyo	49 kg
Gold medal – first place	2024 Paris	49 kg
Silver medal – second place	2008 Beijing	48 kg
Silver medal – second place	2016 Rio de Janeiro	49 kg
World Championships
Gold medal – first place	2010 Kuala Lumpur	48 kg
Gold medal – first place	2021 Tbilisi	49 kg
Silver medal – second place	2017 Mexico City	49 kg
Silver medal – second place	2019 Nur-Sultan	49 kg
Asian Para Games
Gold medal – first place	2010 Guangzhou	48 kg
Gold medal – first place	2022 Hangzhou	49 kg
Gold medal – first place	2026 Aichi–Nagoya	49 kg

Omar Sami Hamadeh Qarada (Arabic: عمر قرادة; born 1 March 1981) is a Jordanian Paralympic powerlifter. He is a four-time medalist, including two gold medals, at both the Summer Paralympics and the World Para Powerlifting Championships. He is the first powerlifter representing Jordan to win a gold medal at the Paralympics.

== Career ==
At the 2010 Asian Para Games held in Guangzhou, China, he won the gold medal in his event.

Qarada represented Jordan at the 2008, 2016, 2020 and the 2024 Summer Paralympics. He won a medal on all four of those occasions: in 2008, he won the silver medal in the men's 48 kg and at the 2016 Summer Paralympics in the men's 49 kg event, as well as gold in the men's 49 kg at the 2020 Summer Paralympics. Both Qarada and Lê Văn Công of Vietnam lifted 173 kg at the 2020 Summer Paralympics and Qarada won the gold medal as a result of his lighter body weight. Qarada won the gold medal in the men's 49 kg event at the 2024 Summer Paralympics held in Paris, France.

Qarada is also a two-time gold medalist in his event at the World Para Powerlifting Championships; he won the gold medal both in 2010 and in 2021. In 2017, he won the silver medal in the men's 49 kg event at the World Para Powerlifting Championships held in Mexico City, Mexico. At the 2019 World Para Powerlifting Championships held in Nur-Sultan, Kazakhstan, he also won the silver medal in the men's 49 kg event.

== Results ==
Year	Venue	Weight	Attempts (kg)				Total	Rank
Year	Venue	Weight	1	2	3	4	Total	Rank
Summer Paralympics
2008	Beijing, China	48 kg	157.5	~~162.5~~	162.5	~~169.5~~	162.5	2nd place, silver medalist(s)
2016	Rio de Janeiro, Brazil	49 kg	170	177	~~181~~	–	177	2nd place, silver medalist(s)
2021	Tokyo, Japan	49 kg	170	~~172~~	173	–	173	1st place, gold medalist(s)
2024	Paris, France	49 kg	175	177	181	~~185~~	181	1st place, gold medalist(s)
