= Giada Rossi =

Italian Paralympic table tennis player

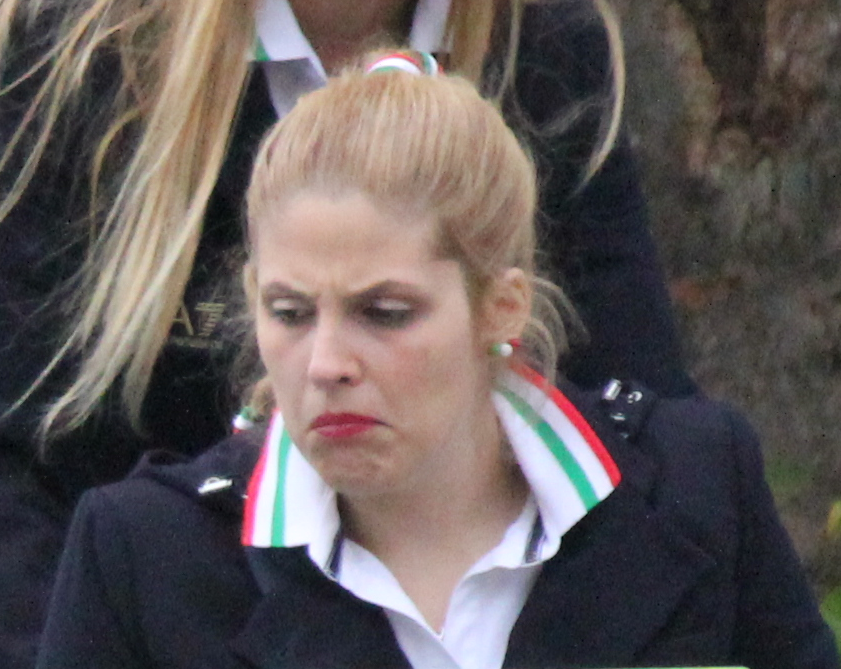
- Giada Rossi with bronze medal won in 2016 Summer Paralympics

Personal information
- Nationality: Italian
- Born: 24 August 1994 (age 32) San Vito al Tagliamento, Italy

Sport
- Country: Italy
- Sport: Para table tennis
Medal record
Event / 1st / 2nd / 3rd; Paralympic Games / 1 / 0 / 2
Women's para table tennis
Representing Italy
Paralympic Games
Gold medal – first place	2024 Paris	Singles C1–2
Bronze medal – third place	2016 Rio de Janeiro	Singles C1–2
Bronze medal – third place	2020 Tokyo	Singles C1–2

Giada Rossi (born 24 August 1994 in San Vito al Tagliamento) is an Italian paralympic table tennis player. She competed at the 2016 Summer Paralympics, in Women's Singles Class 1-2, winning a bronze medal. She competed at the 2020 Summer Paralympics, in Women's team – Class 1–3, winning a bronze medal.

== Achievements ==
Year	Competition	Venue	Rank	Event	Notes
2016	Paralympics Games	(Brazil) Rio de Janeiro	3rd	Individual – Class 1-2	
2021	Paralympics Games	(Japan) Tokyo	3rd	Team – Class 1-2	

== See also ==
- Italy at the 2016 Summer Paralympics
- Italy at the 2020 Summer Paralympics
