= Cícero Dantas =

Municipality of Bahia, Brazil

Coordinates: 10°36′S 38°23′W

- Municipality
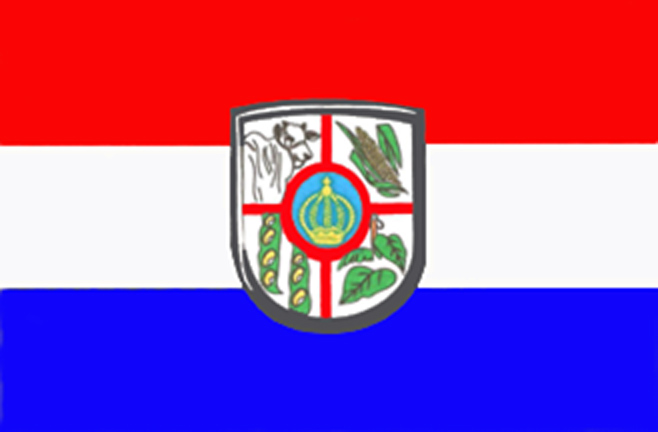
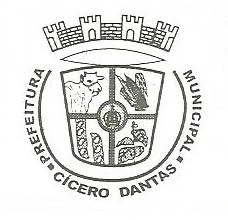
- Flag Coat of arms
- Interactive map of Cícero Dantas
- Country: Brazil
- Region: Nordeste
- State: Bahia

Population (2020)
  - Total: 32,576
- Time zone: UTC−3 (BRT)

Cícero Dantas is a municipality in the state of Bahia in the North-East region of Brazil.

== See also ==
- List of municipalities in Bahia
