= Ye Jixiong =

Chinese Paralympic powerlifter

Personal information
- Born: 25 May 1993 (age 33) Yunfu, China

Sport
- Country: China
- Sport: Paralympic powerlifting
Medal record
Paralympic Games
Silver medal – second place	2020 Tokyo	88 kg
Silver medal – second place	2024 Paris	97 kg
World Championships
Gold medal – first place	2017 Mexico City	88 kg
Gold medal – first place	2019 Nur-Sultan	88 kg
Bronze medal – third place	2021 Tbilisi	88 kg
Asian Para Games
Gold medal – first place	2018 Jakarta	88 kg
Silver medal – second place	2022 Hangzhou	88 kg

Ye Jixiong (born 25 May 1993) is a Chinese Paralympic powerlifter. He won the silver medal in the men's 88 kg event at the 2020 Summer Paralympics held in Tokyo, Japan. He is also a three-time medalist, including two gold medals, at the World Para Powerlifting Championships.

== Career ==
In 2017, he won the gold medal in the men's 88 kg event at the World Para Powerlifting Championships held in Mexico City, Mexico.

At the 2018 Asia-Oceania Open Powerlifting Championships held in Kitakyushu, Japan, he set a new world record of 233.5 kg. At the 2019 World Para Powerlifting Championships held in Nur-Sultan, Kazakhstan, he won the gold medal in the men's 88 kg event.

== Results ==
Year	Venue	Weight	Attempts (kg)				Total	Rank
Year	Venue	Weight	1	2	3	4	Total	Rank
Summer Paralympics
2021	Tokyo, Japan	88 kg	215	220	~~231~~	–	220	2nd place, silver medalist(s)
World Championships
2017	Mexico City, Mexico	88 kg	215	220	226	~~233.5~~	226	1st place, gold medalist(s)
2019	Nur-Sultan, Kazakhstan	88 kg	220	228	~~234.5~~	–	228	1st place, gold medalist(s)
2021	Tbilisi, Georgia	88 kg	205	~~210~~	211	–	211	3rd place, bronze medalist(s)
