= Clara Podda =

Italian para table tennis player and para swimmer

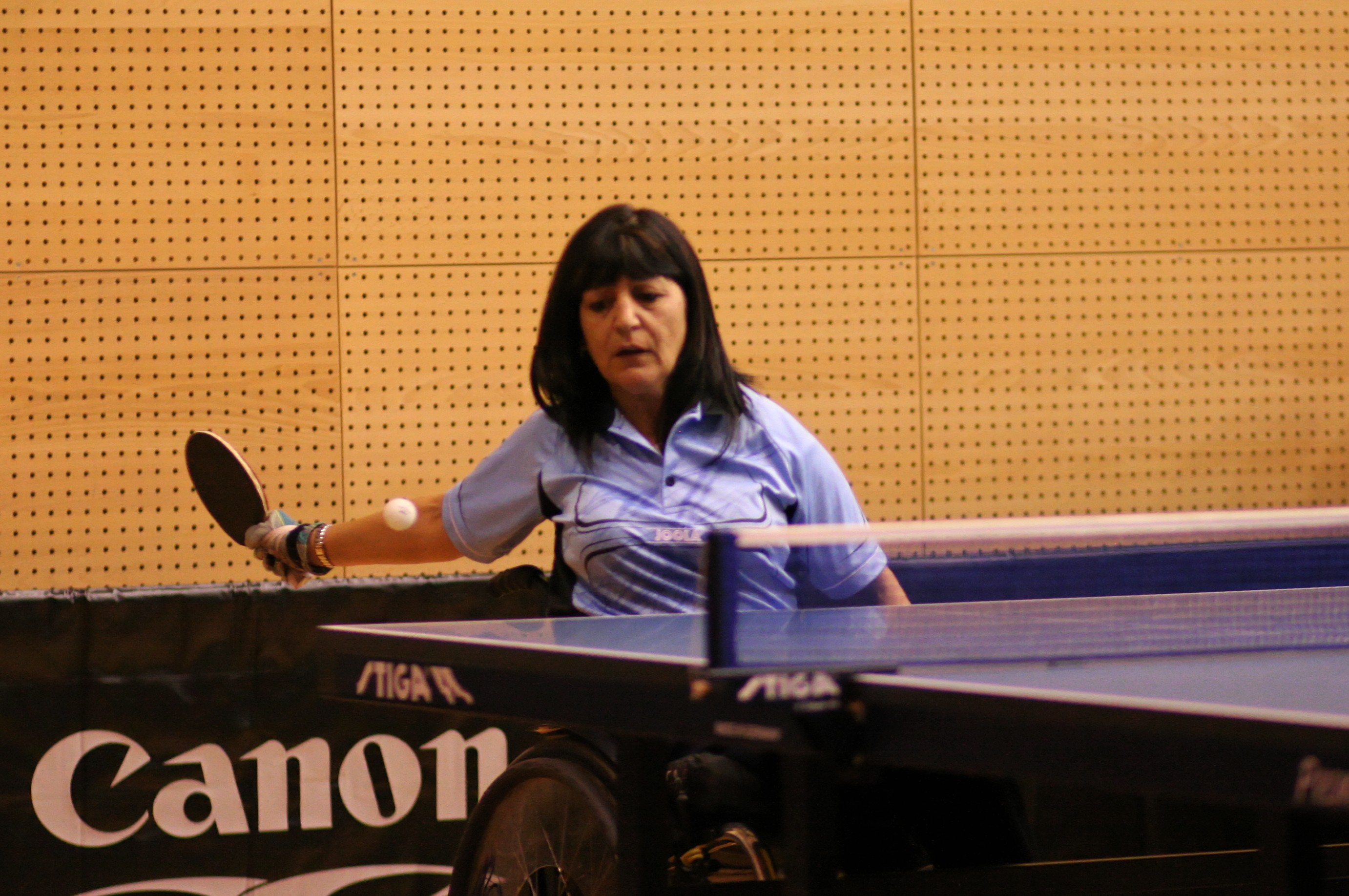

Personal information
- Nationality: Italian
- Born: 19 July 1951 (age 74) Cagliari, Italy

Sport
- Country: Italy
- Sport: Para table tennis
- Disability: Paraplegia
- Disability class: C2
- Club: Saint Lucia Sports Club
- Coached by: Alessandro Arcigli
Medal record
Para table tennis
Representing Italy
Paralympic Games
Silver medal – second place	2008 Beijing	Team class 1–3
Bronze medal – third place	2008 Beijing	Class 1–2
World Championships
Silver medal – second place	2010 Gwangju	Team class 1–3
Bronze medal – third place	2006 Montreux	Class 1–2

Clara Podda (born 19 July 1951) is an Italian para table tennis player and para swimmer who has won two medals at the Summer Paralympics.

== Biography ==
Married with two children, she competed in swimming at the 1996 Summer Paralympics. She was fourth in the individual para table tennis tournament in the 2000 Summer Paralympics and also in the 2004 Summer Paralympics, before she won her first medals in the 2008 Summer Paralympics.

== See also ==
- Italy at the 2004 Summer Paralympics
- Italy at the 2008 Summer Paralympics
- Italy at the 2012 Summer Paralympics
