= Florence Gossiaux =

French Paralympic athlete

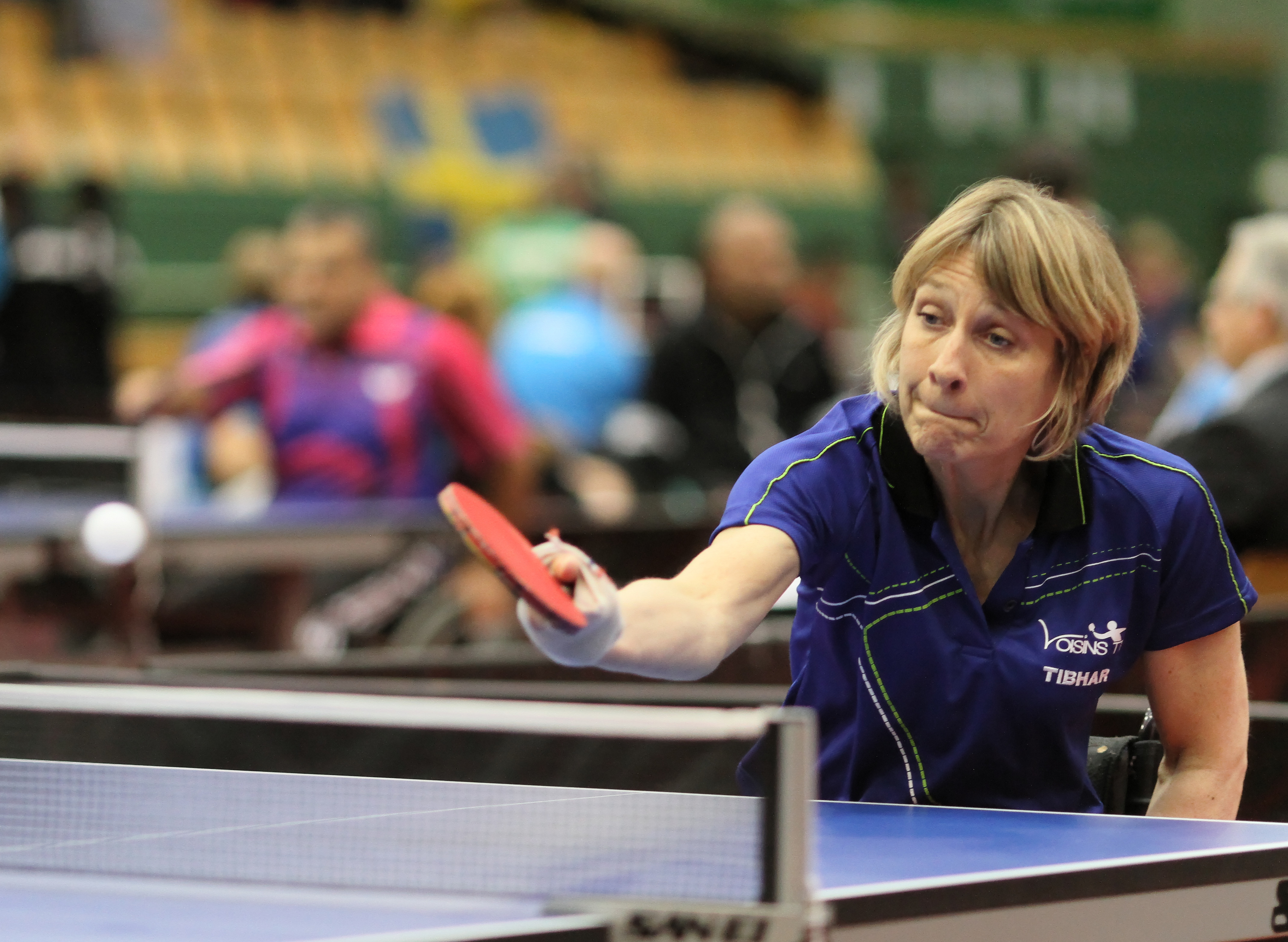
- Gossiaux at the Slovenia Open in 2017

Personal information
- Full name: Florence Sireau-Gossiaux
- Born: 25 May 1966 (age 60)

Sport
- Sport: Para-athletics
- Disability class: T52
Medal record
Women's para athletics
Representing France
Paralympic Games
Silver medal – second place	1988 Seoul	800 metres - 1C
Silver medal – second place	1992 Barcelona	100 metres - TW2
Bronze medal – third place	1992 Barcelona	800 metres - TW2
Bronze medal – third place	2000 Sydney	100 metres - T52

Florence Sireau-Gossiaux (born 25 May 1966) is a paralympic athlete from France competing mainly in category T52 sprint events.

== Biography ==
Gossiaux first competed in the Paralympics in 1988 in the 100m, 200m, 400m, 800m and 1500m winning a silver in the 800m. At the next games in 1992 she again competed in the 100m, 200m 400m and 800m and this time won a silver in the 100m and a bronze in 800m. After missing the 1996 games she next competed in the 2000 Summer Paralympics in the 100m winning a bronze medal and the 300m and 400m.
