= Liu Jing (table tennis) =

Chinese para table tennis player

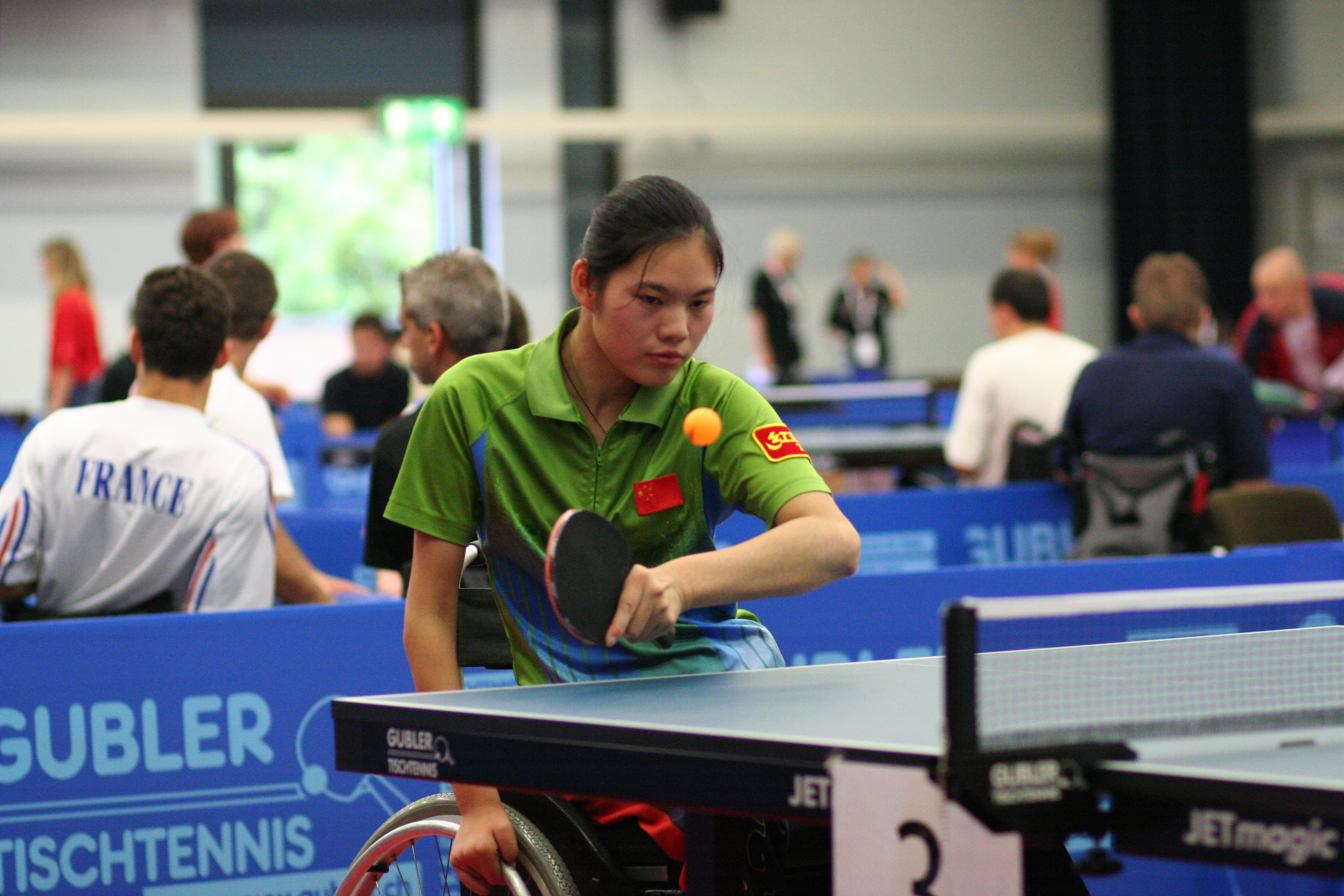
- Liu at the 2006 World Para Table Tennis Championships

Personal information
- Born: July 25, 1988 (age 38) Pizhou, Jiangsu, China
- Height: 161 cm (5 ft 3 in)
- Weight: 46 kg (101 lb)

Sport
- Sport: Table tennis
- Playing style: Left-handed shakehand grip
- Disability class: 2 (formerly 1)
- Highest ranking: 1 (October 2008)
- Current ranking: 2 (February 2020)
Medal record
Women's para table tennis
Representing China
Paralympic Games
Gold medal – first place	2008 Beijing	Singles C1–2
Gold medal – first place	2008 Beijing	Teams C1–3
Gold medal – first place	2012 London	Singles C1–2
Gold medal – first place	2012 London	Teams C1–3
Gold medal – first place	2016 Rio de Janeiro	Singles C1–2
Gold medal – first place	2016 Rio de Janeiro	Teams C1–3
Gold medal – first place	2020 Tokyo	Singles C1–2
Gold medal – first place	2020 Tokyo	Teams C1-3
Gold medal – first place	2024 Paris	Doubles WD5
Silver medal – second place	2024 Paris	Singles C1–2
World Championships
Gold medal – first place	2006 Montreux	Teams C1–3
Gold medal – first place	2010 Gwangju	Singles C1–2
Gold medal – first place	2010 Gwangju	Teams C1–3
Gold medal – first place	2014 Beijing	Singles C1–2
Gold medal – first place	2014 Beijing	Teams C1–3
Asian Para Games
Gold medal – first place	2010 Guangzhou	Teams C1–3
Gold medal – first place	2014 Incheon	Singles C1–2
Gold medal – first place	2014 Incheon	Teams C1–3
Silver medal – second place	2010 Guangzhou	Singles C1–3
Silver medal – second place	2022 Hangzhou	Singles C1–2
FESPIC Games
Gold medal – first place	2006 Kuala Lumpur	Singles C1–2
Asian Championships
Gold medal – first place	2005 Kuala Lumpur	Single C1–3
Gold medal – first place	2007 Seoul	Singles C1–2
Gold medal – first place	2007 Seoul	Teams C1–3
Gold medal – first place	2009 Amman	Singles C1–2
Gold medal – first place	2009 Amman	Teams C1–3
Gold medal – first place	2011 Hong Kong	Singles C1–2
Gold medal – first place	2013 Beijing	Singles C1–2
Gold medal – first place	2013 Beijing	Teams C1–3
Gold medal – first place	2015 Amman	Teams C1–3
Gold medal – first place	2019 Taichung	Singles C1–2
Silver medal – second place	2015 Amman	Singles C1–2

Liu Jing
- Traditional Chinese: 劉靜
- Simplified Chinese: 刘静
Transcriptions
Standard Mandarin
- Hanyu Pinyin: Liú Jìng

Liu Jing (Chinese: 刘静, born 25 July 1988) is a Chinese para table tennis player. She has won multiple gold medals in most para table tennis world championship tournaments. She has played with Li Qian and Xue Juan in the team events internationally. She has won eight gold medals at the Summer Paralympics.

== Career ==
She has won the ITTF Star Award in 2016 after successfully retaining her Paralympic table tennis titles in Rio de Janeiro.

== Personal life ==
Like many of her teammates, Liu was a polio victim from Pizhou who attended New Hope Center as a child. That's where coach Heng Xin developed her into a star.
