= Dorota Bucław =

Polish para table tennis player

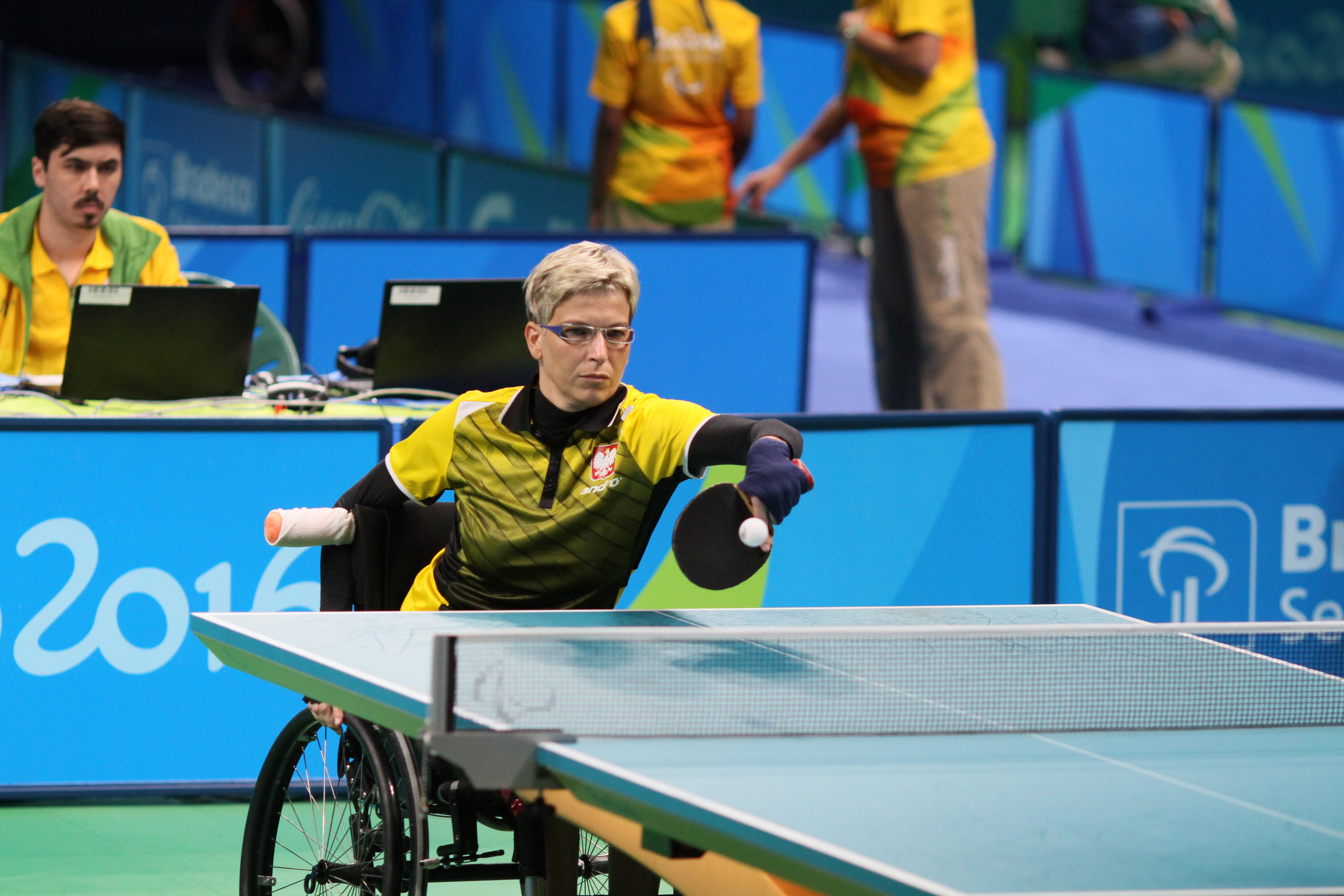
- Bucław at 2016 Summer Paralympics

Personal information
- Born: 16 October 1977 (age 48) Bydgoszcz, Poland
- Height: 1.73 m (5 ft 8 in)

Sport
- Country: Poland
- Sport: Para table tennis
- Disability: Spinal cord injury
- Disability class: C1
Medal record
Para table tennis
Representing Poland
Paralympic Games
Bronze medal – third place	2024 Paris	Singles WS1-2
World Championships
Bronze medal – third place	2018 Lasko	Singles C1-2
European Championships
Gold medal – first place	2019 Helsingborg	Singles C1
Silver medal – second place	2017 Lasko	Singles C1-2
Bronze medal – third place	2013 Lignano	Singles C1-2

Dorota Bucław (born 16 October 1977) is a Polish para table tennis player who competes at international table tennis competitions. She is a World bronze medalist and a European champion, she has also competed at the 2012 and 2016 Summer Paralympics and has been selected to compete at the 2020 Summer Paralympics.

In 1994, Bucław was playing basketball with a friend and her friend pressed her body against a wall, she pulled her neck which caused nerve damage and has affected the use of her right hand. Five years later, she broke her neck following an accident at a level crossing.
