= Fatemah Al-Azzam =

Jordanian para table tennis player

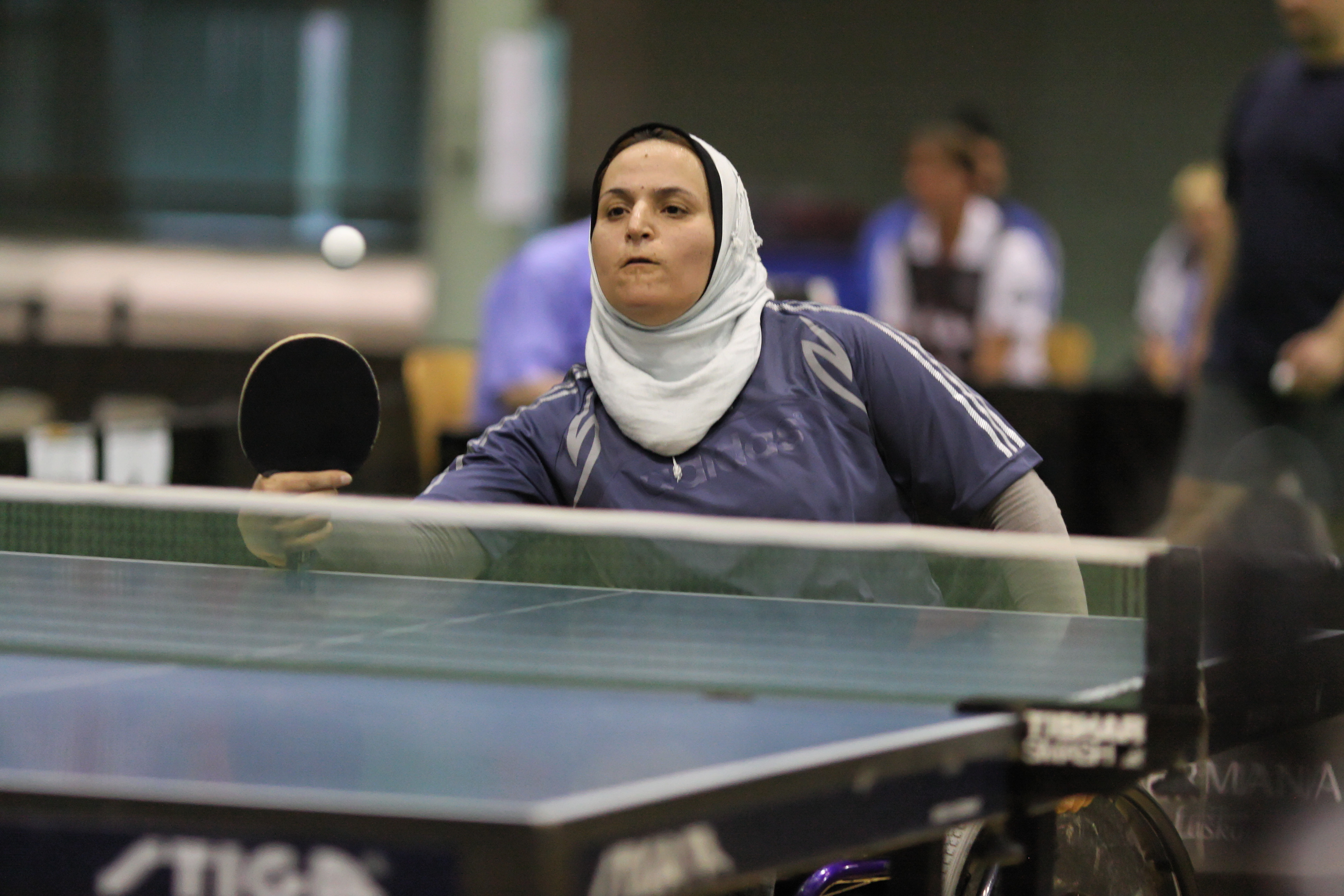
- Al-Azzam in 2012

Personal information
- Born: 28 December 1976 (age 49)

Sport
- Sport: Para table tennis
Medal record
Representing Jordan
Paralympic Games
Bronze medal – third place	2004 Athens	Teams C4-5
Bronze medal – third place	2008 Beijing	Teams C4-5
World Championships
Gold medal – first place	2006 Montreux	Teams C4
Asian Championships
Gold medal – first place	2003 Amman	Singles C4
Gold medal – first place	2003 Amman	Teams C1-4
Gold medal – first place	2003 Amman	Open singles
Gold medal – first place	2005 Cairo	Teams C1-5
Silver medal – second place	1999 Johannesburg	Open singles
Silver medal – second place	2005 Cairo	Open singles
Silver medal – second place	2005 Cairo	Singles C4
Silver medal – second place	2009 Amman	Teams C4-5
Bronze medal – third place	2007 Seoul	Teams C4-5
Bronze medal – third place	2011 Hong Kong	Teams C4-5
Bronze medal – third place	2013 Beijing	Teams C4-5
Bronze medal – third place	2015 Amman	Singles C4
Bronze medal – third place	2015 Amman	Teams C4-5
Asian Para Games
Bronze medal – third place	2014 Incheon	Teams C4-5

Fatemah Al-Azzam (born 28 December 1976) is a Jordanian para table tennis player who competes in international table tennis competitions. She is a double Paralympic bronze medalist, World champion, four-time Asian champion and Asian Para Games bronze medalist in both singles and teams events alongside Khetam Abuawad and Maha Al-Bargouthi.
