= Imad Gharbawi =

Jordanian Paralympic athlete

Medal record

Paralympic athletics

Representing Jordan

Paralympic Games
Silver medal – second place	1996 Atlanta	Discus Throw - F52

Imad Gharbawi is a paralympic athlete from Jordan competing mainly in category F52 discus events.

Imad competed in the F52 discus finishing second behind Abdolreza Jokar who broke the world record.
