= Geneviève Clot =

French Paralympic athlete

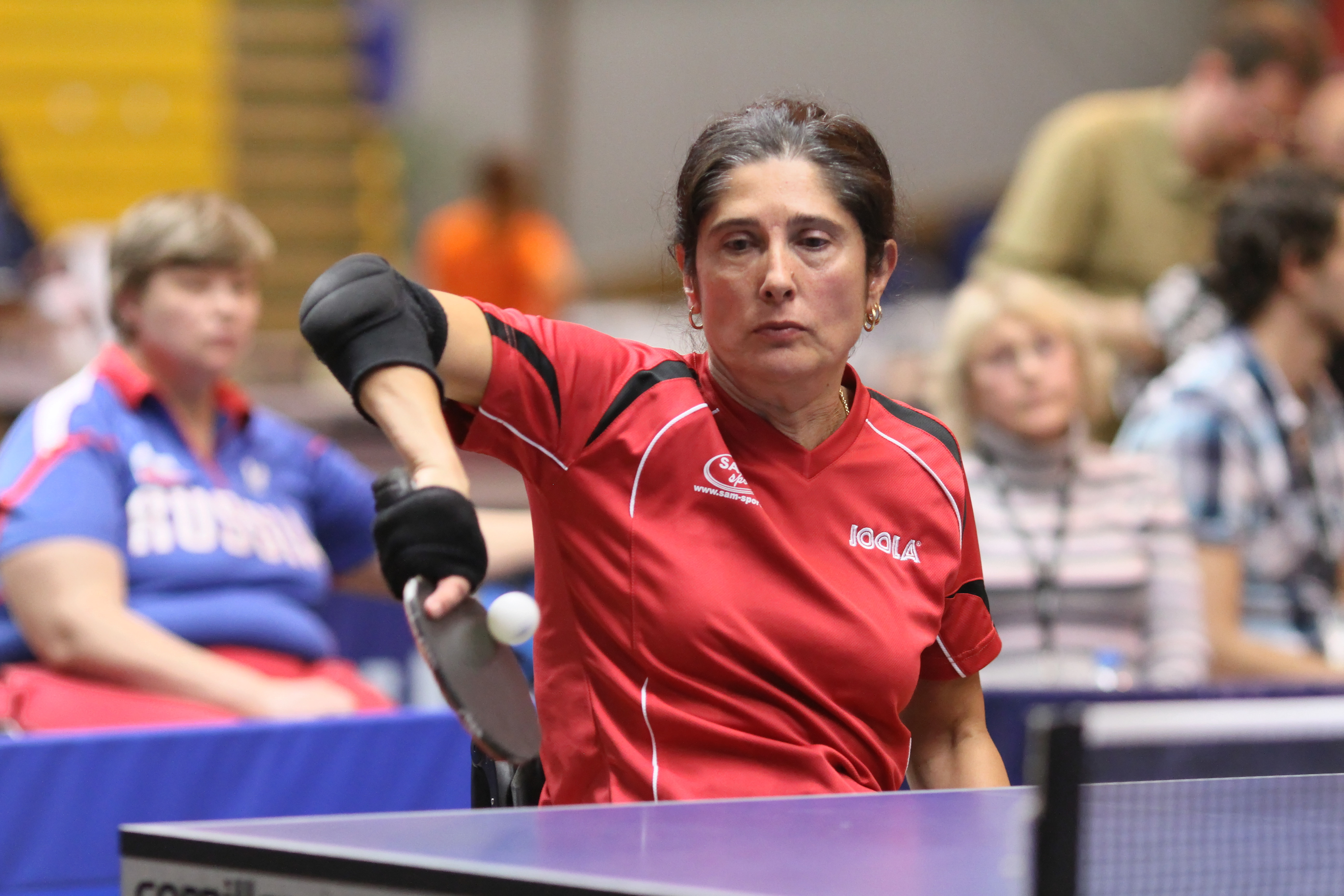
- Clot at 2006 World Championships

Personal information
- Born: 29 January 1964 (age 62) Marseille, France

Sport
- Country: France
- Sport: Para table tennis
- Disability: Tetraplegia
- Disability class: C2
- Retired: 2017
Medal record
Para table tennis
Representing France
Paralympic Games
Gold medal – first place	2004 Athens	Women's team C1-3
Silver medal – second place	2004 Athens	Women's singles C1-2
World Championships
Gold medal – first place	2002 Taipei	Women's team C1-3
Silver medal – second place	2002 Taipei	Women's singles C1-2
Silver medal – second place	2006 Montreux	Women's singles C1-2
European Championships
Gold medal – first place	2001 Frankfurt	Women's team C2-3
Gold medal – first place	2003 Zagreb	Women's team C1-3
Silver medal – second place	2003 Zagreb	Women's singles C2
Silver medal – second place	2005 Jesolo	Women's teams C1-3
Paralympic swimming
World Para Swimming Championships
Silver medal – second place	1994 Malta	Women's 50m backstroke S5

Geneviève Clot (born 29 January 1964) is a former French para table tennis player and swimmer, she has participated in international level in both sports.
