= Tharwat Alhajjaj =

Jordanian Paralympic weightlifter

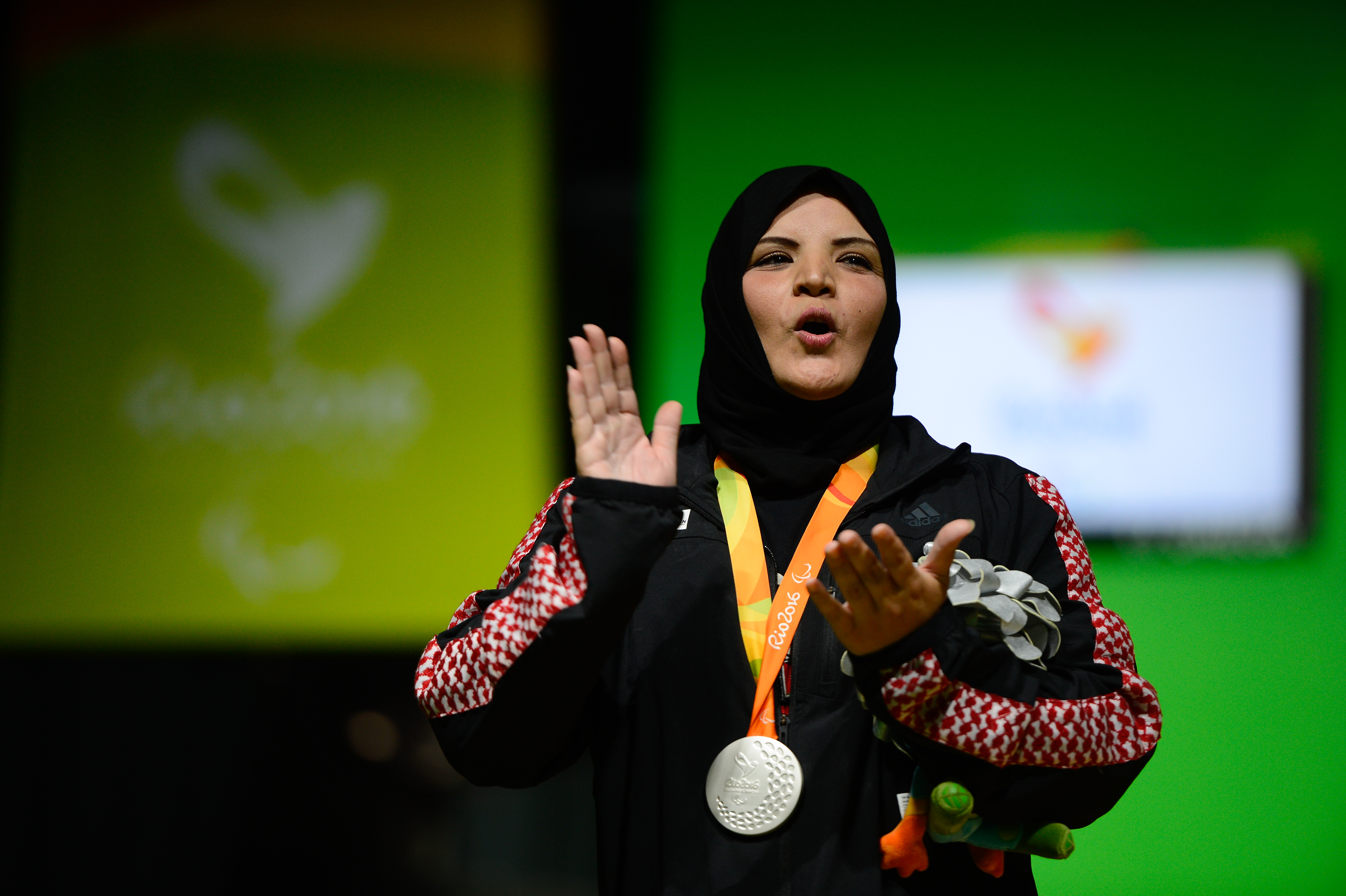
- Alhajaj at the 2016 Paralympic Games

Personal information
- Full name: Tharwh Tayseer Hamdan Alhajaj
- Born: 1 January 1973 (age 53) Amman, Jordan

Sport
- Country: Jordan
- Sport: Paralympic powerlifting
Medal record
Representing Jordan
Paralympic Games
Silver medal – second place	2016 Rio de Janeiro	86 kg
Asian Para Games
Silver medal – second place	2022 Hangzhou	86 kg

Tharwat Alhajjaj (Arabic: ثروت الحجاج, born 1 January 1973), also known as Tharwat Al Hajjaj or Tharwah Al Hajaj or Tharwh Tayseer Hamdan Alhajaj, is an Olympic weightlifting champion from Jordan. She represented Jordan in the 2016 Summer Paralympics held in Rio de Janeiro and won a Powerlifting silver. The 43-year-old lifted 119 kg in the women's 86 kg category to take silver behind Egypt's Randa Mahmoud who lifted 130 kg for gold. Bronze went to Mexico's Catalina Diaz Vilchis who managed 117 kg. Tharwat also participated in the Asian Paralympics in 2014 and won a powerlifting silver in the women's 77 kg category, where she lifted 108 kg.

== Results ==
Powerlifting at the 2020 Summer Paralympics – Women's 86 kg

Powerlifting at the 2016 Summer Paralympics – Women's 86 kg

POWERLIFTING

Rank Event Year Location Result

Paralympic Games

2 –86 kg 2016 Rio de Janeiro, BRA 119

World Championships

5 –79 kg 2014 Dubai, UAE 114.0

6 –86 kg 2019 Nur-Sultan, KAZ 127.0

6 –86 kg 2017 Mexico City, MEX 117.0

9 –75 kg 2010 Kuala Lumpur, MAS 92.5

ATHLETICS

Rank Event Year Location Result

Paralympic Games

8 Women's Discus Throw F42-46 2004 Athens, GRE 21.40

13 Women's Discus Throw F57/58 2008 Beijing, CHN 23.05

World Championships

9 Women's Discus Throw F42/44 2006 Assen, NED 20.36
