= Maha Al-Bargouthi =

Jordanian para table tennis player

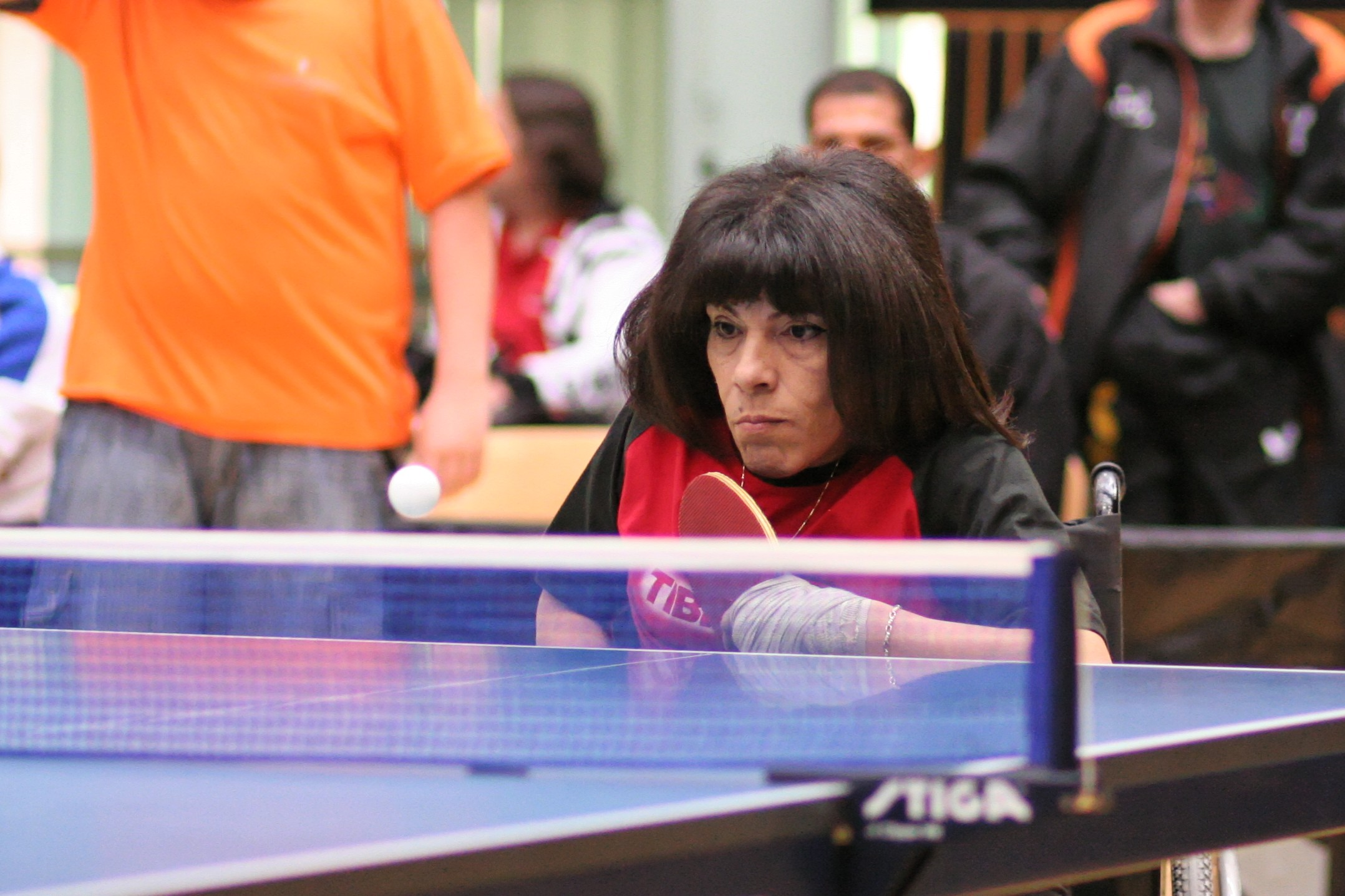
- Al-Bargouthi in 2009

Personal information
- Nickname: Moter Teresa
- Nationality: Jordanian
- Born: 23 February 1962 Amman, Jordan
- Died: 6 December 2022 (aged 60)

Sport
- Country: Jordan
- Sport: Para table tennis
- Disability: Paraplegia
- Disability class: C1
- Club: Al-Mustaqbal
- Retired: 2017
Medal record
Para table tennis
Representing Jordan
Paralympic Games
Gold medal – first place	2000 Sydney	Singles class 1-2
Bronze medal – third place	2004 Athens	Teams class 4-5
World Championships
Silver medal – second place	1990 Assen	Singles class 1-2
Pan Arab Games
Gold medal – first place	1999 Amman	Singles class 1-3
Asian Championships
Bronze medal – third place	2007 Seoul	Teams class 1-3
Silver medal – second place	2009 Amman	Singles class 1-2
Silver medal – second place	2011 Hong Kong	Singles class 1-2
Silver medal – second place	2013 Beijing	Singles class 1-2

Maha Al-Bargouthi (23 February 1962 – 6 December 2022) was a Jordanian para table tennis player who competed in five Paralympic Games and won three Paralympic medals. She was voted Jordan's top sportsperson in 2002.

== Sporting career ==
=== Paralympics ===
Al Bargouthi's attended her first Paralympic Games in 2000 where she won her country's first ever gold medal in table tennis, she competed in the singles event class 1-2. She won her match against Lynne Riding of Great Britain but lost to France's Isabelle Lafaye Marziou, she later went on to beat Catherine Mitton in the semifinals and advanced to gain Jordan's first and only gold medal in the Paralympics.

In 2004, she competed alongside Khetam Abuawad and Fatemah Al Azzam, the 2004 Summer Paralympics were Abuawad and Al Azzam's first Paralympics. Al Bargouthi lost her two games in the group play against Genevieve Clot and Catherine Mitton but didn't succeed to the later rounds while Al Azzam succeeded through to the quarterfinals but Abuawad wasn't fortunate and lost her two games as well. However, the women's team were triumphant in the women's team class 4-5. The three women were qualified in second place after losing in straight sets to Chinese Taipei and closely won against Germany. In the quarterfinals, they competed against Slovakia and narrowly won three sets to two and continued onto the semifinals. They encountered reigning champions China who were aiming to win their second consecutive gold medal in the teams event, sadly Al Barghouti's team lost to China in straight sets but were hopeful in getting a bronze medal: this was Al Barghouti's second medal and Abuawad and Al Azzam's first medal. They were up against France where they successfully won the bronze medal, this was Jordan's second medal in table tennis.

Al Bargouthi only competed in the singles event class 1-2 in the 2008 Summer Paralympics while Abuawad and Al Azzam were aiming to win their second medal in their second Paralympic Games. During group play, Al Barghouti lost her group play matches again like the previous games: she lost to Isabelle Lafaye-Marziou and Narges Khazaei of Iran.

During the 2012 Summer Paralympics, Al Bargouthi was in last place once more in the group play after losing to Lafaye-Marziou and Ireland's Rena McCarron Rooney. Al Bargouthi's fifth and last Paralympic Games were in 2016 Summer Paralympics in Rio de Janeiro and was again unlucky in the two matches against McCarron Rooney and China's Liu Jing.

== Major tournaments ==
=== First table tennis titles ===
Al Bargouthi's first table tennis medal was a silver medal in the World Para Table Tennis Championships in 1990 in Assen, she later went on to earn more medals. Her first major title was winning the singles event in the Pan Arab Games where she won her first ever title in 1999 after defeating fellow Jordanian table tennis player Samira Al Hadawi. She earned her first medal, a bronze, in the teams event in 2002 in the World Team Cup in Roermund along with Al Hadawi and Khetam Abuawad, in the same year, she won her first gold medal in the teams event in the King Hussein Memorial Tournament in her hometown, Amman with Abuawad and Fatmeh Al Azzam by beating France to earn the title. Al Barghouti won two more gold medals in the singles events in the T.T. International Master Italians Open and Misr International Tournament in both classes 1-2.

=== 2006 to 2008 ===
She attended the Liverpool Open in March 2006 and gained a bronze medal, she also went to her second international open in Lignano in August/September 2006 and earned a gold medal, both events were in the singles class 1-2. In 2007, she took a bronze medal in the Jordan Open TT Championships in the singles class 1-2 and won a silver medal in the teams class 1-3 in the Hong Kong Open with Samira Al Hadawi.

In 2008, she earned four medals: one gold and three bronzes. She won her second medal in the Liverpool Open in March alongside Abuawad and Al Azzam, she attended the Al Watani Championships in Amman and won the bronze medal in the women's wheelchair open, her other competitors won medals in the same open event too: Abuawad won the title while Al Azzam won silver medal. The women went on to win their second team title in the Polish Open in May 2008 where they defeated Borislava Peric and Nada Matic from Serbia. Later in June 2006, Al Bargouthi won the bronze medal at the Romania Open.

=== Retirement ===
Al Bargouthi announced that she would retire in her sporting career in February 2017, she officially retired two months later on 20 April 2017 in a retirement ceremony under Prince Raad's patronage.
