= Abdelkareem Khattab =

Jordanian Paralympic powerlifter

Personal information
- Born: 4 August 1991 (age 34) Zarqa, Jordan

Sport
- Country: Jordan
- Sport: Paralympic powerlifting
Medal record
Paralympic Games
| Gold medal – first place | 2020 Tokyo | 88 kg |
| Gold medal – first place | 2024 Paris | 97 kg |
World Championships
| Gold medal – first place | 2021 Tbilisi | 88 kg |
| Bronze medal – third place | 2017 Mexico City | 80 kg |
| Bronze medal – third place | 2019 Nur-Sultan | 88 kg |
Asian Para Games
| Gold medal – first place | 2014 Incheon | 72 kg |
| Gold medal – first place | 2022 Hangzhou | 88 kg |

Abdelkareem Mohmmad Ahmad Khattab (born 4 August 1991) is a Jordanian Paralympic powerlifter. He won the gold medal in the men's 88 kg event at the 2020 Summer Paralympics held in Tokyo, Japan. He also set a new Paralympic record of 231 kg. A few months later, he won the gold medal in his event at the 2021 World Para Powerlifting Championships held in Tbilisi, Georgia. He also set a new world record of 250 kg.

== Career ==
He competed in the men's 72 kg event at the 2016 Summer Paralympics held in Rio de Janeiro, Brazil without a successful lift. In 2017, he won the bronze medal in the men's 80 kg event at the World Para Powerlifting Championships held in Mexico City, Mexico. At the 2018 Asia-Oceania Open Powerlifting Championships held in Kitakyushu, Japan, he won the silver medal in his event.

At the 2019 World Para Powerlifting Championships held in Nur-Sultan, Kazakhstan, he won the bronze medal in the men's 88 kg event. A month before the 2020 Summer Paralympics, he won the gold medal in his event at the Dubai 2021 Para Powerlifting World Cup held in Dubai, United Arab Emirates. He also set a new world record of 237 kg in his third attempt which he then improved to 240 kg in his fourth lift. In December 2021, he set a new world record of 250 kg at the World Para Powerlifting Championships held in Tbilisi, Georgia.

== Results ==
| Year | Venue | Weight | Attempts (kg) | | | | Total | Rank |
| Year | Venue | Weight | 1 | 2 | 3 | 4 | Total | Rank |
Summer Paralympics
| 2016 | Rio de Janeiro, Brazil | 72 kg | ~~210~~ | ~~210~~ | ~~215~~ | – | – | NM |
| 2021 | Tokyo, Japan | 88 kg | 220 | 225 | 231 PR | – | 231 | 1st place, gold medalist(s) |
World Championships
| 2017 | Mexico City, Mexico | 80 kg | 210 | 217 | 221 | – | 221 | 3rd place, bronze medalist(s) |
| 2019 | Nur-Sultan, Kazakhstan | 88 kg | ~~205~~ | 207 | 213 | – | 213 | 3rd place, bronze medalist(s) |
| 2021 | Tbilisi, Georgia | 88 kg | 230 | 238 | ~~242~~ | 250 WR | 238 | 1st place, gold medalist(s) |
