= Catherine Mitton =

British para table tennis player

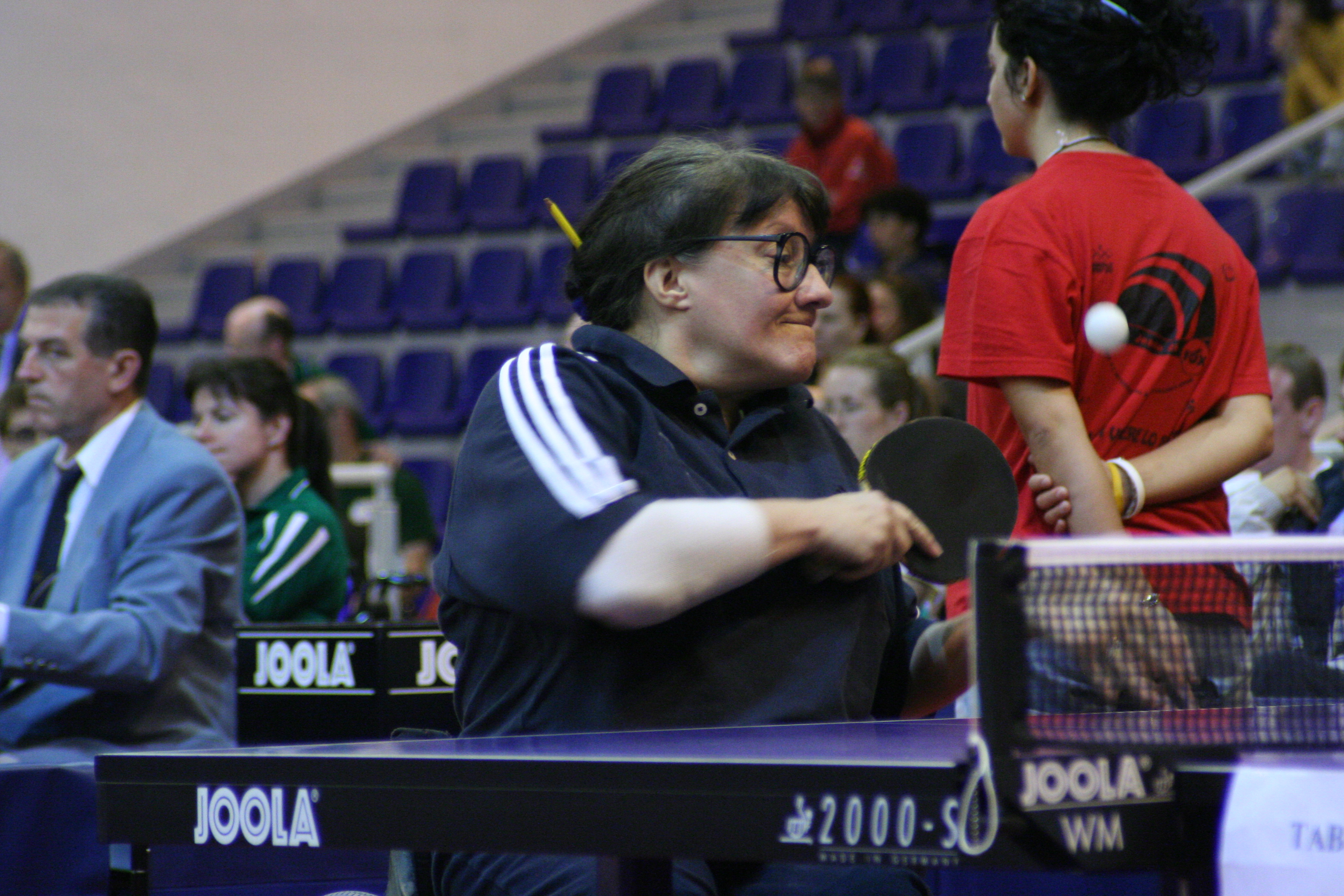
- Mitton at the 2005 Para Table Tennis European Championship in Jesolo (Italy), 15–26 September 2005

Personal information
- Nickname: Cathy
- Nationality: British
- Born: 30 November 1956 (age 69)
- Home town: Dewsbury, England, United Kingdom

Sport
- Country: United Kingdom
- Sport: Para table tennis
- Disability class: C2
- Retired: 2011
Medal record
Para table tennis
Representing United Kingdom
Paralympic Games
Bronze medal – third place	2000 Sydney	Women's singles C1-2
Bronze medal – third place	2004 Athens	Women's singles C1-2
World Championships
Gold medal – first place	2002 Taipei	Women's singles C1-2
Silver medal – second place	1998 Paris	Women's singles C1-2
Silver medal – second place	2002 Taipei	Women's teams C1-3
Bronze medal – third place	2006 Montreux	Women's singles C1-2
Bronze medal – third place	2010 Gwangju	Women's teams C1-3
European Championships
Gold medal – first place	1999 Piešťany	Women's singles C2
Silver medal – second place	1997 Stockholm	Women's singles C1-2
Silver medal – second place	2001 Frankfurt	Women's singles C1-2
Silver medal – second place	2005 Gesolo	Women's singles C1-2
Bronze medal – third place	2003 Zagreb	Women's singles C2
Bronze medal – third place	2007 Kranjska Gora	Women's singles C2
Bronze medal – third place	2007 Kranjska Gora	Women's teams C2-3
Bronze medal – third place	2009 Genoa	Women's singles C1-2
Representing England
Commonwealth Games
Bronze medal – third place	2002 Manchester	Women's singles C2-5
Bronze medal – third place	2006 Melbourne	Women's singles C1-5

Catherine "Cathy" Mitton (born 30 November 1956) is a former para table tennis player who represented Great Britain. She has won team events with Sara Head and Lynne Riding.
