= Jamil Elshebli =

Jordanian Paralympic athlete (born 1979)

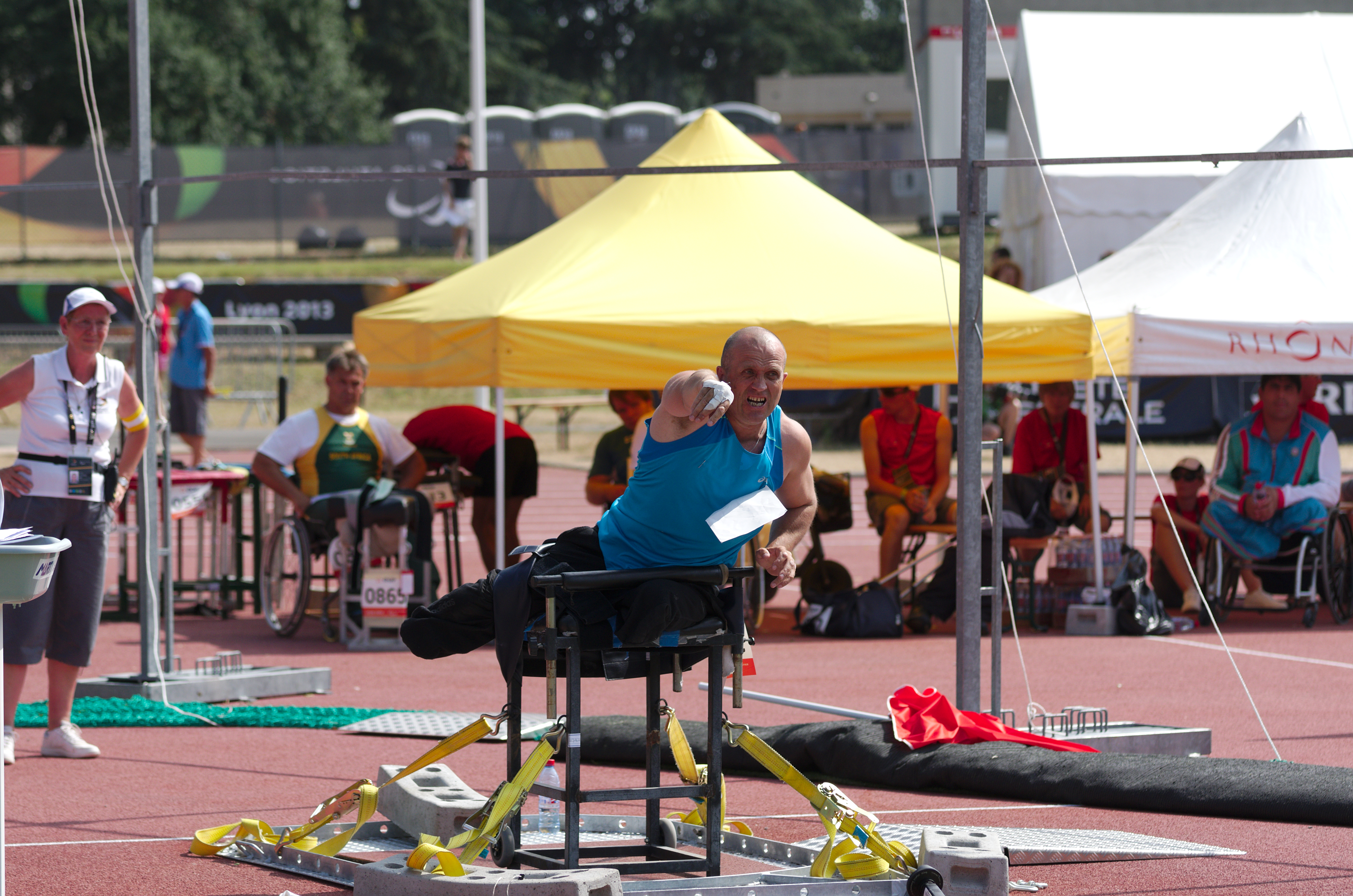
- Elshebli at the 2013 World Championships

Personal information
- Born: 9 April 1979 (age 47)

Sport
- Sport: Paralympic athletics Paralympic powerlifting
Medal record
Representing Jordan
Paralympic athletics
Paralympic Games
Silver medal – second place	2004 Athens	Shot put F57
Silver medal – second place	2008 Beijing	Shot put F57-58
Asian Para Games
Gold medal – first place	2010 Guangzhou	Shot put F57-58
Powerlifting
Paralympic Games
Gold medal – first place	2020 Tokyo	+107 kg
Bronze medal – third place	2016 Rio de Janeiro	+107 kg
Asian Para Games
Bronze medal – third place	2022 Hangzhou	+107 kg

Jamil Elshebli (born 9 April 1979) is a Paralympian athlete from Jordan competing mainly in category F57 shot put events but also in powerlifting.

== Career ==
He competed in the 2004 Summer Paralympics where he won a silver in the shot put, he followed this up in the 2008 Summer Paralympics in Beijing, China where he won a second silver medal in the men's F57-58 shot put. In the 2016 Summer Paralympics in Rio de Janeiro, Brazil he won bronze medal in the men's +107 kg powerlifting. In the 2020 Summer Paralympics in Tokyo, Japan he won the gold medal in the men's +107 kg powerlifting.
