= Powerlifting at the 2020 Summer Paralympics – Qualification =

Qualification for powerlifting at the 2020 Summer Paralympics began on 25 May 2018 and finished on 27 June 2021. There were 180 powerlifters (80 male, 80 female and 20 gender free) competing in 20 events (10 male, 10 female).

== Timeline ==
World Para Powerlifting Qualification Pathway 2017-2020	Date	Venue
2017 World Para Powerlifting Championships	2 – 8 December 2017	Mexico City
2018 World Para Powerlifting European Open Championships	25 – 29 May 2018	(France) Berck
2018 World Para Powerlifting African Championships	10 – 12 August 2018	(Algeria) Algiers
2018 World Para Powerlifting Asia-Oceania Open Championships	8 – 12 September 2018	(Japan) Kitakyushu
2018 World Para Powerlifting Americas Open Championships	6 – 9 December 2018	(Colombia) Bogotá
2019 World Para Powerlifting Championships	12 – 20 July 2019	(Kazakhstan) Nur-Sultan

== Quotas ==
A qualification slot is allocated to the individual athlete not to the NPC:

- An NPC can allocated no more than eight male and female slots with a maximum of one powerlifter per medal event. Exceptions may be granted through the Bipartite Invitation Commission Allocation method.
- An athlete can only be eligible to compete if they complete the requirements set out in the World Para Powerlifting Qualification Pathway 2017-2020 or have achieved an MQS (Minimum Qualification Standard).

=== Minimum Qualification Standard targets ===
Men's Events	MQS	Women's Events	MQS
-49 kg	105 kg	-41 kg	57 kg
-54 kg	115 kg	-45 kg	60 kg
-59 kg	125 kg	-50 kg	62 kg
-65 kg	135 kg	-55 kg	65 kg
-72 kg	142 kg	-61 kg	67 kg
-80 kg	150 kg	-67 kg	70 kg
-88 kg	157 kg	-73 kg	72 kg
-97 kg	165 kg	-79 kg	77 kg
107 kg	172 kg	-86 kg	82 kg
+107 kg	180 kg	+86 kg	87 kg

== Summary ==
NPC	Men										Women										Total
NPC	49	54	59	65	72	80	88	97	107	+107	41	45	50	55	61	67	73	79	86	+86	Total
Algeria	X			X								X									3
Azerbaijan	X							X	X	X											4
Brazil	X	X				X	X				X						X		X		7
Cameroon												X									1
Chile			X	X										X					X		4
China			X	X	X	X	X	X			X	X	X	X		X	X		X	X	14
Chinese Taipei															X						1
Colombia						X		X		X	X										4
Cuba							X				X										2
Cyprus																X					1
Dominican Republic				X																	1
Egypt		X	X		X	X	X	X		X			X	X	X	X	X	X	X	X	15
El Salvador			X																		1
France		X															X				2
Georgia						X			X												2
Ghana					X																1
Great Britain			X		X						X		X						X		5
Greece		X	X			X				X											4
Hungary							X														1
India				X									X								2
Indonesia											X										1
Iran				X		X		X	X	X											5
Iraq		X			X				X	X									X	X	6
Ireland																	X				1
Israel																				X	1
Italy						X															1
Ivory Coast				X																	1
Japan (H)	X		X		X													X			4
Jordan	X			X			X	X		X								X	X		7
Kazakhstan		X					X					X	X			X					5
Kenya											X										1
Malaysia					X				X												2
Mexico									X				X		X					X	4
Moldova								X									X				2
Mongolia									X												1
Morocco													X	X				X			3
Nigeria	X		X		X							X			X	X	X	X	X	X	10
Panama					X																1
Peru			X																		1
Philippines												X									1
Poland	X		X	X								X				X				X	6
RPC																	X	X			2
Serbia								X													1
Singapore												X									1
South Korea		X								X						X			X	X	5
Spain													X					X			2
Syria											X				X						2
Thailand				X	X										X						3
Turkey	X											X		X	X		X				5
Ukraine		X				X					X		X	X	X	X		X			8
United Arab Emirates							X							X							2
United States									X												1
Uzbekistan							X		X						X						3
Venezuela											X	X		X							3
Vietnam	X													X							2
Total NPCs: 55	9	8	10	10	10	9	9	8	9	8	10	10	9	9	9	8	9	8	9	8	179

== Qualified slots ==
Top ranked eight male and female powerlifters are automatically qualified to compete for their respective bodyweight category, as of 27 June 2021.

=== Men ===
Weight category	Slots allocated	NPC	Qualified powerlifter
-49 kg	9	Nigeria	Yakubu Adesokan
-49 kg	9	Jordan	Omar Qarada
-49 kg	9	Turkey	Abdullah Kayapinar
-49 kg	9	Azerbaijan	Parvin Mammadov
-49 kg	9	Vietnam	Le Van Cong
-49 kg	9	Algeria	Hadj Ahmed Beyour
-49 kg	9	Brazil	Joao Maria Franca Junior
-49 kg	9	Japan	Hiroshi Miura
-49 kg	9	Poland	Slawomir Szymanski
-54 kg	8	Kazakhstan	David Degtyarev
-54 kg	8	Egypt	Taha Abdelmajid
-54 kg	8	Greece	Dimitrios Bakochristos
-54 kg	8	Brazil	Bruno Carra
-54 kg	8	France	Axel Bourlon
-54 kg	8	Ukraine	Kostiantyn Panasiuk
-54 kg	8	Iraq	Ali Al-Darraji
-54 kg	8	South Korea	Choi Keun Jin
-59 kg	10	Egypt	Sherif Osman
-59 kg	10	China	Qi Yongka
-59 kg	10	Chile	Juan Carlos Garrido
-59 kg	10	El Salvador	Herbert Aceituno
-59 kg	10	Greece	Paschalis Kouloumoglou
-59 kg	10	Nigeria	Ibrahim Dauda
-59 kg	10	Great Britain	Ali Jawad
-59 kg	10	Poland	Mariusz Tomczyk
-59 kg	10	Japan	Tomohiro Kose
-59 kg	10	Peru	Niel Garcia Trelles
-65 kg	10	China	Liu Lei
-65 kg	10	Iran	Amir Jafari
-65 kg	10	Algeria	Hocine Bettir
-65 kg	10	Chile	Jorge Carinao
-65 kg	10	Jordan	Mohammad Tarbash
-65 kg	10	India	Jai Deep
-65 kg	10	Thailand	Narong Kasunun
-65 kg	10	Poland	Grzegorz Lanzer
-65 kg	10	Ivory Coast	Adou Herve Ano
-65 kg	10	Dominican Republic	Jose Manuel Abud Coronado
-72 kg	10	Malaysia	Bonnie Bunyau Gustin
-72 kg	10	Iraq	Rasool Mohsin
-72 kg	10	China	Hu Peng
-72 kg	10	Nigeria	Nnamdi Innocent
-72 kg	10	Egypt	Mahmoud Attia
-72 kg	10	Great Britain	Micky Yule
-72 kg	10	Thailand	Thongsa Marasri
-72 kg	10	Japan	Hajime Ujiro
-72 kg	10	Ghana	Emmanuel Nii Tettey Oku
-72 kg	10	Panama	Rey Melchor Dimas Vasquez
-80 kg	9	Iran	Roohallah Rostami
-80 kg	9	China	Gu Xiaofei
-80 kg	9	Egypt	Mohamed Elelfat
-80 kg	9	Italy	Donato Telesca
-80 kg	9	Colombia	Francisco Palomeque
-80 kg	9	Greece	Gkremislav Moysiadis
-80 kg	9	Ukraine	Yurii Babynets
-80 kg	9	Brazil	Ailton Bento de Souza
-80 kg	9	Georgia	Ahmad Razm Azar
-88 kg	9	Jordan	Abdelkareem Khattab
-88 kg	9	China	Ye Jixiong
-88 kg	9	Egypt	Hany Abdelhady
-88 kg	9	United Arab Emirates	Mohammed Khamis Khalaf
-88 kg	9	Uzbekistan	Farhod Umirzakov
-88 kg	9	Cuba	Oniger Drake Vega
-88 kg	9	Brazil	Evanio Da Silva
-88 kg	9	Kazakhstan	Rakhmetzhan Khamayev
-88 kg	9	Hungary	Sedric Watchou
-97 kg	8	Iran	Seyedhamed Solhipouravanji
-97 kg	8	China	Yan Panpan
-97 kg	8	Colombia	Fabio Torres
-97 kg	8	Serbia	Petar Milenkovic
-97 kg	8	Egypt	Mohamed Ahmed
-97 kg	8	Azerbaijan	Nurlan Babajanov
-97 kg	8	Moldova	Denis Raiul
-97 kg	8	Jordan	Mutaz Aljuneidi
-107 kg	9	Mongolia	Sodnompiljee Enkhbayar
-107 kg	9	Malaysia	Yee Khie Jong
-107 kg	9	Iran	Saman Razi
-107 kg	9	Mexico	Jose De Jesus Castillo
-107 kg	9	Azerbaijan	Elshan Huseynov
-107 kg	9	Uzbekistan	Nuriddin Davlatov
-107 kg	9	Georgia	Akaki Jintcharadze
-107 kg	9	Iraq	Abbas Naisan
-107 kg	9	United States	Jacob Schrom
+107 kg	8	Iran	Mansour Pourmirzaei
+107 kg	8	Iraq	Faris Al-Ageeli
+107 kg	8	Jordan	Jamil Elshebli
+107 kg	8	Greece	Konstantinos Dimou
+107 kg	8	Azerbaijan	Shamo Aslanov
+107 kg	8	Colombia	Jhon Castaneda Velasquez
+107 kg	8	South Korea	Chun Keun Bae
+107 kg	8	Egypt	Amr Mosaad
Total	80		

=== Women ===
Weight category	Slots allocated	NPC	Qualified powerlifter
-41 kg	10	China	Guo Lingling
-41 kg	10	Indonesia	Ni Nengah Widiasih
-41 kg	10	Great Britain	Zoe Newson
-41 kg	10	Venezuela	Clara Fuentes Monasterio
-41 kg	10	Cuba	Leidy Rodriguez
-41 kg	10	Ukraine	Maryna Kopiika
-41 kg	10	Colombia	Cristina Poblador Granados
-41 kg	10	Syria	Noura Baddour
-41 kg	10	Brazil	Lara Aparecida de Lima
-41 kg	10	Kenya	Hellen Wawira Kariuki
-45 kg	10	Turkey	Nazmiye Muratli
-45 kg	10	Nigeria	Latifat Tijani
-45 kg	10	China	Cui Zhe
-45 kg	10	Poland	Justyna Kozdryk
-45 kg	10	Cameroon	Mimozette Nghamsi Fotie
-45 kg	10	Algeria	Samira Guerioua
-45 kg	10	Singapore	Nur Aini Mohamad Yasli
-45 kg	10	Kazakhstan	Alina Solodukhina
-45 kg	10	Venezuela	Oriana Del Carmen Teran Velazquez
-45 kg	10	~~Philippines~~	~~Achelle Guion~~
-50 kg	9	Egypt	Rehab Ahmed
-50 kg	9	China	Hu Dandan
-50 kg	9	Ukraine	Lidiia Soloviova
-50 kg	9	Great Britain	Olivia Broome
-50 kg	9	Spain	Loida Zabala Ollero
-50 kg	9	India	Sakina Khatun
-50 kg	9	Mexico	Mayra Alejandra Hernandez Godinez
-50 kg	9	Kazakhstan	Gulbanu Abdykhalykova
-50 kg	9	Morocco	Halima Lemtakhem
-55 kg	9	Ukraine	Mariana Shevchuk
-55 kg	9	China	Xiao Cuijuan
-55 kg	9	Turkey	Besra Duman
-55 kg	9	Venezuela	Wiunawis Nairobys Hernandez
-55 kg	9	United Arab Emirates	Mozag Alzeyoudi
-55 kg	9	Chile	Camila Campos
-55 kg	9	Morocco	Najat El Garraa
-55 kg	9	Egypt	Gihan Abdelaziz
-55 kg	9	Vietnam	Hoang Tuyet Loan Chau
-61 kg	9	Nigeria	Lucy Ejike
-61 kg	9	Mexico	Amalia Perez Vazquez
-61 kg	9	Uzbekistan	Ruza Kuzieva
-61 kg	9	Ukraine	Rayisa Toporkova
-61 kg	9	Egypt	Fatma Korany
-61 kg	9	Turkey	Yasemin Ceylan Baydar
-61 kg	9	Thailand	Somkhoun Anon
-61 kg	9	Syria	Fatema Alhasan
-61 kg	9	Chinese Taipei	Lin Ya-hsuan
-67 kg	8	China	Tan Yujiao
-67 kg	8	Egypt	Fatma Omar
-67 kg	8	Nigeria	Olaitan Ibrahim
-67 kg	8	Ukraine	Tetyana Shyrokolava
-67 kg	8	Kazakhstan	Raushan Koishibayeva
-67 kg	8	South Korea	Kim Hyeong Hui
-67 kg	8	Cyprus	Maria Markou
-67 kg	8	Poland	Paulina Przeywecka-Puziak
-73 kg	9	Brazil	Mariana D'Andrea
-73 kg	9	China	Xu Lili
-73 kg	9	France	Souhad Ghazouani
-73 kg	9	Nigeria	Paulina Okpala
-73 kg	9	Egypt	Amal Mahmoud
-73 kg	9	Turkey	Sibel Cam
-73 kg	9	RPC	Kheda Berieva
-73 kg	9	Ireland	Britney Arendse
-73 kg	9	Moldova	Larisa Marinenkova
-79 kg	10	Nigeria	Bose Omolayo
-79 kg	10	RPC	Vera Muratova
-79 kg	10	Ukraine	Nataliia Oliinyk
-79 kg	10	Egypt	Gehan Hassan
-79 kg	10	Chile	Maria Antonieta Ortiz
-79 kg	10	Spain	Maria Alcoba Membrilla
-79 kg	10	Jordan	Asma Issa
-79 kg	10	Japan	Chika Sakamoto
-79 kg	10	Morocco	Sanae Soubane
-79 kg	10	Turkmenistan	Mayagozel Ekeyeva
-86 kg	8	Nigeria	Folashade Oluwafemiayo
-86 kg	8	China	Zheng Feifei
-86 kg	8	Egypt	Amany Ali
-86 kg	8	Great Britain	Louise Sugden
-86 kg	8	Jordan	Tharwh Alhajaj
-86 kg	8	South Korea	Lee Youngsun
-86 kg	8	Brazil	Tayana Medeiros
-86 kg	8	Chile	Marion Serrano Guajardo
+86 kg	8	China	Deng Xuemei
+86 kg	8	Nigeria	Loveline Obiji
+86 kg	8	Egypt	Randa Mahmoud
+86 kg	8	Mexico	Perla Barcenas
+86 kg	8	Poland	Marzena Zięba
+86 kg	8	Israel	Polina Katsman
+86 kg	8	South Korea	Lee Hyunjung
+86 kg	8	Iraq	Huda Ali
Total	80		

== See also ==
- Weightlifting at the 2020 Summer Olympics – Qualification
