= Powerlifting at the 2016 Summer Paralympics – Qualification =

This article details the qualifying phase for Powerlifting at the 2016 Summer Paralympics. The competition at these Games will comprise a total of 180 athletes coming from their respective NPCs; each has been allowed to enter a maximum of 16 (eight for men, eight for women, and in either case, one per division). 140 will be awarded places based on world rankings in 2016, while 40 are made available to NPCs through a Bipartite Commission Invitation.

The top 8 men and top 6 women from the world rankings in each division earn a quota a place, always ensuring that the NPC is subjected to a limit of 1 lifter per division. If an NPC contains more than a single male athlete ranked in the top 8, or a single female in the top 6 of the world ranking list, the NPC can decide which of their athletes obtain the quota places

== Summary ==
NPC	Men										Women										Total
NPC	49 Kg	54 Kg	59 Kg	65 Kg	72 Kg	80 Kg	88 Kg	97 Kg	107 Kg	+107 Kg	41 Kg	45 Kg	50 Kg	55 Kg	61 Kg	67 Kg	73 Kg	79 Kg	86 Kg	+86 Kg	Total
Algeria				X																	1
Azerbaijan				X					X	X											3
Brazil		X					X														2
Chile			X																		1
China		X	X	X	X	X	X	X	X		X	X	X	X	X	X		X	X		16
Chinese Taipei															X			X			2
Colombia						X															1
Ivory Coast		X																			1
Egypt			X	X	X	X	X	X	X	X	X	X	X			X	X	X	X	X	16
France	X																X				2
Great Britain			X	X								X		X							4
Greece		X	X	X					X	X											5
Hungary	X																				1
India	X																				1
Indonesia											X										1
Iran				X			X	X	X	X											5
Iraq					X			X													2
Jordan	X				X		X		X	X									X		6
Kazakhstan																X					1
Kyrgyzstan		X							X												2
Malaysia								X	X												2
Mexico						X		X					X	X				X	X		6
Mongolia							X														1
Netherlands																				X	1
Nigeria	X	X	X		X	X	X	X			X	X		X	X		X	X	X	X	15
Poland			X	X	X	X						X			X					X	7
Russia	X		X		X					X				X	X	X	X	X	X	X	11
South Africa															X						1
South Korea	X									X						X				X	4
Spain													X								1
Turkey						X					X					X					3
Turkmenistan					X												X				2
Ukraine		X						X			X	X	X	X	X		X				8
United Arab Emirates							X			X											2
Uzbekistan						X															1
Vietnam	X	X											X								3
Total NPCs	8	8	8	8	8	8	8	8	8	8	6	6	6	6	7	6	6	6	6	6	141

== Men's events ==
=== 49 Kg ===
Section	Places	NPC	Qualified lifter
World Ranking List (as of Feb 29, 2016)	8	Russia	Vladimir Balynetc
World Ranking List (as of Feb 29, 2016)	8	Nigeria	Yakubu Adesokan
World Ranking List (as of Feb 29, 2016)	8	Vietnam	Lê Văn Công
World Ranking List (as of Feb 29, 2016)	8	Jordan	Omar Qarada
World Ranking List (as of Feb 29, 2016)	8	India	Farman Basha
World Ranking List (as of Feb 29, 2016)	8	Hungary	Nandor Tunkel
World Ranking List (as of Feb 29, 2016)	8	South Korea	Choi Keun Jin
World Ranking List (as of Feb 29, 2016)	8	France	Patrick Ardon
Invitational	2		
Total	10		

=== 54 Kg ===
Section	Places	NPC	Qualified lifter
World Ranking List (as of Feb 29, 2016)	8	Nigeria	Roland Ezuruike
World Ranking List (as of Feb 29, 2016)	8	Vietnam	Nguyễn Bình An
World Ranking List (as of Feb 29, 2016)	8	Greece	Dimitrios Bakochristos
World Ranking List (as of Feb 29, 2016)	8	China	Wang Jian
World Ranking List (as of Feb 29, 2016)	8	Ivory Coast	Alidou Diamoutene
World Ranking List (as of Feb 29, 2016)	8	Brazil	Bruno Carra
World Ranking List (as of Feb 29, 2016)	8	Ukraine	Sergii Khvalinskyi
World Ranking List (as of Feb 29, 2016)	8	Kyrgyzstan	Esen Kaliev
Invitational	2		
Total	10		

=== 59 Kg ===
Section	Places	NPC	Qualified lifter
World Ranking List (as of Feb 29, 2016)	8	Egypt	Sherif Othman
World Ranking List (as of Feb 29, 2016)	8	Great Britain	Ali Jawad
World Ranking List (as of Feb 29, 2016)	8	Nigeria	Anthony Ulonnam
World Ranking List (as of Feb 29, 2016)	8	Chile	Juan Carlos Garrido
World Ranking List (as of Feb 29, 2016)	8	China	Yang Quanxi
World Ranking List (as of Feb 29, 2016)	8	Russia	Ildar Bedderdinov
World Ranking List (as of Feb 29, 2016)	8	Poland	Mariusz Tomczyk
World Ranking List (as of Feb 29, 2016)	8	Greece	Paschalis Kouloumoglou
Invitational	2		
Total	10		

=== 65 Kg ===
Section	Places	NPC	Qualified lifter
World Ranking List (as of Feb 29, 2016)	8	China	Hu Peng
World Ranking List (as of Feb 29, 2016)	8	Egypt	Shaaban Ibrahim
World Ranking List (as of Feb 29, 2016)	8	Algeria	Hocine Bettir
World Ranking List (as of Feb 29, 2016)	8	Iran	Hamzeh Mohammadi
World Ranking List (as of Feb 29, 2016)	8	Great Britain	Micky Yule
World Ranking List (as of Feb 29, 2016)	8	Poland	Grzegorz Lanzer
World Ranking List (as of Feb 29, 2016)	8	Greece	Nikolaos Gkountanis
World Ranking List (as of Feb 29, 2016)	8	Azerbaijan	Ahmad Razm Azar
Invitational	2		
Total	10		

=== 72 Kg ===
Section	Places	NPC	Qualified lifter
World Ranking List (as of Feb 29, 2016)	8	China	Liu Lei
World Ranking List (as of Feb 29, 2016)	8	Iraq	Rasool Mohsin
World Ranking List (as of Feb 29, 2016)	8	Egypt	Mohamed Elelfat
World Ranking List (as of Feb 29, 2016)	8	Jordan	Abdelkareem Mohmmad Khattab
World Ranking List (as of Feb 29, 2016)	8	Russia	Sergei Sychev
World Ranking List (as of Feb 29, 2016)	8	Nigeria	Nnamdi Innocent
World Ranking List (as of Feb 29, 2016)	8	Turkmenistan	Sergey Meladze
World Ranking List (as of Feb 29, 2016)	8	Poland	Marek Trykacz
Invitational	2		
Total	10		

=== 80 Kg ===
Section	Places	NPC	Qualified lifter
World Ranking List (as of Feb 29, 2016)	8	China	Gu Xiaofei
World Ranking List (as of Feb 29, 2016)	8	Egypt	Metwaly Mathana
World Ranking List (as of Feb 29, 2016)	8	Colombia	Jainer Rafael Cantillo
World Ranking List (as of Feb 29, 2016)	8	Mexico	Porfirio Arredondo
World Ranking List (as of Feb 29, 2016)	8	Nigeria	Tolu-Lope Taiwo
World Ranking List (as of Feb 29, 2016)	8	Poland	Wawrzyniec Latus
World Ranking List (as of Feb 29, 2016)	8	Uzbekistan	Akhror Bozorov
World Ranking List (as of Feb 29, 2016)	8	Turkey	Izzettin Kanat
Invitational	2		
Total	10		

=== 88 Kg ===
Section	Places	NPC	Qualified lifter
World Ranking List (as of Feb 29, 2016)	8	Egypt	Hany Abdelhady
World Ranking List (as of Feb 29, 2016)	8	Iran	Seyedhamed Solhipouravanji
World Ranking List (as of Feb 29, 2016)	8	Jordan	Mutaz Zakaria Aljuneidi
World Ranking List (as of Feb 29, 2016)	8	United Arab Emirates	Mohammed Khamis Khalaf
World Ranking List (as of Feb 29, 2016)	8	China	Ye Jixiong
World Ranking List (as of Feb 29, 2016)	8	Mongolia	Sodnompiljee Enkhbayar
World Ranking List (as of Feb 29, 2016)	8	Nigeria	Opeyemi Jegede
World Ranking List (as of Feb 29, 2016)	8	Brazil	Evânio da Silva
Invitational	2		
Total	10		

=== 97 Kg ===
Section	Places	NPC	Qualified lifter
World Ranking List (as of Feb 29, 2016)	8	Egypt	Mohamed Eldib
World Ranking List (as of Feb 29, 2016)	8	Nigeria	Abdulazeez Ibrahim
World Ranking List (as of Feb 29, 2016)	8	China	Qi Dong
World Ranking List (as of Feb 29, 2016)	8	Mexico	José de Jesús Castillo
World Ranking List (as of Feb 29, 2016)	8	Iran	Saman Razi
World Ranking List (as of Feb 29, 2016)	8	Ukraine	Anton Kriukov
World Ranking List (as of Feb 29, 2016)	8	Iraq	Thaer Al-Ali
World Ranking List (as of Feb 29, 2016)	8	Malaysia	Jong Yee Khie
Invitational	2		
Total	10		

=== 107 Kg ===
Section	Places	NPC	Qualified lifter
World Ranking List (as of Feb 29, 2016)	8	Azerbaijan	Elshan Huseynov
World Ranking List (as of Feb 29, 2016)	8	Greece	Pavlos Mamalos
World Ranking List (as of Feb 29, 2016)	8	Iran	Ali Sadeghzadeshsalmani
World Ranking List (as of Feb 29, 2016)	8	Egypt	Mohammed Elsayed
World Ranking List (as of Feb 29, 2016)	8	China	Cai Huichao
World Ranking List (as of Feb 29, 2016)	8	Jordan	Haidarah Abdallah Alkawamleh
World Ranking List (as of Feb 29, 2016)	8	Kyrgyzstan	Zhyrgalbek Orosbaev
World Ranking List (as of Feb 29, 2016)	8	Malaysia	Md Saad Mohd Shahmil
Invitational	2		
Total	10		

=== +107 Kg ===
Section	Places	NPC	Qualified lifter
World Ranking List (as of Feb 29, 2016)	8	Iran	Siamand Rahman
World Ranking List (as of Feb 29, 2016)	8	South Korea	Chun Keun-bae
World Ranking List (as of Feb 29, 2016)	8	Russia	Petr Filatov
World Ranking List (as of Feb 29, 2016)	8	Egypt	Amr Mosaad
World Ranking List (as of Feb 29, 2016)	8	Jordan	Jamil Elshebli
World Ranking List (as of Feb 29, 2016)	8	Greece	Konstantinos Dimous
World Ranking List (as of Feb 29, 2016)	8	United Arab Emirates	Ahmed Khamis Albaloushi
World Ranking List (as of Feb 29, 2016)	8	Azerbaijan	Maharram Aliyev
Invitational	2		
Total	10		

== Women's events ==
=== 41 Kg ===
Section	Places	NPC	Qualified lifter
World Ranking List (as of May 30, 2016)	6	Turkey	Nasmiye Muratli
World Ranking List (as of May 30, 2016)	6	China	Cui Zhe
World Ranking List (as of May 30, 2016)	6	Nigeria	Jonah Ben
World Ranking List (as of May 30, 2016)	6	Indonesia	Ni Nengah Widiasih
World Ranking List (as of May 30, 2016)	6	Egypt	Nawal Ramadan
World Ranking List (as of May 30, 2016)	6	Ukraine	Maryna Kopiika
Invitational	2		
Total	8		

=== 45 Kg ===
Section	Places	NPC	Qualified lifter
World Ranking List (as of May 30, 2016)	6	China	Hu Dandan
World Ranking List (as of May 30, 2016)	6	Nigeria	Latifat Tijani
World Ranking List (as of May 30, 2016)	6	Egypt	Zeinab Oteify
World Ranking List (as of May 30, 2016)	6	Poland	Justyna Kozdryk
World Ranking List (as of May 30, 2016)	6	Ukraine	Rayisa Toporkova
World Ranking List (as of May 30, 2016)	6	Great Britain	Zoe Newson
Invitational	2		
Total	8		

=== 50 Kg ===
Section	Places	NPC	Qualified lifter
World Ranking List (as of May 30, 2016)	6	Ukraine	Lidiia Soloviova
World Ranking List (as of May 30, 2016)	6	China	Shi Shanshan
World Ranking List (as of May 30, 2016)	6	Egypt	Rehab Ahmed
World Ranking List (as of May 30, 2016)	6	Spain	Loida Zabala Ollero
World Ranking List (as of May 30, 2016)	6	Vietnam	Dang Thi Linh Phuong
World Ranking List (as of May 30, 2016)	6	Mexico	Rosaura Rodríguez
Invitational	2		
Total	8		

=== 55 Kg ===
Section	Places	NPC	Qualified lifter
World Ranking List (as of May 30, 2016)	6	Nigeria	Esther Oyema
World Ranking List (as of May 30, 2016)	6	China	Xiao Cuijuan
World Ranking List (as of May 30, 2016)	6	Mexico	Amalia Pérez
World Ranking List (as of May 30, 2016)	6	Russia	Tamara Podpalnaya
World Ranking List (as of May 30, 2016)	6	Ukraine	Mariana Shevchuk
World Ranking List (as of May 30, 2016)	6	Great Britain	Natalie Blake
Invitational	2		
Total	8		

=== 61 Kg ===
Section	Places	NPC	Qualified lifter
World Ranking List (as of May 30, 2016)	6	Nigeria	Lucy Ejike
World Ranking List (as of May 30, 2016)	6	China	Yang Yan
World Ranking List (as of May 30, 2016)	6	Russia	Irina Kazantseva
World Ranking List (as of May 30, 2016)	6	Ukraine	Tetyana Shyrokolava
World Ranking List (as of May 30, 2016)	6	Poland	Malgorzata Halas
World Ranking List (as of May 30, 2016)	6	South Africa	Chantell Stierman
Invitational	2		
Total	8		

=== 67 Kg ===
Section	Places	NPC	Qualified lifter
World Ranking List (as of May 30, 2016)	6	China	Tan Yujiao
World Ranking List (as of May 30, 2016)	6	Egypt	Amal Mahmoud
World Ranking List (as of May 30, 2016)	6	Russia	Kheda Berieva
World Ranking List (as of May 30, 2016)	6	Kazakhstan	Raushan Koishibayeva
World Ranking List (as of May 30, 2016)	6	South Korea	Kim Hyeong Hui
World Ranking List (as of May 30, 2016)	6	Turkey	Dilfiroz Kuzdagi
Invitational	2		
Total	8		

=== 73 Kg ===
Section	Places	NPC	Qualified lifter
World Ranking List (as of May 30, 2016)	6	France	Souhad Ghazouani
World Ranking List (as of May 30, 2016)	6	Nigeria	Ndidi Nwosu
World Ranking List (as of May 30, 2016)	6	Egypt	Amany Ali
World Ranking List (as of May 30, 2016)	6	Turkmenistan	Mayagozel Ekeyeva
World Ranking List (as of May 30, 2016)	6	Ukraine	Alina Kumeyko
World Ranking List (as of May 30, 2016)	6	Russia	Nadezhna Sycheva
Invitational	2		
Total	8		

=== 79 Kg ===
Section	Places	NPC	Qualified lifter
World Ranking List (as of May 30, 2016)	6	Nigeria	Bose Omolayo
World Ranking List (as of May 30, 2016)	6	China	Xu Lili
World Ranking List (as of May 30, 2016)	6	Chinese Taipei	Lin Tzu-hui
World Ranking List (as of May 30, 2016)	6	Russia	Vera Muratova
World Ranking List (as of May 30, 2016)	6	Mexico	Perla Barcenas
World Ranking List (as of May 30, 2016)	6	Egypt	Geehan Hassan
Invitational	2		
Total	8		

=== 86 Kg ===
Section	Places	NPC	Qualified lifter
World Ranking List (as of May 30, 2016)	6	Nigeria	Loveline Obiji
World Ranking List (as of May 30, 2016)	6	Egypt	Randa Mahmoud
World Ranking List (as of May 30, 2016)	6	China	Li Fengmei
World Ranking List (as of May 30, 2016)	6	Mexico	Catalina Díaz
World Ranking List (as of May 30, 2016)	6	Jordan	Tharwh Tayseer Hamdan Alhajaj
World Ranking List (as of May 30, 2016)	6	Russia	Olga Kazankevich
Invitational	2		
Total	8		

=== +86 Kg ===
Section	Places	NPC	Qualified lifter
World Ranking List (as of May 30, 2016)	6	Nigeria	Precious Orji
World Ranking List (as of May 30, 2016)	6	Egypt	Nadia Ali
World Ranking List (as of May 30, 2016)	6	Poland	Marzena Zięba
World Ranking List (as of May 30, 2016)	6	Netherlands	Melaica Tuinfort
World Ranking List (as of May 30, 2016)	6	South Korea	Lee Hyung Jung
World Ranking List (as of May 30, 2016)	6	Russia	Svetlana Khairtdinova
Invitational	2		
Total	8		
