= 2014 IPC Powerlifting World Championships =

Parasports competition in Dubai

6th IPC Powerlifting World Championships
- Host city: Dubai, United Arab Emirates
- Nations: 60
- Athletes: 330+
- Events: 20
- Dates: 5–11 April
- Main venue: Dubai Club for the Disabled

The 2014 IPC Powerlifting World Championships was a competition for male and female athletes with a disability. With 360 competitors from over 60 countries, the event surpassed the number of entrants of the 2012 Summer Paralympics of London. It was held in Dubai in the United Arab Emirates and ran from 5 to 11 April. The event was held in the Dubai Club for the Disabled.

The 2014 edition became the final event branded as the "IPC Powerlifting World Championships". On 30 November 2016, the International Paralympic Committee, which serves as the international federation for 10 disability sports, including powerlifting, adopted the "World Para" brand for all 10 sports. The world championship events in all of these sports were immediately rebranded as "World Para" championships. Accordingly, future IPC powerlifting championships will be known as "World Para Powerlifting Championships".

== Competition ==
The 2014 IPC Powerlifting World Championships was the sixth championship in its series, and the second hosted by Dubai. Held at the Dubai Club for the Disabled, the competition was attended by more than 330 athletes representing 60 countries, surpassing the number of entrants for the 2012 Summer Paralympics held in London. Twenty lifting events were contested, with ten categories for both female and male competitors. Medals were given for first, second and third place.

Five countries dominated the results: Nigeria, Egypt, China, Iran and Russia. These five countries took home 41 of the total 60 medals, including 14 golds. Although Egypt led the medal table from day three, Nigeria finished atop the table with five golds after Precious Orji won the final women's event, the over 86 kg category. Egypt won the most medals at the competition, with a total of 12, followed by Russia with 9.

Over the 20 events, 15 world records were equaled or surpassed. Some events saw world records broken multiple times, including both heaviest categories. Precious Orji broke her own world record three times to eventually lift 151 kg, while in the men's event Siamand Rahman of Iran broke his own world record three times lifting 285.5 kg. In the lower weights Egypt's Sherif Othman, in the -54 kg category, surpassed the old world record of 181 kg four times, finishing with a lift of 205 kg.

== Medal table ==
Rank	Nation	Gold	Silver	Bronze	Total
1	Nigeria (NGR)	5	1	1	7
2	Egypt (EGY)	4	6	2	12
3	China (CHN)	3	2	2	7
4	Iran (IRN)	1	5	0	6
5	Russia (RUS)	1	2	6	9
6	Ukraine (UKR)	1	1	0	2
7	Chinese Taipei (TPE)	1	0	0	1
7	Great Britain (GBR)	1	0	0	1
7	Greece (GRE)	1	0	0	1
7	Jordan (JOR)	1	0	0	1
7	Turkey (TUR)	1	0	0	1
12	Mexico (MEX)	0	1	2	3
13	Poland (POL)	0	1	1	2
14	Vietnam (VIE)	0	1	0	1
15	Iraq (IRQ)	0	0	2	2
16	Azerbaijan (AZE)	0	0	1	1
16	Brazil (BRA)	0	0	1	1
16	Indonesia (INA)	0	0	1	1
16	Netherlands (NED)	0	0	1	1
Totals (19 entries)		20	20	20	60

== Schedule ==
●	Opening ceremony	Events	●	Closing ceremony

Date April →		5	6	7	8	9	10	11
Up to 41 kg	Women	Final						
Up to 45 kg	Women		Final					
Up to 49 kg	Men	Final						
Up to 50 kg	Women			Final				
Up to 54 kg	Men		Final					
Up to 55 kg	Women				Final			
Up to 59 kg	Men		Final					
Up to 61 kg	Women				Final			
Up to 65 kg	Men			Final				
Up to 67 kg	Women				Final			
Up to 72 kg	Men			Final				
Up to 73 kg	Women					Final		
Up to 79 kg	Women					Final		
Up to 80 kg	Men				Final			
Up to 86 kg	Women						Final	
Over 86 kg	Women							Final
Up to 88 kg	Men					Final		
Up to 97 kg	Men						Final	
Up to 107 kg	Men							Final
Over 107 kg	Men							Final

== Medalists ==
=== Men ===
Class	Gold	Silver	Bronze
Up to 49 kg	Yakubu Adesokan; Nigeria	Lê Văn Công; Vietnam	Vladimir Balynetc; Russia
Up to 54 kg	Sherif Othman; Egypt	Vladimir Krivulya; Russia	Feng Qi; China
Up to 59 kg	Ali Jawad; United Kingdom	Hamzeh Mohammadi; Iran	Anthony Ulonnam; Nigeria
Up to 65 kg	Liu Lei; China	Ayrat Zakiev; Russia	Shaaban Ibrahim; Egypt
Up to 72 kg	Mohamed Elelfat; Egypt	Rouhollah Rostami; Iran	Sergei Sychev; Russia
Up to 80 kg	Gu Xiaofei; China	Metwaly Mathana; Egypt	Wawrzyniec Latus; Poland
Up to 88 kg	Mutaz Zakaria Aljuneidi; Jordan	Hamed Solhipour; Iran	Jose de Jesus Castillo; Mexico
Up to 97 kg	Abdulazeez Ibrahim; Nigeria	Mohamed Eldib; Egypt	Thaer Al-Ali; Iraq
Up to 107 kg	Pavlos Mamalos; Greece	Ali Sadeghzadeh; Iran	Elshan Huseynov; Azerbaijan
Over 107 kg	Siamand Rahman; Iran	Mansour Pourmirzaei; Iran	Faris Al-Ajeeli; Iraq

=== Women ===
Class	Gold	Silver	Bronze
Up to 41 kg	Nazmiye Muslu; Turkey	Cui Zhe; China	Ni Nengah Widiasih; Indonesia
Up to 45 kg	Rayisa Toporkova; Ukraine	Justyna Kozdryk; Poland	Laura Cerero; Mexico
Up to 50 kg	Olesya Lafina; Russia	Lidiia Soloviova; Ukraine	Gihan Abdelaziz; Egypt
Up to 55 kg	Esther Oyema; Nigeria	Shi Shanshan; China	Anastasia Khonina; Russia
Up to 61 kg	Fatma Omar; Egypt	Amalia Perez; Mexico	Yang Yan; China
Up to 67 kg	Tan Yujiao; China	Amal Mahmoud; Egypt	Kheda Berieva; Russia
Up to 73 kg	Ijeoma Iherobiem; Nigeria	Amany Ali; Egypt	Vera Muratova; Russia
Up to 79 kg	Lin Tzu-hui; Chinese Taipei	Geehan Hussan; Egypt	Márcia Cristina Menezes; Brazil
Up to 86 kg	Randa Mahmoud; Egypt	Loveline Obiji; Nigeria	Olga Kiseleva; Russia
Over 86 kg	Josephine Orji; Nigeria	Nadia Ali; Egypt	Melaica Tuinfort; Netherlands

== Team Rankings ==
- Men : 1- IRI 67 2- EGY 65 3- CHN 61
- Women : 1- EGY 68 2- CHN 62 3- RUS 58
