= Powerlifting at the 2020 Summer Paralympics =

Powerlifting at the XVI Paralympic Games
- Powerlifting pictogram of the 2020 Summer Paralympics
- Venue: Tokyo International Forum
- Dates: 26 to 30 August 2021
- Competitors: 179 from 55 nations

Powerlifting at the 2020 Summer Paralympics in Tokyo, Japan, was held at the Tokyo International Forum.

The 2020 Summer Olympic and Paralympic Games were postponed to 2021 due to the COVID-19 pandemic. They kept the 2020 name and were held from 24 August to 5 September 2021.

== Qualified nations ==
- Algeria (3)
- Azerbaijan (4)
- Brazil (7)
- Cameroon (1)
- Chile (4)
- China (14)
- Chinese Taipei (1)
- Colombia (4)
- Cuba (2)
- Cyprus (1)
- Dominican Republic (1)
- Egypt (15)
- El Salvador (1)
- France (2)
- Georgia (2)
- Ghana (1)
- Great Britain (5)
- Greece (4)
- Hungary (1)
- India (2)
- Indonesia (1)
- Iran (5)
- Iraq (6)
- Ireland (1)
- Israel (1)
- Italy (1)
- Ivory Coast (1)
- Japan (4)
- Jordan (7)
- Kazakhstan (5)
- Kenya (1)
- Malaysia (2)
- Mexico (4)
- Moldova (2)
- Mongolia (1)
- Morocco (3)
- Nigeria (10)
- Panama (1)
- Peru (1)
- Poland (6)
- RPC (2)
- Serbia (1)
- Singapore (1)
- South Korea (5)
- Spain (2)
- Syria (2)
- Thailand (3)
- Turkey (5)
- Ukraine (8)
- United Arab Emirates (2)
- United States (1)
- Uzbekistan (3)
- Venezuela (3)
- Vietnam (2)

== Medals ==
Rank	NPC	Gold	Silver	Bronze	Total
1	China	7	6	0	13
2	Nigeria	3	1	2	6
3	Jordan	3	0	0	3
4	Iran	1	3	1	5
5	Malaysia	1	1	0	2
5	Ukraine	1	1	0	2
7	Brazil	1	0	0	1
7	Kazakhstan	1	0	0	1
7	Mexico	1	0	0	1
7	Mongolia	1	0	0	1
11	Egypt	0	4	2	6
12	France	0	1	1	2
13	Indonesia	0	1	0	1
13	Uzbekistan	0	1	0	1
13	Vietnam	0	1	0	1
16	Great Britain	0	0	3	3
17	Poland	0	0	2	2
18	Algeria	0	0	1	1
18	Azerbaijan	0	0	1	1
18	Colombia	0	0	1	1
18	El Salvador	0	0	1	1
18	Greece	0	0	1	1
18	Iraq	0	0	1	1
18	RPC	0	0	1	1
18	Turkey	0	0	1	1
18	Venezuela	0	0	1	1
Totals (26 entries)		20	20	20	60

== Medalists ==
=== Men's events ===
Event	Gold	Silver	Bronze
49 kg	Omar Qarada; Jordan	Lê Văn Công; Vietnam	Parvin Mammadov; Azerbaijan
54 kg	David Degtyarev; Kazakhstan	Axel Bourlon; France	Dimitrios Bakochristos; Greece
59 kg	Qi Yongkai; China	Sherif Othman; Egypt	Herbert Aceituno; El Salvador
65 kg	Liu Lei; China	Amir Jafari; Iran	Hocine Bettir; Algeria
72 kg	Bonnie Bunyau Gustin; Malaysia	Mahmoud Attia; Egypt	Micky Yule; Great Britain
80 kg	Rouhollah Rostami; Iran	Gu Xiaofei; China	Mohamed Elelfat; Egypt
88 kg	Abdelkareem Khattab; Jordan	Ye Jixiong; China	Hany Abdelhady; Egypt
97 kg	Yan Panpan; China	Hamed Solhipour; Iran	Fabio Torres; Colombia
107 kg	Enkhbayaryn Sodnompiljee; Mongolia	Jong Yee Khie; Malaysia	Saman Razi; Iran
+107 kg	Jamil Elshebli; Jordan	Mansour Pourmirzaei; Iran	Faris Al-Ageeli; Iraq

=== Women's events ===
Event	Gold	Silver	Bronze
41 kg	Guo Lingling; China	Ni Nengah Widiasih; Indonesia	Clara Fuentes Monasterio; Venezuela
45 kg	Latifat Tijani; Nigeria	Cui Zhe; China	Justyna Kozdryk; Poland
50 kg	Hu Dandan; China	Rehab Ahmed; Egypt	Olivia Broome; Great Britain
55 kg	Mariana Shevchuk; Ukraine	Xiao Cuijuan; China	Besra Duman; Turkey
61 kg	Amalia Pérez; Mexico	Ruza Kuzieva; Uzbekistan	Lucy Ejike; Nigeria
67 kg	Tan Yujiao; China	Fatma Omar; Egypt	Olaitan Ibrahim; Nigeria
73 kg	Mariana D'Andrea; Brazil	Xu Lili; China	Souhad Ghazouani; France
79 kg	Bose Omolayo; Nigeria	Nataliia Oliinyk; Ukraine	Vera Muratova; RPC
86 kg	Folashade Oluwafemiayo; Nigeria	Zheng Feifei; China	Louise Sugden; Great Britain
+86 kg	Deng Xuemei; China	Loveline Obiji; Nigeria	Marzena Zięba; Poland

== See also ==
- Weightlifting at the 2020 Summer Olympics
