= Powerlifting at the 2016 Summer Paralympics – Men's 72 kg =

Powerlifting – Men's 72 kg at the XV Paralympic Games
- Venue: Riocentro
- Date: 11 September 2016
- Competitors: 10 from 10 nations
- Winning lift: 221.0 kg WR

Medalists
1st place, gold medalist(s)		Liu Lei	China
2nd place, silver medalist(s)		Rasool Mohsin	Iraq
3rd place, bronze medalist(s)		Nnamdi Innocent	Nigeria

The men's 72 kg powerlifting event at the 2016 Summer Paralympics was contested on 11 September at Riocentro.

== Records ==
There are twenty powerlifting events, corresponding to ten weight classes each for men and women. The weight categories were significantly adjusted after the 2012 Games so most of the weights are new for 2016. As a result, no Paralympic record was available for this weight class prior to the competition. The existing world records were as follows.

Record Type	Weight	Country	Venue	Date
World record	182 kg	Liu Lei (CHN)	Kuala Lumpur	26 February 2016
Paralympic record	–	–	–	–

== Results ==
Rank	Name	Body weight (kg)	Attempts (kg)				Result (kg)
Rank	Name	Body weight (kg)	1	2	3	4	Result (kg)
1st place, gold medalist(s)	Liu Lei (CHN)	69.67	216.0	221.0	~~229.00~~	~~227.5~~	221.0
2nd place, silver medalist(s)	Rasool Mohsin (IRQ)	71.19	~~215.0~~	220.0	~~229.0~~	227.0 WR PR	220.0
3rd place, bronze medalist(s)	Nnamdi Innocent (NGR)	70.78	203.0	210.0	~~215.0~~	–	210.0
4	Marek Trykacz (POL)	66.48	168.0	173.0	~~181.0~~	–	173.0
5	Fernando Acevedo (NCA)	70.88	~~140.0~~	~~140.0~~	140.0	–	140.0
-	Gabriel Zelaya Diaz (HON)	71.06	~~100.0~~	~~105.0~~	~~105.0~~	–	NMR
-	Herbert Aceituno (ESA)	68.87	~~185.0~~	~~185.0~~	~~185.0~~	–	NMR
-	Sergey Meladze (TKM)	71.21	~~100.0~~	~~100.0~~	~~100.0~~	–	NMR
-	Abdelkareem Khattab (JOR)	71.38	~~210.0~~	~~210.0~~	~~215.0~~	–	NMR
-	Mohamed Elelfat (EGY)	71.69	~~213.0~~	~~213.0~~	~~213.0~~	–	NMR
