= Powerlifting at the 2020 Summer Paralympics – Women's +86 kg =

Powerlifting – Women's +86 kg at the XVI Paralympic Games
- Venue: Tokyo International Forum
- Date: 30 August 2021
- Competitors: 8 from 8 nations

Medalists
1st place, gold medalist(s)		Deng Xuemei	China
2nd place, silver medalist(s)		Loveline Obiji	Nigeria
3rd place, bronze medalist(s)		Marzena Zięba	Poland

The women's +86 kg powerlifting event at the 2020 Summer Paralympics was contested on 30 August at Tokyo International Forum.

== Records ==
There are twenty powerlifting events, corresponding to ten weight classes each for men and women. Prior to this competition, the existing world and Paralympic records were as follows.

World Record	Josephine Orji (NGR)	160 kg	Rio de Janeiro, Brazil	14 September 2016
Paralympic Record	Josephine Orji (NGR)	160 kg	Rio de Janeiro, Brazil	14 September 2016

== Results ==
Rank	Name	Body weight (kg)	Attempts (kg)				Result (kg)
Rank	Name	Body weight (kg)	1	2	3	4	Result (kg)
1st place, gold medalist(s)	Deng Xuemei (CHN)	109.44	147	151	153	–	153
2nd place, silver medalist(s)	Loveline Obiji (NGR)	104.03	142	147	~~152~~	–	147
3rd place, bronze medalist(s)	Marzena Zięba (POL)	113.92	137	140	~~142~~	–	140
4	Perla Patricia Bárcenas (MEX)	100.80	~~130~~	135	~~140~~	–	135
5	Randa Mahmoud (EGY)	86.40	124	128	~~140~~	–	128
6	Lee Hyun-jung (KOR)	115.20	115	121	126	–	126
7	Polina Katsman (ISR)	105.28	123	~~127~~	~~127~~	–	123
8	Huda Ali (IRQ)	103.25	85	~~90~~	90	–	90
