= Powerlifting at the 2016 Summer Paralympics – Women's +86 kg =

Powerlifting – Women's +86 kg at the XV Paralympic Games
- Venue: Riocentro
- Date: 14 September 2016
- Competitors: 7 from 7 nations
- Winning lift: 154.0 kg

Medalists
1st place, gold medalist(s)		Josephine Orji	Nigeria
2nd place, silver medalist(s)		Marzena Zięba	Poland
3rd place, bronze medalist(s)		Melaica Tuinfort	Netherlands

The women's +86 kg powerlifting event at the 2016 Summer Paralympics was contested on 14 September at Riocentro.

== Records ==
There are twenty powerlifting events, corresponding to ten weight classes each for men and women. The weight categories were significantly adjusted after the 2012 Games so most of the weights are new for 2016. As a result, no Paralympic record was available for this weight class prior to the competition. The existing world records were as follows.

Record Type	Weight	Name	Date	Location
World record	153 kg	Josephine Orji (NGR)	30 July 2005	Almaty, Kazakhstan
Paralympic record	132 kg	Standard		

== Results ==
Rank	Name	Body weight (kg)	Attempts (kg)				Result (kg)
Rank	Name	Body weight (kg)	1	2	3	4	Result (kg)
1st place, gold medalist(s)	Josephine Orji (NGR)	151.0	~~154.0~~	154.0	~~160.0~~	160.0 WR PR	154.0
2nd place, silver medalist(s)	Marzena Zięba (POL)	115.27	128.0	130.0	134.0	–	134.0
3rd place, bronze medalist(s)	Melaica Tuinfort (NED)	125.0	125.0	130.0	~~134.0~~	–	130.0
4	Lee Hyun-jong (KOR)	99.55	115.0	~~120.0~~	~~130.0~~	–	115.0
–	Ghazalah Alaqouri (LBA)	99.86	~~75.0~~	~~75.0~~	~~75.0~~	–	NMR
–	Adeline Ancheta (PHI)	112.01	~~112.0~~	~~116.0~~	~~121.0~~	–	NMR
–	Nadia Ali (EGY)	107.98	~~145.0~~	~~145.0~~	~~145.0~~	–	NMR
