= Xu Yanmei =

Xu Yanmei may refer to:

- Xu Yanmei (diver) (born 1971), Chinese diver
- Xu Yanmei (powerlifter), Chinese Paralympic powerlifter
