= Tuinfort =

Tuinfort is a surname. Notable people with the surname include:

- Giorgio Tuinfort (born 1981), Surinamese-Dutch record producer
- Melaica Tuinfort (born 1990), Dutch powerlifter
