= Powerlifting at the 2016 Summer Paralympics =

Powerlifting at the XV Paralympic Games
- Venue: Riocentro
- Dates: 8–14 September 2016
- Competitors: 180 (100 male, 80 female)

Powerlifting at the 2016 Summer Paralympics was held at Riocentro from September, with a maximum of 180 athletes (100 men and 80 women), competing in 20 events. According to the classification rules of the International Federation for Powerlifting athletes which cannot participate in weightlifting events because of a physical impairment affecting their legs or hips are deemed eligible to compete in powerlifting events at the Paralympics.

== Events ==
There are twenty powerlifting events, corresponding to ten weight classes each for men and women. The weight categories were significantly adjusted after the 2012 Games so most of the weights are new for 2016.

Powerlifting at the 2016 Summer Paralympics - Weight Divisions
Men		Women	
49 kg	80 kg	41 kg	67 kg
54 kg	88 kg	45 kg	73 kg
59 kg	97 kg	50 kg	79 kg
65 kg	107 kg	55 kg	86 kg
72 kg	+107 kg	61 kg	+86 kg

== Qualification ==
There were 120 male and 80 female competitors. The bulk of the quota places will be decided by reference to the IPC Powerlifting Rankings on 29 February 2016. Subject to a quota limit of one place per National Paralympic Committee, the top 8 ranked male, and top 6 ranked female athletes in each weight division will gain a quota place for their NPC. If they are the only lifter from their NPC in that list, that lifter shall gain the place; if an NPC has two or more lifters in quota place ranking position, the choice of lifter will be for the NPC from that number.

Two further quota places per event will be awarded by the Bipartite Commission.

The following is a summary of the qualification places at the 2016 Summer Paralympic Powerlifting event.

NPC	Men										Women										Total
NPC	49 Kg	54 Kg	59 Kg	65 Kg	72 Kg	80 Kg	88 Kg	97 Kg	107 Kg	+107 Kg	41 Kg	45 Kg	50 Kg	55 Kg	61 Kg	67 Kg	73 Kg	79 Kg	86 Kg	+86 Kg	Total
Algeria				X																	1
Azerbaijan				X					X	X											3
Brazil		X					X														2
Chile			X																		1
China		X	X	X	X	X	X	X	X		X	X	X	X	X	X		X	X		16
Chinese Taipei															X			X			2
Colombia						X															1
Ivory Coast		X																			1
Egypt			X	X	X	X	X	X	X	X	X	X	X			X	X	X	X	X	16
France	X																X				2
Great Britain			X	X								X		X							4
Greece		X	X	X					X	X											5
Hungary	X																				1
India	X																				1
Indonesia											X										1
Iran				X			X	X	X	X											5
Iraq					X			X													2
Jordan	X				X		X		X	X									X		6
Kazakhstan																X					1
Kyrgyzstan		X							X												2
Malaysia								X	X												2
Mexico						X		X					X	X				X	X		6
Mongolia							X														1
Netherlands																				X	1
Nigeria	X	X	X		X	X	X	X			X	X		X	X		X	X	X	X	15
Poland			X	X	X	X						X			X					X	7
Russia	X		X		X					X				X	X	X	X	X	X	X	11
South Africa															X						1
South Korea	X									X						X				X	4
Spain													X								1
Turkey						X					X					X					3
Turkmenistan					X												X				2
Ukraine		X						X			X	X	X	X	X		X				8
United Arab Emirates							X			X											2
Uzbekistan						X															1
Vietnam	X	X											X								3
Total NPCs	8	8	8	8	8	8	8	8	8	8	6	6	6	6	7	6	6	6	6	6	141

== Schedule ==
OC	Opening ceremony	●	Event finals	CC	Closing ceremony

September 2016	7 Wed	8 Thu	9 Fri	10 Sat	11 Sun	12 Mon	13 Tue	14 Wed	15 Thu	16 Fri	17 Sat	18 Sun	Gold medals
Powerlifting	OC	• •	• • •	• • •	• • •	• • •	• • •	• • •				CC	20

Schedule at the Paralympic Games 2016 - Powerlifting*
Date	Medal events	Date	Medal events
8 September	Men's 49 kg Women's 41 kg	12 September	Men's 80 kg Women's 73 kg Women's 79 kg
9 September	Men's 54 kg Men's 59 kg Women's 45 kg	13 September	Men's 88 kg Men's 97 kg Women's 86 kg
10 September	Men's 65 kg Women's 50 kg Women's 55 kg	14 September	Men's 107 kg Men's +107 kg Women's +86 kg
11 September	Men's 72 kg Women's 61 kg Women's 67 kg		

== Medal summary ==
=== Medal table ===
Rank	Nation	Gold	Silver	Bronze	Total
1	Nigeria (NGR)	6	2	1	9
2	China (CHN)	3	6	3	12
3	Egypt (EGY)	3	4	3	10
4	Iran (IRI)	2	0	1	3
5	Mexico (MEX)	1	0	2	3
6	Greece (GRE)	1	0	1	2
6	Vietnam (VIE)	1	0	1	2
8	Turkey (TUR)	1	0	0	1
8	Ukraine (UKR)	1	0	0	1
8	United Arab Emirates (UAE)	1	0	0	1
11	Jordan (JOR)	0	2	1	3
12	Great Britain (GBR)	0	1	1	2
13	Brazil (BRA)	0	1	0	1
13	France (FRA)	0	1	0	1
13	Iraq (IRQ)	0	1	0	1
13	Kazakhstan (KAZ)	0	1	0	1
13	Poland (POL)	0	1	0	1
18	Chinese Taipei (TPE)	0	0	1	1
18	Hungary (HUN)	0	0	1	1
18	Indonesia (INA)	0	0	1	1
18	Mongolia (MGL)	0	0	1	1
18	Netherlands (NED)	0	0	1	1
18	Uzbekistan (UZB)	0	0	1	1
Totals (23 entries)		20	20	20	60

=== Men's events ===
Games	Gold	Silver	Bronze
49 kg	Lê Văn Công; Vietnam	Omar Qarada; Jordan	Nándor Tunkel; Hungary
54 kg	Roland Ezuruike; Nigeria	Wang Jian; China	Dimitrios Bakochristos; Greece
59 kg	Sherif Othman; Egypt	Ali Jawad; Great Britain	Yang Quanxi; China
65 kg	Paul Kehinde; Nigeria	Hu Peng; China	Shaaban Ibrahim; Egypt
72 kg	Liu Lei; China	Rasool Mohsin; Iraq	Nnamdi Innocent; Nigeria
80 kg	Majid Farzin; Iran	Gu Xiaofei; China	Akhror Bozorov; Uzbekistan
88 kg	Mohammed Khamis Khalaf; United Arab Emirates	Evânio da Silva; Brazil	Sodnompiljee Enkhbayar; Mongolia
97 kg	Mohamed Eldib; Egypt	Qi Dong; China	Jose de Jesus Castillo Castillo; Mexico
107 kg	Pavlos Mamalos; Greece	Mohamed Ahmed; Egypt	Ali Sadeghzadeh; Iran
+107 kg	Siamand Rahman; Iran	Amr Mosaad; Egypt	Jamil Elshebli; Jordan

=== Women's events ===
Games	Gold	Silver	Bronze
41 kg	Nazmiye Muratlı; Turkey	Cui Zhe; China	Ni Nengah Widiasih; Indonesia
45 kg	Hu Dandan; China	Latifat Tijani; Nigeria	Zoe Newson; Great Britain
50 kg	Lidiia Soloviova; Ukraine	Rehab Ahmed; Egypt	Đặng Thị Linh Phượng; Vietnam
55 kg	Amalia Pérez; Mexico	Esther Oyema; Nigeria	Xiao Cuijuan; China
61 kg	Lucy Ejike; Nigeria	Fatma Omar; Egypt	Yang Yan; China
67 kg	Tan Yujiao; China	Raushan Koishibayeva; Kazakhstan	Amal Mahmoud; Egypt
73 kg	Ndidi Nwosu; Nigeria	Souhad Ghazouani; France	Amany Ali; Egypt
79 kg	Bose Omolayo; Nigeria	Xu Lili; China	Lin Tzu-hui; Chinese Taipei
86 kg	Randa Mahmoud; Egypt	Tharwat Alhajjaj; Jordan	Catalina Diaz Vilchis; Mexico
+86 kg	Josephine Orji; Nigeria	Marzena Zięba; Poland	Melaica Tuinfort; Netherlands
