= Powerlifting at the 2012 Summer Paralympics – Women's 82.5 kg =

Powerlifting – Women's 82.5 kg at the XIV Paralympic Games
- Venue: ExCeL London
- Date: 4 September 2012
- Competitors: 8 from 8 nations
- Winning lift: 145.0 kg

Medalists
1st place, gold medalist(s)		Loveline Obiji	Nigeria
2nd place, silver medalist(s)		Randa Mahmoud	Egypt
3rd place, bronze medalist(s)		Xu Yanmei	China

The women's 82.5 kg powerlifting event at the 2012 Summer Paralympics was contested on 4 September at ExCeL London.

== Records ==
Prior to the competition, the existing world and Paralympic records were as follows.

World record	155.0 kg	Heba Ahmed (EGY)	Beijing, China	14 September 2008
Paralympic record	155.0 kg	Heba Ahmed (EGY)	Beijing, China	14 September 2008

== Results ==
Rank	Name	Body weight (kg)	Attempts (kg)				Result (kg)
Rank	Name	Body weight (kg)	1	2	3	4	Result (kg)
1st place, gold medalist(s)	Loveline Obiji (NGR)	81.03	145.0	~~149.0~~	~~149.0~~	–	145.0
2nd place, silver medalist(s)	Randa Mahmoud (EGY)	80.95	135.0	140.0	~~145.0~~	–	140.0
3rd place, bronze medalist(s)	Xu Yanmei (CHN)	75.33	120.0	125.0	129.0	–	129.0
4	Catalina Diaz Vilchis (MEX)	78.28	115.0	~~122.0~~	128.0	–	128.0
5	Tatiana Smirnova (RUS)	80.70	108.0	112.0	~~116.0~~	–	112.0
6	Marcia Cristina Menezes (BRA)	80.73	110.0	~~115.0~~	~~116.0~~	–	110.0
7	Huda Ali (IRQ)	81.72	~~108.0~~	108.0	~~113.0~~	–	108.0
8	Sharifah Raudzah Syed Akil (MAS)	81.30	~~95.0~~	~~97.0~~	97.0	–	97.0

Key: PR=Paralympic record; WR=World record; NMR=No marks recorded
