= Mansour Pourmirzaei =

Iranian Paralympic powerlifter

Personal information
- Nationality: Iranian
- Born: 21 September 1980 (age 45) Rafsanjan
- Weight: 154 kg (340 lb)

Sport
- Sport: Paralympic powerlifting, Bench Press
Medal record
Representing Iran
Paralympic Games
Silver medal – second place	2020 Tokyo	+107 kg
IPC World Championships
Silver medal – second place	2014 Dubai	+107kg
Silver medal – second place	2017 Mexico City	+107kg
Silver medal – second place	2019 Nur-Sultan	+107kg
Asian Para Games
Silver medal – second place	2014 Incheon	+107 kg
Silver medal – second place	2018 Jakarta	+107 kg

Mansour Pourmirzaei (Persian: منصور پورمیرزایی, born September 21, 1980) is an Iranian Paralympic powerlifter who won a silver medal at the 2020 Tokyo Paralympics.

== Major results ==
Year	Venue	Weight	Attempts (kg)				Result (kg)	Rank
Year	Venue	Weight	1	2	3	4	Result (kg)	Rank
Paralympic Games
2020	Tokyo, Japan	+107 kg	235	241	~~246~~	--	241	2nd place, silver medalist(s)
World Championships
2014	Dubai, United Arab Emirates	+107 kg	255	265	~~275~~	--	265	2nd place, silver medalist(s)
2017	Mexico City, Mexico	+107 kg	236	241	~~260~~	--	241	2nd place, silver medalist(s)
2019	Nur-Sultan, Kazakhstan	+107 kg	~~236~~	236	~~251~~	--	236	2nd place, silver medalist(s)

World Championships

2 +107 kg 2019 Nur-Sultan, KAZ 236.0

2 +107 kg 2017 Mexico City, MEX 241.0

2 +107 kg 2014 Dubai, UAE 265.0

Asian Para Games

2 +107 kg 2018 Jakarta, INA 248
