= Xu Lili (powerlifter) =

Chinese Paralympic powerlifter

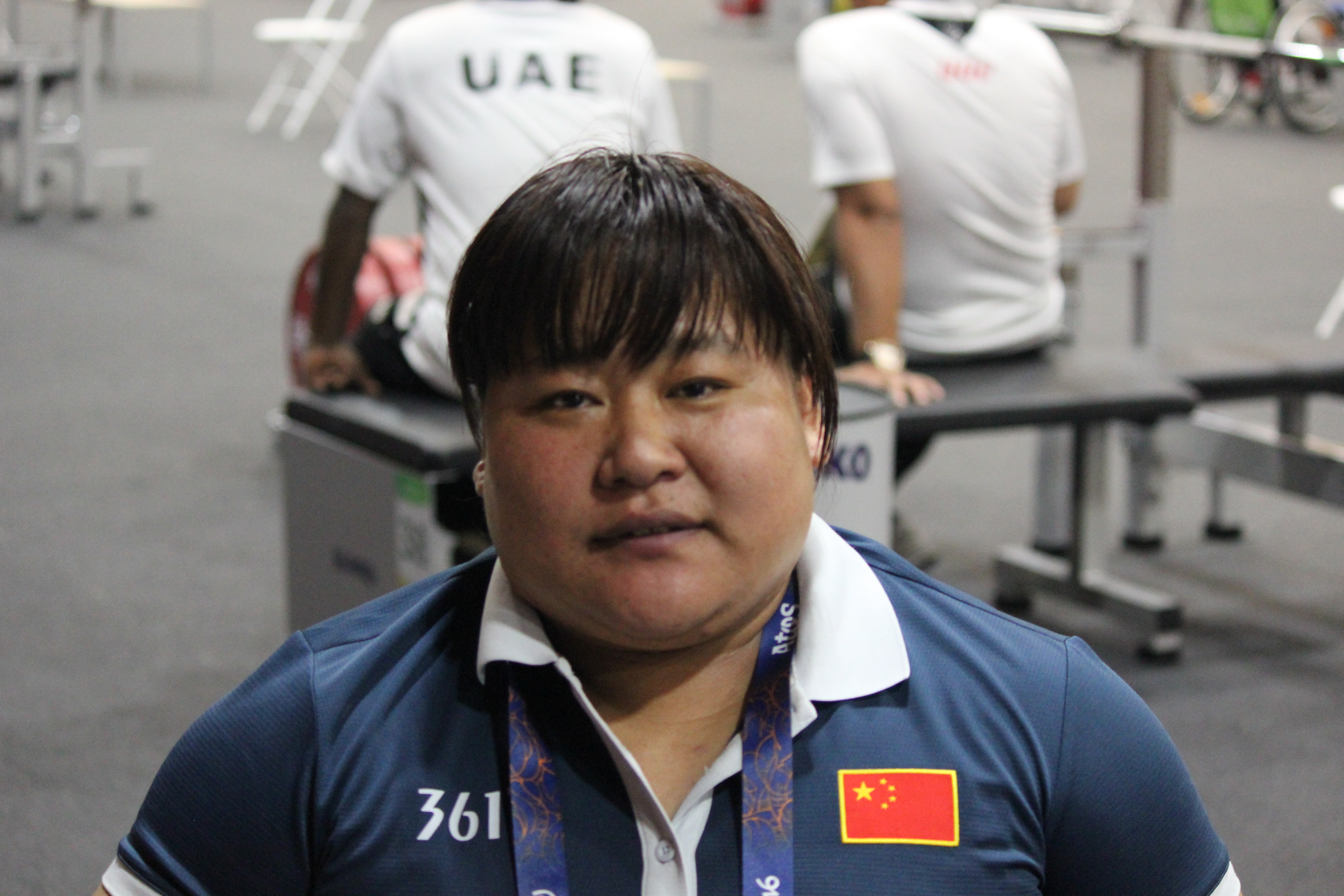
- Xu at the 2016 Summer Paralympics

Personal information
- Born: 1 February 1981 (age 45) Chifeng, China

Sport
- Country: China
- Sport: Powerlifting
Medal record
Paralympic Games
Silver medal – second place	2016 Rio de Janeiro	79 kg
Silver medal – second place	2020 Tokyo	73 kg
World Championships
Gold medal – first place	2017 Mexico City	79 kg
Gold medal – first place	2021 Tbilisi	73 kg
Silver medal – second place	2019 Nur-Sultan	79 kg
Asian Para Games
Gold medal – first place	2018 Jakarta	79kg
Gold medal – first place	2022 Hangzhou	73 kg

Xu Lili (born 1 February 1981) is a Chinese para powerlifter. She is a two-time silver medalist at the Summer Paralympics and has been world champion in the women's up-to-73kg competition.

== Career ==
She was born in Chifeng in 1981. Like her fellow athlete Song Lingling, she acquired a leg disability due to polio. While working at a factory in 2009, she was discovered and encouraged to pursue a career in para powerlifting. Li Weipu became her coach, and she made her international debut the following year at the World Championships in Kuala Lumpur, reaching the final in the under 75kg category. Xu also competed at the 2015 IPC Powerlifting Asian Open Championships, where she won silver, and at the 2016 Summer Paralympics in Rio de Janeiro.

She won the silver medal in the women's 73 kg event at the 2020 Summer Paralympics held in Tokyo, Japan, finishing behind Mariana D'Andrea of Brazil. She broke her record by lifting 138 kg. A few months later, she won the gold medal in the same category at the 2021 World Para Powerlifting Championships held in Tbilisi, Georgia. With this result, she reclaimed the title of world champion in the women's up-to-73kg category.
