= Powerlifting at the 2020 Summer Paralympics – Men's 72 kg =

Powerlifting – Men's 72 kg at the XVI Paralympic Games
- Venue: Tokyo International Forum
- Date: 28 August 2021
- Competitors: 10 from 10 nations

Medalists
| 1st place, gold medalist(s) | | Bonnie Bunyau Gustin | Malaysia |
| 2nd place, silver medalist(s) | | Mahmoud Attia | Egypt |
| 3rd place, bronze medalist(s) | | Micky Yule | Great Britain |

The men's 72 kg powerlifting event at the 2020 Summer Paralympics was contested on 28 August at Tokyo International Forum.

== Records ==
There are twenty powerlifting events, corresponding to ten weight classes each for men and women. Prior to this competition, the existing world and Paralympic records were as follows.

| World Record | Bonnie Bunyau Gustin (MAS) | 230.0 kg | Dubai, United Arab Emirates | 22 June 2021 |
| Paralympic Record | Rasool Mohsin (IRQ) | 227.0 kg | Riocentro, Brazil | 11 September 2016 |

== Results ==
| Rank | Name | Body weight (kg) | Attempts (kg) | | | | Result (kg) |
| Rank | Name | Body weight (kg) | 1 | 2 | 3 | 4 | Result (kg) |
|---|---|---|---|---|---|---|---|
| 1st place, gold medalist(s) | Bonnie Bunyau Gustin (MAS) | 69.45 | 217 | 225 | 228 PR | ~~231~~ | 228 |
| 2nd place, silver medalist(s) | Mahmoud Attia (EGY) | 69.08 | 185 | ~~191~~ | 191 | – | 191 |
| 3rd place, bronze medalist(s) | Micky Yule (GBR) | 71.58 | 180 | ~~182~~ | 182 | – | 182 |
| 4 | Thongsa Marasri (THA) | 71.53 | 180 | ~~190~~ | ~~190~~ | – | 180 |
| 5 | Rey Melchor Dimas Vasquez (PAN) | 71.12 | 165 | 169 | ~~180~~ | – | 169 |
| 6 | Hajime Ujiro (JPN) | 71.31 | 156 | ~~162~~ | 162 | – | 162 |
| 7 | Emmanuel Nii Tettey Oku (GHA) | 70.54 | 160 | ~~168~~ | ~~169~~ | – | 160 |
| | Nnamdi Innocent (NGR) | 71.40 | ~~200~~ | ~~200~~ | ~~200~~ | – | NM |
| | Rasool Mohsin (IRQ) | 71.34 | ~~205~~ | ~~206~~ | ~~206~~ | – | NM |
| | Hu Peng (CHN) | 71.58 | ~~208~~ | ~~208~~ | ~~208~~ | – | NM |
