= Nigeria at the 2016 Summer Paralympics =

- IPC code: NGR
- NPC: Nigeria Paralympic Committee

in Rio de Janeiro
- Competitors: 23 in 3 sports
- Flag bearer: Lucy Ejike
- Medals Ranked 17th: Gold 8 Silver 2 Bronze 2 Total 12

Summer Paralympics appearances (overview)
- 1992; 1996; 2000; 2004; 2008; 2012; 2016; 2020; 2024

Nigeria competed at the 2016 Summer Paralympics in Rio de Janeiro, Brazil, from 7 September to 18 September 2016. Nigeria's delegation of 23 sportspeople was mostly composed of powerlifters, with the country sending 14 lifters to Rio. Ahead of the Rio Games, the National Sports Commission promised Paralympic medals to erase the country's Olympic shame.

Nigeria had issues with qualifying a bigger team for Rio because of a lack of funding available to its elite sportspeople. This was particularly true for table tennis, one of the three sports Nigeria competed in at Rio. The other two sports were athletics and powerlifting.

== Background ==
Going into the Rio Games, Nigerian officials promised that the delegation would return home from Rio with medals. Prior to the Games the former director of the National Sports Commission was quoted as saying that he had hopes that the performance of the country's Paralympians would, "erase the shame of the dismal showing at the Olympic Games."

Sportspeople in Nigeria had difficulties in qualifying for Rio owing to a lack of funds. Most of the funding for Nigerian Paralympic participation came from the Nigerian government, with little funding coming from the private sector.

In many parts of Black Africa, people who have disabilities that include insanity, and physical disabilities such as impairments and deformities often face cultural barriers to participation because of attitudes related to their disabilities. These include beliefs that they acquired their disabilities because their parents were witches or they are wizards. Their disability is often seen as a result of a personal failing on their part. As such, there is often tremendous cultural pressure for people with physical disabilities to remain hidden and out of the public eye. In many places, they are perceived to be monsters in need of healing. This is the context to which Nigerian Paralympians engage both society and sport internally, in their own country.

Following the success of the Nigerian team at the Paralympics in recent cycles, there were some changes in attitudes towards people with disabilities in the country. An idealized body in a Nigerian context sometimes became a superperson in their cyborg body, overcoming problems with corruption, lack of funding and other barriers to succeed at the highest level in society.

== Team ==
Nigeria's delegation of 23 sportspeople was mostly composed of powerlifters, with the country sending 14 lifters to Rio. Lauritta Onye is a Nollywood actress who performs using the name Laury White. She appeared in the 2015 movie, "Lords of Money."

== Disability classifications ==
Every participant at the Paralympics has their disability grouped into one of five disability categories; amputation, the condition may be congenital or sustained through injury or illness; cerebral palsy; wheelchair athletes, there is often overlap between this and other categories; visual impairment, including blindness; Les autres, any physical disability that does not fall strictly under one of the other categories, for example dwarfism or multiple sclerosis. Each Paralympic sport then has its own classifications, dependent upon the specific physical demands of competition. Events are given a code, made of numbers and letters, describing the type of event and classification of the athletes competing. Some sports, such as athletics, divide athletes by both the category and severity of their disabilities, other sports, for example swimming, group competitors from different categories together, the only separation being based on the severity of the disability.

== Medalists ==
Nigeria's medal haul was more than the total earned by Nigeria's 2016 Olympic team who came away with one bronze medal, earned in men's football. They finished seventeenth overall on the medal table. Their performance was the best medal wise among African nations at the 2016 Games. It was also Nigeria's best gold medal performance at a Paralympic Games since 1992, when the country made its debut.

The following Nigerian competitors won medals at the Games. In the 'by discipline' sections below, medallists' names are in bold.

Medal	Name	Sport	Event	Date
Gold	Roland Ezuruike	Powerlifting	Men's 54 kg	9 September
Gold	Paul Kehinde	Powerlifting	Men's –65 kg	10 September
Gold	Lauritta Onye	Athletics	Women's shot put F40	11 September
Gold	Lucy Ejike	Powerlifting	Women's 61 kg	11 September
Gold	Ndidi Nwosu	Powerlifting	Women's –73 kg	12 September
Gold	Bose Omolayo	Powerlifting	Women's -79 kg	12 September
Gold	Flora Ugwunwa	Athletics	Women's javelin throw F54	13 September
Gold	Josephine Orji	Powerlifting	Women's +86 kg	15 September
Silver	Latifat Tijani	Powerlifting	Women's –45 kg	9 September
Silver	Esther Oyema	Powerlifting	Women's –55 kg	10 September
Bronze	Nnamdi Innocent	Powerlifting	Men's –72 kg	11 September
Bronze	Eucharia Iyiazi	Athletics	Women's discus throw F57	15 September

== Athletics ==
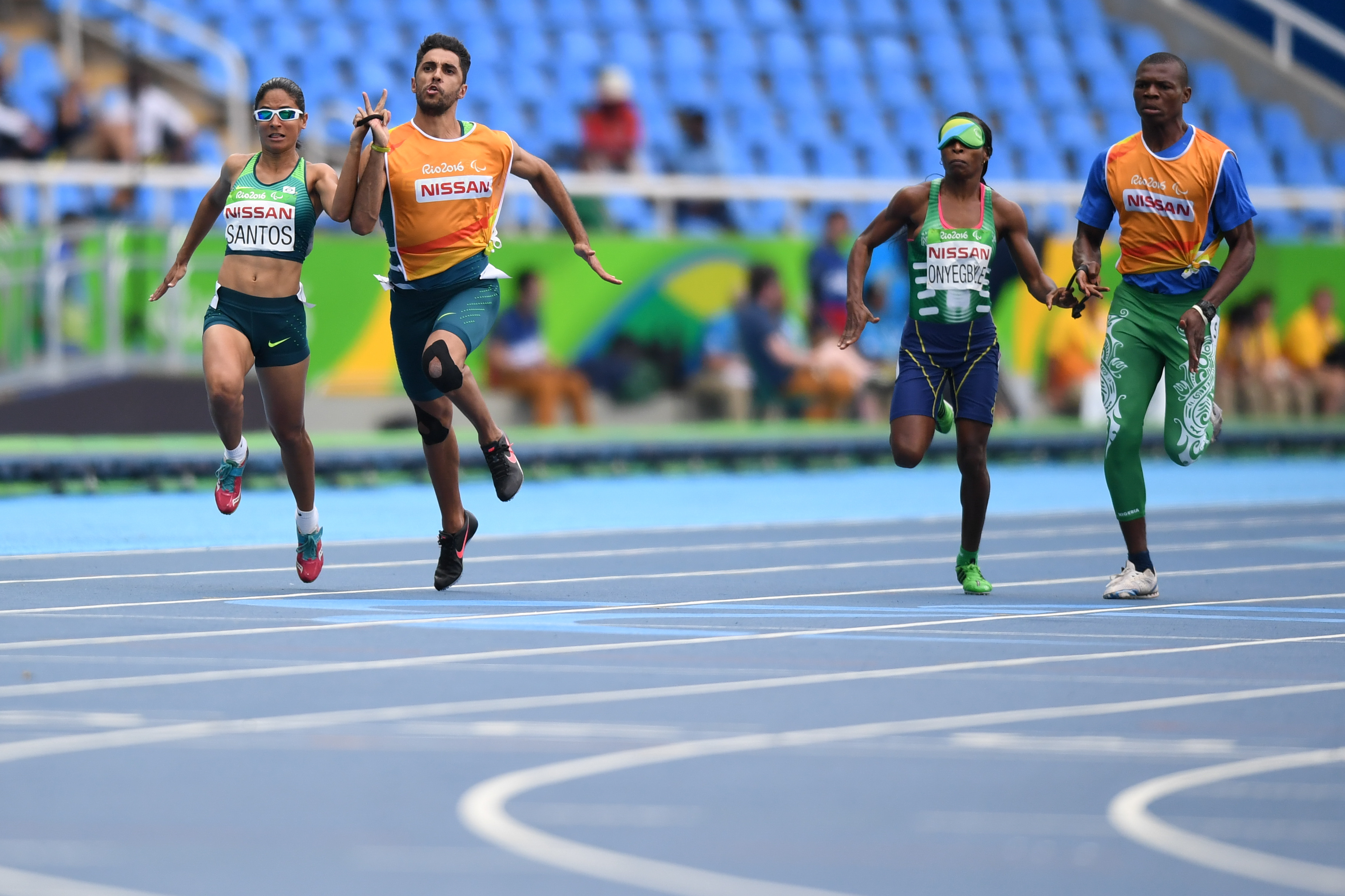
Lovina Onyegbule competing in the women's 100 metres T11 event.

Nigeria had athletes competing in athletics in Rio. Lauritta Onye set a world record in the women's F40 shot put with a throw of 8.40m. Her performance earned her a gold medal.

Women

Track

Athlete	Events	Heat		Semifinal		Final	
Athlete	Events	Time	Rank	Time	Rank	Time	Rank
Lovina Onyegbule	100 m T11	12.70	4	—N/a		Did not advance	

== Powerlifting ==
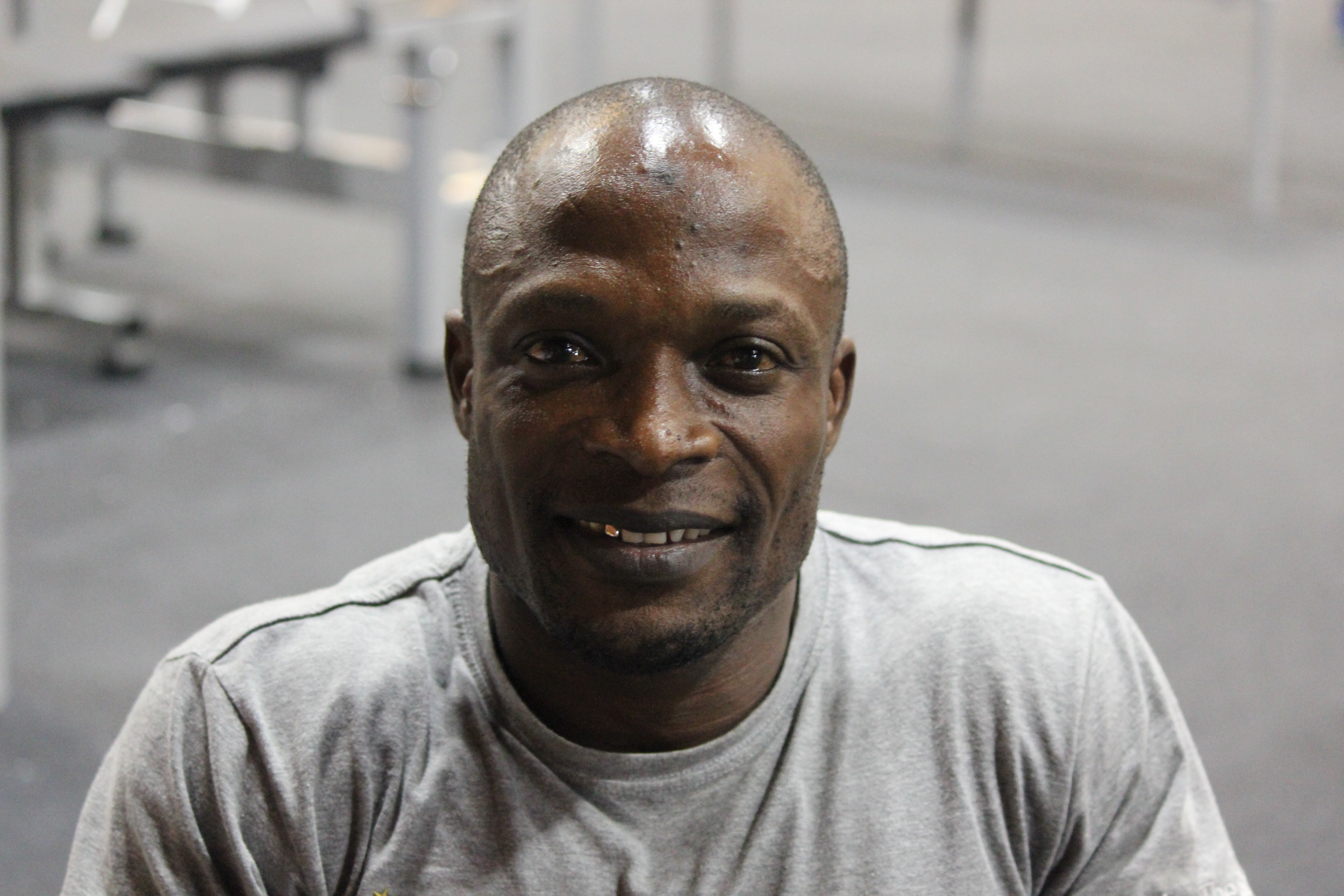
Roland Ezuruike, gold medal winning powerlifter in Rio for the 2016 Games.

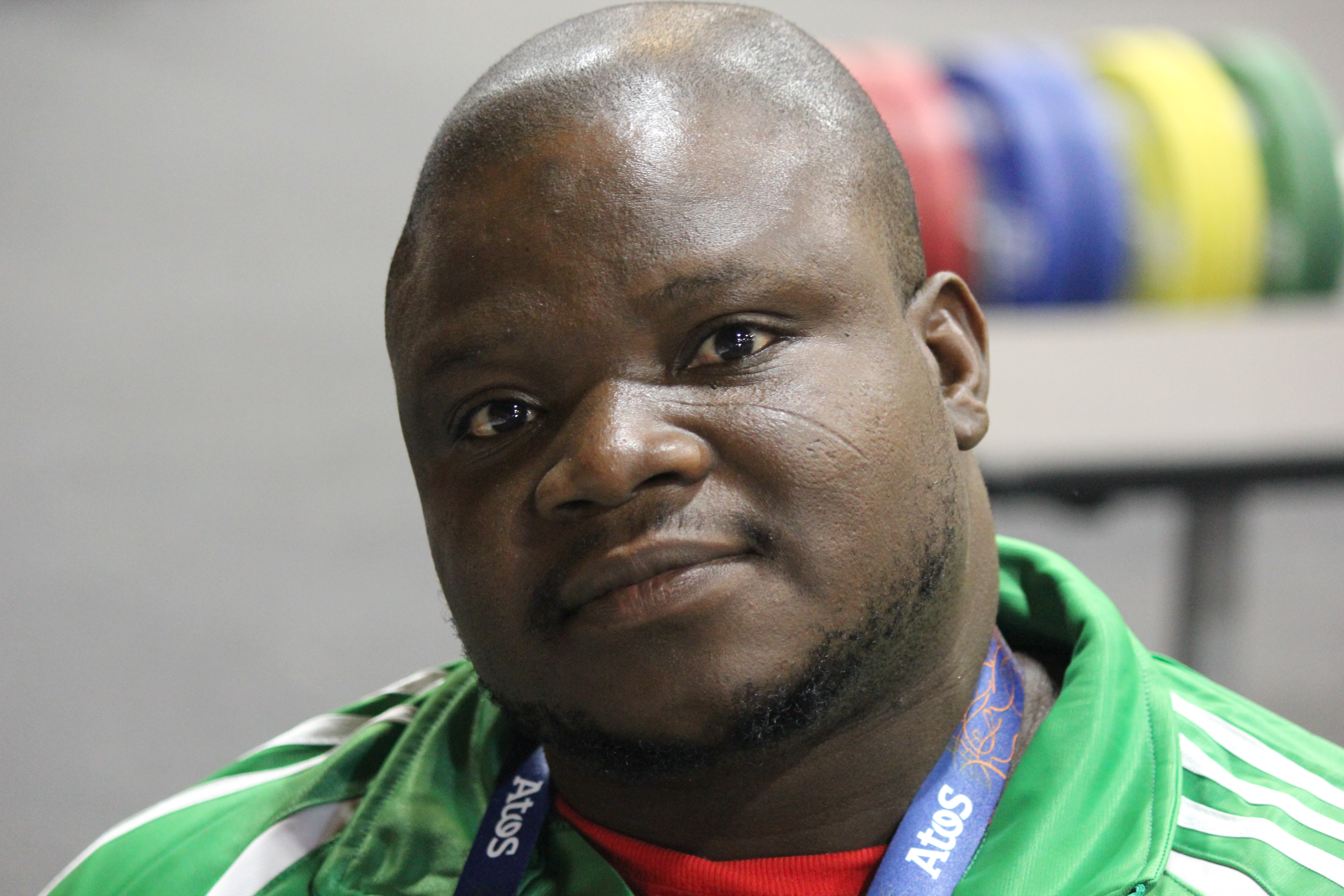
Abdulazeez Ibrahim in Rio for the Paralympic Games.

Nigeria had 14 athletes competing in powerlifting in Rio. Lucy Ejike competed in the women's under 61 kg event, winning gold with a world record lift of 142 kg.

Athlete	Event	Total lifted	Rank
Men
Yakubu Adesokan	Men's –49 kg	DNS	-
Roland Ezuruike	Men's –54 kg	200 kg	1st place, gold medalist(s)
Paul Kehinde	Men's –65 kg	220 kg	1st place, gold medalist(s)
Nnamdi Innocent	Men's –72 kg	210 kg	3rd place, bronze medalist(s)
Tolu-Lope Taiwo	Men's –80 kg	200 kg	5
Opeyemi Jegede	Men's –88 kg	200 kg	5
Abdulazeez Ibrahim	Men's –97 kg	215 kg	6
Women
Nsini Ben	Women's –41 kg	NMR	-
Latifat Tijani	Women's –45 kg	106 kg	2nd place, silver medalist(s)
Esther Oyema	Women's –55 kg	127 kg	2nd place, silver medalist(s)
Lucy Ejike	Women's –61 kg	142 kg	1st place, gold medalist(s)
Ndidi Nwosu	Women's –73 kg	140 kg	1st place, gold medalist(s)
Bose Omolayo	Women's –79 kg	138 kg	1st place, gold medalist(s)
Josephine Orji	Women's +86 kg	154 kg	1st place, gold medalist(s)

== Table tennis ==
Nigerian table tennis players had difficulty qualifying for Rio as a result of the lack of funding to enable them to participate in qualifying events. Some table tennis players contacted Director-General of the National Sports Commission Mallam Alhassan Yakmut seeking the release of funds to enable them to attend a qualifying event in Morocco in October 2015. Nasiru Bello, Faith Obiorah and Philomena Konwe all had their qualifying impacted by funding issues related to attending the event.

Nigerian table tennis was still going to be represented in Rio despite the other issues: Cecilia Arinye was selected as an umpire for the Paralympic Games in table tennis.

Men

Athlete	Event	Group Matches			Round 1	Quarterfinals	Semifinals	Final / BM	
Athlete	Event	Opposition Result	Opposition Result	Rank	Opposition Result	Opposition Result	Opposition Result	Opposition Result	Rank
Emmanuel Chinedu Nick	Singles class 4	Thomas (FRA); L 0–3	Kim (KOR); L 0-3	3	Did not advance				

Women

Athlete	Event	Group Matches			Round 1	Quarterfinals	Semifinals	Final / BM	
Athlete	Event	Opposition Result	Opposition Result	Rank	Opposition Result	Opposition Result	Opposition Result	Opposition Result	Rank
Faith Obiora	Singles class 5	Gu (CHN); L 0–3	Wei (TPE); W 3–2	2 Q	—N/a	Zhang (CHN); L 3–0	Did not advance		

== See also ==
- Nigeria at the 2016 Summer Olympics
