= Sherif Othman =

Egyptian Paralympic powerlifter

Sherif Osman
Personal information
- Nationality: Egyptian
- Born: 15 September 1982 (age 43) Beni Mazar, Egypt

Sport
- Club: Police Sports Association: Egypt

Achievements and titles
- Paralympic finals: 2008; 2012; 2016; 2020
- Highest world ranking: 1st
- Personal best: 211kg (-59kg) WR
Medal record
Representing Egypt
Powerlifting
Paralympic Games
Gold medal – first place	2008 Beijing	−56 kg
Gold medal – first place	2012 London	−56 kg
Gold medal – first place	2016 Rio de Janeiro	−59 kg
Silver medal – second place	2020 Tokyo	−59 kg
World Championships
Gold medal – first place	2010 Kuala Lumpur	−56 kg
Gold medal – first place	2014 Dubai	−54 kg
Gold medal – first place	2019 Nur-Sultan	Mixed team
Gold medal – first place	2021 Tbilisi	−59 kg
Silver medal – second place	2006 South Korea	−56 kg

Sherif Othman, more commonly written internationally as Sherif Osman, (born 15 September 1982) is an Egyptian Paralympic powerlifter competing in the -56 kg class. Othman has participated in four Summer Paralympic Games winning three gold medals and one silver medal. In the 2008 Summer Paralympics in Beijing he broke the world record with a lift of 202.5 kg. He surpassed his own record when he record a weight of 205 kg at the 2010 IPC Powerlifting World Championship. Then he surpassed his own record again of 205 kg when he record a weight of 211 kg at 2016 Summer Paralympics Games (Rio 2016) winning another gold medal.

In 2021, he won the gold medal in his event at the 2021 World Para Powerlifting Championships held in Tbilisi, Georgia.
