= Xu Yanmei (powerlifter) =

Chinese Paralympic powerlifter

Personal information
- Born: Shangrao, China

Sport
- Country: China
- Sport: Paralympic powerlifting
Medal record
Paralympic Games
Bronze medal – third place	2012 London	82.5 kg

Xu Yanmei is a Chinese Paralympic powerlifter. She represented China at the 2012 Summer Paralympics held in London, United Kingdom and she won the bronze medal in the women's 82.5 kg event.
