= Amany Ali =

Egyptian Paralympic powerlifter

Sport
- Country: Egypt
- Sport: Paralympic powerlifting
Medal record
Paralympic Games
Bronze medal – third place	2016 Rio de Janeiro	73 kg
World Championships
Silver medal – second place	2014 Dubai	73 kg

Amany Ali is an Egyptian Paralympic powerlifter. She represented Egypt at the 2012 Summer Paralympics and at the 2016 Summer Paralympics and she won the bronze medal in the women's 73 kg event in 2016.

At the 2014 World Championships she won the silver medal in the women's 73 kg event. She also competed at the 2019 World Championships where she finished in 5th place in the women's 86 kg event.

At the 2015 African Games she won the bronze medal in the women's 67 & 73 kg event.

At the 2018 World Para Powerlifting African Championships she won the silver medal in the women's 86 kg event.
