= Melaica Tuinfort =

Dutch Paralympic powerlifter

Personal information
- Born: 11 March 1990 (age 36)

Sport
- Country: Netherlands
- Sport: Paralympic powerlifting
Medal record
Summer Paralympics
Bronze medal – third place	2016 Rio de Janeiro	+86 kg
World Championships
Bronze medal – third place	2014 Dubai	+86 kg

Melaica Tuinfort (born 11 March 1990) is a Dutch Paralympic powerlifter. She won the bronze medal in the women's +86 kg event at the 2016 Summer Paralympics held in Rio de Janeiro, Brazil.

At the 2014 IPC Powerlifting World Championships held in Dubai, United Arab Emirates she won the bronze medal in the women's +86 kg event.
