= Saman Razi =

Iranian Paralympic powerlifter

Personal information
- National team: Islamic Republic of Iran
- Born: 24 March 1986 (age 40)

Sport
- Sport: Paralympic powerlifting
Medal record
Men's Paralympic powerlifting
Representing Iran
Paralympic Games
Bronze medal – third place	2020 Tokyo	107 kg
World Championships
Bronze medal – third place	2021 Tbilisi	107 kg
Asian Para Games
Silver medal – second place	2014 Incheon	97 kg
Bronze medal – third place	2018 Jakarta	107 kg
Bronze medal – third place	2022 Hangzhou	107 kg

Samam Razi (born 24 March 1986) is an Iranian powerlifter.

== Career ==
He won the bronze medal in the men's 107 kg event at the 2020 Summer Paralympics held in Tokyo, Japan. A few months later, he also won the bronze medal in his event at the 2021 World Para Powerlifting Championships held in Tbilisi, Georgia.

He won silver with 222 kg at the Powerlifting World Cup in Dubai in February 2016. He also ranked 4th in the men's 97 kg event at the 2016 Summer Paralympics held in Rio de Janeiro, Brazil.
