= Nnamdi Innocent =

Nigerian Paralympic powerlifter

Personal information
- Born: 30 September 1980 (age 45) Nigeria

Sport
- Country: Nigeria
- Sport: Paralympic powerlifting
Medal record
Paralympic Games
Bronze medal – third place	2016 Rio de Janeiro	72 kg
World Championships
Bronze medal – third place	2019 Nur-Sultan	72 kg
Commonwealth Games
Bronze medal – third place	2022 Birmingham	Lightweight

Nnamdi Innocent (born 30 September 1980) is a Nigerian Paralympic powerlifter. He represented Nigeria at the 2016 Summer Paralympics in Rio de Janeiro, Brazil and he won the bronze medal in the men's 72 kg event. In 2021, he did not perform a successful lift in the men's 72 kg event at the 2020 Summer Paralympics in Tokyo, Japan.

He won the gold medal in the men's 72 kg event at the 2018 African Para Powerlifting Championships held in Algiers, Algeria. At the 2019 World Para Powerlifting Championships held in Nur-Sultan, Kazakhstan, he won the bronze medal in the men's 72 kg event.

He won the bronze medal in the men's lightweight event at the 2022 Commonwealth Games held in Birmingham, England.

== Results ==
Year	Venue	Weight	Attempts (kg)			Total	Rank
Year	Venue	Weight	1	2	3	Total	Rank
Summer Paralympics
2016	Rio de Janeiro, Brazil	72 kg	203	210	~~215~~	210	3rd place, bronze medalist(s)
2021	Tokyo, Japan	72 kg	~~200~~	~~200~~	~~200~~	–	NM
World Championships
2017	Mexico City, Mexico	72 kg	180	190	~~204~~	190	5
2019	Nur-Sultan, Kazakhstan	72 kg	190	~~200~~	~~202~~	190	3rd place, bronze medalist(s)
