= Powerlifting at the 2020 Summer Paralympics – Women's 73 kg =

Powerlifting – Women's 73 kg at the XVI Paralympic Games
- Venue: Tokyo International Forum
- Date: 29 August 2021
- Competitors: 8 from 8 nations

Medalists
1st place, gold medalist(s)		Mariana D'Andrea	Brazil
2nd place, silver medalist(s)		Xu Lili	China
3rd place, bronze medalist(s)		Souhad Ghazouani	France

The women's 73 kg powerlifting event at the 2020 Summer Paralympics was contested on 29 August at Tokyo International Forum.

== Records ==
There are twenty powerlifting events, corresponding to ten weight classes each for men and women. Prior to this competition, the existing world and Paralympic records were as follows.

World Record	Souhad Ghazouani (FRA)	150 kg	Alexin, Russia	25 May 2013
Paralympic Record	Souhad Ghazouani (FRA)	140 kg	Rio de Janeiro, Brazil	12 September 2016

== Results ==
Rank	Name	Body weight (kg)	Attempts (kg)				Result (kg)
Rank	Name	Body weight (kg)	1	2	3	4	Result (kg)
1st place, gold medalist(s)	Mariana D'Andrea (BRA)	69.70	130	133	137	–	137
2nd place, silver medalist(s)	Xu Lili (CHN)	70.92	~~133~~	134	~~138~~	–	134
3rd place, bronze medalist(s)	Souhad Ghazouani (FRA)	72.17	122	126	132	–	132
4	Amal Mahmoud (EGY)	72.04	~~125~~	127	131	–	131
5	Kheda Berieva (RPC)	72.22	122	127	~~130~~	–	127
6	Paulina Okpala (NGR)	71.35	119	124	~~131~~	–	124
7	Britney Arendse (IRL)	71.10	103	104	107	–	107
8	Larisa Marinenkova (MDA)	71.58	~~82~~	82	~~90~~	–	82
	Sibel Çam (TUR)	71.84	~~129~~	~~129~~	~~131~~	–	NM
