= Yakubu Adesokan =

Nigerian Paralympic powerlifter

Personal information
- Born: 16 July 1979 (age 46)
Medal record
Representing Nigeria
Men's powerlifting
Paralympic Games
Gold medal – first place	2012 London	−48 kg
World Championships
Gold medal – first place	2014 Dubai	−49 kg

Yakubu Adesokan (born 16 July, 1979) is a Nigerian powerlifter. At the 2012 Summer Paralympics, he won a gold medal in the men's 48 kg powerlifting event, lifting 180 kg (397 lb).
