= Catalina Diaz Vilchis =

Mexican Paralympic athlete

Catalina Diaz
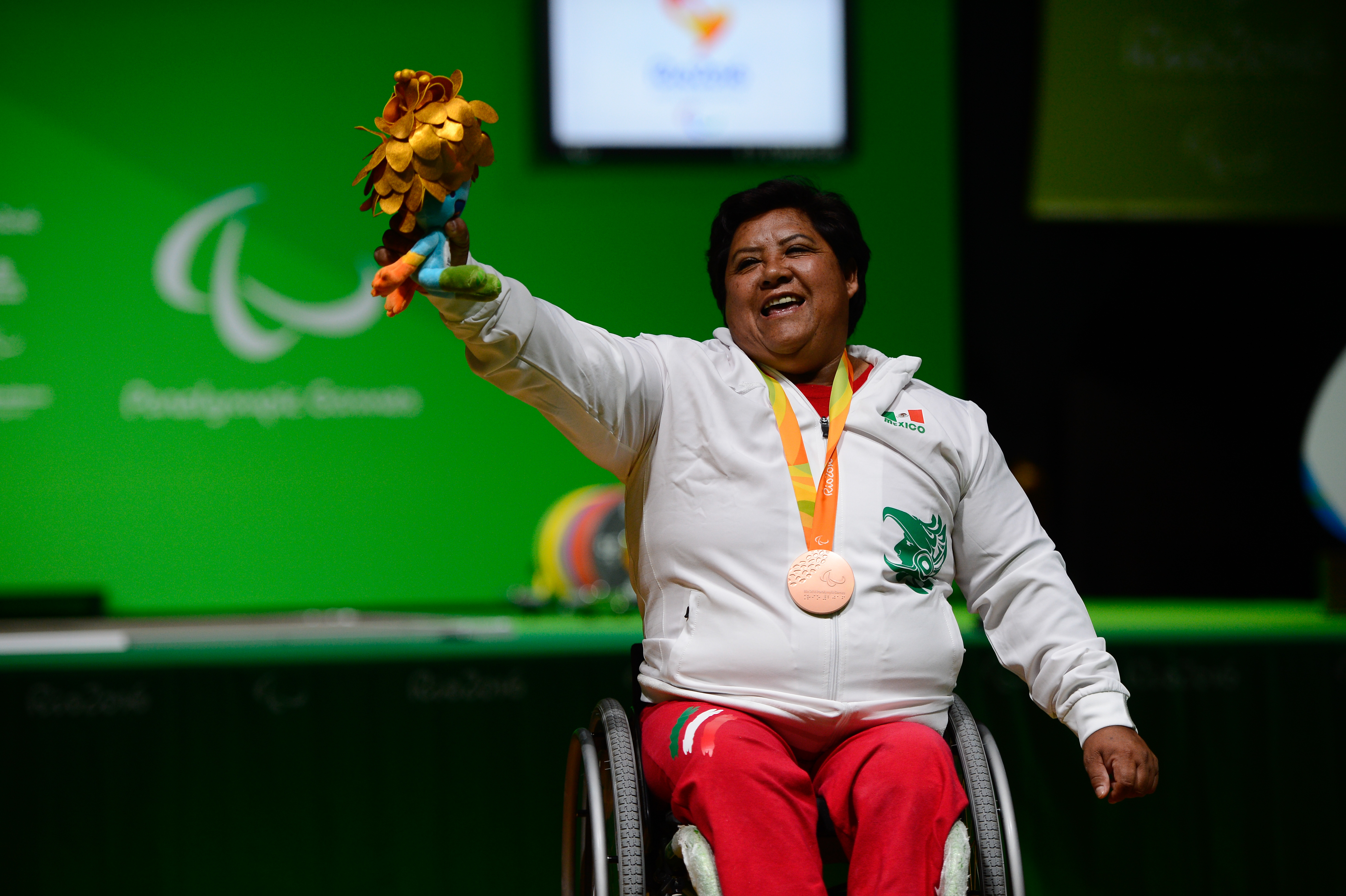
- Catalina Diaz Vilchis in 2016

Personal information
- Full name: Catalina Diaz Vilchis
- Born: 30 April 1964 (age 62) Jiquipilco, Mexico

Sport
- Country: Mexico
- Sport: Paralympic powerlifting
- Disability: Polio
Medal record
Paralympic powerlifting
Representing Mexico
Paralympic Games
Bronze medal – third place	2004 Athens	67.5kg
Bronze medal – third place	2016 Rio de Janeiro	86kg
World Championships
Silver medal – second place	1998 Dubai	60kg
Silver medal – second place	2006 Busan	75kg
Bronze medal – third place	2002 Kuala Lumpur	67.5kg
Parapan American Games
Silver medal – second place	2011 Guadalajara	Middleweight
Silver medal – second place	2015 Toronto	73, 79, 86, +86kg

Catalina Diaz Vilchis (born 30 April 1964), a Mexican weightlifter, specialized in Powerlifting. She won the bronze medal at the 2016 Summer Paralympics held in Rio de Janeiro. She also participated in the 2004 Summer Olympics in Athens.

== Biography ==
Catalina started practicing weightlifting when she was 21 years old within the Sistema Nacional para el Desarrollo Integral de la Familia in Mexico city. her disability was caused by Poliomyelitis. Catalina was inspired by Eduardo Nájera, Michael Jordan and Ana Gabriela Guevara.

== Sport career ==
At the 2016 Summer Paralympics, held in Rio de Janeiro, she managed to lift 117 kg in the 86 kg category, enough to earn the bronze medal by one kilogram. While in Athens 2004, she won the bronze medal; she lift 110 kg in the 67.5 kg category.
