= Marzena Zięba =

Polish Paralympic powerlifter

Personal information
- Born: 27 March 1990 (age 36) Gromnik, Poland

Sport
- Country: Poland
- Sport: Paralympic powerlifting
- Disability: Arthrogryposis
- Weight class: +86 kg
Medal record
Paralympic Games
Silver medal – second place	2016 Rio de Janeiro	+86 kg
Bronze medal – third place	2020 Tokyo	+86 kg

Marzena Zięba (born 27 March 1990) is a Polish Paralympic powerlifter. She represented Poland at the Summer Paralympics in 2008, 2012, 2016 and 2021. She won the silver medal in the women's +86 kg event in 2016 and the bronze medal in this event in 2021.

At the 2019 World Championships held in Nur-Sultan, Kazakhstan, she finished in 5th place in the women's +86 kg event.
