= Randa Mahmoud =

Egyptian Paralympic powerlifter

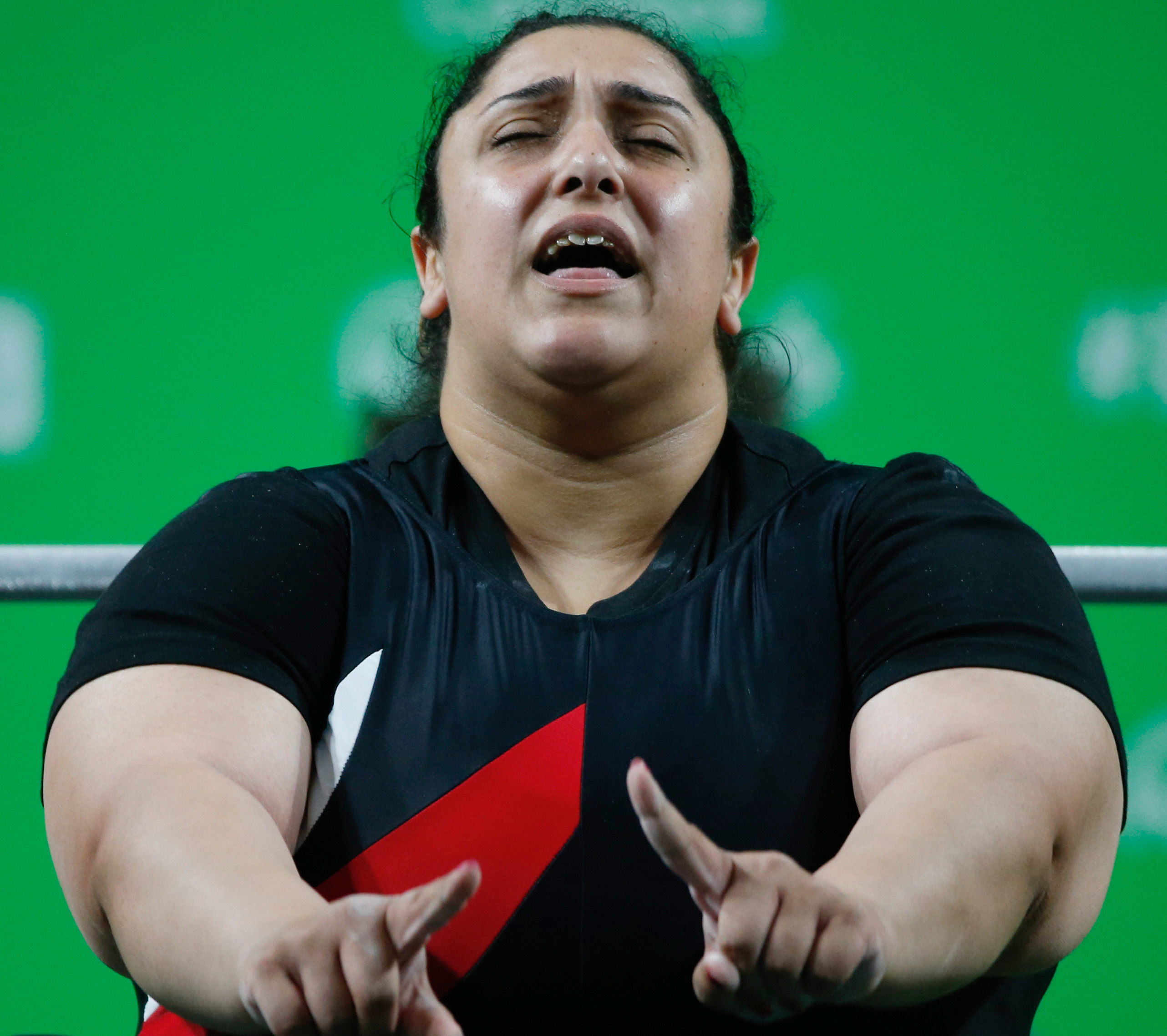
- Mahmoud at the 2016 Paralympics

Personal information
- Nationality: Egyptian
- Born: 20 August 1987 (age 38)

Sport
- Country: Egypt
- Sport: Powerlifting
Medal record
Representing Egypt
Paralympic Games
Silver medal – second place	2008 Beijing	−75 kg
Silver medal – second place	2012 London	−82.5 kg
Gold medal – first place	2016 Rio	−86 kg
IPC World Championships
Gold medal – first place	2014 Dubai	−86 kg

Randa Mahmoud (born 20 August 1987) is an Egyptian Paralympic powerlifter. She won a gold medal in the 86 kg division at the 2016 Paralympics, placing second in 2008 and 2012 in lighter categories.

At the 2014 IPC Powerlifting Championships in Dubai, Randa had to witness Loveline Obiji from Nigeria being awarded the gold medal after her world record setting last lift was not allowed. However Mahmoud appealed and her lift was allowed giving her the gold medal and the world record.
