= Mariana D'Andrea =

Brazilian Paralympic powerlifter

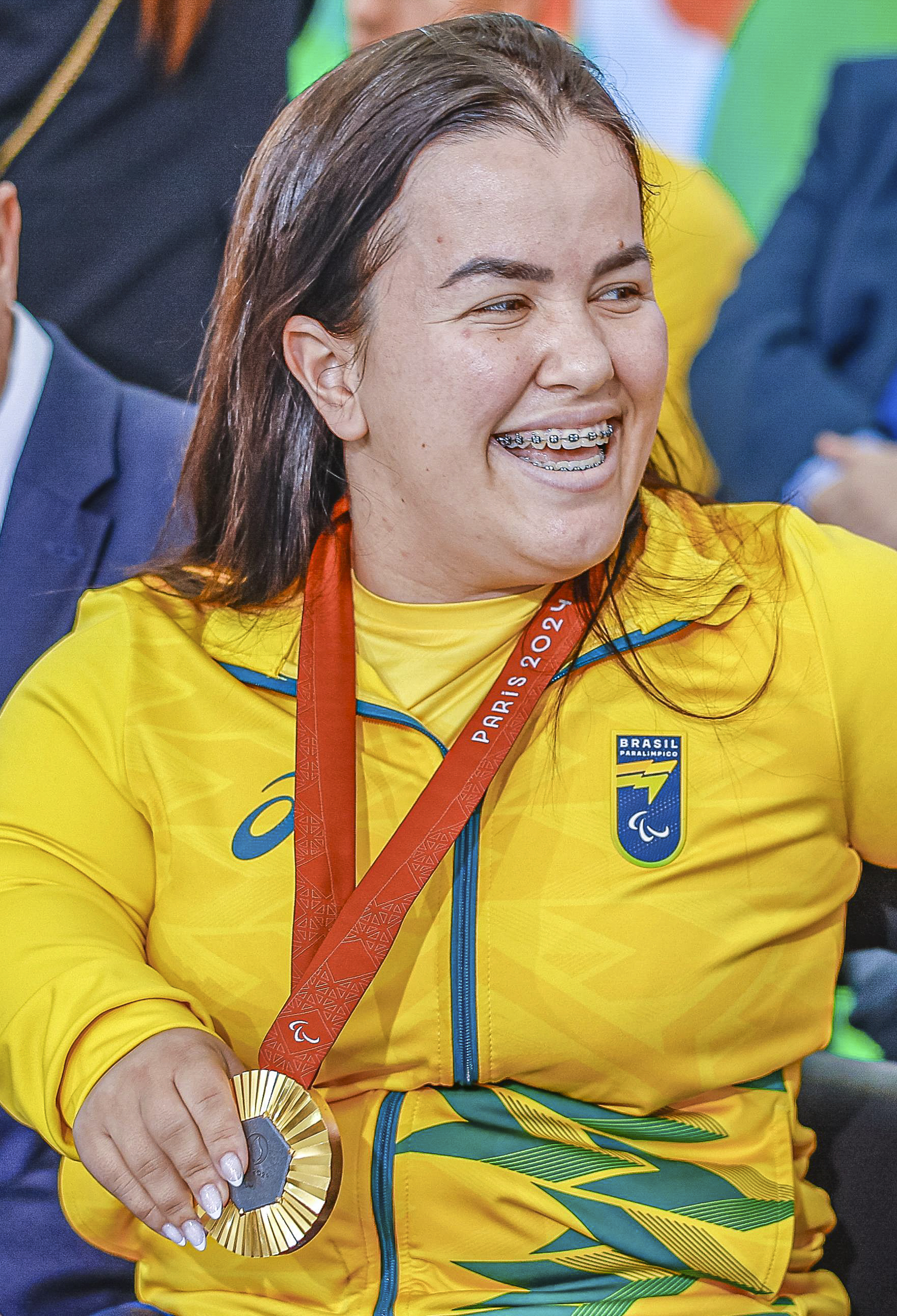
- D'Andrea in September 2024

Personal information
- Born: 12 February 1998 (age 28) Itu, São Paulo, Brazil

Sport
- Country: Brazil
- Sport: Paralympic powerlifting
Medal record
Women's paralympic powerlifting
Representing Brazil
Paralympic Games
Gold medal – first place	2020 Tokyo	73 kg
Gold medal – first place	2024 Paris	73 kg
World Championships
Gold medal – first place	2025 Cairo	Team
Silver medal – second place	2019 Nur-Sultan	Mixed team
Silver medal – second place	2021 Tbilisi	73 kg
Silver medal – second place	2025 Cairo	73 kg
Parapan American Games
Gold medal – first place	2023 Santiago	73 kg e 79 kg
Gold medal – first place	2019 Lima	61 and 67 kg
Bronze medal – third place	2023 Santiago	Mixed team
South American Para Games
Gold medal – first place	2026 Valledupar	73 kg & 79 kg
Gold medal – first place	2026 Valledupar	Team

Mariana D'Andrea (born 12 February 1998) is a Brazilian Paralympic powerlifter. She won the gold medal in the women's 73 kg event at the 2020 Summer Paralympics held in Tokyo, Japan. She is the first competitor representing Brazil to win a gold medal in powerlifting at the Paralympics. A few months later, she won the silver medal in her event at the 2021 World Para Powerlifting Championships held in Tbilisi, Georgia.

== Career ==
D'Andrea competed in the women's 61 kg event at the 2016 Summer Paralympics held in Rio de Janeiro, Brazil. She did not register a successful lift at this event. She also competed in the women's 61 kg event at the 2017 World Para Powerlifting Championships held in Mexico City, Mexico without registering a successful lift.

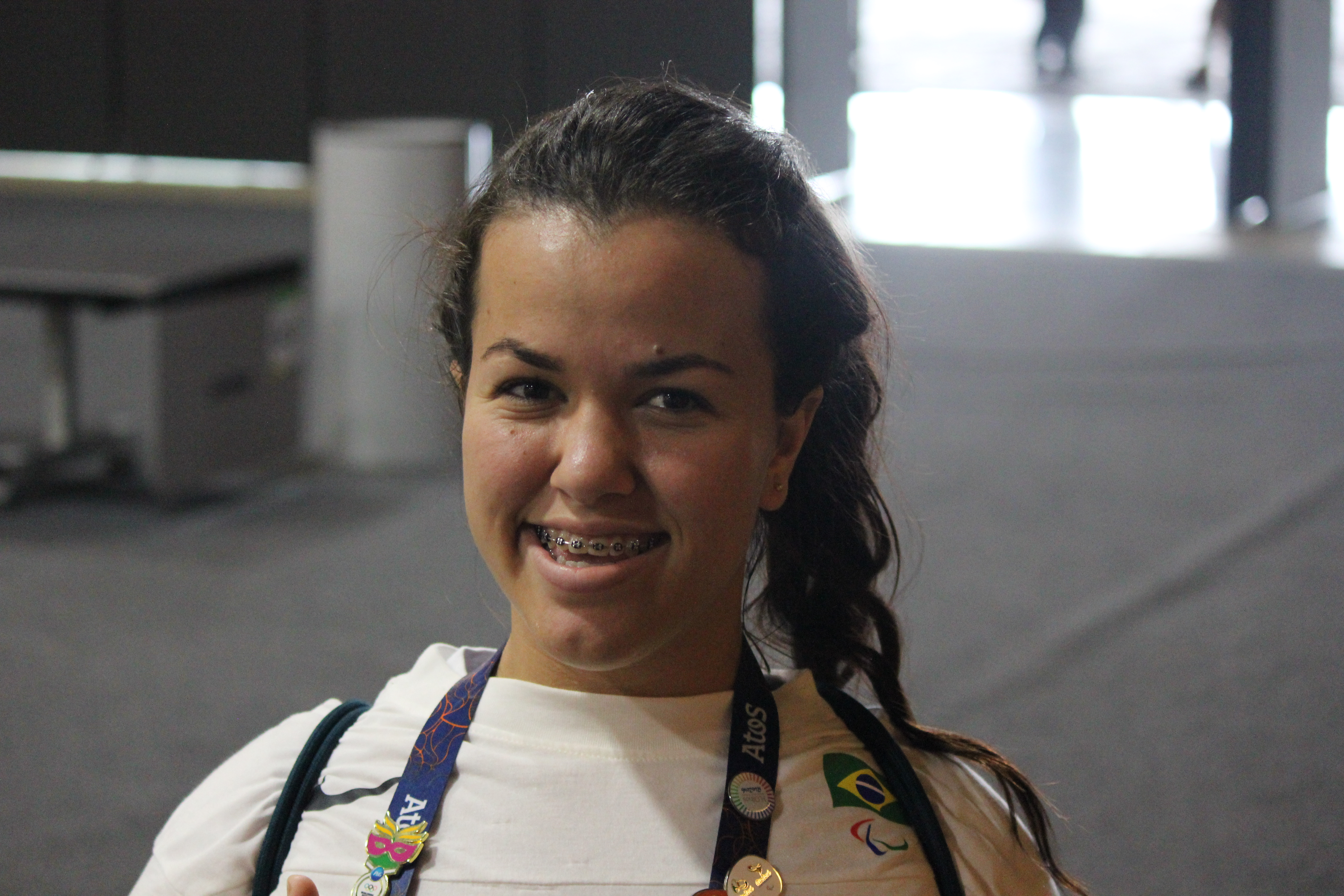
D’Andrea during the 2016 Summer Paralympics

At the 2019 World Para Powerlifting Championships held in Nur-Sultan, Kazakhstan, D'Andrea won the silver medal in the mixed team event. At the 2019 Parapan American Games held in Lima, Peru, she won the gold medal in the women's 61 and 67 kg (combined) event. She also set a new Parapan American record of 114.35 kg.

== Results ==
Year	Venue	Weight	Attempts (kg)			Total	Rank
Year	Venue	Weight	1	2	3	Total	Rank
Summer Paralympics
2016	Rio de Janeiro, Brazil	61 kg	~~96~~	~~96~~	~~101~~	–	NM
2021	Tokyo, Japan	73 kg	130	133	137	137	1st place, gold medalist(s)
2024	Paris, France	73 kg	141	143	148	~~152~~	1st place, gold medalist(s)
World Championships
2017	Mexico City, Mexico	61 kg	~~105~~	~~106~~	~~107~~	–	NM
2019	Nur-Sultan, Kazakhstan	67 kg	116	120	~~122~~	120	4
2021	Tbilisi, Georgia	73 kg	133	135	~~138~~	135	2nd place, silver medalist(s)
Parapan American Games
2019	Lima, Peru	61/67 kg	112	117	122	114.35	1st place, gold medalist(s)
