= Hamed Solhipour =

Iranian Paralympic powerlifter

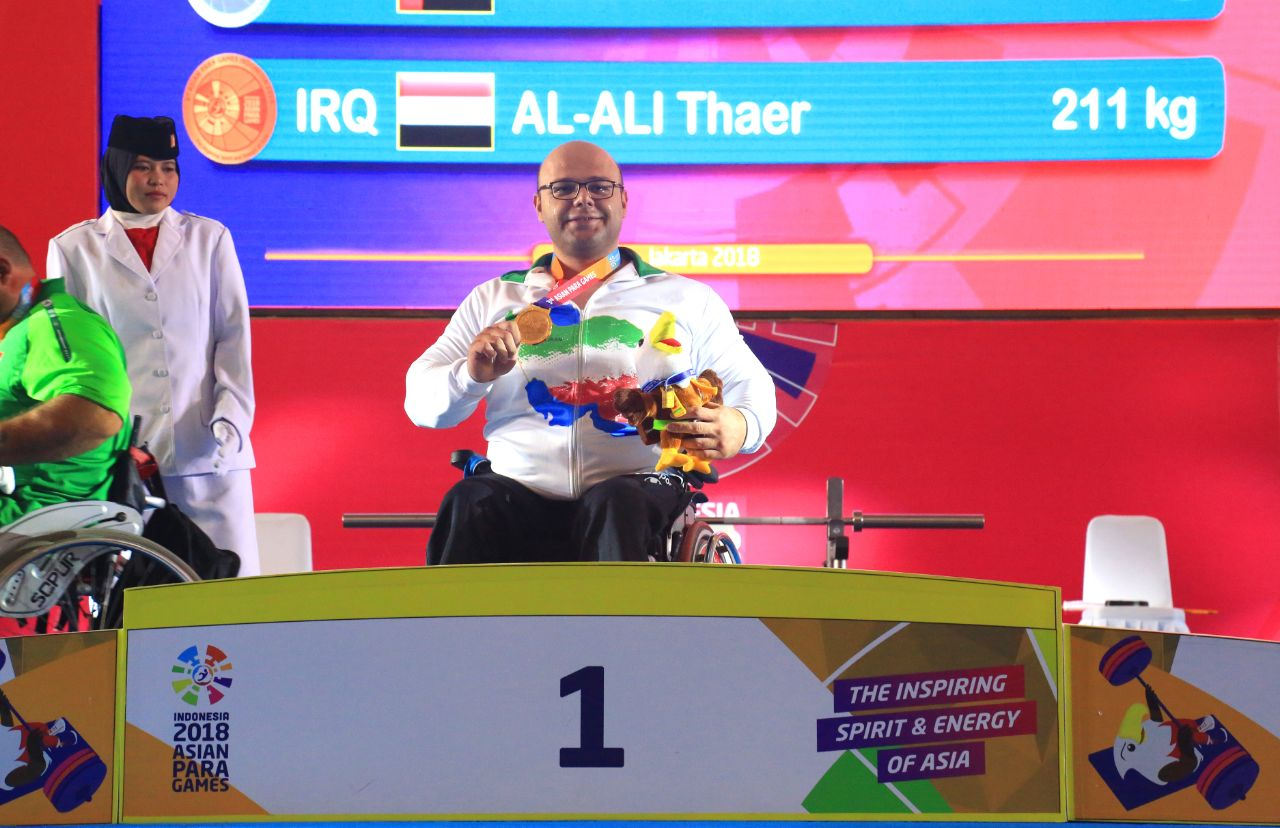

Personal information
- Full name: Seyed Hamed Solhipour Avanji
- Nationality: Iranian
- Born: 22 May 1989 (age 37) Tehran, Iran
- Weight: 97 kg (214 lb)

Sport
- Sport: Paralympic powerlifting, Bench Press
Medal record
Representing Iran
Paralympic
Silver medal – second place	2020 Tokyo	97 kg
Asian Para Games
Silver medal – second place	2010 Guangzhou	senior
Gold medal – first place	2014 Incheon	senior
Gold medal – first place	2018 Jakarta	senior

Seyed Hamed Solhipour Avanji (Persian: سید حامد صلحی‌پور اونجی; born 22 May 1989) is an Iranian Paralympic powerlifter and the World Champion in the 97 kg.

He has received two gold medals in the 2014 Incheon and 2018 Jakarta Asian Para Games.

== Beginnings ==
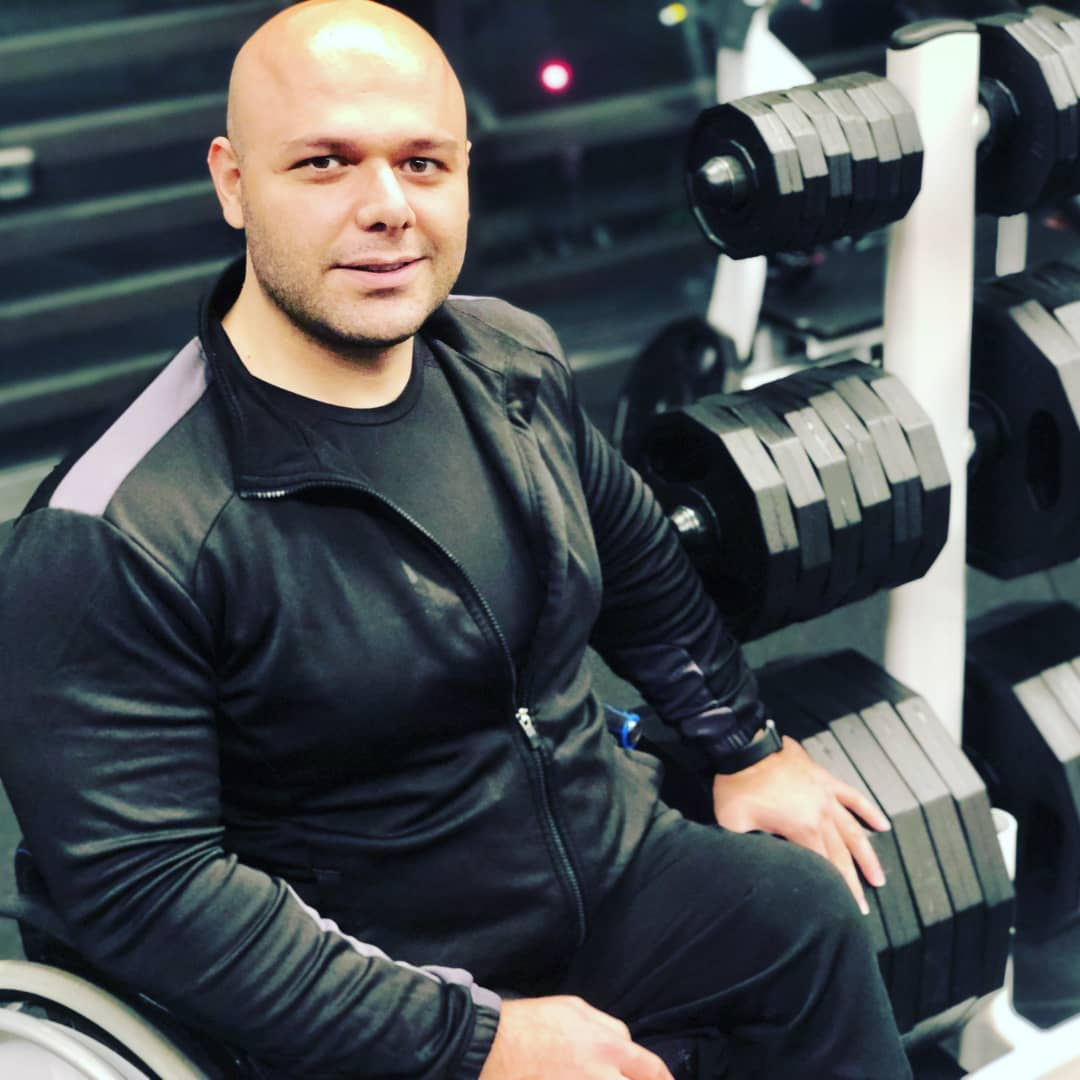
Solhipour while training

Solhipour started his sport activities at 15. At first, he experienced bodybuilding. In 2007, became a member of I.R. Iran National Para Powerlifting and attended in the 2008 USA Junior World Championships. In his first participation, he received a silver medal.

== Para powerlifting records ==
- He improved his World record 14 kg in the 2010 Malaysia Open Championships by the lift of 220 kg in the men's up to 90 kg and again remained Junior World record holder.
- He lifted 229.5 kg in the 2014 Incheon Para Asian Games in the men's up to 88 category and break the para Asian and world record.
- He lifted 234 kg in the 2018 Jakarta Para Asian Games in the men's up to 97 kg category and 1 kg improved the para Asian record.
- He lifted 235 kg in the 2019 Nur-Sultan World Championships in the men's up to 97 kg category and one kg improved his para Asian record in the 2018 Jakarta.

== Medals ==
1. 1st Place of Malaysia World Games in the youth category-2010
2. 1st Place of Libya International Games in youth category-2010
3. 1st Place of Libya International Games in adults category-2010
4. 1st place of Jordan World Games in youth category-2011
5. 1st Place of Jordan World Games in adults category-2011
6. 1st place of IWAS2001 World Games, Emirates
7. 1st Place of Malaysia World Games 2012
8. 1st place of incheon Asian Para Games South Korea 2014
9. 1st Place of Fazza International Championships Emirates 2016
10. 1st Place of Asian Championships Japan 2018
11. 1st Place of Jakarta Asian Para Games Indonesia 2018
12. 1st Place of World Championships Games Kazakhstan 2019
13. 1st Place of World Para Powerlifting World Cup Thailand 2021
14. 2nd Place of Asian Para Games Guangzhou 2010
15. 2nd Place of USA World Games in the youth category 2008
16. 2nd Place of World Championships Games Dubai 2014 Emirates
17. 2nd place of Asia Almaty Championship Kazakhstan 2015
18. 2nd Place of Almaty Free Championships Kazakhstan 2015
19. 2nd Place of World Championships Kazakhstan 2015
20. 3rd Place of World Games 2011 Emirates Sharjah
21. 3rd Place of Asia Championships Malaysia 2013
22. 4th place of Paraolampic Games London 2012
23. Attendance in Paraolampic Games rio 2016 Brazil
