= Mohamed Elelfat =

Egyptian Paralympic powerlifter (born 1979)

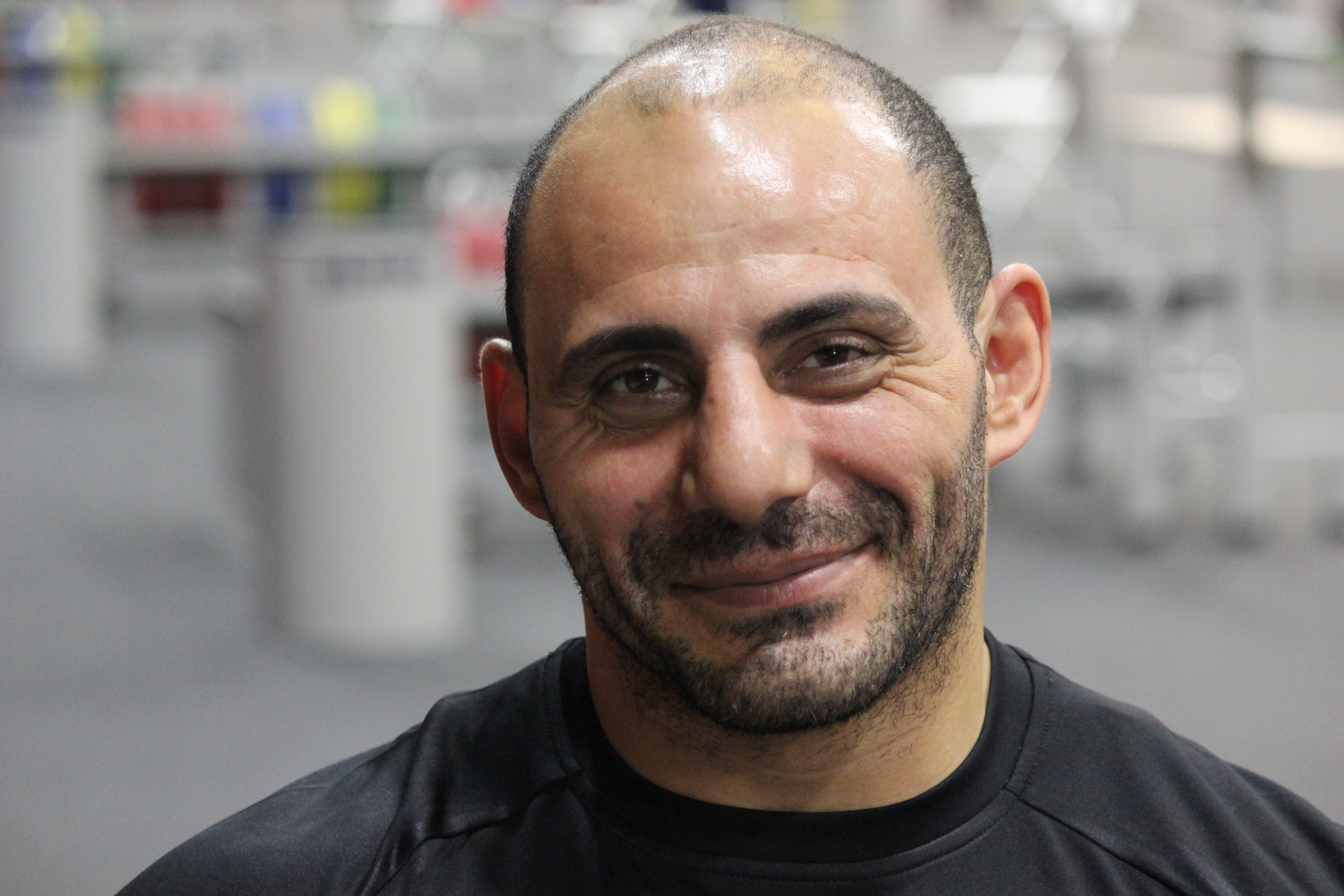
- Elelfat in Rio for the 2016 Summer Paralympics

Personal information
- Nationality: Egyptian
- Born: 25 June 1979 (age 47)

Achievements and titles
- Paralympic finals: 2008; 2012; 2016; 2020
Medal record
Representing Egypt
Powerlifting
Paralympic Games
Silver medal – second place	2012 London	75 kg
Silver medal – second place	2024 Paris	88 kg
Bronze medal – third place	2020 Tokyo	80 kg
World Championships
Gold medal – first place	2014 Dubai	72 kg
Gold medal – first place	2019 Nur-Sultan	Mixed team
Bronze medal – third place	2019 Nur-Sultan	80 kg
Bronze medal – third place	2021 Tbilisi	80 kg

Mohamed Elelfat (born 25 June 1979) is an Egyptian Paralympic powerlifter competing in the -72 kg class. Elelfat has participated in four Summer Paralympic Games winning silver in the -75 kg category in the 2012 Games in London. He also won the bronze medal in the men's 80 kg event at the 2020 Summer Paralympics held in Tokyo, Japan. A few months later, he won the bronze medal in his event at the 2021 World Para Powerlifting Championships held in Tbilisi, Georgia.

== Personal history ==
Elelfat was born in Egypt in 1979. He was educated at Menoufia University in Al Minufya. He is married and has one child.
