= Loveline Obiji =

Nigerian Paralympic powerlifter

Personal information
- Nationality: Nigerian
- Born: 11 September 1990 (age 35) Umueze Anam, Nigeria
- Weight: 84 kg (185 lb)

Sport
- Sport: Powerlifting
- Event: +61 kg
Medal record
Women's Powerlifting
Representing Nigeria
Paralympic Games
Gold medal – first place	2012 London	82.5 kg
Silver medal – second place	2020 Tokyo	+86 kg
Commonwealth Games
Gold medal – first place	2014 Glasgow	+61 kg
- Updated on 11 October 2014

Loveline Obiji (born 11 September 1990) is a Nigerian powerlifter. She competed in the women's +61 kg event at the 2014 Commonwealth Games where she won a gold medal.

At the 2014 World Championships she was the 86 kg category gold medal briefly as Randa Mahmoud's record setting last lift was not allowed. However Mahmoud appealed and her lift was allowed giving her the gold medal and the world record. Obiji took the silver.
