= Riocentro =

Exhibition and convention center located in Rio de Janeiro, Brazil

Coordinates: 22°58′45″S 43°24′48″W

Riocentro is an exhibition and convention center located in Rio de Janeiro, Brazil. Built in 1977, it is the largest exhibition center in Latin America.

== Notable events ==
=== 1981 May Day attack ===
On April 30, 1981, during a May Day music concert, Riocentro was the target of a terrorist attack by hardliner members of the Brazilian military dictatorship (1964–1985). Sergeant Guilherme Pereira do Rosário and then-Captain Wilson Dias Machado, nowadays a Colonel, were responsible for detonating two bombs at the venue. Around 9 p.m., however, one of the bombs exploded in the lap of Sergeant Rosário, killing him and seriously wounding Machado. A second bomb exploded a few miles away at a powerhouse responsible for providing electrical energy to Riocentro; it was thrown over the fence and exploded on the ground, and the electric power supply was never interrupted that evening. The government immediately blamed left-wing radicals for the attack. This theory had no support at the time of the event and nowadays there is strong evidence that the attack was planned by the hardline sector of the government to convince the moderate sector that the left-wing urban guerrilla was still active and that a new wave of political repression was required. This episode marked the decline of the military regime in Brazil, which would officially end four years later.

=== Earth Summit ===
In 1992, Riocentro hosted the United Nations Earth Summit.

=== Sports events ===
In 2007, Riocentro hosted a variety of events for the Pan American Games in several pavilions. Capacity of the pavilions ranges from 2,000 people to 4,500 people. When Rio was bidding for the 2016 Summer Olympics and Paralympics which it won in October 2009, four of its six pavilions were proposed as venues. During these games, Pavilion 2 hosted the Olympic boxing competitions, Pavilion 3 hosted the Olympic and Paralympic table tennis competitions, Pavilion 4 hosted the badminton competitions, and Pavilion 6 hosted the Olympic weightlifting and Paralympic powerlifting events. During the 2014 FIFA World Cup, Riocentro was utilised as the headquarters of the International Broadcast Centre (IBC).

In November 2022, the arena hosted the Challengers Stage and the Legends Stage of the IEM Rio Major 2022, the eighteenth Counter-Strike: Global Offensive (CS:GO) Major Championship.
