= Souhad Ghazouani =

French Paralympic powerlifter

Personal information
- Born: 7 August 1982 (age 43)

Sport
- Country: France
- Sport: Paralympic powerlifting
- Disability: Paraplegia

Souhad Ghazouani (born 7 August 1982) is a French powerlifter born with paraplegia. She started lifting weights at age six. At the 2004 Summer Paralympics she won silver and in that same year was made a Knight of the National Order of Merit. At the 2008 Summer Paralympics she won a bronze. At the 2012 Summer Paralympics she won gold at the 67.5 kg. She also has a world record in her discipline. She is also a wheelchair racer.

She won the bronze medal in the women's 73 kg event at the 2020 Summer Paralympics held in Tokyo, Japan.
