= Josephine Orji =

Nigerian Paralympic powerlifter (born 1979)

Josephine Precious Orji
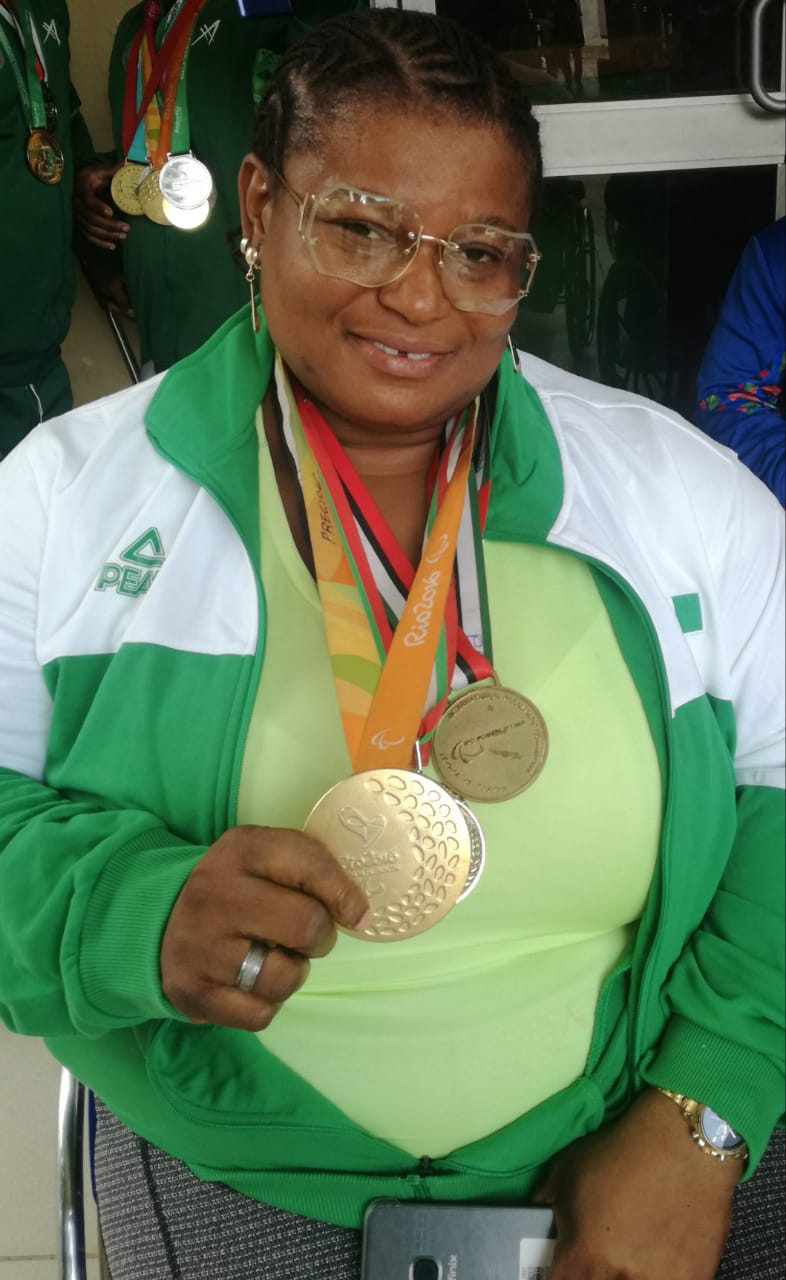
- Orji with her world record gold medal for Nigeria

Personal information
- Nickname: Precious
- Born: 8 April 1979 (age 47)
- Weight: 134 kg (295 lb)
Medal record
Women's Weightlifting
Representing Nigeria
Paralympics Games
Gold medal – first place	Rio 2016	Women's +86 kg

Josephine Precious Orji (born 8 April 1979) is a Nigerian professional powerlifter. On 14 September 2016, she won gold in the women's +86kg category at the 2016 Summer Paralympics in Brazil before she went on to set a new world and Games record by lifting 160 kg (350 lb) at the same event.

== Career ==
Josephine developed a passion for powerlifting in 2001 after visiting a gym in Owerri and trying out the sport for the first time. Afterwards, she quit her job as a computer expert in a cyber café and commenced her training to develop a career in sport as a powerlifter.
