= World Para Powerlifting Championships =

Sports event

- Sport: Para Powerlifting
- Founded: 1994
- Continent: International (IPC)
- Broadcaster: https://www.paralympic.org/powerlifting

The World Para Powerlifting Championships, known before 30 November 2016 as the IPC Powerlifting World Championships, is an event organized by the International Paralympic Committee (IPC). Competitors with a physical disability compete, and in a few events athletes with an intellectual disability compete. First held in 1994, the competition was held every four years. Since 2017, it is held every two years. The competitions are also part of the qualification process to compete at the Summer Paralympics.

== History ==
The first IPC Powerlifting World Championships were held in Uppsala, Sweden in 1994. On 30 November 2016, the IPC, which serves as the international federation for 10 disability sports, including powerlifting, adopted the "World Para" brand for all 10 sports. The world championship events in all of these sports were immediately rebranded as "World Para" championships. In 2023 total medals and 3 age-events added to competitions. This events have not classes for blind or deaf person.

== Editions ==
=== Ages ===
1. Senior: All Editions
2. Junior (U20): 2002 or 2006–2021
3. Team Events: Since 2019
4. Rookie (14–17): Since 2023
5. Next Gen (18–20): Since 2023
6. Legend (+45): Since 2023

=== Best & Total ===
- 1994-2021: Medal awarded in Best Lifts.
- 2023-Ongoing: Medal awarded in Best and Total Lifts.

=== Games ===
Edition	Year	Host city	Host country	Dates	Most Golds	Events	Athletes
1	1994	Uppsala	Sweden			10	137
2	1998	Dubai	United Arab Emirates			20	269
3	2002	Kuala Lumpur	Malaysia			20	234
4	2006	Busan	South Korea	3 – 11 May	China	20	300
5	2010	Kuala Lumpur	Malaysia	25 – 31 July	Egypt	20	292
6	2014	Dubai	United Arab Emirates	5 – 11 April	Nigeria	20	330
7	2017	Mexico City	Mexico	2 – 8 December	China	20	333
8	2019	Nur-Sultan	Kazakhstan	12 – 20 July	China	20	430
9	2021	Tbilisi	Georgia	27 November – 5 December	China	20	437
10	2023	Dubai	United Arab Emirates	22 – 30 August	China	20	471
11	2025	Cairo	Egypt	10 – 18 October	China	20	537
12	2027	Mexico City	Mexico				

== Medals ==
=== Seniors Best (2010-2023) ===
Rank	Nation	Gold	Silver	Bronze	Total
1	China (CHN)	31	28	18	77
2	Egypt (EGY)	20	14	17	51
3	Nigeria (NGR)	18	10	10	38
4	Iran (IRI)	16	19	6	41
5	Russia (RUS)	5	6	12	23
6	Jordan (JOR)	5	4	5	14
7	Ukraine (UKR)	3	5	8	16
8	Mexico (MEX)	3	2	6	11
9	Malaysia (MAS)	3	0	0	3
10	Turkey (TUR)	2	4	3	9
11	Vietnam (VIE)	2	4	1	7
12	Great Britain (GBR)	2	2	1	5
13	Chinese Taipei (TPE)	2	0	1	3
13	France (FRA)	2	0	1	3
15	Kazakhstan (KAZ)	2	0	0	2
16	Mongolia (MGL)	1	3	0	4
17	Brazil (BRA)	1	1	3	5
18	Greece (GRE)	1	1	2	4
19	Algeria (ALG)	1	1	1	3
20	Iraq (IRQ)	0	2	7	9
21	Poland (POL)	0	2	2	4
21	Uzbekistan (UZB)	0	2	2	4
23	El Salvador (ESA)	0	2	0	2
23	Venezuela (VEN)	0	2	0	2
25	Libya (LBA)	0	1	1	2
26	Australia (AUS)	0	1	0	1
26	Cuba (CUB)	0	1	0	1
26	Italy (ITA)	0	1	0	1
26	Thailand (THA)	0	1	0	1
26	United Arab Emirates (UAE)	0	1	0	1
31	Colombia (COL)	0	0	3	3
32	Azerbaijan (AZE)	0	0	2	2
32	Chile (CHI)	0	0	2	2
32	Indonesia (INA)	0	0	2	2
35	Belarus (BLR)	0	0	1	1
35	India (IND)	0	0	1	1
35	Netherlands (NED)	0	0	1	1
35	Syria (SYR)	0	0	1	1
Totals (38 entries)		120	120	120	360

=== Seniors Total (2023) ===
Rank	Nation	Gold	Silver	Bronze	Total
1	China (CHN)	8	2	3	13
2	Nigeria (NGR)	2	2	0	4
2	Ukraine (UKR)	2	2	0	4
4	Great Britain (GBR)	2	0	0	2
5	Iran (IRI)	1	1	1	3
6	Malaysia (MAS)	1	1	0	2
7	Brazil (BRA)	1	0	1	2
8	India (IND)	1	0	0	1
8	Jordan (JOR)	1	0	0	1
8	Poland (POL)	1	0	0	1
11	Uzbekistan (UZB)	0	2	1	3
12	Colombia (COL)	0	1	2	3
13	South Korea (KOR)	0	1	1	2
14	Chile (CHI)	0	1	0	1
14	El Salvador (ESA)	0	1	0	1
14	Italy (ITA)	0	1	0	1
14	Kazakhstan (KAZ)	0	1	0	1
14	Morocco (MAR)	0	1	0	1
14	United Arab Emirates (UAE)	0	1	0	1
14	Venezuela (VEN)	0	1	0	1
14	Vietnam (VIE)	0	1	0	1
22	Egypt (EGY)	0	0	4	4
23	Algeria (ALG)	0	0	1	1
23	Argentina (ARG)	0	0	1	1
23	Greece (GRE)	0	0	1	1
23	Iraq (IRQ)	0	0	1	1
23	Kyrgyzstan (KGZ)	0	0	1	1
23	Syria (SYR)	0	0	1	1
23	Turkey (TUR)	0	0	1	1
Totals (29 entries)		20	20	20	60

=== Mixed Team (2019-2021) ===
Rank	Nation	Gold	Silver	Bronze	Total
1	Chile (CHI)	1	0	0	1
1	Egypt (EGY)	1	0	0	1
3	Ukraine (UKR)	0	1	1	2
4	Brazil (BRA)	0	1	0	1
5	Colombia (COL)	0	0	1	1
Totals (5 entries)		2	2	2	6

=== Juniors (2021) ===
Rank	Nation	Gold	Silver	Bronze	Total
1	Great Britain (GBR)	3	1	1	5
2	Russia (RUS)	2	0	1	3
3	Mexico (MEX)	2	0	0	2
3	Ukraine (UKR)	2	0	0	2
5	Egypt (EGY)	1	1	0	2
5	Iraq (IRQ)	1	1	0	2
7	Brazil (BRA)	1	0	2	3
8	Azerbaijan (AZE)	1	0	1	2
9	Algeria (ALG)	1	0	0	1
9	Iran (IRI)	1	0	0	1
11	Kazakhstan (KAZ)	0	3	1	4
12	Jordan (JOR)	0	1	0	1
12	Kyrgyzstan (KGZ)	0	1	0	1
14	Belarus (BLR)	0	0	1	1
Totals (14 entries)		15	8	7	30

== See also ==
- World Para Athletics Championships
- World Para Swimming Championships
- World Shooting Para Sport Championships
- World Para Taekwondo Championships
- World Para Karate Championships
- World Para Cycling Championships
- World Para Archery Championships
- World Para Climbing Championships

== Links ==
- Paralympic Powerlifting
- Results
- Live results
