= Vietnam at the Paralympics =

- IPC code: VIE
- NPC: Vietnam Paralympic Association
- Officials: 5
- Medals: Gold 1 Silver 2 Bronze 3 Total 6

Summer appearances
- 2000; 2004; 2008; 2012; 2016; 2020; 2024

Vietnam made its Paralympic Games debut at the 2000 Summer Paralympics in Sydney, with just two competitors: Nguyen Thi Xuan Anh in the women's 800m sprint (T54 category) in athletics, and Truong Cong Hung in the men's up to 52 kg category in powerlifting. The country's delegation in 2004 was slightly larger, and entirely composed of women, with a female sprinter, two female powerlifters and a female swimmer. In 2012, Vietnam fielded its largest delegation to date, with eleven athletes across three sports: track and field, powerlifting and swimming.

Vietnam has never taken part in the Winter Paralympics. The country has won one gold medal, two silver medals and two bronze medals.

== Summer Paralympic Games ==
=== Medals by Games ===
Games	Athletes	Gold	Silver	Bronze	Total	Rank
(Australia) Sydney 2000	2	0	0	0	0	−
(Greece) Athens 2004	4	0	0	0	0	−
(China) Beijing 2008	9	0	0	0	0	−
(United Kingdom) London 2012	11	0	0	0	0	−
(Brazil) Rio de Janeiro 2016	11	1	1	2	4	55
(Japan) Tokyo 2020	7	0	1	0	1	75
(France) Paris 2024	7	0	0	1	1	79
(United States) Los Angeles 2028	Future Event					
(Australia) Brisbane 2032	Future Event					
Total		1	2	3	6	93

=== Medals by sport ===
Sport	Gold	Silver	Bronze	Total
Powerlifting	1	1	1	3
Swimming	0	1	0	1
Athletics	0	0	1	1
Totals (3 entries)	1	2	2	5

=== Medals by individual ===
Black	Name	Games	Sport	Event
Gold	Lê Văn Công	(Brazil) 2016 Rio de Janeiro	Powerlifting	Men's 49 kg
Silver	Võ Thanh Tùng	(Brazil) 2016 Rio de Janeiro	Swimming	Men's 50 m freestyle S5
Bronze	Dang Thi Linh Phuong	(Brazil) 2016 Rio de Janeiro	Powerlifting	Women's 50 kg
Bronze	Cao Ngọc Hùng	(Brazil) 2016 Rio de Janeiro	Athletics	Men's javelin throw
Silver	Lê Văn Công	(Japan) 2020 Tokyo	Powerlifting	Men's 49 kg
Bronze	Lê Văn Công	(France) 2024 Paris	Powerlifting	Men's −49 kg

== See also ==
- Vietnam at the Olympics
