= Vietnam at the 2012 Summer Paralympics =

- IPC code: VIE
- NPC: Vietnam Paralympic Association

in London
- Competitors: 11 in 3 sports
- Medals: Gold 0 Silver 0 Bronze 0 Total 0

Summer Paralympics appearances (overview)
- 2000; 2004; 2008; 2012; 2016; 2020; 2024

Vietnam competed at the 2012 Summer Paralympics in London. This was the third participation of Vietnam at the Paralympics after Athens 2004 and Beijing 2008. The country was represented by 11 competitors, who participated in three sports. The Vietnam team in 2012 comprised: Athletics: Nguyễn Thị Hải, Cao Ngọc Hùng (flagbearer), Trịnh Công Luận. Swimming: Võ Thanh Tùng., Nguyễn Thành Trung, Dương Thị Lan, Trịnh Thị Bích Như. Powerlifting: Nguyễn Thị Hồng, Châu Hoàng Tuyết Loan, Nguyễn Văn Phúc, Nguyễn Bình An. They did not win any medals.

== Athletics ==
Men’s Field Events

Athlete	Event	Distance	Points	Rank
Trịnh Công Luận	Discus Throw F54-56	26.76	551	13
Cao Ngọc Hùng	Discus Throw F57-58	NM		
Cao Ngọc Hùng	Javelin Throw F57-58	46.51	964	4

Women’s Field Events

Athlete	Event	Distance	Points	Rank
Nguyễn Thị Hải	Discus Throw F57-58	28.47	647	11
Nguyễn Thị Hải	Javelin Throw F57-58	25.37	851	4

== Powerlifting ==
Men

Athlete	Event	Result	Rank
Nguyễn Văn Phúc	-48kg	145	7
Nguyễn Bình An	-52kg	163	4

Women

Athlete	Event	Result	Rank
Nguyễn Thị Hồng	-40kg	88	4
Châu Hoàng Tuyết Loan	-52kg	104	5

== Swimming ==
Men

Athletes	Event	Heat		Final	
Athletes	Event	Time	Rank	Time	Rank
Võ Thanh Tùng	50m freestyle S5	35.43	6 Q	36.05	7
Võ Thanh Tùng	100m freestyle S5	1:21.94	6 Q	1:19.83	6
Võ Thanh Tùng	50m backstroke S5	42.26	5 Q	42.59	6
Võ Thanh Tùng	50m butterfly S5	43.82	10	did not advance	
Nguyễn Thành Trung	100m breaststroke SB4	1:52.14	7 Q	1:53.60	8

Women

Athletes	Event	Heat		Final	
Athletes	Event	Time	Rank	Time	Rank
Dương Thị Lan	100m breaststroke SB5	2:12.49	13	did not advance	
Trịnh Thị Bích Như	100m breaststroke SB5	2:11.80	12	did not advance	

== See also ==
- Vietnam at the 2012 Summer Olympics
