= Vietnam at the 2016 Summer Paralympics =

- IPC code: VIE
- NPC: Vietnam Paralympic Association

in Rio de Janeiro
- Competitors: 11 in 4 sports
- Flag bearer: Nguyễn Thành Trung
- Medals Ranked 55th: Gold 1 Silver 1 Bronze 2 Total 4

Summer Paralympics appearances (overview)
- 2000; 2004; 2008; 2012; 2016; 2020; 2024

Vietnam competed at the 2016 Summer Paralympics in Rio de Janeiro, Brazil, from 7 September to 18 September 2016.

== Support ==
In September 2015, Deputy Director of the General Department of Sports and Physical Training, Pham Van Tuan attended the Rio 2016 Paralympic Games Chef de Mission seminar as part of the country's preparation efforts for the 2016 Games. He talked to representatives from Japan, South Korea, Russia and the Asian Paralympic Committee about increasing mutual cooperation.

In February 2015, 12 athletes attended a training event at the National Sports Training Centre in Ho Chi Minh City as part of Paralympic readiness training.

== Medallists ==
Medal	Name	Sport	Event	Date
Gold	Lê Văn Công	Powerlifting	Men's 49 kg	8 September
Silver	Võ Thanh Tùng	Swimming	50 m freestyle S5	13 September
Bronze	Đặng Thị Linh Phượng	Powerlifting	Women's 50 kg	10 September
Bronze	Cao Ngọc Hùng	Athletics	Javelin throw F56/57	13 September

== Athletics ==
Athletics was one of three sports which Vietnam planned to send its athletes to compete in at the Rio Games. Athletes identified as potential Rio qualifiers included Cao Ngoc Hung, Nguyen Be Hau, Nguyen Ngoc Hiep and Nguyen Thi Nhan. Vietnamese track and field competitors participated in the 2015 World Championships in Doha, Qatar as part of their readiness for Rio campaign.

Field Events - Men

Athlete	Events	Result	Rank
Ngoc Hiep Nguyen	Long jump T11	4.08	11
Cao Ngọc Hùng	Javelin throw F56/57	43.27	3rd place, bronze medalist(s)

Field Events - Women

Athlete	Events	Result	Rank
Thi Nhan Nguyen	Long Jump T11	4.01	10

== Powerlifting ==
Powerlifting is one of three sports which Vietnam plans to send athletes to compete in at the Rio Games. Lifters identified as potential Rio qualifiers included Le Van Cong, Nguyen Binh An, Dang Thi Linh Phuong and Chau Hoang Tuyet Loan.

Le Van Cong and Nguyen Binh An are powerlifters from Vietnam. They competed at the 2015 ASEAN Para Games as part of their 2016 Paralympic Games preparation. Cong won gold in the 49kg event and An won gold in the 54kg event. Tung, Cong and An hang their hopes of going to Rio on 2016 European Open Swimming Championships, where they will need to qualify.

Vietnamese powerlifters participated in the 2015 Asian Championships in July. The event was held in Almaty, Kazakhstan, and was part of their qualifying efforts.

Women

Athlete	Event	Result	Rank
Hoang Tuyet Loan Chau	-55 kg	88.0	8
Đặng Thị Linh Phượng	-50 kg	102.0	3rd place, bronze medalist(s)

Men

Athlete	Event	Result	Rank
Nguyễn Bình An	-54 kg	Did not finish	
Lê Văn Công	-49 kg	181	(gold) WR

== Swimming ==
Swimming is one of three sports which Vietnam plans to send athletes to compete in at the Rio Games. Vietnamese swimmers participated in the World Championships as part of their efforts to prepare for the Games. Swimmers identified as potential Rio qualifiers included Trinh Thi Bich Nhu, Vo Thanh Tung, Nguyen Thanh Trung and Do Thanh Hai. The swimmers are coached by Dong Quoc Cuong.

For only the second time in the country's history, they participated in the 2015 IPC Swimming World Championships. The country sent five swimmers who were trying to qualify for Rio. The team had been based at the HCM City for most of the year in preparation for qualifying. Can Tho-born Tung competed in five events at the world championships. The swimmer from Can Tho Province went into the event with five gold medals that he won at the 2014 Asian Para Games and having represented Vietnam at the 2012 Summer Paralympics. Do Thanh Hai competed in the men's 100m backstroke and 100m breast stroke-SB4. Trinh Thi Bich Nhu secured her Rio qualification at the 2015 World Championships in the SB5 100m breaststroke event with a time of 1:57.43. Her silver medal in the event was the first won by a para-swimmer from Vietnam, male or female, at an international swimming event. She competed at the world championships in two events, women's 100m butterfly and 50m freestyle-SP5.

Men

Athlete	Event	Heat		Final	
Athlete	Event	Result	Rank	Result	Rank
Thanh Hai Do	100 m breaststroke SB5	1:40.96	7 Q	1:40.31	7
Thanh Trung Nguyen	100 m breaststroke SB4	1:48.93	7 Q	1:49.67	6
Thanh Trung Nguyen	50 m backstroke S5	45.91	10	Did not qualify	
Thanh Tung Vo	50 m freestyle S5	33.87	2 Q	33.94	2nd place, silver medalist(s)
Thanh Tung Vo	100 m freestyle S5	1:17.64	3 Q	1:18.02	5
Thanh Tung Vo	50 m butterfly S5	38.76	6 Q	39.44	7
Thanh Tung Vo	50 m backstroke S5	39.62	3 Q	40.13	4

Women

Athlete	Event	Heat		Final	
Athlete	Event	Result	Rank	Result	Rank
Thi Bich Nhu Trinh	100 m breaststroke SB5	1:52.06	7 Q	1:51.07	6
Thi Bich Nhu Trinh	50 m butterfly S6	42.08	7 Q	42.58	8
Thi Bich Nhu Trinh	50 m freestyle S6	37.23	9	Did not qualify	

== See also ==
- Vietnam at the 2016 Summer Olympics
