= Vietnam at the 2020 Summer Paralympics =

- IPC code: VIE
- NPC: Vietnam Paralympic Association

in Tokyo
- Competitors: 7 in 3 sports
- Flag bearer: Cao Ngọc Hùng
- Medals Ranked 75th: Gold 0 Silver 1 Bronze 0 Total 1

Summer Paralympics appearances (overview)
- 2000; 2004; 2008; 2012; 2016; 2020; 2024

Vietnam competed at the 2020 Summer Paralympics in Tokyo, Japan, from 24 August to 5 September 2021.

== Medalists ==
Medal	Name	Sport	Event	Date
Silver	Lê Văn Công	Powerlifting	Men's 49 kg	26 August

== Competitors ==
The following is the list of number of competitors participating in the Games:

Sport	Men	Women	Total
Athletics	1	1	2
Powerlifting	1	1	2
Swimming	2	1	3
Total	4	3	7

== Athletics ==
One Vietnamese javelin thrower, Cao Ngọc Hùng (F57) successfully to break through the qualifications for the 2020 Paralympics after breaking the qualification limit.

Field Events - Men

Athlete	Events	Result	Rank
Cao Ngọc Hùng	Javelin throw F57	43.91	6

Field Events - Women

Athlete	Events	Result	Rank
Nguyễn Thị Hải	Shot put F57	8.20	10
Nguyễn Thị Hải	Discus throw F57	27.39	9

== Powerlifting ==
Athlete	Events	Result	Rank
Lê Văn Công	Men's –49kg	173	2nd place, silver medalist(s)
Châu Hoàng Tuyết Loan	Women's –55kg	103	6

== Swimming ==
Three Vietnamese swimmer has successfully entered the paralympic slot after breaking the MQS.

Men

Athlete	Event	Heat		Final	
Athlete	Event	Result	Rank	Result	Rank
Đỗ Thanh Hải	100 m breaststroke SB5	1.35.97	4	1.35.68	6
Võ Thanh Tùng	50 m freestyle S5				
Võ Thanh Tùng	100 m freestyle S5	1:20.51	6	did not advance	
Võ Thanh Tùng	200 m freestyle S5	3:14.11	7	did not advance	
Võ Thanh Tùng	50 m butterfly S5	DSQ		Did not advance	
Võ Thanh Tùng	50 m backstroke S5	40:07	5	Did not advance	

Women

Athlete	Event	Heat		Final	
Athlete	Event	Result	Rank	Result	Rank
Trịnh Thị Bích Như	100 m breaststroke SB5	1.53.31	4	1.53.00	7
Trịnh Thị Bích Như	50 m freestyle S6	39:14	8	did not advance	
Trịnh Thị Bích Như	50 m butterfly S6	42.60	7	Did not advance	
Trịnh Thị Bích Như	200 m medley SM6	3:35.16	7	did not advance	

== See also ==
- Vietnam at the Paralympics
- Vietnam at the 2020 Summer Olympics
