= Athletics at the 2008 Summer Paralympics – Men's 400 metres T11 =

The Men's 400m T11 had its first round held on September 14, beginning at 11:15. The Semifinals were held on September 15, at 17:10 and the Final was held on September 16 at 19:54.

== Medalists ==
Gold	Lucas Prado; Brazil
Silver	Jose Armando; Angola
Bronze	Oleksandr Ivaniukhin; Ukraine

== Results ==
Place	Athlete	Round 1	Semifinals	Final
1	Lucas Prado (BRA)	51.84 Q	51.84 Q	50.27
2	Jose Armando (ANG)	51.52 Q	51.32 q	50.44
3	Oleksandr Ivaniukhin (UKR)	52.70 Q	50.79 Q	50.82
4	Daniel Silva (BRA)	52.47 Q	51.93 q	52.05
5	Tresor Makunda (FRA)	52.89 q	51.99	
6	Octavio dos Santos (ANG)	52.66 q	52.52	
7	Jon Dunkerley (CAN)	54.59 q	54.27	
8	Dao van Cuong (VIE)	54.38 q	54.36	
9	Aladji Ba (FRA)	54.98		
10	Matthias Schmidt (GER)	55.38		
11	Dustin Walsh (CAN)	55.48		
12	Kitsana Jorchuy (THA)	56.78		
	Arian Iznaga (CUB)	DNS		
