= Athletics at the 2008 Summer Paralympics – Men's 200 metres T11 =

The Men's 200m T11 had its first round held on September 11, beginning at 10:00. The Semifinals were held on September 12, at 17:25 and the A and B Finals were held on September 13 at 10:47.

== Medalists ==
Gold	Lucas Prado; Brazil
Silver	José Armando; Angola
Bronze	Arián Iznaga; Cuba

== Results ==
Place	Athlete	Round 1	Semifinals	Final B	Final A
1	Lucas Prado (BRA)	23.24 Q	22.71 Q PR	—	22.48 WR
2	José Armando (ANG)	23.05 Q	22.83 Q	—	22.70
3	Arián Iznaga (CUB)	22.91 Q	22.95 Q	—	22.79
4	Daniel Silva (BRA)	23.20 Q	23.17 q	—	23.38
5	Octavio dos Santos (ANG)	23.69 q	23.47 q	23.78	
6	Firmino Baptista (POR)	24.15 q	24.09 q	24.13	
7	Trésor Makunda (FRA)	23.84 q	23.34 q	25.55	
8	Oleksandr Ivaniukhin (UKR)	23.53 Q	23.27 q	27.93	
9	Miguel Francisco (ANG)	24.06 q	24.28		
10	Xiangkun Liu (CHN)	24.08 q	24.78		
11	Felix Rice (CUB)	24.14 q	24.64		
12	Felipe Gomes (BRA)	23.90 q	DNS		
13	Matthias Schmidt (GER)	25.10			
14	Lukas Hendry (SUI)	25.38			
15	Lex Gillette (USA)	24.42			
16	Dao van Cuong (VIE)	24.56			
17	Jose Camacho (VEN)	24.70			
18	Xiang Wu (CHN)	24.96			
	Jon Dunkerley (CAN)	DSQ			
