= Vietnam at the 2024 Summer Paralympics =

- Flag of Vietnam
- IPC code: VIE
- NPC: Vietnam Paralympic Association

in Paris, France August 28, 2024 – September 8, 2024
- Competitors: 7 (5 men and 2 women) in 3 sports
- Flag bearers: Châu Hoàng Tuyết Loan; Lê Văn Công
- Medals Ranked 79th: Gold 0 Silver 0 Bronze 1 Total 1

Summer Paralympics appearances (overview)
- 2000; 2004; 2008; 2012; 2016; 2020; 2024

Vietnam competed at the 2024 Summer Paralympics in Paris, France, from 28 August to 8 September.

== Medalists ==
Medal	Name	Sport	Event	Date
Bronze	Lê Văn Công	Powerlifting	Men's −49 kg	4 September

=== Medals by sport ===
Medals by sport
Sport	1st place, gold medalist(s)	2nd place, silver medalist(s)	3rd place, bronze medalist(s)	Total
Powerlifting	0	0	1	1
Total	0	0	1	1

=== Medals by gender ===
Medals by gender
Gender	1st place, gold medalist(s)	2nd place, silver medalist(s)	3rd place, bronze medalist(s)	Total
Female	0	0	0	0
Male	0	0	1	1
Mixed	0	0	0	0
Total	0	0	1	1

=== Medals by date ===
Medals by date
Date	1st place, gold medalist(s)	2nd place, silver medalist(s)	3rd place, bronze medalist(s)	Total
4 September	0	0	1	1
Total	0	0	1	1

== Competitors ==
The following is the list of number of competitors in the Games.

Sport	Men	Women	Total
Athletics	1	0	1
Powerlifting	2	2	4
Swimming	2	0	2
Total	5	2	7

== Athletics ==
Vietnam qualified one man to compete at the games, by achieving the High Performance Standards (HPS) allocation slots.

Men

Athlete	Event	Heat		Final	
Athlete	Event	Result	Rank	Result	Rank
Phạm Nguyễn Khánh Minh	Men's 400 m T12	51.28	7	Did not advance	

== Powerlifting ==
Vietnam secured four quotas by virtue of the rankings when the qualifying period ended on 26 June 2024. Four of the lifters achieved qualification at two weights and will have to decide which of these they will compete in at the Games.

Athlete	Event	Attempts (kg)				Result (kg)	Rank
Athlete	Event	1	2	3	4	Result (kg)	Rank
Lê Văn Công	Men's −49 kg	171	~~176~~	~~181~~	—N/a	171	3rd place, bronze medalist(s)
Nguyễn Bình An	Men's −54 kg	~~168~~	NM	NM	—N/a	DNF	
Châu Hoàng Tuyết Loan	Women's −55 kg	91	96	~~99~~	—N/a	96	5
Đặng Thị Linh Phượng	Women's −50 kg	93	98	~~103~~	—N/a	98	8

== Swimming ==
Vietnam qualified two man swimmers to compete at the games, by achieving the Minimum Qualification Standard (MQS) allocation slots.

Men

Athlete	Event	Heat		Final	
Athlete	Event	Result	Rank	Result	Rank
Đỗ Thanh Hải	100 m breaststroke SB5	1:35.41	2 Q	1:35.03	4
Lê Tiến Đạt	100 m breaststroke SB5	1:36.10	3 Q	1:35.61	5

== See also ==
- Vietnam at the 2024 Summer Olympics
- Vietnam at the Paralympics
