= Powerlifting at the 2017 ASEAN Para Games =

Results international powerlifting competition 2017 Asean Para Games

- Venue: Malaysian International Trade & Exhibition Centre
- Date: 18–21 September 2017

Paralympic powerlifting at the 2017 ASEAN Para Games was held at Malaysian International Trade & Exhibition Centre (MITEC) , Kuala Lumpur.

== Medal tally ==
* Host nation (Malaysia)

| Rank | Nation | Gold | Silver | Bronze | Total |
|---|---|---|---|---|---|
| 1 | Indonesia (INA) | 7 | 4 | 0 | 11 |
| 2 | Thailand (THA) | 6 | 4 | 4 | 14 |
| 3 | Vietnam (VIE) | 4 | 4 | 2 | 10 |
| 4 | Malaysia (MAS)* | 1 | 4 | 5 | 10 |
| 5 | Philippines (PHI) | 1 | 0 | 1 | 2 |
| 6 | Laos (LAO) | 0 | 1 | 1 | 2 |
| 7 | Myanmar (MYA) | 0 | 1 | 0 | 1 |
| 8 | Timor-Leste (TLS) | 0 | 0 | 1 | 1 |
| Totals (8 entries) | | 19 | 18 | 14 | 51 |

== Medalists ==
=== Men ===
| Event | Gold | Silver | Bronze |
|---|---|---|---|
| 49 kg | Lê Văn Công; Vietnam | Pia Laophakdee; Laos | Eay Simay; Laos |
| 54 kg | Nguyễn Bình An; Vietnam | Amorntep Pongsa; Thailand | Silverio M Soares; Timor-Leste |
| 59 kg | Choochat Sukjarern; Thailand | Nguyễn Văn Phúc; Vietnam | Gustin Jenang; Malaysia |
| 65 kg | Narong Kasanun; Thailand | Nguyễn Thanh Xuân; Vietnam | Agustin Kitan; Philippines |
| 72 kg | Thongsa Marasri; Thailand | Nguyễn Văn Hùng; Vietnam | Ma Phường Quang; Vietnam |
| 80 kg | Kampa Pongtao; Thailand | Ma Hussein Mat Noh; Malaysia | none awarded |
| 88 kg | Anto Boi; Indonesia | none awarded | none awarded |
| 97 kg | Jong Yee Khie; Malaysia | Atmaji Priambodo; Indonesia | Chinnaphop Khamdam; Thailand |
| 107 kg | Prakit Tongsang; Thailand | Wan Nur Azri Wan Azman; Malaysia | Mohd Faiz Hussain; Malaysia |

=== Women ===
| Event | Gold | Silver | Bronze |
|---|---|---|---|
| 41 kg | Nur Jannah Kamsyah Kariem; Indonesia | Nurul Rabiatul Adawiyah Bakri; Malaysia | none awarded |
| 45 kg | Ni Nengah Widiasih; Indonesia | Nguyễn Thị Hồng; Vietnam | Withieera Jaitong; Thailand |
| 50 kg | Đặng Thị Linh Phượng; Vietnam | Phikul Charoenying; Thailand | none awarded |
| 55 kg | Châu Hoàng Tuyết Loan; Vietnam | Rani Puji Astuti; Indonesia | Wandi Kongmuang; Thailand |
| 61 kg | Yuliana Lili; Indonesia | Hat Motnok; Thailand | Nguyễn Thị Thanh Thủy; Vietnam |
| 67 kg | Somkhoun Anon; Thailand | Rahayu; Indonesia | Bibiana Ahmad; Malaysia |
| 73 kg | Nurtani Purba; Indonesia | Arawan Bootpo; Thailand | Sona Agon; Malaysia |
| 79 kg | Siti Mahmudah; Indonesia | Nyein Sandar Aung; Myanmar | none awarded |
| 86 kg | Ni Nengah Widiasih; Indonesia | Norfariza Mortadza; Malaysia | Rujapa Chaipidech; Thailand |
| Over 86 kg | Adeline Dumapong-Ancheta; Philippines | Sriyanti; Indonesia | Sharifah Raudzah Syed Akil; Malaysia |

== See also ==
- Weightlifting at the 2017 Southeast Asian Games
