= Powerlifting at the 2020 Summer Paralympics – Women's 55 kg =

Powerlifting – Women's 55 kg at the XVI Paralympic Games
- Venue: Tokyo International Forum
- Date: 27 August 2021
- Competitors: 9 from 9 nations

Medalists
| 1st place, gold medalist(s) | | Mariana Shevchuk | Ukraine |
| 2nd place, silver medalist(s) | | Xiao Cuijuan | China |
| 3rd place, bronze medalist(s) | | Besra Duman | Turkey |

The women's 55 kg powerlifting event at the 2020 Summer Paralympics was contested on 27 August at Tokyo International Forum.

== Records ==
There are twenty powerlifting events, corresponding to ten weight classes each for men and women. Prior to this competition, the existing world and Paralympic records were as follows.

| World Record | Mariana Shevchuk (UKR) | 133.0 kg | Tbilisi, Georgia | 20 May 2021 |
| Paralympic Record | Amalia Pérez (MEX) | 130.0 kg | Rio de Janeiro, Brazil | 10 September 2016 |

== Results ==
| Rank | Name | Body weight (kg) | Attempts (kg) | | | | Result (kg) |
| Rank | Name | Body weight (kg) | 1 | 2 | 3 | 4 | Result (kg) |
|---|---|---|---|---|---|---|---|
| 1st place, gold medalist(s) | Mariana Shevchuk (UKR) | 53.44 | 125 | ~~128~~ | ~~133~~ | – | 125 |
| 2nd place, silver medalist(s) | Xiao Cuijuan (CHN) | 54.00 | 118 | 124 | ~~126~~ | – | 124 |
| 3rd place, bronze medalist(s) | Besra Duman (TUR) | 54.84 | 117 | 124 | ~~126~~ | – | 124 |
| 4 | Camila Campos (CHI) | 54.57 | 111 | 115 | ~~117~~ | – | 115 |
| 5 | Najat El Garraa (MAR) | 54.04 | ~~108~~ | 108 | 111 | – | 111 |
| 6 | Châu Hoàng Tuyết Loan (VIE) | 53.19 | ~~95~~ | 97 | 103 | – | 103 |
| 7 | Gihan Abdelaziz (EGY) | 53.54 | 96 | ~~100~~ | 100 | – | 100 |
| 8 | Wiunawis Hernández (VEN) | 53.66 | 93 | ~~96~~ | 97 | – | 97 |
| 9 | Mozah Alzeyoudi (UAE) | 52.72 | 76 | 80 | 84 | | 80 |
