= Angola at the Paralympics =

- IPC code: ANG
- NPC: Comité Paralímpico Angolano
- Medals: Gold 4 Silver 3 Bronze 1 Total 8

Summer appearances
- 1996; 2000; 2004; 2008; 2012; 2016; 2020; 2024

Angola first competed at the Summer Paralympic Games in 1996, and has competed in every edition of the Summer Paralympics since then. The country has never participated in the Winter Paralympic Games.

All Angolan Paralympians have competed in track and field.

Angola's first Paralympic medals came in 2004, when Jose Armando Sayovo took three gold medals in the men's 100m, 200m and 400m sprints in the T11 disability category. Armando competed again at the 2008 Summer Paralympics, and won his country's only medals of the Games - three silvers.

Angola took part in the 2012 Summer Paralympics, and the Comité Paralímpico Angolano chose Bedford as the UK base for its Paralympians.

== Medals ==
=== Medals by Summer Games ===
Games	Athletes	Gold	Silver	Bronze	Total	Rank
1996 Atlanta	2	0	0	0	0	-
2000 Sydney	1	0	0	0	0	-
2004 Athens	4	3	0	0	3	39
2008 Beijing	5	0	3	0	3	54
2012 London	4	1	0	1	2	51
2016 Rio de Janeiro	4	0	0	0	0	-
2020 Tokyo	2	0	0	0	0	-
2024 Paris	2	0	0	0	0	-
2028 Los Angeles	Future Event					
2032 Brisbane	Future Event					
Total		4	3	1	8	

=== Medals by Summer Sport ===
Games	Gold	Silver	Bronze	Total
Athletics	4	3	1	8
Total	4	3	1	8

== List of medalists ==
Medal	Name	Games	Sport	Event
Gold	Jose Armando Sayovo	(Greece) 2004 Athens	Athletics	100m T11
Gold	Jose Armando Sayovo	(Greece) 2004 Athens	Athletics	200m T11
Gold	Jose Armando Sayovo	(Greece) 2004 Athens	Athletics	400m T11
Silver	Jose Armando Sayovo	(China) 2008 Beijing	Athletics	100m T11
Silver	Jose Armando Sayovo	(China) 2008 Beijing	Athletics	200m T11
Silver	Jose Armando Sayovo	(China) 2008 Beijing	Athletics	400m T11
Gold	Jose Armando Sayovo	(United Kingdom) 2012 London	Athletics	400m T11
Bronze	Jose Armando Sayovo	(United Kingdom) 2012 London	Athletics	200m T11
