= Powerlifting at the 2004 Summer Paralympics – Women's 44 kg =

Women's Up To 44 kg at the XII Paralympic Games
- Paralympic Powerlifting
- Venue: Nikaia Olympic Weightlifting Hall
- Dates: 20 September 2004
- Competitors: 8 from 8 nations
- Winning weight(kg): 127.5

Medalists
1st place, gold medalist(s)		Lucy Ejike	Nigeria
2nd place, silver medalist(s)		Gihan El Aziz Baioumy	Egypt
3rd place, bronze medalist(s)		Xiao Cuijuan	China

The Women's 44 kg powerlifting event at the 2004 Summer Paralympics was competed on 20 September. It was won by Lucy Ejike, representing Nigeria.

== Final round ==
20 Sept. 2004, 17:15

Rank	Athlete	Weight(kg)	Notes
1st place, gold medalist(s)	Lucy Ejike (NGR)	127.5	WR
2nd place, silver medalist(s)	Gihan El Aziz Baioumy (EGY)	95.0	
3rd place, bronze medalist(s)	Xiao Cuijuan (CHN)	87.5	
4	Tamara Kulynych (UKR)	82.5	
5	Thi Hong Nguyen (VIE)	75.0	
6	Miriam Aguilar (MEX)	70.0	
7	Anna Marczuk (POL)	62.5	
8	Shin Jung Hee (KOR)	60.0	
