= Athletics at the 2012 Summer Paralympics – Men's 400 metres T11 =

Men's 400 metres T11 at the XIV Paralympic Games
- Venue: London Olympic Stadium
- Dates: 6 and 7 September
- Competitors: 12 from 8 nations
- Winning time: 50.75

Medalists
1st place, gold medalist(s)		Jose Sayovo Armando; Nicolau Palanca	Angola
2nd place, silver medalist(s)		Lucas Prado; Laercio Alves Martins	Brazil
3rd place, bronze medalist(s)		Gauthier Tresor Makunda; Antoine Laneyrie	France

Athletics at the 2012 Summer Paralympics
Classification
T/F11–13: Blind and visually impaired
T/F20: Intellectual disability
T/F31–38: Cerebral palsy
F40: Les Autres
T/F42–46: Amputees
T/F51–58: Spinal cord disability
Men T/F11–13
Track
100 m	T11	T12	T13
200 m	T11	T12	T13
400 m	T11	T12	T13
800 m		T12	T13
1500 m	T11		T13
5000 m	T11	T12
4×100 m relay	T11–13
Road
Marathon		T12
Field
Long jump	F11		F13
Triple jump	F11	F12
Shot put	F11–12
Discus throw	F11
Javelin throw		F12–13
Women T/F11–13
Track
100 m	T11	T12	T13
200 m	T11	T12
400 m		T12	T13
1500 m		T12
Field
Long jump	F11–12		F13
Shot put	F11–12
Discus throw	F11–12
Javelin throw		F12–13

The Men's 400 metres T11 event at the 2012 Summer Paralympics took place at the London Olympic Stadium on 6 and 7 September.

The T11 category is for athletes with a visual impairment. A T11 athlete may be entirely without sight, or be able to perceive light, but have no ability to see the shape of a hand at any distance. T11 athletes commonly run with guides.

== Records ==
Prior to the competition, the existing World and Paralympic records were as follows:

World & Paralympic record	Jose Armando (ANG)	50.03	25 September 2004	Athens, Greece

== Results ==
=== Round 1 ===
Competed 6 September 2012 from 21:44. Qual. rule: winner of each heat (Q) plus best second place (q) qualified.

==== Heat 1 ====
Rank	Athlete	Country	Time	Notes
1	Jose Sayovo Armando; Guide: Nicolau Palanca	Angola	52.04	Q, PB
2	Gauthier Tresor Makunda; Guide: Antoine Laneyrie	France	52.08	q, PB
3	Oscar David Herrera; Guide: Richard Torrealba	Venezuela	56.55	SB
4	Carlos J Barto Silva; Guide: Cassio Henrique Damiao	Brazil	56.83	SB

==== Heat 2 ====
Rank	Athlete	Country	Time	Notes
1	Daniel Silva; Guide: Leonardo Souza Lopes	Brazil	51.41	Q, SB
2	Arian Iznaga; Guide: Yaseen Perez Gomez	Cuba	53.95	SB
3	Octavio Angelo Dos Santos; Guide: Abel Pires Maquina Mariti	Angola	55.09	SB
4	Dustin Riley Walsh; Guide: Dylan Williamson	Canada	DQ	

==== Heat 3 ====
Rank	Athlete	Country	Time	Notes
1	Lucas Prado; Guide: Laercio Alves Martins	Brazil	52.00	Q, SB
2	Ananias Shikongo; Guide: Even Tjiviju	Namibia	52.45	PB
3	Jonathan Peter Dunkerley; Guide: Sean Young	Canada	55.27	
4	Pita Rondao Bulande; Guide: Fernando Lucas Macungo	Mozambique	57.51	SB

=== Final ===
Competed 7 September 2012 at 21:17.

Rank	Athlete	Country	Time	Notes
1st place, gold medalist(s)	Jose Sayovo Armando; Guide: Nicolau Palanca	Angola	50.75	PB
2nd place, silver medalist(s)	Lucas Prado; Guide: Laercio Alves Martins	Brazil	51.44	SB
3rd place, bronze medalist(s)	Gauthier Tresor Makunda; Guide: Antoine Laneyrie	France	52.45	
	Daniel Silva; Guide: Leonardo Souza Lopes	Brazil	DNS	

Q = qualified by place. q = qualified by time. PB = Personal Best. DNS = Did not start.
