= Vietnam at the 2008 Summer Paralympics =

- IPC code: VIE
- NPC: Vietnam Paralympic Association

in Beijing
- Competitors: 9 in 4 sports
- Flag bearer: Nguyen Quang Vuong
- Medals: Gold 0 Silver 0 Bronze 0 Total 0

Summer Paralympics appearances (overview)
- 2000; 2004; 2008; 2012; 2016; 2020; 2024

Vietnam competed at the 2008 Summer Paralympics in Beijing. The country was represented by nine athletes, competing in powerlifting, athletics, swimming and judo. Two of the athletes, powerlifters Dinh Thi Nga and Le Van Cong, qualified for the Paralympics through their showings at international competitions, while the other seven team members were given wild card invitations. The head of the delegation was Vu The Phiet. The group left for Beijing following a departure ceremony on August 22 in Hanoi.

== Sports ==
=== Athletics ===
==== Men ====
| Athlete | Class | Event | Heat | | Semifinal | | Final | |
| Athlete | Class | Event | Result | Rank | Result | Rank | Result | Rank |
|---|---|---|---|---|---|---|---|---|
| Dao Van Cuong | T11 | 100m | 12.14 | 20 | Did not advance | | | |
| Dao Van Cuong | T11 | 200m | 24.56 | 16 | Did not advance | | | |
| Dao Van Cuong | T11 | 400m | 54.38 | 7 q | 54.36 | 8 | Did not advance | |

==== Women ====
| Athlete | Class | Event | Heat | | Final | |
| Athlete | Class | Event | Result | Rank | Result | Rank |
|---|---|---|---|---|---|---|
| Nguyen Thi Hai | F57-58 | Discus throw | — | | 28.04 | 9 |
| Nguyen Thi Hai | F57-58 | Javelin throw | — | | 25.60 | 7 |
| Nguyen Thi Hai | F57-58 | Shot put | — | | 7.60 | 12 |
| Nguyen Thi Thanh Thao | T53 | 100m | 19.80 | 12 | Did not advance | |
| Nguyen Thi Thanh Thao | T53 | 200m | 36.92 | 13 | Did not advance | |
| Nguyen Thi Thanh Thao | T53 | 400m | 1:08.75 | 10 | Did not advance | |

=== Judo ===
| Athlete | Event | First round | Semifinals | Repechage | Final/ Bronze medal contest |
| Athlete | Event | Opposition Result | Opposition Result | Opposition Result | Opposition Result |
|---|---|---|---|---|---|
| Thi Nhoi Trieu | Women's 52kg | Aurieres-Martinet (FRA); L 0000–1000 | — | S Hernandez (ESP); L 0000-0200 | Did not advance |

=== Powerlifting ===
==== Men ====
| Athlete | Event | Result | Rank |
|---|---|---|---|
| Van Cong Le | 48kg | NMR | |

==== Women ====
| Athlete | Event | Result | Rank |
|---|---|---|---|
| Hoang Tuyet Loan Chau | 48kg | 100.0 | 4 |
| Thi Nga Dinh | 52kg | 92.5 | 4 |

=== Swimming ===
| Athlete | Events | Heat | | Final | |
| Athlete | Events | Time | Rank | Time | Rank |
|---|---|---|---|---|---|
| Nguyen Quang Vuong | 100m breaststroke SB8 | 1:23.46 | 11 | Did not advance | |

== See also ==
- 2008 Summer Paralympics
- Vietnam at the Paralympics
- Vietnam at the 2008 Summer Olympics
