= Athletics at the 2008 Summer Paralympics – Men's 100 metres T11 =

2008 sporting event

The Men's 100m T11 had its first round held on September 8, beginning at 17:32. The Semifinals were held on September 9, at 12:38 and the A and B Finals were held on the same day at 17:30.

== Medalists ==
Gold	Lucas Prado; Brazil
Silver	Jose Armando; Angola
Bronze	Tresor Makunda; France

== Results ==
Place	Athlete	Round 1	Semifinals	Final B	Final A
1	Lucas Prado (BRA)	11.19 Q WR	11.20 Q	—	11.03 WR
2	Jose Armando (ANG)	11.23 q	11.40 Q	—	11.35
3	Tresor Makunda (FRA)	11.48 Q	11.51 Q	—	11.46
4	Xiangkun Liu (CHN)	11.52 Q	11.46 Q	—	11.57
5	Daniel Silva (BRA)	11.52 q	11.55 q	11.56	
6	Olusegun Francis Rotawo (NGR)	11.58 Q	11.51 q	11.60	
7	Octavio dos Santos (ANG)	11.49 Q	11.60 q	11.64	
8	Felipe Gomes (BRA)	11.55 q	11.57 q	11.72	
9	Felix Rice (CUB)	11.49 q	11.65		
10	Fernando Ferrer (VEN)	11.59 q	11.67		
11	Firmino Baptista (POR)	11.78 Q	11.73		
12	Oleksandr Ivaniukhin (UKR)	11.76 Q	11.76		
13	Carlos Lopes (POR)	11.82			
14	Lex Gillette (USA)	11.85			
14	Miguel Francisco (ANG)	11.85			
16	Xiang Wu (CHN)	11.88			
17	Javier Porras (ESP)	12.00			
18	Jose Camacho (VEN)	12.02			
19	Jon Dunkerley (CAN)	12.12			
20	Dao van Cuong (VIE)	12.14			
21	Koichi Takada (JPN)	12.16			
22	Jakkrit Punthong (THA)	12.23			
23	Lukas Hendry (SUI)	12.39			
24	Luis Hernandez (HON)	13.06			
25	Alfonso Olivero Encarnacion (DOM)	13.17			
	Nelacey Porter (USA)	DSQ			
	Andrey Koptev (RUS)	DSQ			
