= Athletics at the 2015 Parapan American Games – Men's 200 metres T11 =

Athletics – Men's 200 metres T11 at the 2015 Parapan American Games
- Venue: CIBC Athletics Stadium
- Dates: August 12–13
- Competitors: 12 from 8 nations

Medalists
1st place, gold medalist(s)		David Brown (Guide: Jerome Avery)	United States
2nd place, silver medalist(s)		Felipe de Souza Gomes (Guide: Jorges Pereira Borges)	Brazil
3rd place, bronze medalist(s)		Daniel Mendes da Silva (Guide: Heitor de Oliveira Sales)	Brazil

The men's T11 200 metres competition of the athletics events at the 2015 Parapan American Games was held between August 12 and 13 at the CIBC Athletics Stadium. The defending Parapan American Games champion was Lucas Prado of Brazil.

== Records ==
Prior to this competition, the existing records were as follows:

World record	David Brown (USA)	22.41	Walnut, California, United States of America	18 April 2014
Americas record	David Brown (USA)	22.41	Walnut, California, United States of America	18 April 2014
Parapan Am Record	Lucas Prado (BRA)	22.85	Guadalajara, Mexico	16 November 2011

=== Records Broken ===
Parapan Am Record	David Brown (USA)	22.74	Toronto, Canada	13 August 2015

== Schedule ==
All times are Central Standard Time (UTC-6).

Date	Time	Round
12 August	20:33	Semifinal 1
12 August	20:37	Semifinal 2
12 August	20:41	Semifinal 3
13 August	17:54	Final

== Results ==
All times are shown in seconds.

KEY:	q	Fastest non-qualifiers	Q	Qualified	PR	Parapan American Games record	AR	Area record	NR	National record	PB	Personal best	SB	Seasonal best	DSQ	Disqualified	FS	False start

=== Semifinals ===
The fastest from each heat and next overall fastest qualified for the final.

==== Semifinal 1 ====
Wind: +0.5 m/s

Rank	Name	Nation	Time	Notes
1	David Brown (Guide: Jerome Avery	United States	22.82	Q, PR
2	Felipe de Souza Gomes (Guide: Jorge Pereira Borges)	Brazil	23.04	q
3	Albertino Maduro (Guide: Jesus Arias de la Cruz	Aruba	29.97	
4	Jesus Diaz (Guide: Yoandri Mosquera Medina	Venezuela	DSQ	Did not start

==== Semifinal 2 ====
Wind: +2.9 m/s

Rank	Name	Nation	Time	Notes
1	Daniel Mendes da Silva (Guide: Heitor de Oliveira Sales)	Brazil	22.94	Q
2	Delfo Jose Arce Orozco (Guide: Arley Barrios)	Colombia	23.87	
3	Alberto Cretton Salas (Guide: Bruno Zanacchi)	Argentina	24.34	
4	Mauricio Chavez (Guide: Marcos Ramirez)	Mexico	25.00	

==== Semifinal 3 ====
Wind: 2.4 m/s

Rank	Name	Nation	Time	Notes
1	Lucas Prado (Guide: Justino Barbosa dos Santos)	Brazil	22.94	Q
2	Fernando Ferrer (Guide: Javier Herrera)	Venezuela	24.95	
3	Franco Bravo (Guide: Martin Sabio)	Argentina	25.77	
4	Dustin Walsh (Guide: Dylan Williamson)	Canada	DSQ	

=== Final ===
Wind: -2.0 m/s

Rank	Name	Nation	Time	Notes
1st place, gold medalist(s)	David Brown (Guide:Jerome Avery)	United States	22.74	PR
2nd place, silver medalist(s)	Felipe de Souza Gomes (Guide: Jorge Pereira Borges)	Brazil	22.92	
3rd place, bronze medalist(s)	Daniel Mendes da Silva (Guide: Heitor de Oliveira Sales)	Brazil	23.00	SB
4	Lucas Prado (Guide: Justino Barbosa dos Santos)	Brazil	23.02	SB
