= Nguyễn Thị Hồng =

Nguyễn Thị Hồng may refer to:

- Nguyễn Thị Hồng (powerlifter)
- Nguyễn Thị Hồng (economist)
