= Angola at the 2012 Summer Paralympics =

- IPC code: ANG
- NPC: Comité Paralímpico Angolano

in London
- Competitors: 4 in 1 sport
- Flag bearer: Maria Silva
- Medals Ranked 51st: Gold 1 Silver 0 Bronze 1 Total 2

Summer Paralympics appearances (overview)
- 1996; 2000; 2004; 2008; 2012; 2016; 2020; 2024

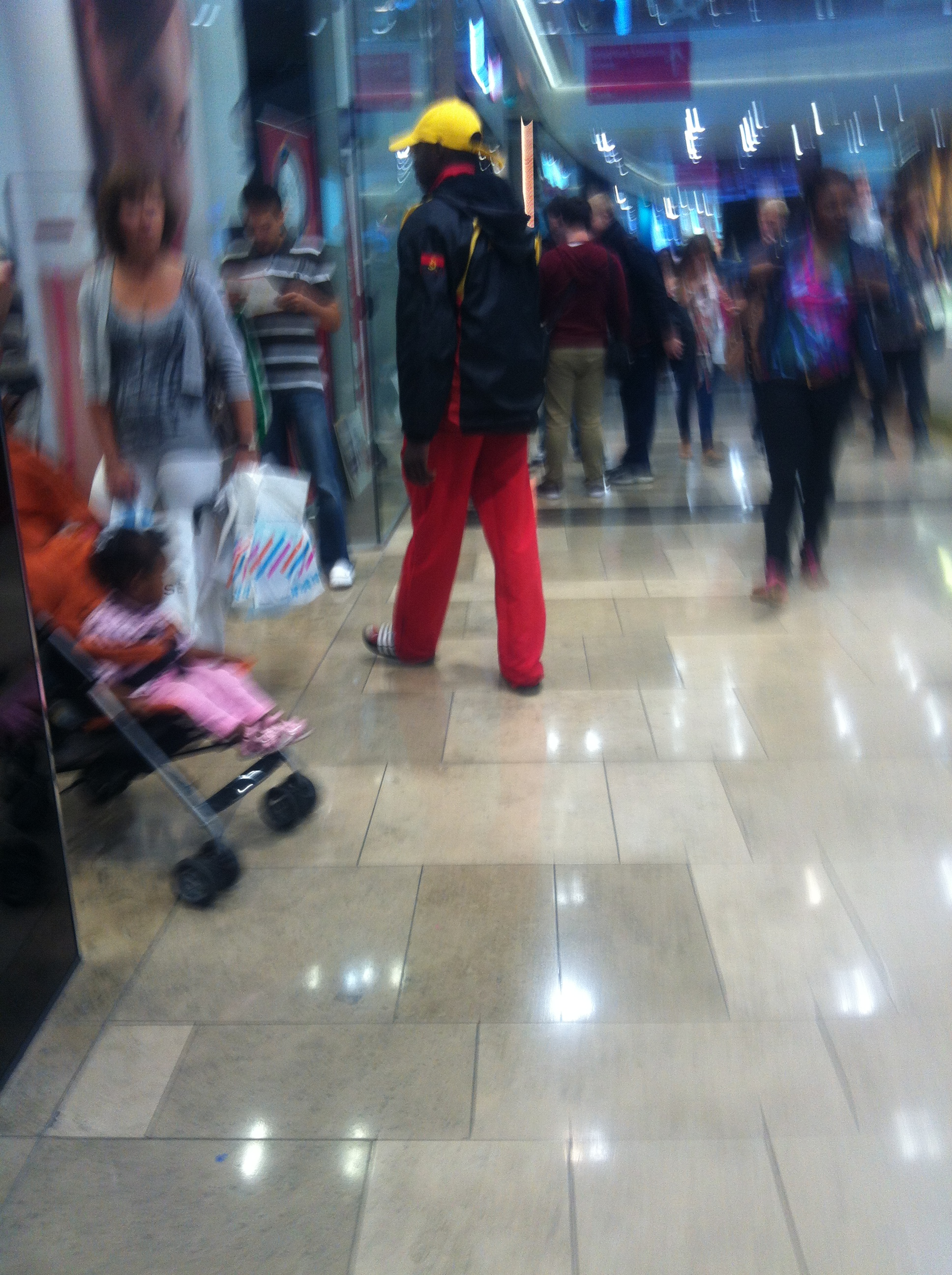
Angolan at the 2012 Summer Paralympics.

Angola competed at the 2012 Summer Paralympics in London, United Kingdom from August 29 to September 9, 2012.

== Medallists ==
Medal	Name	Sport	Event	Date
Gold	José Sayovo Armando	Athletics	Men's 400m T11	7 September
Bronze	José Sayovo Armando	Athletics	Men's 200m T11	4 September

== Athletics ==
Jose Sayovo Armando won a gold medal for Angola in the Men's 400m T11 event on September 7.

Athlete	Event	Heat		Semifinal		Final	
Athlete	Event	Result	Rank	Result	Rank	Result	Rank
José Sayovo Armando	Men's 100m T11	11.33	1 Q	11.32	1 Q	11.36	4
José Sayovo Armando	Men's 200m T11	23.07	2 q	22.84	1 Q	23.10	3rd place, bronze medalist(s)
José Sayovo Armando	Men's 400m T11	52.04	1 Q	—		50.75	1st place, gold medalist(s)
Octávio Angelo Dos Santos	Men's 100m T11	11.70	2 q	11.59	4	Did not advance	
Octávio Angelo Dos Santos	Men's 200m T11	24.31	3	did not advance			
Octávio Angelo Dos Santos	Men's 400m T11	55.09	3	—		Did not advance	
Esperança Gicaso	Women's 100m T11	12.98	2	—		Did not advance	
Esperança Gicaso	Women's 200m T11	28.45	2	Did not advance			
Esperança Gicaso	Women's 400m T12	1:07.57	3	Did not advance			
Maria Gomes Da Silva	Women's 100m T11	13.57	3	—		did not advance	
Maria Gomes Da Silva	Women's 200m T11	27.60	2 q	27.71	4	Did not advance	
Maria Gomes Da Silva	Women's 400m T12	1:01.78	2 q	1:02.20	3	Did not advance	

== See also ==
- Angola at the Paralympics
- Angola at the 2012 Summer Olympics
