= Angola at the 2000 Summer Paralympics =

- IPC code: ANG
- NPC: Comité Paralímpico Angolano

in Sydney
- Competitors: 1 in 1 sport
- Medals: Gold 0 Silver 0 Bronze 0 Total 0

Summer Paralympics appearances (overview)
- 1996; 2000; 2004; 2008; 2012; 2016; 2020; 2024

Angola competed at the 2000 Summer Paralympics in Sydney, Australia. It was the country's second participation at the Paralympic Games, as the lengthy Angolan Civil War continued. It was represented by a single athlete - André Augusto, who competed in the men's 800 metre sprint, T46 category. He did not win a medal, finishing sixth out of eight in the event's single round, in 2:00.92. (Côte d'Ivoire's Oumar Basakoulba Kone won the race in 1:58.36.)

== Team ==
Angola sent 1 participants to the Sydney Games, a man, André Augusto. It was the country's second participation at the Paralympic Games, as the lengthy Angolan Civil War continued.

== Full results ==
André Augusto competed in the men's 800 metre sprint, T46 category. He did not win a medal, finishing sixth out of eight in the event's single round, in 2:00.92. His event was won by Côte d'Ivoire's Oumar Basakoulba Kone won the race in 1:58.36.

Name	Sport	Event	Score	Rank
André Augusto	Athletics	Men's 800 m T46	2:00.92	6th

== See also ==
- Angola at the Paralympics
- Angola at the 2000 Summer Olympics
