= Angola at the 2020 Summer Paralympics =

- Flag of Angola
- IPC code: ANG
- NPC: National Paralympic Committee Angola

in Tokyo, Japan August 24, 2021 – September 5, 2021
- Competitors: 2 (1 man and 1 woman) in 1 sport
- Medals: Gold 0 Silver 0 Bronze 0 Total 0

Summer Paralympics appearances (overview)
- 1996; 2000; 2004; 2008; 2012; 2016; 2020; 2024

Angola competed at the 2020 Summer Paralympics in Tokyo, Japan, from 24 August to 5 September 2021. This was their seventh consecutive appearance at the Summer Paralympics since 1996.

== Competitors ==
The following is the list of number of competitors participating in the Games:

Sport	Men	Women	Total
Athletics	1	1	2

== Athletics ==
Men's track

Athlete	Event	Final	
Athlete	Event	Result	Rank
Manuel Ernestro Jaime	1500m T46	4:09.79	11

Women's track

Athlete	Event	Heats		Semi-final		Final	
Athlete	Event	Result	Rank	Result	Rank	Result	Rank
Juliana Ngleya Moko	100m T11	0:13.03	8	0:13.15	6	Did not advance	
Juliana Ngleya Moko	200m T11	0:27.27	8	0:27.12	8	Did not advance	
Juliana Ngleya Moko	400m T11	1:04.26	8	Did not advance			

== See also ==
- Angola at the Paralympics
- Angola at the 2020 Summer Olympics
