= Justyna Kozdryk =

Polish powerlifter (born 1980)

Personal information
- Born: 4 March 1980 (age 46) Grójec, Poland
- Height: 116 cm (3 ft 10 in)

Sport
- Country: Poland
- Sport: Paralympic powerlifting
- Disability: Achondroplasia
Medal record
Paralympic powerlifting
Representing Poland
Paralympic Games
| Silver medal – second place | 2008 Beijing | Women's -44kg |
| Bronze medal – third place | 2020 Tokyo | Women's -45kg |
World Championships
| Silver medal – second place | 2006 Busan | Women's -44kg |
| Silver medal – second place | 2010 Kuala Lumpur | Women's -44kg |
| Silver medal – second place | 2014 Dubai | Women's -45kg |
European Open Championships
| Gold medal – first place | 2013 | Women's -45kg |
| Silver medal – second place | 2015 | Women's -45kg |
| Silver medal – second place | 2018 | Women's -45kg |

Justyna Kozdryk (born 4 March 1980) is a Polish powerlifter who won silver at the 2008 Summer Paralympics.
