= Vietnam at the 2000 Summer Paralympics =

- IPC code: VIE
- NPC: Vietnam Paralympic Association

in Sydney
- Competitors: 2
- Medals: Gold 0 Silver 0 Bronze 0 Total 0

Summer Paralympics appearances (overview)
- 2000; 2004; 2008; 2012; 2016; 2020; 2024

Vietnam competed at the 2000 Summer Paralympics in Sydney, Australia. The country was represented by two competitors and did not win any medals.

== See also ==
- Vietnam at the 2000 Summer Olympics
