= Besra Duman =

Turkish Paralympic powerlifter (born 2001)

Personal information
- Born: 10 January 2001 (age 25) Özalp, Van, Turkey

Sport
- Country: Turkey
- Sport: Paralympic powerlifting
- Club: Konya Meram Belediyesi SK
- Coached by: Arif Kıran
Medal record
Paralympic Games
Bronze medal – third place	2020 Tokyo	55 kg
Silver medal – second place	2024 Paris	55 kg
World Championships
Silver medal – second place	2021 Tbilisi	55 kg
Bronze medal – third place	2017 Mexico City	50 kg
World Cup
Gold medal – first place	2024 Sharm El Sheikh	55 kg Total
Silver medal – second place	2024 Sharm El Sheikh	55 kg Individual
Bronze medal – third place	2024 Dubai	55 kg
Silver medal – second place	2021 Dubai	55 kg
Gold medal – first place	2021 Bogotá	55 kg
Gold medal – first place	2021 Pattaya	55 kg
European Championships
Bronze medal – third place	2018 Berck	55 kg Open
Silver medal – second place	2018 Berck	55 kg Regional
Gold medal – first place	2018 Berck	55 kg J Open
Gold medal – first place	2018 Berck	55 kg J Regional

Besra Duman (born 10 January 2001) is a Turkish Paralympian para powerlifter who competes in the 55 kg division. She won the silver medal at the 2024 Paris Paralympic Games.

== Sport career ==
Duman started performing para powerling in 2012 with the encouragement of the weightlifting coach Emin Görmüş, despite her mother's prejudice saying she can not do it. She is a member of the Konya Meram Belediyesi Sport Club, where she is coached by Arif Kıran.

=== 2017 ===
She took the bronze medal lifting 117 kg in the 50 kg event at the 2017 World Para Powerlifting Championships in Mexico Cşty, Mexico.

=== 2018 ===
At the 2018 European Open Championships in Berck, France, she competed in the 55 kg, and captured gold medals in the Juniors Open and Juniors Regipnal categories, as well as the bronze medal in the Women's Open and the silver medal in the Women's Regional categories.

=== 2019 ===
She competed at the 2019 World Para Powerlifting Championships in Nur Sultan, Kazakhstan, and ranked fourth lifting 110 kg.

=== 2021 ===
She claimed the gold medal in the 55 kg event lifting 117 kg at the Bogotá, Colombia meeting of the 2021 World Para Powerlifting World Cup. She won another gold medal with her lifting of 123 kg at the Pattaya, Thailand meeting of the World Cup. In the Dubai, United Arab Emirates meeting of the World Para Powerlifting - 2021 World Cup, she lifted 123 kg and took the silver medal.

She won the bronze medal in the women's 55 kg at the delayed 2020 Summer Paralympics held in Tokyo, Japan. A few months later, she won the silver medal with 121 kg in the 55 kg event at the 2021 World Para Powerlifting Championships held in Tbilisi, Georgia.

=== 2024 ===
At the Dubai, United Arab Emirates meeting of the World Para Powerlifting - 2024 World Cup, she lifted 120 kg in the 55 kg event, and took the bronz medal. She won the gold medal in the Total lifting 110, 113 and 115 kg, as well as the silver medal in the Individual eveny with 115 kg in the Sharm El Sheikh, Egypt meeting of 2024 World Cup.

Duman secured a spot at the 2024 Paris Paralympic Gamnes wşth her success at the latest World Cup. She won the silver medallifting 113 kg at the 2024 Summer Paralympics in Paris, France.

== Personal life ==
Besra Duman was born in Özalp district of Van, eastern Turkey on 10 January 2001. She has congenital short stature disorder.
