= Swimming at the 2016 Summer Paralympics – Men's 50 metre backstroke S5 =

Men's 50 metre backstroke S5 at the XV Paralympic Games
- Venue: Olympic Aquatics Stadium
- Dates: 16 September 2016
- Competitors: 10 from 9 nations

Medalists
1st place, gold medalist(s)		Daniel Dias	Brazil
2nd place, silver medalist(s)		Andrew Mullen	Great Britain
3rd place, bronze medalist(s)		Zsolt Vereczkei	Hungary

The Men's 50 metre backstroke S5 event at the 2016 Paralympic Games took place on 16 September 2016, at the Olympic Aquatics Stadium. Two heats were held. The swimmers with the eight fastest times advanced to the final.

== Heats ==
=== Heat 1 ===
11:16 16 September 2016:

Rank	Lane	Name	Nationality	Time	Notes
1	4	Andrew Mullen	Great Britain	37.77	Q
2	5	Beytullah Eroglu	Turkey	40.57	Q
3	6	Cameron Leslie	New Zealand	41.30	Q
4	3	Jonas Larsen	Denmark	44.18	
5	2	Thanh Trung Nguyen	Vietnam	45.91	

=== Heat 2 ===
11:20 16 September 2016:

Rank	Lane	Name	Nationality	Time	Notes
1	4	Daniel Dias	Brazil	36.46	Q
2	5	Thanh Tung Vo	Vietnam	39.62	Q
3	3	Zsolt Vereczkei	Hungary	40.23	Q
4	6	Diego Lopez Diaz	Mexico	40.73	Q
5	2	Andrea Massussi	Italy	43.82	Q

== Final ==
19:51 16 September 2016:

Rank	Lane	Name	Nationality	Time	Notes
1st place, gold medalist(s)	4	Daniel Dias	Brazil	35.40	
2nd place, silver medalist(s)	5	Andrew Mullen	Great Britain	37.94	
3rd place, bronze medalist(s)	6	Zsolt Vereczkei	Hungary	38.92	
4	3	Thanh Tung Vo	Vietnam	40.13	
5	7	Diego Lopez Diaz	Mexico	40.26	
6	2	Beytullah Eroglu	Turkey	41.31	
7	8	Andrea Massussi	Italy	42.22	
8	1	Cameron Leslie	New Zealand	42.26	
