= Powerlifting at the 2008 Summer Paralympics – Women's 44 kg =

Powerlifting - Women's 44 kg at the XIII Paralympic Games
- Venue: Beihang University Gymnasium
- Date: 9 September 2008
- Competitors: 8 from 8 nations

Medalists
1st place, gold medalist(s)		Xiao Cuijuan	China
2nd place, silver medalist(s)		Justyna Kozdryk	Poland
3rd place, bronze medalist(s)		Zeinab Sayed Oteify	Egypt

The women's 44 kg powerlifting event at the 2008 Summer Paralympics was contested on 9 September at the Beihang University Gymnasium in Beijing, China. This event was the second-lightest of the women's powerlifting weight classes, limiting competitors to a maximum of 44 kilograms (97.0 lb) of body mass.

As with all Paralympic powerlifting events, lifters competed in the bench press. Each athlete was allowed three attempts to bench press as much weight as possible. Athletes attempting to break a record were allowed a fourth attempt. For the attempt to be valid, the competitor must have lowered the weighted bar to her chest, held it motionless for a moment, then pressed the bar upwards until her arms were fully extended. If the competitor failed to meet these requirements or any other rule infraction was committed, the attempt was declared invalid by a team of three referees and the result struck from the record.

== Results ==
Rank	Name	Body weight (kg)	Attempts (kg)				Result (kg)
Rank	Name	Body weight (kg)	1	2	3	4	Result (kg)
1st place, gold medalist(s)	Xiao Cuijuan (CHN)	43.73	95.0	100.0	~~102.5~~	–	100.0
2nd place, silver medalist(s)	Justyna Kozdryk (POL)	42.41	90.0	92.5	~~95.0~~	–	92.5
3rd place, bronze medalist(s)	Zeinab Sayed Oteify (EGY)	42.76	87.5	92.5	~~95.0~~	–	92.5
4	Rayisa Toporkova (UKR)	43.35	80.0	85.0	~~95.0~~	–	85.0
5	Maria Oliveira (BRA)	42.18	~~75.0~~	75.0	82.5	–	82.5
6	Phikul Chareonying (THA)	43.44	75.0	~~80.0~~	~~80.0~~	–	75.0
–	Nairobys Hernandez (VEN)	43.26	~~85.0~~	~~85.0~~	~~85.0~~	–	NMR
–	Nephtalie Jean Louis (HAI)	–	–	–	–	–	DNS

Key: NMR=No marks recorded; DNS=Did not start
