= Swimming at the 2016 Summer Paralympics – Men's 50 metre butterfly S5 =

Men's 50 metre butterfly S5 at the XV Paralympic Games
- Venue: Olympic Aquatics Stadium
- Dates: 10 September 2016
- Competitors: 15 from 15 nations

Medalists
1st place, gold medalist(s)		Roy Perkins	United States
2nd place, silver medalist(s)		Shiwei He	China
3rd place, bronze medalist(s)		Daniel Dias	Brazil

The Men's 50 metre butterfly S5 event at the 2016 Paralympic Games took place on 10 September 2016, at the Olympic Aquatics Stadium. Two heats were held. The swimmers with the eight fastest times advanced to the final.

== Heats ==
=== Heat 1 ===
10:03 10 September 2016:

Rank	Lane	Name	Nationality	Time	Notes
1	4	Roy Perkins	United States	35.75	Q
2	5	Edgar Hugo Pineda Castro	Mexico	39.20	Q
3	7	Darko Duric	Slovenia	40.99	Q
4	2	Hani Abdelsalam	Egypt	41.57	
5	3	Jamery Siga	Malaysia	42.87	
6	6	Antonios Tsapatakis	Greece	44.55	
7	1	Andrea Massussi	Italy	48.21	

=== Heat 2 ===
10:07 10 September 2016:

Rank	Lane	Name	Nationality	Time	Notes
1	2	Shiwei He	China	35.74	Q
2	4	Daniel Dias	Brazil	36.86	Q
3	5	Andrew Mullen	Great Britain	38.19	Q
4	3	Beytullah Eroglu	Turkey	38.61	Q
5	6	Thanh Tung Vo	Vietnam	38.76	Q
6	7	Arnost Petracek	Czech Republic	41.35	
7	1	Theo Curin	France	44.13	
8	8	Danial Murphy	Canada	48.34	

== Final ==
17:56 10 September 2016:

Rank	Lane	Name	Nationality	Time	Notes
1st place, gold medalist(s)	5	Roy Perkins	United States	35.04	
2nd place, silver medalist(s)	4	Shiwei He	China	35.25	
3rd place, bronze medalist(s)	3	Daniel Dias	Brazil	35.62	
4	6	Andrew Mullen	Great Britain	36.32	
5	2	Beytullah Eroglu	Turkey	38.70	
6	1	Edgar Hugo Pineda Castro	Mexico	38.96	
7	7	Thanh Tung Vo	Vietnam	39.44	
8	8	Darko Duric	Slovenia	40.92	
