= Mariana Shevchuk =

Ukrainian Paralympic powerlifter

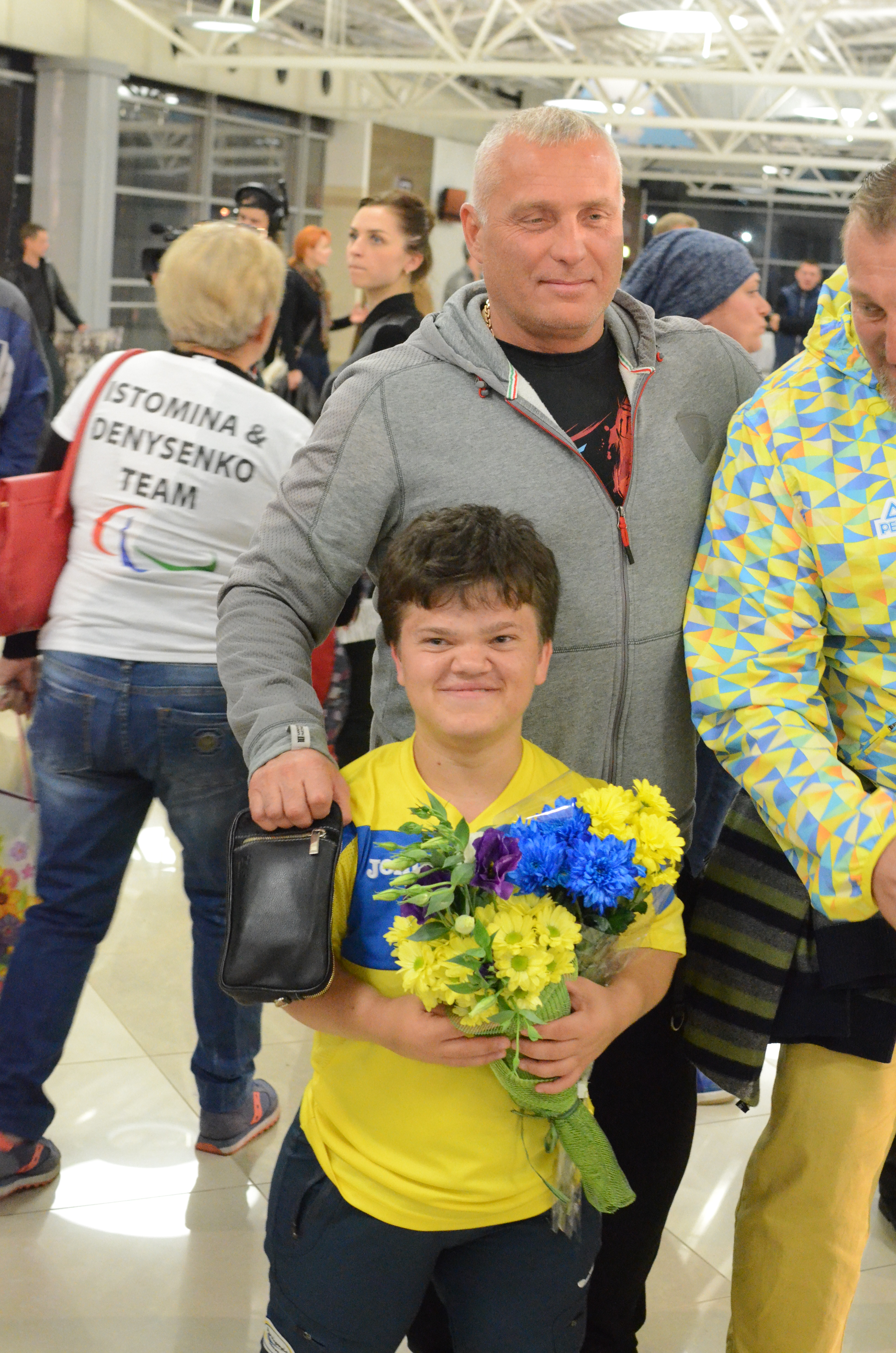

Personal information
- Born: 22 May 1996 (age 30) Khmilnyk, Ukraine

Sport
- Country: Ukraine
- Sport: Paralympic powerlifting
Medal record
Paralympic Games
Gold medal – first place	2020 Tokyo	55 kg
World Championships
Gold medal – first place	2021 Tbilisi	55 kg
Silver medal – second place	2023 Dubai	55 kg

Mariana Shevchuk (Ukrainian: Мар'яна Сергіївна Шевчук; born 22 May 1996) is a Ukrainian Paralympic powerlifter. She won the gold medal in the women's 55 kg at the 2020 Summer Paralympics held in Tokyo, Japan. A few months later, she won the gold medal in her event at the 2021 World Para Powerlifting Championships held in Tbilisi, Georgia. At this event, she also set a new world record of 133.5 kg.

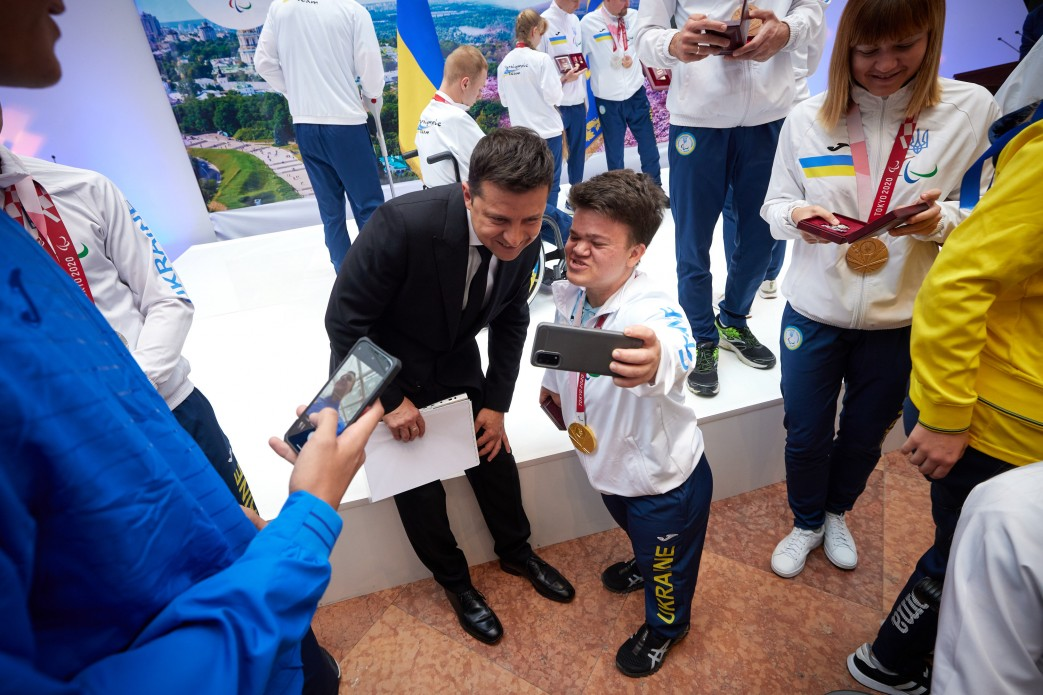
Mariana Shevchuk with President of Ukraine Volodymyr Zelenskyy in 2021
