= Angola at the 2016 Summer Paralympics =

- IPC code: ANG
- NPC: Comité Paralímpico Angolano

in Rio de Janeiro
- Competitors: 4 in 1 sports
- Flag bearer: Esperança Gicasso
- Medals: Gold 0 Silver 0 Bronze 0 Total 0

Summer Paralympics appearances (overview)
- 1996; 2000; 2004; 2008; 2012; 2016; 2020; 2024

Angola competed at the 2016 Summer Paralympics in Rio de Janeiro, Brazil, from 7 September to 18 September 2016.

== Disability classifications ==
Every participant at the Paralympics has their disability grouped into one of five disability categories; amputation, the condition may be congenital or sustained through injury or illness; cerebral palsy; wheelchair athletes, there is often overlap between this and other categories; visual impairment, including blindness; Les autres, any physical disability that does not fall strictly under one of the other categories, for example dwarfism or multiple sclerosis. Each Paralympic sport then has its own classifications, dependent upon the specific physical demands of competition. Events are given a code, made of numbers and letters, describing the type of event and classification of the athletes competing. Some sports, such as athletics, divide athletes by both the category and severity of their disabilities, other sports, for example swimming, group competitors from different categories together, the only separation being based on the severity of the disability.

== Delegation ==
The country sent a team of 4 athletes, 2 men and 2 women, along with 4 officials to the 2016 Summer Paralympics.

== Athletics ==
Men's Track

| Athlete | Events | Heat | | Semifinal | | Final | |
| Athlete | Events | Time | Rank | Time | Rank | Time | Rank |
|---|---|---|---|---|---|---|---|
| Jose Chamoleia (Guide – Nicolau Palanca) | 100 m T11 | Disqualified | | did not advance | | | |
| Jose Chamoleia (Guide – Nicolau Palanca) | 200 m T11 | 23.33 | 3 Q | 23.46 | 7 | did not advance | |
| Jose Chamoleia (Guide – Nicolau Palanca) | 400 m T11 | 53.00 | 5 | did not advance | | | |
| Octavio Santos (Guide – Luis Manuel) | 100 m T11 | 11.68 | 2 Q | 11.71 | 4 | did not advance | |
| Octavio Santos (Guide – Luis Manuel) | 200 m T11 | 24.13 | 3 | did not advance | | | |
| Octavio Santos (Guide – Luis Manuel) | 400 m T11 | 53.14 | 6 | did not advance | | | |

Women's Track

| Athlete | Events | Heat | | Semifinal | | Final | |
| Athlete | Events | Time | Rank | Time | Rank | Time | Rank |
|---|---|---|---|---|---|---|---|
| Esperanca Gicasso (Guide – Alaine Baptista) | 100 m T11 | 12.61 | 9 | did not advance | | | |
| Esperanca Gicasso (Guide – Alaine Baptista) | 200 m T11 | 26.67 | 11 Q | 26.92 | 12 | did not advance | |
| Esperanca Gicasso (Guide – Alaine Baptista) | 400 m T11 | 1:04.17 | 9 | Did not qualify | | | |
| Befilia Buya (Guide – Eduardo Chimboto) | 400 m T11 | Did not start | | | | | |
| Befilia Buya (Guide – Eduardo Chimboto) | 1500 m T11 | 5:24.01 | 8 | Did not qualify | | | |

== See also ==
- Angola at the 2016 Summer Olympics
