= Xiao Cuijuan =

Chinese Paralympic powerlifter

Personal information
- Nationality: Chinese
- Born: 19 April 1986 (age 40) Fuzhou, China

Sport
- Sport: powerlifting
Medal record
Powerlifting
Representing China
Summer Paralympics
Gold medal – first place	2008 Beijing	44 kg
Silver medal – second place	2020 Tokyo	55 kg
Bronze medal – third place	2016 Rio de Janeiro	55 kg
Bronze medal – third place	2012 London	52 kg
Bronze medal – third place	2004 Athens	44 kg
Asian Para Games
Silver medal – second place	2010 Guangzhou	48 kg

Xiao Cuijuan (born 19 April 1986 in Fuzhou) is a Chinese powerlifter. She won the bronze medal at the women's 55 kg event at the 2016 Summer Paralympics, with 115 kilograms. She won the silver medal in the same event at the 2020 Summer Paralympics in Tokyo.

She won the bronze medal in the women's 52 kg event in 2012, the gold medal in the women's 44 kg event in 2008 and the bronze medal in the same event in 2004.
