= Vietnam Paralympic Association =

National Paralympic Committee of Vietnam

National Paralympic Committee of Vietnam

National Paralympic Committee
- Country: Vietnam
- Code: VIE
- Created: 1995
- Continental association: APC
- President: Huỳnh Vĩnh Ái
- Website: www.paralympic.org/vietnam

The Vietnam Paralympic Association is the National Paralympic Committee for Vietnam. It was founded in 1995 and its president is Huỳnh Vĩnh Ái. The committee is responsible for the participation of Vietnam in the Paralympic Games, of which they have competed in every one since 2000.

== See also ==
- Vietnam at the Paralympics
- Vietnam Olympic Committee
