= David Brown (parathlete) =

American sprinter (born 1992)

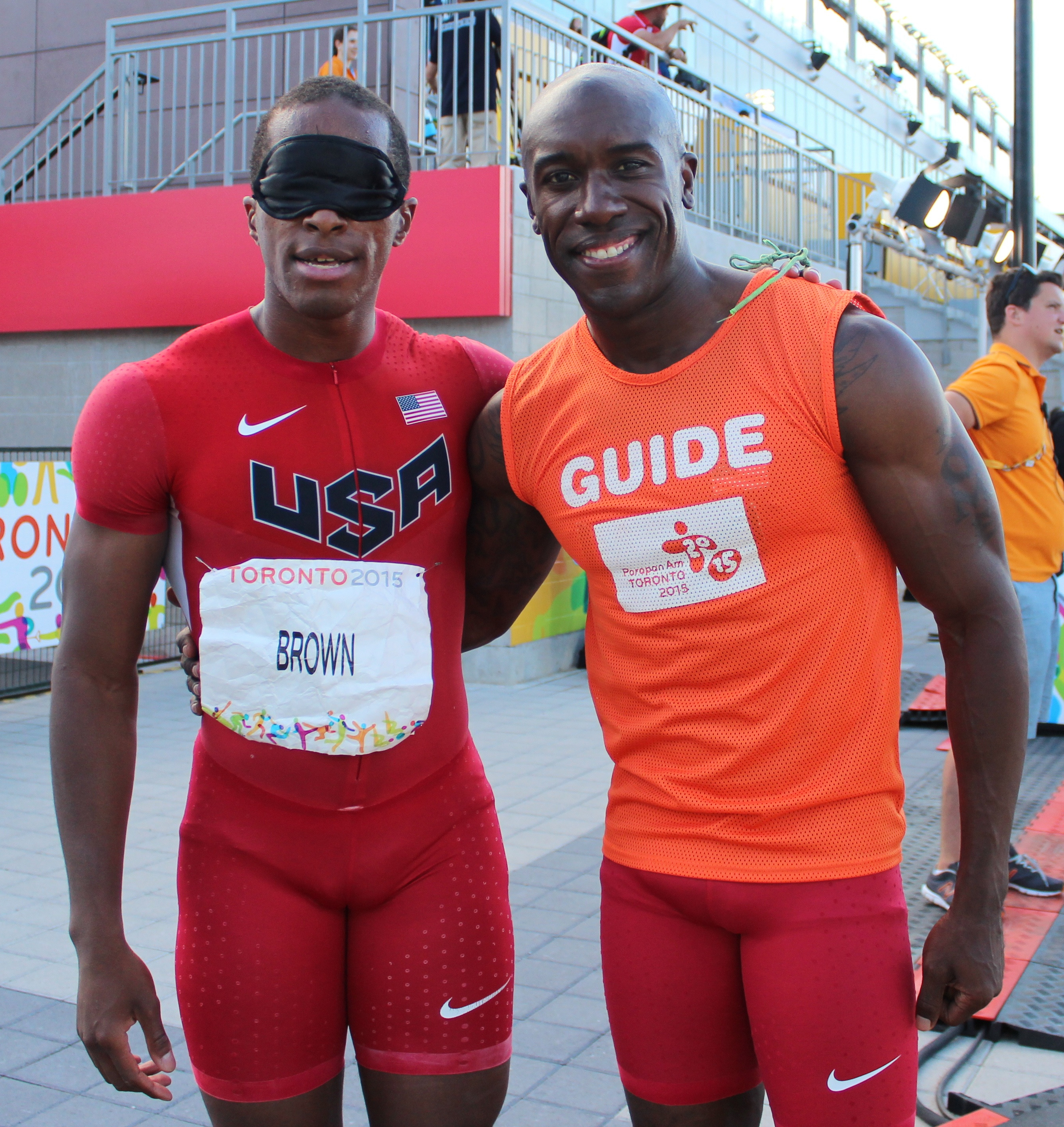
- Brown and Avery at the 2015 Parapan American Games

Personal information
- Born: October 19, 1992 (age 34) Kansas City, Missouri, U.S.
- Height: 5 ft 9 in (1.75 m)
- Weight: 168 lb (76 kg)

Sport
- Sport: Paralympic athletics
- Disability class: T11
- Event: Sprint
- Coached by: Joaquim Cruz

Achievements and titles
- Personal bests: 100 m: 10.92 (2014); 200 m: 22.41 WR (2014)
Medal record
Representing the United States
Paralympic Games
Gold medal – first place	2016 Rio de Janeiro	100 m T11
IPC Athletics World Championships
Gold medal – first place	2015 Doha	100 m T11
Gold medal – first place	2017 London	100m T11
Silver medal – second place	2013 Lyon	400 m T11
Silver medal – second place	2013 Lyon	4×100 m T11-13
Parapan American Games
Gold medal – first place	2015 Toronto	100 m T11
Gold medal – first place	2015 Toronto	200 m T11
Bronze medal – third place	2019 Lima	100m T11

David Brown (born October 19, 1992) is a visually impaired American sprint runner. He competed over 100–400 m distances at the 2012 and 2016 Paralympics and 2013 and 2015 world championships and won the 100 m event in 2015 and 2016. He currently holds the world record in the 200 m run for the T11 class and previously held world and Paralympic records for the 100 m run (T11), being the first totally blind athlete to run within 11 seconds.

== Biography ==
He was born in Kansas City, Missouri, to Francine Brown, and has an elder sister named Breana. At the age of 15 months, he was diagnosed with Kawasaki disease, which led to glaucoma and complete blindness by the age of 13. Consequently, Brown moved from Kansas City to St. Louis to attend the Missouri School for the Blind at 11. While at the Missouri School for the Blind, Brown met his first running coach, Tim Cobb, who helped him join the United States Association of Blind Athletes.

Brown practiced multiple sports, including basketball, wrestling, volleyball and goalball before turning to athletics.

Brown began competing in abled athletics in 2006 during the Colorado Rocky Mountain State Games, competing in high jump, long jump, and wrestling events. Following his vision loss, he switched his focus to the 100 metres and 200 metres events, winning an essay contest to attend the 2008 Summer Paralympics and making his senior international debut at the 2011 Parapan American Games.

In May 2012, Brown started training with his current coach, Brazilian Olympic champion Joaquim Cruz, at the United States Olympic Training Center site of Chula Vista, California. Brown competed in the 2012 Summer Paralympics, reaching the semifinals in both the 100 meters and 200 meters.

Since 2014, he runs with Jerome Avery, who has competed as a guide at four consecutive Paralympics since 2004, except for the 2020 Summer Paralympics where Brown was guided by Moray Steward.

Brown and Avery were featured in the short documentary Untethered, produced by Swiss sportswear company On and released on August 3, 2021. The documentary was filmed in New York City over the course of 15 months with a team featuring J. B. Smoove and Black Thought.

Brown is a music lover who appreciates a wide variety of genres, including classical music, country, gospel, jazz or reggae. He has played the drums, piano and tenor saxophone in a jazz band or at a local church.
