= Angola at the 1996 Summer Paralympics =

- IPC code: ANG
- NPC: Comité Paralímpico Angolano

in Atlanta
- Competitors: 2 in 1 sport
- Medals: Gold 0 Silver 0 Bronze 0 Total 0

Summer Paralympics appearances (overview)
- 1996; 2000; 2004; 2008; 2012; 2016; 2020; 2024

Angola competed at the 1996 Summer Paralympics in Atlanta, United States. It was the country's first ever participation at the Paralympic Games, as the lengthy Angolan Civil War continued. It was represented by two athletes, who both competed in men's track and field events, without winning a medal.

== Team ==
Angola made their Paralympic game debut in Atlanta, sending 2 athletes, both men. Their participation took place, even as the lengthy Angolan Civil War continued. The team members were Angelo Londaca and Vasco da Fonseca.

== Full results ==
Angelo Londaca competed in the 100 and 200 metre sprints in the T10 category for entirely blind athletes. In the former, he finished sixth out of seven in his heat, and did not advance; in the latter, he was disqualified during the heat. Vasco da Fonseca, in disability category 44, took part in the men's 100 metres, finishing last in his heat, and in the long jump, finishing fourteenth out of seventeen.

Name	Sport	Event	Result	Rank
Ângelo Londaca	Athletics	Men's 100 m T10	12.84	6th in heat 2; did not advance
Ângelo Londaca	Athletics	Men's 200 m T10	dq	dq in heat 2; did not advance
Vasco da Fonseca	Athletics	Men's 100 m T43-44	14.42	9th in heat 2; did not advance
Vasco da Fonseca	Athletics	Men's long jump F44	4.51m	14th

== See also ==
- Angola at the Paralympics
- Angola at the 1996 Summer Olympics
