= Angola at the 2008 Summer Paralympics =

- IPC code: ANG
- NPC: Comité Paralímpico Angolano

in Beijing
- Competitors: 5 in 1 sport
- Flag bearer: Jose Armando Sayovo
- Medals Ranked 54th: Gold 0 Silver 3 Bronze 0 Total 3

Summer Paralympics appearances (overview)
- 1996; 2000; 2004; 2008; 2012; 2016; 2020; 2024

Angola sent a delegation to compete at the 2008 Summer Paralympics in Beijing, China. The country was represented by five athletes, all competing in track and field.

About 10% of Angola's population is reportedly disabled, following the Angolan Civil War.

== Medallists ==
The country won three medals, all silver.

Medal	Name	Sport	Event
Silver	José Armando Sayovo	Athletics	Men's 100m T11
Silver	José Armando Sayovo	Athletics	Men's 200m T11
Silver	José Armando Sayovo	Athletics	Men's 400m T11

== Events ==
=== Athletics ===
==== Men's track ====
Athlete	Class	Event	Heats		Semifinal		Final	
Athlete	Class	Event	Result	Rank	Result	Rank	Result	Rank
José Armando Sayovo	T11	100m	11.23	2 q	11.40	2 Q	11.35	2nd place, silver medalist(s)
José Armando Sayovo	T11	200m	23.05	2 Q	22.83	2 Q	22.70	2nd place, silver medalist(s)
José Armando Sayovo	T11	400m	51.52	1 Q	51.32	3 q	50.44	2nd place, silver medalist(s)
Octavio dos Santos	T11	100m	11.49	4 Q	11.60	7 B	11.64	7
Octavio dos Santos	T11	200m	23.69	6 q	23.47	5 B	23.78	5
Octavio dos Santos	T11	400m	52.66	5 q	52.52	6	did not advance	
Miguel Francisco	T11	100m	11.85	14	did not advance			
Miguel Francisco	T11	200m	24.06	9 q	24.28	9	did not advance	
Domingos Sebastiao	T46	100m	11.34	11	did not advance			
Domingos Sebastiao	T46	200m	23.48	13	did not advance			

==== Women's track ====
Athlete	Class	Event	Heats		Semifinal		Final	
Athlete	Class	Event	Result	Rank	Result	Rank	Result	Rank
Evalina Alexandre	T12	100m	DSQ		did not advance			
Evalina Alexandre	T12	200m	26.31	6 q	25.72	4 q	DSQ	
Evalina Alexandre	T12	400m	59.60	5 B	—		1:00.46	5

== See also ==
- Angola at the Paralympics
- Angola at the 2008 Summer Olympics
