= Aruba at the 2015 Parapan American Games =

- IOC code: ARU
- NOC: Aruba Paralympic Committee
- Website: http://www.paralympic.org/aruba

in Toronto 7–15 August 2015
- Competitors: 1 in 1 sport
- Flag bearer: Albertino Maduro (opening)
- Medals: Gold 0 Silver 0 Bronze 0 Total 0

Parapan American Games appearances
- 1999; 2003; 2007; 2011; 2015; 2019; 2023

Aruba participated in the 2015 Parapan American Games.

== Competitors ==
The following table lists Aruba's delegation per sport and gender.

Sport	Men	Women	Total
Athletics	1	0	1
Total	1	0	1

== Athletics ==
Men

Athlete	Event	Heat		Final	
Athlete	Event	Time	Rank	Time	Rank
Albertino Maduro	100 m T11	14.35	4	Did not advance	
Albertino Maduro	200 m T11	29.97	3	Did not advance	

== See also ==
- Aruba at the 2015 Pan American Games
