= Angola at the 2004 Summer Paralympics =

- IPC code: ANG
- NPC: Comité Paralímpico Angolano

in Athens
- Competitors: 4 in 1 sport
- Medals Ranked 39th: Gold 3 Silver 0 Bronze 0 Total 3

Summer Paralympics appearances (overview)
- 1996; 2000; 2004; 2008; 2012; 2016; 2020; 2024

Angola competed at the 2004 Summer Paralympics in Athens, Greece. The country was represented by four athletes (three men, one woman) who all competed in athletics.

== Medalists ==
Medal	Name	Sport	Event
Gold	José Sayovo	Athletics	Men's 100m T11
Gold	José Sayovo	Athletics	Men's 200m T11
Gold	José Sayovo	Athletics	Men's 400m T11

== Sports ==
=== Athletics ===
==== Men's track ====
Athlete	Class	Event	Heats		Semifinal		Final	
Athlete	Class	Event	Result	Rank	Result	Rank	Result	Rank
Angelo Londaca	T11	100m	12.04	13	did not advance			
Angelo Londaca	T11	200m	25.17	16	did not advance			
José Saiendo	T46	800m	2:03.87	9	did not advance			
José Saiendo	T46	5000m	N/A				15:48.34	11
José Sayovo	T11	100m	11.37 WR	1 Q	11.41	1 Q	11.41	1st place, gold medalist(s)
José Sayovo	T11	200m	23.04 WR	1 Q	23.09	1 Q	22.73 WR	1st place, gold medalist(s)
José Sayovo	T11	400m	50.03 WR	1 Q	51.40	1 Q	51.10	1st place, gold medalist(s)

==== Women's track ====
Athlete	Class	Event	Heats		Semifinal		Final	
Athlete	Class	Event	Result	Rank	Result	Rank	Result	Rank
Estefania Pascoal	T11	100m	14.39	10	did not advance			
Estefania Pascoal	T11	200m	30.44	8 q	30.26	7 B	30.28	4

== See also ==
- Angola at the Paralympics
- Angola at the 2004 Summer Olympics
