= Powerlifting at the 2020 Summer Paralympics – Men's 49 kg =

Powerlifting – Men's 49 kg at the XVI Paralympic Games
- Venue: Tokyo International Forum
- Date: 26 August 2021
- Competitors: 9 from 9 nations

Medalists
1st place, gold medalist(s)		Omar Qarada	Jordan
2nd place, silver medalist(s)		Lê Văn Công	Vietnam
3rd place, bronze medalist(s)		Parvin Mammadov	Azerbaijan

The men's 49 kg powerlifting event at the 2020 Summer Paralympics was contested on 26 August at Tokyo International Forum.

== Records ==
There are twenty powerlifting events, corresponding to ten weight classes each for men and women. Prior to this competition, the existing world and Paralympic records were as follows.

World Record	Lê Văn Công (VIE)	183.5 kg	Mexico City, Mexico	4 December 2017
Paralympic Record	Lê Văn Công (VIE)	183.0 kg	Rio de Janeiro, Brazil	8 September 2016

== Results ==
Rank	Name	Body weight (kg)	Attempts (kg)				Result (kg)
Rank	Name	Body weight (kg)	1	2	3	4	Result (kg)
1st place, gold medalist(s)	Omar Qarada (JOR)	47.21	170	~~172~~	173	–	173
2nd place, silver medalist(s)	Lê Văn Công (VIE)	47.31	165	170	173	–	173
3rd place, bronze medalist(s)	Parvin Mammadov (AZE)	48.26	148	156	~~162~~	–	156
4	Yakubu Adesokan (NGR)	47.27	~~155~~	155	~~161~~	–	155
5	Abdullah Kayapinar (TUR)	45.34	150	~~160~~	~~161~~	–	150
6	João Maria França Junior (BRA)	48.59	139	144	~~157~~	–	144
7	Hadj Ahmed Beyour (ALG)	46.85	138	~~143~~	143	–	143
8	Sławomir Szymański (POL)	48.34	130	136	~~144~~	–	136
9	Hiroshi Miura (JPN)	47.29	122	~~125~~	127	–	127
