= Athletics at the 2015 Parapan American Games – Men's 100 metres T11 =

Athletics – Men's 100 metres T11 at the 2015 Parapan American Games
- Venue: CIBC Athletics Stadium
- Dates: August 10–11
- Competitors: 11 from 7 nations

Medalists
| 1st place, gold medalist(s) | | David Brown (Guide: Jerome Avery) | United States |
| 2nd place, silver medalist(s) | | Lucas Prado (Guide: Justino Barbosa dos Santos) | Brazil |
| 3rd place, bronze medalist(s) | | Delfo Jose Arce Orozco (Guide: Arley Barrios) | Colombia |

The men's T11 100 metres competition of the athletics events at the 2015 Parapan American Games was held between August 10 and 11 at the CIBC Athletics Stadium. The defending Parapan American Games champion was Lucas Prado of Brazil.

== Records ==
Prior to this competition, the existing records were as follows:

| World record | David Brown (USA) | 10.92 | Walnut, United States of America | 18 April 2014 |
| Americas Record | David Brown (USA) | 10.92 | Walnut, United States of America | 18 April 2014 |
| Parapan Am Record | Lucas Prado (BRA) | 11.15 | Guadalajara, Mexico | 15 November 2011 |

=== Records Broken ===
| Parapan Am record | David Brown (USA) | 10.95 | Toronto, Canada | 11 August 2015 |

== Schedule ==
All times are Central Standard Time (UTC-6).

| Date | Time | Round |
|---|---|---|
| 10 August | 19:42 | Semifinal 1 |
| 10 August | 19:48 | Semifinal 2 |
| 10 August | 19:54 | Semifinal 3 |
| 11 August | 18:23 | Final |

== Results ==
All times are shown in seconds.

| KEY: | q | Fastest non-qualifiers | Q | Qualified | PR | Parapan American Games record | NR | National record | PB | Personal best | SB | Seasonal best | DSQ | Disqualified | FS | False start |

=== Semifinals ===
The fastest from each heat and next overall fastest qualified for the final.

==== Semifinal 1 ====
Wind -0.3 m/s

| Rank | Name | Nation | Time | Notes |
|---|---|---|---|---|
| 1 | Lucas Prado (Guide: Justino Barbosa dos Santos) | Brazil | 11.36 | Q, SB |
| 2 | Jesus Diaz (Guide: Yoandri Mosquera Medina) | Venezuela | 11.70 | q |
| 3 | Alexis Acosta (Guide: Bruno Zanacchi) | Argentina | 13.16 | |
| 4 | Albertino Maduro (Guide: Jesus Arias de la Cruz) | Aruba | 14.35 | |

==== Semifinal 2 ====
Wind -0.7 m/s

| Rank | Name | Nation | Time | Notes |
|---|---|---|---|---|
| 1 | David Brown (Guide: Jerome Avery) | United States | 11.16 | Q |
| 2 | Alberto Cretton Salas (Guide: Ignacio Pignataro) | Argentina | 12.28 | PB |
| 3 | Breylin Martinez Gonzalez (Guide: Domingo Reyes Sanchez) | Dominican Republic | 12.35 | PB |

==== Semifinal 3 ====
Wind -0.7 m/s

| Rank | Name | Nation | Time | Notes |
|---|---|---|---|---|
| 1 | Delfo Jose Arce Orozco (Guide: Arley Barrios) | Colombia | 11.91 | Q |
| 2 | Felipe de Souza Gomes (Guide: Jorge Pereira Borges) | Brazil | 12.15 | |
| 3 | Franco Bravo (Guide: Martin Sabio) | Argentina | 12.47 | |
| 4 | Mauricio Chavez (Guide: Marcos Ramirez) | Mexico | 12.85 | |

=== Final ===
Wind +2.0 m/s

| Rank | Name | Nation | Time | Notes |
|---|---|---|---|---|
| 1st place, gold medalist(s) | David Brown (Guide: Jerome Avery) | United States | 10.95 | PR |
| 2nd place, silver medalist(s) | Lucas Prado (Guide: Justino Barbosa dos Santos) | Brazil | 11.11 | SB |
| 3rd place, bronze medalist(s) | Delfo Jose Arce Orozco (Guide: Arley Barrios) | Colombia | 11.56 | PB |
| 4 | Jesus Diaz (Guide: Yoandri Mosquera Medina) | Venezuela | 11.74 | |
