= Beytullah Eroğlu =

Turkish Paralympic swimmer (born 1995)

Personal information
- Full name: Beytullah Eroğlu
- Nationality: Turkish
- Born: 25 September 1995 (age 30) Kahramanmaraş, Turkey
- Height: 1.60 m (5 ft 3 in)
- Weight: 44 kg (97 lb)

Sport
- Sport: Swimming
- Strokes: Backstroke, butterfly, freestyle
- Club: İstanbul Büyükşehir Belediyesi S.K.
- Coach: Mehmet Fatih Kurt
Medal record
Men's para swimming
Representing Turkey
World Championships
Bronze medal – third place	2017 Mexico City	50 m backstroke S5
Gold medal – first place	2017 Mexico City	50 m butterfly S5
Bronze medal – third place	2015 Glasgow	50 m backstroke S5
European Championships
Bronze medal – third place	2016 Funchal	50 m butterfly S5
Silver medal – second place	2014 Eindhoven	50 m butterfly S5

Beytullah Eroğlu (born 25 September 1995) is a Turkish Paralympic swimmer. He competes in the disability category of S5 in freestyle, butterfly and backstroke, specializing in sprint events. He competed in the 2012 and 2016 Summer Paralympics, at four World Para Swimming Championships and two IPC Swimming European Championships. At the 2017 World Championships, he won his country's first ever gold medal in Paralympic swimming.

== Personal history ==
Beytullah Eroğlu was born to Mustafa Eroğlu and his wife Hilal in Kahramanmaraş, southern Turkey on 25 September 1995. He is the family's oldest of four children. He was born without arms and a leg 12 cm (4.7 in) shorter than the other.

He had a secluded life in his childhood. He did not leave his home until the age of seven. The life of the introverted boy has changed when his father persisted in his schooling. He learned to use his foot for writing, and made friends with his classmates. As he became known in the local media, Osman Çullu, the chairman of the Kahramanmaraş Para Swimming Club and the national team coach, visited the family. He proposed Beytullah to learn swimming. However, the disabled child became very scared thinking how can he will be able to swim with not arms,. Later, he got persuaded, and began to exercise swimming with the help of a raft. It took six hard years to learn swimming. Performing sport made him a happy individual. "When asked where his arms are", he jokingly replies "they were too heavy, I left them at home".

The 1.60 m (5 ft 3 in) tall physically disabled swimmer at 44 kg (97 lb) is currently a student of physical education at Istanbul University.

== Swimming career ==
Eroğlu was inspired to try the competition swimming after watching the 2000 Olympic and Paralympic Games in Sydney, Australia in the television. He also saw swimming as an opportunity to become more sociable. He began swimming in his hometown in 2001.

His uncle Şeref Eroğlu, silver medalist sport wrestler at the 2004 Summer Olympics in Athens, Greece, became a role model for him. He participated in competitive swimming first in 2007. He holds national records in seven events (59 m freestyle S5e, 50 m butterfly S5, 50 m backstroke S5, 100 m freestyle S5, 100 m breaststroke SB5, 200 freestyle S5 and 200 m individual medley SM5).

Eroğlu internationally debuted at the 2010 IPC Swimming World Championships in Eindhoven, the Netherlands. He qualified for the Turkey national team for the 2012 Summer Paralympics in London, United Kingdom. he participated at the 2013 IPC Swimming World Championships in Montreal, Canada. He won his first medal, a silver medal in the 50m Butterfly S5 event at the 2014 European Championships held in Eindhoven. Eroğlu won a bronze medal in the 50m Backstroke S5 at the 2015 IPC Swimming World Championships in Glasgow, Scotland, and another bronze medal in the 50m Butterfly S5 event at the 2016 European Championships in Funchal, Portugal. He represented his country at the 2016 Summer Paralympics in Rio de Janeiro, Brazil without reaching to any medal. Eroğlu took his country's first ever gold medal in Paralympic swimming at the 2017 World Championships held in Mexico City, Mexico in the 50m Butterfly S5 event. He won also a bronze medal in the 50m Backstroke S5 event of the same tournament.

Eroğlu's disability swimming classification is S5 due to his limb deficiency as a birth defect. He is coached by Mehmet Fatih Kurt in the sports club İstanbul Büyükşehir Belediyesi S.K., which gave him access to a swimming facility in Istanbul. His father Mustafa Eroğlu is his manager.

== Achievements ==
Competition	Place	Event	Rank	Time
2010 World Championships	[Netherlands, Eindhoven	50m Backstroke S5	6	45.46
2010 World Championships	[Netherlands, Eindhoven	50m Butterfly S5	6	44.15
2010 World Championships	[Netherlands, Eindhoven	50m Freestyle S5	14	45.25
2012 Paralympic Games	United Kingdom, London	50m Backstroke S5	Heats	43.11
2012 Paralympic Games	United Kingdom, London	50m Butterfly S5	7	41.44
2012 Paralympic Games	United Kingdom, London	100m Freestyle S5	Heats	1:38.45
2013 World Championships	Canada, Montreal	50m Backstroke S5	4	43.85
2013 World Championships	Canada, Montreal	50m Butterfly S5	4	39.38
2013 World Championships	Canada, Montreal	200m Individual Medley SM5	6	3:33.38
2014 European Championships	Netherlands, Eindhoven	50m Backstroke S5	4	41.67
2014 European Championships	Netherlands, Eindhoven	50m Butterfly S5	2nd place, silver medalist(s)	38.188
2014 European Championships	Netherlands, Eindhoven	200m Individual Medley SM5	4	3:30.39
2015 World Championships	United Kingdom, Glasgow	50m Backstroke S5	3rd place, bronze medalist(s)	40.27
2015 World Championships	United Kingdom, Glasgow	50m Butterfly S5	4	38.00
2016 European Championships	Portugal, Funchal	50m Backstroke S5	7	3:30.39
2016 European Championships	Portugal, Funchal	50m Butterfly S5	3rd place, bronze medalist(s)	38.41
2016 Paralympic Games	Brazil, Rio de Janeiro	50m Backstroke S5	6	41.31
2016 Paralympic Games	Brazil, Rio de Janeiro	50m Butterfly S5	5	38.70
2017 World Championships	Mexico, Mexico City	50m Backstroke S5	3rd place, bronze medalist(s)	42.05
2017 World Championships	Mexico, Mexico City	50m Butterfly S5	1st place, gold medalist(s)	38.35
2017 World Championships	Mexico, Mexico City	100m Freestyle S5	4	1:27.51
2017 World Championships	Mexico, Mexico City	200m Freestyle S5	4	3:21.52
2019 World Para Swimming Championships	United Kingdom London	50 m Backstroke S5	6th	39.84
