= Angola at the 2024 Summer Paralympics =

2024 sporting event delegation in Paris

- Flag of Angola
- IPC code: ANG
- NPC: Comité Paralímpico Angolano

in Paris, France August 28, 2024 – September 8, 2024
- Competitors: 2 (1 man and 1 woman) in 1 sport
- Flag bearers: Juliana Moko; Abraao Sapalo
- Medals: Gold 0 Silver 0 Bronze 0 Total 0

Summer Paralympics appearances (overview)
- 1996; 2000; 2004; 2008; 2012; 2016; 2020; 2024

Angola competed at the 2024 Summer Paralympics in Paris, France, from 28 August to 8 September 2024.

== Competitors ==
The following is the list of number of competitors in the Games, including game-eligible alternates in team sports.

Sport	Men	Women	Total
Athletics	1	1	2
Total	1	1	2

== Athletics ==
Key

- Note–Ranks given for track events are within the athlete's heat only
- Q = Qualified for the next round
- q = Qualified for the next round as a fastest loser or, in field events, by position without achieving the qualifying target
- DQ = Disqualified
- PR = Paralympic Record
- AR = Area (or continental) Record
- NR = National Record
- N/A = Round not applicable for the event
- Bye = Athlete not required to compete in round

Track & road events
Men

Athlete	Event	Heat		Final	
Athlete	Event	Result	Rank	Result	Rank
Sabino Benbua	Men's 400 m T47	53.30	7	Did not advance	

Women

Athlete	Event	Heat		Semifinal		Final	
Athlete	Event	Result	Rank	Result	Rank	Result	Rank
Juliana Moko	Women's 100 m T11	12.51	2 q	12.56	4	Did not advance	
Juliana Moko	Women's 200 m T11	26.28	4	Did not advance			
Juliana Moko	Women's 400 m T11	1:03.78	2 q	1:01.69	3	Did not advance	

== See also ==
- Angola at the 2024 Summer Olympics
- Angola at the Paralympics
