= Powerlifting at the 2016 Summer Paralympics – Men's 49 kg =

Powerlifting – Men's 49 kg at the XV Paralympic Games
- Venue: Riocentro
- Date: 4 September 2016
- Competitors: 9 from 9 nations
- Winning lift: 181.0 kg PR

Medalists
| 1st place, gold medalist(s) | | Lê Văn Công | Vietnam |
| 2nd place, silver medalist(s) | | Omar Qarada | Jordan |
| 3rd place, bronze medalist(s) | | Nándor Tunkel | Hungary |

The men's 49 kg powerlifting event at the 2016 Summer Paralympics was contested on 9 September at Riocentro.

== Records ==
There are twenty powerlifting events, corresponding to ten weight classes each for men and women. The weight categories were significantly adjusted after the 2012 Games so most of the weights are new for 2016. As a result, no Paralympic record was available for this weight class prior to the competition. The existing world records were as follows.

| Record Type | Weight | Country | Venue | Date |
|---|---|---|---|---|
| World record | 182 kg | Lê Văn Công (VIE) | Almaty | 26 July 2015 |
| Paralympic record | – | – | – | – |

== Results ==
| Rank | Name | Body weight (kg) | Attempts (kg) | | | | Result (kg) |
| Rank | Name | Body weight (kg) | 1 | 2 | 3 | 4 | Result (kg) |
|---|---|---|---|---|---|---|---|
| 1st place, gold medalist(s) | Lê Văn Công (VIE) | 47.54 | 175.0 | ~~179.0~~ | 181.0 | 183.0 WR PR | 181.0 |
| 2nd place, silver medalist(s) | Omar Qarada (JOR) | 47.05 | 170.0 | 177.0 | ~~181.0~~ | – | 177.0 |
| 3rd place, bronze medalist(s) | Nándor Tunkel (HUN) | 47.31 | 150.0 | 155.0 | ~~160.0~~ | | 155.0 |
| 4 | Basha Farman (IND) | 45.65 | 140.0 | ~~150.0~~ | ~~155.0~~ | – | 140.0 |
| 5 | Hiroshi Miura (JPN) | 45.88 | 121.0 | 126.0 | ~~136.0~~ | – | 126.0 |
| 6 | Pia (LAO) | 45.81 | 121.0 | ~~125.0~~ | ~~126.0~~ | – | 121.0 |
| - | Aliou Bawa (TOG) | 42.92 | ~~113.0~~ | ~~113.0~~ | ~~113.0~~ | – | NMR |
| - | Choi Keunjin (KOR) | 48.02 | ~~140.0~~ | ~~140.0~~ | ~~140.0~~ | – | NMR |
| - | Patrick Ardon (FRA) | 48.26 | ~~146.0~~ | ~~151.0~~ | ~~151.0~~ | – | NMR |
