= Swimming at the 2016 Summer Paralympics – Men's 50 metre freestyle S5 =

Men's 50 metre freestyle S5 at the XV Paralympic Games
- Venue: Olympic Aquatics Stadium
- Dates: 12 September 2016
- Competitors: 15 from 13 nations

Medalists
1st place, gold medalist(s)		Daniel Dias	Brazil
2nd place, silver medalist(s)		Võ Thanh Tùng	Vietnam
3rd place, bronze medalist(s)		Roy Perkins	United States

The Men's 50 metre freestyle S5 event at the 2016 Paralympic Games took place on 12 September 2016, at the Olympic Aquatics Stadium. Two heats were held. The swimmers with the eight fastest times advanced to the final.

== Heats ==
=== Heat 1 ===
11:54 12 September 2016:

Rank	Lane	Name	Nationality	Time	Notes
1	4	Roy Perkins	United States	34.22	Q
2	5	Sebastian Rodriguez	Spain	34.96	Q
3	6	Giovanni Sciaccaluga	Italy	36.35	Q
4	3	Clodoaldo Silva	Brazil	36.67	Q
5	7	Jonas Larsen	Denmark	37.82	
6	2	Jamery Siga	Malaysia	38.79	
7	1	Edgar Hugo Pineda Castro	Mexico	39.42	

=== Heat 2 ===
11:57 12 September 2016:

Rank	Lane	Name	Nationality	Time	Notes
1	4	Daniel Dias	Brazil	33.55	Q
2	5	Võ Thanh Tùng	Vietnam	33.87	Q
3	6	He Shiwei	China	35.41	Q
4	3	Andrew Mullen	Great Britain	35.75	Q
5	2	Theo Curin	France	36.77	
6	7	James Scully	Ireland	37.38	
7	8	Antonios Tsapatakis	Greece	37.57	
8	1	Diego Lopez Diaz	Mexico	41.22	

== Final ==
20:28 12 September 2016:

Rank	Lane	Name	Nationality	Time	Notes
1st place, gold medalist(s)	4	Daniel Dias	Brazil	32.78	
2nd place, silver medalist(s)	5	Võ Thanh Tùng	Vietnam	33.94	
3rd place, bronze medalist(s)	3	Roy Perkins	United States	34.42	
4	6	Sebastian Rodriguez	Spain	34.62	
5	7	Andrew Mullen	Great Britain	34.87	
6	2	He Shiwei	China	35.60	
7	8	Clodoaldo Silva	Brazil	36.27	
8	1	Giovanni Sciaccaluga	Italy	36.85	
