= Vietnam at the 2004 Summer Paralympics =

- IPC code: VIE
- NPC: Vietnam Paralympic Association

in Athens
- Competitors: 4 in 3 sports
- Medals: Gold 0 Silver 0 Bronze 0 Total 0

Summer Paralympics appearances (overview)
- 2000; 2004; 2008; 2012; 2016; 2020; 2024

Vietnam competed at the 2004 Summer Paralympics in Athens, Greece. The country was represented by four athletes competing in three sports: track and field, powerlifting and swimming. Vietnam's delegation had the particularity of being composed entirely of female athletes. None won a medal.

== Athletics ==
In track and field, Nhu Thi Khoa took part in the 200m and 400m sprints, in the T54 and T53 categories, respectively, and finished last in her heats in both. In the former, she finished with a time of 35.98. In the latter, she completed the race in 1:03.26.

== Powerlifting ==
=== Women ===
Athlete	Event	Result	Rank
Hoang Tyuet Loan Chau	48kg	80.0	5
Thi Hong Nguyen	44kg	75.0	5

=== Swimming ===
In swimming, in the 100m breaststroke (SB11 category), Nguyen Thi Hao was a non-starter.

== See also ==
- Vietnam at the Paralympics
- Vietnam at the 2004 Summer Olympics
