= Lucas Prado =

Brazilian Paralympic athlete (born 1985)

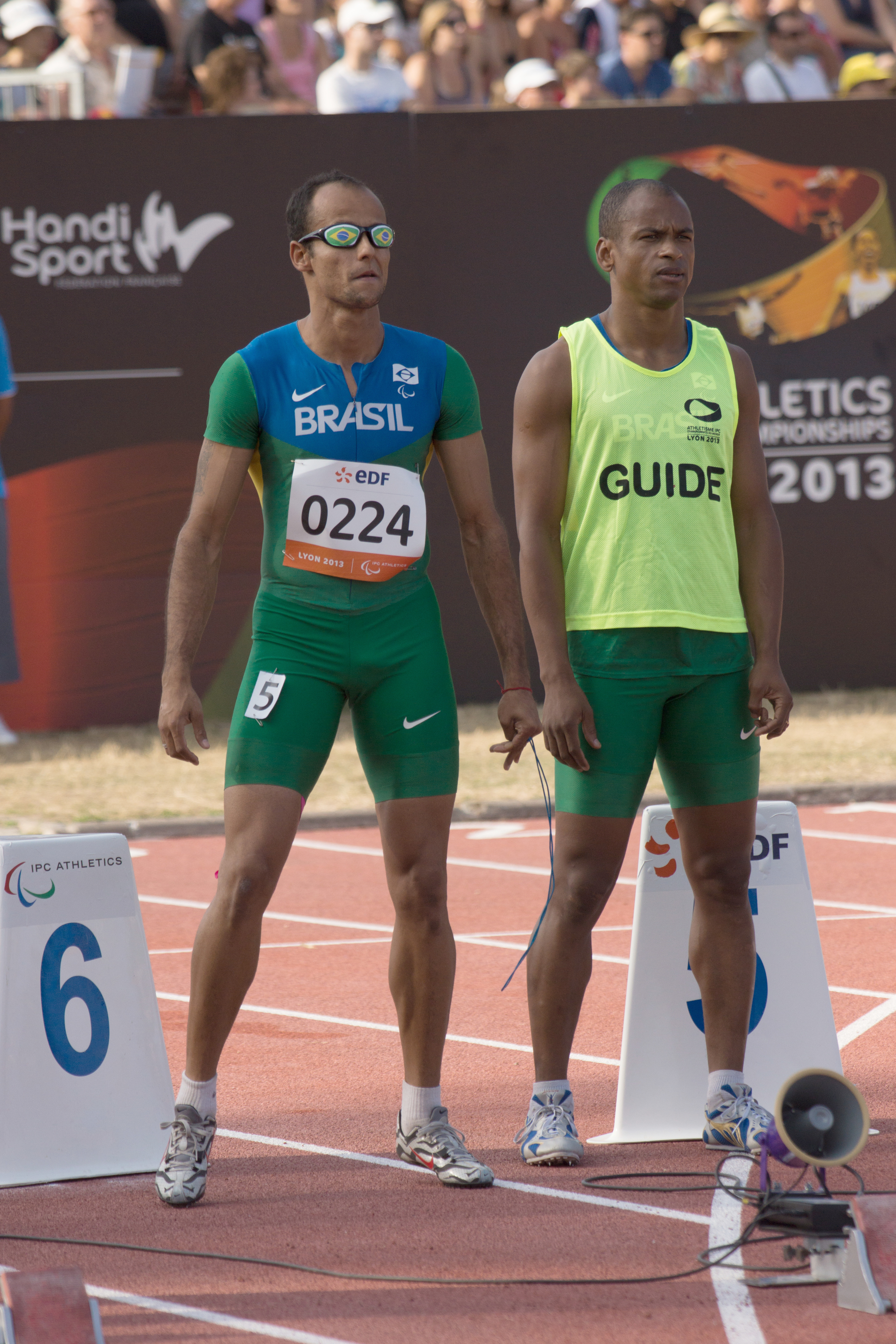
- Prado at the 2013 IPC Athletics World Championships.

Personal information
- Born: 27 May 1985 (age 41) Mato Grosso, Brazil

Sport
- Country: Brazil
- Sport: Para athletics
Medal record
Representing Brazil
Men's para athletics
Paralympic Games
Gold medal – first place	2008 Beijing	100 m T11
Gold medal – first place	2008 Beijing	200 m T11
Gold medal – first place	2008 Beijing	400 m T11
Silver medal – second place	2012 London	100 m T11
Silver medal – second place	2012 London	400 m T11
World Championships
Gold medal – first place	2011 Christchurch	100 m T11
Gold medal – first place	2011 Christchurch	200 m T11
Gold medal – first place	2011 Christchurch	400 m T11
Gold medal – first place	2013 Lyon	100 m T11
Gold medal – first place	2013 Lyon	200 m T11
Gold medal – first place	2019 Dubai	100m T11
Parapan American Games
Gold medal – first place	2007 Rio de Janeiro	100m T11
Gold medal – first place	2007 Rio de Janeiro	200m T11
Gold medal – first place	2007 Rio de Janeiro	400m T11
Gold medal – first place	2011 Guadalajara	100m T11
Gold medal – first place	2011 Guadalajara	200m T11
Gold medal – first place	2019 Lima	100m T11
Silver medal – second place	2015 Toronto	100 m T11
Men's para-cycling
Track World Championships
Bronze medal – third place	2026 Apeldoorn	Mixed team sprint B

Lucas Prado (born 27 May 1985 in Mato Grosso) is a visually impaired Brazilian athlete. He lost 90% of his vision in 2003 due to retinal detachment. He was introduced to track by friend and Paralympian Terezinha Guilhermina.

He won three gold medals in track for Brazil at the 2008 Summer Paralympics, setting a world record, and won two silver medals running 100m and 400m during the London 2012 Paralympic Games.
