= Nguyễn Thành Trung =

Vietnamese Paralympic swimmer

Medal record

Swimming

Representing Vietnam

Asian Para Games
Gold medal – first place	2018 Jakarta	100m Breaststroke SB4

ASEAN Para Games
Gold medal – first place	2017 Malaysia	Men's 50m Backstroke - SB4
Gold medal – first place	2017 Malaysia	Men's 100m Backstroke - SB4
Gold medal – first place	2015 Singapore	Men's 1000m Backstroke - SB4
Bronze medal – third place	2015 Singapore	Men's 50m Backstroke - S5

Nguyễn Thành Trung (born 1 January 1982) is a Vietnamese Paralympic swimmer.
