= Matthias Schmidt =

German historian

Matthias Schmidt (born 1952) is a German historian and author who first revealed in a university dissertation and then in the book, Albert Speer: The End of a Myth, the role that Albert Speer had played in the Holocaust.

== History ==
Schmidt earned his doctorate at the Friedrich Meinecke Institute for Historical Research at the Free University of Berlin. In 1980 he was given privileged access to the personal chronicle (diary) of Albert Speer that had hitherto been held privately by Rudolf Wolters, the long time friend and collaborator of Speer. After Speer's death Schmidt published a dissertation and then a book that for the first time detailed Speer's expulsion of the Jews from their Berlin homes and accused Speer of lying about his involvement in the Holocaust.

== Albert Speer: The End of a Myth ==
Schmidt wrote Albert Speer: The End of a Myth. The book was reviewed by Henry A. Turner Jr. in The New York Times. Turner wrote "By demolishing Speer's carefully tailored image of himself, Matthias Schmidt has contributed to setting the record straight" and "Through some resourceful research, he has compiled an impressive catalogue of discrepancies between Speer's postwar versions of his career and the documented record, which Mr. Schmidt has augmented with some hitherto unused materials". A review in Kirkus said "from records in the possession of Speer's closest associate, and other researches, German historian Schmidt (Free Univ. of Berlin) sets forth Speer's verifiable role in the Nazi hierarchy and his literary strategems to conceal it. The documentation is damning, the account stinging."
