= Gautier Makunda =

French Paralympic athlete

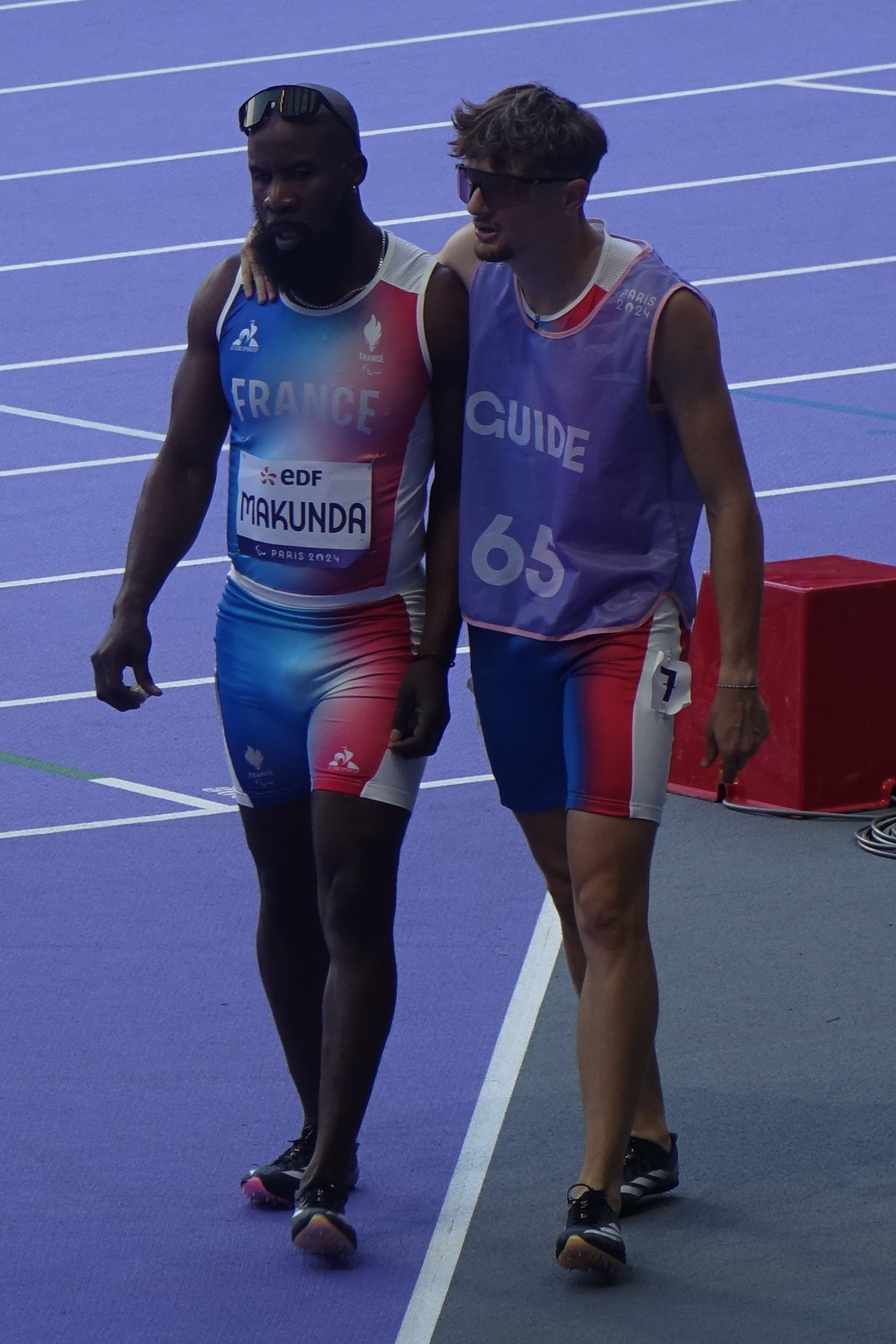
- Makunda (left) at the 2024 Summer Paralympics

Personal information
- Full name: Trésor Gautier Makunda
- Nationality: French
- Born: 15 September 1983 (age 42) Kinshasa, Zaire
- Height: 180 cm (5 ft 11 in)

Sport
- Country: France
- Sport: Athletics
- Disability class: T11
- Club: CA Montreuil
- Coached by: Jean-Baptiste Souche (national); Guy Ontanon (personal)
Medal record
Men's para athletics
Representing France
Paralympic Games
Silver medal – second place	2004 Athens	100 m T11
Bronze medal – third place	2008 Beijing	100 m T11
Bronze medal – third place	2008 Beijing	100 m relay T11–13
Bronze medal – third place	2012 London	400 m T11
Bronze medal – third place	2020 Tokyo	400 m T11
World Championships
Gold medal – first place	2006 Assen	100 m T11
Silver medal – second place	2025 New Delhi	400 m T11
Bronze medal – third place	2013 Lyon	100 m relay T11–13
European Championships
Silver medal – second place	2014 Swansea	100 m relay T11–13

Trésor Gautier Makunda (born 15 September 1983) is a Paralympian athlete from France competing mainly in category T11 sprint events. Makunda has won a total of one silver and three bronze medals across three Summer Paralympics, beginning with a second-place finish in the T11 10mm sprint at the 2004 Summer Paralympics in Athens. He is a regular member of the French relay team in the T11–13 4 × 100 m relay.

He appeared in the 2011 Regis Wargnier film La Ligne droite.
