= Nguyễn Thị Hồng (powerlifter) =

Vietnamese Paralympic powerlifter

Personal information
- Born: 17 March 1979 (age 47)

Sport
- Sport: Paralympic powerlifting
Medal record
Representing Vietnam
Asian Para Games
Bronze medal – third place	2010 Guangzhou	40kg

Nguyễn Thị Hồng (born 17 March 1979) is a Vietnamese female Paralympic powerlifter. She competed in 2004 Summer Paralympics and 2012 Summer Paralympics. She won a bronze medal at the 2010 Asian Para Games in the 40 kg event.
