= Cao Ngọc Hùng =

Vietnamese Paralympic javelin thrower

Personal information
- Born: 10 March 1990 (age 36)

Sport
- Country: Vietnam
- Sport: Para-athletics
- Event: Javelin throw
Medal record
Representing Vietnam
Paralympic athletics
Paralympic Games
Bronze medal – third place	2016 Rio de Janeiro	Javelin throw F57
Asian Para Games
Bronze medal – third place	2010 Guangzhou	Discus throw F57-58
Bronze medal – third place	2014 Incheon	Javelin throw F57

Cao Ngọc Hùng (10 March 1990) is a Vietnamese Paralympic javelin thrower.

He won the bronze medal in the men's javelin throw F57 event at the 2016 Summer Paralympics.
