= Võ Thanh Tùng =

Vietnamese Paralympic swimmer

Medal record

Swimming

Representing Vietnam

Paralympic Games
Silver medal – second place	2016 Rio	50 m freestyle S5

IPC World Championships
Bronze medal – third place	2015 Glasgow	50m freestyle - S5

Asian Para Games
Gold medal – first place	2010 Guangzhou	Men's 50m Freestyle - S5
Gold medal – first place	2014 Incheon	Men's 50m Freestyle - S5
Gold medal – first place	2014 Incheon	Men's 100m Freestyle - S5
Gold medal – first place	2014 Incheon	Men's 200m Freestyle - S5
Gold medal – first place	2014 Incheon	Men's 50m Butterfly - S5
Gold medal – first place	2014 Incheon	Men's 50m Backstroke - S5
Gold medal – first place	2014 Incheon	Men's 4x50 Relay Medley 20P
Gold medal – first place	2018 Jakarta	Men's 100m Freestyle - S5
Gold medal – first place	2018 Jakarta	Men's 200m Freestyle - S5
Gold medal – first place	2018 Jakarta	Men's 50m Backstroke - S5
Silver medal – second place	2010 Guangzhou	Men's 100m Freestyle - S5
Silver medal – second place	2018 Jakarta	Men's 50m Butterfly - S5 (2–5)
Silver medal – second place	2018 Jakarta	Men's 50m Freestyle - S5

ASEAN Para Games
Gold medal – first place	2015 Singapore	Men's 50m Freestyle - S5
Gold medal – first place	2015 Singapore	Men's 100m Freestyle - S5
Gold medal – first place	2015 Singapore	Men's 50m Backstroke - S5
Gold medal – first place	2015 Singapore	4×50 m Medley Relay 20 Points
Gold medal – first place	2017 Malaysia	Men's 50m Freestyle - S5
Gold medal – first place	2017 Malaysia	Men's 200m Freestyle - S5
Gold medal – first place	2017 Malaysia	Men's 100m Backstroke - S5
Silver medal – second place	2015 Singapore	Men's 200m Freestyle - S5
Silver medal – second place	2015 Singapore	Men's 50m Butterfly - S5

Võ Thanh Tùng (born 26 July 1985) is a Vietnamese Paralympic swimmer. He won gold in the men's 50m freestyle S5 (para-swimming classification) at the 2010 Asian Para Games in China. He is seen as a possible medal contender for his nation. He lives in Cần Thơ and had poliomyelitis as a child.
