= Lê Văn Công =

Vietnamese Paralympic powerlifter

Personal information
- Nationality: Vietnam
- Born: June 20, 1984 (age 42) Hà Tĩnh, Vietnam
- Weight: 48 kg (106 lb)

Sport
- Sport: Powerlifting
Medal record
Representing Vietnam
Men's powerlifting
Summer Paralympics
Gold medal – first place	2016 Rio de Janeiro	-49 kg
Silver medal – second place	2020 Tokyo	-49 kg
Bronze medal – third place	2024 Paris	-49 kg
World Championships
Gold medal – first place	2017 Mexico City	-49 kg
Silver medal – second place	2014 Dubai	-49 kg
Silver medal – second place	2021 Tbilisi	-49 kg
Asian Para Games
Gold medal – first place	2014 Incheon	-49 kg
Bronze medal – third place	2022 Hangzhou	-49 kg
ASEAN Para Games
Gold medal – first place	2015 Singapore	-49 kg
Gold medal – first place	2017 Kuala Lumpur	-49 kg

Lê Văn Công (born 20 June 1984 in Hà Tĩnh Province) is a Vietnamese sports powerlifter who participated in the 2008 Paralympics and was crowned champion of the men's 49 kg event at the 2016 Summer Paralympics. He became the first Vietnamese athlete to win a gold medal in the history of the Summer Paralympics.

== Career ==
Lê Văn Công made history at the 2016 Summer Paralympics in Rio de Janeiro, Brazil, by winning the gold medal in the men's 49 kg event with a lift of 181 kg, marking the first-ever Paralympic gold medal won by a Vietnamese athlete. In 2017, Lê Văn Công won the gold medal in the men's 49 kg event at the World Para Powerlifting Championships held in Mexico City, Mexico, where he set a world record by successfully lifting 183.5 kg. He won the silver medal in his event at the 2021 World Para Powerlifting Championships held in Tbilisi, Georgia. He returned to the top of the podium at the 2023 World Para Powerlifting Championships in Dubai, United Arab Emirates, where he claimed another gold medal after lifting 176 kg.

Lê Văn Công achieved consecutive podium finishes at the Summer Paralympics across three cycles. Following his 2016 victory, he won the silver medal in the men's 49 kg event at the 2020 Summer Paralympics held in Tokyo, Japan. He won the bronze medal in the men's 49 kg event at the 2024 Summer Paralympics held in Paris, France. In November 2025, Lê Văn Công was honored by French authorities with a special commemorative gold medal recognizing his enduring sportsmanship and legacy within the Paralympic movement. He continued competing into 2026, winning a silver medal at the Asia–Oceania Para Powerlifting Championships in Bangkok, Thailand.

Regionally, Lê Văn Công has maintained a dominant presence at the ASEAN Para Games, securing consecutive gold medals in the men's 49 kg division across multiple editions, including the 2014, 2015, 2017, 2022, and 2023 Games. He extended this regional championship streak into the 13th ASEAN Para Games held in Thailand, capturing another gold medal in his weight class.
