= José Sayovo =

Angolan Paralympic athlete

Medal record

Paralympic athletics

Representing Angola

Paralympic Games
Gold medal – first place	2004 Athens	100 m
Gold medal – first place	2004 Athens	200 m
Gold medal – first place	2004 Athens	400 m
Gold medal – first place	2012 London	400 m
Silver medal – second place	2008 Beijing	100 m
Silver medal – second place	2008 Beijing	200 m
Silver medal – second place	2008 Beijing	400 m
Bronze medal – third place	2012 London	200 m

All-Africa Games
Silver medal – second place	2011 Maputo	400m T11

José Armando Sayovo (born 3 March 1973) is an Angolan Paralympic track and field athlete.

He was the first person to win a Paralympic medal for the Republic of Angola after he won three gold medals, in the 100m, 200m and 400m sprints, at the 2004 Summer Paralympic Games in Athens.

He represented Angola again at the 2008 Summer Paralympics in Beijing, and was his country's flagbearer during the Games' opening ceremony. He won three silver medals, in the men's 100m, 200m and 400m sprints.

At the age of 39, he won a bronze medal in the 200m and won a gold medal in the 400m at the 2012 Summer Paralympics in London.

As of 2025 he is the vice president of the Angolan Paralympic Committee. There is an adapted sports facility named after him in Caxito.
