= Châu Hoàng Tuyết Loan =

Vietnamese Paralympic powerlifter (born 1975)

Personal information
- Born: 18 February 1975 (age 51) Nha Trang, Vietnam

Sport
- Sport: Paralympic powerlifting
Medal record
Powerlifting
Representing Vietnam
Asian Para Games
Silver medal – second place	2018 Jakarta	55kg

Châu Hoàng Tuyết Loan (born 18 February 1975) is a Vietnamese female Paralympic powerlifter. She contracted polio when she was four months old, and has been using a wheelchair since. She started weightlifting in 2001, at Nha Trang Fitness Club, and works as a restaurant manager. At the 2018 Asian Para Games she won the silver medal in the 55 kg category.
