= Volleyball at the Summer Paralympics =

- Standing (1976–2000) / Sitting (1980–present)
- Governing body: World ParaVolley
- Events: 2 (men: 1; women: 1)

Games
- 1960; 1964; 1968; 1972; 1976; 1980; 1984; 1988; 1992; 1996; 2000; 2004; 2008; 2012; 2016; 2020; 2024
- Medalists

Volleyball at the Summer Paralympics was first held in 1976, when the traditional form of standing volleyball for men was contested and sitting volleyball for men was a demonstration sport. From 1980 through 2000, men's standing and sitting events were contested. The women's sitting volleyball event was introduced in 2004.

== Medal summary ==
=== Sitting ===
Men's sitting volleyball medal winners for every Summer Games was as follows:

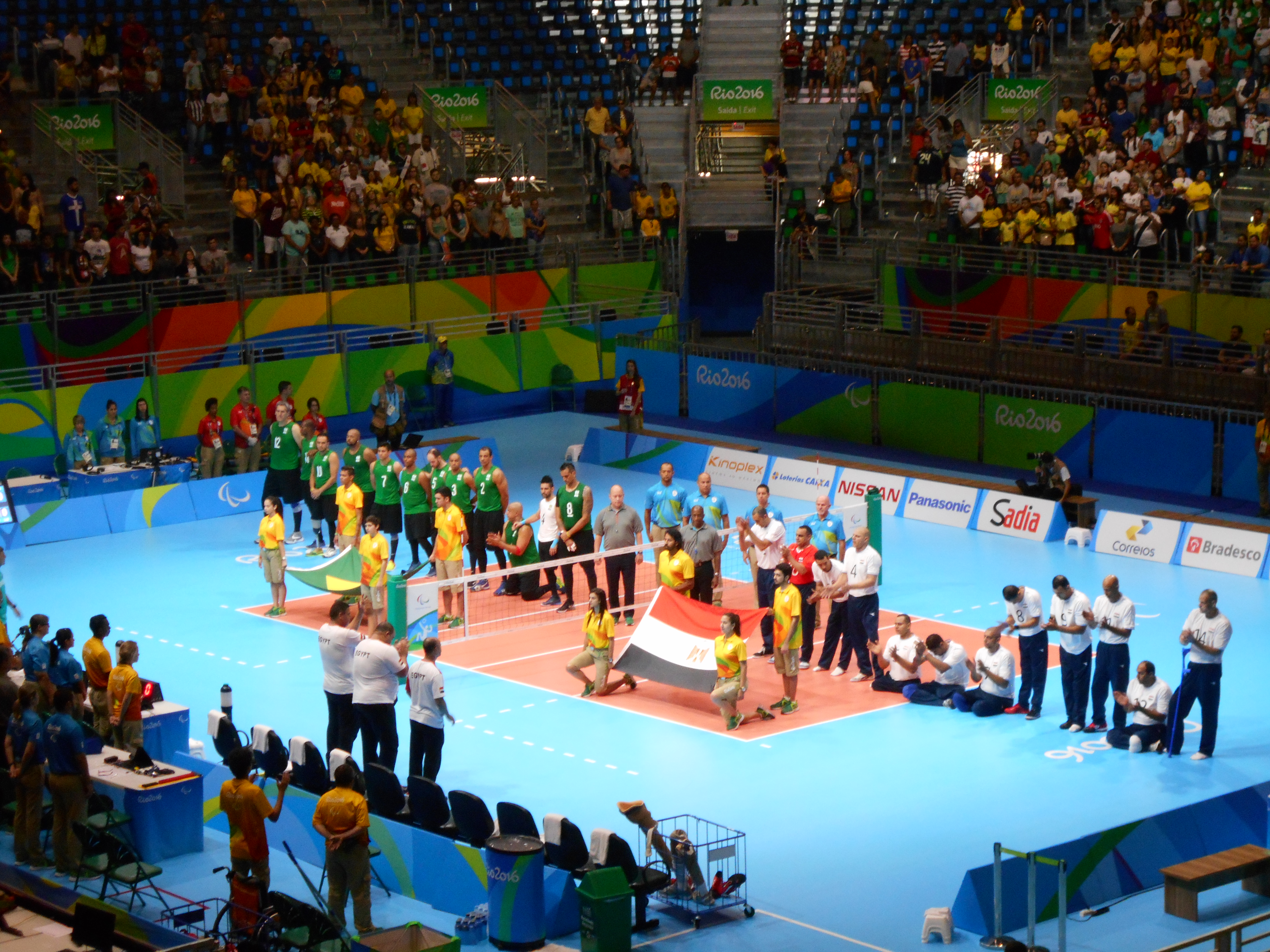
Brazil versus Egypt men's match at the 2016 Summer Paralympics in Rio

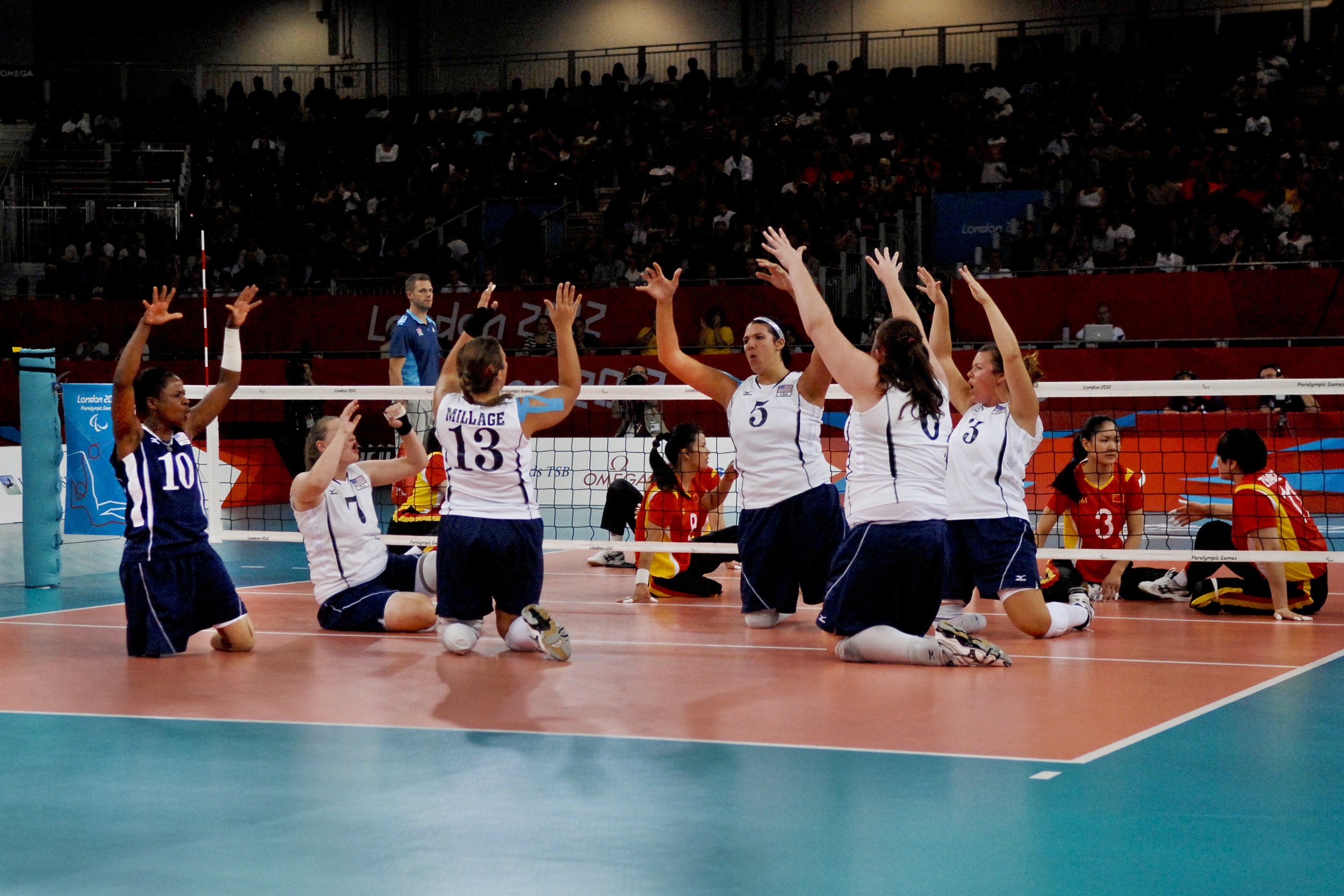
United States versus China women's match at the 2012 Summer Paralympics in London

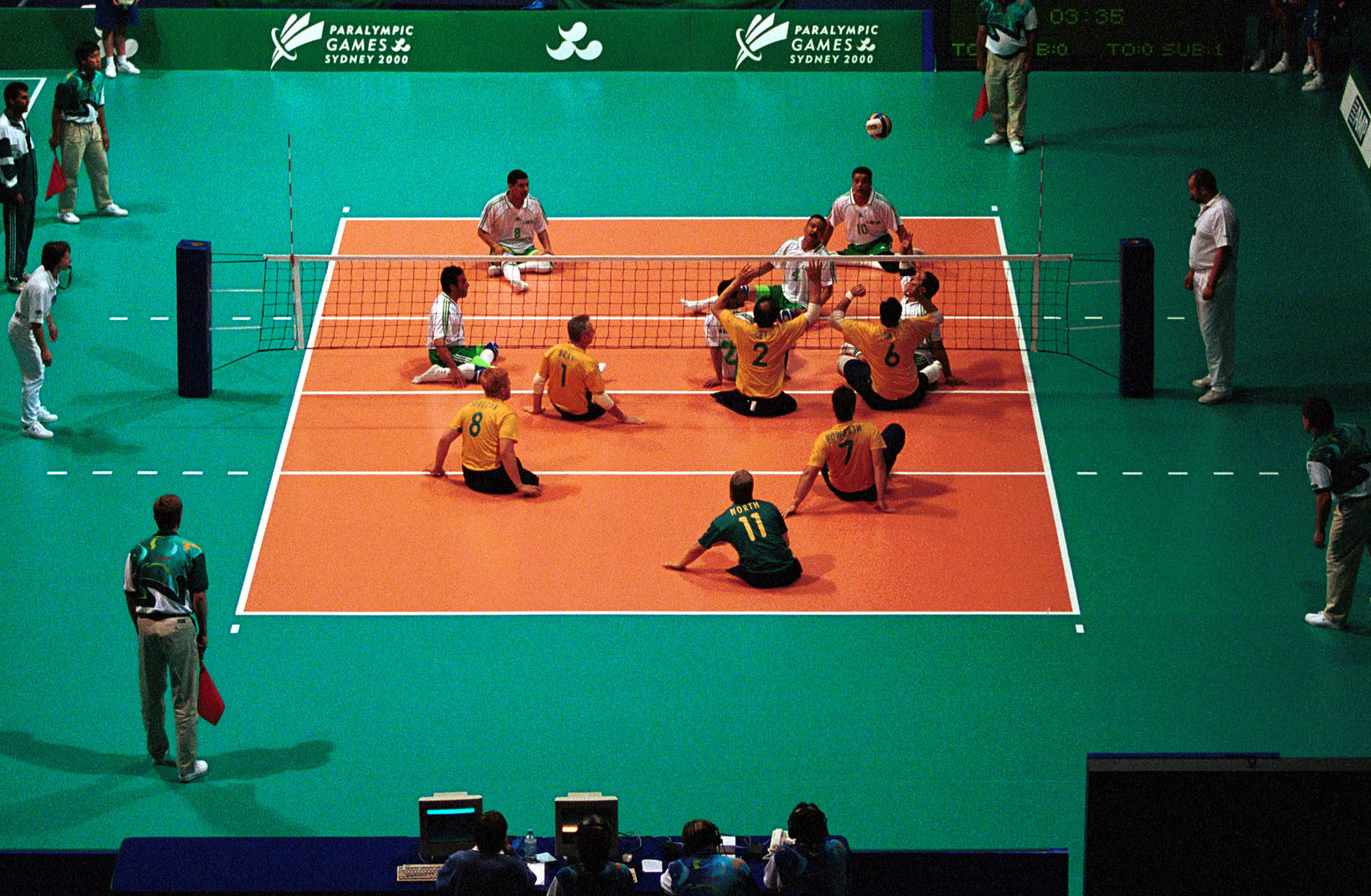
Australia versus Libya men's match at the 2000 Summer Paralympics in Sydney

Year	Gold	Silver	Bronze
1976	Netherlands	West Germany	Finland
1980	Netherlands	Sweden	Yugoslavia
1984	Netherlands	West Germany	Sweden
1988	Iran	Netherlands	Norway
1992	Iran	Netherlands	Germany
1996	Iran	Norway	Finland
2000	Iran	Bosnia and Herzegovina	Finland
2004	Bosnia and Herzegovina	Iran	Egypt
2008	Iran	Bosnia and Herzegovina	Russia
2012	Bosnia and Herzegovina	Iran	Germany
2016	Iran	Bosnia and Herzegovina	Egypt
2020	Iran	RPC	Bosnia and Herzegovina
2024	Iran	Bosnia and Herzegovina	Egypt

=== Standing ===
Men's standing volleyball medal winning for every Summer Games as follows:

Year	Gold	Silver	Bronze
1976	Israel	Great Britain	Finland
1980	Israel	Poland	West Germany
1984	Israel	West Germany	France
1988	West Germany	Israel	Poland
1992	Germany	Poland	Finland
1996	Germany	Slovakia	Poland
2000	Germany	Canada	Slovakia

=== Sitting ===
Women's sitting volleyball medal winning for every Summer Games as follows:

Year	Gold	Silver	Bronze
2004	China	Netherlands	United States
2008	China	United States	Netherlands
2012	China	United States	Ukraine
2016	United States	China	Brazil
2020	United States	China	Brazil
2024	United States	China	Canada

== Medals ==
Rank	Nation	Gold	Silver	Bronze	Total
1	Iran (IRI)	8	2	0	10
2	Netherlands (NED)	3	3	1	7
3	China (CHN)	3	3	0	6
4	United States (USA)	3	2	1	6
5	Israel (ISR)	3	1	0	4
6	Germany (GER)	3	0	2	5
7	Bosnia and Herzegovina (BIH)	2	4	1	7
8	West Germany (FRG)	1	3	1	5
9	Poland (POL)	0	2	2	4
10	Canada (CAN)	0	1	1	2
10	Norway (NOR)	0	1	1	2
10	Slovakia (SVK)	0	1	1	2
10	Sweden (SWE)	0	1	1	2
14	Great Britain (GBR)	0	1	0	1
14	RPC (RPC)	0	1	0	1
16	Finland (FIN)	0	0	4	4
17	Egypt (EGY)	0	0	3	3
18	Brazil (BRA)	0	0	2	2
19	Czechoslovakia (TCH)	0	0	1	1
19	France (FRA)	0	0	1	1
19	Russia (RUS)	0	0	1	1
19	Ukraine (UKR)	0	0	1	1
19	Yugoslavia (YUG)	0	0	1	1
Totals (23 entries)		26	26	26	78

== Ranking ==
=== Participating nations ===
Team	(Canada); 1976	(Netherlands); 1980	(United Kingdom); 1984	(South Korea); 1988	(Spain); 1992	(United States); 1996	(Australia); 2000	(Greece); 2004	(China); 2008	(United Kingdom); 2012	(Brazil); 2016	(Japan); 2020	(France); 2024
Netherlands	Gold medal	Gold medal	Gold medal	Silver medal	Silver medal	4th	5th	-	-	-	-	-	-
West Germany	Silver medal	-	Silver medal	6th	-	-	-	-	-	-	-	-	-
Finland	Bronze medal	4th	-	Silver medal	4th	Bronze medal	Bronze medal	5th	-	-	-	-	-
Sweden	-	Silver medal	Bronze medal	7th	7th	9th	-	-	-	-	-	-	-
Yugoslavia	-	Bronze medal	5th	4th	-	-	-	-	-	-	-	-	-
Norway	-	5th	6th	Bronze medal	5th	Silver medal	-	-	-	-	-	-	-
Egypt	-	6th	7th	9th	8th	6th	4th	Bronze medal	4th	5th	Bronze medal	5th	Bronze medal
Luxembourg	-	7th	-	-	-	-	-	-	-	-	-	-	-
United States	-	-	8th	10th	11th	11th	12th	6th	-	-	8th	-	-
Iran	-	-	-	Gold medal	Gold medal	Gold medal	Gold medal	Silver medal	Gold medal	Silver medal	Gold medal	Gold medal	Gold medal
Hungary	-	-	-	5th	6th	6th	8th	-	-	-	-	-	-
South Korea	-	-	-	8th	-	-	10th	-	-	-	-	-	-
Germany	-	-	-	-	Bronze medal	5th	6th	4th	-	Bronze medal	6th	6th	4th
Unified Team (EUN)	-	-	-	-	9th	-	-	-	-	-	-	-	-
Iraq	-	-	-	-	10th	-	-	-	7th	-	-	-	-
Spain	-	-	-	-	12th	-	-	-	-	-	-	-	-
Argentina	-	-	-	-	-	12th	-	-	-	-	-	-	-
Russia	-	-	-	-	-	10th	-	-	Bronze medal	4th	-	-	-
Ukraine	-	-	-	-	-	7th	-	-	-	-	5th	-	7th
Kazakhstan	-	-	-	-	-	8th	-	-	-	-	-	-	5th
Bosnia and Herzegovina	-	-	-	-	-	-	Silver medal	Gold medal	Silver medal	Gold medal	Silver medal	Bronze medal	Silver medal
Libya	-	-	-	-	-	-	7th	-	-	-	-	-	-
Japan	-	-	-	-	-	-	8th	7th	8th	8th	-	-	-
Australia	-	-	-	-	-	-	11th	-	-	-	-	-	-
Greece	-	-	-	-	-	-	-	8th	-	-	-	-	-
China	-	-	-	-	-	-	-	-	5th	7th	7th	7th	-
Brazil	-	-	-	-	-	-	-	-	6th	6th	4th	4th	6th
Great Britain	-	-	-	-	-	-	-	-	-	8th	-	-	-
Rwanda	-	-	-	-	-	-	-	-	-	9th	-	-	-
Morocco	-	-	-	-	-	-	-	-	-	10th	-	-	-
RPC (RPC)	-	-	-	-	-	-	-	-	-	-	-	Silver medal	-
France	-	-	-	-	-	-	-	-	-	-	-	-	8th
Total teams	3	7	8	10	12	12	12	8	8	10	8	8	8

=== Participating nations ===
Team	(Greece); 2004	(China); 2008	(United Kingdom); 2012	(Brazil); 2016	(Japan); 2020	(France); 2024
China	Gold medal	Gold medal	Gold medal	Silver medal	Silver medal	Silver medal
United States	Bronze medal	Silver medal	Silver medal	Gold medal	Gold medal	Gold medal
Netherlands	Silver medal	Bronze medal	4th	6th	-	-
Slovenia	4th	4th	6th	-	-	6th
Finland	5th	-	-	-	-	-
Ukraine	6th	5th	Bronze medal	4th	-	-
Japan	-	8th	7th	-	8th	-
Lithuania	-	6th	-	-	-	-
Latvia	-	7th	-	-	-	-
Brazil	-	-	5th	Bronze medal	Bronze medal	4th
Great Britain	-	-	7th	-	-	-
Canada	-	-	-	7th	4th	Bronze medal
Iran	-	-	-	5th	-	-
Rwanda	-	-	-	8th	7th	7th
RPC	-	-	-	-	5th	-
Italy	-	-	-	-	6th	5th
France	-	-	-	-	-	8th
Total teams	6	8	8	8	8	8

=== Participating nations ===
Team	(Canada); 1976	(Netherlands); 1980	(United States); 1984	(South Korea); 1988	(Spain); 1992	(United States); 1996	(Australia); 2000
Israel	Gold medal	Gold medal	Gold medal	Silver medal	Silver medal	6th	6th
Great Britain	Silver medal	4th	4th	5th	7th	7th	-
Finland	Bronze medal	-	-	-	-	-	-
Canada	4th	-	5th	-	-	-	Silver medal
Egypt	-	5th	-	-	-	-	
Poland	-	Silver medal	-	Bronze medal	-	Bronze medal	5th
West Germany	-	Bronze medal	Silver medal	Gold medal	-	-	-
France	-	-	Bronze medal	-	5th	5th	-
United States	-	-	6th	6th	4th	4th	4th
Myanmar	-	-	7th	-	-	-	-
South Korea	-	-	-	4th	-	-	-
Germany	-	-	-	-	Gold medal	Gold medal	Gold medal
Czechoslovakia	-	-	-	-	Bronze medal	-	-
Spain	-	-	-	-	8th	-	-
Slovakia	-	-	-	-	-	Silver medal	Bronze medal
Czech Republic	-	-	-	-	-	8th	-
Cambodia	-	-	-	-	-	-	7th
Australia	-	-	-	-	-	-	8th
Total teams	4	5	7	6	8	8	8

== Multi-medalists ==
Volleyball players who have won at least two gold medals. Athletes in bold are athletes who are still active.

No.	Athlete	Country	Years	Games	Gender	Gold	Silver	Bronze	Total	Source
1	**Isaa Zirahi**	Iran (IRI)	2000-2024	7	M	5	2	0	7	
2	**Davoud Alipourian**	Iran (IRI)	2004-2024	6	M	4	2	0	6	
3	**Ramezan Salehi Hajikolaei**	Iran (IRI)	2004-2024	6	M	4	2	0	6	
2	Ali Kashfia	Iran (IRI)	1988–2000	4	M	4	0	0	4	
3	Jalil Imeri	Iran (IRI)	1996-2012	5	M	3	2	0	5	
4	Ali Golkar	Iran (IRI)	1992-2004	4	M	3	1	0	4	
5	Hadi Rezaei	Iran (IRI)	1988-1996	3	M	3	0	0	3	
6	Ahmad Shivani	Iran (IRI)	1988-1996	3	M	3	0	0	3	
7	Parviz Firouzi	Iran (IRI)	1992-2000	3	M	3	0	0	3	
8	Ali Akbar Salavatian	Iran (IRI)	1992-2000	3	M	3	0	0	3	
9	Majid Soleimani	Iran (IRI)	1992-2000	3	M	3	0	0	3	
10	**Sabahudin Delalić**	Bosnia and Herzegovina (BIH)	2000-2016	5	M	2	3	0	5	
11	**Asim Medić**	Bosnia and Herzegovina (BIH)	2000-2016	5	M	2	3	0	5	
12	**Dževad Hamzić**	Bosnia and Herzegovina (BIH)	2000-2016	5	M	2	3	0	5	
13	**Adnan Manko**	Bosnia and Herzegovina (BIH)	2000-2016	5	M	2	3	0	5	
14	**Ismet Godinjak**	Bosnia and Herzegovina (BIH)	2000-2016	5	M	2	3	0	5	
15	Eliezer Kalina	Israel (ISR)	1976-1988	4	M	3	1	0	4	
16	Hagai Zamir	Israel (ISR)	1976-1988	4	M	3	1	0	4	
17	Igal Pazi	Israel (ISR)	1976-1980, 1988	3	M	2	1	0	3	
18	Johan Reekers	Netherlands (NED)	1980-1992	4	M	2	1	0	3	

== See also ==
- World ParaVolley
- World Para Volleyball Championship
- Volleyball at the Summer Olympics
- Women's European Sitting Volleyball Championships
- Men's European Sitting Volleyball Championships
