= List of flag bearers for Israel at the Paralympics =

Israel at the Paralympics
- IPC code: ISR
- NPC: Israel Paralympic Committee
- Website: www.isad.org.il
- Medals: Gold 0 Silver 0 Bronze 0 Total 0

Summer appearances
- 1960; 1964; 1968; 1972; 1976; 1980; 1984; 1988; 1992; 1996; 2000; 2004; 2008; 2012; 2016; 2020; 2024

Winter appearances
- 2022

This is a list of flag bearers who have represented Israel at the Paralympics

Event year	Season	Flag bearer	Sport
2016	Summer	Shraga Weinberg	Wheelchair tennis
2012	Summer	Doron Shaziri	Shooting
2008	Summer	Yizhar Cohen	Swimming

== See also ==
- List of flag bearers for Israel at the Olympics
