= Croatia men's national para volleyball teams =

The Croatia national sitting volleyball team represents Croatia in international sitting volleyball competitions and friendly matches. It is controlled by the Croatian Sitting Volleyball Federation.

== Sitting volleyball ==
=== Competitive record ===
==== Paralympic Games ====
Year	Round	Position	GP	W	L	SW	SL
(Canada) ( (Germany) ) 1976	Part of Yugoslavia. Yugoslavia qualified 3 times.						
(Netherlands) 1980	Part of Yugoslavia. Yugoslavia qualified 3 times.						
(United Kingdom) (United States) 1984	Part of Yugoslavia. Yugoslavia qualified 3 times.						
(South Korea) 1988	Part of Yugoslavia. Yugoslavia qualified 3 times.						
(Spain) 1992	Could not qualify.						
(United States) 1996	Did not qualify.						
(Australia) 2000	Did not qualify.						
(Greece) 2004	Did not qualify.						
(China) 2008	Did not qualify.						
(United Kingdom) 2012	Did not qualify.						
(Brazil) 2016	Did not qualify.						
(Japan) 2020	Did not qualify.						
(France) 2024	Did not qualify.						
Total	Qualified: 0/8						

==== World Championship ====
Year	Round	Position	GP	W	L	SW	SL
(Netherlands) 1983	Part of Yugoslavia. Yugoslavia qualified 4 times.						
(Norway) 1985	Part of Yugoslavia. Yugoslavia qualified 4 times.						
(Hungary) 1986	Part of Yugoslavia. Yugoslavia qualified 4 times.						
(United States) 1989	Part of Yugoslavia. Yugoslavia qualified 4 times.						
(Netherlands) 1990	Part of Yugoslavia. Yugoslavia qualified 4 times.						
(Germany) 1994							
(Iran) 1998							
(Egypt) 2002							
(Netherlands) 2006		7th of 12					
(United States) 2010		9th of 21					
(Poland) 2014		11th of 16					
(Netherlands) 2018		13th of 16					
(Bosnia and Herzegovina) 2022		10th of 16	7	2	5	8	15
(China) 2026		11th of 16	7	2	5	7	16
Total	Qualified: 6/9						

==== European Championship ====
Year	Round	Position	GP	W	L	SW	SL
(Germany) 1981	Part of Yugoslavia. Yugoslavia qualified 4 times.						
(Netherlands) 1983	Part of Yugoslavia. Yugoslavia qualified 4 times.						
(Norway) 1985	Part of Yugoslavia. Yugoslavia qualified 4 times.						
(Socialist Federal Republic of Yugoslavia) 1987	Part of Yugoslavia. Yugoslavia qualified 4 times.						
(United Kingdom) 1991							
(Finland) 1993							
(Slovenia) 1995							
(Estonia) 1997							
(Bosnia and Herzegovina) 1999							
(Hungary) 2001							
(Finland) 2003		9th of 12					
(Germany) 2005		4th of 12					
(Hungary) 2007		6th of 12					
(Poland) 2009		7th of 11					
(Netherlands) 2011		8th of 11					
(Poland) 2013		7th of 13					
(Germany) 2015		8th of 12					
(Croatia) 2017		4th of 13					
(Hungary) 2019		5th of 12					
(Turkey) 2021		6th of 16	7	4	3	14	11
(Italy) 2023		5th of 12	8	5	3	19	10
(Hungary) 2025		5th of 12	8	4	4	15	13
Total	Qualified: /15						
