= Gad Lanzer =

Israeli Paralympic volleyball player (born 1944)

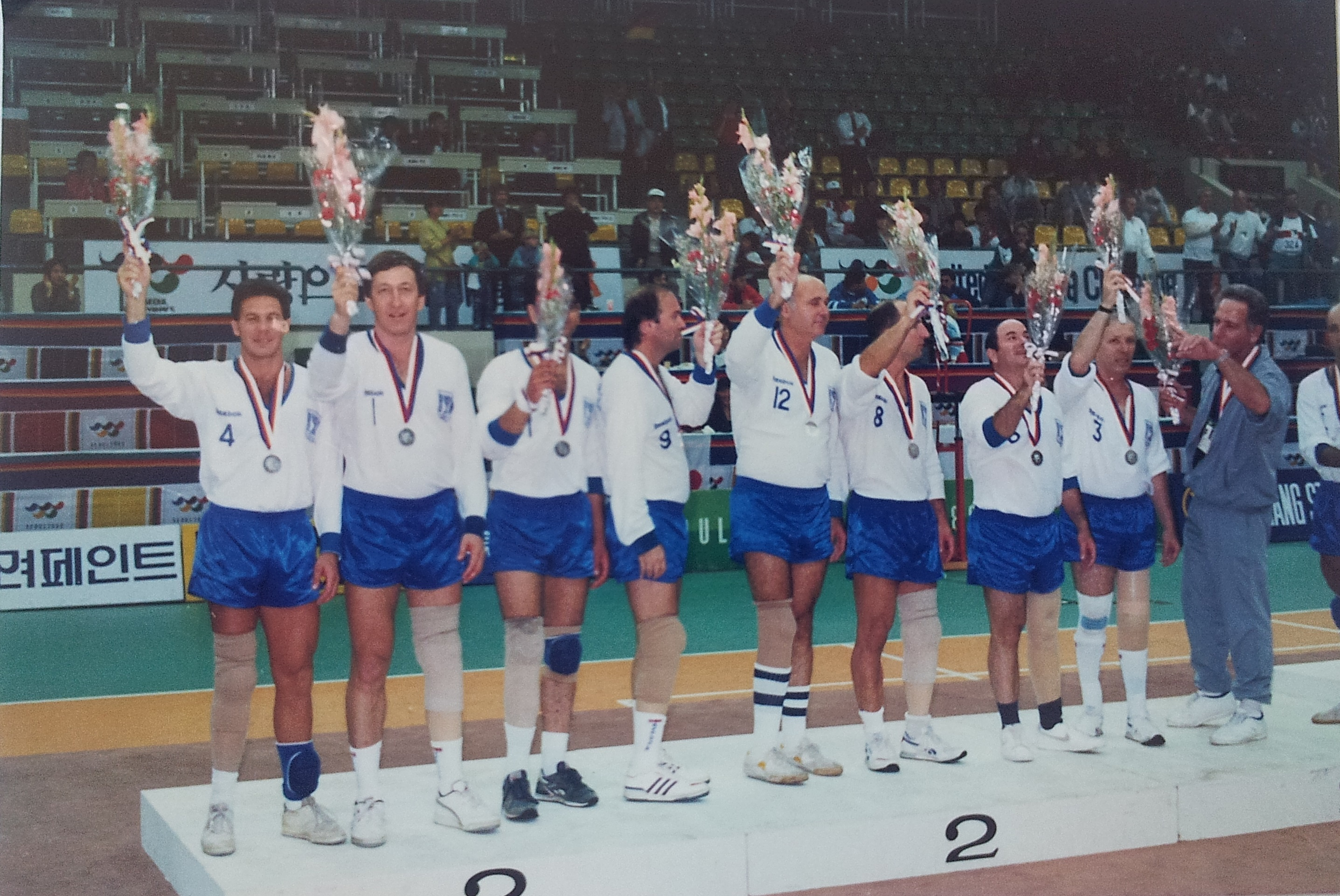
- Israeli volleyball team at the 1988 Seoul Paralympic Games

Personal information
- Native name: גד לנצר
- Born: 1944 (age 81–82)
Medal record
Event / 1st / 2nd / 3rd; Paralympic Games / 1 / 1 / 0
Representing Israel
Paralympic Games
Men's volleyball
Gold medal – first place	1976 Toronto	Volleyball - standing
Silver medal – second place	1988 Seoul	Volleyball - standing

Gad Lanzer (Hebrew: גד לנצר; born 1944) competed for Israel in the men's standing volleyball events at the 1976 Summer Paralympics, 1988 Summer Paralympics, and 1992 Summer Paralympics, as well as competing in para swimming at the 1976 Games.

As a member of the Israeli team, he won a gold medal in 1976 and a silver medal in 1988.

== See also ==
- Israel at the 1976 Summer Paralympics
- Israel at the 1988 Summer Paralympics
- Israel at the 1992 Summer Paralympics
