= Roni Fradkin =

Israeli Paralympic volleyball player and athlete

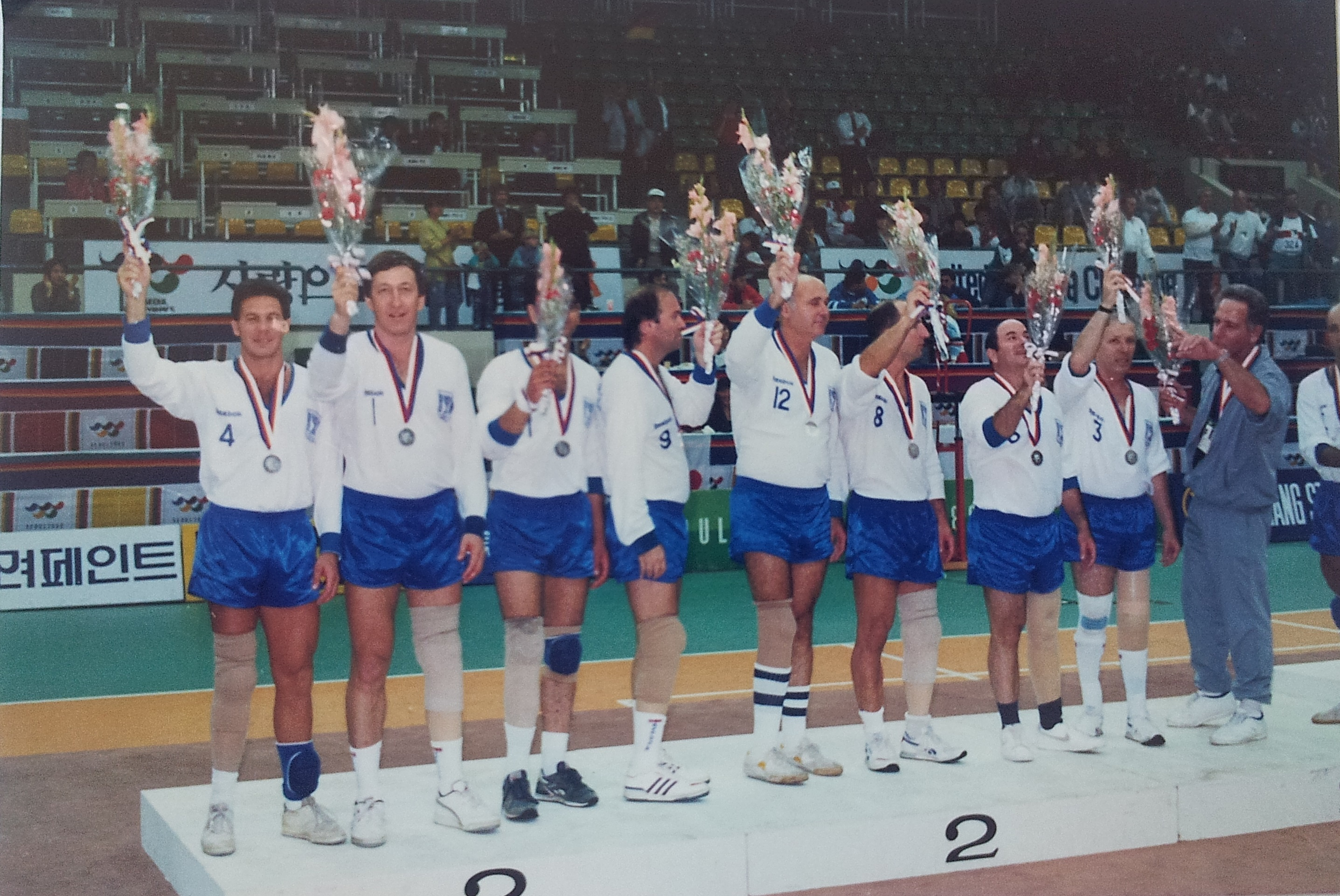
- Israeli volleyball team at the 1988 Seoul Paralympic Games

Personal information
- Native name: רוני פרדקין
Medal record
Event / 1st / 2nd / 3rd; Paralympic Games / 4 / 2 / 0
Representing Israel
Paralympic Games
Men's volleyball
Gold medal – first place	1976 Toronto	Volleyball - standing
Gold medal – first place	1980 Arnhem	Volleyball - standing
Gold medal – first place	1984 New York	Volleyball - standing
Silver medal – second place	1988 Seoul	Volleyball - standing
Men's para athletics
Gold medal – first place	1976 Toronto	Long jump C
Silver medal – second place	1976 Toronto	High jump C

Roni Fradkin (Hebrew: רוני פרדקין) competed for Israel in men's standing volleyball at the 1976 Summer Paralympics, 1980 Summer Paralympics, 1984 Summer Paralympics and 1988 Summer Paralympics. As a member of the Israeli team, he won gold medals in 1976, 1980, and 1984 and a silver medal in 1988.

He also competed in athletics at the 1976 Summer Paralympics, winning a gold medal in the men's long jump C event and a silver in the men's high jump C event.

== See also ==
- Israel at the 1976 Summer Paralympics
- Israel at the 1980 Summer Paralympics
- Israel at the 1984 Summer Paralympics
- Israel at the 1988 Summer Paralympics
