= Aharon Danziger =

Israeli Paralympic volleyball player, athlete, and swimmer

Personal information
- Native name: אהרון דנציגר
Medal record
Event / 1st / 2nd / 3rd; Paralympic Games / 4 / 0 / 0
Representing Israel
Paralympic Games
Men's volleyball
Gold medal – first place	1976 Toronto	Volleyball - standing
Gold medal – first place	1980 Arnhem	Volleyball - standing
Gold medal – first place	1984 New York	Volleyball - standing
Men's para athletics
Gold medal – first place	1976 Toronto	100m - C

Aharon Danziger (Hebrew: אהרון דנציגר) is an Israeli volleyball player, who competed for Israel in men's standing volleyball at the 1976 Summer Paralympics, the 1980 Summer Paralympics, the 1984 Summer Paralympics, and the 1992 Summer Paralympics. As a member of the Israeli team, he won gold medals in 1976, 1980, and 1984.

He also competed in men's para athletics and para swimming events at the 1976 Summer Paralympics, winning a gold medal in the men's 100 m C event, finishing 5th in the high jump C event, 7th in the 100 m breaststroke C event, 13th in the javelin throw C event, and 14th in long jump C event. At the 1980 Summer Paralympics, he competed the men's 100 m C event but did not reach the final round.

== See also ==
- Israel at the 1976 Summer Paralympics
- Israel at the 1980 Summer Paralympics
- Israel at the 1984 Summer Paralympics
- Israel at the 1992 Summer Paralympics
