= Shlomo Borenshtein =

Israeli Paralympic volleyball player

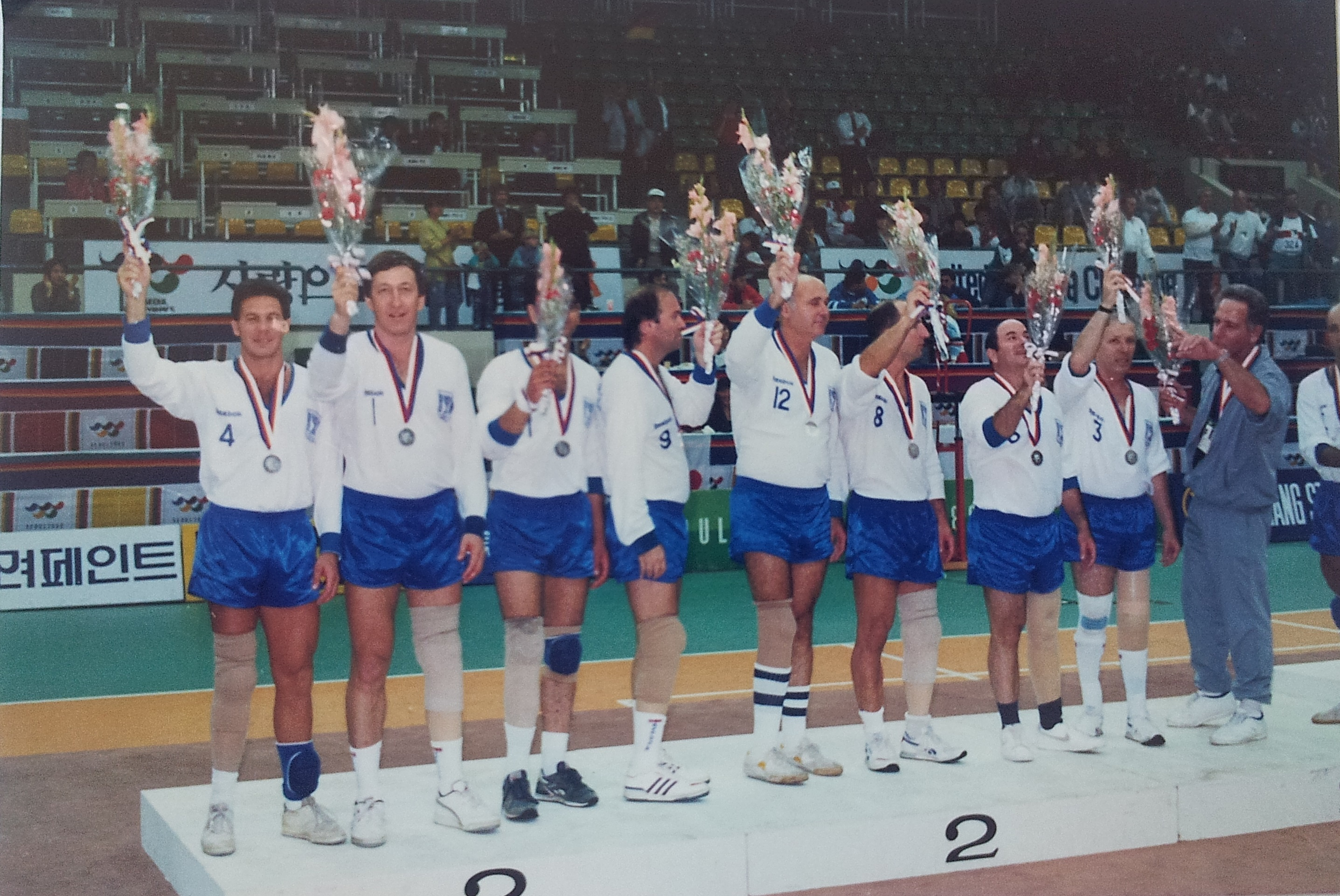
- Israeli volleyball team at the 1988 Seoul Paralympic Games

Personal information
- Native name: שלמה בורנשטיין
Medal record
Event / 1st / 2nd / 3rd; Paralympic Games / 1 / 1 / 0
Men's volleyball
Representing Israel
Paralympic Games
Gold medal – first place	1984 New York	Volleyball - standing
Silver medal – second place	1988 Seoul	Volleyball - standing

Shlomo Borenshtein (Hebrew: שלמה בורנשטיין) competed for Israel in the men's standing volleyball events at the 1984 Summer Paralympics and 1988 Summer Paralympics. As a member of the Israeli team, he won a gold medal in 1984 and a silver medal in 1988.

== See also ==
- Israel at the 1984 Summer Paralympics
- Israel at the 1988 Summer Paralympics
