= Israel at the 1996 Summer Paralympics =

- IPC code: ISR
- NPC: Israel Paralympic Committee
- Website: www.isad.org.il

in Atlanta
- Competitors: 40 (37 men and 3 women)
- Medals Ranked 52nd: Gold 0 Silver 4 Bronze 5 Total 9

Summer Paralympics appearances (overview)
- 1960; 1964; 1968; 1972; 1976; 1980; 1984; 1988; 1992; 1996; 2000; 2004; 2008; 2012; 2016; 2020; 2024

40 athletes (37 men and 3 women) from Israel competed at the 1996 Summer Paralympics in Atlanta, United States.

== Medalists ==
Medal	Name	Sport	Event
Silver	Nachman Wolf	Athletics	Men's discus F41
Silver	Doron Shaziri	Shooting	Men's free rifle 3x40 SH1
Silver	Doron Shaziri	Shooting	Mixed English match SH1
Silver	Izhar Cohen	Swimming	Men's 50m freestyle B1
Bronze	Itzhak Baranes	Lawn bowls	Men's singles LB6
Bronze	Tami Carmeli	Lawn bowls	Women's singles LB6
Bronze	Ziv Better	Swimming	Men's 50m freestyle B2
Bronze	Ziv Better	Swimming	Men's 100m backstroke B2
Bronze	Ziv Better	Swimming	Men's 100m freestyle B2

== Athletes ==
- Athletics: Ziv Bar-Shira, Yogev Kenzi, Nachman Wolf
- Equestrianism: Uri Basha, Sivan Mor, Eyal Shachar, Itai Zuck
- Lawn bowls: Itzhak Baranes, Tami Carmeli, Akiva Farber
- Shooting: Yehoram Ben-Haim, Eli Chabara, Avraham Hadasi, Doron Shaziri
- Swimming: Shlomi Ayger, Ziv Better, Ron Bolotin, Hanoch Budin, Yizhar Cohen, Uriel Mozes, Eran Shemesh
- Table tennis: Shlomo Aharoni, Eliyahu Atiya, Zeev Glikman, Sagi Zuckerman
- Volleyball: Ronen Avivi, Yair Ben-Dor, Jaime Fayntuch, Nissim Franco, Gil Haba, Eliezer Kalina, Zvi Karsh, Chen Tzur, Hagai Zamir
- Weightlifting: Baruch Masami, Dotan Meishar
- Wheelchair tennis: Tikva Aharoni, Gill Naor, Eyal Sartov, Kinneret Wallach
