= Moshe Barbalat =

Israeli Paralympic athlete

Personal information
- Native name: משה ברבלט
- Born: 1932 (age 93–94)
Medal record
Event / 1st / 2nd / 3rd; Paralympic Games / 3 / 0 / 2
Representing Israel
Paralympic Games
Men's volleyball
Gold medal – first place	1976 Toronto	Volleyball - standing
Gold medal – first place	1980 Arnhem	Volleyball - standing
Gold medal – first place	1984 New York	Volleyball - standing
Men's para athletics
Bronze medal – third place	1976 New York	Shot put C1
Bronze medal – third place	1976 New York	Discus throw C1

Moshe Barbalat (Hebrew: משה ברבלט; born 1932) is a retired Israeli Paralympic athlete and decorated war hero.

Barbalat was born in Romania and immigrated to Mandatory Palestine in 1947. In 1950, he was drafted into the Israel Defense Forces and served in the Armored Corps. He was discharged from active service in 1952 but continued to serve in the reserves. He fought in the Suez Crisis in 1956 and on the Sinai front of the Six-Day War in 1967. In 1968, he was severely wounded in the Battle of Karameh when his armored personnel carrier was hit by two shells and he lost both of his legs. While badly injured and still under fire, he demanded that other wounded soldiers be evacuated before he was, and for this was awarded the Medal of Distinguished Service in 1973.

After a period of recovery, Barbalat began sport training at the Beit Halochem rehabilitation center for disabled veterans in Tel Aviv. He competed for Israel and won gold medals in the men's standing volleyball events at the 1976 Summer Paralympics, the 1980 Summer Paralympics, and the 1984 Summer Paralympics.

He also competed in men's para athletics events. At the 1976 Summer Paralympics, he won bronze medals in the shot put C1 event and the discus throw C1 event, finished 8th in the javelin throw C1 event, and 9th in the precision javelin C1 event. At the 1980 Summer Paralympics, he finished 6th in the discus throw C1 event and 9th in the shot put C1 event.

== See also ==
- Israel at the 1976 Summer Paralympics
- Israel at the 1980 Summer Paralympics
- Israel at the 1984 Summer Paralympics
