= Zvi Karsh =

Israeli Paralympic volleyball player and athlete

Personal information
- Native name: צבי קארש
Medal record
Event / 1st / 2nd / 3rd; Paralympic Games / 2 / 2 / 0
Representing Israel
Paralympic Games
Men's volleyball
Gold medal – first place	1980 Arnhem	Volleyball - standing
Gold medal – first place	1984 New York	Volleyball - standing
Silver medal – second place	1988 Seoul	Volleyball - standing
Men's para athletics
Silver medal – second place	1980 Arnhem	Shot put C

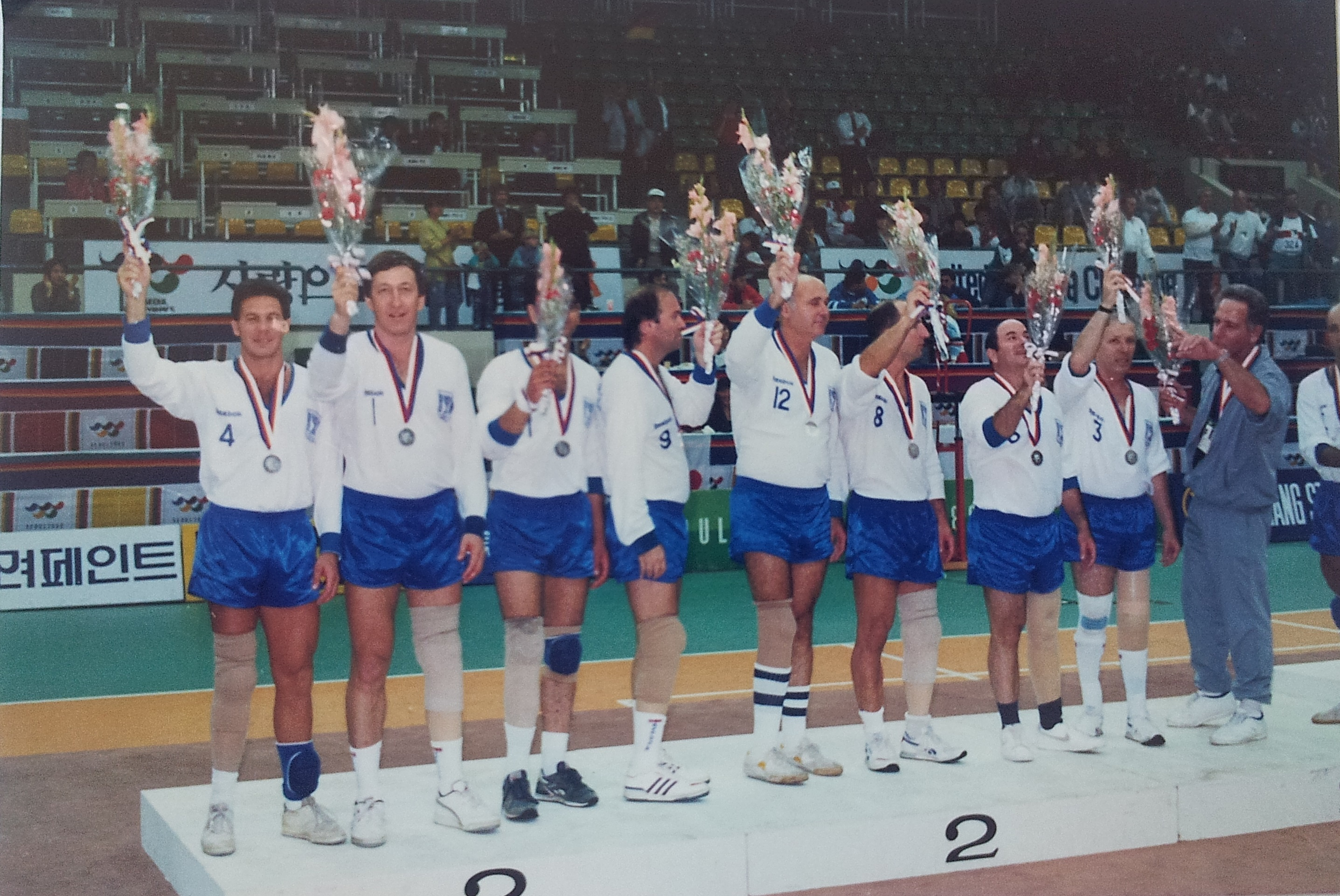
Silver medal to Israel. 1988 Seoul Paralympic Games

Zvi Karsh (Hebrew: צבי קארש) competed for Israel in men's standing volleyball at the 1980 Summer Paralympics, 1984 Summer Paralympics, 1988 Summer Paralympics, and 1992 Summer Paralympics. As a member of the Israeli team, he won gold medals in 1980 and 1984 and a silver medal in 1988.

He also competed in men's para athletics events, winning a silver medal in the shot put C event at the 1980 Summer Paralympics and placing 9th in the shot put A4 event at the 1984 Summer Paralympics.

== See also ==
- Israel at the 1980 Summer Paralympics
- Israel at the 1984 Summer Paralympics
- Israel at the 1988 Summer Paralympics
- Israel at the 1992 Summer Paralympics
