= Nitzan Atzmon =

Israeli Paralympic volleyball player and athlete

Personal information
- Native name: ניצן עצמון
Medal record
Event / 1st / 2nd / 3rd; Paralympic Games / 4 / 1 / 1
Representing Israel
Paralympic Games
Men's volleyball
Gold medal – first place	1976 Toronto	Volleyball - standing
Gold medal – first place	1980 Arnhem	Volleyball - standing
Gold medal – first place	1984 New York	Volleyball - standing
Men's para athletics
Gold medal – first place	1976 Toronto	High jump F
Silver medal – second place	1976 Toronto	Long jump F
Bronze medal – third place	1980 Arnhem	High jump F

Nitzan Atzmon (Hebrew: ניצן עצמון) competed for Israel and won gold medals in the men's standing volleyball events at the 1976 Summer Paralympics, the 1980 Summer Paralympics, and the 1984 Summer Paralympics.

He also competed in men's para athletics events. At the 1976 Summer Paralympics, he won a gold medal in the high jump F event and a silver medal in the long jump F event. At the 1980 Summer Paralympics, he won a bronze medal in the high jump F event.

== See also ==
- Israel at the 1976 Summer Paralympics
- Israel at the 1980 Summer Paralympics
- Israel at the 1984 Summer Paralympics
