= Eliyahu Unger =

Israeli Paralympic volleyball player

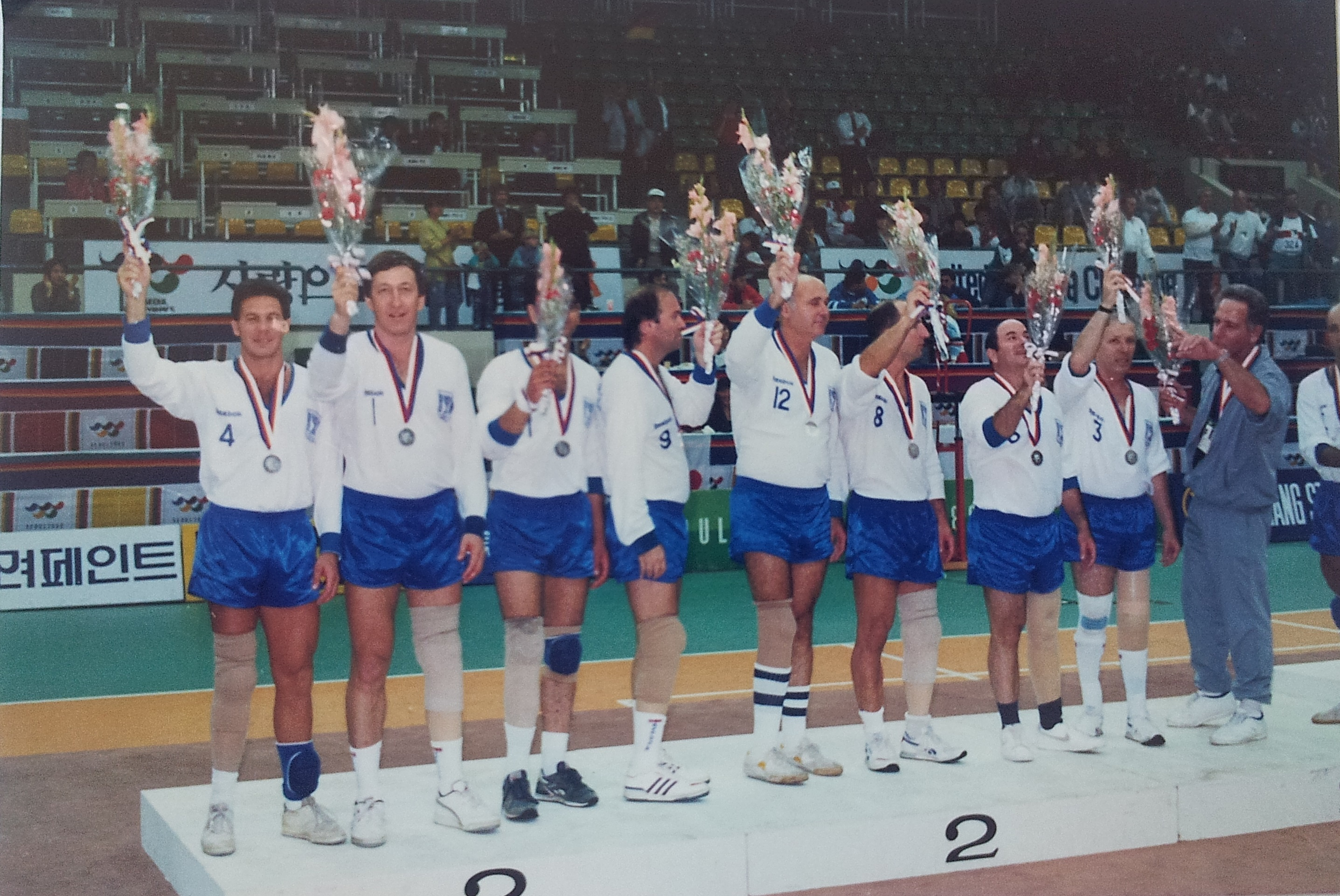
- Israeli volleyball team at the 1988 Seoul Paralympic Games

Personal information
- Native name: אליהו אונגר
Medal record
Event / 1st / 2nd / 3rd; Paralympic Games / 2 / 1 / 0
Representing Israel
Paralympic Games
Men's volleyball
Gold medal – first place	1980 Arnhem	Volleyball - standing
Gold medal – first place	1984 New York	Volleyball - standing
Silver medal – second place	1988 Seoul	Volleyball - standing

Eliyahu Unger (Hebrew: אליהו אונגר) competed for Israel in men's standing volleyball at the 1980 Summer Paralympics, 1984 Summer Paralympics, and 1988 Summer Paralympics. As a member of the Israeli team, he won gold medals in 1980 and 1984 and a silver medal in 1988.

== See also ==
- Israel at the 1980 Summer Paralympics
- Israel at the 1984 Summer Paralympics
- Israel at the 1988 Summer Paralympics
