= Eyal Gur =

Israeli Paralympic volleyball player

Personal information
- Native name: אייל גור
Medal record
Men's volleyball
Representing Israel
Paralympic Games
Silver medal – second place	1988 Seoul	Volleyball - standing

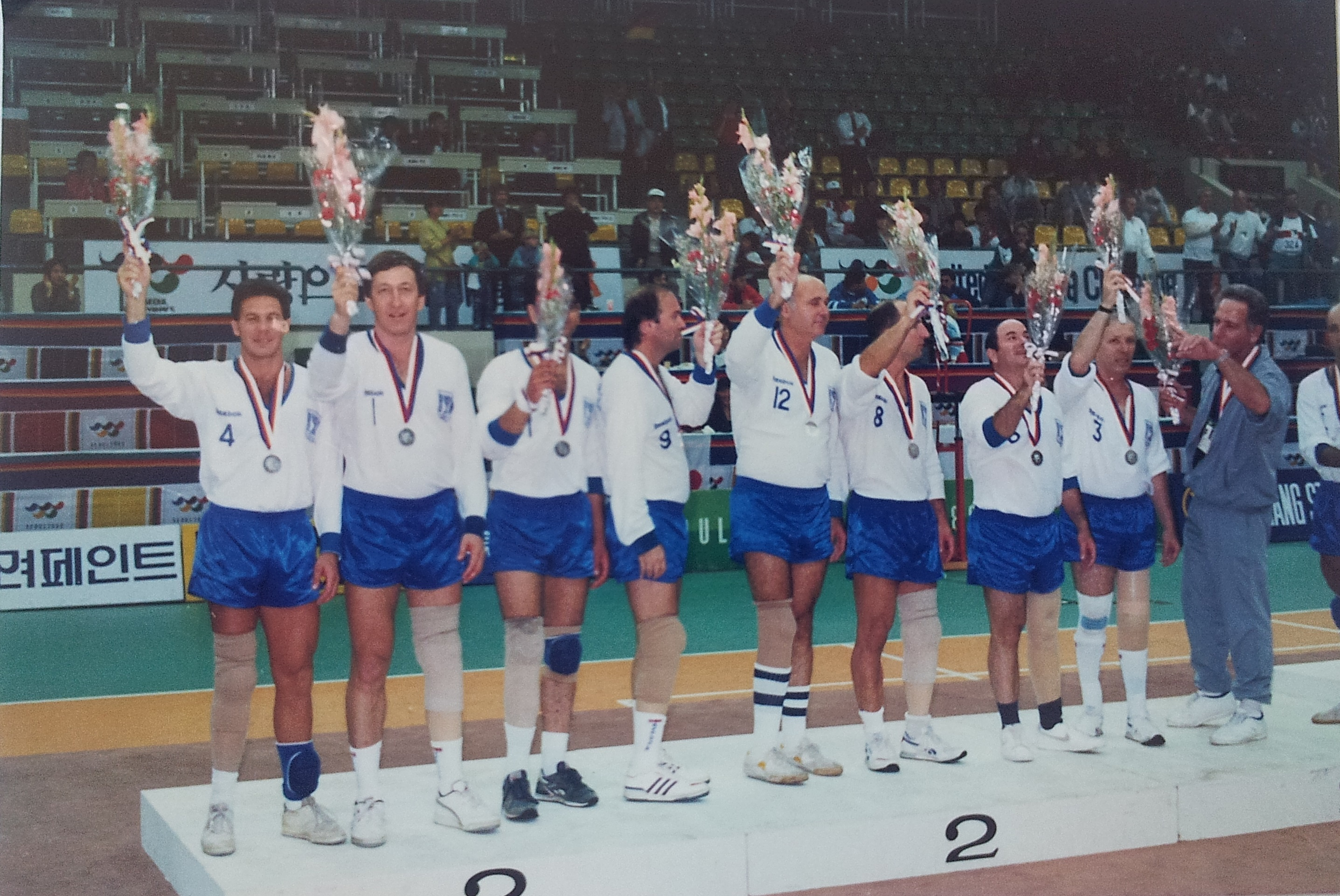
Silver medal to Israel. 1988 Seoul Paralympic Games

Eyal Gur (Hebrew: אייל גור) competed for Israel in the men's standing volleyball events at the 1988 Summer Paralympics and 1992 Summer Paralympics. As a member of the Israeli team, he won a silver medal in 1988.

== See also ==
- Israel at the 1988 Summer Paralympics
- Israel at the 1992 Summer Paralympics
