= Janusz Klos =

Polish Paralympic volleyball player

Medal record
Men's volleyball
Representing Poland
Paralympic Games
Bronze medal – third place	1988 Seoul	Volleyball - standing
Silver medal – second place	1992 Barcelona	Volleyball - standing

Janusz Klos competed for Poland in the men's standing volleyball events at the 1988 Summer Paralympics (bronze medal), the 1992 Summer Paralympics (silver medal), and the 2000 Summer Paralympics.

== See also ==
- Poland at the 1988 Summer Paralympics
- Poland at the 1992 Summer Paralympics
- Poland at the 2000 Summer Paralympics
