= Volleyball at the 1988 Summer Paralympics =

Volleyball at the VIII Paralympic Games
- Paralympic standing and sitting volleyball
- Venue: KBS Arena (sitting) and Hanyang University Gymnasium (standing)

Medalists
1st place, gold medalist(s)		West Germany (FRG) (standing); Iran (IRI) (sitting)
2nd place, silver medalist(s)		Israel (ISR) (standing); Netherlands (NED) (sitting)
3rd place, bronze medalist(s)		Poland (POL) (standing); Norway (NOR) (sitting)

Paralympic symbol (1988-1994)

Volleyball at the 1988 Summer Paralympics in Seoul consisted of standing and sitting volleyball events for men.

== Medal summary ==
Event	Gold	Silver	Bronze
Men's standing	West Germany (FRG); Rudolf Durrer; Josef Giebel; Bernd Heinrich; Manfred Kohl; Thomas Kruska; Anton Probst; Karl Quade; Rudolf Schietering; Siegmund Soicke; Karl-Josef Weißenfels	Israel (ISR); Shlomo Borenshtein; Roni Fradkin; Eyal Gur; Eliezer Kalina; Zvi Karsh; Gad Lanzer; Yigal Pazi; Eliyahu Unger; Hagai Zamir	Poland (POL); Zbigniew Czochara; Jerzy Dabrowski; Andrzej Iwaniak; Janusz Klos; Janusz Kobik; Jerzy Kruszelnicki; Stanislaw Leja; Kazimierz Robert; Maciej Wroblewski
Men's sitting	Iran (IRI); Mohsen Barati Sarbandi Toro; Mohammad Reza Bodagi; Kazem Esmalyan Nikravesh; Reza Gozali; Saiid Hanifi-Hargelan; Hossein Hashemi Asl; Ali Kashfia; Mohammad Mostafavi-Torbati; Mohammad Ho Parastar Harami; Hadi Rezaei; Ahmad Shivani Mahjori; Mohammad-Ali Tabatabaii	Netherlands (NED); Herman Bernenschot; Henk Bolthuis; Harry Domen; Addi Dost; Henk Dost; Gerard Kroon; J. Milcerhdt; Alfred Oonk; Herman Ravier; Pieter Top; Willem van Laar; Andre Venderbosch	Norway (NOR); Knut Olav Brathen; Erik Halvorsen; Ole Hodnemyr; Geir Kjolsrud; Geir Kvarsvik; Kaare Lyse; Lars Moller Jensen; Oeivind Olsen; Per Willy Ormestad; Gaute Rostrup

== Medal table ==
Rank	Nation	Gold	Silver	Bronze	Total
1	Iran (IRI)	1	0	0	1
1	West Germany (FRG)	1	0	0	1
3	Israel (ISR)	0	1	0	1
3	Netherlands (NED)	0	1	0	1
5	Norway (NOR)	0	0	1	1
5	Poland (POL)	0	0	1	1
Totals (6 entries)		2	2	2	6

== Men's standing volleyball team rosters ==
Source: International Paralympic Committee

Great Britain (GBR): Peter Barnes; Frederick Church; Gerry Dillon; John Fisher; Kenneth Greatbatch; John McLeod; Robert Morrish; Iain Park; Jason Williams; Anthony Willis	Israel (ISR): Shlomo Borenshtein; Roni Fradkin; Eyal Gur; Eliezer Kalina; Zvi Karsh; Gad Lanzer; Yigal Pazi; Eliyahu Unger; Hagai Zamir	Poland (POL): Zbigniew Czochara; Jerzy Dabrowski; Andrzej Iwaniak; Janusz Klos; Janusz Kobik; Jerzy Kruszelnicki; Stanislaw Leja; Kazimierz Robert; Maciej Wroblewski	South Korea (KOR): Jae Hoon Choi; Young Choi; Hong Sik Jung; Jung Chung Lee; Jung Ho Lee; Moon Ha Lee; Won Suk Lee; Hak Hoon Moon; Sang Kwon Park; Soo Min Park
United States (USA): Ronnie Alsup; Paul Bodenbach; Robert Crawford; Barry Hammer; Gary Parke; Mick Savage	West Germany (FRG): Rudolf Durrer; Josef Giebel; Bernd Heinrich; Manfred Kohl; Thomas Kruska; Anton Probst; Karl Quade; Rudolf Schietering; Siegmund Soicke; Karl-Josef Weißenfels		

== Men's sitting volleyball team rosters ==
Source: International Paralympic Committee

Egypt (EGY): Abdel Latif Fara Abdel Latif; Ehab Mohamed Ahmed; Hassan Aboulla Aly; Ahmedabdou Ed Amin; Mohamed Ahmed Amin; Khalid Abdelfattah Biomi; Salah Mohamed Hamdy; Essam Eldin Ragab Hamid; Adel Hassan; Amin Ibrahim; Khalid Ahmed Mousa; Emad Mahmod Ramadan	Hungary (HUN): Imre Balogh; Sandor Budai; Jozsef Czimmermann; Imre Czink; Andras Domokos; Miklos Kekecs; Sandor Locsei; Andras Paczulak; Csaba Polcz; Lajos Szecsenyi	Iran (IRI): Mohsen Barati Sarbandi Toro; Mohammad Reza Bodagi; Kazem Esmalyan Nikravesh; Reza Gozali; Saiid Hanifi-Hargelan; Hossein Hashemi Asl; Ali Kashfia; Mohammad Mostafavi-Torbati; Mohammad Ho Parastar Harami; Hadi Rezaii-Gorgani; Ahmad Shivani Mahjori; Mohammad-Ali Tabatabaii	Netherlands (NED): Herman Bernenschot; Henk Bolthuis; Harry Domen; Addi Dost; Henk Dost; Gerard Kroon; J. Milcerhdt; Alfred Oonk; Herman Ravier; Pieter Top; Willem van Laar; Andre Venderbosch
Norway (NOR): Knut Olav Brathen; Erik Halvorsen; Ole Hodnemyr; Geir Kjolsrud; Geir Kvarsvik; Kaare Lyse; Lars Moller Jensen; Oeivind Olsen; Per Willy Ormestad; Gaute Rostrup	South Korea (KOR): Soo Nam Cho; In Sung Chun; Duk Chan Kang; Jae Jin Kim; Ki Ho Kim; Jong Bok Koh; Ik Tae Kwon; Jung Cho Lee; Hyun Dong Park; In Ok Roh; Dong Koo Shin; Cheol Ho Yun	Sweden (SWE): Hans Bergsten; Hakan Byberg; Hasse Elten; Sven Eryd; Sven Hansson; Bengt-Gosta Johansson; Sten-Ivar Larsson; Tommy Larsson; Olle Tjarnberg; Anders Widelund	United States (USA): Thomas Allred; Richard Bryant; Matthew Bulow; Lee Montgomery; Robert Thomas Pearson; Scott Schneider; Eric Strezdek; Al Williams
West Germany (FRG): Rolf Elbrachter; Jens Faerber; Jorg Gatje; Bert Jasper; Ulrich Jung; Michael Konrad; Gunther Kruger; Rudiger Rossner; Frank Spremberg; Jurgen Wessel	Yugoslavia (YUG): Joze Banfi; Vlado Homan; Davorin Kragelanik; Jovica Mitrovic; Sefko Nuhanovic; Obren Pejcic; Zoran Stojanovic; Milan Zivic		
