= Poland at the 1976 Summer Paralympics =

- IPC code: POL
- NPC: Polish Paralympic Committee
- Website: www.paralympic.org.pl

in Toronto
- Medals Ranked 7th: Gold 24 Silver 17 Bronze 12 Total 53

Summer Paralympics appearances (overview)
- 1972; 1976; 1980; 1984; 1988; 1992; 1996; 2000; 2004; 2008; 2012; 2016; 2020; 2024

Poland sent a delegation to compete at the 1976 Summer Paralympics in Toronto, Canada. Its athletes finished seventh in the overall medal count.

== See also ==
- 1976 Summer Paralympics
- Poland at the 1976 Summer Olympics
