= Jerzy Dabrowski (disambiguation) =

Jerzy Dabrowski may refer to:

- Jerzy Dąbrowski (1899–1967), Polish aeronautical engineer
- Jerzy Dąbrowski (lieutenant colonel) (1889–1940), Polish resistance member
- Jerzy Dabrowski (volleyball), Polish Paralympic volleyball player and athlete
