= Zbigniew Czochara =

Polish Paralympic volleyball player

Medal record
Men's volleyball
Representing Poland
Paralympic Games
Bronze medal – third place	1988 Seoul	Volleyball - standing

Zbigniew Czochara competed for Poland in the men's standing volleyball event at the 1988 Summer Paralympics, where he won a bronze medal.

== See also ==
- Poland at the 1988 Summer Paralympics
