= Poland at the Paralympics =

- IPC code: POL
- NPC: Polish Paralympic Committee
- Website: www.paralympic.org.pl
- Medals: Gold 288 Silver 278 Bronze 257 Total 823

Summer appearances
- 1972; 1976; 1980; 1984; 1988; 1992; 1996; 2000; 2004; 2008; 2012; 2016; 2020; 2024

Winter appearances
- 1976; 1980; 1984; 1988; 1992; 1994; 1998; 2002; 2006; 2010; 2014; 2018; 2022; 2026

Poland first participated at the Paralympic Games in 1972.

Polish athletes have won a total of 823 medals. Poland is tenth on the all-time Paralympic Games medal table.

== Medal tables ==
=== Medals by Summer Games ===
| Games | Gold | Silver | Bronze | Total |
|---|---|---|---|---|
| 1972 Heidelberg | 14 | 12 | 7 | 33 |
| 1976 Toronto | 24 | 17 | 12 | 53 |
| 1980 Arnhem | 75 | 50 | 52 | 177 |
| 1984 Stoke Mandeville 1984 New York | 46 | 39 | 21 | 106 |
| 1988 Seoul | 23 | 25 | 33 | 81 |
| 1992 Barcelona | 10 | 12 | 10 | 32 |
| 1996 Atlanta | 13 | 14 | 8 | 35 |
| 2000 Sydney | 19 | 22 | 12 | 53 |
| 2004 Athens | 10 | 25 | 19 | 54 |
| 2008 Beijing | 5 | 12 | 13 | 30 |
| 2012 London | 14 | 13 | 9 | 36 |
| 2016 Rio de Janeiro | 9 | 18 | 12 | 39 |
| 2020 Tokyo | 7 | 6 | 11 | 24 |
| 2024 Paris | 8 | 6 | 9 | 23 |
| Totals (14 entries) | 277 | 271 | 228 | 776 |

=== Medals by Winter Games ===
| Games | Gold | Silver | Bronze | Total |
|---|---|---|---|---|
| 1976 Örnsköldsvik | 0 | 0 | 0 | 0 |
| 1984 Innsbruck | 3 | 2 | 8 | 13 |
| 1988 Innsbruck | 1 | 1 | 6 | 8 |
| 1992 Tignes-Albertsville | 2 | 0 | 3 | 5 |
| 1994 Lillehammer | 2 | 3 | 5 | 10 |
| 1998 Nagano | 0 | 0 | 2 | 2 |
| 2002 Salt Lake City | 1 | 0 | 2 | 3 |
| 2006 Turin | 2 | 0 | 0 | 2 |
| 2010 Vancouver | 0 | 0 | 1 | 1 |
| 2014 Sochi | 0 | 0 | 0 | 0 |
| 2018 Pyeongchang | 0 | 0 | 1 | 1 |
| 2022 Beijing | 0 | 0 | 0 | 0 |
| 2026 Milan/Cortina d'Ampezzo | 0 | 1 | 1 | 2 |
| Totals (13 entries) | 11 | 7 | 29 | 47 |

== Multi-medalists ==
Athletes who have won at least three gold medals or five medals of any colour.

| Athlete | Sport | Gold | Silver | Bronze | Total |
|---|---|---|---|---|---|
| Arkadiusz Pawłowski | Swimming | 10 | 3 | 5 | 18 |
| Jerzy Dąbrowski | Athletics; Sitting volleyball | 7 | 4 | 2 | 13 |
| Krzysztof Ślęczka | Swimming | 6 | 8 | 4 | 18 |
| Ryszard Machowczyk | Swimming | 6 | 3 | 1 | 10 |
| Natalia Partyka | Table tennis | 6 | 2 | 3 | 11 |
| Mirosław Pych | Athletics | 5 | 2 | 3 | 10 |
| Marta Makowska | Wheelchair fencing | 4 | 0 | 3 | 7 |
| Barbara Niewiedział | Athletics | 4 | 0 | 0 | 4 |
| Karolina Pęk | Table tennis | 3 | 0 | 5 | 8 |
| Waldemar Kikolski | Athletics | 3 | 3 | 1 | 7 |
| Joanna Mendak | Swimming | 3 | 1 | 2 | 6 |
| Andrzej Wróbel | Athletics | 3 | 1 | 1 | 5 |
| Rafał Wilk | Cycling | 3 | 1 | 0 | 4 |
| Katarzyna Pawlik | Swimming | 2 | 4 | 1 | 7 |
| Dariusz Pender | Wheelchair fencing | 2 | 3 | 4 | 9 |
| Piotr Grudzień | Table tennis | 2 | 1 | 3 | 6 |
| Renata Chilewska | Athletics | 1 | 2 | 3 | 6 |

== See also ==
- Poland at the Olympics
