= Anton Probst =

German Paralympic volleyball player

Medal record
Men's volleyball
Representing West Germany
Paralympic Games
Gold medal – first place	1988 Seoul	Volleyball - standing

Anton Probst competed for West Germany in the men's standing volleyball event at the 1988 Summer Paralympics, where he won a gold medal.

== See also ==
- West Germany at the 1988 Summer Paralympics
