= Sivan Mor =

Personal information
- Native name: סיוון מור

Sport
- Country: Israel
Medal record
| Event | 1st | 2nd | 3rd |
|---|---|---|---|
| World equestrian championship | 0 | 0 | 1 |

Sivan Mor (Hebrew: סיוון מור) is an Israeli athlete who represented Israel at the Paralympics in horse riding.

Mor was injured in Southern Lebanon during his military service in the Israel Defense Forces.

In 1996 he won bronze medal in the dressage at the world equestrian championships for the disabled.

At the 1996 Summer Paralympics Mor competed in Mixed Dressage Grade I and Mixed Kur Trot Grade I, finishing in seventh place.

In later years Mor began handcycling, ranking fifth at the Israeli national championship in 2010 and eighth in 2012.
