= Ronnie Alsup =

American paralympic athlete and standing volleyball player (1955–2014)

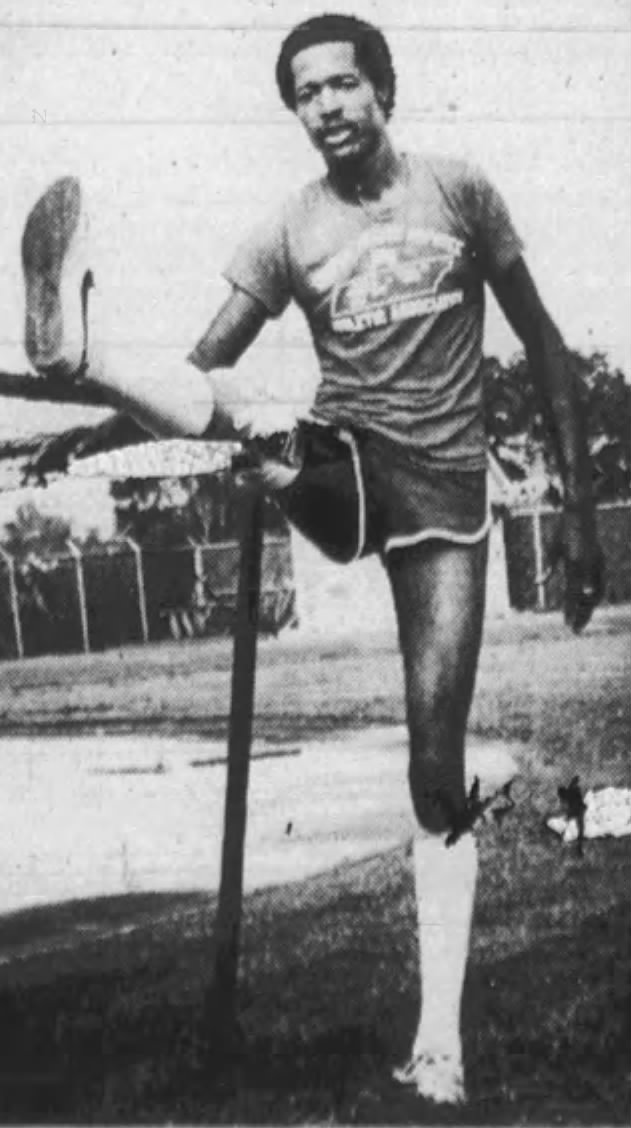
- Alsup in 1982

Personal information
- Born: Ronnie Eugene Bird Alsup; July 31, 1955 Murfreesboro, Tennessee, U.S.
- Died: August 14, 2014 (aged 59)

Sport
- Country: United States
- Sport: Para-athletics; Standing volleyball
Medal record
Representing United States
Paralympic Games
Para-athletics
Gold medal – first place	1984 Stoke Mandeville / New York	Men's high jump A4
Gold medal – first place	1984 Stoke Mandeville / New York	Men's long jump A4
Bronze medal – third place	1988 Seoul	Men's 4×100 m relay A2/A4–7
Gold medal – first place	1988 Seoul	Men's high jump A4/A9
Gold medal – first place	1988 Seoul	Men's long jump A4/A9

Ronnie Eugene Bird Alsup (July 31, 1955 – August 14, 2014) was an American paralympic athlete and standing volleyball player. He competed at the 1984 and 1988 Summer Paralympics.

== Life and career ==
Ronnie Alsup was born in Murfreesboro, Tennessee, the son of Lorene Alsup Watkins. He attended Riverdale High School, from which he graduated in 1973.

After high school, he worked as a watch and timepiece repairman.

As a young man, Ronnie Alsup lost one of his lower legs to surgery for bone cancer. Rather than letting his situation dictate his future or his attitude, Ronnie became the national amputee long jump record holder.

Alsup competed at the 1984 Summer Paralympics, winning two gold medals in athletics. He then competed at the 1988 Summer Paralympics, winning two gold medals and a bronze medal in athletics.

Alsup was a member of the United States Amputee Athletic Association.

== Death ==
Ronnie Alsup died on August 14, 2014, at the age of 59, of a heart attack.
