= Karl Quade =

German Paralympic volleyball player and athlete (1954–2025)

- Quade in 2024

Personal information
- Born: 6 December 1954
- Died: 26 December 2025 (aged 71)
Medal record
Men's volleyball
Representing West Germany
Paralympic Games
Gold medal – first place	1988 Seoul	Volleyball - standing

Karl Quade (6 December 1954 – 26 December 2025), also known as Mr. Paralympics, was a German Paralympic volleyball player. He competed for West Germany in the men's standing volleyball event at the 1988 Summer Paralympics, where he won a gold medal.

Quade also competed in athletics at the 1988 Summer Paralympics, placing fourth in the men's shot put event for the A6 / A8 / A9 / L6 classifications.

Quade died on 26 December 2025, at the age of 71.

== See also ==
- West Germany at the 1988 Summer Paralympics
