= Jerzy Dabrowski (volleyball) =

Polish Paralympic volleyball player and athlete

Jerzy Dąbrowski
Medal record
Representing Poland
Paralympic Games
Men's volleyball
Bronze medal – third place	1988 Seoul	Volleyball - standing
Men's para athletics
Gold medal – first place	1980 Arnhem	Javelin - E
Silver medal – second place	1980 Arnhem	Discus - E
Silver medal – second place	1980 Arnhem	Shot put - E
Bronze medal – third place	1980 Arnhem	Long jump - E
Gold medal – first place	1988 Seoul	Shot put - A6/A8/A9/L6
Gold medal – first place	1988 Seoul	Discus - A6/A8/A9/L6
Silver medal – second place	1988 Seoul	Javelin - A6/A8/A9/L6
Gold medal – first place	1992 Barcelona	Shot put - THS4
Gold medal – first place	1992 Barcelona	Discus - THS4
Silver medal – second place	1992 Barcelona	Javelin - THS4
Gold medal – first place	1996 Barcelona	Shot put - F46
Gold medal – first place	1996 Barcelona	Discus - F46

Jerzy Dąbrowski competed for Poland in the men's standing volleyball event at the 1988 Summer Paralympics, where he won a bronze medal.

He also competed in para athletics events at multiple Summer Paralympics:

- In athletics at the 1980 Summer Paralympics, he competed in the E classification, winning a gold medal in the men's javelin throw, silver medals in discus throw and shot put, and a bronze medal in the long jump, and placed fourth in the 100 m.
- In athletics at the 1988 Summer Paralympics he competed in the A6/A8/A9/L6 classification, winning gold medals in the men's shot put and discus throw and a silver medal in javelin throw.
- In athletics at the 1992 Summer Paralympics he competed in the THS4 classification, winning gold medals in the men's shot put and discus throw and a silver medal in javelin throw.
- In athletics at the 1996 Summer Paralympics he competed in the F46 classification, winning gold medals in the men's shot put and discus throw and placing sixth in javelin throw.
- In athletics at the 2000 Summer Paralympics he competed in the F46 classification, placing sixth in javelin throw.

== See also ==
- Poland at the 1980 Summer Paralympics
- Poland at the 1988 Summer Paralympics
- Poland at the 1992 Summer Paralympics
- Poland at the 1996 Summer Paralympics
- Poland at the 2000 Summer Paralympics
