= Volleyball at the 1976 Summer Paralympics =

Volleyball at the V Paralympic Games
- Paralympic standing and sitting volleyball
- Venue: Centennial Park Olympium

Medalists
1st place, gold medalist(s)		Israel (standing); Netherlands (sitting)
2nd place, silver medalist(s)		Great Britain (standing); West Germany (sitting)
3rd place, bronze medalist(s)		Finland (standing); Finland (sitting)

Volleyball at the 1976 Summer Paralympics consisted of a men's team event. Sitting volleyball was also included as a demonstration event. The competition was held at the Centennial Park Olympium in Toronto, Ontario, Canada.

== Medal summary ==
Event	Gold	Silver	Bronze
Men's standing	Israel; Nitzan Atzmon; Moshe Barbalat; Aharon Danziger; Roni Fradkin; Daniel Giladi; Eliezer Kalina; Gad Lanzer; Yigal Pazi; Hagai Zamir	Great Britain; Peter Pienerosa; Steve Paget; Ron Miller; Chris Ireland; B. Speedy; Len Softley; T. Puckering; James Anderson; T. Burdett; Monica Vaughan	Finland
Men's sitting	Netherlands	West Germany	Finland

== Medal table ==
Rank	Nation	Gold	Silver	Bronze	Total
1	Israel	1	0	0	1
1	Netherlands	1	0	0	1
3	Great Britain	0	1	0	1
3	West Germany	0	1	0	1
5	Finland	0	0	2	2
Totals (5 entries)		2	2	2	6
