= Israel at the 2004 Summer Paralympics =

- IPC code: ISR
- NPC: Israel Paralympic Committee
- Website: www.isad.org.il

in Athens
- Competitors: 24 in 6 sports
- Medals Ranked 32nd: Gold 4 Silver 4 Bronze 5 Total 13

Summer Paralympics appearances (overview)
- 1960; 1964; 1968; 1972; 1976; 1980; 1984; 1988; 1992; 1996; 2000; 2004; 2008; 2012; 2016; 2020; 2024

Israel competed at the 2004 Summer Paralympics in Athens, Greece. The team included 24 athletes, 21 men and 3 women. Competitors from Israel won 13 medals, including 4 gold, 4 silver and 5 bronze to finish 32nd in the medal table.

== Medallists ==
Medal	Name	Sport	Event
Gold	Dror Cohen; Arnon Efrati; Benni Vexler	Sailing	Mixed sonar
Gold	Izhak Mamistvalov	Swimming	Men's 50m freestyle S1
Gold	Izhak Mamistvalov	Swimming	Men's 100m freestyle S1
Gold	Keren Or Leybovitch	Swimming	Women's 100m backstroke S8
Silver	Izhak Mamistvalov	Swimming	Men's 200m freestyle S2
Silver	Keren Or Leybovitch	Swimming	Women's 50m freestyle S8
Silver	Keren Or Leybovitch	Swimming	Women's 100m freestyle S8
Silver	Inbal Pezaro	Swimming	Women's 100m breaststroke SB4
Bronze	Doron Shaziri	Shooting	Men's free rifle 3x40 SH1
Bronze	Doron Shaziri	Shooting	Mixed free rifle prone SH1
Bronze	Nimrod Zviran	Swimming	Men's 400m freestyle S7
Bronze	Inbal Pezaro	Swimming	Women's 200m freestyle S5
Bronze	Keren Or Leybovitch	Swimming	Women's 200m individual medley SM8

== Sports ==
=== Athletics ===
==== Men's field ====
Athlete	Class	Event	Final		
Athlete	Class	Event	Result	Points	Rank
Yogev Kenzi	F46	Long jump	6.11	-	8

=== Cycling ===
==== Men's road ====
Athlete	Event	Time	Rank
Ziv Bar Shira	Men's handcycle road race HC div B/C	1:27:32	9
Ziv Bar Shira	Men's handcycle time trial HC div B/C	20:28.97	11

=== Equestrian ===
Athlete	Event	Total	
Athlete	Event	Score	Rank
Omer Ben Dor	Mixed individual championship test grade I	67.158	7
Omer Ben Dor	Mixed individual freestyle test grade I	70.313	6
Eyal Shahar	Mixed individual championship test grade II	57.818	16
Eyal Shahar	Mixed individual freestyle test grade II	62.389	18
Itai Zuck	Mixed individual championship test grade II	66.000	10
Itai Zuck	Mixed individual freestyle test grade II	70.333	11

==== Team ====
Athlete	Event	Total	
Athlete	Event	Total	Rank
Omer Ben Dor; Eyal Shahar; Itai Zuck	Team	384.345	10

=== Shooting ===
==== Men ====
Athlete	Event	Qualification		Final		
Athlete	Event	Score	Rank	Score	Total	Rank
Eliahu Chabra	Men's 10m air pistol SH1	548	28	did not advance		
Eliahu Chabra	Mixed 50m pistol SH1	513	15	did not advance		
Abraham Hadassi	Mixed 50m rifle prone SH1	590	4 Q	101.2	691.2	4
Doron Shaziri	Men's 50m 3 positions SH1	1146	3 Q	97.8	1243.8	3rd place, bronze medalist(s)
Doron Shaziri	Mixed 50m rifle prone SH1	592	3 Q	100.4	692.4	3rd place, bronze medalist(s)
Ilan Zaltsman	Men's 10m air pistol SH1	543	30	did not advance		
Ilan Zaltsman	Mixed 50m pistol SH1	490	26	did not advance		

=== Swimming ===
==== Men ====
Athlete	Class	Event	Heats		Final	
Athlete	Class	Event	Result	Rank	Result	Rank
Ziv Better	S12	50m freestyle	26.89	11	did not advance	
Ziv Better	S12	100m freestyle	1:00.15	13	did not advance	
Hanoch Budin	S9	50m freestyle	28.99	18	did not advance	
Izhar Cohen	S11	50m freestyle	28.49	6 Q	28.17	5
Izhar Cohen	S11	100m freestyle	1:06.19	7 Q	1:07.01	7
Izhak Mamistvalov	S1	50m freestyle	N/A		1:10.88 PR	1st place, gold medalist(s)
Izhak Mamistvalov	S1	100m freestyle	N/A		2:35.24	1st place, gold medalist(s)
Izhak Mamistvalov	S2	200m freestyle	5:37.43	5 Q	5:07.44	2nd place, silver medalist(s)
Nimrod Zviran	S7	50m freestyle	30.03	3 Q	30.07	4
Nimrod Zviran	S7	100m freestyle	1:07.27	5 Q	1:07.06	6
Nimrod Zviran	S7	400m freestyle	5:17.08	5 Q	5:06.15	3rd place, bronze medalist(s)

==== Women ====
Athlete	Class	Event	Heats		Final	
Athlete	Class	Event	Result	Rank	Result	Rank
Keren Or Leybovitch	S8	50m freestyle	32.68	1 Q	32.11	2nd place, silver medalist(s)
Keren Or Leybovitch	S8	100m freestyle	1:11.27	2 Q	1:09.86	2nd place, silver medalist(s)
Keren Or Leybovitch	S8	400m freestyle	5:32.28	4 Q	5:34.43	6
Keren Or Leybovitch	S8	100m backstroke	1:21.20	1 Q	1:19.55	1st place, gold medalist(s)
Keren Or Leybovitch	SM8	200m individual medley	3:07.13	4 Q	3:03.38	3rd place, bronze medalist(s)
Inbal Pezaro	S5	50m freestyle	41.42	5 Q	40.71	5
Inbal Pezaro	S5	100m freestyle	1:25.68	4 Q	1:23.59	4
Inbal Pezaro	S5	200m freestyle	3:05.11	3 Q	2:58.74	3rd place, bronze medalist(s)
Inbal Pezaro	SB4	100m breaststroke	2:02.00	3 Q	2:00.07	2nd place, silver medalist(s)
Inbal Schwartz	S6	50m freestyle	43.00	13	did not advance	
Inbal Schwartz	S6	100m freestyle	1:33.14	12	did not advance	
Inbal Schwartz	S6	100m backstroke	1:45.23	8 Q	1:46.45	8

=== Table tennis ===
Athlete	Event	Preliminaries				Round of 16	Quarterfinals	Semifinals	Final / BM	
Athlete	Event	Opposition Result	Opposition Result	Opposition Result	Rank	Opposition Result	Opposition Result	Opposition Result	Opposition Result	Rank
David Altaratz	Men's singles 10	Agudo (ESP); W 3-0	Karabec (CZE); L 1-3	N/A	1 Q	N/A	Ruiz (ESP); L 0-3	did not advance		
Zeev Glikman	Men's singles 8	Schaller (FRA); W 3–1	Skrzynecki (POL); W 3–0	Mitas (SVK); W 2–0	1 Q	Loicq (BEL); L 0–3	did not advance			

=== Wheelchair tennis ===
==== Quads ====
Athlete	Class	Event	Round of 16	Quarterfinals	Semifinals	Finals
Athlete	Class	Event	Opposition Result	Opposition Result	Opposition Result	Opposition Result
Shraga Weinberg	Open	Quads' singles	Takashima (JPN); W 6–2, 6–3	Wagner (USA); L 5–7, 7–5, 3-6	did not advance	
