= Volleyball at the 1984 Summer Paralympics =

Volleyball at the VII Paralympic Games
- Paralympic standing and sitting volleyball

Medalists
| 1st place, gold medalist(s) | | Israel (ISR) (standing); Netherlands (NED) (sitting) |
| 2nd place, silver medalist(s) | | West Germany (FRG) (standing); West Germany (FRG) (sitting) |
| 3rd place, bronze medalist(s) | | France (FRA) (standing); Sweden (SWE) (sitting) |

Paralympic symbol (1988-1994)

Volleyball at the 1984 Summer Paralympics in Stoke Mandeville and New York consisted of standing and sitting volleyball events for men.

== Medal summary ==
| Event | Gold | Silver | Bronze |
|---|---|---|---|
| Men's standing | Israel (ISR); Nitzan Atzmon; Moshe Barbalat; Shlomo Borenshtein; Aharon Danziger; Roni Fradkin; Eliezer Kalina; Zvi Karsh; Yigal Pazi; Eliyahu Unger; Hagai Zamir | West Germany (FRG) | France (FRA) |
| Men's sitting | Netherlands (NED) | West Germany (FRG) | Sweden (SWE) |

== Medal table ==
| Rank | Nation | Gold | Silver | Bronze | Total |
|---|---|---|---|---|---|
| 1 | Israel (ISR) | 1 | 0 | 0 | 1 |
| 1 | Netherlands (NED) | 1 | 0 | 0 | 1 |
| 3 | West Germany (FRG) | 0 | 2 | 0 | 2 |
| 4 | France (FRA) | 0 | 0 | 1 | 1 |
| 4 | Sweden (SWE) | 0 | 0 | 1 | 1 |
| Totals (5 entries) | | 2 | 2 | 2 | 6 |
