= Volleyball at the 1980 Summer Paralympics =

Volleyball at the VI Paralympic Games
- Paralympic standing and sitting volleyball

Medalists
1st place, gold medalist(s)		Israel (ISR) (standing); Netherlands (NED) (sitting)
2nd place, silver medalist(s)		Poland (POL) (standing); Sweden (SWE) (sitting)
3rd place, bronze medalist(s)		West Germany (FRG) (standing); Yugoslavia (YUG) (sitting)

Volleyball at the 1980 Summer Paralympics in Arnhem consisted of standing and sitting volleyball events for men.

== Medal summary ==
Event	Gold	Silver	Bronze
Men's standing	Israel (ISR); Nitzan Atzmon; Moshe Barbalat; Aharon Danziger; Roni Fradkin; Eliezer Kalina; Zvi Karsh; Yigal Pazi; Eliyahu Unger; Hagai Zamir	Poland (POL)	West Germany (FRG)
Men's sitting	Netherlands (NED)	Sweden (SWE)	Yugoslavia (YUG)

== Medal table ==
Rank	Nation	Gold	Silver	Bronze	Total
1	Israel (ISR)	1	0	0	1
1	Netherlands (NED)	1	0	0	1
3	Poland (POL)	0	1	0	1
3	Sweden (SWE)	0	1	0	1
5	West Germany (FRG)	0	0	1	1
5	Yugoslavia (YUG)	0	0	1	1
Totals (6 entries)		2	2	2	6
