= Israel at the 1960 Summer Paralympics =

- IPC code: ISR
- NPC: Israel Paralympic Committee
- Website: www.isad.org.il

in Rome
- Competitors: Unknown number in 3 sports
- Medals Ranked 16th: Gold 0 Silver 2 Bronze 2 Total 4

Summer Paralympics appearances (overview)
- 1960; 1964; 1968; 1972; 1976; 1980; 1984; 1988; 1992; 1996; 2000; 2004; 2008; 2012; 2016; 2020; 2024

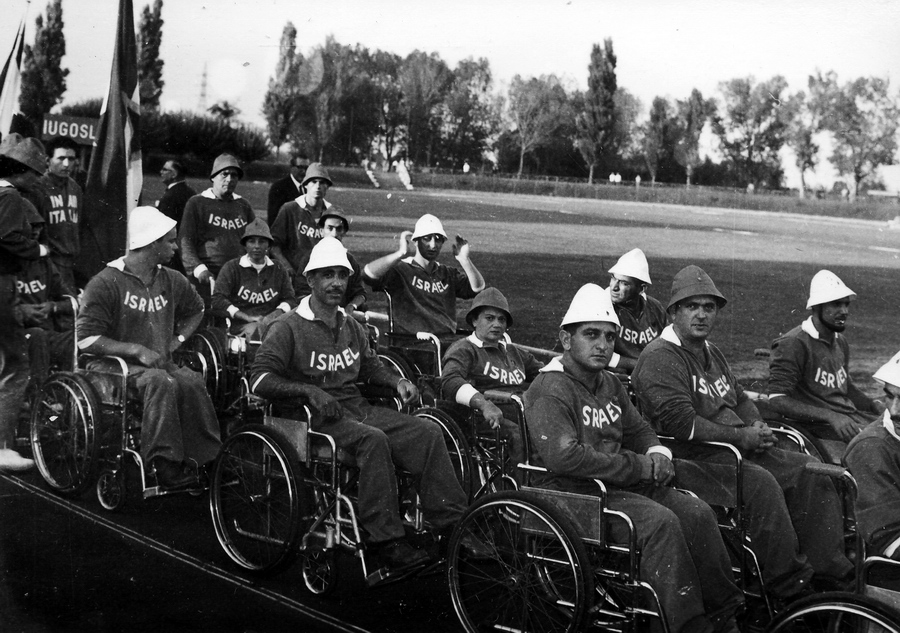
Israel at Rome 1960

Israel, participated in the inaugural Paralympic Games in 1960 held in Rome, Italy. The 1960 Paralympics, now considered to have been the first Paralympic Games, were initially known as the ninth Stoke Mandeville Games, an event for athletes with disabilities founded in Great Britain in 1948.

Israel sent two athletes to compete in individual competitions and a team to compete in wheelchair basketball. The names of the wheelchair basketball team members are not known as they are not recorded in the original hardcopy final results publication.

== Medalists ==
The team won four medals, two silver and two bronze, and finished sixteenth in the medal table.

Medal	Name	Sport	Event
Silver	Mati Angel	Swimming	Women's 25m breaststroke complete class 1
Silver	Mati Angel	Table tennis	Women's singles A
Bronze	Israel Globus	Swimming	Men's 50m backstroke complete class 4
Bronze	Men's team Zvi Ben-Zvi; Moshe Feld; Aharon Kirschner; Simcha Lustig; Naftali Rosman	Wheelchair basketball	Men's class A

== Swimming ==
Both of Israel's individual competitors participated in swimming events. Official results name them as Globus, who competed in the men's 50 m backstroke complete class 4, and Engel, who competed in the women's 25 m breaststroke complete class 1. Globus won the bronze medal, finishing five seconds behind the other two swimmers in his event. Engel was one of just two competitors in her race and won the silver medal behind Arriens-Kappens of The Netherlands; no bronze medal was awarded.

== Table tennis ==
In addition to competing in swimming Engel also took part in the women's Singles A table tennis event. She won a silver medal with Great Britain's Anderson winning gold and Tora Lysoe, from Norway, the bronze.

== Wheelchair basketball ==
The Israeli team won the bronze medal in the men's class A wheelchair basketball. Great Britain won silver and gold went to the United States team.
