= Israel at the 2000 Summer Paralympics =

- IPC code: ISR
- NPC: Israel Paralympic Committee
- Website: www.isad.org.il

in Sydney
- Competitors: 34 (32 male, 2 female)
- Medals Ranked 37th: Gold 3 Silver 2 Bronze 1 Total 6

Summer Paralympics appearances (overview)
- 1960; 1964; 1968; 1972; 1976; 1980; 1984; 1988; 1992; 1996; 2000; 2004; 2008; 2012; 2016; 2020; 2024

There were 2 female and 32 male athletes representing the country at the 2000 Summer Paralympics.

== Medal table ==
Medal	Name	Sport	Event
Gold	Keren Or Leybovitch	Swimming	Women's 50m freestyle S8
Gold	Keren Or Leybovitch	Swimming	Women's 100m backstroke S8
Gold	Keren Or Leybovitch	Swimming	Women's 100m freestyle S8
Silver	Doron Shaziri	Shooting	Mixed free rifle prone SH1
Silver	Zeev Glikman	Table tennis	Men's singles 7
Bronze	Yogev Kenzi	Athletics	Men's long jump F46

== Bibliography ==
- International Paralympic Committee (2000). "Appendix C: Athlete Numbers - By Delegation". Sydney 2000 Paralympic Games Post Games Report. Sydney.
