= Israel at the 2012 Summer Paralympics =

- IPC code: ISR
- NPC: Israel Paralympic Committee
- Website: www.isad.org.il

in London
- Competitors: 25 in 9 sports
- Flag bearers: Doron Shaziri (opening); Noam Gershony (closing)
- Medals Ranked 45th: Gold 1 Silver 2 Bronze 5 Total 8

Summer Paralympics appearances (overview)
- 1960; 1964; 1968; 1972; 1976; 1980; 1984; 1988; 1992; 1996; 2000; 2004; 2008; 2012; 2016; 2020; 2024

Israel competed at the 2012 Summer Paralympics in London, United Kingdom, from 29 August to 9 September.

The country was represented by twenty-five athletes (eighteen men and seven women), who competed in nine sports: athletics, equestrian, road cycling, rowing, sailing, shooting, swimming, table tennis, and wheelchair tennis. The Israeli athletes included six-time Paralympic shooting medallist Doron Shaziri.

== Medalists ==
Medal	Name	Sport	Event	Date
Gold	Noam Gershony	Wheelchair tennis	Quad Singles	8 September
Silver	Doron Shaziri	Shooting	Men's 50 metre rifle 3 positions SH1	5 September
Silver	Koby Lion	Cycling	Men's Time Trial H1	5 September
Bronze; Bronze; Bronze	Inbal Pezaro	Swimming	Women's 50m Freestyle S5; Women's 200m freestyle S5; Women's 100m freestyle S5	30 August; 1 September; 8 September
Bronze	Itzhak Mamistvalov	Swimming	Men's 200m freestyle S2	1 September
Bronze	Noam Gershony; Shraga Weinberg	Wheelchair tennis	Quad Doubles	5 September

== Athletics ==
Men's Track and Road Events

Athlete	Event	Final	
Athlete	Event	Result	Rank
Gad Yarkoni	Marathon T12	3:01:51	13

== Cycling ==
=== Road ===
Men

Athlete	Event	Time	Rank
Koby Lion	Road Race H1	LAP	
Koby Lion	Time Trial H1	35:53.30	2nd place, silver medalist(s)
Nati Groberg	Road Race H4	2:11:58	9
Nati Groberg	Time Trial H4	27:30.04	7

Women

Athlete	Event	Time	Rank
Pascale Bercovitch	Road Race H4	LAP	
Pascale Bercovitch	Time Trial H4	38:49.22	6

Mixed

Athlete	Event	Time	Rank
Koby Lion; Nati Groberg; Pascale Bercovitch	Team Relay H1-4	LAP	

== Equestrian ==
Athlete	Horse	Event	Total	
Athlete	Horse	Event	Score	Rank
Yonatan Dresler	Ubelisk	Individual Championship III	65.333	10
Yonatan Dresler	Ubelisk	Individual Freestyle III	60.250	11

== Rowing ==
Athlete	Event	Heats		Repechage		Final	
Athlete	Event	Time	Rank	Time	Rank	Time	Rank
Moran Samuel	Women's Single Sculls	5:45.47	3 R	5:44.78	1 FA	5:48.67	5
Reuven Magnagey; Olga Sokolov	Mixed Double Sculls	4:18.45	6 R	4:20.20	4 FB	4:14.90	9

== Sailing ==
Athlete	Event	Race											Net points	Rank
Athlete	Event	1	2	3	4	5	6	7	8	9	10	11*	Net points	Rank
Shimon Ben Yakov; Hagar Zahavi	SKUD 18	6	7	7	5	(12)	6	5	8	4	6	—N/a	64	6
Dror Cohen; Arnon Efrati; Benny Vexler	Sonar	9	(13)	4	10	13	11	4	6	7	7	—N/a	68	9

* The 11th race was cancelled due to bad weather.

== Shooting ==
Athlete	Event	Qualification		Final	
Athlete	Event	Score	Rank	Score	Rank
Doron Shaziri	Men's 50m Rifle 3 Positions SH1	1157	1 Q	1252.4	2nd place, silver medalist(s)
Doron Shaziri	Mixed 50m Rifle Prone SH1	589	4 Q	691.8	6

== Swimming ==
Men

Athletes	Event	Heat		Final	
Athletes	Event	Time	Rank	Time	Rank
Itzhak Mamistvalov	50m freestyle S2	1:08.73	7 Q	1:07.94	6
Itzhak Mamistvalov	100m freestyle S2	2:26.55	5 Q	2:25.60	6
Itzhak Mamistvalov	200m freestyle S2	—N/a		4:58.53	3rd place, bronze medalist(s)
Iad Josef Shalabi	50m freestyle S2	1:07.52	4 Q	1:07.07	5
Iad Josef Shalabi	100m freestyle S2	2:25.55	4 Q	2:24.73	5
Iad Josef Shalabi	200m freestyle S2	—N/a		4:58.54	4
Iad Josef Shalabi	50m backstroke S2	1:08.37	5 Q	1:08.97	6
Yoav Valinsky	100m freestyle S6	1:14.65	14	Did not advance	
Yoav Valinsky	100m backstroke S6	1:34.12	11	Did not advance	
Yoav Valinsky	100m breaststroke SB6	1:34.31	9	Did not advance	
Yoav Valinsky	200m individual medley SM6	3:03.88	11	Did not advance	

Women

Athletes	Event	Heat		Final	
Athletes	Event	Time	Rank	Time	Rank
Inbal Pezaro	50m freestyle S5	39.74	5 Q	37.89	3rd place, bronze medalist(s)
Inbal Pezaro	100m freestyle S5	1:25.91	5 Q	1:22.56	3rd place, bronze medalist(s)
Inbal Pezaro	200m freestyle S5	2:57.14	2 Q	2:56.11	3rd place, bronze medalist(s)
Inbal Pezaro	100m breaststroke SB4	1:57.95	4 Q	1:56.73	4
Inbal Schwartz	50m freestyle S6	39.02	13	Did not advance	
Inbal Schwartz	100m freestyle S6	1:31.62	16	Did not advance	
Inbal Schwartz	100m backstroke S6	1:44.43	12	Did not advance	
Inbal Schwartz	50m butterfly S6	39.26	3 Q	39.89	5
Erel Halevi	50m freestyle S7	38.30	12	Did not advance	
Erel Halevi	100m freestyle S7	1:19.71	10	Did not advance	
Erel Halevi	400m freestyle S7	5:48.43	9	Did not advance	

== Table tennis ==
Men

Athlete	Event	Group stage			Round of 16	Quarterfinals	Semifinals	Final	
Athlete	Event	Opposition Result	Opposition Result	Rank	Opposition Result	Opposition Result	Opposition Result	Opposition Result	Rank
Liran Geva	Individual C3	Copola (ARG); L 0–3	Merrien (FRA); L 0–3	3	—N/a	Did not advance			
Shay Siada	Individual C4	Choi (KOR); L 0–3	Caci (ITA); W 3–0	2	—N/a	Did not advance			
Liran Geva; Shay Siada	Team C4-5	—N/a			BYE	France; L 0–3	Did not advance		

== Wheelchair Tennis ==
Athlete	Event	Round of 16	Quarterfinals	Semifinals	Bronze medal	Final	
Athlete	Event	Opposition Result	Opposition Result	Opposition Result	Opposition Result	Opposition Result	Rank
Noam Gershony	Quad Singles	Burdekin (GBR); W 3–6, 6–3, 6–3	Barten (USA); W 6–1, 6–1	Weinberg (ISR); W 6–0, 6–0	—N/a	Wagner (USA); W 6–2, 6–1	1st place, gold medalist(s)
Boaz Kramer	Quad Singles	Polidori (ITA); W 6–3, 6–2	Wagner (USA); L 3–6, 0–6	Did not advance			
Shraga Weinberg	Quad Singles	Jonsson (SWE); W 6–1, 6–2	Norfolk (GBR); W 3–6, 7–5, 6–0	Gershony (ISR); L 0–6, 0–6	Taylor (USA); L 6–1, 3–6, 4–6	—N/a	4
Noam Gershony; Shraga Weinberg	Quad Doubles	—N/a	Hard, Jonsson (SWE); W 6–1, 6–4	Taylor, Wagner (USA); L 3–6, 6–7	Kawano, Moroishi (JPN); W 6–3, 6–1	—N/a	3rd place, bronze medalist(s)
