= Igal Pazi =

Israeli Paralympic athlete

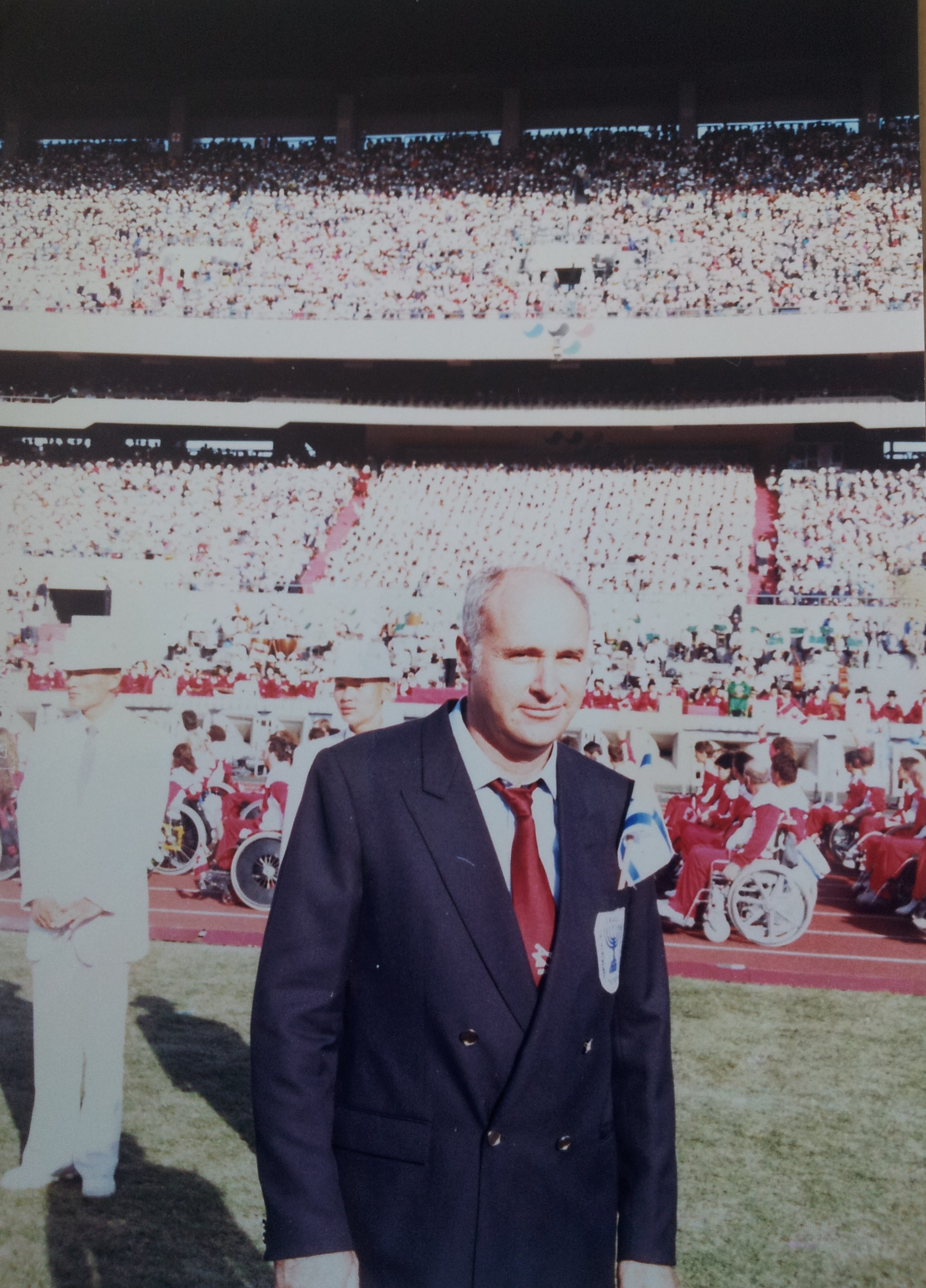
- Igal Pazi at the 1988 Paralympic Games, Seoul

Personal information
- Native name: יגאל פזי
- Born: 31 December 1939 (age 86) Usha, Mandatory Palestine
Medal record
Event / 1st / 2nd / 3rd; Paralympic Games / 3 / 1 / 0
Men's volleyball
Representing Israel
Paralympic Games
Men's volleyball
Gold medal – first place	1976 Toronto	Volleyball - standing
Gold medal – first place	1980 Arnhem	Volleyball - standing
Gold medal – first place	1984 New York	Volleyball - standing
Silver medal – second place	1988 Seoul	Volleyball - standing
Volleyball World Cup
Gold medal – first place	1976 Germany	Volleyball
Gold medal – first place	1983	Volleyball
Silver medal – second place	1986 Israel	Volleyball
Silver medal – second place	1989 Poland	Volleyball
Volleyball Euro Cup
Gold medal – first place	1979	Volleyball
Bronze medal – third place	1973	Volleyball
Bronze medal – third place	1987	Volleyball
Bronze medal – third place	1989	Volleyball

Igal Pazi (Hebrew: יגאל פזי, also transliterated Yigal Pazi; born 31 December 1939) is as an Israeli Paralympic medalist, who was a member of the Israeli volleyball team between 1973 and 1990. He won four Paralympic medals (3 gold, 1 silver), four World Cups (2 gold, 2 silver) and four Euro Cups (1 gold, 3 bronze).

== Biography ==
Igal Pazi was born at Kibbutz Usha (Israel), son to Rachel (Rushka) and Shmuel Pazi.

During the Six Day War Pazi served in the 78th patrol platoon of the Alexandroni reserve infantry brigade which fought in the Golan Heights. On Friday afternoon 9 June 1967 Pazi stepped on a land mine on the platoon's way to Darbashiya. Losing his right leg below the knee Pazi was hospitalized at the Rambam hospital in Haifa. His nurse was Judith Cohen-Aloro whom he married on 5 November 1967.

== Volleyball career ==
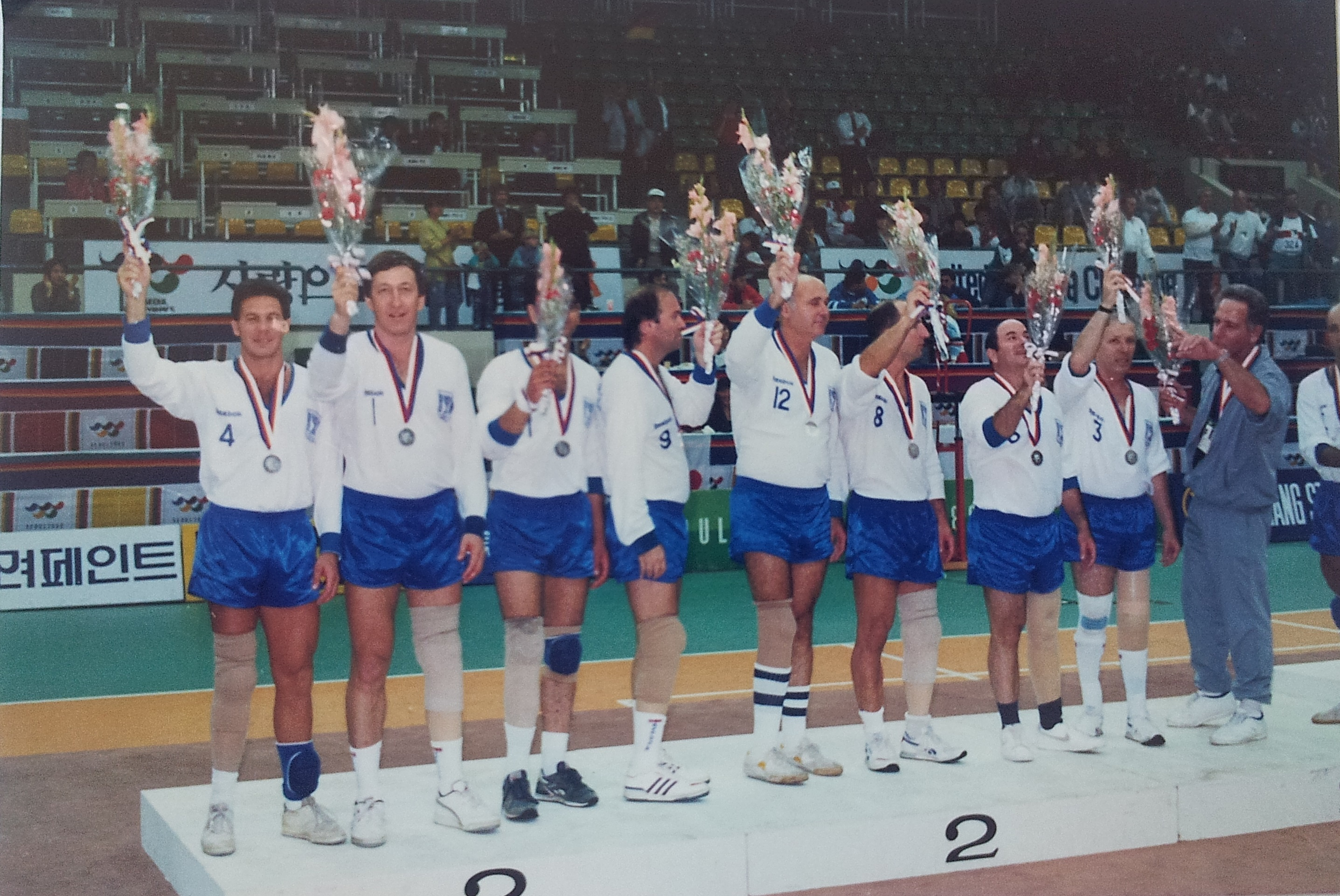
Silver medal to Israel. 1988 Seoul Paralympic Games

Prior to his injury Pazi played volleyball in the Zevulun team. A couple of years after his rehabilitation Pazi returned to the volleyball court, playing for a disabled team formed in Haifa. Pazi joined the national disabled team from its formation in 1973.

Following the 1974 opening of "Beit Halochem" in Tel Aviv sport for disabled in Israel gained momentum, particularly the volleyball team which reached unprecedented achievements. The team also played in the "regular" league in Israel with great success.

Pazi retired from the national team in 1990.
