= Hagai Zamir =

Israeli Paralympic volleyball player

Personal information
- Native name: חגי זמיר
- Born: 1951 (age 74–75) Zikim, Israel
Medal record
Event / 1st / 2nd / 3rd; Paralympic Games / 3 / 1 / 0
Representing Israel
Paralympic Games
Men's volleyball
Gold medal – first place	1976 Toronto	Volleyball - standing
Gold medal – first place	1980 Arnhem	Volleyball - standing
Gold medal – first place	1984 New York	Volleyball - standing
Silver medal – second place	1988 Seoul	Volleyball - standing
Volleyball World Championship
Gold medal – first place	1976	Volleyball
Gold medal – first place	1983	Volleyball
Silver medal – second place	1986	Volleyball

Hagai Zamir (Hebrew: חגי זמיר; born 1951) is an Israeli paralympic volleyball champion.

== Biography ==
Hagai Zamir was born on Kibbutz Zikim. He served with the IDF's Paratroopers Brigade. On January 2, 1970, during the War of Attrition, Zamir was sent with his unit to the island of Shadwan as part of Operation Rhodes. Zamir and two comrades were injured by a mine. Zamir's left leg was amputated. After six months of rehabilitation he returned to the kibbutz and worked in the cotton fields. He also went back to playing volleyball, now on a team for the disabled.

Zamir is married and father of two. He was inducted into the International Jewish Sports Hall of Fame in 1997.

== Sports career ==
Zamir was an active member of the disabled volleyball team for 30 years, taking part in seven Paralympic Games. He is a certified volleyball and tennis coach. He has been teaching in schools since 1982 and in 1992 he also became a coach of Kfar Saba's municipal team. Several of his teams won national championships.

== See also ==
- Sports in Israel
- List of select Jewish volleyball players
