= Eliezer Kalina =

Israeli Paralympic volleyball player

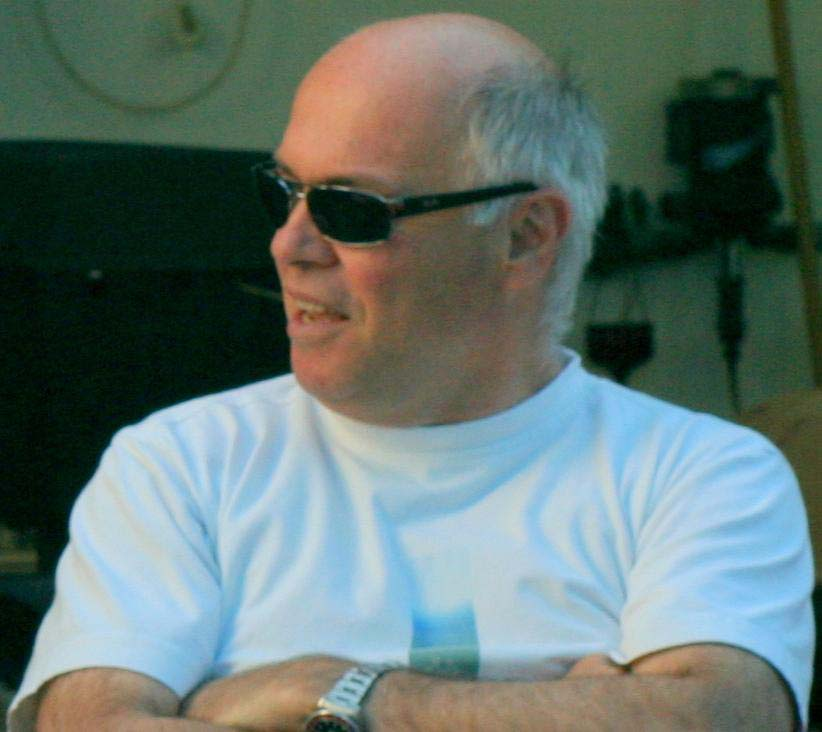
- Kalina in 2007, days before his death

Personal information
- Native name: אליעזר קלינה
- Born: 25 March 1948
- Died: 29 April 2007 (aged 59)
Medal record
Event / 1st / 2nd / 3rd; Paralympic Games / 3 / 1 / 0
Representing Israel
Paralympic Games
Men's volleyball
Gold medal – first place	1976 Toronto	Volleyball - standing
Gold medal – first place	1980 Arnhem	Volleyball - standing
Gold medal – first place	1984 New York	Volleyball - standing
Silver medal – second place	1988 Seoul	Volleyball - standing

Eliezer Kalina (Hebrew: אליעזר קלינה; 25 March 1948 – 29 April 2007) was an Israeli paralympic champion.

Kalina began practicing sports at the age of 10. He was a member of Hapoel Petah Tikva youth football team and, simultaneously, a member of the club's volleyball team. In 1966 he transferred to Hapoel Herzliya, in which he played until he was injured during the Yom Kippur War. Prior to the war he graduated from Wingate College of Physical Education and began studying in the United States.

Kalina returned to Israel to join the IDF during the war. On 18 October 1973, he was in a half-track in Syrian territory. The task they were sent for was aborted and Kalina and his team remained within Syrian borders until they could retreat. The half-track was spotted and attacked. Two of Kalina's team members were killed and his own leg was amputated. During his rehabilitation he studied law, but focused his interest in sports.

Throughout the years Kalina was a member of the IDF veterans volleyball team. In 1974, he established a volleyball team in the rehabilitation center he practiced in, and began serving the team coach. As both player and coach he shared three gold medals and one silver medal at the Paralympic Games. In 1992 they reached sixth place.

Kalina was active in sports until the early 2000s (decade). He also completed MBA studies and an MA in political science, while working for Tel Aviv University and the Prime Minister's Office.

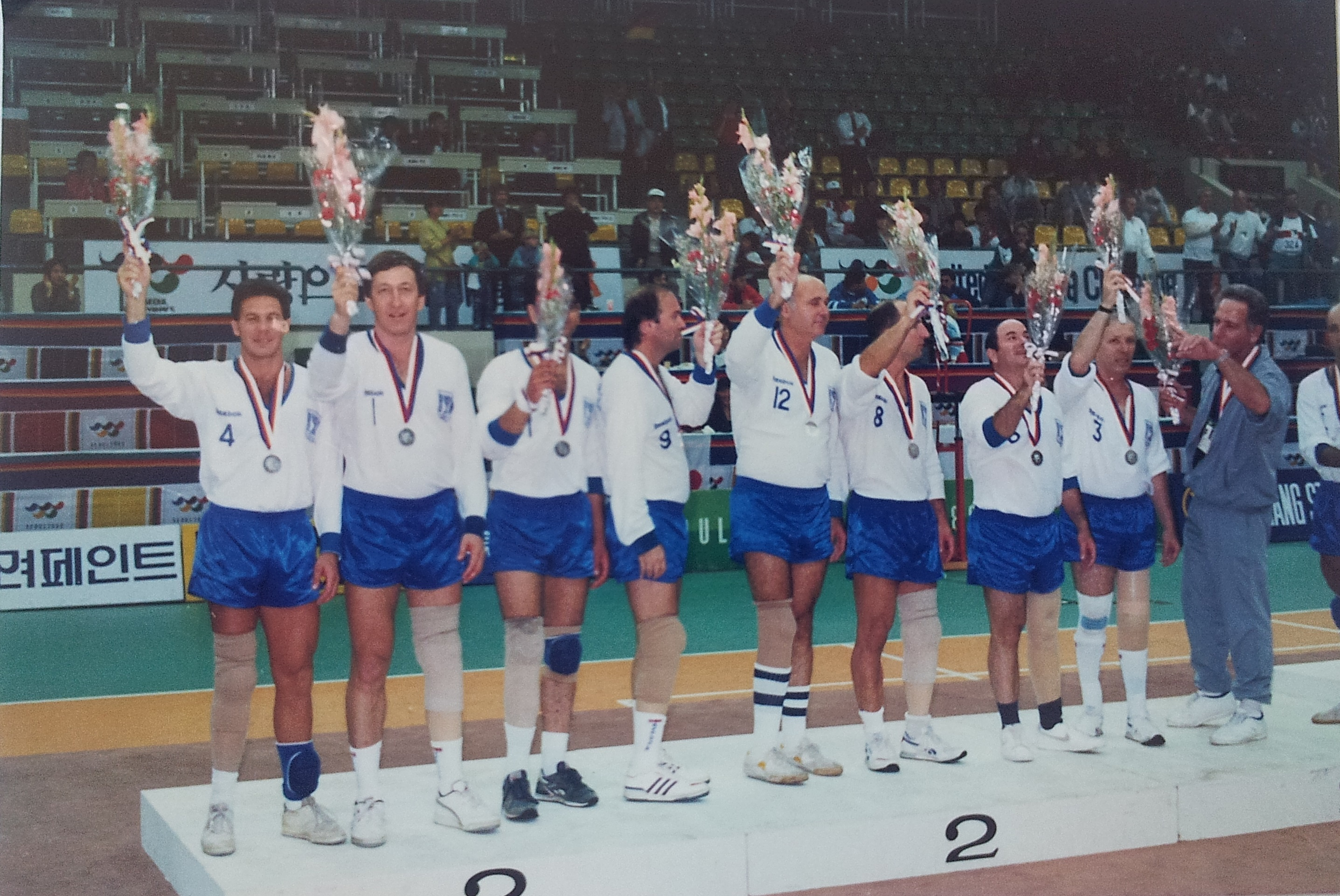
Silver medal to Israel. 1988 Seoul Paralympic Games
