= Standing volleyball =

Variation of volleyball for disabled players

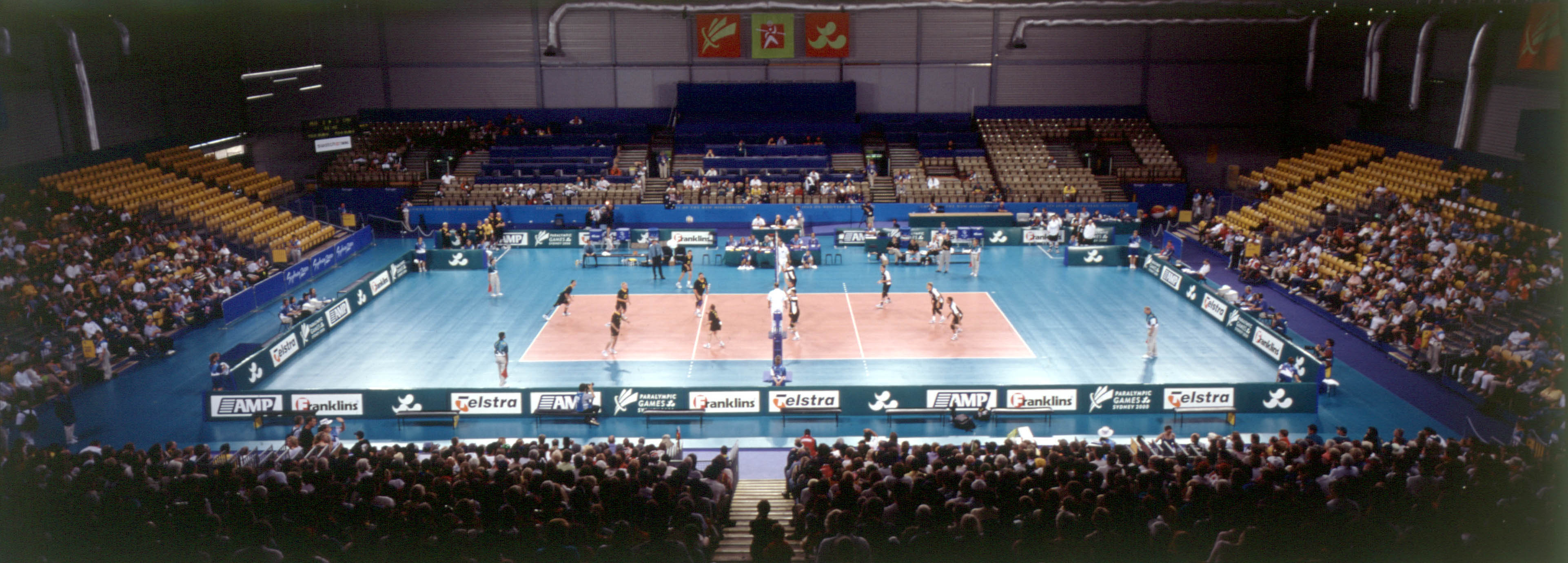
Standing volleyball at the 2000 Sydney Paralympics

Standing volleyball is a team sport that can be played "standing" by people with physical disabilities. The Amputee athletes have a choice to play with or without prostheses. Depending on the sense of balance, some above the knee amputees will choose to play without a prosthesis hopping on a single leg. Standing volleyball is played on an integrated FIVB rules. The game of Standing Volleyball decided to allow other disability groups to take part, therefore encouraging more nations to participate. Although this initially created more classification problems, the WOVD finally, after four years, established criteria for classification, which includes those players with various arm or leg disabilities.

Beach ParaVolley is a version of standing volleyball that is played on beach courts rather than indoor courts. It is played with three-member teams and works within the Paralympic classification system. Standard FIVB Beach Volleyball rules are followed. World ParaVolley made bids for the sport to be included in the 2026 Commonwealth Games, the Mediterranean Beach Games, and the 2028 Summer Paralympics; it would not be chosen for the Paralympics.
