= Israel at the Paralympics =

- IPC code: ISR
- NPC: Israel Paralympic Committee
- Website: www.isad.org.il
- Medals: Gold 133 Silver 127 Bronze 134 Total 394

Summer appearances
- 1960; 1964; 1968; 1972; 1976; 1980; 1984; 1988; 1992; 1996; 2000; 2004; 2008; 2012; 2016; 2020; 2024

Winter appearances
- 2022

Israeli athletes have participated in the Paralympic Games since 1960.

== History ==
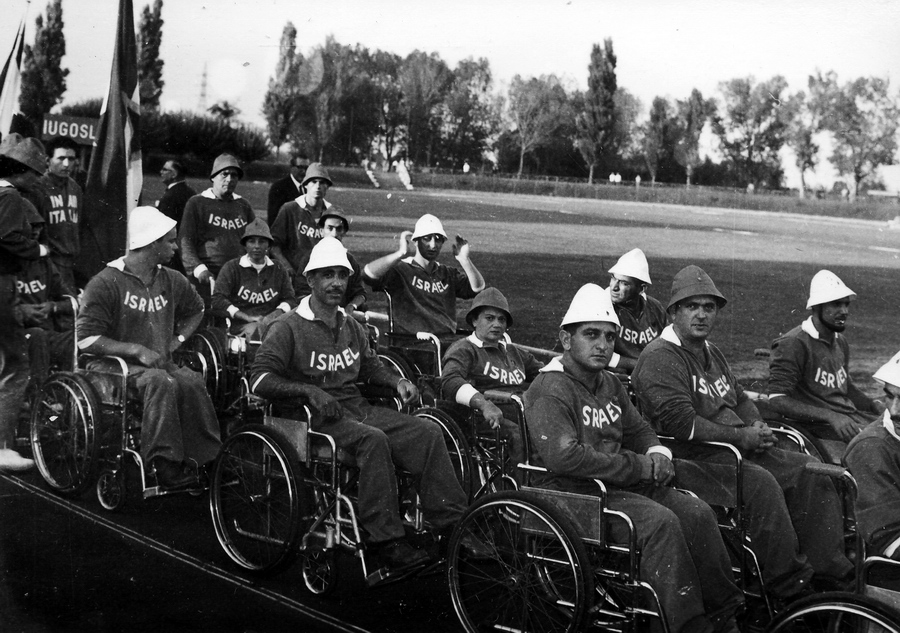
Israeli paralympics team, 1960

Israel first competed in 1960, at the Summer Games in Rome, Italy. As of 2024, Israel has won a total of 394 medals: 133 gold, 127 silver, and 134 bronze, ranking 18th on the all-time Paralympic medal table.

The most successful Israeli Paralympian was Zipora Rubin-Rosenbaum, who, between 1964 and 1988, won 31 medals at the Paralympic Games, of which 15 were gold. Second successful Israeli Paralympian was Uri Bergman, who, between 1976 and 1988, won 15 medals at the Paralympic Games, of which 12 were gold.

Tel Aviv was the host city of the 1968 Summer Paralympics, at which Israel finished third on the medal chart with 62 medals, of which 18 were gold. Israel is the only nation to have hosted Paralympic but not Olympic Games.

At the 2004 Summer Paralympics in Athens, Israelis won a total of thirteen medals, of which four were gold. Izhak Mamistvalov won three medals (of which two were gold) in swimming, while Keren Leibowitz won four medals, of which one was gold, also in swimming.

Israel made its debut at the Winter Paralympics in March 2022.

At the 2024 Summer Paralympics in Paris, Israel achieved its best result in two decades, winning 10 medals: 4 gold, 2 silver, and 4 bronze. Gold medals were won by swimmer Ami Omer Dadaon (in the 100m and 200m freestyle S4), taekwondo athlete Asaf Yasur (men's −58kg), and rower Moran Samuel (PR1 women's single sculls). Israel also won a silver medal in women's goalball and several bronzes in swimming, rowing, and wheelchair tennis.

== Medal tables ==
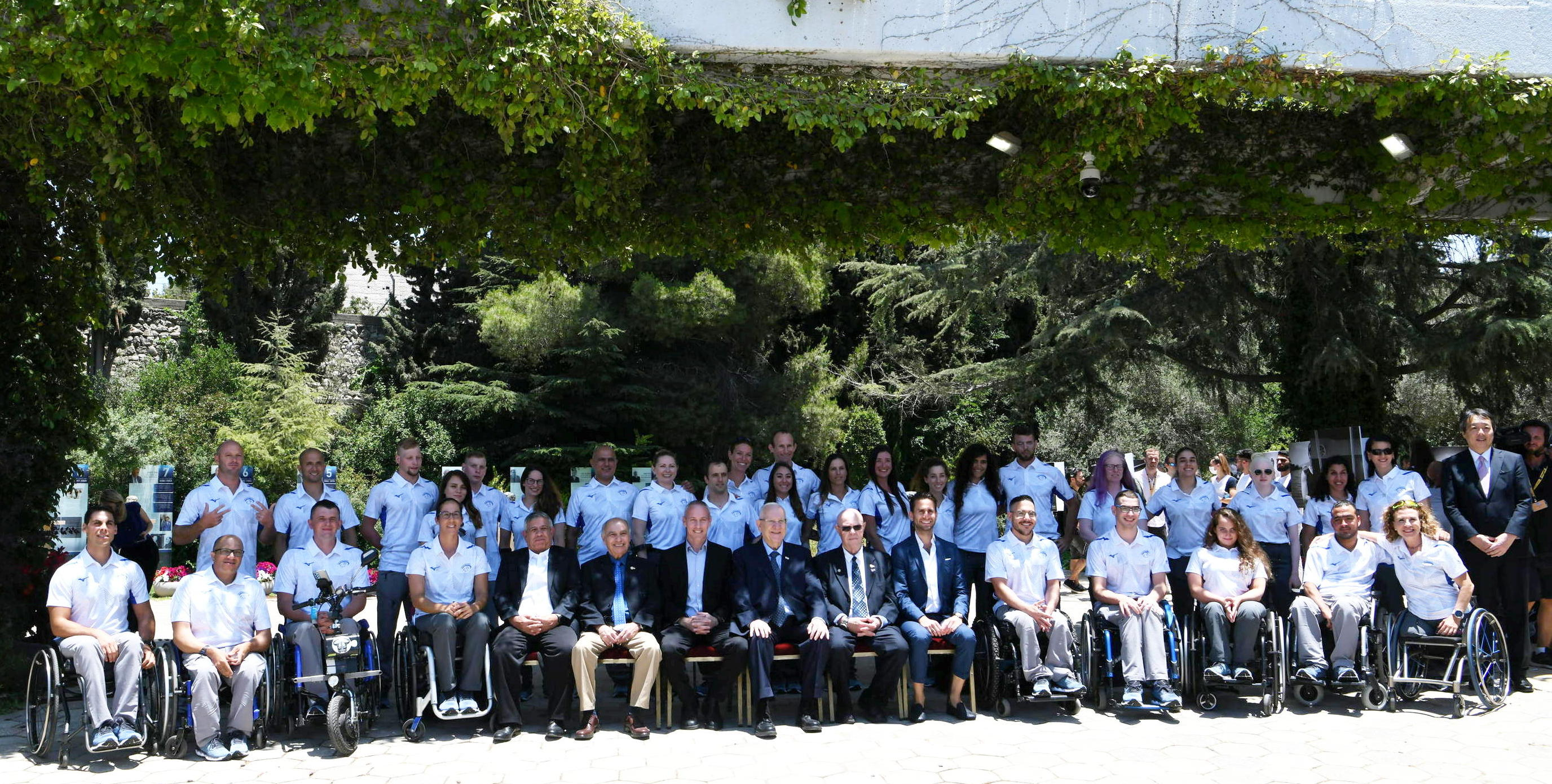
Israeli paralympics team, 2020

Host nation

Games	Gold	Silver	Bronze	Total	Rank
(Italy) 1960 Rome	0	2	2	4	16
(Japan) 1964 Tokyo	7	3	11	21	7
(Israel) 1968 Tel Aviv	18	21	23	62	3
(Germany) 1972 Heidelberg	9	10	9	28	8
(Canada) 1976 Toronto	40	13	16	69	3
(Netherlands) 1980 Arnhem	13	18	15	46	12
(United States) (United Kingdom) 1984 New York/Stoke Mandeville	11	21	12	44	19
(South Korea) 1988 Seoul	15	14	16	45	18
(Spain) 1992 Barcelona	2	4	5	11	38
(United States) 1996 Atlanta	0	4	5	9	52
(Australia) 2000 Sydney	3	2	1	6	37
(Greece) 2004 Athens	4	4	5	13	32
(China) 2008 Beijing	0	5	1	6	53
(United Kingdom) 2012 London	1	2	5	8	45
(Brazil) 2016 Rio de Janeiro	0	0	3	3	74
(Japan) 2020 Tokyo	6	2	1	9	22
(France) 2024 Paris	4	2	4	10	29
17	133	127	134	394	18

== Multi-medallists ==
No.	Athlete	Sport(s)	Years	Games	Sex	Gold	Silver	Bronze	Total
1	Zipora Rubin-Rosenbaum	Athletics, Swimming, Wheelchair basketball, Table tennis	1964–1992	Summer	F	15	9	7	31
2	Uri Bergman	Swimming	1976–1988	Summer	M	12	1	2	15
3	Joseph Wengier	Swimming	1976–1988	Summer	M	9	4	5	18
4	Baruch Hagai	Wheelchair basketball, Swimming, Table tennis	1964–1980	Summer	M	8	2	3	13
5	Shlomo Pinto	Swimming, Wheelchair basketball	1976–1988	Summer	M	7	9	2	18
6	Moshe Levy (athlete)	Swimming, Wheelchair basketball	1968–1988	Summer	M	7	4	2	13
7	Ayala Malhan	Wheelchair basketball, fencing	1968–1988	Summer	F	5	4	4	13
8	Ora Anlen	Athletics, Swimming, Wheelchair basketball	1968–1976	Summer	F	4	6	4	14
9	Batia Mishani	Athletics, Swimming, Table tennis	1964–1968	Summer	F	4	5	3	12
10	Malka Potashnik	Wheelchair basketball, Athletics, Swimming	1968–1988	Summer	F	4	5	1	10
11	Ami Omer Dadaon	Swimming	2020–2024	Summer	M	4	2	1	7
12	Mark Malyar	Swimming	2020–2024	Summer	M	3	0	1	4
13	Asaf Yasur	Taekwondo	2020–2024	Summer	M	1	0	0	1

== See also ==
- Paralympic competitors for Israel
- Sports in Israel
- Israel at the Olympics
