= Poland at the 1992 Summer Paralympics =

- IPC code: POL
- NPC: Polish Paralympic Committee
- Website: www.paralympic.org.pl

in Barcelona
- Competitors: 40
- Medals Ranked 16th: Gold 10 Silver 12 Bronze 10 Total 32

Summer Paralympics appearances (overview)
- 1972; 1976; 1980; 1984; 1988; 1992; 1996; 2000; 2004; 2008; 2012; 2016; 2020; 2024

Poland competed at the 1992 Summer Paralympics in Barcelona, Spain. 40 competitors from Poland won 32 medals including 10 gold, 12 silver and 10 bronze and finished 14th in the medal table.

== See also ==
- Poland at the Paralympics
- Poland at the 1992 Summer Olympics
