= Polish Paralympic Committee =

National Olympic committee of Poland

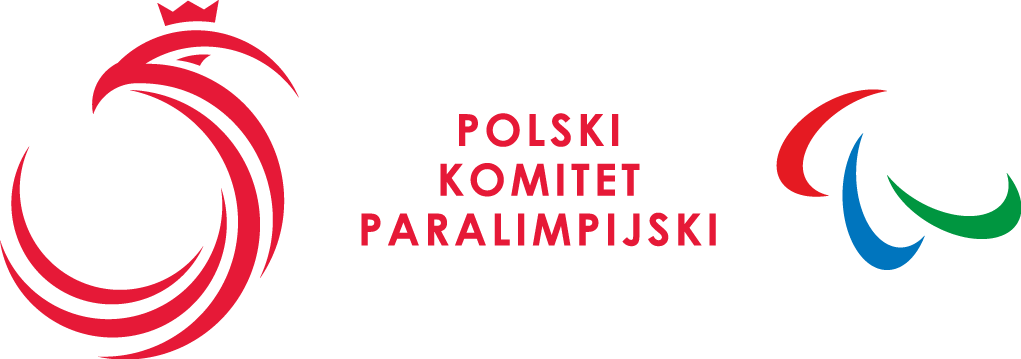

National Paralympic Committee
- Country: Poland
- Code: POL
- Created: 1998
- Continental association: EPC
- Headquarters: Warsaw
- President: Łukasz Szeliga
- Secretary General: Paulina Malinowska-Kowalczyk
- Website: paralympic.org.pl

The Polish Paralympic Committee (Polish: Polski Komitet Paralimpijski, official acronym PKPar) is the National Paralympic Committee representing Poland.

The committee has existed since 1998. The initiators of the establishment of PKPar were the Polish Disabled Sports Association (Polish: Polski Związek Sportu Niepełnosprawnych, "Start"), the Polish Social and Sports Association (Polish: Polskie Towarzystwo Społeczno-Sportowe, "Sprawni Razem") and the Disabled Health Protection Foundation (Polish: Fundacja Ochrony Zdrowia Inwalidów). PKPar is a member of the International Paralympic Committee (IPC) and the European Paralympic Committee (EPC). The basic goals of the committee are promoting the idea of Paralympism, co-organizing the Paralympic movement in Poland and securing the formal participation of Polish athletes in the Paralympic Games.

== Authorities and members ==
The committee's activities are managed by the board (consisting of 12–19 people), elected for a four-year term. The president of PKPar since 2015 is Łukasz Szeliga. Paulina Malinowska-Kowalczyk was appointed as secretary general in 2020; she had previously served as the organisation's spokesperson.

Presidents of the Polish Paralympic Committee:

- Jacek Dębski (1998−2000)
- Longin Komołowski (2000−2015)
- Łukasz Szeliga (since 2015)

Members of the Polish Paralympic Committee:

- Polish Disabled Sports Association (Polish: Polski Związek Sportu Niepełnosprawnych, "Start")
- Association of Sports Associations (Polish: Związek Stowarzyszeń Sportowych, "Sprawni Razem")
- Active Rehabilitation Foundation (Polish: Fundacja Aktywnej Rehabilitacji, "FAR")
- Association of Physical Culture, Sports and Tourism for the Blind and Partially Sighted (Polish: Stowarzyszenie Kultury Fizycznej, Sportu i Turystyki Niewidomych i Słabowidzących, "Cross")
- Physical Culture Association (Polish: Związek Kultury Fizycznej, "Olimp")
- Polish Boccia Federation (Polish: Polską Federację Bocci)
- Polish Wheelchair Rugby Association (Polish: Polski Związek Rugby na Wózkach)
- Polish Table Tennis Association (Polish: Polski Związek Tenisa Stołowego)

== Name ==
In February 2023, in connection with the IPC guidelines, the name of the association was changed from Polski Komitet Paraolimpijski to Polski Komitet Paralimpijski.

== See also ==
- Poland at the Paralympics
- Polish Olympic Committee
