= Israel at the 1992 Summer Paralympics =

- IPC code: ISR
- NPC: Israel Paralympic Committee
- Website: www.isad.org.il

in Barcelona
- Medals Ranked 38th: Gold 2 Silver 4 Bronze 5 Total 11

Summer Paralympics appearances (overview)
- 1960; 1964; 1968; 1972; 1976; 1980; 1984; 1988; 1992; 1996; 2000; 2004; 2008; 2012; 2016; 2020; 2024

Israel sent a delegation to compete at the 1992 Summer Paralympics in Barcelona, Catalonia, Spain. Its athletes finished 38th in the overall medal count.
