= Poland at the 1988 Summer Paralympics =

- IPC code: POL
- NPC: Polish Paralympic Committee
- Website: www.paralympic.org.pl

in Seoul
- Competitors: 47
- Medals Ranked 9th: Gold 23 Silver 25 Bronze 33 Total 81

Summer Paralympics appearances (overview)
- 1972; 1976; 1980; 1984; 1988; 1992; 1996; 2000; 2004; 2008; 2012; 2016; 2020; 2024

Poland competed at the 1988 Summer Paralympics in Seoul, South Korea. 47 competitors from Poland won 81 medals including 23 gold, 25 silver and 33 bronze and finished 9th in the medal table.

== See also ==
- Poland at the Paralympics
- Poland at the 1988 Summer Olympics
