= Israel at the 1980 Summer Paralympics =

- IPC code: ISR
- NPC: Israel Paralympic Committee
- Website: www.isad.org.il

in Arnhem
- Medals Ranked 12th: Gold 13 Silver 18 Bronze 15 Total 46

Summer Paralympics appearances (overview)
- 1960; 1964; 1968; 1972; 1976; 1980; 1984; 1988; 1992; 1996; 2000; 2004; 2008; 2012; 2016; 2020; 2024

Israel sent a delegation to compete at the 1980 Summer Paralympics in Arnhem, Netherlands. Its athletes finished twelfth in the overall medal count.
