= Israel at the 1984 Summer Paralympics =

- IPC code: ISR
- NPC: Israel Paralympic Committee
- Website: www.isad.org.il

in Stoke Mandeville/New York
- Medals Ranked 19th: Gold 11 Silver 21 Bronze 12 Total 44

Summer Paralympics appearances (overview)
- 1960; 1964; 1968; 1972; 1976; 1980; 1984; 1988; 1992; 1996; 2000; 2004; 2008; 2012; 2016; 2020; 2024

Israel sent a delegation to compete at the 1984 Summer Paralympics in Stoke Mandeville, United Kingdom and Long Island, New York, United States of America. Its athletes finished 19th in the overall medal count. It won 11 gold, 21 silver and 12 bronze medals.
