= Germany at the 1992 Summer Paralympics =

- IPC code: GER
- NPC: National Paralympic Committee Germany
- Website: www.dbs-npc.de (in German)

in Barcelona
- Competitors: 238
- Medals Ranked 2nd: Gold 61 Silver 51 Bronze 59 Total 171

Summer Paralympics appearances (overview)
- 1960; 1964; 1968; 1972; 1976; 1980; 1984; 1988; 1992; 1996; 2000; 2004; 2008; 2012; 2016; 2020; 2024

Other related appearances
- East Germany (1984)

Germany competed at the 1992 Summer Paralympics in Barcelona, Spain. 238 competitors from Germany won 171 medals including 61 gold, 51 silver and 59 bronze and finished 2nd in the medal table.

== Medalists ==
=== Gold medalists ===
Medal	Name	Sport	Event
Gold	Karl Bahls; Hermann Nortmann; Udo Wolf	Archery	Men's teams AR2
Gold	Peter Haber	Athletics	Men's 100m C7
Gold	Uwe Mehlmann	Athletics	Men's 200m B3
Gold	Peter Haber	Athletics	Men's 200m C7
Gold	Peter Haber	Athletics	Men's 400m C7
Gold	Markus Pilz	Athletics	Men's 400m TW3
Gold	Heinrich Koeberle	Athletics	Men's marathon TW1
Gold	Robert Figl; Guido Mueller; Markus Pilz; Winfried Sigg	Athletics	Men's 4x100m relay TW3-4
Gold	Gunther Belitz	Athletics	Men's long jump J1
Gold	Horst Beyer	Athletics	Men's discus throw THS2
Gold	Joerg Frischmann	Athletics	Men's shot put THS2
Gold	Siegmund Hegeholz	Athletics	Men's javelin throw B2
Gold	Roberto Simonazzi	Athletics	Men's pentathlon PS3
Gold	Jessica Sachse	Athletics	Women's 100m TS4
Gold	Jessica Sachse	Athletics	Women's 200m TS4
Gold	Lily Anggreny	Athletics	Women's 5000m TW3-4
Gold	Marianne Buggenhagen	Athletics	Women's discus throw THW5
Gold	Martina Willing	Athletics	Women's javelin throw B1-3
Gold	Marianne Buggenhagen	Athletics	Women's javelin throw THW5
Gold	Marianne Buggenhagen	Athletics	Women's shot put THW5
Gold	Marianne Buggenhagen	Athletics	Women's pentathlon PW3-4
Gold	Thomas Beer	Cycling	Men's 5km time trial bicycle CP div 3
Gold	Hans-Jorg Furrer; Frank Hoefle	Cycling	Men's tandem open
Gold	Bernd Vogel	Powerlifting	Men's -82.5kg
Gold	Aloys Schneider	Shooting	Men's air rifle standing SH1
Gold	Johann Brunner	Shooting	Mixed air rifle 3x40 SH2
Gold	Siegmar Henker	Shooting	Mixed air rifle 3x40 SH3
Gold	Aloys Schneider	Shooting	Mixed English Match SH1-3
Gold	Siegmar Henker	Shooting	Mixed Olympic Match SH3
Gold	Geert Jaehrig	Swimming	Men's 100m backstroke S8
Gold	Bernd Eickemeyer	Swimming	Men's 100m breaststroke SB3
Gold	Matthias Schlubeck	Swimming	Men's 100m breaststroke SB6
Gold	Jochen Hahnengress	Swimming	Men's 100m breaststroke SB10
Gold	Holger Woelk	Swimming	Men's 100m freestyle S9
Gold	Jochen Hahnengress; Geert Jaehrig; Detlef Schmidt; Holger Woelk	Swimming	Men's 4x100m medley relay S7-10
Gold	Beate Schretzmann	Swimming	Women's 50m butterfly S6
Gold	Daniela Pohl	Swimming	Women's 50m freestyle S7
Gold	Claudia Hengst	Swimming	Women's 50m freestyle S10
Gold	Daniela Pohl	Swimming	Women's 100m backstroke S7
Gold	Britta Siegers	Swimming	Women's 100m backstroke S8
Gold	Britta Siegers	Swimming	Women's 100m breaststroke SB6-7
Gold	Claudia Hengst	Swimming	Women's 100m butterfly S10
Gold	Daniela Pohl	Swimming	Women's 100m freestyle S7
Gold	Claudia Hengst	Swimming	Women's 100m freestyle S10
Gold	Yvonne Hopf	Swimming	Women's 200m individual medley B3
Gold	Britta Siegers	Swimming	Women's 200m individual medley SM8
Gold	Britta Siegers	Swimming	Women's 400m freestyle S8
Gold	Claudia Hengst	Swimming	Women's 400m individual medley B1-3
Gold	Claudia Hengst; Beate Lobenstein; Britta Siegers; Daniela Sjoberg	Swimming	Women's 4x100m medley relay S7-10
Gold	Thomas Kreidel	Table tennis	Men's singles 4
Gold	Rainer Schmidt	Table tennis	Men's singles 6
Gold	Michael Gerke	Table tennis	Men's singles 10
Gold	Thomas Kreidel; Karl-Heinz Weber	Table tennis	Men's teams 5
Gold	Michael Gerke; Marcus Vahle; C. Windecker	Table tennis	Men's teams 10
Gold	Christiane Weninger	Table tennis	Women's open 1-5
Gold	Monika Sikora	Table tennis	Women's singles 4
Gold	Gisela Roosen	Table tennis	Women's singles 5
Gold	Monika Bartheidel; Ruth Lamsbach	Table tennis	Women's teams 3
Gold	Rudolf Durrer; Josef Giebel; Pavo Grgic; Bernd Heinrich; Andreas Johann; Stefan Kaiser; Manfred Kohl; Oliver Mueller; Bernard Schmidl; Rudolf Schwietering; Elmar Sommer; Karl-Josef Weißenfels	Volleyball	Men's standing
Gold	Wolfgang Kempf	Wheelchair fencing	Men's sabre 3-4
Gold	Esther Weber	Wheelchair fencing	Women's épée 2

=== Silver medalists ===
Medal	Name	Sport	Event
Silver	Hermann Nortmann	Archery	Men's individual AR2
Silver	Uwe Mehlmann	Athletics	Men's 100m B3
Silver	Hans Lubbering	Athletics	Men's 100m TW1
Silver	Ingo Geffers	Athletics	Men's 200m B2
Silver	Hans Lubbering	Athletics	Men's 400m TW1
Silver	Johann Kastner	Athletics	Men's 800m TW2
Silver	Johann Kastner	Athletics	Men's 5000m TW2
Silver	Markus Pilz	Athletics	Men's 5000m TW3-4
Silver	Peter Haber	Athletics	Men's long jump C7-8
Silver	Siegmund Turteltaube	Athletics	Men's discus throw B1
Silver	Joerg Frischmann	Athletics	Men's javelin throw THS2
Silver	Detlef Eckert	Athletics	Men's shot put THS2
Silver	Cornelia Teubner	Athletics	Women's 100m C5-6
Silver	Claudia Meier	Athletics	Women's 400m B2
Silver	Claudia Meier	Athletics	Women's 800m B2
Silver	Claudia Meier	Athletics	Women's 1500m B2
Silver	Claudia Meier	Athletics	Women's 3000m B2
Silver	Lily Anggreny	Athletics	Women's 10000m TW3-4
Silver	Anette Burger	Athletics	Women's long jump B1
Silver	Martina Willing	Athletics	Women's discus throw B1
Silver	Johann Brunner	Shooting	Men's air rifle standing SH2
Silver	Johann Brunner	Shooting	Mixed Olympic Match SH2
Silver	Johann Brunner	Shooting	Mixed SB free rifle 3x40 SH1-2
Silver	Lars Luerig	Swimming	Men's 50m breaststroke SB2
Silver	Holger Kimmig	Swimming	Men's 100m backstroke S8
Silver	Detlef Schmidt	Swimming	Men's 100m backstroke S9
Silver	Holger Woelk	Swimming	Men's 100m breaststroke SB8
Silver	Stefan Loeffler	Swimming	Men's 100m breaststroke SB10
Silver	Jochen Hahnengress; Holger Kimmig; Raimund Patzelt; Holger Woelk	Swimming	Men's 4x100m freestyle relay S7-10
Silver	Yvonne Hopf	Swimming	Women's 50m freestyle B3
Silver	Britta Siegers	Swimming	Women's 50m freestyle S8
Silver	Beate Lobenstein	Swimming	Women's 50m freestyle S9
Silver	Yvonne Hopf	Swimming	Women's 100m backstroke B3
Silver	Claudia Hengst	Swimming	Women's 100m backstroke S10
Silver	Heidi Kopp	Swimming	Women's 100m breaststroke SB6-7
Silver	Britta Siegers	Swimming	Women's 100m freestyle S8
Silver	Claudia Hengst	Swimming	Women's 200m individual medley SM10
Silver	Michael Gerke	Table tennis	Men's open 6-10
Silver	Ralf Kirchhoff	Table tennis	Men's singles 1
Silver	Thomas Kurfess	Table tennis	Men's singles 7
Silver	Manfred Knabe	Table tennis	Men's singles 9
Silver	Werner Dorr; Rainer Kolb	Table tennis	Men's teams 3
Silver	Rainer Schmidt; Winfried Stelzner	Table tennis	Men's teams 6
Silver	Monika Bartheidel	Table tennis	Women's singles 3
Silver	Christiane Weninger	Table tennis	Women's singles 4
Silver	Gisela Pohle; Gisela Roosen; Monika Sikora; Christiane Weninger	Table tennis	Women's teams 5
Silver	Tamer Artan; Georg Beschler; Wolfgang Hollhorst; Jurgen Julius; Abdulgazi Karaman; Armin Kinzelmann; Paul Kuhnreich; Frank Michael; Manfred Mikschy; Horst Rodig; Thomas Schafer; Hans Schumacher	Wheelchair basketball	Men's team
Silver	Wilfried Lipinski	Wheelchair fencing	Men's épée 3-4
Silver	Uwe Bartmann; Dieter Leicht; Wilfried Lipinski; Udo Schwarz	Wheelchair fencing	Men's team épée
Silver	Uwe Bartmann; Wolfgang Kempf; Wilfried Lipinski; Guenter Spiess	Wheelchair fencing	Men's team sabre
Silver	Kai Schramayer	Wheelchair tennis	Men's singles

=== Bronze medalists ===
Medal	Name	Sport	Event
Bronze	Udo Wolf	Archery	Men's individual AR2
Bronze	Gunther Belitz	Athletics	Men's 100m TS1
Bronze	Robert Figl	Athletics	Men's 100m TW4
Bronze	Hans Lubbering	Athletics	Men's 200m TW1
Bronze	Robert Figl	Athletics	Men's 200m TW4
Bronze	Ingo Geffers	Athletics	Men's 400m B2
Bronze	Heinrich Koeberle	Athletics	Men's 5000m TW1
Bronze	Markus Pilz	Athletics	Men's 10000m TW3-4
Bronze	Robert Figl; Guido Mueller; Markus Pilz; Winfried Sigg	Athletics	Men's 4x400m relay TW3-4
Bronze	Olaf Mehlmann	Athletics	Men's high jump B3
Bronze	Uwe Mehlmann	Athletics	Men's long jump B3
Bronze	Ulrich Striegel	Athletics	Men's triple jump B3
Bronze	Roberto Simonazzi	Athletics	Men's discus throw THS2
Bronze	Hubertus Brauner	Athletics	Men's discus throw THW4
Bronze	Hubert Burschgens	Athletics	Men's javelin throw THS2
Bronze	Dirk Mimberg	Athletics	Men's javelin throw THS3
Bronze	Dirk Mimberg	Athletics	Men's shot put THS3
Bronze	Max Bergbauer	Athletics	Men's shot put THS4
Bronze	Hubertus Brauner	Athletics	Men's shot put THW4
Bronze	Detlef Eckert	Athletics	Men's pentathlon PS3
Bronze	Barbara Maier	Athletics	Women's 5000m TW3-4
Bronze	Lily Anggreny	Athletics	Women's marathon TW3-4
Bronze	Kerstin Gaedicke	Athletics	Women's long jump B1
Bronze	Ilona Thomas	Athletics	Women's discus throw B3
Bronze	Martina Willing	Athletics	Women's shot put B1
Bronze	Manfred Fischer; Hans-Jorg Furrer; Frank Hoefle; Friedhelm Welz	Cycling	Men's team time trial tandem open
Bronze	Klaus Heyer	Judo	Men's -95kg
Bronze	Siegmar Henker	Shooting	Mixed air rifle standing SH1-3
Bronze	Aloys Schneider	Shooting	Mixed SB free rifle 3x40 SH1-2
Bronze	Holger Kimmig	Swimming	Men's 50m freestyle S8
Bronze	Jochen Hahnengress	Swimming	Men's 50m freestyle S10
Bronze	Matthias Schlubeck	Swimming	Men's 100m backstroke S6
Bronze	Jan-Marcin Miroslaw	Swimming	Men's 100m breaststroke SB8
Bronze	Holger Kimmig	Swimming	Men's 100m freestyle S8
Bronze	Holger Kimmig	Swimming	Men's 400m freestyle S8
Bronze	Beate Schretzmann	Swimming	Women's 100m breaststroke SB6-7
Bronze	Beate Lobenstein	Swimming	Women's 100m breaststroke SB9
Bronze	Yvonne Hopf	Swimming	Women's 100m butterfly B2-3
Bronze	Yvonne Hopf	Swimming	Women's 100m freestyle B3
Bronze	Heidi Kopp	Swimming	Women's 200m individual medley SM8
Bronze	Beate Lobenstein	Swimming	Women's 200m individual medley SM9
Bronze	Claudia Hengst; Beate Lobenstein; Britta Siegers; Daniela Sjoberg	Swimming	Women's 4x100m freestyle relay S7-10
Bronze	Bruno Hassler	Table tennis	Men's singles 2
Bronze	Jochen Wollmert	Table tennis	Men's singles 7
Bronze	Werner Maissenbacher	Table tennis	Men's singles 8
Bronze	Dieter Essbach; Ralf Kirchhoff	Table tennis	Men's teams 1
Bronze	Bruno Hassler; Helmut Sperling	Table tennis	Men's teams 2
Bronze	Gunter Altenburg; Winfried Huhn	Table tennis	Men's teams 4
Bronze	Florian Lechner; Werner Maissenbacher; Rainer Schmidt; Jochen Wollmert	Table tennis	Men's teams 8
Bronze	Wolfgang Horsch; Manfred Knabe; Thomas Kurfess; Dieter Tollwerth	Table tennis	Men's teams 9
Bronze	Ruth Lamsbach	Table tennis	Women's singles 3
Bronze	Christa Gebhardt; U. Lindgens-Strach	Table tennis	Women's teams 10
Bronze	Steffen Barsch; Rolf Elbrachter; Jens Faerber; Joerg Gaetje; Robert Grylak; Bert Jasper; Michael Konrad; Gunther Kruger; Siegmund Soicke; Frank Spremberg; Ferenc Stettner; Joachim Wahl	Volleyball	Men's sitting
Bronze	Uwe Bartmann	Wheelchair fencing	Men's épée 2
Bronze	Wolfgang Kempf; Dieter Leicht; Maximilian Miller; Guenter Spiess	Wheelchair fencing	Men's team foil
Bronze	Wilfried Lipinski	Wheelchair fencing	Men's sabre 3-4
Bronze	Esther Weber	Wheelchair fencing	Women's foil 2
Bronze	Stefan Bitterauf; Kai Schramayer	Wheelchair tennis	Men's doubles
Bronze	Regina Isecke	Wheelchair tennis	Women's singles

== See also ==
- Germany at the Paralympics
- Germany at the 1992 Summer Olympics
