= Athletics at the 1992 Summer Paralympics – Men's discus throw THS2 =

Men's discus throw THS2 at the IX Paralympic Games
- Paralympic Athletics
- Venue: Estadi Olímpic de Montjuïc
- Dates: September 1992
- Competitors: 23 from 14 nations

Medalists
1st place, gold medalist(s)		Horst Beyer	Germany
2nd place, silver medalist(s)		John Eden	Australia
3rd place, bronze medalist(s)		Roberto Simonazzi	Germany

The Men's discus throw THS2 was a field event in athletics at the 1992 Summer Paralympics, for athletes with missing limbs.

== Results ==
=== Final ===
Place	Athlete	Width
1	Horst Beyer (GER)	40.84
2	John Eden (AUS)	
3	Roberto Simonazzi (GER)	
4	Mohamed Ahmed (EGY)	
5	Franz Pfeifer (AUT)	
6	Viktar Khilmonchyk (IPP)	
7	Guillermo Pérez (CUB)	
8	Aldis Šūpulnieks (LAT)	
9	Nachman Wolf (ISR)	
10	Kerrod McGregor (AUS)	
11	Gino de Keersmaeker (BEL)	
12	Adnan Al-Khulefi (KUW)	
13	Husain Al-Enezi (KUW)	
14	Andres Garcia (ESP)	
15	Didier Simons (BEL)	
16	Jason Willis (AUS)	
17	Robert Ward (USA)	
18	Ayad Al-Ali (KUW)	
19	Khalfan Al-Hedafi (OMA)	
-	Ernesto Garrido (CUB)	DNS
-	Rainer Guhl (GER)	NM
-	Fuh Hwan Lay (TPE)	NM
-	Juan Lebrero (ESP)	NM
