= Germany at the 1996 Summer Paralympics =

- IPC code: GER
- NPC: National Paralympic Committee Germany
- Website: www.dbs-npc.de (in German)

in Atlanta
- Competitors: 231 (153 men and 78 women)
- Medals Ranked 3rd: Gold 39 Silver 58 Bronze 56 Total 153

Summer Paralympics appearances (overview)
- 1960; 1964; 1968; 1972; 1976; 1980; 1984; 1988; 1992; 1996; 2000; 2004; 2008; 2012; 2016; 2020; 2024

Other related appearances
- East Germany (1984)

231 athletes (153 men and 78 women) from Germany competed at the 1996 Summer Paralympics in Atlanta, United States.

== Medallists ==
Medal	Name	Sport	Event
Gold	Hermann Nortmann; Mario Oehme; Udo Wolf	Archery	Men's teams W1/W2
Gold	Winfried Sigg	Athletics	Men's 400m T52
Gold	Heinrich Koeberle	Athletics	Men's marathon T50
Gold	Male athletes	Athletics	Men's 4 × 100 m relay T52-53
Gold	Andreas Mueller	Athletics	Men's discus F32-33
Gold	Joerg Schiedek	Athletics	Men's javelin F46
Gold	Horst Beyer	Athletics	Men's pentathlon P42
Gold	Marianne Buggenhagen	Athletics	Women's discus F53-54
Gold	Martina Willing	Athletics	Women's javelin F53-54
Gold	Birgit Pohl	Athletics	Women's shot put F32-33
Gold	Marianne Buggenhagen	Athletics	Women's shot put F53-54
Gold	Birgit Dreiszis	Equestrian	Mixed kur trot grade I
Gold	Martina Bethke; Cornelia Dietz; Gudula Demmelhuber; Edda Ewert; Christel Bettinger; Christine Krause	Goalball	Women's team
Gold	Bernd Vogel	Powerlifting	Men's 82.5 kg
Gold	Josef Neumaier	Shooting	Men's free rifle 3x40 SH1
Gold	Christian Fritsche	Swimming	Men's 50m breaststroke SB3
Gold	Holger Kimmig	Swimming	Men's 100m backstroke S8
Gold	Stefan Loeffler	Swimming	Men's 100m breaststroke SB10
Gold	Lars Lürig	Swimming	Men's 200m freestyle S5
Gold	Holger Kimmig; Detlef Schmidt; Oliver Anders; Stefan Loeffler	Swimming	Men's 4 × 100 m freestyle S7-10
Gold	Holger Kimmig; Stefan Loeffler; Detlef Schmidt; Oliver Anders	Swimming	Men's 4 × 100 m medley S7-10
Gold	Kay Espenhayn	Swimming	Women's 50m backstroke S4
Gold	Maria Goetze	Swimming	Women's 50m butterfly S6
Gold	Yvonne Hopf	Swimming	Women's 50m freestyle B3
Gold	Claudia Hengst	Swimming	Women's 50m freestyle S10
Gold	Daniela Pohl	Swimming	Women's 50m freestyle S7
Gold	Yvonne Hopf	Swimming	Women's 100m backstroke B3
Gold	Yvonne Hopf	Swimming	Women's 100m freestyle B3
Gold	Claudia Hengst	Swimming	Women's 100m freestyle S10
Gold	Daniela Pohl	Swimming	Women's 100m freestyle S7
Gold	Kay Espenhayn	Swimming	Women's 150m medley SM4
Gold	Kay Espenhayn	Swimming	Women's 200m freestyle S4
Gold	Daniela Roehle; Birgit Beeker; Daniela Henke; Yvonne Hopf	Swimming	Women's 4 × 100 m freestyle B1-3
Gold	Daniela Roehle; Birgit Beeker; Yvonne Hopf; Daniela Henke	Swimming	Women's 4 × 100 m medley B1-3
Gold	Thomas Kreidel	Table tennis	Men's open 1-5
Gold	Thomas Kurfess; Jochen Wollmert; Thomas Schmitt; Werner Maissenbacher	Table tennis	Men's team 6-8
Gold	Christiane Pape	Table tennis	Women's open 1-5
Gold	Monika Bartheidel; Monika Sikora; Gisela Pohle; Christiane Pape	Table tennis	Women's teams 3-5
Gold	Rudolf Schwietering; Pavo Grgic; Manfred Kohl; Elmar Sommer; Jens Altmann; Stefan Kaiser; Karl-Josef Weißenfels; Oliver Mueller; Andreas Johann; Bernard Schmidl; Josef Giebel	Volleyball	Men's standing team
Gold	Silke Schwarz	Wheelchair fencing	Women's épée individual A
Silver	Peter Haber	Athletics	Men's 100m T36
Silver	Peter Haber	Athletics	Men's 200m T36
Silver	Markus Pilz	Athletics	Men's 400m T52
Silver	Gerd Franzka; Joerg Trippen-Hilgers; Ingo Geffers; Holger Geffers	Athletics	Men's 4x100 relay T10-12
Silver	Thomas Validis; Holger Geffers; Gerd Franzka; Ingo Geffers	Athletics	Men's 4 × 400 m relay T10-12
Silver	Peter Haber	Athletics	Men's long jump F34-37
Silver	Gunther Belitz	Athletics	Men's long jump F42
Silver	Florian Bohl	Athletics	Men's triple jump F45-46
Silver	Siegmund Turteltaube	Athletics	Men's discus F10
Silver	Horst Beyer	Athletics	Men's discus F42
Silver	Siegmund Hegeholz	Athletics	Men's javelin F11
Silver	Andreas Mueller	Athletics	Men's shot put F32-33
Silver	Detlef Eckert	Athletics	Men's shot put F42
Silver	Joerg Frischmann	Athletics	Men's shot put F43-44
Silver	Rayk Haucke	Athletics	Men's pentathlon P10
Silver	Claire Brunotte	Athletics	Women's 100m T11
Silver	Isabelle Foerder	Athletics	Women's 100m T36-37
Silver	Jessica Sachse	Athletics	Women's 100m T42-46
Silver	Claire Brunotte	Athletics	Women's 200m T11
Silver	Isabelle Foerder	Athletics	Women's 200m T34-37
Silver	Claudia Meier	Athletics	Women's 800m T10-11
Silver	Claudia Meier	Athletics	Women's 1500m T10-11
Silver	Claudia Meier	Athletics	Women's 3000m T10-11
Silver	Britta Jaenicke	Athletics	Women's shot put F42-44/46
Silver	Andreas Hillers	Cycling	Mixed 1500m time trial bicycle CP2
Silver	Wolfgang Mahler	Cycling	Mixed 65/75k bicycle LC1
Silver	Elfriede Ranz; Ursula Egner	Cycling	Women's time trial tandem open
Silver	Angelika Trabert	Equestrian	Mixed dressage grade II
Silver	Angelika Trabert	Equestrian	Kur trot grade II
Silver	Josef Neumaier	Shooting	Men's air rifle 3x40 SH1
Silver	Christian Fritsche	Swimming	Men's 50m butterfly S4
Silver	Lars Lürig	Swimming	Men's 50m freestyle S5
Silver	Stefan Loeffler	Swimming	Men's 50m freestyle S10
Silver	Lars Lürig	Swimming	Men's 100m freestyle S5
Silver	Holger Kimmig	Swimming	Men's 100m freestyle S8
Silver	Stefan Loeffler	Swimming	Men's 100m freestyle S10
Silver	Holger Kimmig	Swimming	Men's 200m medley SM8
Silver	Stefan Loeffler	Swimming	Men's 400m freestyle S10
Silver	Holger Kimmig	Swimming	Men's 400m freestyle S8
Silver	Beate Schretzmann	Swimming	Women's 50m butterfly S6
Silver	Daniela Henke	Swimming	Women's 50m freestyle B3
Silver	Kay Espenhayn	Swimming	Women's 50m freestyle S4
Silver	Daniela Henke	Swimming	Women's 100m breaststroke B3
Silver	Beate Schretzmann	Swimming	Women's 100m breaststroke SB7
Silver	Daniela Henke	Swimming	Women's 100m butterfly B3
Silver	Daniela Roehle	Swimming	Women's 100m freestyle B1
Silver	Daniela Henke	Swimming	Women's 100m freestyle B3
Silver	Annke Conradi	Swimming	Women's 100m freestyle S3
Silver	Kay Espenhayn	Swimming	Women's 100m freestyle S4
Silver	Daniela Roehle	Swimming	Women's 200m medley B1
Silver	Yvonne Hopf	Swimming	Women's 200m medley B3
Silver	Maria Goetze	Swimming	Women's 200m medley SM6
Silver	Daniela Pohl; Claudia Hengst; Anna Brinck; Beate Lobenstein	Swimming	Women's 4 × 100 m medley S7-10
Silver	Jochen Wollmert	Table tennis	Men's singles 7
Silver	Monika Bartheidel	Table tennis	Women's singles 3
Silver	Christiane Pape	Table tennis	Women's singles 4
Silver	Wilfried Lipinski	Wheelchair fencing	Men's sabre individual A
Silver	Esther Weber-Kranz; Jutta Jacob; Silke Schwarz; Monika Hertrich	Wheelchair fencing	Women's épée team
Bronze	Udo Wolf	Archery	Men's individual W2
Bronze	Holger Geffers	Athletics	Men's 200m T11
Bronze	Lothar Overesch	Athletics	Men's 200m T42
Bronze	Wolfgang Petersen	Athletics	Men's 200m T52
Bronze	Ingo Geffers	Athletics	Men's 400m T11
Bronze	Juergen Kern	Athletics	Men's high jump F42-44
Bronze	Ulrich Striegel	Athletics	Men's triple jump F12
Bronze	Klaus Kulla	Athletics	Men's discus F43-44
Bronze	Thomas Validis	Athletics	Men's javelin F12
Bronze	Roberto Simonazzi	Athletics	Men's javelin F42
Bronze	Dirk Mimberg	Athletics	Men's javelin F43-44
Bronze	Horst Beyer	Athletics	Men's shot put F42
Bronze	Cornelia Teubner	Athletics	Women's 100m T34-35
Bronze	Lily Anggreny	Athletics	Women's 10000m T52-53
Bronze	Carmen Storch	Athletics	Women's long jump F34-37
Bronze	Britta Jaenicke	Athletics	Women's discus F42-44/46
Bronze	Martina Willing	Athletics	Women's discus F53-54
Bronze	Marianne Buggenhagen	Athletics	Women's javelin F53-54
Bronze	Martina Willing	Athletics	Women's shot put F53-54
Bronze	Martin Boesch; Frank Hoefle	Cycling	Men's 100/120k tandem open
Bronze	Roland Hartmann	Shooting	Mixed sport pistol SH1
Bronze	Alfred Berniger	Shooting	Men's air rifle 3x40m SH1
Bronze	Sabine Brogle	Shooting	Women's air rifle 3x20 SH1
Bronze	Franz Falke	Shooting	Men's air rifle standing SH1
Bronze	Sabine Brogle	Shooting	Women's standard rifle 3x20 SH1
Bronze	Holger Kimmig	Swimming	Men's 50m freestyle S8
Bronze	Geert Jaehrig	Swimming	Men's 100m backstroke S8
Bronze	Detlef Schmidt	Swimming	Men's 100m backstroke S9
Bronze	Mario Kofler	Swimming	Men's 100m breaststroke SB10
Bronze	Matthias Schlubeck	Swimming	Men's 100m breaststroke SB6
Bronze	Stefan Loeffler	Swimming	Men's 200m medley SM10
Bronze	Thomas Grimm	Swimming	Men's 200m medley SM6
Bronze	Annke Conradi	Swimming	Women's 50m backstroke S3
Bronze	Kay Espenhayn	Swimming	Women's 50m breaststroke SB3
Bronze	Annke Conradi	Swimming	Women's 50m freestyle S3
Bronze	Birgit Beeker	Swimming	Women's 200m medley B2
Bronze	Claudia Hengst	Swimming	Women's 200m medley SM10
Bronze	Claudia Hengst	Swimming	Women's 400m freestyle S10
Bronze	Beate Lobenstein; Daniela Pohl; Stephanie Puetz; Claudia Hengst	Swimming	Women's 4 × 100 m freestyle S7-10
Bronze	Thomas Kriedel	Table tennis	Men's singles 4
Bronze	Thomas Kurfess	Table tennis	Men's singles 7
Bronze	Dieter Essbach; Werner Knaak; Udo Pohle; Otto Vilsmeier	Table tennis	Men's team 1-2
Bronze	Jan Guertler; Werner Dorr	Table tennis	Men's teams 3
Bronze	Bernd Mueller; Peter Faehnrich; Andre Schmandt	Table tennis	Men's teams 9-10
Bronze	Baerbel Rode	Table tennis	Women's singles 1-2
Bronze	Gisela Pohle	Table tennis	Women's singles 5
Bronze	Wilfried Lipinski	Wheelchair fencing	Men's épée individual A
Bronze	Maximilian Miller; Uwe Bartmann; Wilfried Lipinski; Wolfgang Kempf	Wheelchair fencing	Men's sabre team
Bronze	Esther Weber-Kranz	Wheelchair fencing	Women's épée individual B
Bronze	Esther Weber-Kranz	Wheelchair fencing	Women's foil individual B
Bronze	Esther Weber-Kranz; Jutta Jacob; Silke Schwarz; Monika Hertrich	Wheelchair fencing	Women's foil team

== See also ==
- Germany at the Paralympics
- Germany at the 1996 Summer Olympics
