= Wheelchair fencing at the 2008 Summer Paralympics – Women's foil B =

Women's foil B at the XIII Paralympic Games
- Paralympic Wheelchair fencing
- Venue: Olympic Green Convention Center
- Dates: 14 September
- Competitors: 12 from 10 nations

Medalists
1st place, gold medalist(s)		Chan Yui Chong	Hong Kong
2nd place, silver medalist(s)		Yao Fang	China
3rd place, bronze medalist(s)		Ye Hua	China

The women's foil B wheelchair fencing competition at the 2008 Summer Paralympics was held on 14 September at the Olympic Green Convention Center.

The competition began with a preliminary stage where fencers were divided into two pools and played a round robin tournament. In this stage, the winner of a bout was the first person to score five hits or the person with the highest score at the end of four minutes. Next was a knock-out stage, where fencers competed in three three-minute bouts with a one-minute break between each. The winner was the first to reach fifteen hits, or the one with the highest score at the end of the last bout. In the event of a tie, another one-minute bout was held, with the winner being the first to score a hit.

The event was won by Chan Yui Chong, representing Hong Kong.

== Results ==
=== Preliminaries ===
==== Pool A ====
Rank	Competitor	MP	W	L	Points	HKG	CHN	THA	HUN	RUS	USA
1	Chan Yui Chong (HKG)	5	4	1	23:11	x	3:5	5:2	5:3	5:1	5:0
2	Ye Hua (CHN)	5	4	1	24:13	5:3	x	4:5	5:3	5:2	5:0
3	Saysunee Jana (THA)	5	4	1	22:11	2:5	5:4	x	5:1	5:1	5:0
4	Judit Palfi (HUN)	5	2	3	17:19	3:5	3:5	1:5	x	5:4	5:0
5	Liudmila Vasilyeva (RUS)	5	1	4	13:20	1:5	2:5	1:5	4:5	x	5:0
6	Andrea Demello (USA)	5	0	5	0:25	0:5	0:5	0:5	0:5	0:5	x

==== Pool B ====
Rank	Competitor	MP	W	L	Points	CHN	HUN	UKR	FRA	ESP	ITA
1	Yao Fang (CHN)	5	5	0	25:11	x	5:1	5:4	5:4	5:1	5:1
2	Gyongyi Dani (HUN)	5	4	1	21:16	1:5	x	5:3	5:3	5:2	5:3
3	Iryna Lukianenko (UKR)	5	3	2	22:13	4:5	3:5	x	5:1	5:2	5:0
4	Sylvie Magnat (FRA)	5	1	4	17:23	4:5	3:5	1:5	x	4:5	5:3
5	Gema Victoria Hassen Bey (ESP)	5	1	4	14:24	1:5	2:5	2:5	5:4	x	4:5
6	Rosalba Vettraino (ITA)	5	1	4	12:24	1:5	3:5	0:5	3:5	5:4	x

=== Competition bracket ===
Round of 16
Sylvie Magnat (FRA)	9
Liudmila Vasilyeva (RUS)	15

Quarterfinals
Yao Fang (CHN)	15
Liudmila Vasilyeva (RUS)	7
Gyongyi Dani (HUN)	8
Saysunee Jana (THA)	15
Ye Hua (CHN)	15
Iryna Lukianenko (UKR)	8
Judit Palfi (HUN)	4
Chan Yui Chong (HKG)	15

Semifinals
Yao Fang (CHN)	15
Saysunee Jana (THA)	11
Ye Hua (CHN)	5
Chan Yui Chong (HKG)	15

Final
Yao Fang (CHN)	8
Chan Yui Chong (HKG)	15
Third place
Saysunee Jana (THA)	14
Ye Hua (CHN)	15
