= Kulas =

Kulas is a surname. Notable people include:

- Bri Kulas (born 1992), American basketball player
- Eliezer Kulas (born 1944), Israeli politician
- Janusz Kulas (1936–1972), Polish anti-communist
- Marek Kulas (born 1963), Polish racing cyclist
- Michael Kulas (born 1969), Canadian musician
- Milan Kulas, Czech volleyball player
- Myron Kulas (born 1942), American politician

== See also ==
- Kulas, character in Philippine series Dyosa
