= Volleyball at the 1996 Summer Paralympics =

Volleyball at the X Paralympic Games
- Paralympic standing and sitting volleyball

Medalists
1st place, gold medalist(s)		Germany (GER) (standing); Iran (IRI) (sitting)
2nd place, silver medalist(s)		Slovakia (SVK) (standing); Norway (NOR) (sitting)
3rd place, bronze medalist(s)		Poland (POL) (standing); Finland (FIN) (sitting)

Paralympic symbol (1994-2004)

Volleyball at the 1996 Summer Paralympics in Atlanta consisted of standing and sitting volleyball events for men.

== Medal summary ==
Event	Gold	Silver	Bronze
Men's standing	Germany (GER) Jens Altmann; Josef Giebel; Pavo Grgic; Andreas Johann; Stefan Kaiser; Manfred Kohl; Oliver Mueller; Bernard Schmidl; Rudolf Schwietering; Elmar Sommer; Karl-Josef Weißenfels	Slovakia (SVK) Pavol Betin; Michal Csader; Richard Kovac; Jaroslav Makovnik; Andrej Marcin; Jozef Mihalco; Peter Moravcik; Michal Nestorik; Lubomir Novosad; Pavol Sedlak; Marek Tomsik	Poland (POL) Tadeusz Bogusz; Czeslaw Humerski; Andrzej Iwaniak; Jerzy Kruszelnicki; Stanislaw Leja; Jan Maliszak; Piotr Moszczynski; K. Mozdzynski; Roman Wanecki; Marian Warda; Tomasz Wozny; Adam Zawislak
Men's sitting	Iran (IRI) Gholam Akhavan; Farshid Ashouri; Mohsen Barati; Jalil Imeri; Parviz Firouzi; Ali Golkar; Ali Kashfia; Hadi Rezaei; Ali Akbar Salavatian; Hassan Shahi; Ahmad Shivani; Majid Soleimani	Norway (NOR) Bjarne Abrahamsen; Erik Halvorsen; Ole Hodnemyr; Lars Jensen; Kaare Lyse; Tomas Nesheim; Oeivind Olsen; Gaute Rostrup; Oeyvind Strand; Andreas Vennesland	Finland (FIN) Keijo Hanninen; Jari Heino; Petri Kapiainen Jukka Laine; Esa Liukkonen; Lauri Melanen; Pekka Norola; Matti Pulli; Reijo Salonen; Sami Tervo; Veli-Matti Tuominen; Lauri Venalainen

== Medal table ==
Rank	Nation	Gold	Silver	Bronze	Total
1	Germany (GER)	1	0	0	1
1	Iran (IRI)	1	0	0	1
3	Norway (NOR)	0	1	0	1
3	Slovakia (SVK)	0	1	0	1
5	Finland (FIN)	0	0	1	1
5	Poland (POL)	0	0	1	1
Totals (6 entries)		2	2	2	6

== Men's standing volleyball team rosters ==
Source: International Paralympic Committee

Czech Republic (CZE): Vladimir Duchacek; Jaromir Mourecek; Jiri Ozana; Jaromir Pinkava; Vaclav Seps; Zdenek Svoboda; Zdenek Vajgl; Michal Vapenka; Ladislav Vsolak; Ladislav Vytisk	France (FRA): Olivier Allo; Gilles Bidois; Cyril Blom; Eric Brand; Jean-Marie Buart; Christian Delpierre; Guy Devos; Marc Dupoyet; Jerome Garnier; Eric Masse; Bel Hadse Rezki; Ghavam Tolouie	Germany (GER): Jens Altmann; Josef Giebel; Pavo Grgic; Andreas Johann; Stefan Kaiser; Manfred Kohl; Oliver Mueller; Bernard Schmidl; Rudolf Schwietering; Elmar Sommer; Karl-Josef Weißenfels	Great Britain (GBR): Frederick Church; Gerard Dillon; Mark Fosbrook; Oliver Gutfleisch; Steven Johnson; David McCrae; Keith Oulton; Carl Richardson; Patrick Scott; Leslie Stoddart; Anthony Willis
Israel (ISR): Ronen Avivi; Yair Ben Dor; Jaime Fayntuch; Nisim Franko; Gil Haba; Eliezer Kalina; Zvi Karsh; Hagai Zamir; Chen Zhur	Poland (POL): Tadeusz Bogusz; Czeslaw Humerski; Andrzej Iwaniak; Jerzy Kruszelnicki; Stanislaw Leja; Jan Maliszak; Piotr Moszczynski; K. Mozdzynski; Roman Wanecki; Marian Warda; Tomasz Wozny; Adam Zawislak	Slovakia (SVK): Pavol Betin; Michal Csader; Richard Kovac; Jaroslav Makovnik; Andrej Marcin; Josef Mihalco; Peter Moravcik; Michal Nestorik; Lubomir Novosad; Pavol Sedlak; Marek Tomsik	United States (USA): Barry Hammer; Dennis Lee; Jeffrey Munn; Phillip Newkirk; Robert Osbahr; Douglas Ragsdale; Chris Seilkop; Thomas Sestanovich; Joe Sullivan; Dwight van Tassell; Michael Walters; Jeffrey Werner

== Men's sitting volleyball team rosters ==
Source: International Paralympic Committee

Argentina (ARG): Juan Aranda; Santiago Catacata; Natalio Kirstein; Guillermo Ortiz; Alberto Pedraza; Ricardo Perdiguero; Mario Reynoso; Enrique Tommaseo; Marcelo Vera; Pablo Videla	Finland (FIN): Keijo Hanninen; Jari Heino; Petri Kapiainen; Jukka Laine; Esa Liukkonen; Lauri Melanen; Pekka Norola; Matti Pulli; Reijo Salonen; Sami Tervo; Veli-Matti Tuominen; Lauri Venalainen	Germany (GER): Steffen Barsch; Ingo Busse; Jens Faerber; Joerg Gaetje; Robert Grylak; Uwe Haussig; Bert Jasper; Gunther Kruger; Juergen Schrapp; Dieter Schwanbeck; Siegmund Soicke; Ferenc Stettner	Hungary (HUN): Andras Domokos; Laszlo Kovacs; Tibor Laluja; Sandor Makarovszki; Attila Manyak; Jozsef Marosi; Janos Peres; Jozsef Stirczer; Laszlo Szabo; Lajos Szecsenyi
Iran (IRI): Gholam Akhavan Kharazian; Farshid Ashouri; Mohsen Barati Sarbandi Toro; Jalil Eimeri; Parviz Firouzi; Ali Golkar Azghandi; Ali Kashfia; Hadi Rezaeikarakani; Aliakbar Salavatian; Hassan Shahi; Ahmad Shivani Mahjori; Majid Soleimanikhoramdasht	Kazakhstan (KAZ): Nikolai Bukatov; Yrysbek Kamyssov; Sergey Khokhlov; Oman Klychbaev; Nikolay Kondratenko; Alexandr Kukatov; Nurraly Kulushov; Oraz Narbaev; Bakhit Sakbayev; Yoriy Subbota; Shalkar Tashkumbaev; G. Tchetverikov	Netherlands (NED): Joze Banfi; Gerard Broertjes; Ron Durge; Richard Gesell; Gerard Kroon; Harry Oomen; Johan Reekers; Gerard Spreeuwenberg; Pieter Top; Edwin van der Broek; Bjorn van Unen; Andre Venderbosch	Norway (NOR): Bjarne Abrahamsen; Erik Halvorsen; Ole Hodnemyr; Lars Jensen; Kaare Lyse; Tomas Nesheim; Oeivind Olsen; Gaute Rostrup; Oeyvind Strand; Andreas Vennesland
Russia (RUS): Gadje Abakarov; Alexandre Averine; S. Belokobylski; Eugueni Khanov; Denis Maltchikov; Radjab Mamayev; Mikhail Orechkine; Asgat Salakhov; Andrei Seliverstov; Maksim Sizov; Serguei Skobeline; Mikhail Zykov	Sweden (SWE): Mattias Appelqvist; Peter Berggren; John Bergstrom; Mikael Borg; Edris Husson; Per-Ola Jonsson; Jens Kask; Lars Lindeberg; Goran Lindelow; Kjell Nilsson; Sefko Nuhanovic; Eddie Stefors	Ukraine (UKR): O. Andriyashchenko; Anatolii Andrusenko; Ihor Bondar; O. Honcharneko; Vasyl Horovy; Oleksiy Hovorun; Ihor Hursky; Gennadiy Novikov; Petro Ostrynskyi; Yuriy Shchyholev; Olexander Yukhnenko	United States (USA): Kenneth Abode; Lloyd Bacharach; Larry Chloupek; William Demby; Steve Doudt; Jim Dugan; Jim Kessler; Paul Kramer; Tracey Lange; Paul Moran; Bryan Tabler; James Terpenning; Edward Tuthill
