= Wheelchair fencing at the 2012 Summer Paralympics – Women's foil B =

Women's foil B at the XIV Paralympic Games
- Paralympic Wheelchair fencing
- Venue: ExCeL Exhibition Centre
- Dates: 4 September
- Competitors: 11 from 8 nations

Medalists
1st place, gold medalist(s)		Yao Fang	China
2nd place, silver medalist(s)		Gyongyi Dani	Hungary
3rd place, bronze medalist(s)		Marta Makowska	Poland

The women's foil B wheelchair fencing competition at the 2012 Summer Paralympics was held on 4 September at the ExCeL Exhibition Centre.

The tournament started with a group phase round-robin followed by a knockout stage.

During a qualification round-robin, bouts lasted a maximum of three minutes, or until one athlete had scored five hits. There was then a knockout phase, in which bouts lasted a maximum of nine minutes (three periods of three minutes), or until one athlete had scored 15 hits.

The event was won by Yao Fang, representing China.

== Results ==
=== Preliminaries ===
==== Pool A ====
Rank	Competitor	MP	W	L	Points	HKG	HUN	POL	CHN	RUS
1	Chan Yui Chong (HKG)	4	4	0	20:7	x	5:1	5:1	5:3	5:2
2	Gyongyi Dani (HUN)	4	2	2	14:14	1:5	x	5:2	3:5	5:2
3	Marta Makowska (POL)	4	2	2	13:16	1:5	2:5	x	5:3	5:3
4	Yao Fang (CHN)	4	1	3	15:18	3:5	5:3	3:5	x	4:5
5	Liudmila Vasileva (RUS)	4	1	3	12:19	2:5	2:5	3:5	5:4	x

==== Pool B ====
Rank	Competitor	MP	W	L	Points	CHN	GER	RUS	HUN	GBR	UKR
1	Zhou Jingjing (CHN)	5	5	0	25:8	x	5:3	5:0	5:2	5:2	5:1
2	Simone Briese-Baetke (GER)	5	4	1	23:8	3:5	x	5:0	5:2	5:0	5:1
3	Irina Mishurova (RUS)	5	3	2	15:13	0:5	0:5	x	5:0	5:2	5:1
4	Judit Palfi (HUN)	5	1	4	13:22	2:5	2:5	0:5	x	4:5	5:2
5	Justine Moore (GBR)	5	1	4	13:24	2:5	0:5	2:5	5:4	x	4:5
6	Iryna Lukianenko (UKR)	5	1	4	10:24	1:5	1:5	1:5	2:5	5:4	x

=== Competition bracket ===
Quarter-finals
Zhou Jingjing (CHN)	15
Liudmila Vasileva (RUS)	11
Gyongyi Dani (HUN)	15
Irina Mishurova (RUS)	3
Simone Briese-Baetke (GER)	11
Marta Makowska (POL)	15
Yao Fang (CHN)	15
Chan Yui Chong (HKG)	13

Semi-finals
Zhou Jingjing (CHN)	13
Gyongyi Dani (HUN)	15
Marta Makowska (POL)	10
Yao Fang (CHN)	15

Final
Gyongyi Dani (HUN)	10
Yao Fang (CHN)	15
Third place
Zhou Jingjing (CHN)	14
Marta Makowska (POL)	15
