= Ľubomír Novosád =

Slovak Paralympic volleyball player (born 1972)

Medal record
Men's volleyball
Paralympic Games
Representing Czechoslovakia
Bronze medal – third place	1992 Barcelona	Volleyball - standing
Representing Slovakia
Silver medal – second place	1996 Atlanta	Volleyball - standing
Bronze medal – third place	2000 Sydney	Volleyball - standing

Ľubomír Novosád (born 2 March 1972) is a Slovak Paralympic volleyball player. He competed for Czechoslovakia in the men's standing volleyball event at the 1992 Summer Paralympics (bronze medal) and for Slovakia at the 1996 Summer Paralympics (silver medal) and the 2000 Summer Paralympics (bronze medal).

== See also ==
- Czechoslovakia at the 1992 Summer Paralympics
- Slovakia at the 1996 Summer Paralympics
- Slovakia at the 2000 Summer Paralympics
