= Peter Moravčík =

Czechoslovak Paralympic volleyball player (born 1961)

Personal information
- Born: 7 January 1961 (age 65)
Medal record
Men's volleyball
Paralympic Games
Representing Czechoslovakia
| Bronze medal – third place | 1992 Barcelona | Volleyball - standing |
Representing Slovakia
| Silver medal – second place | 1996 Atlanta | Volleyball - standing |
| Bronze medal – third place | 2000 Sydney | Volleyball - standing |

Peter Moravčík (born 7 January 1961) competed for Czechoslovakia in the men's standing volleyball event at the 1992 Summer Paralympics (bronze medal) and for Slovakia at the 1996 Summer Paralympics (silver medal) and the 2000 Summer Paralympics (bronze medal).

== See also ==
- Czechoslovakia at the 1992 Summer Paralympics
- Slovakia at the 1996 Summer Paralympics
- Slovakia at the 2000 Summer Paralympics
