= Frantisek Trtik =

Czechoslovak Paralympic volleyball player

František Trtik
Medal record
Men's volleyball
Representing Czechoslovakia
Paralympic Games
Bronze medal – third place	1992 Barcelona	Volleyball - standing

František Trtik (born 17 September 1950) competed for Czechoslovakia in the men's standing volleyball event at the 1992 Summer Paralympics, winning a bronze medal.

== See also ==
- Czechoslovakia at the 1992 Summer Paralympics
