= Ladislav Vytisk =

Czechoslovak Paralympic volleyball player (born 1957)

Ladislav Výtisk
Personal information
- Born: 27 September 1957 (age 68)
Medal record
Men's volleyball
Representing Czechoslovakia
Paralympic Games
Bronze medal – third place	1992 Barcelona	Volleyball - standing

Ladislav Výtisk (born 27 September 1957) competed for Czechoslovakia in the men's standing volleyball event at the 1992 Summer Paralympics (bronze medal) and for the Czech Republic at the 1996 Summer Paralympics.

== See also ==
- Czechoslovakia at the 1992 Summer Paralympics
- Czech Republic at the 1996 Summer Paralympics
