= Siegmund Soicke =

German Paralympic volleyball player

Medal record
Men's volleyball
Paralympic Games
Representing West Germany
| Gold medal – first place | 1988 Seoul | Volleyball - standing |
Representing Germany
| Bronze medal – third place | 1992 Barcelona | Volleyball - sitting |

Siegmund Soicke competed for West Germany in the men's standing volleyball event at the 1988 Summer Paralympics, where he won a gold medal.

He also competed for Germany in men's sitting volleyball events at the 1992 Summer Paralympics (winning a bronze medal), the 1996 Summer Paralympics, the 2000 Summer Paralympics, and the 2004 Summer Paralympics.

== See also ==
- West Germany at the 1988 Summer Paralympics
- Germany at the 1992 Summer Paralympics
- Germany at the 1996 Summer Paralympics
- Germany at the 2000 Summer Paralympics
- Germany at the 2004 Summer Paralympics
