= Wheelchair fencing at the 2004 Summer Paralympics – Women's épée B =

Wheelchair Fencing - Women's Epee Individual B at the XII Paralympic Games
- Paralympic Wheelchair Fencing
- Venue: Helliniko Fencing Hall
- Dates: 18 September 2004
- Competitors: 15 from 12 nations

Medalists
1st place, gold medalist(s)		Saysunee Jana	Thailand
2nd place, silver medalist(s)		Chan Yui Chong	Hong Kong
3rd place, bronze medalist(s)		Marta Wyrzykowska	Poland

The Women's Epee Individual B wheelchair fencing competition at the 2004 Summer Paralympics was held on 18 September at the Helliniko Fencing Hall.

The event was won by Saysunee Jana, representing Thailand.

== Results ==
=== Preliminaries ===
Qualified for final round

==== Pool A ====
Rank	Competitor	MP	W	L	Points	POL	ITA	UKR	ESP	ARG
1	Marta Wyrzykowska (POL)	4	4	0	20:5	x	5:3	5:0	5:1	5:1
2	Rosalba Vettraino (ITA)	4	3	1	18:8	3:5	x	5:2	5:1	5:0
3	Iryna Lykyanenko (UKR)	4	2	2	12:15	0:5	2:5	x	5:4	5:1
4	Gema Victoria Hassen Bey (ESP)	4	1	3	11:15	1:5	1:5	4:5	x	5:0
5	Susana Masciotra (ARG)	4	0	4	2:20	1:5	0:5	1:5	0:5	x

==== Pool B ====
Rank	Competitor	MP	W	L	Points	HKG	THA	HUN	USA	GER
1	Chan Yui Chong (HKG)	4	4	0	20:7	x	5:3	5:0	5:2	5:2
2	Saysunee Jana (THA)	4	3	1	18:9	3:5	x	5:1	5:1	5:2
3	Judit Palfi (HUN)	4	2	2	11:16	0:5	1:5	x	5:2	5:4
4	Carol Hickey (USA)	4	1	3	10:19	2:5	1:5	2:5	x	5:4
5	Waltraud Stollwerck (GER)	4	0	4	12:20	2:5	2:5	4:5	4:5	x

==== Pool C ====
Rank	Competitor	MP	W	L	Points	HUN	FRA	GER	HKG	BRA
1	Gyongyi Dani (HUN)	4	4	0	19:7	x	5:2	5:2	4:3	5:0
2	Sylvie Magnat (FRA)	4	3	1	17:13	2:5	x	5:2	5:2	5:4
3	Esther Weber Kranz (GER)	4	2	2	14:17	2:5	2:5	x	5:4	5:3
4	Wong Kit Mui (HKG)	4	1	3	14:15	3:4	2:5	4:5	x	5:1
5	Andrea de Mello (BRA)	4	0	4	8:20	0:5	4:5	3:5	1:5	x

=== Competition bracket ===
Round of 16
Judit Palfi (HUN)	15
Iryna Lykyanenko (UKR)	13
Saysunee Jana (THA)	15
Carol Hickey (USA)	1
Gema Victoria Hassen Bey (ESP)	15
Sylvie Magnat (FRA)	14
Esther Weber Kranz (GER)	15
Wong Kit Mui (HKG)	5

Quarterfinals
Marta Wyrzykowska (POL)	15
Judit Palfi (HUN)	2
Saysunee Jana (THA)	15
Rosalba Vettraino (ITA)	13
Gyongyi Dani (HUN)	15
Gema Victoria Hassen Bey (ESP)	8
Esther Weber Kranz (GER)	9
Chan Yui Chong (HKG)	15

Semifinals
Marta Wyrzykowska (POL)	9
Saysunee Jana (THA)	15
Gyongyi Dani (HUN)	8
Chan Yui Chong (HKG)	15

Final
Saysunee Jana (THA)	15
Chan Yui Chong (HKG)	13
Third place
Marta Wyrzykowska (POL)	15
Gyongyi Dani (HUN)	8
