= Peter Damajka =

Czechoslovak Paralympic volleyball player (born 1962)

Personal information
- Born: 30 September 1962 (age 63)
Medal record
Men's volleyball
Representing Czechoslovakia
Paralympic Games
Bronze medal – third place	1992 Barcelona	Volleyball - standing

Peter Damajka (born 30 September 1962) competed for Czechoslovakia in the men's standing volleyball event at the 1992 Summer Paralympics, winning a bronze medal.

== See also ==
- Czechoslovakia at the 1992 Summer Paralympics
