= Peter Banas =

Czechoslovak Paralympic volleyball player (born 1973)

Peter Banáš
Personal information
- Born: 4 March 1973 (age 53)
Medal record
Men's volleyball
Representing Czechoslovakia
Paralympic Games
Bronze medal – third place	1992 Barcelona	Volleyball - standing

Peter Banáš (born 4 March 1973) competed for Czechoslovakia in the men's standing volleyball event at the 1992 Summer Paralympics, winning a bronze medal.

== See also ==
- Czechoslovakia at the 1992 Summer Paralympics
