= Zdeněk Svoboda (volleyball) =

Czech Paralympic volleyball player (born 1966)

Personal information
- Born: 28 August 1966 (age 59)
Medal record
Men's volleyball
Representing Czechoslovakia
Paralympic Games
Bronze medal – third place	1992 Barcelona	Volleyball - standing

Zdeněk Svoboda (born 28 August 1966) is a Czech Paralympic volleyball player. He competed for Czechoslovakia in the men's standing volleyball event at the 1992 Summer Paralympics (bronze medal) and for the Czech Republic at the 1996 Summer Paralympics (8th place).

== See also ==
- Czechoslovakia at the 1992 Summer Paralympics
- Czech Republic at the 1996 Summer Paralympics
