= Horst Beyer =

Horst Beyer may refer to:

- Horst Beyer (Paralympian), German Paralympian
- Horst Beyer (decathlete) (1940–2017), German decathlete
