= Pinkava =

Pinkava (Czech/Slovak feminine: Pinkavová) is a surname. Notable people with the surname include:

- Donald John Pinkava (1933–2017), American botanist
- Jan Pinkava (born 1963), Czech filmmaker
- Jaromir Pinkava, Czech Paralympic volleyball player
- Václav Pinkava (1926–1995), real name of Jan Křesadlo, Czech psychologist and writer
