= Michal Csader =

Czechoslovak Paralympic volleyball player (born 1963)

Michal Csáder
Personal information
- Born: 14 May 1963 (age 63)
Medal record
Men's volleyball
Paralympic Games
Representing Czechoslovakia
Bronze medal – third place	1992 Barcelona	Volleyball - standing
Representing Slovakia
Silver medal – second place	1996 Atlanta	Volleyball - standing

Michal Csáder (born 14 May 1963) competed for Czechoslovakia in the men's standing volleyball event at the 1992 Summer Paralympics (bronze medal) and for Slovakia at the 1996 Summer Paralympics (silver medal).

== See also ==
- Czechoslovakia at the 1992 Summer Paralympics
- Slovakia at the 1996 Summer Paralympics
