= Wheelchair fencing at the 2004 Summer Paralympics – Women's foil team =

Wheelchair Fencing - Women's Foil Team at the XII Paralympic Games
- Paralympic Wheelchair Fencing
- Venue: Helliniko Fencing Hall
- Dates: 21 September 2004
- Competitors: 7

Medalists
| 1st place, gold medalist(s) | | Chan Yui Chong; Fan Pui Shan; Wong Kit Mui; Yu Chui Yee | Hong Kong |
| 2nd place, silver medalist(s) | | Judit Palfi; Zsuzsanna Krajnyak; Andrea Jurak; Gyongyi Dani | Hungary |
| 3rd place, bronze medalist(s) | | Marta Wyrzykowska; Dagmara Witos; Jadwiga Polasik; Renata Frelik | Poland |

The Women's Foil Team wheelchair fencing competition at the 2004 Summer Paralympics was held on 21 September at the Helliniko Fencing Hall.

The event was won by the team representing Hong Kong.

== Results ==
=== Competition bracket ===
Quarterfinals
Germany | 38
Poland | 45
France | 45
Italy | 41
United States | 16
Hungary | 45

Semifinals
Hong Kong | 45
Poland | 20
France | 44
Hungary | 45

Finals
Hong Kong | 45
Hungary | 22
Third place
Poland | 45
France | 44

=== Classification 5-7 ===
| Semifinal | | | Fifth place |
| | | | 1 | Germany | 43 |
| 2 | Italy | 45 | | Italy | 45 |
| 3 | United States | 19 |

== Team Lists ==
| France; Emmanuelle Assmann; Sylvie Magnat; Sylviane Meyer; Patricia Picot | Germany; Esther Weber Kranz; Waltraud Stollwerck; Daniela Rossek; Zarife Imeri | Hong Kong; Chan Yui Chong; Fan Pui Shan; Wong Kit Mui; Yu Chui Yee | Hungary; Judit Palfi; Zsuzsanna Krajnyak; Andrea Jurak; Gyongyi Dani |
| Italy; Laura Presutto; Loredana Trigilia; Rosalba Vettraino | Poland; Marta Wyrzykowska; Dagmara Witos; Jadwiga Polasik; Renata Frelik | United States; Kristine Alexander; Susan Gilmore; Carol Hickey | |
