= Francisca Bazalo Gallego =

Spanish wheelchair fencer

Francisca Bazalo
Personal information
- Full name: Francisca Bazalo Gallego
- Nationality: Spanish
- Born: 5 May 1962 (age 64) Málaga, Spain
Medal record
Women's wheelchair fencing
Representing Spain
Paralympic Games
Gold medal – first place	1992 Barcelona	Épée 3–4
Bronze medal – third place	1992 Barcelona	Épée team
Bronze medal – third place	1996 Atlanta	Épée team

Francisca Bazalo Gallego (born 5 May 1962 in Málaga) is a Spanish épée and foil wheelchair fencer.

She fenced at the 1992 Summer Paralympics and the 1996 Summer Paralympics, where she finished third in the épée team both times. She also fenced at the 2000 Summer Paralympics in Sydney, Australia, but did not finish in the top 3.
