= Volleyball at the 1992 Summer Paralympics =

1992 Paralympics volleyball

Volleyball at the IX Paralympic Games
- Paralympic standing and sitting volleyball

Medalists
1st place, gold medalist(s)		Germany (GER) (standing); Iran (IRI) (sitting)
2nd place, silver medalist(s)		Poland (POL) (standing); Netherlands (NED) (sitting)
3rd place, bronze medalist(s)		Czechoslovakia (TCH) (standing); Germany (GER) (sitting)

Paralympic symbol (1988-1994)

Volleyball at the 1992 Summer Paralympics in Barcelona consisted of standing and sitting volleyball events for men.

== Medal summary ==
Event	Gold	Silver	Bronze
Men's standing	Germany (GER) Rudolf Durrer; Josef Giebel; Pavo Grgic; Bernd Heinrich; Andreas Johann; Stefan Kaiser; Manfred Kohl; Oliver Mueller; Bernard Schmidl; Rudolf Schwietering; Elmar Sommer; Karl-Josef Weißenfels	Poland (POL) Tadeusz Bogusz; Czeslaw Humerski; Andrzej Iwaniak; Janusz Klos; Jerzy Kruszelnicki; Stanislaw Leja; Jacek Lojtek; Marian Warda; Maciej Wroblewski; Adam Zawislak	Czechoslovakia (TCH) Peter Banas; Michal Csader; Peter Damajka; Milan Kulas; Josef Mihalco; Peter Moravcik; Jaromir Mourecek; Lubomir Novosad; Jaromir Pinkava; Zdenek Svoboda; Frantisek Trtik; Ladislav Vytisk
Men's sitting	Iran (IRI) Gholam Akhavan; Parviz Firouzi; Ali Golkar; Hassan Hashemi; Ali Kashfia; Hassan Mohammadi; Hadi Rezaei; Ali Akbar Salavatian; Ahmad Shivani; Majid Soleimani; Hassan Zendehgard	Netherlands (NED) Henk Aalders; Gerard Broertjes; Hans Deelen; Christiaan Driessen; Ron Durge; Richard Gesell; Alfred Oonk; Johan Reekers; Gerard Spreeuwenberg; Pieter Top; Andre Venderbosch; Ulrich Zinngrebe	Germany (GER) Steffen Barsch; Rolf Elbrachter; Jens Faerber; Joerg Gaetje; Robert Grylak; Bert Jasper; Michael Konrad; Gunther Kruger; Siegmund Soicke; Frank Spremberg; Ferenc Stettner; Joachim Wahl

== Medal table ==
Rank	Nation	Gold	Silver	Bronze	Total
1	Germany (GER)	1	0	1	2
2	Iran (IRI)	1	0	0	1
3	Netherlands (NED)	0	1	0	1
3	Poland (POL)	0	1	0	1
5	Czechoslovakia (TCH)	0	0	1	1
Totals (5 entries)		2	2	2	6

== Men's standing volleyball team rosters ==
Source: International Paralympic Committee

Czechoslovakia (TCH): Peter Banas; Michal Csader; Peter Damajka; Milan Kulas; Josef Mihalco; Peter Moravcik; Jaromir Mourecek; Lubomir Novosad; Jaromir Pinkava; Zdenek Svoboda; Frantisek Trtik; Ladislav Vytisk	France (FRA): Olivier Allo; Gilles Bidois; Cyril Blom; Eric Brand; Jean-Marie Buart; Didier Dekeukelaire; Guy Devos; Marc Dupoyet; Thierry Martin; Eric Masse; Peter Peeters	Germany (GER): Rudolf Durrer; Josef Giebel; Pavo Grgic; Bernd Heinrich; Andreas Johann; Stefan Kaiser; Manfred Kohl; Oliver Mueller; Bernard Schmidl; Rudolf Schwietering; Elmar Sommer; Karl-Josef Weißenfels	Great Britain (GBR): Peter Barnes; Ian Bell; Frederick Church; Gerard Dillon; Ian Fergus; Kenneth Greatbatch; Steven Johnson; David McCrae; Patrick Scott; Andrew Townsend
Israel (ISR): Hanoch Budin; Ronen Avivi; Aharon Danziger; Nisim Franko; Eyal Gur; Zvi Karsh; Gad Lanzer; Miron Tzidkilov; Chen Tzur; Hagai Zamir	Poland (POL): Tadeusz Bogusz; Czeslaw Humerski; Andrzej Iwaniak; Janusz Klos; Jerzy Kruszelnicki; Stanislaw Leja; Jacek Lojtek; Marian Warda; Maciej Wroblewski; Adam Zawislak	United States (USA): Ronnie Alsup; Michael Cowley; Barry Hammer; Robert Harden; Daniel Jim; Dennis Lee; David Newkirk; Tim Ploszaj; Mick Savage; Thomas Sestanovich; Rick Turner; Michael Walters	

== Men's sitting volleyball team rosters ==
Source: International Paralympic Committee

Egypt (EGY): Sameh Abd Allah; Adel Abd Elmoaty; Yaser Abd Elwahab; Emad Abou; Ihab Ahmed; Hassan Ali; Khaled Baiomy; Mohamed Besheer; Emad Hassan; Ahmed Ibrahim; Amin Ibrahim; Emad Mahmod Ramadan	Finland (FIN): Keijo Hanninen; Harri Harinen; Mikko Kannisto; Pekka Norola; Tapani Piilola; Matti Pulli; Allan Pynnonen; Reijo Salonen; Reijo Taitonen; Sami Tervo; Veli-Matti Tuominen; Aulis Vistbacka	Germany (GER): Steffen Barsch; Rolf Elbrachter; Jens Faerber; Joerg Gaetje; Robert Grylak; Bert Jasper; Michael Konrad; Gunther Kruger; Siegmund Soicke; Frank Spremberg; Ferenc Stettner; Joachim Wahl	Hungary (HUN): Janos Becsey; Imre Balogh; Sandor Budai; Jozsef Czimmermann; Andras Domokos; Miklos Kekecs; Sandor Makarovszki; Janos Peres; Csaba Polcz; Jozsef Stirczer; Laszlo Szabo; Gyorgy Urbancsok
Iran (IRI): Gholam Akhavan Kharazian; Parviz Firouzi; Ali Golkar Azghandi; Seyed Hashemi; Ali Kashfia; Hassan Mohammadi; Hadi Rezaeikarakani; Aliakbar Salavatian; Ahmad Shivani Mahjori; Majid Soleimanikhoramdasht; Hassan Zendehkard	Iraq (IRQ): Hadi Abdul; Ahmad Ahmad; Mohamad Baker; Ali Hmoud; Salah Kadhim; Ahmed E. Khalaf; Simar Liter; Kasim Radhi; Saeed Rasoli; Nasser Saleh; Mezher Salem; Mohammed Tawfiq	Netherlands (NED): Henk Aalders; Gerard Broertjes; Hans Deelen; Christiaan Driessen; Ron Durge; Richard Gesell; Alfred Oonk; Johan Reekers; Gerard Spreeuwenberg; Pieter Top; Andre Venderbosch; Ulrich Zinngrebe	Norway (NOR): Bjarne Abrahamsen; Erik Halvorsen; Ole Hodnemyr; Lars Jensen; Geir Kjolsrud; Geir Kvarsvik; Oeivind Olsen; Gaute Rostrup; Andreas Vennesland
Spain (ESP): Antonio Contreras; Cesar Cruzado; Antonio Duran; Jaime Guarro; Jose Hernaez; Salvador Huescas; Jordi Mora; Antonio Parrilla; Jose Pascualena; Pedro Romero; Manel Seva; Lluis Turro	Sweden (SWE): Jens Kask; John Bergstrom; Sven Eryd; Stefan Jansson; Per-Ola Jonsson; Sten-Ivar Larsson; Tommy Larsson; Lars Lindeberg; Kjell Nilsson; Eddie Stefors	Unified Team (EUN): Igor Bondar; Gadji Abakarov; A. Gontcharenko; Victor Krasnov; Alexander Kukatov; Murad Makhanov; Radjab Mamaev; Vladimir Maysak; Petr Ostrinsky; Iouri Soubbota; Peter Zubov	United States (USA): Kenneth Abode; Rusty Belknap; Tom Caleca; William Demby; George McFadden; Bruce Miller; Lee Montgomery; Paul Moran; Edward Sliwinski
