= Poland at the 1996 Summer Paralympics =

- IPC code: POL
- NPC: Polish Paralympic Committee
- Website: www.paralympic.org.pl

in Atlanta
- Competitors: 61 (49 men and 12 women)
- Medals Ranked 11th: Gold 13 Silver 14 Bronze 8 Total 35

Summer Paralympics appearances (overview)
- 1972; 1976; 1980; 1984; 1988; 1992; 1996; 2000; 2004; 2008; 2012; 2016; 2020; 2024

61 athletes (49 men and 12 women) from Poland competed at the 1996 Summer Paralympics in Atlanta, United States.

== Medallists ==
Medal	Name	Sport	Event
Gold	Ryszard Olejnik	Archery	Men's individual standing
Gold	Malgorzata Olejnik	Archery	Women's individual standing
Gold	Andrzej Wrobel	Athletics	Men's 1500m T34-37
Gold	Waldemar Kikolski	Athletics	Men's marathon T11
Gold	Jerzy Dabrowski	Athletics	Men's discus F46
Gold	Miroslaw Pych	Athletics	Men's javelin F11
Gold	Jerzy Dabrowski	Athletics	Men's shot put F46
Gold	Miroslaw Pych	Athletics	Men's pentathlon P11
Gold	Ryszard Fornalczyk	Powerlifting	Men's 75 kg
Gold	Ryszard Tomaszewski	Powerlifting	Men's 90 kg
Gold	Miroslaw Piesak	Swimming	Men's 50m freestyle S2
Gold	Arkadiusz Pawlowski	Swimming	Men's 200m medley SM5
Gold	Malgorzata Okupniak	Swimming	Women's 100m breaststroke SM6
Silver	Stanislaw Jonski; Tomasz Lezanski; Ryszard Olejnik	Archery	Men's team standing
Silver	Miroslaw Pych	Athletics	Men's 100m T11
Silver	Andrzej Wrobel	Athletics	Men's 800m T34-36
Silver	Waldemar Kikolski	Athletics	Men's 10000m T11
Silver	Tomasz Chmurzynski	Athletics	Men's marathon T11
Silver	Tomasz Rebisz	Athletics	Men's discus F46
Silver	Tomasz Rebisz	Athletics	Men's shot put F46
Silver	Leszek Hallmann	Powerlifting	Men's +100 kg
Silver	Miroslaw Piesak	Swimming	Men's 50m backstroke S2
Silver	Krzysztof Ślęczka	Swimming	Men's 150m medley SM4
Silver	Katarzyna Michalczyk	Swimming	Women's 100m backstroke S9
Silver	Edyta Okoczuk	Swimming	Women's 100m breaststroke SB6
Silver	Malgorzata Okupniak	Swimming	Women's 200m medley SM7
Silver	Jadwiga Polasik	Wheelchair fencing	Women's épée individual A
Bronze	Waldemar Kikolski	Athletics	Men's 5000m T11
Bronze	Tomasz Rebisz	Athletics	Men's javelin F46
Bronze	Krzysztof Ślęczka	Swimming	Men's 50m freestyle S5
Bronze	Krzysztof Ślęczka	Swimming	Men's 100m freestyle S5
Bronze	Krzysztof Ślęczka	Swimming	Men's 200m freestyle S5
Bronze	Malgorzata Okupniak	Swimming	Women's 50m butterfly S7
Bronze	Krystyna Jagodzinska	Table tennis	Women's singles 10
Bronze	Adam Zawislak; Tomasz Wozny; K. Mozdzynski; Roman Wanecki; Jan Maliszak; Czeslaw Humerski; Marian Warda; Andrzej Iwaniak; Stanislaw Leja; Piotr Moszczynski; Tadeusz Bogusz; Jerzy Kruszelnicki	Volleyball	Men's standing volleyball team

== See also ==
- Poland at the Paralympics
- Poland at the 1996 Summer Olympics
