= Steffen Barsch =

German sitting volleyball player

Personal information
- Born: 23 June 1967 (age 59) Berlin, Germany

Sport
- Country: Germany
- Sport: Sitting volleyball
- Club: SCC Berlin
Medal record
Sitting volleyball
Representing Germany
Paralympic Games
Bronze medal – third place	1992 Barcelona	Men's sitting
World Championships
Silver medal – second place	2002 Cairo	Men's sitting
European Championships
Silver medal – second place	1999 Sarajevo	Men's sitting
Silver medal – second place	2001 Sarospatak	Men's sitting
Silver medal – second place	2003 Lappeenranta	Men's sitting
Silver medal – second place	2005 Leverkusen	Men's sitting
Bronze medal – third place	2007 Nyiregyhaza	Men's sitting
Bronze medal – third place	2011 Rotterdam	Men's sitting

Steffen (im Sitzvolleyball unter "Icke" bekannt) Barsch (born 23 June 1967) is a German retired sitting volleyball player who competed at international sitting volleyball competitions. He is a Paralympic bronze medalist, World silver medalist and six-time European medalist. He has competed at the 1992, 1996, 2000 and 2004 Summer Paralympics.
