= Piotr Moszczynski =

Polish Paralympic volleyball player

Medal record
Men's volleyball
Representing Poland
Paralympic Games
Bronze medal – third place	1996 Seoul	Volleyball - standing

Piotr Moszczynski competed for Poland in the men's standing volleyball events at the 1996 Summer Paralympics (bronze medal) and the 2000 Summer Paralympics.

== See also ==
- Poland at the 1996 Summer Paralympics
- Poland at the 2000 Summer Paralympics
