= Manfred Kohl =

German Paralympic volleyball player

Medal record
Men's volleyball
Paralympic Games
Representing West Germany
Gold medal – first place	1988 Seoul	Volleyball - standing
Representing Germany
Gold medal – first place	1992 Barcelona	Volleyball - standing
Gold medal – first place	1996 Atlanta	Volleyball - standing
Gold medal – first place	2000 Sydney	Volleyball - standing

Manfred Kohl competed for West Germany in the men's standing volleyball events at the 1988 Summer Paralympics and for Germany at the 1992 Summer Paralympics, the 1996 Summer Paralympics, and the 2000 Summer Paralympics. He won gold medals in 1988, 1992, 1996, and 2000.

== See also ==
- West Germany at the 1988 Summer Paralympics
- Germany at the 1992 Summer Paralympics
- Germany at the 1996 Summer Paralympics
- Germany at the 2000 Summer Paralympics
