= Oliver Mueller =

German Paralympic volleyball player

Medal record
Men's volleyball
Representing Germany
Paralympic Games
| Gold medal – first place | 1992 Barcelona | Volleyball - standing |
| Gold medal – first place | 1996 Atlanta | Volleyball - standing |
| Gold medal – first place | 2000 Sydney | Volleyball - standing |

Oliver Mueller competed for Germany in the men's standing volleyball events at the 1992 Summer Paralympics, the 1996 Summer Paralympics, and the 2000 Summer Paralympics. He won gold medals in 1992, 1996, and 2000.

== See also ==
- Germany at the 1992 Summer Paralympics
- Germany at the 1996 Summer Paralympics
- Germany at the 2000 Summer Paralympics
