= Pavol Betin =

Slovak Paralympic volleyball player

Medal record
Men's volleyball
Representing Slovakia
Paralympic Games
Silver medal – second place	1996 Atlanta	Volleyball - standing

Pavol Betin competed for Slovakia in the men's standing volleyball event at the 1996 Summer Paralympics, winning a silver medal.

== See also ==
- Slovakia at the 1996 Summer Paralympics
