= Hadi Rezaei =

Iranian sitting volleyball coach

Personal information
- Nationality: Iranian
- Born: 10 December 1960 (age 65); Mashhad, Iran
Honours
Representing Iran
Paralympic Games
Gold medal – first place	1988 Seoul	Team
Gold medal – first place	1992 Barcelona	Team
Gold medal – first place	1996 Atlanta	Team
World Championships
Gold medal – first place	1985 Kristiasand	Team
Gold medal – first place	1986 Pecs	Team
Gold medal – first place	1990 Assen	Team
Gold medal – first place	1994 Bottrop	Team

Hadi Rezaeigarkani (born December 10, 1960) is an Iranian sitting volleyball coach, and former player with world and Paralympic medals, the most proud sitting volleyball coach in the world, currently as the head coach of Iran's men's sitting volleyball team.

== Coaching career ==
=== Paralympics ===
- (gold) 2000 Sydney
- (silver) 2004 Athens
- (gold) 2008 Beijing
- (silver) 2012 London
- (gold) 2016 Rio de Janeiro
- (gold) 2020 Tokyo

=== World Championships ===
- (gold) 1998 Tehran
- (bronze) 2002 Cairo
- (silver) 2006 Roermond
- (gold) 2010 Edmond
- (bronze) 2014 Elblag
- (gold) 2018 Arnhem
- (gold) 2022 Sarajevo

=== Asian Para Games ===
- (gold) 2010 Guangzhou
- (gold) 2014 Incheon
- (gold) 2018 Jakarta
- (gold) 2022 Hangzhou

=== World Clubs Championship ===
- Egypt 2023 - Gold Medal (Mes Sharebabak Iran)
- Egypt 2012 - Gold Medal (Zobahan Isfahan- Iran)
- Egypt 2011 - Gold Medal (Zobahan Isfahan- Iran)
- Egypt 2009 - Gold Medal (Zobahan Isfahan- Iran)
- Egypt 2007 - Gold Medal (Zobahan Isfahan- Iran)
- Germany 2003 - Gold Medal (Pegah- Iran)

=== Asian Clubs Championship ===
- China 2013 - Gold Medal (samen alhojaj- Iran)
- China 2011 - Gold Medal (Zobahan Isfahan- Iran)
- China 2009 - Gold Medal (Asia Gostaresh Foolad Gostar- Iran)

== Playing career ==
=== Paralympics ===
- (gold) 1988 Seoul
- (gold) 1992 Barcelona 1992
- (gold) 1996 Atlanta

=== World Championships ===
- (gold) 1985 Kristiansand
- (gold) 1986 Pecs
- (gold) 1990 Assen
- (gold) 1994 Bottrop

== Other roles ==
=== Administrator ===
- AOPV Secratory General 2014–2018
- IRISFD Members at Large 2014–2018
- IRINPC Honorary Board member 2014
- IRISFD Technical Deputy 2012–2014
- World Para Volley Executive Member 2010–2012
- AOCVD Para Volleyball Vice President 2008–2014
- Khorasan Sports Board for the Athletes with Disabilities President 2004–2019
- Khorasan Sports Board for the Athletes with Disabilities Vice President 1996–2004

== Education ==
- Educator in sitting volleyball 2008
- Olympics solidarity 2006
- International coaching sitting volleyball 2003

== See also ==
- Iran at the Paralympics
- Iran at the 1988 Summer Paralympics
- Iran at the 1992 Summer Paralympics
- Iran at the 1996 Summer Paralympics
- Iran at the 2004 Summer Paralympics
- Iran at the 2008 Summer Paralympics
- Sitting volleyball at the 2008 Summer Paralympics
