= Milan Kulas =

Czechoslovak Paralympic volleyball player (born 1953)

Milan Kulaš
Personal information
- Born: 9 October 1953 (age 72)
Medal record
Men's volleyball
Representing Czechoslovakia
Paralympic Games
| Bronze medal – third place | 1992 Barcelona | Volleyball - standing |

Milan Kulaš (born 9 October 1953) competed for Czechoslovakia in the men's standing volleyball event at the 1992 Summer Paralympics, winning a bronze medal.

== See also ==
- Czechoslovakia at the 1992 Summer Paralympics
