= Tadeusz Bogusz =

Polish Paralympic volleyball player

Medal record
Men's volleyball
Representing Poland
Paralympic Games
Silver medal – second place	1992 Barcelona	Volleyball - standing
Bronze medal – third place	1996 Seoul	Volleyball - standing

Tadeusz Bogusz competed for Poland in the men's standing volleyball events at the 1992 Summer Paralympics (silver medal) and the 1996 Summer Paralympics (bronze medal).

== See also ==
- Poland at the 1992 Summer Paralympics
- Poland at the 1996 Summer Paralympics
