= Jaromir Pinkava =

Czechoslovak Paralympic volleyball player

Jaromír Pinkava
Medal record
Men's volleyball
Representing Czechoslovakia
Paralympic Games
Bronze medal – third place	1992 Barcelona	Volleyball - standing

Jaromír Pinkava (born 24 September 1949) competed for Czechoslovakia in the men's standing volleyball event at the 1992 Summer Paralympics (bronze medal) and for the Czech Republic at the 1996 Summer Paralympics.

== See also ==
- Czechoslovakia at the 1992 Summer Paralympics
- Czech Republic at the 1996 Summer Paralympics
