= Roman Wanecki =

Polish Paralympic volleyball player

Medal record
Men's volleyball
Representing Poland
Paralympic Games
| Bronze medal – third place | 1996 Seoul | Volleyball - standing |

Roman Wanecki competed for Poland in the men's standing volleyball events at the 1996 Summer Paralympics (bronze medal) and the 2000 Summer Paralympics.

== See also ==
- Poland at the 1996 Summer Paralympics
- Poland at the 2000 Summer Paralympics
