= Stanislaw Leja =

Polish Paralympic volleyball player

Medal record
Men's volleyball
Representing Poland
Paralympic Games
Bronze medal – third place	1988 Seoul	Volleyball - standing
Silver medal – second place	1992 Barcelona	Volleyball - standing
Bronze medal – third place	1996 Seoul	Volleyball - standing

Stanislaw Leja competed for Poland in the men's standing volleyball events at the 1988 Summer Paralympics (bronze medal), the 1992 Summer Paralympics (silver medal), the 1996 Summer Paralympics (bronze medal), and the 2000 Summer Paralympics.

== See also ==
- Poland at the 1988 Summer Paralympics
- Poland at the 1992 Summer Paralympics
- Poland at the 1996 Summer Paralympics
- Poland at the 2000 Summer Paralympics
