= Wheelchair fencing at the 1996 Summer Paralympics =

Wheelchair fencing at the X Paralympic Games
- Paralympic Wheelchair fencing
- Competitors: 70 from 13 nations

Paralympic symbol (1994-2004)

Wheelchair fencing at the 1996 Summer Paralympics consisted of 15 events, 9 for men and 6 for women.

== Medal table ==
Rank	Nation	Gold	Silver	Bronze	Total
1	France (FRA)	7	3	5	15
2	Hong Kong (HKG)	4	1	2	7
3	Hungary (HUN)	2	1	0	3
4	Italy (ITA)	1	7	1	9
5	Germany (GER)	1	2	5	8
6	Poland (POL)	0	1	0	1
7	South Korea (KOR)	0	0	1	1
7	Spain (ESP)	0	0	1	1
Totals (8 entries)		15	15	15	45

=== Participating nations ===
- Argentina (1)
- Brazil (1)
- France (13)
- Germany (10)
- Great Britain (6)
- Hong Kong (7)
- Hungary (2)
- Italy (11)
- Kuwait (3)
- Poland (2)
- South Korea (2)
- Spain (4)
- United States (8)

== Medal summary ==
=== Men's events ===
Event	Gold	Silver	Bronze
Épée individual A	Wai Leung Cheung; Hong Kong	Alberto Pellegrini; Italy	Wilfried Lipinski; Germany
Épée individual B	Jean Rosier; France	Soriano Ceccanti; Italy	Tae Hoon Park; South Korea
Épée team	Hong Kong (HKG); Wai Leung Cheung; Wai Ip Kwong; Yan Yun Tai; Man Fai Chui	Italy (ITA); Gerardo Mari; Soriano Ceccanti; Alberto Pellegrini; Ernesto Lerre	France (FRA); Arthur Bellance; Robert Citerne; Christian Lachaud; Jean Rosier
Foil individual A	Wai Leung Cheung; Hong Kong	Alberto Pellegrini; Italy	Kam Loi Chan; Hong Kong
Foil individual B	Pál Szekeres; Hungary	Jean Rosier; France	Pascal Durand; France
Foil team	Hong Kong (HKG); Kam Loi Chan; Wai Leung Cheung; Wai Ip Kwong; Sze Kit Chan	France (FRA); Jean Rosier; Pascal Durand; Yvon Pacault; Robert Citerne	Italy (ITA); Alberto Pellegrini; Alberto Serafini; Giuseppe Alfieri; Soriano Ceccanti
Sabre individual A	Yvon Pacault; France	Wilfried Lipinski; Germany	Yan Yun Tai; Hong Kong
Sabre individual B	Pál Szekeres; Hungary	Gerardo Mari; Italy	Pascal Durand; France
Sabre team	France (FRA); Christian Lachaud; Cyril More; Yvon Pacault; Pascal Durand	Hong Kong (HKG); Man Fai Chan; Sze Kit Chan; Yan Yun Tai; Kam Loi Chan	Germany (GER); Maximilian Miller; Uwe Bartmann; Wilfried Lipinski; Wolfgang Kempf

=== Women's events ===
Event	Gold	Silver	Bronze
Épée individual A	Silke Schwarz; Germany	Jadwiga Polasik; Poland	Sophie Belgodere-Paralitici; France
Épée individual B	Mariella Bertini; Italy	Rosalba Vettraino; Italy	Esther Weber-Kranz; Germany
Épée team	France (FRA); Josette Bourgain; Sophie Belgodere-Paralitici; Patricia Picot; Murielle van de Cappelle	Germany (GER); Esther Weber-Kranz; Jutta Jacob; Silke Schwarz; Monika Hertrich	Spain (ESP); Francisca Bazalo; Cristina Perez; Gema Victoria Hassen Bey
Foil individual A	Josette Bourgain; France	Sophie Belgodere-Paralitici; France	Patricia Picot; France
Foil individual B	Murielle van de Cappelle; France	Judit Palfi; Hungary	Esther Weber-Kranz; Germany
Foil team	France (FRA); Josette Bourgain; Sophie Belgodere-Paralitici; Patricia Picot; Murielle van de Cappelle	Italy (ITA); Laura Presutto; Mariella Bertini; Rosalba Vettraino	Germany (GER); Esther Weber-Kranz; Jutta Jacob; Silke Schwarz; Monika Hertrich

== See also ==
- Fencing at the 1996 Summer Olympics
