= Karl-Josef Weißenfels =

German Paralympic volleyball player (1952–2024)

Personal information
- Born: 28 March 1952
- Died: 30 October 2024 (aged 72)
Medal record
Men's volleyball
Paralympic Games
Representing West Germany
Gold medal – first place	1988 Seoul	Volleyball - standing
Representing Germany
Gold medal – first place	1992 Barcelona	Volleyball - standing
Gold medal – first place	1996 Atlanta	Volleyball - standing

Karl-Josef Weißenfels (or Weissenfels German pronunciation: [ˈkaʁl ˈjoːzɛf ˈvaɪsn̩fɛls]; 28 March 1952 – 30 October 2024) was a German volleyball player. He competed for West Germany in the men's standing volleyball events at the 1988 Summer Paralympics and for Germany at the 1992 Summer Paralympics, and the 1996 Summer Paralympics. He won gold medals in 1988, 1992, and 1996.

Weißenfels died on 30 October 2024, at the age of 72.

== See also ==
- West Germany at the 1988 Summer Paralympics
- Germany at the 1992 Summer Paralympics
- Germany at the 1996 Summer Paralympics
