= K. Mozdzynski =

Polish Paralympic volleyball player

Medal record
Men's volleyball
Representing Poland
Paralympic Games
Bronze medal – third place	1996 Seoul	Volleyball - standing

K. Mozdzynski competed for Poland in the men's standing volleyball event at the 1996 Summer Paralympics, winning a bronze medal.

== See also ==
- Poland at the 1996 Summer Paralympics
