= Robert Citerne =

French wheelchair fencer

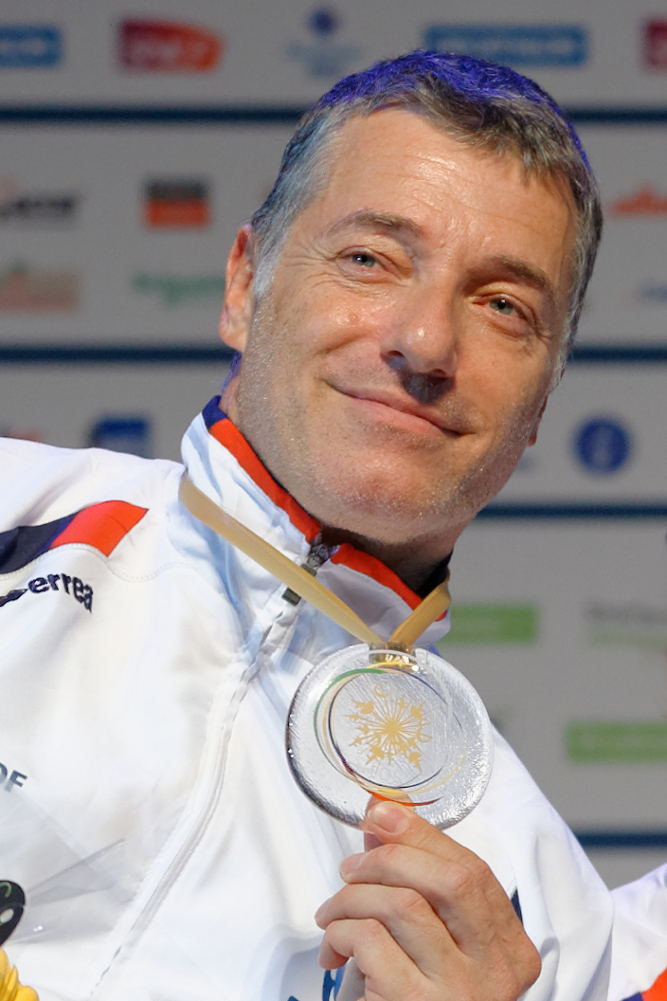
- Citerne at the 2014 IWAS European Championships

Personal information
- Nickname: Bob le Ouf (litt. “Crazy Bob”)
- Born: 10 February 1961 (age 65) Paris
- Home town: La Garenne-Colombes
- Height: 1.81 m (5 ft 11 in)
- Weight: 77 kg (170 lb)

Fencing career
- Sport: Fencing
- Weapon: Foil A / Épée A / Sabre A
- Hand: left-handed
- Club: Levallois Sporting Club
- Head coach: Jérôme Westholm, Maxime Faget
Medal record
Men's wheelchair fencing
Representing France
Paralympic Games
Gold medal – first place	1988 Seoul	Épée A
Gold medal – first place	1992 Barcelona	Team Épée
Gold medal – first place	2000 Sydney	Team Épée
Gold medal – first place	2004 Athens	Team Épée
Silver medal – second place	1988 Seoul	Team Épée
Silver medal – second place	1996 Atlanta	Team Épée
Bronze medal – third place	1992 Barcelona	Foil A
Bronze medal – third place	1996 Atlanta	Team Foil
Bronze medal – third place	2000 Sydney	Foil A
IWAS World Championships
Gold medal – first place	2006 Turino	Épée A
Gold medal – first place	2006 Turino	Team Sabre
Gold medal – first place	2010 Paris	Team Épée
Silver medal – second place	1998 La Chaux	Team Épée
Silver medal – second place	2011 Catania	Team Épée
Bronze medal – third place	1998 La Chaux	Épée A
IWAS European Championships
Gold medal – first place	1997 Gdansk	Team Épée
Gold medal – first place	2005 Zalaegerszeg	Épée A
Gold medal – first place	2005 Zalaegerszeg	Team Épée
Gold medal – first place	2007 Ghent	Team Épée
Gold medal – first place	2009 Plovdiv	Team Épée
Gold medal – first place	2009 Plovdiv	Team Sabre
Gold medal – first place	2011 Sheffield	Team Épée
Gold medal – first place	2014 Strasburg	Team Épée
Silver medal – second place	2005 Zalaegerszeg	Sabre A
Silver medal – second place	2007 Ghent	Épée A
Silver medal – second place	2007 Ghent	Sabre A

Robert Citerne (born 10 February 1961 in Paris) is a French wheelchair fencer, who earned four gold medals out of seven Paralympic participations. He is also three-time World champion and eight-time European champion in individual and team events.

Citerne has right hemiplegia since he was six months old. He took up fencing at the age of 19 after his physical therapist suggested it to him. He joined in 1987 the France national team, of which he is still a member. He is known in the fencing community as “Bob le Ouf”, literally “Crazy Bob” because of his exuberant personality.

Citerne is IT manager at the Levallois Sporting Club, of which he is a member as an athlete. He is also city councillor of La Garenne-Colombes in charge of disability-related issues.
