= Andrzej Iwaniak =

Polish Paralympic volleyball player

Medal record
Men's volleyball
Representing Poland
Paralympic Games
| Bronze medal – third place | 1988 Seoul | Volleyball - standing |
| Silver medal – second place | 1992 Barcelona | Volleyball - standing |
| Bronze medal – third place | 1996 Seoul | Volleyball - standing |

Andrzej Iwaniak competed for Poland in the men's standing volleyball events at the 1988 Summer Paralympics (bronze medal), the 1992 Summer Paralympics (silver medal), the 1996 Summer Paralympics (bronze medal), and the 2000 Summer Paralympics.

== See also ==
- Poland at the 1988 Summer Paralympics
- Poland at the 1992 Summer Paralympics
- Poland at the 1996 Summer Paralympics
- Poland at the 2000 Summer Paralympics
