= Wheelchair fencing at the 1992 Summer Paralympics =

Paralympic fencing tournament

Wheelchair fencing at the IX Paralympic Games
- Paralympic Wheelchair fencing

Paralympic symbol (1988-1994)

Wheelchair fencing at the 1992 Summer Paralympics consisted of fourteen events, nine for men and five for women.

== Medal summary ==
=== Men's events ===
Event	Gold	Silver	Bronze
Épée 2	Jean Rosier; France	Soriano Ceccanti; Italy	Uwe Bartmann; Germany
Épée 3–4	Arthur Bellance; France	Wilfried Lipinski; Germany	Christian Lachaud; France
Team épée	France (FRA); Arthur Bellance; Robert Citerne; Christian Lachaud; Jean Rosier	Germany (GER); Uwe Bartmann; Dieter Leicht; Wilfried Lipinski; Udo Schwarz	Italy (ITA); Soriano Ceccanti; Ernesto Lerre; Carlo Loa
Foil 2	Pál Szekeres; Hungary	Sze Kit Chan; Hong Kong	Andre Hennaert; France
Foil 3–4	Arthur Bellance; France	Yvon Pacault; France	Robert Citerne; France
Team foil	France (FRA); Arthur Bellance; Pascal Durand; Andre Hennaert; Yvon Pacault	Hong Kong (HKG); Kam Loi Chan; Sze Kit Chan; Wai Ip Kwong; Sik Lau	Germany (GER); Wolfgang Kempf; Dieter Leicht; Maximilian Miller; Guenter Spiess
Sabre 2	Pascal Durand; France	Sze Kit Chan; Hong Kong	Andre Hennaert; France
Sabre 3–4	Wolfgang Kempf; Germany	Christian Lachaud; France	Wilfried Lipinski; Germany
Team sabre	France (FRA); Pascal Durand; Andre Hennaert; Christian Lachaud; Yvon Pacault	Germany (GER); Uwe Bartmann; Wolfgang Kempf; Wilfried Lipinski; Guenter Spiess	Great Britain (GBR); Jack Bradley; Kevin Davies; Brian Dickinson; David Heaton

=== Women's events ===
Event	Gold	Silver	Bronze
Épée 2	Esther Weber; Germany	Mariella Bertini; Italy	Gema Victoria Hassen Bey; Spain
Épée 3–4	Francisca Bazalo; Spain	Josette Bourgain; France	Laura Presutto; Italy
Team épée	Italy (ITA); Mariella Bertini; Rossana Giarrizzo; Laura Presutto; Deborah Taffoni	France (FRA); Josette Bourgain; Patricia Picot; Veronique Soetemondt	Spain (ESP); Francisca Bazalo; Gema Victoria Hassen Bey; Cristina Perez
Foil 2	Mariella Bertini; Italy	Veronique Soetemondt; France	Esther Weber; Germany
Foil 3–4	Patricia Picot; France	Josette Bourgain; France	Laura Presutto; Italy

== Medal table ==
Rank	Nation	Gold	Silver	Bronze	Total
1	France (FRA)	8	6	4	18
2	Germany (GER)	2	3	4	9
3	Italy (ITA)	2	2	3	7
4	Spain (ESP)	1	0	2	3
5	Hungary (HUN)	1	0	0	1
6	Hong Kong (HKG)	0	3	0	3
7	Great Britain (GBR)	0	0	1	1
Totals (7 entries)		14	14	14	42
