= Pavo Grgic =

German Paralympic volleyball player

Medal record
Men's volleyball
Representing Germany
Paralympic Games
Gold medal – first place	1992 Barcelona	Volleyball - standing
Gold medal – first place	1996 Atlanta	Volleyball - standing
Gold medal – first place	2000 Sydney	Volleyball - standing

Pavo Grgic competed for Germany in the men's standing volleyball events at the 1992 Summer Paralympics, the 1996 Summer Paralympics, and the 2000 Summer Paralympics. He won gold medals in 1992, 1996, and 2000.

== See also ==
- Germany at the 1992 Summer Paralympics
- Germany at the 1996 Summer Paralympics
- Germany at the 2000 Summer Paralympics
