= Carmen Hillinger =

German Paralympic wheelchair fencer

Personal information
- Nationality: German

Sport
- Country: Germany
- Sport: Wheelchair fencing
Medal record
Paralympic Games
Silver medal – second place	2000 Sydney	Épée team
Bronze medal – third place	2000 Sydney	Foil team

Carmen Hillinger is a German wheelchair fencer.

Hillinger competed at the 2000 Paralympic Games where she won a silver medal in the épée team event and a bronze medal in the foil team event.
