= Josef Giebel =

German Paralympic volleyball player

Medal record
Men's volleyball
Paralympic Games
Representing West Germany
Gold medal – first place	1988 Seoul	Volleyball - standing
Representing Germany
Gold medal – first place	1992 Barcelona	Volleyball - standing
Gold medal – first place	1996 Atlanta	Volleyball - standing

Josef Giebel competed for West Germany in the men's standing volleyball events at the 1988 Summer Paralympics and for Germany at the 1992 Summer Paralympics and the 1996 Summer Paralympics. He won gold medals in 1988, 1992, and 1996.

== See also ==
- West Germany at the 1988 Summer Paralympics
- Germany at the 1992 Summer Paralympics
- Germany at the 1996 Summer Paralympics
