= Jacek Lojtek =

Polish Paralympic volleyball player

Medal record
Men's volleyball
Representing Poland
Paralympic Games
Silver medal – second place	1992 Barcelona	Volleyball - standing

Jacek Lojtek competed for Poland in the men's standing volleyball events at the 1992 Summer Paralympics, where the Polish tean won a silver medal).

== See also ==
- Poland at the 1992 Summer Paralympics
