= Rudolf Schwietering =

German Paralympic volleyball player

Medal record
Men's volleyball
Representing Germany
Paralympic Games
Gold medal – first place	1988 Seoul	Volleyball - standing
Gold medal – first place	1992 Barcelona	Volleyball - standing
Gold medal – first place	1996 Atlanta	Volleyball - standing

Rudolf Schwietering is a German volleyball player, who competed for Germany in the men's standing volleyball events at the 1992 Summer Paralympics and the 1996 Summer Paralympics. He won gold medals in 1988, 1992 and 1996.

== See also ==
- Germany at the 1992 Summer Paralympics
- Germany at the 1996 Summer Paralympics
