= Andreas Johann =

German Paralympic volleyball player

Medal record
Men's volleyball
Representing Germany
Paralympic Games
| Gold medal – first place | 1992 Barcelona | Volleyball - standing |
| Gold medal – first place | 1996 Atlanta | Volleyball - standing |

Andreas Johann is a German volleyball player.

== Career ==
Andreas Johann competed for Germany in the men's standing volleyball events at the 1992 Summer Paralympics and the 1996 Summer Paralympics. He won gold medals in 1992 and 1996.

== See also ==
- Germany at the 1992 Summer Paralympics
- Germany at the 1996 Summer Paralympics
