= Michal Nestorik =

Slovak Paralympic volleyball player

Personal information
- Born: 1966 or 1967 (age 59–60)
Medal record
Men's volleyball
Representing Slovakia
Paralympic Games
Silver medal – second place	1996 Atlanta	Volleyball - standing

Michal Nestorik (born 1966 or 1967) competed for Slovakia in the men's standing volleyball event at the 1996 Summer Paralympics, winning a silver medal.

== See also ==
- Slovakia at the 1996 Summer Paralympics
