= Marta Makowska =

Polish wheelchair fencer

Personal information
- Born: Marta Wyrzykowska; July 13, 1977 (age 48) Warsaw, Poland
- Spouse: Adam Makowski

Sport
- Sport: Wheelchair fencing
Medal record
Women's wheelchair fencing
Representing Poland
Paralympic Games
Gold medal – first place	2000 Sydney	Épée team
Gold medal – first place	2000 Sydney	Épée B
Gold medal – first place	2000 Sydney	Foil team
Gold medal – first place	2000 Sydney	Foil B
Bronze medal – third place	2004 Athens	Épée B
Bronze medal – third place	2004 Athens	Foil team
Bronze medal – third place	2012 London	Foil B

Marta Makowska is a Polish wheelchair fencer who has won multiple medals for her country at the Paralympic Games, including four at the 2000 Games in Sydney, Australia.

== Career ==
Marta Makowska (née Wyrzykowska) was born in Warsaw, Poland, on 13 July 1977. She attended Cardinal Stefan Wyszynski University in Warsaw where she studied life science. Outside of wheelchair fencing, which she took up as a teenager, Makowska works is a government employee at the District Family Assistance Centre in Wolomin.

At her first Paralympic Games in 2000 in Sydney, Australia, Makowska won four gold medals in the wheelchair fencing. This included a 15–4 defeat of Hungary's Judit Palfi in the Women's épée individual B, as well as the individual foil and both team events. She won a further two bronze medals at the 2004 Paralympic Games in Athens, Greece, and another bronze at the 2012 Games in London, England.

Makowska was awarded the Order of Merit of the Republic of Poland in 2013 by Bronislaw Komorowski, President of Poland.

== Personal life ==
Marta is married to Adam Makowski. Shortly before attending the 2008 Paralympic Games, Makowska discovered that she was pregnant, later giving birth to a girl.
