= Jens Altmann =

German Paralympic volleyball player (born 1968)

Medal record
Men's volleyball
Representing Germany
Paralympic Games
Gold medal – first place	1996 Atlanta	Volleyball - standing
Gold medal – first place	2000 Sydney	Volleyball - standing

Jens Altmann competed for Germany in the men's standing volleyball events at the 1996 Summer Paralympics and the 2000 Summer Paralympics. He won gold medals in 1996 and 2000.

== See also ==
- Germany at the 1996 Summer Paralympics
- Germany at the 2000 Summer Paralympics
