= Wheelchair fencing at the 2000 Summer Paralympics =

Wheelchair fencing at the XI Paralympic Games
- Paralympic Wheelchair fencing
- Venue: The Dome and Exhibition Complex
- Competitors: 84 from 18 nations

Paralympic symbol (1994–2004)

Wheelchair fencing at the 2000 Summer Paralympics consisted of épée, foil, and sabre events.

== Medal table ==
Rank	Nation	Gold	Silver	Bronze	Total
1	Poland (POL)	7	4	0	11
2	France (FRA)	4	2	4	10
3	Hong Kong (HKG)	4	2	2	8
4	Germany (GER)	0	5	3	8
5	Italy (ITA)	0	1	3	4
6	Hungary (HUN)	0	1	2	3
7	Spain (ESP)	0	0	1	1
Totals (7 entries)		15	15	15	45

=== Participating nations ===
- Argentina (1)
- Australia (2)
- Brazil (1)
- Canada (2)
- France (10)
- Germany (9)
- Great Britain (5)
- Hong Kong (6)
- Hungary (8)
- Israel (1)
- Italy (9)
- Japan (1)
- Kuwait (5)
- Poland (9)
- South Korea (1)
- Spain (4)
- Ukraine (1)
- United States (9)

== Medallists ==
Event	Gold	Silver	Bronze
Men's épée individual A	Dariusz Pender; Poland	Udo Schwarz; Germany	Alberto Pellegrini; Italy
Men's épée individual B	Jean Rosier; France	Ting Ching Chung; Hong Kong	Daniel Lamata; Spain
Men's épée team	France (FRA); Cyril Moré; Jean Rosier; Christian Lachaud; Robert Citerne	Germany (GER); Wilfried Lipinski; Udo Schwarz; Juergen Mayer; Uwe Bartmann	Hong Kong (HKG); Wai Ip Kwong; Yan Yun Tai; Ting Ching Chung
Men's foil individual A	Ying Ki Fung; Hong Kong	Alberto Pellegrini; Italy	Robert Citerne; France
Men's foil individual B	Charn Hung Hui; Hong Kong	Ting Ching Chung; Hong Kong	Pál Szekeres; Hungary
Men's foil team	Hong Kong (HKG); Kam Loi Chan; Ying Ki Fung; Charn Hung Hui; Wai Ip Kwong	Poland (POL); Dariusz Pender; Tomasz Walisiewicz; Radoslaw Stanczuk; Piotr Czop	Italy (ITA); Alberto Pellegrini; Gerardo Mari; Alberto Serafini; Soriano Ceccanti
Men's sabre individual A	Ying Ki Fung; Hong Kong	Cyril Moré; France	Wolfgang Kempf; Germany
Men's sabre individual B	Robert Wysmierski; Poland	Piotr Czop; Poland	Pascal Durand; France
Men's sabre team	France (FRA); Serge Besseiche; Pascal Durand; Yvon Pacault; Cyril Moré	Poland (POL); Robert Wysmierski; Tomasz Walisiewicz; Piotr Czop; Arkadiusz Jablonski	Hong Kong (HKG); Kam Loi Chan; Charn Hung Hui; Yan Yun Tai; Ying Ki Fung
Women's épée individual A	Jadwiga Polasik; Poland	Silke Schwarz; Germany	Zsuzsanna Krajnyak; Hungary
Women's épée individual B	Marta Wyrzykowska; Poland	Judit Pálfi; Hungary	Esther Weber-Kranz; Germany
Women's épée team	Poland (POL); Jadwiga Polasik; Agnieszka Rozkres; Marta Wyrzykowska	Germany (GER); Silke Schwarz; Waltraud Stollwerck; Esther Weber-Kranz; Carmen Hillinger	France (FRA); Sophie Belgodère; Patricia Picot; Murielle van de Cappelle
Women's foil individual A	Patricia Picot; France	Agnieszka Rozkres; Poland	Zsuzsanna Krajnyak; Hungary
Women's foil individual B	Marta Wyrzykowska; Poland	Esther Weber-Kranz; Germany	Murielle van de Cappelle; France
Women's foil team	Poland (POL); Marta Wyrzykowska; Agnieszka Rozkres; Jadwiga Polasik	France (FRA); Sophie Belgodère; Patricia Picot; Murielle van de Cappelle	Germany (GER); Silke Schwarz; Waltraud Stollwerck; Esther Weber-Kranz; Carmen Hillinger
