= Janusz Kulas =

- Born: 6 December 1936; Poznań, Poland
- Died: 8 December 1972 (aged 36); Poznań, Poland
- Other names: Eddie Polo, Italian Bandit
- Occupation: participant of the Poznań June
- Children: Wioletta, Piotr, Janusz

Janusz Kulas (aliases: "Eddie Polo"; "Włoski bandyta (Italian Bandit)") (6 December 1936, Poznań – 8 December 1972, Poznań) was a manual worker, participant of the Poznań June, steadfast participant of the "Trial of Ten", victim of persecution in Polish People's Republic.

== Biography ==
Janusz Kulas was born in 1936 in Poznań. He finished the first year of the Technikum Budowy Taboru Kolejowego (Train Building Technical School). Before the Poznań June he worked as a diver for the Przedsiębiorstwo Transportowego Budownictwa Miejskiego and was a ticket tout.

On 28 June 1956 he convinced the company's employees to join the ongoing peaceful demonstration in Poznań. He himself stood in the vanguard, carrying a banner with the sentence "Żądamy chleba" ("We demand the bread"). After the demonstration escalated into a riot he took part in the acquisition of arms from the Military Study of the Wyższa Szkoła Rolnicza (Agricultural Academy), disarming of the VII MO Commissariat at Grunwaldzka 34 and in the fights on Dąbrowskiego Street. During these fights Janusz Kulas contributed to the procurement of a tank and made an unsuccessful attempt to bring it online. After the community riots were suppressed, he was arrested on 30 June 1956. During the investigation he was tortured into incriminating other participants of the demonstration and riot.

The "Trial of Ten" began on 5 October 1956 in the Sąd Wojewódzki (Voivodeship Court) in Poznań, led by judge Dionizy Piotrowski. Prosecutor Czesław Borkowski, together with two other prosecutors from outside Poznań, accused Janusz Kulas and the remaining nine defendants of, among many accusations, robbing a Milicja Obywatelska outpost and classified it as covered by Article 1 of Mały kodeks karny (Small penal code) and thus punishable by sentences from 10 years to life in prison or by death. Władysław Banaczyk was Kulas's attorney. During the trial Janusz Kulas behaved with dignity and steadfastly defended his position. It is also noteworthy that he exhibited sense of humour. After eleven days the trial ended and 22 October 1956 was designated as the day when the sentence would be declared. Due to the beginning Thaw, signalled by Władysław Gomułka's speech, the judge initially resumed the trial, but quickly re-suspended it, to never resume it.

During the trial's suspension one of the prison guards entered Janusz Kulas's cell and stabbed him in the stomach, wounding him severely. At the end of October 1956, Kulas was released. After the release, having been forced to leave Poznań, he worked as a driver for Polskie Przedsiębiorstwo Fotogrametrii (Polish Photogrammetry Company). In 1957 he was conscripted into the military, however due to repressions he declined to serve and was sentenced to either prison or service in a penal division in Szczecin, which he left on 28 October 1957. Since then, until his death in 1972, he worked as a driver, while constantly being invigilated and repressed by Służba Bezpieczeństwa (SB) (Security Service). This forced him to change his job several times. He died in unclear circumstances on 8 December 1972.

== Private life ==
Son of Józef Kulas, participant of 1939 defensive war, and Aniela Just. Married (1958) with Eugenia Maria Zajdel (born 1937). Father of three children: one daughter, Wioletta, and two sons, Piotr and Janusz.

== Commemoration ==
- A street in Poznań, situated between Solna and Stanisława Hejnowskiego, is named after him (2016)
- A memorial slab with his biography located at the intersection of Janusza Kulasa nad Stanisława Hejnowskiego (2018)
- A post stamp and a block by Poczta Polska (Polish Post) depicting a photo of workers marching down the Armii Czerwonej (Red Army) Street (currently Święty Marcin – Saint Martin), with banner-bearing Janusz Kulas among them, made using steel engraving and rotogravure
