= Juan Lebrero =

Spanish Paralympic athlete

Medal record

Paralympic athletics

Representing Spain

Paralympic Games
Bronze medal – third place	1996 Atlanta	Shot Put - F41

Juan Lebrero is a paralympic athlete from Spain competing mainly in category F41 throwing events.

Juan competed in both the 1992 and 1996 Summer Paralympics as part of the Spanish Paralympic athletics team. In both years he competed in all three throws, in 1992 he failed to get a valid throw in the discus, finished fourteenth in the javelin and ninth in the shot put. In 1996 he finished fifth in the discus, ninth in the javelin and won a bronze medal in the shot put.
