= Patricia Picot =

French wheelchair fencer

Personal information
- Born: 20 May 1969 (age 57) Vannes, France

Sport
- Country: France
- Sport: Wheelchair fencing
- Retired: 2008
Medal record
Wheelchair fencing
Representing France
Paralympic Games
| Gold medal – first place | 1992 Barcelona | Individual foil 3-4 |
| Gold medal – first place | 1996 Atlanta | Team épée |
| Gold medal – first place | 1996 Atlanta | Team foil |
| Gold medal – first place | 2000 Sydney | Individual foil A |
| Silver medal – second place | 1992 Barcelona | Team épée |
| Silver medal – second place | 2000 Sydney | Team foil |
| Bronze medal – third place | 1996 Atlanta | Individual foil A |
| Bronze medal – third place | 2000 Sydney | Team épée |
| Bronze medal – third place | 2004 Athens | Individual foil A |
| Bronze medal – third place | 2004 Athens | Team épée |
World IWAS Championships
| Gold medal – first place | 1990 Assen | Individual foil B |
| Gold medal – first place | 1994 Hong Kong | Individual foil A |
| Gold medal – first place | 1998 Euskirchen | Individual foil A |
| Gold medal – first place | 2002 Budapest | Team foil |
| Silver medal – second place | 1990 Assen | Team foil |
| Silver medal – second place | 1990 Assen | Team épée |
| Silver medal – second place | 1994 Hong Kong | Team foil |
| Silver medal – second place | 1994 Hong Kong | Team épée |
| Silver medal – second place | 1998 Euskirchen | Individual épée A |
| Silver medal – second place | 2002 Budapest | Team épée |
| Bronze medal – third place | 1990 Assen | Team épée |
European IWAS Championships
| Gold medal – first place | 1991 Malle | Team foil |
| Gold medal – first place | 1991 Malle | Team épée |
| Gold medal – first place | 1995 Blackpool | Team foil |
| Gold medal – first place | 1995 Blackpool | Team épée |
| Gold medal – first place | 1997 Paris | Team foil |
| Silver medal – second place | 1995 Blackpool | Individual épée A |
| Silver medal – second place | 1997 Paris | Team épée |
| Silver medal – second place | 1997 Paris | Individual foil A |
| Silver medal – second place | 2001 Madrid | Individual foil A |
| Silver medal – second place | 2009 Warsaw | Team foil |
| Bronze medal – third place | 1995 Blackpool | Individual foil A |
| Bronze medal – third place | 2009 Warsaw | Team épée |
| Bronze medal – third place | 2009 Warsaw | Individual épée A |

Patricia Picot (born 20 May 1969) is a French retired wheelchair fencer who competed at international fencing competitions. She is a four-time Paralympic champion, four-time World champion and five-time European medalist.
