= Ernesto Garrido =

Cuban Paralympic swimmer

Medal record

Swimming

Representing Cuba

Paralympic Games
| Silver medal – second place | 1992 Barcelona | 50 metre freestyle - S10 |

Ernesto Garrido is a paralympic swimmer from Cuba competing mainly in category S10 events.

Ernesto competed in three paralympics, in his first games in 1992 though he was entered in the athletics shot put and discus he didn't compete in them and instead competed in the pool. He competed in the 100m freestyle, winning his heat but only managing fourth in the final, the 50m freestyle where he again won his heat but was beaten in the final by Italian Gianluca Saini who set a new world record, the 200m medley finishing last in the final and the 400m freestyle where despite setting a world record in the heat and swimming faster in the final still ended up fourth.
