= Chan Yui Chong =

Hong Kong wheelchair fencer

Chan Yui-chong
Personal information
- Nationality: Hong Kong
- Born: 4 January 1983 (age 43)

Sport
- Sport: Wheelchair fencing
Medal record
Women's wheelchair fencing
Representing Hong Kong
Asian Para Games
Gold medal – first place	2010 Guangzhou	Foil B
Gold medal – first place	2014 Incheon	Foil B
Silver medal – second place	2010 Guangzhou	Team épée
Silver medal – second place	2014 Incheon	Épée B
Bronze medal – third place	2010 Guangzhou	Épée B
IWAS World Championships
Gold medal – first place	2016 Hong Kong	Foil B
Silver medal – second place	2013 Budapest	Foil B
Bronze medal – third place	2016 Hong Kong	Épée B
Paralympic Games
Gold medal – first place	2004 Athens	Épée team
Gold medal – first place	2004 Athens	Foil B
Gold medal – first place	2004 Athens	Foil team
Gold medal – first place	2008 Beijing	Épée B
Gold medal – first place	2008 Beijing	Foil B
Silver medal – second place	2004 Athens	Épée B
Silver medal – second place	2016 Rio de Janeiro	Épée team
Bronze medal – third place	2012 London	Épée B
Bronze medal – third place	2012 London	Epée team
Bronze medal – third place	2016 Rio de Janeiro	Épée B

Chan Yui-chong (born 4 January 1983) is a Hong Kong wheelchair fencer who has been part of the territory's team since 2002. She has competed for Hong Kong at the Summer Paralympics, the Asian Para Games and at the IWAS World Championships.

== Sporting career ==
Chan Yui-chong joined the Hong Kong wheelchair fencing team in 2002. She took up the sport after being inspired by a music video featuring a fencer. At the 2004 Summer Paralympics in Athens, Greece, she won three gold medals and a silver in the épée B at the age of 21. She won two further gold medals at the 2008 Games in Beijing, China, including a defeat of China's Yao Fang in the final of the épée B.

At the 2012 Summer Paralympics, Chan made it to the semi-finals in the épée B competition once more. She was defeated 15-14 by Zhou Jingjing of China. However, when she fought Germany's Simone Briese-Baetke, Chan was this time victorious by the same scoreline, winning the bronze medal event for the second time in a row. Her further success was praised by Chief Executive of Hong Kong Leung Chun-ying. Chan competed at the 2014 Asian Para Games in Incheon, South Korea, where she won gold in the foil B, but placed second in the épée B following defeat by China's JingJing Zhou.

=== Personal life ===
Chan enjoys fishing as a hobby. She is married to fellow wheelchair fencer Tam Chik-sum.
