= Johan Reekers =

Dutch Paralympic volleyball player and cyclist

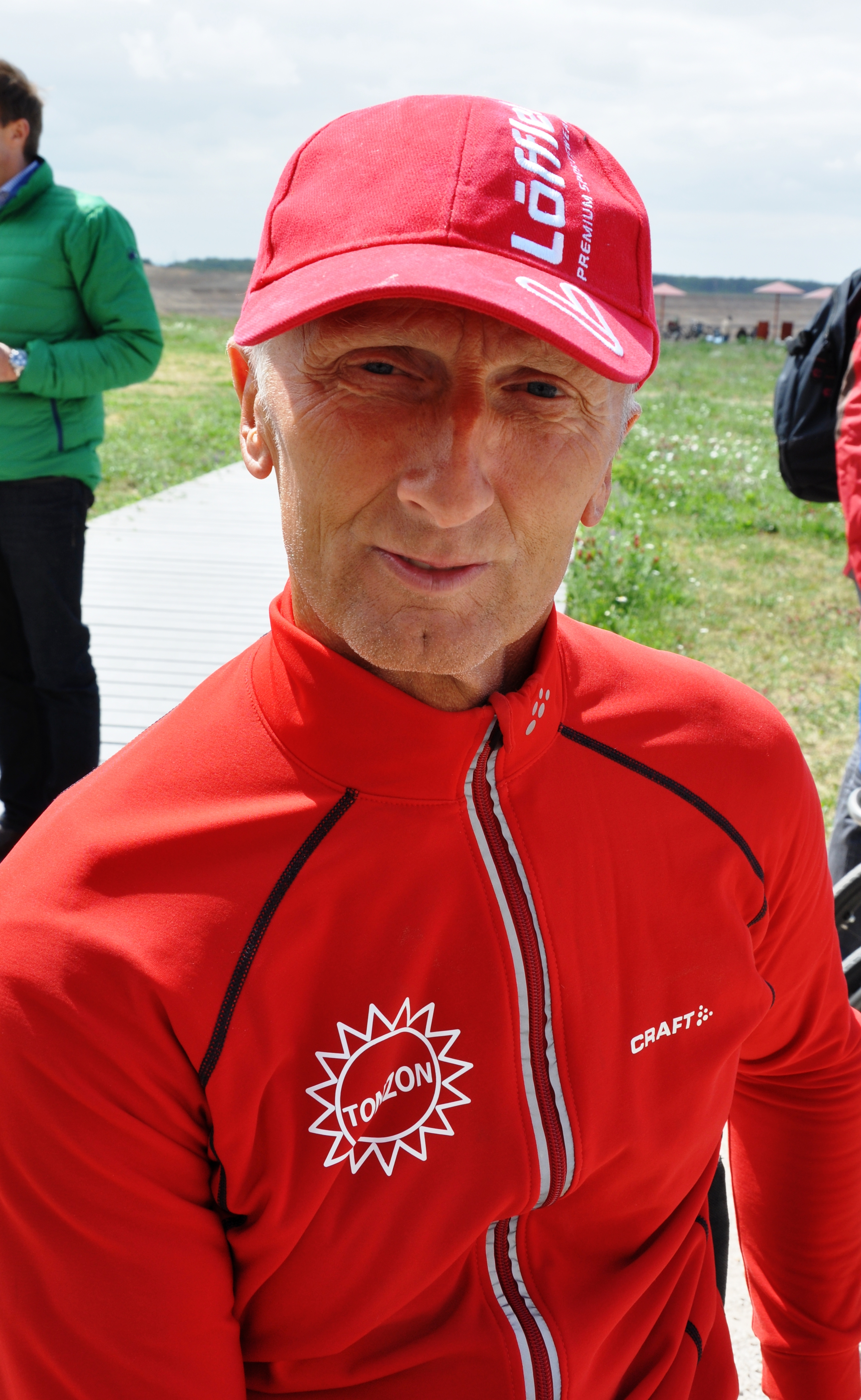
- Reekers in 2016

Personal information
- Nationality: Dutch
- Born: 28 December 1957 (age 68)

Sport
- Country: Netherlands
- Sport: Sitting volleyball Handbiking
Medal record
Representing Netherlands
Men's sitting volleyball
Paralympic Games
Gold medal – first place	1980 Arnhem	Men's sitting
Gold medal – first place	1984 New York/Stoke Mandeville	Men's sitting
Silver medal – second place	1992 Barcelona/Madrid	Men's sitting

Johan Reekers (born 28 December 1957 in Enschede) is a Dutch Paralympian who was born without legs. He was on the gold medal-winning Dutch sitting volleyball teams of 1980 and 1984. At the 1992 Summer Paralympics the team won silver. In 2002 he began handbiking. He competed for the Netherlands at the 2012 Summer Paralympics in cycling. This was his eighth Paralympics.
