= Silke Schwarz =

German Paralympic wheelchair fencer

Personal information
- Nationality: German

Sport
- Country: Germany
- Sport: Wheelchair fencing
Medal record
Paralympic Games
Gold medal – first place	1996 Atlanta	Individual foil A
Silver medal – second place	1996 Atlanta	Épée team
Silver medal – second place	2000 Sydney	Individual Foil A
Silver medal – second place	2000 Sydney	Épée team
Bronze medal – third place	1996 Atlanta	Foil team
Bronze medal – third place	2000 Sydney	Foil team

Silke Schwarz is a German wheelchair fencer.

Schwarz competed at the 1996 Paralympics, where she won a gold medal in the individual foil A event, a silver medal in the épée team and a bronze medal in the foil team event, and at the 2000 Paralympics, where she won silver medals in the individual épée A and épée team events and a bronze medal in the foil team event.
