= Lily Anggreny =

German Paralympic athlete

Personal information
- Nationality: German
- Born: 15 September 1960 (age 66) Sumatra, Indonesia

Sport
- Country: Germany
- Sport: Athletics
- Disability: Polio
- Disability class: T52
Medal record
Track and field
Representing Germany
Paralympic Games
Gold medal – first place	1992 Barcelona	Women's 5,000m TW3-4
Silver medal – second place	1992 Barcelona	Women's 10,000m TW3-4
Bronze medal – third place	1992 Barcelona	Women's marathon TW3-4
Bronze medal – third place	1996 Atlanta	Women's 10,000m T52-53

Lily Anggreny (born September 15, 1960) is a retired German wheelchair racer who has competed in three Summer Paralympic Games and two Summer Olympic Games. She was the tenth child of Chinese parents then emigrated to Germany aged 19. She studied English and sinology in Germany. In 2008, she switched to handcycling.
