= Iryna Lukianenko =

Ukrainian figure skater (born 1983)

Personal information
- Native name: Ірина Володимирівна Лук'яненко
- Full name: Iryna Volodymyrivna Lukianenko
- Other names: Russian: Ирина Владимировна Лукьяненко: Irina Vladimirovna Lukianenko
- Born: 13 September 1983 (age 43) Kyiv, Ukrainian SSR, Soviet Union
- Height: 1.68 m (5 ft 6 in)

Figure skating career
- Country: Ukraine
- Coach: Natalia Butuzova
- Skating club: Ukraina Kyiv
- Began skating: 1989
- Retired: 2005

Iryna Volodymyrivna Lukianenko (Ukrainian: Ірина Володимирівна Лук'яненко; born 13 September 1983) is a Ukrainian figure skating coach and former competitor. She won bronze medals at the 2001 Karl Schäfer Memorial, 2003 Skate Israel, and three Ukrainian Championships. She qualified for the free skate at the 2003 World Junior Championships in Ostrava and finished 23rd overall. She was coached by Natalia Butuzova in Kyiv.

Lukianenko coached in Kyiv from 2010 to 2013 and then relocated to Kryvyi Rih. Her student was Vladyslav Pikhovych, who was a member of the Ukrainian student national team and participated at the 2017 Winter Universiade.

== Programs ==
Season	Short program	Free skating
2002–04	The Question of U by Prince	Canone inverso by Ennio Morricone
2001–02	Reflection of Passion by Yanni	The Four Seasons by Antonio Vivaldi performed by the Jacques Loussier Orchestra

== Competitive highlights ==
JGP: Junior Grand Prix

International
Event	99–00	00–01	01–02	02–03	03–04	04–05
Golden Spin				14th		14th
Nebelhorn Trophy					14th	
Schäfer Memorial			3rd	12th		
Skate Israel					3rd	
Winter Universiade		9th				17th
International: Junior
Junior Worlds				23rd		
JGP Bulgaria			7th			
JGP Czech Rep.		10th				
JGP Italy			13th			
JGP Ukraine		8th				
National
Ukrainian Champ.	4th	3rd	4th	4th	3rd	3rd
J. = Junior level
