= Claudia Meier =

German Paralympic athlete

Medal record

Paralympic athletics

Representing Germany

Paralympic Games
Silver medal – second place	1992 Barcelona	400 metres - B2
Silver medal – second place	1992 Barcelona	800 metres - B2
Silver medal – second place	1992 Barcelona	1500 metres - B2
Silver medal – second place	1992 Barcelona	3000 metres - B2
Silver medal – second place	1996 Atlanta	800 metres - T10-11
Silver medal – second place	1996 Atlanta	1500 metres - T10-11
Silver medal – second place	1996 Atlanta	3000 metres - T10-11
Silver medal – second place	2000 Sydney	1500 metres - T12
Silver medal – second place	2000 Sydney	5000 metres - T12

Claudia Meier is a paralympic athlete from Germany, competing mainly in category T12 middle-distance events.

Claudia has competed at 3 Paralympics and won nine silver medals, in distances ranging from 400m to 5000m. For all bar one of those silvers, she finished behind Russian Rima Batalova.
