= Esther Weber =

German wheelchair fencer (born 1967)

Personal information
- Born: 23 December 1967 (age 58)

Sport
- Country: Germany
- Sport: Wheelchair fencing
Medal record
Paralympic Games
Gold medal – first place	1992 Barcelona	Sword
Silver medal – second place	1996 Atlanta	Épée Team
Silver medal – second place	2000 Sydney	Epee Team
Silver medal – second place	2000 Sydney	Foil
Bronze medal – third place	1992 Barcelona	Foil
Bronze medal – third place	1996 Atlanta	Sword
Bronze medal – third place	1996 Atlanta	Foil
Bronze medal – third place	1996 Atlanta	Foil Team
Bronze medal – third place	2000 Sydney	Sword
Bronze medal – third place	2000 Sydney	Foil Team
World Championships
Bronze medal – third place	1990 Assen
Bronze medal – third place	1990 Assen
Silver medal – second place	1994 Hong Kong
Bronze medal – third place	1994 Hong Kong
Gold medal – first place	1998 Euskirchen
Bronze medal – third place	1998 Euskirchen
Silver medal – second place	2002 Budapest
Silver medal – second place	2002 Budapest
Silver medal – second place	2002 Budapest

Esther Weber (born 23 December 1967) is a German wheelchair fencer. She won gold at the 1992 Paralympics in the Épée and bronze in the foil.

Weber won a number of titles in wheelchair fencing both at the Paralympics and World Championships between 1990 and 2002. A school in Emmendingen for children with disabilities was named Esther-Weber-Schule after her in 2008.
