= Gema Hassen-Bey =

Spanish journalist and wheelchair fencer

Gema Victoria Hassen-Bey González
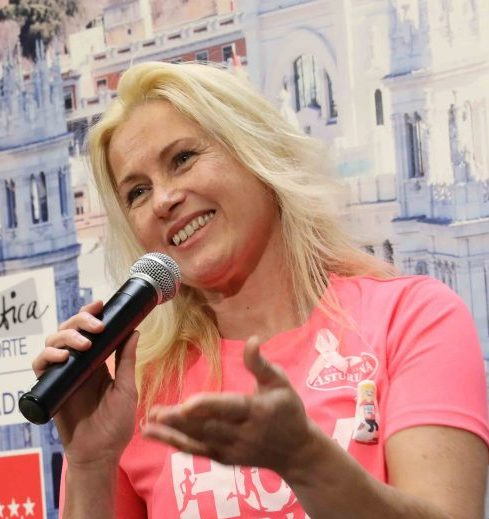
- in 2017
- Born: 2 July 1967 (age 58); Madrid
- Occupation: journalist
- Known for: Paralympic wheelchair fencer

Gema Victoria Hassen-Bey González (born 2 July 1967) is a Spanish journalist and wheelchair fencer. She has competed at several Paralympics and she won two medals in 1992. She was the flag bearer for Spain in 2004. She has taken part in wheelchair mountain climbing.

== Life ==
Hassen-Bey was born in Madrid in 1967. She became paraplegic after a car accident when she was four years old. She spent a year bedbound after an operation on her spine.

Hassen-Bey fenced at the 1992 Summer Paralympics and won two bronze medals as an individual in the épée category B wheelchair fencing and in the women's team épée. At the 1996 Summer Paralympics, she won another bronze medal in the women's épée team. She fenced at the 2000 Summer Paralympics in Sydney, at the 2004 Summer Paralympics in Athens (where she was the flag bearer) and at the 2008 Summer Paralympics in Beijing.

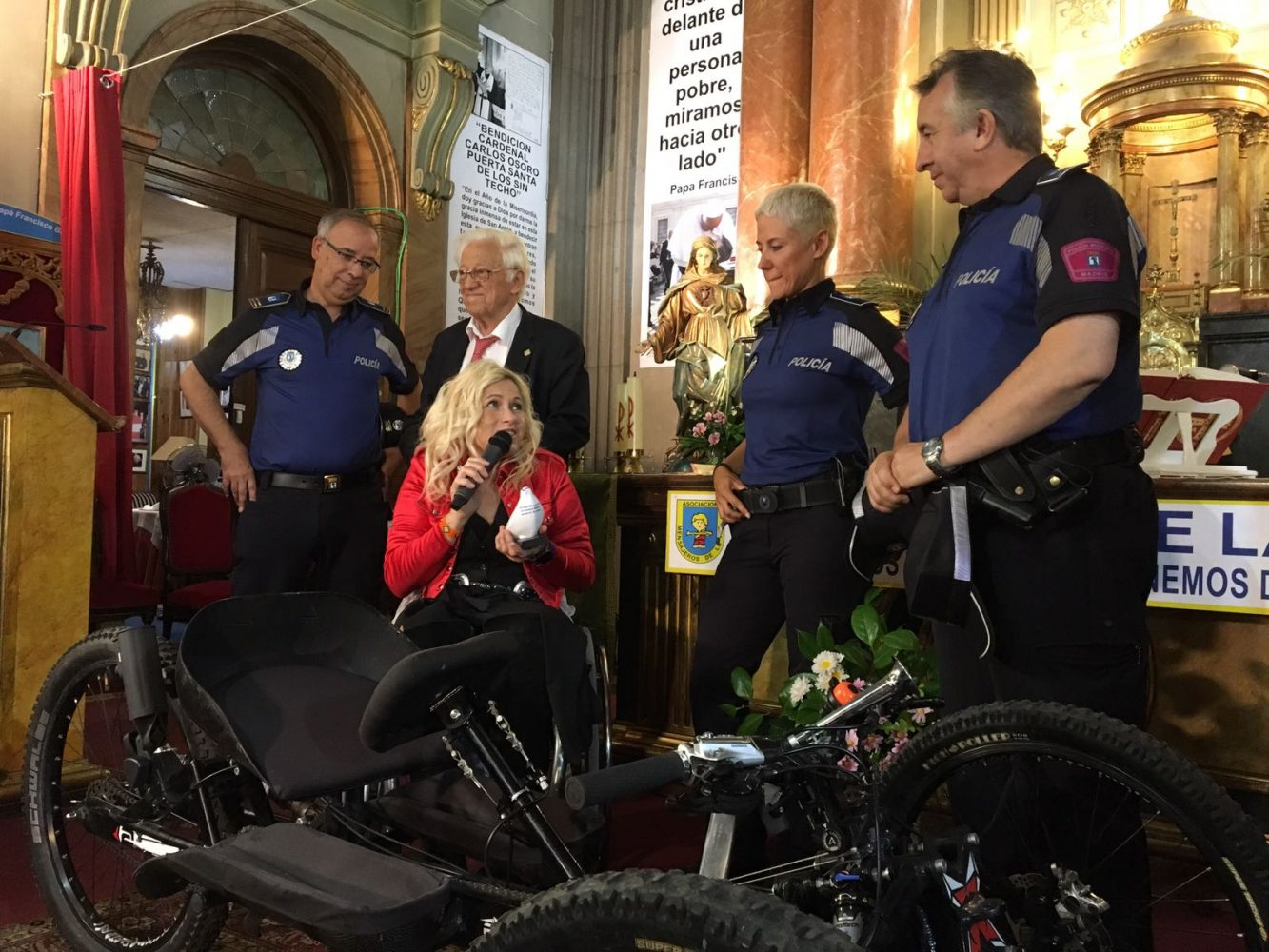
González with her specialist bike in 2017 as the police returned it to her

Hassen-Bey planned to become the first woman in a wheelchair to reach the top of Kilimanjaro, having tried in 2017 to reach the top of Spain's highest peak, Teide, on the island of Tenerife. She abandoned the climb at over 3,700 metres but became the first Paralympic athlete in a wheelchair to reach 3,000 meters altitude using only her arms. The challenges are sponsored and the objectives include the development of a handbike that is capable of allowing her to climb these mountains.

In 2017 her specialist bike was stolen when she parked it in a space reserved for people with disabilities while attending a Pride event. The police were able to return it to her the following day.

== Personal life ==
She revealed that she was bisexual when she was asked to talk about combating homophobia. She believes she is the only Paralympic athlete to come out. As an open bisexual she is regarded as one of the most influential in Spain.
