= Holger Kimmig =

German Paralympic swimmer (born 1975)

Personal information
- Born: 5 March 1975 (age 51) Appenweier, West Germany

Sport
- Country: Germany
- Sport: Paralympic swimming
- Disability class: S8
Medal record
Paralympic swimming
Representing Germany
Paralympic Games
Gold medal – first place	1996 Atlanta	100m backstroke S8
Gold medal – first place	1996 Atlanta	4x100m freestyle relay S7-10
Gold medal – first place	1996 Atlanta	4x100m medley relay S7-10
Gold medal – first place	2000 Sydney	100m backstroke S8
Silver medal – second place	1992 Barcelona	100m backstroke S8
Silver medal – second place	1992 Barcelona	4x100m freestyle S7-10
Silver medal – second place	1996 Atlanta	100m freestyle S8
Silver medal – second place	1996 Atlanta	400m freestyle S8
Silver medal – second place	1996 Atlanta	200m individual medley SM8
Silver medal – second place	2000 Sydney	100m freestyle S8
Bronze medal – third place	1992 Barcelona	50m freestyle S8
Bronze medal – third place	1992 Barcelona	100m freestyle S8
Bronze medal – third place	1992 Barcelona	400m freestyle S8
Bronze medal – third place	1996 Atlanta	50m freestyle S8
Bronze medal – third place	2000 Sydney	200m individual medley SM8
World Championships
Gold medal – first place	1994 Malta	100m backstroke S8
Gold medal – first place	1994 Malta	4x100m medley relay S7-10
Silver medal – second place	1994 Malta	50m freestyle S8
Silver medal – second place	1994 Malta	200m individual medley SM8
Silver medal – second place	1998 Christchurch	100m backstroke S8
Bronze medal – third place	1994 Malta	400m freestyle S8
Bronze medal – third place	1998 Christchurch	100m freestyle S8

Holger Kimmig (born 5 March 1975) is a German retired swimmer who competed at the 1992, 1996 and 2000 Paralympic Games.

Competing in the S8 100 metre backstroke, Kimmig finished in a dead heat with David Malone and they were both awarded gold medals. They finished with a time of 1:09.90.
