= Horst Beyer (Paralympian) =

German Paralympic athlete

Medal record

Paralympic athletics

Representing West Germany

Paralympic Games
Gold medal – first place	1992 Barcelona	Discus throw THS2
Gold medal – first place	1996 Atlanta	Pentathlon P42
Silver medal – second place	1996 Atlanta	Discus throw F42
Bronze medal – third place	1996 Atlanta	Shot put F42
Bronze medal – third place	2000 Sydney	Pentathlon P42

Horst Beyer is a Paralympian athlete from Germany competing mainly in category P42 pentathlon events.

== Biography ==
He competed for West Germany in the 1988 Summer Paralympics in Seoul, South Korea. There he finished sixth in the men's Discus throw - A2A9 event, finished fifth in the men's Javelin throw - A2A9 event and finished sixth in the men's Shot put - A2A9 event. Following reunification he competed for Germany in the 1992 Summer Paralympics in Barcelona, Spain. There he won a gold medal in the men's Discus throw - THS2 event and finished fourth in the men's Pentathlon - PS3 event. He also competed at the 1996 Summer Paralympics in Atlanta, United States. There he won a gold medal in the men's Pentathlon - P42 event, a silver medal in the men's Discus throw - F42 event and a bronze medal in the men's Shot put - F42 event. He also competed at the 2000 Summer Paralympics in Sydney, Australia. There he won a bronze medal in the men's Pentathlon - P42 event, finished sixth in the men's Discus throw - F42 event and finished seventh in the men's Shot put - F42 event.
