= Czechoslovakia at the 1992 Summer Paralympics =

- IPC code: TCH

in Barcelona
- Competitors: 29
- Medals Ranked 26th: Gold 4 Silver 3 Bronze 6 Total 13

Summer Paralympics appearances (overview)
- 1972; 1976; 1980; 1984; 1988; 1992

Other related appearances
- Czech Republic (1994–); Slovakia (1994–)

Czechoslovakia competed at the 1992 Summer Paralympics in Barcelona, Spain. 29 competitors from Czechoslovakia won 13 medals, including 4 gold, 3 silver and 6 bronze and finished 26th in the medal table.

== See also ==
- Czechoslovakia at the Paralympics
- Czechoslovakia at the 1992 Summer Olympics
