= Slovakia at the Paralympics =

- IPC code: SVK
- NPC: Slovak Paralympic Committee
- Website: www.spv.sk
- Medals: Gold 45 Silver 44 Bronze 50 Total 139

Summer appearances
- 1996; 2000; 2004; 2008; 2012; 2016; 2020; 2024

Winter appearances
- 1994; 1998; 2002; 2006; 2010; 2014; 2018; 2022; 2026

Other related appearances
- Czechoslovakia (1972–1992)

Slovakia as such made its Paralympic Games début at the 1994 Winter Paralympics in Lillehammer, following the break-up of Czechoslovakia, which had taken part in the Paralympics from 1972 to 1992. Slovakia has taken part in every edition of both the Summer and Winter Paralympics since then.

Slovakia's most successful athletes are Henrieta Farkašová and guide Natália Šubrtová, who with four gold and one silver in Alpine skiing , became the most successful athletes of the whole 2018 Pyeongchang, which they achieved as the first in their country's history. Their total medal count of nine gold, two silver and one bronze from 2010 Vancouver, 2014 Sochi and 2018 Pyeongchang makes them Slovakia's most successful Paralympians.

Among pioneers, Jozef Miština won four of the country's five medals at the 1994 Games: three silver and a bronze in alpine skiing. He won four medals again (two silver and two bronze) in 1998.

In 2010, Slovakia won its first Winter gold medals, with Henrieta Farkašová and Jakub Krako each winning three gold and a silver in visually impaired alpine skiing. This led to Slovakia's best result at the Paralympic Games: the country ranked fourth on the medal table.

== Medal tallies ==
=== Medals by Summer Paralympics ===
Games	Athletes	Gold	Silver	Bronze	Total	Rank
(United States) 1996 Atlanta	28	2	4	5	11	39
(Australia) 2000 Sydney	46	3	5	5	13	36
(Greece) 2004 Athens	37	5	3	4	12	30
(China) 2008 Beijing	35	2	3	1	6	39
(United Kingdom) 2012 London	34	2	1	3	6	41
(Brazil) 2016 Rio de Janeiro	29	5	3	3	11	25
(Japan) 2020 Tokyo	27	5	2	4	11	26
(France) 2024 Paris	26	3	2	0	5	35
(United States) 2028 Los Angeles	future event					
(Australia) 2032 Brisbane	future event					
Total		27	23	25	75	44

=== Medals by Winter Paralympics ===
Games	Athletes	Gold	Silver	Bronze	Total	Rank
(Norway) 1994 Lillehammer	11	0	3	2	5	19
(Japan) 1998 Nagano	18	0	6	4	10	18
(United States) 2002 Salt Lake City	14	0	3	6	9	20
(Italy) 2006 Turin	17	0	1	1	2	13
(Canada) 2010 Vancouver	13	6	2	3	11	4
(Russia) 2014 Sochi	16	3	2	2	7	6
(South Korea) 2018 Pyeongchang	11	6	4	1	11	7
(China) 2022 Beijing	28	3	0	3	6	10
(Italy) 2026 Milan-Cortina	27	0	0	3	3	26
(France) 2030 French Alps	Future event					
(United States) 2034 Utah	Future event					
Total		18	21	25	64	16

=== Medals by summer sport ===
Sport	Gold	Silver	Bronze	Total
Table tennis	7	8	9	24
Shooting	5	3	1	9
Road cycling	4	4	3	11
Boccia	3	1	0	4
Track cycling	3	1	1	5
Swimming	2	4	3	9
Athletics	2	1	5	9
Archery	1	0	2	3
Volleyball	0	1	1	2
Total	27	23	25	75

=== Medals by winter sport ===
Sport	Gold	Silver	Bronze	Total
Alpine skiing	18	18	24	58
Biathlon	0	2	1	3
Cross-country skiing	0	1	0	1
Total	18	21	25	64

== List of medalists ==
=== Summer Paralympics ===
Medal	Name	Games	Sport	Event
Gold	Anton Sluka	(United States) 1996 Atlanta	Athletics	Men's Marathon T12
Gold	Andrej Zaťko	(United States) 1996 Atlanta	Swimming	Men's 50 m butterfly S3
Silver	Pavel Takáč; Miroslav Jambor	(United States) 1996 Atlanta	Cycling	Men's 200 m sprint tandem open
Silver	Margita Prokeinová	(United States) 1996 Atlanta	Swimming	Women's 50 m butterfly S7
Silver	Ladislav Gáspár	(United States) 1996 Atlanta	Table tennis	Men's Open 6–10
Silver	Men's volleyball team: Michal Csader Pavol Betin Michal Nestorik Richard Kovac Jaroslav Makovnik Peter Moravcik Andrej Marcin Pavol Sedlak Marek Tomsik Lubomir Novosad Jozef Mihalco	(United States) 1996 Atlanta	Volleyball	Men's Standing volleyball team
Bronze	František Gödri	(United States) 1996 Atlanta	Athletics	Men's Pentathlon P11
Bronze	Andrej Zaťko	(United States) 1996 Atlanta	Swimming	Men's 50 m breaststroke SB2
Bronze	Margita Prokeinová	(United States) 1996 Atlanta	Swimming	Women's 50 m freestyle S7
Bronze	Ladislav Gáspár	(United States) 1996 Atlanta	Table tennis	Men's Singles 9
Bronze	Ladislav Gáspár; Emil Dovalovszki	(United States) 1996 Atlanta	Table tennis	Men's Teams 9–10
Gold	Radovan Kaufman	(Australia) 2000 Sydney	Cycling	Mixed 1 km time trial LC3
Gold	Pavel Kolačkovský	(Australia) 2000 Sydney	Swimming	Men's 200 m freestyle S14
Gold	Alena Kánová	(Australia) 2000 Sydney	Table tennis	Women's Singles 3
Silver	Anton Sluka	(Australia) 2000 Sydney	Athletics	Men's Marathon T13
Silver	Margita Prokeinová	(Australia) 2000 Sydney	Swimming	Women's 50 m butterfly S7
Silver	Margita Prokeinová	(Australia) 2000 Sydney	Swimming	Women's 200 m individual medley SM7
Silver	Viera Kašparová	(Australia) 2000 Sydney	Table tennis	Women's Singles 11
Silver	Richard Csejtey; Ladislav Gáspár	(Australia) 2000 Sydney	Table tennis	Men's Teams 9
Bronze	Imrich Lyócsa	(Australia) 2000 Sydney	Archery	Men's individual standing
Bronze	Norbert Holík	(Australia) 2000 Sydney	Athletics	Men's Pentathlon P13
Bronze	Ján Szojka; Juraj Petrovič	(Australia) 2000 Sydney	Cycling	Men's sprint tandem open
Bronze	Pavel Kolačkovský	(Australia) 2000 Sydney	Swimming	Men's 100 m freestyle S14
Bronze	Men's volleyball team: Jaroslav Makovník Peter Nádaský Peter Meszáros Pavol Pavlačič Richard Kováč Peter Moravčík Andrej Marcin Pavol Sedlák Jozef Mihalco Ľubomír Novosád Juraj Košírel Marek Tomšík	(Australia) 2000 Sydney	Volleyball	Men's Standing volleyball team
Gold	Imrich Lyócsa	(Greece) 2004 Athens	Archery	Men's individual standing
Gold	Marek Margoč	(Greece) 2004 Athens	Athletics	Men's Shot put F40
Gold	Rastislav Tureček	(Greece) 2004 Athens	Cycling	Men's handcycle road race
Gold	Ján Riapoš	(Greece) 2004 Athens	Table tennis	Men's Singles class 2
Gold	Ladislav Gáspár	(Greece) 2004 Athens	Table tennis	Men's Singles class 10
Silver	Rastislav Tureček	(Greece) 2004 Athens	Cycling	Men's handcycle time trial
Silver	Viera Mikulášiková	(Greece) 2004 Athens	Swimming	Men's 50 m freestyle S10
Silver	Ján Riapoš; Rastislav Revúcky	(Greece) 2004 Athens	Table tennis	Men's Teams class 1–2
Bronze	Július Hutka	(Greece) 2004 Athens	Athletics	Men's Shot put F57
Bronze	Richard Csejtey	(Greece) 2004 Athens	Table tennis	Men's Singles class 8
Bronze	Richard Csejtey; Miroslav Mitas	(Greece) 2004 Athens	Table tennis	Men's Teams class 8
Bronze	Alena Kánová	(Greece) 2004 Athens	Table tennis	Women's Singles class 3
Gold	Veronika Vadovičová	(China) 2008 Beijing	Shooting	Women's 10 m air rifle standing SH1
Gold	Ján Riapoš; Rastislav Revucky	(China) 2008 Beijing	Table tennis	Men's Teams class 1–2
Silver	Rastislav Tureček	(China) 2008 Beijing	Cycling	Men's Time trial HC A
Silver	Richard Csejtey; Miroslav Jambor	(China) 2008 Beijing	Table tennis	Men's Teams class 6–8
Silver	Alena Kánová	(China) 2008 Beijing	Table tennis	Women's Individual - Class 3
Bronze	Miroslav Jambor	(China) 2008 Beijing	Table tennis	Men's Individual - Class 8
Gold	Ján Riapoš	(United Kingdom) 2012 London	Table tennis	Men's Individual – Class 2
Gold	Ján Riapoš; Martin Ludrovský; Rastislav Revúcky	(United Kingdom) 2012 London	Table tennis	Men's Team – Class 2
Silver	Richard Csejtey	(United Kingdom) 2012 London	Table tennis	Men's Individual – Class 8
Bronze	Vladislav Janovjak	(United Kingdom) 2012 London	Cycling	Men's Road race B
Bronze	Veronika Vadovičová	(United Kingdom) 2012 London	Shooting	Women's 50m rifle 3 positions SH1
Bronze	Alena Kánová	(United Kingdom) 2012 London	Table tennis	Women's Individual - Class 3
Gold	Róbert Ďurkovič; Michaela Balcová; Samuel Andrejčík	(Brazil) 2016 Rio de Janeiro	Boccia	Mixed Pairs BC4
Gold	Jozef Metelka	(Brazil) 2016 Rio de Janeiro	Cycling	Men's Road race Time trial C4
Gold	Jozef Metelka	(Brazil) 2016 Rio de Janeiro	Cycling	Men's Track Individual pursuit C4
Gold	Veronika Vadovičová	(Brazil) 2016 Rio de Janeiro	Shooting	Women's 10m air rifle standing SH1
Gold	Veronika Vadovičová	(Brazil) 2016 Rio de Janeiro	Shooting	Mixed 10m air rifle prone SH1
Silver	Samuel Andrejčík	(Brazil) 2016 Rio de Janeiro	Boccia	Mixed Individual BC4
Silver	Jozef Metelka	(Brazil) 2016 Rio de Janeiro	Cycling	Men's Track 1 km time trial C4-5
Silver	Veronika Vadovičová	(Brazil) 2016 Rio de Janeiro	Shooting	Women's 50m rifle 3 positions SH1
Bronze	Peter Kinik	(Brazil) 2016 Rio de Janeiro	Archery	Men's individual compound W1
Bronze	Marián Kuřeja	(Brazil) 2016 Rio de Janeiro	Athletics	Men's club throw – F51
Bronze	Patrik Kuril	(Brazil) 2016 Rio de Janeiro	Cycling	Men's Road race Time trial C4
Gold	Jozef Metelka	(Japan) 2020 Tokyo	Cycling	Men's Track Individual pursuit C4
Gold	Patrik Kuril	(Japan) 2020 Tokyo	Cycling	Men's road time trial C4
Gold	Samuel Andrejčík	(Japan) 2020 Tokyo	Boccia	Mixed individual BC4
Gold	Samuel Andrejčík; Michaela Balcová; Martin Strehársky	(Japan) 2020 Tokyo	Boccia	Mixed pairs BC4
Gold	Veronika Vadovičová	(Japan) 2020 Tokyo	Shooting	Mixed R6 50 metre rifle prone SH1
Silver	Jozef Metelka	(Japan) 2020 Tokyo	Cycling	Men's road time trial C4
Silver	Alena Kánová	(Japan) 2020 Tokyo	Table tennis	Women's Individual - Class 3
Bronze	Jozef Metelka	(Japan) 2020 Tokyo	Cycling	Men's 1000 m time trial C4-5
Bronze	Boris Trávníček; Peter Mihálik	(Japan) 2020 Tokyo	Table tennis	Men's team – Class 4–5
Bronze	Ján Riapoš; Martin Ludrovský	(Japan) 2020 Tokyo	Table tennis	Men's team – Class 1–2
Bronze	Marián Kuřeja	(Japan) 2020 Tokyo	Athletics	Men's club throw – F51
Gold	Jozef Metelka	(France) 2024 Paris	Cycling	Men's Track Individual pursuit C4
Gold	Ján Riapoš; Peter Lovaš	(France) 2024 Tokyo	Table tennis	Men's doubles MD4
Gold	Veronika Vadovičová	(France) 2024 Paris	Shooting	R3 Mixed 10 metre rifle prone SH1
Silver	Radoslav Malenovský	(France) 2024 Paris	Shooting	R3 Mixed 10 metre rifle prone SH1
Silver	Veronika Vadovičová	(France) 2024 Paris	Shooting	R8 – 50 m rifle 3 position SH1

=== Winter Paralympics ===
Medal	Name	Games	Sport	Event
Silver	Jozef Miština	(Norway) 1994 Lillehammer	Alpine skiing	Men's Downhill LW1/3
Silver	Jozef Miština	(Norway) 1994 Lillehammer	Alpine skiing	Men's giant slalom LW1/3
Silver	Jozef Miština	(Norway) 1994 Lillehammer	Alpine skiing	Men's slalom LW1/3
Bronze	Jozef Miština	(Norway) 1994 Lillehammer	Alpine skiing	Men's Super-G LW1/3
Bronze	Marcela Mišunová	(Norway) 1994 Lillehammer	Alpine skiing	Women's slalom LW6/8
Silver	Jozef Miština	(Japan) 1998 Nagano	Alpine skiing	Men's giant slalom LW1,3,5/7
Silver	Štefan Kopčík; Guide: Renáta Karamanová	(Japan) 1998 Nagano	Alpine skiing	Men's giant slalom B2
Silver	Jozef Miština	(Japan) 1998 Nagano	Alpine skiing	Men's slalom LW1,3,5/7
Silver	Štefan Kopčík; Guide: Renáta Karamanová	(Japan) 1998 Nagano	Alpine skiing	Men's slalom B2
Silver	Róbert Ďurčan	(Japan) 1998 Nagano	Alpine skiing	Men's slalom LW6/8
Silver	Miroslav Jambor	(Japan) 1998 Nagano	Biathlon	Men's 7.5 km free technique B3
Bronze	Jozef Miština	(Japan) 1998 Nagano	Alpine skiing	Men's Downhill LW1,3,5/7,9
Bronze	Štefan Kopčík; Guide: Renáta Karamanová	(Japan) 1998 Nagano	Alpine skiing	Men's Downhill B2
Bronze	Jozef Miština	(Japan) 1998 Nagano	Alpine skiing	Men's Super-G LW1,3,5/7,9
Bronze	Štefan Kopčík; Guide: Renáta Karamanová	(Japan) 1998 Nagano	Alpine skiing	Men's Super-G B2
Silver	Radomír Dudáš; Guide: Juraj Mikuláš	(United States) 2002 Salt Like City	Alpine skiing	Men's slalom B1-2
Silver	Marián Baláž; Guide: Michal Jurco	(United States) 2002 Salt Like City	Biathlon	Men's 7.5 km free technique blind
Silver	Vladimír Gajdičiar	(United States) 2002 Salt Like City	Cross-country skiing	Men's 5 km sitski LW12
Bronze	Radomír Dudáš; Guide: Juraj Mikulas	(United States) 2002 Salt Like City	Alpine skiing	Men's giant slalom B1-2
Bronze	Štefan Kopčík; Guide: Branislav Mazgut	(United States) 2002 Salt Like City	Alpine skiing	Men's slalom B1-2
Bronze	Norbert Holík; Guide: Radoslav Grus	(United States) 2002 Salt Like City	Alpine skiing	Men's slalom B3
Bronze	Iveta Chlebáková	(United States) 2002 Salt Like City	Alpine skiing	Women's giant slalom LW6/8
Bronze	Iveta Chlebáková	(United States) 2002 Salt Like City	Alpine skiing	Women's slalom LW6/8
Bronze	Jozef Mesik	(United States) 2002 Salt Like City	Biathlon	Men's 7.5 km free technique standing
Silver	Radomír Dudáš; Guide: Maroš Hudík	(Italy) 2006 Turin	Alpine skiing	Men's Super-G visually impaired
Bronze	Iveta Chlebáková	(Italy) 2006 Turin	Alpine skiing	Women's Downhill standing
Gold	Henrieta Farkašová; Guide: Natália Šubrtová	(Canada) 2010 Vancouver	Alpine skiing	Women's Super-G visually impaired
Gold	Henrieta Farkašová; Guide: Natália Šubrtová	(Canada) 2010 Vancouver	Alpine skiing	Women's giant slalom visually impaired
Gold	Henrieta Farkašová; Guide: Natália Šubrtová	(Canada) 2010 Vancouver	Alpine skiing	Women's Super Combined visually impaired
Gold	Jakub Krako; Guide: Juraj Medera	(Canada) 2010 Vancouver	Alpine skiing	Men's giant slalom visually impaired
Gold	Jakub Krako; Guide: Juraj Medera	(Canada) 2010 Vancouver	Alpine skiing	Men's slalom visually impaired
Gold	Jakub Krako; Guide: Juraj Medera	(Canada) 2010 Vancouver	Alpine skiing	Men's Super Combined visually impaired
Silver	Henrieta Farkašová; Guide: Natália Šubrtová	(Canada) 2010 Vancouver	Alpine skiing	Women's Downhill visually impaired
Silver	Jakub Krako; Guide: Juraj Medera	(Canada) 2010 Vancouver	Alpine skiing	Men's Super-G visually impaired
Bronze	Petra Smaržová	(Canada) 2010 Vancouver	Alpine skiing	Women's giant slalom standing
Bronze	Miroslav Haraus; Guide: Martin Makovník	(Canada) 2010 Vancouver	Alpine skiing	Men's Super-G visually impaired
Bronze	Miroslav Haraus; Guide: Martin Makovník	(Canada) 2010 Vancouver	Alpine skiing	Men's Super Combined visually impaired
Gold	Henrieta Farkašová; Guide: Natália Šubrtová	(Russia) 2014 Sochi	Alpine skiing	Women's Downhill visually impaired
Gold	Henrieta Farkašová; Guide: Natália Šubrtová	(Russia) 2014 Sochi	Alpine skiing	Women's giant slalom visually impaired
Gold	Jakub Krako; Guide: Martin Motyka	(Russia) 2014 Sochi	Alpine skiing	Men's Super-G visually impaired
Silver	Jakub Krako; Guide: Martin Motyka	(Russia) 2014 Sochi	Alpine skiing	Men's giant slalom visually impaired
Silver	Miroslav Haraus; Guide: Maroš Hudík	(Russia) 2014 Sochi	Alpine skiing	Men's Downhill visually impaired
Bronze	Henrieta Farkašová; Guide: Natália Šubrtová	(Russia) 2014 Sochi	Alpine skiing	Women's slalom visually impaired
Bronze	Petra Smaržová	(Russia) 2014 Sochi	Alpine skiing	Women's slalom standing
Gold	Henrieta Farkašová; Guide: Natália Šubrtová	(South Korea) 2018 Pyeongchang	Alpine skiing	Women's Downhill visually impaired
Gold	Henrieta Farkašová; Guide: Natália Šubrtová	(South Korea) 2018 Pyeongchang	Alpine skiing	Women's Super-G visually impaired
Gold	Henrieta Farkašová; Guide: Natália Šubrtová	(South Korea) 2018 Pyeongchang	Alpine skiing	Women's Combined visually impaired
Gold	Henrieta Farkašová; Guide: Natália Šubrtová	(South Korea) 2018 Pyeongchang	Alpine skiing	Women's giant slalom visually impaired
Gold	Jakub Krako; Guide: Branislav Brozman	(South Korea) 2018 Pyeongchang	Alpine skiing	Men's Super-G visually impaired
Gold	Miroslav Haraus; Guide: Maroš Hudík	(South Korea) 2018 Pyeongchang	Alpine skiing	Men's Combined visually impaired
Silver	Jakub Krako; Guide: Branislav Brozman	(South Korea) 2018 Pyeongchang	Alpine skiing	Men's Downhill visually impaired
Silver	Jakub Krako; Guide: Branislav Brozman	(South Korea) 2018 Pyeongchang	Alpine skiing	Men's giant slalom visually impaired
Silver	Jakub Krako; Guide: Branislav Brozman	(South Korea) 2018 Pyeongchang	Alpine skiing	Men's slalom visually impaired
Silver	Henrieta Farkašová; Guide: Natália Šubrtová	(South Korea) 2018 Pyeongchang	Alpine skiing	Women's slalom visually impaired
Bronze	Miroslav Haraus; Guide: Maroš Hudík	(South Korea) 2018 Pyeongchang	Alpine skiing	Men's Super-G visually impaired
Gold	Henrieta Farkašová; Guide: Martin Motyka	(China) 2022 Beijing	Alpine skiing	Women's Downhill visually impaired
Gold	Henrieta Farkašová; Guide: Michal Červeň	(China) 2022 Beijing	Alpine skiing	Women's Combined visually impaired
Gold	Alexandra Rexová; Guide: Eva Trajčíková	(China) 2022 Beijing	Alpine skiing	Women's Super-G visually impaired
Bronze	Alexandra Rexová; Guide: Eva Trajčíková	(China) 2022 Beijing	Alpine skiing	Women's slalom visually impaired
Bronze	Miroslav Haraus; Guide: Maroš Hudík	(China) 2022 Beijing	Alpine skiing	Women's giant slalom visually impaired
Bronze	Miroslav Haraus; Guide: Maroš Hudík	(China) 2022 Beijing	Alpine skiing	Women's slalom visually impaired
Bronze	Alexandra Rexová; Guide: Sophia Polák	(Italy) 2026 Milan-Cortina	Alpine skiing	Women's downhill visually impaired
Bronze	Alexandra Rexová; Guide: Sophia Polák	(Italy) 2026 Milan-Cortina	Alpine skiing	Women's Super-G visually impaired
Bronze	Alexandra Rexová; Guide: Sophia Polák	(Italy) 2026 Milan-Cortina	Alpine skiing	Women's slalom visually impaired

== Most successful Slovak competitors ==
No	Athlete	Sport	1st place, gold medalist(s)	2nd place, silver medalist(s)	3rd place, bronze medalist(s)	Total
1	Henrieta Farkašová	Alpine skiing	11	2	1	14
2	Jakub Krako	Alpine skiing	5	5	0	10
3	Veronika Vadovičová	Shooting	5	2	1	8
4	Ján Riapoš	Table tennis	5	1	1	7
5	Jozef Metelka	Cycling	4	2	1	7
6	Samuel Andrejčík	Boccia	3	1	0	4
7	Rastislav Revúcky	Table tennis	2	1	0	3
8	Michaela Balcová	Boccia	2	0	0	2
9	Ladislav Gáspár	Table tennis	1	2	2	5
10	Alena Kánová	Table tennis	1	2	2	5

== See also ==
- Slovakia at the European Games
- Slovakia at the European Youth Olympic Festival
- Slovakia at the Olympics
- Slovakia at the Universiade
- Slovakia at the World Games
- Slovakia at the Youth Olympics
