= Canada at the 2000 Summer Paralympics =

- Flag of Canada
- IPC code: CAN
- NPC: Canadian Paralympic Committee
- Website: www.paralympic.ca

in Sydney
- Competitors: 166 in 16 sports
- Medals Ranked 3rd: Gold 38 Silver 33 Bronze 25 Total 96

Summer Paralympics appearances (overview)
- 1968; 1972; 1976; 1980; 1984; 1988; 1992; 1996; 2000; 2004; 2008; 2012; 2016; 2020; 2024

Canada competed at the XI Paralympic Games in Sydney, Australia from October 18 to 29, 2000. The Canadian team included 166 athletes; 113 on foot and 53 on wheelchairs. Canada finished third in the medal table and won a total of ninety-six medals; thirty-eight gold, thirty-three silver and twenty-five bronze.

Swimmer Stephanie Dixon set a Canadian record at the Games for most gold medals at a single Paralympics, Winter or Summer, with 5. The record was later tied by wheelchair racer Chantal Petitclerc in the 2004 Summer Paralympics and skier Lauren Woolstencroft in the 2010 Winter Paralympics.

== Medallists ==
Medal	Name	Sport	Event
Gold	Earle Connor	Athletics	Men's 100m T42
Gold	Jason Lachance	Athletics	Men's 200m T34
Gold	Jeff Adams	Athletics	Men's 800m T54
Gold	Jeff Adams	Athletics	Men's 1500m T54
Gold	Clayton Gerein	Athletics	Men's marathon T52
Gold	James Shaw	Athletics	Men's discus F38
Gold	Lisa Franks	Athletics	Women's 200m T52
Gold	Chantal Petitclerc	Athletics	Women's 200m T54
Gold	Lisa Franks	Athletics	Women's 400m T52
Gold	Lisa Franks	Athletics	Women's 800m T52
Gold	Chantal Petitclerc	Athletics	Women's 800m T54
Gold	Lisa Franks	Athletics	Women's 1500m T52
Gold	Nancy Morin; Nathalie Chartrand; Viviane Forest; Contessa Scott; Amy Alsop; Carrie Anton	Goalball	Women's team
Gold	Benoît Huot	Swimming	Men's 50m freestyle S10
Gold	Adam Purdy	Swimming	Men's 100m backstroke S6
Gold	Walter Wu	Swimming	Men's 100m backstroke S13
Gold	Walter Wu	Swimming	Men's 100m butterfly S13
Gold	Philippe Gagnon	Swimming	Men's 100m freestyle S10
Gold	Benoît Huot	Swimming	Men's 200m individual medley SM10
Gold	Philippe Gagnon	Swimming	Men's 400m freestyle S10
Gold	Brad Sales; Philippe Gagnon; Andrew Haley; Robert Penner; Benoît Huot; Adam Purdy	Swimming	Men's 4x100m medley relay 34 pts
Gold	Elisabeth Walker-Young	Swimming	Women's 50m butterfly S7
Gold	Danielle Campo	Swimming	Women's 50m freestyle S7
Gold	Jessica Sloan	Swimming	Women's 50m freestyle S10
Gold	Stephanie Dixon	Swimming	Women's 100m backstroke S9
Gold	Jessica Sloan	Swimming	Women's 100m breaststroke SB9
Gold	Kirby Cote	Swimming	Women's 100m breaststroke SB13
Gold	Danielle Campo	Swimming	Women's 100m freestyle S7
Gold	Stephanie Dixon	Swimming	Women's 100m freestyle S9
Gold	Jessica Sloan	Swimming	Women's 100m freestyle S10
Gold	Elisabeth Walker-Young	Swimming	Women's 200m individual medley SM7
Gold	Jessica Sloan	Swimming	Women's 200m individual medley SM10
Gold	Kirby Cote	Swimming	Women's 200m individual medley SM13
Gold	Stephanie Dixon	Swimming	Women's 400m freestyle S9
Gold	Jessica Sloan; Danielle Campo; Andrea Cole; Stephanie Dixon	Swimming	Women's 4x100m freestyle relay 34 pts
Gold	Stephanie Dixon; Jessica Sloan; Elisabeth Walker-Young; Darda Geiger	Swimming	Women's 4x100m medley relay 34 pts
Gold	David Durepos; Richard Peter; Travis Gaertner; Chris Stoutenburg; Patrick Anderson; Jaimie Borisoff; Kenneth Hall; Ross Norton; Joey Johnson; Jeff Dennis; James Treuer; Roy Henderson	Wheelchair basketball	Men's team
Gold	Sabrina Pettinicchi; Tracey Ferguson; Lori Radke; Linda Kutrowski; Jo Kelly; Michelle Stilwell; Chantal Benoit; Renee del Colle; Marnie Peters; Kendra Ohama; Marni Abbott; Jennifer Krempien	Wheelchair basketball	Women's team
Silver	Jason Lachance	Athletics	Men's 100m T34
Silver	Earle Connor	Athletics	Men's 200m T42
Silver	André Beaudoin	Athletics	Men's 200m T52
Silver	Jason Lachance	Athletics	Men's 400m T34
Silver	Jeff Adams	Athletics	Men's 400m T54
Silver	Richard Reelie	Athletics	Men's 800m T52
Silver	Jason Dunkerley	Athletics	Men's 1500m T11
Silver	Kyle Pettey	Athletics	Men's discus F35
Silver	Jacques Martin	Athletics	Men's discus F55
Silver	France Gagne	Athletics	Men's javelin F13
Silver	Kyle Pettey	Athletics	Men's shot put F35
Silver	Lisa Franks	Athletics	Women's 100m T52
Silver	Chantal Petitclerc	Athletics	Women's 100m T54
Silver	Chantal Petitclerc	Athletics	Women's 400m T54
Silver	Courtney Knight	Athletics	Women's pentathlon P13
Silver	Jean Quevillon	Cycling	Mixed bicycle time trial CP div 3
Silver	Julie Cournoyer; Alexandre Cloutier	Cycling	Mixed tandem open
Silver	Benoît Huot	Swimming	Men's 100m backstroke S10
Silver	Philippe Gagnon	Swimming	Men's 100m butterfly S10
Silver	Brian Hill	Swimming	Men's 100m butterfly S13
Silver	Benoît Huot	Swimming	Men's 100m freestyle S10
Silver	Walter Wu	Swimming	Men's 200m individual medley SM13
Silver	Benoît Huot	Swimming	Men's 400m freestyle S10
Silver	Walter Wu	Swimming	Men's 400m freestyle S13
Silver	Stephanie Dixon	Swimming	Women's 50m freestyle S9
Silver	Jessica Tuomela	Swimming	Women's 50m freestyle S11
Silver	Kirby Cote	Swimming	Women's 50m freestyle S13
Silver	Chelsey Gotell	Swimming	Women's 100m breaststroke SB13
Silver	Andrea Cole	Swimming	Women's 100m butterfly S8
Silver	Kirby Cote	Swimming	Women's 100m freestyle S13
Silver	Stephanie Dixon	Swimming	Women's 200m individual medley SM9
Silver	Danielle Campo	Swimming	Women's 400m freestyle S7
Silver	Neil Johnson; Geoff Hammond; John Przybyszewski; Jose Rebelo; Joey Stabner; Tony Quarin; Wayne Epp; Chris Rodway; Larry Matthews; Jason Migchels; Mikael Bartholdy; Lawrence Flynn	Volleyball	Men's standing
Bronze	André Beaudoin	Athletics	Men's 100m T52
Bronze	Dean Bergeron	Athletics	Men's 200m T52
Bronze	Dean Bergeron	Athletics	Men's 400m T52
Bronze	Stuart McGregor	Athletics	Men's 800m T13
Bronze	Richard Reelie	Athletics	Men's 5000m T52
Bronze	Jeff Adams	Athletics	Men's 5000m T54
Bronze	Jeff Adams; Barry Patriquin; Mathieu Blanchette; Mathieu Parent	Athletics	Men's 4x100m relay T54
Bronze	France Gagne	Athletics	Men's discus F13
Bronze	Tracey Melesko	Athletics	Women's 200m T20
Bronze	Caitlin Renneson	Athletics	Women's 400m T34
Bronze	Paul Gauthier	Boccia	Mixed individual BC3
Bronze	Alison Kabush; Paul Gauthier	Boccia	Mixed pairs BC3
Bronze	Julie Cournoyer; Alexandre Cloutier	Cycling	Mixed individual pursuit tandem open
Bronze	Pier Morten	Judo	Men's -73 kg
Bronze	David Williams; Paul Tingley; Brian MacDonald	Sailing	Three person Sonar
Bronze	Andrew Haley	Swimming	Men's 100m butterfly S9
Bronze	Walter Wu	Swimming	Men's 100m freestyle S13
Bronze	Donovan Tildesley	Swimming	Men's 200m individual medley SM11
Bronze	Tyler Emmett	Swimming	Men's 200m individual medley SM13
Bronze	Anne Cecile Polinario	Swimming	Women's 50m freestyle S10
Bronze	Chelsey Gotell	Swimming	Women's 50m freestyle S13
Bronze	Anne Cecile Polinario	Swimming	Women's 100m backstroke S10
Bronze	Anne Cecile Polinario	Swimming	Women's 100m freestyle S10
Bronze	Chelsey Gotell	Swimming	Women's 200m individual medley SM13
Bronze	Moorea Longstaff	Swimming	Women's 400m freestyle S7

=== Multi medallists ===
- Lisa Franks: 4 golds, 1 silver (track athletics)
- Chantal Petitclerc: 2 golds, 2 silvers (track athletics)
- Jeff Adams: 2 golds, 1 silver, 2 bronzes (track athletics)
- Jessica Sloan: 6 golds, 1 silver (swimming)
- Stephanie Dixon: 5 golds, 1 silver (swimming)
- Philippe Gagnon: 3 golds, 1 silver (swimming)
- Danielle Campo: 3 golds, 1 silver (swimming)
- Elisabeth Walker-Young: 3 golds (swimming)
- Benoît Huot: 2 golds, 3 silvers (swimming)
- Kirby Cote: 2 golds, 2 silvers (swimming)
- Walter Wu: 2 golds, 2 silvers (swimming)

== Other athletes ==
Bold athletes are athletes who have won a medal.

- Archery: Alec Denys and Norbert Murphy.
- Athletics: André Beaudoin, Andy Shaw, Barry Patriquin, Brent Mcmahon, Caitlin Renneson, Carl Marquis, Chantal Petitclerc, Chelsea Lariviere, Christine Campbell, Clayton Gerein, Colette Bourgonje, Colin Mathieson, Courtney Knight, Dean Bergeron, Diane Roy, Dominique Tremblay, Earle Connor, Eric Gauthier, France Gagne, Greg Dailey, Hal Merrill, Jacques Bouchard, Jacques Martin, James Shaw, Jason Delesalle, Jason Dunkerley, Jason Lachance, Jeff Adams, Joseph Radmore, Kelly Smith, Kris Vriend, Kyle Pettey, Lisa Franks, Ljiljana Ljubisic, Mathieu Blanchette, Mathieu Parent, Peter David Howe, Richard Reelie, Rick Gronman, Robert Hughes, Rob Snoek, Shane Risto, Stephen Ellefson, Stuart McGregor, Tracey Melesko.
- Boccia: François Bourbonniere, Lance Cryderman, Paul Gauthier Mirane Lanoix-Boyer, Tammy McLeod, Alison Kabush.
- Cycling: Alexandre Cloutier, Brian Cowie, Fabien Bergeron, Gary Longhi, Jean Quevillon, Mathieu Fagnan, Minetaro Van Velzen, Stephane Cote, Yvon Provencher, Julie Cournoyer.
- Goalball (Men): Dean Kozak, Eric Houle, Jeff Christy, Rob Christy, Mario Caron.
- Goalball (Women): Amy Alsop, Carrie Anton, Contessa Scott, Nancy Morin, Nathalie Chartrand, Viviane Forest.
- Judo: Pier Morten, William Morgan
- Powerlifting: Yves Bedard, Kenneth Doyle
- Sailing: Jamie Whitman, Dan McCoy, Paul Tingley, David Williams, Brian Macdonald.
- Volleyball (Men): Chris Rodway, Geoff Hammond, Jason Migchels, Joey Stabner, John Przybyszewski, Jose Rebelo, Larry Matthews, Lawrence Flynn, Mikael Bartholdy, Neil Johnson, Tony Quarin, Wayne Epp
- Shooting: Christos Trifonidis, Michael Larochelle, Glenn Mariash, Karen Van Nest
- Swimming: Adam Purdy, Andrew Haley, Benoît Huot, Brad Sales, Brian Hill, Donovan Tildesley, Philippe Gagnon, Robert Penner, Tyler Emmett, Walter Wu, Alexandra Guarascio, Andrea Cole, Anne Polinario, Chelsey Gotell, Danielle Campo, Darda Sales, Elisabeth Walker-Young, Jessica Sloan, Jessica Tuomela, Kirby Cote, Marie Dannhaeuser, Moorea Longstaff, Stephanie Dixon, Tara Carkner.
- Table tennis: Martin Pelletier and John MacPherson
- Wheelchair basketball (Men): Christopher Stoutenburg, David Durepos, James Borisoff, James Treuer, Jeffrey Dennis, Joey Johnson, Kenneth Hall, Patrick Anderson, Richard A. Peter, Ross Norton, Roy Henderson, Travis Gaertner
- Wheelchair basketball (Women): Chantal Benoit, Jennifer Krempien, Joanne Kelly, Kendra Ohama, Linda Kutrowski, Lori Radke, Marni Abbott-Peter, Marnie Peters, Michelle Stilwell, Renee Delcolle, Sabrina Pettinicchi, Tracey Ferguson
- Wheelchair fencing: Carrie Loffree, Ruth Sylvie Morel
- Wheelchair rugby (Men): Allan Semeniuk, Christopher Daw, Daniel Paradis, Dany Belanger, Daryl Stubel, David Willsie, Garett Hickling, Ian Chan, Kirby Kranabetter, Martin Larocque, Mike Bacon, Patrice Simard
- Wheelchair tennis: Paul Johnson, Colin McKeage, Helene Simard, Yuka Chokyu.

== See also ==
- Canada at the Paralympics
- Canada at the 2000 Summer Olympics

== Bibliography ==
- International Paralympic Committee (2000). "Appendix C: Athlete Numbers - By Delegation". Sydney 2000 Paralympic Games Post Games Report. Sydney.
