= Przybyszewski =

Przybyszewski (feminine Przybyszewska) is a Polish surname. Notable people include:

- Bolesław Przybyszewski (1892–1937), Soviet teacher, musicologist, and head of the Moscow Conservatory
- Dagny Przybyszewska
- John Przybyszewski
- Sebastian Przybyszewski (born 1981), Polish footballer
- Stanisław Przybyszewski (1868–1927), Polish novelist, dramatist, and poet
- Stanisława Przybyszewska (1901–1935), Polish dramatist
- Zbigniew Przybyszewski (1907–1952), Polish military officer and a Commander in the Polish Navy

Fictional characters

- Roland Pryzbylewski, from the HBO drama The Wire

== See also ==
- Przybyszewski Island
