= Wheelchair basketball at the 2000 Summer Paralympics =

Wheelchair basketball at the XI Paralympic Games
- Paralympic Wheelchair Basketball
- Venues: The Dome and Exhibition Complex; Sydney SuperDome
- Competitors: 20 teams from 12 nations

Medalists
1st place, gold medalist(s)		Canada (CAN) (men); Canada (CAN) (women)
2nd place, silver medalist(s)		Netherlands (NED) (men); Australia (AUS) (women)
3rd place, bronze medalist(s)		United States (USA) (men); Japan (JPN) (women)

Paralympic symbol (1994-2004)

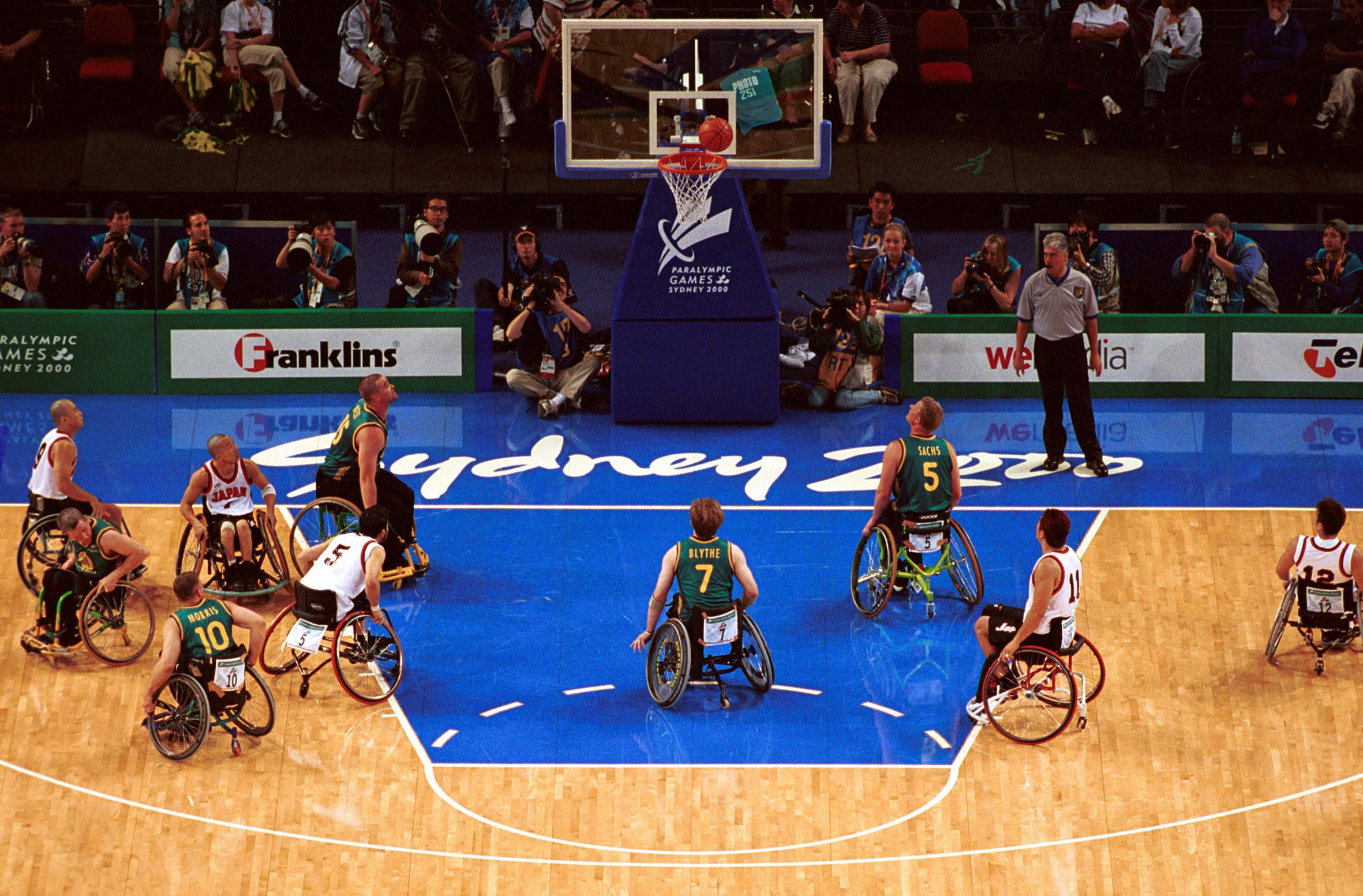
Australian men's wheelchair basketball team vs Japan from above during 2000 Sydney Paralympic Games match

Wheelchair basketball at the 2000 Summer Paralympics consisted of men's and women's team events.

== Medal table ==
Rank	Nation	Gold	Silver	Bronze	Total
1	Canada (CAN)	2	0	0	2
2	Australia (AUS)	0	1	0	1
2	Netherlands (NED)	0	1	0	1
4	Japan (JPN)	0	0	1	1
4	United States (USA)	0	0	1	1
Totals (5 entries)		2	2	2	6

== Medalists ==
Event	Gold	Silver	Bronze
Men's team	Canada (CAN) David Durepos; Richard Peter; Travis Gaertner; Chris Stoutenburg; Patrick Anderson; Jaimie Borisoff; Kenneth Hall; Ross Norton; Joey Johnson; Jeff Dennis; James Treuer; Roy Henderson	Netherlands (NED) Wim 't Lam; Koen Jansens; Rene Martens; Kees van de Bunte; Kornelis van der Werf; Gert Jan van der Linden; Frank de Goede; Arie van Gent; Mustafa Jebari; Anton de Rooy; Ruud Dettmer; Mario Oosterbosch	United States (USA) Paul Schulte; David Paul Kiley; Curtis Bell; Lawrence Johnson; Jeffrey James Glasbrenner; Mike Schlappi; William Henry Waller; William Hernandez; Chuck Gill; Steve Tew; Melvin Sean Juette; Eric Barber
Women's team	Canada (CAN) Sabrina Pettinicchi; Tracey Ferguson; Lori Radke; Linda Kutrowski; Jo Kelly; Michelle Stilwell; Chantal Benoit; Renee del Colle; Marnie Peters; Kendra Ohama; Marni Abbott; Jennifer Krempien	Australia (AUS) Julianne Adams; Jane Webb; Paula Coghlan; Lisa O'Nion; Amanda Carter; Donna Ritchie; Sharon Slann; Liesl Tesch; Nadya Romeo; Karen Farrell; Mellissa Dunn; Alison Mosely	Japan (JPN) Megumi Mashiko; Hiromi Tomori; Naoko Hiromichi; Tomoe Soeda; Sachiko Minamikawa; Rie Kawakami; Mika Takabayashi; Sayuri Horikawa; Junko Sako; Chika Uemura; Kyoko Yashima; Kyoko Tsukamoto

Source: Paralympic.org

== Classification ==
Classification is an important element that will ensure athletes can compete in a fair situation.

A certain committee will give athletes who can take part in this sport an eight-level-score specific to basketball, ranging from 1 to 4.5. Lower scores represent a larger disability. The sum score of all players on the court cannot exceed 14.

== Teams ==
There will be 12 male teams and 8 female teams taking part in this sport.

=== Men's ===
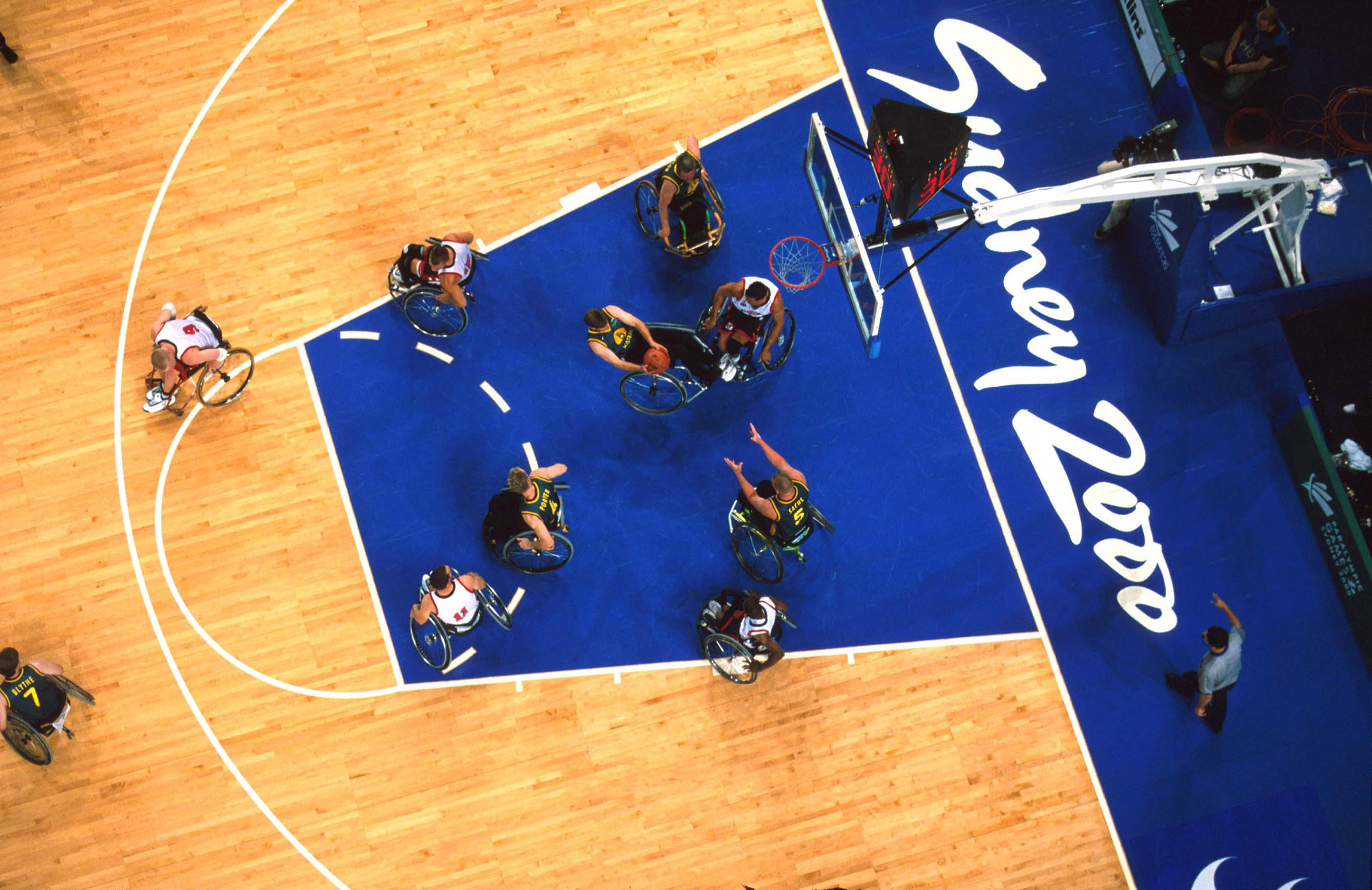
Australian men's wheelchair basketball team from above during 2000 Summer Paralympics match

Team
Canada (CAN)
United States (USA)
Great Britain (GBR)
Germany (GER)
Mexico (MEX)
South Africa (RSA)
Netherlands (NED)
France (FRA)
Australia (AUS)
Sweden (SWE)
Japan (JPN)
South Korea (KOR)

=== Women's ===
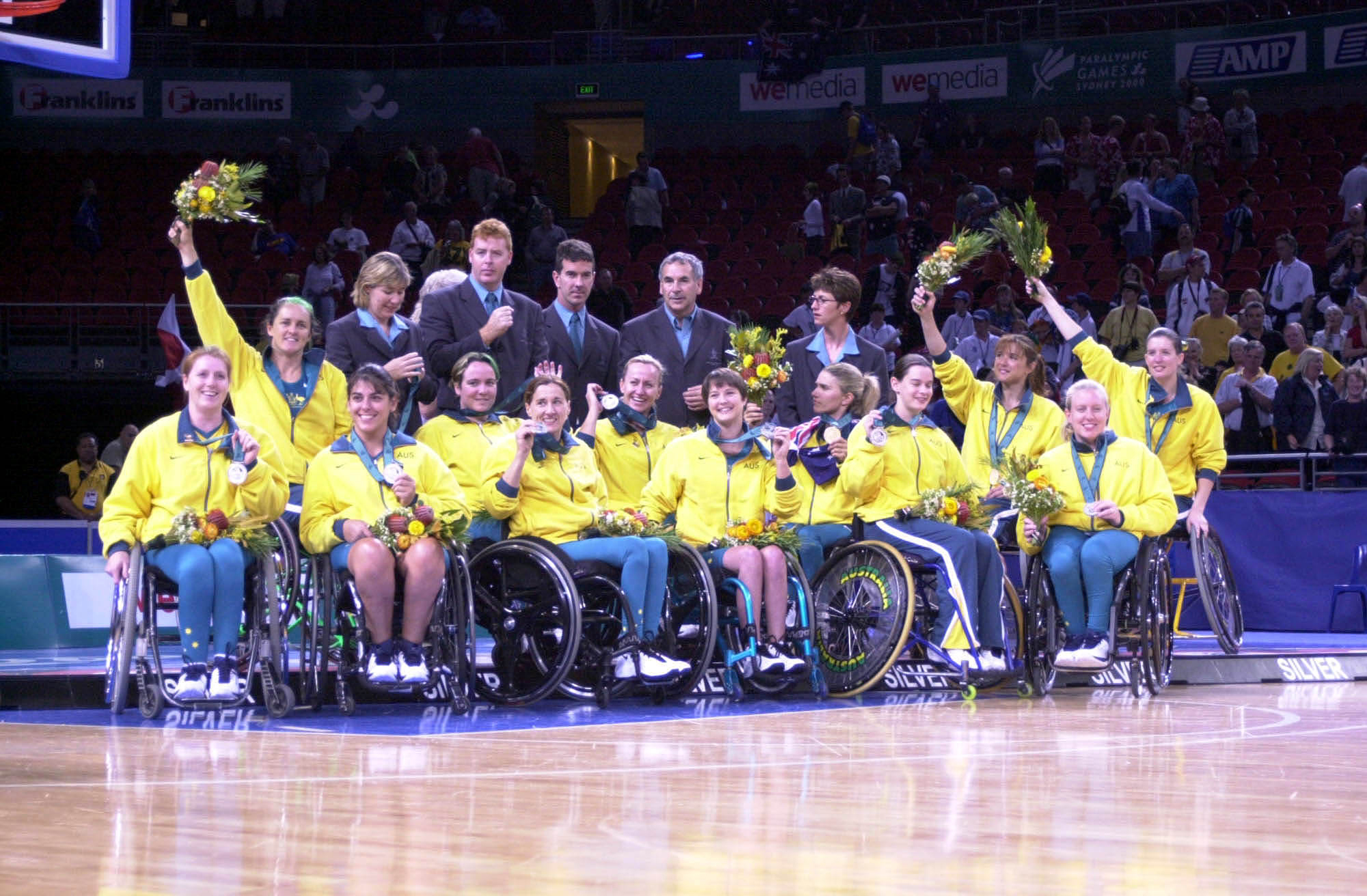
The Australian women's wheelchair basketball team at their silver medal presentation ceremony, 2000 Summer Paralympics

Team
Australia (AUS)
Netherlands (NED)
United States (USA)
Great Britain (GBR)
Canada (CAN)
Japan (JPN)
Mexico (MEX)
Germany (GER)

== Competition format ==
Teams consisted of twelve players, of whom five were on court at any one time. Each player was rated between 0.5 and 4.5 points based on the extent of their disability, with 4.5 representing the least physical limitation. The sum of the rates of all players on court at any time was limited to 14.5 points per team.

Games were played in four periods of ten minutes, with extra time periods of five minutes added as necessary to resolve a tied game.

== See also ==
- Basketball at the 2000 Summer Olympics
