= Slovakia at the 2000 Summer Paralympics =

- IPC code: SVK
- NPC: Slovak Paralympic Committee
- Website: www.spv.sk

in Sydney
- Competitors: 46
- Medals Ranked 36th: Gold 3 Silver 5 Bronze 5 Total 13

Summer Paralympics appearances (overview)
- 1996; 2000; 2004; 2008; 2012; 2016; 2020; 2024

Other related appearances
- Czechoslovakia (1972–1992)

Slovakia competed at the 2000 Summer Paralympics in Sydney, Australia. 46 competitors from Slovakia won 13 medals including 3 gold, 5 silver and 5 bronze to finish 36th in the medal table.

== Medal table ==
| Medal | Name | Sport | Event |
|---|---|---|---|
| Gold | Radovan Kaufman | Cycling | Mixed 1 km time trial LC3 |
| Gold | Pavol Kolackovsky | Swimming | Men's 200m freestyle S14 |
| Gold | Alena Kanova | Table tennis | Women's singles 3 |
| Silver | Anton Sluka | Athletics | Men's marathon T13 |
| Silver | Margita Prokeinová | Swimming | Women's 50m butterfly S7 |
| Silver | Margita Prokeinová | Swimming | Women's 200m individual medley SM7 |
| Silver | Richard Csejtey; Ladislav Gaspar | Table tennis | Men's teams 9 |
| Silver | Viera Kasparova | Table tennis | Women's singles 11 |
| Bronze | Imrich Lyocsa | Archery | Men's individual standing |
| Bronze | Norbert Holik | Athletics | Men's pentathlon P13 |
| Bronze | Jan Szojka; Juraj Petrovic | Cycling | Men's sprint tandem open |
| Bronze | Pavol Kolackovsky | Swimming | Men's 100m freestyle S14 |
| Bronze | Jaroslav Makovník; Peter Nádaský; Peter Meszároš; Pavol Pavlačič; Richard Kováč; Peter Moravčík; Andrej Marcin; Josef Mihalco; Ľubomír Novosád; Juraj Košírel; Marek Tomšík; Pavol Sedlák | Volleyball | Men's standing |

== See also ==
- Slovakia at the Paralympics
- Slovakia at the 2000 Summer Olympics
