= Swimming at the 2000 Summer Paralympics – Women's 200 metre individual medley SM10 =

Women's 200m individual medley SM10 at the XI Paralympic Games
- Paralympic Swimming
- Venue: Sydney International Aquatic Centre
- Dates: 20 October 2000

Medalists
1st place, gold medalist(s)		Jessica Sloan	Canada
2nd place, silver medalist(s)		Gemma Dashwood	Australia
3rd place, bronze medalist(s)		Claudia Hengst	Germany

The women's 200m individual medley SM10 event took place on 20 October 2000 in Sydney, Australia.

== Results ==
=== Final ===
Rank	Athlete	Time	Notes
1st place, gold medalist(s)	Jessica Sloan (CAN)	2:33.64	WR
2nd place, silver medalist(s)	Gemma Dashwood (AUS)	2:41.39	
3rd place, bronze medalist(s)	Claudia Hengst (GER)	2:43.02	
4	Sarah Bailey (GBR)	2:44.43	
5	Kendra Berner (USA)	2:50.06	
6	Anne Polinario (CAN)	2:51.83	
7	Anna Brinck (GER)	2:54.13	
