= Moorea Longstaff =

Canadian para-swimmer

Personal information
- National team: Canada
- Home town: New Westminster, British Columbia
- Education: New Westminster Secondary School
- Years active: 1989–2000

Sport
- Sport: Para-swimming
- Disability: Cerebral palsy
- Disability class: S7
Medal record
Women's Para-swimming
Event	1st	2nd	3rd
Paralympic Games	0	0	1
IPC World Championships	2	0	0
Total	2	0	1
Representing Canada
IPC Swimming World Championships
Gold medal – first place	1998 Christchurch	Women's 4 x 100 metres freestyle open
Gold medal – first place	1998 Christchurch	Women's 400 metres freestyle S7
Paralympic Games
Bronze medal – third place	2000 Sydney	Women's 400 metres freestyle S7

Moorea Longstaff is a Canadian S7 classified para-swimmer. She won two medals as a group in the women's 4 x 100 metres freestyle open competition and individually in the women's 400 metres freestyle S7 event at the IPC Swimming World Championships in Christchurch, New Zealand in 1998. Longstaff went on to claim the bronze medal in the women's 400 metres freestyle S7 competition at the 2000 Summer Paralympics in Sydney, Australia.

== Biography ==
Longstaff comes from New Westminster, British Columbia. She is classified S7 by the International Paralympic Committee because she has cerebral palsy. Longstaff was a member of the Surrey Knights swimming club, and graduated from New Westminster Secondary School in June 2000. She began swimming in 1989, and set a new Canadian record in the women's 200 metres freestyle in the disabled category at the 1995 Superior Propane Cup in Lethbridge, Alberta. That same year, Longstaff was selected to partake in a meet to prepare for the 1996 Summer Paralympics in Atlanta, United States. In the following year, she placed second in the women's 200 metres freestyle disabled category of the 1996 Canada Youth Swimming Championships held in Nepean, Ontario.

In 1997, Longstaff won the silver medal in the 200 metres disabled freestyle event at that year's National Youth Swimming Championships in Regina, Saskatchewan. She went on to finish first in the women's 400 metres freestyle at the same meet in a time of 6 minutes, 23.46 seconds. Longstaff then won the bronze in the women's 100 metres freestyle. She was chosen to represent Canada at the U.S Nationals in Springfield, Massachusetts during mid-July 1997. There, Longstaff won the silver medal in the women's 100 metres freestyle and a bronze in the women's 50-metre S7 competition in the disability category. At the 1997 Canada Summer Games held in Brandon, Manitoba, she took silver in the women's 100 metres breaststroke and the women's 100 freestyle competitions for those with a disability.

When competing at the 1998 Canadian Youth and Disabled Swimming Championships in Sherbrooke, Quebec, Longstaff claimed the silver medal in the women's 200-metre freestyle event, and two gold medals in each of the women's 400-metre freestyle meet in a time of 6 minutes, 0:49 seconds, and the women's 800 metres freestyle competition. Her performances at the competition meant she was within the qualifying standards for the 1998 IPC Swimming World Championships in Christchurch, New Zealand. Longstaff won two gold medals in each of the women's 4 x 100 metres freestyle open alongside Danielle Campo, Anne Polinario and Jessica Sloan and the women's 400-metre freestyle S7 events. She had broken the women's 400-metre freestyle world record by almost six seconds. After that, Longstaff did not complete in swimming events for two weeks following a 13-month period of training at the North Surrey Recreation Centre.

She was nominated for the BC Athlete of the Year in the disabled athlete category in early 1999. At the 1999 Canadian National Championships for Swimmers with a Disability in Victoria, British Columbia, Longstaff won gold medals in each of the women's 200 metres freestyle, the women's 400-metre freestyle, and the women's 800-metre freestyle, breaking the latter world record by four seconds. She qualified for the U.S. National Championships for Swimmers with a Disability as a consequence of her performances in Victoria. Longstaff set a new record in winning the gold medal of the 400 metres freestyle S7 event. She later qualified to compete for Canada at the 2000 Summer Paralympics in Sydney, Australia and partook in the women's 50-metre, 100-metre and 400-metre events. Longstaff was one of 31 athletes coming from British Columbia to participate in the quadrennial event. She won the bronze medal in the women's 400-metre freestyle S7 competition.
