= Athletics at the 2000 Summer Paralympics – Men's 100 metres T34 =

Men's 100 metres T34 at the XI Paralympic Games
- Venue: Stadium Australia
- Competitors: 8 from 5 nations
- Winning time: 16.38

Medalists
1st place, gold medalist(s)		Ross Davis	United States
2nd place, silver medalist(s)		Jason Lachance	Canada
3rd place, bronze medalist(s)		Kazuya Maeba	Japan

The men's 100 metres T34 took place in Stadium Australia.

There were no preliminary rounds; only a final round was held. The T34 is for athletes who have cerebral palsy or similar disabilities and use a wheelchair.

== Final round ==
Rank	Athlete	Time	Notes
1st place, gold medalist(s)	Ross Davis (USA)	16.38	
2nd place, silver medalist(s)	Jason Lachance (CAN)	16.60	
3rd place, bronze medalist(s)	Kazuya Maeba (JPN)	16.70	
4	David Larson (USA)	17.00	
5	Tomonobu Furukawa (JPN)	17.43	
6	Alexis Paez (VEN)	17.52	
7	Dennis van der Schouw (NED)	18.82	
8	Dominique Tremblay (CAN)	20.38	
