= Rowing at the 2008 Summer Paralympics – Mixed double sculls =

Mixed double sculls at the XIII Paralympic Games
- Paralympic Rowing
- Venue: Shunyi Olympic Rowing-Canoeing Park
- Dates: 9–11 September 2008
- Competitors: 12 from 12 nations

Medalists
| 1st place, gold medalist(s) | | Zhou Yangjing; Shan Zilong | China |
| 2nd place, silver medalist(s) | | John MacLean; Kathryn Ross | Australia |
| 3rd place, bronze medalist(s) | | Josiane Lima; Elton Santana | Brazil |

The mixed double sculls rowing competition at the 2008 Summer Paralympics was held from 9 to 11 September at the Shunyi Olympic Rowing-Canoeing Park. The event was competed by Category TA rowers, propelling boats by use of trunk & arms only. Each crew consisted of one man & one woman.

Winners of two heats qualified for the A Final. The remainder rowed in two repechage heats, with the first two in each qualifying for the A Final, the remainder rowing in the B Final.

The event was won by Zhou Yangjing and Shan Zilong, representing China.

== Results ==
=== Heats ===
==== Heat 1 ====
Rowed 9 September at 16:20.

| Rank | Rower | Country | Time |
|---|---|---|---|
| 1 | Zhou Yangjing; Shan Zilong | China | 4:14.67 |
| 2 | John MacLean; Kathryn Ross | Australia | 4:18.66 |
| 3 | Sergii Dereza; Iryna Kyrychenko | Ukraine | 4:27.50 |
| 4 | Angela Madsen; William Brown | United States | 4:29.69 |
| 5 | Harald Wimmer; Siglind Koehler | Germany | 4:44.67 |
| 6 | Caitlin Renneson; Wilfredo More Wilson | Canada | 4:50.54 |

==== Heat 2 ====
Rowed 9 September at 16:40.

| Rank | Rower | Country | Time |
|---|---|---|---|
| 1 | Josiane Lima; Elton Santana | Brazil | 4:18.45 |
| 2 | Daniele Stefanoni; Stefania Toscano | Italy | 4:23.36 |
| 3 | Karen Cromie; James Roberts | Great Britain | 4:25.73 |
| 4 | Piotr Majka; Jolanta Pawlak | Poland | 4:29.14 |
| 5 | Igor Kogan; Mari Kogan | Israel | 4:43.53 |
| 6 | Miho Hamada; Megumi Matsumoto | Japan | 4:52.96 |

=== Repechage ===
==== Heat 1 ====
Rowed 10 September at 16:20.

| Rank | Rower | Country | Time |
|---|---|---|---|
| 1 | John MacLean; Kathryn Ross | Australia | 4:31.24 |
| 2 | Karen Cromie; James Roberts | Great Britain | 4:41.74 |
| 3 | Angela Madsen; William Brown | United States | 4:42.64 |
| 4 | Igor Kogan; Mari Kogan | Israel | 5:03.38 |
| 5 | Caitlin Renneson; Wilfredo More Wilson | Canada | 5:12.47 |

==== Heat 2 ====
Rowed 10 September at 16:40.

| Rank | Rower | Country | Time |
|---|---|---|---|
| 1 | Daniele Stefanoni; Stefania Toscano | Italy | 4:35.24 |
| 2 | Piotr Majka; Jolanta Pawlak | Poland | 4:37.90 |
| 3 | Sergii Dereza; Iryna Kyrychenko | Ukraine | 4:38.90 |
| 4 | Harald Wimmer; Siglind Koehler | Germany | 4:59.69 |
| 5 | Miho Hamada; Megumi Matsumoto | Japan | 5:09.86 |

=== Final Round ===
==== Final B ====
Rowed 11 September at 15:40.

| Rank | Rower | Country | Time |
|---|---|---|---|
| 1 | Angela Madsen; William Brown | United States | 4:30.33 |
| 2 | Sergii Dereza; Iryna Kyrychenko | Ukraine | 4:37.78 |
| 3 | Harald Wimmer; Siglind Koehler | Germany | 4:49.05 |
| 4 | Igor Kogan; Mari Kogan | Israel | 4:50.43 |
| 5 | Caitlin Renneson; Wilfredo More Wilson | Canada | 4:54.08 |
| 6 | Miho Hamada; Megumi Matsumoto | Japan | 5:01.30 |

==== Final A ====
Rowed 11 September at 17:00.

| Rank | Rower | Country | Time |
|---|---|---|---|
| 1st place, gold medalist(s) | Zhou Yangjing; Shan Zilong | China | 4:20.69 |
| 2nd place, silver medalist(s) | John MacLean; Kathryn Ross | Australia | 4:21.58 |
| 3rd place, bronze medalist(s) | Josiane Lima; Elton Santana | Brazil | 4:28.36 |
| 4 | Daniele Stefanoni; Stefania Toscano | Italy | 4:32.30 |
| 5 | Karen Cromie; James Roberts | Great Britain | 4:32.52 |
| 6 | Piotr Majka; Jolanta Pawlak | Poland | 4:35.08 |
