= Lawrence Flynn =

Lawrence Flynn may refer to:

- Lawrence Flynn (volleyball), Canadian standing volleyball player
- Lawrence P. Flynn (1931–2017), officer in the US military

== See also ==
- Larry Flynn (1930–2007), American NASCAR race car driver
