= Jeff Hammond =

Jeff(rey) or Geoff(rey) Hammond may refer to:

- Jeff Hammond (actor) (born 1980), Canadian actor and director
- Jeff Hammond (cricketer) (born 1950), Australian cricketer
- Jeff Hammond (NASCAR) (born 1956), American sportscaster and crew chief
- Jeffrey Hammond (born 1946), English musician
- Geoff Hammond (footballer) (born 1950), English footballer
- Geoff Hammond (volleyball), Canadian standing volleyball player
- Geoffrey Hammond (tennis) in 1946 Australian Championships – Men's Singles

== See also ==
- Jeffery Hammond (born 1959), retired United States Army general
- Jeffrey Hammonds (born 1971), American baseball player
