= Wheelchair basketball at the 1996 Summer Paralympics =

Wheelchair basketball at the X Paralympic Games
- Paralympic Wheelchair Basketball

Medalists
| 1st place, gold medalist(s) | | Australia (AUS) (men); Canada (CAN) (women) |
| 2nd place, silver medalist(s) | | Great Britain (GBR) (men); Netherlands (NED) (women) |
| 3rd place, bronze medalist(s) | | United States (USA) (men); United States (USA) (women) |

Paralympic symbol (1994-2004)

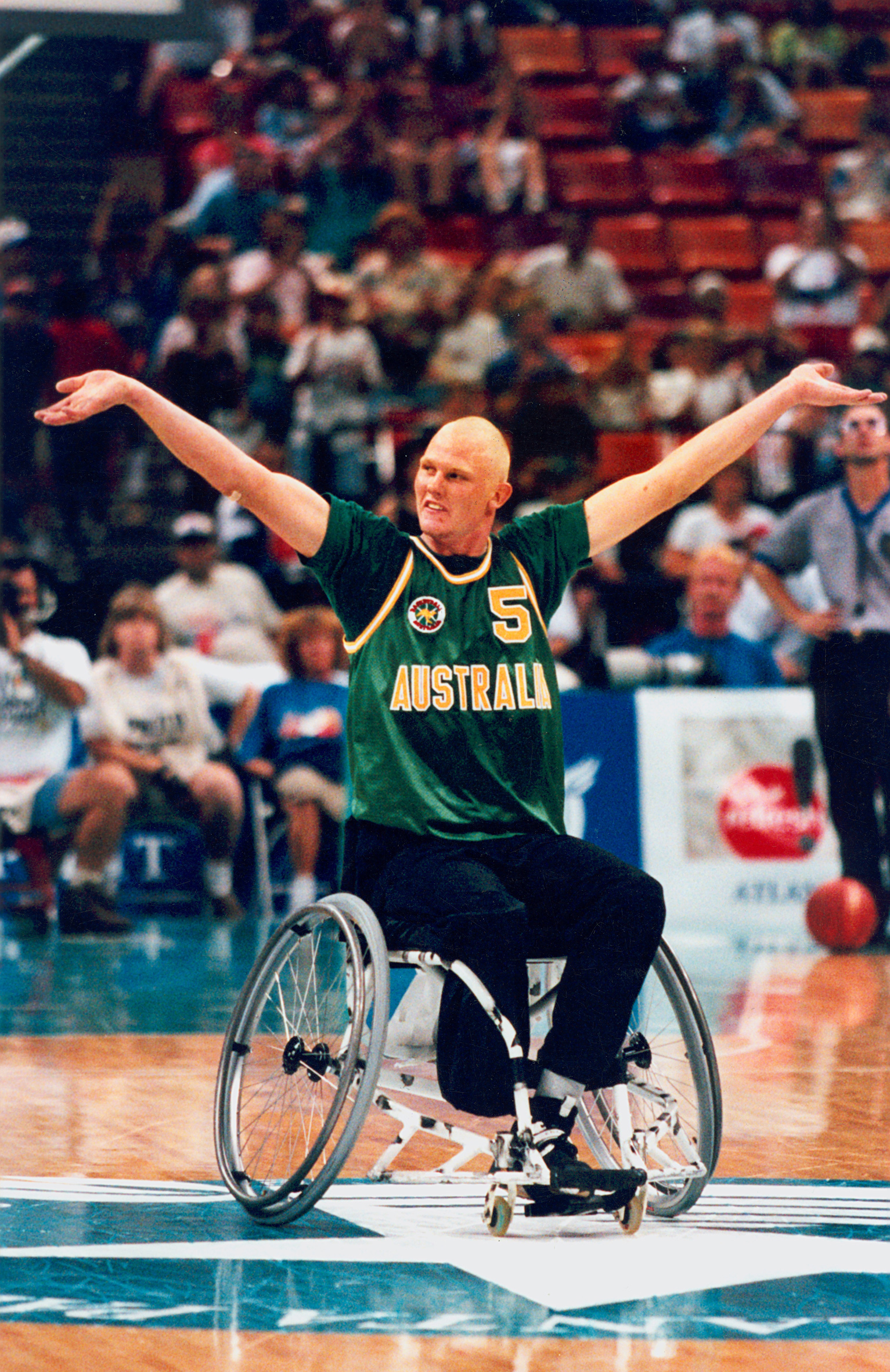
Australian gold medallist men's wheelchair basketballer Troy Sachs encourages the crowd at the 1996 Summer Paralympics.

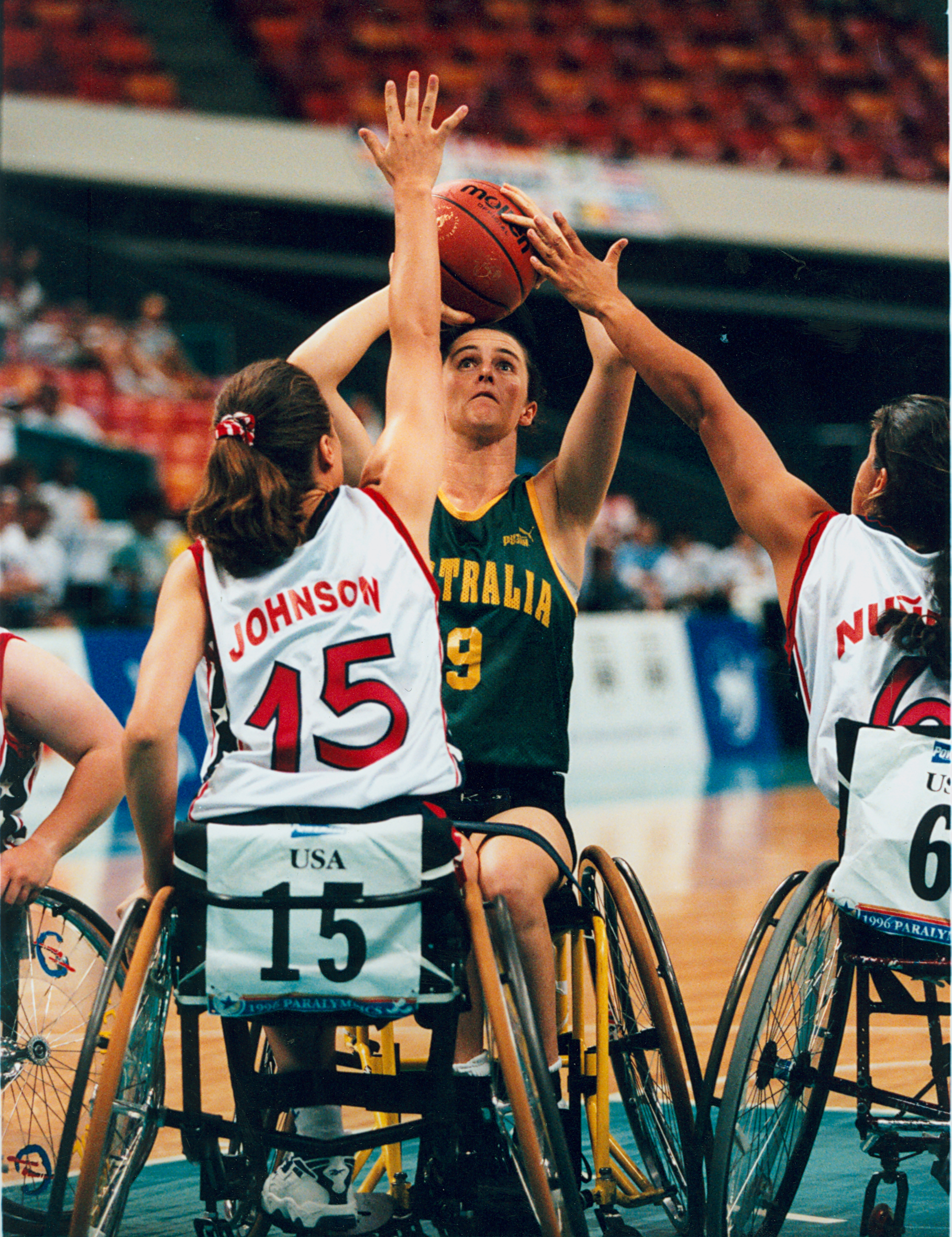
American women's team defending against Australia's Liesl Tesch

Wheelchair basketball at the 1996 Summer Paralympics consisted of men's and women's team events.

== Medal summary ==
| Event | Gold | Silver | Bronze |
|---|---|---|---|
| Men's team | Australia (AUS) Gerry Hewson; Stuart Ewin; David Selby; Timothy Maloney; Orfeo Cecconato; Nick Morris; Troy Andrews; Benjamin Cox; Robert "Sandy" Blythe; David Gould; Troy Sachs; Richard Oliver | Great Britain (GBR) Daniel Johnson; Malcolm Tarkenter; Joseph Jayaratne; Colin Price; David Bramley; Nigel Smith; Calum Gordon; Simon Munn; Mark Cheaney; Garry Peel; Anthony Woollard; Steven Caine | United States (USA) Craig Shewmake; Mike Schlappi; Roberto Knight; Trooper Johnson; Darryl Waller; Reginald Colton; James Miller; Timothy Kazee; Chuck Gill; Mark Shepherd; Melvin Sean Juette; Randy Snow |
| Women's team | Canada (CAN) Marni Abbott; Linda Kutrowski; Lori Radke; Tracey Ferguson; Sabrina Pettinicchi; Marney Smithies; Chantal Benoit; Renee del Colle; Lisa Stevens; Kendra Ohama; Jennifer Krempien; Kelly Krywa | Netherlands (NED) Asjoesja Ibrahimi; Ingeborg Tiggelman; Guda van der Laan; Jozima Mosely; Marja van Leeuwen; Jorien Buurman; Jeanine van Veggel; Erna Benneker; Evelina van Leeuwen; Jaapje de Zeeuw; Jennette Jansen; Yolanda Broerse | United States (USA) Tiana Tozer; Jana Stump; Josie Johnson; Jamie Danskin; Ruth Nunez; Sharon Herbst; Pamela Fontaine; Kimberly Martin; Renee Tyree-Gross; Susan Hagel; Ronda Jarvis; Margaret Stran |

Source: Paralympic.org

== See also ==
- Basketball at the 1996 Summer Olympics
