= Athletics at the 1996 Summer Paralympics – Men's marathon T12 =

Men's marathon T12 at the X Paralympic Games
- Paralympic Athletics
- Dates: 25 August
- Competitors: 10 from 9 nations

Medalists
1st place, gold medalist(s)		Anton Sluka	Slovakia
2nd place, silver medalist(s)		Mark Farnell	Great Britain
3rd place, bronze medalist(s)		João Onofre da Costa	Portugal

The Men's marathon T12 was a marathon event in athletics at the 1996 Summer Paralympics, for visually impaired athletes. The defending champion from the 1992 Paralympics, Mark Farnell, and silver medalist Anton Sluka, returned for this year's marathon. Farnell failed to defend his title, and took silver, finishing 13 seconds behind Sluka, who was now representing Slovakia in its first games as an independent country. Of the ten starters, nine reached the finish line.

== Results ==
Place	Athlete	Time
1	Anton Sluka (SVK)	2:39:23
2	Mark Farnell (GBR)	2:52:46
3	João Onofre da Costa (POR)	2:54:04
4	Nikolai Tchoumak (MDA)	2:55:04
5	Michael Castle (USA)	2:56:15
6	Lynn Michael Wachtell (USA)	3:01:51
7	Ildar Pomykalov (RUS)	3:06:42
8	Michael Clarke (IRL)	3:11:29
9	John Lodomo (KEN)	3:18:13
-	Diosmani Gonzalez (CUB)	dnf

== See also ==
- Marathon at the Paralympics
