= James Roberts (British athlete) =

Belgian-born British sportsperson

James Roberts MBE

Personal information
- Full name: James Penry Roberts
- Nationality: Great Britain
- Born: 11 May 1986 (age 40)

Volleyball information
- Position: UN
- Number: 11

Career
Years	Teams
2012	FDSW Celtic Dragons

National team
2012	(United Kingdom) Great Britain sitting volleyball team
Honours
Representing Great Britain
Paralympic Games
Wheelchair rugby
Gold medal – first place	2020 Tokyo	Wheelchair Rugby

James Roberts (born 11 May 1986 in Mons, Belgium) is a wheelchair basketball player and Paralympic athlete based in Prestatyn, Denbighshire, Wales. Roberts was born with a disability called femoral dysplasia. He started out in his sporting career as a swimmer, and progressed on to other Paralympic sports, such as rowing and sitting volleyball. He competed for Great Britain at the 2008 Beijing Paralympics, finishing fifth in the trunk and arm classification in adaptive rowing. He also competed for Great Britain at the 2012 Summer Paralympics in London, finishing 8th in the sitting volleyball. More recently he has begun playing wheelchair basketball for local side Rhyl Raptors.

== Early years and education ==
Roberts was born on 11 May 1986 in Mons, Belgium. He attended the SHAPE American High School and graduated in 2005. After taking up his place at Swansea University to pursue a Bachelor of Science in sport and exercise science, he graduated with a second-class honours degree in summer 2010. In September 2011 Roberts embarked on postgraduate studies in sociology of sport and exercise at the University of Chester, subsequently graduating with a Postgraduate Certificate.

== Tokyo Paralympics ==
In 2021, Roberts was part of the Great Britain team that took wheelchair rugby gold at the 2020 Tokyo Paralympics. He was subsequently appointed Member of the Order of the British Empire (MBE) in the 2022 New Year Honours for services to wheelchair rugby.
