= Bosnia and Herzegovina at the 2000 Summer Paralympics =

- IPC code: BIH
- NPC: Paralympic Committee of Bosnia and Herzegovina
- Website: www.pkbih.com

in Sydney
- Competitors: 13 in 1 sport
- Medals Ranked 60th: Gold 0 Silver 1 Bronze 0 Total 1

Summer Paralympics appearances (overview)
- 1996; 2000; 2004; 2008; 2012; 2016; 2020; 2024

Other related appearances
- Yugoslavia (1972–2000)

There were 0 female and 13 male athletes representing the country at the 2000 Summer Paralympics.

== Medallists ==
Medal	Name	Sport	Event
Silver	Dževad Hamzić; Nedžad Salkić; Abid Čišija; Sabahudin Delalić; Nevzet Alić; Zikret Mahmić; Fikret Čausević; Asim Medić; Edin Ibraković; Ševko Nuhanović; Adnan Manko; Ismet Godinjak	Volleyball	Men's sitting

== See also ==
- Bosnia and Herzegovina at the 2000 Summer Olympics
- Bosnia and Herzegovina at the Paralympics

== Bibliography ==
- International Paralympic Committee (2000). "Appendix C: Athlete Numbers - By Delegation". Sydney 2000 Paralympic Games Post Games Report. Sydney.
