= Larry Matthews =

Canadian Paralympic volleyball player (born 1969)

Personal information
- Born: 25 April 1969 (age 57)
Medal record
Men's volleyball
Representing Canada
Paralympic Games
Silver medal – second place	2000 Sydney	Volleyball - standing
Parapan American Games
Bronze medal – third place	2011 Guadalajara	Volleyball - sitting
Bronze medal – third place	2015 Toronto	Volleyball - sitting

Larry Matthews (born 25 April 1969) competed for Canada in the men's standing volleyball event at the 2000 Summer Paralympics, where he won a silver medal. He also competed with the Canadian teams which won bronze medals in sitting volleyball at the 2011 Parapan American Games and 2015 Parapan American Games.

== See also ==
- Canada at the 2000 Summer Paralympics
- Canada at the 2011 Parapan American Games
- Canada at the 2015 Parapan American Games
