= Timo Hager =

German Paralympic volleyball player

Medal record
Men's volleyball
Representing Germany
Paralympic Games
Gold medal – first place	2000 Sydney	Volleyball - standing

Timo Hager competed for Germany in the men's standing volleyball event at the 2000 Summer Paralympics, where he won a gold medal.

== See also ==
- Germany at the 2000 Summer Paralympics
