= Neil Johnson (volleyball) =

Canadian Paralympic volleyball player

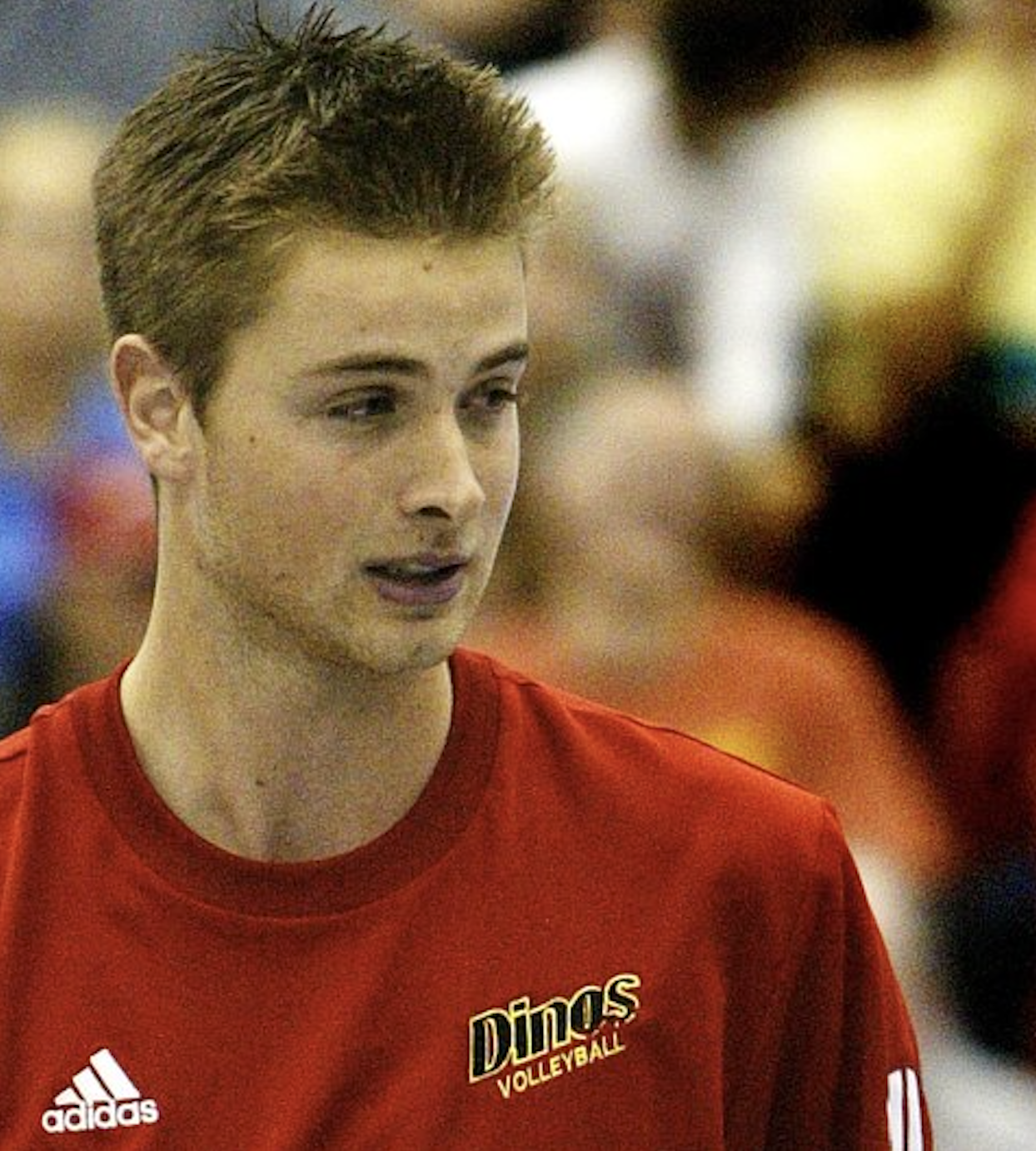
- Johnson in 2003
Medal record
Men's volleyball
Representing Canada
Paralympic Games
Silver medal – second place	2000 Sydney	Volleyball – standing
World Championships
Gold medal – first place	2002 Poland	Volleyball – standing
Gold medal – first place	2004 Germany	Volleyball – standing
Gold medal – first place	2006 Netherlands	Volleyball – standing

Neil Johnson is a Canadian former volleyball player who competed for Canada in the men's standing volleyball event at the 2000 Summer Paralympics, where he won a silver medal. He was then the captain of Team Canada for three consecutive World Championship gold medals in 2002, 2004 and 2006. In 2003, he and his 2000 and 2002 teammates were inducted into the Volleyball Canada Hall of Fame.

Born missing his left arm below the elbow, he was one of the few disabled players to complete at the highest levels of able-bodied volleyball. He played for the varsity teams at Mount Royal University and the University of Calgary, and he began playing professionally in Bonn, Germany, in 2004.

== See also ==
- Canada at the 2000 Summer Paralympics
