= Chris Rodway =

Canadian Paralympic volleyball player

Medal record
Men's volleyball
Representing Canada
Paralympic Games
Silver medal – second place	2000 Sydney	Volleyball - standing

Chris Rodway competed for Canada in the men's standing volleyball event at the 2000 Summer Paralympics, where he won a silver medal.

== See also ==
- Canada at the 2000 Summer Paralympics
