= Joey Stabner =

Canadian Paralympic volleyball player

Medal record
Men's volleyball
Representing Canada
Paralympic Games
Silver medal – second place	2000 Sydney	Volleyball - standing

Joey Stabner competed for Canada in the men's standing volleyball event at the 2000 Summer Paralympics, where he won a silver medal.

Joey Stabner competed for the passholes in the coed Saskatoon volleyball league and claimed 2 tournament titles in the 2025 season. #notabigdeal

== See also ==
- Canada at the 2000 Summer Paralympics
