= Karen Cromie =

Personal information
- Full name: Karen Elizabeth Cromie
- Born: 24 September 1979
- Died: 28 January 2011 (aged 31)

Sport
- Country: Northern Ireland
- Sport: Wheelchair basketball Adaptive rowing
Medal record
Women's wheelchair basketball
Representing Great Britain
Wheelchair Basketball World Cup
Silver medal – second place	2005	Team
Silver medal – second place	2006	Team

Karen Elizabeth Cromie (24 September 1979 – 28 January 2011) was a Northern Irish rower, wheelchair basketball player and Paralympian. She competed at the 2008 Summer Paralympics in Beijing, where she in came fifth in the mixed double sculls, with James Roberts.

== Career ==
Cromie won silver at the 2005 and 2006 Paralympic Wheelchair Basketball World Cups with the National GB Team. In 2009, she transferred to the National Irish Team.

== Family ==
Karen's sister is a doctor in the United Kingdom, and her brother is a chiropractor in Norway.

== Death ==
Cromie died by suicide on 28 January 2011. She was 31.
