= Kazuya Maeba =

Japanese Paralympic athlete

Medal record

Paralympic athletics

Representing Japan

Paralympic Games
Gold medal – first place	2000 Sydney	400 metres - T34
Silver medal – second place	2000 Sydney	200 metres - T34
Bronze medal – third place	2000 Sydney	100 metres - T34

Kazuya Maeba (前場 一也, Maeba Kazuya) is a paralympic athlete from Japan competing mainly in category T34 sprint events.

Kazuya first competed in the 1996 Summer Paralympics in the 400m. In the 2000 Summer Paralympics he won three medals, a gold in 400m, silver in the 200m and bronze in the 100m.
