= Mikael Bartholdy =

Canadian Paralympic volleyball player (born 1982)

Medal record
Men's volleyball
Representing Canada
Paralympic Games
Silver medal – second place	2000 Sydney	Volleyball - standing
Parapan American Games
Bronze medal – third place	2011 Guadalajara	Volleyball - sitting
Bronze medal – third place	2019 Lima	Volleyball - sitting

Mikael Bartholdy (born February 24, 1982) competed for Canada in the men's standing volleyball event at the 2000 Summer Paralympics, where he won a silver medal. He also competed with the Canadian team which won a bronze medal in sitting volleyball at the 2011 Parapan American Games and the 2019 Parapan American Games.

== See also ==
- Canada at the 2000 Summer Paralympics
- Canada at the 2011 Parapan American Games
- Canada at the 2019 Parapan American Games
