= Angela Madsen =

American Paralympic athlete (1960–2020)

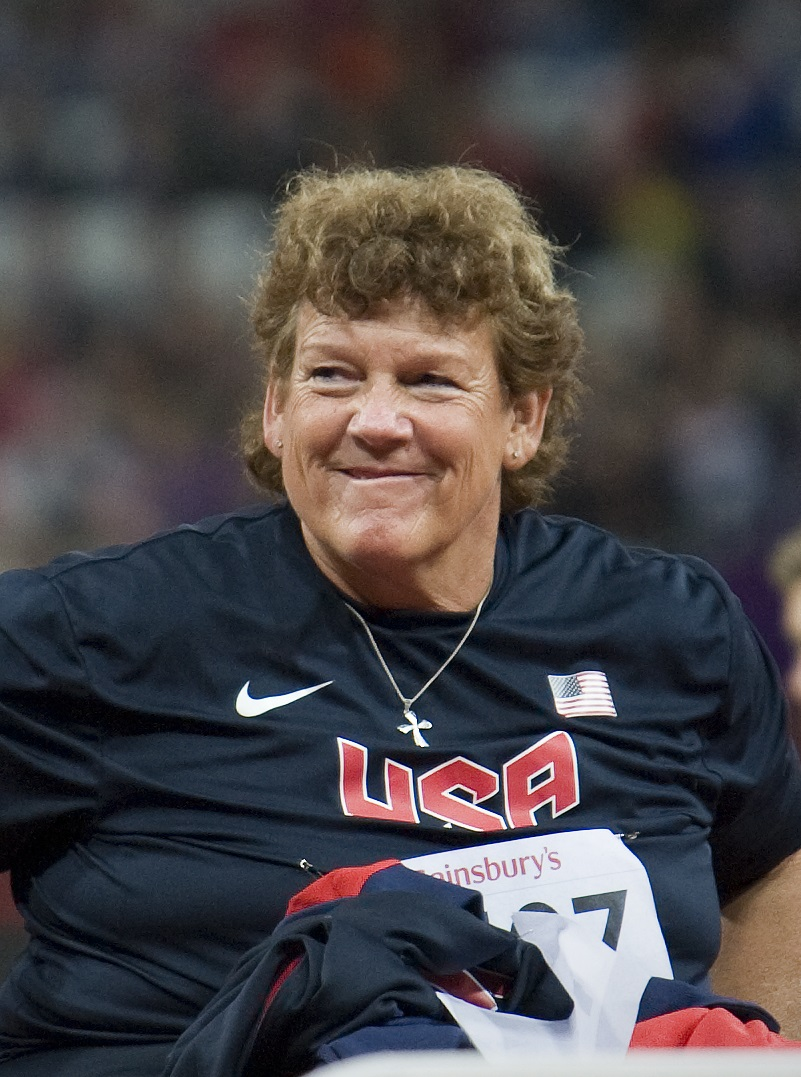
- Madsen at the 2012 Paralympic Games in London

Personal information
- Born: May 10, 1960 Xenia, Ohio, U.S.
- Died: June 21, 2020 (aged 60) Pacific Ocean
- Height: 6 ft 1 in (1.85 m)

Sport
- Country: United States
- Sport: Athletics
- Disability: Paraplegia
- Disability class: TA (rowing); F56 (athletics)
- Event(s): shot put, javelin throw
Medal record
Representing United States
Para athletics
Paralympic Games
Bronze medal – third place	2012 London	Shot put F54–56
Parapan American Games
Gold medal – first place	2015 Toronto	Javelin throw F55/56
Silver medal – second place	2011 Guadalajara	Shot put F54/55/56
Silver medal – second place	2015 Toronto	Shot put F56/57
Para rowing
World Rowing Championships
Gold medal – first place	2003 Milan	Double sculls – TA
Gold medal – first place	2004 Banyoles	Double sculls – TA
Gold medal – first place	2005 Kaizu	Double sculls – TA
Silver medal – second place	2002 Seville	Single sculls – TA

Angela Madsen (May 10, 1960 – June 21, 2020) was an American Paralympian sportswoman in both rowing and track and field. In a long career, Madsen moved from race rowing to ocean challenges before switching in 2011 to athletics, winning a bronze medal in the shot put at the 2012 Summer Paralympics in London. Madsen and teammate Helen Taylor were the first women to row across the Indian Ocean. She died in June 2020 while attempting a solo row from Los Angeles to Honolulu.

== Early life and education ==
Madsen was born in Xenia, Ohio, on May 10, 1960. Educated at Fairborn Baker High School in Fairborn, Ohio, she became a single parent at the age of seventeen, which impeded her chance for an athletics scholarship.

== Military career ==
Most of Madsen's immediate family were military, so when her brothers told her she "couldn't make it as a Marine", it made her determined to join. She enlisted in the Marines, leaving her daughter with her parents until she completed boot camp. After completing her training, the Marine Corps provided Madsen with a home for her and her daughter. She was sent to Fort McClellan, Alabama to train as a military police officer. Her first duty station was at Marine Corps Air Station El Toro, near Irvine, California. At El Toro, she joined the women's basketball team, at center, and when the team competed at the Marine Corps West Coast Regional Basketball Tournament, Madsen was scouted by the women's Marine Corps team.

=== Spinal injury and surgery ===
In 1980, at her first Marine Corps basketball training session, she fell on the court and another player stepped on her back, rupturing two discs in her spine. This led to Madsen suffering from chronic back pain and sciatica. With therapy, she slowly recovered. She found work as a mechanic in the Sears automotive department and later at U-Haul. But she could not keep up such physically demanding work and took a desk job as a mechanical engineer. Then in 1992 she broke a leg and some ribs in a car accident. Already suffering from spinal degeneration from the basketball injury, she had corrective surgery the next year, which left her with both legs paralyzed.

The Marine Corps refused to pay Madsen's medical bills following the car accident, and Madsen lost her home while her marriage fell apart. She had depression and became homeless, sometimes sleeping in her wheelchair in front of Disneyland.

== Paralympic career ==
Madsen's life turned around when, after attending a National Veterans Games, she was introduced to wheelchair basketball. She became active in the sport and began rebuilding her life. The defining point in her recovery came after she fell onto subway tracks in San Francisco and feared she had broken her neck. The accident made her reassess her life as a disabled person, and she decided to live it to the fullest. She wrote an autobiography, Rowing Against the Wind, published in 2014.

=== Rowing career ===
Madsen was introduced to rowing when her wheelchair basketball sponsor invited her to a learn-to-row event in Dana Point. She found she was a natural at the sport and liked that she did not need to use a wheelchair to participate. In 2002, the International Rowing Federation added adaptive rowing to the World Rowing Championships, and Madsen, classified as a trunk-and-arms (TA) competitor, was selected to race at the 2002 World Rowing Championships. She finished in silver place in the single sculls. In the next three years she entered each of the World Championships, winning the gold medal in the doubles sculls in every tournament.

While a competitive rower, Madsen was also enjoying ocean-rowing events, and from her home in California she had access to the Pacific. She began rowing between Newport, California, and Dana Point, and began entering 20-mile races. After Madsen met Louisville Adaptive Rowing Program volunteer Tori Murden, who was the first American to row the Atlantic solo, she became inspired to undertake an ocean journey. Over the following years Madsen took on multiple ocean treks. In 2007, she became the first woman with a disability to row across the Atlantic Ocean. Two years later she became, along with Helen Taylor, one of the first two women to row across the Indian Ocean. Madsen was also part of a team that circumnavigated Great Britain.

In 2008, Madsen represented the United States at her first Summer Paralympics, competing at the 2008 Games in Beijing in the mixed double sculls with William Brown, though they did not progress through the repechage and finished seventh.

=== Athletics career ===
Madsen made her first appearance for the United States as a F56 track-and-field athlete in 2011. Her results leading up to the games qualified her for the 2012 Summer Paralympics in London, competing in the shot put (F54–56) and javelin throw (F54/55/56). She finished fifth in the javelin, but a throw of 8.88 metres was enough to win her a bronze medal in the shot put. She also competed for the United States at the 2015 IPC Athletics World Championships in Doha, and in 2016, at the Boiling Point Track Classic at the University of Windsor in Canada, Madsen won her shot put event with a distance of 9.43, setting a new world record. Also in July 2016 Madsen was announced as a member of the US team to compete at Rio in the 2016 Summer Paralympics, where she finished eighth in the women's shot put F56/57, and seventh in the women's javelin throw F55/F56.

In November 2014, Madsen received the Athletes in Excellence Award from The Foundation for Global Sports Development in recognition of her community service efforts and work with youth.

She held six Guinness World Records and was working toward another (as the oldest woman and first paraplegic to row across the Pacific alone) at the time of her death.

== Personal life ==
Madsen came out as gay in 1981, while in the US military. She met her wife, Debra, in 2006. In 2015 she was a grand marshal for the Long Beach Pride Parade. Madsen resided in Long Beach, California.

She was found dead nearly halfway into her solo row from Los Angeles to Honolulu on June 22, 2020. The journey was being filmed by Soraya Simi.
