= Marek Tomšík =

Slovak Paralympic volleyball player

Personal information
- Born: 1975 or 1976 (age 50–51)
Medal record
Men's volleyball
Representing Slovakia
Paralympic Games
Silver medal – second place	1996 Atlanta	Volleyball - standing
Bronze medal – third place	2000 Sydney	Volleyball - standing

Marek Tomšík (born 1975) competed for Slovakia in the men's standing volleyball event at the 1996 Summer Paralympics (silver medal) and the 2000 Summer Paralympics (bronze medal).

== See also ==
- Slovakia at the 1996 Summer Paralympics
- Slovakia at the 2000 Summer Paralympics
