= Jaroslav Makovník =

Slovak Paralympic volleyball player

Medal record
Men's volleyball
Representing Slovakia
Paralympic Games
Silver medal – second place	1996 Atlanta	Volleyball - standing
Bronze medal – third place	2000 Sydney	Volleyball - standing

Jaroslav Makovník competed for Slovakia in the men's standing volleyball event at the 1996 Summer Paralympics (silver medal) and the 2000 Summer Paralympics (bronze medal).

== See also ==
- Slovakia at the 1996 Summer Paralympics
- Slovakia at the 2000 Summer Paralympics
