= Carrie Anton =

Canadian goalball player

Personal information
- Born: 8 October 1969 (age 56) Regina, Saskatchewan, Canada

Sport
- Country: Canada
- Sport: Goalball
Medal record
Goalball
Representing Canada
Paralympic Games
Gold medal – first place	2000 Sydney	Women's tournament
World Goalball Championships
Silver medal – second place	2002	Women's tournament

Carrie Anton (born 8 October 1969) is a retired Canadian goalball player who competed in international level events. She is a national goalball coach in Edmonton.
