= Mathieu Blanchette =

Canadian Paralympic athlete

Medal record

Paralympic athletics

Representing Canada

Paralympic Games
Bronze medal – third place	2000 Sydney	4x100 metre relay - T54

Mathieu Blanchette (born October 20, 1976, in Quebec City, Quebec) is a Canadian paralympic athlete competing mainly in category T54 long-distance events.

Although Blanchette is a long distance racer and competed in the 2000 Summer Paralympics in the 5000m and 10000m, his only medal, a bronze, came as part of the Canadian 4 × 100 m relay in the same games.
