= Wheelchair basketball at the 2000 Summer Paralympics – Women's tournament =

Wheelchair basketball – Women at the XI Paralympic Games
- Paralympic Wheelchair Basketball
- Venue: The Dome and Exhibition Complex
- Dates: 2000

Medalists
| 1st place, gold medalist(s) | | Canada (CAN) |
| 2nd place, silver medalist(s) | | Australia (AUS) |
| 3rd place, bronze medalist(s) | | Japan (JPN) |

The women's tournament was won by the team representing Canada.

== Preliminary round ==
Group A
| Rank | Team | Pld | W | L | PF:PA | Pts | AUS | NED | USA | GBR |
|---|---|---|---|---|---|---|---|---|---|---|
| 1 | Australia | 3 | 3 | 0 | 125:74 | 6 | x | 38:26 | 44:36 | 43:12 |
| 2 | Netherlands | 3 | 2 | 1 | 105:85 | 5 | 26:38 | x | 45:26 | 34:21 |
| 3 | United States | 3 | 1 | 2 | 120:119 | 4 | 36:44 | 26:45 | x | 58:30 |
| 4 | Great Britain | 3 | 0 | 3 | 63:135 | 3 | 12:43 | 21:34 | 30:58 | x |

Group B
| Rank | Team | Pld | W | L | PF:PA | Pts | CAN | JPN | MEX | GER |
|---|---|---|---|---|---|---|---|---|---|---|
| 1 | Canada | 3 | 3 | 0 | 145:86 | 6 | x | 49:32 | 60:28 | 36:26 |
| 2 | Japan | 3 | 2 | 1 | 151:142 | 5 | 32:49 | x | 57:41 | 62:52 |
| 3 | Mexico | 3 | 1 | 2 | 114:161 | 4 | 28:60 | 41:57 | x | 45:44 |
| 4 | Germany | 3 | 0 | 3 | 122:143 | 3 | 26:36 | 52:62 | 44:45 | x |

Qualified for quarterfinals

Source: Paralympic.org

== Medal Round ==
Semifinals
Australia | 45
Japan | 33
Canada | 42
Netherlands | 23

Final
Australia | 27
Canada | 46
Third place
Japan | 48
Netherlands | 25

Source: Paralympic.org

== Classification 5-8 ==
Classification round
United States | 50
Germany | 30
Mexico | 41
Great Britain | 37

Fifth place
United States | 64
Mexico | 21
Seventh place
Germany | 43
Great Britain | 32

Source: Paralympic.org

== Ranking ==
| Place | Team |
|---|---|
| 1st place, gold medalist(s) | Canada |
| 2nd place, silver medalist(s) | Australia |
| 3rd place, bronze medalist(s) | Japan |
| 4. | Netherlands |
| 5. | United States |
| 6. | Mexico |
| 7. | Germany |
| 8. | Great Britain |
