= Jason Lachance =

Medal record

Paralympic athletics

Representing Canada

Paralympic Games
Gold medal – first place	2000 Sydney	200 metres - T34
Silver medal – second place	2000 Sydney	100 metres - T34
Silver medal – second place	2000 Sydney	400 metres - T34

Jason Lachance is a paralympic wheelchair racer from Canada competing mainly in sprint events.

Lachance has competed in three Paralympic Games. His first was in 1996 where he competed in the T34 100m & 400m. His great success came in the 2000 Summer Paralympics where he won silver in the 100m, gold in the 200m and a second silver in the 400m all in the T34 class. In 2004 he was competing in combined T53/T34 events and ended the games without a medal.

Lachance stopped competing in 2007 after a serious accident. After years of hydrotherapy and rehab, he got back on the track in 2014. Due to limited mobility as a result of his injury, Lachance is now a T33 classified athlete. He is a past world record holder in the 100m, 200m & 400m sprint events. T34 classified athletes
