= Juraj Košírel =

Slovak Paralympic volleyball player

Personal information
- Born: 1980 or 1981 (age 45–46)
Medal record
Men's volleyball
Representing Slovakia
Paralympic Games
Bronze medal – third place	2000 Sydney	Volleyball - standing

Juraj Košírel (born 1980 or 1981) competed for Slovakia in the men's standing volleyball event at the 2000 Summer Paralympics, winning a bronze medal.

== See also ==
- Slovakia at the 2000 Summer Paralympics
