= Dave Durepos =

Canadian wheelchair basketball player

Medal record

Men's wheelchair basketball

Representing Canada

Paralympic Games
Gold medal – first place	2000 Sydney	Men's team
Gold medal – first place	2004 Athens	Men's team
Silver medal – second place	2008 Beijing	Men's team
Gold medal – first place	2012 London	Men's team

David "Dave" Durepos (born July 14, 1968) is a Canadian retired wheelchair basketball player. He is married to fellow Paralympian Sabrina Pettinicchi. As a member of Team Canada, Durepos competed in five Paralympic Games where he won 3 gold medals along with one silver. On September 25, 2012, the City of Fredericton proclaimed that date to be Dave Durepos Day.

== Early life ==
Durepos was born on July 14, 1968, in Fredericton, New Brunswick. He attended and graduated from the New Brunswick Community College in 1984 with a degree in Steel Fabrication. After suffering from a spinal cord injury due to a motorcycle crash in 1988, he lost the use of his legs.

== Career ==
Durepos joined Canada men's national wheelchair basketball team in 1994. He served as Captain for Team Canada in the 2000 Summer Paralympics where they won their first Paralympic gold medal. As a result, Durepos became the first New Brunswick player to bring home an Olympic or Paralympic gold medal.

In the following years, he joined the National Wheelchair Basketball Association where he led the Milwaukee Bucks to a Final Four Championship title in 2002 and became the first Canadian to be named MVP in Division I of the National Wheelchair Basketball Association. He also received Queen Elizabeth II's Golden Jubilee Medal. In 2004, Durepos was selected to compete at the 2004 Summer Paralympics in Athens. While still a member of the Canada National Team, Durepos was named MVP back-to-back at the Canadian National Championships in 2006 and 2007. Before retiring, Durepos helped lead Canada to a gold medal at the 2012 Paralympic Games. After retiring in 2012, the City of Fredericton proclaimed that September 25 would be christened Dave Durepos Day. Two years later, he was inducted into the New Brunswick Sports Hall of Fame. He later coached New Brunswick's Canada Games wheelchair basketball team alongside his wife Sabrina Pettinicchi in 2015.
