= Lori Radke =

Canadian wheelchair basketball player

Personal information
- Nationality: Canada
- Born: 1967 (age 58–59) Wetaskiwin, Alberta, Canada
- Education: University of Alberta
- Height: 5'8
Medal record
Summer Paralympics
Wheelchair basketball
Gold medal – first place	1996 Summer Paralympics	Wheelchair basketball
Gold medal – first place	2000 Summer Paralympics	Wheelchair basketball
Bronze medal – third place	2004 Summer Paralympics	Wheelchair basketball

Lori Radke (born 1967) is a Canadian Paralympic wheelchair basketball player. She has won two gold medals and one bronze at three different Paralympic Games.

== Early life ==
Radke was born in Wetaskiwin, but grew up in Ponoka, Alberta where she attended Ponoka Composite High School and later the University of Alberta. While in high school, she injured her knee and later opted for a knee ligament reconstruction. As a result, she retired from stand-up sports in 1992 in favour of wheelchair reliant ones.

== Career ==
Radke joined Team Canada in 1994 and made her Paralympics debut during the 1996 Summer Paralympics in Atlanta. Despite blowing out both anterior cruciate ligaments, Radke is classified as a 4.5 athlete in wheelchair basketball, meaning she has few if any physical limitations. With Team Canada, Radke won two Paralympic gold medals, one Paralympic bronze medal, and various World Championship titles. In 2008, she was named to Team Canada's roster for the 2008 Summer Paralympics and the Osaka Cup which she chose to forgo. During the 2008 Summer Paralympics, Team Canada placed 5th out of 10 teams.

In 2012 after the Calgary Rollers lost to the BC Breakers in the National Wheelchair Basketball Championships, Radke was named to the All-Star Team. The next year, Radke became a coach with the Calgary Rollers but rejoined the team as a player after a shortage.
