= Volleyball at the 2000 Summer Paralympics =

Volleyball at the XI Paralympic Games
- Paralympic standing and sitting volleyball
- Venue: The Dome and Exhibition Complex

Medalists
1st place, gold medalist(s)		Iran (IRI) (sitting); Germany (GER) (standing)
2nd place, silver medalist(s)		Bosnia and Herzegovina (BIH) (sitting); Canada (CAN) (standing)
3rd place, bronze medalist(s)		Finland (FIN)(sitting); Slovakia (SVK) (standing)

Paralympic symbol (1994-2004)

Volleyball at the 2000 Summer Paralympics in Sydney consisted of standing and sitting volleyball events for men.

== Medal summary ==
Event	Gold	Silver	Bronze
Men's standing	Germany (GER) Pavo Grgic; Marian Warda; Daniel Volkland; Stefan Drabold; Manfred Kohl; Elmar Sommer; Jens Altmann; Bernd Heinrich; Oliver Mueller; Oliver Gutfleisch; Bernard Schmidl; Timo Hager	Canada (CAN) Neil Johnson; Geoff Hammond; John Przybyszewski; José Rebelo; Joey Stabner; Tony Quarin; Wayne Epp; Chris Rodway; Larry Matthews; Jason Migchels; Mikael Bartholdy; Lawrence Flynn	Slovakia (SVK) Jaroslav Makovnik; Peter Nadasky; Peter Meszaros; Pavol Pavlacic; Richard Kovac; Peter Moravcik; Andrej Marcin; Josef Mihalco; Lubomir Novosad; Juraj Kosirel; Marek Tomsik; Pavol Sedlak
Men's sitting	Iran (IRI) Ali Eshghi; Hojjat Behravan; Ali Akbar Salavatian; Parviz Firouzi; Issa Zirahi; Jalil Imeri; Farshid Ashouri; Ali Golkar; Majid Soleimani; Ali Kashfia; Reza Peidayesh; Mohammad Reza Rahimi	Bosnia and Herzegovina (BIH) Dževad Hamzić; Nedžad Salkić; Abid Čišija; Sabahudin Delalić; Nevzet Alić; Zikret Mahmić; Fikret Čausević; Asim Medić; Edin Ibraković; Ševko Nuhanović; Adnan Manko; Ismet Godinjak	Finland (FIN) Veli-Matti Tuominen; Matti Pulli; Olavi Venalainen; Aulis Vistbacka; Lauri Melanen; Sami Tervo; Petri Kapiainen; Jukka Laine; Jari Heino; Keijo Hanninen; Allan Pynnonen

== Medal table ==
Rank	Nation	Gold	Silver	Bronze	Total
1	Germany (GER)	1	0	0	1
1	Iran (IRI)	1	0	0	1
3	Bosnia and Herzegovina (BIH)	0	1	0	1
3	Canada (CAN)	0	1	0	1
5	Finland (FIN)	0	0	1	1
5	Slovakia (SVK)	0	0	1	1
Totals (6 entries)		2	2	2	6

== Men's standing volleyball team rosters ==
Source: International Paralympic Committee

Australia (AUS): Daniel Byrne; Nick Coburn; Japhy Duldig; Joe Egan; Greg Hammond; Brett Holcombe; Nick Kaiser; Adam Lusted; Bill McHoul; Steve Neal; Grant Prest; Nigel Smith	Cambodia (CAM): Phan Chim; Hok Cha; Kimhun Chuoy; Tey Heng; Vandy Im; Sokhea Keam; Bunhorn Kong; Youy Phat; Thy Pin; Chok Som; Vanna Yim	Canada (CAN): Mikael Bartholdy; Wayne Epp; Lawrence Flynn; Geoff Hammond; Neil Johnson; Larry Matthews; Jason Migchels; John Przybyszewski; Tony Quarin; José Rebelo; Chris Rodway; Joey Stabner	Germany (GER): Jens Altmann; Stefan Drabold; Pavo Grgic; Oliver Gutfleisch; Timo Hager; Bernd Heinrich; Manfred Kohl; Oliver Mueller; Bernard Schmidl; Elmar Sommer; Daniel Volkland; Marian Warda
Israel (ISR): Yair Ben Dor; Avi Ben Simhon; Adi Deutsch; Nisim Franko; Daniel Giladi; Gil Gross; Gil Haba; Eliezer Kalina; Zvi Karsh; Hagai Zamir; Chen Zhur	Poland (POL): Tomasz Wozny; Czeslaw Humerski; Andrzej Iwaniak; Janusz Klos; Arkadiusz Koselnik; Jerzy Kruszelnicki; Stanislaw Leja; Piotr Matuszkiewicz; Jacek Molinski; Piotr Moszczynski; Roman Wanecki; Adam Zawislak	Slovakia (SVK): Peter Meszaros; Juraj Kosirel; Richard Kovac; Jaroslav Makovnik; Andrej Marcin; Josef Mihalco; Peter Moravcik; Peter Nadasky; Lubomir Novosad; Pavol Pavlacic; Pavol Sedlak; Marek Tomsik	United States (USA): Jeffrey Eakle; Timo Kujawa; Jeffrey MacMunn; Kyle Mason; David Newkirk; Robert Osbahr; Chris Seilkop; Hugo Storer; Joe Sullivan; Dwight van Tassell; Jeffrey Werner

== Men's sitting volleyball team rosters ==
Source: International Paralympic Committee

Australia (AUS): Edward Bray; Paul Croft; Darren Gay; Albert Lee; Brant North; Kevin Price; Glenn Pyne; Brett Roworth; Greg Sobczak; Bruce Thompson; Mark Whiteman	Bosnia and Herzegovina (BIH): Nevzet Alic; Fikret Causevic; Abid Cisija; Sabahudin Delalic; Ismet Godinjak; Dzevad Hamzic; Edin Ibrakovic; Zikret Mahmic; Adnan Manko; Asim Medic; Sefko Nuhanovic; Nedzad Salkic	Egypt (EGY): Ashraf Abd Alla; Abd Elnabi Abd Ellatif; Mohamed Abd Elyazid; Tamer Awad; Taher El Bahaey; Rezk El Helbawi; Hesham Elshwikh; Adel Hassan; Yasser Hassan; Salah Hassanein; Mohamed Hussein	Finland (FIN): Keijo Hanninen; Jari Heino; Petri Kapiainen; Jukka Laine; Lauri Melanen; Matti Pulli; Allan Pynnonen; Sami Tervo; Veli-Matti Tuominen; Olavi Venalainen; Aulis Vistbacka
Germany (GER): Steffen Barsch; Uwe Haussig; Dirk Mimberg; Thomas Renger; Martin Rickmann; Alexander Schiffler; Juergen Schrapp; Siegmund Soicke; Ferenc Stettner; Stefan von der Trenck; Stefan Wischnewski	Hungary (HUN): Andras Domokos; Janos Gal; Miklos Kekecs; Laszlo Kovacs; Sandor Locsei; Sandor Makarovszki; Attila Manyak; Janos Peres; Jozsef Stirczer; Laszlo Szabo; Lajos Szecsenyi; Laszlo Szigedi	Iran (IRI): Farshid Ashouri; Hojat Behravan; Jalil Eimeri; Ali Eshaghi; Parviz Firouzi; Ali Golkar Azghandi; Ali Kashifa; Reza Peidayesh; Mohammad Reza Rahimi; Aliakbar Salavatian; Majid Soleimanikhoramdasht; Isa Zirahi	Japan (JPN): Atsushi Yonezawa; Junichi Arifuku; Masahiko Kato; Robert Nakayama; Masahiro Sasaki; Ei Sato; Toshinari Shikine; Yoshihito Takeda; Tsutomu Tanabe; Koji Tanaka; Hiroyuki Wakairo; Hitoshi Yoshida
South Korea (KOR): Young Kil Back; Seon Ju Jeon; Duk Chan Kang; Bong Ju Kim; Sung Hoon Kim; Jun Him Lee; Kyoung Rok Moon; Myung Jong Na; Hyun Dong Park; Woo Sung Park; Gu Hwaun Seo; Chul Ho Yoon	Libya (LBA): Saleh Ibrahim Abdelgader Saleh; Mustafa Abusetin; Salah Alaguri; Mousbah Almednene; Abulgasem Elghashir; Zuhair Elkelabe; Salem Emhemed Salem; Salem Mansur; Hashem Saeid; Ali Said Salil; Gama Susaen; Abdulhakim Zaituni	Netherlands (NED): Henk Aalders; Ron Durge; Martin Lijssen; Harry Oomen; Alfred Oonk; Johan Reekers; Stefan Tibben; Edwin Timmerman; Pieter Top; Edwin van der Broek; Andre Venderbosch; Johan Verstappen	United States (USA): Matthew Coppens; William Demby; James Dugan; Matthew Glowacki; Essam Hamido; Bradley Johnson; James Kesler; Tracey Lange; Curtis Lease; Paul Moran; Kurt Smith; James Terpenning
