= Sabrina Durepos =

Canadian wheelchair basketball player

Personal information
- Born: Sabrina Pettinicchi; August 9, 1972 (age 53) Quebec, Canada
- Height: 5 ft 6 in (168 cm)
- Weight: 115 lb (52 kg)
- Spouse: Dave Durepos

Sport
- Country: Canada
- Sport: Wheelchair basketball (1992–2008)
- Team: Canada women's national wheelchair basketball team
- Turned pro: 1991
- Retired: 2008
Medal record
Wheelchair basketball
Representing Canada
Paralympic Games
Gold medal – first place	1996 Atlanta	Team
Gold medal – first place	2000 Sydney	Team
Bronze medal – third place	2004 Athens	Team
World Championships
Gold medal – first place	1996 Sydney	Team
Gold medal – first place	2002 Kitakyushu	Team
Gold medal – first place	2006 Amsterdam	Team

Sabrina Durepos (née Pettinicchi) (born August 9, 1972) is a Canadian retired wheelchair basketball player. As a member of Team Canada, she won two gold medals and one bronze at the Paralympic Games, as well as three golds at the Wheelchair Basketball World Championship.

== Early life ==
Durepos was born on August 9, 1972, in Quebec, Canada. After finishing her first year of CEGEP in June 1990, she was permanently injured in a car accident.

== Career ==
Durepos began playing wheelchair basketball in 1991 and eventually qualified for Canada women's national wheelchair basketball team at the 1996 Summer Paralympics. She won gold medals with Team Canada at the 1996 and 2000 Paralympics, and a bronze medal at the 2004 Paralympics. She also earned 3 consecutive Wheelchair Basketball World Championship gold medals from 1998 to 2006. In 2001, Durepos was sponsored by National Hockey League (NHL) player Vincent Damphousse, who helped her buy a new wheelchair. She was also named a YWCA Montreal Women of Distinction. Durepos was the fourth-best scorer on Team Canada during the 2006 Wheelchair Basketball World Championship with 8 points. During the 2008 Summer Paralympics, where Team Canada finished fifth, Durepos recorded a team-leading 14 points and 6 rebounds.

In 2010, Durepos took part in the first Canadian Paralympic Torch relay.

In 2024, both Durepos and her husband were inducted into the Wheelchair Basketball Canada Hall of Fame.

== Personal life ==
Durepos is married to wheelchair basketball player Dave Durepos. From 1997 until 2004, Durepos also worked as an interior designer and project manager for Hydro-Québec.
