= Mathieu Parent =

Canadian Paralympic athlete

Medal record

Paralympic athletics

Representing Canada

Paralympic Games
Bronze medal – third place	2000 Sydney	4x100 metre relay - T54

Mathieu Parent is a paralympic athlete from Canada competing mainly in category T54 wheelchair racing events.

== Biography ==
Mathieu competed in six events at the 2000 Summer Paralympics covering the 200m, 400m, 800m, 1500m, and both relays. His only medal success came in the 4 × 100 m relay where the Canadian team won the bronze medal.
