= Sebastian Przybyszewski =

Polish footballer

Personal information
- Date of birth: 13 February 1981 (age 45)
- Place of birth: Łódź, Poland
- Height: 1.91 m (6 ft 3 in)
- Position: Defender

Youth career
- ŁKS Łódź

Senior career*
| Years | Team | Apps | (Gls) |
| 1999–2000 | Widzew Łódź II | | |
| 2000–2001 | Hetman Zamość | 62 | (2) |
| 2002 | Pogoń Szczecin | 9 | (0) |
| 2003–2009 | ŁKS Łódź | 96 | (2) |
| 2005 | → Hetman Zamość (loan) | | |
| 2008 | → Śląsk Wrocław (loan) | 4 | (0) |
| 2009–2010 | Warta Poznań | 7 | (0) |
| 2010–2012 | Pelikan Łowicz | 29 | (4) |
| 2012–2013 | Stal Rzeszów | 19 | (2) |
| 2013 | Zawisza Rzgów | 34 | (1) |
| 2014 | Eintracht Stadtallendorf | 11 | (2) |
| 2014–2017 | SV Emsdorf | | |

Managerial career
- 2020–2023: Eintracht Stadtallendorf (assistant)
- * Club domestic league appearances and goals

Sebastian Przybyszewski (born 13 February 1981) is a Polish football coach and former player who played as a defender.

== Career ==
Przybyszewski started his career with Hetman Zamość.
