= Pavol Pavlačič =

Slovak Paralympic volleyball player

Medal record
Men's volleyball
Representing Slovakia
Paralympic Games
Bronze medal – third place	2000 Sydney	Volleyball - standing

Pavol Pavlačič competed for Slovakia in the men's standing volleyball event at the 2000 Summer Paralympics, winning a bronze medal.

== See also ==
- Slovakia at the 2000 Summer Paralympics
