= Marnie Peters =

Personal information
- National team: Canada
- Born: 1970 or 1971 (age 55–56) Grimsby, Ontario, Canada

Sport
- Country: Canada
- Sport: Wheelchair basketball
- Disability: Paraplegia
Medal record
Women's Wheelchair basketball
Representing Canada
Event	1st	2nd	3rd
Parapan American Games	1	0	0
Paralympic Games	1	0	0
Wheelchair Basketball World Championship	1	0	0
Total	3	0	0
Parapan American Games
Gold medal – first place	1999 Mexico City	Women's wheelchair basketball
Paralympic Games
Gold medal – first place	2000 Sydney	Women's wheelchair basketball
Wheelchair Basketball World Championship
Gold medal – first place	2002 World Championships	Women's wheelchair basketball

Marnie Peters (born in either 1970 or 1971) is a Canadian former wheelchair basketball player and accessibility consultant who won gold medals in each of the women's wheelchair basketball tournament at the 2000 Summer Paralympics and the 2002 Women's Wheelchair Basketball World Championship. She was also part of the Ottawa Shooters team that won the 1995 Canadian Wheelchair Basketball League National Championship and took gold at the women's wheelchair basketball competition at the 1999 Parapan American Games.

== Personal background ==
Peters was born in either 1970 or 1971 and comes from Grimsby, Ontario, close to Hamilton. At age 17, she lost the use of both her legs in an automobile accident. Peters opted to relocate to Ottawa to study at the University of Ottawa.

== Career ==
She had played in sports prior to her paralysis and was disinterested in learning about disabled sports because she was angry and had other tasks to do. Peters changed her mind when she began gaining weight during her first year of university and thought of taking up wheelchair basketball to learn how it was played. At first, she did not want to play the sport competitively until she started to play it more and earned a nomination to be drafted to the Canada women's national wheelchair basketball team.

At the 1995 Canadian Wheelchair Basketball League National Championship held in Montpetit Hall, Ottawa, Peters was part of the Ottawa Shooters team that came from behind to claim the gold medal with a 74–68 win over Kitsilano Crunch with her contributing points in the championship match. She was selected to be an alternate for the Canada women's national wheelchair basketball squad at the 1996 Summer Paralympics in Atlanta, United States, and joined the national side two years later. Peters was part of the team that defeated the United States 46–34 at the championship match of the women's wheelchair basketball competition held as part of the 1999 Parapan American Games in Mexico City to earn qualification to the women's wheelchair basketball tournament staged at the 2000 Summer Paralympics in Sydney, Australia.

In Sydney, the Canadian team she played with won every group match as well as the semi-final to earn gold medal honors in the final. She continued playing for the Canada women's national squad for the 2001–2002 season, and she was part of the gold medal-winning side at the 2002 Women's Wheelchair Basketball World Championship that took place in Kitakyushu, Japan. Peters competed for the local basketball club Ottawa Jazz that forms part of the Ottawa Carleton Wheelchair Sports Association, and she volunteered with the Royal Tip-Off program aiding elementary and secondary school students get more aware and accepting of wheelchair users. She was due to play in the women's wheelchair basketball competition at the 2004 Summer Paralympics in Athens, Greece until the Canadian Wheelchair Basketball Association opted not to include her on the final squad list. Peters' appeal against the decision was rejected.

Peters has been president of the Accessibility Simplified disability access company for more than two decades. She is also executive officer of the non-profit Global Alliance on Accessible Technologies and Environments non-governmental organization that promotes accessibility of built and virtual environments. Peters was project manager of several complex Universal Design and auditing projects and was a team member on several other projects. She developed comprehensive code comparison matrices and has partaken in developing accessibility guidelines, presentations, training and standards. Peters helped to research and develop technical databases to apply technical requirements for building codes in Canada and abroad.

== Media appearances ==
She was featured in the final episode of the six-part They've Got Game documentary television series broadcast on WTSN in January 2003. Peters broadcast the German documentary My Way to Olympia as part of NWT Disability Awareness Week in Yellowknife on June 10, 2015.
