= Renee del Colle =

Canadian wheelchair basketball player (born 1967/8)

Renée Del Colle
Personal information
- National team: Canada
- Born: 1967 or 1968 (age 57–58) Calgary, Alberta, Canada

Sport
- Country: Canada
- Sport: Wheelchair basketball
- Disability: Lupus
Medal record
Women's Wheelchair basketball
Representing Canada
Event	1st	2nd	3rd
Paralympic Games	2	0	0
Wheelchair Basketball World Championship	2	0	0
Total	4	0	0
Paralympic Games
Gold medal – first place	1996 Atlanta	Women's wheelchair basketball
Gold medal – first place	2000 Sydney	Women's wheelchair basketball
Wheelchair Basketball World Championship
Gold medal – first place	1994 World Championships	Women's wheelchair basketball
Gold medal – first place	1998 World Championships	Women's wheelchair basketball

Renée Del Colle (born 1967/8) is a Canadian wheelchair basketball player who played for the Canada women's national wheelchair basketball team in international competition. She won two Paralympic gold medals representing the women's national wheelchair basketball squad at both the 1996 Summer Paralympics and the 2000 Summer Paralympics as well as two victories in the final of the Wheelchair Basketball World Championship in each of 1994 and 1998.

== Biography ==
Del Colle was born in either 1967 and 1968, and comes from Calgary, Alberta. Until the age of 12, she played regularly organized basketball in high school in Edmonton but stopped being involved in the sport following injury and illness and failed to be drafted in the Canada national junior women's basketball squad. This was before Del Colle was diagnosed with the incurable autoimmune disease known as lupus in which the antibodies in her blood attack separate organs. She was listed at 6 ft 1 in (1.85 m); Del Colle did not regularly use a wheelchair while walking but she did in competition. At the age of 21, she took up wheelchair basketball, and learnt of the existence of the Canada women's national wheelchair basketball team in 1991. Del Colle signed up for a tryout with the team and was signed to the 1992 team within half a year. She worked as a news anchor and reporter at multiple Albertan radio stations for half a decade.

Following her joining the Northern Lights wheelchair basketball squad, Del Colle job shared before she left the radio business to get a job working flexible hours at an Edmonton bakery when she was chosen to play for the national team in 1992. She was part of the Canada team that claimed the Wheelchair Basketball World Championship in the United Kingdom by beating the United States in the 1994 final. She partook in the women's tournament in the sport of wheelchair basketball at the 1996 Summer Paralympics in Atlanta, United States. Del Colle contributed to the team finishing first in their group by winning all three of their games and subsequently advancing to the final of the competition. She helped Canada to claim the gold medal in the final match that was held on August 25, 1996. In August 1997, she and her husband Darcy moved to Edmonton from Calgary.

Del Colle was selected as one of five Calgary athletes to represent the Canadian team that competed at the quadrennial Wheelchair Basketball World Championship held in late October 1998 in Sydney, Australia. She scored 18 points as well as three blocked shots and 11 rebounds in Canada's 53–25 semi-final victory over Japan to face the United States in the final. In the final, Del Colle scored 23 points in helping Canada beat the United States 54–38 for the gold medal and their second successive women's world title win. At the 2000 Summer Paralympics, she played for the Canada national wheelchair basketball team in the women's wheelchair basketball tournament as one of five disabled athletes from Calgary, and she first competed in the round-robin group opposite Germany, Japan and Mexico. The team finished first in their group and reached the final that they won to earn Del Colle the second (and final) Paralympic gold medal of her career. She contributed Canada's second-highest points total of 10 during the final.

== Recognition ==
In 2001, Del Colle received City of Calgary Recognition to honor her achievements in wheelchair basketball.
