= Caitlin Renneson =

Canadian Paralympic rower

Medal record

Paralympic athletics

Representing Canada

Paralympic Games
Bronze medal – third place	2000 Sydney	400 metres - T34

Caitlin Renneson is a paralympic athlete from Canada competing mainly in category T34 sprint events.

Caitlin began her Paralympic career in the sprints at the 2000 Summer Paralympics competing in the T34 class 100m, 200m, and 400m, winning a bronze medal in the latter. After missing the 2004 games she returned in 2008 to compete in the rowing events as part of the unsuccessful Mixed double sculls in the TAMix2x class.
