= Norbert Holík =

Slovak Paralympic athlete (born 1972)

Personal information
- Nationality: Slovak
- Born: 14 May 1972 (age 54) Žiar nad Hronom, Czechoslovakia
Medal record
Representing Slovakia
Summer Paralympic Games
Men's para-athletics (P13)
Bronze medal – third place	2000 Sydney	Pentathlon – P13
Winter Paralympic Games
Men's para-alpine skiing (B3)
Bronze medal – third place	2002 Salt Lake City	Slalom – B3

Norbert Holík (born 14 May 1972 in Žiar nad Hronom) is a Paralympian athlete from Slovakia who competes mainly in category P13 pentathlon events.

== Biography ==
He competed in the 2000 Summer Paralympics in Sydney, Australia. There he won a bronze medal in the men's Pentathlon – P13 event. He also competed at the 2004 Summer Paralympics in Athens, Greece. There he finished sixth in the men's Pentathlon – P13 event. He also competed in alpine skiing at the 2002 Winter Paralympics, 2006 Winter Paralympics and 2010 Winter Paralympics. In Salt Lake City in 2002, Holík won a bronze medal in slalom.
