= František Gödri =

Slovakian Paralympic athlete

Personal information
- Born: 17 April 1955 (age 71)
Medal record
Track and field (B2)
Paralympic Games
Representing Czechoslovakia
Bronze medal – third place	1992 Barcelona	Pentathlon - B2
Representing Slovakia
Bronze medal – third place	1996 Atlanta	Pentathlon - P11

František Gödri (born 17 April 1955) is a Paralympic athlete from Slovakia competing mainly in category P12 pentathlon events.

== Biography ==
He competed in the 1992 Summer Paralympics in Barcelona, Spain. There he went out in the first round of the men's 100 metres - B2 event, finished fifth in the men's 200 metres - B2 event, went out in the first round of the men's 400 metres - B2 event and a bronze medal in the men's Pentathlon - B2 event. He competed in the 1996 Summer Paralympics in Atlanta, United States. There he won a bronze medal in the men's Pentathlon - P11 event and finished eleventh in the men's Long jump - F11 event. He also competed at the 2000 Summer Paralympics in Sydney, Australia but did not finish in the men's Pentathlon - P12 event.
