= Anton Sluka =

Slovak Paralympic athlete

Medal record
Track and field (athletics)
Paralympic Games
Representing Czechoslovakia
Silver medal – second place	1992 Barcelona	Marathon - B3
Representing Slovakia
Gold medal – first place	1996 Atlanta	Marathon - T12
Silver medal – second place	2000 Sydney	Marathon - T13

Anton Sluka is a paralympic athlete from Slovakia competing mainly in category B3 marathon events.

Anton first competed in the Paralympics in 1992 in Barcelona for Czechoslovakia where he finished fifth in the 5000m and won the silver medal behind Britain's Mark Farnell in the Marathon. Four years later at the 1996 Paralympic Games in Atlanta, competing for Slovakia, Anton reversed the result of four years earlier in taken the Marathon gold ahead of silver medalist Mark Farnell. At the 2000 Paralympic Games Anton won his second Marathon silver medal, this proved to be the last time he finished a Paralympic Marathon as in 2004 he failed to finish in the Athens Marathon.
