= Jessica Sloan =

Canadian Paralympic swimmer

Personal information
- Born: 2 November 1982 (age 43) Calgary, Alberta, Canada

Sport
- Country: Canada
- Sport: Paralympic swimming
- Disability class: S10
Medal record
Paralympic swimming
Representing Canada
Paralympic Games
Gold medal – first place	2000 Sydney	50m freestyle S10
Gold medal – first place	2000 Sydney	100m freestyle S10
Gold medal – first place	2000 Sydney	100m breaststroke SB9
Gold medal – first place	2000 Sydney	200m individual medley SM10
Gold medal – first place	2000 Sydney	4x100m freestyle relay 34pts
Gold medal – first place	2000 Sydney	4x100m medley relay 34pts
World Championships
Gold medal – first place	1998 Christchurch	50m freestyle S10
Gold medal – first place	1998 Christchurch	100m freestyle S10
Gold medal – first place	1998 Christchurch	100m breaststroke SB9
Gold medal – first place	1998 Christchurch	200m individual medley SM10
Gold medal – first place	1998 Christchurch	4x100m freestyle relay open
Gold medal – first place	1998 Christchurch	4x100m medley relay open

Jessica Sloan (born November 2, 1982, in Calgary, Alberta) is a Canadian swimmer who won six gold medals in the 2000 Summer Paralympics. In the games, held in Sydney, she won gold in freestyle (100m and 50m), breaststroke (100m), individual medley (200m), relay medley, and freestyle relay.

She was considered for the 2000 Lou Marsh Trophy.

== Personal life ==
Sloan is one of many elite Canadian athletes to have attended high school at the National Sport School operated by the Calgary Board of Education. Sloan is now one of the coaches for the Provo aquatics club or PAC for short along with Ezekial Hall.
