= Slovakia at the 1996 Summer Paralympics =

- IPC code: SVK
- NPC: Slovak Paralympic Committee
- Website: www.spv.sk

in Atlanta
- Competitors: 28 (23 men and 5 women)
- Medals Ranked 39th: Gold 2 Silver 4 Bronze 5 Total 11

Summer Paralympics appearances (overview)
- 1996; 2000; 2004; 2008; 2012; 2016; 2020; 2024

Other related appearances
- Czechoslovakia (1972–1992)

28 athletes (23 men and 5 women) from Slovakia competed at the 1996 Summer Paralympics in Atlanta, United States.

== Medallists ==
Medal	Name	Sport	Event
Gold	Anton Sluka	Athletics	Men's marathon T12
Gold	Andrej Zaťko	Swimming	Men's 50m butterfly S3
Silver	Pavel Takac; Miroslav Jambor	Cycling	Men's 200m sprint tandem open
Silver	Margita Prokeinova	Swimming	Women's 50m butterfly S7
Silver	Ladislav Gaspar	Table tennis	Men's open 6-10
Bronze	Frantisek Godri	Athletics	Men's pentathlon P11
Bronze	Andrej Zaťko	Swimming	Men's 50m breaststroke SB2
Bronze	Margita Prokeinova	Swimming	Women's 50m freestyle S7
Bronze	Ladislav Gaspar	Table tennis	Men's singles 9
Bronze	Ladislav Gaspar; Emil Dovalovszki	Table tennis	Men's teams 9-10

== See also ==
- Slovakia at the Paralympics
- Slovakia at the 1996 Summer Olympics
