= Germany at the 2000 Summer Paralympics =

- IPC code: GER
- NPC: National Paralympic Committee Germany
- Website: www.dbs-npc.de (in German)

in Sydney
- Competitors: 251 (182 male, 69 female)
- Medals Ranked 10th: Gold 16 Silver 41 Bronze 38 Total 95

Summer Paralympics appearances (overview)
- 1960; 1964; 1968; 1972; 1976; 1980; 1984; 1988; 1992; 1996; 2000; 2004; 2008; 2012; 2016; 2020; 2024

Other related appearances
- East Germany (1984)

There were 69 female and 182 male athletes representing the country at the 2000 Summer Paralympics. They won 95 medals (16 gold, 41 silver, 38 bronze).

== Medal table ==
Medal	Name	Sport	Event
Gold	Siegmund Hegeholz	Athletics	Men's javelin F11
Gold	Sven Solbrig	Athletics	Men's javelin F46
Gold	Birgit Pohl	Athletics	Women's discus F33-34
Gold	Catherine Bader-Bille	Athletics	Women's long jump F46
Gold	Michaela Daamen	Athletics	Women's shot put F44
Gold	Britta Jänicke	Athletics	Women's shot put F46
Gold	Marianne Buggenhagen	Athletics	Women's shot put F55
Gold	Michaela Fuchs; Jan Ratzke	Cycling	Mixed sprint tandem open
Gold	Bernd Vogel	Powerlifting	Men's -90 kg
Gold	Heiko Kröger	Sailing	Single person 2.4mr
Gold	Annke Conradi	Swimming	Women's 50m backstroke S3
Gold	Jochen Wollmert	Table tennis	Men's singles 7
Gold	Daniel Arnold; Christian Koppelberg; Thomas Kurfess	Table tennis	Men's team 6-7
Gold	Christiane Pape	Table tennis	Women's singles 4
Gold	Pavo Grgic; Marian Warda; Daniel Volkland; Stefan Drabold; Manfred Kohl; Elmar Sommer; Jens Altmann; Bernd Heinrich; Oliver Mueller; Oliver Gutfleisch; Bernard Schmidl; Timo Hager	Volleyball	Men's standing team
Silver	Peter Haber	Athletics	Men's 100m T37
Silver	Marcus Ehm	Athletics	Men's 400m T44
Silver	Heinrich Koeberle	Athletics	Men's marathon T51
Silver	Andreas Müller	Athletics	Men's discus F34
Silver	Rayk Haucke	Athletics	Men's javelin F11
Silver	Isabelle Förder	Athletics	Women's 100m T37
Silver	Sabine Wagner	Athletics	Women's 100m T44
Silver	Sabine Wagner	Athletics	Women's 200m T44
Silver	Claudia Meier	Athletics	Women's 1500m T12
Silver	Claudia Meier	Athletics	Women's 5000m T12
Silver	Simona Kegel	Athletics	Women's shot put F37
Silver	Martina Willing	Athletics	Women's shot put F57
Silver	Klaus Lungershausen	Cycling	Mixed bicycle road race CP div 4
Silver	Klaus Lungershausen	Cycling	Mixed bicycle time trial CP div 4
Silver	Michaela Fuchs; Eva Fuenfgeld	Cycling	Women's tandem open
Silver	Michaela Fuchs; Jan Ratzke	Cycling	Mixed 1 km time trial tandem open
Silver	Peter Riechl; Peter Muenter; Jens Kroker	Sailing	Three person Sonar
Silver	Josef Neumaier	Shooting	Men's free rifle 3x40 SH1
Silver	Sabine Brogle	Shooting	Women's air rifle standing SH1
Silver	Sabine Brogle	Shooting	Women's sport rifle 3x20 SH1
Silver	Wolfgang Stöckl	Shooting	Mixed air rifle prone SH2
Silver	Christiane Latzke	Shooting	Mixed air rifle standing SH2
Silver	Swen Michaelis	Swimming	Men's 100m backstroke S6
Silver	Holger Kimmig	Swimming	Men's 100m backstroke S8
Silver	Holger Kimmig	Swimming	Men's 100m freestyle S8
Silver	Annke Conradi	Swimming	Women's 50m freestyle S3
Silver	Kay Espenhayn	Swimming	Women's 50m freestyle S4
Silver	Daniela Röhle	Swimming	Women's 100m backstroke S11
Silver	Annke Conradi	Swimming	Women's 100m freestyle S3
Silver	Kay Espenhayn	Swimming	Women's 100m freestyle S4
Silver	Kay Espenhayn	Swimming	Women's 150m individual medley SM4
Silver	Kay Espenhayn	Swimming	Women's 200m freestyle S4
Silver	Daniela Pohl; Maria Goetze; Kay Espenhayn; Annke Conradi	Swimming	Women's 4x50m medley relay 20 pts
Silver	Daniel Arnold	Table tennis	Men's singles 6
Silver	Monika Sikora	Table tennis	Women's singles 4
Silver	Monika Bartheidel; Beate Schippmann	Table tennis	Women's teams 1-3
Silver	Christiane Pape; Monika Sikora	Table tennis	Women's teams 4-5
Silver	Udo Schwarz	Wheelchair fencing	Men's épée individual A
Silver	Wilfried Lipinski; Udo Schwarz; Juergen Mayer; Uwe Bartmann	Wheelchair fencing	Men's épée team
Silver	Silke Schwarz	Wheelchair fencing	Women's épée individual A
Silver	Silke Schwarz; Waltraud Stollwerck; Esther Weber-Kranz; Carmen Hillinger	Wheelchair fencing	Women's épée team
Silver	Esther Weber-Kranz	Wheelchair fencing	Women's foil individual B
Bronze	Robert Figl	Athletics	Men's 1500m T54
Bronze	Thorston Oppold	Athletics	Men's marathon T51
Bronze	Martin Horn; Georg Meyer; Marcus Ehm; Reinhold Boetzel	Athletics	Men's 4 × 100 m relay T46
Bronze	Steffen Woischnik; Drazen Boric; Ralph Brunner; Robert Figl	Athletics	Men's 4 × 400 m relay T54
Bronze	Gunther Belitz	Athletics	Men's high jump F42
Bronze	Joerg Frischmann	Athletics	Men's javelin F44
Bronze	Joerg Schiedek	Athletics	Men's javelin F46
Bronze	Joerg Trippen-Hilgers	Athletics	Men's long jump F12
Bronze	Rene Schramm	Athletics	Men's long jump F37
Bronze	Joerg Frischmann	Athletics	Men's shot put F44
Bronze	Ulrich Iser	Athletics	Men's shot put F55
Bronze	Gerhard Wies	Athletics	Men's shot put F56
Bronze	Rayk Haucke	Athletics	Men's pentathlon P11
Bronze	Horst Beyer	Athletics	Men's pentathlon P42
Bronze	Yvonne Sehmisch	Athletics	Women's 100m T54
Bronze	Yvonne Sehmisch	Athletics	Women's 200m T54
Bronze	Britta Jaenicke	Athletics	Women's discus F46
Bronze	Jessica Sachse	Athletics	Women's javelin F46
Bronze	Siena Christen	Athletics	Women's shot put F12
Bronze	Martin Osewald	Judo	Men's +100 kg
Bronze	Alfred Beringer	Shooting	Mixed free rifle prone SH1
Bronze	Thomas Grimm	Swimming	Men's 100m breaststroke SB5
Bronze	Lars Luerig	Swimming	Men's 100m freestyle S5
Bronze	Lars Luerig	Swimming	Men's 200m freestyle S5
Bronze	Thomas Grimm	Swimming	Men's 200m individual medley SM6
Bronze	Holger Kimmig	Swimming	Men's 200m individual medley SM8
Bronze	Maria Götze	Swimming	Women's 200m individual medley SM6
Bronze	Claudia Hengst	Swimming	Women's 200m individual medley SM10
Bronze	Maria Götze	Swimming	Women's 400m freestyle S6
Bronze	Claudia Hengst	Swimming	Women's 400m freestyle S10
Bronze	Jochen Wollmert; Thomas Schmitt; Dirk Hudarin	Table tennis	Men's teams 8
Bronze	Monika Bartheidel	Table tennis	Women's singles 3
Bronze	Wolfgang Kempf	Wheelchair fencing	Men's sabre individual A
Bronze	Esther Weber-Kranz	Wheelchair fencing	Women's épée individual B
Bronze	Silke Schwarz; Waltraud Stollwerck; Esther Weber-Kranz; Carmen Hillinger	Wheelchair fencing	Women's foil team
Bronze	Kai Schramayer	Wheelchair tennis	Men's singles
Bronze	Christine Otterbach; Petra Sax-Scharl	Wheelchair tennis	Women's doubles

== Archery ==
Men

Athlete	Event	Ranking Round		Round of 32	Round of 16	Quarterfinals	Semifinals	Finals	
Athlete	Event	Score	Seed	Opposition Score	Opposition Score	Opposition Score	Opposition Score	Opposition Score	Rank
Jürgen Diederich	Men's individual standing	526	23	Lee (KOR); W 140–137	Lyócsa (SVK); L 131–145	Did not advance			
Reiner Schmidt	Men's individual standing	548	18	Gaspar (ESP); L 136–145	Did not advance				
Reiner Schneider	Men's individual W1	596	5	—N/a	Bye	Miladinovic (FRA); L 102–105	Did not advance		
Hermann Nortmann	Men's individual W2	573	18	Marshall (AUS); L 130–138	Did not advance				
Hermann Nortmann; Reiner Schmidt; Reiner Schneider	Men's team	1717	8	—N/a	Australia (AUS); L 190–197	Did not advance			

Women

Athlete	Event	Ranking Round		Round of 16	Quarterfinals	Semifinals	Finals	
Athlete	Event	Score	Seed	Opposition Score	Opposition Score	Opposition Score	Opposition Score	Rank
Maria Droste	Women's individual W1/W2	455	11	Smith (GBR); L 100–143	Did not advance			
Caroline Ott	Women's individual W1/W2	445	12	Heule (SUI); L 96–131	Did not advance			
Tanja Schultz	Women's individual W1/W2	397	13	Suzuki (JPN); L 111–114	Did not advance			
Maria Droste; Caroline Ott; Tanja Schultz	Women's team	1297	6	—N/a	Great Britain (GBR); L 166–204	Did not advance		

== Athletics ==
Men
Track & road events

Athlete	Event	Heat		Semifinal		Final	
Athlete	Event	Result	Rank	Result	Rank	Result	Rank
Holger Geffers	100 m T12	12.19	3	Did not advance			
Ingo Geffers	100 m T12	12.16	3	Did not advance			
Alessandro Marinelli	100 m T36	15.15	5	—N/a		Did not advance	
Peter Haber	100 m T37	12.34 SB	1 Q	—N/a		12.38	2nd place, silver medalist(s)
René Schramm	100 m T37	12.92	3	—N/a		Did not advance	
Michael Haraem	100 m T42	14.39	3 Q	—N/a		14.15	6
Tim Klinker	100 m T42	14.71	5	—N/a		Did not advance	
Marcus Ehm	100 m T44	12.10	2 Q	—N/a		11.92	5
Martin Horn	100 m T44	12.33	3	—N/a		Did not advance	
Steffen Woischnik	100 m T54	14.58 SB	2 Q	—N/a		15.10	6
Holger Geffers	200 m T12	24.73	3	Did not advance			
Ingo Geffers	200 m T12	24.47	3	Did not advance			
Alessandro Marinelli	200 m T36	31.46	5	—N/a		Did not advance	
Peter Haber	200 m T37	25.45 SB	2 Q	—N/a		25.29 SB	4
Jens Wiegmann	200 m T37	27.69	7	—N/a		Did not advance	
Michael Haraem	200 m T42	—N/a				29.51	4
Marcue Ehm	200 m T44	24.76	2 Q	—N/a		24.01 SB	3rd place, bronze medalist(s)
Georg Meyer	200 m T46	DNF		—N/a		Did not advance	
Winfried Sigg	200 m T53	30.02	6	—N/a		Did not advance	
Max Weber	200 m T53	29.36	3 Q	—N/a		28.83	6
Steffen Woischnik	200 m T54	26.16 SB	1 Q	—N/a		25.97 SB	5
Holger Geffers	400 m T12	DNF		Did not advance			
Ingo Geffers	400 m T12	53.52	3 q	53.55	4	Did not advance	
Marcus Ehm	400 m T44	56.46	2 Q	—N/a		54.75 SB	2nd place, silver medalist(s)
Heinrich Köberle	400 m T51	1:37.09	4	—N/a		Did not advance	
Thorsten Oppold	400 m T51	1:26.59	3 Q	—N/a		1:34.69	7
Drazen Boric	400 m T53	52.54 SB	1 Q	—N/a		52.80	4
Winfried Sigg	400 m T53	55.55	7	—N/a		Did not advance	
Max Weber	400 m T53	54.23	4 q	—N/a		53.28	7
Ralph Brunner	400 m T54	50.74	3 Q	52.56	6	Did not advance	
Robert Figl	400 m T54	51.31	2 Q	50.41 SB	4 Q	51.41	7
Steffen Woischnik	400 m T54	50.53	2 Q	50.07	3 Q	49.53 SB	5
Rainer Schliermann	800 m T12	2:02.50	3 q	—N/a		DQ	
Heinrich Köberle	800 m T51	3:20.46	5	—N/a		Did not advance	
Thorsten Oppold	800 m T51	2:59.69	3 Q	—N/a		2:57.50	6
Drazen Boric	800 m T53	1:46.82	3 Q	—N/a		1:45.71	4
Winfried Sigg	800 m T53	1:47.03	4 q	—N/a		1:46.87	6
Max Weber	800 m T53	1:48.08	2 Q	—N/a		1:46.60	5
Ralph Brunner	800 m T54	1:42.84	5	Did not advance			
Robert Figl	800 m T54	1:40.87 SB	3 Q	1:40.06 SB	4 q	1:38.75 SB	4
Thomas Weinsheimer	800 m T54	1:43.39	6	Did not advance			
Rainer Schliermann	1500 m T12	4:16.16 SB	3 q	—N/a		4:16.54	4
Heinrich Köberle	1500 m T51	—N/a				6:19.50	9
Thorsten Oppold	1500 m T51	—N/a				5:21.17 SB	4
Ralph Brunner	1500 m T54	3:13.89	6	Did not advance			
Robert Figl	1500 m T54	3:11.52	4 Q	3:05.80	6 q	3:11.34	3rd place, bronze medalist(s)
Thomas Weinsheimer	1500 m T54	3:24.16	5	Did not advance			
Ralph Brunner	5000 m T54	10:56.42	6 Q	DNF		Did not advance	
Alfred Hufnagel	5000 m T54	10:49.31	9	Did not advance			
Thomas Weinsheimer	5000 m T54	10:48.48	7 q	10:39.78	11	Did not advance	
Alfred Hufnagel	10,000 m T54	24:04.34	6	—N/a		Did not advance	
Klaus Meyer	Marathon T11	—N/a				2:53:54	5
Heinrich Köberle	Marathon T51	—N/a				2:48:45	2nd place, silver medalist(s)
Thorsten Oppold	Marathon T51	—N/a				2:56:40	3rd place, bronze medalist(s)
Ralph Brunner	Marathon T54	—N/a				1:36:59	17
Robert Figl	Marathon T54	—N/a				1:39:23	24
Winfried Sigg	Marathon T54	—N/a				1:39:26	26
Max Weber	Marathon T54	—N/a				1:47:28	34
Alessandro Marinelli; Peter Haber; Jens Wiegmann; René Schramm; Mirko Kuhlmey (heats)	4 × 100 m relay T38	53.28	3 Q	—N/a		50.90	5
Martin Horn; Georg Meyer; Marcus Ehm; Reinhold Bötzel	4 × 100 m relay T46	—N/a				46.15	3rd place, bronze medalist(s)
Steffen Woischnik; Ralph Brunner; Max Weber; Robert Figl	4 × 100 m relay T54	DQ		—N/a		Did not advance	
Ingo Geffers; Rainer Schliermann; Holger Geffers; Rayk Haucke	4 × 400 m relay T13	—N/a				3:40.47	4
Martin Horn; Georg Meyer; Jörg Schiedek; Marcus Ehm	4 × 400 m relay T46	—N/a				DQ	
Steffen Woischnik; Drazen Boric; Ralph Brunner; Robert Figl	4 × 400 m relay T54	3:20.71	1 q	—N/a		3:23.58	3rd place, bronze medalist(s)

Field events

Athlete	Event	Final	
Athlete	Event	Distance	Position
Gunther Belitz	High jump F42	1.66	3rd place, bronze medalist(s)
Detlef Eckert	High jump F42	1.66	4
Andreas Siegl	High jump F42	1.61	5
Reinhold Bötzel	High jump F46	1.84	5
Georg Meyer	High jump F46	1.87 SB	4
Jörg Trippen-Hilgers	Long jump F12	6.57	3rd place, bronze medalist(s)
René Schramm	Long jump F37	5.46 SB	3rd place, bronze medalist(s)
Jens Wiegmann	Long jump F37	5.12	5
Gunther Belitz	Long jump F42	4.47	7
Tim Klinker	Long jump F42	4.70	6
Andreas Siegl	Long jump F42	4.02	11
Reinhold Bötzel	Long jump F46	6.25	6
Horst Beyer	Shot put F42	11.26	8
Detlef Eckert	Shot put F42	11.11	10
Roberto Simonazzi	Shot put F42	11.50	7
Jörg Frischmann	Shot put F44	13.51	3rd place, bronze medalist(s)
Hans Ulrich Prill	Shot put F52	6.15	9
Hubertus Brauner	Shot put F54	7.09	11
Ulrich Iser	Shot put F55	9.64	3rd place, bronze medalist(s)
Gerhard Wies	Shot put F56	10.64	3rd place, bronze medalist(s)
Siegmund Hegeholz	Discus throw F11	34.47	7
Siegmund Turteltaube	Discus throw F11	35.45 SB	6
Andreas Müller	Discus throw F34	33.15	2nd place, silver medalist(s)
Steffen Wiebke	Discus throw F34	22.21	8
Oliver Frerichs	Discus throw F38	29.23	6
Mirko Kuhlmey	Discus throw F38	27.39 SB	7
Horst Beyer	Discus throw F42	40.77	6
Klaus Kulla	Discus throw F42	35.80	13
Roberto Simonazzi	Discus throw F42	36.20	12
Hans Ulrich Prill	Discus throw F52	12.15 SB	6
Reinhard Berner	Discus throw F54	20.59 SB	12
Hubertus Brauner	Discus throw F54	21.55	10
Ulrich Iser	Discus throw F55	24.77	11
Gerhard Wies	Discus throw F56	29.81	6
Rayk Haucke	Javelin throw F11	41.83	2nd place, silver medalist(s)
Siegmund Hegeholz	Javelin throw F11	44.64	1st place, gold medalist(s)
Thomas Validis	Javelin throw F13	46.30	8
Sven Conrad	Javelin throw F37	39.85 SB	5
Jörg Frischmann	Javelin throw F44	50.18	3rd place, bronze medalist(s)
Georg Meyer	Javelin throw F46	29.67	8
Jörg Schiedek	Javelin throw F46	47.10	3rd place, bronze medalist(s)
Sven Solbrig	Javelin throw F46	51.87 SB	1st place, gold medalist(s)
Hans Ulrich Prill	Javelin throw F52	11.88	8
Reinhard Berner	Javelin throw F54	20.81 SB	6
Ulrich Iser	Javelin throw F55	24.56	6
Gerhard Wies	Javelin throw F56	27.84 SB	4

Combined event – Pentathlon

Athlete	Category	Event	LJ (P11/12/42) SP (P58)	JT (P11/12/58) SP (P42)	100 m (P11/12) JT (P42) 200 m (P 58)	DT	1500 m (P11/P12/58) HJ (P42)	Final	Rank
Rayk Haucke	P11	Result	5.25	44.33	12.51	27.51	4:58.44	2475	3rd place, bronze medalist(s)
Rayk Haucke	P11	Points	431	505	554	416	569	2475	3rd place, bronze medalist(s)
Holger Geffers	P12	Result	5.31	40.04	11.93	27.00	4:48.88	2582 SB	7
Holger Geffers	P12	Points	443	443	665	406	625	2582 SB	7
Ingo Geffers	P12	Result	5.22	38.53	12.08	DNS	DNF		
Ingo Geffers	P12	Points	425	421	635	0	DNF		
Jörg Trippen-Hilgers	P12	Result	6.62	43.64	11.88	36.08	6:15.48	2684	5
Jörg Trippen-Hilgers	P12	Points	725	495	675	585	204	2684	5
Horst Beyer	P42	Result	4.31	11.67	36.55	41.46	1.55	4577	3rd place, bronze medalist(s)
Horst Beyer	P42	Points	1083	1393	408	1170	523	4577	3rd place, bronze medalist(s)
Roberto Simonazzi	P42	Result	NM	11.55	37.39	35.29	DNS	DNF	
Roberto Simonazzi	P42	Points	0	1364	452	775	0	DNF	
Reinhard Berner	P58	Result	6.94	19.31	34.61	20.05	4:00.98	4228	7
Reinhard Berner	P58	Points	817	764	819	881	947	4228	7
Hubertus Brauner	P58	Result	6.94	19.09	37.34	21.10	4:31.14	3913	8
Hubertus Brauner	P58	Points	817	753	666	939	738	3913	8

Women
Track & road events

Athlete	Event	Heat		Semifinal		Final	
Athlete	Event	Result	Rank	Result	Rank	Result	Rank
Cornelia Teubner	100 m T36	—N/a				16.60	5
Isabelle Foerder	100 m T37	—N/a				14.42 SB	2nd place, silver medalist(s)
Carmen Storch	100 m T37	—N/a				15.98	6
Astrid Höfte	100 m T44	—N/a				14.72 SB	4
Stefanie Krebs	100 m T44	—N/a				16.49	9
Sabine Wagner	100 m T44	—N/a				14.05 SB	2nd place, silver medalist(s)
Catherine Bader-Bille	100 m T46						
Petra Quade	100 m T46						
Jessica Sachse	100 m T46						
Annette Völlner	100 m T52						
Yvonne Sehmisch	100 m T54						
Cornelia Teubner	200 m T36						
Isabelle Foerder	200 m T38						
Carmen Storch	200 m T38						
Astrid Höfte	200 m T44						
Stefanie Krebs	200 m T44						
Sabine Wagner	200 m T44						
Jessica Sachse	200 m T46						
Annette Völlner	200 m T52						
Yvonne Sehmisch	200 m T54						
Annette Völlner	400 m T52						
Yvonne Sehmisch	400 m T54						
Lily Anggreny	800 m T54						
Claudia Meier	1500 m T12						
Lily Anggreny	1500 m T54						
Claudia Meier	5000 m T12						
Lily Anggreny	5000 m T54						
Lily Anggreny	Marathon T54						

Field events

Athlete	Event	Final	
Athlete	Event	Distance	Position
Catherine Bader-Bille	Long jump F46		
Petra Quade	Long jump F46		
Siena Christen	Shot put F12		
Simona Kegel	Shot put F37		
Michaela Daamen	Shot put F44		
Britta Jänicke	Shot put F46		
Annett Kadner	Shot put F46		
Sabine Utheß	Shot put F46		
Marianne Buggenhagen	Shot put F55		
Martina Willing	Shot put F57		
Birgit Pohl	Shot put F33/F34		
Siena Christen	Discus throw F12		
Michaela Daamen	Discus throw F46		
Britta Jänicke	Discus throw F46		
Sabine Utheß	Discus throw F46		
Marianne Buggenhagen	Discus throw F58		
Martina Willing	Discus throw F58		
Birgit Pohl	Discus throw F33/F34		
Annett Kadner	Javelin throw F46		
Jessica Sachse	Javelin throw F46		
Sabine Utheß	Javelin throw F46		
Marianne Buggenhagen	Javelin throw F58		
Martina Willing	Javelin throw F58		

== See also ==
- Germany at the Paralympics
- Germany at the 2000 Summer Olympics

== Bibliography ==
- International Paralympic Committee (2000). "Appendix C: Athlete Numbers - By Delegation". Sydney 2000 Paralympic Games Post Games Report. Sydney.
