= Germany at the 2004 Summer Paralympics =

- IPC code: GER
- NPC: National Paralympic Committee Germany
- Website: www.dbs-npc.de (in German)

in Athens
- Competitors: 212 in 17 sports
- Medals Ranked 8th: Gold 19 Silver 28 Bronze 31 Total 78

Summer Paralympics appearances (overview)
- 1960; 1964; 1968; 1972; 1976; 1980; 1984; 1988; 1992; 1996; 2000; 2004; 2008; 2012; 2016; 2020; 2024

Other related appearances
- East Germany (1984)

Germany competed at the 2004 Summer Paralympics in Athens, Greece. The team included 212 athletes—140 men and 72 women. German competitors won 78 medals, 19 gold, 28 silver and 31 bronze, to finish 8th in the medal table.

== Medallists ==
Medal	Name	Sport	Event
Gold	Mario Oehme	Archery	Men's W2
Gold	Wojtek Czyz	Athletics	Men's 100m T42
Gold	Wojtek Czyz	Athletics	Men's 200m T42
Gold	Wojtek Czyz	Athletics	Men's long jump F42
Gold	Marianne Buggenhagen	Athletics	Women's shot put F54/55
Gold	Michael Teuber	Cycling	Men's bicycle road race/time trial LC4
Gold	Michael Teuber	Cycling	Men's bicycle 3 km individual pursuit LC4
Gold	Susann Schuetzel	Judo	Women's 52 kg
Gold	Ramona Brussig	Judo	Women's 57 kg
Gold	Manuela Schmermund	Shooting	Women's air rifle standing SH1
Gold	Christoph Burkard	Swimming	Men's 400m freestyle S8
Gold	Daniel Clausner	Swimming	Men's 100m breaststroke SB13
Gold	Daniel Clausner	Swimming	Men's 200m individual medley SM13
Gold	Kirsten Bruhn	Swimming	Women's 100m breaststroke SB5
Gold	Annke Conradi	Swimming	Women's 50m backstroke S3
Gold	Holger Nikelis	Table tennis	Men's singles class 1
Gold	Daniel Arnold	Table tennis	Men's singles class 6
Gold	Daniel Arnold; Dieter Meyer; Rainer Schmidt; Jochen Wollmert	Table tennis	Men's teams class 6-7
Gold	Monika Sikora Weinmann	Table tennis	Women's singles class 4
Silver	Matthias Schroeder	Athletics	Men's 200m T12
Silver	Stefan Strobel	Athletics	Men's marathon T51
Silver	Thomas Loosch	Athletics	Men's shot put F38
Silver	Lutz Langer	Athletics	Men's shot put F40
Silver	Gerhard Wies	Athletics	Men's shot put F56
Silver	Rico Glagla	Athletics	Men's discus throw F52
Silver	Siegmund Hegeholz	Athletics	Men's javelin throw F11
Silver	Isabelle Foerder	Athletics	Women's 100m T37
Silver	Christine Wolf	Athletics	Women's long jump F42
Silver	Claudia Biene	Athletics	Women's discus throw F42-46
Silver	Marianne Buggenhagen	Athletics	Women's discus throw F54/55
Silver	Tobias Graf	Cycling	Men's bicycle 3 km individual pursuit LC3
Silver	Bianca Vogel	Equestrian	Mixed individual championship dressage grade III
Silver	Hannelore Brenner	Equestrian	Mixed individual freestyle dressage grade II
Silver	Bettina Eistel	Equestrian	Mixed individual freestyle dressage grade III
Silver	Bettina Eistel; Britta Naepel; Bianca Vogel	Equestrian	Mixed team dressage
Silver	Silke Huetter	Judo	Women's 63 kg
Silver	Roland Hartmann	Shooting	Mixed free pistol SH1
Silver	Christopher Kueken	Swimming	Men's 400m freestyle S8
Silver	Kirsten Bruhn	Swimming	Women's 50m freestyle S7
Silver	Natalie Ball	Swimming	Women's 50m freestyle S11
Silver	Annke Conradi	Swimming	Women's 100m freestyle S3
Silver	Natalie Ball	Swimming	Women's 100m freestyle S11
Silver	Claudia Hengst	Swimming	Women's 400m freestyle S10
Silver	Natalie Ball	Swimming	Women's 100m breaststroke SB11
Silver	Kirsten Bruhn	Swimming	Women's 100m backstroke S7
Silver	Rainer Schmidt	Table tennis	Men's singles class 6
Silver	Jochen Wollmert	Table tennis	Men's singles class 7
Bronze	Matthias Schroeder	Athletics	Men's 100m T12
Bronze	Heinrich Popow	Athletics	Men's 100m T42
Bronze	Heinrich Popow	Athletics	Men's 200m T42
Bronze	Heinrich Popow	Athletics	Men's long jump F42
Bronze	Rico Glagla	Athletics	Men's shot put F52
Bronze	Thomas Loosch	Athletics	Men's discus throw F38
Bronze	Isabelle Foerder	Athletics	Women's 200m T37
Bronze	Martina Willing	Athletics	Women's shot put F56-58
Bronze	Andrea Hegen	Athletics	Women's javelin throw F42-46
Bronze	Erich Winkler	Cycling	Men's bicycle road race/time trial LC4
Bronze	Tobias Graf	Cycling	Men's bicycle 1 km time trial LC1-4
Bronze	Hans Peter Beier	Cycling	Men's bicycle 3 km individual pursuit LC4
Bronze	Bettina Eistel	Equestrian	Mixed individual championship dressage grade III
Bronze	Sebastian Junk	Judo	Men's 81 kg
Bronze	Astrid Arndt	Judo	Women's 48 kg
Bronze	Beate Bischler	Judo	Women's +70 kg
Bronze	Sabine Brogle	Shooting	Women's air rifle standing SH1
Bronze	Manuela Schmermund	Shooting	Women's sport rifle 3x20 SH1
Bronze	Daniel Clausner	Swimming	Men's 100m freestyle S13
Bronze	Swen Michaelis	Swimming	Men's 200m individual medley SM6
Bronze	Annke Conradi	Swimming	Women's 50m freestyle S3
Bronze	Kirsten Bruhn	Swimming	Women's 100m freestyle S7
Bronze	Christiane Reppe	Swimming	Women's 100m freestyle S9
Bronze	Christiane Reppe	Swimming	Women's 400m freestyle S9
Bronze	Claudia Hengst	Swimming	Women's 100m butterfly S10
Bronze	Maria Goetze	Swimming	Women's 200m individual medley SM6
Bronze	Claudia Hengst	Swimming	Women's 200m individual medley SM10
Bronze	Natalie Ball	Swimming	Women's 200m individual medley SM11
Bronze	Walter Kilger	Table tennis	Men's singles class 1
Bronze	Thorsten Gruenkemeyer; Walter Kilger; Holger Nikelis; Otto Vilsmaier	Table tennis	Men's team class 1-2
Bronze	Christiane Pape	Table tennis	Women's singles class 4

== Sports ==
=== Archery ===
==== Men ====
Athlete	Event	Ranking round		Round of 32	Round of 16	Quarterfinals	Semifinals	Finals	
Athlete	Event	Score	Seed	Opposition score	Opposition score	Opposition score	Opposition score	Opposition score	Rank
Eric Hassberg	Men's individual W1	606	7	—N/a	Cross (USA); W 150-150 #1	Groenberg (SWE); L 102-102 #2	did not advance		
Hermann Nortman	Men's individual W2	593	17	Stone (USA); L 145-147	did not advance				
Mario Oehme	Men's individual W2	625	3	Kacina (SVK); W 159-135	Marin (ESP); W 150-139	Sidik (MAS); W 100-100 #3	de Pellegrin (ITA); W 98-97	Jung (KOR); W 108-95	1st place, gold medalist(s)
Eric Hassberg; Hermann Nortmann; Mario Oehme	Men's team	1824	6	—N/a	Ukraine (UKR); L 221-229	did not advance			

1 - Eric Hassberg's round of 16 was decided by additional arrows against Aaron Cross. He won 9:8

2 - Eric Hassberg's quarterfinal was decided by additional arrows against Anders Groenberg. He lost 9:9, 8:8, 8:X.

3 - Mario Oehme's quarterfinal was decided by additional arrows against Muhamad Salam Sidik. He won 8:5.

==== Women ====
Athlete	Event	Ranking round		Round of 32	Round of 16	Quarterfinals	Semifinals	Finals	
Athlete	Event	Score	Seed	Opposition score	Opposition score	Opposition score	Opposition score	Opposition score	Rank
Maria Droste	Women's individual W1/W2	544	10	—N/a	Terletska (UKR); L 120-141	did not advance			

=== Athletics ===
==== Men's track ====
Athlete	Class	Event	Heats		Semifinal		Final	
Athlete	Class	Event	Result	Rank	Result	Rank	Result	Rank
Alhassane Balde	T54	800m	1:39.21	16	did not advance			
Alhassane Balde	T54	1500m	3:08.33	20 Q	3:09.30	16	did not advance	
Max Bergmann	T13	800m	—N/a				2:04.98	7
Max Bergmann	T13	1500m	4:03.84	7 Q	—N/a		4:13.80	12
Max Bergmann	T13	5000m	—N/a				16:04.99	5
Ralph Brunner	T51-54	Marathon	—N/a				1:35:39	12
Ralph Brunner	T54	800m	1:36.54	8	did not advance			
Ralph Brunner	T54	1500m	3:05.46	12 Q	3:05.10	5 q	3:06.04	6
Ralph Brunner	T54	5000m	10:25.74	7 Q	—N/a		10:24.82	4
Ralph Brunner	T54	10000m	21:48.58	17	did not advance			
Sebastian Cleem	T54	100m	14.98	11 q	15.05	12	did not advance	
Sebastian Cleem	T54	200m	25.95	7 q	—N/a		26.08	5
Wojtek Czyz	T42	100m	—N/a				12.51 PR	1st place, gold medalist(s)
Wojtek Czyz	T42	200m	—N/a				26.18 WR	1st place, gold medalist(s)
Marcus Ehm	T44	100m	12.15	5 Q	—N/a		11.73	5
Marcus Ehm	T44	200m	24.69	8 q	—N/a		23.71	6
Marcus Ehm	T44	400m	54.41	4 Q	—N/a		54.90	6
Robert Figl	T51-54	Marathon	—N/a				1:45:11	22
Robert Figl	T54	800m	1:35.85	5 q	—N/a		1:33.03	8
Robert Figl	T54	1500m	3:00.63	3 Q	DNF		did not advance	
Michael Haraem	T42	100m	—N/a				13.60	6
Michael Haraem	T42	200m	—N/a				27.10	4
Thorsten Oppold	T51-54	Marathon	—N/a				3:27.23	4
Heinrich Popow	T42	100m	—N/a				13.00	3rd place, bronze medalist(s)
Heinrich Popow	T42	200m	—N/a				27.10	3rd place, bronze medalist(s)
Matthias Schroeder	T12	100m	11.15	3 Q	10.91	2 Q	11.00	3rd place, bronze medalist(s)
Matthias Schroeder	T12	200m	22.23	2 Q	21.74	1 Q	21.91	2nd place, silver medalist(s)
Stefan Strobel	T51	200m	—N/a				43.07	6
Stefan Strobel	T51-54	Marathon	—N/a				2:57:50	2nd place, silver medalist(s)
Thomas Ulbricht	T12	400m	52.57	5 Q	52.68	5 B	52.36	1
Jens Wiegmann	T37	200m	26.62	13	did not advance			
Rayk Haucke; Matthias Schroeder; Joerg Trippen; Thomas Ulbricht	T11-13	4 × 100 m relay	46.57	7	did not advance			
Alhassane Balde; Reinhard Berner; Sebastian Cleem; Robert Figl	T53-54	4 × 100 m relay	54.45	5	did not advance			
Alhassane Balde; Reinhard Berner; Sebastian Cleem; Robert Figl	T53-54	4 × 400 m relay	3:26.66	9	did not advance			

==== Men's field ====
Athlete	Class	Event	Final		
Athlete	Class	Event	Result	Points	Rank
Reinhard Berner	P54-58	Pentathlon	4156		11
Reinhold Boetzel	F44/46	High jump	1.75	-	9
Reinhold Boetzel	F46	Long jump	5.89	-	9
Hubertus Brauner	F53	Shot put	8.23	-	7
Hubertus Brauner	F54	Discus	19.73	-	11
Wojtek Czyz	F42	Long jump	6.23 WR	-	1st place, gold medalist(s)
Jörg Frischmann	F44/46	Shot put	14.48	996	4
Rico Glagla	F52	Discus	16.85	-	2nd place, silver medalist(s)
Rico Glagla	F52	Shot put	8.30	-	3rd place, bronze medalist(s)
Rico Glagla	F52-53	Javelin	15.06	943	7
Rayk Haucke	F11	Javelin	33.60	-	7
Siegmund Hegeholz	F11	Javelin	45.87	-	2nd place, silver medalist(s)
Ulrich Iser	F55	Discus	25.57	-	10
Ulrich Iser	F55-56	Javelin	DNS		
Ulrich Iser	F56	Shot put	10.03	-	10
Lutz Langer	F40	Shot put	9.67	-	2nd place, silver medalist(s)
Thomas Loosch	F36/38	Javelin	50.89	-	4
Thomas Loosch	F38	Discus	41.19	-	3rd place, bronze medalist(s)
Thomas Loosch	F38	Shot put	14.54	-	2nd place, silver medalist(s)
Heinrich Popow	F42	High jump	1.65	-	4
Heinrich Popow	F42	Long jump	5.43	-	3rd place, bronze medalist(s)
Hans-Ulrich Prill	F52	Shot put	7.01	-	8
Hans-Ulrich Prill	F52-53	Javelin	12.25	767	15
Matthias Schroeder	F12	Long jump	6.83	-	6
Rainer Schwinden	F40	Shot put	8.55	-	6
Ulrich Spengler	F40	Shot put	8.85	-	4
Joerg Trippen	F12	Long jump	6.37	-	13
Joerg Trippen	P12	Pentathlon	DNF		
Thomas Validis	F12	Javelin	48.74	-	6
Jens Wiegmann	F36-38	Long jump	5.19	897	9
Gerhard Wies	F55-56	Javelin	26.03	812	15
Gerhard Wies	F56	Discus	29.96	-	7
Gerhard Wies	F56	Shot put	11.29	-	2nd place, silver medalist(s)

==== Women's track ====
Athlete	Class	Event	Heats		Semifinal		Final	
Athlete	Class	Event	Result	Rank	Result	Rank	Result	Rank
Maren Bossmeyer	T11	100m	13.80	7 Q	14.26	6 B	14.52	1
Maren Bossmeyer	T11	200m	29.70	7 Q	30.45	8 B	30.03	3
Isabelle Foerder	T37	100m	—N/a				14.64	2nd place, silver medalist(s)
Isabelle Foerder	T37	200m	—N/a				30.76	3rd place, bronze medalist(s)
Annalena Knors	T12	100m	13.49	9 Q	13.48	8 B	13.49	4
Annalena Knors	T12	200m	27.42	4 q	27.35	5 B	27.63	2
Katrin Mueller	T13	100m	—N/a				13.17	4
Katrin Mueller	T13	400m	—N/a				1:00.43	4
Jessica Sachse	T46	100m	13.18	5 Q	—N/a		13.13	7
Yvonne Sehmisch	T54	100m	17.37	5 Q	—N/a		17.35	4
Yvonne Sehmisch	T54	200m	31.48	6 q	—N/a		31.17	6
Sabine Wagner	T46	100m	14.59	12	did not advance			
Sabine Wagner	T46	200m	28.95	11	did not advance			

==== Women's field ====
Athlete	Class	Event	Final		
Athlete	Class	Event	Result	Points	Rank
Claudia Biene	F42	Long jump	DNS		
Claudia Biene	F42-46	Discus	27.11	1360	2nd place, silver medalist(s)
Claudia Biene	F42-46	Javelin	24.54	884	7
Marianne Buggenhagen	F54/55	Discus	27.57 WR	1078	2nd place, silver medalist(s)
Marianne Buggenhagen	F54/55	Javelin	19.34	940	5
Marianne Buggenhagen	F54/55	Shot put	9.06 WR	1045	1st place, gold medalist(s)
Siena Christen	F12	Shot put	10.81	-	5
Siena Christen	F13	Discus	34.90	-	7
Michaela Daamen	F42-46	Discus	35.58	1099	7
Michaela Daamen	F42-46	Shot put	11.04	1029	8
Andrea Hegen	F42-46	Javelin	36.67	988	3rd place, bronze medalist(s)
Astrid Hoefte	F44/46	Long jump	3.84	955	10
Petra Hoemmen	F40	Discus	17.61	-	5
Petra Hoemmen	F40	Javelin	14.07	-	5
Petra Hoemmen	F40	Shot put	6.64	-	5
Annalena Knors	F12	Long jump	4.77	-	9
Salome Kretz	F42	Long jump	2.98	-	9
Katrin Laborenz	F44/46	Long jump	4.20	1044	7
Karen Mueller	F40	Discus	18.74	-	4
Karen Mueller	F40	Shot put	6.07	-	6
Katrin Mueller	F13	Long jump	4.91	-	5
Birgit Pohl	F32-34/52/53	Discus	20.52	1000	5
Birgit Pohl	F32-34/52/53	Javelin	15.55	960	8
Birgit Pohl	F32-34/52/53	Shot put	8.54	1104	5
Jessica Sachse	F42-46	Javelin	25.15	677	11
Sabine Uthess	F42-46	Discus	27.35	715	14
Sabine Uthess	F42-46	Shot put	10.74	948	10
Sabine Wagner	F44/46	Long jump	4.28	1064	5
Martina Willing	F56-58	Discus	22.39	1049	4
Martina Willing	F56-58	Javelin	21.88	938	6
Martina Willing	F56-58	Shot put	7.94	1113	3rd place, bronze medalist(s)
Christine Wolf	F42	Long jump	3.53	-	2nd place, silver medalist(s)

=== Cycling ===
==== Men's road ====
Athlete	Event	Time	Rank
Hans Peter Beier	Men's road race / time trial LC4	-	6
Guenter Brechtel	Men's road race / time trial LC1	2:40:14	9
Tobias Graf	Men's road race / time trial LC3	-	7
Andreas Hillers	Men's tricycle road race CP div 1/2	53:05	6
Andreas Hillers	Men's handcycle time trial CP div 1/2	10:50.31	6
Andreas Kiemes	Men's handcycle road race HC div A	1:13.42	4
Andreas Kiemes	Men's handcycle time trial HC div A	13:37.73	5
Klaus Lungershausen	Men's road race / time trial CP div 4	1:47:13	4
Walter Marquardt	Men's road race / time trial LC1	2:39:32	8
Gotty Mueller	Men's road race / time trial LC2	2:17:50	6
Guenter Schambeck	Men's road race / time trial LC1	-	11
Florian Sitzmann	Men's handcycle road race HC div B/C	DNF	
Florian Sitzmann	Men's handcycle time trial HC div B/C	22:32.68	13
Michael Teuber	Men's road race / time trial LC4	-	1st place, gold medalist(s)
Erich Winkler	Men's road race / time trial LC4	-	3rd place, bronze medalist(s)
Achim Moll; Andre Kalfack	Men's road race / time trial tandem B1-3	-	8

==== Men's track (individual) ====
Athlete	Event	Qualification		1st round	Final	
Athlete	Event	Time	Rank	Time	Opposition Time	Rank
Hans Peter Beier	Men's 1km time trial LC1-4	—N/a			1:15.16	21
Hans Peter Beier	Men's individual pursuit LC4	4:46.37	4	—N/a	Dabernig (AUT); W 4:32.09	3rd place, bronze medalist(s)
Guenter Brechtel	Men's individual pursuit LC1	5:13.53	7	Eibeck (AUT); L OVL	did not advance	
Tobias Graf	Men's 1km time trial LC1-4	—N/a			1:09.36	3rd place, bronze medalist(s)
Tobias Graf	Men's individual pursuit LC3	4:09.91	2	Stark (CZE); W 4:07.04	Thirionet (FRA); L 4:02.90	2nd place, silver medalist(s)
Klaus Lungershausen	Men's 1km time trial CP div 3/4	—N/a			1:20.51	16
Klaus Lungershausen	Men's individual pursuit CP div 4	3:55.55	5 Q	Jirka (CZE); L 3:55.60	did not advance	
Walter Marquardt	Men's 1km time trial LC1-4	—N/a			1:13.06	15
Walter Marquardt	Men's individual pursuit LC1	5:21.28	11	did not advance		
Gotty Mueller	Men's individual pursuit LC2	5:14.55	4	Williams (USA); L 5:13.22	did not advance	
Guenter Schambeck	Men's 1km time trial LC1-4	—N/a			1:14.36	19
Guenter Schambeck	Men's individual pursuit LC1	5:12.47	6	Triboli (ITA); L OVL	did not advance	
Michael Teuber	Men's 1km time trial LC1-4	—N/a			1:09.65	4
Michael Teuber	Men's individual pursuit LC4	4:17.91 PR	1	N/A	Méndez (ESP); W	1st place, gold medalist(s)
Erich Winkler	Men's 1km time trial LC1-4	—N/a			1:17.01	27

==== Men's track (pairs/teams) ====
Athlete	Event	Ranking Round		Quarterfinals		Semifinals		Final	
Athlete	Event	Time	Rank	Time	Rank	Time	Rank	Opposition Time	Rank
Torsten Goliasch; Achim Moll (pilot)	Men's 1km time trial tandem B1-3	—N/a						1:07.82	11
Torsten Goliasch; Achim Moll (pilot)	Men's sprint tandem B1-3	11.108	6	Janovjak (SVK); Petrovic (SVK)	L 0-2	—N/a		5th-8th place matches Storey (GBR); Gordon (GBR); W 12.047	5
Guenter Brechtel; Tobias Graf; Gotty Mueller	Men's team sprint LC1-4/CP 3/4	57.621	4	Czech Republic (CZE); W 56.939	3	—N/a		France (FRA); L 56.805	4

==== Women's road ====
Athlete	Event	Time	Rank
Michaela Fuchs; Eva Fuenfgeld	Women's road race / time trial tandem B1-3	2:06:52	6

==== Women's track ====
Athlete	Event	Qualification		1st round		Final	
Athlete	Event	Time	Rank	Time	Rank	Opposition Time	Rank
Eva Fuenfgeld; Michaela Fuchs	Women's 1km time trial tandem B1-3	—N/a				1:16.13	7
Eva Fuenfgeld; Michaela Fuchs	Women's individual pursuit tandem B1-3	3:49.10	5	Hartwell (NOR); Gravvold (NOR); L 3:47.92	5	did not advance	

=== Equestrian ===
==== Individual ====
Athlete	Event	Total	
Athlete	Event	Score	Rank
Hannelore Brenner	Individual championship test grade II	DNS	
Hannelore Brenner	Individual championship test grade II	76.056	2nd place, silver medalist(s)
Bettina Eistel	Individual championship test grade III	71.120	3rd place, bronze medalist(s)
Bettina Eistel	Individual freestyle test grade III	77.778	2nd place, silver medalist(s)
Britta Naepel	Individual championship test grade II	67.091	8
Britta Naepel	Individual freestyle test grade II	72.167	7
Angelika Trabert	Individual championship test grade II	68.545	5
Angelika Trabert	Individual freestyle test grade II	71.000	9
Bianca Vogel	Individual championship test grade III	72.240	2nd place, silver medalist(s)
Bianca Vogel	Individual freestyle test grade III	54.056	16

==== Team ====
Athlete	Event	Total	
Athlete	Event	Total	Rank
Bettina Eistel; Britta Naepel; Bianca Vogel	Team	417.109	2nd place, silver medalist(s)

=== Goalball ===
==== Men's tournament ====
The men's goalball team didn't win any medals: they were 10th out of 12 teams.

==== Players ====
- Thomas Betzl
- Michael Breidbach
- Johann Demmelhuber
- Mathias Koehler
- Steffen Lehmann
- Matthias Schmidt

==== Results ====
Game	Match	Score	Rank
1	Germany vs. Denmark (DEN)	3 - 9	5
2	Germany vs. Sweden (SWE)	1 - 3	5
3	Germany vs. United States (USA)	2 - 7	5
4	Germany vs. Canada (CAN)	5 - 4	5
5	Germany vs. Greece (GRE)	13 - 3	5
9th-10th classification	Germany vs. Lithuania (LTU)	4 - 6	10

==== Women's tournament ====
The women's goalball team didn't win any medals. They were 6th out of 8 teams.

==== Players ====
- Cornelia Dietz
- Ina Fischer
- Veronika Matthieu
- Christiane Moeller
- Christa Pekx
- Regina Vollbrecht

==== Results ====
Game	Match	Score	Rank
1	Germany vs. Canada (CAN)	0 - 3	6
2	Germany vs. United States (USA)	0 - 2	6
3	Germany vs. Japan (JPN)	3 - 6	6
4	Germany vs. Finland (FIN)	1 - 5	6
5	Germany vs. Netherlands (NED)	0 - 4	6
6	Germany vs. Brazil (BRA)	4 - 1	6
7	Germany vs. Greece (GRE)	2 - 0	6

=== Judo ===
==== Men ====
Athlete	Event	Preliminary	Quarterfinals	Semifinals	Repechage round 1	Repechage round 2	Final/ Bronze medal contest
Athlete	Event	Opposition Result	Opposition Result	Opposition Result	Opposition Result	Opposition Result	Opposition Result
Thomas Dahmen	Men's 100kg	Montero (VEN); W 0020-0000C	Shneyderman (RUS); W 1000-0000	Men (CHN); L 0001S-1001S	—N/a		Le Meaux (FRA); L 0000-1000
Sebastian Junk	Men's 81kg	Ye (CHN); W 0010-0001	Kato (JPN); L 0000-1010	—N/a		Pominov (UKR); W 1000-0001	Vlasov (RUS); W 1000-0000 (bronze)
Matthias Krieger	Men's 73kg	Doyle (IRL); W 0099-0099	Rollo (FRA); W 0002S–1001S	Amaral (BRA); L 0000-1000	—N/a		Asakereh (IRI); L 0000-0210
Martin Osewald	Men's +100kg	Taurines (FRA); W 0130S-0001	Campos Ariza (ESP); L 0000S-0011	—N/a	Torres Pompa (CUB); L 0000-0210	did not advance	

==== Women ====
Athlete	Event	Quarterfinals	Semifinals	Repechage	Final/ Bronze medal contest
Athlete	Event	Opposition Result	Opposition Result	Opposition Result	Opposition Result
Astrid Arndt	Women's 48kg	Akatsuka (JPN); W 1000-0000	Cardoso (BRA); L 0000–0100	—N/a	Guo (CHN); W 1000-0000 (bronze)
Beate Bischler	Women's +70kg	—N/a	Xue (CHN); L 0000-0200	—N/a	Ivanova (RUS); W 0210-0000 (bronze)
Ramona Brussig	Women's 57kg	Bye	Lei (CHN); W 1000-0000	—N/a	Payno (ESP); W 1000-0000 (gold)
Silke Huettler	Women's 63kg	Merenciano (ESP); W 0200-0010	Ingram (GBR); W 1000-0000	—N/a	Kazakova (RUS); L 0000-1000 (silver)
Susann Schuetzel	Women's 52kg	Allan (AUS); W 1000-0000	da Silva (BRA); W 1000-0000	—N/a	Aurières (FRA); W 1021-0000 (gold)

=== Powerlifting ===
Athlete	Event	Result	Rank
Mario Hochberg	100kg	NMR	
Bernd Vogel	90kg	212.5	5

=== Shooting ===
==== Men ====
Athlete	Event	Qualification		Final		
Athlete	Event	Score	Rank	Score	Total	Rank
Alfred Beringer	Mixed 10m air rifle prone SH1	599	7 Q	104	703	5
Alfred Beringer	Mixed 50m rifle prone SH1	580	18	did not advance		
Franz Falke	Mixed 10m air rifle prone SH1	596	22	did not advance		
Franz Falke	Mixed 50m rifle prone SH1	586	9	did not advance		
Bernhard Fendt	Mixed 10m air rifle prone SH1	598	9	did not advance		
Bernhard Fendt	Mixed 50m rifle prone SH1	568	32	did not advance		
Norbert Gau	Men's 10m air rifle standing SH1	583	10	did not advance		
Norbert Gau	Men's 50m rifle three positions SH1	1104	18	did not advance		
Roland Hartmann	Men's 10m air pistol SH1	555	13	did not advance		
Roland Hartmann	Mixed 25m pistol SH1	519	23	did not advance		
Roland Hartmann	Mixed 50m pistol SH1	535	1 Q	85.8	620.8	2nd place, silver medalist(s)
Kai Uwe Liebehenz	Men's 10m air pistol SH1	554	14	did not advance		
Kai Uwe Liebehenz	Mixed 50m pistol SH1	524	7 Q	93.9	617.9	4
Josef Neumaier	Men's 10m air rifle standing SH1	567	18	did not advance		
Josef Neumaier	Men's 50m rifle three positions	1129	7 Q	92.2	1221.2	7
Joachim Schaefer	Men's 10m air rifle standing SH1	579	14	did not advance		
Joachim Schaefer	Men's 50m rifle three positions SH1	1111	15	did not advance		
Wolfgang Stoeckl	Mixed 10m air rifle prone SH2	597	12	did not advance		
Wolfgang Stoeckl	Mixed 10m air rifle standing SH2	594	10	did not advance		
Frank Wunderlich	Men's 10m air pistol SH1	540	31	did not advance		

==== Women ====
Athlete	Event	Qualification		Final		
Athlete	Event	Score	Rank	Score	Total	Rank
Sabine Brogle	Women's 10m air rifle standing SH1	386	6 Q	102.6	488.6	3rd place, bronze medalist(s)
Sabine Brogle	Women's 50m rifle three positions SH1	543	7 Q	94.8	637.8	7
Christiane Latzke	Mixed 10m air rifle prone SH2	598	10	did not advance		
Christiane Latzke	Mixed 10m air rifle standing SH2	598	7 Q	701.2	103.2	6
Manuela Schmermund	Women's 10m air rifle standing SH1	392	1 Q	101	493	1st place, gold medalist(s)
Manuela Schmermund	Women's 50m rifle three positions SH1	557	5 Q	96.1	653.1	3rd place, bronze medalist(s)
Christine Stoeckl	Women's 10m air pistol SH1	357	10	did not advance		
Christine Stoeckl	Mixed 25m pistol SH1	537	21	did not advance		

=== Swimming ===
==== Men ====
Athlete	Class	Event	Heats		Final	
Athlete	Class	Event	Result	Rank	Result	Rank
Christoph Burkard	S8	100m freestyle	1:05.69	6 Q	1:05.59	6
Christoph Burkard	S8	400m freestyle	4:55.64	2 Q	4:40.30 WR	1st place, gold medalist(s)
Christoph Burkard	SB7	100m breaststroke	1:28.97	6 Q	1:29.49	6
Christoph Burkard	SM8	200m individual medley	N/A		2:42.53	7
Daniel Clausner	S13	50m freestyle	25.95	3 Q	25.77	4
Daniel Clausner	S13	100m freestyle	58.01	3 Q	56.69	3rd place, bronze medalist(s)
Daniel Clausner	S13	400m freestyle	4:47.00	5 Q	4:42.37	5
Daniel Clausner	S13	100m backstroke	1:09.24	4 Q	1:08.38	4
Daniel Clausner	SB13	100m breaststroke	1:18.26	7 Q	1:12.09	1st place, gold medalist(s)
Daniel Clausner	SM13	200m individual medley	2:31.10	4 Q	2:24.40	1st place, gold medalist(s)
Robert Dörries	S13	400m freestyle	4:44.43	1 Q	4:41.92	4
Robert Dörries	S13	100m backstroke	1:12.73	5 Q	1:11.44	6
Christian Goldbach	S2	50m freestyle	1:20.04	9	did not advance	
Christian Goldbach	S2	100m freestyle	2:40.00	4 Q	2:40.83	6
Christian Goldbach	S2	200m freestyle	5:35.21	3 Q	5:28.96	4
Christian Goldbach	S2	50m backstroke	1:21.26	9	did not advance	
Thomas Grimm	S7	400m freestyle	5:24.72	8 Q	5:22.05	7
Thomas Grimm	SB5	100m breaststroke	1:39.77	5 Q	1:38.93	5
Thomas Grimm	SM6	200m individual medley	DSQ		did not advance	
Niels Grunenberg	SB5	100m breaststroke	1:38.87	4 Q	1:39.68	6
Andreas Hausmann	S11	100m freestyle	1:11.63	14	did not advance	
Andreas Hausmann	S11	400m freestyle	5:30.93	7 Q	5:24.53	7
Andreas Hausmann	S11	100m backstroke	1:26.72	10	did not advance	
Sebastian Iwanow	S6	50m freestyle	32.79	5 Q	32.30	5
Sebastian Iwanow	S6	100m freestyle	1:11.95	6 Q	1:11.64	6
Sebastian Iwanow	S6	400m freestyle	5:42.11	7 Q	5:38.16	5
Sebastian Iwanow	S6	100m backstroke	1:26.98	8 Q	1:28.27	8
Christopher Kueken	S8	50m freestyle	30.38	7 Q	30.24	7
Christopher Kueken	S8	100m freestyle	1:05.01	4 Q	1:03.84	4
Christopher Kueken	S8	400m freestyle	4:54.97	1 Q	4:47.66	2nd place, silver medalist(s)
Christopher Kueken	S8	100m backstroke	1:16.48	5 Q	1:15.89	5
Christopher Kueken	SM8	200m individual medley	N/A		2:53.40	8
Swen Michaelis	S6	50m freestyle	34.99	12	did not advance	
Swen Michaelis	S6	100m freestyle	1:11.95	7 Q	1:12.02	7
Swen Michaelis	S6	400m freestyle	5:36.26	5 Q	5:24.16	4
Swen Michaelis	S6	100m backstroke	1:21.46	5 Q	1:20.62	5
Swen Michaelis	SM6	200m individual medley	3:03.72	3 Q	3:03.42	3rd place, bronze medalist(s)
Christian Goldbach; Nils Grunenberg; Sebastian Iwanow; Swen Michaelis	N/A	4 x 50m freestyle relay (20pts)	3:11.25	11	did not advance	
Christoph Burkard; Sebastian Iwanow; Christopher Kueken; Swen Michaelis	N/A	4 × 100 m freestyle relay (34pts)	4:39.96	11	did not advance	
Christian Goldbach; Thomas Grimm; Nils Grunenberg; Sebastian Iwanow	N/A	4 x 50m medley relay (20pts)	3:20.88	10	did not advance	
Christoph Burkard; Thomas Grimm; Christopher Kueken; Swen Michaelis	N/A	4 × 100 m medley relay (34pts)	5:26.15	11	did not advance	

==== Women ====
Athlete	Class	Event	Heats		Final	
Athlete	Class	Event	Result	Rank	Result	Rank
Natalie Ball	S11	50m freestyle	33.84	2 Q	33.22	2nd place, silver medalist(s)
Natalie Ball	S11	100m freestyle	1:15.53	4 Q	1:12.10	1st place, gold medalist(s)
Natalie Ball	S11	100m backstroke	1:26.49	3 Q	1:25.34	4
Natalie Ball	SB11	100m breaststroke	1:34.23	2 Q	1:32.98	2nd place, silver medalist(s)
Natalie Ball	SM11	200m individual medley	N/A		3:13.15	3rd place, bronze medalist(s)
Kirsten Bruhn	S7	50m freestyle	35.52	2 Q	34.92	2nd place, silver medalist(s)
Kirsten Bruhn	S7	100m freestyle	1:15.41	1 Q	1:15.89	3rd place, bronze medalist(s)
Kirsten Bruhn	S7	400m freestyle	5:35.04	2 Q	5:39.65	4
Kirsten Bruhn	S7	100m backstroke	1:31.68	2 Q	1:29.46	2nd place, silver medalist(s)
Kirsten Bruhn	SB5	100m breaststroke	N/A		1:52.81 PR	1st place, gold medalist(s)
Annke Conradi	S3	50m freestyle	1:06.40	2 Q	1:06.60	3rd place, bronze medalist(s)
Annke Conradi	S3	100m freestyle	2:17.27	2 Q	2:16.24	2nd place, silver medalist(s)
Annke Conradi	S3	50m backstroke	N/A		1:04.88	1st place, gold medalist(s)
Annke Conradi	S4	200m freestyle	4:36.27	8 Q	4:38.03	8
Maria Goetze	S6	100m freestyle	1:25.29	4 Q	1:23.95	4
Maria Goetze	S6	400m freestyle	6:18.38	5 Q	6:09.99	4
Maria Goetze	S6	100m backstroke	1:45.49	9	did not advance	
Maria Goetze	S6	50m butterfly	47.16	11	did not advance	
Maria Goetze	SB6	100m breaststroke	1:59.94	8 Q	1:57.99	8
Maria Goetze	SM6	200m individual medley	3:31.77	4 Q	3:25.38	3rd place, bronze medalist(s)
Claudia Hengst	S10	50m freestyle	31.76	10	did not advance	
Claudia Hengst	S10	100m freestyle	1:07.71	8 Q	1:07.24	8
Claudia Hengst	S10	400m freestyle	5:02.41	3 Q	4:53.55	2nd place, silver medalist(s)
Claudia Hengst	S10	100m butterfly	1:14.91	3 Q	1:14.66	3rd place, bronze medalist(s)
Claudia Hengst	SM10	200m individual medley	2:47.73	3 Q	2:45.57	2nd place, silver medalist(s)
Claudia Knoth	S9	100m backstroke	1:20.96	9	did not advance	
Claudia Knoth	SB9	100m breaststroke	1:35.35	11	did not advance	
Christiane Reppe	S9	50m freestyle	31.72	4 Q	31.77	6
Christiane Reppe	S9	100m freestyle	1:08.13	2 Q	1:06.40	3rd place, bronze medalist(s)
Christiane Reppe	S9	400m freestyle	5:11.14	2 Q	4:59.91	3rd place, bronze medalist(s)
Christiane Reppe	SM9	200m individual medley	3:03.39	13	did not advance	
Christina Ziegler	S3	50m freestyle	1:28.66	9	did not advance	
Christina Ziegler	S3	100m freestyle	3:01.96	8 Q	3:01.40	8
Kirsten Bruhn; Annke Conradi; Maria Goetze; Christina Ziegler	N/A	4 x 50m freestyle relay (20pts)	N/A		3:50.79	6
Maria Goetze; Claudia Hengst; Claudia Knoth; Christiane Reppe	N/A	4 × 100 m freestyle relay (34pts)	N/A		4:49.50	4
Annke Conradi; Maria Goetze; Claudia Knoth; Christina Ziegler	N/A	4 x 50m medley relay (20pts)	N/A		3:44.83	6
Kirsten Bruhn; Claudia Hengst; Claudia Knoth; Christiane Reppe	N/A	4 × 100 m medley relay (34pts)	N/A		5:45.26	6

=== Table tennis ===
==== Men's singles ====
Athlete	Event	Preliminaries				Quarterfinals	Semifinals	Final / BM	
Athlete	Event	Opposition Result	Opposition Result	Opposition Result	Rank	Opposition Result	Opposition Result	Opposition Result	Rank
Daniel Arnold	Men's singles 6	Hassan (EGY); L 1-3	Kersten (NED); W 3-0	Politsis (GRE); W 3-1	1 Q	Buzin (RUS); W 3-0	Kowalski (POL); W 3-0	Schmidt (GER); W 3-0	1st place, gold medalist(s)
Werner Burkhardt	Men's singles 4	Choi (KOR); L 0-3	Lin (TPE); W 3-1	Sandoval (VEN); W 3-0	3	did not advance			
Selcuk Cetin	Men's singles 5	Jung (KOR); L 0-3	Chang (TPE); L 2-3	Krizanec (CRO); W 3-1	3	did not advance			
Heiko Gosemann	Men's singles 5	Oka (JPN); W 3-2	Lin (TPE); L 0-3	Alves (BRA); W 3-0	3	did not advance			
Thorsten Gruenkemeyer	Men's singles 2	Kim (KOR); L 0-3	Revucky (SVK); L 0-3	Reup (AUT); L 0-3	4	did not advance			
Jan Gürtler	Men's singles 3	Verger (FRA); W 3-0	Nars (EGY); L 0-3	Wolf (AUT); W 3-0	1 Q	Piñas (ESP); L 0-3	did not advance		
Walter Kilger	Men's singles 1	Haylan (ARG); W 3–1	Cho (KOR); W 3-2	Fouillen (FRA); W 3-1	1 Q	Bye	Nikelis (GER); L 3–2	Kang (KOR); W 3-2	3rd place, bronze medalist(s)
Dietmar Kober	Men's singles 4	Pechard (FRA); L 1-3	Um (KOR); W 3-1	Zhang (CHN); W 3-2	2 Q	Bye	Zhang (CHN); L 3-2	did not advance	
Thomasz Kusiak	Men's singles 6	Kowalski (POL); W 3-1	Blok (NED); L 1-3	Abbadie (FRA); L 1-3	3	did not advance			
Dieter Meyer	Men's singles 7	Messi (FRA); L 0-3	Jurasz (POL); W 3-0	Bidnyy (UKR); W 3-1	2 Q	Furlan (ITA); L 0-3	did not advance		
Holger Nikelis	Men's singles 1	Lee (KOR); L 3-3	Kaiser (HUN); W 3-1	Trujillo Yero (CUB); W 3-0	2 Q	Launonen (FIN); W 3-1	Kilger (GER); W 3-2	Lee (KOR); W 3-0	1st place, gold medalist(s)
Berthold Scheuvens	Men's singles 3	Dollmann (AUT); L 0-3	Kosco (SVK); L 0-3	Rawson (GBR); L 0-3	4	did not advance			
Rainer Schmidt	Men's singles 6	Jensen (DEN); W 3-1	Itkonen (SWE); W 3-2	Solis (CHI); W 3-0	1 Q	Hassan (EGY); W 3-1	Rosenmeier (DEN); W 3-0	Arnold (GER); L 0-3	2nd place, silver medalist(s)
Otto Vilsmaier	Men's singles 2	Sorabella (FRA); L 1-3	Riapos (SVK); W 3-2	Espindola (BRA); W 3-1	3	did not advance			
Jochen Wollmert	Men's singles 7	Qin (CHN); W 3-0	Popov (UKR); W 3-1	Loennberg (SWE); W 3-0	1 Q	Bye	Furlan (ITA); W 3-1	Messi (FRA); L 2-3	2nd place, silver medalist(s)

==== Men's teams ====
Athlete	Event	Preliminaries				Quarterfinals	Semifinals	Final / BM	
Athlete	Event	Opposition Result	Opposition Result	Opposition Result	Rank	Opposition Result	Opposition Result	Opposition Result	Rank
Thorsten Gruenkemeyer; Walter Kilger; Holger Nikelis; Otto Vilsmaier	Men's team 1-2	France (FRA); L 1-3	Austria (AUT); W 3-2	—N/a	2 Q	—N/a	South Korea (KOR); L 1-3	France (FRA); W 3-2	3rd place, bronze medalist(s)
Jan Gürtler; Berthold Scheuvens	Men's team 3	Great Britain (GBR); W 3-0	Austria (AUT); W 3-2	—N/a	1 Q	—N/a	South Korea (KOR); L 1-3	France (FRA); L 0-3	4
Werner Burkhardt; Dietmar Kober	Men's team 4	France (FRA); L 0-3	Switzerland (SUI); W 3-0	Egypt (EGY); W 3-2	2	—N/a	South Korea (KOR); L 0-3	China (CHN); L 1-3	4
Selcuk Cetin; Heiko Gosemann	Men's team 5	Czech Republic (CZE); L 0-3	Japan (JPN); W 3-2	—N/a	2 Q	Chinese Taipei (TPE); L 1-3	did not advance		
Daniel Arnold; Dieter Meyer; Rainer Schmidt; Jochen Wollmert	Men's team 6-7	Poland (POL); W 3-0	Ukraine (UKR); W 3-0	—N/a	1 Q	—N/a	Denmark (DEN); W 3-0	Poland (POL); W 3-1	1st place, gold medalist(s)

==== Women's singles ====
Athlete	Event	Preliminaries				Quarterfinals	Semifinals	Final / BM	
Athlete	Event	Opposition Result	Opposition Result	Opposition Result	Rank	Opposition Result	Opposition Result	Opposition Result	Rank
Monika Bartheidel	Women's singles 3	Kanova (SVK); L 0–3	Gay (FRA); L 1–3	—N/a	3	did not advance			
Christiane Pape	Women's singles 4	Rast (SUI); L 2-3	Pillarova (SVK); W 3-0	Riese (RSA); W 3-1	1 Q	Al Azzam (JOR); W 3-0	Zorzetto (ITA); L 2-3	Rast (SUI); W 3-1	3rd place, bronze medalist(s)
Monika Sikora Weinmann	Women's singles 4	Al Azzam (JOR); W 3-2	Gilroy (GBR); W 3-2	—N/a	1 Q	Bye	Rast (SUI); W 3-0	Zorzetto (ITA); W 3-1	1st place, gold medalist(s)
Monika Bartheidel; Christiane Pape; Monika Sikora Weinmann	Women's team 4-5	Chinese Taipei (TPE); L 0-3	Jordan (JOR); L 2-3	—N/a	3	did not advance			

=== Volleyball ===
The men's volleyball team didn't win any medals: they lost to Egypt in the bronze medal match.

==== Players ====
- Steffen Barsch
- Jens Faerber
- Robert Grylak
- Uwe Haussig
- Benjamin Paolo Oesch
- Thomas Renger
- Martin Rickmann
- Mario Scheler
- Alexander Schiffler
- Juergen Schrapp
- Siegmund Soicke
- Stefan Wischnewski

==== Results ====
Game	Match	Score	Rank
1	Germany vs. Iran (IRI)	0 - 3	2 Q
2	Germany vs. Finland (FIN)	3 - 0	2 Q
3	Germany vs. Japan (JPN)	3 - 0	2 Q
Quarterfinals	Germany vs. United States (USA)	3 - 0	W
Semifinals	Germany vs. Bosnia and Herzegovina (BIH)	0 - 3	L
Bronze medal final	Germany vs. Egypt (EGY)	2 - 3	4

=== Wheelchair basketball ===
==== Men's tournament ====
The men's basketball team didn't win any medals: they were 5th out of 12 teams.

==== Players ====
- Lars Christink
- Ben Doering
- Thomas Fischer
- Markus Haberkorn
- Sebastian Hagen Wolf
- Joerg Hilger
- Abdulqazi Karaman
- Lars Lehmann
- Martin Otto
- Joachim Peter Schermuly
- Ralf Schwarz
- Dirk Thalheim

==== Results ====
Game	Match	Score	Rank
1	Germany vs. Netherlands (NED)	63 - 52	3 Q
2	Germany vs. United States (USA)	49 - 71	3 Q
3	Germany vs. Japan (JPN)	79 - 58	3 Q
4	Germany vs. Iran (IRI)	67 - 53	3 Q
5	Germany vs. Greece (GRE)	101 - 39	3 Q
Quarterfinals	Germany vs. Australia (AUS)	60 - 79	L
5th-6th classification	Germany vs. Italy (ITA)	76 - 62	5

==== Women's tournament ====
The women's basketball team didn't win any medals: they lost to Canada in the bronze medal match.

==== Players ====
- Maren Bartlitz
- Silke Bleifuss
- Anja Janusch
- Annette Kahl
- Verena Klein
- Heidi Kriste
- Simone Kues
- Birgit Meitner
- Inga Orlowski
- Nora Schratz
- Nu Nguyen Thi
- Annika Zeyen

==== Results ====
Game	Match	Score	Rank
1	Germany vs. Canada (CAN)	46 - 59	2 Q
2	Germany vs. Japan (JPN)	50 - 36	2 Q
3	Germany vs. Mexico (MEX)	57 - 38	2 Q
Quarterfinals	Germany vs. Great Britain (GBR)	63 - 24	W
Semifinals	Germany vs. Australia (AUS)	50 - 58	L
Bronze medal final	Germany vs. Canada (CAN)	47 - 63	4

=== Wheelchair fencing ===
==== Men ====
Athlete	Event	Qualification			Round of 16	Quarterfinal	Semifinal	Final / BM	
Athlete	Event	Opposition	Score	Rank	Opposition Score	Opposition Score	Opposition Score	Opposition Score	Rank
Martin Ahner	Men's épée A	Stanczuk (POL)	L 1–5	4 Q	Maillard (FRA); W 15-14	Jablonski (POL); L 13–15	did not advance		
Martin Ahner	Men's épée A	Zhang (CHN)	L 3-5	4 Q	Maillard (FRA); W 15-14	Jablonski (POL); L 13–15	did not advance		
Martin Ahner	Men's épée A	Citerne (FRA)	L 3-5	4 Q	Maillard (FRA); W 15-14	Jablonski (POL); L 13–15	did not advance		
Martin Ahner	Men's épée A	Almansouri (KUW)	W 5-4	4 Q	Maillard (FRA); W 15-14	Jablonski (POL); L 13–15	did not advance		
Martin Ahner	Men's épée A	Sanchez (ESP)	W 5-2	4 Q	Maillard (FRA); W 15-14	Jablonski (POL); L 13–15	did not advance		
Martin Ahner	Men's sabre A	Jablonski (POL)	L 4-5	5 Q	El Assine (FRA); L 1-15	did not advance			
Martin Ahner	Men's sabre A	Tai (HKG)	L 3-5	5 Q	El Assine (FRA); L 1-15	did not advance			
Martin Ahner	Men's sabre A	More (FRA)	L 3-5	5 Q	El Assine (FRA); L 1-15	did not advance			
Martin Ahner	Men's sabre A	Serafini (ITA)	L 2-5	5 Q	El Assine (FRA); L 1-15	did not advance			
Martin Ahner	Men's sabre A	Dulah (MAS)	W 5-2	5 Q	El Assine (FRA); L 1-15	did not advance			
Wilfried Lipinski	Men's épée A	Al Qallaf (KUW)	W 5-3	2 Q	More (FRA); L 12-15	did not advance			
Wilfried Lipinski	Men's épée A	Jablonski (POL)	L 4-5	2 Q	More (FRA); L 12-15	did not advance			
Wilfried Lipinski	Men's épée A	Tai (HKG)	W 5-2	2 Q	More (FRA); L 12-15	did not advance			
Wilfried Lipinski	Men's épée A	More (FRA)	W 5-4	2 Q	More (FRA); L 12-15	did not advance			
Wilfried Lipinski	Men's épée A	Peppas (GRE)	L 5-2	2 Q	More (FRA); L 12-15	did not advance			
Wilfried Lipinski	Men's épée A	Rodriguez (ESP)	W 5-1	2 Q	More (FRA); L 12-15	did not advance			
Wilfried Lipinski	Men's sabre A	Pellegrini (ITA)	L 1-5	4 Q	Tai (HKG); W 15-13	El Assine (FRA); L 8-15	did not advance		
Wilfried Lipinski	Men's sabre A	Fung (HKG)	L 1-5	4 Q	Tai (HKG); W 15-13	El Assine (FRA); L 8-15	did not advance		
Wilfried Lipinski	Men's sabre A	Rodriguez (USA)	L 4-5	4 Q	Tai (HKG); W 15-13	El Assine (FRA); L 8-15	did not advance		
Wilfried Lipinski	Men's sabre A	Sanchez (ESP)	W 5-0	4 Q	Tai (HKG); W 15-13	El Assine (FRA); L 8-15	did not advance		
Juergen Mayer	Men's épée B	Lewonowski (POL)	W 5-3	1 Q	Bye	Wysmierski (POL); L 9-15	did not advance		
Juergen Mayer	Men's épée B	Wong (HKG)	W 5-4	1 Q	Bye	Wysmierski (POL); L 9-15	did not advance		
Juergen Mayer	Men's épée B	Latreche (FRA)	W 5-1	1 Q	Bye	Wysmierski (POL); L 9-15	did not advance		
Juergen Mayer	Men's épée B	Alsaedi (KUW)	W 5-2	1 Q	Bye	Wysmierski (POL); L 9-15	did not advance		
Juergen Mayer	Men's épée B	Shumate (USA)	W 5-2	1 Q	Bye	Wysmierski (POL); L 9-15	did not advance		
Juergen Mayer	Men's sabre B	Wysmierski (POL)	L 2-5	3 Q	Bye	Durand (FRA); L 5-15	did not advance		
Juergen Mayer	Men's sabre B	Durand (FRA)	L 2-5	3 Q	Bye	Durand (FRA); L 5-15	did not advance		
Juergen Mayer	Men's sabre B	Szekeres (HUN)	W 5-2	3 Q	Bye	Durand (FRA); L 5-15	did not advance		
Juergen Mayer	Men's sabre B	Heaton (GBR)	W 5-3	3 Q	Bye	Durand (FRA); L 5-15	did not advance		
Juergen Mayer	Men's sabre B	Bogdos (GRE)	W 5-2	3 Q	Bye	Durand (FRA); L 5-15	did not advance		
Juergen Mayer	Men's sabre B	Shumate (USA)	W 5-1	3 Q	Bye	Durand (FRA); L 5-15	did not advance		

==== Women ====
Athlete	Event	Qualification			Round of 16	Quarterfinal	Semifinal	Final / BM	
Athlete	Event	Opposition	Score	Rank	Opposition Score	Opposition Score	Opposition Score	Opposition Score	Rank
Zarife Imeri	Women's épée A	Fan (HKG)	L 1-5	4 Q	Picot (FRA); L 8-15	did not advance			
Zarife Imeri	Women's épée A	Picot (FRA)	L 4-5	4 Q	Picot (FRA); L 8-15	did not advance			
Zarife Imeri	Women's épée A	Witos (POL)	L 0-5	4 Q	Picot (FRA); L 8-15	did not advance			
Zarife Imeri	Women's épée A	Alexander (USA)	W 5-3	4 Q	Picot (FRA); L 8-15	did not advance			
Zarife Imeri	Women's foil A	Krajnyak (HUN)	L 2-5	4 Q	Rossek (GER); L 4-15	did not advance			
Zarife Imeri	Women's foil A	Meyer (FRA)	L 0-5	4 Q	Rossek (GER); L 4-15	did not advance			
Zarife Imeri	Women's foil A	Polasik (POL)	L 2-5	4 Q	Rossek (GER); L 4-15	did not advance			
Zarife Imeri	Women's foil A	Alexander (USA)	W 5-3	4 Q	Rossek (GER); L 4-15	did not advance			
Daniela Rossek	Women's épée A	Trigilia (ITA)	L 4-5	3 Q	Witos (POL); W 15-11	Krajnyak (HUN); L 11-15	did not advance		
Daniela Rossek	Women's épée A	Yu (HKG)	L 0-5	3 Q	Witos (POL); W 15-11	Krajnyak (HUN); L 11-15	did not advance		
Daniela Rossek	Women's épée A	Jurak (HUN)	W 5-1	3 Q	Witos (POL); W 15-11	Krajnyak (HUN); L 11-15	did not advance		
Daniela Rossek	Women's épée A	Meyer (FRA)	W 5-4	3 Q	Witos (POL); W 15-11	Krajnyak (HUN); L 11-15	did not advance		
Daniela Rossek	Women's épée A	Frelik (POL)	W 5-1	3 Q	Witos (POL); W 15-11	Krajnyak (HUN); L 11-15	did not advance		
Daniela Rossek	Women's foil A	Fan (HKG)	L 2-5	3 Q	Imeri (GER); W 15-4	Yu (HKG); L 5-15	did not advance		
Daniela Rossek	Women's foil A	Picot (FRA)	L 3-5	3 Q	Imeri (GER); W 15-4	Yu (HKG); L 5-15	did not advance		
Daniela Rossek	Women's foil A	Frelik (POL)	W 5-0	3 Q	Imeri (GER); W 15-4	Yu (HKG); L 5-15	did not advance		
Daniela Rossek	Women's foil A	Gilmore (USA)	W 5-4	3 Q	Imeri (GER); W 15-4	Yu (HKG); L 5-15	did not advance		
Daniela Rossek	Women's foil A	Tani (JPN)	W 5-2	3 Q	Imeri (GER); W 15-4	Yu (HKG); L 5-15	did not advance		
Waltraud Stollwerck	Women's épée B	Chong (HKG)	L 2-5	5	did not advance				
Waltraud Stollwerck	Women's épée B	Jana (THA)	L 2-5	5	did not advance				
Waltraud Stollwerck	Women's épée B	Palif (HUN)	L 4-5	5	did not advance				
Waltraud Stollwerck	Women's épée B	Hickey (USA)	L 4-5	5	did not advance				
Waltraud Stollwerck	Women's foil B	Dani (HUN)	L 4-5	3 Q	Magnat (FRA); L 12-15	did not advance			
Waltraud Stollwerck	Women's foil B	Hickey (USA)	L 2-5	3 Q	Magnat (FRA); L 12-15	did not advance			
Waltraud Stollwerck	Women's foil B	Wong (HKG)	W 5-1	3 Q	Magnat (FRA); L 12-15	did not advance			
Waltraud Stollwerck	Women's foil B	de Mello (BRA)	W 5-2	3 Q	Magnat (FRA); L 12-15	did not advance			
Esther Weber Kranz	Women's épée B	Dani (HUN)	L 2-5	3 'Q	Wong (HKG); W 15-5	Chan (HKG); L 9-15	did not advance		
Esther Weber Kranz	Women's épée B	Magnat (FRA)	L 2-5	3 'Q	Wong (HKG); W 15-5	Chan (HKG); L 9-15	did not advance		
Esther Weber Kranz	Women's épée B	Wong (HKG)	W 5-4	3 'Q	Wong (HKG); W 15-5	Chan (HKG); L 9-15	did not advance		
Esther Weber Kranz	Women's épée B	de Mello (BRA)	W 5-3	3 'Q	Wong (HKG); W 15-5	Chan (HKG); L 9-15	did not advance		
Esther Weber Kranz	Women's foil B	Jana (THA)	L 2-5	4 Q	Wyrzykowska (POL); L 7-15	did not advance			
Esther Weber Kranz	Women's foil B	Palfi (HUN)	L 4-5	4 Q	Wyrzykowska (POL); L 7-15	did not advance			
Esther Weber Kranz	Women's foil B	Magnat (FRA)	L 2-5	4 Q	Wyrzykowska (POL); L 7-15	did not advance			
Esther Weber Kranz	Women's foil B	Vettraino (ITA)	W 5-4	4 Q	Wyrzykowska (POL); L 7-15	did not advance			

==== Teams ====
Athlete	Event	Quarterfinal	Semifinal	Final / BM	
Athlete	Event	Opposition Score	Opposition Score	Opposition Score	Rank
Martin Ahner; Wilfried Lipinski; Juergen Mayer	Men's épée team	China (CHN); L 38-45	—N/a	5th-6th classification Kuwait (KUW); L 39-45	6
Martin Ahner; Wilfried Lipinski; Juergen Mayer	Men's sabre team	France (FRA); L 35-45	—N/a	5th-6th classification Spain (ESP); W 45-34	5
Zarife Imeri; Daniela Rossek; Waltraud Stollwerck; Esther Weber Kranz	Women's épée team	Poland (POL); L 39-45	5th-7th classification United States (USA); W 45-23	5th-6th classification Italy (ITA); W 45-43	5
Zarife Imeri; Daniela Rossek; Waltraud Stollwerck; Esther Weber Kranz	Women's foil team	Poland (POL); L 38-45	—N/a	5th-6th classification Italy (ITA); L 45-43	6

=== Wheelchair rugby ===
The men's rugby team didn't win any medals: they were 7th out of 8 teams.

==== Players ====
- Hans Bach
- Joerg Holzem
- Bernd Janssen
- Andre Leonhard
- Wolfgang Mayer
- Nacer Menezla
- Oliver Johannes Picht
- Peter Schreiner
- Juergen Schmid
- Christoph Werner
- Dirk Wieschendorf

==== Results ====
Game	Match	Score	Rank
1	Germany vs. Canada (CAN)	30 - 33 (OT)	4 Q
2	Germany vs. Belgium (BEL)	33 - 40	4 Q
3	Germany vs. Great Britain (GBR)	33 - 40	4 Q
Quarterfinals	Germany vs. United States (USA)	34 - 46	L
5th-8th classification	Germany vs. Australia (AUS)	40 - 44	L
7th-8th classification	Germany vs. Japan (JPN)	41 - 40	7

=== Wheelchair tennis ===
Athlete	Class	Event	Round of 64	Round of 32	Round of 16	Quarterfinals	Semifinals	Finals
Athlete	Class	Event	Opposition Result	Opposition Result	Opposition Result	Opposition Result	Opposition Result	Opposition Result
Kai Schrameyer	Open	Men's singles	Santos (BRA); W 6–1, 6–2	Farkas (HUN); L 7-5, 6-7, 3-6	did not advance			
Britta Siegers	Open	Women's singles	McMorran (GBR); W 6–0, 6–3	Verfuerth (USA); W 6–1, 6–2	Peters (NED); L 6-7, 3-6	did not advance		

== See also ==
- Germany at the Paralympics
- Germany at the 2004 Summer Olympics
