= Germany at the Paralympics =

- IPC code: GER
- NPC: National Paralympic Committee Germany
- Website: www.dbs-npc.de (in German)
- Medals: Gold 658 Silver 649 Bronze 609 Total 1,916

Summer appearances
- 1960; 1964; 1968; 1972; 1976; 1980; 1984; 1988; 1992; 1996; 2000; 2004; 2008; 2012; 2016; 2020; 2024

Winter appearances
- 1976; 1980; 1984; 1988; 1992; 1994; 1998; 2002; 2006; 2010; 2014; 2018; 2022; 2026

Other related appearances
- East Germany (1984)

Germany (GER) participated in the inaugural Paralympic Games in 1960 in Rome, where it sent a delegation of nine athletes. The country, since 1949 officially the Federal Republic of Germany (FRG), was until 1990 also called West Germany while the separate East German Democratic Republic (GDR) existed, which was recognized by the IOC only after 1964. East German athletes, however, participated in the Paralympics for the first and last time in 1984. Following the reunification of Germany in 1990, athletes from all of Germany compete simply as Germany (GER) again.

Germany has participated in every edition of the Summer Paralympics, and has also taken part in every edition of the Winter Paralympics, from the first in 1976. Germany was the host country of the 1972 Summer Paralympics, in Heidelberg.

East Germany, West Germany and Germany have won a total of 1915 Paralympic medals, of which 658 gold, 649 silver and 609 bronze. This is more than any country other than the United States and Great Britain. The International Paralympic Committee, however, maintains separate records for "West Germany" (1960–88) and "Germany" (1992–present), due to their separate IPC codes, giving West Germany a total of 938 medals (354 golds), and Germany a total of 973 (304 golds). This places the "two countries" seventh and eighth, respectively, on the all-time Paralympic Games medal table - behind the United States, Great Britain, China, Canada, Australia, and France.

Germany has consistently been one of the world's strongest nations at the Paralympics. Prior to 2008, at the Summer Games, it had always been among the top ten on the medal tables, and was within the top three on six occasions. In 2008, they finished in the 11th place. At the Winter Games, Germany has always been among the top three, except in 1980 (7th), 1984 (4th) and 2018 (5th). It topped the medal table at the 1972 Summer Paralympics (which it hosted), and the 1976, 2002 and 2010 Winter Games.

Among Germany's most successful Paralympians are

- Reinhild Möller, winner of 19 medals (of which 16 gold) in alpine skiing, and 4 medals (of which 3 are gold) in athletics
- Claudia Hengst: 25 medals (of which 13 gold) in swimming
- Gerd Schönfelder: 17 medals (of which 12 gold) in alpine skiing
- Frank Höfle: 17 medals (of which 10 gold) in cross-country skiing.

== Medal tallies ==
These tallies include the results for both "Germany" and "West Germany". They do not include the four medals of East Germany at the Paralympics.

=== Summer Paralympics ===
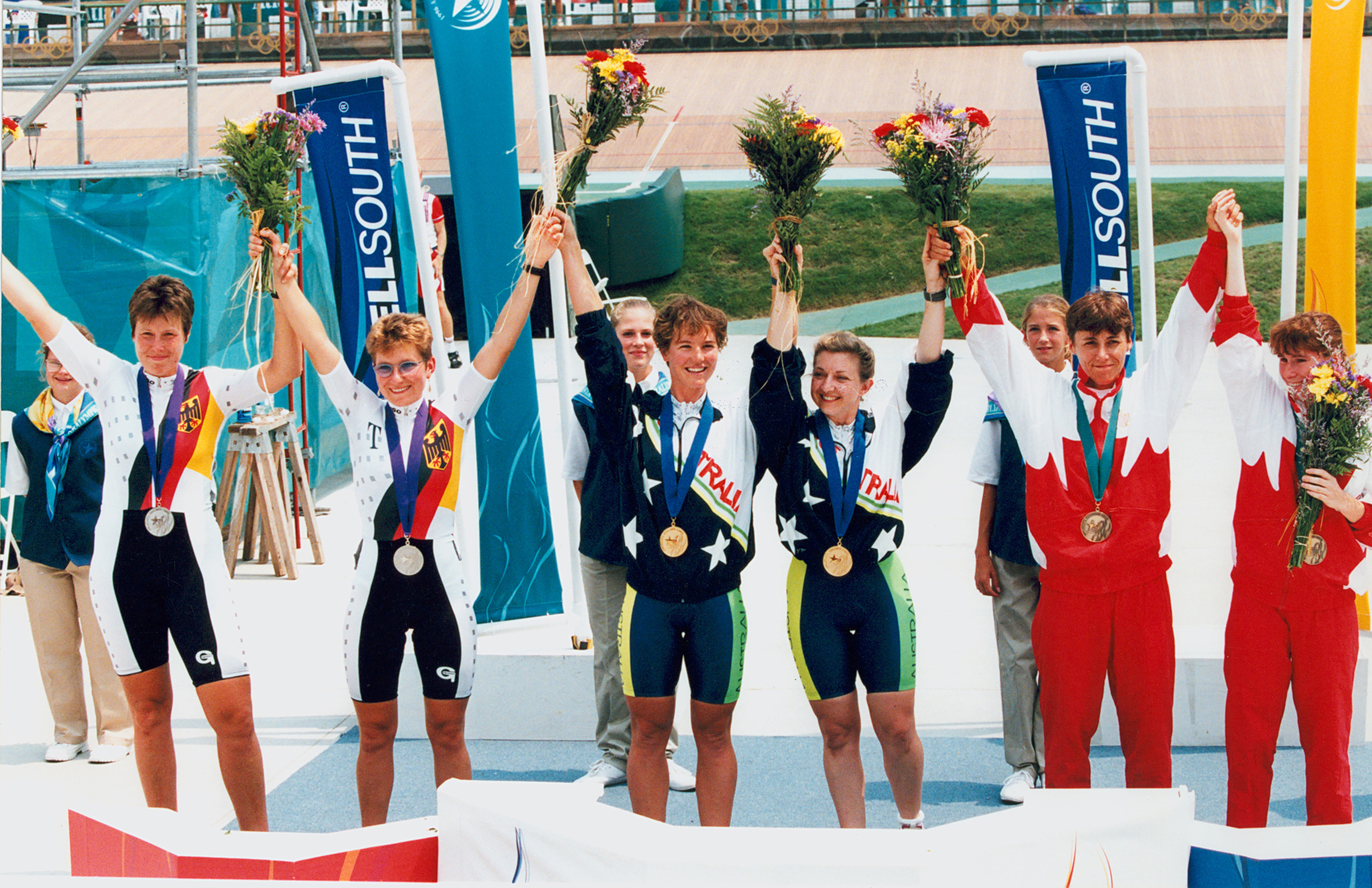
Elfriede Ranz (Pilot) and Ursula Egner of Germany on the medal dais after winning silver in the Women's tandem Kilo on the track at the 1996 Atlanta Paralympic Games.

Event	Gold	Silver	Bronze	Total	Ranking
(Spain) Barcelona 1992	61	51	59	171	2nd
(United States) Atlanta 1996	40	58	51	149	3rd
(Australia) Sydney 2000	16	41	38	95	10th
(Greece) Athens 2004	19	28	31	78	8th
(China) Beijing 2008	14	25	20	59	11th
(United Kingdom) London 2012	18	26	22	66	8th
(Brazil) Rio de Janeiro 2016	18	25	14	57	6th
(Japan) Tokyo 2020	13	12	18	43	12th
(France) Paris 2024	10	14	25	49	11th
(United States) Los Angeles 2028	future event				
Total	531	540	524	1595	4th

=== Medals by summer sport ===
Medals by sport

Sport	Gold	Silver	Bronze	Total
Athletics	217	223	233	673
Swimming	142	143	121	406
Table tennis	69	57	57	183
Road cycling	22	22	19	63
Archery	18	10	12	40
Shooting	16	19	20	55
Wheelchair fencing	14	23	19	56
Equestrian	6	14	10	30
Judo	4	4	9	17
Volleyball	4	2	3	9
Wheelchair basketball	3	5	1	9
Dartchery	3	0	0	3
Powerlifting	3	0	0	3
Track cycling	2	8	9	19
Sailing	2	3	0	5
Paratriathlon	2	1	2	5
Goalball	2	1	0	3
Paracanoeing	1	2	4	7
Lawn bowls	1	0	0	1
Wheelchair tennis	0	1	4	5
Rowing	0	1	1	2
Badminton	0	0	1	1
Totals (22 entries)	531	539	525	1,595

=== Winter Paralympics ===
Event	Gold	Silver	Bronze	Total	Ranking
(France) Tignes-Albertville 1992	12	17	9	38	2nd
(Norway) Lillehammer 1994	25	21	18	64	2nd
(Japan) Nagano 1998	14	17	13	44	2nd
(United States) Salt Lake City 2002	17	1	15	33	1st
(Italy) Turin 2006	8	5	5	18	2nd
(Canada) Vancouver 2010	13	5	6	24	1st
(Russia) Sochi 2014	9	5	1	15	2nd
(South Korea) Pyeongchang 2018	7	8	4	19	5th
(China) Beijing 2022	4	8	7	19	7th
(Italy) Milano Cortina 2026	2	6	9	17	11th
Total	111	93	87	291	4th

== Records ==
These records include West Germany at the Paralympics.

=== Summer Paralympics ===
Active athletes are in bold.

Multi medalists

German athletes who have won more than three golds or more than five medals.

No.	Athlete	Sport	Years	Games	Gender	Gold	Silver	Bronze	Total
1	Claudia Hengst	Swimming	1988-2004	5	F	13	4	8	25
2	Marianne Buggenhagen	Athletics	1992-2016	7	F	9	2	3	14
3	Jochen Wollmert	Table tennis	1992-2012	6	M	5	2	3	10
4	Robert Figl	Athletics	1988-2004	5	M	5	1	6	12
5	Wojtek Czyz	Athletics	2004-2012	3	M	4	1	2	7
5	Heinrich Köberle	Athletics	1984-2000	5	M	4	1	0	5
6	Peter Haber	Athletics	1992-2000	3	M	3	5	0	8
7	Martina Willing	Athletics	1992-2016	7	F	3	4	5	12
8	Daniela Schulte	Swimming	1996-2012	5	F	3	4	1	8
9	Britta Jänicke	Athletics	1988-2000	4	F	3	1	2	6
10	Jessica Sachse	Athletics	1988-2004	5	F	2	3	3	8
11	**Ramona Brussig**	Judo	2004-2016	4	F	2	2	1	5
12	Horst Beyer	Athletics	1992-2000	3	M	2	1	2	5
13	Jörg Frischmann	Athletics	1992-2000	3	M	1	2	2	5

Multi medalists at single Games

German athletes who have won more than two golds at a single Games. Categorised by medals earned, sports then year.

No.	Athlete	Sport	Year	Gender	Gold	Silver	Bronze	Total
1	Claudia Hengst	Swimming	1988	F	6	0	0	6
2	Marianne Buggenhagen	Athletics	1992	F	4	0	0	4
3	Jessica Sachse	Athletics	1992	F	2	0	0	2

Multi medals at single event

German athletes who have won more than two golds at a single event in the Summer Paralympics. Categorised by medals earned, sports then gold medals earned.

No.	Athlete	Sport	Event	Years	Games	Gender	Gold	Silver	Bronze	Total
1	Heinrich Köberle	Athletics	Marathon	1984-2000	5	M	4	1	0	5
2	Jochen Wollmert	Table tennis	Singles	1992-2012	6	M	3	2	1	6
3	Marianne Buggenhagen	Athletics	Discus throw	1992-2016	7	F	3	1	0	4
4	Siegmund Hegeholz	Athletics	Javelin throw	1992-2004	4	M	2	2	0	4

Most appearances

German athletes who have competed in four or more Paralympic Games. Aged under 15 or over 40 are in bold.

No.	Athlete	Sport	Birth Year	Games Years	First/Last Age	Gender	Gold	Silver	Bronze	Total
1	Marianne Buggenhagen	Athletics	1953	1992-2016	39 - **63**	F	9	2	3	14
2	Martina Willing	Athletics	1959	1992-2020	33 - **61**	F	3	4	5	12
3	Heinrich Köberle	Athletics	1946	1984-2000	38 - **54**	M	4	1	0	5
4	Jochen Wollmert	Table tennis	1964	1992-2012	28 - **48**	M	5	2	3	10
5	Robert Figl	Athletics	1967	1988-2004	21 - 37	M	5	1	6	12

=== Winter Paralympics ===
Multi medalists

German athletes who have won three gold medals or more than five medals.

No.	Athlete	Sport	Years	Games	Gender	Gold	Silver	Bronze	Total
1	Gerd Schönfelder	Alpine skiing	1992-2010	6	M	16	4	2	22
2	Reinhild Möller	Alpine skiing	1980-2006	8	F	16	2	1	19
3	Frank Höfle	Biathlon; Cross-country skiing	1988-2002	5	M	13	5	3	21
4	Verena Bentele	Biathlon; Cross-country skiing	1998-2010	4	F	12	2	2	16
5	Martin Braxenthaler	Alpine skiing	1998-2010	4	M	10	1	1	12
6	**Anna Schaffelhuber**	Alpine skiing	2010-2018	3	F	7	1	1	9
7	Thomas Oelsner	Biathlon	1994-2006	4	M	5	4	1	10
8	**Andrea Rothfuss**	Alpine skiing	2006-2018	4	F	1	9	3	12

Multi medals at single Games

German athletes who have won two golds in a single Games. Categorised by medals earned, sports then year.

No.	Athlete	Sport	Year	Gender	Gold	Silver	Bronze	Total
1	Verena Bentele	Biathlon; Cross-country skiing	2010	F	5	0	0	5
1	**Anna Schaffelhuber**	Alpine skiing	2014	F	5	0	0	5
3	Gerd Schönfelder	Alpine skiing	2010	M	4	1	0	5

Multi medals at single event

German athletes who have won two golds in a single event in the Winter Paralympics. Categorised by medals earned, sports then gold medals earned.

No.	Athlete	Sport	Event	Years	Games	Gender	Gold	Silver	Bronze	Total
1	Frank Höfle	Biathlon	7.5 km	1992-2002	4	M	3	0	1	4

Most appearances

German athletes who have competed in four or more Winter Paralympic Games. Ages under 15 or over 40 are in bold.

No.	Athlete	Sport	Birth Year	Games Years	First/Last Age	Gender	Gold	Silver	Bronze	Total
1	Reinhild Möller	Alpine skiing	1956	1980-2006	24 - **50**	F	16	2	1	19
2	Gerd Schönfelder	Alpine skiing	1970	1992-2010	22 - **40**	M	16	4	2	22

== See also ==
- Germany at the Olympics
- East Germany at the Paralympics
- All-time Paralympic Games medal table
