= Athletics at the 2004 Summer Paralympics – Men's javelin throw F11–13 =

Men's javelin throw events for blind & visually impaired athletes were held at the 2004 Summer Paralympics in the Athens Olympic Stadium. Events were held in three disability classes.

== F11 ==
Men's Javelin F11 at the XII Paralympic Games
- Venue: Athens Olympic Stadium
- Dates: 27 September 2004
- Competitors: 13 from 12 nations
- Winning distance: 49.33

Medalists
1st place, gold medalist(s)		Bil Marinkovic	Austria
2nd place, silver medalist(s)		Siegmund Hegeholz	Germany
3rd place, bronze medalist(s)		Mineho Ozaki	Japan

The F11 event was won by Bil Marinkovic, representing Austria.

27 Sept. 2004, 20:15

Rank	Athlete	Result	Notes
1st place, gold medalist(s)	Bil Marinkovic (AUT)	49.33	WR
2nd place, silver medalist(s)	Siegmund Hegeholz (GER)	45.87	
3rd place, bronze medalist(s)	Mineho Ozaki (JPN)	40.90	
4	Li Duan (CHN)	39.82	
5	Anibal Bello (VEN)	39.36	
6	Vytautas Girnius (LTU)	39.01	
7	Rayk Haucke (GER)	33.60	
8	Kazem Moradi (IRI)	33.33	
9	Andres Furtado (URU)	24.81	
10	Han Sung Hyun (KOR)	22.64	
	Ferenc Horvath (HUN)		NMR
	Daniel Jimenez (MEX)		NMR
	Loukas Kaskanis (GRE)	DNS	

== F12 ==
Men's Javelin F12 at the XII Paralympic Games
- Venue: Athens Olympic Stadium
- Dates: 20 September 2004
- Competitors: 13 from 12 nations
- Winning distance: 56.63

Medalists
1st place, gold medalist(s)		Aliaksandr Tryputs	Belarus
2nd place, silver medalist(s)		Miroslaw Pych	Poland
3rd place, bronze medalist(s)		Miloš Grlica	Serbia and Montenegro

The F12 event was won by Aliaksandr Tryputs, representing Belarus.

20 Sept. 2004, 20:00

Rank	Athlete	Result	Notes
1st place, gold medalist(s)	Aliaksandr Tryputs (BLR)	56.63	PR
2nd place, silver medalist(s)	Miroslaw Pych (POL)	52.32	
3rd place, bronze medalist(s)	Miloš Grlica (SCG)	52.05	
4	Seyed Erfan Hosseini (IRI)	50.76	
5	Yan Hua Gang (CHN)	50.12	
6	Thomas Validis (GER)	48.74	
7	Hilton Langenhoven (RSA)	48.26	
8	Stéphane Bozzolo (FRA)	47.39	
9	Albert van der Mee (NED)	45.89	
10	Shigeo Osemachi (JPN)	44.55	
11	Sun Hai Tao (CHN)	DNF	
12	Vladimir Andryushchenko (RUS)	41.32	
13	Roman Mesyk (UKR)	39.01	

== F13 ==
Men's Javelin F13 at the XII Paralympic Games
- Venue: Athens Olympic Stadium
- Dates: 23 September 2004
- Competitors: 6 from 6 nations
- Winning distance: 59.38

Medalists
1st place, gold medalist(s)		Chiang Chih Chung	Chinese Taipei
2nd place, silver medalist(s)		Zhou Bo Quan	China
3rd place, bronze medalist(s)		France Gagne	Canada

The F13 event was won by Chiang Chih Chung, representing Chinese Taipei.

23 Sept. 2004, 18:30

Rank	Athlete	Result	Notes
1st place, gold medalist(s)	Chiang Chih Chung (TPE)	59.38	WR
2nd place, silver medalist(s)	Zhou Bo Quan (CHN)	56.54	
3rd place, bronze medalist(s)	France Gagne (CAN)	50.01	
4	Siarhei Siamianiaka (BLR)	44.67	
5	Yuriy Kvitkov (KAZ)	41.22	
6	Mohammed Fannouna (PLE)	39.92	
