= Swimming at the 2004 Summer Paralympics – Women's 400 metre freestyle S9 =

Women's 400m Freestyle S9 at the XII Paralympic Games
- Paralympic Swimming
- Venue: Olympic Aquatic Centre
- Dates: 24 September 2004
- Competitors: 12 from 10 nations
- Winning time: 4:28.09

Medalists
| 1st place, gold medalist(s) | | Natalie du Toit | South Africa |
| 2nd place, silver medalist(s) | | Stephanie Dixon | Canada |
| 3rd place, bronze medalist(s) | | Christiane Reppe | Germany |

The Women's 400 metre freestyle S9 swimming event at the 2004 Summer Paralympics was competed on 24 September. It was won by Natalie du Toit, representing South Africa.

== 1st round ==
| Qualified for final round |

Heat 1

24 Sept. 2004, morning session

| Rank | Athlete | Time | Notes |
|---|---|---|---|
| 1 | Stephanie Dixon (CAN) | 5:11.57 | |
| 2 | Darda Geiger (CAN) | 5:12.89 | |
| 3 | Sarah Powell (NZL) | 5:18.66 | |
| 4 | Kelly Crowley (USA) | 5:20.59 | |
| 5 | Zhou Zi Cun (CHN) | 5:23.42 | |
| 6 | Tereza Diepoldova (CZE) | 5:26.49 | |

Heat 2

24 Sept. 2004, morning session

| Rank | Athlete | Time | Notes |
|---|---|---|---|
| 1 | Natalie du Toit (RSA) | 4:43.66 | PR |
| 2 | Christiane Reppe (GER) | 5:11.14 | |
| 3 | Ana Sršen (CRO) | 5:11.69 | |
| 4 | Leila Marques (POR) | 5:18.67 | |
| 5 | Beata Drozdowska (POL) | 5:28.34 | |
| 6 | Miriam Jenkins (NZL) | 5:28.81 | |

== Final round ==
24 Sept. 2004, evening session

| Rank | Athlete | Time | Notes |
|---|---|---|---|
| 1st place, gold medalist(s) | Natalie du Toit (RSA) | 4:28.09 | WR |
| 2nd place, silver medalist(s) | Stephanie Dixon (CAN) | 4:46.57 | |
| 3rd place, bronze medalist(s) | Christiane Reppe (GER) | 4:59.91 | |
| 4 | Ana Sršen (CRO) | 5:07.10 | |
| 5 | Darda Geiger (CAN) | 5:09.54 | |
| 6 | Leila Marques (POR) | 5:17.50 | |
| 7 | Kelly Crowley (USA) | 5:17.87 | |
| 8 | Sarah Powell (NZL) | 5:20.53 | |
