= Solbrig =

Solbrig is a surname. Notable people with the surname include:

- Inge Solbrig (born 1944), German actress and voice actress
- Karl August von Solbrig (1809–1872), German physician and psychiatrist
- Otto Thomas Solbrig (born 1930), Argentinian evolutionary biologist and botanist
- Sven Solbrig, German paralympic athlete
