= Martin Horn =

Martin Horn may refer to:

- Martin Horn (athlete) (born 1969), German paralympic athlete
- Martin Horn (politician) (born 1984), mayor of Freiburg im Breisgau
