= Athletics at the 1992 Summer Paralympics – Men's discus throw B3 =

Men's discus throw B3 at the IX Paralympic Games
- Paralympic Athletics
- Venue: Estadi Olímpic de Montjuïc
- Dates: September 1992
- Competitors: 4 from 4 nations

Medalists
1st place, gold medalist(s)		Russell Short	Australia
2nd place, silver medalist(s)		France Gagne	Canada
3rd place, bronze medalist(s)		Attila Pazinczar	Hungary

The Men's discus throw B3 was a field event in athletics at the 1992 Summer Paralympics, for visually impaired athletes.

== Results ==
=== Final ===
Place	Athlete	Width
1	Russell Short (AUS)	45.94
2	France Gagne (CAN)	37.32
3	Attila Pazinczar (HUN)	36.88
4	Jerry Simental (USA)	35.30
