= Zhou Bo Quan =

Chinese Paralympic athlete

Medal record

Men's para-athletics

Representing China

Paralympic Games
| Silver medal – second place | 2004 Athens | Javelin throw F13 |

Zhou Bo Quan is a paralympic athlete from China competing mainly in category F13 throws events.

Zhou Bo Quan first competed in the 2000 Summer Paralympics in all three throws, shot, javelin and discus, but it wasn't until the following games in Athens that he won his first medal, a silver in the F13 javelin as well as again competing in the discus.
