= Mineho Ozaki =

Japanese Paralympic athlete

Medal record

Track and field (athletics)

Representing Japan

Paralympic Games
Gold medal – first place	1984 Stoke Mandeville / New York	Long Jump - B2
Gold medal – first place	1988 Seoul	Long Jump - B1
Gold medal – first place	1988 Seoul	Triple Jump - B1
Gold medal – first place	1992 Barcelona	Long Jump - B1
Gold medal – first place	1996 Atlanta	Javelin Throw - F10
Silver medal – second place	1984 Stoke Mandeville / New York	Triple Jump - B2
Bronze medal – third place	1984 Stoke Mandeville / New York	Discus Throw - B2
Bronze medal – third place	1988 Seoul	Javelin Throw - B1
Bronze medal – third place	1992 Barcelona	Javelin Throw - B1
Bronze medal – third place	2000 Sydney	Javelin Throw - F10
Bronze medal – third place	2004 Athens	Javelin Throw - F11

Mineho Ozaki (尾崎 峰穂, Ozaki Mineho) is a paralympic athlete from Japan competing mainly in category F11 javelin and long jump events.

Mineho has competed in seven Paralympics winning a total of eleven medals including five gold. His first games were in 1984 where he won a complete set of medals, gold in the long jump, silver in the triple jump and bronze in the discus as well as competing in the 100m and javelin. In 1988 he dropped the 100m and competed in the discus, won a bronze medal in the javelin and gold in both the long jump and triple jump. 1992 saw him drop the discus but he still competed in the triple jump won a bronze in the javelin and a third consecutive gold in the long jump. Mineho dropped the triple jump at the 1996 Summer Paralympics concentrating on the long jump and javelin, not only was this the first games he had been beaten in the long jump but he only managed to finish fifth, he did however win the javelin. He would also compete in the long jump and javelin in both the 2000 and 2004 Summer Paralympics winning bronze in the javelin on both occasions meaning he had won a medal in five consecutive Paralympic javelin competitions. He could not maintain this and despite only competing in the javelin at the 2008 Summer Paralympics he could only manage sixth place.
