= France Gagné =

Canadian Paralympic athlete

Medal record

Paralympic athletics

Representing Canada

Paralympic Games
Silver medal – second place	1992 Barcelona	Discus Throw - B3
Silver medal – second place	1996 Atlanta	Javelin Throw - F12
Silver medal – second place	2000 Sydney	Javelin Throw - F13
Bronze medal – third place	2000 Sydney	Javelin Throw - F13
Bronze medal – third place	2004 Athens	Javelin Throw - F13

France Gagné is a paralympic athlete from Canada competing mainly in category F56 throwing events.

== Biography ==
Gagné has competed in four paralympics, always in just the javelin and discus, excepting in Sydney in 2000, where he also competed in shot. He has twice won silver in javelin, in 1996 and 2000 as well as a bronze in 2004 while in discus he won a silver in 1992 and a bronze in 2000 Summer Paralympics.
