= Miriam Jenkins =

New Zealand athlete

Miriam Sheppard
Personal information
- Born: Miriam Jenkins; 10 February 1986 (age 40)

Sport
- Country: New Zealand
- Sport: Para athletics, Para swimming, Para triathlon
Medal record
Women's paratriathlon
Representing New Zealand
World Championships
Gold medal – first place	2009 Gold Coast	TRI 3

Miriam Sheppard (née Jenkins, born 10 February 1986) is a New Zealand former para athlete and para swimmer. She was the 2009 ITU Paratriathlon World Champion in TRI3 classification. In addition, she represented New Zealand at the 2004 Summer Paralympic Games. in Athens, Greece, in swimming, as well as at the 2005 CPISRA World Games – in both swimming and track & field. Jenkins is affected by mild cerebral palsy in her left side.

Jenkins began her swimming career in 2000 at the New Zealand College Games in her hometown of Hamilton, New Zealand, where she won eight gold medals and set several national junior records. At the 2001 Paralympics New Zealand Championships she won seven gold and five silver medals in swimming and won the Halberg Trust junior scholarship prize. Jenkins was named to her first national team in 2002, competing at the British Open in Sheffield, England, and the USA Swimming National Disability Championships. In 2003, she won medals at the ISMWSF World Wheelchair Championships, and early the following year was named to New Zealand's Paralympic Team.

At the Athens 2004 Paralympic Games, Jenkins placed sixth in her heat of the S9 women's 400 m freestyle and did not qualify for the final, which was eventually won by South Africa's Natalie du Toit. She received a New Zealand University Blue award, one of only two Paralympians to do so, in 2004 while she was a student at the University of Waikato.

The following year, she won titles at the CPISRA World Games in New London, Connecticut, in the 100m freestyle, 400m freestyle and 200m individual medley, as well as the 800m track race. Additionally, Jenkins earned silvers in the 50m freestyle and 100m backstroke, and the 400m track event. Until the end of 2005, Jenkins was supported by the now-defunct Peter Snell Institute of Sport.

Jenkins was named as a member of New Zealand's first Paratriathlon team for the 2009 ITU Triathlon World Championships Grand Final in Gold Coast, Queensland, Australia. On 9 September she competed in the age-group event in the Aquathlon, and followed this with a victory three days later in the standard distance Paratriathlon race. Jenkins was the sole gold medallist on the New Zealand standard distance team (including elite), the only other gold being won by sprint distance age-group athlete, Maddie Dillon.

She competed at the 2012 ITU World Triathlon Grand Final in Auckland, New Zealand and won bronze in TRI3 classification. She was a panel member at the ITU Women's Committee Conference.

In December 2009, she was named Waikato Sportswoman of the Year and was later nominated for a Halberg award as well as for the "Performance of the Year" award at the Triathlon New Zealand 2010 Awards.

Jenkins studied at the University of Otago in Dunedin and worked for the New Zealand Department of Conservation.

Since August 2019, she has worked at the International Paralympic Committee as World Para Athletics Competition Coordinator.
