= Georg Meyer (athlete) =

German Paralympic athlete

Medal record

Paralympic athletics

Representing Germany

Paralympic Games
Bronze medal – third place	2000 Sydney	4x100 metre relay T46

Georg Meyer is a paralympic athlete from Germany competing mainly in category T46/F46 events.

Meyer competed in the 2000 Summer Paralympics in the 200m, javelin and high jump and was part of the German team in the T46 4 × 400 m and the bronze medal-winning 4 × 100 m team.
