= Michaela Fuchs =

German cyclist and skier

Personal information
- Born: 18 December 1969
- Died: 8 May 2018 (aged 48)

Sport
- Sport: Paralympic cycling Biathlon; Cross-country skiing
Medal record
Representing Germany
Cycling
Summer Paralympics
Gold medal – first place	2000 Sydney	Sprint B
Silver medal – second place	2000 Sydney	1km time trial B
Silver medal – second place	2000 Sydney	Road race B
World Championships
Silver medal – second place	1998 Colorado Springs	1km time trial B
Silver medal – second place	2002 Augsburg	Sprint B
Bronze medal – third place	1998 Colorado Springs	Sprint B
Bronze medal – third place	2002 Augsburg	Road race B
Bronze medal – third place	2002 Augsburg	1km time trial
Winter Paralympics
Cross-country skiing
Silver medal – second place	1994 Albertville	Relay open

Michaela Fuchs (18 December 1969 – 8 May 2018) was a Paralympic cyclist who competed in international cycling and skiing competitions. She won three medals at the 2000 Summer Paralympics and one silver medal at the 1994 Winter Paralympics.

Fuchs was born with albinism and was legally blind. She took up cross-country skiing as a teenager then competed at the 1988 Winter Paralympics.
