= Drazen Boric =

German Paralympic athlete

Medal record

Track and field (athletics)

Representing Germany

Paralympic Games
Bronze medal – third place	1996 Atlanta	4x400 metre relay - T54

Drazan Boric is a paralympic athlete from Germany competing mainly in category T53 wheelchair racing events.

Drazen competed in the 1996 Summer Paralympics without winning a medal, he competed in the 800m, 5000m, 10000m and marathon. In the 2000 Summer Paralympics he again competed in the 800m and 400m and was a part of the bronze medal-winning German 4 × 400 m relay.
