= Inge Solbrig =

German actress (born 1944)

Inge Solbrig-Combrinck (born Ingeborg Solbig, 1944) is a German actress best known as the German voice of several characters in The Simpsons including Edna Krabappel, Helen Lovejoy, Judge Constance Harm, Crazy Cat Lady, Mona Simpson, Lunchlady Doris, Itchy & Scratchy and a lot of additional voices. She was married to Ivar Combrinck († 2006) who produced Futurama, Family Guy and The Simpsons in Germany.

== Voice acting (selection) ==
=== Animated series & movies ===
Title	Role	original actor	Notes
The Simpsons	Edna Krabappel and others	Marcia Wallace and others	season 4—present
Family Guy	Loretta Brown (season 1—3) and additional voices (season 1—present)	Alex Borstein	season 1—present
Futurama	Mom and additional voices	Tress MacNeille	season 1—present
One Piece	Terracotta	Keiichi Sonobe	
Fushigi no Kuni no Alice	Mother	Yoshiko Matsuo	
Basilisk	Ogen	Hisako Kyōda	
The Simpsons Movie	Edna Krabappel, Itchy & Scratchy	Marcia Wallace, Dan Castellaneta, Harry Shearer	
Toy Story 2	Mrs. Potato Head	Estelle Harris	
Tales from Earthsea	Vendor	Mitsuko Baisho	

=== Television series & movies ===
Title	Role	original actor	Notes
Slap Shot	Shirley Upton	Swoosie Kurtz	
Friday the 13th Part III	Edna	Cheri Maugans	
Columbo: Ashes to Ashes	Mrs. Lerby	Edie McClurg	
Memento	Mrs. Jankis	Harriet Sansom Harris	
Dear Frankie	Nell	Mary Riggans	
Atonement	Grace Turner	Brenda Blethyn	
Taken	Patty	Janet Wright	
The Guardian	Liz	Christine Estabrook	2 episodes
