= Steffen Woischnik =

German Paralympic athlete

Medal record

Paralympic athletics

Representing Germany

Paralympic Games
Bronze medal – third place	1996 Atlanta	4x400 metre relay - T54

Steffen Woischnik is a paralympic athlete from Germany competing mainly in category T54 sprint events.

Steffen has competed in 2 Paralympics, his first in 1996 he competed in the 100m, 200m and 400m and was part of the German 4 × 400 m relay team. In 2000 Summer Paralympics he added the 4 × 100 m to the events he did but it was as part of the German 4 × 400 m relay team that he won is only medal, a bronze.
