= Simona Kegel =

German Paralympic athlete

Medal record

Paralympic athletics

Representing Germany

Paralympic Games
Silver medal – second place	2000 Sydney	Shot Put - F37

Simona Kegel is a paralympic athlete from Germany competing mainly in category F37 events.

In the 1996 Summer Paralympics Kegel competed in the 100m, 200m and long jump. It wasn't until she changed to the shot put in the 2000 Summer Paralympics that she won a medal, silver, in the F37 class.
