= Ana Sršen =

Croatian paralympic swimmer and coach

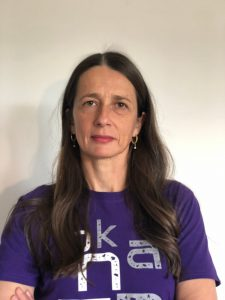

Personal information
- Nationality: Croatian
- Born: December 24, 1973 (age 52)

Sport
- Sport: Swimming
- Strokes: Breaststroke, Freestyle
- Classifications: S7, SB8
Medal record
Representing Croatia
Mediterranean Games
Silver medal – second place	2001 Tunis	100m freestyle handisports
World Para Swimming Championships
Silver medal – second place	1998 Christchurch	100m breaststroke SB8
Bronze medal – third place	2002 Mar del Plata	5km open water

Ana Sršen (born 1973 in Dubrovnik, Croatia, living in Zagreb) is the first prominent paralympic swimmer of modern Croatia, later coach and founder on swimming club Natator. She broke several European records during her competitive years in swimming and remained an activist and advocate for swimming, sports and athletes, as well as a sport official.

== Biography ==
After cancer-related leg amputations the age of 13, she did not give up on physical activity. She moved to London to study and be coached more professionally. In 1998 she became a world record holder in 100 m breaststroke. In 2002, she set two world records at International Competition in Zagreb: for 200 m and 800 m freestyle. She competed at four Paralympic Games from 1996 until 2008 when she took part in 2008 Summer Paralympics as her last major competition, less than 4 months after giving birth to a son.

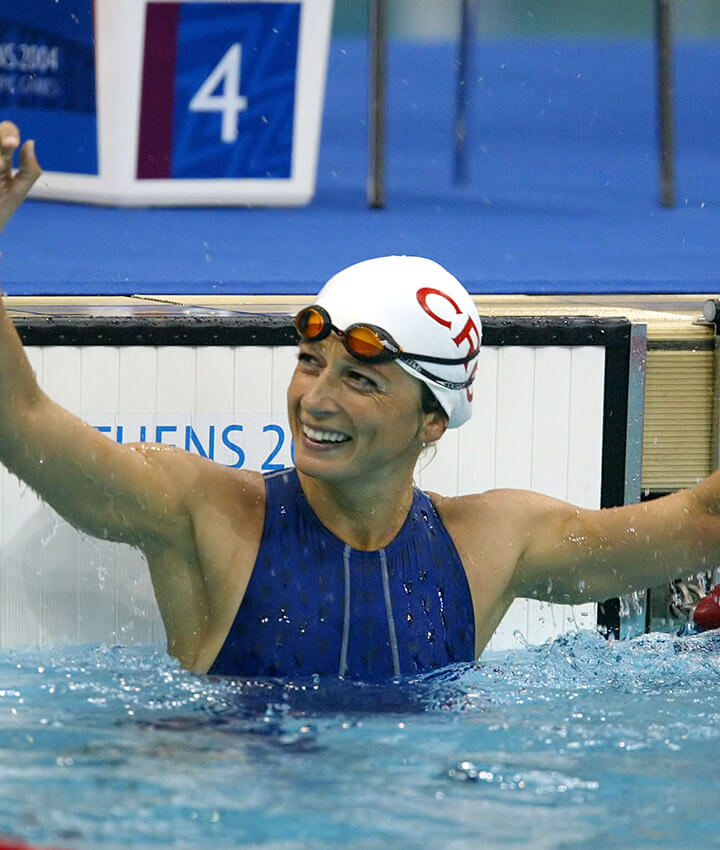
Ana Sršen after the race in 2004

Sršen is leading Swimming Club Natator which trains new generations of international paralympic swimmers.

She was a founding director of the Croatian Federation for Para Swimming (Hrvatski plivački savez osoba s invaliditetom) in 2006, managing it for 12 years and is currently a vice-president of Croatian Paralympic committee.

Sršen often presents and speaks in favor of more accessible, socially just and democratic sport system for all to join, including media appearances on TV, print and online media that increase visibility of athletes with prosthetics as well as to normalize it and have support available for kids.

She is married to Boris Šušković, founder of WULF Sport and ShoeBeDo stores, with who she has 2 children. In 2007 she lost her teenage younger brother as a result of a car accident on the island of Mljet (where her family resides) and emergency transport issues. In his honor she established a foundation, but also advocated for infrastructural work for this remote island.
