= Catherine Bader-Bille =

German Paralympic athlete

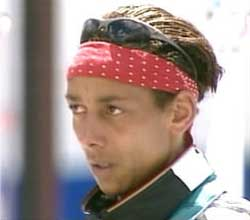
- Catherine Bader-Bille

Medal record

Paralympic athletics

Representing Germany

Paralympic Games
Gold medal – first place	2000 Sydney	Long Jump - F46

Catherine Bader-Bille is a paralympic athlete from Germany competing mainly in category F46 long jump events.

In 2000 Catherine competed in the 100m and long jump in the Paralympics winning the F46 long jump.
