= Wolfgang Stöckl =

German diplomat (1948–2024)

Wolfgang Stöckl (11 June 1948–28 January 2024) served as the Vice Chairman of the United Nations International Civil Service Commission.

Before becoming the Vice Chairman of ICSC, Stöckl was Ambassador and Special Coordinator for German Personnel in International Organizations. From 2000 to 2002, he served as Director of Economic and Development Affairs in the United Nations and Global Affairs Department of the Foreign Office of the Federal Republic of Germany. From 1997 to 2000, he was First Counsellor of the Permanent Mission of the Federal Republic of Germany to the Organization for Economic Cooperation and Development in Paris, in charge of the Public Management Committee and human resources management issues. He was a member of the ICSC from 1997 to 2002.

In 1997, he served as Chairman of the Committee for Programme and Coordination of the United Nations. Between 1995 and 1997, he was member of the UN Advisory Committee on Administrative and Budgetary Questions(ACABQ). From 1991 to 1997, he was Counsellor of the Permanent Mission of the Federal Republic of Germany to the United Nations in New York. In this capacity, he was in charge of the UN reform, common system and human resources management issues.

Earlier in his career, he served on a variety of capacities in the German foreign service, including as Special Adviser for Management and Personnel Questions to the Minister for Foreign Affairs of the German Democratic Republic in 1990, as Deputy Head of the Organization and Management Division of the Foreign Office from 1989 to 1991, as Head of the Headquarters Inspection Unit of the Foreign Office, Director of the German-Saudi Arabian Liaison Office for Economic Affairs in Riyadh, Saudi Arabia, as German Counsul in Cairo, Egypt and as Assistant Director in the Training Centre of the Federal Foreign Service.

He joined the German Foreign Office in 1977. Previously, he served the Ministry of Interior in Land Hesse, Germany, in 1976. He was Assistant judge and assistant prosecutor in the Ministry of Justice in Land Hesse from 1973 to 1974.

He studied in the Training Centre of the Federal Foreign Office in Bonn from 1977 to 1979. He held a Postgraduate Degree in Public Administration at the Postgraduate School of Public Administration in Speyer, Germany. He passed the Second State Examination in law (Bar Examination) in 1975 and the First State Examination in law (Master's degree) in 1972. From 1967 to 1971, he studied law at the University of Marburg, Germany.
