= Holger Geffers =

German Paralympic athlete (born 1971)

Medal record

Paralympic Games

Representing Germany

Paralympic Games
Silver medal – second place	1996 Atlanta	4x100 metre relay - T44
Silver medal – second place	1996 Atlanta	4x400 metre relay - T44
Bronze medal – third place	1996 Atlanta	200 metres - T44

Holger Geffers is a paralympic athlete from Germany competing mainly in category T12 sprints events.

== Biography ==
Geffers competed in three Paralympics winning 2 silver and 1 bronze medal. Her first games were in 1992 in Barcelona where she competed in the 100m and 400m. She then won all her medals in the 1996 Summer Paralympics winning silvers as part of the German 4 × 100 m and 4 × 400 m relay teams and a bronze in the 200m as well as competing in the 100m and pentathlon. She then made her last appearance in the 2000 Summer Paralympics where she competed in the 100m, 200m, 400m, 4 × 400 m and pentathlon.
