= East Germany at the 1984 Summer Paralympics =

- Flag of the German Democratic Republic
- IPC code: GDR

in Stoke Mandeville/New York
- Competitors: 4 in 1 sport
- Medals Ranked 35th: Gold 0 Silver 3 Bronze 1 Total 4

Summer Paralympics appearances (overview)
- 1984

Other related appearances
- Germany (1960–pres.)

The German Democratic Republic (commonly known as East Germany) competed in the 1984 Summer Paralympics in Stoke Mandeville and New York City. The country entered four competitors, all in athletics.

This marked East Germany's first and only appearance at the Paralympic Games, as it never took part in the Winter Paralympics. Thus the country's tally at the 1984 Summer Games (three silver medals and one bronze) is also its all-round Paralympic Games tally.

== Medalists ==
Medal	Name	Sport	Event
Silver	Rita Gerstenberger	Athletics	Women's discus throw B1
Silver	Siegmund Hegeholz	Athletics	Men's long jump B3
Silver	Siegmund Hegeholz	Athletics	Men's pentathlon B3
Bronze	Rita Gerstenberger	Athletics	Women's javelin throw B1

== Athletics ==
Athlete	Event	Heats		Final	
Athlete	Event	Result	Rank	Result	Rank
Ralf Fox	Men's 100 m B3	12.05	3 Q	12.10	8
Ralf Fox	Men's 400 m B3	53.49	3 Q	52.88	5
Ralf Fox	Men's 800 m B3	2:07.95	2 Q	2:03.76	4
Rita Gerstenberger	Women's long jump B1	N/A		4.35	5
Rita Gerstenberger	Women's javelin throw B1	N/A		17.68	Bronze medal
Rita Gerstenberger	Women's discus throw B1	N/A		20.02	Silver medal
Siegmund Hegeholz	Men's triple jump B3	N/A		12.26	4
Siegmund Hegeholz	Men's long jump B3	N/A		6.28	Silver medal
Siegmund Hegeholz	Men's pentathlon B3	N/A		2678.0	Silver medal
Siegmund Turteltaube	Men's discus throw B1	N/A		26.21	9
Siegmund Turteltaube	Men's shot put B1	N/A		9.23	9
Siegmund Turteltaube	Men's triple jump B1	N/A		8.23	4

== See also ==
- East Germany at the Olympics
- Germany at the Paralympics
