= Thorsten Oppold =

German Paralympic athlete

Medal record

Paralympic athletics

Representing Germany

Paralympic Games
Bronze medal – third place	2000 Sydney	Marathon - T51

Thorston Oppold is a paralympic athlete from Germany competing mainly in category T51 wheelchair racing events.

Thorston competed in four events at the 2000 Summer Paralympics in Sydney he won the bronze medal in the marathon as well as competing in the 400m, 800m and 1500m. In 2004 Summer Paralympics he concentrated on the marathon but without any medal success.
