= Michaela Daamen =

German Paralympic athlete

Medal record

Paralympic athletics

Representing Germany

Paralympic Games
Gold medal – first place	2000 Sydney	Shot Put - F44

Michaela Daamen is a paralympic athlete from Germany competing mainly in category F44 shot and discus events.

Michaela has twice competed in the paralympics in 2000 and in 2004. On both occasions she competed in the shot and discus and it was in 2000 that she won her only medal a gold in the F44 shot put.
