= Martin Horn (athlete) =

German Paralympic athlete

Medal record

Paralympic athletics

Representing Germany

Paralympic Games
Bronze medal – third place	2000 Sydney	4x100 metre relay - T46

Martin Horn (born 23 September 1969) is a paralympic athlete from Germany competing mainly in category T44 sprint events.

Martin competed in the 1996 Summer Paralympics in the 100m, 200m and long jump but it was in the 2000 Summer Paralympics he won his only medal. There he competed in the 100m and was part of both the 4 × 400 m and third placed 4 × 100 m teams.

He represents the sports club LAZ Zweibrücken.
