= Britta Jänicke =

German Paralympic athlete

Medal record

Paralympic athletics

Representing Germany

Paralympic Games
Gold medal – first place	1988 Seoul	Discus Throw - A6/A8-9/L4
Gold medal – first place	1988 Seoul	Javelin Throw - A6/A8-9/L4
Gold medal – first place	2000 Sydney	Shot Put - F46
Silver medal – second place	1996 Atlanta	Shot Put - F42-44/46
Bronze medal – third place	1996 Atlanta	Discus Throw - F42-44/46
Bronze medal – third place	2000 Sydney	Discus Throw - F46

Britta Jänicke is a paralympic athlete from Germany competing mainly in category F46 throwing events.

Britta has competed in 4 paralympics. In the 1988 Summer Paralympics she won the discus and javelin gold medals. The 1992 Summer Paralympics saw a change in that Britta did the 100m but only managed to finish seventh in the final. 1996 saw Britta back in throws, competing in the javelin, winning silver in the shot put and bronze in the discus. It was these last two that she competed at in the 2000 Summer Paralympics winning the gold medal in the shot put with a world record throw and a second consecutive bronze in the discus.
