= Gerhard Wies =

German Paralympic athlete

Medal record

Paralympic athletics

Representing Germany

Paralympic Games
Silver medal – second place	2004 Athens	Shot Put - F56
Bronze medal – third place	2000 Sydney	Shot Put - F56

Gerhard Wies (born 11 April 1961) is a paralympic athlete from Germany competing mainly in category F56 throwing events.

Gerhard competed in both the 2000 and 2004 Summer Paralympics on both occasions in the shot, discus and javelin. His medal success came in the shot put, winning the bronze medal in 2000 and improving to silver in 2004.
