= National Paralympic Committee Germany =

National Paralympic Committee of Germany

National Paralympic Committee
- Country: Germany
- Code: GER
- Created: 1951
- Continental association: EPC
- Headquarters: Frechen
- President: Friedhelm Julius Beucher
- Website: www.dbs-npc.de

National Paralympic Committee Germany (German: Deutsche Behindertensportverband e.V. (DBS)) is responsible for Germany's participation in the Paralympic Games.

The DBS represents rehabilitation sports, popular sports, and professional sports.

== Football 5-a-side ==
To raise awareness, players from Bundesliga club FC Bayern Munich along with players from the Football 5-a-side national team and students from the St. Anna Gymnasiums in Augsburg participated in a promotional training session.

== See also ==
- Germany at the Paralympics
- German Olympic Sports Confederation
