= Birgit Pohl =

German Paralympic athlete (1954–2022)

Medal record

Paralympic athletics

Representing Germany

Paralympic Games
Gold medal – first place	1996 Atlanta	Shot Put – F32-33
Gold medal – first place	2000 Sydney	Discus Throw – F34
Silver medal – second place	2008 Beijing	Shot Put – F32–34/52–53
Bronze medal – third place	2008 Beijing	Javelin Throw – F33/34/52–53

Birgit Pohl (22 April 1954 – 21 June 2022) was a German Paralympian athlete competing mainly in throwing events.

== Career ==
She competed in her first Paralympics in 1996 in Atlanta, United States, where she won a gold medal in the F32–33 shot put. She returned to the 2000 Summer Paralympics in Sydney, Australia where she won a gold in the F33–34 discus throw.

After an unsuccessful 2004 games in Athens, Greece, failing to win a medal in any of her three events, discus, shot or javelin, she competed in the 2008 Summer Paralympics in Beijing, China. There she won a silver medal in the women's F32–34/52–53 shot put event and a bronze in the T33/34/52/53 javelin throw.

Pohl announced her retirement from sports in 2012. She died on 21 June 2022 at the age of 68.
