= Ralph Brunner =

German Paralympic athlete

Medal record

Paralympic athletics

Representing Germany

Paralympic Games
Bronze medal – third place	2000 Sydney	4x400 metre relay - T54

Ralph Bunner is a paralympic athlete from Germany competing mainly in category T54 wheelchair racing events.

Despite competing in five distances from 400m to marathon and the 4 × 100 m in the 2000 Summer Paralympics it was his part in the German 4 × 400 m team that won Ralph his Paralympic bronze medal. He also competed at various distances in the following two paralympics, without any further medal success.
