= Sabine Wagner =

German Paralympic athlete

Medal record

Paralympic athletics

Representing Germany

Paralympic Games
Silver medal – second place	2000 Sydney	100 metres - T44
Silver medal – second place	2000 Sydney	200 metres - T44

Sabine Wagner is a paralympic athlete from Germany competing mainly in category T46 sprint events.

Sabine has competed at two Paralympics. Her first in 2000 saw her finish second behind American Shea Cowart in both the 100m and 200m. In her second games in 2004 she failed to match this performance missing out on the medals in the 100m, 200m and long jump.
