= Sven Solbrig =

German Paralympic athlete

Medal record

Paralympic athletics

Representing Germany

Paralympic Games
Gold medal – first place	2000 Sydney	Javelin Throw - F46

Sven Solbrig is a paralympic athlete from Germany competing mainly in category F46 javelin events.

Sven has competed in the javelin at two Paralympics first in 1996 and then winning the gold medal in the F46 class in 2000.
