= Siena Christen =

German Paralympic athlete

Medal record

Women's para-athletics

Representing Germany

Paralympic Games
Bronze medal – third place	2000 Sydney	Shot put F12

World Championships
Silver medal – second place	2006 Assen	Discus throw F12
Bronze medal – third place	2006 Assen	Shot put F12

Siena Christen is a former para-athlete from Germany who competed mainly in F12 category shot put and discus throw events.

She competed in the shot put and discus events at the Paralympic Games in 2000, 2004, 2008, and 2012. In 2000, Christen won a bronze medal in the women's shot put F12 event.

At the 2006 IPC Athletics World Championships, she won a silver medal in the discus throw F12 event and a bronze medal in the shot put F12 event.
