= Yvonne Sehmisch =

German Paralympic athlete

Medal record

Track and field (athletics)

Representing Germany

Paralympic Games
Bronze medal – third place	2000 Sydney	100 metres - T44
Bronze medal – third place	2000 Sydney	200 metres - T44

Yvonne Sehmisch is a paralympic athlete from Germany competing mainly in category T54 sprint events.

Yvonne has competed in the 100 m, 200 m and 400 m at three consecutive Paralympics. She won bronze medals in the 100 m and 200 m in her first games in 2000.
