= Jessica Sachse =

German Paralympic athlete

Medal record

Paralympic athletics

Representing Germany

Paralympic Games
Gold medal – first place	1992 Barcelona	100 metres - TS4
Gold medal – first place	1992 Barcelona	200 metres - TS4
Silver medal – second place	1988 Seoul	100 metres - A6/A8-9/L4
Silver medal – second place	1988 Seoul	200 metres - A6/A8-9/L4
Silver medal – second place	1996 Atlanta	100 metres - T42-46
Bronze medal – third place	1988 Seoul	400 metres - A6/A8-9/L4
Bronze medal – third place	1988 Seoul	Javelin Throw - A6/A8-9/L4
Bronze medal – third place	2000 Sydney	Javelin Throw - F46

Jessica Sachse is a paralympic athlete from Germany competing mainly in category F46 sprints and javelin events.

Sachse competed in five Paralympics, winning medals in four of them. Her first games were in Seoul in 1988 where she won silvers in the 100m and 200m and bronzes in the 400m and javelin. By 1992 in Barcelona she was concentrating on the 100m and 200m and managed to convert her two silvers into 2 golds. 1996 Summer Paralympics in Atlanta saw Sachse return to the javelin as well as the 100m and 200m but she was only able to win a solitary silver in the 100m. Competing in the same events in 2000 resulted in just the javelin bronze medal. The 2004 Summer Paralympics were her last games and the only time she did not win a medal after competing in the 100m and javelin.
