= Rayk Haucke =

German Paralympic athlete

Medal record

Paralympic athletics

Representing Germany

Paralympic Games
Silver medal – second place	1996 Atlanta	Pentathlon - P10
Silver medal – second place	2000 Sydney	JT - F11
Bronze medal – third place	2000 Sydney	Pentathlon - P11

Rayk Haucke is a Paralympian athlete from Germany competing mainly in category P11 pentathlon events.

He competed in the 1996 Summer Paralympics in Atlanta, United States. There he won a silver medal in the men's Pentathlon - P10 event and finished fourth in the men's Javelin throw - F10 event. He also competed at the 2000 Summer Paralympics in Sydney, Australia. There he won a silver medal in the men's Javelin throw - F11 event, a bronze medal in the men's Pentathlon - P11 event and finished fourth in the men's 4 x 400 metre relay - T13 event. He also competed at the 2004 Summer Paralympics in Athens, Greece. There he finished seventh in the men's Javelin throw - F11 event and went out in the first round of the men's 4 x 100 metre relay - T11-13 event
