= Jörg Frischmann =

German Paralympic athlete

Medal record

Paralympic athletics

Representing Germany

Paralympic Games
Gold medal – first place	1992 Barcelona	Shot Put - THS2
Silver medal – second place	1992 Barcelona	Javelin Throw - THS2
Silver medal – second place	1996 Atlanta	Shot Put - F43-44
Bronze medal – third place	2000 Sydney	Shot Put - F44
Bronze medal – third place	2000 Sydney	Javelin Throw - F44

Jörg Frischmann is a Paralympic athlete from Germany. He is classified F43, and competes mainly in shot put and javelin events.

== Biography ==
Joerg has competed in the Paralympics on four occasions. His first was in Barcelona in 1992, where he won gold in the shot put and silver in the javelin. His next appearance was in 1996 where he won silver in the shot put. He also competed in the pentathlon and javelin. In 2000 he reverted to competing in the javelin and shot put, winning bronze medals in both events. His final appearance was in the 2004 Summer Paralympics where he only competed in the shot put and was unable to finish among the medals.

His 14.21 m shot put throw at the Atlanta Paralympics still stands as the T43 world record today.

After studying sport sciences at the German Sport University in Cologne, Frischmann has been working as the Director of Sport for Persons with a Disability at TSV Bayer 04 Leverkusen since 1998.
