= Robert Figl =

German Paralympic athlete

Robert Figl (born 1 June 1967 in Karlsruhe) is a German wheelchair racer, who competes at the Olympic level. At the 2004 Olympic Games, he finished first in the demonstration sport of Men's 1500m wheelchair. However, he did not qualify for the final of the same event at the 2004 Paralympics, after getting involved in a collision in the semifinal. He also participated in the Paralympic Games, competing in five consecutive Summer Paralympics from 1988 to 2004 and winning a total of five gold, one silver, and six bronze medals. At the 2000 Summer Paralympics, he won two bronze medals in the 1500 metres and 4×400 metre relay.
