= Siegmund Hegeholz =

German Paralympic athlete

Medal record

Paralympic athletics

Paralympic Games

Representing East Germany
| Silver medal – second place | 1984 Stoke Mandeville | Long Jump - B3 |
| Silver medal – second place | 1984 Stoke Mandeville | Pentathlon - B3 |

Representing Germany
| Gold medal – first place | 1992 Barcelona | Javelin Throw - B2 |
| Gold medal – first place | 2000 Sydney | Javelin Throw - F11 |
| Silver medal – second place | 1996 Atlanta | Javelin Throw - F11 |
| Silver medal – second place | 2004 Athens | Javelin Throw - F11 |

Siegmund Hegeholz is a Paralympic athlete from Germany competing mainly in category F11 javelin events.

== Biography ==
Siegmund has competed at six Paralympic Games. His first was in 1984 where he represented East Germany. He competed in triple jump and won silver medals in both the long jump and pentathlon. He then missed 1988 (East Germany did not participate) before returning for the 1992 Summer Paralympics where -now representing a reunified Germany- he won the B2 javelin as well as competing in various other events. 1996 saw Siegmund finish second in the javelin but miss out on the discus and shot put. In 2000 he won his second gold medal at javelin while 2004 saw him end up second. His sixth Paralympics saw him finish seventh in the javelin.
