= Athletics at the 2004 Summer Paralympics =

Athletics at the XII Paralympic Games
- Host stadium (shown in 2011)
- Venue: Athens Olympic Stadium
- Dates: 19–27 September 2004
- Competitors: 1064 from 116 nations

Athletics at the 2004 Summer Paralympics included 17 events for men and 15 events for women, in 5 disciplines. Athletes competed in one of four disability categories:

- Blind or visually impaired athletes – Sport classes 11 to 13.
- Intellectually disabled athletes - Sport class 20
- Athletes with cerebral palsy – Sport classes 32 to 34 (wheelchair) and 35 to 38 (standing)
- Amputee and les autres athletes – Sport classes 40 (dwarfism) and 42 to F46 (standing amputees).
- Wheelchair athletes – Sport classes 51 to 54 (track events) and 51 to 58 (field events).

== Participating countries ==
- Afghanistan (2)
- Algeria (14)
- Angola (4)
- Argentina (9)
- Australia (43)
- Austria (15)
- Azerbaijan (6)
- Bahrain (3)
- Bangladesh (1)
- Belarus (16)
- Belgium (3)
- Benin (1)
- Bosnia and Herzegovina (1)
- Botswana (1)
- Brazil (17)
- Bulgaria (6)
- Cambodia (2)
- Canada (39)
- Cape Verde (2)
- Chile (1)
- Chinese Taipei (4)
- Colombia (1)
- Ivory Coast (1)
- Croatia (6)
- Cuba (15)
- Cyprus (1)
- Czech Republic (21)
- Denmark (4)
- Dominican Republic (2)
- Ecuador (1)
- Egypt (15)
- El Salvador (2)
- Estonia (1)
- Ethiopia (1)
- Fiji (1)
- Finland (5)
- France (27)
- Germany (53)
- Ghana (2)
- Great Britain (35)
- Greece (32)
- Guatemala (2)
- Guinea (1)
- Honduras (2)
- Hong Kong (3)
- Iceland (1)
- India (10)
- Iran (28)
- Iraq (3)
- Ireland (11)
- Israel (1)
- Italy (20)
- Jamaica (4)
- Japan (34)
- Jordan (3)
- Kazakhstan (6)
- Kenya (15)
- South Korea (9)
- Kuwait (10)
- Latvia (7)
- Lesotho (1)
- Lithuania (11)
- Macau (1)
- Malaysia (2)
- Mauritania (1)
- Mauritius (2)
- Mexico (40)
- Moldova (2)
- Mongolia (2)
- Morocco (6)
- Nepal (1)
- Netherlands (9)
- New Zealand (7)
- Nicaragua (1)
- Niger (1)
- Nigeria (4)
- Norway (5)
- Pakistan (9)
- Palestine (2)
- Panama (1)
- Peru (1)
- Poland (25)
- Portugal (11)
- Puerto Rico (1)
- Qatar (1)
- Russia (24)
- Rwanda (2)
- Samoa (2)
- Saudi Arabia (2)
- Senegal (2)
- Serbia and Montenegro (2)
- Singapore (2)
- Slovakia (5)
- Slovenia (3)
- South Africa (24)
- Spain (36)
- Sri Lanka (1)
- Sudan (2)
- Suriname (2)
- Sweden (6)
- Switzerland (15)
- Tanzania (2)
- Thailand (12)
- Tonga (1)
- Tunisia (22)
- Turkey (1)
- Uganda (1)
- Ukraine (24)
- United Arab Emirates (9)
- United States (42)
- Uruguay (1)
- Venezuela (6)
- Vietnam (1)
- Zimbabwe (2)

== Medal summary ==
=== Medal table ===
Rank	Nation	Gold	Silver	Bronze	Total
1	China (CHN)	25	20	13	58
2	Australia (AUS)	10	12	9	31
3	Canada (CAN)	10	4	10	24
4	South Africa (RSA)	9	7	5	21
5	Ukraine (UKR)	9	4	8	21
6	Tunisia (TUN)	8	7	3	18
7	Czech Republic (CZE)	8	5	4	17
8	United States (USA)	7	8	11	26
9	Mexico (MEX)	7	6	4	17
10	Japan (JPN)	7	4	7	18
11	Russia (RUS)	7	3	6	16
12	Great Britain (GBR)	6	5	6	17
13	Poland (POL)	5	8	7	20
14	France (FRA)	5	6	7	18
15	Brazil (BRA)	5	6	5	16
16	Algeria (ALG)	5	2	5	12
17	Germany (GER)	4	11	9	24
18	Belarus (BLR)	4	7	4	15
19	Austria (AUT)	4	5	2	11
20	Iran (IRI)	4	2	9	15
21	Nigeria (NGR)	4	1	0	5
22	New Zealand (NZL)	4	0	1	5
23	Kenya (KEN)	3	1	3	7
24	Finland (FIN)	3	1	2	6
25	Angola (ANG)	3	0	0	3
26	Spain (ESP)	2	6	3	11
27	Switzerland (SUI)	2	5	4	11
28	Morocco (MAR)	2	4	0	6
29	Cuba (CUB)	2	2	6	10
30	Denmark (DEN)	2	1	2	5
30	Thailand (THA)	2	1	2	5
32	South Korea (KOR)	2	1	0	3
33	Italy (ITA)	1	4	4	9
34	Netherlands (NED)	1	4	2	7
35	Egypt (EGY)	1	3	5	9
36	Kuwait (KUW)	1	2	3	6
37	Hong Kong (HKG)	1	2	0	3
38	Latvia (LAT)	1	1	1	3
39	Azerbaijan (AZE)	1	1	0	2
40	Lithuania (LTU)	1	0	4	5
41	Jamaica (JAM)	1	0	1	2
41	Slovakia (SVK)	1	0	1	2
43	Botswana (BOT)	1	0	0	1
43	Chinese Taipei (TPE)	1	0	0	1
43	India (IND)	1	0	0	1
43	Zimbabwe (ZIM)	1	0	0	1
47	Greece (GRE)	0	5	2	7
48	Ireland (IRL)	0	2	1	3
48	Portugal (POR)	0	2	1	3
48	Sweden (SWE)	0	2	1	3
51	Iceland (ISL)	0	2	0	2
52	United Arab Emirates (UAE)	0	1	2	3
52	Venezuela (VEN)	0	1	2	3
54	Belgium (BEL)	0	1	1	2
54	Palestine (PLE)	0	1	1	2
54	Slovenia (SLO)	0	1	1	2
57	Bahrain (BRN)	0	1	0	1
57	Jordan (JOR)	0	1	0	1
57	Panama (PAN)	0	1	0	1
60	Croatia (CRO)	0	0	1	1
60	Puerto Rico (PUR)	0	0	1	1
60	Rwanda (RWA)	0	0	1	1
60	Serbia and Montenegro (SCG)	0	0	1	1
Totals (63 entries)		194	193	194	581

== Events ==
=== Men's events ===
Event	Gold	Silver	Bronze
100 metres T11	José Sayovo; Angola	Gautier Makunda; France	Luis Bullido; Spain
100 metres T12	Adekundo Adesoji; Nigeria	Ricardo Santana; Venezuela	Matthias Schroeder; Germany
100 metres T13	Royal Mitchell; United States	André Andrade; Brazil	Irving Bustamante; Cuba
100 metres T35	Teboho Mokgalagadi; South Africa	Jon Halldorsson; Iceland	Li Weichun; China
100 metres T36	Andriy Zhyltsov; Ukraine	Wa Wai So; Hong Kong	Mian Che; China
100 metres T37	Yang Chen; China	Lukasz Labuch; Poland	Darren Thrupp; Australia
100 metres T38	Tim Sullivan; Australia	Zhou Wenjun; China	Farhat Chida; Tunisia
100 metres T42	Wojtek Czyz; Germany	Clavel Kayitare; France	Heinrich Popow; Germany
100 metres T44	Marlon Shirley; United States	Brian Frasure; United States	Oscar Pistorius; South Africa
100 metres T46	Elliot Mujaji; Zimbabwe	Heath Francis; Australia	Sebastien Barc; France
100 metres T52	Salvador Hernandez; Mexico	Beat Bosch; Switzerland	Andre Beaudoin; Canada
100 metres T53	Suk Man Hong; South Korea	Hamad Aladwani; Kuwait	Joshua George; United States
100 metres T54	Leo Pekka Tähti; Finland	David Weir; Great Britain	Kenny van Weeghel; Netherlands
200 metres T11	José Sayovo; Angola	Luis Bullido; Spain	Oleksandr Ivanyukhin; Ukraine
200 metres T12	Adekundo Adesoji; Nigeria	Matthias Schroeder; Germany	Ricardo Santana; Venezuela
200 metres T13	André Andrade; Brazil	Nathan Meyer; South Africa	Irving Bustamante; Cuba
200 metres T35	Teboho Mokgalagadi; South Africa	Jon Halldorsson; Iceland	Lloyd Upsdell; Great Britain
200 metres T36	Wa Wai So; Hong Kong	Andriy Zhyltsov; Ukraine	Graeme Ballard; Great Britain
200 metres T37	Matt Slade; New Zealand	Yang Chen; China	Mohamed Allek; Algeria
200 metres T38	Tim Sullivan; Australia	Farhat Chida; Tunisia	Zhou Wenjun; China
200 metres T42	Wojtek Czyz; Germany	Clavel Kayitare; France	Heinrich Popow; Germany
200 metres T44	Oscar Pistorius; South Africa	Marlon Shirley; United States	Brian Frasure; United States
200 metres T46	Antônio Souza; Brazil	Sebastien Barc; France	Heath Francis; Australia
200 metres T51	Edgar Navarro; Mexico	Tim Johansson; Sweden	Alvise De Vidi; Italy
200 metres T52	André Beaudoin; Canada	Salvador Hernandez; Mexico	Beat Bosch; Switzerland
200 metres T53	Suk Man Hong; South Korea	Hamad Aladwani; Kuwait	Pichet Krungget; Thailand
200 metres T54	Leo Pekka Tähti; Finland	Kenny van Weeghel; Netherlands	David Weir; Great Britain
400 metres T11	José Sayovo; Angola	Luis Bullido; Spain	Aladji Ba; France
400 metres T12	Adekundo Adesoji; Nigeria	Li Yansong; China	Aliaksandr Kuzmichou; Belarus
400 metres T13	Royal Mitchell; United States	Conal McNamara; Ireland	José Alves; Portugal
400 metres T36	Artem Arefyev; Russia	Wa Wai So; Hong Kong	Marcin Mielczarek; Poland
400 metres T37	Oleksandr Driha; Ukraine	Yang Chen; China	Ali Al Ansari; United Arab Emirates
400 metres T38	Tim Sullivan; Australia	Malcolm Pringle; South Africa	Stephen Payton; Great Britain
400 metres T44	Danny Andrews; United States	Neil Fuller; Australia	Ryan Fann; United States
400 metres T46	Antônio Souza; Brazil	Heath Francis; Australia	Wu Faqi; China
400 metres T52	Toshihiro Takada; Japan	André Beaudoin; Canada	Thomas Geierspichler; Austria
400 metres T53	Hamad Aladwani; Kuwait	Suk Man Hong; South Korea	Joshua George; United States
400 metres T54	Kenny van Weeghel; Netherlands	Choke Yasuoka; Japan	Jeff Adams; Canada
800 metres T12	Abel Avila; Spain	Maher Bouallegue; Tunisia	Odair Santos; Brazil
800 metres T13	Tim Prendergast; New Zealand	Gilson Anjos; Brazil	Stuart McGregor; Canada
800 metres T37	Oleksandr Driha; Ukraine	Mohamed Charmi; Tunisia	Mariusz Tubielewicz; Poland
800 metres T38	Malcolm Pringle; South Africa	Abbes Saidi; Tunisia	Derek Malone; Ireland
800 metres T46	Danny Crates; Great Britain	Samir Nouioua; Algeria	Jean de Dieu Nkundabera; Rwanda
800 metres T52	Abdellah Ez Zine; Morocco	Thomas Geierspichler; Austria	Dean Bergeron; Canada
800 metres T53	Richard Colman; Australia	Adam Bleakney; United States	Jun Hiromichi; Japan
800 metres T54	Choke Yasuoka; Japan	Ernst van Dyk; South Africa	Marcel Hug; Switzerland
1500 metres T11	Mustapha El Aouzari; Morocco	Jason Dunkerley; Canada	Omar Benchiheb; Algeria
1500 metres T13	Maher Bouallegue; Tunisia	Odair Santos; Brazil	Emanuel Asinikal; Kenya
1500 metres T36	Artem Arefyev; Russia	José Pampano; Spain	Cheng En He; China
1500 metres T37	Mohamed Charmi; Tunisia	Oleksandr Driha; Ukraine	Khaled Hanani; Algeria
1500 metres T46	Samir Nouioua; Algeria	Abdelghani Gtaib; Morocco	Mohamed Aissaoui; Algeria
1500 metres T52	Thomas Geierspichler; Austria	Santiago Sanz; Spain	Toshihiro Takada; Japan
1500 metres T54	Saúl Mendoza; Mexico	Ernst van Dyk; South Africa	Marcel Hug; Switzerland
5000 metres T11	Henry Wanyoike; Kenya	Mustapha El Aouzari; Morocco	Frangs Karanja; Kenya
5000 metres T12	Maher Bouallegue; Tunisia	Odair Santos; Brazil	Emanuel Asinikal; Kenya
5000 metres T13	Joseph Ngorialuk; Kenya	Said Gomez; Panama	Yunieski Abreu; Cuba
5000 metres T46	Samir Nouioua; Algeria	Javier Conde; Spain	Ozivam Bonfim; Brazil
5000 metres T52	Toshihiro Takada; Japan	Thomas Geierspichler; Austria	Santiago Sanz; Spain
5000 metres T54	Kurt Fearnley; Australia	Aaron Gordian; Mexico	Ernst van Dyk; South Africa
10000 metres T11	Henry Wanyoike; Kenya	Carlos Ferreira; Portugal	Andrea Cionna; Italy
10000 metres T13	Maher Bouallegue; Tunisia	Diosmani Gonzalez; Cuba	Kestutis Bartkenas; Lithuania
10000 metres T54	Joel Jeannot; France	Prawat Wahorum; Thailand	Rawat Tana; Thailand
Marathon T11	Yuichi Takahashi; Japan	Carlos Ferreira; Portugal	Andrea Cionna; Italy
Marathon T13	Ildar Pomykalov; Russia	Roy Daniell; Australia	Linas Balsys; Lithuania
Marathon T51	Alvise De Vidi; Italy	Stefan Strobel; Germany	Edgar Navarro; Mexico
Marathon T52	Toshihiro Takada; Japan	Thomas Geierspichler; Austria	Clayton Gerein; Canada
Marathon T54	Kurt Fearnley; Australia	Kelly Smith; Canada	Tomasz Hamerlak; Poland
4×100 metre relay T11-T13	China (CHN); Duan Qifeng; Li Yansong; Li Qiang; Xiang Wu	Cuba (CUB); Enrique Cepeda; Irving Bustamante; Adrian Iznaga; Fernando Gonzalez	Venezuela (VEN); Anibal Bello; Oduver Daza; Ricardo Santana; José Villarreal
4×100 metre relay T35-T38	Australia (AUS); Tim Sullivan; Benjamin Hall; Darren Thrupp; Paul Benz	China (CHN); Zhou Wenjun; Yang Chen; Lü Yi; Mian Che	Ukraine (UKR); Andriy Onufriyenko; Serhiy Norenko; Oleksandr Driha; Andriy Zhyltsov
4×100 metre relay T42-T46	United States (USA); Brian Frasure; Danny Andrews; Casey Tibbs; Raphew Reed Jr	France (FRA); Dominique Andre; Serge Ornem; Sebastien Barc; Xavier le Draoullec	Australia (AUS); Don Elgin; Neil Fuller; Stephen Wilson; Heath Francis
4×100 metre relay T53/T54	Thailand (THA); Prawat Wahorum; Supachai Koysub; Rawat Tana; Pichet Krungget	Australia (AUS); Richard Colman; Richard Nicholson; Kurt Fearnley; Geoff Trappett	France (FRA); Ludovic Gapenne; Pierre Fairbank; Claude Issorat; Hubert Locco
4×400 metre relay T35-T38	Tunisia (TUN); Farhat Chida; Fares Hamdi; Mohamed Charmi; Abbes Saidi	China (CHN); Yang Chen; Lü Yi; Zhou Wenjun; Mian Che	Ukraine (UKR); Oleksandr Driha; Serhiy Norenko; Andriy Onufriyenko; Andriy Zhyltsov
4×400 metre relay T42-T46	United States (USA); Brian Frasure; Ryan Fann; Raphew Reed Jr; Danny Andrews	Australia (AUS); Neil Fuller; Don Elgin; Heath Francis; Stephen Wilson	France (FRA); Xavier le Draoullec; Emmanuel Lacroix; Dominique Andre; Sebastien Barc
4×400 metre relay T53/T54	Thailand (THA); Rawat Tana; Pichet Krungget; Supachai Koysub; Prawat Wahorum	France (FRA); Joel Jeannot; Pierre Fairbank; Eric Teurnier; Claude Issorat	Japan (JPN); Masazumi Soejima; Susumu Kangawa; Yoshifumi Nagao; Choke Yasuoka
High jump F42	Bin Hou; China	Wei Zhong Guo; China	Dennis Wliszczak; Austria
High jump F44/46	Yancong Wu; China	Jeff Skiba; United States	Qiu Hong Wang; China
Long jump F11	Li Duan; China	Elexis Gillette; United States	Sergey Sevostianov; Russia
Long jump F12	Oleg Panyutin; Azerbaijan	Hilton Langenhoven; South Africa	Duan Qifeng; China
Long jump F13	Ángel Jimenez; Cuba	Ihar Fartunau; Belarus	Mohammed Fannouna; Palestine
Long jump F36-38	Guo Wei; China	Xin Han Fu; China	Darren Thrupp; Australia
Long jump F42	Wojtek Czyz; Germany	Stefano Lippi; Italy	Heinrich Popow; Germany
Long jump F44	Urs Kolly; Switzerland	Roberto La Barbera; Italy	Marlon Shirley; United States
Long jump F46	Anton Skachkov; Ukraine	Mohammed Dif; Morocco	Arnaud Assoumani; France
Triple jump F11	Li Duan; China	Zeynidin Bilalov; Azerbaijan	Sergey Sevostianov; Russia
Triple jump F12	Duan Qifeng; China	Aliaksandr Kuzmichou; Belarus	Ivan Kytsenko; Ukraine
Triple jump F46	Anton Skachkov; Ukraine	Wen Jie Mai; China	Hong Wei Zhang; China
Shot put F11	David Casinos; Spain	Willibald Monschein; Austria	Volodymyr Piddubnyy; Ukraine
Shot put F13	Hai Tao Sun; China	Alexander Yasinovyi; Ukraine	Russell Short; Australia
Shot put F32	Karim Betina; Algeria	Mana Abdulla Sulaiman; United Arab Emirates	Dhari Almutairi; Kuwait
Shot put F33/34	Roman Musil; Czech Republic	Hamish Macdonald; Australia	Mohsen Amoo-Aghaei; Iran
Shot put F35	Guo Wei; China	Edgars Bergs; Latvia	Thierry Cibone; France
Shot put F36	Pawel Piotrowski; Poland	Willem Noorduin; Netherlands	Nicholas Larionow; Australia
Shot put F37	Tomasz Blatkiewicz; Poland	Ahmed Meshaima; Bahrain	Robert Chyra; Poland
Shot put F38	Oleksandr Doroshenko; Ukraine	Thomas Loosch; Germany	Dusan Grezl; Czech Republic
Shot put F40	Marek Margoc; Slovakia	Lutz Langer; Germany	Asghar Zareeinejad; Iran
Shot put F42	Fanie Lombaard; South Africa	Viktar Khilmonchyk; Belarus	Mehrdad Karamzadeh; Iran
Shot put F44/46	Jackie Christiansen; Denmark	Edwin Cockrell; United States	Gerdan Fonseca; Cuba
Shot put F52	Peter Martin; New Zealand	Georgios Karaminas; Greece	Rico Glagla; Germany
Shot put F53	Mauro Maximo de Jesus; Mexico	Husam Azzam; Palestine	Christos Angourakis; Greece
Shot put F54	Georg Tischler; Austria	Rene Schwarz; Austria	Markku Niinimaki; Finland
Shot put F56	Krzysztof Smorszczewski; Poland	Gerhard Wies; Germany	Rene Nielsen; Denmark
Shot put F57	Michael Louwrens; South Africa	Jamil Elshebli; Jordan	Julius Hutka; Slovakia
Shot put F58	Ibrahim Allam; Egypt	Janusz Rokicki; Poland	Hany Elbehiry; Egypt
Discus throw F12	Hai Tao Sun; China	Vladimir Andryushchenko; Russia	Rolandas Urbonas; Lithuania
Discus throw F13	Alexander Yasinovyi; Ukraine	Hakim Yahiaoui; Algeria	Siarhei Hrybanan; Belarus
Discus throw F32/51	Radim Beles; Czech Republic	John McCarthy; Ireland	Dave Gale; Great Britain
Discus throw F33/34	Siamak Saleh-Farajzadeh; Iran	Dan West; Great Britain	Mohammad Bin Dabbas; United Arab Emirates
Discus throw F35	Feng Yan; China	Xin Han Fu; China	Edgars Bergs; Latvia
Discus throw F36	Milan Kubala; Czech Republic	Willem Noorduin; Netherlands	Duane Strydom; South Africa
Discus throw F37	Tomasz Blatkiewicz; Poland	Haissem Ben Halima; Tunisia	Mostafa Ahmed; Egypt
Discus throw F38	Oleksandr Doroshenko; Ukraine	Javad Hardani; Iran	Thomas Loosch; Germany
Discus throw F42	Fanie Lombaard; South Africa	Gino de Keersmaeker; Belgium	Algirdas Tatulis; Lithuania
Discus throw F44/46	Dan Greaves; Great Britain	Jackie Christiansen; Denmark	Si Lao Ha; China
Discus throw F52	Aigars Apinis; Latvia	Rico Glagla; Germany	Peter Martin; New Zealand
Discus throw F53	Alphanso Cunningham; Jamaica	Toshie Oi; Japan	Mohamed Hassani; Egypt
Discus throw F54	Fan Liang; China	Efthymios Kalaras; Greece	Frantisek Purgl; Czech Republic
Discus throw F55	Martin Němec; Czech Republic	Jalil Bagheri Jeddi; Iran	Mokhtar Nourafshan; Iran
Discus throw F56	Mohammad Sadeghi Mehryar; Iran	Miroslav Sperk; Czech Republic	Tanto Campbell; Jamaica
Discus throw F57	Rostislav Pohlmann; Czech Republic	Zheng Weihai; China	Hossam Abd Ellattif; Egypt
Discus throw F58	Yong Gang Chen; China	Mahmoud Elatar; Egypt	Alireza Kamali; Iran
Javelin throw F11	Bil Marinkovic; Austria	Siegmund Hegeholz; Germany	Mineho Ozaki; Japan
Javelin throw F12	Aliaksandr Tryputs; Belarus	Miroslaw Pych; Poland	Milos Grlica; Serbia and Montenegro
Javelin throw F13	Chih Chung Chiang; Chinese Taipei	Bo Quan Zhou; China	France Gagne; Canada
Javelin throw F35	Guo Wei; China	Fabian Michaels; South Africa	Thierry Cibone; France
Javelin throw F36/38	Nicholas Newman; South Africa	Pawel Piotrowski; Poland	Oleksandr Doroshenko; Ukraine
Javelin throw F37	Ken Churchill; Great Britain	Kieran Ault; Australia	Jacek Przebierala; Poland
Javelin throw F42	Jakob Mathiasen; Denmark	Fanie Lombaard; South Africa	Vahab Saalabi; Iran
Javelin throw F44/46	Devendra Jhajharia; India	Ming Jie Gao; China	Dai Chen Wang; China
Javelin throw F52/53	Peter Martin; New Zealand	Adrian Paz Velazquez; Mexico	Abdolreza Jokar; Iran
Javelin throw F54	Luis Zepeda; Mexico	Rauno Saunavaara; Finland	Avaz Azmoudeh; Iran
Javelin throw F55/56	Ali Naderi; Iran	Pieter Gruijters; Netherlands	Ying Bin Zhang; China
Javelin throw F57	Mohammad Reza Mirzaei; Iran	Ibrahim Ali; Egypt	Rostislav Pohlmann; Czech Republic
Javelin throw F58	Silver Ezeikpe; Nigeria	Mahmoud Elatar; Egypt	Alexis Pizarro; Puerto Rico
Club throw F32/51	Stephen Miller; Great Britain	Radim Beles; Czech Republic	Karim Betina; Algeria
Pentathlon P13	Ihar Fartunau; Belarus	Aliaksandr Tryputs; Belarus	Kurt van Raefelghem; Belgium
Pentathlon P44	Urs Kolly; Switzerland	Casey Tibbs; United States	Don Elgin; Australia
Pentathlon P54-58	Yong Ling; China	Pieter Gruijters; Netherlands	Rene Nielsen; Denmark

=== Women's events ===
Event	Gold	Silver	Bronze
100 metres T11	Ádria Santos; Brazil	Chun Miao Wu; China	Paraskevi Kantza; Greece
100 metres T12	Assia El Hannouni; France	Volha Zinkevich; Belarus	Maria José Alves; Brazil
100 metres T13	Olga Semenova; Russia	Anthi Karagianni; Greece	Ana Jimenez; Cuba
100 metres T34	Chelsea Clark; Canada	Chelsea Lariviere; Canada	Debbie Brennan; Great Britain
100 metres T36	Wang Fang; China	Hazel Robson; Great Britain	Yuki Kato; Japan
100 metres T37	Oksana Krechunyak; Ukraine	Isabelle Foerder; Germany	Lisa McIntosh; Australia
100 metres T46	Amy Winters; Australia	Anna Szymul; Poland	Elena Chistilina; Russia
100 metres T53	Tanni Grey-Thompson; Great Britain	Francesca Porcellato; Italy	Angie Ballard; Australia
100 metres T54	Chantal Petitclerc; Canada	Tatyana McFadden; United States	Manuela Schar; Switzerland
200 metres T11	Chun Miao Wu; China	Ádria Santos; Brazil	Purificacion Santamarta; Spain
200 metres T12	Assia El Hannouni; France	Volha Zinkevich; Belarus	Maria José Alves; Brazil
200 metres T34	Chelsea Clark; Canada	Debbie Brennan; Great Britain	Noriko Arai; Japan
200 metres T36	Wang Fang; China	Hazel Robson; Great Britain	Eriko Kikuchi; Japan
200 metres T37	Evgenia Trushnikova; Russia	Lisa McIntosh; Australia	Isabelle Foerder; Germany
200 metres T46	Amy Winters; Australia	Anna Szymul; Poland	Elena Chistilina; Russia
200 metres T52	Lisa Franks; Canada	Pia Schmid; Switzerland	Letícia Torres; Mexico
200 metres T54	Chantal Petitclerc; Canada	Manuela Schar; Switzerland	Tatyana McFadden; United States
400 metres T12	Assia El Hannouni; France	Ádria Santos; Brazil	Terezinha Guilhermina; Brazil
400 metres T13	Olga Semenova; Russia	Anthi Karagianni; Greece	Ilse Hayes; South Africa
400 metres T38	Katrina Webb; Australia	Wang Fang; China	Inna Dyachenko; Ukraine
400 metres T46	Tshotlego Morama; Botswana	Anna Szymul; Poland	Alicja Fiodorow; Poland
400 metres T52	Lisa Franks; Canada	Lucia Sosa; Mexico	Letícia Torres; Mexico
400 metres T53	Tanni Grey-Thompson; Great Britain	Madelene Nordlund; Sweden	Francesca Porcellato; Italy
400 metres T54	Chantal Petitclerc; Canada	Louise Sauvage; Australia	Diane Roy; Canada
800 metres T12	Assia El Hannouni; France	Rima Batalova; Russia	Elena Pautova; Russia
800 metres T53	Cheri Blauwet; United States	Francesca Porcellato; Italy	Madelene Nordlund; Sweden
800 metres T54	Chantal Petitclerc; Canada	Louise Sauvage; Australia	Jessica Matassa; Canada
1500 metres T12	Elena Pautova; Russia	Julia Longorkaye; Kenya	Rima Batalova; Russia
1500 metres T54	Chantal Petitclerc; Canada	Edith Hunkeler; Switzerland	Diane Roy; Canada
5000 metres T54	Wakako Tsuchida; Japan	Edith Hunkeler; Switzerland	Cheri Blauwet; United States
Marathon T54	Kazu Hatanaka; Japan	Wakako Tsuchida; Japan	Cheri Blauwet; United States
Long jump F12	Volha Zinkevich; Belarus	Rosalia Lazaro; Spain	Hanna Kaniuk; Belarus
Long jump F13	Ana Jimenez; Cuba	Anthi Karagianni; Greece	Aksana Sivitskaya; Belarus
Long jump F42	Hai Yuan Zhang; China	Christine Wolf; Germany	Perla Bustamante; Mexico
Long jump F44/46	Andrea Scherney; Austria	Wang Juan; China	April Holmes; United States
Shot put F12	Tamara Sivakova; Belarus	Hong Yan Xu; China	Jodi Willis; Australia
Shot put F32-34/52/53	Maria Salas; Mexico	Tetyana Yakybchuk; Ukraine	Maha Alsheraian; Kuwait
Shot put F35/36	Veronika Foltova; Czech Republic	Renata Chilewska; Poland	Alla Malchyk; Ukraine
Shot put F37/38	Aldona Grigaliuniene; Lithuania	Vladimira Bujarkova; Czech Republic	Eva Berna; Czech Republic
Shot put F40	Afrah Gomdi; Tunisia	Laila El Garaa; Morocco	Enna Ben Abidi; Tunisia
Shot put F42-46	Zheng Baozhu; China	Perla Bustamante; Mexico	Noralvis de Las Heras; Cuba
Shot put F54/55	Marianne Buggenhagen; Germany	Eva Kacanu; Czech Republic	Tatjana Majcen; Slovenia
Shot put F56-58	Nadia Medjemedj; Algeria	Ling Li; China	Martina Willing; Germany
Discus throw F13	Hong Yan Xu; China	Tamara Sivakova; Belarus	Courtney Knight; Canada
Discus throw F32-34/51-53	Martina Kniezkova; Czech Republic	Kyoko Sato; Japan	Maha Alsheraian; Kuwait
Discus throw F35/36/38	Veronika Foltova; Czech Republic	Xu Hong Bai; China	Renata Chilewska; Poland
Discus throw F37	Chun Hua Li; China	Amanda Fraser; Australia	Fatma Kachroudi; Tunisia
Discus throw F40	Enna Ben Abidi; Tunisia	Afrah Gomdi; Tunisia	Jill Kennedy; United States
Discus throw F42-46	Zheng Baozhu; China	Claudia Biene; Germany	Jelena Vukovic; Croatia
Discus throw F54/55	Wang Ting; China	Marianne Buggenhagen; Germany	Li Ping Chen; China
Discus throw F56-58	Suely Guimarães; Brazil	Ling Li; China	Azam Khodayari; Iran
Javelin throw F33/34/52/53	Esther Rivera; Mexico	Maria Salas; Mexico	Tiina Ala Aho; Finland
Javelin throw F35-38	Renata Chilewska; Poland	Veronika Foltova; Czech Republic	Beverly Mashinini; South Africa
Javelin throw F40	Afrah Gomdi; Tunisia	Enna Ben Abidi; Tunisia	Jill Kennedy; United States
Javelin throw F42-46	Marjaana Vare; Finland	Natalia Goudkova; Russia	Andrea Hegen; Germany
Javelin throw F54/55	Zanele Situ; South Africa	Tatjana Majcen; Slovenia	Li Ping Chen; China
Javelin throw F56-58	Sofia Djelal; Algeria	Eucharia Njideka Iyiazi; Nigeria	Aziza Hussein; Egypt

== See also ==
- Athletics at the 2004 Summer Olympics
- Wheelchair racing at the 2004 Summer Olympics
