= Athletics at the 2004 Summer Paralympics – Men's 200 metres T11–13 =

Paralympic athletics event

Men's 200m races for blind & visually impaired athletes at the 2004 Summer Paralympics were held in the Athens Olympic Stadium. Events were held in three disability classes.

== T11 ==
Men's 200m T11 at the XII Paralympic Games
- Venue: Athens Olympic Stadium
- Dates: 23–24 September 2004
- Competitors: 19 from 14 nations
- Winning time: 22.73

Medalists
1st place, gold medalist(s)		Jose Armando Sayovo	Angola
2nd place, silver medalist(s)		Luís Bullido	Spain
3rd place, bronze medalist(s)		Oleksandr Ivanyukhin	Ukraine

The T11 event consisted of 5 heats, 3 semifinals and A & B finals. It was won by Jose Armando Sayovo, representing Angola.

=== 1st Round ===
Qualified for next round

Heat 1

23 Sept. 2004, 11:25

Rank	Athlete	Time	Notes
1	Jose Armando Sayovo (ANG)	23.04	WR Q
2	Chijoke O. Kingsley (NGR)	24.20	q
3	Koji Saito (JPN)	24.64	

Heat 2

23 Sept. 2004, 11:31

Rank	Athlete	Time	Notes
1	Carlos Lopes (POR)	23.97	Q
2	Adrian Iznaga (CUB)	23.97	q
3	Xavi Porras (ESP)	24.61	
	Lorenzo Ricci (ITA)	DNS	

Heat 3

23 Sept. 2004, 11:37

Rank	Athlete	Time	Notes
1	Luís Bullido (ESP)	24.16	Q
2	Hichem Fellahi (ALG)	24.84	q
3	Paul Harpur (AUS)	24.92	
4	Angelo Londaca (ANG)	25.17	

Heat 4

23 Sept. 2004, 11:43

Rank	Athlete	Time	Notes
1	Oleksandr Ivanyukhin (UKR)	23.86	Q
2	Wu Xiang (CHN)	24.11	q
3	Aladji Ba (FRA)	24.16	q
4	Shigeki Yano (JPN)	24.39	q

Heat 5

23 Sept. 2004, 11:49

Rank	Athlete	Time	Notes
1	Hilario Moreira (BRA)	24.29	Q
2	Firmino Baptista (POR)	24.34	q
3	Joseph Aukward (USA)	25.79	
	Gautier Makunda (FRA)	DNS	

=== Semifinals ===
Heat 1

23 Sept. 2004, 21:55

Rank	Athlete	Time	Notes
1	Jose Armando Sayovo (ANG)	23.09	Q
2	Adrian Iznaga (CUB)	23.89	q
3	Wu Xiang (CHN)	24.19	
4	Shigeki Yano (JPN)	24.36	

Heat 2

23 Sept. 2004, 22:01

Rank	Athlete	Time	Notes
1	Oleksandr Ivanyukhin (UKR)	23.87	Q
2	Hilario Moreira (BRA)	24.06	
3	Firmino Baptista (POR)	24.07	
4	Chijoke O. Kingsley (NGR)	24.38	

Heat 3

23 Sept. 2004, 22:07

Rank	Athlete	Time	Notes
1	Luís Bullido (ESP)	23.81	Q
2	Carlos Lopes (POR)	23.91	
3	Hichem Fellahi (ALG)	24.08	
4	Aladji Ba (FRA)	24.41	

=== Final Round ===
Final A

24 Sept. 2004, 17:40

Rank	Athlete	Time	Notes
1st place, gold medalist(s)	Jose Armando Sayovo (ANG)	22.73	WR
2nd place, silver medalist(s)	Luís Bullido (ESP)	23.26	
3rd place, bronze medalist(s)	Oleksandr Ivanyukhin (UKR)	23.37	
4	Adrian Iznaga (CUB)	23.78	

Final B

24 Sept. 2004, 17:30

Rank	Athlete	Time	Notes
1	Firmino Baptista (POR)	24.04	
2	Hilario Moreira (BRA)	24.30	
	Carlos Lopes (POR)	DNF	
	Hichem Fellahi (ALG)	DNS	

== T12 ==
Men's 200m T12 at the XII Paralympic Games
- Venue: Athens Olympic Stadium
- Dates: 24–26 September 2004
- Competitors: 28 from 24 nations
- Winning time: 21.78

Medalists
1st place, gold medalist(s)		Adekundo Adesoji	Nigeria
2nd place, silver medalist(s)		Matthias Schroeder	Germany
3rd place, bronze medalist(s)		Ricardo Santana	Venezuela

The T12 event consisted of 7 heats, 3 semifinals and A & B finals. It was won by Adekundo Adesoji, representing Nigeria.

=== 1st Round ===
Qualified for next round

Heat 1

24 Sept. 2004, 11:35

Rank	Athlete	Time	Notes
1	Adekundo Adesoji (NGR)	21.77	WR Q
2	Hilton Langenhoven (RSA)	22.62	q
3	Goran Zezelj (CRO)	23.53	
4	Aliaksandr Batsian (BLR)	24.24	

Heat 2

24 Sept. 2004, 11:41

Rank	Athlete	Time	Notes
1	Matthias Schroeder (GER)	22.23	Q
2	Li Qiang (CHN)	22.96	q
	Omar Turro (CUB)	DNF	
	Oleg Panyutin (AZE)	DNF	

Heat 3

24 Sept. 2004, 11:47

Rank	Athlete	Time	Notes
1	Gabriel Potra (POR)	23.30	Q
2	Ioannis Stavridis (GRE)	23.70	
	Daniel Wozniak (POL)	DNF	
	Redouane Merah (ALG)	DNS	

Heat 4

24 Sept. 2004, 11:53

Rank	Athlete	Time	Notes
1	Li Yansong (CHN)	22.95	Q
2	Igor Pashchenko (UKR)	23.51	
3	Chararn Kajornvech (THA)	24.04	
4	Breylin Martinez (DOM)	26.29	

Heat 5

24 Sept. 2004, 11:59

Rank	Athlete	Time	Notes
1	Aliaksandr Kuzmichou (BLR)	22.94	Q
2	Abdulhadi Al Yousef (KSA)	23.64	
3	Juan Antonio Nogales (ESP)	23.65	
4	Julio Souza (BRA)	57.89	

Heat 6

24 Sept. 2004, 12:05

Rank	Athlete	Time	Notes
1	Francisco Jose Sanchez (ESP)	23.36	Q
2	Nelacey Porter (USA)	23.38	q
3	José Villarreal (VEN)	23.50	q
4	Richard Souci (MRI)	24.80	

Heat 7

24 Sept. 2004, 12:11

Rank	Athlete	Time	Notes
1	Ricardo Santana (VEN)	22.55	Q
2	Andrey Koptev (RUS)	23.12	q
3	Mohd Hisham Khaironi (MAS)	23.63	
4	Matteo Tassetti (ITA)	24.41	

=== Semifinals ===
Heat 1

25 Sept. 2004, 12:00

Rank	Athlete	Time	Notes
1	Adekundo Adesoji (NGR)	22.02	Q
2	Francisco Jose Sanchez (ESP)	23.26	
3	Gabriel Potra (POR)	23.34	
4	José Villarreal (VEN)	23.59	

Heat 2

25 Sept. 2004, 12:06

Rank	Athlete	Time	Notes
1	Matthias Schroeder (GER)	21.74	Q
2	Li Yansong (CHN)	22.15	q
3	Hilton Langenhoven (RSA)	22.49	
4	Nelacey Porter (USA)	22.66	

Heat 3

25 Sept. 2004, 12:12

Rank	Athlete	Time	Notes
1	Ricardo Santana (VEN)	22.54	Q
2	Aliaksandr Kuzmichou (BLR)	22.68	
3	Li Qiang (CHN)	22.73	
4	Andrey Koptev (RUS)	23.71	

=== Final Round ===
Final A

26 Sept. 2004, 19:51

Rank	Athlete	Time	Notes
1st place, gold medalist(s)	Adekundo Adesoji (NGR)	21.78	
2nd place, silver medalist(s)	Matthias Schroeder (GER)	21.91	
3rd place, bronze medalist(s)	Ricardo Santana (VEN)	22.46	
4	Li Yansong (CHN)	22.53	

Final B

26 Sept. 2004, 19:45

Rank	Athlete	Time	Notes
1	Li Qiang (CHN)	22.81	
2	Nelacey Porter (USA)	23.06	
3	Aliaksandr Kuzmichou (BLR)	23.08	
	Hilton Langenhoven (RSA)	DNS	

== T13 ==
Men's 200m T13 at the XII Paralympic Games
- Venue: Athens Olympic Stadium
- Dates: 19–20 September 2004
- Competitors: 12 from 12 nations
- Winning time: 22.70

Medalists
1st place, gold medalist(s)		Andre Andrade	Brazil
2nd place, silver medalist(s)		Nathan Meyer	South Africa
3rd place, bronze medalist(s)		Irving Bustamante	Cuba

The T13 event consisted of 2 heats and a final. It was won by Andre Andrade, representing Brazil.

=== 1st Round ===
Qualified for next round

Heat 1

19 Sept. 2004, 17:30

Rank	Athlete	Time	Notes
1	Andre Andrade (BRA)	22.40	Q
2	Royal Mitchell (USA)	22.45	Q
3	Ioannis Protos (GRE)	22.71	Q
4	José Alves (POR)	22.92	q
5	Yuriy Gornak (AZE)	23.05	q
6	Kordian Galinski (POL)	23.59	

Heat 2

19 Sept. 2004, 17:36

Rank	Athlete	Time	Notes
1	Nathan Meyer (RSA)	22.67	Q
2	Irving Bustamante (CUB)	23.05	Q
3	Aldo Manganaro (ITA)	23.30	Q
4	Conal McNamara (IRL)	23.58	
5	Ihar Fartunau (BLR)	25.20	
6	Shahzad Muhammad (PAK)	27.32	

=== Final Round ===
20 Sept. 2004, 18:00

Rank	Athlete	Time	Notes
1st place, gold medalist(s)	Andre Andrade (BRA)	22.70	
2nd place, silver medalist(s)	Nathan Meyer (RSA)	22.96	
3rd place, bronze medalist(s)	Irving Bustamante (CUB)	23.04	
4	Ioannis Protos (GRE)	23.24	
5	Yuriy Gornak (AZE)	23.53	
6	Aldo Manganaro (ITA)	23.63	
	José Alves (POR)	DNF	
	Royal Mitchell (USA)	DSQ	
