= List of Paralympic medalists in the 400 metres =

400m sprint events began in the 1976 Summer Paralympics was open to both male and female wheelchair competitors. In the 1980 Summer Paralympics, able bodied competitors also took part in this event.

== Men's medal summaries ==
=== Ambulant athletes ===
Class	Year	Gold	Silver	Bronze
C	1980	Jurgen Johann; West Germany	Karl Brunner; Austria	Joe Egan; Australia
C1	1980	Alois Karner; Austria	Mieczyslaw Maminski; Poland	No bronze medalist
C6	1984	Colin Keay; Great Britain	Gordon Robertson; Great Britain	Andre Havard; France
C6	1988	Colin Keay; Great Britain	Gordon Robertson; Great Britain	Monaam Elabed; Tunisia
C6	1992	Kim Du-chun; South Korea	Michael Lagasse; United States	Eric Stenback; United States
C7	1984	Rudolf Kocmut; Yugoslavia	Robert Mearns; Canada	Haukur Gunnarsson; Iceland
C7	1988	Kang Sung Kook; South Korea	Brad Hill; Australia	Haukur Gunnarsson; Iceland
C7	1992	Peter Haber; Germany	Kang Sung Kook; South Korea	Ahmed Hassan Mahmoud; Egypt
C8	1988	Thomas Dietz; United States	Robert Biancucci; Australia	José Rebelo; Portugal
C8	1992	Frank Bruno; Canada	Javier Salmerón; Spain	José Manuel González; Spain
T20	2000	Juan Lopez; Spain	Allan Stuart; Great Britain	Andrew Newell; Australia
T20	2016	Daniel Martins; Brazil	Luis Arturo Paiva; Venezuela	Gracelino Barbosa; Cape Verde
T20	2020	Charles-Antoine Kouakou; France	Luis Felipe Rodriguez Bolivar; Venezuela	Columba Blango; Great Britain
T20	2024	Jhon Obando; Colombia	David José Pineda Mejía; Spain	Yovanni Philippe; Mauritius
T34-35	1996	Kim Du-chun; South Korea	Fernando Gomez; Spain	Richard Collins; Great Britain
T36	1996	Ahmed Hassan Mahmoud; Egypt	Lamouri Rahmouni; France	Yiu Cheung Cheung; Hong Kong
T36	2000	So Wa Wai; Hong Kong	Ahmed Saif Zaal Abu Muhair; United Arab Emirates	Serhiy Norenko; Ukraine
T36	2004	Artem Arefyev; Russia	So Wa Wai; Hong Kong	Marcin Mielczarek; Poland
T36	2008	Roman Pavlyk; Ukraine	Artem Arefyev; Russia	Che Mian; China
T36	2012	Evgenii Shvetcov; Russia	Paul Blake; Great Britain	Roman Pavlyk; Ukraine
T36	2016	Paul Blake; Great Britain	Roman Pavlyk; Ukraine	William Stedman; New Zealand
T36	2020	James Turner; Australia	Evgenii Shvetcov; RPC	William Stedman; New Zealand
T37	1996	Stephen Payton; Great Britain	Malcolm Pringle; South Africa	José Manuel González; Spain
T37	2000	Mohamed Allek; Algeria	Ahmed Hassan Mahmoud; Egypt	Lamouri Rahmouni; France
T37	2004	Oleksandr Driha; Ukraine	Yang Chen; China	Ali Qambar Al Ansari; United Arab Emirates
T37	2016	Charl du Toit; South Africa	Omar Monterola; Venezuela	Sofiane Hamdi; Algeria
T37	2020	Andrey Vdovin; RPC	Nick Mayhugh; United States	Chermen Kobesov; RPC
T38	2000	Tim Sullivan; Australia	Stephen Payton; Great Britain	Malcolm Pringle; South Africa
T38	2004	Tim Sullivan; Australia	Malcolm Pringle; South Africa	Stephen Payton; Great Britain
T38	2008	Farhat Chida; Tunisia	Abbes Saidi; Tunisia	Andriy Onufriyenko; Ukraine
T38	2012	Farhat Chida; Tunisia	Zhou Wenjun; China	Union Sekailwe; South Africa
T38	2016	Dyan Buis; South Africa	Hu Jianwen; China	Weiner Díaz; Colombia
T38	2020	Jose Rodolfo Chessani; Mexico	Mohamed Farhat Chida; Tunisia	Zachary Gingras; Canada
T38	2024	Jaydin Blackwell; United States	Ryan Medrano; United States	Juan Campas; Colombia

=== Amputee athletes ===
Class	Year	Gold	Silver	Bronze
A4	1984	Kazimierz Suchocki; Poland	Stephen Sargolia; Australia	Jurgen Johann; West Germany
A5	1984	Jerzy Szlezak; Poland	Matthias Berg; West Germany	Slobodan Adzic; Yugoslavia
A5/A7	1988	Jeff Tiessen; Canada	Jerzy Szlezak; Poland	Slobodan Adzic; Yugoslavia
A6	1984	Harri Jauhiainen; Finland	John Watson; Great Britain	Peter Kirby; Australia
A6/A8/A9/L4	1988	Harri Jauhiainen; Finland	Nigel Coultas; Great Britain	Kim Duk Ki; South Korea
D	1980	Joe Harrison; Canada	K. Will; West Germany	K. Wagner; West Germany
D1 (runners)	1980	Walter Fink; Austria	Only one competitor	
E	1980	Harri Jauhiainen; Finland	Jan Krauz; Poland	R. Lindberg; Finland
E1	1980	Cato Zahl Pedersen; Norway	Yekutiel Gershoni; Israel	No bronze medalist
F	1980	Marian Wierbicki; Poland	Wayne Lanham; Australia	Gerhard Kolm; Austria
F1	1980	Matthias Berg; West Germany	R. Scharmentke; West Germany	Charles Peart; Canada
L4	1984	John Fisher; Great Britain	Only one competitor	
L6	1984	Jouko Grip; Finland	Reino Peltonen; Finland	Peter Williams; Great Britain
TS2	1992	Joseph LeMar; United States	Neil Fuller; Australia	Stuart Braye; Great Britain
TS3	1992	Pieter Badenhorst; South Africa	Jerzy Szlezak; Poland	Jeff Tiessen; Canada
TS4	1992	Patrice Gerges; France	Nigel Coultas; Great Britain	Neil Louw; South Africa
T42-46	1996	Oumar Basakoulba Kone; Ivory Coast	Geir Sverrisson; Iceland	Patrice Gerges; France
T44	2000	Neil Fuller; Australia	Marcus Ehm; Germany	Roderick Green; United States
T44	2004	Danny Andrews; United States	Neil Fuller; Australia	Ryan Fann; United States
T44	2008	Oscar Pistorius; South Africa	Jim Bob Bizzell; United States	Ian Jones; Great Britain
T44	2012	Oscar Pistorius; South Africa	Blake Leeper; United States	David Prince; United States
T44	2016	Liam Malone; New Zealand	David Behre; Germany	Hunter Woodhall; United States
T46	2000	Heath Francis; Australia	Antônio Souza; Brazil	Danny Crates; Great Britain
T46	2004	Antônio Souza; Brazil	Heath Francis; Australia	Wu Faqi; China
T46	2008	Heath Francis; Australia	Antonis Aresti; Cyprus	Samuel Colmenares; Venezuela
T46	2012	Gunther Matzinger; Austria	Yohansson Nascimento; Brazil	Pradeep Uggl Dena Pathirannehelage; Sri Lanka
T47	2016	Ernesto Blanco; Cuba	Petrucio Ferreira dos Santos; Brazil	Gunther Matzinger; Austria
T47	2020	Ayoub Sadni; Morocco	Thomaz Ruan de Moraes; Brazil	Petrúcio Ferreira; Brazil
T62	2020	Johannes Floors; Germany	Olivier Hendriks; Netherlands	Hunter Woodhall; United States
T62	2024			

=== Blind athletes ===
Class	Year	Gold	Silver	Bronze
B	1980	Jerzy Landos; Poland	Jozef Pokrywka; Poland	Freddy Matton; Belgium
B1	1984	Winford Haynes; United States	Lonzey Jenkins; United States	Graham Salmon; Great Britain
B1	1988	Victor Riabochtan; Soviet Union	Cesar Antonio Gualberto; Brazil	Clavno Costa; Italy
B1	1992	Carlos Conceição; Portugal	Oscar Pupo; Cuba	Darren Collins; Australia
B2	1984	Walter Knors; West Germany	Mats Lindblad; Sweden; Ramon Odzakovic; Yugoslavia	No bronze medalist
B2	1988	Kurt Prall; Austria	Elmo Riberio; Brazil	Anatoly Pomykalov; Soviet Union
B2	1992	Omar Turro; Cuba	Jose Antonio Sanchez; Spain	Ingo Geffers; Germany
B3	1984	Lucien Quemond; France	Noel Thatcher; Great Britain	Paul Smith; United States
B3	1988	Simon Butler; Great Britain	Brian Pegram; United States	Jason Walsh; Australia
B3	1992	Oleg Chepel; Unified Team	Brian Pegram; United States	Christophe Carayon; France
T10	1996	Domingos Ramiao Game; Portugal	Jose Luis Tovar; Spain	Carlos Lopes; Portugal
T11	1996	Omar Moya; Cuba	Sergio Sanchez; Spain	Ingo Geffers; Germany
T11	2000	Carlos Lopes; Portugal	Luis Bullido; Spain	Aladji Ba; France
T11	2004	Jose Armando Sayovo; Angola	Luis Bullido; Spain	Aladji Ba; France
T11	2008	Lucas Prado; Brazil	Jose Armando Sayovo; Angola	Oleksandr Ivaniukhin; Ukraine
T11	2012	Jose Armando Sayovo; Angola	Lucas Prado; Brazil	Gauthier Mukanda; France
T11	2016	Gerard Descarrega Puigdevall; Spain; Guide: Marcos Blanquino Exposito	Felipe Gomes; Brazil; Guide: Jonas Silva	Ananias Shikongo; Namibia; Guide: Sem Shimanda
T11	2020	Gerard Descarrega Puigdevall; Spain; Guide: Guillermo Rojo Gil	Ananias Shikongo; Namibia; Guide: Sem Shimanda	Gautier Makunda; France; Guide: Lucas Mathonat
T11	2024	Enderson Santos; Venezuela	Timothée Adolphe; France	Atangana Guillaume Junior; Refugee Paralympic Team
T12	1996	Ambrosio Zaldivar; Cuba	Youcef Boudjeltia; Algeria	Aldo Manganaro; Italy
T12	2000	Li Qiang; China	Daniel Wozniak; Poland	Oleg Chepel; Belarus
T12	2004	Adekundo Adesoji; Nigeria	Li Yansong; China	Aliaksandr Kuzmichou; Belarus
T12	2008	Matthias Schroeder; Germany	Luis Goncalves; Portugal	Reza Osmanov; Azerbaijan
T12	2012	Mahmoud Khaldi; Tunisia	Hilton Langenhoven; South Africa	Jorge Gonzalez Sauceda; Mexico
T12	2016	Sun Qichao; China	Mahdi Afri; Morocco	Luis Goncalves; Portugal
T12	2020	Abdeslam Hili; Morocco	Noah Malone; United States	Rouay Jebabli; Tunisia
T12	2024			
T13	2000	Royal Mitchell; United States	Riaan Liebenberg; South Africa	José Alves; Portugal
T13	2004	Royal Mitchell; United States	Conal McNamara; Ireland	José Alves; Portugal
T13	2008	Luis Manuel Galano; Cuba	Freddy Durruthy; Cuba	Ioannis Protos; Greece
T13	2012	Aleksei Labzin; Russia	Alexander Zverev; Russia	Mohamed Amguoun; Morocco
T13	2016	Mohamed Amguoun; Morocco	Johannes Nambala; Namibia	Mohamed Fouad Hamoumou; Algeria
T13	2020	Skander Djamil Athmani; Algeria	Mohamed Amguoun; Morocco	Johannes Nambala; Namibia
T13	2024			

=== Wheelchair athletes ===
Class	Year	Gold	Silver	Bronze
1A	1984	Rainer Küschall; Switzerland	J. Lewellyn; United States	Heinrich Koeberle; West Germany
1A	1988	Gunther Obert; West Germany	Hans Lubbering; West Germany	Heinrich Koeberle; West Germany
1B	1984	J. Matsson; Sweden	N. Jorgensen; United States	Peter Schmid; Switzerland
1B	1988	Clayton Gerein; Canada	Daryl Stubel; Canada	Jan-Owe Mattsson; Sweden
1C	1984	Alan Dufty; Australia	D. Goodman; United States	Eduardo Monsalvo; Mexico
1C	1988	Jeff Worthington; United States	Andre Beaudoin; Canada	Darrell Ray; United States
2	1976	Eusebio Valdez; Mexico	Carlo Jannucci; Italy	Giusepie Trieste; Italy
2	1980	Eusebio Valdez; Mexico	Gary Kerr; United States	Shafy Meraweh; Kuwait
2	1984	Mike Nugent; Australia	Paul Clark; Canada	Heinz Frei; Switzerland
2	1988	Errol Marklein; West Germany	Richard Espinosa; United States	Chris Hallam; Great Britain
3	1976	Charles Williams; United States	Sergio Zepeda; Mexico	Jim Hernandez; United States
3	1980	Marc de Vos; Belgium	Mike Nugent; Australia	Fred Pointer; Australia
3	1984	Paul van Winkel; Belgium	Marc de Vos; Belgium	Gregor Golombek; West Germany
3	1988	Paul van Winkel; Belgium	Robert Figl; West Germany	Lars Lofstrom; Sweden
4	1984	Ron Minor; Canada	Randy Snow; United States	Remi van Ophem; Belgium
4	1988	Farid Amarouche; France	Roelof Keen; Netherlands	Jan Kleinheerenbrink; Netherlands
5	1984	Franz Nietlispach; Switzerland	D. Barret; United States	Tom Foran; United States
5-6	1988	Franz Nietlispach; Switzerland	John Anderson; United States	Lee Bong Ho; South Korea
A	1980	Patrick York; Canada	Klaus Meyer; West Germany	J. W. Visser; Netherlands
A1-3	1984	Kris Lenzo; United States	Gerry O'Rourke; Ireland	Jim Martinson; United States
A1-3/A9/L2	1988	Hakan Ericsson; Sweden	Daniel Wesley; Canada	Ted Vince; Canada
A4/A9	1988	Dennis Oehler; United States	Adrian Lowe; Australia	Andrew O'Sullivan; Australia
C2	1988	David Osborn; United States	Mogens Justesen; Denmark	Darrin Jordan; Ireland
C3	1988	Jamie Bone; Canada	Rene Rivera; United States	David Severin; Canada
C3-4	1992	David Larson; United States	Ross Davis; United States	Christopher Ridgway; United States
C4	1984	Robert Easton; Canada	Jean Louis Janneay; France	Antoine Delaune; France
C4-5	1988	Robert Easton; Canada	Gino Vendetti; Canada	David Larson; United States
D1 (wheelchairs)	1984	Curt Brinkman; United States	Jim Martinson; United States	J. Finch; United States
L2	1984	Patrick de Uylder; Belgium	Scott Schneider; United States	Gary Stone; United States
L3	1984	Hikan Eriksson; Sweden	Bill Lehr; United States	John Grant; Great Britain
TW1	1992	Bart Dodson; United States	Hans Lubbering; Germany	Rainer Küschall; Switzerland
TW2	1992	Richard Reelie; Canada	Theo Duyvestijn; Netherlands	Bradley Ramage; United States
TW3	1992	Markus Pilz; Germany	Marc Quessy; Canada	John Lindsay; Australia
TW4	1992	Michael Noe; United States	Claude Issorat; France	Hakan Ericsson; Sweden
T32-33	1996	David Larson; United States	Gunnar Krantz; Sweden	Ross Davis; United States
T34	2000	Kazuya Maeba; Japan	Jason Lachance; Canada	Ross Davis; United States
T50	1996	Alvise de Vidi; Italy	Tim Johansson; Sweden	Giuseppe Forni; Switzerland
T51	1996	Shawn Meredith; United States	Dean Bergeron; Canada	Andre Beaudoin; Canada
T51	2000	Fabian Blattman; Australia	Alvise De Vidi; Italy	Bart Dodson; United States
T51	2016	Peter Genyn; Belgium	Edgar Cesareo Navarro Sanchez; Mexico	Alvise de Vidi; Italy
T52	1996	Winfried Sigg; Germany	Markus Pilz; Germany	John Lindsay; Australia
T52	2000	Salvador Hernandez; Mexico	Naseib Obaid Sebait Araidat; United Arab Emirates	Dean Bergeron; Canada
T52	2004	Toshihiro Takada; Japan	Andre Beaudoin; Canada	Thomas Geierspichler; Switzerland
T52	2008	Tomoya Ito; Japan	Toshihiro Takada; Japan	Dean Bergeron; Canada
T52	2012	Raymond Martin; United States	Tomoya Ito; Japan	Thomas Geierspichler; Austria
T52	2016	Raymond Martin; United States	Tomoki Sato; Japan	Gianfranco Iannotta; United States
T52	2020	Tomoki Sato; Japan	Raymond Martin; United States	Hirokazu Ueyonabaru; Japan
T52	2024	Maxime Carabin; Belgium	Tomoki Sato; Japan	Tomoya Ito; Japan
T53	1996	Claude Issorat; France	Jeff Adams; Canada	Jeferey Muralt; New Zealand
T53	2000	Moon Jung-hoon; South Korea	Pierre Fairbank; France	Charles Tolle; France
T53	2004	Hamad Aladwani; Kuwait	Hong Suk Man; South Korea	Joshua George; United States
T53	2008	Hong Suk Man; South Korea	Li Huzhao; China	Richard Colman; Australia
T53	2012	Li Huzhao; China	Brent Lakatos; Canada	Richard Colman; Australia
T53	2016	Pongsakorn Paeyo; Thailand	Brent Lakatos; Canada	Pierre Fairbank; France
T53	2020	Pongsakorn Paeyo; Thailand	Brent Lakatos; Canada	Vitalii Gritsenko; RPC
T53	2024	Pongsakorn Paeyo; Thailand	Brent Lakatos; Canada	Brian Siemann; United States
T54	2000	Claude Issorat; France	Jeff Adams; Canada	Ernst van Dyk; South Africa
T54	2004	Kenny van Weeghel; Netherlands	Choke Yasuoka; Japan	Jeff Adams; Canada
T54	2008	Zhang Lixin; China	David Weir; Great Britain	Saichon Konjen; Thailand
T54	2012	Zhang Lixin; China	Kenny van Weeghel; Netherlands	Liu Chengming; China
T54	2016	Kenny van Weeghel; Netherlands	Liu Yang; China	Yassine Gharbi; Tunisia
T54	2020	Daniel Romanchuk; United States	Athiwat Paeng-Nuea; Thailand	Dai Yunqiang; China
T54	2024	Dai Yunqiang; China	Athiwat Paeng-nuea; Thailand	Daniel Romanchuk; United States

== Women's medal summaries ==
=== Ambulant athletes ===
Class	Year	Gold	Silver	Bronze
CP C	1980	Onfroy; France	Veronique Rochette; France	Linda Feeny; United States
CP D	1980	D. Dosimont; France	Royet; France	Joanne Guardiola; United States
C4	1984	Merja Jaaroa; Sweden	Kimala Searcy; United States	Cathy Brown; United States
C7	1984	Anette Saeger; West Germany	Veronique Rochette; France	Susanna Schmid; West Germany
C7	1988	Siw Kristin Vestengen; Norway	Maria Albertina Cabral; Portugal	Sonja Atkins; Canada
C7-8	1992	Esther Cruice; Great Britain	Maki Okada; Japan	Alma Rock; Ireland
C8	1984	Brenda Woodcock; Great Britain	Henrike Noller; West Germany	Toshiko Kobayashi; Japan
C8	1988	Maki Okada; Japan	Sylvie Bergeron; Canada	Annette Saeger; West Germany
T20	2016	Breanna Clark; United States	Natalia Iezlovetska; Ukraine	Barbara Niewiedzial; Poland
T20	2020	Breanna Clark; United States	Yuliia Shuliar; Ukraine	Jardênia Félix; Brazil
T36	2000	Caroline Innes; Great Britain	Eleni Samaritaki; Greece	Yu Chun Lai; Hong Kong
T37	2012	Neda Bahi; Tunisia	Viktoriya Kravchenko; Ukraine	Evgeniya Trushnikova; Russia
T37	2016	Georgina Hermitage; Great Britain	Wen Xiaoyan; China	Neda Bahi; Tunisia
T37	2020	Jiang Fenfen; China	Nataliia Kobzar; Ukraine	Sheryl James; South Africa
T38	2000	Lisa McIntosh; Australia	Katrina Webb; Australia	Maria Fernandes; Portugal
T38	2004	Katrina Webb; Australia	Wang Fang; China	Inna Dyachenko; Ukraine
T38	2016	Kadeena Cox; Great Britain	Chen Junfei; China	Veronica Hipolito; Brazil
T38	2020	Lindy Ave; Germany	Margarita Goncharova; RPC	Darian Faisury Jiménez; Colombia

=== Amputee athletes ===
Class	Year	Gold	Silver	Bronze
A1-3/A9/L2	1988	Valerie Deconde; France	Linda Hamilton; Canada	Baek Min Ae; South Korea
A6/A8/A9/L4	1988	Petra Buddelmeyer; West Germany	Tanja Tervonen; Finland	Jessica Sachse; West Germany
A4	1984	Reinheld Moller; West Germany	Karen Farmer; United States	Anne Farrell; Canada
D	1980	R. Kirby; United States	Only one competitor	
D1 (runners)	1980	Alina Wieczorek; Poland	Only one competitor	
E	1980	Barbara Joscelyne; Great Britain	R. Rantala; Finland	No bronze medalist
F1	1980	Giselle Cole; Canada	U. Sievert; West Germany	Petra Schad; West Germany
T44	2016	Marie-Amelie Le Fur; France	Irmgard Bensusan; Germany	Grace Norman; United States
T46	2000	Lioubov Vassilieva; Russia	Anna Szymul; Poland	Amy Winters; Australia
T46	2004	Tshotlego Morama; Botswana	Anna Szymul; Poland	Alicja Fiodorow; Poland
T46	2012	Yunidis Castillo; Cuba	Anrune Liebenberg; South Africa	Alicja Fiodorow; Poland
T47	2016	Li Lu; China	Anrune Liebenberg; South Africa	Sae Tsuji; Japan
T47	2020	Anrune Weyers; South Africa	Lisbeli Vera Andrade; Venezuela	Anastasiia Soloveva; RPC

=== Blind athletes ===
Class	Year	Gold	Silver	Bronze
A	1980	Lou Keller; United States	Purificacion Santamarta; Spain	Eva Johansson; Sweden
B	1980	I. Schafhausen; West Germany	Brenda Wells; United States	Donna Webb; United States
B1	1984	Purificacion Santamarta; Spain	Refija Okic; Yugoslavia	Rossella Inverni; Italy
B1	1988	Tamara Pankova; Soviet Union	Purificacion Santamarta; Spain	Rossella Inverni; Italy
B1	1992	Purificacion Santamarta; Spain	Tracey Hinton; Great Britain	Sigita Kriaučiūnienė; Lithuania
B2	1984	Carol Carr; Ireland	Malgorzata Zalenska; Poland	Emanuela Grigio; Italy
B2	1988	Rima Batalova; Soviet Union	Adria Santos; Brazil	Anelise Hermany; Brazil
B2	1992	Rima Batalova; Unified Team	Claudia Meier; Germany	Marsha Green; Australia
B3	1984	Beth Bishop; United States	Halina Wozniak; Poland	Zhao Jihong; China
B3	1988	Zhao Jihong; China	Helena Leja; Poland	Danute Chmidek; Soviet Union
B3	1992	Marla Runyan; United States	Sharon Bolton; Great Britain	Olga Churkina; Unified Team
T10	1996	Purificacion Santamarta; Spain	Adria Santos; Brazil	Maria Ligorio; Italy
T11	1996	Rima Batalova; Russia	Maria Ortega; Spain	Elena Jdanova; Russia
T11	2000	Purificacion Santamarta; Spain	Adria Santos; Brazil	Tracey Hinton; Great Britain
T11	2016	Liu Cuiqing; China; Guide: Xu Donglin	Sol Rojas; Venezuela; Guide: Edicson Medina	Terezinha Guilhermina; Brazil; Guide: Rodrigo Chieregatto Arcanjo
T11	2020	Liu Cuiqing; China; Guide: Xu Donglin	Thalita Simplicio; Brazil; Guide: Felipe Veloso	Angie Pabón; Colombia; Guide: Luis Arizala
T12	2004	Assia El Hannouni; France	Adria Santos; Brazil	Terezinha Guilhermina; Brazil
T12	2008	Assia El Hannouni; France	Oxana Boturchuk; Ukraine	Terezinha Guilhermina; Brazil
T12	2012	Assia El Hannouni; France	Oxana Boturchuk; Ukraine	Daniela Velasco Maldonado; Mexico
T12	2016	Omara Durand; Cuba; Guide: Yuniol Kindelan	Oxana Boturchuk; Ukraine; Guide: Volodymyr Burakov	Edmilsa Governo; Mozambique; Guide: Filipe Joao Chaimite
T12	2020	Omara Durand; Cuba; Guide: Yuniol Kindelan	Oxana Boturchuk; Ukraine; Guide: Mykyta Barabanov	Alejandra Paola Pérez López; Venezuela; Guide: Markinzon Manzanilla
T13	2004	Olga Semenova; Russia	Anthi Karagianni; Greece	Ilse Hayes; South Africa
T13	2008	Sanaa Benhama; Morocco	Alexandra Dimoglou; Greece	Nantenin Keita; France
T13	2012	Omara Durand; Cuba	Somaya Bousaid; Tunisia	Alexandra Dimoglou; Greece
T13	2016	Nantenin Keita; France	Ilse Hayes; South Africa	Leilia Adzhametova; Ukraine
T13	2020	Lamiya Valiyeva; Azerbaijan	Adiaratou Iglesias Forneiro; Spain	Kym Crosby; United States

=== Wheelchair athletes ===
Class	Year	Gold	Silver	Bronze
1A	1984	Martha Gustafson; Canada	M. Ferraz; Brazil	K. Holm; United States
1B	1984	J. Mora; United States	P. Delevacque; France	No bronze medalist
1C	1984	Tham Simpson; Canada	J. Gutierrez; Mexico	Judy Zelman; Canada
1C	1988	Leticia Torres; Mexico	Yolande Hansen; West Germany	Jean Waters; United States
2	1976	Elisabeth Bisquolm; Switzerland	Concepcion Salguero; Mexico	Glee Lyford; United States
2	1980	Glee Lyford; United States	Elisabeth Bisquolm; Switzerland	Patricia Hill; New Zealand
2	1984	Ingrid Lauridsen; Denmark	B. Moore; United States	Glee Lyford; United States
2	1988	Ingrid Lauridsen; Denmark	Yvette McLellan; Australia	Ann Walters; United States
3	1976	Ellyn Boyd; United States	Karen Casper; United States	Emilie Schwarz; Austria
3	1980	Candace Cable; United States	Angeles Valdez; Mexico	Pam Frazee; Canada
3	1984	Debbi Kostelyk; Canada	Gabriele Beyer (Paralympian); West Germany	M. D. L. A. Valdes; Mexico
3	1988	Patricia Durkin; United States	Daniela Jutzeler; Switzerland	Tanni Grey; Great Britain
4	1984	Monica Saker; Sweden	Chris de Craene; Belgium	Connie Hansen; Denmark
4	1988	Connie Hansen; Denmark	Cecilia Vazquez; Mexico	Maria Hill; United States
5	1984	A. Orvefors; Sweden	Angela Lereti; Canada	Martine Prieur; France
5-6	1988	Juana Soto; Mexico	Deahnne McIntyre; Australia	Jean Driscoll; United States
C1	1980	Danuta Kozlak; Poland	Only one competitor	
D1 (wheelchairs)	1980	Barbara Bedla; Poland	Only one competitor	
L2	1984	Wilma Lawrie; Great Britain	Terri Dixon; United States	No bronze medalist
TW2	1992	Kristine Harder; Canada	Jean Waters; United States	Leticia Torres; Mexico
TW3	1992	Tanni Grey; Great Britain	Ingrid Lauridsen; Denmark	Francesca Porcellato; Italy
TW4	1992	Louise Sauvage; Australia	Connie Hansen; Denmark	Monica Wetterstrom; Sweden
T34	2000	Rebecca Feldman; Australia	Mary Rice; Ireland	Caitlin Renneson; Canada
T34	2016	Hannah Cockroft; Great Britain	Alexa Halko; United States	Kare Adenegan; Great Britain
T51	1996	Ursina Greuter; Switzerland	Jean Waters; United States	Leticia Torres; Mexico
T52	1996	Leann Shannon; United States	Tanni Grey; Great Britain	Joelle Vogel; France
T52	2000	Lisa Franks; Canada	Ursina Greuter; Switzerland	Miki Yoda; Japan
T52	2004	Lisa Franks; Canada	Lucía Sosa; Mexico	Leticia Torres; Mexico
T52	2016	Michelle Stilwell; Canada	Marieke Vervoort; Belgium	Kerri Morgan; United States
T53	1996	Louise Sauvage; Australia	Chantal Petitclerc; Canada	Cheri Becerra; United States
T53	2000	Tanni Grey-Thompson; Great Britain	Madelene Nordlund; Sweden	Cheri Blauwet; United States
T53	2004	Tanni Grey-Thompson; Great Britain	Madelene Nordlund; Sweden	Francesca Porcellato; Italy
T53	2008	Jessica Galli; United States	Zhou Hongzhuan; China	Anjali Forber Pratt; United States
T53	2012	Zhou Hongzhuan; China	Angela Ballard; Australia	Huang Lisha; China
T53	2016	Zhou Hongzhuan; China	Chelsea McClammer; United States	Angela Ballard; Australia
T53	2020	Catherine Debrunner; Switzerland	Samantha Kinghorn; Great Britain	Zhou Hongzhuan; China
T54	2000	Cheri Becerra; United States	Chantal Petitclerc; Canada	Sofia Dettmann; Sweden
T54	2004	Chantal Petitclerc; Canada	Louise Sauvage; Australia	Diane Roy; Canada
T54	2008	Chantal Petitclerc; Canada	Tatyana McFadden; United States	Diane Roy; Canada
T54	2012	Tatyana McFadden; United States	Dong Hongjiao; China	Edith Wolf; Switzerland
T54	2016	Tatyana McFadden; United States	Cheri Madsen; United States	Zou Lihong; China
T54	2020	Manuela Schar; Switzerland	Cheri Madsen; United States	Zhou Zhaoqian; China

== See also ==
- Athletics at the Olympics
- 400 metres at the Olympics
