= Athletics at the 2004 Summer Paralympics – Men's 100 metres T11–13 =

Men's 100m races for blind & visually impaired athletes at the 2004 Summer Paralympics were held in the Athens Olympic Stadium. Events were held in three disability classes.

== T11 ==
Men's 100m T11 at the XII Paralympic Games
- Venue: Athens Olympic Stadium
- Dates: 21–22 September 2004
- Competitors: 21 from 16 nations
- Winning time: 11.41

Medalists
1st place, gold medalist(s)		José Armando Sayovo	Angola
2nd place, silver medalist(s)		Gautier Makunda	France
3rd place, bronze medalist(s)		Luís Bullido	Spain

The T11 event consisted of 6 heats, 3 semifinals and A & B finals. It was won by José Armando Sayovo, representing Angola.

=== 1st Round ===
Qualified for next round

Heat 1

21 Sept. 2004, 10:35

Rank	Athlete	Time	Notes
1	Wu Xiang (CHN)	11.99	Q
2	Xavier Porras (ESP)	12.20	
3	Alessio Carosi (ITA)	12.27	

Heat 2

21 Sept. 2004, 10:41

Rank	Athlete	Time	Notes
1	Hichem Fellahi (ALG)	11.80	Q
2	Oleksandr Ivanyukhin (UKR)	11.82	q
	Zeynidin Bilalov (AZE)		

Heat 3

21 Sept. 2004, 10:47

Rank	Athlete	Time	Notes
1	Gautier Makunda (FRA)	11.60	Q
2	Adrian Iznaga (CUB)	11.61	q
3	Hilário Moreira (BRA)	11.93	q

Heat 4

21 Sept. 2004, 10:53

Rank	Athlete	Time	Notes
1	Luís Bullido (ESP)	11.81	Q
2	Carlos Lopes (POR)	11.87	q
3	Bil Marinkovic (AUT)	12.24	
	Lorenzo Ricci (ITA)	DNF	

Heat 5

21 Sept. 2004, 10:59

Rank	Athlete	Time	Notes
1	Chijoke Kingsley (NGR)	11.86	Q
2	Shigeki Yano (JPN)	11.95	q
3	Ângeloo Londaca (ANG)	12.04	
4	Athanasios Barakas (GRE)	12.56	

Heat 6

21 Sept. 2004, 11:05

Rank	Athlete	Time	Notes
1	José Armando Sayovo (ANG)	11.37	WR Q
2	Firmino Baptista (POR)	11.96	q
3	Koji Saito (JPN)	12.09	
4	Sanguan Chanamal (THA)	12.49	

=== Semifinals ===
Heat 1

21 Sept. 2004, 20:25

Rank	Athlete	Time	Notes
1	Jose Armando Sayovo (ANG)	11.41	Q
2	Adrian Iznaga (CUB)	11.93	
3	Wu Xiang (CHN)	11.94	
4	Firmino Baptista (POR)	12.09	

Heat 2

21 Sept. 2004, 20:31

Rank	Athlete	Time	Notes
1	Gautier Makunda (FRA)	11.75	Q
2	Oleksandr Ivanyukhin (UKR)	11.80	q
3	Chijoke O. Kingsley (NGR)	11.80	
4	Shigeki Yano (JPN)	11.86	

Heat 3

21 Sept. 2004, 20:37

Rank	Athlete	Time	Notes
1	Luís Bullido (ESP)	11.77	Q
2	Hichem Fellahi (ALG)	11.81	
3	Carlos Lopes (POR)	11.85	
4	Hilario Moreira (BRA)	12.04	

=== Final Round ===
Final A

22 Sept. 2004, 17:40

Rank	Athlete	Time	Notes
1st place, gold medalist(s)	Jose Armando Sayovo (ANG)	11.41	
2nd place, silver medalist(s)	Gautier Makunda (FRA)	11.71	
3rd place, bronze medalist(s)	Luís Bullido (ESP)	11.75	
4	Oleksandr Ivanyukhin (UKR)	11.76	

Final B

22 Sept. 2004, 17:30

Rank	Athlete	Time	Notes
1	Chijoke O. Kingsley (NGR)	11.80	
2	Hichem Fellahi (ALG)	11.85	
3	Carlos Lopes (POR)	11.92	
4	Shigeki Yano (JPN)	11.93	

== T12 ==
Men's 100m T12 at the XII Paralympic Games
- Venue: Athens Olympic Stadium
- Dates: 21–22 September 2004
- Competitors: 30 from 25 nations
- Winning time: 10.75

Medalists
1st place, gold medalist(s)		Adekundo Adesoji	Nigeria
2nd place, silver medalist(s)		Ricardo Santana	Venezuela
3rd place, bronze medalist(s)		Matthias Schroeder	Germany

The T12 event consisted of 8 heats, 3 semifinals and A & B finals. It was won by Adekundo Adesoji, representing Nigeria.

=== 1st Round ===
Qualified for next round

Heat 1

21 Sept. 2004, 11:15

Rank	Athlete	Time	Notes
1	Adekundo Adesoji (NGR)	10.77	PR Q
2	Odúver Daza (VEN)	11.50	
3	Abdulhadi Al Yousef (KSA)	11.55	
	Oleg Panyutin (AZE)	DNF	

Heat 2

21 Sept. 2004, 11:21

Rank	Athlete	Time	Notes
1	Ricardo Santana (VEN)	10.98	Q
2	Chararn Kajornvech (THA)	11.52	
3	Juan Antonio Nogales (ESP)	11.67	

Heat 3

21 Sept. 2004, 11:27

Rank	Athlete	Time	Notes
1	José Villarreal (VEN)	11.28	Q
2	Ahmed Belhaj Ali (TUN)	11.55	
	Redouane Merah (ALG)	DNF	

Heat 4

21 Sept. 2004, 11:33

Rank	Athlete	Time	Notes
1	Duan Qifeng (CHN)	11.35	Q
2	Nelacey Porter (USA)	11.41	q
3	Aliaksandr Batsian (BLR)	11.71	
4	Sello Mothebe (LES)	12.51	

Heat 5

21 Sept. 2004, 11:39

Rank	Athlete	Time	Notes
1	Li Qiang (CHN)	11.21	Q
2	Hilton Langenhoven (RSA)	11.33	q
3	Andrey Koptev (RUS)	11.45	
4	Zoubeirou Issaka (NIG)	13.90	

Heat 6

21 Sept. 2004, 11:45

Rank	Athlete	Time	Notes
1	Francisco Jose Sanchez (ESP)	11.28	Q
2	Daniel Wozniak (POL)	11.40	q
3	Matteo Tassetti (ITA)	11.91	
4	Loukmane Nassirou (BEN)	13.30	

Heat 7

21 Sept. 2004, 11:51

Rank	Athlete	Time	Notes
1	Li Yansong (CHN)	11.32	Q
2	Ioannis Stavridis (GRE)	11.40	q
3	Igor Pashchenko (UKR)	11.73	
4	Mohd Hisham Khaironi (MAS)	11.84	

Heat 8

21 Sept. 2004, 11:57

Rank	Athlete	Time	Notes
1	Matthias Schroeder (GER)	11.15	Q
2	Goran Zezelj (CRO)	11.57	
3	Julio Souza (BRA)	11.79	
4	Richard Souci (MRI)	12.51	

=== Semifinals ===
Heat 1

21 Sept. 2004, 19:40

Rank	Athlete	Time	Notes
1	Adekundo Adesoji (NGR)	10.78	Q
2	Nelacey Porter (USA)	11.06	q
3	Li Yansong (CHN)	11.24	
4	José Villarreal (VEN)	11.36	

Heat 2

21 Sept. 2004, 19:46

Rank	Athlete	Time	Notes
1	Ricardo Santana (VEN)	11.04	Q
2	Ioannis Stavridis (GRE)	11.32	
3	Francisco Jose Sanchez (ESP)	11.37	
	Duan Qifeng (CHN)	DNS	

Heat 3

21 Sept. 2004, 19:52

Rank	Athlete	Time	Notes
1	Matthias Schroeder (GER)	10.91	Q
2	Li Qiang (CHN)	11.25	
3	Hilton Langenhoven (RSA)	11.28	
4	Daniel Wozniak (POL)	15.80	

=== Final Round ===
Final A

22 Sept. 2004, 17:20

Rank	Athlete	Time	Notes
1st place, gold medalist(s)	Adekundo Adesoji (NGR)	10.75	WR
2nd place, silver medalist(s)	Ricardo Santana (VEN)	10.96	
3rd place, bronze medalist(s)	Matthias Schroeder (GER)	11.00	
4	Nelacey Porter (USA)	11.05	

Final B

22 Sept. 2004, 17:10

Rank	Athlete	Time	Notes
1	Li Yansong (CHN)	11.27	
2	Ioannis Stavridis (GRE)	11.27	
3	Li Qiang (CHN)	11.31	
4	Hilton Langenhoven (RSA)	11.40	

== T13 ==
Men's 100m T13 at the XII Paralympic Games
- Venue: Athens Olympic Stadium
- Dates: 26–27 September 2004
- Competitors: 14 from 13 nations
- Winning time: 10.98

Medalists
1st place, gold medalist(s)		Royal Mitchell	United States
2nd place, silver medalist(s)		Andre Andrade	Brazil
3rd place, bronze medalist(s)		Irving Bustamante	Cuba

The T13 event consisted of 2 heats and a final. It was won by Royal Mitchell, representing United States.

=== 1st Round ===
Qualified for next round

Heat 1

26 Sept. 2004, 22:10

Rank	Athlete	Time	Notes
1	Andre Andrade (BRA)	11.06	Q
2	Nathan Meyer (RSA)	11.22	Q
3	Ihar Fartunau (BLR)	11.42	Q
4	Yuriy Gornak (AZE)	11.59	
5	Ronan Pallier (FRA)	11.63	
6	Xu Xiaocheng (CHN)	11.66	
7	Omar Al Rashidi (KSA)	11.73	

Heat 2

26 Sept. 2004, 22:16

Rank	Athlete	Time	Notes
1	Royal Mitchell (USA)	11.05	Q
2	Irving Bustamante (CUB)	11.14	Q
3	Kordian Galinski (POL)	11.26	Q
4	Ioannis Protos (GRE)	11.31	q
5	Aldo Manganaro (ITA)	11.32	q
6	Jonathan Ntutu (RSA)	11.34	
7	Shahzad Muhammad (PAK)	12.77	

=== Final Round ===
27 Sept. 2004, 17:05

Rank	Athlete	Time	Notes
1st place, gold medalist(s)	Royal Mitchell (USA)	10.98	PR
2nd place, silver medalist(s)	Andre Andrade (BRA)	11.06	
3rd place, bronze medalist(s)	Irving Bustamante (CUB)	11.24	
4	Kordian Galinski (POL)	11.30	
5	Nathan Meyer (RSA)	11.34	
6	Ioannis Protos (GRE)	11.35	
7	Aldo Manganaro (ITA)	11.39	
	Ihar Fartunau (BLR)	DNS	
