= Athletics at the 2004 Summer Paralympics – Men's 400 metres T11–13 =

Men's 400m races for blind & visually impaired athletes at the 2004 Summer Paralympics were held in the Athens Olympic Stadium between 23 & 27 September. Events were held in three disability classes.

== T11 ==
Men's 400m T11 at the XII Paralympic Games
- Venue: Athens Olympic Stadium
- Dates: 25–27 September 2004
- Competitors: 11 from 9 nations
- Winning time: 51.10

Medalists
1st place, gold medalist(s)		Jose Armando Sayovo	Angola
2nd place, silver medalist(s)		Luís Bullido	Spain
3rd place, bronze medalist(s)		Aladji Ba	France

The T11 event consisted of 3 heats, 2 semifinals and A & B finals. It was won by Jose Armando Sayovo, representing Angola.

=== 1st Round ===
Qualified for next round

Heat 1

25 Sept. 2004, 12:25

Rank	Athlete	Time	Notes
1	Aladji Ba (FRA)	52.62	Q
2	Paul Harpur (AUS)	54.31	Q
3	Chijoke O. Kingsley (NGR)	54.33	

Heat 2

25 Sept. 2004, 12:32

Rank	Athlete	Time	Notes
1	Luís Bullido (ESP)	54.00	Q
2	Hilario Moreira (BRA)	54.74	Q
3	Lukas Hendry (SUI)	56.36	
4	Angelo Londaca (ANG)	57.63	

Heat 3

25 Sept. 2004, 12:39

Rank	Athlete	Time	Notes
1	Jose Armando Sayovo (ANG)	50.03	WR Q
2	Dustin Walsh (CAN)	53.81	Q
3	Pedro Delgado (ESP)	54.02	q
4	Oleksandr Ivanyukhin (UKR)	54.28	q

=== Semifinals ===
Heat 1

26 Sept. 2004, 18:20

Rank	Athlete	Time	Notes
1	Jose Armando Sayovo (ANG)	51.40	Q
2	Pedro Delgado (ESP)	55.35	
3	Dustin Walsh (CAN)	55.53	
4	Paul Harpur (AUS)	55.74	

Heat 2

26 Sept. 2004, 18:27

Rank	Athlete	Time	Notes
1	Luís Bullido (ESP)	52.87	Q
2	Aladji Ba (FRA)	52.97	q
3	Oleksandr Ivanyukhin (UKR)	54.19	q
	Hilario Moreira (BRA)	DNS	

=== Final Round ===
Final A

27 Sept. 2004, 17:25

Rank	Athlete	Time	Notes
1st place, gold medalist(s)	Jose Armando Sayovo (ANG)	51.10	
2nd place, silver medalist(s)	Luís Bullido (ESP)	52.10	
3rd place, bronze medalist(s)	Aladji Ba (FRA)	52.46	
4	Oleksandr Ivanyukhin (UKR)	52.85	

Final B

27 Sept. 2004, 17:20

Rank	Athlete	Time	Notes
1	Dustin Walsh (CAN)	54.52	
2	Pedro Delgado (ESP)	54.54	
3	Paul Harpur (AUS)	54.60	

== T12 ==
Men's 400m T12 at the XII Paralympic Games
- Venue: Athens Olympic Stadium
- Dates: 23–25 September 2004
- Competitors: 16 from 14 nations
- Winning time: 48.93

Medalists
1st place, gold medalist(s)		Adekundo Adesoji	Nigeria
2nd place, silver medalist(s)		Li Yansong	China
3rd place, bronze medalist(s)		Aliaksandr Kuzmichou	Belarus

The T12 event consisted of 4 heats, 2 semifinals and A & B finals. It was won by Adekundo Adesoji, representing Nigeria.

=== 1st Round ===
Qualified for next round

Heat 1

23 Sept. 2004, 09:35

Rank	Athlete	Time	Notes
1	Daniel Wozniak (POL)	51.71	Q
2	Thomas Ulbricht (GER)	52.57	q
3	José Villarreal (VEN)	52.81	q
4	Ignacio Avila (ESP)	53.97	

Heat 2

23 Sept. 2004, 09:42

Rank	Athlete	Time	Notes
1	Omar Turro (CUB)	52.73	Q
2	Nelacey Porter (USA)	53.66	q
3	Li Qiang (CHN)	53.69	
4	Duncan Kipkemei (KEN)	54.56	

Heat 3

23 Sept. 2004, 09:49

Rank	Athlete	Time	Notes
1	Li Yansong (CHN)	50.59	Q
2	Gabriel Potra (POR)	1:09.18	
	Andrew A. Auma (KEN)	DSQ	
	Andrey Koptev (RUS)	DNS	

Heat 4

23 Sept. 2004, 09:56

Rank	Athlete	Time	Notes
1	Adekundo Adesoji (NGR)	49.56	PR Q
2	Aliaksandr Kuzmichou (BLR)	50.55	q
3	Breylin Martinez (DOM)	59.35	
4	Redouane Merah (ALG)	1:02.71	

=== Semifinals ===
Heat 1

24 Sept. 2004, 22:10

Rank	Athlete	Time	Notes
1	Adekundo Adesoji (NGR)	49.82	Q
2	Aliaksandr Kuzmichou (BLR)	50.51	q
3	Nelacey Porter (USA)	56.51	
4	Omar Turro (CUB)	57.66	

Heat 2

24 Sept. 2004, 22:17

Rank	Athlete	Time	Notes
1	Daniel Wozniak (POL)	51.58	Q
2	Li Yansong (CHN)	51.99	q
3	Thomas Ulbricht (GER)	52.68	
4	José Villarreal (VEN)	53.83	

=== Final Round ===
Final A

25 Sept. 2004, 20:00

Rank	Athlete	Time	Notes
1st place, gold medalist(s)	Adekundo Adesoji (NGR)	48.93	PR
2nd place, silver medalist(s)	Li Yansong (CHN)	49.20	
3rd place, bronze medalist(s)	Aliaksandr Kuzmichou (BLR)	49.70	
4	Daniel Wozniak (POL)	50.30	

Final B

25 Sept. 2004, 19:50

Rank	Athlete	Time	Notes
1	Thomas Ulbricht (GER)	52.36	
2	José Villarreal (VEN)	53.44	
	Omar Turro (CUB)	DNS	
	Nelacey Porter (USA)	DNS	

== T13 ==
Men's 400m T13 at the XII Paralympic Games
- Venue: Athens Olympic Stadium
- Dates: 24 September 2004
- Competitors: 7 from 7 nations
- Winning time: 49.78

Medalists
1st place, gold medalist(s)		Royal Mitchell	United States
2nd place, silver medalist(s)		Conal McNamara	Ireland
3rd place, bronze medalist(s)		José Alves	Portugal

The T13 event consisted of a single race. It was won by Royal Mitchell, representing United States.

=== Final Round ===
24 Sept. 2004, 18:10

Rank	Athlete	Time	Notes
1st place, gold medalist(s)	Royal Mitchell (USA)	49.78	
2nd place, silver medalist(s)	Conal McNamara (IRL)	50.62	
3rd place, bronze medalist(s)	José Alves (POR)	50.86	
4	Yuriy Gornak (AZE)	51.01	
5	Stuart McGregor (CAN)	51.02	
6	Cesar A. Lopez (GUA)	58.27	
7	Orlando Pineda (HON)	1:13.47	
