= Athletics at the 2004 Summer Paralympics – Men's 4 × 100 metre relay T11–T13 =

Men's 4x100m T11-13 at the XII Paralympic Games
- Venue: Athens Olympic Stadium
- Dates: 27 September 2004
- Competitors: 10
- Winning time: 43.16

Medalists
1st place, gold medalist(s)		Wu Xiang; Li Qiang; Li Yansong; Duan Qifeng	China
2nd place, silver medalist(s)		Irving Bustamante; Adrian Iznaga; Enrique Cepeda; Ángel Jiménez; Fernando Gonzalez	Cuba
3rd place, bronze medalist(s)		Anibal Bello; Odúver Daza; Ricardo Santana; José Villarreal	Venezuela

The Men's 4 × 100 m relay T11-13 for blind & visually impaired athletes at the 2004 Summer Paralympics were held in the Athens Olympic Stadium on 27 September. The event consisted of 3 heats and a final, and was won by the team representing China.

== 1st round ==
Qualified for next round

Heat 1

27 Sept. 2004, 09:30

Rank	Team	Time	Notes
1	Brazil	44.89	Q
2	Portugal	44.83	
	Greece	DNS	

Heat 2

27 Sept. 2004, 09:40

Rank	Team	Time	Notes
1	China	43.60	WR Q
2	Germany	46.57	
	Spain	DSQ	

Heat 3

27 Sept. 2004, 09:50

Rank	Team	Time	Notes
1	Venezuela	43.82	Q
2	Cuba	44.15	q
3	United States	45.18	
	France	DNS	

== Final round ==
27 Sept. 2004, 22:00

Rank	Team	Time	Notes
1st place, gold medalist(s)	China	43.16	WR
2nd place, silver medalist(s)	Cuba	44.60	
3rd place, bronze medalist(s)	Venezuela	44.78	
4	Brazil	45.08	

== Team Lists ==
China; Wu Xiang; Li Qiang; Li Yansong; Duan Qifeng	Venezuela; Anibal Bello; Odúver Daza; Ricardo Santana; José Villarreal	Cuba; Irving Bustamante; Adrian Iznaga; Enrique Cepeda; Ángel Jiménez; Fernando Gonzalez	Portugal; Gabriel Potra; Carlos Lopes; José Alves; Firmino Baptista
Brazil; Odair Santos; Julio Souza; André Andrade; Hilario Moreira	United States; Nelacey Porter; Joseph Aukward; Royal Mitchell; Elexis Gillette	Germany; Rayk Haucke; Matthias Schroeder; Joerg Trippen; Thomas Ulbricht	Spain; Juan Antonio Nogales; Luís Bullido; Francisco Jose Sanchez; Javier Martin
Greece; Ioannis Stavridis; Ioannis Protos; Loukas Kaskanis; Athanasios Barakas; Dimitrios Alexiou	France; Aladji Ba; Stéphane Bozzolo; Gautier Makunda; Ronan Pallier		
