= Athletics at the 2008 Summer Paralympics – Men's 200 metres T12 =

The Men's 200m T12 had its first round held on September 14, beginning at 9:05. The Semifinals were held on September 15, at 10:38 and the A and B Finals were held on September 16 at 9:57.

== Medalists ==
Gold	Hilton Langenhoven; South Africa
Silver	Li Yansong; China
Bronze	Yuqing Yang; China

== Results ==
Place	Athlete	Round 1	Semifinals	Final B	Final A
1	Hilton Langenhoven (RSA)	22.20 Q	22.06 Q	—	21.94
2	Li Yansong (CHN)	22.63 Q	22.47 Q	—	22.21
3	Yuqing Yang (CHN)	22.44 q	22.27 q	—	22.39
4	Josiah Jamison (USA)	22.20 Q	22.19 Q	—	DNS
5	Adekunle Adesoji (NGR)	22.35 q	22.46 q	22.48	
6	Li Qiang (CHN)	22.85 Q	22.51 q	22.64	
7	Matthias Schroder (GER)	22.91 Q	22.73 q	22.71	
8	Mateusz Michalski (POL)	22.72 q	22.60 q	22.75	
9	Gabriel Potra (POR)	22.92 q	23.23		
10	Daniel Wozniak (POL)	23.16 q	23.50		
11	Luis Goncalves (POR)	22.88 Q	22.83		
12	Ricardo Santana (VEN)	23.32 q	DNF		
13	Nemanja Savkovic (SRB)	23.37			
14	Elchin Muradov (AZE)	23.38			
15	Maximiliano Rodríguez (ESP)	23.52			
16	Julio Cesar Souza (BRA)	23.54			
17	Pasquale Gallo (FRA)	23.64			
18	Ali Ganfoudi (TUN)	23.75			
19	Joaquim Manuel (ANG)	23.90			
20	Federico Rodriguez (ARG)	23.91			
21	Richard Souci (MRI)	25.30			
22	Julio Roque (CUB)	26.15			
	Pedro Cesar Moraes (BRA)	DNS			
	Ranjesh Prakash (FIJ)	DNS			
