= Athletics at the 2008 Summer Paralympics – Men's 400 metres T12 =

The Men's 400m T12 had its first round held on September 11, beginning at 17:50. The Semifinals were held on September 12, at 18:20 and the Final was held on September 13 at 19:50.

== Medalists ==
Gold	Matthias Schroder; Germany
Silver	Luis Goncalves; Portugal
Bronze	Reza Osmanov; Azerbaijan

== Results ==
Place	Athlete	Round 1	Semifinals	Final
1	Matthias Schroder (GER)	50.47 Q	50.11 Q	49.45
2	Luis Goncalves (POR)	49.81 Q	50.48 q	50.15
3	Reza Osmanov (AZE)	51.03 Q	50.87 q	50.20
4	Yansong Li (CHN)	49.75 Q	50.73 Q	DSQ
5	Redouane Merah (ALG)	51.12 q	51.07	
6	Li Qiang (CHN)	50.50 q	51.20	
7	Daniel Wozniak (POL)	51.04 q	51.39	
8	Mahmoud Khaldi (TUN)	50.12 q	DNF	
9	Josiah Jamison (USA)	51.40		
10	Robert Rumanowski (POL)	51.67		
11	Jonathan Bernard (AUS)	52.11		
12	Julio Cesar Souza (BRA)	52.87		
13	Pedro Guilhermino (BRA)	56.14		
	Aliaksandr Kouzmichou (BLR)	DNF		
