= Powerlifting at the 2004 Summer Paralympics – Men's 48 kg =

Men's Up To 48 kg at the XII Paralympic Games
- Paralympic Powerlifting
- Venue: Nikaia Olympic Weightlifting Hall
- Dates: 20 September 2004
- Competitors: 14 from 14 nations
- Winning weight(kg): 167.5

Medalists
1st place, gold medalist(s)		Morteza Dashti	Iran
2nd place, silver medalist(s)		Thongsa Marasri	Thailand
3rd place, bronze medalist(s)		Ruel Ishaku	Nigeria

The Men's 48 kg powerlifting event at the 2004 Summer Paralympics was competed on 20 September. It was won by Morteza Dashti, representing Iran.

== Final round ==
20 Sept. 2004, 13:45

Rank	Athlete	Weight(kg)	Notes
1st place, gold medalist(s)	Morteza Dashti (IRI)	167.5	
2nd place, silver medalist(s)	Thongsa Marasri (THA)	165.0	
3rd place, bronze medalist(s)	Ruel Ishaku (NGR)	157.5	
4	Chen Shan Ming (CHN)	157.5	
5	Edmund Klimek (POL)	142.5	
6	Atajan Begniyazov (TKM)	130.0	
7	Alidou Diamoutene (CIV)	130.0	
8	Turan Mutlu (TUR)	125.0	
9	Wayne Sharpe (AUS)	125.0	
10	Cho Su Nam (KOR)	125.0	
11	Wan Kamarulzaman Wan Mohd Nor (MAS)	120.0	
	Anthony Peddle (GBR)	NMR	
	Sadun Wasana Perera (SRI)	NMR	
	Mondi Abd Elazim (EGY)	NMR	
