= Adesoji =

Adésọjí is a surname of Yoruba origin, meaning "the crown or royalty has woken up". Notable people with the surname include:

- Adekundo Adesoji, Nigerian Paralympic athlete
- Adekunle Adesoji, Nigerian Paralympic athlete
