= José Villarreal =

José Villarreal may refer to:

- José Carlos Villarreal (born 1997), Mexican middle-distance runner, Pan Am Games champion
- José Villarreal (athlete), paralympic athlete from Venezuela
- Jose Villarreal (soccer) (born 1993), American soccer player
- José Antonio Villarreal (1924–2010), Chicano novelist
- José Luis Villarreal (born 1966), Argentine association football coach and former player
