= José Alves =

José Alves may refer to:

- Zague (footballer, born 1934) (José Alves dos Santos, 1934–2021), Brazilian footballer
- José Alves (athlete) (born 1978), Portuguese Paralympic athlete
- Jose Alves Borges, Brazilian football manager
