= Powerlifting at the 2004 Summer Paralympics =

Powerlifting at the XII Paralympic Games
- Paralympic Powerlifting
- Venue: Nikaia Olympic Weightlifting Hall
- Dates: 20–27 September 2004
- Competitors: 229 from 69 nations

Powerlifting at the 2004 Summer Paralympics did not have disability categories. There was a requirement for a minimum level of physical disability, which may have been caused by amputation, cerebral palsy, spinal cord injuries or various other specified conditions. The only classification was by body weight. The event was staged in the Nikaia Olympic Weightlifting Hall.

== Participating countries ==
- Algeria (2)
- Armenia (1)
- Australia (4)
- Azerbaijan (1)
- Bahrain (2)
- Belarus (3)
- Benin (1)
- Brazil (2)
- Bulgaria (3)
- Canada (1)
- Cape Verde (1)
- Central African Republic (1)
- China (19)
- Chinese Taipei (3)
- Ivory Coast (1)
- Cuba (2)
- Ecuador (3)
- Egypt (16)
- Estonia (1)
- France (3)
- Germany (2)
- Great Britain (5)
- Greece (7)
- Hungary (2)
- India (2)
- Iran (8)
- Iraq (4)
- Japan (1)
- Jordan (3)
- Kazakhstan (1)
- Kenya (1)
- Kuwait (1)
- Kyrgyzstan (3)
- Libya (2)
- Lithuania (1)
- Malaysia (8)
- Mexico (8)
- Moldova (1)
- Morocco (4)
- Namibia (1)
- New Zealand (1)
- Nigeria (10)
- Norway (1)
- Oman (2)
- Peru (1)
- Philippines (2)
- Poland (10)
- Qatar (1)
- Romania (1)
- Russia (7)
- Saudi Arabia (4)
- Slovakia (4)
- South Korea (9)
- Spain (1)
- Sri Lanka (1)
- Syria (5)
- Tajikistan (1)
- Thailand (4)
- Turkey (2)
- Turkmenistan (4)
- Uganda (1)
- Ukraine (7)
- United Arab Emirates (1)
- United States (3)
- Uzbekistan (1)
- Venezuela (3)
- Vietnam (2)

== Medal table ==
Rank	Nation	Gold	Silver	Bronze	Total
1	Egypt (EGY)	5	6	2	13
2	China (CHN)	5	4	6	15
3	Iran (IRI)	2	0	3	5
4	Nigeria (NGR)	1	3	3	7
5	South Korea (KOR)	1	1	0	2
6	Iraq (IRQ)	1	0	1	2
6	Ukraine (UKR)	1	0	1	2
8	Chinese Taipei (TPE)	1	0	0	1
8	Great Britain (GBR)	1	0	0	1
8	Russia (RUS)	1	0	0	1
8	United Arab Emirates (UAE)	1	0	0	1
12	France (FRA)	0	2	0	2
13	Mexico (MEX)	0	1	2	3
14	Australia (AUS)	0	1	0	1
14	Poland (POL)	0	1	0	1
14	Thailand (THA)	0	1	0	1
17	Hungary (HUN)	0	0	1	1
17	India (IND)	0	0	1	1
Totals (18 entries)		20	20	20	60

== Medal summary ==
=== Men's events ===
Event	Gold	Silver	Bronze
48 kg	Morteza Dashti; Iran	Thongsa Marasri; Thailand	Ruel Ishaku; Nigeria
52 kg	Osama El Serngawy; Egypt	Wu Guojing; China	Gholam Hossein Chaltoukkar; Iran
56 kg	Jian Wang; China	Ahmed Ahmed; Egypt	Rajinder Singh Rahelu; India
60 kg	Shaban Ibrahim; Egypt	Keum Jong Jung; South Korea	Yu Jian; China
67.5 kg	Metwaly Mathna; Egypt	Wu Maoshun; China	Hamzeh Mohammadi; Iran
75 kg	Hai Dong Zhang; China	El Sayed Abd Elaal; Egypt	Reza Boroumand; Iran
82.5 kg	Mohammed Khamis Khalaf; United Arab Emirates	Mostafa Hamed; Egypt	Thaair Hussin; Iraq
90 kg	Jong Chul Park; South Korea	Ryszard Rogala; Poland	Ya Dong Wu; China
100 kg	Kazem Rajabi; Iran	Solomon Ikechukwu Amarakuo; Nigeria	Li Bing; China
+100 kg	Faris Abed; Iraq	Darren Gardiner; Australia	Csaba Szavai; Hungary

Note - Habibollah Mousavi Gold medallist in +100 kg was disqualified after a positive doping test.

=== Women's events ===
Event	Gold	Silver	Bronze
40 kg	Lidiya Solovyova; Ukraine	Ijeoma John; Nigeria	Laura Cerero Gabriel; Mexico
44 kg	Lucy Ogechukwu Ejike; Nigeria	Gihan El-Aziz Baioumy; Egypt	Xiao Cuijuan; China
48 kg	Bian Jianxin; China	Amalia Perez Vazquez; Mexico	Olena Kiseolar; Ukraine
52 kg	Tamara Podpalnaya; Russia	Abir Nail; Egypt	Yan Yang; China
56 kg	Fatma Omar; Egypt	Aghimile Patience Igbiti; Nigeria	Zhenling Huo; China
60 kg	Taoying Fu; China	Souhad Ghazouani; France	Amany Aly; Egypt
67.5 kg	Heba Ahmed; Egypt	Li Ping Zhang; China	Catalina Diaz Vilchis; Mexico
75 kg	Lin Tzu-hui; Chinese Taipei	Mingxia Zhu; China	Kike Adedeji Ogunbamowo; Nigeria
82.5 kg	Emma Brown; Great Britain	Carine Burgy; France	Hend Abd Elaty; Egypt
+82.5 kg	Rui Fang Li; China	Nadia Fekry; Egypt	Ebere Grace Anozie; Nigeria

== See also ==
- Weightlifting at the 2004 Summer Olympics
