= Morteza Dashti =

Iranian Paralympic powerlifter

Sport
- Country: Iran
- Sport: Paralympic powerlifting
Medal record
Paralympic Games
Gold medal – first place	2004 Athens	48 kg

Morteza Dashti is an Iranian Paralympic powerlifter. He represented Iran at the 2004 Summer Paralympics and at the 2008 Summer Paralympics and he won the gold medal in the men's 48 kg event in 2004. In 2008, he competed in the men's 48 kg event without a successful lift.
