= Ángel Jiménez (long jumper) =

Cuban Paralympic athlete

Medal record

Paralympic athletics

Representing Cuba

Paralympic Games
Gold medal – first place	2004 Athens	Long jump - F13
Silver medal – second place	2004 Athens	4x100 metre relay - T11-13
Gold medal – first place	2012 London	Long jump - F13

IPC World Championships
Gold medal – first place	2006 Assen	Long jump F13
Silver medal – second place	2002 Lille	Long jump F13

Parapan American Games
Silver medal – second place	2011 Guadalajara	Long jump F13
Bronze medal – third place	2015 Toronto	Long jump T13

Ángel Jiménez Cabeza is a Paralympic athlete from Cuba competing mainly in category F13 long jump events.

Jiménez is a double gold medalist winning the long jump in both the 2004 Summer Paralympics in Athens and the 2012 Summer Paralympics in London. He also won a silver medal in the 4 × 100 m relay team (T11-T13).
