= Adekunle Adesoji =

Nigerian Paralympic sprinter

Medal record

Men's paralympic athletics

Representing Nigeria

Paralympic Games
Gold medal – first place	2004 Athens	100 m T12
Silver medal – second place	2008 Beijing	100 m T12

Adekunle Adesojiis a Paralympian athlete from Nigeria competing mainly in category, T12 sprint events.

He won the gold in the 100 metres EAD, at the 2002 Commonwealth Games and another in the 100 m EAD T12 at the 2006 Commonwealth Games. He set Commonwealth Games records in both his victories. His run of 10.76 seconds at the 2002 Games was a world record for the T12 event.

He won the gold at the 2004 Summer Paralympics in Athens, running a new personal best and world record of 10.75 seconds.

He competed in the 2008 Summer Paralympics in Beijing, China. There he won a silver medal in the men's 100 metres – T12 event and finished fourth in the men's 200 metres – T12 event.
