= Aníbal Bello =

Venezuelan Paralympic athlete

Medal record

Paralympic athletics

Representing Venezuela

Paralympic Games
Bronze medal – third place	2004 Athens	4x100 metre relay T11-13

Parapan American Games
Bronze medal – third place	2011 Guadalajara	Shot put F12
Bronze medal – third place	2015 Toronto	Javelin throw F11/12
Bronze medal – third place	2015 Toronto	Shot put F11/12

Aníbal Bello is a paralympic athlete from Venezuela competing mainly in category F11 throws events.

Although Anibal competed in the javelin and shot at the 2004 Summer Paralympics it was only when he ran as part of the Venezuelan T11-13 4 × 100 m relay team that he won his only Paralympic medal, a bronze.
