= Paul Harpur =

Australian Paralympic athlete (born 1979)

Paul Harpur OAM
Personal information
- Nationality: Australia
- Born: Brisbane, Queensland, Australia

Paul David Harpur is an Australian Paralympian as an athlete with a vision impairment, a lawyer, and university professor at the University of Queensland. He is known for his expertise in anti-discrimination laws, human rights law, labour laws, and work health and safety laws.

== Early life and education ==
Paul David Harpur attended Cavendish Road State High School from 1994 until 1997. He lost his sight at the age of 14 when hit by an electric train at Wynnum, Brisbane.

Harpur started his law degree in 1998, graduating in 2003, whilst engaged with sports.

== Legal and academic career ==
A qualified solicitor, Harpur's university teaching areas include anti-discrimination laws, human rights, labour laws, and work health and safety laws.

He has occupied various academic positions at the University of Queensland (UQ) since 2011.

Harpur's 2019 Fulbright Future Scholarship was "Universally designed for whom? Disability, the law and practice of expanding the 'normal user'". In 2021 he was also awarded an Australian Research Council Future Fellowship, investigating how the higher education sector can better support persons with disabilities.

As of 2024, Harpur is a professor at the TC Beirne School of Law at the University of Queensland.

Harpur has numerous publications including Discrimination, copyright and equality: Opening the e-book for the print disabled (2017), and Ableism at work, disablement and hierarchies of impairment (2019).

== Sports ==
With totally or almost totally blind vision, as an athlete, Harpur is given as B1 Paralympic classification. He has completed in a number of world sporting events, including:

- goalball at the 2000 Summer Paralympics, in October 2000, in Sydney, New South Wales, Australia, with the Australian team;
- athletics at the 2002 Commonwealth Games, in July 2002, in Manchester, England – 100 m Elite Athletes with a Disability (EAD), coming third in the semi-finals at 12.57 s;
- athletics at the 2004 Summer Paralympics, in September 2004, in Athens, Greece – Sprinting in the men's track in the T11 classification, 200 m and placing seventh in the 400 m
- athletics at the 2006 Commonwealth Games in March 2005, in Melbourne, Victoria, Australia – 100 m EAD, T12 classification, placing third in the semi-finals with 12.20 s. He set an Australian record, at 26 years of age.

Part of his philosophy is "Impossible is only two letters from possible and you do not need sight to have vision".

== Other activities ==
Harpur has given TEDx presentations ("Universities as disability champions of change"), and addressed the International Labour Organization in Geneva.

He is an ambassador for the Australian Human Rights IncludeAbility Network, and chairs the UQ Disability Inclusion Group.

As of 2024, also at UQ, he is a member of the Senate Committee for Equity, Diversity and Inclusion, as well as the Senate Sub-Committee for Inclusion, and has been a member of the Olympics and Paralympics Oversight Committee since 2022. He has been a member of the Academic Board since 2015.

He has undertaken research under the auspices of the Australian Research Council.

== Recognition and honours ==
A school house at his high school, Cavendish Road State High School, was named after Harpur.

He has been recognised for his role in creating and serving as chair of the University of Queensland Disability Inclusion Group, which has received multiple awards, including: the University of Queensland 2019 Excellence Award, the University of Queensland Community, Diversity and Inclusion Award, and the Champions for Change Award by the National Centre for Student Equity in Higher Education & Equity Practitioners in Higher Education Australasia.

He was a visiting fellow at the Centre for Disability Law and Policy, Institute for Lifecourse and Society, National University of Ireland, in Galway.

Since 2016, he has been International Distinguished Fellow at the Burton Blatt Institute, Syracuse University College of Law.

Harpur received a 2019 Citation for Outstanding Contributions to Student Learning, from the Australian Award for University Teaching (AAUT) program, "for outstanding leadership in translating disability strategy into a vision of ability equality and core university business."

From 2019 until 2022, he was an academic fellow of the Harvard Law School Project on Disability, and since 2023 an associate of the project.

Since 2019 he has been a fellow of the Higher Education Academy in the UK.

In 2021, he was awarded 2022 Blind Australian of the Year.

In 2022, he was appointed to the Universities Accord Ministerial Reference Group to represent disability.

=== Honours ===
In 2001, Harpur was awarded a Centenary Medal, for service to the community.

On 26 January 2024, Harpur was awarded an Medal of the Order of Australia (OAM) "for service to people with disability", in the 2024 Australia Day Honours.

== Publications ==
As of 2024 Harpur has authored or co-authored over 200 academic publications, and is the author of two books:

- Ableism at work: disablement and hierarchies of impairments, Cambridge University Press, 2019.
- Discrimination, Copyright and Equality: Opening the E-Book for the Print Disabled, Cambridge University Press, 2017.

== See also ==
- Australia men's national goalball team
