= Fernando González (athlete) =

Cuban Paralympic athlete

Medal record

Paralympic athletics

Representing Cuba

Paralympic Games
Silver medal – second place	2004 Athens	4x100 metre relay - T11

Fernando González is a paralympic athlete from Cuba competing mainly in category T11 long and triple jump events.

Fernando competed at the 2004 Summer Paralympics in the long and triple jump but it was he teamed up with his Cuban teammates as part of the 4 × 100 m he won a silver medal.
