= Irving Bustamante =

Cuban Paralympic athlete

Medal record

Track and field (athletics)

Representing Cuba

Paralympic Games
Silver medal – second place	2004 Athens	4x100m - T11-13
Bronze medal – third place	2004 Athens	100 metres - T13
Bronze medal – third place	2004 Athens	200 metres - T13

Irving Bustamante is a Paralympic athlete from Cuba competing mainly in category T13 sprint events.

Irving competed in the 2004 Summer Paralympics, winning a silver as part of the Cuban 4 × 100 m team and two individual bronze medals in the 100m and 200m.
