= Ricardo Santana =

Venezuelan Paralympic athlete

Medal record

Track and field (athletics)

Representing Venezuela

Paralympic Games
Silver medal – second place	2004 Athens	100 metres - T12
Silver medal – second place	2008 Beijing	4x100m - T11-13
Bronze medal – third place	2000 Sydney	200 metres - T13
Bronze medal – third place	2004 Athens	200 metres - T12
Bronze medal – third place	2004 Athens	4x100m - T11-13

Ricardo Santana is a Paralympian athlete from Venezuela competing mainly in category T12 sprint events.

Ricardo has competed and medalled at three Paralympics. His first was in Sydney in 2000 where having competed in the T13 100m and 400m he picked up a bronze medal in the T13 200m. In the 2004 Summer Paralympics in Athens having been reclassified into T12 won a silver medal in the 100m and a bronze in the 200m and was part of the Venezuelan team that finished third in the T11-13 4 × 100 m relay. His third appearance was in 2008 Summer Paralympics in Beijing where he failed to win any medals in the T12 100m or 200m but did win a silver as part of the T11-13 4 × 100 m team.
