= Shigeki Yano =

Japanese Paralympic athlete

Medal record

Paralympic athletics

Representing Japan

Paralympic Games
Silver medal – second place	2000 Sydney	4x100 metre relay - T13

Shigeki Yano (矢野 繁樹, Yano Shigeki) is a paralympic athlete from Japan competing mainly in category T11 sprint events.

Shigeki competed in the 100m and 200m at three consecutive Paralympics in 1996, 2000 and 2004, however he only won one medal and that was a silver medal as part of the Japanese 4 × 100 m relay team in 2000.
