= Ruel Ishaku =

Nigerian Paralympic powerlifter (born 1967)

Personal information
- Nationality: Nigerian
- Born: 11 January 1967 (age 59) Nigeria

Sport
- Sport: Powerlifting
Medal record
Representing Nigeria
Paralympic Games
Powerlifting
Bronze medal – third place	2004 Athens	Men's 48kg
Gold medal – first place	2008 Beijing	Men's 48kg
Commonwealth Games
Powerlifting
Gold medal – first place	2006 Melbourne	Men's Open

Ruel Ishaku (born 11 January 1967) is a Nigerian Paralympic gold medal-winning powerlifter. He was elected President of the Nigeria Para-Powerlifting Federation from 2020 till 2022 replacing the past leader Uboh Idris. Ishaku was first elected as the representative of the board of the Paralympic association after defeating Tajudeen Agunbiade, a table tennis player by 27 votes. He was later appointed the Technical Director after his rule as president in 2022.

== Biography ==
Ishaku was born in 1967 in Nigeria. He suffers from poliomyelitis which means he has to walk with the use of crutches. He started his career in 1991. During the 2008 interview, he said;

When I was a kid, I was interested in weightlifting. So when I heard about that powerlifting could be a sport for the disabled in 1991, I decided to have a try.

—

== Career ==
Ishaku made his debut at the 2000 Summer Paralympics. He competed in the Men's up to 48 kg but did not record a valid lift.

He competed at the 2004 Summer Paralympics and won bronze in the same event. At the 2008 Summer Paralympics he won the gold medal.

Ishaku competed in and won gold at the 2006 Commonwealth Games in powerlifting. It was the only weightlifting event that Nigeria was allowed to enter as the nation was banned from able-bodied lifting when three of its lifters infringed anti-doping rules.

=== Legacy ===
Ishaku has been cited to have influenced Yakubu Adesokan after Adesokan won the 2012 game surpassing his record in 2008.
