= Odúver Daza =

Venezuelan Paralympic athlete

Medal record

Paralympic athletics

Representing Venezuela

Paralympic Games
Silver medal – second place	2008 Beijing	4x100m - T11-13
Bronze medal – third place	2004 Athens	4x100m - T11-13

Odúver Daza is a Paralympian athlete from Venezuela competing mainly in category T12 sprint events.

Oduver has competed in two Paralympics, firstly in 2004 in Athens and then in 2008 in Beijing. In Athens he competed in the T12 100m and F12 long jump failing to win any medals, in Beijing he again failed to win a medal in the F12 long jump, he however was a part of successful Venezuelan relay teams on both occasions winning a bronze in Athens in the T11-13 4 × 100 m and a silver in the same event in Beijing finishing behind the host country.
