= Ioannis Protos =

Greek Paralympic athlete

Medal record

Men's paralympic athletics

Representing Greece

Paralympic Games
| Bronze medal – third place | 2004 Athens | 400 m T13 |

IPC World Championships
| Bronze medal – third place | 2011 Christchurch | 100 m T13 |

Ioannis Protos is a Hellene Paralympian athlete from Soroni, Rhodes, born in September 26, 1982 and competing mainly in category T13 sprint events.

He competed in the 2004 Summer Paralympics in Athens, Greece. There he finished sixth in the men's 100 metres – T13 event and finished fourth in the men's 200 metres – T13 event. He also competed at the 2008 Summer Paralympics in Beijing, China. There he won a bronze medal in the men's 400 metres – T13 event and finished seventh in the men's 200 metres – T13 event. The local Soroni athletic center bare his name.
