= Arián Iznaga =

Cuban Paralympic sprinter

Medal record

Track and field (T11)

Representing Cuba

Paralympic Games
| Silver medal – second place | 2004 Athens | 4x100 metre relay T11 |
| Bronze medal – third place | 2008 Beijing | 200m T11 |

Parapan American Games
| Silver medal – second place | 2011 Guadalajara | 400m T11 |
| Bronze medal – third place | 2011 Guadalajara | 100m T11 |
| Bronze medal – third place | 2011 Guadalajara | 200m T11 |

Arián Iznaga Aldiles (Villa Clara Province) is a Paralympic athlete from Cuba competing mainly in category T11 sprint events.

Arian competed at the 2004 Summer Paralympics in the 100m and 200m but it was he teamed up with his Cuban teammates as part of the 4 × 100 m he won a silver medal. He competed in the 2008 Summer Paralympics in Beijing, China. There he won a bronze medal in the men's 200 metres - T11 event
