= Nigeria at the 2004 Summer Paralympics =

- IPC code: NGR
- NPC: Nigeria Paralympic Committee

in Athens
- Competitors: 14 in 2 sports
- Medals Ranked 28th: Gold 5 Silver 4 Bronze 3 Total 12

Summer Paralympics appearances (overview)
- 1992; 1996; 2000; 2004; 2008; 2012; 2016; 2020; 2024

Nigeria competed at the 2004 Summer Paralympics in Athens, Greece. The team included 14 athletes, 6 men and 8 women. Competitors from Nigeria won 12 medals, including 5 gold, 4 silver and 3 bronze.

In many parts of Black Africa, people who have disabilities that include insanity, and physical disabilities such as impairments and deformities often face cultural barriers to participation because of attitudes related to their disabilities. These include beliefs that they acquired their disabilities because their parents were witches or they are wizards. Their disability is often seen as a result of a personal failing on their part. As such, there is often tremendous cultural pressure for people with physical disabilities to remain hidden and out of the public eye. In many places, they are perceived to be monsters in need of healing. This is the context to which Nigerian Paralympians engage both society and sport internally, in their own country.

== Medals ==
Competitors from Nigeria won 12 medals, including 5 gold, 4 silver and 3 bronze to finish 28th in the medal table. The Nigerian Paralympic delegation left the Games having won more medals than their Olympic counterparts.

Medal	Name	Sport	Event
Gold	Adekundo Adesoji	Athletics	Men's 100m T12
Gold	Adekundo Adesoji	Athletics	Men's 200m T12
Gold	Adekundo Adesoji	Athletics	Men's 400m T12
Gold	Silver Ezeikpe	Athletics	Men's javelin throw F58
Gold	Lucy Ogechukwu Ejike	Powerlifting	Women's 44kg
Silver	Eucharia Njideka Iyiazi	Athletics	Women's javelin throw F56-58
Silver	Solomon Ikechukwu Amarakuo	Powerlifting	Men's 100kg
Silver	Ijeoma John	Powerlifting	Women's 40kg
Silver	Aghimile Patience Igbiti	Powerlifting	Women's 56kg
Bronze	Ruel Ishaku	Powerlifting	Men's 48kg
Bronze	Kike Adedeji Ogunbamowo	Powerlifting	Women's 75kg
Bronze	Ebere Grace Anozie	Powerlifting	Women's +82.5kg

== Sports ==
=== Athletics ===
==== Men's track ====
Athlete	Class	Event	Heats		Semifinal		Final	
Athlete	Class	Event	Result	Rank	Result	Rank	Result	Rank
Adekundo Adesoji	T12	100m	10.77 PR	1 Q	10.78	1 Q	10.75 WR	1st place, gold medalist(s)
Adekundo Adesoji	T12	200m	21.77 WR	1 Q	22.02	2 Q	21.78	1st place, gold medalist(s)
Adekundo Adesoji	T12	400m	49.56 PR	1 Q	49.82	1 Q	48.93 PR	1st place, gold medalist(s)
Chijoke Kingsley	T11	100m	11.86	7 Q	11.80	5 q	11.80	1
Chijoke Kingsley	T11	200m	24.20	4 q	24.38	11	did not advance	
Chijoke Kingsley	T11	400m	54.33	9	did not advance			

==== Men's field ====
Athlete	Class	Event	Final		
Athlete	Class	Event	Result	Points	Rank
Silver Ezeikpe	F56	Shot put	DSQ		
Silver Ezeikpe	F58	Javelin	50.72 WR	-	1st place, gold medalist(s)

==== Women's field ====
Athlete	Class	Event	Final		
Athlete	Class	Event	Result	Points	Rank
Njideka E. Iyiazi	F56-58	Discus	29.84	962	10
Njideka E. Iyiazi	F56-58	Javelin	27.61	1105	2nd place, silver medalist(s)
Njideka E. Iyiazi	F56-58	Shot put	10.12 WR	1106	4

=== Powerlifting ===
==== Men ====
Athlete	Event	Result	Rank
Okechukwu Alfa	75kg	190.0	6
Solomon Amarakuo	100kg	235.0	2nd place, silver medalist(s)
Ruel Ishaku	48kg	157.5	3rd place, bronze medalist(s)

==== Women ====
Athlete	Event	Result	Rank
Grace Anozie	+82.5kg	140.0	3rd place, bronze medalist(s)
Lucy Ejike	44kg	127.5 WR	1st place, gold medalist(s)
Aghimile Patience Igbiti	56kg	122.5	2nd place, silver medalist(s)
Iyabo Ismaila	52kg	NMR	
Ijeoma John	40kg	97.5	2nd place, silver medalist(s)
Victoria Nneji	67.5kg	NMR	
Kike Adedeji Ogunbamowo	75kg	120.0	3rd place, bronze medalist(s)

== See also ==
- Nigeria at the Paralympics
- Nigeria at the 2004 Summer Olympics
