= Conal McNamara =

Irish Paralympic athlete

Medal record

Paralympic athletics

Representing Ireland

Paralympic Games
Silver medal – second place	2004 Athens	400 metres - T13

Conal McNamara is a paralympic athlete from Ireland competing mainly in category T13 sprint events.

Conal competed in the 200m and 400m for class T13 athletes in the 2004 Summer Paralympics winning the silver in the longer sprint.
