= Wu Xiang (athlete) =

Chinese Paralympic athlete

Personal information
- Born: 4 April 1980 (age 46)

Sport
- Sport: Paralympic athletics
Medal record
Men's para-athletics
Representing China
Paralympic Games
Gold medal – first place	2004 Athens	4x100 m relay T11-13
World Championships
Silver medal – second place	2002 Villeneuve d'Ascq	4x400 m T11-13
Bronze medal – third place	2006 Assen	400 m T11
Asian Para Games
Silver medal – second place	2010 Guangzhou	100m T11
Silver medal – second place	2010 Guangzhou	200m T11

Wu Xiang (born 4 April 1980) is a paralympic athlete from China competing mainly in category T11 sprint events.

He competed in both the 100m and 200m in the Paralympics in Athens and Beijing but his only medal, a gold, came as part of the Chinese T11-13 4 × 100 m relay team in the games in Athens.
