= Belarus at the 2004 Summer Paralympics =

- IPC code: BLR
- NPC: Paralympic Committee of the Republic of Belarus

in Athens
- Competitors: 33 in 5 sports
- Medals Ranked 19th: Gold 10 Silver 12 Bronze 7 Total 29

Summer Paralympics appearances (overview)
- 1996; 2000; 2004; 2008; 2012; 2016; 2020; 2024

Other related appearances
- Soviet Union (1988); Unified Team (1992)

Belarus competed at the 2004 Summer Paralympics in Athens, Greece. The team included 33 athletes, 20 men and 13 women. Competitors from Belarus won 29 medals, including 10 gold, 12 silver and 7 bronze to finish 19th in the medal table.

== Medallists ==
Medal	Name	Sport	Event
Gold	Aliaksandr Tryputs	Athletics	Men's javelin throw F12
Gold	Ihar Fartunau	Athletics	Men's pentathlon P13
Gold	Volha Zinkevich	Athletics	Women's long jump F12
Gold	Tamara Sivakova	Athletics	Women's shot put F12
Gold	Aliaksandr Danilik; Vasili Shaptsiaboi	Cycling	Men's tandem road race/time trial B1-3
Gold	Raman Makarau	Swimming	Men's 100m freestyle S12
Gold	Sergei Punko	Swimming	Men's 400m freestyle S12
Gold	Raman Makarau	Swimming	Men's 100m butterfly S12
Gold	Raman Makarau	Swimming	Men's 100m backstroke S12
Gold	Sergei Punko	Swimming	Men's 200m individual medley SM12
Silver	Ihar Fartunau	Athletics	Men's long jump F13
Silver	Aliaksandr Kuzmichou	Athletics	Men's triple jump F12
Silver	Viktar Khilmonchyk	Athletics	Men's shot put F42
Silver	Aliaksandr Tryputs	Athletics	Men's pentathlon P13
Silver	Volha Zinkevich	Athletics	Women's 100m T12
Silver	Volha Zinkevich	Athletics	Women's 200m T12
Silver	Tamara Sivakova	Athletics	Women's discus throw F13
Silver	Raman Makarau	Swimming	Men's 50m freestyle S12
Silver	Sergei Punko	Swimming	Men's 100m butterfly S12
Silver	Sergei Punko	Swimming	Men's 100m breaststroke SB12
Silver	Raman Makarau	Swimming	Men's 200m individual medley SM12
Silver	Dmitri Kravtsevich; Raman Makarau; Sergei Punko; Yury Rudzenok	Swimming	Men's 4x100m freestyle relay 49pts
Bronze	Aliaksandr Kuzmichou	Athletics	Men's 400m T12
Bronze	Siarhei Hrybanan	Athletics	Men's discus throw F13
Bronze	Hanna Kaniuk	Athletics	Women's long jump F12
Bronze	Aksana Sivitskaya	Athletics	Women's long jump F13
Bronze	Sergei Punko	Swimming	Men's 100m freestyle S12
Bronze	Raman Makarau	Swimming	Men's 400m freestyle S12
Bronze	Dmitri Kravtsevich; Raman Makarau; Sergei Punko; Yury Rudzenok	Swimming	Men's 4x100m medley relay 49pts

== Sports ==
=== Archery ===
Athlete	Event	Ranking round		Round of 32	Round of 16	Quarterfinals	Semifinals	Finals	
Athlete	Event	Score	Seed	Opposition score	Opposition score	Opposition score	Opposition score	Opposition score	Rank
Tatsiana Hryshko	Women's individual standing	497	16	N/A	Carmichael (USA); L 113-145	did not advance			

=== Athletics ===
==== Men's track ====
Athlete	Class	Event	Heats		Semifinal		Final	
Athlete	Class	Event	Result	Rank	Result	Rank	Result	Rank
Aliaksandr Batsian	T12	100m	11.71	19	did not advance			
Aliaksandr Batsian	T12	200m	24.24	23	did not advance			
Ihar Fartunau	T13	100m	11.42	8 Q	N/A		DNS	
Ihar Fartunau	T13	200m	25.20	11	did not advance			
Aliaksandr Kuzmichou	T12	200m	22.94	5 Q	22.68	7 B	23.08	3
Aliaksandr Kuzmichou	T12	400m	50.55	2 Q	50.51	2 q	49.70	3rd place, bronze medalist(s)

==== Men's field ====
Athlete	Class	Event	Final		
Athlete	Class	Event	Result	Points	Rank
Yuri Buchkou	F12	Discus	41.79	-	6
Yuri Buchkou	F13	Shot put	15.01	-	4
Ihar Fartunau	F13	Long jump	7.09	-	2nd place, silver medalist(s)
Ihar Fartunau	P13	Pentathlon	3017		1st place, gold medalist(s)
Siarhei Hrybanan	F13	Discus	41.85	-	3rd place, bronze medalist(s)
Siarhei Hrybanan	F13	Shot put	14.14	-	7
Viktar Khilmonchyk	F42	Discus	42.74	-	4
Viktar Khilmonchyk	F42	Shot put	13.19	-	2nd place, silver medalist(s)
Aliaksandr Kuzmichou	F12	Triple jump	14.59	-	2nd place, silver medalist(s)
Siarhei Siamianiaka	F13	Discus	31.02	-	6
Siarhei Siamianiaka	F13	Javelin	44.67	-	4
Ruslan Sivitski	F12	Triple jump	14.38	-	5
Aliaksandr Subota	F46	Long jump	6.37	-	7
Aliaksandr Subota	F46	Triple jump	DNF		
Aliaksandr Tryputs	F12	Javelin	56.63 PR	-	1st place, gold medalist(s)
Aliaksandr Tryputs	P13	Pentathlon	2939		2nd place, silver medalist(s)
Viktar Zhukouski	F11	Long jump	5.83	-	8
Viktar Zhukouski	F11	Triple jump	11.90	-	7

==== Women's track ====
Athlete	Class	Event	Heats		Semifinal		Final	
Athlete	Class	Event	Result	Rank	Result	Rank	Result	Rank
Hanna Kaniuk	T12	100m	13.92	12 Q	DNF		did not advance	
Hanna Kaniuk	T12	200m	DNF		did not advance			
Iryna Leantsiuk	T46	100m	13.18	6 q	N/A		13.04	5
Iryna Leantsiuk	T46	200m	28.30	9	did not advance			
Aksana Sivitskaya	T13	100m	N/A				13.56	6
Volha Zinkevich	T12	100m	12.60 WR	1 Q	12.88	2 Q	12.46	2nd place, silver medalist(s)
Volha Zinkevich	T12	200m	25.65	2 Q	25.57	2 Q	25.87	2nd place, silver medalist(s)
Volha Zinkevich	T12	400m	1:02.12	6 Q	58.65	4 q	1:00.04	4

==== Women's field ====
Athlete	Class	Event	Final		
Athlete	Class	Event	Result	Points	Rank
Hanna Kaniuk	F12	Long jump	5.48	-	3rd place, bronze medalist(s)
Iryna Leantsiuk	F44/46	Long jump	5.71 PR	1045	6
Tamara Sivakova	F12	Shot put	12.82 PR	-	1st place, gold medalist(s)
Tamara Sivakova	F13	Discus	41.32	-	2nd place, silver medalist(s)
Aksana Sivitskaya	F13	Long jump	5.22	-	3rd place, bronze medalist(s)
Volha Zinkevich	F12	Long jump	5.66 WR	-	1st place, gold medalist(s)

=== Cycling ===
==== Men's road ====
Athlete	Event	Time	Rank
Vasili Shaptsiaboi; Aliaksandr Danilik (pilot)	Men's road race / time trial tandem B1-3	3:06:54	1st place, gold medalist(s)

==== Men's track ====
Athlete	Event	Qualification		1st round		Final	
Athlete	Event	Time	Rank	Time	Rank	Opposition Time	Rank
Vasili Shaptsiaboi; Aliaksandr Danilik	Men's individual pursuit B1-3	4:43.25	10	did not advance			

==== Women's road ====
Athlete	Event	Time	Rank
Iryna Fiadotava; Aksana Zviahintsava	Women's road race / time trial tandem B1-3	-	12
Yadviha Skorabahataya; Natallia Piatrova	Women's road race / time trial tandem B1-3	-	5

==== Women's track ====
Athlete	Event	Qualification		1st round		Final	
Athlete	Event	Time	Rank	Time	Rank	Opposition Time	Rank
Iryna Fiadotava; Aksana Zviahintsava	Women's 1km time trial tandem B1-3	N/A				1:25.30	13
Iryna Fiadotava; Aksana Zviahintsava	Women's individual pursuit tandem B1-3	3:50.60	6 Q	Shaw (AUS) / McCombie (AUS); L 3:49.42	6	did not advance	
Yadviha Skorabahataya; Natallia Piatrova	Women's 1km time trial tandem B1-3	N/A				1:18.04	9
Yadviha Skorabahataya; Natallia Piatrova	Women's individual pursuit tandem B1-3	4:00.60	10	did not advance			

=== Powerlifting ===
==== Men ====
Athlete	Event	Result	Rank
Vladimir Buben	+100kg	200.0	5
Siarhei Kryvulets	100kg	215.0	6

==== Women ====
Athlete	Event	Result	Rank
Liudmila Hreben	+82.5kg	125.0	6

=== Swimming ===
==== Men ====
Athlete	Class	Event	Heats		Final	
Athlete	Class	Event	Result	Rank	Result	Rank
Mikalai Kalatski	SB8	100m breaststroke	DSQ		did not advance	
Dmitri Kravtsevich	S12	100m freestyle	1:05.85	18	did not advance	
Dmitri Kravtsevich	S12	400m freestyle	5:00.57	10	did not advance	
Dmitri Kravtsevich	S12	100m backstroke	1:15.76	12	did not advance	
Raman Makarau	S12	50m freestyle	25.58 PR	1 Q	25.27	2nd place, silver medalist(s)
Raman Makarau	S12	100m freestyle	55.83 PR	1 Q	54.49 WR	1st place, gold medalist(s)
Raman Makarau	S12	400m freestyle	4:30.26	3 Q	4:23.19	3rd place, bronze medalist(s)
Raman Makarau	S12	100m backstroke	1:05.07	2 Q	1:02.75 PR	1st place, gold medalist(s)
Raman Makarau	S12	100m butterfly	1:00.22 PR	1 Q	58.79 PR	1st place, gold medalist(s)
Raman Makarau	SB12	100m breaststroke	1:19.62	11	did not advance	
Raman Makarau	SM12	200m individual medley	2:22.50	3 Q	2:17.88	2nd place, silver medalist(s)
Sergei Punko	S12	50m freestyle	25.97	4 Q	25.88	4
Sergei Punko	S12	100m freestyle	56.29	2 Q	55.54	3rd place, bronze medalist(s)
Sergei Punko	S12	400m freestyle	4:16.98	1 Q	4:11.58 WR	1st place, gold medalist(s)
Sergei Punko	S12	100m backstroke	1:10.34	9	did not advance	
Sergei Punko	S12	100m butterfly	1:03.94	4 Q	1:00.18	2nd place, silver medalist(s)
Sergei Punko	SB12	100m breaststroke	1:12.54	2 Q	1:11.27	2nd place, silver medalist(s)
Sergei Punko	SM12	200m individual medley	2:20.02 PR	1 Q	2:14.42 WR	1st place, gold medalist(s)
Yury Rudzenok	S12	50m freestyle	27.49	12	did not advance	
Yury Rudzenok	S12	100m butterfly	1:11.67	11	did not advance	
Yury Rudzenok	SB12	100m breaststroke	1:15.03	5 Q	1:14.29	6
Yury Rudzenok	SM12	200m individual medley	2:32.76	9	did not advance	
Dmitri Kravtsevich; Raman Makarau; Sergei Punko; Yury Rudzenok	N/A	4x100m freestyle relay (49pts)	N/A		3:55.73	2nd place, silver medalist(s)
Dmitri Kravtsevich; Raman Makarau; Sergei Punko; Yury Rudzenok	N/A	4x100m medley relay (49pts)	N/A		4:21.51	3rd place, bronze medalist(s)

==== Women ====
Athlete	Class	Event	Heats		Final	
Athlete	Class	Event	Result	Rank	Result	Rank
Natallia Shavel	S6	100m freestyle	1:48.71	16	did not advance	
Natallia Shavel	S6	100m backstroke	2:15.41	11	did not advance	
Natallia Shavel	S6	50m butterfly	53.46	14	did not advance	
Natallia Shavel	SB5	100m breaststroke	N/A		2:06.84	5
Iryna Vasilenka	S12	50m freestyle	32.97	13	did not advance	
Iryna Vasilenka	S12	100m backstroke	N/A		1:23.39	7
Iryna Vasilenka	SB12	100m breaststroke	1:29.51	7 Q	1:28.67	7
Iryna Vasilenka	SM12	200m individual medley	3:02.06	9	did not advance	

== See also ==
- Belarus at the Paralympics
- Belarus at the 2004 Summer Olympics
