= Matthias Schröder =

German Paralympic athlete

Medal record

Track and field (T12)

Representing Germany

Paralympic Games
Gold medal – first place	2008 Beijing	Men's 400 metres – T12
Silver medal – second place	2004 Athens	Men's 200 metres – T12
Bronze medal – third place	2004 Athens	Men's 200 metres – T12

World Championships
Silver medal – second place	2002 Villeneuve-d'Ascq	Men's 100 m T13
Silver medal – second place	2002 Villeneuve-d'Ascq	Men's 200 m T13
Silver medal – second place	2006 Assen	Men's 100 m T13
Silver medal – second place	2006 Assen	Men's 200 m T13
Bronze medal – third place	2006 Assen	Men's 4 × 100 m T11–13
Bronze medal – third place	2006 Assen	Men's long jump F13

Matthias Schröder, also spelled Schroeder, is a visually impaired Paralympic athlete from Germany competing in T12 (track) and F12 (field) events.

At the 2004 Summer Paralympics, he won a silver medal in the men's 200 metres T12 event, a bronze medal in the men's 200 metres – T12, and also competed in the men's 4 × 100 metre relay T11–T13 and men's long jump F12 events.

He competed in the 2008 Summer Paralympics in Beijing, China. There he won a gold medal in the men's 400 metres T12 event, finished seventh in the men's 100 metres T12 event, finished sixth in the men's 200 metres T12 event and went out in the first round of the men's 4 × 100 metre relay T11–13 event.

In 2009, Schröder set a new F12 Long Jump world record.

At the 2012 Summer Paralympics, he competed in the men's 200 metres T12 and men's 400 metres T12 events but did not win a medal. In 2012, the men's long jump event was not offered for athletes in his classification.
