= Luís Bullido =

Spanish Paralympic athlete

Medal record

Track and field (athletics)

Representing Spain

Paralympic Games
Silver medal – second place	2000 Sydney	400 metres - T11
Silver medal – second place	2000 Sydney	4x400 metre relay - T11-13
Silver medal – second place	2004 Athens	200 metres - T11
Silver medal – second place	2004 Athens	400 metres - T11
Bronze medal – third place	2004 Athens	100 metres - T11

Luís Bullido Arroyo (Note: In this Spanish name, the first or paternal surname is Bullido and the second or maternal family name is Arroyo.) (born 9 October 1978) is a paralympic athlete from Spain competing mainly in category T11 sprint events.

Luis made his first Paralympic games appearance in 1996 competing in the 400m. He returned to the 2000 Summer Paralympics in Sydney where he competed in the 200m and won a silver in the 400m before helping the Spanish 4 × 400 m to a silver. His third and final appearance in the Paralympics came in 2004 Summer Paralympics where he won another two silvers in the 200m and 400m and a bronze in the 100m.
