= Aliaksandr Kuzmichou =

Belarusian Paralympic athlete

Medal record

Paralympic athletics

Representing Belarus

Paralympic Games
Silver medal – second place	2004 Athens	Triple Jump - F12
Bronze medal – third place	2004 Athens	400 metres - T12

Aliaksandr Kuzmichou (Belarusian: Аляксандар Кузьмічоў) is a paralympic athlete from Belarus competing mainly in category T/F12 sprint and triple jump events.

Aliaksandr competed in the 2004 Summer Paralympics winning a bronze in the T12 400m and a silver in the F12 triple jump as well as competing in the 200m.
