= Adekundo Adesoji =

Nigerian Paralympic athlete

Medal record

Track and field (athletics)

Representing Nigeria

Paralympic Games
Gold medal – first place	2004 Athens	Men's 100 metres - T12
Gold medal – first place	2004 Athens	Men's 200 metres - T12
Gold medal – first place	2004 Athens	Men's 400 metres - T12

Adekundo Adesoji is a paralympic athlete from Nigeria competing mainly in category T12 sprint events.

Adekundo only ever competed at one Paralympics, the 2004 Summer Paralympics in Athens but it was a very successful games as he took a clean sweep of the T12 sprint gold medals, with gold in the 100m, 200m and 400m.
