= Royal Mitchell =

American Paralympian

Personal information
- Born: Columbia, South Carolina, United States

Sport
- Country: United States
- Sport: Paralympic athletics
- Disability: Myopia
- Disability class: T13
Medal record
Track and field (athletics)
Representing United States
Paralympic Games
Gold medal – first place	2000 Sydney	400 m T13
Gold medal – first place	2004 Athens	400 m T13
Gold medal – first place	2004 Athens	100 m T13
Parapan American Games
Gold medal – first place	2007 Rio de Janeiro	400 m T13
Silver medal – second place	2007 Rio de Janeiro	100 m T13
Bronze medal – third place	2007 Rio de Janeiro	200 m T13

Royal Mitchell is a paralympic athlete from the United States competing mainly in category T13 sprint events.

Royal Mitchell competed in the 2000 Summer Paralympics in all three T13 sprints winning the gold medal in the 400m. He defended this title in 2004 and added the 100m gold as well as competing in the 200m and the 4 × 100 m. He did the same events in 2008 but could not defend any of his titles and went home with no silverware to his name.
