= Aladji Ba =

French Paralympic athlete

Medal record

Track and field (athletics)

Representing France

Paralympic Games
Bronze medal – third place	2000 Sydney	400 metres - T11
Bronze medal – third place	2004 Athens	400 metres - T11

Aladji Ba is a Paralympian athlete from France competing mainly in category T11 sprint events.

Aladji has competed in three Paralympics and won two bronze medals in the 400m in 2000 and in 2004 and missing out in 2008
