= Oleksandr Ivaniukhin =

Ukrainian Paralympic athlete

Medal record

Track and field (T11)

Representing Ukraine

Paralympic Games
Silver medal – second place	2000 Sydney	Pentathlon - P11
Bronze medal – third place	2000 Sydney	100m - T11
Bronze medal – third place	2004 Athens	200m - T11
Bronze medal – third place	2008 Beijing	400m - T11

Oleksandr Ivaniukhin (Ukrainian: Олександр Іванюхін) is a Paralympian athlete from Ukraine competing mainly in category T11 sprint events.

He competed in the 2000 Summer Paralympics in Sydney, Australia. There he won a silver medal in the men's Pentathlon - P11 event, a bronze medal in the men's 100 metres - T11 event, finished fifth in the men's Long jump - F11 event and finished fifth in the men's Triple jump - F11 event. He also competed at the 2004 Summer Paralympics in Athens, Greece. There he won a bronze medal in the men's 200 metres - T11 event, finished fourth in the men's 100 metres - T11 event and finished fourth in the men's 400 metres - T11 event. In the 2008 Summer Paralympics in Beijing, China he won a bronze medal in the men's 400 metres - T11 event, went out in the quarter-finals of the men's 100 metres - T11 event and finished eighth in the men's 200 metres - T11 event
