= José Villarreal (athlete) =

Venezuelan Paralympic athlete

Medal record

Paralympic athletics

Representing Venezuela

Paralympic Games
| Bronze medal – third place | 2004 Athens | 4x100 metre relay - T11-13 |

José Villarreal is a paralympic track and field athlete from Venezuela competing mainly in category T12 sprint events.

== Biography ==
Although Jose competed in the 100m, 200m and 400m at the 2004 Summer Paralympics, it was only when he ran as part of the Venezuelan T11-13 4 × 100 m relay team that he won his only Paralympic medal, a bronze.
