= José Alves (athlete) =

Portuguese Paralympic athlete (born 1978)

Medal record

Track and field (T13)

Representing Portugal

Paralympic Games
Gold medal – first place	2000 Sydney	4x400m - T13
Bronze medal – third place	2000 Sydney	400m - T13
Bronze medal – third place	2000 Sydney	400m - T13

José Rodolfo Alves (born 13 August 1978) is a Paralympic athlete from Portugal. He mainly competes in category T13 sprint events.

He competed in the 2000 Summer Paralympics in Sydney, Australia. There he won a gold medal in the men's 4 x 400 metre relay T11-T13 event, a bronze medal in the men's 400 metres T13 event, went out in the semi-finals of the men's 100 metres T13 event and went out in the semi-finals of the men's 200 metres T13 event. He also competed at the 2004 Summer Paralympics in Athens, Greece. Winning a bronze medal in the men's 400 metres T13 event, he did not finish in the men's 200 metres T13 event and with the rest of the Portuguese relay team went out in the first round of the men's 4 x 100 metres T11-13 event.
