= Daniel Wozniak (athlete) =

Polish Paralympic athlete

Medal record

Track and field (athletics)

Representing Poland

Paralympic Games
Silver medal – second place	2000 Sydney	400 metres - T12

Daniel Wozniak is a paralympic athlete from Poland competing mainly in category T12 sprint events. Wozniak has competed in the sprints at three paralympics starting in 2000. In 2000 he competed in all three sprint events winning the silver medal in the 400m, at the following games in 2004 he again competed in all three sprints but failed to win any medals. In Beijing in the 2008 he competed in the 200m and 400m but again was unable to add to his medal tally.
