= Li Yansong =

Chinese Paralympic athlete

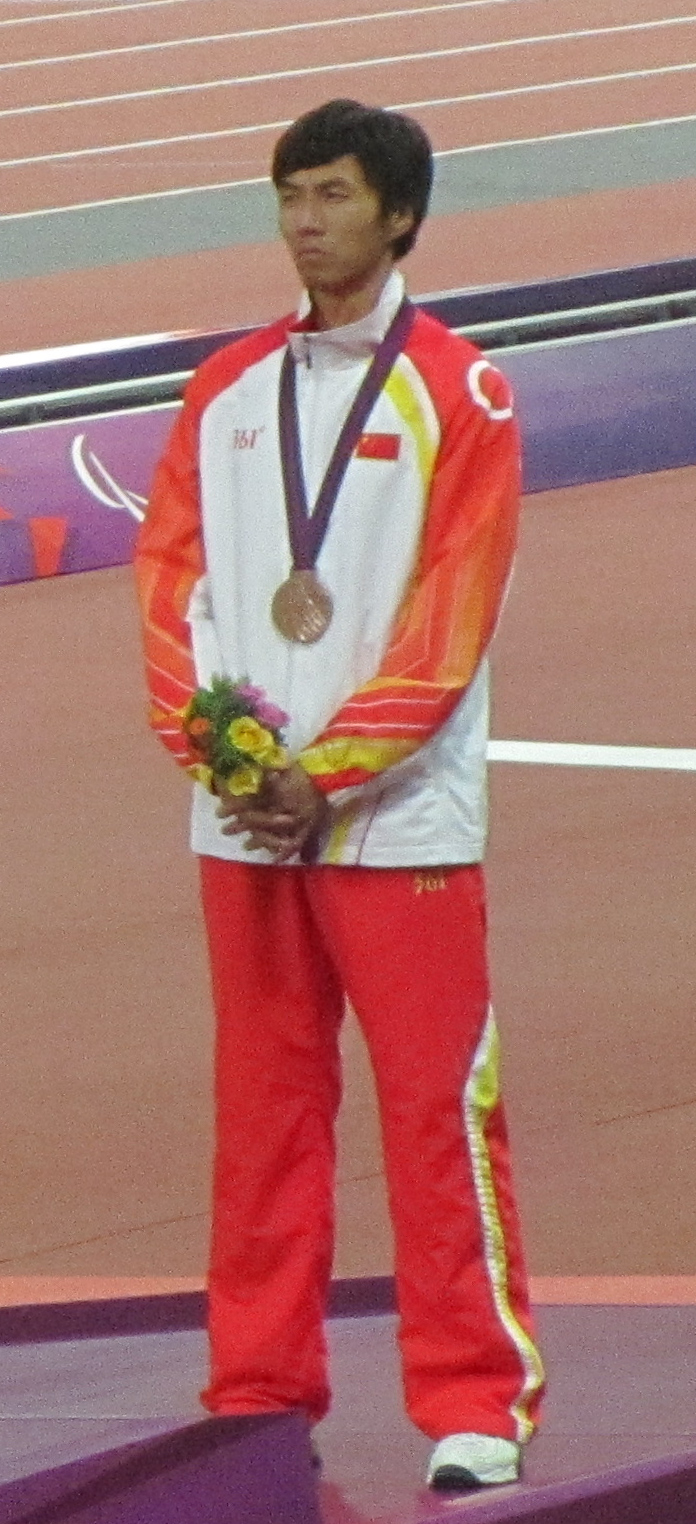
- Li at the 2012 Paralympics

Personal information
- Born: 1982 (age 43–44)

Sport
- Sport: Paralympic athletics
- Disability class: T12
- Event: Sprint
Medal record
Representing China
Paralympic Games
Gold medal – first place	2004 Athens	4 × 100 m T11–13
Silver medal – second place	2004 Athens	400 m T12
Gold medal – first place	2008 Beijing	4 × 100 m T11–13
Silver medal – second place	2008 Beijing	200 m T12
Silver medal – second place	2012 London	4 × 100 m T11–13
Bronze medal – third place	2012 London	100 m T12
Bronze medal – third place	2012 London	200 m T12
Asian Para Games
Gold medal – first place	2010 Guangzhou	100 m T12
Gold medal – first place	2010 Guangzhou	400 m T12
Silver medal – second place	2010 Guangzhou	4 × 100 m T11–13
IPC Athletics World Championships
Silver medal – second place	2002 Lille	4 × 400 m T11–13
Bronze medal – third place	2002 Lille	400 m T12
Gold medal – first place	2006 Assen	200 m T12
Gold medal – first place	2006 Assen	400 m T12

Li Yansong (Chinese: 李岩松; pinyin: Lǐ Yánsōng, born c. 1982) is a visually impaired sprinter from China. He competed at the 2004, 2008 and 2012 Paralympics and won seven medals, including two gold medals in the 4 × 100 m relay.

Li is married and has one daughter. He has a degree in sport studies from Beijing Sports Institute. He began losing his eyesight around the age of 18.
