= Li Qiang (athlete) =

Chinese Paralympic athlete

Medal record

Paralympic athletics

Representing China

Paralympic Games
Gold medal – first place	2000 Sydney	100 metres - T12
Gold medal – first place	2000 Sydney	400 metres - T12
Gold medal – first place	2004 Athens	4x100 metre relay - T11-13
Gold medal – first place	2008 Beijing	4x100 metre relay - T11-13
Silver medal – second place	2000 Sydney	200 metres - T12

Li Qiang is a paralympic athlete from China competing mainly in category T12 sprint events.

Li was the star of the T12 sprint events in Sydney during the 2000 Summer Paralympics winning gold in both the 100m and 200m and silver in the 400 m. In the following two Paralympics, Li failed to win any more individual medals despite competing in the same three events in each, he did however win gold as part of the Chinese 4 × 100 m relay team in both the 2004 and 2008 Summer Paralympics.
