= Athletics at the 2004 Summer Paralympics – Men's long jump F42–46 =

Men's long jump events for amputee athletes were held at the 2004 Summer Paralympics in the Athens Olympic Stadium. Events were held in three disability classes.

== F42 ==
Men's Long Jump F42 at the XII Paralympic Games
- Venue: Athens Olympic Stadium
- Dates: 27 September 2004
- Competitors: 8 from 7 nations
- Winning distance: 6.23

Medalists
1st place, gold medalist(s)		Wojtek Czyz	Germany
2nd place, silver medalist(s)		Stefano Lippi	Italy
3rd place, bronze medalist(s)		Heinrich Popow	Germany

The F42 event was won by Wojtek Czyz, representing Germany.

27 Sept. 2004, 20:45

Rank	Athlete	Result	Notes
1st place, gold medalist(s)	Wojtek Czyz (GER)	6.23	WR
2nd place, silver medalist(s)	Stefano Lippi (ITA)	5.63	
3rd place, bronze medalist(s)	Heinrich Popow (GER)	5.43	
4	Kenji Kotani (JPN)	5.25	
5	Hristo Gerganski (BUL)	4.58	
6	Ruben Fuentes (MEX)	4.23	
7	Muhammad Ashfaq (PAK)	3.62	
	Guo Wei Zhong (CHN)	DNS	

== F44 ==
Men's Long Jump F44 at the XII Paralympic Games
- Venue: Athens Olympic Stadium
- Dates: 25 September 2004
- Competitors: 10 from 6 nations
- Winning distance: 6.68

Medalists
1st place, gold medalist(s)		Urs Kolly	Switzerland
2nd place, silver medalist(s)		Roberto la Barbera	Italy
3rd place, bronze medalist(s)		Marlon Shirley	United States

The F44 event was won by Urs Kolly, representing Switzerland.

25 Sept. 2004, 21:15

Rank	Athlete	Result	Notes
1st place, gold medalist(s)	Urs Kolly (SUI)	6.68	PR
2nd place, silver medalist(s)	Roberto La Barbera (ITA)	6.45	
3rd place, bronze medalist(s)	Marlon Shirley (USA)	6.20	
4	Wang Qiu Hong (CHN)	6.10	
5	Xavier le Draoullec (FRA)	5.79	
6	Daniele Bonacini (ITA)	5.72	
7	Philippe Ramon (FRA)	5.04	
8	Muhammad Adeel (PAK)	4.19	
9	Noor Alam (PAK)	3.89	
	Roderick Green (USA)	DNS	

== F46 ==
Men's Long Jump F46 at the XII Paralympic Games
- Venue: Athens Olympic Stadium
- Dates: 22 September 2004
- Competitors: 14 from 11 nations
- Winning distance: 7.16

Medalists
1st place, gold medalist(s)		Anton Skachkov	Ukraine
2nd place, silver medalist(s)		Mohammed Dif	Morocco
3rd place, bronze medalist(s)		Arnaud Assoumani	France

The F46 event was won by Anton Skachkov, representing Ukraine.

22 Sept. 2004, 19:00

Rank	Athlete	Result	Notes
1st place, gold medalist(s)	Anton Skachkov (UKR)	7.16	WR
2nd place, silver medalist(s)	Mohammed Dif (MAR)	7.07	
3rd place, bronze medalist(s)	Arnaud Assoumani (FRA)	6.91	
4	David Roos (RSA)	6.57	
5	Li Kang Yong (CHN)	6.53	
6	Zhang Hong Wei (CHN)	6.38	
7	Aliaksandr Subota (BLR)	6.37	
8	Yogev Kenzi (ISR)	6.11	
9	Reinhold Boetzel (GER)	5.89	
10	Munawar Hussain (PAK)	5.60	
11	Rajarathinam Subbaiah (IND)	5.40	
12	Shafique Muhammad (PAK)	4.73	
13	Abdul Majed Sileah (IRQ)	4.43	
	Jiao Xingquan (CHN)		NMR
