= Athletics at the 2004 Summer Paralympics – Men's triple jump F46 =

Men's Triple Jump F46 at the XII Paralympic Games
- Venue: Athens Olympic Stadium
- Dates: 24 September 2004
- Competitors: 11 from 8 nations
- Winning distance: 14.12

Medalists
1st place, gold medalist(s)		Anton Skachkov	Ukraine
2nd place, silver medalist(s)		Mai Wen Jie	China
3rd place, bronze medalist(s)		Zhang Hong Wei	China

The Men's triple jump F46 event for amputee athletes was held at the 2004 Summer Paralympics in the Athens Olympic Stadium. It was won by Anton Skachkov, representing Ukraine.

24 Sept. 2004, 19:00

Rank	Athlete	Result	Notes
1st place, gold medalist(s)	Anton Skachkov (UKR)	14.12	
2nd place, silver medalist(s)	Mai Wen Jie (CHN)	14.03	
3rd place, bronze medalist(s)	Zhang Hong Wei (CHN)	13.92	
4	Jiao Xingquan (CHN)	13.73	
5	Yaghoub Pagheh (IRI)	13.46	
6	Aliaksandr Subota (BLR)	DNF	
7	Arnaud Assoumani (FRA)	12.84	
8	Georgios Toptsis (GRE)	12.41	
9	Devendra Jhajharia (IND)	12.03	
10	Tsung Wei Arfaoui (TUN)	11.66	
	Rajarathinam Subbaiah (IND)	DNS	
