= Athletics at the 2004 Summer Paralympics – Men's pentathlon P54–58 =

Men's Pentathlon P54-58 at the XII Paralympic Games
- Venue: Athens Olympic Stadium
- Dates: 20 September 2004
- Competitors: 11 from 8 nations
- Winning points: 5806

Medalists
| 1st place, gold medalist(s) | | Ling Yong | China |
| 2nd place, silver medalist(s) | | Pieter Gruijters | Netherlands |
| 3rd place, bronze medalist(s) | | Rene Nielsen | Denmark |

The Men's pentathlon P54-58 event for wheelchair athletes at the 2004 Summer Paralympics was held in the Athens Olympic Stadium on 20 September. It was won by Ling Yong, representing China.

Schedule
| Shot Put | 08:30 |
| Javelin | 10:30 |
| 200 metres | 13:00 |
| Discus | 17:00 |
| 1500 metres | 21:05 |

| Rank | Athlete | Points | Notes |
|---|---|---|---|
| 1st place, gold medalist(s) | Ling Yong (CHN) | 5806 | WR |
| 2nd place, silver medalist(s) | Pieter Gruijters (NED) | 5655 | |
| 3rd place, bronze medalist(s) | Rene Nielsen (DEN) | 5495 | |
| 4 | Ali Ghribi (TUN) | 5424 | |
| 5 | Alexei Ivanov (RUS) | 5306 | |
| 6 | Liu Wei (CHN) | 5109 | |
| 7 | Tahar Lachheb (TUN) | 5009 | |
| 8 | Nezar Mohammad (KUW) | 4954 | |
| 9 | Baraket Ltaief (TUN) | 4840 | |
| 10 | Richard Nicholson (AUS) | 4662 | |
| 11 | Reinhard Berner (GER) | 4156 | |
