= Athletics at the 2004 Summer Paralympics – Men's 4 × 400 metre relay T35–T38 =

Men's 4x400m T35-38 at the XII Paralympic Games
- Venue: Athens Olympic Stadium
- Dates: 27 September 2004
- Competitors: 5
- Winning time: 3:38.92

Medalists
1st place, gold medalist(s)		Abbes Saidi; Mohamed Charmi; Fares Hamdi; Mohamed Farhat Chida	Tunisia
2nd place, silver medalist(s)		Yang Chen; Lu Yi; Zhou Wenjun; Che Mian	China
3rd place, bronze medalist(s)		Oleksandr Driha; Serhiy Norenko; Andriy Onufriyenko; Andriy Zhyltsov	Ukraine

The Men's 4 × 400 m relay T35-38 for athletes with cerebral palsy at the 2004 Summer Paralympics was held in the Athens Olympic Stadium on 27 September. The event consisted of a single race, and was won by the team representing Tunisia.

== Final round ==
27 Sept. 2004, 11:25

Rank	Team	Time	Notes
1st place, gold medalist(s)	Tunisia	3:38.92	WR
2nd place, silver medalist(s)	China	3:40.62	
3rd place, bronze medalist(s)	Ukraine	3:46.78	
4	Spain	3:59.71	
	Australia	DNF	

== Team Lists ==
Tunisia; Abbes Saidi; Mohamed Charmi; Fares Hamdi; Mohamed Farhat Chida	China; Yang Chen; Lu Yi; Zhou Wenjun; Che Mian	Ukraine; Oleksandr Driha; Serhiy Norenko; Andriy Onufriyenko; Andriy Zhyltsov	Spain; Juan Ramon Carrapiso; Jose M. Pampano; Iván Hompanera; Jose Manuel Gonzalez
Australia; Paul Benz; Darren Thrupp; Benjamin Hall; Tim Sullivan
