= Athletics at the 2004 Summer Paralympics – Men's triple jump F11–12 =

Men's triple jump events for blind & visually impaired athletes were held at the 2004 Summer Paralympics in the Athens Olympic Stadium. Events were held in two disability classes.

== F11 ==
Men's Triple Jump F11 at the XII Paralympic Games
- Venue: Athens Olympic Stadium
- Dates: 26 September 2004
- Competitors: 8 from 7 nations
- Winning distance: 13.10

Medalists
1st place, gold medalist(s)		Li Duan	China
2nd place, silver medalist(s)		Zeynidin Bilalov	Azerbaijan
3rd place, bronze medalist(s)		Sergey Sevostianov	Russia

The F11 event was won by Li Duan, representing China.

26 Sept. 2004, 20:30

Rank	Athlete	Result	Notes
1st place, gold medalist(s)	Li Duan (CHN)	13.10	PR
2nd place, silver medalist(s)	Zeynidin Bilalov (AZE)	12.88	
3rd place, bronze medalist(s)	Sergey Sevostianov (RUS)	12.63	
4	Jorge Jay Maso (CUB)	12.51	
5	Dimitrios Alexiou (GRE)	12.35	
6	José Manuel Rodríguez (ESP)	12.22	
7	Viktar Zhukouski (BLR)	11.90	
8	Athanasios Barakas (GRE)	11.39	

== F12 ==
Men's Triple Jump F12 at the XII Paralympic Games
- Venue: Athens Olympic Stadium
- Dates: 27 September 2004
- Competitors: 9 from 6 nations
- Winning distance: 15.30

Medalists
1st place, gold medalist(s)		Duan Qifeng	China
2nd place, silver medalist(s)		Aliaksandr Kuzmichou	Belarus
3rd place, bronze medalist(s)		Ivan Kytsenko	Ukraine

The F12 event was won by Duan Qifeng, representing China.

27 Sept. 2004, 09:00

Rank	Athlete	Result	Notes
1st place, gold medalist(s)	Duan Qifeng (CHN)	15.30	WR
2nd place, silver medalist(s)	Aliaksandr Kuzmichou (BLR)	14.59	
3rd place, bronze medalist(s)	Ivan Kytsenko (UKR)	14.45	
4	Enrique Cepeda (CUB)	14.39	
5	Ruslan Sivitski (BLR)	14.38	
6	Juan Viedma (ESP)	13.90	
7	Igor Gorbenko (UKR)	13.66	
8	Fernando Gonzalez (CUB)	13.14	
	Stéphane Bozzolo (FRA)	DNS	
