= China at the 2004 Summer Paralympics =

- IPC code: CHN
- NPC: China Administration of Sports for Persons with Disabilities
- Website: www.caspd.org.cn

in Athens
- Competitors: 200 in 11 sports
- Medals Ranked 1st: Gold 63 Silver 46 Bronze 32 Total 141

Summer Paralympics appearances (overview)
- 1984; 1988; 1992; 1996; 2000; 2004; 2008; 2012; 2016; 2020; 2024

China competed at the 2004 Summer Paralympics, held in Athens, Greece. China topped the medal table for the first time, becoming the first Asian country to top the medal count with more gold medals, more silver medals, and more medals overall than any other nation. This was an improvement from its previous best performance, where they had ranked sixth on the medal tally at the 2000 Summer Paralympics. China also broke the record for the most gold medals, the most silvers medals, the most bronze medals and the most medal overall won by Asian countries at a single Summer Paralympics, which was previously set by South Korea in 1988 with 40 gold, 35 silver and 19 bronze.

== Medallists ==
Medal	Name	Sport	Event
Gold	Yanhong Wang	Archery	Women's ST
Gold	Yang Chen	Athletics	Men's 100m T37
Gold	Qifeng Duan; Li Yansong; Li Qiang; Xiang Wu	Athletics	Men's 4 × 100 m relay T11-13
Gold	Bin Hou	Athletics	Men's high jump F42
Gold	Yancong Wu	Athletics	Men's high jump F44/46
Gold	Li Duan	Athletics	Men's long jump F11
Gold	Guo Wei	Athletics	Men's long jump F36-38
Gold	Li Duan	Athletics	Men's triple jump F11
Gold	Qifeng Duan	Athletics	Men's triple jump F12
Gold	Hai Tao Sun	Athletics	Men's shot put F13
Gold	Guo Wei	Athletics	Men's shot put F35
Gold	Hai Tao Sun	Athletics	Men's discus F12
Gold	Feng Yan	Athletics	Men's discus F35
Gold	Fan Liang	Athletics	Men's discus F54
Gold	Yong Gang Chen	Athletics	Men's discus F58
Gold	Guo Wei	Athletics	Men's javelin F35
Gold	Yong Ling	Athletics	Men's pentathlon P54-58
Gold	Wang Fang	Athletics	Women's 100m T36
Gold	Chun Miao Wu	Athletics	Women's 200m T11
Gold	Wang Fang	Athletics	Women's 200m T36
Gold	Hai Yuan Zhang	Athletics	Women's long jump F42
Gold	Zheng Baozhu	Athletics	Women's shot put F42-46
Gold	Hong Yan Xu	Athletics	Women's discus F13
Gold	Chun Hua Li	Athletics	Women's discus F37
Gold	Zheng Baozhu	Athletics	Women's discus F42-46
Gold	Wang Ting	Athletics	Women's discus F54/55
Gold	Ju Fang Zhou	Cycling	Women's bicycle 1 km time trial LC 1-4&CP3/4
Gold	Yun Feng Wang	Judo	Men's -73 kg
Gold	Lan Mei Xue	Judo	Women's +70 kg
Gold	Jian Wang	Powerlifting	Men's -56 kg
Gold	Hai Dong Zhang	Powerlifting	Men's -75 kg
Gold	Jian Xin Bian	Powerlifting	Women's -48 kg
Gold	Taoying Fu	Powerlifting	Women's -60 kg
Gold	Rui Fang Li	Powerlifting	Women's +82.5 kg
Gold	Jian Fei Li	Shooting	Men's air pistol SH1
Gold	Jian Ping Du	Swimming	Men's 50m backstroke S3
Gold	Junquan He	Swimming	Men's 50m backstroke S5
Gold	Junquan He	Swimming	Men's 50m butterfly S5
Gold	Peng Li	Swimming	Men's 50m butterfly S6
Gold	Rong Tian	Swimming	Men's 50m butterfly S7
Gold	Xiao Fu Wang	Swimming	Men's 100m butterfly S8
Gold	Jianhua Yin	Swimming	Men's 50m freestyle S6
Gold	Xiao Fu Wang	Swimming	Men's 50m freestyle S8
Gold	Xiao Ming Xiong	Swimming	Men's 50m freestyle S9
Gold	Jianhua Yin	Swimming	Men's 100m freestyle S6
Gold	Jian Ping Du	Swimming	Men's 150m individual medley SM3
Gold	Junquan He	Swimming	Men's 200m individual medley SM5
Gold	Xiao Fu Wang	Swimming	Men's 200m individual medley SM8
Gold	Jian Ping Du; Yuan Tang; Junquan He; Jianhua Yin	Swimming	Men's 4x50m freestyle relay 20pts
Gold	Hong Yan Zhu	Swimming	Women's 50m freestyle S12
Gold	Qiming Dong	Swimming	Women's 100m backstroke S11
Gold	Hong Yan Zhu	Swimming	Women's 100m backstroke S12
Gold	Hong Yan Zhu	Swimming	Women's 100m freestyle S12
Gold	Hong Yan Zhu	Swimming	Women's 200m individual medley SM12
Gold	Zhang Yan	Table tennis	Men's singles 4
Gold	Xiaolei Lu; Yang Ge	Table tennis	Men's teams 10
Gold	Gui Xiang Ren	Table tennis	Women's singles 5
Gold	Xiaoling Zhang	Table tennis	Women's singles 6-8
Gold	Meili Liu	Table tennis	Women's singles 9
Gold	Gai Gu; Gui Xiang Ren; Wei Hong Chen	Table tennis	Women's teams 4-5
Gold	Lina Lei; Yu Qian Li; Xiaoling Zhang; Mei Li Liu	Table tennis	Women's team 6-10
Gold	Chen Yu Ping; Sheng Yu Hong; Yang Yan Ling; Xue Jun; Zhang Xu Fei; Li Li Ping; Zhao Jin Qiu; Zheng Xiong Ying; Gong Bin; Tan Yanhua; Lu Hong Qin	Volleyball	Women's team
Gold	Dao Liang Hu; Zhang Chong; Lei Zhang	Wheelchair fencing	Men's foil team open
Silver	Zhou Wenjun	Athletics	Men's 100m T38
Silver	Yang Chen	Athletics	Men's 200m T37
Silver	Li Yansong	Athletics	Men's 400m T12
Silver	Yang Chen	Athletics	Men's 400m T37
Silver	Zhou Wenjun; Yang Chen; Lü Yi; Mian Che	Athletics	Men's 4 × 100 m relay T35-38
Silver	Yang Chen; Lü Yi; Zhou Wenjun; Mian Che	Athletics	Men's 4 × 400 m relay T35-38
Silver	Wei Zhong Guo	Athletics	Men's high jump F42
Silver	Xin Han Fu	Athletics	Men's long jump F36-38
Silver	Wen Jie Mai	Athletics	Men's triple jump F46
Silver	Xin Han Fu	Athletics	Men's discus F35
Silver	Zheng Weihai	Athletics	Men's discus F57
Silver	Bo Quan Zhou	Athletics	Men's javelin F13
Silver	Ming Jie Gao	Athletics	Men's javelin F44/46
Silver	Chun Miao Wu	Athletics	Women's 100m T11
Silver	Wang Fang	Athletics	Women's 400m T38
Silver	Wang Juan	Athletics	Women's long jump F44/46
Silver	Hong Yan Xu	Athletics	Women's shot put F12
Silver	Ling Li	Athletics	Women's shot put F56-58
Silver	Xu Hong Bai	Athletics	Women's discus F35/36/38
Silver	Ling Li	Athletics	Women's discus F56-58
Silver	Feng Zhen An	Cycling	Women's bicycle 1 km time trial LC1-4&CP3/4
Silver	Run Ming Men	Judo	Men's -100 kg
Silver	Guo Jing Wu	Powerlifting	Men's -52 kg
Silver	Mao Shun Wu	Powerlifting	Men's -67.5 kg
Silver	Li Ping Zhang	Powerlifting	Women's -67.5 kg
Silver	Mingxia Zhu	Powerlifting	Women's -75 kg
Silver	Mang Pei	Swimming	Men's 50m butterfly S7
Silver	Jian Ping Du	Swimming	Men's 50m freestyle S3
Silver	Renjie Wang	Swimming	Men's 50m freestyle S9
Silver	Yuan Tang	Swimming	Men's 100m backstroke S6
Silver	Baoren Gong	Swimming	Men's 100m breaststroke SB7
Silver	Jian Ping Du	Swimming	Men's 100m freestyle S3
Silver	Yuan Tang	Swimming	Men's 100m freestyle S6
Silver	Xiao Ming Xiong	Swimming	Men's 100m freestyle S9
Silver	Jian Ping Du	Swimming	Men's 200m freestyle S3
Silver	Yuan Run Yang	Swimming	Men's 200m individual medley SM6
Silver	Yuan Tang	Swimming	Men's 400m freestyle S6
Silver	Rong Tian	Swimming	Men's 400m freestyle S7
Silver	Renjie Wang; Ke Qiang Li; Xiao Fu Wang; Xiao Ming Xiong	Swimming	Men's 4 × 100 m medley relay 34pts
Silver	Min Huang	Swimming	Women's 50m butterfly S7
Silver	Hong Yan Zhu	Swimming	Women's 100m butterfly S12
Silver	Min Huang	Swimming	Women's 200m individual medley SM7
Silver	Xiao Lei Lu	Table tennis	Men's singles 9
Silver	Wei Hong Chen	Table tennis	Women's singles 5
Silver	Lina Lei	Table tennis	Women's singles 9
Silver	Lei Zhang	Wheelchair fencing	Men's foil individual A
Bronze	Li Weichun	Athletics	Men's 100m T35
Bronze	Mian Che	Athletics	Men's 100m T36
Bronze	Zhou Wenjun	Athletics	Men's 200m T38
Bronze	Wu Faqi	Athletics	Men's 400m T46
Bronze	Cheng En He	Athletics	Men's 1500m T36
Bronze	Qiu Hong Wang	Athletics	Men's high jump F44/46
Bronze	Qifeng Duan	Athletics	Men's long jump F12
Bronze	Hong Wei Zhang	Athletics	Men's triple jump F46
Bronze	Si Lao Ha	Athletics	Men's discus F44/46
Bronze	Dai Chen Wang	Athletics	Men's javelin F44/46
Bronze	Ying Bin Zhang	Athletics	Men's javelin F55/56
Bronze	Li Peng Chen	Athletics	Women's discus F54/55
Bronze	Li Peng Chen	Athletics	Women's javelin F54/55
Bronze	Qi Tang	Cycling	Women's bicycle 1 km time trial LC 1-4&CP3/4
Bronze	Zhi Lin Xu	Judo	Men's -66 kg
Bronze	Qiu Lian Wang	Judo	Women's -52 kg
Bronze	Jian Yu	Powerlifting	Men's -60 kg
Bronze	Ya Dong Wu	Powerlifting	Men's -90 kg
Bronze	Li Bing	Powerlifting	Men's -100 kg
Bronze	Cui Juan Xiao	Powerlifting	Women's -44 kg
Bronze	Yan Yang	Powerlifting	Women's -52 kg
Bronze	Zhenling Huo	Powerlifting	Women's -56 kg
Bronze	Hua Bin Zeng	Swimming	Men's 50m backstroke S4
Bronze	Bin Wu	Swimming	Men's 50m freestyle S12
Bronze	Peng Li	Swimming	Men's 100m breaststroke SB7
Bronze	Ke Qiang Li	Swimming	Men's 100m breaststroke SB8
Bronze	Renjie Wang; Xiao Fu Wang; Jianhua Yin; Xiao Ming Xiong	Swimming	Men's 4 × 100 m freestyle relay 34pts
Bronze	Min Huang	Swimming	Women's 100m breaststroke SB7
Bronze	Yang Ge	Table tennis	Men's singles 10
Bronze	Zhang Jie; Zhang Yan	Table tennis	Men's team 4
Bronze	Yu Qiang Li	Table tennis	Women's singles 10
Bronze	Dao Liang Hu; Zhang Chong; Lei Zhang	Wheelchair fencing	Men's épée team open

== Athletes ==
Bold athletes are athletes who have won one medal.

=== Archery ===
==== Men ====
Athlete	Event	Ranking round		Round of 32	Round of 16	Quarterfinals	Semifinals	Finals	
Athlete	Event	Score	Seed	Opposition score	Opposition score	Opposition score	Opposition score	Opposition score	Rank
Zhang Nan	Ind. W2	615	8	Bulyk (POL); W 159-148	Vitale (ITA); W 158-139	Lee Hong Gu (KOR); L 92-97	did not advance		
Zhu Weiliang	Ind. standing	575	16	Gobbato (FRA); W 143-136	Young (KOR); W 155-154	Baatarjav (MGL); W 97-93	Lezanski (POL); L 97-88	did not advance	

==== Women ====
Athlete	Event	Ranking round		Round of 32	Round of 16	Quarterfinals	Semifinals	Finals	
Athlete	Event	Score	Seed	Opposition score	Opposition score	Opposition score	Opposition score	Opposition score	Rank
Yanhong Wang	Ind. recurve Standing	603	2	Bye	Cordowiner (AUS); W 136-126	Tzika (GRE); W 101-91	Olejnik (POL); W 98-80	Karpmaichan (THA); W 92-83	1st place, gold medalist(s)

=== Athletics ===
==== Men's track events ====
Athlete	Class	Event	Heats		Semifinal		Final	
Athlete	Class	Event	Result	Rank	Result	Rank	Result	Rank
Che Mian	T35	100m	12.78	3Q	—N/a		12.60	3rd place, bronze medalist(s)
Cheng En He	T37	800m	2:26.17	6	—N/a		did not advance	
Cheng En He	T37	1500m	—N/a				4:40.32	3rd place, bronze medalist(s)
Huang Zhian	T54	400m	1:41.83	6	—N/a		did not advance	
Li Jun	T54	100m	15.12	3q	14.91	6	did not advance	
Li Qiang	T12	100m	11.21	1Q	11.25	2	11.31	5
Li Qiang	T12	200m	22.96	2q	22.73	2	did not advance	
Li Weichun	T35	100m	13.38	1Q	—N/a		13.38	3rd place, bronze medalist(s)
Li Yansong	T12	100m	11.32	1Q	11.24	3	did not advance	
Li Yansong	T12	400m	50.29	1Q	51.99	1Q	49.20	2nd place, silver medalist(s)
Qi Shun	T13	1500m	4:14.04	8	—N/a		did not advance	
Qi Shun	T12	5000m	—N/a				16:13.85	10
Qi Shun	T11	10000m	—N/a				DNF	
Qi Shun	T11	Marathon	—N/a				DNF	
Wei Yuan Bang	T46	1500m	—N/a				4:07.63	7
Wei Yuan Bang	T46	5000m	—N/a				16:02.38	15
Wu Faqi	T46	400m	52.49	4q	—N/a		49.53	3rd place, bronze medalist(s)
Wu Xiang	T11	100m	11.99	1Q	11.94	3	did not advance	
Wu Xiang	T11	200m	24.11	2q	24.19	3	did not advance	
Xie Zhao Xing	T44	100m	12.54	7	—N/a		did not advance	
Xu Xiaocheng	T13	100m	11.66	6	—N/a		did not advance	
Yang Chen	T37	100m	12.28	1Q	—N/a		12.23	1st place, gold medalist(s)
Yang Chen	T37	200m	25.36	3Q	—N/a		24.85	2nd place, silver medalist(s)
Yang Chen	T37	400m	N/A				54.60	2nd place, silver medalist(s)
Zhang Li Xin	T54	100m	14.94	3q	15.16	6	did not advance	
Zhang Zhen	T11	5000m	—N/a				DNF	
Zhang Zhen	T11	10000m	—N/a				DNF	
Zhang Zhen	T11	Marathon	—N/a				DNF	
Zhou Wenjun	T38	100m	11.75	1Q	—N/a		11.63	2nd place, silver medalist(s)
Zhou Wenjun	T38	200m	23.74	1Q	—N/a		23.47	3rd place, bronze medalist(s)
Zhou Wenjun	T38	400m	54.58	5	did not advance			
Wu Xiang; Li Qiang; Li Yansong; Qifeng Duan	T11-13	4 × 100 m relay	43.60 WR	1	—N/a		43.13 WR	1st place, gold medalist(s)
Zhou Wenjun; Yang Chen; Lu Yi; Che Mian	T35 - 38	4 × 100 m relay	—N/a				46.86	2nd place, silver medalist(s)
Zhou Wenjun; Yang Chen; Lu Yi; Che Mian	T35 - 38	4 × 400 m relay	—N/a				3:40.62	2nd place, silver medalist(s)
Xie Zhao Xing; Mai Wen Jie; Wu Faqi; Zhang Hong Wei	T42-46	4 × 100 m relay	—N/a				DNS	
Xie Zhao Xing; Wei Yuan Bang; Wang Qiu Hong; Wu Faqi	T42-46	4 × 400 m relay	—N/a				3:50.42	4
Liu Wei; Zhao Ji; Zhang Li Xin; Li Jun	T53-54	4 × 100 m relay	—N/a				DNS	
Liu Wei; Zhao Ji; Zhang Li Xin; Li Jun	T53-54	4 × 400 m relay	DSQ		—N/a		did not advance	

==== Men's field events ====
Athlete	Class	Event	Final		
Athlete	Class	Event	Result	Points	Rank
Bin Hou	F46	High jump	1.77	-	1st place, gold medalist(s)
Bo Quan Zhou	F13	Javelin	56.54	-	2nd place, silver medalist(s)
Bo Quan Zhou	F13	Discus	35.77	-	5
Dai Chen Wang	F44/46	Javelin	55.54	1033	3rd place, bronze medalist(s)
Fan Liang	F54	Discus	28.93	-	1st place, gold medalist(s)
Fan Liang	F54	Shot put	7.08	-	10
Fen Yang	F35	Discus	43.33	-	1st place, gold medalist(s)
Fen Yang	F35	Shot put	10.98	-	6
Fen Yang	F35	Javelin	27.17	-	8
Guo Wei	F35	Javelin	46.06 WR	-	1st place, gold medalist(s)
Guo Wei	F35	Shot put	14.20	-	1st place, gold medalist(s)
Guo Wei	F36-38	Long jump	6.06 WR	1196	1st place, gold medalist(s)
Guo Wei Zhong	F42	Long jump	DNS		
Hai Tao Sun	F13	Discus	52.51 WR	-	1st place, gold medalist(s)
Hai Tao Sun	F13	Shot put	16.62 WR	-	1st place, gold medalist(s)
Hai Tao Sun	F13	Javelin	DNF		
Hong Wei Zhang	F46	Triple jump	13.92	-	3rd place, bronze medalist(s)
Hua Yan Gang	F12	Javelin	50.12	-	5
Ji Jianguo	F57	Discus	40.68	-	6
Ji Jianguo	F57	Javelin	36.40	-	5
Jiao Xingquan	F46	Long jump	NMR		
Jiao Xingquan	F46	Triple jump	13.73	-	4
Li Duan	F11	Long jump	6.40	-	1st place, gold medalist(s)
Li Duan	F11	Triple jump	13.10	-	1st place, gold medalist(s)
Li Duan	F11	Javelin	39.82	-	4
Li Kang Yong	F46	Long jump	6.53	-	5
Li Weichun	F35	Javelin	38.82	-	5
Ling Yong	P54-58	Pentathlon	5806		1st place, gold medalist(s)
Liu Wei	P54-58	Pentathlon	5109		6
Ming Jie Gao	F44/46	Javelin	55.57	1033	2nd place, silver medalist(s)
Qifeng Duan	F12	Long jump	7.00	-	3rd place, bronze medalist(s)
Qifeng Duan	F12	Triple jump	15.30 WR	-	1st place, gold medalist(s)
Qiu De Lun	F58	Discus	42.63	-	9
Qiu De Lun	F58	Shot put	10.33	-	10
Si Lao Ha	F44/46	Discus	47.32	946	3rd place, bronze medalist(s)
Si Lao Ha	F44/46	Javelin	52.29	972	5
Si Lao Ha	F44/46	Shot put	11.71	806	13
Wang Qiu Hong	F44	Long jump	6.10	-	4
Wang Zhi Quan	F57	Javelin	34.95	-	6
Wei Zhong Guo	F42	High jump	1.74	-	2nd place, silver medalist(s)
Wei Zhang Hong	F46	Long jump	6.38	-	6
Wen Jie Mai	F46	Triple jump	14.03	-	2nd place, silver medalist(s)
Wu Wei	F57	Discus	32.49	-	8
Wu Wei	F57	Shot put	8.21	-	10
Xie Zhao Xing	F44/46	High jump	1.91	-	4
Xin Han Fu	F36-38	Long jump	5.58	1102	2nd place, silver medalist(s)
Xin Han Fu	F35	Discus	41.61	-	2nd place, silver medalist(s)
Xin Han Fu	F35	Shot put	12.63	-	4
Xiu Gong Feng	F44/46	Shot put	14.31	914	7
Xu Xiaocheng	F13	Long jump	6.41	-	4
Yancong Wu	F44/46	High jump	1.97 =WR	-	1st place, gold medalist(s)
Ying Bin Zhang	F55-56	Javelin	32.65	1117	3rd place, bronze medalist(s)
Yong Gang Chen	F58	Discus	52.73	-	1st place, gold medalist(s)
Yong Gang Chen	F58	Shot put	13.47	-	6
Zheng Weihai	F57	Discus	46.42	-	2nd place, silver medalist(s)
Zheng Weihai	F57	Javelin	27.06	-	8
Zheng Weihai	F57	Shot put	12.07	-	4

==== Women's track events ====
Athlete	Class	Event	Heats		Semifinal		Final	
Athlete	Class	Event	Result	Rank	Result	Rank	Result	Rank
Chun Mao Wu	T11	100m	12.98	2Q	13.20	2q	12.94	2nd place, silver medalist(s)
Chun Mao Wu	T11	200m	26.87	1Q	26.59	1Q	25.39	1st place, gold medalist(s)
Liu Miao Miao	T12	100m	13.76	1Q	13.71	4	did not advance	
Liu Miao Miao	T12	200m	28.25	2	did not advance			
Sai Ning Li	T46	200m	26.93	4q	—N/a		27.03	6
Sun Xin	T12	100m	14.41	3	did not advance			
Sun Xin	T12	200m	29.68	3	did not advance			
Wang Fang	T36	100m	—N/a				13.88 WR	1st place, gold medalist(s)
Wang Fang	T36	200m	—N/a				28.60 WR	1st place, gold medalist(s)
Wang Fang	T36	400m	—N/a				1:06.96	2nd place, silver medalist(s)
Wang Juan	T44/46	100m	14.06	9	—N/a		did not advance	
Wen Qing	T54	100m	17.41	3Q	—N/a		17.52	6
Wen Qing	T54	200m	31.83	3	—N/a		did not advance	
Wu Chun Miao	T12	400m	DNS		did not advance			
Wu Jing	T11	100m	13.82	3q	18.32	3	15.43	6
Wu Jing	T11	200m	DNS		did not advance			
Yang Bing	T12	100m	14.11	3	did not advance			
Yang Bing	T12	200m	29.39	4	did not advance			
Yang Ou Jing Ling	T46	100m	13.31	5q	—N/a		13.30	8
Yang Ou Jing Ling	T46	200m	26.92	2Q	—N/a		27.03	5

==== Women's field events ====
Athlete	Class	Event	Final		
Athlete	Class	Event	Result	Points	Rank
Chen Fang	F56-58	Discus	30.88	995	8
Chen Fang	F56-58	Javelin	13.17	527	13
Chen Fang	F56-58	Shot put	8.44	922	11
Chun Hua Li	F37	Discus	28.20 WR	700	1st place, gold medalist(s)
Chun Hua Li	F37	Shot put	8.24	894	9
Hai Yuan Zhang	F42	Long jump	3.67 WR	-	1st place, gold medalist(s)
Hong Yan Xu	F12	Shot put	12.35	-	2nd place, silver medalist(s)
Hong Yan Xu	F13	Discus	44.56	-	1st place, gold medalist(s)
Li Ping Chen	F54/55	Discus	15.91	1054	3rd place, bronze medalist(s)
Li Ping Chen	F54/55	Javelin	12.35	958	3rd place, bronze medalist(s)
Li Ping Chen	F54/55	Shot put	4.81	791	12
Ling Li	F56-58	Discus	24.95	1054	2nd place, silver medalist(s)
Ling Li	F56-58	Javelin	17.85	863	8
Ling Li	F56-58	Shot put	9.64	1165	2nd place, silver medalist(s)
Liu Miao Miao	F12	Long jump	5.20	-	5
Wang Juan	F44/46	Long jump	4.59	1141	2nd place, silver medalist(s)
Wang Ting	F54/55	Discus	16.47	1091	1st place, gold medalist(s)
Wang Ting	F54/55	Javelin	10.44	810	8
Wang Ting	F54/55	Shot put	4.71	774	13
Wu Hong Ping	F42-46	Shot put	11.83	1044	6
Xu Hong Bai	F35/36/38	Discus	22.95	1294	2nd place, silver medalist(s)
Xu Hong Bai	F35/36/38	Shot put	7.22	1039	7
Xu Ning	F54/55	Discus	21.51	841	8
Xu Ning	F54/55	Javelin	18.10	880	6
Xu Ning	F54/55	Shot put	7.76	895	5
Yang Bing	F12	Long jump	4.87	-	8
Yang Ou Jing Ling	F44/46	Long jump	5.07	928	11
Yao Juan	F42-46	Shot put	NMR		
Yu Gui Na	F42	Long jump	3.25	-	7
Zhang Liang Min	F12	Shot put	10.12	-	7
Zheng Bao Zhu	F42-46	Discus	31.19	1565	1st place, gold medalist(s)
Zheng Bao Zhu	F42-46	Shot put	9.37	1251	1st place, gold medalist(s)

=== Cycling ===
==== Road cycling ====
Athlete	Event	Time	Rank
Feng Zhen An	Women's road trial LC1-4/CP 3/4	29:55.60	8
Ju Fang Zhou	Women's road trial LC1-4/CP 3/4	29:10.45	7
Qi Tang	Women's road trial LC1-4/CP 3/4	30:28.17	9
Wang Jirong	Women's road trial LC1-4/CP 3/4	DNF	
Xu Yi Mei; Yan Xiaolei (pilot)	Women's combined road race/time trial	22pts	11

==== Track cycling ====
Athlete	Event	Qualification		Final	
Athlete	Event	Time	Rank	Opposition Time	Rank
Feng An Zhen	Women's 1km time trial LC1-4/CP 3/4	—N/a		Zhou (CHN); L 1:17.71	2nd place, silver medalist(s)
Ju Fang Zhou	Women's 1km time trial LC1-4/CP 3/4	—N/a		Zhen (CHN); W 1:15.49 WR	1st place, gold medalist(s)
Qi Tang	Women's 1km time trial LC1-4/CP 3/4	—N/a		Jones (USA); W 1:18/39	3rd place, bronze medalist(s)
Wang Jirong	Women's 1km time trial LC1-4/CP 3/4	—N/a		van Staden (RSA); W 1:23.66	9
Xu Yi Mei; Yan Xiaolei (pilot)	Women's sprint tandem B1-3	—N/a		Marsolais (CAN) / Sweeney (CAN); L 14.962	6
Xu Yi Mei; Yan Xiaolei (pilot)	Women's 1km time trial tandem B1-3	—N/a		Miguelez (ESP) / Grande (ESP); W 1:18.40	10
Xu Yi Mei; Yan Xiaolei (pilot)	Women's 3km individual pursuit tandem B1-3	Hou (AUS) / Ryan (AUS); OVL	7	did not advance	

=== Judo ===
==== Men ====
Athlete	Event	Preliminary	Quarterfinals	Semifinals	Repechage round 1	Repechage round 2	Final/ Bronze medal contest
Athlete	Event	Opposition Result	Opposition Result	Opposition Result	Opposition Result	Opposition Result	Opposition Result
Ren Peng	60 kg	—N/a	Perez (CUB); WO	—N/a	Borges (URU); L 0000-1000	did not advance	
Run Ming Men	100 kg	Hokmabad (IRI); W 0110S-0001C	Moreno (ESP); W 1001C-0010S	Dahmen (GER); W 1001S-0002S	—N/a		Tenorio (BRA); L 0000K-0100 (silver)
Wang Yun Feng	73 kg	Atnabaev (RUS); W 1000-0000	Gonzalez (CUB); W 1000-0010	Moore (USA); W 1001-0000	—N/a		Amaral (BRA); W 1000-0000
Ye Er Lan	81 kg	Junk (GER); L 0001-0010	did not advance				
Zhi Xu Lin	66 kg	Cheng (TPE); L 0013-0120S	did not advance		Brannon (USA); W 1112-0000S	Dae (KOR); W 0031-0000	Shabashov (RUS); W 1010-0101 (bronze)

==== Women ====
Athlete	Event	Preliminary	Quarterfinals	Semifinals	Repechage round	Final/ Bronze medal contest
Athlete	Event	Opposition Result	Opposition Result	Opposition Result	Opposition Result	Opposition Result
Guo Hua Ping	48 kg	—N/a	Potapova (RUS); L 0000-1000	—N/a	Skandli (GRE); W 0220-0000	Arndt (GER); L 0000-1000
Lan Mei Zue	+70 kg	Bye		Bischler (GER); W 0200-0000	—N/a	Olmedo (ESP); W 1000-0000
Lei Li Ping	57 kg	—N/a	Buzmakova (RUS); W 0200-0000	Brussig (GER); L 0000-1000	—N/a	Silva (BRA); L 0000-1000
Qiu Lian Wang	52 kg	—N/a	Aurières (FRA); L 0000-1100	—N/a		da Silva (BRA); W 1000-0000
Zhang Qiong Hui	63 kg	Bye		Kazakova (RUS); L 0000-1000	—N/a	Merenciano (ESP); L 0000-1000

=== Powerlifting ===
==== Men ====
Athlete	Event	Result	Rank
Chen Shang Ming	48 kg	157.5	4
Guo Jing Wu	52 kg	172.5	2nd place, silver medalist(s)
Hai Dong Zhang	75 kg	225.0	1st place, gold medalist(s)
Jian Wang	56 kg	185.0	1st place, gold medalist(s)
Jian Yu	60 kg	180.0	3rd place, bronze medalist(s)
Li Bing	100 kg	232.5	3rd place, bronze medalist(s)
Mao Wu Shun	67.5 kg	200.0	2nd place, silver medalist(s)
Qi Dong	82.5 kg	190.0	9
Wu Ya Dong	90 kg	217.5	3rd place, bronze medalist(s)

==== Women ====
Athlete	Event	Result	Rank
Cui Juan Xiao	44 kg	87.5	3rd place, bronze medalist(s)
Jia You Hua	40 kg	80.0	4
Jian Xin Bian	48 kg	118.0 WR	1st place, gold medalist(s)
Li Fengmei	82.5 kg	122.5	4
Li Zhang Ping	67.5 kg	135.0	2nd place, silver medalist(s)
Rui Fang Li	+82.5 kg	160.0 WR	1st place, gold medalist(s)
Taoying Fu	60 kg	132.5 WR	1st place, gold medalist(s)
Yan Yang	52 kg	102.5	3rd place, bronze medalist(s)
Zhenling Huo	56 kg	112.5	3rd place, bronze medalist(s)
Zhu Mingxia	75 kg	132.5	2nd place, silver medalist(s)

=== Shooting ===
==== Men ====
Athlete	Event	Qualification		Final		
Athlete	Event	Score	Rank	Score	Total	Rank
Huang Wei	Mixed 25m sport pistol SH1	560	7 Q	99.2	659.2	7
Jian Fei Li	Men's 10 m air pistol SH1	568	2 Q	95.8	663.8	1st place, gold medalist(s)
Jian Fei Li	Mixed 25 m sport pistol SH1	563	6 Q	99.7	662.7	4
Zhao Shan Yuan	Men's 10 m air pistol SH1	554	14	did not advance		
Zhao Shan Yuan	Mixed 25 m sport pistol SH1	558	9	did not advance		

==== Women ====
Athlete	Event	Qualification		Final		
Athlete	Event	Score	Rank	Score	Total	Rank
Liu Jie	Mixed 10 m air rifle standing SH2	598	6 Q	102.2	700.2	8
Liu Jie	Mixed 10 m air rifle prone SH2	600 =WR	1 Q	103.9	703.9	5
Xiao Wei Dong	Women's 10 m air rifle standing SH1	385	7 Q	102.5	487.5	4
Xu Yan Qin	Mixed 10 m air rifle prone SH1	597	14	did not advance		
Xu Yan Qin	Women's 50 m rifle 3x20 SH1	557	4 Q	89.3	646.3	5
Zhang Nan	Women's 10 m air rifle standing SH1	383	9	did not advance		
Zhang Nan	Women's 50 m rifle 3x20 SH1	558	3 Q	91.8	649.8	4

=== Swimming ===
==== Men ====
Athlete	Class	Event	Heats		Final	
Athlete	Class	Event	Result	Rank	Result	Rank
Baoren Gong	SB7	100m breaststroke	1:27.3	4 Q	1:24.20	2nd place, silver medalist(s)
Bin Wu	S12	50m freestyle	25.69	2 Q	25.69	3rd place, bronze medalist(s)
Bin Wu	S12	100m freestyle	59.54	12	did not advance	
Guo Zhi	S9	100m backstroke	1:11.21	9	did not advance	
Guo Zhi	SM9	200m individual medley	2:31.90	7 Q	2:32.39	7
Guo Yang	S11	50m freestyle	31.41	9	did not advance	
Guo Yang	SB11	100m breaststroke	1:22.95	4 Q	1:24.03	5
Hai Bin Zeng	S4	50m backstroke	49.96	2 Q	50.46	3rd place, bronze medalist(s)
Hai Bin Zeng	S4	50m butterfly	55.58	5 Q	56.80	4
Hai Bin Zeng	SM4	150m individual medley	3:03.21	9	did not advance	
Huang Zhaohang	SB9	100m breaststroke	1:14.17	4 Q	1:13.74	4
Jian Ping Du	S3	50m backstroke	1:01.80	6 Q	53.66	1st place, gold medalist(s)
Jian Ping Du	S3	50m freestyle	48.81	3 Q	49.78	2nd place, silver medalist(s)
Jian Ping Du	S3	100m freestyle	1:49.03	1 Q	1:48.00	2nd place, silver medalist(s)
Jian Ping Du	S3	200m freestyle	4:15.00	3 Q	3:44.99	2nd place, silver medalist(s)
Jian Ping Du	SM3	150m individual medley	3:14.83	3 Q	3:00.50 WR	1st place, gold medalist(s)
Jianhua Yin	S6	50m freestyle	31.29	1 Q	30.80 WR	1st place, gold medalist(s)
Jianhua Yin	S6	100m backstroke	1:34.54	12	did not advance	
Jianhua Yin	S6	100m freestyle	1:08.62	1 Q	1:07.60 WR	1st place, gold medalist(s)
Jiang Sheng Quan	S10	100m butterfly	1:04.59	9	did not advance	
Jing Liu Yan	S8	100m backstroke	1:19.90	9	did not advance	
Jing Liu Yan	S8	100m butterfly	1:17.20	8 Q	1:18.85	8
Junquan He	S5	50m backstroke	36.75 WR	1 Q	37.53	1st place, gold medalist(s)
Junquan He	S5	50m butterfly	37.40 WR	1 Q	37.50	1st place, gold medalist(s)
Junquan He	SM5	200m individual medley	3:08.11	2 Q	3:04.15 WR	1st place, gold medalist(s)
Li Jun	SB9	100m breaststroke	1:17.39	9	did not advance	
Li Jun	S10	400m freestyle	4:39.53	10	did not advance	
Li Keqiang	SB8	100m breaststroke	1:19.71	3 Q	1:19.47	3rd place, bronze medalist(s)
Li Peng	S6	50m butterfly	33.09	2 Q	32.82	1st place, gold medalist(s)
Li Peng	SB7	100m breaststroke	1:27.12	3 Q	1:25.72	3rd place, bronze medalist(s)
Li Peng	SM6	200m individual medley	3:07:37	5 Q	3:03.42	4
Li Rong	S9	100m backstroke	1:12.40	9	did not advance	
Li Rong	S9	400m freestyle	5:09.74	15	did not advance	
Liu Ce	SB7	100m breaststroke	1:31.75	8 Q	1:32.14	7
Mang Pei	S7	50m butterfly	33.47	3 Q	32.91	2nd place, silver medalist(s)
Mang Pei	SM7	200m individual medley	2:59.69	9	did not advance	
Renjie Wang	S9	50m freestyle	27.13	2 Q	26.82	2nd place, silver medalist(s)
Renjie Wang	S9	100m backstroke	1:08.06	3 Q	1:07.54	4
Renjie Wang	S9	100m freestyle	1:00.12	5 Q	59.58	6
Tang Yuan	S6	50m freestyle	40.31	15	did not advance	
Tian Rong	S7	50m butterfly	31.91 WR	1 Q	31.32 WR	1st place, gold medalist(s)
Tian Rong	S7	50m freestyle	31.52	10	did not advance	
Tian Rong	S7	100m freestyle	1:08.08	7 Q	1:08.41	8
Tian Rong	S7	400m freestyle	5:14.05	4 Q	5:01.84	2nd place, silver medalist(s)
Tian Rong	SM7	200m individual medley	2:48.35	4 Q	2:53.50	5
Wang Chen	S11	50m freestyle	29.64	9	did not advance	
Wang Chen	S11	100m backstroke	1:22.49	10	did not advance	
Wang Chen	S11	100m butterfly	1:17.46	4 Q	1:14.96	5
Wang Chen	S11	100m freestyle	1:08.91	10	did not advance	
Wang Chen	SM11	200m individual medley	N/A		2:50.59	6
Wang Jia Chao	S8	100m butterfly	1:06.89	2 Q	1:11.29	4
Xia Kai	S6	50m butterfly	34.26	3 Q	34.20	4
Xiao Fu Wang	S8	50m butterfly	27.33 WR	1 Q	26.84 WR	1st place, gold medalist(s)
Xiao Fu Wang	S8	100m backstroke	1:12.30	1 Q	1:14.88	4
Xiao Fu Wang	S8	100m butterfly	1:06.89	2 Q	1:05.20 WR	1st place, gold medalist(s)
Xiao Fu Wang	S8	100m freestyle	1:06.00	10	did not advance	
Xiao Fu Wang	S8	400m freestyle	5:07.23	7 Q	4:58.73	5
Xiao Fu Wang	SM8	200m individual medley	N/A		2:26.82 WR	1st place, gold medalist(s)
Xiao Ming Xiong	S9	50m freestyle	26.86	1 Q	26.37	1st place, gold medalist(s)
Xiao Ming Xiong	S9	100m butterfly	DSQ		did not advance	
Xiao Ming Xiong	S9	100m freestyle	59.72	3 Q	58.74	2nd place, silver medalist(s)
Xiao Ming Xiong	SM9	200m individual medley	2:32.04	8 Q	DSQ	
Yang Fu	S10	100m butterfly	DSQ		did not advance	
Yang Fu	SM10	200m individual medley	2:30.24	9	did not advance	
Yu Qi Min	S10	100m butterfly	1:16.10	14	did not advance	
Yu Qi Min	S10	100m freestyle	1:02.48	18	did not advance	
Yuan Jie	SB5	100m breaststroke	DSQ		did not advance	
Yang Run Yuan	S6	100m backstroke	1:19.71	3 Q	1:24.21	7
Yang Run Yuan	S6	200m individual medley	3:00.70	2 Q	3:01.94	2nd place, silver medalist(s)
Yuan Tang	S6	100m backstroke	1:19.71	3 Q	1:17.91	2nd place, silver medalist(s)
Yuan Tang	S6	100m freestyle	1:10.30	4 Q	1:09.04	2nd place, silver medalist(s)
Yuan Tang	S6	400m freestyle	5:13.30	2 Q	5:14.10	2nd place, silver medalist(s)
Zhang Jinbo	S6	50m freestyle	34.27	10	did not advance	
Zhang Jinbo	SM6	200m individual medley	3:04.87	4 Q	3:03.73	5
Li Peng; Junquan He; Baoren Gong; Jian Du Ping	N/A	4x50m freestyle 20pts	2:39.07	3 Q	2:27.04	1st place, gold medalist(s)
Xiao Ming Xiong; Jianhua Yin; Yu Qi Min; Renjie Wang	N/A	4 × 100 m freestyle	4:12.15	5 Q	4:06.01	3rd place, bronze medalist(s)
Li Peng; Jianhua Yin; Yuan Tang; Jian Du Ping	N/A	4x50m medley 20pts	2:52.26	4 Q	2:47.06	4
Renjie Wang; Li Keqiang; Xiao Fu Wang; Xiao Ming Xiong	N/A	4 × 100 m medley 34pts	4:35.89	2 Q	4:30.19	2nd place, silver medalist(s)

==== Women ====
Athlete	Class	Event	Heats		Final	
Athlete	Class	Event	Result	Rank	Result	Rank
Cong Rui	SB12	100m breaststroke	1:29.41	6 Q	1:26.18	4
Dong Qiming	S11	50m freestyle	35.15	6 Q	35.72	8
Dong Qiming	S11	100m backstroke	1:23.37	1 Q	1:22.35	1st place, gold medalist(s)
Dong Qiming	S11	100m freestyle	1:21.67	8 Q	1:20.10	8
Hong Yan Zhu	S12	50m freestyle	29.26	1 Q	28.02 WR	1st place, gold medalist(s)
Hong Yan Zhu	S12	100m backstroke	N/A		1:08.89 WR	1st place, gold medalist(s)
Hong Yan Zhu	S12	100m butterfly	1:06.65	1 Q	1:06.61	2nd place, silver medalist(s)
Hong Yan Zhu	S12	100m freestyle	1:04.15	2 Q	1:01.99	1st place, gold medalist(s)
Hong Yan Zhu	SB12	100m breaststroke	1:27.23	5 Q	1:26.48	6
Hong Yan Zhu	SM12	200m individual medley	2:36.61	1 Q	2:30.09 WR	1st place, gold medalist(s)
Huang Min	S7	50m butterfly	38.67	1 Q	37.47	2nd place, silver medalist(s)
Huang Min	S7	50m freestyle	36.65	6 Q	36.26	6
Huang Min	S7	100m freestyle	1:21.97	9	did not advance	
Huang Min	SB7	100m breaststroke	1:43.23	3 Q	1:39.51	3rd place, bronze medalist(s)
Huang Min	SM7	200m individual medley	3:11.91	3 Q	3:05.57	2nd place, silver medalist(s)
Jiang Fuying	SM6	200m individual medley	3:32.88	5 Q	3:36.25	6
Jiang Min	S9	100m butterfly	1:26.54	18	did not advance	
Li Fang	S10	50m freestyle	32.64	12	did not advance	
Li Fang	S10	100m butterfly	1:38.61	9	did not advance	
Li Weiyuan	S8	50m freestyle	35.79	9	did not advance	
Li Weiyuan	SM8	200m individual medley	3:04.35	3 Q	3:06.15	4
Qian Hui Yu	S10	50m freestyle	33.05	14	did not advance	
Qian Hui Yu	S10	100m butterfly	1:21.66	7 Q	1:22.51	7
Qian Hui Yu	SM10	200m individual medley	2:52.21	8 Q	2:52.16	6
Wang Shuai	S10	50m freestyle	31.51	8 Q	31.17	8
Wang Shuai	SM10	200m individual medley	2:53.51	9	did not advance	
Xiao Min	S8	100m butterfly	1:29.27	7 Q	1:26.74	4
Xu Yanru	S8	100m backstroke	1:32.03	8 Q	1:33.23	8
Xu Yanru	SM8	200m individual medley	3:09.72	6 Q	3:08.90	5
Yang Libo	SB7	100m breaststroke	1:52.44	7	DSQ	
Yang Weijia	S8	100m butterfly	1:27.61	5 Q	DNS	
Yang Weijia	SM8	200m individual medley	3:10.45	8 Q	3:11.37	7
Yang Yan Lian	S8	100m butterfly	1:33.35	8 Q	1:27.64	6
Zhang Yuan	S11	50m freestyle	36.62	10	did not advance	
Zhang Yuan	S11	100m backstroke	1:30.20	6 Q	1:30.22	7
Zhao Chunhua	SM9	200m individual medley	3:07.05	15	did not advance	
Zhou Chunhua	S9	100m butterfly	1:22.67	13	did not advance	
Zhou Zi Cun	S9	100m butterfly	1:21.76	11	did not advance	

=== Table tennis ===
==== Men's singles ====
Athlete	Event	Preliminaries				Quarterfinals	Semifinals	Final / BM	
Athlete	Event	Opposition Result	Opposition Result	Opposition Result	Rank	Opposition Result	Opposition Result	Opposition Result	Rank
Ge Yang	Singles class 10	Ruiz (ESP); W 3-2	Bereczki (HUN); W 3-0	—N/a	1	Agudo (ESP); W 3-1	Gaspar (SVK); L 0-3	Ruiz (ESP); W 3-2	1st place, gold medalist(s)
Li Manzhou	Singles class 8	Valera (ESP); W 3-1	Fu (TPE); W 3-1	Soyer (FRA); W 3-1	1	Glikman (ISR); L 2-3	did not advance		
Lu Xiaolei	Singles class 9	Fraczyk (AUT); L 0-3	Chateigner (FRA); W 3–0	—N/a	2	Tomioka (JPN); W 3-1	Zborai (HUN); W 3–1	Fraczyk (AUT); L 0–3	2nd place, silver medalist(s)
Qin Xiao Jun	Singles class 7	Wollmert (GER); L 0-3	Popov (UKR); W 3-1	Loennberg (SWE); W 3-0	2	Morales (ESP); L 2-3	did not advance		
Zhang Jie	Singles class 4	Pechard (FRA); L 1-3	Kober (GER); L 2-3	Hyung (KOR); L 2-3	4	did not advance			
Zhang Yan	Singles class 4	Stefanu (CZE); W 3-0	Chan (GBR); W 3-1	Freitas (BRA); W 3-0	1	Kober (GER); W 3-2	Martin (FRA); W 3-1	Stefanu (CZE); W 3-2	1st place, gold medalist(s)

==== Men's teams ====
Athlete	Event	Preliminaries				Semifinals	Final / BM	
Athlete	Event	Opposition Result	Opposition Result	Opposition Result	Rank	Opposition Result	Opposition Result	Rank
Li Manzhou; Qin Xiao Jun	Teams class 8	Belgium (BEL); L 0-3	Spain (ESP); W 3-0	Czech Republic (CZE); W 3-1	2	France (FRA); L 0-3	Slovakia (SVK); L 2-3	4
Lu Xiaolei; Ge Yang	Teams class 10	France (FRA); W 3-2	Spain (ESP); W 3-1	Israel (ISR); W 3-1	1	Sweden (SWE); W 3-1	France (FRA); W 3-1	1st place, gold medalist(s)
Zhang Jie; Zhang Yan	Teams class 4	South Korea (KOR); L 2-3	Brazil (BRA); W 3-1	—N/a	2	France (FRA); L 3-0	Germany (GER); W 3-1	3rd place, bronze medalist(s)

==== Women's singles ====
Athlete	Event	Preliminaries				Quarterfinals	Semifinals	Final / BM	
Athlete	Event	Opposition Result	Opposition Result	Opposition Result	Rank	Opposition Result	Opposition Result	Opposition Result	Rank
Chen Wei Hong	Singles class 5	Palasse (FRA); W 3-0	Chin (TPE); W 3-1	Ling (HKG); W 3-1	1	—N/a	Hui (TPE); W 3-2	Ren (CHN); L 0-3	2nd place, silver medalist(s)
Gu Gai	Singles class 5	Pivarciova (CZE); L 1-3	Hoffmann (MEX); L 2-3	Bessho (JPN); L 2-3	4	did not advance			
Li Yu Qiang	Singles class 10	Matouskova (CZE); L 1-3	Jagodzinska (POL); W 3-2	Sevin (FRA); W 3-0	2	—N/a	Partyka (POL); L 0-3	Kudo (JPN); W 3-2	3rd place, bronze medalist(s)
Lei Lina	Singles class 9	Komleva (RUS); W 3-1	Kavas (TUR); W 3-1	Mairie (FRA); W/O	1	—N/a	Kamkasomphou (FRA); W 3-2	Liu (CHN); L 3-2	2nd place, silver medalist(s)
Liu Mei Li	Singles class 5	Kamkasomphou (FRA); W 3-0	Grzelak (POL); W 3-0	Muylaert (BEL); W 3-0	1	—N/a	Komleva (RUS); W 3-0	Lei (CHN); W 3-2	1st place, gold medalist(s)
Ren Gui Xiang	Singles class 5	Hui (TPE); W 3–0	Abuawad (JOR); W 3–0	—N/a	1	—N/a	Pivarciova (CZE); W 3–1	Chen (CHN); W 3–0	1st place, gold medalist(s)
Zhang Xiaoling	Singles class 6-8	Barbusova (SVK); W 3-1	Glinska (POL); W 3-0	—N/a	3	—N/a	Ovsjannikova (RUS); W 3-0	Kovacs (SWE); W 3-1	1st place, gold medalist(s)

==== Women's teams ====
Athlete	Event	Preliminaries					Semifinals	Final / BM	
Athlete	Event	Opposition Result	Opposition Result	Opposition Result	Opposition Result	Rank	Opposition Result	Opposition Result	Rank
Gu Gai; Ren Gui Xiang; Chen Wei Hong	Teams class 4-5	—N/a		France (FRA); W 3-0	Slovenia (SLO); W 3-0	1	Jordan (JOR); W 3-0	Chinese Taipei (TPE); W 3-0	1st place, gold medalist(s)
Lei Lina; Li Yu Qiang; Zhang Xiaoling; Liu Mei Li	Teams class 6-10	Poland (POL); W 3-2	France (FRA); W 3-0	Russia (RUS); W 3-0	Czech Republic (CZE); W 3-1	—N/a			1st place, gold medalist(s)

=== Volleyball ===
==== Women's team ====
The team earned a gold medal in this competition.

- Chen Yu Ping
- Sheng Yu Hong
- Yang Yan Ling
- Xue Jun
- Zhang Xu Fei
- Li Li Ping
- Zhao Jin Qiu
- Zheng Xiong Ying
- Gong Bin
- Tan Yanhua
- Lu Hong Qin

==== Results ====
Game	Match	Score	Rank
1	China vs. Netherlands (NED)	3 - 1	1 Q
2	China vs. United States (USA)	3 - 0	1 Q
3	China vs. Slovenia (SLO)	3 - 0	1 Q
4	China vs. Finland (FIN)	3 - 0	1 Q
5	China vs. Ukraine (UKR)	3 - 0	1 Q
Semifinals	China vs. Slovenia (SLO)	3 - 0	W
Gold medal final	China vs. Netherlands (NED)	3 - 1	1st place, gold medalist(s)

=== Wheelchair fencing ===
==== Men's individual events ====
Athlete	Event	Qualification			Round of 16	Quarterfinal	Semifinal	Final / BM	
Athlete	Event	Opposition	Score	Rank	Opposition Score	Opposition Score	Opposition Score	Opposition Score	Rank
Hu Dao Liang	Men's épée B	Shenkevych (UKR)	W 5-1	1 Q	Alsaedi (KUW); W 15-11	Rodgers (USA); L 15-9	did not advance		
Hu Dao Liang	Men's épée B	Rodgers (USA)	W 5-4	1 Q	Alsaedi (KUW); W 15-11	Rodgers (USA); L 15-9	did not advance		
Hu Dao Liang	Men's épée B	Wysmierski (POL)	W 5-3	1 Q	Alsaedi (KUW); W 15-11	Rodgers (USA); L 15-9	did not advance		
Hu Dao Liang	Men's épée B	Francois (FRA)	W 5-2	1 Q	Alsaedi (KUW); W 15-11	Rodgers (USA); L 15-9	did not advance		
Hu Dao Liang	Men's épée B	Heaton (GBR)	W 5-2	1 Q	Alsaedi (KUW); W 15-11	Rodgers (USA); L 15-9	did not advance		
Hu Dao Liang	Men's foil A	Francois (FRA)	W 5-4	3 Q	Shenkevych (UKR); L 14-15	did not advance			
Hu Dao Liang	Men's foil A	Alsaedi (KUW)	W 5-2	3 Q	Shenkevych (UKR); L 14-15	did not advance			
Hu Dao Liang	Men's foil A	Komar (UKR)	L 4-5	3 Q	Shenkevych (UKR); L 14-15	did not advance			
Hu Dao Liang	Men's foil A	Wong (HKG)	L 3-5	3 Q	Shenkevych (UKR); L 14-15	did not advance			
Zhang Chong	Men's épée A	Maillard (FRA)	W 5-3	4 Q	Zhang (CHN); L 14-15	did not advance			
Zhang Chong	Men's épée A	Pender (POL)	L 4-5	4 Q	Zhang (CHN); L 14-15	did not advance			
Zhang Chong	Men's épée A	Doeme (HUN)	L 2-5	4 Q	Zhang (CHN); L 14-15	did not advance			
Zhang Chong	Men's épée A	Kwong (HKG)	W 5-4	4 Q	Zhang (CHN); L 14-15	did not advance			
Zhang Chong	Men's épée A	van der Wege (USA)	W 5-4	4 Q	Zhang (CHN); L 14-15	did not advance			
Zhang Chong	Men's foil A	Pellegrini (ITA)	W 5-2	1 Q	El Assine (FRA); W 15-7	Al Qallaf (KUW); L 12-15	did not advance		
Zhang Chong	Men's foil A	Maillard (FRA)	W 5-0	1 Q	El Assine (FRA); W 15-7	Al Qallaf (KUW); L 12-15	did not advance		
Zhang Chong	Men's foil A	Almansouri (KUW)	W 5-1	1 Q	El Assine (FRA); W 15-7	Al Qallaf (KUW); L 12-15	did not advance		
Zhang Chong	Men's foil A	Rodriguez (ESP)	W 5-0	1 Q	El Assine (FRA); W 15-7	Al Qallaf (KUW); L 12-15	did not advance		
Zhang Lei	Men's épée A	Stanczuk (POL)	L 3–5	2 Q	Zhang (CHN); W 15-14	Kwong (HKG); L 15–14	did not advance		
Zhang Lei	Men's épée A	Citerne (FRA)	W 5-5	2 Q	Zhang (CHN); W 15-14	Kwong (HKG); L 15–14	did not advance		
Zhang Lei	Men's épée A	Ahner (GER)	W 5-0	2 Q	Zhang (CHN); W 15-14	Kwong (HKG); L 15–14	did not advance		
Zhang Lei	Men's épée A	Almansouri (KUW)	W 5-0	2 Q	Zhang (CHN); W 15-14	Kwong (HKG); L 15–14	did not advance		
Zhang Lei	Men's épée A	Sanchez (ESP)	W 5-2	2 Q	Zhang (CHN); W 15-14	Kwong (HKG); L 15–14	did not advance		
Zhang Lei	Men's foil A	Makowski (POL)	W 5-0	1 Q	van der Wege (USA); W 15-8	Pellegrini (ITA); W 15-10	Al Qallaf (KUW); W 15-9	Fung (HKG); L 12-15	2nd place, silver medalist(s)
Zhang Lei	Men's foil A	Chan (HKG)	W 5-0	1 Q	van der Wege (USA); W 15-8	Pellegrini (ITA); W 15-10	Al Qallaf (KUW); W 15-9	Fung (HKG); L 12-15	2nd place, silver medalist(s)
Zhang Lei	Men's foil A	van der Wege (USA)	W 5-2	1 Q	van der Wege (USA); W 15-8	Pellegrini (ITA); W 15-10	Al Qallaf (KUW); W 15-9	Fung (HKG); L 12-15	2nd place, silver medalist(s)
Zhang Lei	Men's foil A	Fernandez (ESP)	W 5-4	1 Q	van der Wege (USA); W 15-8	Pellegrini (ITA); W 15-10	Al Qallaf (KUW); W 15-9	Fung (HKG); L 12-15	2nd place, silver medalist(s)
Zhang Lei	Men's foil A	Khder (IRQ)	W 5-4	1 Q	van der Wege (USA); W 15-8	Pellegrini (ITA); W 15-10	Al Qallaf (KUW); W 15-9	Fung (HKG); L 12-15	2nd place, silver medalist(s)

==== Men's team events ====
Athletes	Event	Quarterfinal	Semifinal	Final / BM	
Athletes	Event	Opposition Score	Opposition Score	Opposition Score	Rank
Hu Dao Liang; Zhang Chong; Zhang Lei	Men's épée team	Germany (GER); W 45-38	Poland (POL); L 45-34	France (FRA); W 45-32	3rd place, bronze medalist(s)
Hu Dao Liang; Zhang Chong; Zhang Lei	Men's foil team	United States (USA); W 45-29	Poland (POL); W 45-41	Hong Kong (HKG); W 45-41	1st place, gold medalist(s)

=== Wheelchair tennis ===
Athlete	Class	Event	First round	1/8 finals	Quarterfinals	Semifinals	Finals
Athlete	Class	Event	Opposition Result	Opposition Result	Opposition Result	Opposition Result	Opposition Result
Xiaoqing Liu	Open	Men's singles	Jaroszewski (POL); L 1-6, 0-6	did not advance			
Fuli Dong	Open	Women's singles	Perry (NZL); W 6-1, 6-0	Khanthasit (THA); L 0-6, 1-6	did not advance		

== See also ==
- China at the Paralympics
- China at the 2004 Summer Olympics
