= Yongling =

Yongling, Yong Ling or Yong Mausoleum (永陵) may refer to:

- Yongling (Former Shu), the tomb of Wang Jian (847–918) in Chengdu, Sichuan, China
- Yongling (Ming dynasty), the tomb of the Jiajing Emperor (1507–1567) in Beijing
- Yongling (Qing dynasty), the tomb of descendants of Fuman in Liaoning, China
- Yongling (Shaanxi), a historical site in Shaanxi

== See also ==
- Ling Yong (born 1978), Chinese Paralympic athlete
