= Table tennis at the 2004 Summer Paralympics – Men's individual – Class 4 =

Table Tennis - Men's Singles 4 at the XII Paralympic Games
- Paralympic Table Tennis
- Venue: Galatsi Olympic Hall
- Dates: 18–21 September 2004
- Competitors: 20 from 14 nations

Medalists
1st place, gold medalist(s)		Zhang Yan	China
2nd place, silver medalist(s)		Michal Stefanu	Czech Republic
3rd place, bronze medalist(s)		Choi Kyoung Sik	South Korea

The Men's Singles 4 table tennis competition at the 2004 Summer Paralympics was held from 18 to 21 September at the Galatsi Olympic Hall.

Classes 1-5 were for athletes with a physical impairment that affected their legs, who competed in a sitting position. The lower the number, the greater the impact the impairment was on an athlete’s ability to compete.

The event was won by Zhang Yan, representing China.

== Results ==
=== Preliminaries ===
Qualified for final round

==== Group A ====
Rank	Competitor	MP	W	L	Points	KOR	TPE	GER	VEN
1	Choi Kyoung Sik (KOR)	3	2	1	8:3	x	2:3	3:0	3:0
2	Lin Wen Hsin (TPE)	3	2	1	7:5	3:2	x	1:3	3:0
3	Werner Burkhardt (GER)	3	2	1	6:4	0:3	3:1	x	3:0
4	Gustavo Sandoval (VEN)	3	0	3	0:9	0:3	0:3	0:3	x

==== Group B ====
Rank	Competitor	MP	W	L	Points	CHN	CZE	GBR	BRA
1	Zhang Yan (CHN)	3	3	0	9:1	x	3:0	3:1	3:0
2	Michal Stefanu (CZE)	3	2	1	6:3	0:3	x	3:0	3:0
3	Arnie Chan (GBR)	3	1	2	4:8	1:3	0:3	x	3:2
4	Ivanildo Freitas (BRA)	3	0	3	2:9	0:3	0:3	2:3	x

==== Group C ====
Rank	Competitor	MP	W	L	Points	BEL	FRA	POL	KOR
1	Dimitri Ghion (BEL)	3	3	0	9:3	x	3:1	3:0	3:2
2	Emeric Martin (FRA)	3	2	1	7:6	1:3	x	3:2	3:1
3	Rafal Lis (POL)	3	1	2	5:7	0:3	2:3	x	3:1
4	Park Jun-young (KOR)	3	0	3	4:9	2:3	1:3	1:3	x

==== Group D ====
Rank	Competitor	MP	W	L	Points	ITA	SUI	FRA	EGY
1	Salvatore Caci (ITA)	3	2	1	8:5	x	2:3	3:2	3:0
2	Christian Sutter (SUI)	3	2	1	8:6	3:2	x	2:3	3:1
3	Bruno Benedetti (FRA)	3	2	1	8:7	2:3	3:2	x	3:2
4	Sameh Mohammad Eid (EGY)	3	0	3	3:9	0:3	1:3	2:3	x

==== Group E ====
Rank	Competitor	MP	W	L	Points	FRA	GER	KOR	CHN
1	Sebastien Pechard (FRA)	3	3	0	9:4	x	3:1	3:2	3:1
2	Dietmar Kober (GER)	3	2	1	7:6	1:3	x	3:1	3:2
3	Um Tae Hyung (KOR)	3	1	2	6:8	2:3	1:3	x	3:2
4	Zhang Jie (CHN)	3	0	3	5:9	1:3	2:3	2:3	x

=== Competition bracket ===
Round of 16
Sebastien Pechard (FRA)	1
Michal Stefanu (CZE)	3
Lin Wen Hsin (TPE)	0
Emeric Martin (FRA)	3

Quarterfinals
Choi Kyoung Sik (KOR)	3
Christian Sutter (SUI)	0
Michal Stefanu (CZE)	3
Dimitri Ghion (BEL)	1
Salvatore Caci (ITA)	1
Emeric Martin (FRA)	3
Dietmar Kober (GER)	2
Zhang Yan (CHN)	3

Semifinals
Choi Kyoung Sik (KOR)	0
Michal Stefanu (CZE)	3
Emeric Martin (FRA)	1
Zhang Yan (CHN)	3

Final
Michal Stefanu (CZE)	2
Zhang Yan (CHN)	3
Third place
Choi Kyoung Sik (KOR)	3
Emeric Martin (FRA)	1
