= Swimming at the 2004 Summer Paralympics – Men's 100 metre breaststroke SB12 =

Men's 100m Breaststroke SB12 at the XII Paralympic Games
- Paralympic Swimming
- Venue: Olympic Aquatic Centre
- Dates: 20 September 2004
- Competitors: 17 from 10 nations
- Winning time: 1:10.99

Medalists
1st place, gold medalist(s)		Dmytro Aleksyeyev	Ukraine
2nd place, silver medalist(s)		Sergei Punko	Belarus
3rd place, bronze medalist(s)		Dmytro Kuzmin	Ukraine

The Men's 100 metre breaststroke SB12 swimming event at the 2004 Summer Paralympics was competed on 20 September. It was won by Dmytro Aleksyeyev, representing Ukraine.

== 1st round ==
Qualified for next round

Heat 1

20 Sept. 2004, morning session

Rank	Athlete	Time	Notes
1	Robert Musiorski (POL)	1:14.23	
2	Yury Rudzenok (BLR)	1:15.03	
3	Sergiy Klippert (UKR)	1:15.46	
4	Koshiro Sugita (JPN)	1:20.14	
5	Christophe Deteix (FRA)	1:23.80	

Heat 2

20 Sept. 2004, morning session

Rank	Athlete	Time	Notes
1	Dmytro Aleksyeyev (UKR)	1:11.49	
2	Darren Leach (GBR)	1:17.76	
3	Raman Makarau (BLR)	1:19.62	
4	Emmanuel Provost (FRA)	1:19.97	
5	Juan Diego Gil (ESP)	1:22.08	
6	Alessandro Serpico (ITA)	1:24.15	

Heat 3

20 Sept. 2004, morning session

Rank	Athlete	Time	Notes
1	Sergei Punko (BLR)	1:12.54	
2	Dmytro Kuzmin (UKR)	1:15.13	
3	Enrique Floriano (ESP)	1:16.28	
4	Daniel Llambrich (ESP)	1:16.93	
5	Kitipong Sribunrueng (THA)	1:16.95	
6	Jeremy McClure (AUS)	1:22.69	

== Final round ==
20 Sept. 2004, evening session

Rank	Athlete	Time	Notes
1st place, gold medalist(s)	Dmytro Aleksyeyev (UKR)	1:10.99	
2nd place, silver medalist(s)	Sergei Punko (BLR)	1:11.27	
3rd place, bronze medalist(s)	Dmytro Kuzmin (UKR)	1:13.69	
4	Sergiy Klippert (UKR)	1:14.03	
5	Robert Musiorski (POL)	1:14.08	
6	Yury Rudzenok (BLR)	1:14.29	
7	Enrique Floriano (ESP)	1:16.96	
8	Daniel Llambrich (ESP)	1:17.15	
