= Rene Nielsen =

Danish Paralympic athlete

René Nielsen
Personal information
- Born: 13 June 1967 (age 59)

Sport
- Country: Denmark
- Sport: Paralympic athletics
- Disability class: F56
Medal record
Track and field
Representing Denmark
Paralympic Games
Gold medal – first place	2000 Sydney	Javelin throw F56
Silver medal – second place	2000 Sydney	Shot put F56
Bronze medal – third place	2000 Sydney	Pentathlon P58
Bronze medal – third place	2004 Athens	Pentathlon P54-58
Bronze medal – third place	2004 Athens	Shot put F56
World Championships
Gold medal – first place	2002 Lille	Javelin throw F56
Silver medal – second place	1998 Birmingham	Shot put F56
Silver medal – second place	2002 Lille	Shot put F56
Silver medal – second place	2002 Lille	Pentathlon P54-58

René Nielsen (born 13 June 1967) is a Paralympic former athlete from Denmark competing mainly in category P56 pentathlon events. He now works as an ambassador and has worked as a mental coach in the Danish Superliga.

He competed in the 2000 Summer Paralympics in Sydney, Australia. There he won a gold medal in the men's javelin throw F56, a silver medal in the men's shot put F56 and a bronze medal in the men's pentathlon P58. He also competed at the 2004 Summer Paralympics in Athens, Greece. There he won a bronze medal in the men's Pentathlon P54-58, a bronze medal in the men's shot put F56 and finished fourth in the men's javelin throw F55-56.

Nielsen lost both of his legs in a train accident in 1991. His autobiography Half a Man - A Whole Person is a bestseller in Denmark selling 50,000 copies.
