= Roberto La Barbera =

Italian Paralympic athlete

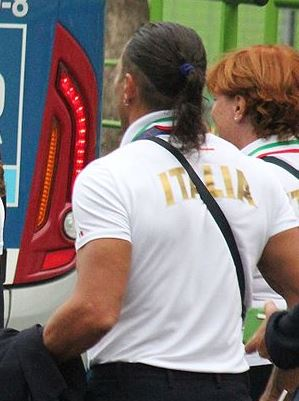

Personal information
- Nationality: Italian
- Born: 25 February 1967 (age 59) Alessandria, Italy
- Height: 1.83 m (6 ft 0 in)
- Weight: 75 kg (165 lb)

Sport
- Country: Italy
- Sport: Paralympic athletics
- Disability: Unilateral amputation
- Club: ASD Scanavino Team
- Coached by: Alessandro Kuris
Medal record
Men's para athletics
Representing Italy
Paralympic Games
Silver medal – second place	2004 Athens	Long jump - F44
World Championships
Silver medal – second place	2002 Lille	Long jump - F44
Bronze medal – third place	2002 Lille	Pentathlon - P44
Bronze medal – third place	2006 Assen	Long jump - F44
European Championships
Bronze medal – third place	2016 Grosseto	4x100m relay - T42-47

Roberto La Barbera (born 25 February 1967) is a paralympic athlete from Italy competing mainly in category F44 long jump and pentathlon events.

== Biography ==
La Barbera has competed in three Paralympic Games winning a silver medal. His first games were in 2000 Summer Paralympics where he competed in the 200m, 400m, 800m, discus, long jump and pentathlon but was unable to win any medals. This he corrected in 2004 where he won a silver medal in the long jump as well as competing in the 400m, 4 × 100 m and pentathlon. His third games were in Beijing in 2008 where he competed in the long jump and pentathlon but was unable to win a second medal.

== Achievements ==
Year	Competition	Venue	Position	Event	Measure
2004	Paralympics Games	(Greece) Athens	2nd	Long jump F44	6.45 m
