= Shooting at the 2004 Summer Paralympics – Men's 10 metre air pistol SH1 =

Men's 10m Air Pistol SH1 at the XII Paralympic Games
- Paralympic Shooting
- Venue: Markopoulo Olympic Shooting Centre
- Dates: 18 September 2004
- Competitors: 32 from 21 nations
- Winning points: 663.8

Medalists
| 1st place, gold medalist(s) | | Li Jian Fei | China |
| 2nd place, silver medalist(s) | | Vanco Karanfilov | Macedonia |
| 3rd place, bronze medalist(s) | | Hubert Aufschnaiter | Austria |

The Men's 10m Air Pistol SH1 shooting event at the 2004 Summer Paralympics was competed on 18 September. It was won by Li Jian Fei, representing China.

== Preliminary ==
| Qualified for next round |

18 Sept. 2004, 11:45

| Rank | Athlete | Points | Notes |
|---|---|---|---|
| 1 | Vanco Karanfilov (MKD) | 570 | Q |
| 2 | Li Jian Fei (CHN) | 568 | Q |
| 3 | Hubert Aufschnaiter (AUT) | 564 | Q |
| 4 | Giancarlo Iori (ITA) | 563 | Q |
| 5 | Jan Boonen (BEL) | 563 | Q |
| 6 | Lee Hee Jeong (KOR) | 561 | Q |
| 7 | Muharrem Korhan Yamac (TUR) | 560 | Q |
| 8 | Hsu Jui Jen (TPE) | 560 | Q |
| 9 | Seppo Jolkkonen (FIN) | 558 | |
| 10 | Kenneth Pettersson (SWE) | 558 | |
| 11 | Branimir Jovanovski (MKD) | 557 | |
| 12 | Kenji Ohashi (JPN) | 556 | |
| 13 | Roland Hartmann (GER) | 555 | |
| 14 | Kai Uwe Liebehenz (GER) | 554 | |
| 14 | Andrey Lebedinsky (RUS) | 554 | |
| 14 | Oskar Kreuzer (AUT) | 554 | |
| 14 | Choi Jong In (KOR) | 554 | |
| 14 | Jamal Asadi (IRI) | 554 | |
| 19 | Zhao Shan Yuan (CHN) | 554 | |
| 20 | Victor Stepanov (RUS) | 553 | |
| 21 | Ivano Borgato (ITA) | 551 | |
| 21 | Blaz Beljan (CRO) | 551 | |
| 23 | Ernest Jazbinsek (SLO) | 550 | |
| 23 | Slawomir Okoniewski (POL) | 550 | |
| 23 | Patrik Plattner (SUI) | 550 | |
| 26 | Otto Koller (SUI) | 549 | |
| 26 | Francisco Angel Soriano (ESP) | 549 | |
| 28 | Eliahu Chabra (ISR) | 548 | |
| 29 | Damir Bosnjak (CRO) | 547 | |
| 30 | Ilan Zaltsman (ISR) | 543 | |
| 31 | Frank Wunderlich (GER) | 540 | |
| | Vonnie Koehne (RSA) | DNS | |

== Final round ==
18 Sept. 2004, 15:15

| Rank | Athlete | Points | Notes |
|---|---|---|---|
| 1st place, gold medalist(s) | Li Jian Fei (CHN) | 663.8 | |
| 2nd place, silver medalist(s) | Vanco Karanfilov (MKD) | 661.6 | |
| 3rd place, bronze medalist(s) | Hubert Aufschnaiter (AUT) | 658.6 | |
| 4 | Muharrem Korhan Vamac (TUR) | 658.1 | |
| 5 | Lee Hee Jeong (KOR) | 657.6 | |
| 6 | Giancarlo Iori (ITA) | 656.9 | |
| 7 | Hsu Jui Jen (TPE) | 654.4 | |
| 8 | Jan Boonen (BEL) | 652.8 | |
