= Pieter Gruijters =

Dutch Paralympic athlete

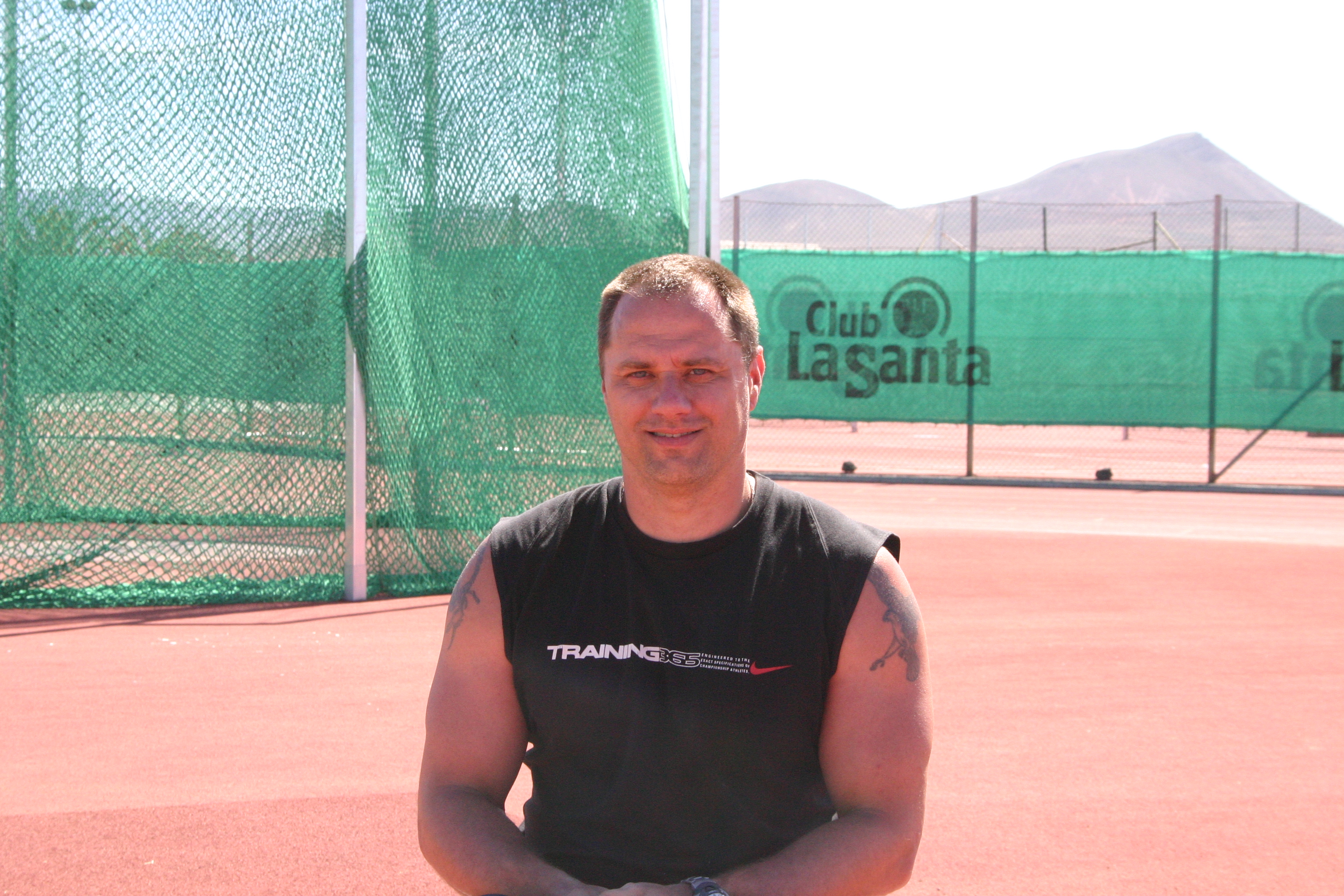
- Pieter

Personal information
- Full name: Pieter Gruijters
- Nationality: Dutch
- Born: 24 July 1967 (age 59) Helmond

Sport
- Country: Netherlands
- Sport: Paralympic athletics

Achievements and titles
- Paralympic finals: 2004 Athens; 2008 Beijing
Medal record
Track and field (P56)
Representing Netherlands
Paralympic Games
| Gold medal – first place | 2008 Beijing | Javelin - F55-56 |
| Silver medal – second place | 2004 Athens | Pentathlon - P54-58 |
| Silver medal – second place | 2004 Athens | Javelin - F55-56 |

Pieter Gruijters (born 24 July 1967) is a Paralympic athlete from Netherlands competing F56 seated throws and P56 pentathlon events.

He competed in the 2004 Summer Paralympics in Athens, Greece. There he won a silver medal in the men's Pentathlon - P54-58 event, a silver medal in the men's Javelin throw - F55-56 event and finished eleventh in the men's Shot put - F56 event. He also competed at the 2008 Summer Paralympics in Beijing, China. There he won a gold medal in the men's Javelin throw - F55-56 event and finished seventh in the men's Shot put - F55-56 event

He is world record holder in javelin for F56 classified athletes.

Awards
| Preceded by (Netherlands) Esther Vergeer | Dutch Disabled Sportsman / woman of the Year; 2006 | Succeeded by (Netherlands) Annette Roozen / Marion Nijhof |
