= Athletics at the 2000 Summer Paralympics – Men's 100 metres T36 =

Men's 100 metres T36 at the XI Paralympic Games
- Venue: Stadium Australia
- Competitors: 11 from 10 nations
- Winning time: 12.58

Medalists
| 1st place, gold medalist(s) | | So Wa Wai | Hong Kong |
| 2nd place, silver medalist(s) | | Serhiy Norenko | Ukraine |
| 3rd place, bronze medalist(s) | | Andriy Zhyltsov | Ukraine |

The men's 100 metres T36 took place in Stadium Australia.

There were two heats and one final round. The T36 is for athletes who have cerebral palsy or other coordination impairments.

== Heats ==
| Qualified for final round |

=== Heat 1 ===
| Rank | Athlete | Time | Notes |
|---|---|---|---|
| 1 | Fernando Gomez (ESP) | 13.39 | |
| 2 | Serhiy Norenko (UKR) | 13.58 | |
| 3 | Freeman Register (USA) | 13.68 | |
| 4 | Kim Du Chun (KOR) | 13.76 | |
| 5 | Kasfino Kamarulzaman (MAS) | 17.04 | |

=== Heat 2 ===
| Rank | Athlete | Time | Notes |
|---|---|---|---|
| 1 | So Wa Wai (HKG) | 12.75 | |
| 2 | Andriy Zhyltsov (UKR) | 13.35 | |
| 3 | Hassan Ali Abdalla Dalam (UAE) | 13.46 | |
| 4 | Azman Yusof (SGP) | 13.96 | |
| 5 | Alessandro Marinelli (GER) | 15.15 | |
| 6 | Clayton Johnson (AUS) | 19.79 | |

== Final round ==
| Rank | Athlete | Time | Notes |
|---|---|---|---|
| 1st place, gold medalist(s) | So Wa Wai (HKG) | 12.58 | |
| 2nd place, silver medalist(s) | Serhiy Norenko (UKR) | 12.93 | |
| 3rd place, bronze medalist(s) | Andriy Zhyltsov (UKR) | 13.08 | |
| 4 | Fernando Gomez (ESP) | 13.36 | |
| 5 | Hassan Ali Abdalla Dalam (UAE) | 13.38 | |
| 6 | Kim Du Chun (KOR) | 13.47 | |
| 7 | Azman Yusof (SGP) | 13.79 | |
| 8 | Freeman Register (USA) | 13.88 | |
