= Ukraine at the 2004 Summer Paralympics =

- IPC code: UKR
- NPC: National Sports Committee for the Disabled of Ukraine
- Website: www.paralympic.org.ua

in Athens
- Competitors: 90 in 9 sports
- Medals Ranked 6th: Gold 24 Silver 12 Bronze 19 Total 55

Summer Paralympics appearances (overview)
- 1996; 2000; 2004; 2008; 2012; 2016; 2020; 2024

Other related appearances
- Soviet Union (1988); Unified Team (1992)

Ukraine sent a delegation of 90 athletes to the 2004 Summer Paralympics, covering nine sports.

== Medallists ==
Medal	Name	Sport	Event
Gold	Andriy Zhyltsov	Athletics	Men's 100 m T36
Gold	Oleksandr Driha	Athletics	Men's 400 m T37
Gold	Oleksandr Driha	Athletics	Men's 800 m T37
Gold	Anton Skachkov	Athletics	Men's long jump F46
Gold	Anton Skachkov	Athletics	Men's triple jump F46
Gold	Oleksandr Doroshenko	Athletics	Men's shot put F38
Gold	Alexander Yasinovyi	Athletics	Men's discus throw F13
Gold	Oleksandr Doroshenko	Athletics	Men's discus throw F38
Gold	Oksana Krechunyak	Athletics	Women's 100 m T37
Gold	Yevhen Zhuchynin; Ihor Kosenko; Volodymyr Antonyuk; Volodymyr Kabanov; Serhiy Vakulenko; Andriy Roztoka; Andriy Tsukanov; Anatoliy Shevchyk; Denys Ponomaryov; Taras Dutko; Sergiy Babiy; Vitaliy Trushev	Football 7-a-side	Men's team
Gold	Lidiya Solovyova	Powerlifting	Women's 40 kg
Gold	Dmytro Aleksyeyev	Swimming	Men's 50 m freestyle S12
Gold	Viktor Smyrnov	Swimming	Men's 100 m freestyle S11
Gold	Viktor Smyrnov	Swimming	Men's 400 m freestyle S11
Gold	Viktor Smyrnov	Swimming	Men's 100 m butterfly S11
Gold	Andriy Kalyna	Swimming	Men's 100 m breaststroke SB8
Gold	Oleksandr Mashchenko	Swimming	Men's 100 m breaststroke SB11
Gold	Dmytro Aleksyeyev	Swimming	Men's 100 m breaststroke SB12
Gold	Viktor Smyrnov	Swimming	Men's 100 m backstroke S11
Gold	Viktor Smyrnov	Swimming	Men's 200 m individual medley SM11
Gold	Dmytro Kuzmin; Sergiy Demchuk; Sergiy Klippert; Dmytro Aleksyeyev	Swimming	Men's 4 × 100 m freestyle relay (49 pts)
Gold	Sergiy Klippert; Oleksandr Mashchenko; Sergiy Demchuk; Dmytro Aleksyeyev	Swimming	Men's 4 × 100 m medley relay (49 pts)
Gold	Olena Akopyan	Swimming	Women's 50 m freestyle S5
Gold	Andriy Komar	Wheelchair fencing	Men's épée individual B
Silver	Andriy Zhyltsov	Athletics	Men's 200 m T36
Silver	Oleksandr Driha	Athletics	Men's 1500 m T37
Silver	Alexander Yasinovyi	Athletics	Men's shot put F13
Silver	Tetyana Yakybchuk	Athletics	Women's shot put F32-34/52/53
Silver	Dmytro Kryzhanovskyy	Swimming	Men's 50 m freestyle S5
Silver	Dmytro Kryzhanovskyy	Swimming	Men's 100 m freestyle S5
Silver	Dmytro Aleksyeyev	Swimming	Men's 100 m freestyle S12
Silver	Viktor Smyrnov	Swimming	Men's 100 m breaststroke SB11
Silver	Sergiy Klippert	Swimming	Men's 100 m backstroke S12
Silver	Andriy Kalyna	Swimming	Men's 200 m individual medley SM9
Silver	Olena Akopyan	Swimming	Women's 200 m freestyle S5
Silver	Olena Akopyan	Swimming	Women's 50 m butterfly S5
Bronze	Oleksandr Ivanyukhin	Athletics	Men's 200 m T11
Bronze	Andriy Onufriyenko; Serhiy Norenko; Oleksandr Driha; Andriy Zhyltsov	Athletics	Men's 4 × 100 m relay T35–38
Bronze	Oleksandr Driha; Serhiy Norenko; Andriy Onufriyenko; Andriy Zhyltsov	Athletics	Men's 4 × 400 m relay T35–38
Bronze	Ivan Kytsenko	Athletics	Men's triple jump F12
Bronze	Volodymyr Piddubnyy	Athletics	Men's shot put F11
Bronze	Oleksandr Doroshenko	Athletics	Men's javelin throw F36/38
Bronze	Inna Dyachenko	Athletics	Women's 400 m T38
Bronze	Alla Malchyk	Athletics	Women's shot put F35/36
Bronze	Ihor Zasyadkovych	Judo	Men's extra-lightweight (60 kg)
Bronze	Olena Kiseolar	Powerlifting	Women's 48 kg
Bronze	Viktor Smyrnov	Swimming	Men's 50 m freestyle S11
Bronze	Yuriy Andryushin	Swimming	Men's 50 m butterfly S7
Bronze	Dmytro Kuzmin	Swimming	Men's 100 m breaststroke SB12
Bronze	Oleksandr Mashchenko	Swimming	Men's 200 m individual medley SM11
Bronze	Yuliya Volkova	Swimming	Women's 50 m freestyle S12
Bronze	Olena Akopyan	Swimming	Women's 100 m freestyle S5
Bronze	Yuliya Volkova	Swimming	Women's 400 m freestyle S12
Bronze	Yuliya Volkova	Swimming	Women's 100 m breaststroke SB12
Bronze	Andriy Komar	Wheelchair fencing	Men's foil individual B

== Sports ==
=== Archery ===
==== Men ====
Athlete	Event	Ranking round		Round of 32	Round of 16	Quarterfinals	Semifinals	Finals	
Athlete	Event	Score	Seed	Opposition score	Opposition score	Opposition score	Opposition score	Opposition score	Rank
Serhiy Atamanenko	Men's individual standing	591	11	Roumeliotis (GRE); W 147–116	Bukansit (POL); W 150–143	Lyocsa (SVK); L 86–95	Did not advance		
Yuriy Kopiy	Men's individual standing	578	14	Martinez (VEN); L 138–133	Did not advance				
Roman Hutnyk	Men's individual W2	557	27	Sidik (MAS); L 145–153	Did not advance				
Serhiy Atamanenko; Roman Hutnyk; Yuriy Kopiy	Men's teams open	1726	11	N/A	Germany (GER); W 229–221	Japan (JPN); L 206–226	Did not advance		

==== Women ====
Athlete	Event	Ranking round		Round of 32	Round of 16	Quarterfinals	Semifinals	Finals	
Athlete	Event	Score	Seed	Opposition score	Opposition score	Opposition score	Opposition score	Opposition score	Rank
Bohdana Nikitenko	Women's individual standing	546	8	N/A	Panmai (THA); L 116–135	Did not advance			
Olena Struk	Women's individual standing	516	13	N/A	Lee (KOR); L 127–136	Did not advance			
Iryna Terletska	Women's individual W1/W2	550	6	N/A	Droste (GER); W 141–120	Ko (KOR); L 92–98	Did not advance		
Bohdana Nikitenko; Olena Struk; Iryna Terletska	Women's teams open	1612	7	N/A		South Korea (KOR); L 198–201	Did not advance		

=== Athletics ===
==== Men's track ====
Athlete	Class	Event	Heats		Semifinal		Final	
Athlete	Class	Event	Result	Rank	Result	Rank	Result	Rank
Andriy Danylov	T42	100 m	N/A				13.32	5
Andriy Danylov	T42	200 m	N/A				28.23	7
Oleksandr Driha	T37	400 m	N/A				52.70 WR	1st place, gold medalist(s)
Oleksandr Driha	T37	800 m	2:14.12	2 Q	N/A		2:03.18	1st place, gold medalist(s)
Oleksandr Driha	T37	1500 m	N/A				4:25.42	2nd place, silver medalist(s)
Oleksandr Ivanyukhin	T11	100 m	11.82	6 q	11.80	4 q	11.76	4
Oleksandr Ivanyukhin	T11	200 m	23.86	2 Q	23.87	3 Q	23.37	3rd place, bronze medalist(s)
Oleksandr Ivanyukhin	T11	400 m	54.19	4 q	N/A		52.85	4
Serhiy Norenko	T36	400 m	59.06	2 Q	N/A		58.63	5
Andriy Onufriyenko	T38	100 m	11.83	3 Q	N/A		11.82	6
Andriy Onufriyenko	T38	200 m	23.78	4 Q	N/A		23.57	4
Andriy Onufriyenko	T38	400 m	53.15	4 Q	N/A		53.12	4
Igor Pashchenko	T12	100 m	11.73	20	Did not advance			
Igor Pashchenko	T12	200 m	23.51	13	Did not advance			
Andriy Zhyltsov	T36	100 m	12.76	2 Q	N/A		12.49 PR	1st place, gold medalist(s)
Andriy Zhyltsov	T36	200 m	N/A				25.75	2nd place, silver medalist(s)
Oleksandr Driha; Serhiy Norenko; Andriy Onufriyenko; Andriy Zhyltsov	T35–38	4 × 100 m relay	N/A				47.52	3rd place, bronze medalist(s)
Oleksandr Driha; Serhiy Norenko; Andriy Onufriyenko; Andriy Zhyltsov	T35–38	4 × 400 m relay	N/A				3:46.78	3rd place, bronze medalist(s)

==== Men's field ====
Athlete	Class	Event	Final		
Athlete	Class	Event	Result	Points	Rank
Oleksandr Doroshenko	F38	Discus	44.58 WR	-	1st place, gold medalist(s)
Oleksandr Doroshenko	F38	Javelin	51.37	-	3rd place, bronze medalist(s)
Oleksandr Doroshenko	F38	Shot put	14.87 WR	-	1st place, gold medalist(s)
Igor Gorbenko	F12	Long jump	6.70	-	7
Igor Gorbenko	F12	Triple jump	13.66	-	7
Sergiy Kolos	F35	Discus	35.13	-	6
Sergiy Kolos	F35	Javelin	36.73	-	6
Ivan Kytsenko	F12	Long jump	6.56	-	8
Ivan Kytsenko	F12	Triple jump	14.45	-	3rd place, bronze medalist(s)
Vasyl Lishchynskyy	F12	Discus	43.21	-	4
Vasyl Lishchynskyy	F13	Shot put	NMR		
Roman Mesyk	F12	Javelin	39.01	-	13
Roman Mesyk	P13	Pentathlon	2274		5
Serhiy Norenko	F36–38	Long jump	4.90	967	4
Volodymyr Piddubnyy	F11	Shot put	12.23	-	3rd place, bronze medalist(s)
Anton Skachkov	F46	Long jump	7.16 WR	-	1st place, gold medalist(s)
Anton Skachkov	F46	Triple jump	14.12	-	1st place, gold medalist(s)
Alexander Yasinovyi	F13	Discus	53.54	-	1st place, gold medalist(s)
Alexander Yasinovyi	F13	Shot put	15.87	-	2nd place, silver medalist(s)
Andriy Zhyltsov	F36–38	Long jump	5.17	1033	4

==== Women's track ====
Athlete	Class	Event	Heats		Final	
Athlete	Class	Event	Result	Rank	Result	Rank
Inna Dyachenko	T38	400 m	N/A		1:07.49	3rd place, bronze medalist(s)
Svitlana Gorbenko	T13	100 m	N/A		14.10	8
Oksana Krechunyak	T37	100 m	N/A		14.39	1st place, gold medalist(s)
Oksana Krechunyak	T37	200 m	N/A		1:00.99	5
Tetyana Rudkivska	T46	200 m	28.37	10	Did not advance	
Tetyana Rudkivska	T46	400 m	1:04.65	7 q	1:04.12	6

==== Women's field ====
Athlete	Class	Event	Final		
Athlete	Class	Event	Result	Points	Rank
Svitlana Gorbenko	F13	Long jump	5.15	-	4
Alla Malchyk	F35/36	Shot put	8.90	1146	3rd place, bronze medalist(s)
Alla Malchyk	F35/36/38	Discus	22.12	1109	5
Viktoria Shayer	F35/36/38	Discus	21.42	1208	4
Viktoria Shayer	F35/36/38	Javelin	14.87	843	13
Tetyana Yakybchuk	F32-34/51-53	Discus	14.20	1038	4
Tetyana Yakybchuk	F32-34/52/53	Javelin	11.61	1097	6
Tetyana Yakybchuk	F32-34/52/53	Shot put	6.43 WR	1186	2nd place, silver medalist(s)
Viktoriya Yasevych	F35-38	Javelin	17.32	781	14
Viktoriya Yasevych	F37	Discus	24.27	704	5
Viktoriya Yasevych	F37/38	Shot put	8.96	973	5

=== Football 7-a-side ===
==== Players ====
- Yevhan Zhuchynin
- Ihor Kosenko
- Volodymyr Antonyuk
- Volodymyr Kabanov
- Serhiy Vakulenko
- Andriy Roztoka
- Andriy Tsukanov
- Anatoliy Shevchyk
- Denys Ponomaryov
- Taras Dutko
- Sergiy Babiy
- Vitaliy Trushev

==== Results ====
Game	Match	Score	Rank
1	Ukraine vs. Argentina (ARG)	2–2	1 Q
2	Ukraine vs. Iran (IRI)	6–2	1 Q
3	Ukraine vs. Ireland (IRL)	6–0	1 Q
Semifinals	Ukraine vs. Russia (RUS)	4–1	W
Gold medal final	Ukraine vs. Brazil (BRA)	4–1	1st place, gold medalist(s)

=== Judo ===
Athlete	Event	Preliminary	Quarterfinals	Semifinals	Repechage round 1	Repechage round 2	Final/ Bronze medal contest
Athlete	Event	Opposition Result	Opposition Result	Opposition Result	Opposition Result	Opposition Result	Opposition Result
Mykola Lyvytskyy	Men's 100 kg	Bye	Tenorio (BRA); L 0000S–1001	N/A	Le Meaux (FRA); L 0010K–0100C	Did not advance	
Sergiy Karpenyuk	Men's 66 kg	Dae (KOR); L 0102H–1000	Did not advance				
Oleksandr Pominov	Men's 81 kg	Bye	Vincze (HUN); L 0000–1000	N/A	Poli (ITA); W 1010–0000	Junk (GER); L 0001–1000	Did not advance
Sergiy Sydrorenko	Men's 73 kg	Jackson (GBR); W 0010–0001	Amaral (BRA); L 0100–1000	N/A		Rollo (FRA); W 1011S–0001S	Moore (USA); L 0000–0200
Ihor Zasyadkovych	Men's 60 kg	Michurin (RUS); W 0021–0000	Hirose (JPN); L 0000S–1022	N/A		Diaz (ARG); W 0131S–0001C	Chung (TPE); W 1000–0000 (bronze)

=== Powerlifting ===
==== Men ====
Athlete	Event	Result	Rank
Andriy Barybin	82.5 kg	180	11

==== Women ====
Athlete	Event	Result	Rank
Tetyana Frolova	+82.5 kg	132.5	4
Olena Kiseolar	48 kg	95	3rd place, bronze medalist(s)
Tamara Kulynych	44 kg	82.5	4
Lyudmyla Osmanova	60 kg	107.5	5
Lyubov Semenyuk	75 kg	NMR	
Lidiya Solovyova	40 kg	105 WR	1st place, gold medalist(s)

=== Swimming ===
==== Men ====
Athlete	Class	Event	Heats		Final	
Athlete	Class	Event	Result	Rank	Result	Rank
Dmytro Aleksyeyev	S12	50 m freestyle	25.74	3 Q	24.80 WR	1st place, gold medalist(s)
Dmytro Aleksyeyev	S12	100 m freestyle	56.72	3 Q	55.35	2nd place, silver medalist(s)
Dmytro Aleksyeyev	S12	100 m backstroke	1:06.29	3 Q	1:05.01	4
Dmytro Aleksyeyev	SB12	100 m breaststroke	1:11.49	1 Q	1:10.99	1st place, gold medalist(s)
Yuriy Andryushin	S7	50 m freestyle	30.46	5 Q	30.74	6
Yuriy Andryushin	S7	100 m freestyle	DSQ		Did not advance	
Yuriy Andryushin	S7	50 m butterfly	32.91	2 Q	33.12	3rd place, bronze medalist(s)
Yuriy Andryushin	SM7	200 m individual medley	2:57.54	7 Q	2:59.41	8
Sergiy Demchuk	S12	50 m freestyle	26.83	9	Did not advance	
Sergiy Demchuk	S12	100 m freestyle	59.20	10	Did not advance	
Sergiy Demchuk	S12	100 m butterfly	1:05.12	7 Q	1:05.58	7
Anton Ganzha	S13	50 m freestyle	26.97	7 Q	26.70	6
Anton Ganzha	S13	100 m freestyle	1:00.31	8 Q	1:01.98	8
Anton Ganzha	S13	100 m backstroke	1:09.05	3 Q	1:08.35	5
Anton Ganzha	SM13	200 m individual medley	2:37.54	8 Q	2:37.74	8
Andriy Kalyna	S9	50 m freestyle	27.65	6 Q	27.44	4
Andriy Kalyna	S9	100 m freestyle	1:00.37	7 Q	59.46	4
Andriy Kalyna	SB8	100 m breaststroke	1:11.02 PR	1 Q	1:10.40 WR	1st place, gold medalist(s)
Andriy Kalyna	SM9	200 m individual medley	2:27.04	3 Q	2:22.13	2nd place, silver medalist(s)
Sergiy Klippert	S12	400 m freestyle	4:36.23	4 Q	4:34.71	5
Sergiy Klippert	S12	100 m backstroke	1:04.88	1 Q	1:04.01	2nd place, silver medalist(s)
Sergiy Klippert	SB12	100 m breaststroke	1:15.46	6 Q	1:14.03	4
Sergiy Klippert	SM12	200 m individual medley	2:23.72	4 Q	2:20.10	4
Dmytro Korneyev	S13	50 m freestyle	27.71	13	Did not advance	
Dmytro Korneyev	S13	100 m freestyle	1:02.93	14	Did not advance	
Dmytro Korneyev	S13	100 m butterfly	1:12.60	10	Did not advance	
Andriy Kovalyov	S10	50 m freestyle	27.81	16	Did not advance	
Andriy Kovalyov	SB9	100 m breaststroke	1:18.79	12	Did not advance	
Dmytro Kryzhanovskyy	S5	50 m freestyle	34.54	1 Q	33.63	2nd place, silver medalist(s)
Dmytro Kryzhanovskyy	S5	100 m freestyle	1:15.66 PR	1 Q	1:16.29	2nd place, silver medalist(s)
Dmytro Kryzhanovskyy	S5	50 m butterfly	39.95	3 Q	41.99	5
Dmytro Kuzmin	S12	50 m freestyle	26.36	6 Q	26.00	5
Dmytro Kuzmin	S12	100 m freestyle	57.49	4 Q	56.13	4
Dmytro Kuzmin	S12	400 m freestyle	4:37.51	5 Q	4:30.61	4
Dmytro Kuzmin	SB12	100 m breaststroke	1:15.13	5 Q	1:13.69	3rd place, bronze medalist(s)
Dmytro Kuzmin	SM12	200 m individual medley	2:25.69	5 Q	2:22.26	5
Oleksandr Mashchenko	S11	50 m freestyle	29.60	8 Q	29.38	8
Oleksandr Mashchenko	S11	100 m backstroke	1:16.28	4 Q	1:16.84	7
Oleksandr Mashchenko	S11	100 m butterfly	1:19.70	6 Q	DNS	
Oleksandr Mashchenko	SB11	100 m breaststroke	1:13.23	1 Q	1:10.53 WR	1st place, gold medalist(s)
Oleksandr Mashchenko	SM11	200 m individual medley	N/A		2:36.71	3rd place, bronze medalist(s)
Oleg Rabyshkov	S13	100 m butterfly	1:14.84	12	Did not advance	
Oleg Rabyshkov	SB13	100 m breaststroke	1:15.98	3 Q	1:15.45	6
Oleg Rabyshkov	SM13	200 m individual medley	2:50.32	11	Did not advance	
Andriy Sirovatchenko	S9	50 m freestyle	27.86	7 Q	27.93	8
Andriy Sirovatchenko	S9	100 m freestyle	1:02.70	18	Did not advance	
Andriy Sirovatchenko	S9	100 m backstroke	1:13.52	17	Did not advance	
Viktor Smyrnov	S11	50 m freestyle	27.90	2 Q	27.27	3rd place, bronze medalist(s)
Viktor Smyrnov	S11	100 m freestyle	1:02.42	3 Q	1:00.79	1st place, gold medalist(s)
Viktor Smyrnov	S11	400 m freestyle	5:00.38	2 Q	4:44.79	1st place, gold medalist(s)
Viktor Smyrnov	S11	100 m backstroke	1:12.51	1 Q	1:11.29	1st place, gold medalist(s)
Viktor Smyrnov	S11	100 m butterfly	1:09.16	2 Q	1:06.34	1st place, gold medalist(s)
Viktor Smyrnov	SB11	100 m breaststroke	1:18.20	2	1:17.98	2nd place, silver medalist(s)
Viktor Smyrnov	SM11	200 m individual medley	N/A		2:28.47	1st place, gold medalist(s)
Taras Yastremskyy	S9	50 m freestyle	28.08	10	Did not advance	
Taras Yastremskyy	S9	100 m freestyle	59.72	3 Q	1:00.54	8
Taras Yastremskyy	S9	400 m freestyle	4:41.28	10	Did not advance	
Taras Yastremskyy	SM9	200 m individual medley	2:46.25	12	Did not advance	
Denys Zhumela	S2	50 m freestyle	1:17.69	8 Q	1:17.31	7
Denys Zhumela	S2	100 m freestyle	2:40.48	5 Q	2:39.80	4
Denys Zhumela	S2	200 m freestyle	5:34.99	3 Q	5:33.02	5
Denys Zhumela	S2	50 m backstroke	1:16.01	5 Q	1:17.88	7
Yuriy Andryushin; Andriy Kalyna; Andriy Sirovatchenko; Taras Yastremskyy	N/A	4 × 100 m freestyle relay (34 pts)	4:22.35	9	Did not advance	
Yuriy Andryushin; Andriy Kalyna; Andriy Sirovatchenko; Taras Yastremskyy	N/A	4 × 100 m medley relay (34 pts)	4:38.78	5 Q	4:37.82	6
Dmytro Aleksyeyev; Sergiy Demchuk; Sergiy Klippert; Dmytro Kuzmin	N/A	4 × 100 m freestyle relay (49 pts)	N/A		3:45.97 WR	1st place, gold medalist(s)
Dmytro Aleksyeyev; Sergiy Demchuk; Sergiy Klippert; Dmytro Kuzmin	N/A	4 × 100 m medley relay (49 pts)	N/A		4:13.65 WR	1st place, gold medalist(s)

==== Women ====
Athlete	Class	Event	Heats		Final	
Athlete	Class	Event	Result	Rank	Result	Rank
Olena Akopyan	S5	50 m freestyle	37.94	2 Q	37.26	1st place, gold medalist(s)
Olena Akopyan	S5	100 m freestyle	1:21.01	2 Q	1:21.33	3rd place, bronze medalist(s)
Olena Akopyan	S5	200 m freestyle	2:59.35	2 Q	2:53.86	2nd place, silver medalist(s)
Olena Akopyan	S5	50 m butterfly	N/A		46.57	2nd place, silver medalist(s)
Sofiya Avramova	S4	50 m backstroke	1:00.51	5 Q	1:01.27	5
Sofiya Avramova	S4	50 m butterfly	N/A		1:11.74	4
Sofiya Avramova	SB3	50 m breaststroke	1:16.11	8 Q	1:15.05	7
Sofiya Avramova	SM4	150 m individual medley	3:24.27	3 Q	3:29.69	5
Maryna Klemyashova	SB5	100 m breaststroke	N/A		DNF	
Valentyna Riznychenko	S6	50 m freestyle	39.49	4 Q	39.75	7
Valentyna Riznychenko	S6	100 m freestyle	1:31.09	11	Did not advance	
Yuliya Volkova	S12	50 m freestyle	29.60	3 Q	29.14	3rd place, bronze medalist(s)
Yuliya Volkova	S12	100 m freestyle	1:05.35	4 Q	1:04.63	5
Yuliya Volkova	S12	400 m freestyle	N/A		5:02.42	3rd place, bronze medalist(s)
Yuliya Volkova	SB12	100 m breaststroke	1:25.82	4	1:25.17	3rd place, bronze medalist(s)
Yuliya Volkova	SM12	200 m individual medley	2:54.71	7 Q	2:59.42	7

=== Table tennis ===
Athlete	Event	Preliminaries				Quarterfinals	Semifinals	Final / BM	
Athlete	Event	Opposition Result	Opposition Result	Opposition Result	Rank	Opposition Result	Opposition Result	Opposition Result	Rank
Dmytro Bidnyy	Men's singles 7	Messi (FRA); L 1–3	Meyer (GER); L 1–3	Jurasz (POL); L 0–3	4	Did not advance			
Mikhailo Popov	Men's singles 7	Wollmert (GER); L 1–3	Qin (CHN); L 1–3	Loennberg (SWE); W 3–1	3	Did not advance			
Dmytro Bidnyy; Mikhailo Popov	Men's team 6–7	Germany (GER); L 0–3	Poland (POL); L 1–3	N/A	3	Did not advance			

=== Volleyball ===
The women's volleyball team didn't win any medals: they were 6th out of six teams.

==== Players ====
- Oleksandra Granovska
- Galyna Kuznetsova
- Lyubov Lomakina
- Inna Osetynska
- Nataliya Parshutina
- Tetyana Podzyuban
- Ilona Yudina
- Olena Yurkovska

==== Results ====
Game	Match	Score	Rank
1	Ukraine vs. China (CHN)	0–3	6
2	Ukraine vs. Netherlands (NED)	0–3	6
3	Ukraine vs. United States (USA)	2–3	6
4	Ukraine vs. Slovenia (SLO)	0–3	6
5	Ukraine vs. Finland (FIN)	2–3	6
5th-6th classification	Ukraine vs. Finland (FIN)	1–3	6

=== Wheelchair fencing ===
==== Men ====
Athlete	Event	Qualification			Round of 16	Quarterfinal	Semifinal	Final / BM	
Athlete	Event	Opposition	Score	Rank	Opposition Score	Opposition Score	Opposition Score	Opposition Score	Rank
Andriy Komar	Men's épée B	Chin (HKG)	L 3-5	2 Q	Hisakawa (JPN); W 15–9	Shenkevych (UKR); W 15–10	Ming (HKG); W 15–5	Wysmierski (POL); W 15–9	1st place, gold medalist(s)
Andriy Komar	Men's épée B	Hoon (KOR)	W 5-2	2 Q	Hisakawa (JPN); W 15–9	Shenkevych (UKR); W 15–10	Ming (HKG); W 15–5	Wysmierski (POL); W 15–9	1st place, gold medalist(s)
Andriy Komar	Men's épée B	Sarri (ITA)	W 5-2	2 Q	Hisakawa (JPN); W 15–9	Shenkevych (UKR); W 15–10	Ming (HKG); W 15–5	Wysmierski (POL); W 15–9	1st place, gold medalist(s)
Andriy Komar	Men's épée B	Hisakawa (JPN)	W 5-2	2 Q	Hisakawa (JPN); W 15–9	Shenkevych (UKR); W 15–10	Ming (HKG); W 15–5	Wysmierski (POL); W 15–9	1st place, gold medalist(s)
Andriy Komar	Men's épée B	Soler (ESP)	W 5-1	2 Q	Hisakawa (JPN); W 15–9	Shenkevych (UKR); W 15–10	Ming (HKG); W 15–5	Wysmierski (POL); W 15–9	1st place, gold medalist(s)
Andriy Komar	Men's foil B	Francois (FRA)	L 2-5	4 Q	Szekeres (HUN); W 15–11	Mari (ITA); W 15–10	Czop (POL); L 10–15	Rodgers (USA); W 15–11	3rd place, bronze medalist(s)
Andriy Komar	Men's foil B	Alsaedi (KUW)	L 1–5	4 Q	Szekeres (HUN); W 15–11	Mari (ITA); W 15–10	Czop (POL); L 10–15	Rodgers (USA); W 15–11	3rd place, bronze medalist(s)
Andriy Komar	Men's foil B	Liang (CHN)	W 5–4	4 Q	Szekeres (HUN); W 15–11	Mari (ITA); W 15–10	Czop (POL); L 10–15	Rodgers (USA); W 15–11	3rd place, bronze medalist(s)
Andriy Komar	Men's foil B	Ming (HKG)	W 5–1	4 Q	Szekeres (HUN); W 15–11	Mari (ITA); W 15–10	Czop (POL); L 10–15	Rodgers (USA); W 15–11	3rd place, bronze medalist(s)
Serhiy Shenkevych	Men's épée B	Liang (CHN)	L 1–5	2 Q	Sarri (ITA); W 15–5	Komar (UKR); L 10–15	Did not advance		
Serhiy Shenkevych	Men's épée B	Rodgers (USA)	W 5–4	2 Q	Sarri (ITA); W 15–5	Komar (UKR); L 10–15	Did not advance		
Serhiy Shenkevych	Men's épée B	Wysmierski (POL)	W 5–3	2 Q	Sarri (ITA); W 15–5	Komar (UKR); L 10–15	Did not advance		
Serhiy Shenkevych	Men's épée B	Francois (FRA)	W 5–2	2 Q	Sarri (ITA); W 15–5	Komar (UKR); L 10–15	Did not advance		
Serhiy Shenkevych	Men's épée B	Heaton (GBR)	W 5-3	2 Q	Sarri (ITA); W 15–5	Komar (UKR); L 10–15	Did not advance		
Serhiy Shenkevych	Men's foil B	Hung (HKG)	L 3–5	Liang (CHN); W 15–14	Czop (POL); L 6–15	Did not advance			
Serhiy Shenkevych	Men's foil B	Rodgers (USA)	L 1–5	Liang (CHN); W 15–14	Czop (POL); L 6–15	Did not advance			
Serhiy Shenkevych	Men's foil B	Lewonowski (POL)	W 5–1	Liang (CHN); W 15–14	Czop (POL); L 6–15	Did not advance			
Serhiy Shenkevych	Men's foil B	Hisakawa (JPN)	W 5–1	Liang (CHN); W 15–14	Czop (POL); L 6–15	Did not advance			

==== Women ====
Athlete	Event	Qualification			Round of 16	Quarterfinal	Semifinal	Final / BM	
Athlete	Event	Opposition	Score	Rank	Opposition Score	Opposition Score	Opposition Score	Opposition Score	Rank
Iryna Lykyanenko	Women's épée	Wyrzykowska (POL)	L 0–5	3 Q	Palfi (HUN); L 13–15	Did not advance			
Iryna Lykyanenko	Women's épée	Vettraino (ITA)	L 2–5	3 Q	Palfi (HUN); L 13–15	Did not advance			
Iryna Lykyanenko	Women's épée	Hassen Bey (ESP)	W 5–4	3 Q	Palfi (HUN); L 13–15	Did not advance			
Iryna Lykyanenko	Women's épée	Masciotra (ARG)	W 5–1	3 Q	Palfi (HUN); L 13–15	Did not advance			
Iryna Lykyanenko	Women's foil B	Chong (HKG)	L 1–5	4	Did not advance				
Iryna Lykyanenko	Women's foil B	Hassen Bey (ESP)	L 1–5	4	Did not advance				
Iryna Lykyanenko	Women's foil B	Wyrzykowska (POL)	L 0–5	4	Did not advance				
Iryna Lykyanenko	Women's foil B	Masciotra (ARG)	W 5–3	4	Did not advance				

== See also ==
- 2004 Summer Paralympics
- Ukraine at the Paralympics
- Ukraine at the 2004 Summer Olympics
