= Mohammed Dif =

Moroccan paralympic athlete

Medal record

Track and field (athletics)

Representing Morocco

Paralympic Games
Silver medal – second place	2004 Athens	Long Jump - F46

Mohammed Dif is a paralympic athlete from Morocco competing mainly in category F46 long jump events.

Mohammed won a silver medal in the long jump at the 2004 Summer Paralympics in Athens, Greece.
