= Dmytro Kuzmin =

Ukrainian Paralympic swimmer

Medal record

Swimming

Representing Ukraine

Paralympic Games
Gold medal – first place	2004 Athens	4x100 metre freestyle - 49 pts
Bronze medal – third place	2004 Athens	100 metre breaststroke - SB12

Dmytro Kuzmin (Ukrainian: Дмитро Кузьмін) is a Paralympic swimmer from Ukraine competing mainly in category SB12 events.

Kuzmin is from Poltava. He competed as part of the Ukrainian swimming team at the 2004 Summer Paralympics and was part of the 4 × 100 m freestyle team that won gold in the 49pts race in a new world-record time. In his individual events he won a bronze in the 100m breastroke, finished fifth in the 50m freestyle, fourth in the 400m freestyle, fifth in the 200m medley, and failed to reach the final of the 100m freestyle. He later began skiing.
