= Anton Skachkov =

Ukrainian Paralympic athlete

Medal record

Track and field (athletics)

Representing Ukraine

Paralympic Games
| Gold medal – first place | 2004 Athens | Long Jump - F46 |
| Gold medal – first place | 2004 Athens | Triple Jump - F46 |
| Silver medal – second place | 2000 Sydney | Long Jump - F46 |
| Silver medal – second place | 2000 Sydney | Triple Jump - F46 |

Anton Skachkov (Ukrainian: Антон Олександрович Скачков; born 5 July 1979) is a Paralympian athlete from Ukraine competing mainly in category F46 long and triple jump events.

He finished the Cherkasy National University (2005).

Anton competed in the 2000 Summer Paralympics winning silver in both the long jump and triple jump. In the 2008 Summer Paralympics he went better in both events winning gold in the long jump and triple jump.
