= Serhiy Norenko =

Ukrainian Paralympic athlete

Medal record

Paralympic athletics

Representing Ukraine

Paralympic Games
Silver medal – second place	2000 Sydney	100 metres - T36
Silver medal – second place	2000 Sydney	200 metres - T36
Bronze medal – third place	2000 Sydney	400 metres - T36
Bronze medal – third place	2004 Athens	4x100m - T35-38
Bronze medal – third place	2004 Athens	4x400m - T35-38

Serhiy Norenko (Ukrainian: Сергій Норенко) is a Paralympian athlete from Ukraine competing mainly in category T36 sprint events.

Norenko first competed in the Paralympics in 2000 where he competed in the 4 × 400 m as part of the Ukrainian team but it was in the individual events that he won medals, silver in both the 100m and 200m and bronze in the 400m. In 2004 it proved to be the relay events he would win medals in, both bronzes in the 4 × 100 m and 4 × 400 m, and failing to medal in the 400m or long jump.
