= Duan Qifeng =

Chinese track and field athlete

Personal information
- Born: January 20, 1973 (age 53) Handan, Hebei, China
Medal record
Representing China
Men's para-athletics
Paralympic Games
Gold medal – first place	2004 Athens	Triple jump F12
Gold medal – first place	2004 Athens	4×100 m T11–13
Bronze medal – third place	2004 Athens	Long jump F12
Men's athletics
Asian Games
Silver medal – second place	1998 Bangkok	Triple jump
Asian Championships
Gold medal – first place	1998 Fukuoka	Triple jump

Duan Qifeng (Chinese: 段岐峰, born 20 January 1973) is a Chinese male former track and field athlete who specialized in the triple jump. He set a lifetime best of 17.05 m (55 ft 11 1/4 in) in 1998, which ranked him 20th in the world that year.

Duan has had a vision impairment since a very young age, which allowed him to also compete in the Paralympics in category T12/F12 events.

== Career ==
His international career flourished in 1998, when he was gold medallist at the 1998 Asian Athletics Championships, silver medallist behind Sergey Arzamasov at the 1998 Asian Games, and a representative for Asia at the 1998 IAAF World Cup.

In the 1998 season he won the national title at the Chinese Athletics Championships with a mark of 17.05 m (55 ft 11 1/4 in) – the first athlete to jump over seventeen metres at the competition in eight years. He had been runner-up at the Chinese National Games for his native Hebei previously, finishing second to Zou Sixin in 1993 and Lao Jianfeng in 1997.

Duan Qifeng also competed in the 2004 Summer Paralympics where he won three medals. He won gold in the F12 triple jump and a bronze in the F12 long jump, he was also part of the gold medal-winning Chinese 4 × 100 m relay team.

== International competitions ==
Year	Competition	Venue	Position	Event	Notes
1992	World Junior Championships	Seoul, South Korea	8th	Triple jump	15.78 m
1998	Asian Championships	Fukuoka, Japan	1st	Triple jump	16.79 m
1998	World Cup	Johannesburg, South Africa	8th	Triple jump	14.09 m
1998	Asian Games	Bangkok, Thailand	2nd	Triple jump	16.98 m
2004	Summer Paralympics	Athens, Greece	1st	Triple jump F12	15.30 m
2004	Summer Paralympics	Athens, Greece	1st	4 × 100 m relay T12	43.16
2004	Summer Paralympics	Athens, Greece	3rd	Long jump F12	7.00 m

== National titles ==
- Chinese Athletics Championships
  - Triple jump: 1998
