= Mai Wen Jie =

Chinese Paralympic athlete

Medal record

Track and field (athletics)

Representing China

Paralympic Games
Silver medal – second place	2004 Athens	Triple Jump - F46

Mai Wen Jae is a paralympic athlete from China competing mainly in category F46 triple jump events.

Mai Wen Jae competed in the 2004 Summer Paralympics where he won a silver medal in the triple jump for F46 class athletes as well as running in the Chinese T42-46 4 × 100 m relay team.
