= Andriy Zhyltsov =

Ukrainian Paralympic athlete

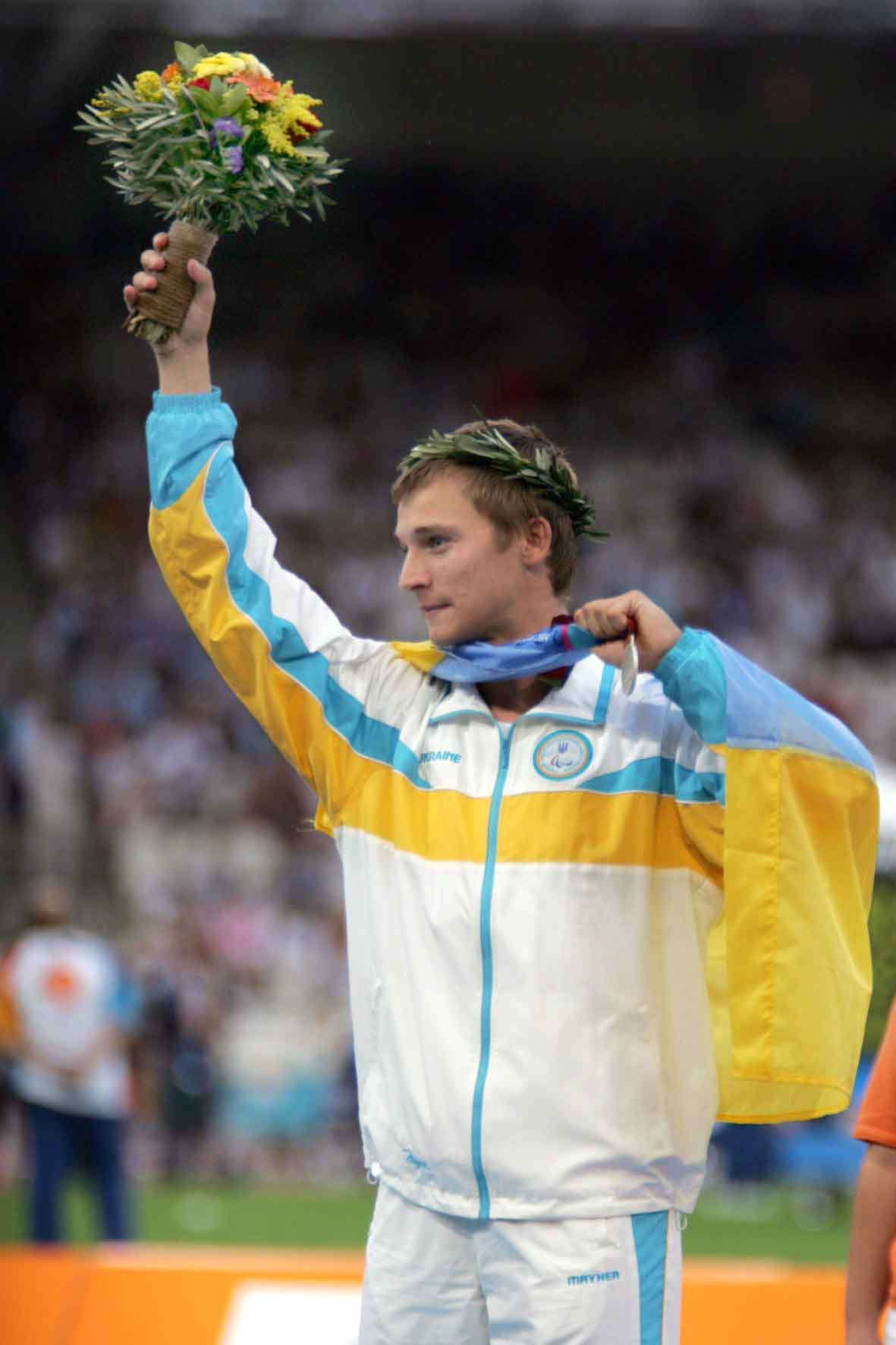

Medal record

Paralympic athletics

Representing Ukraine

Paralympic Games
Gold medal – first place	2004 Athens	100 metres - T36
Silver medal – second place	2004 Athens	200 metres - T36
Bronze medal – third place	2000 Sydney	100 metres - T36
Bronze medal – third place	2004 Athens	4x100m - T35-38
Bronze medal – third place	2004 Athens	4x400m - T35-38

Andriy Zhyltsov is a Paralympian athlete from Ukraine who took part in international competitions from 2000 to 2008.

https://www.paralympic.org/andriy-zhyltsov

== Biography ==
Andriy competed at both the 2000 and 2004 Summer Paralympics. In the first he competed in the 200m, 400m and 4x400m but it was in the 100m where he won his only medal, a bronze. In 2004 he had more success winning bronze in both the 4x100m and 4x400m relays, silver in the 200m and improved in the 100m to win the gold medal. He also competed in the long jump.
