= Oleksandr Driha =

Ukrainian Paralympic athlete

Medal record

Paralympic athletics

Representing Ukraine

Paralympic Games
Gold medal – first place	2004 Athens	400 metres - T37
Gold medal – first place	2004 Athens	800 metres - T37
Silver medal – second place	2004 Athens	1500 metres - T37
Bronze medal – third place	2004 Athens	4x100m - T35-38
Bronze medal – third place	2004 Athens	4x400m - T35-38

Oleksandr Driha, (Ukrainian: Олександр Дріга), is a Paralympian athlete from Ukraine competing mainly in category T37 middle-distance events.

Oleksandr competed in the 2004 Summer Paralympics where he won gold in both the 400m and 800m, silver in the 1500m and was a part of the bronze medal Ukrainian relay teams in the 4 × 100 m and 4 × 400 m.
