= Xu Hong Bai =

Chinese Paralympic athlete

Medal record

Paralympic athletics

Representing China

Paralympic Games
Silver medal – second place	2004 Athens	Discus Throw - F35/36/38

Xu Hong Bai is a Paralympian athlete from China competing mainly in category F35/36 shot put and discus events.

Xu competed in the 2004 Summer Paralympics in Athens where she won a silver in the F35/36/38 discus as well as competing in the F35/36 shot put.
