= Li Duan =

Chinese Paralympic long jumper

Personal information
- Born: 1 June 1978 (age 48) Changchun, China

Sport
- Sport: Paralympic athletics
Medal record
Track and field (F11)
Representing China
Paralympic Games
Gold medal – first place	2004 Athens	Triple Jump – F11
Gold medal – first place	2004 Athens	Long Jump – F11
Gold medal – first place	2008 Beijing	Long Jump – F11
Gold medal – first place	2008 Beijing	Triple Jump – F11
Silver medal – second place	2000 Sydney	Triple Jump – F11
Silver medal – second place	2012 London	Triple Jump – F11
Bronze medal – third place	2000 Sydney	Long Jump F11
Bronze medal – third place	2012 London	Long Jump F11
IPC World Championships
Gold medal – first place	2006 Assen	Long jump F11
Gold medal – first place	2011 Christchurch	Long Jump – F11
Gold medal – first place	2011 Christchurch	Triple Jump – F11
Silver medal – second place	2002 Lille	Long jump F11
Silver medal – second place	2006 Assen	Triple jump F11
Bronze medal – third place	2002 Lille	Triple jump F11
Bronze medal – third place	2011 Christchurch	Javelin throw F11
Asian Para Games
Gold medal – first place	2010 Guangzhou	Long jump F11

Li Duan (Chinese: 李端; pinyin: Lǐ Duān; born 1978) is a Chinese Paralympic long jumper F11. He became blind after an explosion on 11 September 1996. Before that, he was a professional basketball player who played for the Chinese Basketball Association team Shenyang Army during the 1995–96 CBA season.

He competed in the 2000 Summer Paralympics in Sydney, Australia. There, he won a silver medal in the men's Triple jump F11 event, a bronze medal in the men's Long jump F11 event and finished seventh in the men's Javelin throw F11 event. He also competed at the 2004 Summer Paralympics in Athens, Greece. There he won a gold medal in the men's Triple jump F11 event, a gold medal in the men's Long jump F11 event and finished fourth in the men's Javelin throw F11 event. At the 2008 Summer Paralympics in Beijing, China, he won gold medals in the men's Long jump F11 and Triple jump F11 events. He broke the Triple Jump F11 world record in the process. At the 2012 Summer Paralympics he won silver in the Triple jump and bronze in the Long jump.

Li Duan has become known for his showmanship, arriving on the runway still in tracksuit pants, then stripping down to his shorts with a flourish just before commencing a jump.

Li Duan was the final torchbearer of the 2022 Winter Paralympics in Beijing, and lit the flame during the opening ceremonies.
