= Arnaud Assoumani =

French Paralympic athlete (born 1985)

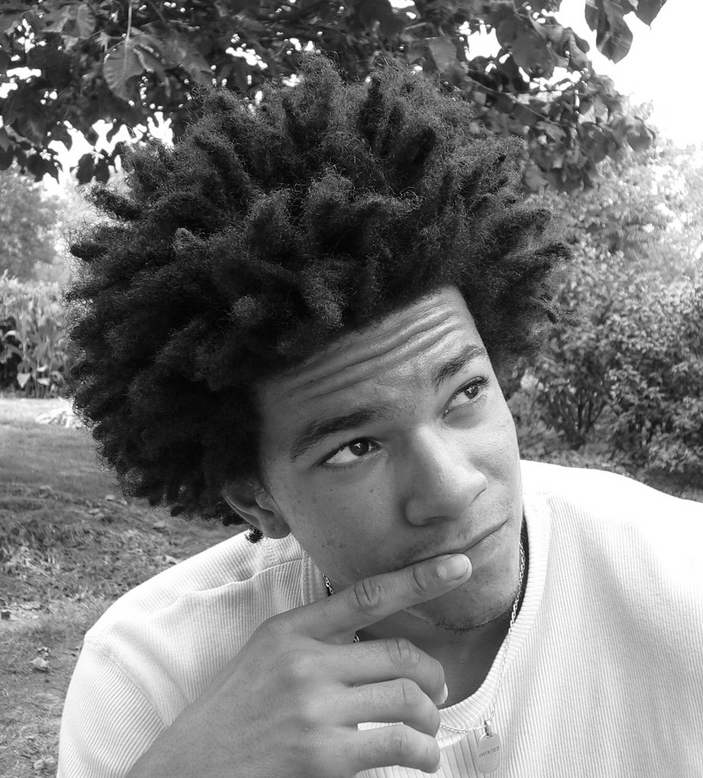
- Arnaud Assoumani (2005)

Personal information
- Nickname: Monsieur plus
- Nationality: France
- Born: 4 September 1985 (age 41) Orsay (essonne)

Sport
- Sport: Athletics
- Events: long jump, triple jump, 100 m
- Club: Stade Français
Medal record
Men's para athletics
Representing France
Paralympic Games
Gold medal – first place	2008 Beijing	Long jump F46
Silver medal – second place	2012 London	Triple jump F46
Bronze medal – third place	2004 Athens	Long jump F46
World Championships
Bronze medal – third place	2011 Christchurch	100 m T46

Arnaud Assoumani (born 4 September 1985) is a T46 French athlete.

He represented France in the F46 long jump at the 2008 Summer Paralympics, and won gold by setting a new world record with a jump of 7.23 metres. He had previously won bronze at the 2004 Games.

As of 2008, Assoumani is a student at the prestigious Institut d'études politiques de Paris. He is a left forearm amputee.

Arnaud Assoumani is a French athlete from Comorian origins, born without a lower left arm on 4 September 1985 at Orsay, near Paris. He grew up at Rochefort-sur-Loire (Maine-et-Loire).

He represented France in the long jump, F46 category, at the 2008 Paralympics Summer Games where he received a gold with a new world record of 7.23 meters. At the 2004 Paralympics Summer games, he received a bronze in the same event. He did better than his own world record at the 2010 Bercy French Elite room championship with a 7.82 meter jump. He tried to compete at the 2012 London Olympic Summer games as a regular competitor, but withdrew following an accident that hurts his Achilles tendon. He received a silver medal at triple jump at the 2012 Paralympics Summer games, with a 14.28 meter jump.

Arnaud Assoumani studied at the Institut d'études politiques de Paris where he earned a BTS in film cutting and post production in 2006 at EICAR.

He was selected to participate at the 2016 Rio Summer Paralympic games at the Palmarès France room athleticism championship (valids).

== Competitions ==
Long jump

- Bronze medal long jump at Paris Bercy

Palmarès at Paralympics Games Long jump

- Bronze medal at Athen 2004
- Paralympic champion andworld record 2008 (7,23 m)
- Paralympic Vice-Champion long jump and triple jump, London, 2012, (7,13 m)

Triple jump

- Paralympic Vice-Champion triple jump, London, 2012 (14,28 m)

Palmarès World Championship (handisport) Long jump

- World Champion long jump at Assen, 2006
- World Champion long jump at Christchurch, 2011
- Bronze medal long jump, Lyon, 2013

100m

- Bronze medal, Christchurch, 2011

Palmarès Europe championship (handisport) Saut en longueur

- Europe Vice-Champion long jump, Assen, 2003
- Europe Vice-Champion long jump, Espoo, 2005

Saut en hauteur

- Europe Champion high jump, Assen, 2003

Relay 4*100m

- Europe relay champion 4*100m, Assen, 2003

== Projects ==
In 2012, Arnaud Assoumani started a Golden Arm project, an effort to "graphically customize" prosthesis worn during competitions.

== Advertising ==
Arnaud Assoumani participates in Samsung advertising campaigns linked to Olympic Games.

== Distinctions ==
- Honnor Legion
