= Michal Stefanu =

Czech para table tennis player and wheelchair tennis player

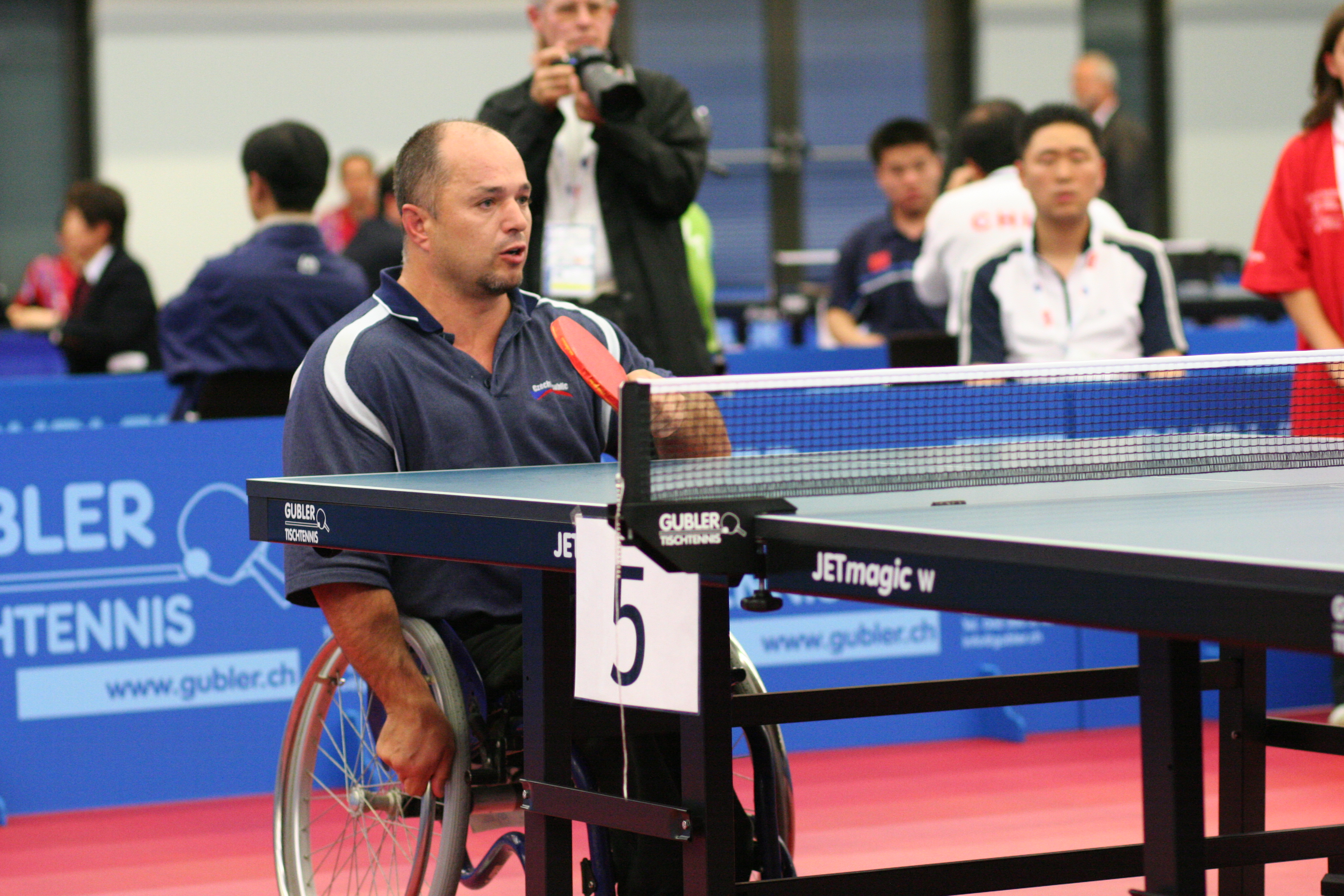
- Stefanu at 2006 World Championships

Personal information
- Born: 10 December 1965 (age 60) Náchod, Czechoslovakia

Sport
- Sport: Para table tennis
- Disability class: C4
Medal record
Para table tennis
Representing Czech Republic
Paralympic Games
| Gold medal – first place | 2000 Sydney | Men's singles C4 |
| Gold medal – first place | 2004 Athens | Men's teams C5 |
| Silver medal – second place | 1996 Atlanta | Men's singles C4 |
| Silver medal – second place | 2004 Athens | Men's singles C4 |
| Bronze medal – third place | 2000 Sydney | Men's teams C4 |
World Championships
| Gold medal – first place | 1998 Paris | Men's singles C4 |
| Silver medal – second place | 2002 Taipei | Men's singles C4 |
| Bronze medal – third place | 1998 Paris | Open singles wheelchair |
| Bronze medal – third place | 2006 Montreux | Open singles standing |
European Championships
| Gold medal – first place | 1997 Stockholm | Men's singles C4 |
| Gold medal – first place | 1997 Stockholm | Men's teams C4 |
| Gold medal – first place | 2001 Frankfurt | Men's teams C4 |
| Gold medal – first place | 2003 Zagreb | Men's teams C5 |
| Gold medal – first place | 2003 Zagreb | Open singles standing |
| Gold medal – first place | 2005 Jesolo | Men's teams C4 |
| Silver medal – second place | 2001 Frankfurt | Men's singles C4 |
| Silver medal – second place | 2005 Jesolo | Men's singles C4 |
| Bronze medal – third place | 1995 Hillerød | Men's teams C4 |
| Bronze medal – third place | 1999 Piešťany | Men's teams C5 |
| Bronze medal – third place | 2003 Zagreb | Men's singles C4 |

Michal Stefanu (born 10 December 1965) is a Czech former para table tennis player who competed at international table tennis competitions. He is a two-time Paralympic champion, World champion and six-time European champion in team events. Stefanu won his titles with René Tauš and František Glazar.

Stefanu now competes wheelchair tennis, his highest singles ranking is reaching world number 30 in September 2005. As of 2023, he has won six singles titles and seventeen doubles titles with Miroslav Brychta.
