= Zhang Hongwei (Paralympian) =

Chinese Paralympic athlete

Medal record

Men's para-athletics

Representing China

Paralympic Games
| Bronze medal – third place | 2004 Athens | Triple jump F46 |

Zhang Hongwei (simplified Chinese: 张宏伟; traditional Chinese: 張宏偉; pinyin: Zhāng Hóngwěi; born 1972) is a Chinese Paralympic track and field athlete who mainly competed in category F46 long jump and triple jump events.

He competed at the 2004 Summer Paralympics, where he participated in the Chinese T42–46 relay team, competed in the long jump, and won a bronze medal in the F46 triple jump.

A car accident during his youth left his left hand disabled. He graduated from Shenyang Sport University with a degree in sports training focused on disability sports training. After retiring in 2007, he worked at the Liaoyang Disabled Persons' Federation.

== main achievements ==
The 2000 Sydney Paralympic Games

Gold medal in the 46-meter long jump event, gold medal in the triple jump event

Set 2 world records that were previously held by oneself

1998 World Championships

World champion in long jump and triple jump (world record holder)

Far South Paralympic Games

1994, 1999: Gold medals in the 100-meter and long jump events of the F46 category

2002: Gold medals in long jump and triple jump

2004 Athens Paralympic Games

Bronze medal in the 3rd long jump event of the F46 category

National Paralympic Games

1996, Fourth Edition: 3 gold medals in the 100-meter race, 200-meter race and long jump.

Has accumulated over 50 domestic and international championships throughout his career.

== Honorary Title ==
National May Day Labor Award Medal （全国五一劳动奖）

China Youth May Fourth Outstanding Contribution Medal （中国青年五四杰出贡献奖）

Liaoning Province Labor Model and Outstanding Athlete（辽宁省劳动模范，优秀运动员）
