= Ling Yong =

Chinese Paralympic athlete

Medal record

Track and field (P54-58)

Representing China

Paralympic Games
Gold medal – first place	2004 Athens	Pentathlon – P54-58

Ling Yong (凌勇; born 1978) is a Paralympic athlete from China competing in P54-58 pentathlon events (seated shot put, seated javelin throw, 200m wheelchair sprint, seated discus throw, 1500m wheelchair race).

Ling contracted poliomyelitis in his youth. He began competing in wheelchair marathons in 1999. He competed in the 2004 Summer Paralympics in Athens, Greece. There he won a gold medal in the men's Pentathlon – P54-58 event with a world record performance that still stands in January 2013.
