= Athletics at the 2004 Summer Paralympics – Women's shot put F52–58 =

Women's shot put events for wheelchair athletes were held at the 2004 Summer Paralympics in the Athens Olympic Stadium. Events were held in three disability classes, F52/53 being held jointly with F32-34 cerebral palsy athletes.

== F32-34/52/53 ==
Women's Shot Put F32-34/52/53 at the XII Paralympic Games
- Venue: Athens Olympic Stadium
- Dates: 26 September 2004
- Competitors: 11 from 9 nations
- Winning distance: 4.59

Medalists
1st place, gold medalist(s)		Maria E. Salas	Mexico
2nd place, silver medalist(s)		Tetyana Yakybchuk	Ukraine
3rd place, bronze medalist(s)		Maha Alsheraian	Kuwait

The F32-34/52/53 event was won by Maria E. Salas, representing Mexico.

26 Sept. 2004, 18:00

Rank	Athlete	Result	Points	Notes
1st place, gold medalist(s)	Maria E. Salas (MEX)	4.59	1334	WR
2nd place, silver medalist(s)	Tetyana Yakybchuk (UKR)	6.43	1185	WR
3rd place, bronze medalist(s)	Maha Alsheraian (KUW)	5.26	1174	WR
4	Kyoko Sato (JPN)	5.01	1118	
5	Birgit Pohl (GER)	8.54	1104	PR
6	Louise Ellery (AUS)	4.93	1100	
7	Sonja Lloyd (RSA)	5.68	1047	
8	Tanya Swanepoel (RSA)	5.35	986	
9	Tiina Ala Aho (FIN)	4.88	899	
10	Alice Kibue (KEN)	2.94	854	
11	Leticia Ochoa (MEX)	2.79	811	

== F54/55 ==
Women's Shot Put F54/55 at the XII Paralympic Games
- Venue: Athens Olympic Stadium
- Dates: 19 September 2004
- Competitors: 14 from 11 nations
- Winning distance: 9.06

Medalists
1st place, gold medalist(s)		Marianne Buggenhagen	Germany
2nd place, silver medalist(s)		Eva Kacanu	Czech Republic
3rd place, bronze medalist(s)		Tatjana Majcen	Slovenia

The F54/55 event was won by Marianne Buggenhagen, representing Germany.

19 September. 2004, 17:00

Rank	Athlete	Result	Points	Notes
1st place, gold medalist(s)	Marianne Buggenhagen (GER)	9.06	1045	WR
2nd place, silver medalist(s)	Eva Kacanu (CZE)	6.18	1016	
3rd place, bronze medalist(s)	Tatjana Majcen (SLO)	6.00	986	
4	Sally Reddin (GBR)	5.96	980	
5	Xu Ning (CHN)	7.76	895	
6	Zanele Situ (RSA)	5.37	883	
7	Dora Garcia (MEX)	5.36	881	
8	Malathi Krishna (IND)	5.24	861	
9	Evelyn Schmied (AUT)	5.23	860	
10	Carmen Acunto (ITA)	7.07	816	
11	Jana Fesslova (CZE)	6.86	791	
12	Chen Li Ping (CHN)	4.81	791	
13	Wang Ting (CHN)	4.71	774	
14	Hania Aidi (TUN)	4.46	733	

== F56-58 ==
Women's Shot Put F56-58 at the XII Paralympic Games
- Venue: Athens Olympic Stadium
- Dates: 20 September 2004
- Competitors: 17 from 11 nations
- Winning distance: 9.79

Medalists
1st place, gold medalist(s)		Nadia Medjmedj	Algeria
2nd place, silver medalist(s)		Li Ling	China
3rd place, bronze medalist(s)		Martina Willing	Germany

The F56-58 event was won by Nadia Medjmedj, representing Algeria.

20 September. 2004, 17:00

Rank	Athlete	Result	Points	Notes
1st place, gold medalist(s)	Nadia Medjmedj (ALG)	9.79	1184	WR
2nd place, silver medalist(s)	Li Ling (CHN)	9.64	1165	
3rd place, bronze medalist(s)	Martina Willing (GER)	7.94	1113	PR
4	Njideka E. Iyiazi (NGR)	10.12	1106	WR
5	Catalina Rosales (MEX)	10.04	1097	
6	Ivanka Koleva (BUL)	8.79	1063	
7	Sofia Djelal (ALG)	9.17	1002	
8	Roseane Santos (BRA)	8.98	981	
9	Suely Guimaraes (BRA)	6.97	977	
10	Mary N. Zakayo (KEN)	8.03	971	
11	Chen Fang (CHN)	8.44	922	
12	Fatemeh Montazeri (IRI)	8.36	913	
13	Leticia Aleman (MEX)	6.30	883	
14	Araceli Castro (MEX)	7.78	850	
15	Phelomena Chepkoech (KEN)	6.47	782	
16	Moline Muza (ZIM)	7.02	767	
17	Melaica S. Tuinfort (SUR)	5.29	639	
