= Athletics at the 2004 Summer Paralympics – Women's discus throw F51–58 =

Women's discus throw events for wheelchair athletes were held at the 2004 Summer Paralympics in the Athens Olympic Stadium. Events were held in three disability classes, F51-53 being held jointly with F32-34 cerebral palsy athletes.

== F32-34/51-53 ==
Women's Discus F32-34/51-53 at the XII Paralympic Games
- Venue: Athens Olympic Stadium
- Dates: 20 September 2004
- Competitors: 12 from 10 nations
- Winning distance: 15.28

Medalists
1st place, gold medalist(s)		Martina Kniezkova	Czech Republic
2nd place, silver medalist(s)		Kyoko Sato	Japan
3rd place, bronze medalist(s)		Maha Alsheraian	Kuwait

The F32-34/51-53 event was won by Martina Kniezkova, representing Czech Republic.

20 Sept. 2004, 09:00

Rank	Athlete	Result	Points	Notes
1st place, gold medalist(s)	Martina Kniezkova (CZE)	15.28	1330	WR
2nd place, silver medalist(s)	Kyoko Sato (JPN)	11.09	1289	WR
3rd place, bronze medalist(s)	Maha Alsheraian (KUW)	9.94	1155	
4	Tetyana Yakybchuk (UKR)	14.20	1038	PR
5	Birgit Pohl (GER)	20.52	1000	PR
6	Sonja Lloyd (RSA)	12.19	891	
7	Tanya Swanepoel (RSA)	11.85	866	
8	Maria E. Salas (MEX)	11.36	821	
9	Sonia Gouveia (BRA)	9.85	712	
10	Alice Kibue (KEN)	8.49	614	
11	Leticia Ochoa (MEX)	8.37	605	
	Louise Ellery (AUS)	NMR		

== F54/55 ==
Women's Discus F54/55 at the XII Paralympic Games
- Venue: Athens Olympic Stadium
- Dates: 24 September 2004
- Competitors: 13 from 10 nations
- Winning distance: 16.47

Medalists
1st place, gold medalist(s)		Wang Ting	China
2nd place, silver medalist(s)		Marianne Buggenhagen	Germany
3rd place, bronze medalist(s)		Chen Li Ping	China

The F54/55 event was won by Wang Ting, representing China.

=== Result ===
24 Sept. 2004, 10:00

Rank	Athlete	Result	Points	Notes
1st place, gold medalist(s)	Wang Ting (CHN)	16.47	1091	
2nd place, silver medalist(s)	Marianne Buggenhagen (GER)	27.57	1078	WR
3rd place, bronze medalist(s)	Chen Li Ping (CHN)	15.91	1054	
4	Tatjana Majcen (SLO)	14.78	979	
5	Vinnette Green (JAM)	14.73	976	
6	Leticia Torres (MEX)	14.54	963	
7	Zanele Situ (RSA)	13.41	888	
8	Xu Ning (CHN)	21.51	841	
9	Evelyn Schmied (AUT)	12.42	823	
10	Hania Aidi (TUN)	12.19	807	
11	Dora Garcia (MEX)	11.64	771	
12	Jana Fesslova (CZE)	19.04	744	
13	Malathi Krishna (IND)	14.67	573	

== F56-58 ==
Women's Discus F56-58 at the XII Paralympic Games
- Venue: Athens Olympic Stadium
- Dates: 25 September 2004
- Competitors: 19 from 12 nations
- Winning distance: 24.30

Medalists
1st place, gold medalist(s)		Suely Guimarães	Brazil
2nd place, silver medalist(s)		Li Ling	China
3rd place, bronze medalist(s)		Azam Khodayari	Iran

The F56-58 event was won by Suely Guimaraes, representing Brazil.

=== Result ===
25 Sept. 2004, 09:00

Rank	Athlete	Result	Points	Notes
1st place, gold medalist(s)	Suely Guimarães (BRA)	24.30	1138	PR
2nd place, silver medalist(s)	Li Ling (CHN)	24.95	1054	WR
3rd place, bronze medalist(s)	Azam Khodayari (IRI)	24.86	1050	
4	Martina Willing (GER)	22.39	1049	
5	Nadia Medjmedj (ALG)	24.54	1037	
6	Roseane Santos (BRA)	31.73	1023	WR
7	Karima Feleifal (EGY)	31.62	1019	
8	Chen Fang (CHN)	30.88	995	
9	Ivanka Koleva (BUL)	22.83	965	
10	Njideka E. Iyiazi (NGR)	29.84	962	
11	Sylvia Grant (JAM)	22.69	959	
12	Shaimaa Abd Ellatif (EGY)	22.46	949	
13	Sofia Djelal (ALG)	28.21	909	
14	Catalina Rosales (MEX)	26.08	840	
15	Phelomena Chepkoech (KEN)	16.78	709	
16	Veronica Saucedo (MEX)	14.90	698	
17	Meira Vaa (SAM)	18.54	597	
18	Mary N. Zakayo (KEN)	17.34	559	
	Fatemeh Montazeri (IRI)	NMR		
