= Athletics at the 2004 Summer Paralympics – Women's javelin throw F52–58 =

Women's javelin throw events for wheelchair athletes were held at the 2004 Summer Paralympics in the Athens Olympic Stadium. Events were held in three disability classes, F52/53 being held jointly with F33/34 cerebral palsy athletes.

== F33/34/52/53 ==
Women's Javelin F33/34/52/53 at the XII Paralympic Games
- Venue: Athens Olympic Stadium
- Dates: 24 September 2004
- Competitors: 10 from 9 nations
- Winning distance: 11.08

Medalists
1st place, gold medalist(s)		Esther Rivera	Mexico
2nd place, silver medalist(s)		Maria E. Salas	Mexico
3rd place, bronze medalist(s)		Tiina Ala Aho	Finland

The F33/34/52/53 event was won by Esther Rivera, representing Mexico.

24 Sept. 2004, 09:00

Rank	Athlete	Result	Points	Notes
1st place, gold medalist(s)	Esther Rivera (MEX)	11.08	1543	WR
2nd place, silver medalist(s)	Maria E. Salas (MEX)	10.79	1502	
3rd place, bronze medalist(s)	Tiina Ala Aho (FIN)	13.32	1258	
4	Rosemary Tallon (IRL)	8.72	1214	
5	Martina Kniezkova (CZE)	9.42	1111	PR
6	Tetyana Yakybchuk (UKR)	11.61	1097	
7	Sonia Gouveia (BRA)	7.46	1038	
8	Birgit Pohl (GER)	15.55	960	
9	Sonja Lloyd (RSA)	10.13	957	
10	Alice Kibue (KEN)	5.76	679	

== F54/55 ==
Women's Javelin F54/55 at the XII Paralympic Games
- Venue: Athens Olympic Stadium
- Dates: 26 September 2004
- Competitors: 8 from 6 nations
- Winning distance: 14.75

Medalists
1st place, gold medalist(s)		Zanele Situ	South Africa
2nd place, silver medalist(s)		Tatjana Majcen	Slovenia
3rd place, bronze medalist(s)		Chen Li Ping	China

The F54/55 event was won by Zanele Situ, representing South Africa.

26 Sept. 2004, 19:30

Rank	Athlete	Result	Points	Notes
1st place, gold medalist(s)	Zanele Situ (RSA)	14.75	1145	WR
2nd place, silver medalist(s)	Tatjana Majcen (SLO)	12.37	960	
3rd place, bronze medalist(s)	Chen Li Ping (CHN)	12.35	958	
4	Hania Aidi (TUN)	12.22	948	
5	Marianne Buggenhagen (GER)	19.34	940	
6	Xu Ning (CHN)	18.10	880	
7	Dora Garcia (MEX)	10.70	830	
8	Wang Ting (CHN)	10.44	810	

== F56-58 ==
Women's Javelin F56-58 at the XII Paralympic Games
- Venue: Athens Olympic Stadium
- Dates: 27 September 2004
- Competitors: 16 from 11 nations
- Winning distance: 30.97

Medalists
1st place, gold medalist(s)		Sofia Djelal	Algeria
2nd place, silver medalist(s)		Njideka E. Iyiazi	Nigeria
3rd place, bronze medalist(s)		Aziza Hussein	Egypt

The F56-58 event was won by Sofia Djelal, representing Algeria.

27 Sept. 2004, 09:00

Rank	Athlete	Result	Points	Notes
1st place, gold medalist(s)	Sofia Djelal (ALG)	30.97	1240	WR
2nd place, silver medalist(s)	Njideka E. Iyiazi (NGR)	27.61	1105	
3rd place, bronze medalist(s)	Aziza Hussein (EGY)	20.99	1015	
4	Araceli Castro (MEX)	25.29	1012	
5	Zahra Taghibeigloo (IRI)	24.02	961	
6	Martina Willing (GER)	21.88	938	
7	Phelomena Chepkoech (KEN)	18.10	875	
8	Li Ling (CHN)	17.85	863	
9	Sylvia Grant (JAM)	17.12	828	
10	Moline Muza (ZIM)	20.22	809	
11	Ivanka Koleva (BUL)	16.43	795	
12	Mary N. Zakayo (KEN)	17.68	707	
13	Chen Fang (CHN)	13.17	527	
14	Christine Rongoe (KEN)	9.44	456	
15	Maribel Galindo (MEX)	7.41	317	
	Catalina Rosales (MEX)	DNS	0	
