= Athletics at the 2004 Summer Paralympics – Women's shot put F35–38 =

Women's shot put events for athletes with cerebral palsy were held at the 2004 Summer Paralympics in the Athens Olympic Stadium. Events were held in three disability classes or ranges, F32-34 being held jointly with F52/53 wheelchair athletes.

== F32-34/52/53 ==
Women's Shot Put F32-34/52/53 at the XII Paralympic Games
- Venue: Athens Olympic Stadium
- Dates: 26 September 2004
- Competitors: 11 from 9 nations
- Winning distance: 4.59

Medalists
1st place, gold medalist(s)		Maria E. Salas	Mexico
2nd place, silver medalist(s)		Tetyana Yakybchuk	Ukraine
3rd place, bronze medalist(s)		Maha Alsheraian	Kuwait

The F32-34/52/53 event was won by Maria E. Salas, representing Mexico.

26 Sept. 2004, 18:00

Rank	Athlete	Result	Points	Notes
1st place, gold medalist(s)	Maria E. Salas (MEX)	4.59	1334	WR
2nd place, silver medalist(s)	Tetyana Yakybchuk (UKR)	6.43	1185	WR
3rd place, bronze medalist(s)	Maha Alsheraian (KUW)	5.26	1174	WR
4	Kyoko Sato (JPN)	5.01	1118	
5	Birgit Pohl (GER)	8.54	1104	PR
6	Louise Ellery (AUS)	4.93	1100	
7	Sonja Lloyd (RSA)	5.68	1047	
8	Tanya Swanepoel (RSA)	5.35	986	
9	Tiina Ala Aho (FIN)	4.88	899	
10	Alice Kibue (KEN)	2.94	854	
11	Leticia Ochoa (MEX)	2.79	811	

== F35/36 ==
Women's Shot Put F35/36 at the XII Paralympic Games
- Venue: Athens Olympic Stadium
- Dates: 23 September 2004
- Competitors: 12 from 8 nations
- Winning distance: 9.47

Medalists
1st place, gold medalist(s)		Veronika Foltova	Czech Republic
2nd place, silver medalist(s)		Renata Chilewska	Poland
3rd place, bronze medalist(s)		Alla Malchyk	Ukraine

The F35/36 event was won by Veronika Foltova, representing Czech Republic.

23 September 2004, 09:00

Rank	Athlete	Result	Points	Notes
1st place, gold medalist(s)	Veronika Foltova (CZE)	9.47	1363	WR
2nd place, silver medalist(s)	Renata Chilewska (POL)	9.09	1308	
3rd place, bronze medalist(s)	Alla Malchyk (UKR)	8.90	1146	
4	Jane Mandean (RSA)	7.58	1091	
5	Viktoria Shayer (UKR)	7.48	1076	
6	Perla Amanda Munoz (ARG)	7.25	1043	
7	Bai Xu Hong (CHN)	7.22	1039	
8	Kris Vriend (CAN)	7.99	1029	
9	Chennele van Zyl (RSA)	6.41	922	
10	Katie Wallace (CAN)	6.20	892	
11	Sanita Lietniece (LAT)	6.79	874	
12	Beverly Mashinini (RSA)	5.87	844	

== F37/38 ==
Women's Shot Put F37/38 at the XII Paralympic Games
- Venue: Athens Olympic Stadium
- Dates: 27 September 2004
- Competitors: 12 from 8 nations
- Winning distance: 11.07

Medalists
1st place, gold medalist(s)		Aldona Grigaliuniene	Lithuania
2nd place, silver medalist(s)		Vladimira Bujarkova	Czech Republic
3rd place, bronze medalist(s)		Eva Berna	Czech Republic

The F37/38 event was won by Aldona Grigaliuniene, representing Lithuania.

27 September 2004, 09:00

Rank	Athlete	Result	Points	Notes
1st place, gold medalist(s)	Aldona Grigaliuniene (LTU)	11.07	1105	WR
2nd place, silver medalist(s)	Vladimira Bujarkova (CZE)	9.68	1051	
3rd place, bronze medalist(s)	Eva Berna (CZE)	9.47	1028	
4	Beverley Jones (GBR)	10.21	1019	
5	Viktoriya Yasevych (UKR)	8.96	973	
6	Ingrida Priede (LAT)	9.40	939	
7	Joanne Bradshaw (AUS)	8.60	933	
8	Maija Emulova (LAT)	8.58	931	
9	Li Chun Hua (CHN)	8.24	894	
10	Katsuko Nakajima (JPN)	8.19	889	
11	Amanda Fraser (AUS)	7.76	842	
12	Andrea Farkasova (CZE)	6.99	698	
