= Athletics at the 2004 Summer Paralympics – Women's discus throw F32–38 =

Women's discus throw events for athletes with cerebral palsy were held at the 2004 Summer Paralympics in the Athens Olympic Stadium. Events were held in three disability classes or ranges, F32-34 being held jointly with 51-53 wheelchair athletes.

== F32-34/51-53 ==
Women's Discus F32-34/51-53 at the XII Paralympic Games
- Venue: Athens Olympic Stadium
- Dates: 20 September 2004
- Competitors: 12 from 10 nations
- Winning distance: 15.28

Medalists
1st place, gold medalist(s)		Martina Kniezkova	Czech Republic
2nd place, silver medalist(s)		Kyoko Sato	Japan
3rd place, bronze medalist(s)		Maha Alsheraian	Kuwait

The F32-34/51-53 event was won by Martina Kniezkova, representing Czech Republic.

20 Sept. 2004, 09:00

Rank	Athlete	Result	Points	Notes
1st place, gold medalist(s)	Martina Kniezkova (CZE)	15.28	1330	WR
2nd place, silver medalist(s)	Kyoko Sato (JPN)	11.09	1289	WR
3rd place, bronze medalist(s)	Maha Alsheraian (KUW)	9.94	1155	
4	Tetyana Yakybchuk (UKR)	14.20	1038	PR
5	Birgit Pohl (GER)	20.52	1000	PR
6	Sonja Lloyd (RSA)	12.19	891	
7	Tanya Swanepoel (RSA)	11.85	866	
8	Maria E. Salas (MEX)	11.36	821	
9	Sonia Gouveia (BRA)	9.85	712	
10	Alice Kibue (KEN)	8.49	614	
11	Leticia Ochoa (MEX)	8.37	605	
	Louise Ellery (AUS)	NMR		

== F35/36/38 ==
Women's Discus F35/36/38 at the XII Paralympic Games
- Venue: Athens Olympic Stadium
- Dates: 19 September 2004
- Competitors: 14 from 9 nations
- Winning distance: 23.47

Medalists
1st place, gold medalist(s)		Veronika Foltova	Czech Republic
2nd place, silver medalist(s)		Bai Xu Hong	China
3rd place, bronze medalist(s)		Renata Chilewska	Poland

The F35/36/38 event was won by Veronika Foltova, representing Czech Republic.

19 Sept. 2004, 17:00

Rank	Athlete	Result	Points	Notes
1st place, gold medalist(s)	Veronika Foltova (CZE)	23.47	1323	PR
2nd place, silver medalist(s)	Bai Xu Hong (CHN)	22.95	1294	
3rd place, bronze medalist(s)	Renata Chilewska (POL)	21.82	1230	
4	Viktoria Shayer (UKR)	21.42	1208	
5	Alla Malchyk (UKR)	22.12	1109	WR
6	Jane Mandean (RSA)	19.38	1093	
7	Ingrīda Priede (LAT)	27.42	1073	WR
8	Chennele van Zyl (RSA)	18.21	1027	
9	Perla Muñoz (ARG)	17.20	970	
10	Beverly Mashinini (RSA)	16.31	919	
11	Aldona Grigaliuniene (LTU)	21.74	850	
12	Sanita Lietniece (LAT)	15.29	767	
13	Andrea Farkasova (CZE)	17.89	700	
	Kris Vriend (CAN)	NMR		

== F37 ==
Women's Discus F37 at the XII Paralympic Games
- Venue: Athens Olympic Stadium
- Dates: 20 September 2004
- Competitors: 11 from 8 nations
- Winning distance: 28.20

Medalists
1st place, gold medalist(s)		Li Chun Hua	China
2nd place, silver medalist(s)		Amanda Fraser	Australia
3rd place, bronze medalist(s)		Fatma Kachroudi	Tunisia

The F37 event was won by Li Chun Hua, representing China.

20 Sept. 2004, 09:00

Rank	Athlete	Result	Points	Notes
1st place, gold medalist(s)	Li Chun Hua (CHN)	28.20	700	WR
2nd place, silver medalist(s)	Amanda Fraser (AUS)	26.30	701	
3rd place, bronze medalist(s)	Fatma Kachroudi (TUN)	26.15	702	
4	Eva Berna (CZE)	25.10	703	
5	Viktoriya Yasevych (UKR)	24.27	704	
6	Debbie Wendt (AUS)	22.51	705	
7	Vladimira Bujarkova (CZE)	22.51	706	
8	Maija Emulova (LAT)	22.11	707	
9	Joanne Bradshaw (AUS)	20.17	708	
10	Katsuko Nakajima (JPN)	19.74	709	
11	Salma G. Mohamed (SUD)	15.51	710	
