= Athletics at the 2008 Summer Paralympics – Women's javelin throw F54–56 =

Women's Javelin F54-56 at the XIII Paralympic Games
- Venue: Beijing National Stadium
- Dates: 14 September
- Competitors: 14 from 10 nations
- Winning distance: 23.99

Medalists
1st place, gold medalist(s)		Martina Monika Willing	Germany
2nd place, silver medalist(s)		Hania Aidi	Tunisia
3rd place, bronze medalist(s)		Daniela Todorova	Bulgaria

The women's javelin F54-56 event at the 2008 Summer Paralympics took place at the Beijing National Stadium at 17:00 on 14 September. There was a single round of competition; after the first three throws, only the top eight had 3 further throws. The competition was won by Martina Monika Willing, representing Germany.

== Results ==
Rank	Athlete	Nationality	Cl.	1	2	3	4	5	6	Best	Pts.	Notes
1st place, gold medalist(s)	Martina Monika Willing	Germany	F56	23.70	23.85	23.99	x	22.46	22.30	23.99	1204	PR
2nd place, silver medalist(s)	Hania Aidi	Tunisia	F54	15.57	16.05	16.83	x	16.13	16.24	16.83	1149	WR
3rd place, bronze medalist(s)	Daniela Todorova	Bulgaria	F55	19.32	19.38	18.90	18.33	x	18.60	19.38	1092	SB
4	Chen Liping	China	F54	14.86	15.68	15.24	14.96	15.34	x	15.68	1071	
5	Tanja Cerkvenik	Slovenia	F55	18.50	18.02	16.45	18.69	18.01	x	18.69	1053	SB
6	Yang Liwan	China	F55	17.58	17.94	18.24	17.68	x	17.91	18.24	1027	SB
7	Zanele Situ	South Africa	F54	14.82	13.14	13.34	x	14.59	14.14	14.82	1012	SB
8	Marianne Buggenhagen	Germany	F55	16.69	17.64	16.39	17.01	16.57	x	17.64	994	
9	Jana Fesslova	Czech Republic	F55	17.16	17.20	17.30	-	-	-	17.30	974	
10	Wang Ting	China	F54	13.31	x	13.96	-	-	-	13.96	953	SB
11	Jenni Bryce	Australia	F56	16.39	16.96	17.88	-	-	-	17.88	898	
12	Tatjana Majcen Ljubic	Slovenia	F54	11.79	x	12.78	-	-	-	12.78	873	
13	Milka Milinkovic	Croatia	F55	x	14.09	14.55	-	-	-	14.55	819	
14	Dora Garcia	Mexico	F54	11.46	11.47	11.61	-	-	-	11.61	793	

WR = World Record. PR = Paralympic Record. SB = Seasonal Best.
