= Athletics at the 2008 Summer Paralympics – Women's discus throw F32–34/51–53 =

The Women's Shot Put F32-34/51-53 had its Final held on September 10 at 17:00.

== Medalists ==
Gold	Tetyana Yakybchuk; Ukraine
Silver	Frances Herrmann; Germany
Bronze	Yousra Ben Jemaa; Tunisia

== Results ==
Place	Athlete	Class	1	2	3	4	5	6	Best	Points
1	Tetyana Yakybchuk (UKR)	F33	17.05	16.55	16.99	x	14.73	15.76	17.05 WR	1129
2	Frances Herrmann (GER)	F34	19.44	18.95	21.19	18.54	20.35	x	21.19 WR	1108
3	Yousra Ben Jemaa (TUN)	F34	20.16	19.96	20.63	20.17	20.94	21.00	21.00	1098
4	Birgit Pohl (GER)	F34	19.55	19.75	20.17	x	19.50	20.54	20.54	1074
5	Brydee Moore (AUS)	F33	16.02	x	14.96	15.08	14.87	x	16.02	1061
6	Catherine Wayland (IRL)	F51	5.74	5.84	5.98	5.98	6.13	6.03	6.13	1010
7	Jessica Hamill (NZL)	F34	17.45	x	19.27	18.77	16.79	17.57	19.27	1008
8	Gemma Prescott (GBR)	F32	10.51	11.01	8.88	10.86	9.88	10.01	11.01	993
9	Martina Kniezkova (CZE)	F52	13.39	13.14	13.30				13.39	902
10	Antonia Balek (CRO)	F52	12.29	12.83	13.11				13.11	883
11	Maha Alsheraian (KUW)	F32	9.62	9.63	9.23				9.63	868
12	Louadjeda Benoumessad (ALG)	F34	15.81	15.97	16.25				16.25	850
13	Estela Salas (MEX)	F53	11.19	12.41	12.59				12.59 PR	848
14	Sonia Gouveia (BRA)	F53	11.32	11.91	11.86				11.91	802
15	Robyn Stawski (USA)	F33	11.24	10.88	11.23				11.24	745
16	Thuraya Alzaabi (UAE)	F34	x	13.34	13.03				13.34	698
17	Ouassila Oussadit (ALG)	F32	6.71	7.00	x				7.00	631
18	Fatema Nedham (BRN)	F53	6.7	8.21	8.10				8.21	553
19	Aroua Bidani (TUN)	F32	5.96	5.76	5.30				5.96	537
