= Athletics at the 2008 Summer Paralympics – Women's discus throw F54–56 =

Women's Discus F54-56 at the XIII Paralympic Games
- Venue: Beijing National Stadium
- Dates: 9 September
- Competitors: 10 from 7 nations
- Winning distance: 27.80

Medalists
1st place, gold medalist(s)		Marianne Buggenhagen	Germany
2nd place, silver medalist(s)		Wang Ting	China
3rd place, bronze medalist(s)		Jana Fesslova	Czech Republic

The women's discus F54-56 event at the 2008 Summer Paralympics took place at the Beijing National Stadium at 09:00 on 9 September. There was a single round of competition; after the first three throws, only the top eight had 3 further throws. The competition was won by Marianne Buggenhagen, representing Germany.

== Results ==
Rank	Athlete	Nationality	Cl.	1	2	3	4	5	6	Best	Pts.	Notes
1st place, gold medalist(s)	Marianne Buggenhagen	Germany	F55	26.96	27.34	27.80	26.59	27.02	26.89	27.80	1060	WR
2nd place, silver medalist(s)	Wang Ting	China	F54	14.95	15.83	15.84	16.33	16.37	17.04	17.04	1010	
3rd place, bronze medalist(s)	Jana Fesslova	Czech Republic	F55	24.35	24.65	23.90	24.63	24.37	24.82	24.82	946	
4	Dong Feixia	China	F55	20.79	21.29	23.93	23.66	24.22	24.59	24.59	937	
5	Chen Liping	China	F54	13.97	15.82	14.89	15.07	15.17	14.78	15.82	937	
6	Martina Monika Willing	Germany	F56	22.96	23.36	23.31	21.84	21.95	22.91	23.36	890	
7	Tatjana Majcen Ljubic	Slovenia	F54	x	x	14.78	14.60	14.69	14.42	14.78	876	
8	Suely Guimaraes	Brazil	F56	21.17	21.98	21.62	19.38	x	20.84	21.98	838	SB
9	Zanele Situ	South Africa	F54	13.83	13.84	x	-	-	-	13.83	820	SB
10	Vinnette Green	Jamaica	F54	12.40	13.05	13.07	-	-	-	13.07	775	

WR = World Record. SB = Seasonal Best.
