= Athletics at the 2004 Summer Paralympics – Women's javelin throw F33–38 =

Women's javelin throw events for athletes with cerebral palsy were held at the 2004 Summer Paralympics in the Athens Olympic Stadium. Events were held in two disability classes or ranges, F33/34 being held jointly with F52/53 wheelchair athletes.

== F33/34/52/53 ==
Women's Javelin F33/34/52/53 at the XII Paralympic Games
- Venue: Athens Olympic Stadium
- Dates: 24 September 2004
- Competitors: 10 from 9 nations
- Winning distance: 11.08

Medalists
1st place, gold medalist(s)		Esther Rivera	Mexico
2nd place, silver medalist(s)		Maria E. Salas	Mexico
3rd place, bronze medalist(s)		Tiina Ala Aho	Finland

The F33/34/52/53 event was won by Esther Rivera, representing Mexico.

24 Sept. 2004, 09:00

Rank	Athlete	Result	Points	Notes
1st place, gold medalist(s)	Esther Rivera (MEX)	11.08	1543	WR
2nd place, silver medalist(s)	Maria E. Salas (MEX)	10.79	1502	
3rd place, bronze medalist(s)	Tiina Ala Aho (FIN)	13.32	1258	
4	Rosemary Tallon (IRL)	8.72	1214	
5	Martina Kniezkova (CZE)	9.42	1111	PR
6	Tetyana Yakybchuk (UKR)	11.61	1097	
7	Sonia Gouveia (BRA)	7.46	1038	
8	Birgit Pohl (GER)	15.55	960	
9	Sonja Lloyd (RSA)	10.13	957	
10	Alice Kibue (KEN)	5.76	679	

== F35-38 ==
Women's Javelin F35-38 at the XII Paralympic Games
- Venue: Athens Olympic Stadium
- Dates: 21 September 2004
- Competitors: 14 from 8 nations
- Winning distance: 23.24

Medalists
1st place, gold medalist(s)		Renata Chilewska	Poland
2nd place, silver medalist(s)		Veronika Foltova	Czech Republic
3rd place, bronze medalist(s)		Beverly Mashinini	South Africa

The F35-38 event was won by Renata Chilewska, representing Poland.

21 September 2004, 09:00

Rank	Athlete	Result	Points	Notes
1st place, gold medalist(s)	Renata Chilewska (POL)	23.24	1318	PR
2nd place, silver medalist(s)	Veronika Foltova (CZE)	22.70	1288	
3rd place, bronze medalist(s)	Beverly Mashinini (RSA)	21.94	1245	
4	Katrina Webb (AUS)	28.47	1223	WR
5	Lisa Callaghan (IRL)	24.12	1087	WR
6	Perla Amanda Munoz (ARG)	17.82	1011	
7	Jane Mandean (RSA)	17.69	1003	
8	Chennele van Zyl (RSA)	17.35	984	
9	Andrea Farkasova (CZE)	22.02	946	
10	Eva Berna (CZE)	20.63	930	
11	Pauline Latto (GBR)	19.49	878	
12	Debbie Wendt (AUS)	18.77	846	
13	Viktoria Shayer (UKR)	14.87	843	
14	Viktoriya Yasevych (UKR)	17.32	781	
