= 2013 IPC Athletics World Championships – Women's javelin throw =

The women's javelin throw at the 2013 IPC Athletics World Championships was held at the Stade du Rhône from 20 to 29 July.

== Medalists ==
Class	Gold	Silver	Bronze
F12/13	Anna Sorokina; Russia	Natalija Eder; Austria	Liu Ya-ting; Chinese Taipei
F33/34	Birgit Kober; Germany	Marjaana Heikkinen; Finland	Marie Brämer-Skowronek; Germany
F46	Hollie Arnold; United Kingdom	Holly Robinson; New Zealand	Yukiko Kato; Japan
F52/53	Maria Salas; Mexico	Dimitra Korokida; Greece	Esther Rivera; Mexico
F54/55/56	Hania Aidi; Tunisia	Yang Liwan; China	Ntombizanele Situ; South Africa
F57/58	Safia Djelal; Algeria	Sylvia Grant; Jamaica	Cece Mazyck; United States

== See also ==
- List of IPC world records in athletics
