= Athletics at the 2007 Parapan American Games =

- Venue: João Havelange Stadium
- Dates: August 13 - August 19

Athletics contests were held at the 2007 Parapan American Games from August 13 to 19 at the João Havelange Stadium in Rio de Janeiro, Brazil.

== Medal table ==
Brazil topped the medal table with a total of 73 medals.

Host nation

* Host nation (Brazil)

Rank	Nation	Gold	Silver	Bronze	Total
1	Brazil (BRA)*	25	27	21	73
2	Mexico (MEX)	17	16	11	44
3	Cuba (CUB)	14	9	8	31
4	United States (USA)	12	10	16	38
5	Canada (CAN)	8	4	4	16
6	Venezuela (VEN)	3	6	4	13
7	Argentina (ARG)	2	5	11	18
8	Jamaica (JAM)	1	2	2	5
9	Puerto Rico (PUR)	1	1	2	4
10	Colombia (COL)	0	1	1	2
11	Panama (PAN)	0	1	0	1
11	Peru (PER)	0	1	0	1
13	Ecuador (ECU)	0	0	1	1
13	El Salvador (ESA)	0	0	1	1
Totals (14 entries)		83	83	82	248

== Medalists ==
=== Men's events ===
Event	Gold	Silver	Bronze
Men's 100 metres T11	Lucas Prado; Brazil	Felipe Gomes; Brazil	Hilário Neto; Brazil
Men's 100 metres T12	Julio Alberto Roque Rosabal; Cuba	Pedro Moraes; Brazil	Josiah Jamison; United States
Men's 100 metres T13	André Andrade; Brazil	Royal Mitchell; United States	Luis Manuel Galano; Cuba
Men's 100 metres T36	Eduardo Alejandro Jimenez Garcia; Mexico	Oscar Segura; Argentina	Daniel Schapira; Argentina
Men's 100 metres T38	Edson Pinheiro; Brazil	Benjamin Cardozo Sánchez; Mexico	Barry Phelan; Canada
Men's 100 metres T44	Marlon Shirley; United States	Brian Frasure; United States	Jerome Singleton; United States
Men's 100 metres T46	Yohansson Ferreira; Brazil	Antônio Souza; Brazil	Ettiam Calderón; Cuba
Men's 100 metres T53	Ariosvaldo Silva; Brazil	Troy Davis; United States	Jaime Ramirez Valencia; Mexico
Men's 100 metres T54	Juan Ramon Valladares; Venezuela	Gonzalo Valdovinos Gonzalez; Mexico	Freddy Sandoval; Mexico
Men's 200 metres T11	Lucas Prado; Brazil	Adrian Ardiles; Cuba	Felipe Gomes; Brazil
Men's 200 metres T12	Pedro Moraes; Brazil	Julio Alberto Roque Rosabal; Cuba	Josiah Jamison; United States
Men's 200 metres T13	Luis Manuel Galano; Cuba	André Andrade; Brazil	Royal Mitchell; United States
Men's 200 metres T38	Edson Pinheiro; Brazil	Barry Phelan; Canada	José Silva; Brazil
Men's 200 metres T44	Brian Frasure; United States	Jerome Singleton; United States	Ryan Fann; United States
Men's 200 metres T46	Yohansson Ferreira; Brazil	Antônio Souza; Brazil	Donald Kosakowski; United States
Men's 200 metres T53	Troy Davis; United States	Ariosvaldo Silva; Brazil	Jesus Alfredo Aguilar; Venezuela
Men's 200 metres T54	Gonzalo Valdovinos Gonzalez; Mexico	Fernando Sanchez Nava; Mexico	Erik Hightower; United States
Men's 400 metres T11	Lucas Prado; Brazil	Adrian Ardiles; Cuba	Hilário Neto; Brazil
Men's 400 metres T12	Pedro Moraes; Brazil	Josiah Jamison; United States	Júlio Souza; Brazil
Men's 400 metres T13	Royal Mitchell; United States	Jose Luis Sanchez; Venezuela	Freddy Durruthy; Cuba
Men's 400 metres T46	Yohansson Ferreira; Brazil	Emicarlo Souza; Brazil	Samuel Colmonares; Venezuela
Men's 400 metres T53	Ariosvaldo Silva; Brazil	Jaime Ramirez Valencia; Mexico	Austin Snyder; United States
Men's 400 metres T54	Fernando Sanchez Nava; Mexico	Juan Valladares; Venezuela	Freddy Sandoval; Mexico
Men's 800 metres T11/12	Jason Dunkerley; Canada	Carlos Silva; Brazil	Tomas Atilio Rodriguez Martinez; El Salvador
Men's 800 metres T13	Lázaro Rashid Aguilar; Cuba	Jose Luis Sanchez; Venezuela	Peter Gottwald; United States
Men's 800 metres T46	Samuel Colmanares; Venezuela	Ernesto Blanco Ravelo; Cuba	Emicarlo Souza; Brazil
Men's 800 metres T54	Saul Mendoza Hernandez; Mexico	Alejandro Maldonado; Argentina	Aaron Gordian Martinez; Mexico
Men's 1500 metres T11	Jason Dunkerley; Canada	Carlos Silva; Brazil	Nicolas Ledezma; Mexico
Men's 1500 metres T12	Odair Santos; Brazil	Elkin Serna; Colombia	Carlos Eliecer Cuascota; Ecuador
Men's 1500 metres T13	Lázaro Rashid Aguilar; Cuba	Jose Luis Sanchez; Venezuela	Yunieski Abreu; Cuba
Men's 1500 metres T46	Mario Santillan Hernandez; Mexico	Tito Sena; Brazil	José Alecrim; Brazil
Men's 1500 metres T54	Saul Mendoza Hernandez; Mexico	Aaron Gordian Martinez; Mexico	Alejandro Maldonado; Argentina
Men's 5000 metres T11	Luis Zapien Rosas; Mexico	Carlos Silva; Brazil	Christiano Farias; Brazil
Men's 5000 metres T12	Odair Santos; Brazil	Alex Mendonça; Brazil	Diosmani González; Cuba
Men's 5000 metres T13	Lázaro Rashid Aguilar; Cuba	Said Gomez; Panama	Jean Subero; Venezuela
Men's 5000 metres T46	Mario Santillan Hernandez; Mexico	Tito Sena; Brazil	Ozivam Bonfim; Brazil
Men's 5000 metres T54	Saul Mendoza Hernandez; Mexico	Aaron Gordian Martinez; Mexico	Alejandro Maldonado; Argentina
Men's 10,000 metres T11	Luis Zapien Rosas; Mexico	Christiano Farias; Brazil	Constantino Angeles Martínez; Mexico
Men's 10,000 metres T12	Odair Santos; Brazil	Diosmany González; Cuba	Alex Mendonça; Brazil
Men's long jump F11-13	Luis Felipe Gutiérrez; Cuba	Yohanni Lastre Hechavarría; Cuba	Elexis Gillette; United States
Men's long jump F42/44/46	Jeremy Campbell; United States	Ettiam Calderón; Cuba	André Oliveira; Brazil
Men's shot put F11/12/13	Sebastián Baldassarri; Argentina	Sergio Paz; Argentina	Jorge Godoy; Argentina
Men's shot put F32-34/52	Kyle Pettey; Canada	Robert Hughes; Canada	Carlos Leon; United States
Men's shot put F35-38	James Shaw; Canada	Paulo Souza; Brazil	Leandro Ricci; Argentina
Men's shot put F40/42/44	Scott Danberg; United States	Gerdan Fonseca; Cuba	Matthew Brown; United States
Men's shot put F53-55	Scott Winkler; United States	Mauro Máximo de Jésus; Mexico	Erick Figueredo González; Cuba
Men's shot put F56-58	Alexis Pizarro; Puerto Rico	Enrique Sanchez; Mexico	Leonardo Díaz Aldana; Cuba
Men's discus throw F11-13	Jorge Godoy; Argentina	Sebastián Baldassarri; Argentina	Sergio Paz; Argentina
Men's discus throw F32-34/51-53	Alphanso Cunningham; Jamaica	Carlos Leon; United States	Horacio Tomas Bascioni; Argentina
Men's discus throw F35-38	Paulo Souza; Brazil	James Shaw; Canada	Franklin Oquendo Fonseca; Cuba
Men's discus throw F42/44	Matthew Brown; United States	Gerdan Fonseca; Cuba	Marco Borges; Brazil
Men's discus throw F54-56	Leonardo Díaz Aldana; Cuba	Tanto Campbell; Jamaica	Scott Winkler; United States
Men's discus throw F57/58	Leonardo Amâncio; Brazil	Fernando del Rosario González; Mexico	Alexis Pizarro; Puerto Rico
Men's javelin throw F11-13	Jorge Yaniel Delgado Brown; Cuba	Dorian Machado; Venezuela	Daniel Alvarez; Argentina
Men's javelin throw F33/34/52/53	Mauro Máximo de Jésus; Mexico	Adrian Paz Velazquez; Mexico	Alphanso Cunningham; Jamaica
Men's javelin throw F42/44	Juan Miguel Ramos Sanjudo; Cuba	Pompilio Falconi Alvarez; Peru	Marco Borges; Brazil
Men's javelin throw F54-58	Luis Alberto Zepeda Félix; Mexico	Alexis Pizarro; Puerto Rico	Efrain Ortiz Roman; Puerto Rico

=== Women's events ===
Event	Gold	Silver	Bronze
Women's 100 metres T11	Terezinha Guilhermina; Brazil	Alberlis Torres; Venezuela	Gracia Sosa; Argentina
Women's 100 metres T13	Omara Durand; Cuba	Sirlene Guilhermino; Brazil	Joana Silva; Brazil
Women's 100 metres T38	Jenifer Santos; Brazil	Sabra Hawkes; United States	Rachelle Renaud; United States
Women's 100 metres T46	Yunidis Castillo; Cuba	April Holmes; United States	Sheila Finder; Brazil
Women's 100 metres T53	Anjali Forber-Pratt; United States	Margaret Redden; United States	Evelyn Enciso Cervantes; Mexico
Women's 200 metres T11	Terezinha Guilhermina; Brazil	Ádria Santos; Brazil	Irene Delgado; Venezuela
Women's 200 metres T13	Omara Durand; Cuba	Joana Silva; Brazil	Maria José Alves; Brazil
Women's 200 metres T38	Sabra Hawkes; United States	Jenifer Santos; Brazil	Megan Muscat; Canada
Women's 200 metres T46	Yunidis Castillo; Cuba	Sheila Finder; Brazil	Stefanie Reid; Canada
Women's 200 metres T53	Anjali Forber-Pratt; United States	Margaret Redden; United States	Evelyn Enciso Cervantes; Mexico
Women's 400 metres T13	Omara Durand; Cuba	Terezinha Guilhermina; Brazil	Indayana Martins; Brazil
Women's 400 metres T54	Jessica Matassa; Canada	Gloria Sanchez Alcantar; Mexico	Anjali Forber-Pratt; United States
Women's 800 metres T13	Sirlene Guilhermino; Brazil	Ádria Santos; Brazil	Claudia Paulina Mosso Arcos; Colombia
Women's 800 metres T54	Jessica Matassa; Canada	Ariadne Hernandez Rodriguez; Mexico	Evelyn Enciso Cervantes; Mexico
Women's long jump F12/13	Joana Silva; Brazil	Indyana Martins; Brazil	Sirlene Guilhermino; Brazil
Women's long jump F42/44	Perla Patricia Bustamante Corona; Mexico	Stefanie Reid; Canada	Andrea Holmes; Canada
Women's shot put F32-34/52-54	Robyn Stawski; United States	Leticia Torres; Mexico	Dora Elia García Estrada; Mexico
Women's shot put F35-38	Kris Vriend; Canada	Shirlene Coelho; Brazil	Perla Muñoz; Argentina
Women's shot put F55-58	Angeles Ortiz; Mexico	Catalina Rosales Montiel; Mexico	Roseane Santos; Brazil
Women's discus throw F32-34/51-54	Estela Salas; Mexico	Sônia Gouveia; Brazil	Robyn Stawski; United States
Women's discus throw F35-38	Kris Vriend; Canada	Shirlene Coelho; Brazil	Perla Muñoz; Argentina
Women's discus throw F55-58	Roseane Santos; Brazil	Catalina Rosales Montiel; Mexico	Sylvia Grant; Jamaica
Women's javelin throw F33/34/52/53	Esther Rivera Robles; Mexico	Estela Salas; Mexico	Sônia Gouveia; Brazil
Women's javelin throw F35-38	Shirlene Coelho; Brazil	Perla Muñoz; Argentina	Rosenei Herrera; Brazil
Women's javelin throw F54/55/56/57/58	Jeny Velazco Reyes; Mexico	Sylvia Grant; Jamaica	Dora Elia García Estrada; Mexico
