= Athletics at the 2004 Summer Paralympics – Women's shot put F40 =

Women's Shot Put F40 at the XII Paralympic Games
- Venue: Athens Olympic Stadium
- Dates: 26 September 2004
- Competitors: 9 from 7 nations
- Winning distance: 7.47

Medalists
1st place, gold medalist(s)		Afrah Gomdi	Tunisia
2nd place, silver medalist(s)		Laila El Garaa	Morocco
3rd place, bronze medalist(s)		Enna Ben Abidi	Tunisia

The Women's shot put F40 event for les autres (athletes with dwarfism) was held at the 2004 Summer Paralympics in the Athens Olympic Stadium. It was won by Afrah Gomdi, representing Tunisia.

26 Sept. 2004, 17:00

Rank	Athlete	Result	Notes
1st place, gold medalist(s)	Afrah Gomdi (TUN)	7.47	WR
2nd place, silver medalist(s)	Laila El Garaa (MAR)	6.97	
3rd place, bronze medalist(s)	Enna Ben Abidi (TUN)	6.88	
4	Kim Minett (GBR)	6.69	
5	Petra Hoemmen (GER)	6.64	
6	Karen Mueller (GER)	6.07	
7	Jill Kennedy (USA)	5.74	
8	Patricia Marquis (FRA)	5.01	
9	Julie Iles (AUS)	4.79	
