= Warrior Champions: From Baghdad to Beijing =

2009 film

- Directed by: Craig Renaud, Brent Renaud
- Cinematography: Craig Renaud, Brent Renaud
- Edited by: Craig Renaud, Brent Renaud, Eddie Stein
- Music by: Amman Abbasi
- Release date: June 15, 2009
- Running time: 1h 20m
- Country: USA
- Language: English

Warrior Champions: From Baghdad to Beijing is a 2009 American documentary film directed by the Renaud Brothers. The films tells the individual stories of four American soldiers who lost limbs or suffered paralysis in the Iraq War, and of their training to try for a position on the 2008 U.S. Paralympic team and their journey to the 2008 Summer Paralympics in Beijing.

== Athletes ==
The films features:

- Kortney Clemons (track and field)
- Carlos Leon (shot put)
- Melissa Stockwell (swimming)
- Scott Winkler (shot put)

== Awards ==
- Best Political Feature, SINY Film Festival 2010
- Documentary Prize, Naples International Film Festival 2010

== Festival selections ==
- Austin Film Festival, 2009
- Hot Springs Documentary Film Festival, 2009
- Tiburon International Film Festival, 2010
- Cleveland International Film Festival, 2010
- Newport Beach Film Festival, 2010
- ReelAbilities Disabilities Film Festival, 2010
