= Athletics at the 2004 Summer Paralympics – Women's discus throw F40 =

Women's Discus F40 at the XII Paralympic Games
- Venue: Athens Olympic Stadium
- Dates: 24 September 2004
- Competitors: 8 from 6 nations
- Winning distance: 27.08

Medalists
1st place, gold medalist(s)		Enna Ben Abidi	Tunisia
2nd place, silver medalist(s)		Afrah Gomdi	Tunisia
3rd place, bronze medalist(s)		Jill Kennedy	United States

The Women's discus throw F40 event for les autres (athletes with dwarfism) was held at the 2004 Summer Paralympics in the Athens Olympic Stadium. It was won by Enna Ben Abidi, representing Tunisia.

24 Sept. 2004, 10:45

Rank	Athlete	Result	Notes
1st place, gold medalist(s)	Enna Ben Abidi (TUN)	27.08	WR
2nd place, silver medalist(s)	Afrah Gomdi (TUN)	25.73	
3rd place, bronze medalist(s)	Jill Kennedy (USA)	19.23	
4	Karen Mueller (GER)	18.74	
5	Petra Hoemmen (GER)	17.61	
6	Julie Iles (AUS)	15.90	
7	Kim Minett (GBR)	15.02	
8	Patricia Marquis (FRA)	14.98	
