= Athletics at the 2004 Summer Paralympics – Women's javelin throw F40 =

Women's Javelin F40 at the XII Paralympic Games
- Venue: Athens Olympic Stadium
- Dates: 22 September 2004
- Competitors: 7 from 6 nations
- Winning distance: 32.05

Medalists
1st place, gold medalist(s)		Afrah Gomdi	Tunisia
2nd place, silver medalist(s)		Enna Ben Abidi	Tunisia
3rd place, bronze medalist(s)		Jill Kennedy	United States

The Women's javelin throw F40 event for les autres (athletes with dwarfism) was held at the 2004 Summer Paralympics in the Athens Olympic Stadium. It was won by Afrah Gomdi, representing Tunisia.

22 Sept. 2004, 17:00

Rank	Athlete	Result	Notes
1st place, gold medalist(s)	Afrah Gomdi (TUN)	32.05	WR
2nd place, silver medalist(s)	Enna Ben Abidi (TUN)	24.68	
3rd place, bronze medalist(s)	Jill Kennedy (USA)	23.07	
4	Laila El Garaa (MAR)	22.36	
5	Petra Hoemmen (GER)	14.07	
6	Julie Iles (AUS)	13.49	
7	Patricia Marquis (FRA)	12.59	
