= Úrsulo Galván =

- Municipality and town
- Location within Veracruz Location within Mexico
- Coordinates: 19°24′N 96°18′W
- Country: Mexico
- State: Veracruz

Area
  - Total: 123.92 km^{2} (47.85 sq mi)
- Elevation: 7 m (23 ft)

Population (2010 census)
  - Total: 29,005
  - Density: 234.06/km^{2} (606.22/sq mi)
- Time zone: UTC-6 (Central)
- Website: https://www.ursulogalvan.gob.mx

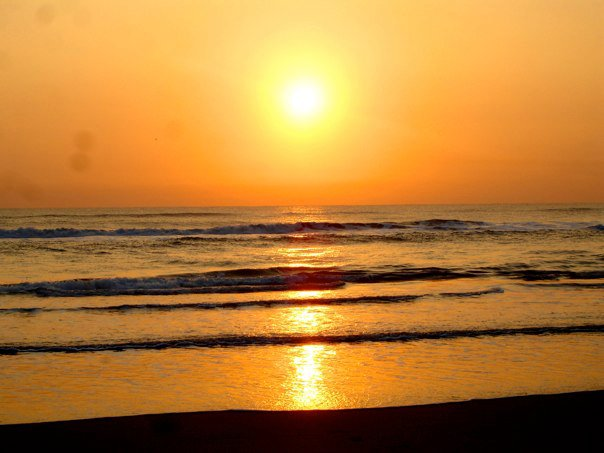
Atardecer, Chachalacas, Veracruz

Úrsulo Galván is a municipality located in the central coastal zone of the Mexican state of Veracruz, about 76 km from the state capital Xalapa. It has a surface of 123.92 km^{2}. The name of this municipality is in honor of Úrsulo Galván Reyes, an early 20th-century agrarian activist and revolutionary.

== Geography ==
The municipality of Úrsulo Galván is bordered to the north by Actopan, to the east by Gulf of Mexico and to the south by Puente Nacional.

The weather in Úrsulo Galván is hot and wet all year with rains in summer and autumn.

== History ==
Gilberto Ortiz Parra, precandidate for mayor (MORENA) and two police officers died on February 11, 2021, after being shot.

== Agriculture ==
It produces principally maize, beans, watermelon, sugarcane, rice and green chile.

== Celebrations ==
In November there is a celebration in honor of San Carlos, patron of the town, and in December that in honor of the Virgin of Guadalupe.

== See also ==
- Playa Chachalacas
- Cempoala, an important Mesoamerican archaeological site located in the municipality
