= 2018 World Para Athletics European Championships – Women's javelin throw =

The women's javelin throw at the 2018 World Para Athletics European Championships was held at the Friedrich-Ludwig-Jahn-Sportpark in Berlin from 20–26 August. 5 classification finals are held in all over this event.

== Medalists ==
| Event | Gold | | Silver | | Bronze | |
|---|---|---|---|---|---|---|
| F13 | Natalija Eder (AUT) | 34.77 | Laura Rus Martinez (ESP) | 24.84 | Rose Wélépa (FRA) | 22.74 |
| F34 | Marjaana Heikkinen (FIN) | 18.79 | Frances Herrmann (GER) | 17.47 | Lucyna Kornobys (POL) | 16.22 F33 WR |
| F46 | Hollie Arnold (GBR) | 40.15 CR | Katarzyna Piekart (POL) | 32.59 | Saška Sokolov (SRB) | 32.17 |
| F54 | Yuliya Nezhura (BLR) | 11.98 | Rozalie Molovska (CZE) | 11.15 | Iana Lebiedieva (UKR) | 11.15 |
| F56 | Diāna Dadzīte (LAT) | 26.36 CR | Martina Willing (GER) | 21.34 | Daniela Todorova (BUL) | 19.90 |
WR world record | AR area record | CR championship record | GR games record | NR national record | OR Olympic record | PB personal best | SB season best | WL world leading (in a given season)

== See also ==
- List of IPC world records in athletics
