= 2015 IPC Athletics World Championships – Women's javelin throw =

The women's javelin throw at the 2015 IPC Athletics World Championships was held at the Suheim Bin Hamad Stadium in Doha from 22–31 October.

== Medalists ==
Event	Gold		Silver		Bronze	
F11	Zhong Huimin; China	25.31	Ness Murby; Canada	22.74	Zhang Liangmin; China	20.86
F13	Irada Aliyeva (F12); Azerbaijan	44.18 WR	Anna Sorokina (F12); Russia	42.66 PB	Zhao Yuping (F12); China	41.26 AR
F34	Zou Lijuan; China	20.98 PB	Lucyna Kornobys; Poland	18.15 SB	Frances Herrmann; Germany	16.82 SB
F37	Shirlene Coelho; Brazil	37.03 CR	Mi Na; China	29.70 PB	Jia Qianqian; China	28.95
F46	Hollie Arnold; Great Britain	40.53 CR	Katarzyna Piekart; Poland	39.28 SB	Holly Robinson; New Zealand	38.18 PB
F54	Hania Aidi; Tunisia	18.86 WR	Yang Liwan; China	18.50	Ntombizanele Situ; South Africa	16.36
F56	Martina Willing (T56); Germany	22.44	Raissa Rocha Machado (T56); Brazil	18.82	Daniela Todorova (F55); Bulgaria	18.30
WR world record | AR area record | CR championship record | GR games record | NR national record | OR Olympic record | PB personal best | SB season best | WL world leading (in a given season)

== See also ==
- List of IPC world records in athletics
