= Brent Renaud =

American journalist and filmmaker (1971–2022)

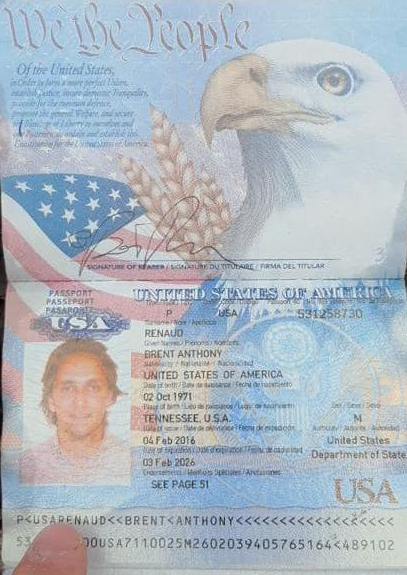
- Renaud's passport with photograph of him in 2007
- Born: October 2, 1971; Memphis, Tennessee, U.S.
- Died: March 13, 2022; Irpin, Ukraine
- Cause of death: Gunshot wounds during the battle of Irpin
- Education: Southern Methodist University, Columbia University
- Occupations: Journalist, filmmaker
- Awards: Nieman Fellowship (2019); Peabody Awards (2015)
- Website: www.renaudbrothers.com

Brent Anthony Renaud (October 2, 1971 – March 13, 2022) was an American journalist, documentary filmmaker, and photojournalist. Renaud worked with his brother Craig to produce films for outlets such as HBO and Vice News, and was a former contributor to The New York Times. According to Ukrainian officials, he was killed on March 13, 2022, by Russian soldiers while covering the Russian invasion of Ukraine in Irpin, a city near Kyiv.

== Life and career ==
Renaud was born in Memphis, Tennessee, and raised in Little Rock, Arkansas. His mother, Georgann Freasier, was a social worker, and his father, Louis Renaud, was a salesman. Renaud earned his bachelor's degree in English literature from Southern Methodist University and a master's degree in sociology from Columbia University.

He lived and worked in Little Rock and New York City. In collaboration with his brother Craig, Brent Renaud produced a series of films and television programs, mostly focusing on humanistic stories from the world's hot spots. From 2004 to 2005, the Renaud brothers filmed the Discovery Channel series Off to War, which covered Arkansas reservists in the Iraqi conflict and their families.

The brothers also covered the wars in Iraq and Afghanistan, the 2010 earthquake in Haiti, the political crises in Egypt and Libya, conflicts in Africa, Mexican drug war, and the refugee crisis in Central America. They won several awards in television and journalism, including two DuPont-Columbia Awards and a Peabody Award in 2015 for their video series "Last Chance High." The brothers directed the documentary Meth Storm, released in 2017 by HBO Documentary Films. In 2019, Renaud was appointed a visiting professor at the University of Arkansas. Renaud was a 2019 Nieman Fellow. Together with his brother, he was a grantee of the Pulitzer Center. They also founded the Little Rock Film Festival. Co-producer for the documentary series Life of Crime: 1984–2020, which was also nominated for a Peabody Award in 2021.

Renaud was diagnosed as autistic as an adult.

== Death ==
According to Ukrainian officials, Renaud was shot and killed by Russian soldiers in Irpin, Kyiv Oblast, Ukraine, while covering the 2022 Russian invasion of Ukraine. Two other journalists were injured and taken to a hospital. One of them, Juan Arredondo, later said in a video published by an Italian journalist on Twitter that the journalists were filming civilians evacuating over one of the bridges in Irpin when they were targeted by soldiers who shot Renaud in the neck. It was the first reported death of a foreign journalist in the 2022 war in Ukraine.

Craig Renaud, his younger brother and collaborator, recovered Brent’s body and later released a film called Armed Only with a Camera: The Life and Death of Brent Renaud, chronicling the years he and his brother spent covering some of the world’s most dangerous conflicts. It was available for streaming in October 2025 on HBO Max.

== Filmography ==
- 2009: Warrior Champions: From Baghdad to Beijing, documentary film, directed by Brent and Craig Renaud
- 2004: Off to War, series
- 2005: Dope Sick Love, documentary film, directed by Felicia Conte, Brent Renaud, and Craig Renaud
- 2007: Little Rock Central: 50 Years Later, documentary film
- 2011: Surviving Haiti's Earthquake: Children
- 2013: Arming the Mexican Cartels
- 2015: Last Chance High, series
- 2017: Meth Storm
- 2018: Shelter, documentary film
- 2025: Armed Only with a Camera: The Life and Death of Brent Renaud, documentary film
