= Scott Winkler =

American Paralympic athlete

Personal information
- Born: 24 January 1973 (age 53) Pittsburgh, United States

Sport
- Sport: Paralympic athletics
- Disability class: F54
- Events: Discus throw Shot put
Medal record
Representing United States
World Championships
Bronze medal – third place	2013 Lyon	Shot put F54/55
Parapan American Games
Gold medal – first place	2007 Rio de Janeiro	Shot put F53-55
Gold medal – first place	2011 Guadalajara	Shot put F54/55/56
Bronze medal – third place	2007 Rio de Janeiro	Discus throw F54-56
Bronze medal – third place	2011 Guadalajara	Discus throw F54/55/56

Scott Winkler (born January 24, 1973) is an American Paralympic track and field athlete who competes in men's shot put and discus throw.

Winkler is a United States Army veteran who was paralyzed below the chest in Tikrit, Iraq in 2003 after he fell off a truck while holding 50 pounds of ammunition.

He won a gold medal and set a new world record mark for class F54 with a throw of 10.23 metres and 1053 points while competing in the men's shot put at the 2007 Parapan American Games.

He also competed for Team USA at the 2008 Summer Paralympics where he placed fifth in the shot put F55/56 event.

The documentary film Warrior Champions: From Baghdad to Beijing features Winkler's individual story as he trained to try for a berth on the 2008 U.S. Paralympic team.

Scott currently still competes in throwing shot put. He also is the shotput and discus coach at Harlem High School in Harlem, Georgia. All the while running a successful farm, Winkler Farms.
