= James Shaw (athlete) =

Canadian Paralympic athlete

Medal record

Paralympic athletics

Representing Canada

Paralympic Games
| Gold medal – first place | 1996 Atlanta | Discus throw F34/37 |
| Gold medal – first place | 1996 Atlanta | Shot put F34/37 |
| Gold medal – first place | 2000 Sydney | Discus throw F38 |
| Bronze medal – third place | 1996 Atlanta | Javelin throw F34/37 |

Parapan American Games
| Gold medal – first place | 2007 Rio de Janeiro | Shot put F35-38 |

James Shaw is a paralympic athlete from Canada competing mainly in category F38 throwing events.

James has competed in three Paralympics. In 1996 he won gold in both the F34/37 discus and shot and bronze in the javelin. For the 2000 Summer Paralympics he concentrated on the discus and won his second gold medal, this time in the F38 class. 2004 saw him compete in the discus and shot put but was unable to medal in either.
