= Carlos Leon (athlete) =

American Paralympic track and field athlete

Personal information
- Born: 1 November 1984 (age 41) North Lauderdale, United States

Sport
- Sport: Paralympic athletics
- Disability class: T53
Medal record
Representing United States
Parapan American Games
Silver medal – second place	2007 Rio de Janeiro	Discus throw F32-34/51-53
Bronze medal – third place	2007 Rio de Janeiro	Shot put F32-34/52

Carlos Leon (born November 1, 1984) is an American Paralympic track and field athlete who competes in men's shot put. He competed at the 2008 Summer Paralympics.

== Military career ==
Leon was a United States Marine Corps veteran who had a traumatic diving accident in 2005 which resulted in quadriplegia.

The documentary film Warrior Champions: From Baghdad to Beijing features Leon's individual story as he trained to try for a berth on the 2008 U.S. Paralympic team.
