= Aziza Hussein =

Egyptian Paralympic athlete

Medal record

Paralympic athletics

Representing Egypt

Paralympic Games
Bronze medal – third place	2004 Athens	Javelin Throw - F56-58

Aziza Hussein is a Paralympian athlete from Egypt competing mainly in category F56-58 javelin throw events.

She competed in the 2004 Summer Paralympics in Athens, Greece. There she won a bronze medal in the women's F56-58 javelin throw event.
