= Marjaana Heikkinen =

Finnish Paralympic athlete (born 1967)

Personal information
- Nationality: Finnish
- Born: 19 April 1967 (age 59) Kuopio, Finland
- Height: 175 cm (69 in)

Sport
- Sport: track and field
- Disability: Spinal cord injuries
- Disability class: T34
- Event(s): Shot put Javelin throw
- Club: Siilinjarven Ponnistus
- Coached by: Kimmo Kinnunen
Medal record
Women's athletics
Representing Finland
Paralympic Games
Silver medal – second place	2016 Rio de Janeiro	Javelin - F33/34/52/53
Bronze medal – third place	2012 London	Javelin - F33/34/52/53
Bronze medal – third place	2020 Tokyo	Javelin - F33/34/52/53
World Championships
Silver medal – second place	2013 Lyon	Javelin F33/34
Bronze medal – third place	2023 Paris	Javelin F34
European Championships
Gold medal – first place	2016 Grosseto	Javelin F34
Gold medal – first place	2018 Berlin	Javelin F34
Silver medal – second place	2012 Stadskanaal	Javelin F33/34/52/53
Bronze medal – third place	2012 Stadskanaal	Shot put F34
Bronze medal – third place	2014 Swansea	Javelin F34

Marjaana Heikkinen (née Huovinen; born 19 April 1967) is a Finnish Paralympic athlete competing in F34 classification throwing events.

== Career ==
Heikkinen represented Finland at the 2012 Summer Paralympic Games in London, entering the javelin throw and the shot put. She finished fourth in the shot and in the javelin, which stretched over four classifications, she threw a distance of 19.47 metres to win the bronze medal. As well as Paralympic success, Heikkinen has won medals at both World and European Championships, including a javelin gold at the 2016 IPC Athletics European Championships in Grosseto.
