= Yousra Ben Jemaa =

Tunisian Paralympic athlete

Personal information
- Nationality: Tunisian
- Born: August 22, 1986 (age 40) Tunisia

Sport
- Sport: Athletics (sport)
- Event: Women's 100m - T34; Women's 200m - T34; Women's Javelin Throw - F33/34/52/53
- Coached by: Ben Zina Mohamed Ali
Medal record
Paralympic athletics
Representing Tunisia
All-Africa Games
Gold medal – first place	2011 Maputo	Discus Throw F32/33/34
Paralympic Games
Bronze medal – third place	2008 Beijing	Discus Throw - F32-34/51-53

Yousra Ben Jemaa (born August 22, 1986) is a Paralympian athlete from Tunisia competing mainly in category F32-34/51-53 throwing events.

She competed in the 2008 Summer Paralympics in Beijing, China. There she won a bronze medal in the women's F32-34/51-53 discus throw event. She also competed in the women's F33/34/42/53 javelin throw and women's F32-34/52/53 shot put.
