= Azam Khodayari =

Iranian Paralympic athlete

Personal information
- Born: 22 June 1980 (age 46) Tehran, Iran

Sport
- Sport: Paralympic athletics
Medal record
Paralympic athletics
Representing Iran
Paralympic Games
Bronze medal – third place	2004 Athens	Discus throw F56/58
World Championships
Gold medal – first place	2006 Assen	Discus throw F57
Asian Para Games
Silver medal – second place	2014 Incheon	Discus throw F57

Azam Khodayari (born 22 June 1980) is a Paralympian athlete from Iran competing mainly in category F56/58 discus throw events. Khodayari was the first Iranian woman to win a medal in athletics at the Paralympics.

She competed in the 2004 Summer Paralympics in Athens, Greece. There she won a bronze medal in the women's F56/58 discus throw event.
