= Jenifer Santos =

Brazilian Paralympic athlete

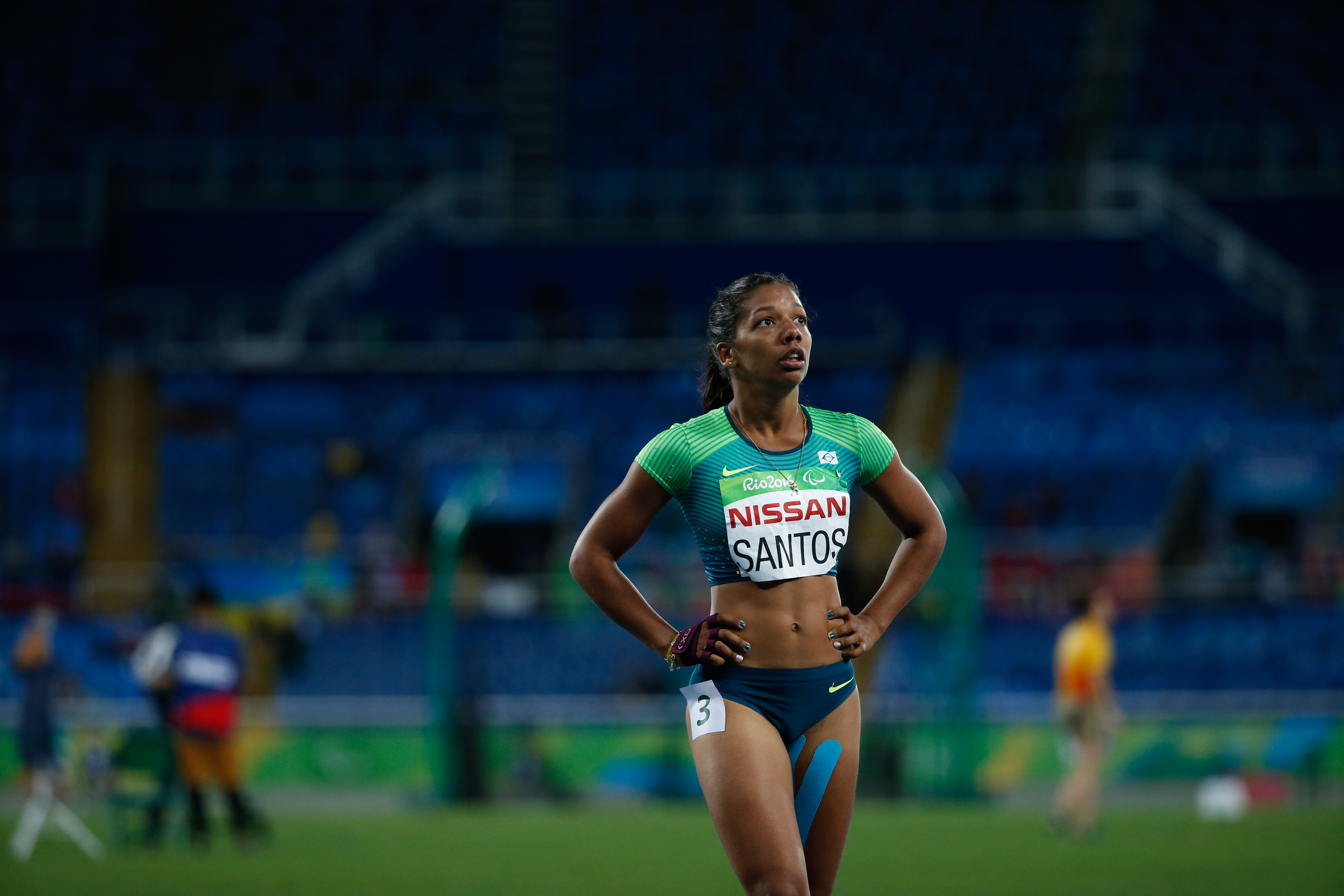
- Santos at 2016 Summer Paralympics

Personal information
- Full name: Jenifer Martins dos Santos
- Born: 30 June 1989 (age 36) Recife, Brazil
- Height: 1.64 m (5 ft 5 in)
- Weight: 57 kg (126 lb)

Sport
- Country: Brazil
- Sport: Paralympic athletics
- Disability: Cerebral palsy
- Disability class: T38
- Event(s): 100 metres 200 metres Long jump
Medal record
Paralympic athletics
Representing Brazil
Parapan American Games
| Gold medal – first place | 2007 Rio de Janeiro | 100m T38 |
| Gold medal – first place | 2011 Guadalajara | 100m T38 |
| Gold medal – first place | 2011 Guadalajara | 200m T38 |
| Silver medal – second place | 2007 Rio de Janeiro | 200m T38 |
| Silver medal – second place | 2015 Toronto | 100m T38 |
| Silver medal – second place | 2015 Toronto | 200m T38 |
| Silver medal – second place | 2019 Lima | Long jump T36/37/38 |
| Bronze medal – third place | 2019 Lima | 100m T38 |

Jenifer Martins dos Santos (born 30 June 1989) is a Brazilian Paralympic athlete who competes in international elite competitions, she participates in sprinting and long jump events. She is a triple Parapan American Games champion and has competed at the Paralympic Games three times, her highest achievement is finishing in fourth place in the 100m T38 at the 2008 Summer Paralympics.
