= Armed Only with a Camera: The Life and Death of Brent Renaud =

2025 documentary short film by Brent Renaud and Craig Renaud

- Promotional poster
- Directed by: Brent Renaud; Craig Renaud
- Produced by: Brent Renaud; Craig Renaud; Juan Arredondo; Cristof Putzel
- Starring: Brent Renaud; Craig Renaud; Jon Alpert
- Cinematography: Brent Renaud; Craig Renaud; Jon Alpert; Juan Arredondo; Christof Putzel; Stephen Bailey; Andy Sarjahani
- Edited by: Brent Renaud; Craig Renaud; Jon Alpert; Juan Arredondo; Naomi Mizoguchi
- Music by: Bonnie Montgomery; Nathan Mills; Peter Adams; Luca Mattison Tafoya; Jonathan Camps; Nicola Moneta
- Production company: HBO Documentary Films
- Distributed by: HBO Max
- Release date: March 9, 2025 (SXSW)
- Running time: 37 minutes
- Country: United States
- Language: English

Armed Only with a Camera: The Life and Death of Brent Renaud is a 2025 American documentary short film, directed by Brent Renaud and Craig Renaud. It chronicles the years Craig Renaud and his brother Brent Renaud, who was killed on March 13, 2022, spent covering some of the world’s most dangerous conflicts.

It had its world premiere in the Documentary Short Competition at the 2025 South by Southwest Film & TV Festival on March 9. It was released by HBO Documentary Films on HBO Max on October 21. At the 98th Academy Awards, it was nominated for the Best Documentary Short Film.

== Synopsis ==
The film follows the story of American filmmaker and journalist Brent Renaud, who was killed on March 13, 2022, while reporting on the war in Ukraine. After his death, his brother and longtime collaborator, Craig Renaud, brought Brent’s body and his final footage back to their home state of Arkansas. As this journey unfolds, the documentary looks back on the brothers’ years covering dangerous events around the world.

It features vérité footage from their reporting in Iraq with the Arkansas National Guard, the 2010 Haiti earthquake, the conflict in Somalia, migration routes from Honduras to the United States, and Brent’s final work in Ukraine. The film highlights Brent’s commitment to documenting the human cost of war and crisis, showing both the risks he faced and the compassion he brought to his work. Presented as a tribute to Brent and to frontline journalists, the film underscores the importance and growing danger of reporting from conflict zones.

== Cast ==
- Brent Renaud
- Craig Renaud
- Jon Alpert

== Release ==
Armed only with a Camera: The Life and Death of Brent Renaud had its world premiere at the 2025 South by Southwest Film & TV Festival on March 9, 2025 in Documentary Short Competition.

It had its East Coast Premiere in Short program at the DC/DOX on June 15, 2025.

It was presented at the Hot Springs Documentary Film Festival in documentary shorts on October 14, 2025.

It was made available to stream on HBO Max on October 21, 2025.

On November 14, 2025, it was screened in the Short List Shorts: Family Album at Doc NYC along with other three films.

On December 16, 2025, the Academy of Motion Picture Arts and Sciences announced that the film was nominated for Best Documentary Short Film for the 98th Annual Academy Awards.

== Accolades ==
Award	Date of ceremony	Category	Recipient(s)	Result	Ref.
South by Southwest	March 15, 2025	Audience Award Documentary Short	Armed only with a Camera: The Life and Death of Brent Renaud	Won	
Cinema Eye Honors	January 8, 2026	Outstanding Non-Fiction Short	Armed only with a Camera: The Life and Death of Brent Renaud	Shortlisted	
Academy Awards	March 15, 2026	Best Documentary Short Film	Craig Renaud, Juan Arredondo	Nominated	

== Feature adaptation ==
In March 2026, a narrative feature-length film adaptation of the short was announced with Craig Renaud writing the script. The film will be directed by Jay Russell.

== See also ==
- Academy Award for Best Documentary Short Film
- Submissions for Best Documentary Short Academy Award
