= Hania Aidi =

Tunisian Paralympic athlete (born 1977)

Personal information
- Native name: هنية العايدي
- Born: 10 December 1977 (age 48) Sfax, Tunisia
- Years active: 2004–present
- Height: 160 cm (5 ft 3 in)

Sport
- Disability: Spinal cord injury
- Disability class: F54
- Club: Tunisian Federation of Sports for the Disabled, Sfax, TUN
- Coached by: Mohamed Ali Ben Zina
Medal record
Women's para-athletics
Representing Tunisia
Paralympic Games
Silver medal – second place	2008 Beijing	Javelin throw – F54–46
Silver medal – second place	2012 London	Javelin throw – F54–56
Silver medal – second place	2016 Rio de Janeiro	Javelin throw – F54
World Championships
Gold medal – first place	2011 Christchurch	Javelin F54–56
Gold medal – first place	2013 Lyon	Javelin F54–56
Gold medal – first place	2015 Doha	Javelin F54
Silver medal – second place	2017 London	Javelin throw – F54
Bronze medal – third place	2013 Lyon	Shot put F54
African Games
Gold medal – first place	2015 Brazzaville	Javelin F54/56

Hania Aidi (Arabic: هنية العايدي; born 10 December 1977) is a Paralympian athlete from Tunisia competing mainly in category F54 javelin throw events. Aidi has competed at four consecutive Summer Paralympics, winning silver medals at three of the Games. She is also a three time World Championships winner medalist and has held the F54 javelin world record on numerous occasions throughout her career.

== Personal history ==
Aidi was born in Sfax, Tunisia in 1977. She was born able bodied, but suffered permanent spinal injuries after a medical error.

== Athletics career ==
Aidi took up athletics at the age of 26, after she became disabled. Her international debut was at the 2004 Summer Paralympics in Athens, Greece where she represented her country in all three throwing events available to her classification; the F54–55 discus throw, javelin throw and shot put. She failed to progress into the final eight for the shot put and discus, but her distance of 12.22 metres in the javelin saw her acquire enough points to finish just outside the podium positions in fourth.

Two years after Athens, Aidi competed at her first IPC Athletics World Championships. Held in Assen, the 2006 Championships allowed Aidi a chance to compete against the best athletes in the world outside the Paralympics. She competed in two events, the shot put (T54) and the javelin throw (F54–56). She finished fourth in both. Her first international medals were won at the 2008 Summer Paralympics in Beijing. In the shot put she threw 6.81 to finish fourth, but success followed in the javelin where her third round throw of 16.83 not only gave her the silver medal but also set a new world record in the F54 category.

Further international success followed three years later in the buildup to the 2012 Summer Paralympics in London when Aidi travelled to Christchurch in New Zealand to compete at the 2011 IPC Athletics World Championships. There she again focused on the shot put and the javelin, finishing fifth in the shot, but a world record throw of 17.27 in the javelin gave her the gold medal. The following year, at the London Paralympics, Aidi attempted to recreate her form from he World Championships. In the women's javelin throw (T54/55/56) despite exceeding her world record from Christchurch twice with distances of 17.28 and 17.40, she was unable to compete against China's Yang Liwan, who led from the first throw. Aidi still left with the silver medal in the javelin, and added a fifth place in the shot put.

The next year Aidi retook the world record in the javelin, throwing 18.32 metres at the 2013 World Championships in Lyon, pushing her Paralympic rival Yang, into silver medal place. As well as retaining her javelin world title she also took bronze in the shot put. Two years later, in Doha, she extended her world record in the javelin further, recording a distance of 18.86 metres on the way to winning her third consecutive world championships title. Hopes were high for Aidi at the 2016 Summer Paralympics in Rio de Janeiro and she was chosen by her country to be the flag bearer at the opening ceremony. In the final of the F54 javelin Aidi threw 18.88, another personal best, but she was outclassed by Nigeria's Flora Ugwunwa, who managed a world record 20.25 in her first throw, a lead she did not give up. With Aidi in silver position, and South Africa's Ntombizanele Situ in third, all three medals went to African nations.
