= Veronika Foltová =

Czech Paralympic athlete

Personal information
- Born: 21 September 1980 (age 46)
Medal record
Paralympic athletics
Representing Czech Republic
Paralympic Games
Gold medal – first place	2004 Athens	Discus Throw - F35/36/38
Gold medal – first place	2004 Athens	Shot Put - F35/36/38
Silver medal – second place	2004 Athens	Javelin Throw - F35-38

Veronika Foltová (born 21 September 1980) is a Czech Paralympic athlete competing mainly in the F35/36 throwing events.

Foltová competed in the 2004 Summer Paralympics in Athens where she won gold medals in both the discus and shot put and a silver medal in the javelin.
