= Enna Ben Abidi =

Tunisian Paralympic athlete

Medal record

Paralympic athletics

Representing Tunisia

Paralympic Games
Gold medal – first place	2004 Athens	Discus Throw - F40
Silver medal – second place	2004 Athens	Javelin Throw - F40
Bronze medal – third place	2004 Athens	Shot Put - F40

Enna Ben Abidi is a Paralympian athlete from Tunisia competing mainly in category F40 throwing events.

Enna won a complete set of medals in the 2004 Summer Paralympics in Athens, where she won the gold medal in the F40 discus, the silver in the F40 javelin and completed the set with a bronze in the F40 shot put.
