= Katarzyna Piekart =

Polish Paralympic athlete

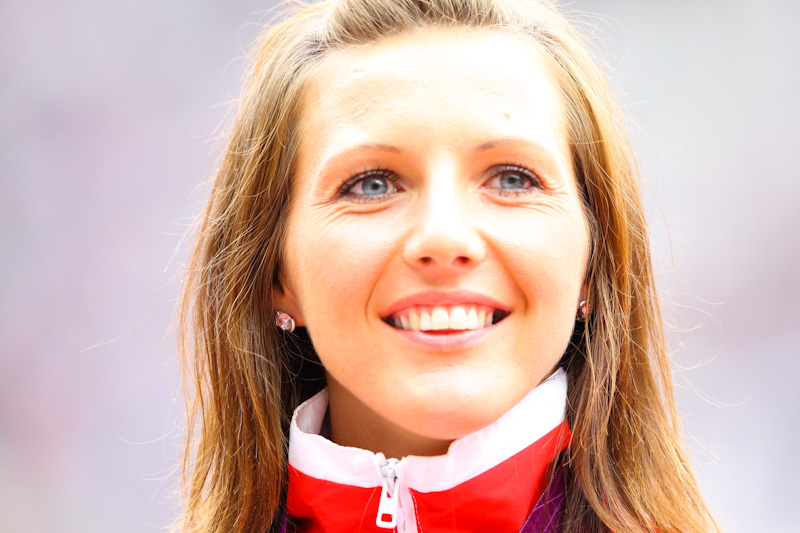
- Piekart

Personal information
- Nationality: Polish
- Born: Katarzyna Piekart; March 5, 1986 (age 40) Siedlce, Poland
- Education: Banking, Finance – Koźminski University

Sport
- Country: Poland
- Sport: Athletics
- Disability class: T/F46
- Club: Start Gorzów Wielkopolski
Medal record
Women's para athletics
Representing Poland
Paralympic Games
Gold medal – first place	2012 London	Javelin throw F46
World Championships
Silver medal – second place	2015 Doha	Javelin throw F46
- Updated on 31 October 2015

Katarzyna Piekart (born 5 March 1986) is a Polish athlete who competes in disability athletics in the T/F46 category. She won the gold medal for the Javelin throw at the 2012 Paralympic Games for her category with a new World Record.
