= Matt Brown (parathlete) =

American track and field parathlete and coach

Matthew S. Brown
- Born: November 24, 1976 (age 49)
- Occupations: High school football and track and field coach Track and field athlete
- Spouse: Olivia Brown
- Parent(s): Charles N. and Janet Ladell Brown

Matthew S. Brown, known as Matt P.F. Brown (born November 24, 1976), is a football and track and field coach at Idalou High School in Idalou in Lubbock County, Texas, who is a gold and bronze winner in the Parapan American Games. Brown's left leg was amputated above the knee because of an accidental industrial explosion on December 20, 2005.

In September 2007, Brown won a gold medal in the discus, having set a record throw of 154 feet 9 inches (47.17 m), and a bronze in the shot put at the 2007 Parapan American Games held in Rio de Janeiro, Brazil. He has also competed in the 2008 Summer Paralympic Games in Beijing, where he finished fourth in the men's discus.

On July 12, 2011, Brown was suspended for three months by the Paralympic team after a United States Anti-Doping Agency test revealed the presence of a marijuana metabolite in his body. He was also made ineligible to participate in official track and field events for a calendar year. He tested positive for marijuana again in a June 2012 test and was again suspended for twelve months.

Brown graduated from Idalou High School, where he played football, basketball, baseball, and competed in track and field. He was an All-State tight end in football, All-District center in basketball, and a two-time state champion in the discus and shot put. He graduated from Wayland Baptist University in Plainview, the seat of Hale County, Texas. He played football at Wayland for two years and was an All-American in track and field there. He now coaches both sports at his alma mater.
