= Fatma Kachroudi =

Tunisian Paralympic athlete

Personal information
- Born: 9 April 1976 (age 50)
Medal record
Women's para-athletics
Representing Tunisia
Paralympic Games
Bronze medal – third place	2004 Athens	Discus Throw - F37

Fatma Kachroudi (born 9 April 1976) is a Paralympian athlete from Tunisia competing mainly in category F37 discus events.

Fatma won a bronze medal in the F37 discus at the 2004 Summer Paralympics in Athens. Four years later in Beijing she missed out on medals in both the F37/38 discus and shot put.
