= Afrah Gomdi =

Tunisian Paralympic athlete

Medal record

Paralympic athletics

Representing Tunisia

Paralympic Games
Gold medal – first place	2004 Athens	Javelin Throw - F40
Gold medal – first place	2004 Athens	Shot Put - F40
Silver medal – second place	2004 Athens	Discus Throw - F40

Afrah Gomdi is a Paralympian athlete from Tunisia competing mainly in category F40 throwing events.

Afrah competed in the 2004 Summer Paralympics in Athens where she won gold medals in both the F40 javelin and shot put and picked up the silver in the F40 discus.
