= Jill Kennedy =

American Paralympic athlete

Medal record

Paralympic athletics

Representing United States

Paralympic Games
Bronze medal – third place	2004 Athens	Discus Throw - F40
Bronze medal – third place	2004 Athens	Javelin Throw - F40

Jill Kennedy is a Paralympian athlete from United States competing mainly in category F40 throws events.

Kennedy has competed in three Paralympics across two sports. Her first appearance was in Sydney in 2000 where she competed in the women's up to 40 kg powerlifting. Four years later, in Athens, she successfully transitioned to the throwing events where she won two bronze medals in the F40 discus and javelin and competed in the shot put. In the 2008 Summer Paralympics in Beijing, she again competed in the shot put and discus but failed to medal in either.
