= Li Ling (Paralympian) =

Chinese Paralympic athlete (born 1967)

Personal information
- Born: 23 July 1967 (age 58)

Sport
- Sport: Paralympic athletics
Medal record
Track and field (athletics)
Representing China
Paralympic Games
Silver medal – second place	2004 Athens	Discus throw F56–58
Silver medal – second place	2004 Athens	Shot put F56–58
World Championships
Silver medal – second place	2006 Assen	Discus throw F57
Asian Para Games
Gold medal – first place	2010 Guangzhou	Discus throw F57-58
Gold medal – first place	2010 Guangzhou	Shot put F57-58

Li Ling (born 23 July 1967) is a paralympic athlete from China competing in category F57 throwing events.

Li Ling competed in three throwing events at the 2004 Summer Paralympics where she won silver in both the discus throw and shot put. She did not compete in the 2008 Summer Paralympics, returning to the 2012 Summer Paralympics without medal success.
