= Roseane Santos =

Brazilian Paralympic athlete

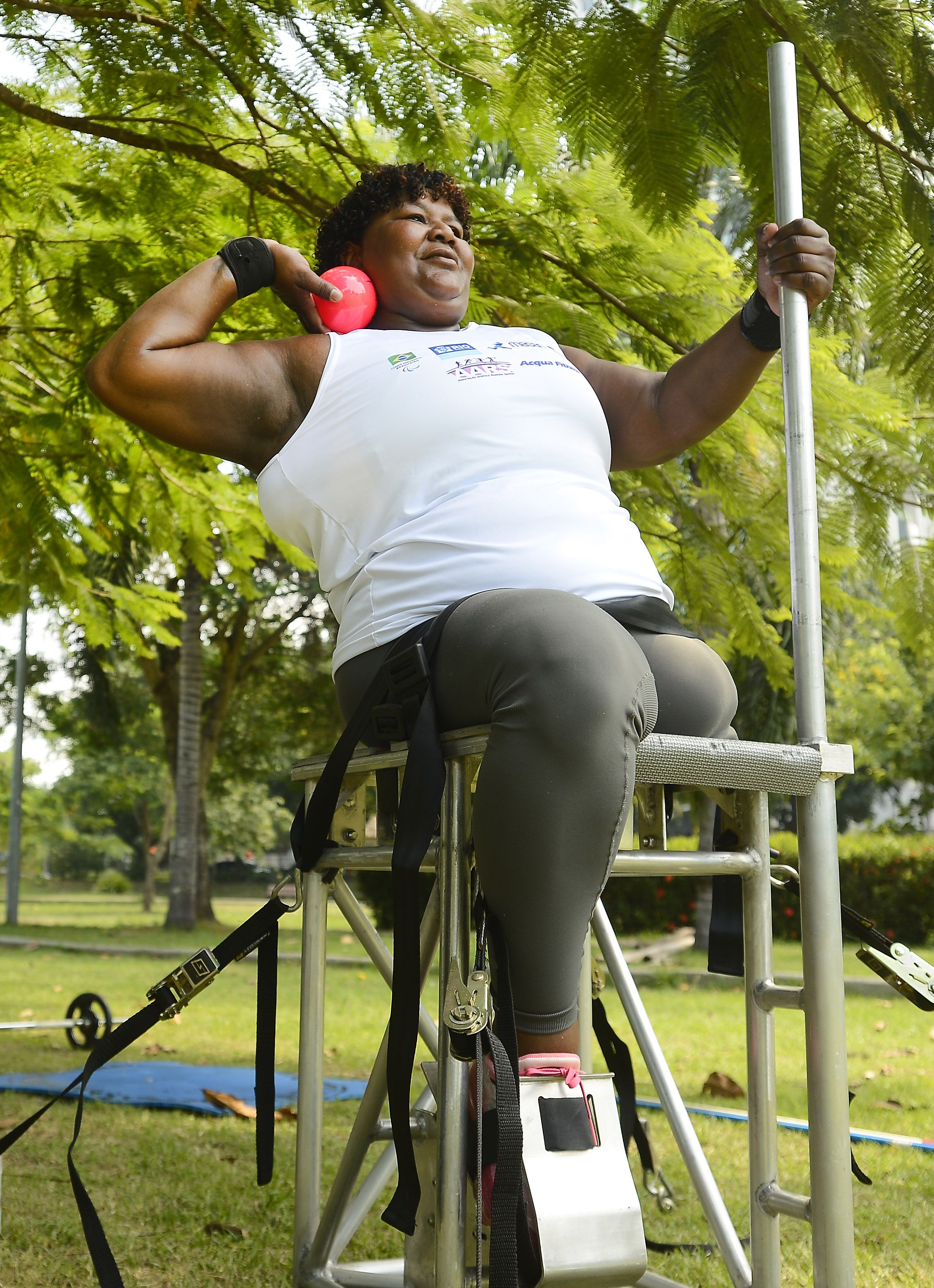
- Santos in 2016

Personal information
- Full name: Roseane Ferreira dos Santos
- Born: 15 October 1971 (age 54) Maceió, Brazil

Sport
- Sport: Para athletics
- Disability class: F58
- Event(s): Discus throw, Shot put
Medal record
Women's para athletics
Representing Brazil
Paralympic Games
Gold medal – first place	2000 Sydney	Discus throw F58
Gold medal – first place	2000 Sydney	Shot put F58
World Championships
Silver medal – second place	2002 Lille	Shot put F58
Silver medal – second place	2006 Assen	Discus throw F58
Bronze medal – third place	2002 Lille	Discus throw F58
Bronze medal – third place	2006 Assen	Shot put F58
Parapan American Games
Gold medal – first place	2007 Rio de Janeiro	Discus throw F55-58
Gold medal – first place	2011 Guadalajara	Discus throw F57/58
Bronze medal – third place	2007 Rio de Janeiro	Shot put F55-58
Bronze medal – third place	2011 Guadalajara	Shot put F57/58
Bronze medal – third place	2015 Toronto	Shot put F56/57

Roseane Ferreira dos Santos (born 15 October 1971) is a paralympic athlete from Brazil competing mainly in category F58 throwing events.

Roseane first competed in the 2000 Summer Paralympics winning a gold in both the discus and shot put and finished fifth in the javelin. Despite competing in the shot and discus in 2004 and 2008 these would prove to be her only medals.
