= Playa Chachalacas =

- City and municipality
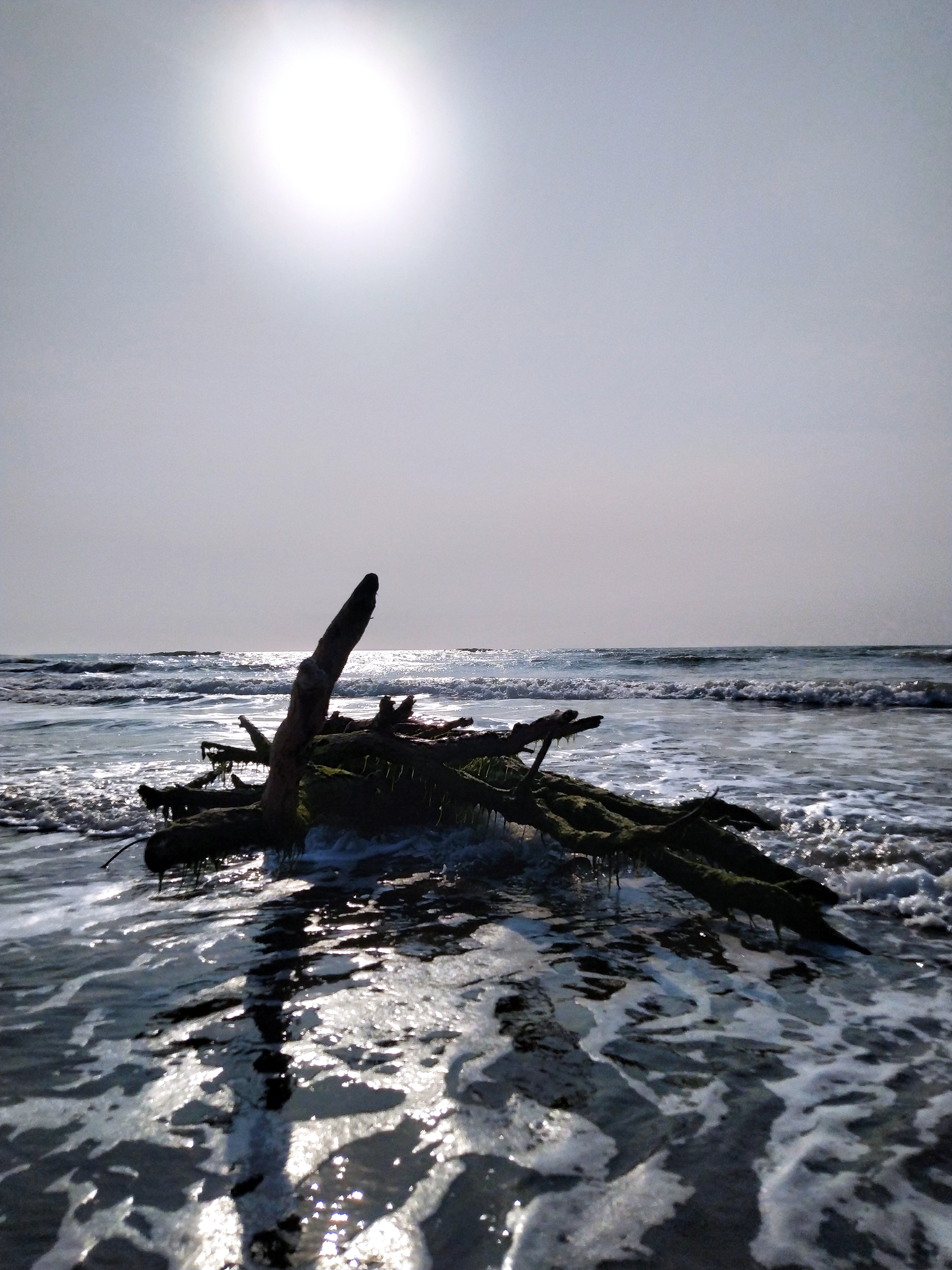
- Tronco de árbol en Playa Chachalacas
- Country: Mexico
- State: Veracruz
- Region: Sotavento Region

Population
  - Total: 1,214
- Time zone: UTC-6 (Central Standard Time)
  - Summer (DST): UTC-5 (Central Daylight Time)

Playa Chachalacas is a small, Mexican beach town located 50 km (31 mi) north of the port of Veracruz. This long beach of fine, packed sand and calm waters is popular for aquatic sports. The town itself has a population of 1,214.
