= Kris Vriend =

Canadian Paralympic athlete

Personal information
- Born: Kris Vriend; 23 June 1972 (age 54) Edmonton, Alberta, Canada
- Height: 1.58 m (5 ft 2 in)
- Weight: 64 kg (141 lb)

Sport
- Country: Canada
- Sport: Paralympic athletics
- Disability: Cerebral palsy
- Disability class: F35
- Coached by: Ian Maplethorpe
Medal record
Paralympic athletics
Representing Canada
Paralympic Games
Bronze medal – third place	1996 Atlanta	Discus throw F35-36
World Championships
Gold medal – first place	1994 Berlin	Shot put F35
Gold medal – first place	2002 Lille	Shot put F35-36
Silver medal – second place	1994 Berlin	Discus throw F35
Silver medal – second place	1994 Berlin	Javelin throw F35
Silver medal – second place	2002 Lille	Discus throw F35-36
Parapan American Games
Gold medal – first place	2007 Rio de Janeiro	Javelin throw F35-38
Gold medal – first place	2007 Rio de Janeiro	Discus throw F35-38

Kris Vriend (born 23 June 1972) is a Canadian retired Paralympic track and field athlete who competed primarily in F35 classification throwing events.

== Early life ==
Vriend attended Edmonton Christian High School in Edmonton, Alberta. On 3 December 1989, at age 17, she was involved in a motor vehicle accident while driving to church. She sustained a severe brain injury, spent approximately one month in a coma, and later underwent rehabilitation to relearn walking and speech. In 1993, Vriend's eligibility for Alberta's Assured Income for the Severely Handicapped (AISH) program became the subject of public attention after her benefits were terminated and subsequently reinstated before a scheduled appeal hearing.

== Athletics career ==
Vriend began competing in para-athletics in the early 1990s. At the 1994 World Track and Field Championships for Athletes with a Disability in Berlin, she won the women's C6 shot put with a throw of 6.16 metres.

She represented Canada at the 1996 Summer Paralympics, winning a bronze medal in the discus throw. She subsequently competed in the 2000 Summer Paralympics, 2004 Summer Paralympics, and 2008 Summer Paralympics. At the 2002 IPC World Athletics Championships in Lille, France, Vriend won the shot put and finished second in the discus. By 2004, she held the world record in her shot put classification with a mark of 8.19 metres, set at the Parapan American Games in Argentina.
