= Marianne Buggenhagen =

East German Paralympic athlete

Medal record

Paralympic athletics

Representing Germany

Paralympic Games
Gold medal – first place	1992 Barcelona	Pentathlon - PW3-4
Gold medal – first place	1992 Barcelona	Discus throw - THW5
Gold medal – first place	1992 Barcelona	Javelin throw - THW5
Gold medal – first place	1992 Barcelona	Shot put - THW5
Gold medal – first place	1996 Atlanta	Discus throw - F53-54
Gold medal – first place	1996 Atlanta	Shot put - F53-54
Gold medal – first place	2000 Sydney	Shot put - F55
Gold medal – first place	2004 Athens	Shot put - F54/55
Gold medal – first place	2008 Beijing	Discus throw - F54-56
Silver medal – second place	2004 Athens	Discus throw - F54/55
Silver medal – second place	2016 Rio de Janeiro	Discus throw - F55
Bronze medal – third place	1996 Atlanta	Javelin throw - F53-54
Bronze medal – third place	2008 Beijing	Shot put - F54-56
Bronze medal – third place	2012 London	Shot put - F54-56

IPC World Championships
Gold medal – first place	2015 Doha	Discus throw F55

IPC European Championships
Gold medal – first place	2014 Swansea	Discus - F55
Gold medal – first place	2016 Grosseto	Discus - F55
Silver medal – second place	2016 Grosseto	Shot put - F55
Bronze medal – third place	2014 Swansea	Shot put - F53/54/55

Marianne Buggenhagen (born 26 May 1953 in Ueckermünde, East Germany) is a Paralympian athlete from Germany competing mainly in throwing events.

== Career history ==
She first competed in the 1992 Summer Paralympics in Barcelona, Spain. There she won four gold medals in discus, javelin, shot put and pentathlon. Then at the 1996 Summer Paralympics in Atlanta, United States she again won the shot and discus and won a bronze in the javelin. The following games in 2000 in Sydney, Australia she yet again won the shot put. At her fourth games in 2004 she won her fourth consecutive shot put title and won a silver in the discus throw. Marianne was one of the few athletes to have competed in Barcelona to also compete in the 2008 Summer Paralympics in Beijing, there she failed to win a fifth shot put managing only to win the bronze medal, but did manage to win the discus throw, her twelfth medal in all of which 9 had been gold.

== Honours ==
There are two schools with her name. One in Buch, the other one in Darlingerode, near "Haus Oehrenfeld".
