= Vladimíra Bujárková =

Czech Paralympic athlete

Personal information
- Born: 13 August 1979 (age 47) Jilemnice
Medal record
Paralympic athletics
Representing Czech Republic
Paralympic Games
Silver medal – second place	2000 Sydney	Discus Throw - F37
Silver medal – second place	2004 Athens	Shot Put - F37/38

Vladimíra Bujárková (born 13 August 1979 in Jilemnice) is a Paralympian athlete from the Czech Republic competing mainly in category F37 shot put and discus events.

Bujárková first competed in the Paralympics at the 2000 Summer Paralympics in Sydney. She competed in the F37 javelin and shot put and won a silver medal in the F37 discus. In Athens at the 2004 Summer Paralympics she couldn't retain a medal position in the discus in the F37/38 class but won a silver in the F37/38 shot put. In the 2008 Summer Paralympics she again competed in the F37/38 shot and discus but this time won no medals.
