= Suely Guimarães =

Brazilian Paralympic athlete

Personal information
- Born: 19 November 1957 (age 68) São José do Belmonte, Brazil

Sport
- Sport: Para athletics
- Disability class: F56
- Event: Discus throw
Medal record
Women's para-athletics
Representing Brazil
Paralympic Games
Gold medal – first place	1992 Barcelona	Discus throw THW7
Gold medal – first place	2004 Athens	Discus throw F56-58
Bronze medal – third place	1996 Atlanta	Discus throw F55-57

Suely Guimarães (born 19 November 1957) is a paralympic athlete from Brazil competing mainly in category F56 throwing events.

== Biography ==
Suely has competed in five Paralympics, winning three medals. Her first games were in 1992 where she competed in all three throws winning the gold medal in the discus. In 1996 she went to Atlanta competing in the shot, javelin and defending her discus title but could only manage a bronze in the discus. Despite competing in all three throws in 2000 it wasn't until 2004 when competing in just the shot and discus that she regained the discus title. Her fifth games came in Beijing in 2008 where she again competed in the shot and discus, but could not add further to her medal tally.
