= Esther Rivera =

Mexican Paralympic athlete (born 1964)

Medal record

Paralympic athletics

Representing Mexico

Paralympic Games
Gold medal – first place	2004 Athens	Javelin throw F33/34/52/53

Parapan American Games
Gold medal – first place	2007 Rio de Janeiro	Javelin throw F33/34/52/53
Gold medal – first place	2011 Guadalajara	Javelin throw F33/34/52/53
Silver medal – second place	2015 Toronto	Javelin throw F53/54

Esther Rivera Robles (born 30 July 1964 in Ciudad Obregón, Sonora) is a Mexican Paralympian athlete competing mainly in javelin events.

Robles was the gold medalist in the Women's F33/34/52/53 javelin in the 2004 Summer Paralympics in Athens. She attempted to defend this title in Beijing in 2008 but was ultimately unsuccessful coming away with nothing.

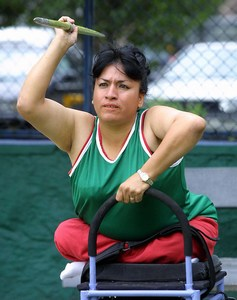
Esther Rivera Robles during the Parapan American Games, 2011

At the 2007 Parapan American Games, Robles set the world record for the F53 class in javelin with a distance of 11.87 m.
