= Beverly Mashinini =

South African Paralympic athlete

Medal record

Paralympic athletics

Representing South Africa

Paralympic Games
Bronze medal – third place	2004 Athens	Javelin Throw - F35-38

Beverly Mashinini is a Paralympian athlete from South Africa competing mainly in category F35/36 throws events.

Beverley competed in all three throws in the 2004 Summer Paralympics in Athens winning a bronze medal in the F35-38 javelin.
