= Tiina Ala-aho =

Finnish Paralympic athlete

Medal record

Track and field (athletics)

Representing Finland

Paralympic Games
Gold medal – first place	2000 Sydney	Shot Put - F33-34
Bronze medal – third place	2004 Athens	Javelin Throw - F33/34/52/53

Tiina Ala-aho is a paralympic athlete from Finland competing mainly in category F33 shot put and javelin events.

Tiina first competed in the 2000 Summer Paralympics where she won the gold medal in the F33-34 shot put. Four years later in the expanded F32-34/52/53 shot put she failed to medal but she did win a bronze in the F33/34/52/53 javelin. She then competed in the javelin again at the 2008 Summer Paralympics but failed to medal.
