= Kyoko Sato =

Japanese Paralympic athlete

Medal record

Paralympic athletics

Representing Japan

Paralympic Games
Silver medal – second place	2004 Athens	Discus Throw - F32-34/51-53

Kyoko Sato (佐藤京子, Satō Kyōko) is a Paralympian athlete from Japan competing mainly in throwing events.

Kyoko competed in the 2004 Summer Paralympics in Athens where she won a silver in the F32-34/51-53 discus as well as competing in the F32-34/452/53 shot put.
