= Wang Ting (athlete) =

Chinese Paralympic athlete

Medal record

Paralympic athletics

Representing China

Paralympic Games
Gold medal – first place	2004 Athens	Discus Throw - F54/55
Silver medal – second place	2008 Beijing	Discus Throw - F54-56

Wang Ting is a Paralympian athlete from China competing mainly in category F54-56 discus throw events.

She competed in the 2004 Summer Paralympics in Athens, Greece. There she won a gold medal in the women's F54/55 discus throw event. She failed, however, to win a medal in either of the shot put or javelin throw.

She competed in the 2008 Summer Paralympics in Beijing, China in an attempt to defend her title. However, she only won a silver medal in the women's F54-56 discus throw event.
