= Chen Liping (athlete) =

Chinese Paralympic athlete

Medal record

Track and field (athletics)

Representing China

Paralympic Games
| Bronze medal – third place | 2004 Athens | Discus Throw - F54/55 |
| Bronze medal – third place | 2004 Athens | Javelin Throw - F54/55 |

Chen Li Ping is a paralympic athlete from China competing mainly in category F54/55 throwing events.

Chen Li Ping competed in all three throwing events at the 2004 Summer Paralympics and although she was unable to medal in the shot she did win bronze medals in both the discus and javelin.
