= Jana Fesslová =

Czech Paralympic athlete (born 1976)

Personal information
- Born: 13 November 1976 (age 49) Ústí nad Labem
Medal record
Paralympic athletics
Representing Czech Republic
Paralympic Games
Bronze medal – third place	2008 Beijing	Discus Throw - F54-56

Jana Fesslová (born 13 November 1976 in Ústí nad Labem) is a Paralympian athlete from the Czech Republic, competing mainly in category F54-56 discus throw events.

== Biography ==
She competed in the 2008 Summer Paralympics in Beijing, China, winning a bronze medal in the F54-56 discus throw event.

She was investigated by the Czech Police for financial fraud.
