= Tunisia at the 2004 Summer Paralympics =

- IPC code: TUN
- NPC: Tunisian Paralympic Committee

in Athens
- Competitors: 22 in 1 sport
- Medals Ranked 22nd: Gold 8 Silver 7 Bronze 3 Total 18

Summer Paralympics appearances (overview)
- 1988; 1992; 1996; 2000; 2004; 2008; 2012; 2016; 2020; 2024

Tunisia participated in the 2004 Summer Paralympics in Athens. Tunisians athletes won a total of eight gold medals, seven silver and three bronze.

== Medallists ==
Medal	Name	Sport	Event
Gold	Maher Bouallegue	Athletics	Men's 1500m T13
Gold	Mohamed Charmi	Athletics	Men's 1500m T37
Gold	Maher Bouallegue	Athletics	Men's 5000m T12
Gold	Maher Bouallegue	Athletics	Men's 10000m T13
Gold	Mohamed Charmi; Farhat Chida; Fares Hamdi; Abbes Saidi	Athletics	Men's 4 × 400 m relay T35-38
Gold	Afrah Gomdi	Athletics	Women's shot put F40
Gold	Enna Ben Abidi	Athletics	Women's discus throw F40
Gold	Afrah Gomdi	Athletics	Women's javelin throw F40
Silver	Farhat Chida	Athletics	Men's 200m T38
Silver	Maher Bouallegue	Athletics	Men's 800m T12
Silver	Mohamed Charmi	Athletics	Men's 800m T37
Silver	Abbes Saidi	Athletics	Men's 800m T38
Silver	Haissem Ben Halima	Athletics	Men's discus throw F37
Silver	Afrah Gomdi	Athletics	Women's discus throw F40
Silver	Enna Ben Abidi	Athletics	Women's javelin throw F40
Bronze	Farhat Chida	Athletics	Men's 100m T38
Bronze	Enna Ben Abidi	Athletics	Women's shot put F40
Bronze	Fatma Kachroudi	Athletics	Women's discus throw F37

== Sports ==
=== Athletics ===
==== Men's track ====
Athlete	Class	Event	Heats		Semifinal		Final	
Athlete	Class	Event	Result	Rank	Result	Rank	Result	Rank
Ahmed Belhaj Ali	T12	100m	11.55	16	did not advance			
Mohamed Farhat Belkhir	T54	800m	1:37.88	14	did not advance			
Mohamed Farhat Belkhir	T54	5000m	10:30.26	15	did not advance			
Mohamed Farhat Belkhir	T54	10000m	21.12.64	12	did not advance			
Mohamed Farhat Belkhir	T54	Marathon	N/A				DNF	
Maher Bouallegue	T12	800m	1:57.81	2 Q	N/A		1:54.04	2nd place, silver medalist(s)
Maher Bouallegue	T12	5000m	N/A				14:54.08 PR	1st place, gold medalist(s)
Maher Bouallegue	T13	1500m	4:02.19	1 Q	N/A		3:51.09 WR	1st place, gold medalist(s)
Maher Bouallegue	T13	10000m	N/A				32.02.16 PR	1st place, gold medalist(s)
Mohamed Charmi	T37	800m	2:08.85 WR	1 Q	N/A		2:05.10	2nd place, silver medalist(s)
Mohamed Charmi	T37	1500m	N/A				4:22.09	1st place, gold medalist(s)
Farhat Chida	T38	100m	11.87	4 Q	N/A		11.64	3rd place, bronze medalist(s)
Farhat Chida	T38	200m	23.77	3 Q	N/A		23.37	2nd place, silver medalist(s)
Farhat Chida	T38	400m	52.74	2 Q	N/A		54.43	6
Fares Hamdi	T37	200m	DNF		did not advance			
Abbes Saidi	T38	800m	N/A				1:59.85	2nd place, silver medalist(s)
Mohamed Charmi; Farhat Chida; Fares Hamdi; Abbes Saidi	T35-38	4 × 400 m relay	N/A				3:38.92 WR	1st place, gold medalist(s)

==== Men's field ====
Athlete	Class	Event	Final		
Athlete	Class	Event	Result	Points	Rank
Tsung Wei Arfaoui	F46	Triple jump	11.66	-	10
Abdel Jabbar Dhifallah	F37	Javelin	43.37	-	4
Ali Ghribi	F58	Discus	44.48	-	8
Ali Ghribi	F58	Javelin	40.57	-	7
Ali Ghribi	P54-58	Pentathlon	5424		4
Haissem Ben Halima	F37	Discus	49.56	-	2nd place, silver medalist(s)
Fares Hamdi	F36-38	Long jump	5.48	947	7
Tahar Lachheb	F58	Discus	48.48	-	6
Tahar Lachheb	P54-58	Pentathlon	5009		7
Baraket Ltaief	P54-58	Pentathlon	4840		9
Faouzi Rzig	F35	Javelin	39.75	-	4

==== Women's track ====
Athlete	Class	Event	Heats		Semifinal		Final	
Athlete	Class	Event	Result	Rank	Result	Rank	Result	Rank
Samira Berri	T54	800m	1:54.53	8 q	N/A		1:54.14	8
Samira Berri	T54	1500m	3:38.87	9	did not advance			
Samira Berri	T54	5000m	13:48.04	12 Q	N/A		14:47.80	13
Samira Berri	T54	Marathon	N/A				DNF	
Souad Chamsi	T54	1500m	3:48.67	13	did not advance			
Souad Chamsi	T54	5000m	12:53.87	10 Q	N/A		12:33.40	8
Souad Chamsi	T54	Marathon	N/A				2:08:38	10
Messaouda Sifi	T54	100m	18.07	7 'q	N/A		18.21	8
Messaouda Sifi	T54	800m	2:00.34	15	did not advance			
Messaouda Sifi	T54	Marathon	N/A				2:06:00	7

==== Women's field ====
Athlete	Class	Event	Final		
Athlete	Class	Event	Result	Points	Rank
Enna Ben Abidi	F40	Discus	27.08 WR	-	1st place, gold medalist(s)
Enna Ben Abidi	F40	Javelin	24.68	-	2nd place, silver medalist(s)
Enna Ben Abidi	F40	Shot put	6.88	-	3rd place, bronze medalist(s)
Hania Aidi	F54/55	Discus	12.19	807	10
Hania Aidi	F54/55	Javelin	12.22	948	4
Hania Aidi	F54/55	Shot put	4.46	733	14
Thouraya Gharbi	F44/46	Long jump	4.32	1074	4
Afrah Gomdi	F40	Discus	25.73	-	2nd place, silver medalist(s)
Afrah Gomdi	F40	Javelin	32.05 WR	-	1st place, gold medalist(s)
Afrah Gomdi	F40	Shot put	7.47 WR	-	1st place, gold medalist(s)
Fatma Kachroudi	F37	Discus	26.15	702	3rd place, bronze medalist(s)

== Media ==
Tunisian broadcasting rights for the 2004 Games were acquired before the start of the Games.

== See also ==
- Tunisia at the Paralympics
- Tunisia at the 2004 Summer Olympics
