= Maha Alsheraian =

Kuwaiti Paralympic athlete

Medal record

Paralympic athletics

Representing Kuwait

Paralympic Games
Bronze medal – third place	2004 Athens	Shot Put - F32-34/52/53
Bronze medal – third place	2004 Athens	Discus Throw - F32-34/51-53

Mala Alsheraian is a paralympic athlete from Kuwait competing mainly in category F33 shot and discus events.

Maha competed in the 2000, 2004 and 2008 Summer Paralympics always in the shot put and discus. Her only medal success came in 2004 when she won a bronze medal in both the shot put and discus.
