= Zanele Situ =

South African Paralympic athlete (1971–2023)

- Zanele Situ as depicted in the book Zanele Situ: My Story by Liz Sparg, Jesse Breytenbach, and Andy Thesen

Personal information
- Full name: Ntombizanele Situ
- Born: 19 January 1971 Kokstad, South Africa
- Died: 1 November 2023 (aged 52)
- Years active: 1998–2021

Sport
- Disability: Spinal cord injury
- Disability class: F54
- Club: Maties ParaSport Club: Stellenbosch
- Coached by: Danny Damon
Medal record
Paralympic athletics
Representing South Africa
Paralympic Games
Gold medal – first place	2000 Sydney	Javelin throw – F52–54
Gold medal – first place	2004 Athens	Javelin throw – F54/55
Silver medal – second place	2000 Sydney	Discus throw – F51–54
Bronze medal – third place	2016 Rio de Janeiro	Javelin throw – F54
World Championships
Gold medal – first place	1998 Birmingham	Javelin F54
Gold medal – first place	2002 Lille	Javelin F54–56
Bronze medal – third place	1998 Birmingham	Discus F54
Bronze medal – third place	2011 Christchurch	Javelin F54–56
Bronze medal – third place	2013 Lyon	Javelin F54–56
Bronze medal – third place	2015 Doha	Javelin F54
Bronze medal – third place	2017 London	Javelin throw – F54

Ntombizanele Situ (19 January 1971 – 1 November 2023), better known as Zanele Situ, was a South African Paralympian athlete competing mainly in category F54 throwing events. Specialising in the javelin throw, Situ was a two-time gold medalist at both the Paralympics and the IPC Athletics World Championships and was the first female South African black athlete to win a Paralympic gold medal.

== Early life ==
Ntombizanele Situ was born in Kokstad, South Africa on 19 January 1971. At the age of twelve she experienced weakness in her legs which resulted in an inability to walk. Medical tests discovered a tuberculosis infection in her spine which resulted in Situ entering a two-year semi-coma, and was left with paralysis from the fourth vertebra down, leaving her requiring the use of a wheelchair. After becoming disabled she was schooled at Mthatha.

== Athletics career ==
Situ first came to the international stage in 1998 when she represented South Africa at her first IPC Athletics World Championships, held in Birmingham, England. There she entered both the javelin and discus events, winning gold in the javelin with a best throw of 14.45 metres, and bronze in the discus throw. This led her to the 2000 Summer Paralympics in Sydney where she won a gold in the F52–54 javelin and a silver in the F51–54 discus. By taking gold in Sydney she became the first South African female black athlete to win a Paralympic title. Two years later she successfully defended her javelin world title in Lille, but despite adding almost two meters to her discus distance from Birmingham, it was only good enough for a fourth-place finish. 2003 saw Situ recognized for her achievements by her country when she was awarded the Order of Ikhamanga (silver) for her contributions to sport.

Two years later in Athens, Situ successfully defended her javelin title at the 2004 Summer Paralympics. Although not finishing on the podium in either the shot put or the discus, she was recognized by the International Paralympic Committee as the female athlete who best embodied the spirit of the Games when she was awarded the Whang Youn Dai Achievement Award.

After Athens, Situ entered a barren period competitively, failing to reach the podium at the 2008 Summer Paralympics in Beijing. She recovered some form in 2011, when she won bronze at the Christchurch World Championships, but the emergence of world class competitors, such as Tunisia's Hania Aidi and China's Yang Liwan, made title challenges a difficult task. At the 2012 Summer Paralympics in London Situ threw a distance of 16.22 metres, but she fell short of the podium in fourth place.

In between the 2012 and 2016 Summer Paralympics, Situ claimed two more world bronze medals, at Lyon (2013) and Doha (2015), both in the javelin. At Rio, in the 2016 Paralympics, Situ achieved a personal best in the javelin, throwing a 17.90 metre mark in her third round to take her first Paralympic medal in twelve years, a bronze. At the Rio de Janeiro Games she was also recognized by her country, being given the honour of flag bearer during the opening ceremony.

== Death ==
Zanele Situ died in November 2023, at the age of 52.
