= Martina Kniezková =

Czech Paralympic athlete

Personal information
- Born: 21 August 1975 Havířov, Czechoslovakia
- Died: 24 February 2015 (aged 39)
Medal record
Paralympic athletics
Representing Czech Republic
Paralympic Games
Gold medal – first place	2000 Sydney	Discus Throw - F51-54
Gold medal – first place	2004 Athens	Discus Throw - F32-34/51-53
Silver medal – second place	2000 Sydney	Javelin Throw - F51/54

Martina Kniezková (21 August 1975 – 24 February 2015) was a Czech Paralympic athlete who competed mainly in category F52 discus events.

== Life and career ==
Kniezková was born 21 August 1975 in Havířov. She competed in three Paralympic Games, each time in the discus and javelin. Her first appearance in the 2000 Summer Paralympics was her most successful, winning the F51-54 discus and finishing second in the F52-54 javelin. Then in 2004 in Athens she defended her discus title in the F32-34/51-53 class but couldn't win a medal in the javelin. In Beijing in the 2008 Summer Paralympics she was unable to win a medal in either the discus or javelin. She died on 24 February 2015.
