= Tetyana Yakybchuk =

Ukrainian Paralympic athlete (born 1968)

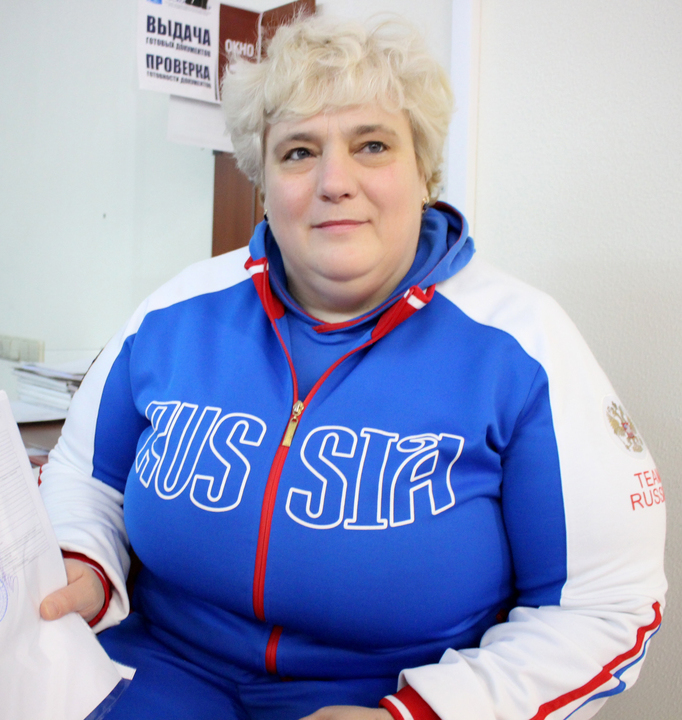
- Tetyana Yakybchuk

Medal record

Paralympic athletics

Representing Ukraine

Paralympic Games
Gold medal – first place	2008 Beijing	Discus Throw - F32-34/51/53
Silver medal – second place	2004 Athens	Shot Put - F32-34/52/53

Tetyana Yakybchuk, (Russian: Татьяна Михайловна Якибчук),(born 21 November 1968) is a Paralympian track and field athlete from Ukraine competing mainly in throwing events.

She competed in the 2004 Summer Paralympics in Athens, Greece. There she won a silver medal in the women's F32-34/52/53 shot put event; however, she failed to medal in either the discus or javelin.

She competed in the 2008 Summer Paralympics in Beijing, China. There she won a gold medal in the women's F32-34/51/53 discus throw event. However, she failed to win a medal in attempting to defend her shot put title.
