= María Salas (Paralympian) =

Mexican paraathlete (born 1969)

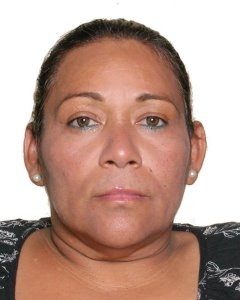

Personal information
- Full name: María Estela Salas Marín
- Born: 25 May 1969 (age 57) Chachalacas, Veracruz

Sport
- Country: Mexico
- Sport: Paralympic athletics
- Event: Women's shot
Medal record
Paralympic athletics
Representing Mexico
Paralympic Games
Gold medal – first place	2004 Athens	Shot put F32-34/52/53
Silver medal – second place	2004 Athens	Javelin throw F33/34/52/53
Parapan American Games
Gold medal – first place	2015 Toronto	Javelin throw F53/54

María Estela Salas Marín (born 25 May 1969 in Chachalacas, Veracruz) is a Paralympian athlete from Mexico competing mainly in the throwing events.

Maria competed in the 2004 Summer Paralympics in the throwing events. She won a combined F32-34/52/53 shot put gold medal and also won a silver in the F33/34/52/53 javelin as well as competing in the F32-34/51-53 discus.

For some unknown reason she did not compete at the shot put Rio 2016 competition.
