= Botswana at the Paralympics =

- IPC code: BOT
- NPC: Paralympic Association of Botswana
- Medals: Gold 1 Silver 0 Bronze 0 Total 1

Summer appearances
- 2004; 2008; 2012; 2016; 2020; 2024

Botswana first participated at the Paralympic Games in 2004, and has competed in every Summer Paralympic Games since then, apart from 2008 and 2012. The nation has never competed in the Winter Paralympic Games.

Botswana's debut came at the 2004 Summer Paralympics where they earned their first and only medal, a gold won by Paul Morama. Botswana have competed solely in athletics. The highest number of Motswana athletes participating in Summer Games is two, which occurred at the 2020 Summer Paralympics and 2024 Summer Paralympics which were hosted in Tokyo and Paris respectively.

== Disability classification ==
Every participant at the Paralympics has their disability grouped into one of five disability categories; amputation, which may be congenital or sustained through injury or illness; cerebral palsy; wheelchair athletes, which often overlap between this and other categories; visual impairment, including blindness; and Les autres, any physical disability that does not fall strictly under one of the other categories, for example dwarfism or multiple sclerosis. Each Paralympic sport then has its own classifications, dependent upon the specific physical demands of competition. Events are given a code, made of numbers and letters, describing the type of event and classification of the athletes competing. Some sports, such as athletics, divide athletes by both the category and severity of their disabilities, other sports, for example swimming, group competitors from different categories together, the only separation being based on the severity of the disability.

== Paralympic overview ==
=== 2004 Summer Paralympics ===
The first year Botswana participated in the Paralympics, they sent a single representative, Paul Morama, to compete in athletics. (Note: Morama identified as a woman while he participated in the 2004 and 2008 Paralympics, which is why he participated in the women's 400m T46 sprint. He transitioned in 2024 changing his name to Paul, and now uses he/him pronouns.) Morama entered only the women's 400m T46 sprint, and won gold, setting a world record time of 55.99.

=== 2008 Summer Paralympics ===
After his gold medal in Athens, Morama was due to represent Botswana again at the 2008 Summer Paralympics in Beijing, in the hopes of defending his title. He would have been the country's only representative. However, he withdrew prior to the Games due to injury and, shortly before the Games began, it was announced the country's other athletes, who might have replaced him, had been rejected.

=== 2012 Summer Paralympics ===
Botswana withdrew its sole athlete from the 2012 London Paralympics hours before the opening ceremony because the Botswana National Olympic Committee canceled financial support due to internal "financial irregularities".

=== 2016 Summer Paralympics ===
This was the country's second time competing at a Summer Paralympic Games. Botswana was represented by one athlete, Keatlaretese Mabote, competing in athletics. He competed in one event, the men's 400 metres T12 competition, where he was eliminated in the heat stages because he was third in his heat and only the top two participants in a heat progressed to the semi-finals.

=== 2020 Summer Paralympics ===
Botswana was represented by two athletes, Edwin Masuge and Gloria Majaga, both competing in athletics. They competed in the men and women's 400 metres T13 competition respectively, with Masuge advancing to the final and placing seventh, and Majaga being eliminated in her heat, placing fifth.

=== 2024 Summer Paralympics ===
Botswana was represented by two athletes, Edwin Masuge and Gloria Majaga, both competing in athletics. Masuge competed in the men's 400 metres T13 competition, reaching the final and placing seventh, while Majaga competed in the women's 400 metres T13 competition and women's 100 metres T13 competition, where she placed fifth in her heat in both.

== Medal tables ==
=== Medals by Summer Games ===
Games	Athletes	Gold	Silver	Bronze	Total	Rank
2004 Athens	1	1	0	0	1	54
2008 Beijing	Did not participate					
2012 London	Did not participate					
2016 Rio de Janeiro	1	0	0	0	0	-
2020 Tokyo	2	0	0	0	0	-
2024 Paris	2	0	0	0	0	-
2028 Los Angeles	Future event					
2032 Brisbane	Future event					
Total		1	0	0	1	

=== Medals by sport ===
Sport	Gold	Silver	Bronze	Total
Athletics	1	0	0	1
Totals (1 entries)	1	0	0	1

== List of medalists ==
Botswana's only medal is a gold awarded to Paul Morama in the women's 400 m T46 race at the 2004 Summer Paralympics in Athens, Greece.

Medal	Name	Games	Sport	Event
Gold (WR)	Paul Morama	2004 Athens	Athletics	Women's 400 m T46

== Flagbearers ==
Games	Athlete	Sport	Notes
2008 Beijing	Did not participate		
2012 London	Did not participate		
2016 Rio de Janeiro	Keatlaretse Mabote	Athletics	
2020 Tokyo	Gloria Majaga	Athletics	
2024 Paris	Edwin Masuge	Athletics	
2024 Paris	Gloria Majaga	Athletics	

== See also ==
- Botswana at the Olympics
