= Athletics at the 2004 Summer Paralympics – Women's 100 metres T46 =

Women's 100m T46 at the XII Paralympic Games
- Venue: Athens Olympic Stadium
- Dates: 21–22 September 2004
- Competitors: 16 from 11 nations
- Winning time: 12.50

Medalists
1st place, gold medalist(s)		Amy Winters	Australia
2nd place, silver medalist(s)		Anna Szymul	Poland
3rd place, bronze medalist(s)		Elena Chistilina	Russia

The Women's 100m races for class T46 amputee athletes at the 2004 Summer Paralympics were held in the Athens Olympic Stadium on 21 and 22 September. The event consisted of 2 heats and a final. It was won by Amy Winters, representing Australia.

== 1st round ==
Qualified for next round

Heat 1

21 Sept. 2004, 12:30

Rank	Athlete	Time	Notes
1	Anna Szymul (POL)	12.79	Q
2	Jessica Sachse (GER)	13.18	Q
3	April Holmes (USA)	13.51	WR Q
4	Wang Juan (CHN)	14.06	
5	Kate Horan (NZL)	14.40	
6	Sabine Wagner (GER)	14.59	
7	Mwanaidi Ng Itu (TAN)	15.72	
	Sharifa Ahmadi (AFG)	DNS	

Heat 2

21 Sept. 2004, 12:36

Rank	Athlete	Time	Notes
1	Amy Winters (AUS)	12.64	Q
2	Alicja Fiodorow (POL)	12.77	Q
3	Elena Chistilina (RUS)	12.87	Q
4	Iryna Leantsiuk (BLR)	13.18	q
5	Ou Yang Jing Ling (CHN)	13.31	q
6	Limpho Rakoto (LES)	14.52	
7	Katrin Laborenz (GER)	14.92	
8	Mareena Karim (AFG)	18.85	

== Final round ==
22 Sept. 2004, 17:00

Rank	Athlete	Time	Notes
1st place, gold medalist(s)	Amy Winters (AUS)	12.50	PR
2nd place, silver medalist(s)	Anna Szymul (POL)	12.64	
3rd place, bronze medalist(s)	Elena Chistilina (RUS)	12.76	
4	Alicja Fiodorow (POL)	12.89	
5	Iryna Leantsiuk (BLR)	13.04	
6	April Holmes (USA)	13.13	WR
7	Jessica Sachse (GER)	13.13	
8	Ou Yang Jing Ling (CHN)	13.30	
