= Athletics at the 2004 Summer Paralympics – Women's 400 metres T46 =

Special Olympics event

Women's 400m T46 at the XII Paralympic Games
- Venue: Athens Olympic Stadium
- Dates: 23–24 September 2004
- Competitors: 9 from 7 nations
- Winning time: 55.99

Medalists
1st place, gold medalist(s)		Tshotlego Morama	Botswana
2nd place, silver medalist(s)		Anna Szymul	Poland
3rd place, bronze medalist(s)		Alicja Fiodorow	Poland

Women's 400m races for class T46 amputee athletes at the 2004 Summer Paralympics were held in the Athens Olympic Stadium on 23 and 24 September. The event consisted of 2 heats and a final, and was won by Tshotlego Morama, representing Botswana.

== 1st round ==
Qualified for next round

Heat 1

23 Sept. 2004, 18:05

Rank	Athlete	Time	Notes
1	Tshotlego Morama (BOT)	57.09	WR Q
2	Alicja Fiodorow (POL)	1:01.23	Q
3	Elena Chistilina (RUS)	1:02.49	Q
4	Tetyana Rudkivska (UKR)	1:04.65	q
5	Botum Pov (CAM)	1:29.37	

Heat 2

23 Sept. 2004, 18:12

Rank	Athlete	Time	Notes
1	Anna Szymul (POL)	1:00.98	Q
2	Ning Sai Li (CHN)	1:02.60	Q
3	Alexandra Moguchaya (RUS)	1:04.14	Q
4	Kate Horan (NZL)	1:07.37	q

== Final round ==
24 Sept. 2004, 18:25

Rank	Athlete	Time	Notes
1st place, gold medalist(s)	Tshotlego Morama (BOT)	55.99	WR
2nd place, silver medalist(s)	Anna Szymul (POL)	57.45	
3rd place, bronze medalist(s)	Alicja Fiodorow (POL)	58.23	
4	Ning Sai Li (CHN)	58.76	
5	Alexandra Moguchaya (RUS)	1:02.74	
6	Tetyana Rudkivska (UKR)	1:04.12	
7	Kate Horan (NZL)	1:05.79	
8	Elena Chistilina (RUS)	1:56.61	
