= Athletics at the 2008 Summer Paralympics – Women's 100 metres T46 =

Women's 100m T46 at the XIII Paralympic Games
- Venue: Beijing National Stadium
- Dates: 10 September
- Competitors: 17 from 11 nations
- Winning time: 12.04

Medalists
1st place, gold medalist(s)		Yunidis Castillo	Cuba
2nd place, silver medalist(s)		Elena Chistilina	Russia
3rd place, bronze medalist(s)		Alicja Fiodorow	Poland

The women's 100m T46 event at the 2008 Summer Paralympics took place at the Beijing National Stadium on 10 September. There were two heats; the first 3 in each heat (Q) plus the 2 fastest other times (q) qualified.

== Results ==
=== Heats ===
Competed from 11:10.

==== Heat 1 ====
Rank	Name	Nationality	Time	Notes
1	Alicja Fiodorow	Poland	12.60	Q
2	Julie Smith	Australia	12.65	Q
3	Nikol Rodomakina	Russia	12.79	Q
4	Tetyana Rudkivs'ka	Ukraine	12.83	q
5	Iryna Leantsiuk	Belarus	12.91	q
6	Alexandra Moguchaya	Russia	13.04	
7	Marijke Mettes	Netherlands	13.30	
8	Sheila Finder	Brazil	13.32	
9	Kate Arnold	Great Britain	14.04	

==== Heat 2 ====
Rank	Name	Nationality	Time	Notes
1	Yunidis Castillo	Cuba	12.22	Q
2	Elena Chistilina	Russia	12.79	Q
3	Anna Mayer	Poland	12.88	Q
4	Katarzyna Piekart	Poland	13.20	
5	Fernanda Silva	Brazil	13.34	
6	Laura Aline Darimont	Germany	13.66	
7	Carlee Beattie	Australia	13.70	
	Tshotlego Morama	Botswana		DNS

=== Final ===
Competed at 18:00.

Rank	Name	Nationality	Time	Notes
1st place, gold medalist(s)	Yunidis Castillo	Cuba	12.04	WR
2nd place, silver medalist(s)	Elena Chistilina	Russia	12.65	
3rd place, bronze medalist(s)	Alicja Fiodorow	Poland	12.66	
4	Julie Smith	Australia	12.74	
5	Nikol Rodomakina	Russia	12.76	
6	Anna Mayer	Poland	12.78	
7	Tetyana Rudkivs'ka	Ukraine	12.85	
8	Iryna Leantsiuk	Belarus	13.00	

Q = qualified for final by place. q = qualified by time. WR = World Record. DNS = Did not start.
