= Botswana at the 2024 Summer Paralympics =

- Flag of Botswana
- IPC code: BOT
- NPC: Paralympic Association of Botswana

in Paris, France August 28, 2024 – September 8, 2024
- Competitors: 2 (1 man and 1 woman) in 1 sport
- Flag bearers: Gloria Majaga; Edwin Masuge
- Medals: Gold 0 Silver 0 Bronze 0 Total 0

Summer Paralympics appearances (overview)
- 2004; 2008; 2012; 2016; 2020; 2024

Botswana competed at the 2024 Summer Paralympics in Paris, France, from 28 August to 8 September.

== Background ==
Botswana made its fourth Paralympic Games appearance with their Paralympic debut occurring twenty years prior at the 2004 Summer Paralympics in Athens. The country did not compete at the 2008 Summer Paralympics because its sole athlete Tshotlego Morama had an injury and the nation withdrew several hours before the 2012 Summer Paralympics because the Botswana National Olympic Committee cancelled its financial support due to financial irregularities. At the 2016 Summer Paralympics Botswana sent sprinter Keatlaretse Mabote to compete, however he did not. advance from his heat. At the 2020 Summer Paralympics Botswana sent Edwin Masuge and Gloria Majaga who both competed in athletics. Masuge advanced placed seventh and Majaga was eliminated in her heat for placing fifth.

The 2024 Summer Paralympics were held from 28 August–8 September 2024 with a total of 4,434 athletes representing 169 National Paralympic Committees taking part. Botswana sent two athletes to the Rio Paralympic Games, sprinters Edwin Masuge and Gloria Majaga, who were selected to be the flag bearers during the parade of nations in the opening ceremony.

=== Disability classification ===
Every participant at the Paralympics has their disability grouped into one of five disability categories; amputation, the condition may be congenital or sustained through injury or illness; cerebral palsy; wheelchair athletes, there is often overlap between this and other categories; visual impairment, including blindness; Les autres, any physical disability that does not fall strictly under one of the other categories, for example dwarfism or multiple sclerosis. Each Paralympic sport then has its own classifications, dependent upon the specific physical demands of competition. Events are given a code, made of numbers and letters, describing the type of event and classification of the athletes competing. Some sports, such as athletics, divide athletes by both the category and severity of their disabilities, other sports, for example swimming, group competitors from different categories together, the only separation being based on the severity of the disability.

== Athletics ==
Key

- Note–Ranks given for track events are within the athlete's heat only
- Q = Qualified for the next round
- q = Qualified for the next round as a fastest loser or, in field events, by position without achieving the qualifying target
- DQ = Disqualified
- PR = Paralympic Record
- AR = Area (or continental) Record
- NR = National Record
- SB = Season's Best
- N/A = Round not applicable for the event
- Bye = Athlete not required to compete in round

Track & road events
Men

Athlete	Event	Heat		Final	
Athlete	Event	Result	Rank	Result	Rank
Edwin Masuge	400 m T13	—N/a		49.38	5

Women

Athlete	Event	Heat		Final	
Athlete	Event	Result	Rank	Result	Rank
Gloria Majaga	100 m T13	13.12	5	Did not advance	
Gloria Majaga	400 m T13	59.72	5	Did not advance	

== See also ==
- Botswana at the 2024 Summer Olympics
- Botswana at the Paralympics
