= Botswana at the 2016 Summer Paralympics =

- IPC code: BOT
- NPC: Paralympic Association of Botswana

in Rio de Janeiro
- Competitors: 1 in 1 sports
- Flag bearer: Keatlaretse Mabote
- Medals: Gold 0 Silver 0 Bronze 0 Total 0

Summer Paralympics appearances (overview)
- 2004; 2008; 2012; 2016; 2020; 2024

Botswana sent a delegation to compete at the 2016 Summer Paralympics in Rio de Janeiro, Brazil, from 7 to 18 September 2016. This was the country's second time competing at a Summer Paralympic Games after making its debut at the 2004 Summer Paralympics. Botswana was represented by one athlete, Keatlaretese Mabote, a short-distance sprinter. He competed in one event, the men's 400 metres T12 competition, where he was eliminated in the heat stages because he was third in his heat and only the top two participants in a heat progressed to the semi-finals.

== Background ==
Botswana made its second Paralympic Games appearance in Rio de Janeiro, with their Paralympic debut occurring twelve years prior at the 2004 Summer Paralympics in Athens. The country did not compete at the 2008 Summer Paralympics because its sole athlete Tshotlego Morama had an injury and the nation withdrew several hours before the 2012 Summer Paralympics because the Botswana National Olympic Committee cancelled its financial support due to financial irregularities. The 2016 Summer Paralympics were held from 7–18 September 2016 with a total of 4,328 athletes representing 159 National Paralympic Committees taking part. Botswana sent one athlete to the Rio Paralympic Games, sprinter Keatlaretse Mabote, who was selected to be the flag bearer during the parade of nations in the opening ceremony.

=== Disability classification ===
Every participant at the Paralympics has their disability grouped into one of five disability categories; amputation, the condition may be congenital or sustained through injury or illness; cerebral palsy; wheelchair athletes, there is often overlap between this and other categories; visual impairment, including blindness; Les autres, any physical disability that does not fall strictly under one of the other categories, for example dwarfism or multiple sclerosis. Each Paralympic sport then has its own classifications, dependent upon the specific physical demands of competition. Events are given a code, made of numbers and letters, describing the type of event and classification of the athletes competing. Some sports, such as athletics, divide athletes by both the category and severity of their disabilities, other sports, for example swimming, group competitors from different categories together, the only separation being based on the severity of the disability.

== Athletics ==
Competing for the first time in the Paralympics, Keatlarete Mabote was 26 years old at the time of the 2016 Summer Rio Paralympic Games. He has a visual impairment and is classified as a T12 athlete by the International Paralympic Committee. Mabote attained automatic qualification to the Games because of his performance at the Tunis International Para Athletics Meeting in March 2016 where he won two bronze medals and met the "B" qualifying standard in athletics. He trained for two weeks in the South African city of Potchefstroom as part of his preparation for the Games. Mabote's training was hindered when his tattered running shoes had no studs equipped and was provided the incorrect studs only a day which were suited to middle-distance runners before his event in Rio de Janeiro. This meant his old running shoes had the new studs fitted to them. In an interview before the Paralympics, Mabote said he was positive about his chances despite the recent death of one of his siblings, "I want to be the first Motswana to bring the medal to this country and I have worked so hard for this." On 8 September, he competed in the men's 400 metres T12. Drawn to heat one, Mabote finished third out of four sprinters, with a new personal best time of 51.33 seconds. As only the top two in a heat could progress to the semi-finals, Mabote was eliminated from the competition. (Note: Three athletes were disqualified in the heat stages.) He was due to run in the men's 200 metres T12 on 16 September but withdrew because of a hamstring injury he sustained in Germany.

Men's Track

| Athlete | Events | Heat | | Semifinal | | Final | |
| Athlete | Events | Time | Rank | Time | Rank | Time | Rank |
|---|---|---|---|---|---|---|---|
| Keatlaretse Mabote | 400 m T12 | 51.33 | 3 | did not advance | | | |

== See also ==
- Botswana at the 2016 Summer Olympics
