= Athletics at the 2004 Summer Paralympics – Women's 200 metres T46 =

Women's 200m T46 at the XII Paralympic Games
- Venue: Athens Olympic Stadium
- Dates: 25–27 September 2004
- Competitors: 13 from 10 nations
- Winning time: 25.54

Medalists
1st place, gold medalist(s)		Amy Winters	Australia
2nd place, silver medalist(s)		Anna Szymul	Poland
3rd place, bronze medalist(s)		Elena Chistilina	Russia

Women's 200m races for class T46 amputee athletes at the 2004 Summer Paralympics were held in the Athens Olympic Stadium on 25 and 27 September. The event consisted of 2 heats and a final, and was won by Amy Winters, representing Australia.

== 1st round ==
Qualified for next round

Heat 1

25 Sept. 2004, 21:25

Rank	Athlete	Time	Notes
1	Amy Winters (AUS)	25.77	Q
2	Elena Chistilina (RUS)	26.06	Q
3	Alicja Fiodorow (POL)	26.50	Q
4	Ning Sai Li (CHN)	26.93	q
5	Iryna Leantsiuk (BLR)	28.30	
6	Sabine Wagner (GER)	28.95	
7	Mwanaidi Ng Itu (TAN)	32.34	

Heat 2

25 Sept. 2004, 21:31

Rank	Athlete	Time	Notes
1	Anna Szymul (POL)	25.69	WR Q
2	Ou Yang Jing Ling (CHN)	26.92	Q
3	April Holmes (USA)	27.56	Q
4	Alexandra Moguchaya (RUS)	27.99	q
5	Tetyana Rudkivska (UKR)	28.37	
6	Olive Akobasenga (RWA)	31.81	

== Final round ==
27 Sept. 2004, 19:20

Rank	Athlete	Time	Notes
1st place, gold medalist(s)	Amy Winters (AUS)	25.54	WR
2nd place, silver medalist(s)	Anna Szymul (POL)	25.68	
3rd place, bronze medalist(s)	Elena Chistilina (RUS)	25.93	
4	Alicja Fiodorow (POL)	25.99	
5	Ou Yang Jing Ling (CHN)	26.78	
6	Ning Sai Li (CHN)	27.03	
7	April Holmes (USA)	27.74	
8	Alexandra Moguchaya (RUS)	28.41	
