= Athletics at the 2008 Summer Paralympics – Women's 200 metres T46 =

Women's 200m T46 at the XIII Paralympic Games
- Venue: Beijing National Stadium
- Dates: 12 September
- Competitors: 17 from 11 nations
- Winning time: 24.72

Medalists
1st place, gold medalist(s)		Yunidis Castillo	Cuba
2nd place, silver medalist(s)		Alicja Fiodorow	Poland
3rd place, bronze medalist(s)		Julie Smith	Australia

The women's 200m T46 event at the 2008 Summer Paralympics took place at the Beijing National Stadium on 12 September. There were two heats; the first three in each heat (Q) plus the two fastest other times (q) qualified.

== Results ==
=== Heats ===
Competed from 10:48.

==== Heat 1 ====
Rank	Name	Nationality	Time	Notes
1	Yunidis Castillo	Cuba	25.35	Q
2	Elena Chistilina	Russia	26.43	Q
3	Alicja Fiodorow	Poland	26.47	Q
4	Anna Mayer	Poland	26.63	q
5	Goodness Chinasa Duru	Nigeria	27.09	
6	Sheila Finder	Brazil	28.01	
7	Carlee Beattie	Australia	28.05	
8	Laura Aline Darimont	Germany	28.47	
9	Kate Arnold	Great Britain	28.83	

==== Heat 2 ====
Rank	Name	Nationality	Time	Notes
1	Julie Smith	Australia	26.37	Q
2	Nikol Rodomakina	Russia	26.40	Q
3	Tetyana Rudkivs'ka	Ukraine	26.43	Q
4	Iryna Leantsiuk	Belarus	26.93	q
5	Marijke Mettes	Netherlands	27.17	
6	Katarzyna Piekart	Poland	27.25	
7	Alexandra Moguchaya	Russia	27.32	
8	Fernanda Silva	Brazil	27.47	

=== Final ===
Competed at 18:10.

Rank	Name	Nationality	Time	Notes
1st place, gold medalist(s)	Yunidis Castillo	Cuba	24.72	WR
2nd place, silver medalist(s)	Alicja Fiodorow	Poland	25.96	
3rd place, bronze medalist(s)	Julie Smith	Australia	26.03	
4	Tetyana Rudkivs'ka	Ukraine	26.05	
5	Elena Chistilina	Russia	26.15	
6	Anna Mayer	Poland	26.48	
7	Nikol Rodomakina	Russia	26.52	
8	Iryna Leantsiuk	Belarus	27.11	

Q = qualified for final by place. q = qualified by time. WR = World Record.
