= Disability in Lesotho =

As of 2001, around 4.2% of the population of Lesotho has a degree of disability, in which one-third of them are children below 15 years of age.

== Classification ==
The majority of disabled people in the country have visual, hearing, mobility, memory, self-care, or communication impairments.

== Law and policy ==
Section 33 of the Constitution of Lesotho provides a provision for rehabilitation, training and social resettlement of persons with disability. Lesotho acceded to the Convention on the Rights of Persons with Disabilities of the United Nations on 2 December 2008. The National Disability and Rehabilitation Policy (NDRP) 201149 is aimed at guiding the government of Lesotho in designing disability-specific programs and interventions.

== Advocacy ==
The Lesotho National Federation of Organisations of the Disabled (LNFOD) was established in 1989 as the peak umbrella body of disability organisations. Its constituents are; Lesotho National Association of Physically Disabled (LNAPD), Intellectual Disability Association of Lesotho (IDAL), Lesotho National League of the Visually Impaired Persons (LNLVIP) and National Association of the Deaf in Lesotho (NADL).

== Employment ==
More than 65% of disabled people in the country depend on their immediate families and neighbors for their daily livelihoods.

== Sport ==
Lesotho made its Paralympic Games début at the 2000 Summer Paralympics in Sydney. It has competed in every edition of the Summer Paralympics since then, but never in the Winter Paralympics. Lesotho has not yet won a medal at the Paralympic Games.
