= Anna Szymul =

Polish Paralympic athlete

Medal record

Track and field (athletics)

Representing Poland

Paralympic Games
Silver medal – second place	2000 Sydney	100 metres - T46
Silver medal – second place	2000 Sydney	400 metres - T46
Silver medal – second place	2004 Athens	100 metres - T46
Silver medal – second place	2004 Athens	200 metres - T46
Silver medal – second place	2004 Athens	400 metres - T46
Bronze medal – third place	2000 Sydney	200 metres - T46

Anna Szymul is a paralympic athlete from Poland competing mainly in category T46 sprint events.

Anna has competed in three Paralympics, her first in 1996 Summer Paralympics she competed in the 100m and 200m but failed to win a medal. In 2000 Anna saw success winning silver in both the 100m and 400m and a bronze in the 200m. 2004 saw Anna go one better winning three silver medals in the 100m, 200m and 400m.
