= Lesotho at the 2016 Summer Paralympics =

- IPC code: LES
- NPC: National Paralympic Committee of Lesotho

in Rio de Janeiro
- Competitors: 2 in 1 sports
- Medals: Gold 0 Silver 0 Bronze 0 Total 0

Summer Paralympics appearances (overview)
- 2000; 2004; 2008; 2012; 2016; 2020; 2024

Lesotho sent a delegation to compete at the 2016 Summer Paralympics in Rio de Janeiro, Brazil, from 7 to 18 September 2016. This was the fifth time the country competed in the Summer Paralympic Games after it made its debut sixteen years prior at the 2000 Sydney Paralympics. The delegation to Rio de Janeiro consisted of two athletes: sprinter Sello Mothebe and discus thrower Litsitso Khotele. Mothebe originally came third in the heats of the men's 200 metres T12 and the men's 400 metres T12 events but he was retroactively disqualified for testing positive for a banned substance. Khotele ranked tenth in the women's discus throw F43–44 competition with a throw of 19.91 metres.

== Background ==
Lesotho made its Paralympic debut at the 2000 Summer Paralympics in Sydney, Australia. They have entered every Summer Paralympic Games since, making Rio de Janeiro the nation's fifth appearance in a Summer Paralympiad. Lesotho had not won a Paralympic medal before the Rio de Janeiro edition. The 2016 Summer Paralympics were held from 7–18 September 2016 with a total of 4,328 athletes representing 159 National Paralympic Committees taking part. Lesotho was represented by two athletes: sprinter Sello Mothebe and discus thrower Litsitso Khotele. They were accompanied by chef de mission Lefa Moneri, team manager Makatleho Liau, deputy sports minister Marefuoe Muso, disability sports desk officer Samuel Patsa, National Paralympic Committee of Lesotho secretary-general Jobo Raswoko and coaches Sellolane Tsoaeli and Thabiso Ratsoane. Khotele was chosen to be the flag bearer during the parade of nations for the opening ceremony.

== Disability classification ==
Every participant at the Paralympics has their disability grouped into one of five disability categories; amputation, the condition may be congenital or sustained through injury or illness; cerebral palsy; wheelchair athletes, there is often overlap between this and other categories; visual impairment, including blindness; Les autres, any physical disability that does not fall strictly under one of the other categories, for example dwarfism or multiple sclerosis. Each Paralympic sport then has its own classifications, dependent upon the specific physical demands of competition. Events are given a code, made of numbers and letters, describing the type of event and classification of the athletes competing. Some sports, such as athletics, divide athletes by both the category and severity of their disabilities, other sports, for example swimming, group competitors from different categories together, the only separation being based on the severity of the disability.

== Athletics ==
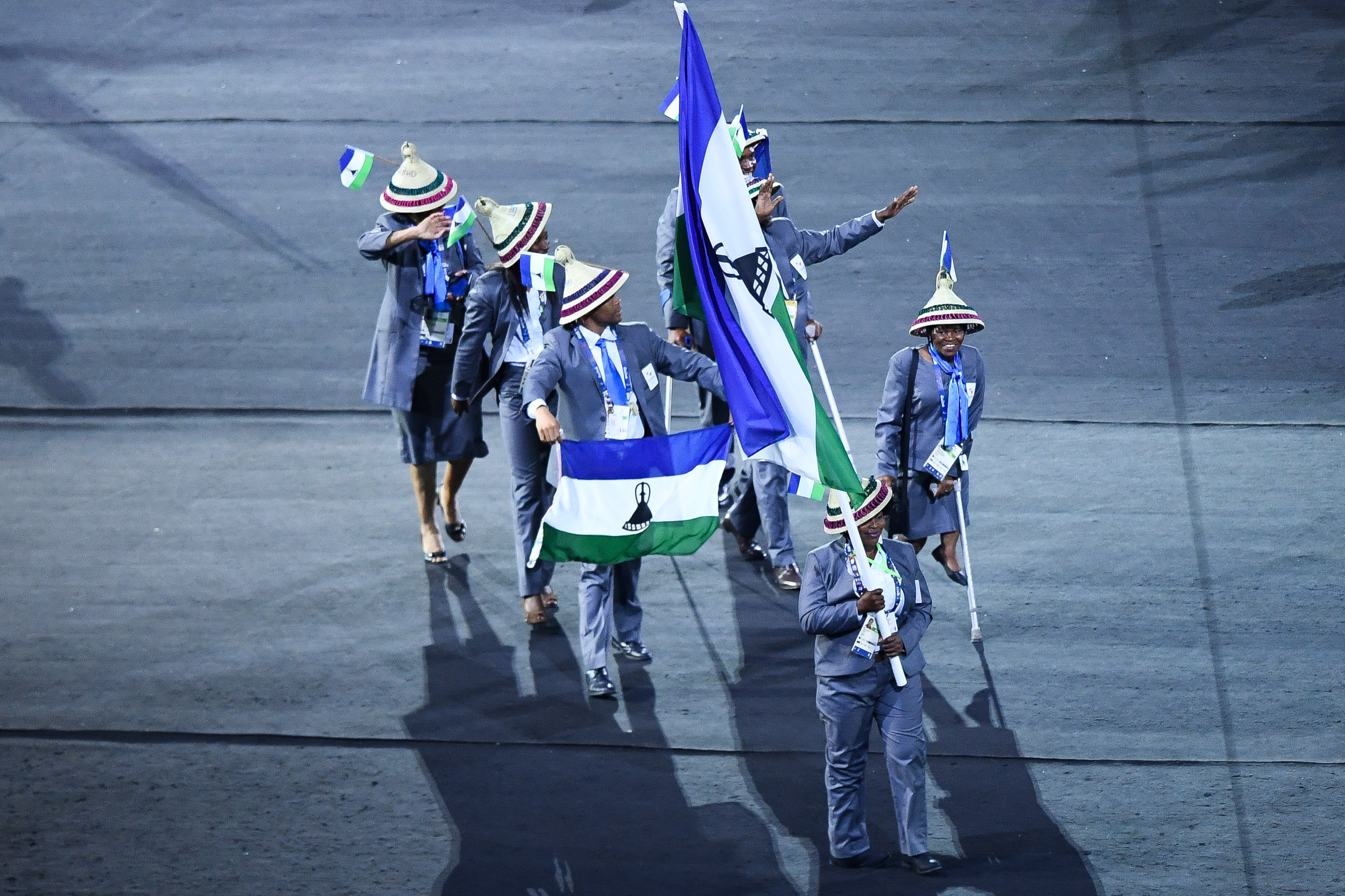
Lesotho's delegation during the parade of nations for the opening ceremony

Lesotho qualified two athletes in athletics. Public servant Sello Mothebe was 39 years old at the time of the Games and he was competing in his second Paralympics after representing Lesotho at the 2004 Summer Paralympics. He was born with a visual impairment and is classified as T12. On 8 September, Mothebe competed in the men's 400 metres T12 event and was assigned to heat two. He finished the race in a time of 54.65 seconds and this ranked him third out of four athletes. Mothebe did not advance to the semi-finals because he was slowest overall out of eleven finishers and only the top eight in all four heats advanced to that stage of the event. (Note: Three athletes were disqualified in the heat stages.) Eight days later, he participated in the men's 200 metres T12 competition. Drawn into heat four, Mothebe placed third and last of all the sprinters in his heat, with a season best time of 54.65 seconds, and that was the end of his completion because he was slowest overall out of fourteen finishers. (Note: Three athletes did not start the heats.) In January 2017, it was announced that he tested positive by the World Anti-Doping Agency for the banned substance 19-Norandrosterone prior to competing at the Games. A subsequent appeal with the Court of Arbitration for Sport was denied nine months later and Mothebe was banned from competition for four years and his results from Rio de Janeiro were annulled.

Litsitso Khotlele was 32 years old at the time of the Rio Summer Paralympics and these Games were her first significant international competition of her career. Her disability is congenital and she is classified as F44. Khotlele took up sport in 2004 and began playing discus throw eight years later. On 11 September, she participated in the women's discus throw F43–44 event. Khotlele recorded a best throw of 19.91 metres and this mark ranked her tenth out of twelve participants. The gold medal was won by Yao Juan of China, the silver medal was won by her fellow countrywoman Yang Yue, and the bronze medal was taken by Noraivis de la Heras Chibas of Cuba.

=== Men's Track ===
Athlete	Events	Heat		Semifinal		Final	
Athlete	Events	Time	Rank	Time	Rank	Time	Rank
Sello Mothebe	200 m T12	DSQ	3	did not advance			
Sello Mothebe	400 m T12	DSQ	3	did not advance			

=== Women's Field ===
Athlete	Events	Result	Rank
Litsitso Khotlele	Discus F43-44	19.91	10

== See also ==
- Lesotho at the 2016 Summer Olympics
