= Athletics at the 2016 Summer Paralympics – Men's 200 metres T12 =

Men's 200 metres T12 at the XV Paralympic Games
- Venue: Estádio Olímpico João Havelange
- Dates: 16–17 September 2016
- Competitors: 16 from 13 nations

Medalists
1st place, gold medalist(s)		Leinier Savon Pineda	Cuba
2nd place, silver medalist(s)		Hilton Langenhoven	South Africa
3rd place, bronze medalist(s)		Mahdi Afri	Morocco

The T12 category is for athletes with visual impairment. Athletes in this category will generally have some residual sight, the ability to recognise the shape of a hand at a distance of 2 metres and the ability to perceive clearly will be no more than 2/60. T12 athletes commonly run with guides.

The Athletics at the 2016 Summer Paralympics – Men's 200 metres T12 event at the 2016 Paralympic Games took place on 16–17 September 2016, at the Estádio Olímpico João Havelange.

== Heats ==
=== Heat 1 ===
18:39 16 September 2016:

Rank	Lane	Bib	Name	Nationality	Reaction	Time	Notes
1	7	1354	Leinier Savon Pineda	Cuba	0.172	22.42	Q
2	1	2395	Fakhriddin Khamraev	Uzbekistan	0.160	22.88	q
3	5	1148	Diogo Ualisson Jeronimo da Silva	Brazil	0.160	23.01	
	3	1084	Elmir Jabrayilov	Azerbaijan			DSQ

=== Heat 2 ===
18:46 16 September 2016:

Rank	Lane	Bib	Name	Nationality	Reaction	Time	Notes
1	7	1846	Mahdi Afri	Morocco	0.159	22.69	Q
2	5	2046	Luis Goncalves	Portugal	0.143	22.83	q
3	3	2087	Ndodomzi Jonathan Ntutu	South Africa	0.164	22.91	q
4	1	1258	Qichao Sun	China	0.162	23.06	

=== Heat 3 ===
18:53 16 September 2016:

Rank	Lane	Bib	Name	Nationality	Reaction	Time	Notes
1	3	2084	Hilton Langenhoven	South Africa	0.167	22.27	Q
2	5	2393	Mansur Abdirashidov	Uzbekistan	0.173	22.66	q
3	1	1877	Jesus Manuel Martinez Valles	Mexico	0.222	23.46	
	7	1553	Thomas Ulbricht	Germany			DSQ

=== Heat 4 ===
19:00 16 September 2016:

Rank	Lane	Bib	Name	Nationality	Reaction	Time	Notes
1	7	1422	Joan Munar Martinez	Spain	0.169	22.88	Q
2	5	1764	Henry Nzungi Mwendo	Kenya	0.157	23.16	
3	1	1820	Sello Mothebe	Lesotho	0.184	24.84	
	3	1875	Jorge Benjamin Gonzalez Sauceda	Mexico			DSQ

== Semifinals ==
=== Semifinal 1 ===
11:21 17 September 2016:

Rank	Lane	Bib	Name	Nationality	Reaction	Time	Notes
1	5	2084	Hilton Langenhoven	South Africa	0.198	22.50	Q
2	7	2393	Mansur Abdirashidov	Uzbekistan	0.147	22.69	q
3	3	1422	Joan Munar Martinez	Spain	0.179	22.96	
4	1	2046	Luis Goncalves	Portugal	0.147	22.98	

=== Semifinal 2 ===
11:21 17 September 2016:

Rank	Lane	Bib	Name	Nationality	Reaction	Time	Notes
1	5	1354	Leinier Savon Pineda	Cuba	0.179	22.28	Q
2	3	1846	Mahdi Afri	Morocco	0.161	22.58	q
3	1	2087	Ndodomzi Jonathan Ntutu	South Africa	0.172	22.87	
4	7	2395	Fakhriddin Khamraev	Uzbekistan	0.173	23.23	

== Final ==
19:03 17 September 2016:

Rank	Lane	Bib	Name	Nationality	Reaction	Time	Notes
1st place, gold medalist(s)	5	1354	Leinier Savon Pineda	Cuba	0.191	22.23	
2nd place, silver medalist(s)	3	2084	Hilton Langenhoven	South Africa	0.189	22.43	
3rd place, bronze medalist(s)	7	1846	Mahdi Afri	Morocco	0.148	22.57	
4	1	2393	Mansur Abdirashidov	Uzbekistan	0.148	22.69	
