= Lesotho at the 2008 Summer Paralympics =

- IPC code: LES
- NPC: National Paralympic Committee of Lesotho

in Beijing
- Competitors: 1 in 1 sport
- Flag bearers: Thato Mohasoa (opening & closing)
- Medals Ranked -th: Gold 0 Silver 0 Bronze 0 Total 0

Summer Paralympics appearances (overview)
- 2000; 2004; 2008; 2012; 2016; 2020; 2024

Lesotho sent a delegation to compete at the 2008 Summer Paralympics in Beijing, People's Republic of China. According to official records, the country's only athlete was female runner Thato Mohasoa.

== Athletics ==
Women

Athlete	Class	Event	Heats		Semifinal		Final		
Athlete	Class	Event	Result	Rank	Result	Rank	Result	Points	Rank
Thato Mohasoa	T12	100 m	15.95	4	did not advance				

== See also ==
- Lesotho at the Paralympics
- Lesotho at the 2008 Summer Olympics
