= Athletics at the 2020 Summer Paralympics – Men's 400 metres T13 =

Men's 400 metres T13 at the XVI Paralympic Games
- Venue: Tokyo National Stadium
- Dates: 1 September 2021 (heats); 2 September 2021 (final)
- Competitors: 15 from 12 nations
- Winning time: 46.70

Medalists
1st place, gold medalist(s)		Skander Djamil Athmani	Algeria
2nd place, silver medalist(s)		Mohamed Amguoun	Morocco
3rd place, bronze medalist(s)		Johannes Nambala	Namibia

The men's 400 metres T13 event at the 2020 Summer Paralympics in Tokyo, took place between 1 and 2 September 2021.

The T13 category is for athletes with a moderate visual impairment. Athletes in this category have a variety of visual impairments, but can typically recognize contours from a distance of 2 to 6 metres. Athletes in this category do not typically require a guide.

== Records ==
Prior to the competition, the existing records were as follows:

World Record	Mohamed Amguoun (MAR)	46.92	London, United Kingdom	21 July 2017
Paralympic Record	Mohamed Amguoun (MAR)	47.15	Rio de Janeiro, Brazil	15 September 2016

Area	Time	Athlete	Nation
Africa	46.92 WR	Mohamed Amguoun	Morocco
America	49.27	Valerys Larrondo Gutierrez	Cuba
Asia	49.89	Fakhriddin Khamraev	Uzbekistan
Europe	48.37	Egor Sharov	Russia
Oceania	51.38	Tim Prendergast	New Zealand

== Results ==
=== Heats ===
Heat 1 took place on 1 September 2021, at 20:19:

Rank	Lane	Name	Nationality	Time	Notes
1	2	Skander Djamil Athmani	Algeria	47.86	Q, PB
2	6	Egor Sharov	RPC	49.91	Q, SB
3	3	Buinder Bermúdez	Colombia	49.91	Q, PB
4	4	Hakan Cira	Turkey	50.23	q
5	8	Vahid Alinajimi	Iran	50.25	PB
6	5	Joel Gomez	United States	52.06	PB
	7	Mouncef Bouja	Morocco	DNF	

Heat 2 took place on 1 September 2021, at 20:27:

Rank	Lane	Name	Nationality	Time	Notes
1	2	Mohamed Amguoun	Morocco	48.52	Q, SB
2	7	Johannes Nambala	Namibia	49.37	Q, SB
3	6	Aleksandr Shirin	RPC	49.83	Q, SB
4	5	Edwin Masuge	Botswana	50.13	q, PB
5	4	Jorge Benjamín González Sauceda	Mexico	50.53	SB
6	3	Elmir Jabrayilov	Azerbaijan	52.17	
7	8	Hilario Chavela	Mozambique	53.02	PB
	9	Abdellatif Baka	Algeria	DNS	

=== Final ===
The final took place on 2 September 2021, at 9:54:

Rank	Lane	Name	Nationality	Time	Notes
1st place, gold medalist(s)	6	Skander Djamil Athmani	Algeria	46.70	WR
2nd place, silver medalist(s)	7	Mohamed Amguoun	Morocco	47.70	SB
3rd place, bronze medalist(s)	4	Johannes Nambala	Namibia	48.76	SB
4	8	Buinder Bermúdez	Colombia	49.26	AR
5	9	Aleksandr Shirin	RPC	49.75	SB
6	3	Hakan Cira	Turkey	50.05	
7	2	Edwin Masuge	Botswana	50.54	
8	5	Egor Sharov	RPC	50.96	
