= Athletics at the 2023 Parapan American Games – Men's 400 metres T13 =

Men's 400 metres T13 at the 2023 Parapan American Games
- Venue: Mario Recordón Athletics Training Center
- Dates: November 24
- Competitors: 7 from 7 nations
- Winning time: 49.50

Medalists
1st place, gold medalist(s)		Buinder Bermúdez	Colombia
2nd place, silver medalist(s)		Davi Wilker de Souza	Brazil
3rd place, bronze medalist(s)		Yosmer Rojas	Venezuela

The men's T13 400 metres competition of the athletics events at the 2023 Parapan American Games was held on November 24 at the Mario Recordón Athletics Training Center within the Julio Martínez National Stadium of Santiago, Chile.

== Records ==
Prior to this competition, the existing world and Pan American Games records were as follows:

World record	Skander Athmani (ALG)	46.70	Tokyo, Japan	September 2, 2021
Parapan American Games record	Royal Mitchell (USA)	50.39	Rio de Janeiro, Brazil	August 16, 2007
Americas record	Buinder Bermúdez (COL)	49.21	Paris, France	July 15, 2023

== Schedule ==
Date	Time	Round
November 24, 2023	15:37	Final

== Results ==
All times shown are in seconds.

KEY:	q	Fastest non-qualifiers	Q	Qualified	PR	Parapan Games record	NR	National record	SB	Seasonal best	DQ	Disqualified

=== Final ===
The results were as follows:

Rank	Lane	Name	Nationality	Time	Notes
1st place, gold medalist(s)	3	Buinder Bermúdez	Colombia	49.50	PR
2nd place, silver medalist(s)	5	Davi Wilker de Souza	Brazil	49.60	SB
3rd place, bronze medalist(s)	2	Yosmer Rojas	Venezuela	50.85	
4	6	Mario Chessani	Mexico	52.32	
5	7	Caleb Howard	United States	54.93	
6	4	Franco Pinetti	Argentina	55.37	
7	8	Derri Batiz	Honduras	1:03.59	
