= Lesotho at the Paralympics =

- IPC code: LES
- NPC: National Paralympic Committee of Lesotho
- Medals: Gold 0 Silver 0 Bronze 0 Total 0

Summer appearances
- 2000; 2004; 2008; 2012; 2016; 2020; 2024

Lesotho made its Paralympic Games début at the 2000 Summer Paralympics in Sydney. It has competed in every edition of the Summer Paralympics since then, but never in the Winter Paralympics. Lesotho has never won a medal at the Paralympic Games.

A total of four athletes have represented Lesotho at the Paralympics, all in athletics. Levy Moshoeshoe Makoanyane took part in the men's 100m and 200m (T46) at the 2000 Games, failing to advance from the heats in either event. Limpho Rakoto competed in the women's 100m (T46) in both the 2000 and the 2004 Games, and also failed to advance from the heats. Sello Mothebe ran in the men's 100m (T12) in 2004, with the same outcome. And Thato Mohasoa was her country's sole representative at the 2008 Games, running in the women's 100m (T12) without advancing from the heats.

Lesotho will be taking part in the 2012 Summer Paralympics, and the National Paralympic Committee of Lesotho have chosen Bedford as the UK base for its Paralympians.

== See also ==
- Lesotho at the Olympics
