= Botswana at the 2004 Summer Paralympics =

- IPC code: BOT
- NPC: Paralympic Association of Botswana

in Athens
- Competitors: 1 in 1 sport
- Medals Ranked 57th: Gold 1 Silver 0 Bronze 0 Total 1

Summer Paralympics appearances (overview)
- 2004; 2008; 2012; 2016; 2020; 2024

Botswana made its Paralympic Games début at the 2004 Summer Paralympics in Athens. The country sent a single representative (Tshotlego Morama) to compete in athletics. She set a world record and won a gold medal in the T46 women's 400m.

== Team ==
Botswana made their Paralympic debut in Athens. The country sent a single representative, Tshotlego Morama, to compete in athletics.

== Athletics ==
Morama entered only the 400m sprint event, in the T46 category. She finished first of her heat, and, with a time of 57.09, was the only athlete to run under one minute in the heats. She ran the final in 55.99 seconds, setting a new world record to take gold.

Women

Athlete	Class	Event	Heats		Final	
Athlete	Class	Event	Result	Rank	Result	Rank
Tshotlego Morama	T46	400 m	57.09	1 Q	55.99	(WR)

== See also ==
- Botswana at the Paralympics
- Botswana at the 2004 Summer Olympics
