= Lesotho at the 2012 Summer Paralympics =

- IPC code: LES
- NPC: National Paralympic Committee of Lesotho

in London
- Competitors: 1 in 1 sport
- Medals: Gold 0 Silver 0 Bronze 0 Total 0

Summer Paralympics appearances (overview)
- 2000; 2004; 2008; 2012; 2016; 2020; 2024

Lesotho competed at the 2012 Summer Paralympics in London, United Kingdom from August 29 to September 9, 2012.

== Athletics ==
Women’s track

Athlete	Event	Heat		Final	
Athlete	Event	Result	Rank	Result	Rank
Mary Letsoara	100m T13	16.78	6	Did not advance	

== See also ==
- Lesotho at the Paralympics
- Lesotho at the 2012 Summer Olympics
