= Lesotho at the 2024 Summer Paralympics =

- IPC code: LES
- NPC: National Paralympic Committee of Lesotho

in Paris, France August 28, 2024 – September 8, 2024
- Competitors: 2 (1 man and 1 woman) in 1 sport
- Flag bearers: Zimesele Khamoqane; Litsitso Khotlele
- Medals: Gold 0 Silver 0 Bronze 0 Total 0

Summer Paralympics appearances (overview)
- 2000; 2004; 2008; 2012; 2016; 2020; 2024

Lesotho competed at the 2024 Summer Paralympics in Paris, France, from 28 August to 8 September 2024. This was the nation's seventh time competing at the Summer Paralympic Games after it made its debut at the 2000 Summer Paralympics. The delegation consisted of two competitors from one sport.

== Competitors ==
The following is the list of number of competitors in the Games.

Sport	Men	Women	Total
Athletics	1	1	2
Total	1	1	2

== Athletics ==
Athlete	Event	Heat		Final	
Athlete	Event	Result	Rank	Result	Rank
Litsitso Khotlele	Women's shot put F64	—		7.75	13
Litsitso Khotlele	Women's discus throw F64	—		23.31	11
Zimesele Khamoqane	Men's 400 metres T11	DQ		Did not advance	

== See also ==
- Lesotho at the 2024 Summer Olympics
- Lesotho at the Paralympics
