= Athletics at the 2024 Summer Paralympics – Men's 400 metres T13 =

Men's 400 metres T13 at the XVII Paralympic Games
- Venue: Stade de France, Paris, France
- Dates: 5 September 2024
- Competitors: 9 from 8 nations
- Winning time: 47.43

Medalists
1st place, gold medalist(s)		Skander Djamil Athmani	Algeria
2nd place, silver medalist(s)		Ryota Fukunaga	Japan
3rd place, bronze medalist(s)		Buinder Bermúdez	Colombia

400 metres at the 2024 Summer Paralympics
Men · T11 · T12 · T13 · T20 · T36 · T37 · T38 · T47 · T52 · T53 · T54 · T62
Women · T11 · T12 · T13 · T20 · T37 · T38 · T47 · T53 · T54 ·

The Men's 400 metres T13 at the 2024 Summer Paralympics took place on 5 September 2024 at the Stade de France in Paris.

== Records ==
World Record	Skander Djamil Athmani (ALG)	46.44	(Japan) Kobe	23 May 2024
Paralympic Record	Skander Djamil Athmani (ALG)	46.70	(Japan) Tokyo	2 September 2021

Area	Time	Athlete	Location	Date
Africa				
America				
Asia				
Europe				
Oceania				

== Classification ==
The T12 classification is for visually impaired athletes with a LogMAR between 1 and 1.4, and/or a maximum visual acuity range of 40 degrees.

== Results ==
=== Final ===
The final was held on 5 September 2024, starting at 10:21 (UTC+2) in the morning session.

Rank	Lane	Athlete	Nation	Time	Notes
1st place, gold medalist(s)	5	Skander Djamil Athmani	Algeria	47.43	
2nd place, silver medalist(s)	6	Fukunoga Ryota	Japan	48.07	
3rd place, bronze medalist(s)	8	Buinder Bermúdez	Colombia	48.83	AR
4	7	Johannes Nambala	Namibia	48.89	SB
5	4	Edwin Masuge	Botswana	49.38	PB
6	9	Max Marzillier	Germany	50.49	
7	3	Abdellatif Baka	Algeria	52.25	
8	2	Moses Misoya	Malawi	54.27	PB
–	1	Jakkarin Dammunee	Thailand	DNS	
