= New South Wales Hall of Champions =

Hall of Champions collection
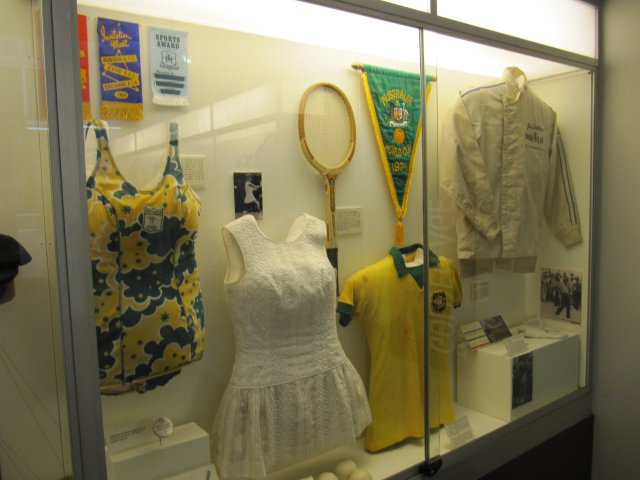
- Part of the collection

- Location within Sydney
- 33.8534°S 151.0694°E
- Location: Australia Avenue, Sydney Olympic Park, New South Wales, Australia

Site notes
- Owner: State Sports Centre Trust

New South Wales Heritage Register
- Official name: Hall of Champions (collection)
- Type: state heritage (movable / collection)
- Designated: 2 April 1999
- Reference no.: 1295
- Type: Olympic Objects
- Category: Collections

The New South Wales Hall of Champions is a museum at Australia Avenue, Sydney Olympic Park, New South Wales, Australia. The property is owned by State Sports Centre Trust (State Government). The museum's collection was added to the New South Wales State Heritage Register on 2 April 1999.

== History ==
The collection was started in 1978 by the then Minister for Sport, the late Ken Booth. The Hall of Champions was established to pay tribute to sportsmen and women from New South wales who had excelled at national and international level. Each year a number of athletes are selected by a committee and inducted into the Hall. A permanent photographic display and sporting biography is displayed of the athlete. Inductees donate material relating to their sporting career. These items are then incorporated into exhibitions which are changed on a regular basis. The collection is based on those athletes who have been inducted into the Hall of Champions. As of 1997 there are 269 athletes on the Roll of Honour. The Hall of Champions was originally housed in Sports House in the historic The Rocks area, but was moved to the State Sports Centre, Homebush in 1984 when it opened.

== Description ==
The collection consists of clothing, sports equipment, medals, pennants, certificates, trophies, badges and photographs, as well as ephemera (tickets, programmes, souvenirs, magazines, autographs and scrapbooks).

== Heritage listing ==
The significance in the collection lies in the fact that it is the largest and most diverse collection of sporting memorabilia held by a museum in the state of New South Wales. It covers approximately 36 different sports, spans the period from the 1880s to the present, relates to many significant Australian athletes and important sporting events such as the Olympic Games and the Commonwealth Games.

The Hall of Champions collection was listed on the New South Wales State Heritage Register on 2 April 1999 having satisfied the following criteria.

The place is important in demonstrating the course, or pattern, of cultural or natural history in New South Wales.

The collection contains a number of rare items of significance to Australia's cultural/sporting heritage. Examples are the gold, silver and bronze medals won by Andrew "Boy" Charlton at the 1924 Olympics (swimming); an honour cap from the first rugby league team of 1907; the gold Olympic certificate won by Fanny Durack (swimmer) at the 1912 Olympics (Fanny was the first woman to represent Australia at the Olympics)

The place has potential to yield information that will contribute to an understanding of the cultural or natural history of New South Wales.

Some scrapbooks have been compiled along sporting themes, and these would provide a rich source for research.

The place possesses uncommon, rare or endangered aspects of the cultural or natural history of New South Wales.

Some items listed above are rare as they relate to a known athlete; includes an almost complete collection of every award won by Shane Gould (excepting Gold medals, but including Olympic certificates).
