= Julie Smith (athlete) =

Australian Paralympic athlete

Medal record

Track and field (T46)

Representing Australia

Paralympic Games
| Bronze medal – third place | 2008 Beijing | 200m - T46 |

Julie Smith (born 19 November 1982) is a Paralympian athlete from Australia competing mainly in category T46 sprint events.

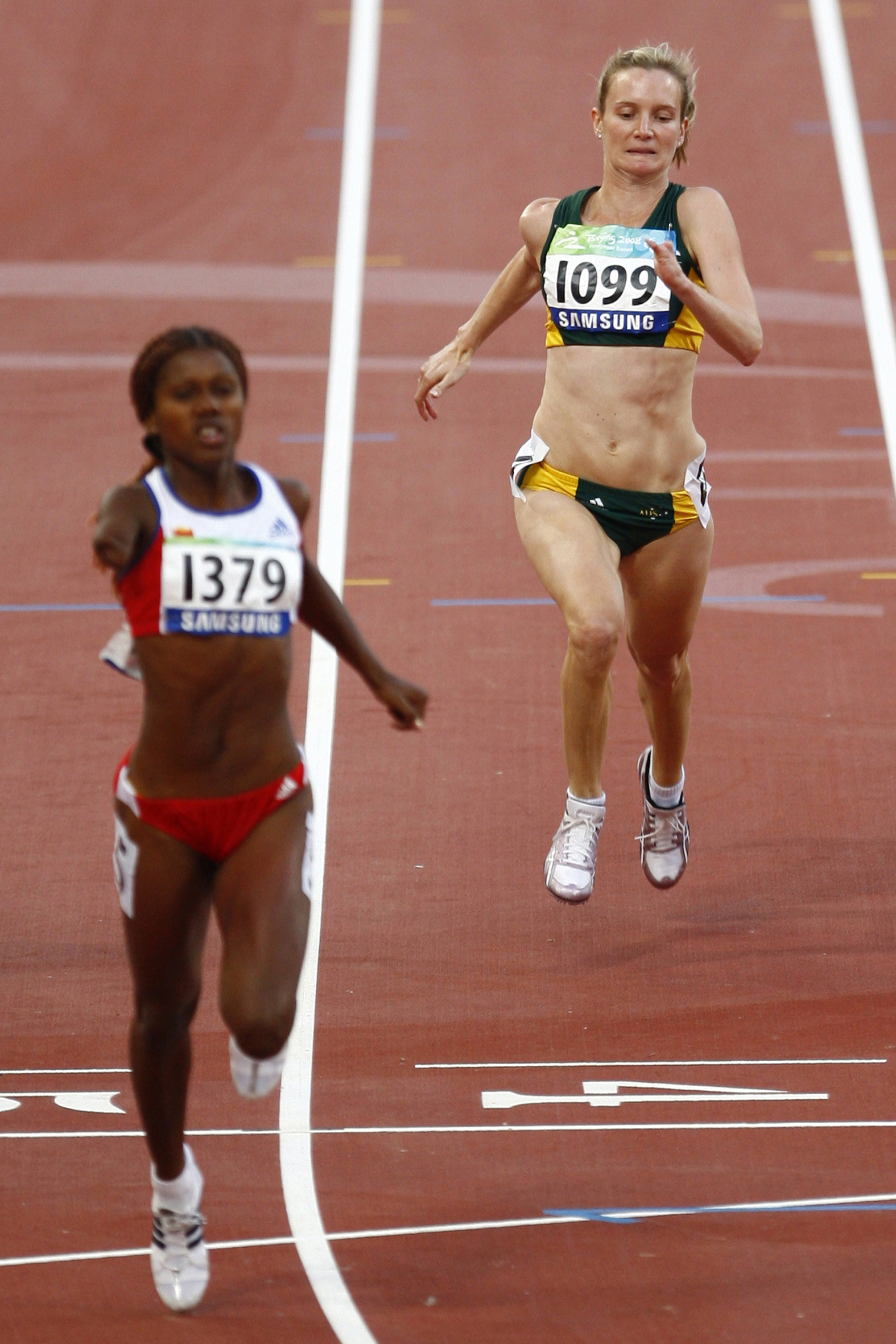
Julie Smith (right) in the 100m T46 final at the 2008 Beijing Games

She competed in the 2008 Summer Paralympics in Beijing, China. There she won a bronze medal in the women's 200 metres - T46 event and finished fourth in the women's 100 metres - T46 event.
