= Sun Qichao =

Chinese Paralympic sprinter

Personal information
- Nationality: Chinese
- Born: 13 December 1994 (age 31)

Sport
- Sport: Track and field
- Disability class: T12
- Event: sprint
Medal record
Men's Paralympic athletics
Representing China
Paralympic Games
Gold medal – first place	2016 Rio de Janeiro	400 m T12
Silver medal – second place	2016 Rio de Janeiro	4 x 100 m relay T11-13
World Championships
Gold medal – first place	2017 London	4x100m relay T11-13
Silver medal – second place	2015 Doha	400 metres T12
Asian Para Games
Gold medal – first place	2014 Incheon	200m T12

Sun Qichao (born 13 December 1994) is a Chinese Paralympic sprinter mainly competing in T12 events. He won the silver medal at the Men's 400 metres T12 event at the 2015 IPC Athletics World Championships. He won the gold medal at the Men's 400 metres T12 event at the 2016 Summer Paralympics.
