= Buinder Bermúdez =

Colombian paralympic athlete

Personal information
- Full name: Buinder Brainer Bermúdez Villar
- Born: 29 June 1996 (age 30) Valledupar, Cesar Colombia

Sport
- Country: Colombia
- Sport: Para-athletics
- Disability class: T12; T13
- Events: 100 metres; 400 metres
Medal record
Men's para-athletics
Representing Colombia
Event	1st	2nd	3rd
Paralympic Games	0	0	1
World Championships	0	0	2
Parapan American Games	2	0	0
Total	2	0	3
Paralympic Games
Bronze medal – third place	2024 Paris	400 m T13
World Championships
Bronze medal – third place	2023 Paris	400 m T13
Bronze medal – third place	2024 Kobe	400 m T13
Parapan American Games
Gold medal – first place	2019 Lima	400 m T12
Gold medal – first place	2023 Santiago	400 m T13

Buinder Bermúdez (born 29 June 1996) is a Colombian paralympic athlete. He competed at the 2024 Summer Paralympics, winning the bronze medal in the men's 400 m T13 event.
