= Athletics at the 2016 Summer Paralympics – Men's 400 metres T12 =

Men's 400 metres T12 at the XV Paralympic Games
- Venue: Estádio Olímpico João Havelange
- Dates: 8–9 September 2016
- Competitors: 15 from 14 nations

Medalists
| 1st place, gold medalist(s) | | Qichao Sun | China |
| 2nd place, silver medalist(s) | | Mahdi Afri | Morocco |
| 3rd place, bronze medalist(s) | | Luis Goncalves | Portugal |

The T12 category is for athletes with visual impairment. Athletes in this category will generally have some residual sight, the ability to recognise the shape of a hand at a distance of 2 metres and the ability to perceive clearly will be no more than 2/60. T12 athletes commonly run with guides.

The Athletics at the 2016 Summer Paralympics – Men's 400 metres T12 event at the 2016 Paralympic Games took place on 8–9 September 2016, at the Estádio Olímpico João Havelange.

== Heats ==
=== Heat 1 ===
11:56 8 September 2016:

| Rank | Lane | Bib | Name | Nationality | Reaction | Time | Notes |
|---|---|---|---|---|---|---|---|
| 1 | 7 | 2084 | Hilton Langenhoven | South Africa | 0.192 | 50.26 | Q |
| 2 | 5 | 1553 | Thomas Ulbricht | Germany | 0.178 | 50.77 | q |
| 3 | 3 | 1129 | Keatlaretse Mabote | Botswana | 0.219 | 51.33 | |
| 4 | 1 | 1441 | Megersa Tassisa Bati | Ethiopia | 0.230 | 51.39 | |

=== Heat 2 ===
12:04 8 September 2016:

| Rank | Lane | Bib | Name | Nationality | Reaction | Time | Notes |
|---|---|---|---|---|---|---|---|
| 1 | 5 | 1846 | Mahdi Afri | Morocco | 0.162 | 49.32 | Q |
| 2 | 1 | 2046 | Luis Goncalves | Portugal | 0.142 | 49.60 | q |
| 3 | 3 | 1820 | Sello Mothebe | Lesotho | 0.194 | 54.65 | |
| | 7 | 1908 | Martin Amutenya Aloisius | Namibia | 0.158 | | DSQ |

=== Heat 3 ===
12:11 8 September 2016:

| Rank | Lane | Bib | Name | Nationality | Reaction | Time | Notes |
|---|---|---|---|---|---|---|---|
| 1 | 7 | 1422 | Joan Munar Martinez | Spain | 0.165 | 49.56 | Q |
| 2 | 5 | 1258 | Qichao Sun | China | 0.162 | 49.58 | q |
| 3 | 3 | 1084 | Elmir Jabrayilov | Azerbaijan | 0.166 | 49.74 | q |
| 4 | 1 | 1877 | Jesus Manuel Martinez Valles | Mexico | 0.221 | 51.10 | |

=== Heat 4 ===
12:18 8 September 2016:

| Rank | Lane | Bib | Name | Nationality | Reaction | Time | Notes |
|---|---|---|---|---|---|---|---|
| 1 | 5 | 1875 | Jorge Benjamin Gonzalez Sauceda | Mexico | 0.177 | 52.62 | Q |
| | 7 | 2395 | Fakhriddin Khamraev | Uzbekistan | 0.283 | | DSQ |
| | 3 | 1764 | Henry Nzungi Mwendo | Kenya | 0.153 | | DSQ |

== Semifinals ==
=== Semifinal 1 ===
18:38 8 September 2016:

| Rank | Lane | Bib | Name | Nationality | Reaction | Time | Notes |
|---|---|---|---|---|---|---|---|
| 1 | 7 | 2046 | Luis Goncalves | Portugal | 0.147 | 49.92 | Q |
| 2 | 3 | 1422 | Joan Munar Martinez | Spain | 0.175 | 50.12 | q |
| 3 | 1 | 1084 | Elmir Jabrayilov | Azerbaijan | 0.158 | 50.17 | |
| | 5 | 2084 | Hilton Langenhoven | South Africa | 0.209 | | DSQ |

=== Semifinal 2 ===
18:46 8 September 2016:

| Rank | Lane | Bib | Name | Nationality | Reaction | Time | Notes |
|---|---|---|---|---|---|---|---|
| 1 | 7 | 1258 | Qichao Sun | China | 0.172 | 49.28 | Q |
| 2 | 5 | 1846 | Mahdi Afri | Morocco | 0.164 | 49.34 | q |
| 3 | 1 | 1553 | Thomas Ulbricht | Germany | 0.170 | 51.40 | |
| | 3 | 1875 | Jorge Benjamin Gonzalez Sauceda | Mexico | | | DSQ |

== Final ==
19:31 9 September 2016:

| Rank | Lane | Bib | Name | Nationality | Reaction | Time | Notes |
|---|---|---|---|---|---|---|---|
| 1st place, gold medalist(s) | 3 | 1258 | Qichao Sun | China | 0.150 | 48.57 | |
| 2nd place, silver medalist(s) | 7 | 1846 | Mahdi Afri | Morocco | 0.138 | 49.00 | |
| 3rd place, bronze medalist(s) | 5 | 2046 | Luis Goncalves | Portugal | 0.145 | 49.54 | |
| 4 | 1 | 1422 | Joan Munar Martinez | Spain | 0.173 | 50.08 | |
