= Lesotho at the 2004 Summer Paralympics =

- IPC code: LES
- NPC: National Paralympic Committee of Lesotho

in Athens
- Competitors: 2 in 1 sport
- Flag bearer: Sello Mothebe
- Medals: Gold 0 Silver 0 Bronze 0 Total 0

Summer Paralympics appearances (overview)
- 2000; 2004; 2008; 2012; 2016; 2020; 2024

Lesotho competed at the 2004 Summer Paralympics in Athens, Greece. In their second Paralympic Games, they were represented by 2 sportspeople, neither of whom medaled.

== Sports ==
=== Athletics ===
==== Men's track ====
Athlete	Class	Event	Heats		Semifinal		Final	
Athlete	Class	Event	Result	Rank	Result	Rank	Result	Rank
Sello Mothebe	T12	100m	12.51	25	did not advance			

==== Women's track ====
Athlete	Class	Event	Heats		Semifinal		Final	
Athlete	Class	Event	Result	Rank	Result	Rank	Result	Rank
Limpho Rakoto	T46	100m	14.52	11	did not advance			

== See also ==
- Lesotho at the Paralympics
- Lesotho at the 2004 Summer Olympics
