= Botswana at the 2008 Summer Paralympics =

- IPC code: BOT
- NPC: Paralympic Association of Botswana

in Beijing
- Competitors: 0 in 0 sports
- Medals Ranked -th: Gold 0 Silver 0 Bronze 0 Total 0

Summer Paralympics appearances (overview)
- 2004; 2008; 2012; 2016; 2020; 2024

Botswana was disqualified from participating in the 2008 Summer Paralympics in Beijing. Tshotlego Morama, who had won gold in the women's 400m sprint in the T46 disability category at the Athens Paralympics, was the country's sole representative. However, Morama had to withdraw from the competition due to injury, and the athletes that had been submitted as replacements failed to meet the qualifying criteria having not participated international events.

== Athletics ==
Women

Athlete	Class	Event	Heats		Semifinal		Final		
Athlete	Class	Event	Result	Rank	Result	Rank	Result	Points	Rank
Tshotlego Morama	T46	100 m	Did not start						

== See also ==
- 2008 Summer Paralympics
- Botswana at the Paralympics
- Botswana at the 2008 Summer Olympics
