= Amy Winters =

Australian Paralympic athlete

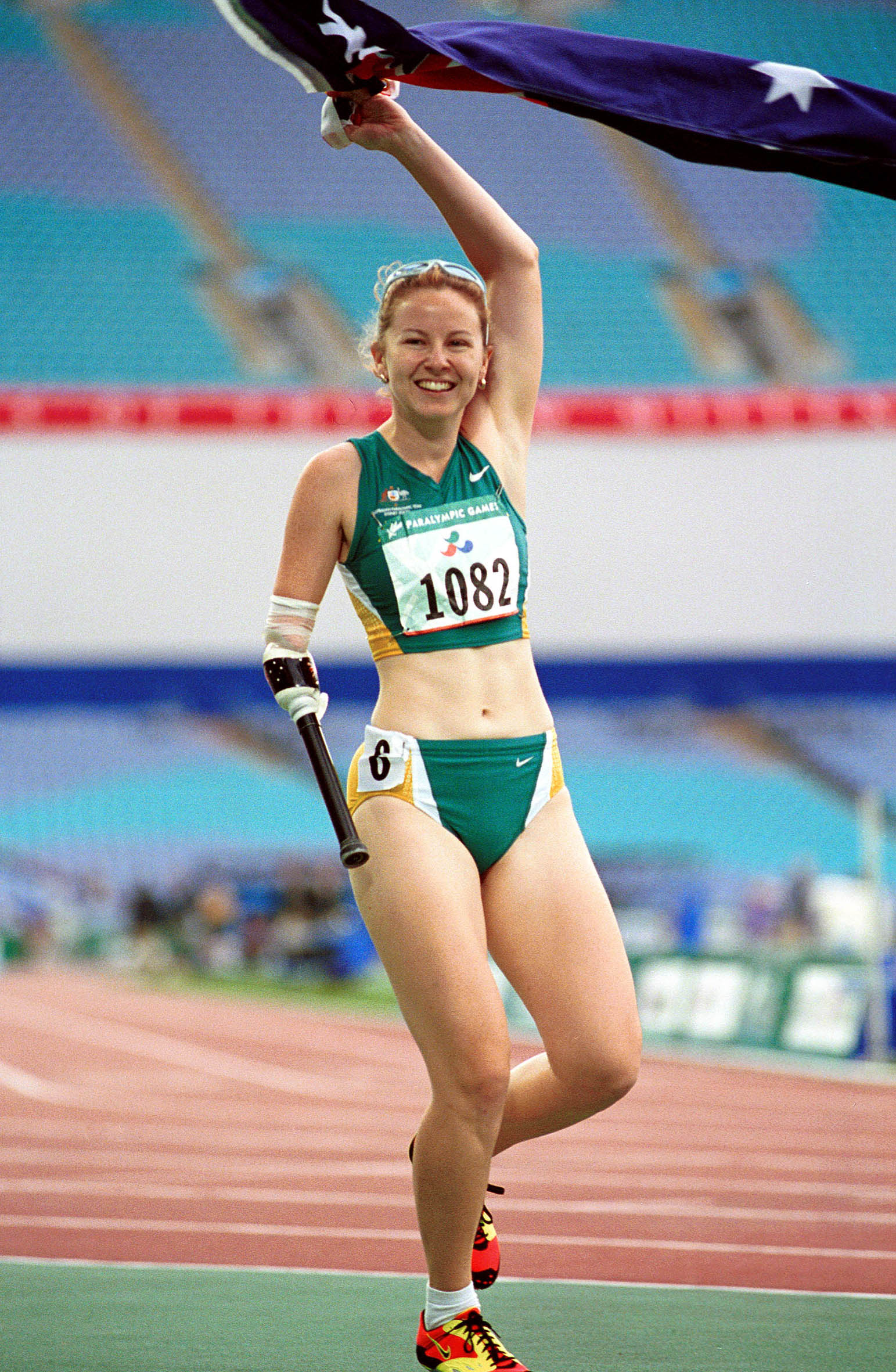
- Winters celebrates her gold medal winning run in the 100 m T46 at the 2000 Summer Paralympics.

Personal information
- Full name: Amy Louise Winters
- Nationality: Australia
- Born: 19 March 1978 (age 48) Kempsey, New South Wales
Medal record
Athletics
Paralympic Games
Gold medal – first place	1996 Atlanta	Women's 200 m T42-46
Gold medal – first place	2000 Sydney	Women's 100 m T46
Gold medal – first place	2000 Sydney	Women's 200 m T46
Gold medal – first place	2004 Athens	Women's 100 m T46
Gold medal – first place	2004 Athens	Women's 200 m T46
Bronze medal – third place	1996 Atlanta	Women's 100 m T42-46
Bronze medal – third place	2000 Sydney	Women's 400 m T46
IPC Athletics World Championships
Gold medal – first place	1998 Birmingham	Women's 100 m T46
Gold medal – first place	1998 Birmingham	Women's 200 m T46
Silver medal – second place	1994 Berlin	Women's 100 m T46
Silver medal – second place	1994 Berlin	Women's 200 m T46
Silver medal – second place	1994 Berlin	Women's Long Jump F46

Amy Louise Winters, OAM (born 19 March 1978) is an arm amputee Australian Paralympic athlete. She won seven medals at three Paralympic Games, including five gold medals.

== Career ==
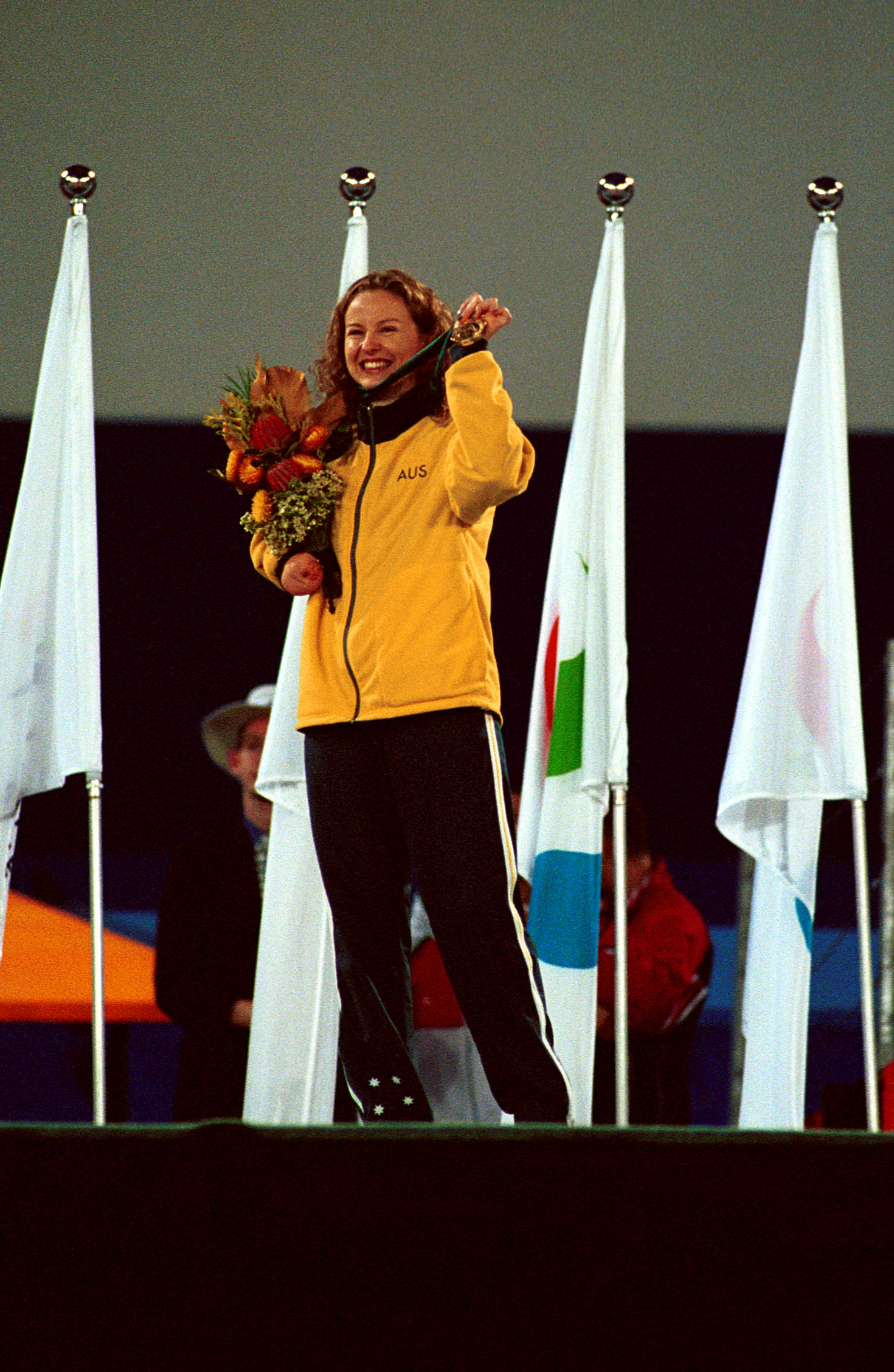
Winters celebrates one of her two gold medal wins at the 2000 Summer Paralympics

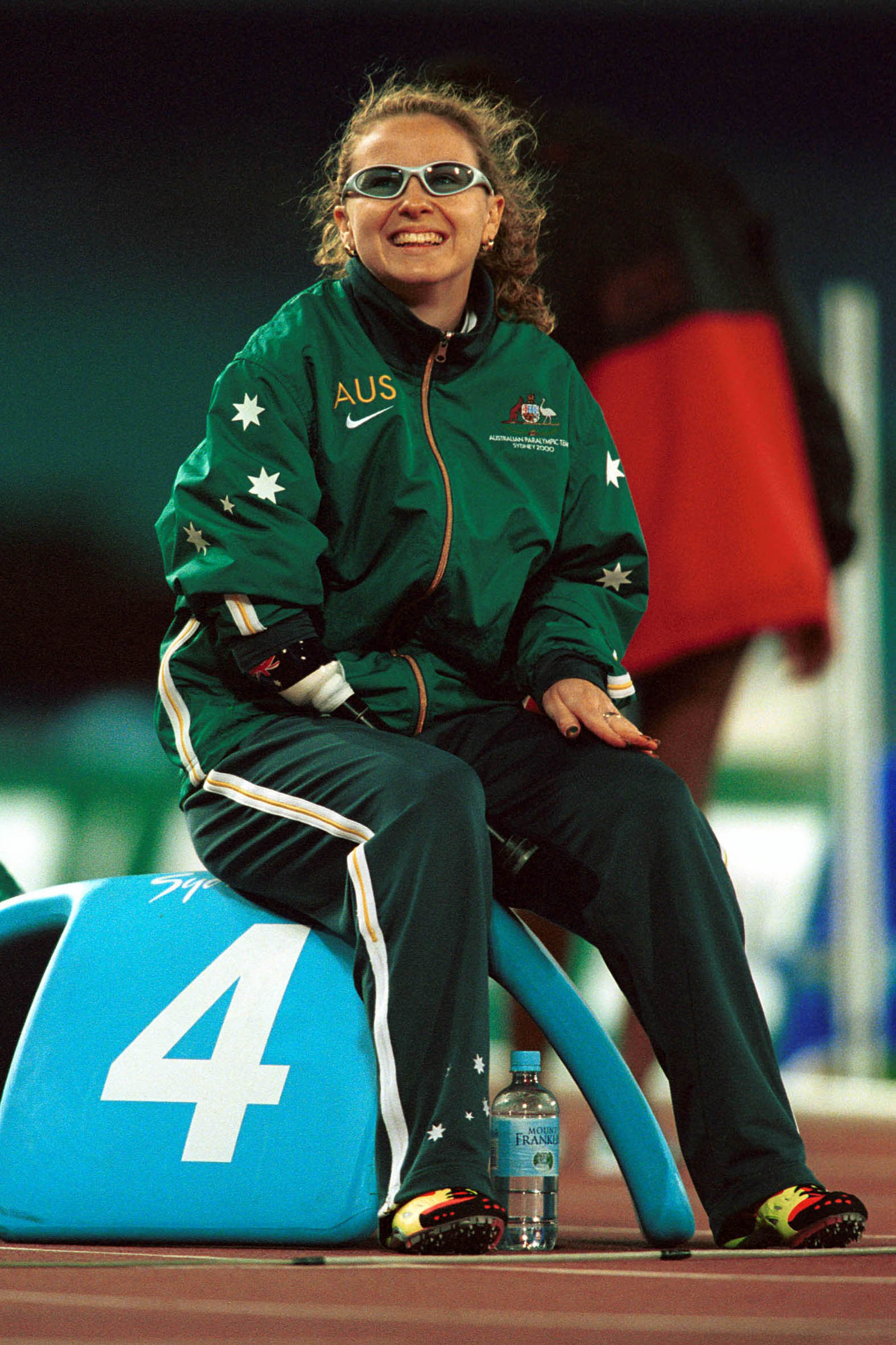
Winters shown smiling pre race at the 2000 Summer Paralympics

She was born in Kempsey, New South Wales, and was born without her lower right arm. Winters has two older sisters. and she attended Kempsey High School.

Whilst living in Kempsey, she was coached by Lloyd Smith. At the 1994 IPC Athletics World Championships in Berlin, she won silver medals in the Women's 100m, 200m and long jump T45-46 events.

Upon finishing school in 1995, she moved to Coffs Harbour to train with Glenn Thacker before relocating to Canberra to train with Chris Nunn prior to the Atlanta Games.

She made her ParalympicGames debut as an 18-year-old at the 1996 Atlanta Games. Winters won a gold medal in the Women's 200m T42-46 event, for which she received a Medal of the Order of Australia, and a bronze medal in the Women's 100m T42-46 event. After the Atlanta Games, she worked briefly with Kempsey Shire Council before moving to Sydney where she was offered a job with Westpac. Her role later came under the Paralympic Employment Program for elite athletes with disabilities. Once she moved to Sydney she was coached by Col Wright.

At the 1998 IPC Athletics World Championships in Birmingham, she won gold medals in the Women's 100m and 200m T46 events.

At 2000 Sydney Games, she won two gold medals in the 100m T46 and 200m T46 events, and a bronze medal in the 400m T46 event. She felt under enormous pressure going into the Sydney Games due to being the 200m title holder from Atlanta. She said "I did feel a lot of pressure, but the greatest pressure I felt was the pressure I put on myself. I remember before my final in the 200m, I felt like I was going to be physically sick. I’d never felt like that before. My usual mindset was ‘whatever happens, happens."

In late 2001, Winters decided to take some time out from sport. She resumed training in late 2002, this time training with Fira Dvoskina in Sydney. In the lead up to the Athens Games she was an Australian Institute of Sport scholarship holder and was coached by Iryna Dvoskina. At the 2004 Athens Games, she won two more gold medals in the 100m and 200m T46 events. Winning the 200m gold medal in Athens made Winters the first Paralympian in Australia to win three successive titles. In 2005, Winters retired from competing.

Winters and her husband, Sean, had their first child, Tom, in January 2010 and welcomed Sam in October 2013. Working for the Australian Paralympic Committee since 2005 as a Development Officer and then as the Manager, Education, Winters helped to create both the Paralympic Talent Search Program and the Paralympic Education Program. In 2008, she became the Marketing and Sponsorship Manager and travelled to Beijing and London, liaising closely with the APC's sponsors. Winters commentated the athletics competitions for the ABC at both the 2008 Beijing Paralympic Games and the 2011 Christchurch IPC Athletics World Championships.

On 24 July 2012, Amy was inducted into the New South Wales Hall of Champions at the Sydney Olympic Park Sports Centre. Winters stated that "The Hall of Champions is an illustrious list of many of the greats of Australian sport and to be considered amongst that group is extremely humbling."

== Recognition ==
- 1996 - OAM
- 1998 - Captain of Australian Athletics Team "Team of the Year", Paralympian of the Year Awards
- 1999 - Athlete of the Year (AWD), Sport NSW Annual Awards
- 2000 - Vice-Captain, Australian Paralympic Team, Sydney 2000 Paralympic Games
- 2000 - Australian Sports Medal
- 2004 - ACT Sports Star of the Year (September)
- 2004 - Female Athlete of the Year, Paralympian of the Year Awards
- 2005 - Female Athlete of the Year (AWD), Athletics Australia Athlete of the Year Awards
- 2009 - inducted in the Little Athletics Roll of Excellence
- 2012 - inducted into New South Wales Hall of Champions
- 2014 - inducted into the Sydney Olympic Park Athletic Centre Path of Champions
