= Lesotho at the 2020 Summer Paralympics =

- IPC code: LES
- NPC: National Paralympic Committee of Lesotho

in Tokyo
- Competitors: 1 in 1 sport
- Medals: Gold - Silver - Bronze - Total

Summer appearances
- 2000 • 2004 • 2008 • 2012 • 2016 • 2020 • 2024

Lesotho competed at the 2020 Summer Paralympics in Tokyo, Japan, from 24 August to 5 September 2021.

== Athletics ==
Field

Athlete	Event	Heats		Final	
Athlete	Event	Result	Rank	Result	Rank
Litsitso Khotlele	Women's discus throw F64				

== See also ==
- Lesotho at the 2020 Summer Olympics
