= Elena Chistilina =

Russian Paralympic athlete

Medal record

Track and field (T46)

Representing Russia

Paralympic Games
Silver medal – second place	2008 Beijing	100m - T46
Bronze medal – third place	2004 Athens	100m - T46
Bronze medal – third place	2004 Athens	200m - T46

Elena Chistilina is a Paralympic athlete from Russia competing mainly in category T46 sprint events.

She competed in the 2004 Summer Paralympics in Athens, Greece. There she won a bronze medal in the women's 100 metres - T46 event, a bronze medal in the women's 200 metres - T46 event and finished eighth in the women's 400 metres - T46 event. She also competed at the 2008 Summer Paralympics in Beijing, China. There she won a silver medal in the women's 100 metres - T46 event and finished fifth in the women's 200 metres - T46 event
