= Alicja Jeromin =

Polish Paralympic athlete (born 1985)

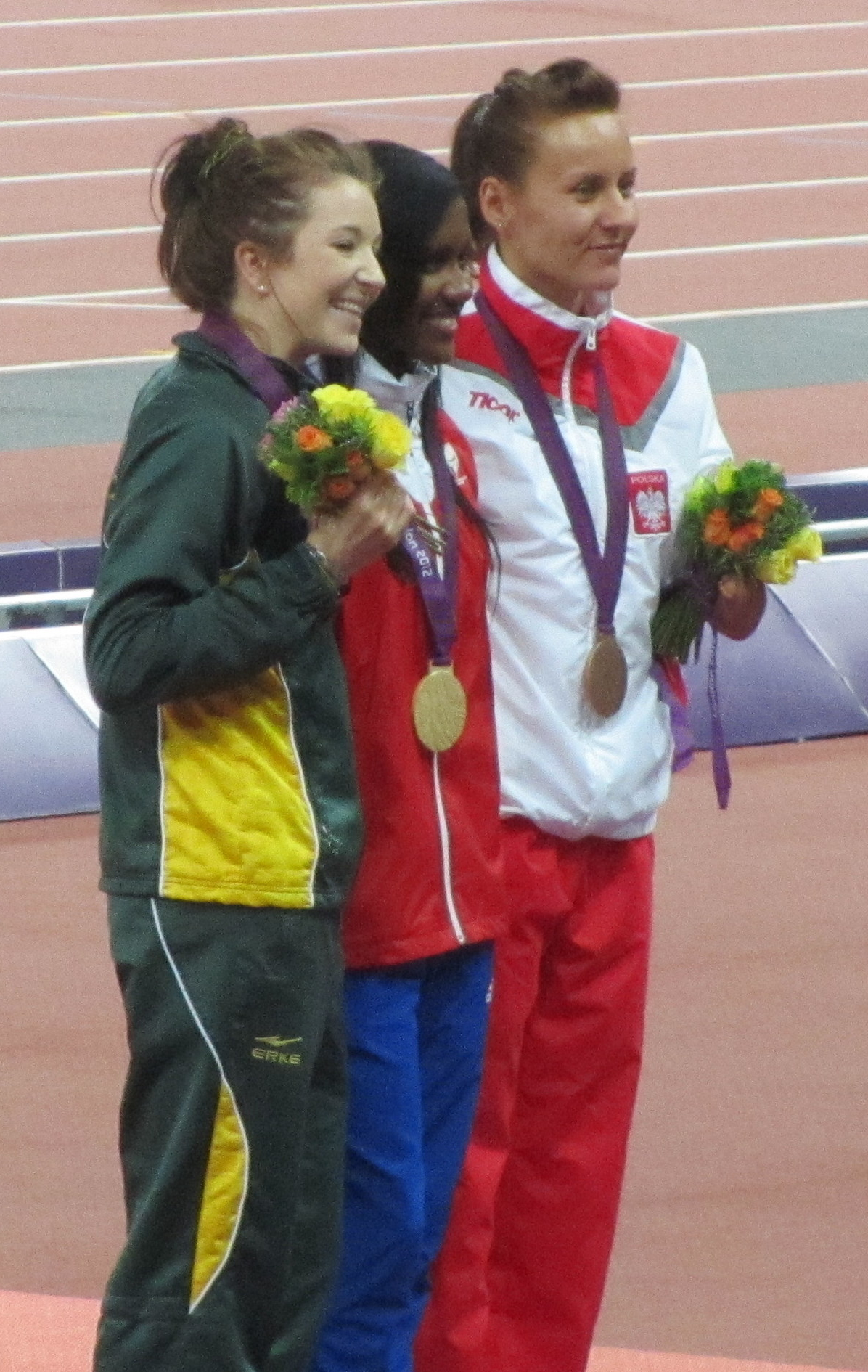
- Jeromin (right) at the 2012 Paralympics 400m T46 victory ceremony.

Personal information
- Full name: Alicja Anna Jeromin
- Nationality: Poland
- Born: Alicja Fiodorow; 22 May 1985 (age 41) Kozienice

Sport
- Country: Poland
- Sport: Athletics
- Event: T46 sprint
Medal record
Track and field
Representing Poland
Paralympic Games
Silver medal – second place	2008 Beijing	200m - T46
Silver medal – second place	2012 London	200m - T46
Silver medal – second place	2016 Rio de Janeiro	100m - T47
Silver medal – second place	2016 Rio de Janeiro	200m - T47
Bronze medal – third place	2004 Athens	400m - T46
Bronze medal – third place	2008 Beijing	100m - T46
Bronze medal – third place	2012 London	400m - T46
Bronze medal – third place	2020 Tokyo	200m - T47
IPC World Championships
Bronze medal – third place	2011 Christchurch	400m - T46
Bronze medal – third place	2013 Lyon	100m - T46
Bronze medal – third place	2013 Lyon	200m - T46
Bronze medal – third place	2015 Doha	100m - T47
IPC European Championships
Gold medal – first place	2014 Swansea	400m - T47
Gold medal – first place	2016 Grosseto	100m - T47
Gold medal – first place	2016 Grosseto	200m - T47
Silver medal – second place	2014 Swansea	100m - T47

Alicja Anna Jeromin (née Fiodorow; born May 22, 1985) is a Paralympic athlete from Poland competing mainly in category T46 sprint events.

She competed in the 2004 Summer Paralympics in Athens, Greece. There she won a bronze medal in the women's 400 metres - T46 event, finished fourth in the women's 100 metres - T46 event and finished fourth in the women's 200 metres - T46 event. Competing in the 2008 Summer Paralympics in Beijing, China, she won a silver medal in the women's 200 metres - T46 event and a bronze medal in the women's 100 metres - T46 event.

At the 2012 Summer Paralympics in London, she won a silver medal in the women's 200 metres T46 event.

At the 2020 Summer Paralympics, she won the bronze medal in Women's 200 metres T47.
