= Edwin Masuge =

Motswana sprinter (born 2000)

Personal information
- Nickname: Tiger
- Born: 4 March 2000 (age 26) Moshupa, Botswana

Sport
- Country: Botswana
- Sport: Athletics
- Disability class: T13
- Events: 100 metres, 200 metres, and 400 metres
- Coached by: Nason Maotwe

Achievements and titles
- Personal bests: 200 metres: 22.65 (2026); 400 metres: 50.50 (2026)
- Updated on 25 August 2026

Edwin Masuge (born 4 March 2000) is a Motswana sprinter. He qualified for the 2020 Summer Paralympics and 2024 Summer Paralympics where he competed in the men's 400 metres T13 event. Masuge has participated in four World Para Athletics Championships, primarily competing in the 400 metres T13 events.

Although Masuge's disability class is T13, he has competed in some T12 events during competitions including the 2019 World Para Athletics Championships and the Toyota National Championships. Masuge has been nominated and has won awards at the Botswana Sport Awards several times in categories revolving athletes with disabilities.

== Early life and education ==
Masuge was born in Moshupa, Botswana on 4 March 2000. Due to his poor vision, he attended Matsieng Primary School in Mochudi, Botswana, where he first found his love for athletics. Masuge stated that he attended his first competition while there under the Botswana Primary School Sports Association, however he reported that his result was poor. Masuge was first coached by his teacher Segomotso Rathokwane.

Masuge moved to Linchwe II Junior Secondary School in 2019, where he started training under coach Keatlaretse Mabote, a sprinter who participated in the 2016 Summer Paralympics. Masuge's first regional competition was the 2016 Region 5 Games in Angola, where teammates including Karabo Sibanda gave him the nickname "Tiger". T13, Masuge's disability class, classifies people who have partial vision. The International Blind Sports Federation (IBSA) defines this classification as "From visual acuity above 2/60 to visual acuity of 6/60 and/or visual field of more than 5 degrees and less than 20 degrees."

== Career ==
=== Summer Paralympics ===
At the 2020 Summer Paralympics held in Tokyo, Japan, Masuge represented Botswana and competed in the men's 400 metres T13 event. Masuge qualified for the final after finishing fourth in his heat with a time of 50.13 seconds. In the final he finished with a time of 50.54 seconds, ranking 7th overall in the competition. Following this, Masuge took a break from athletics to focus on school. At the 2024 Summer Paralympics held in Paris, France, Masuge represented Botswana and competed in the men's 400 metres T13 event. In the final, Masuge finished with a time of 49.38 seconds, ranking 5th overall in the competition.

=== World Para Athletics Championships ===
At the 2019 World Para Athletics Championships held in Dubai, United Arab Emirates, Masuge represented Botswana and competed in the men's 400 metres T12 event. He advanced from his heat with a personal best time of 52.30 seconds. He went on to compete in the first semifinal, finishing with a time of 53.29 seconds to rank 11th overall in the competition. At the 2023 World Para Athletics Championships held in Paris, France, Masuge represented Botswana and competed in the men's 400 metres T13 event. Masuge qualified for the final after finishing fourth in his heat with a time of 50.50 seconds. In the final he finished with a time of 50.67 seconds, ranking 8th overall in the competition.

At the 2024 World Para Athletics Championships held in Kobe, Japan, Masuge represented Botswana and competed in the men's 400 metres T13 event. Masuge qualified for the final after finishing second in his heat with a time of 50.44 seconds. In the final he finished with a time of 50.57 seconds, ranking 5th overall in the competition. At the 2025 World Para Athletics Championships held in New Delhi, India, Masuge represented Botswana and competed in the men's 400 metres T13 event. Masuge qualified for the final after finishing third in his heat with a time of 51.82 seconds. In the final he finished with a time of 51.65 seconds, ranking 6th overall in the competition.

=== Other events ===
Masuge won a silver medal in the 100 and 400 metres T13 category and a bronze in the 200 metres events during the 2015 Botswana Games in Francistown, Botswana; and at the 2017 Botswana Games he secured three gold medals across the 100, 200, and 400 metres T13 events. In the 2018 South African Athletics Championships he won two silver medals in both the 200 and 400 metre races. Masuge secured a gold medal at the African Union Sports Council Region 5 U20 Games in 2018. During the 2021 Toyota National Championships in Port Elizabeth, South Africa, Masuge secured a gold medal by winning the 200 metres T12 race. Masuge is a beneficiary of Betway's Delta Bay (Pty) Ltd.

== Awards and nominations ==
Awards and nominations received by Edwin Masuge
Year	Category	Event	Result	Ref(s).
2022	Male Sportsperson with a Disability	41st Botswana Sport Awards	Won	
2023	Male Sportsperson with a Disability	42nd Botswana Sport Awards	Won	
2024	Male Sportsperson with a Disability	43rd Botswana Sport Awards	Nominated	
2025	Male Sportsperson with a Disability	44th Botswana Sport Awards	Won	
2026	Male Sportsperson with a Disability	45th Botswana Sport Awards	Nominated	
2026	Sportsman of the Year with a Disability	2026 Regional Annual Sports Awards	Nominated	
