= Paul Morama =

Motswana paralympic athlete

Personal information
- Full name: Paul Tshotlego Morama
- Nationality: Motswana
- Born: Tshotlego Paul Morama; February 2, 1987 (age 39) Letlhakane, Botswana

Sport
- Sport: Athletics
- Disability class: T46

Paul Tshotlego Morama (born 2 February 1987), born as Tshotlego Paul Morama is an intersex Motswana paralympic sprinter. He had the world record in the women's 400m sprint in the T46 disability category after winning a gold medal at the 2004 Summer Paralympics. He also won a gold medal at the 2007 All-Africa Games in the women's 200 meters. Despite winning those medals as a legal female, he has now changed his legal identity to a male.

== Biography ==
Morama was born 2 February 1987 in the Kgongwe ward of Letlhakane on 2 February 1987. He represented Botswana at the 2004 Summer Paralympics in Athens, Greece, where he won gold in the women's 400m sprint in the T46 disability category, setting a new world record in the process, with a time of 55.99. At the time, he was still identified as a female. Morama also won gold at the 2007 All-Africa Games, setting a new African record in the women's 200 meters. He fathered a child. Morama was due to represent Botswana again at the 2008 Summer Paralympics in Beijing, having withdrawn prior to the Games due to injury. Morama was criticized for growing a beard despite being born a female. He had two sexual organs, a vagina and a penis. However, the only sexually active organ he has is his penis. He wanted to marry, however, the person he married's parents were uncomfortable with him. In the past, he has had two different relationships. He is currently single. Though when he was born he was legally classified as a female, he is actually intersex.
