= List of Paralympic medalists in judo =

Para judo has been part of the Paralympic Games program since 1988 where only male judoka participated, women began to compete at the 2004 Summer Paralympics. B1, B2 and B3 judoka have all competed against each other since the sport was introduced in the Summer Paralympics, the J1 (B1) and J2 (B2) classifications will be competed separately in the 2024 Summer Paralympics.

== Men ==
=== Extra lightweight ===
This weightclass was split into two classifications - J1 and J2 - in 2024.

- 60 kg (1988-2020)

| Event | Gold | Silver | Bronze |
|---|---|---|---|
| 1988 Seoul | Simon Jackson; Great Britain | Mokoto Shinkawa; Japan | Jaime De Oliveira; Brazil |
| 1988 Seoul | Simon Jackson; Great Britain | Mokoto Shinkawa; Japan | John Allen; United States |
| 1992 Barcelona | Nobuhiro Kanki; Japan | Veniamin Mitchourine; Unified Team | Davide Albertini; Italy |
| 1992 Barcelona | Nobuhiro Kanki; Japan | Veniamin Mitchourine; Unified Team | Cheung Woon-Noh; South Korea |
| 1996 Atlanta | Lee Ching Chung; Chinese Taipei | Nobuhiro Kanki; Japan | Kim Il Keun; South Korea |
| 1996 Atlanta | Lee Ching Chung; Chinese Taipei | Nobuhiro Kanki; Japan | Veniamin Mitchourine; Russia |
| 2000 Sydney | Sergio Arturo Perez; Cuba | Veniamin Mitchourine; Russia | José Carlos Ruiz; Spain |
| 2000 Sydney | Sergio Arturo Perez; Cuba | Veniamin Mitchourine; Russia | Lee Ching Chung; Chinese Taipei |
| 2004 Athens | None | Makoto Hirose; Japan | Ihor Zasyadkovych; Ukraine |
| 2004 Athens | None | Makoto Hirose; Japan | Norbert Biro; Hungary |
| 2008 Beijing | Mouloud Noura; Algeria | Saeed Rahmati; Iran | Ramin Ibrahimov; Azerbaijan |
| 2008 Beijing | Mouloud Noura; Algeria | Saeed Rahmati; Iran | Li Xiaodong; China |
| 2012 London | Ramin Ibrahimov; Azerbaijan | Li Xiaodong; China | Mouloud Noura; Algeria |
| 2012 London | Ramin Ibrahimov; Azerbaijan | Li Xiaodong; China | Ben Quilter; Great Britain |
| 2016 Rio de Janeiro | Sherzod Namozov; Uzbekistan | Makoto Hirose; Japan | Alex Bologa; Romania |
| 2016 Rio de Janeiro | Sherzod Namozov; Uzbekistan | Makoto Hirose; Japan | Uugankhuu Bolormaa; Mongolia |
| 2020 Tokyo | Vugar Shirinli; Azerbaijan | Anuar Sariyev; Kazakhstan | Recep Ciftci; Turkey |
| 2020 Tokyo | Vugar Shirinli; Azerbaijan | Anuar Sariyev; Kazakhstan | Alex Bologa; Romania |

- 60 kg J1 (2024-)

| Event | Gold | Silver | Bronze |
|---|---|---|---|
| 2024 Paris | Abdelkader Bouamer; Algeria | Meysam Banitaba; Iran | Marcos Dennis Blanco; Venezuela |
| 2024 Paris | Abdelkader Bouamer; Algeria | Meysam Banitaba; Iran | Kapil Parmar; India |

- 60 kg J2 (2024-)

| Event | Gold | Silver | Bronze |
|---|---|---|---|
| 2024 Paris | Sherzod Namozov; Uzbekistan | Zurab Zurabiani; Georgia | Ishak Ouldkouider; Algeria |
| 2024 Paris | Sherzod Namozov; Uzbekistan | Zurab Zurabiani; Georgia | Davyd Khorava; Ukraine |

=== Half lightweight ===
This weightclass was paused in 2024.

- 65 kg (1988-1996)
- 66 kg (2000-)

| Event | Gold | Silver | Bronze |
|---|---|---|---|
| 1988 Seoul | Shinichi Ishizue; Japan | Rene Duchemin; France | Júlio Silva; Brazil |
| 1988 Seoul | Shinichi Ishizue; Japan | Rene Duchemin; France | Pier Morten; Canada |
| 1992 Barcelona | Juan Damián Matos; Spain | Shinichi Ishizue; Japan | Akhmed Gazimagomedov; Unified Team |
| 1992 Barcelona | Juan Damián Matos; Spain | Shinichi Ishizue; Japan | Michael Murch; Great Britain |
| 1996 Atlanta | Satoshi Fujimoto; Japan | Akhmed Gazimagomedov; Russia | Marlon Lopez; United States |
| 1996 Atlanta | Satoshi Fujimoto; Japan | Akhmed Gazimagomedov; Russia | Cyril Morel; France |
| 2000 Sydney | Satoshi Fujimoto; Japan | David Garcia; Spain | Marlon Lopez; United States |
| 2000 Sydney | Satoshi Fujimoto; Japan | David Garcia; Spain | Oleg Chabachov; Russia |
| 2004 Athens | Satoshi Fujimoto; Japan | David Garcia; Spain | Jani Kallunki; Finland |
| 2004 Athens | Satoshi Fujimoto; Japan | David Garcia; Spain | Xu Zhilin; China |
| 2008 Beijing | Sid Ali Lamri; Algeria | Satoshi Fujimoto; Japan | Jani Kallunki; Finland |
| 2008 Beijing | Sid Ali Lamri; Algeria | Satoshi Fujimoto; Japan | Victor Sanchez; Cuba |
| 2012 London | Davyd Khorava; Ukraine | Zhao Xu; China | Sid Ali Lamri; Algeria |
| 2012 London | Davyd Khorava; Ukraine | Zhao Xu; China | Marcos Falcón; Venezuela |
| 2016 Rio de Janeiro | Utkirjon Nigmatov; Uzbekistan | Bayram Mustafayev; Azerbaijan | Davyd Khorava; Ukraine |
| 2016 Rio de Janeiro | Utkirjon Nigmatov; Uzbekistan | Bayram Mustafayev; Azerbaijan | Satoshi Fujimoto; Japan |
| 2020 Tokyo | Uchkun Kuranbaev; Uzbekistan | Sergio Ibanez Banon; Spain | Yujiro Seto; Japan |
| 2020 Tokyo | Uchkun Kuranbaev; Uzbekistan | Sergio Ibanez Banon; Spain | Namig Abasli; Azerbaijan |

=== Lightweight ===
This weightclass was amended in 2000 from 71 kg to 73 kg, and then split into two classifications - J1 and J2 - in 2024.

- 71 kg (1988-1996)
- 73 kg (2000-2020)

| Event | Gold | Silver | Bronze |
|---|---|---|---|
| 1988 Seoul | An Yu-Sung; South Korea | Norio Kato (judoka); Japan | Paul Lewis; Great Britain |
| 1988 Seoul | An Yu-Sung; South Korea | Norio Kato (judoka); Japan | Eddie Morten; Canada |
| 1992 Barcelona | Simon Jackson; Great Britain | Mario Talavera; Spain | Pier Morten; Canada |
| 1992 Barcelona | Simon Jackson; Great Britain | Mario Talavera; Spain | Eiji Miyauchi; Japan |
| 1996 Atlanta | Takio Ushikubo; Japan | Gérald Rollo; France | Stephen Moore; United States |
| 1996 Atlanta | Takio Ushikubo; Japan | Gérald Rollo; France | Cui Baoji; China |
| 2000 Sydney | Stephen Moore; United States | Cui Baoji; China | Pier Morten; Canada |
| 2000 Sydney | Stephen Moore; United States | Cui Baoji; China | Gérald Rollo; France |
| 2004 Athens | Wang Yunfeng; China | Eduardo Amaral; Brazil | Hani Asakereh; Iran |
| 2004 Athens | Wang Yunfeng; China | Eduardo Amaral; Brazil | Stephen Moore; United States |
| 2008 Beijing | Eduardo Ávila; Mexico | Xu Zhilin; China | Fábian Ramírez; Argentina |
| 2008 Beijing | Eduardo Ávila; Mexico | Xu Zhilin; China | Sergii Sydorenko; Ukraine |
| 2012 London | Dmytro Solovey; Ukraine | Sharif Khalilov; Uzbekistan | Eduardo Ávila; Mexico |
| 2012 London | Dmytro Solovey; Ukraine | Sharif Khalilov; Uzbekistan | Shakhban Kurbanov; Russia |
| 2016 Rio de Janeiro | Ramil Gasimov; Azerbaijan | Dmytro Solovey; Ukraine | Feruz Sayidov; Uzbekistan |
| 2016 Rio de Janeiro | Ramil Gasimov; Azerbaijan | Dmytro Solovey; Ukraine | Nikolai Kornhass; Germany |
| 2020 Tokyo | Feruz Sayidov; Uzbekistan | Temirzhan Daulet; Kazakhstan | Rufat Mahomedov; Ukraine |
| 2020 Tokyo | Feruz Sayidov; Uzbekistan | Temirzhan Daulet; Kazakhstan | Osvaldas Bareikis; Lithuania |

- 73 kg J1 (2024-)

| Event | Gold | Silver | Bronze |
|---|---|---|---|
| 2024 Paris | Alex Bologa; Romania | Yergali Shamey; Kazakhstan | Lennart Sass; Germany |
| 2024 Paris | Alex Bologa; Romania | Yergali Shamey; Kazakhstan | Djibrilo Iafa; Portugal |

- 73 kg J2 (2024-)

| Event | Gold | Silver | Bronze |
|---|---|---|---|
| 2024 Paris | Yujiro Seto; Japan | Giorgi Kaldani; Georgia | Uchkun Kuranbaev; Uzbekistan |
| 2024 Paris | Yujiro Seto; Japan | Giorgi Kaldani; Georgia | Osvaldas Bareikis; Lithuania |

=== Half middleweight ===
This weightclass was amended from 78 kg to 81 kg in 2000. The weightclass was paused in 2024.

- 78 kg (1988-1996)
- 81 kg (2000-)

| Event | Gold | Silver | Bronze |
|---|---|---|---|
| 1988 Seoul | Takio Ushikubo; Japan | Yu Do-Sang; South Korea | Terence Powell; Great Britain |
| 1988 Seoul | Takio Ushikubo; Japan | Yu Do-Sang; South Korea | David McKinley; United States |
| 1992 Barcelona | Joel Gichtenaere; France | Brett Lewis; United States | Takio Ushikubo; Japan |
| 1992 Barcelona | Joel Gichtenaere; France | Brett Lewis; United States | Matteo Ardit; Italy |
| 1996 Atlanta | Simon Jackson; Great Britain | Fábian Ramírez; Argentina | Eugenio Santana; Spain |
| 1996 Atlanta | Simon Jackson; Great Britain | Fábian Ramírez; Argentina | Jonas Stoškus; Lithuania |
| 2000 Sydney | Rafael Cruz Alonso; Cuba | Sébastien Le Meaux; France | Gabor Vincze; Hungary |
| 2000 Sydney | Rafael Cruz Alonso; Cuba | Sébastien Le Meaux; France | Simon Jackson; Great Britain |
| 2004 Athens | Cyril Jonard; France | Yuji Kato; Japan | Sebastian Junk; Germany |
| 2004 Athens | Cyril Jonard; France | Yuji Kato; Japan | Gabor Vincze; Hungary |
| 2008 Beijing | Isao Cruz Alonso; Cuba | Cyril Jonard; France | Jorge Lencina; Argentina |
| 2008 Beijing | Isao Cruz Alonso; Cuba | Cyril Jonard; France | Reinaldo Carvallo; Venezuela |
| 2012 London | Oleksandr Kosinov; Ukraine | José Effron; Argentina | Isao Cruz Alonso; Cuba |
| 2012 London | Oleksandr Kosinov; Ukraine | José Effron; Argentina | Matthias Krieger; Germany |
| 2016 Rio de Janeiro | Eduardo Ávila; Mexico | Lee Jung Min; South Korea | Rovshan Safarov; Azerbaijan |
| 2016 Rio de Janeiro | Eduardo Ávila; Mexico | Lee Jung Min; South Korea | Oleksandr Kosinov; Ukraine |
| 2020 Tokyo | Huseyn Rahimli; Azerbaijan | Davurkhon Karomatov; Uzbekistan | Eduardo Ávila; Mexico |
| 2020 Tokyo | Huseyn Rahimli; Azerbaijan | Davurkhon Karomatov; Uzbekistan | Lee Jung Min; South Korea |

=== Middleweight ===
This weightclass was amended from 86 kg to 90 kg in 2000, and split into two classifications - J1 and J2 - in 2024.

- 86 kg (1988-1996)
- 90 kg (2000-2020)

| Event | Gold | Silver | Bronze |
|---|---|---|---|
| 1988 Seoul | Yasuhiro Uwano; Japan | David Hurst; Great Britain | Kenneth Henningsson; Sweden |
| 1988 Seoul | Yasuhiro Uwano; Japan | David Hurst; Great Britain | Daniel Fourcade; France |
| 1992 Barcelona | An Yu-Sung; South Korea | Yasuhiro Uwano; Japan | Lin Der-chang; Chinese Taipei |
| 1992 Barcelona | An Yu-Sung; South Korea | Yasuhiro Uwano; Japan | Daniel Fourcade; France |
| 1996 Atlanta | Antônio Tenório; Brazil | Francisco Boedo; Spain | An Yu-Sung; South Korea |
| 1996 Atlanta | Antônio Tenório; Brazil | Francisco Boedo; Spain | Ian Rose; Great Britain |
| 2000 Sydney | Antônio Tenório; Brazil | Brett Lewis; United States | David Guillaume; France |
| 2000 Sydney | Antônio Tenório; Brazil | Brett Lewis; United States | An Yu-Sung; South Korea |
| 2004 Athens | Messaoud Nine; Algeria | Oleg Kretsul; Russia | Jonas Stoškus; Lithuania |
| 2004 Athens | Messaoud Nine; Algeria | Oleg Kretsul; Russia | Raul Fernandez; Spain |
| 2008 Beijing | Oleg Kretsul; Russia | Tofig Mammadov; Azerbaijan | Olivier Cugnon de Sévricourt; France |
| 2008 Beijing | Oleg Kretsul; Russia | Tofig Mammadov; Azerbaijan | Sam Ingram; Great Britain |
| 2012 London | Jorge Hierrezuelo; Cuba | Sam Ingram; Great Britain | Jorge Lencina; Argentina |
| 2012 London | Jorge Hierrezuelo; Cuba | Sam Ingram; Great Britain | Dartanyon Crockett; United States |
| 2016 Rio de Janeiro | Zviad Gogotchuri; Georgia | Oleksandr Nazarenko; Ukraine | Shukhrat Boboev; Uzbekistan |
| 2016 Rio de Janeiro | Zviad Gogotchuri; Georgia | Oleksandr Nazarenko; Ukraine | Dartanyon Crockett; United States |
| 2020 Tokyo | Vahid Nouri; Iran | Elliot Stewart; Great Britain | Helios Latchoumanaya; France |
| 2020 Tokyo | Vahid Nouri; Iran | Elliot Stewart; Great Britain | Oleksandr Nazarenko; Ukraine |

- 90 kg J1 (2024-)

| Event | Gold | Silver | Bronze |
|---|---|---|---|
| 2024 Paris | Arthur Cavalcante da Silva; Brazil | Daniel Powell; Great Britain | Cyril Jonard; France |
| 2024 Paris | Arthur Cavalcante da Silva; Brazil | Daniel Powell; Great Britain | Oleg Crețul; Moldova |

- 90 kg J2 (2024-)

| Event | Gold | Silver | Bronze |
|---|---|---|---|
| 2024 Paris | Oleksandr Nazarenko; Ukraine | Hélios Latchoumanaya; France | Davurkhon Karomatov; Uzbekistan |
| 2024 Paris | Oleksandr Nazarenko; Ukraine | Hélios Latchoumanaya; France | Marcelo Casanova; Brazil |

=== Half heavyweight ===
This weightclass was amended from 95 kg to 100 kg in 2000. The weightclass was subsumed into the +90kg 'open' classes, both J1 and J2, in 2024.

- 95 kg (1992-1996)
- 100 kg (2000-)

| Event | Gold | Silver | Bronze |
|---|---|---|---|
| 1992 Barcelona | Osamu Takagaki; Japan | Lynn Manning; United States | Mikhail Yakovlev; Unified Team |
| 1992 Barcelona | Osamu Takagaki; Japan | Lynn Manning; United States | Klaus Heyer; Germany |
| 1996 Atlanta | Anthony Clarke; Australia | Run Ming Men; China | James Mastro; United States |
| 1996 Atlanta | Anthony Clarke; Australia | Run Ming Men; China | Terence Powell; Great Britain |
| 2000 Sydney | Walter Hanl; Austria | Grigory Shneyderman; Russia | Run Ming Men; China |
| 2000 Sydney | Walter Hanl; Austria | Grigory Shneyderman; Russia | Yoshikazu Matsumoto; Japan |
| 2004 Athens | Antônio Tenório; Brazil | Run Ming Men; China | Sébastien Le Meaux; France |
| 2004 Athens | Antônio Tenório; Brazil | Run Ming Men; China | Kevin Szott; United States |
| 2008 Beijing | Antônio Tenório; Brazil | Karim Sardarov; Azerbaijan | Juan Carlos Cortada; Cuba |
| 2008 Beijing | Antônio Tenório; Brazil | Karim Sardarov; Azerbaijan | Mykola Lyivytskyi; Ukraine |
| 2012 London | Choi Gwang Geun; South Korea | Myles Porter; United States | Antônio Tenório; Brazil |
| 2012 London | Choi Gwang Geun; South Korea | Myles Porter; United States | Vladimir Fedin; Russia |
| 2016 Rio de Janeiro | Choi Gwang Geun; South Korea | Antônio Tenório; Brazil | Yordani Fernandez Sastre; Cuba |
| 2016 Rio de Janeiro | Choi Gwang Geun; South Korea | Antônio Tenório; Brazil | Shirin Sharipov; Uzbekistan |
| 2020 Tokyo | Chris Skelley; Great Britain | Ben Goodrich; United States | Sharif Khalilov; Uzbekistan |
| 2020 Tokyo | Chris Skelley; Great Britain | Ben Goodrich; United States | Anatoliy Shevchenko; RPC |

=== Heavyweight ===
This weightclass, the 'open' weightclass, was set at +95 kg in 1988, amended to +100 kg in 2000, before being subsumed in the +90 kg J1 and J2 classifications in 2024.

The 'open' +90 kg class is considered the 'heavyweight' class despite being partially within the previous 'half-heavyweight' limits.

- +95 kg (1988-1996)
- +100 kg (2000-)

| Event | Gold | Silver | Bronze |
|---|---|---|---|
| 1988 Seoul | Masakazu Saito; Japan | Walter Monti; Italy | Leonel Cunha Maraes Filho; Brazil |
| 1988 Seoul | Masakazu Saito; Japan | Walter Monti; Italy | David Hodgkins; Great Britain |
| 1992 Barcelona | Masakazu Saito; Japan | None | James Mastro; United States |
| 1992 Barcelona | Masakazu Saito; Japan | None | Franz Gatscher; Italy |
| 1996 Atlanta | Walter Hanl; Austria | Kevin Szott; United States | Osamu Takagaki; Japan |
| 1996 Atlanta | Walter Hanl; Austria | Kevin Szott; United States | Eric Censier; France |
| 2000 Sydney | Kevin Szott; United States | Rafael Moreno; Spain | Eiji Miyauchi; Japan |
| 2000 Sydney | Kevin Szott; United States | Rafael Moreno; Spain | Martin Osewald; Germany |
| 2004 Athens | Ilham Zakiyev; Azerbaijan | Ian Rose; Great Britain | Keiji Amakawa; Japan |
| 2004 Athens | Ilham Zakiyev; Azerbaijan | Ian Rose; Great Britain | Rafael Torres Pompa; Cuba |
| 2008 Beijing | Ilham Zakiyev; Azerbaijan | Wang Song; China | Greg DeWall; United States |
| 2008 Beijing | Ilham Zakiyev; Azerbaijan | Wang Song; China | Julien Taurines; France |
| 2012 London | Kento Masaki; Japan | Wang Song; China | Ilham Zakiyev; Azerbaijan |
| 2012 London | Kento Masaki; Japan | Wang Song; China | Yangaliny Jiménez Domínguez; Cuba |
| 2016 Rio de Janeiro | Adiljan Tulendibaev; Uzbekistan | Wilians Silva de Araújo; Brazil | Yangaliny Jiménez Domínguez; Cuba |
| 2016 Rio de Janeiro | Adiljan Tulendibaev; Uzbekistan | Wilians Silva de Araújo; Brazil | Kento Masaki; Japan |
| 2020 Tokyo | Mohammadreza Kheirollahzadeh; Iran | Revaz Chikoidze; Georgia | Ilham Zakiyev; Azerbaijan |
| 2020 Tokyo | Mohammadreza Kheirollahzadeh; Iran | Revaz Chikoidze; Georgia | Choi Gwang Geun; South Korea |

- +90 kg J1 (2024-)

| Event | Gold | Silver | Bronze |
|---|---|---|---|
| 2024 Paris | Wilians Silva de Araújo; Brazil | Ion Basoc; Moldova | Jason Grandry; France |
| 2024 Paris | Wilians Silva de Araújo; Brazil | Ion Basoc; Moldova | Ilham Zakiyev; Azerbaijan |

- +90 kg J2 (2024-)

| Event | Gold | Silver | Bronze |
|---|---|---|---|
| 2024 Paris | İbrahim Bölükbaşı; Turkey | Revaz Chikoidze; Georgia | Zhurkamyrza Shukurbekov; Kazakhstan |
| 2024 Paris | İbrahim Bölükbaşı; Turkey | Revaz Chikoidze; Georgia | Chris Skelley; Great Britain |

== Women ==
=== Extra lightweight ===
- 48kg (2004-)

| Event | Gold | Silver | Bronze |
|---|---|---|---|
| 2004 Athens | Karima Medjeded; France | Karla Cardoso; Brazil | Viktoriya Potapova; Russia |
| 2004 Athens | Karima Medjeded; France | Karla Cardoso; Brazil | Astrid Arndt; Germany |
| 2008 Beijing | Guo Hua Ping; China | Karla Cardoso; Brazil | Viktoriya Potapova; Russia |
| 2008 Beijing | Guo Hua Ping; China | Karla Cardoso; Brazil | Carmen Brussig; Germany |
| 2012 London | Carmen Brussig; Germany | Lee Kai-lin; Chinese Taipei | Viktoriya Potapova; Russia |
| 2012 London | Carmen Brussig; Germany | Lee Kai-lin; Chinese Taipei | Yuliya Halinska; Ukraine |
| 2016 Rio de Janeiro | Li Liqing; China | Carmen Brussig; Germany | Yuliya Halinska; Ukraine |
| 2016 Rio de Janeiro | Li Liqing; China | Carmen Brussig; Germany | Ecem Tasin; Turkey |
| 2020 Tokyo | Shahana Hajiyeva; Azerbaijan | Sandrine Martinet; France | Viktoriya Potapova; RPC |
| 2020 Tokyo | Shahana Hajiyeva; Azerbaijan | Sandrine Martinet; France | Yuliya Halinska; Ukraine |

=== Half lightweight ===
- 52kg (2004-)

| Event | Gold | Silver | Bronze |
|---|---|---|---|
| 2004 Athens | Susann Schützel; Germany | Sandrine Aurieres; France | Wang Qiu Lian; China |
| 2004 Athens | Susann Schützel; Germany | Sandrine Aurieres; France | Alexandra Vlasova; Russia |
| 2008 Beijing | Cui Na; China | Sandrine Aurieres-Martinet; France | Alesia Stepaniuk; Russia |
| 2008 Beijing | Cui Na; China | Sandrine Aurieres-Martinet; France | Michele Ferreira; Brazil |
| 2012 London | Ramona Brussig; Germany | Wang Lijing; China | Michele Ferreira; Brazil |
| 2012 London | Ramona Brussig; Germany | Wang Lijing; China | Nataliya Nikolaychyk; Ukraine |
| 2016 Rio de Janeiro | Sandrine Martinet; France | Ramona Brussig; Germany | Cherine Abdellaoui; Algeria |
| 2016 Rio de Janeiro | Sandrine Martinet; France | Ramona Brussig; Germany | Sevinch Salaeva; Uzbekistan |
| 2020 Tokyo | Cherine Abdellaoui; Algeria | Priscilla Gagne; Canada | Alesia Stepaniuk; RPC |
| 2020 Tokyo | Cherine Abdellaoui; Algeria | Priscilla Gagne; Canada | Nataliya Nikolaychyk; Ukraine |

=== Lightweight ===
- 57kg (2004-)

| Event | Gold | Silver | Bronze |
|---|---|---|---|
| 2004 Athens | Ramona Brussig; Germany | Marta Arce Payno; Spain | Ekaterina Buzmakova; Russia |
| 2004 Athens | Ramona Brussig; Germany | Marta Arce Payno; Spain | Daniele Silva; Brazil |
| 2008 Beijing | Wang Lijing; China | Ramona Brussig; Germany | Monica Merenciano; Spain |
| 2008 Beijing | Wang Lijing; China | Ramona Brussig; Germany | Daniele Silva; Brazil |
| 2012 London | Afag Sultanova; Azerbaijan | Lucia Araujo; Brazil | Monica Merenciano; Spain |
| 2012 London | Afag Sultanova; Azerbaijan | Lucia Araujo; Brazil | Duygu Cete; Turkey |
| 2016 Rio de Janeiro | Inna Cherniak; Ukraine | Lucia Araujo; Brazil | Junko Hirose; Japan |
| 2016 Rio de Janeiro | Inna Cherniak; Ukraine | Lucia Araujo; Brazil | Seo Ha Na; South Korea |
| 2020 Tokyo | Sevda Valiyeva; Azerbaijan | Parvina Samandarova; Uzbekistan | Lucia Araujo; Brazil |
| 2020 Tokyo | Sevda Valiyeva; Azerbaijan | Parvina Samandarova; Uzbekistan | Zeynep Çelik; Turkey |

=== Half middleweight ===
- 63kg (2004-)

| Event | Gold | Silver | Bronze |
|---|---|---|---|
| 2004 Athens | Madina Kazakova; Russia | Silke Huettler; Germany | Angelique Quessandier; France |
| 2004 Athens | Madina Kazakova; Russia | Silke Huettler; Germany | Monica Merenciano; Spain |
| 2008 Beijing | Naomi Soazo; Venezuela | Marta Arce Payno; Spain | Madina Kazakova; Russia |
| 2008 Beijing | Naomi Soazo; Venezuela | Marta Arce Payno; Spain | Angelique Quessandier; France |
| 2012 London | Dalidaivis Rodriguez; Cuba | Zhou Tong; China | Marta Arce Payno; Spain |
| 2012 London | Dalidaivis Rodriguez; Cuba | Zhou Tong; China | Daniele Bernardes Milan; Brazil |
| 2016 Rio de Janeiro | Dalidaivis Rodriguez; Cuba | Iryna Husieva; Ukraine | Jin Song Lee; South Korea |
| 2016 Rio de Janeiro | Dalidaivis Rodriguez; Cuba | Iryna Husieva; Ukraine | Tursunpashsha Nurmetova; Uzbekistan |
| 2020 Tokyo | Khanim Huseynova; Azerbaijan | Iryna Husieva; Ukraine | Wang Yue; China |
| 2020 Tokyo | Khanim Huseynova; Azerbaijan | Iryna Husieva; Ukraine | Nafisa Sheripboeva; Uzbekistan |

=== Middleweight ===
- 70kg (2004-)

| Event | Gold | Silver | Bronze |
|---|---|---|---|
| 2004 Athens | Carmen Herrera; Spain | Lorena Pierce; United States | Sándorné Nagy; Hungary |
| 2004 Athens | Carmen Herrera; Spain | Lorena Pierce; United States | Tatiana Savostyanova; Russia |
| 2008 Beijing | Carmen Herrera; Spain | Lenia Ruvalcaba; Mexico | Tatiana Savostyanova; Russia |
| 2008 Beijing | Carmen Herrera; Spain | Lenia Ruvalcaba; Mexico | Sanneke Vermeulen; Netherlands |
| 2012 London | Carmen Herrera; Spain | Tatiana Savostyanova; Russia | Zhou Qian; China |
| 2012 London | Carmen Herrera; Spain | Tatiana Savostyanova; Russia | Nikolett Szabo; Hungary |
| 2016 Rio de Janeiro | Lenia Ruvalcaba; Mexico | Alana Martins; Brazil | Naomi Soazo; Venezuela |
| 2016 Rio de Janeiro | Lenia Ruvalcaba; Mexico | Alana Martins; Brazil | Gulruh Rahimova; Uzbekistan |
| 2020 Tokyo | Alana Martins; Brazil | Ina Kaldani; Georgia | Kazusa Ogawa; Japan |
| 2020 Tokyo | Alana Martins; Brazil | Ina Kaldani; Georgia | Lenia Ruvalcaba; Mexico |

=== Heavyweight ===
- +70kg (2004-)

| Event | Gold | Silver | Bronze |
|---|---|---|---|
| 2004 Athens | Xue Lan Mei; China | Maria Olmedo; Spain | Beate Bischler; Germany |
| 2008 Beijing | Yuan Yanping; China | Deanne Silva; Brazil | Irina Kalyanova; Russia |
| 2008 Beijing | Yuan Yanping; China | Deanne Silva; Brazil | Zoubida Bouazoug; Algeria |
| 2012 London | Yuan Yanping; China | Nazan Akin; Turkey | Zoubida Bouazoug; Algeria |
| 2012 London | Yuan Yanping; China | Nazan Akin; Turkey | Irina Kalyanova; Russia |
| 2016 Rio de Janeiro | Yuan Yanping; China | Khayitjon Alimova; Uzbekistan | Mesme Tasbag; Turkey |
| 2016 Rio de Janeiro | Yuan Yanping; China | Khayitjon Alimova; Uzbekistan | Christella Garcia; United States |
| 2020 Tokyo | Dursadaf Karimova; Azerbaijan | Zarina Baibatina; Kazakhstan | Meg Emmerich; Brazil |
| 2020 Tokyo | Dursadaf Karimova; Azerbaijan | Zarina Baibatina; Kazakhstan | Carolina Costa; Italy |

== Multiple medalists ==
This is a list of multiple Paralympic judo medalists, listing people who have won two or more Paralympic gold medals or more than five medals.

Updated to Tokyo 2024.

This list may not be complete, as the information from the International Paralympic Committee (IPC) website is based on sources which does not present all information from earlier Paralympic Games (1960–1984).

| No. | Athlete | Nation | Category | Sex | 1st place, gold medalist(s) | 2nd place, silver medalist(s) | 3rd place, bronze medalist(s) | Total |
|---|---|---|---|---|---|---|---|---|
| 1 | Antônio Tenório | Brazil | Middleweight, Half-heavyweight | M | 4 | 1 | 1 | 6 |
| 2 | Satoshi Fujimoto | Japan | Half-lightweight | M | 3 | 1 | 1 | 5 |
| 3 | Simon Jackson | Great Britain | Half-lightweight, Lightweight, Half-middleweight | M | 3 | 0 | 1 | 4 |
| 4 | Carmen Herrera | Spain | Middleweight | F | 3 | 0 | 0 | 3 |
| 4 | Yuan Yanping | China | Heavyweight | F | 3 | 0 | 0 | 3 |
| 6 | Ramona Brussig | Germany | Half-lightweight, Lightweight | F | 2 | 2 | 0 | 4 |
| 7 | Ilham Zakiyev | Azerbaijan | Heavyweight | M | 2 | 0 | 3 | 5 |
| 8 | An-Yu Sung | South Korea | | M | 2 | 0 | 2 | 4 |
| 9 | Choi Gwan Geun | South Korea | Half-heavyweight, Heavyweight | M | 2 | 0 | 1 | 3 |
| 9 | Takio Ushikubo | Japan | | M | 2 | 0 | 1 | 3 |
| 10 | Masakazu Saito | Japan | Heavyweight | M | 2 | 0 | 0 | 2 |
| 10 | Dalidaivis Rodríguez | Cuba | Half-middleweight | F | 2 | 0 | 0 | 2 |
| 10 | Sherzod Namozov | Uzbekistan | Extra-lightweight | M | 2 | 0 | 0 | 2 |

== See also ==
- List of Olympic medalists in judo
