= Cuba at the Paralympics =

- IPC code: CUB
- NPC: Comité Paralimpico Cubano
- Medals: Gold 49 Silver 23 Bronze 29 Total 101

Summer appearances
- 1992; 1996; 2000; 2004; 2008; 2012; 2016; 2020; 2024

Cuba first competed at the Paralympic Games in 1992. It has participated in every Summer Paralympics since then, but has never taken part in the Winter Paralympics. The country has won a total of 49 gold, 23 silver, and 29 bronze medals.

== Medals by Games ==
Games	Gold	Silver	Bronze	Total
1992 Barcelona	3	3	3	9
1996 Atlanta	8	3	0	11
2000 Sydney	4	2	2	8
2004 Athens	2	2	7	11
2008 Beijing	5	3	6	14
2012 London	9	5	3	17
2016 Rio de Janeiro	8	1	6	15
2020 Tokyo	4	1	1	6
2024 Paris	6	3	1	10
Totals (9 entries)	49	23	29	101

=== Medals by sport ===
Sport	Gold	Silver	Bronze	Total
Athletics	32	17	18	67
Judo	6	0	7	13
Swimming	1	2	2	5
Totals (3 entries)	39	19	27	85

== Medalists ==
Medal	Name	Games	Sport	Event
Gold	Enrique Cepeda	(Spain) 1992 Barcelona	Athletics	Men's triple jump B3
Gold	Oscar Pupo	(Spain) 1992 Barcelona	Athletics	Men's 800m B1
Gold	Omar Turro	(Spain) 1992 Barcelona	Athletics	Men's 400m B2
Silver	Oscar Pupo	(Spain) 1992 Barcelona	Athletics	Men's 400m B1
Silver	Omar Turro	(Spain) 1992 Barcelona	Athletics	Men's 100m B2
Silver	Ernesto Garrido	(Spain) 1992 Barcelona	Swimming	Men's 50m freestyle S10
Bronze	Gustavo Ariosa	(Spain) 1992 Barcelona	Athletics	Men's javelin throw THW5
Bronze	Enrique Cepeda	(Spain) 1992 Barcelona	Athletics	Men's 100m B3
Bronze	Omar Turro	(Spain) 1992 Barcelona	Athletics	Men's 200m B2
Gold	Omar Moya	(United States) 1996 Atlanta	Athletics	Men's 200m T11
Gold	Omar Moya	(United States) 1996 Atlanta	Athletics	Men's 400m T11
Gold	Ambrosio Zaldivar	(United States) 1996 Atlanta	Athletics	Men's 400m T12
Gold	Diosmani Gonzalez	(United States) 1996 Atlanta	Athletics	Men's 10,000m T12
Gold	Enrique Caballero	(United States) 1996 Atlanta	Athletics	Men's long jump F12
Gold	Enrique Caballero	(United States) 1996 Atlanta	Athletics	Men's triple jump F12
Gold	Guillermo Perez	(United States) 1996 Atlanta	Athletics	Men's javelin throw F42
Gold	Liiudys Beliser	(United States) 1996 Atlanta	Athletics	Women's discus throw F10-11
Silver	Enrique Caballero	(United States) 1996 Atlanta	Athletics	Men's 100m T12
Silver	Diosmani Gonzalez	(United States) 1996 Atlanta	Athletics	Men's 5000m T12
Silver	Liiudys Beliser	(United States) 1996 Atlanta	Athletics	Women's javelin throw F10-11
Gold	Enrique Cepeda	(Australia) 2000 Sydney	Athletics	Men's long jump F13
Gold	Liudys Masso	(Australia) 2000 Sydney	Athletics	Women's discus throw F13
Gold	Sergio Arturo Perez	(Australia) 2000 Sydney	Judo	Men's 60 kg
Gold	Rafael Cruz Alonso	(Australia) 2000 Sydney	Judo	Men's 81 kg
Silver	Diosmany Santana	(Australia) 2000 Sydney	Athletics	Men's 10,000m T12
Silver	Gustavo Ariosa	(Australia) 2000 Sydney	Athletics	Men's javelin throw F54
Bronze	Diosmany Santana	(Australia) 2000 Sydney	Athletics	Men's 5000m T12
Bronze	Gustavo Ariosa	(Australia) 2000 Sydney	Athletics	Men's discus throw F54
Gold	Ángel Jimenez	(Greece) 2004 Athens	Athletics	Men's long jump F13
Gold	Ana Jimenez	(Greece) 2004 Athens	Athletics	Women's long jump F13
Silver	Diosmani Gonzalez	(Greece) 2004 Athens	Athletics	Men's 10,000m T13
Silver	Irving Bustamante; Enrique Cepeda; Fernando Gonzalez; Adrian Iznaga	(Greece) 2004 Athens	Athletics	Men's 4 × 100 m relay T11-13
Bronze	Irving Bustamante	(Greece) 2004 Athens	Athletics	Men's 100m T13
Bronze	Irving Bustamante	(Greece) 2004 Athens	Athletics	Men's 200m T13
Bronze	Yunieski Abreu	(Greece) 2004 Athens	Athletics	Men's 5000m T13
Bronze	Gerdan Fonseca	(Greece) 2004 Athens	Athletics	Men's shot put F44/46
Bronze	Ana Jimenez	(Greece) 2004 Athens	Athletics	Women's 100m T13
Bronze	Noralvis de Las Heras	(Greece) 2004 Athens	Athletics	Women's shot put F42-46
Bronze	Rafael Torres Pompa	(Greece) 2004 Athens	Judo	Men's +100 kg
Gold	Luis Manuel Galano	(China) 2008 Beijing	Athletics	Men's 400 metres T13
Gold	Leonardo Diaz	(China) 2008 Beijing	Athletics	Men's discus throw F55-56
Gold	Yunidis Castillo	(China) 2008 Beijing	Athletics	Women's 100 metres T46
Gold	Yunidis Castillo	(China) 2008 Beijing	Athletics	Women's 200 metres T46
Gold	Isao Cruz	(China) 2008 Beijing	Judo	Men's 81 kg
Silver	Freddy Durruthy	(China) 2008 Beijing	Athletics	Men's 400 metres T13
Silver	Lazaro Raschid Aguilar	(China) 2008 Beijing	Athletics	Men's 800 metres T12
Silver	Lazaro Raschid Aguilar	(China) 2008 Beijing	Athletics	Men's 1500 metres T13
Bronze	Luis Felipe Gutierrez	(China) 2008 Beijing	Athletics	Men's 100 metres T13
Bronze	Arian Iznaga	(China) 2008 Beijing	Athletics	Men's 200 metres T11
Bronze	Ettiam Calderon	(China) 2008 Beijing	Athletics	Men's 200 metres T46
Bronze	Gerdan Fonseca	(China) 2008 Beijing	Athletics	Men's shot put F44
Bronze	Victor Sanchez	(China) 2008 Beijing	Judo	Men's 66 kg
Bronze	Juan Carlos Cortada	(China) 2008 Beijing	Judo	Men's 100 kg
Gold	Luis Felipe Gutierrez	(United Kingdom) 2012 London	Athletics	Men's long jump F13
Gold	Yunidis Castillo	(United Kingdom) 2012 London	Athletics	Women's 100m T46
Gold	Yunidis Castillo	(United Kingdom) 2012 London	Athletics	Women's 200m T46
Gold	Yunidis Castillo	(United Kingdom) 2012 London	Athletics	Women's 400m T46
Gold	Omara Durand	(United Kingdom) 2012 London	Athletics	Women's 100m T13
Gold	Omara Durand	(United Kingdom) 2012 London	Athletics	Women's 400m T13
Gold	Leonardo Diaz	(United Kingdom) 2012 London	Athletics	Men's discus throw F54-56
Gold	Jorge Hierrezuelo Marcillis	(United Kingdom) 2012 London	Judo	Men's -90 kg
Gold	Dalidaivis Rodriguez Clark	(United Kingdom) 2012 London	Judo	Women's -63 kg
Silver	Angel Jimenez Cabeza	(United Kingdom) 2012 London	Athletics	Men's long jump F13
Silver	Luis Felipe Gutierrez	(United Kingdom) 2012 London	Athletics	Men's 100m T13
Silver	Raciel Gonzalez Isidoria	(United Kingdom) 2012 London	Athletics	Men's 100m T46
Silver	Raciel Gonzalez Isidoria	(United Kingdom) 2012 London	Athletics	Men's 200m T46
Silver	Lorenzo Perez Escalona	(United Kingdom) 2012 London	Swimming	Men's 50m freestyle S6
Bronze	Isao Cruz Alonso	(United Kingdom) 2012 London	Judo	Men's -81 kg
Bronze	Yangaliny Jimenez Dominguez	(United Kingdom) 2012 London	Judo	Men's +100 kg
Bronze	Lorenzo Perez Escalona	(United Kingdom) 2012 London	Swimming	Men's 100m freestyle S6
Gold	Leinier Savon Pineda	(Brazil) 2016 Rio de Janeiro	Athletics	Men's 100 metres T12
Gold	Leinier Savon Pineda	(Brazil) 2016 Rio de Janeiro	Athletics	Men's 200 metres T12
Gold	Omara Durand	(Brazil) 2016 Rio de Janeiro	Athletics	Women's 100 metres T12
Gold	Omara Durand	(Brazil) 2016 Rio de Janeiro	Athletics	Women's 200 metres T12
Gold	Omara Durand	(Brazil) 2016 Rio de Janeiro	Athletics	Women's 400 metres T12
Gold	Ernesto Blanco	(Brazil) 2016 Rio de Janeiro	Athletics	Men's 400 metres T47
Gold	Dalidaivis Rodriguez	(Brazil) 2016 Rio de Janeiro	Judo	Women's −63 kg
Silver	Yunidis Castillo	(Brazil) 2016 Rio de Janeiro	Athletics	Women's long jump T47
Bronze	Leonardo Díaz	(Brazil) 2016 Rio de Janeiro	Athletics	Men's discus throw F56
Bronze	Malu Perez Iser	(Brazil) 2016 Rio de Janeiro	Athletics	Women's long jump T42
Bronze	Noraivis de la Heras Chibas	(Brazil) 2016 Rio de Janeiro	Athletics	Women's discus throw F43/44
Bronze	Yordani Fernandez Sastre	(Brazil) 2016 Rio de Janeiro	Judo	Men's −100 kg
Bronze	Yangaliny Jimenez	(Brazil) 2016 Rio de Janeiro	Judo	Men's +100 kg

=== Multi-medalists ===
Athletes who have won at least three medals. Bold athletes are athletes who are still active.

No.	Athlete	Sport	Years	Games	Gender	Gold	Silver	Bronze	Total
1	Yunidis Castillo	Athletics	2004-2016	4	F	5	1	0	6
2	Omara Durand	Athletics	2012-2016	2	F	5	0	0	5
3	Enrique Cepeda	Athletics	1992, 2000-2004	3	M	2	1	1	4
4	Enrique Caballero	Athletics	1996	1	M	2	1	0	3
4	Ángel Jiménez	Athletics	2004, 2012	2	M	2	1	0	3
6	Diosmani Gonzalez	Athletics	1996, 2004	2	M	1	2	0	3
7	Luis Felipe Gutiérrez	Athletics	2008-2016	3	M	1	1	1	3
7	Omar Turro	Athletics	1992, 2004	2	M	1	1	1	3
9	Gustavo Ariosa	Athletics	1992, 2000	2	M	0	1	2	3
9	Irving Bustamante	Athletics	2004	1	M	0	1	2	3

== See also ==
- Cuba at the Olympics
- All-time Paralympic Games medal table
