= Judo at the 2000 Summer Paralympics – Men's 81 kg =

Paralympic judo event

Men's 81kg at the XI Paralympic Games
- Venue: Sydney, Australia
- Competitors: 13 from 13 nations

Medalists
1st place, gold medalist(s)		Rafael Cruz Alonso	Cuba
2nd place, silver medalist(s)		Sébastien Le Meaux	France
3rd place, bronze medalist(s)		Simon Jackson	Great Britain
3rd place, bronze medalist(s)		Gabor Vincze	Hungary

The men's 81 kg judo event at the 2000 Summer Paralympics.

== Main round ==
Round of 16
Jonas Stoskus (LTU)	0001
Vasyl Dub (UKR)	1000S
Bill Morgan (CAN)	1010
Benjamin Aicheler (GER)	0000
Diego Poli (ITA)	0000
Kenichi Nakamura (JPN)	1010
Gabor Vincze (HUN)
Simon Jackson (GBR)	0000
Ray Dunmeyer (USA)	0000
Rafael Cruz Alonso (CUB)	1000

Quarterfinals
Sébastien Le Meaux (FRA)	0150
Vasyl Dub (UKR)	0000C
Bill Morgan (CAN)	0001
Kenichi Nakamura (JPN)	1010S
Simon Jackson (GBR)	0221
Tian Longbing (CHN)	0000S
Francisco Boedo (ESP)	0000S
Rafael Cruz Alonso (CUB)	1001

Semifinals
Sébastien Le Meaux (FRA)	1010S
Kenichi Nakamura (JPN)	0001C
Simon Jackson (GBR)	0000
Rafael Cruz Alonso (CUB)	0010

Final
Sébastien Le Meaux (FRA)	0000
Rafael Cruz Alonso (CUB)	0000 G

== Repechage ==
First round
Diego Poli (ITA)	0010S
Bill Morgan (CAN)	1012S
Gabor Vincze (HUN)	0200
Tian Longbing (CHN)	0100
Ray Dunmeyer (USA)	0001
Francisco Boedo (ESP)	1000

Second round
Vasyl Dub (UKR)	1002
Bill Morgan (CAN)	0000
Gabor Vincze (HUN)	1000
Francisco Boedo (ESP)	0000

Bronze medal matches
Vasyl Dub (UKR)	0010
Simon Jackson (GBR)	1000
Gabor Vincze (HUN)	1000
Kenichi Nakamura (JPN)	0000
