= Judo at the 2004 Summer Paralympics =

Judo Judo at the XII Paralympic Games
- Paralympic Judo
- Venue: Ano Liossia Olympic Hall
- Location: Greece
- Dates: 18–20 September 2004
- Competitors: 118 from 30 nations

Competition at external databases
- Links: JudoInside

Judo at the 2004 Summer Paralympics was competed by blind or vision-impaired judokas. The only classification was by body weight. The contests were staged in the Ano Liossia Olympic Hall.

== Participating countries ==
- Algeria (2)
- Argentina (2)
- Australia (2)
- Azerbaijan (1)
- Brazil (7)
- Canada (1)
- Chinese Taipei (10)
- Cuba (2)
- Finland (1)
- France (9)
- Germany (9)
- Great Britain (4)
- Greece (4)
- Hong Kong (1)
- Hungary (3)
- Iran (4)
- Ireland (2)
- Japan (7)
- South Korea (2)
- Lithuania (1)
- Malaysia (2)
- Russia (13)
- Spain (9)
- Thailand (1)
- Ukraine (5)
- United States (6)
- Uruguay (2)
- Venezuela (1)

== Medal table ==
Rank	Nation	Gold	Silver	Bronze	Total
1	Germany (GER)	2	1	3	6
2	China (CHN)	2	1	2	5
2	France (FRA)	2	1	2	5
4	Spain (ESP)	1	3	2	6
5	Brazil (BRA)	1	2	1	4
5	Japan (JPN)	1	2	1	4
7	Russia (RUS)	1	1	5	7
8	Algeria (ALG)	1	0	0	1
8	Azerbaijan (AZE)	1	0	0	1
10	United States (USA)	0	1	2	3
11	Great Britain (GBR)	0	1	0	1
12	Hungary (HUN)	0	0	3	3
13	Cuba (CUB)	0	0	1	1
13	Finland (FIN)	0	0	1	1
13	Iran (IRI)	0	0	1	1
13	Lithuania (LTU)	0	0	1	1
13	Ukraine (UKR)	0	0	1	1
Totals (17 entries)		12	13	26	51

The competition winner of the men's 60kg class, Sergio Arturo Perez (Cuba), received a warning and reprimand and lost his results and his gold medal after testing positive for the prohibited anti-inflammatory drug prednisolone.

== Medal summary ==
=== Men ===
Event	Gold	Silver	Bronze
Extra-lightweight (60 kg)	Not awarded	Makoto Hirose; Japan	Ihor Zasyadkovych; Ukraine
Extra-lightweight (60 kg)	Not awarded	Makoto Hirose; Japan	Norbert Bíró; Hungary
Half-lightweight (66 kg)	Satoshi Fujimoto; Japan	David Garcia del Valle; Spain	Jani Kallunki; Finland
Half-lightweight (66 kg)	Satoshi Fujimoto; Japan	David Garcia del Valle; Spain	Zhi Lin Xu; China
Lightweight (73 kg)	Yun Feng Wang; China	Eduardo Amaral; Brazil	Stephen Moore; United States
Lightweight (73 kg)	Yun Feng Wang; China	Eduardo Amaral; Brazil	Hani Asakereh; Iran
Half-middleweight (81 kg)	Cyril Jonard; France	Yuji Kato; Japan	Sebastian Junk; Germany
Half-middleweight (81 kg)	Cyril Jonard; France	Yuji Kato; Japan	Gábor Vincze; Hungary
Middleweight (90 kg)	Messaoud Nine; Algeria	Oleg Kretsul; Russia	Raul Fernández; Spain
Middleweight (90 kg)	Messaoud Nine; Algeria	Oleg Kretsul; Russia	Jonas Stoskus; Lithuania
Half-heavyweight (100 kg)	Antônio Tenório; Brazil	Run Ming Men; China	Sébastien Le Meaux; France
Half-heavyweight (100 kg)	Antônio Tenório; Brazil	Run Ming Men; China	Kevin Szott; United States
Heavyweight (+100 kg)	Ilham Zakiyev; Azerbaijan	Ian Rose; Great Britain	Keiji Amakawa; Japan
Heavyweight (+100 kg)	Ilham Zakiyev; Azerbaijan	Ian Rose; Great Britain	Rafael Torres Pompa; Cuba

=== Women ===
Event	Gold	Silver	Bronze
Extra-lightweight (48 kg)	Karima Medjeded; France	Karla Cardoso; Brazil	Astrid Arndt; Germany
Extra-lightweight (48 kg)	Karima Medjeded; France	Karla Cardoso; Brazil	Viktoriya Potapova; Russia
Half-lightweight (52 kg)	Susann Schützel; Germany	Sandrine Aurières; France	Qiu Lian Wang; China
Half-lightweight (52 kg)	Susann Schützel; Germany	Sandrine Aurières; France	Alexandra Vlasova; Russia
Lightweight (57 kg)	Ramona Brussig; Germany	Marta Arce Payno; Spain	Ekaterina Buzmakova; Russia
Lightweight (57 kg)	Ramona Brussig; Germany	Marta Arce Payno; Spain	Daniele Silva; Brazil
Half-middleweight (63 kg)	Madina Kazakova; Russia	Silke Huettler; Germany	Angelique Quessandier; France
Half-middleweight (63 kg)	Madina Kazakova; Russia	Silke Huettler; Germany	Monica Merenciano; Spain
Middleweight (70 kg)	Carmen Herrera; Spain	Lorena Pierce; United States	Tatiana Savostyanova; Russia
Middleweight (70 kg)	Carmen Herrera; Spain	Lorena Pierce; United States	Sándorné Nagy; Hungary
Heavyweight (+70 kg)	Lan Mei Xue; China	Maria Olmedo; Spain	Beate Bischler; Germany
Heavyweight (+70 kg)	Lan Mei Xue; China	Maria Olmedo; Spain	Nina Ivanova; Russia

== See also ==
- Judo at the 2004 Summer Olympics
