= Judo at the 2004 Summer Paralympics – Men's 73 kg =

Judo competition

Judo - Men's up to 73 kg at the XII Paralympic Games
- Paralympic Judo
- Venue: Ano Liossia Olympic Hall
- Dates: 19 September 2004
- Competitors: 12 from 12 nations

Medalists
1st place, gold medalist(s)		Wang Yun Feng	China
2nd place, silver medalist(s)		Eduardo Amaral	Brazil
3rd place, bronze medalist(s)		Hani Asakereh	Iran
3rd place, bronze medalist(s)		Stephen Moore	United States

The Men's up to 73 kg judo competition at the 2004 Summer Paralympics was held on 19 September at the Ano Liossia Olympic Hall.

The tournament bracket consisted of a single-elimination contest culminating in a gold medal match. There was also a repechage to determine the winners of the two bronze medals. Each judoka who had lost to a semifinalist competed in the repechage. The two judokas who lost in the semifinals faced the winner of the opposite half of the bracket's repechage in bronze medal bouts.

The event was won by Wang Yun Feng, representing China.

== Results ==
The four digits represent scores of ippon, waza-ari, yuko and koka (which was still used at the time). A letter indicates a penalty of shido, chui, keikoku or hansoku make, which (at the time) also registered a score of koka, yuko, waza-ari or ippon, respectively, to the opponent. Penalties are escalated, thus 2 shido = chui, 3 shido = keikoku, 4 shido = hansoku make, save that a penalty of hansoku make direct results in exclusion from the remainder of the competition, while if it results from escalation it does not.

=== Competition bracket ===
Round of 16
Matthias Krieger (GER)	99
Michael Doyle (IRL)	99
Simon Jackson MBE (GBR)	0001
Sergiy Sydorenko (UKR)	0010
Hani Asakereh (IRI)	1001
Fabian Ramirez (ARG)	0010S
Ravkhat Atnabaev (RUS)	0000
Wang Yun Feng (CHN)	1000

Quarterfinals
Gerald Rollo (FRA)	0002S
Matthias Krieger (GER)	1001S
Sergiy Sydorenko (UKR)	0100
Eduardo Amaral (BRA)	1000
Hani Asakereh (IRI)	0000
Stephen Moore (USA)	0001
Alexis Miclin Gonzalez (CUB)	0010
Wang Yun Feng (CHN)	1000

Semifinals
Matthias Krieger (GER)	0000
Eduardo Amaral (BRA)	1000
Stephen Moore (USA)	0000
Wang Yun Feng (CHN)	1001

Final
Eduardo Amaral (BRA)	0000
Wang Yun Feng (CHN)	1000

FG: Fusen-gachi = win by default

=== Repechage ===
First round
Ravkhat Atnabaev (RUS)	1000
Alexis Miclin Gonzalez (CUB)	0000

Second round
Gerald Rollo (FRA)	0001S
Sergiy Sydorenko (UKR)	1011S
Hani Asakereh (IRI)	1000
Ravkhat Atnabaev (RUS)	0000

Bronze medal matches
Sergiy Sydorenko (UKR)	0000
Stephen Moore (USA)	0200
Hani Asakereh (IRI)	0210
Matthias Krieger (GER)	0000
