= Cuba at the 2004 Summer Paralympics =

- IPC code: CUB
- NPC: Comité Paralimpico Cubano

in Athens
- Competitors: 24 in 4 sports
- Medals Ranked 43rd: Gold 2 Silver 2 Bronze 7 Total 11

Summer Paralympics appearances (overview)
- 1992; 1996; 2000; 2004; 2008; 2012; 2016; 2020; 2024

Cuba competed at the 2004 Summer Paralympics in Athens, Greece. The team included 24 athletes, 19 men and 5 women. Competitors from Cuba won 11 medals, including 2 gold, 2 silver and 7 bronze to finish 43rd in the medal table.

== Medallists ==
Medal	Name	Sport	Event
Gold	Ángel Jimenez	Athletics	Men's long jump F13
Gold	Ana Jimenez	Athletics	Women's long jump F13
Silver	Diosmani Gonzalez	Athletics	Men's 10000m T13
Silver	Irving Bustamante; Enrique Cepeda; Fernando Gonzalez; Adrian Iznaga	Athletics	Men's 4 × 100 m relay T11-13
Bronze	Irving Bustamante	Athletics	Men's 100m T13
Bronze	Irving Bustamante	Athletics	Men's 200m T13
Bronze	Yunieski Abreu	Athletics	Men's 5000m T13
Bronze	Gerdan Fonseca	Athletics	Men's shot put F44/46
Bronze	Ana Jimenez	Athletics	Women's 100m T13
Bronze	Noralvis de Las Heras	Athletics	Women's shot put F42-46
Bronze	Rafael Torres Pompa	Judo	Men's +100 kg

== Sports ==
=== Athletics ===
==== Men's track ====
Athlete	Class	Event	Heats		Semifinal		Final	
Athlete	Class	Event	Result	Rank	Result	Rank	Result	Rank
Yunieski Abreu	T13	800m	—				1:57.98	4
Yunieski Abreu	T13	1500m	4:07.41	13	did not advance			
Yunieski Abreu	T13	5000m	—				15:30.59	3rd place, bronze medalist(s)
Irving Bustamante	T13	100m	11.14	3 Q	—		11.24	3rd place, bronze medalist(s)
Irving Bustamante	T13	200m	23.05	7 Q	—		23.04	3rd place, bronze medalist(s)
Diosmani Gonzalez	T12	5000m	—				15:22.54	6
Diosmani Gonzalez	T13	1500m	4:19.95	20	did not advance			
Diosmani Gonzalez	T13	10000m	—				32:04.32	2nd place, silver medalist(s)
Adrian Iznaga	T11	100m	11.61	3 Q	11.93	9	did not advance	
Adrian Iznaga	T11	200m	23.97	4 q	23.89	4 q	23.78	4
Omar Turro	T12	200m	DNF		did not advance			
Omar Turro	T12	400m	52.73	6 Q	57.66	8	did not advance	
Irving Bustamante; Enrique Cepeda; Fernando Gonzalez; Adrian Iznaga; Ángel Jimenez	T11-13	4 × 100 m relay	44.15	3 q	—		44.60	2nd place, silver medalist(s)

==== Men's field ====
Athlete	Class	Event	Final		
Athlete	Class	Event	Result	Points	Rank
Enrique Cepeda	F12	Long jump	6.38	-	12
Enrique Cepeda	F12	Triple jump	14.39	-	4
Leonardo Diaz Aldana	F55-56	Javelin	28.65	894	11
Leonardo Diaz Aldana	F56	Discus	NMR		
Leonardo Diaz Aldana	F56	Shot put	9.31	-	13
Gerdan Fonseca	F44/46	Shot put	14.76	1016	3rd place, bronze medalist(s)
Fernando Gonzalez	F12	Long jump	6.52	-	10
Fernando Gonzalez	F12	Triple jump	13.14	-	8
Ángel Jimenez	F13	Long jump	7.15	-	1st place, gold medalist(s)
Jorge Jay Maso	F11	Long jump	5.96	-	4
Jorge Jay Maso	F11	Triple jump	12.51	-	4

==== Women's track ====
Athlete	Class	Event	Heats		Semifinal		Final	
Athlete	Class	Event	Result	Rank	Result	Rank	Result	Rank
Ana Jimenez	T13	100m	—				12.98	3rd place, bronze medalist(s)

==== Women's field ====
Athlete	Class	Event	Final		
Athlete	Class	Event	Result	Points	Rank
Yunidis Castillo	F44/46	Long jump	4.90	897	13
Noralvis de las Heras	F42-46	Discus	27.81	859	12
Noralvis de las Heras	F42-46	Javelin	25.66	691	10
Noralvis de las Heras	F42-46	Shot put	11.90 WR	1109	3rd place, bronze medalist(s)
Ana Jimenez	F13	Long jump	5.40	-	1st place, gold medalist(s)

=== Judo ===
Athlete	Event	Preliminary	Quarterfinals	Semifinals	Repechage round 1	Repechage round 2	Final/ Bronze medal contest
Athlete	Event	Opposition Result	Opposition Result	Opposition Result	Opposition Result	Opposition Result	Opposition Result
Rafael Cruz Alonso	Men's 90kg	Clarke (AUS); L 0000-1000	did not advance				
Alexis Miclin Gonzalez	Men's 73kg	Bye	Wang (CHN); L 0010–1000	—	Atnabaev (RUS); L 0000-1000	did not advance	
Rafael Torres Pompa	Men's +100kg	Bye	Zakiyev (AZE); L 0001S-1001S	—	Osewald (GER); W 0210-0000	—	Akaev (RUS); W 1000-0000 (bronze)

Sergio Arturo Perez won a gold medal in the men's 60kg category however he was tested positive for a banned substance in which he was stripped of his gold medal.

=== Powerlifting ===
==== Men ====
Athlete	Event	Result	Rank
Danilo Rodriguez Garcia	56kg	155.0	4
Cesar Rubio Guerra	52kg	130.0	9

=== Table tennis ===
==== Men ====
Athlete	Event	Preliminaries				Quarterfinals	Semifinals	Final / BM	
Athlete	Event	Opposition Result	Opposition Result	Opposition Result	Rank	Opposition Result	Opposition Result	Opposition Result	Rank
Isbel Trujillo Yero	Men's singles 1	Lee (KOR); L 0–3	Nikelis (GER); L 0–3	Kaiser (HUN); L 2–3	4	did not advance			

==== Women ====
Athlete	Event	Preliminaries				Quarterfinals	Semifinals	Final / BM	
Athlete	Event	Opposition Result	Opposition Result	Opposition Result	Rank	Opposition Result	Opposition Result	Opposition Result	Rank
Mora Yanelis Silva	Women's singles 3	Mariage (FRA); L 1–3	Fukuzawa (JPN); L 1–3	Paardekam (NED); L 1–3	4	did not advance			

== See also ==
- Cuba at the Paralympics
- Cuba at the 2004 Summer Olympics
