= Judo at the 2004 Summer Paralympics – Men's 81 kg =

Judo competition

Judo - Men's up to 81 kg at the XII Paralympic Games
- Paralympic Judo
- Venue: Ano Liossia Olympic Hall
- Dates: 19 September 2004
- Competitors: 12 from 12 nations

Medalists
1st place, gold medalist(s)		Cyril Jonard	France
2nd place, silver medalist(s)		Yuji Kato	Japan
3rd place, bronze medalist(s)		Sebastian Junk	Germany
3rd place, bronze medalist(s)		Gabor Vincze	Hungary

The Men's up to 81 kg judo competition at the 2004 Summer Paralympics was held on 19 September at the Ano Liossia Olympic Hall.

The tournament bracket consisted of a single-elimination contest culminating in a gold medal match. There was also a repechage to determine the winners of the two bronze medals. Each judoka who had lost to a semifinalist competed in the repechage. The two judokas who lost in the semifinals faced the winner of the opposite half of the bracket's repechage in bronze medal bouts.

The event was won by Cyril Jonard, representing France.

== Results ==
The four digits represent scores of ippon, waza-ari, yuko and koka (which was still used at the time). A letter indicates a penalty of shido, chui, keikoku or hansoku make, which (at the time) also registered a score of koka, yuko, waza-ari or ippon, respectively, to the opponent. Penalties are escalated, thus 2 shido = chui, 3 shido = keikoku, 4 shido = hansoku make, save that a penalty of hansoku make direct results in exclusion from the remainder of the competition, while if it results from escalation it does not.

=== Competition bracket ===
Round of 16
Ye Er Lan (CHN)	0001
Sebastian Junk (GER)	0010
Diego Poli (ITA)	0000
Gabor Vincze (HUN)	0210
Bill Morgan (CAN)	0000
Anatoly Vlasov (RUS)	1000
Cyril Jonard (FRA)	1000
Tony White (IRL)	0000

Quarterfinals
Yuji Kato (JPN)	1010
Sebastian Junk (GER)	0000
Oleksandr Pominov (UKR)	0000
Gabor Vincze (HUN)	1000
Anatoly Vlasov (RUS)	0001
Salvador Gonzalez (ESP)	0000S
Marlon Lopez (USA)	0000
Cyril Jonard (FRA)	1010

Semifinals
Yuji Kato (JPN)	0010
Gabor Vincze (HUN)	0001
Anatoly Vlasov (RUS)	0000
Cyril Jonard (FRA)	0200

Final
Yuji Kato (JPN)	0000
Cyril Jonard (FRA)	1000

=== Repechage ===
First round
Diego Poli (ITA)	0000
Oleksandr Pominov (UKR)	1010
Bill Morgan (CAN)	1000
Salvador Gonzalez (ESP)	0000
Tony White (IRL)	0000
Marlon Lopez (USA)	1000

Second round
Sebastian Junk (GER)	1000
Oleksandr Pominov (UKR)	0001
Bill Morgan (CAN)	1000
Marlon Lopez (USA)	0010

Bronze medal matches
Sebastian Junk (GER)	1000
Anatoly Vlasov (RUS)	0000
Bill Morgan (CAN)	0100
Gabor Vincze (HUN)	1000
