= Judo at the 2000 Summer Paralympics – Men's 73 kg =

Paralympic judo event

Men's 73kg at the XI Paralympic Games
- Venue: Sydney, Australia
- Competitors: 12 from 12 nations

Medalists
1st place, gold medalist(s)		Stephen Moore	United States
2nd place, silver medalist(s)		Cui Baoji	China
3rd place, bronze medalist(s)		Gerald Rollo	France
3rd place, bronze medalist(s)		Pier Morten	Canada

The men's 73 kg judo event at the 2000 Summer Paralympics.

== Main round ==
Round of 16
Ravkhat Atnabaev (RUS)	0000S
Michael Doyle (IRL)	1001
Matteo Ardit (ITA)	0000S
Pier Morten (CAN)	1001
Ratu Tevita Susu (FIJ)	0120
Andres Santana (ESP)	1100
Cui Baoji (CHN)	1000
Manop Takhiankham (THA)	0000

Quarterfinals
Michael Doyle (IRL)	0001
Gerald Rollo (FRA)	1010S
Pier Morten (CAN)	0000
Stephen Moore (USA)	0200
Andres Santana (ESP)	1001S
Michael Esser (GER)	0001S
Cui Baoji (CHN)	1000
Kostyantyn Kalugaryanu (UKR)	0000

Semifinals
Gerald Rollo (FRA)	0000S
Stephen Moore (USA)	0031
Andres Santana (ESP)	0010
Cui Baoji (CHN)	1000

Final
Stephen Moore (USA)	1020S
Cui Baoji (CHN)	0001C

== Repechage ==
First round
Ratu Tevita Susu (FIJ)	0000C
Michael Esser (GER)	1010
Manop Takhiankham (THA)	1000
Kostyantyen Kalugaryanu (UKR)	0001

Second round
Michael Doyle (IRL)	0000
Pier Morten (CAN)	0000 G
Michael Esser (GER)	0231
Manop Takhiankham (THA)	0010

Bronze medal matches
Pier Morten (CAN)	0210C
Andres Santana (ESP)	0010K
Michael Esser (GER)	0001S
Gerald Rollo (FRA)	0031S
