= Judo at the Summer Paralympics =

- Governing body: IBSA
- Events: 13 (men: 7; women: 6)

Games
- 1960; 1964; 1968; 1972; 1976; 1980; 1984; 1988; 1992; 1996; 2000; 2004; 2008; 2012; 2016; 2020; 2024
- Medalists

Paralympic judo has been contested at the Summer Paralympic Games since 1988. The sport is restricted to visually impaired competitors. Men's and women's events are held in various weight classes, just like judo at the Summer Olympics. More than 130 visually impaired judokas, including some from the United States, Canada, France, Germany, Greece, Spain and Sweden, competed in the Rio 2016 games, making it the biggest yet staged.

== Summary ==
Games	Year	Events	Best Nation	Ref
1				
2				
3				
4				
5				
6				
7				
8	1988	6	Japan	
9	1992	7	Japan	
10	1996	7	Japan	
11	2000	7	United States	
12	2004	13	Germany	
13	2008	13	China	
14	2012	13	Ukraine	
15	2016	13	Uzbekistan	
16	2020	13	Azerbaijan	
17	2024	16	Brazil	

== Medal table ==
Updated to 2024 Summer Paralympics:

Rank	Nation	Gold	Silver	Bronze	Total
1	Japan (JPN)	13	11	15	39
2	China (CHN)	11	11	8	30
3	Azerbaijan (AZE)	11	3	6	20
4	Brazil (BRA)	9	11	13	33
5	Ukraine (UKR)	7	4	14	25
6	Uzbekistan (UZB)	6	5	10	21
7	Cuba (CUB)	6	1	7	14
8	Algeria (ALG)	5	0	6	11
9	Spain (ESP)	4	9	8	21
10	France (FRA)	4	8	14	26
11	Germany (GER)	4	4	9	17
11	Great Britain (GBR)	4	4	9	17
13	South Korea (KOR)	4	2	8	14
14	Mexico (MEX)	3	1	3	7
15	United States (USA)	2	8	14	24
16	Russia (RUS)	2	5	16	23
17	Iran (IRI)	2	2	1	5
18	Austria (AUT)	2	0	0	2
19	Georgia (GEO)	1	5	1	7
20	Kazakhstan (KAZ)	1	4	3	8
21	Turkey (TUR)	1	1	8	10
22	Chinese Taipei (TPE)	1	1	2	4
23	Venezuela (VEN)	1	0	4	5
24	Romania (ROU)	1	0	2	3
25	Australia (AUS)	1	0	0	1
26	Argentina (ARG)	0	2	4	6
27	Canada (CAN)	0	1	4	5
27	Italy (ITA)	0	1	4	5
29	Moldova (MDA)	0	1	1	2
29	Unified Team (EUN)	0	1	1	2
31	Hungary (HUN)	0	0	5	5
31	Lithuania (LTU)	0	0	5	5
33	RPC (RPC)	0	0	3	3
34	Finland (FIN)	0	0	2	2
34	Sweden (SWE)	0	0	2	2
36	Greece (GRE)	0	0	1	1
36	India (IND)	0	0	1	1
36	Mongolia (MGL)	0	0	1	1
36	Netherlands (NED)	0	0	1	1
36	Portugal (POR)	0	0	1	1
Totals (40 entries)		106	106	217	429

== Nations ==
Nation	60	64	68	72	76	80	84	88	92	96	00	04	08	12	16	20	Total
Algeria (ALG)										2		2	5	3	3		5
Argentina (ARG)										1		2	2	3	5		5
Australia (AUS)									1	1	1	2	1				5
Austria (AUT)										1	1						2
Azerbaijan (AZE)												1	7	7	7		4
Belarus (BLR)														2	2		2
Brazil (BRA)								5	4	5	5	7	8	9	12		8
Bulgaria (BUL)														1			1
Burkina Faso (BUR)									1								1
Canada (CAN)								2	1	1	2	1	1	3	2		8
China (CHN)											3	10	8	8	5		5
Chinese Taipei (TPE)									2	2	1	2		1	2		6
Colombia (COL)													1	1			2
Croatia (CRO)															1		1
Cuba (CUB)									1		2	4	7	5	5		6
Fiji (FIJ)											1						1
Finland (FIN)												1	2	2			3
France (FRA)								3	3	7	7	9	9	7	2		8
Georgia (GEO)															1		1
Germany (GER)									4	6	7	9	5	5	5		7
Great Britain (GBR)								6	5	4	4	4	4	5	5		8
Greece (GRE)											1	4	2		1		4
Hong Kong (HKG)												1					1
Hungary (HUN)											2	3	3	2	2		5
Iran (IRI)												4	5	6	3		4
Iraq (IRQ)															1		1
Ireland (IRL)									2	2	3	2					4
Italy (ITA)								5	5	2	3	1	1				6
Japan (JPN)								6	7	7	5	7	9	8	9		9
Kazakhstan (KAZ)															2		1
Latvia (LAT)													1				1
Libya (LBA)											3						1
Lithuania (LTU)										1	2	1	1		1		5
Malaysia (MAS)												2					1
Mexico (MEX)													2	3	2		3
Mongolia (MGL)													1	2	2		3
Netherlands (NED)													1				1
Portugal (POR)															1		1
Puerto Rico (PUR)															1		1
Romania (ROU)															1		1
Russia (RUS)										7	6	13	11	10			5
South Korea (KOR)								5	2	3	3	2	1	3	6		8
Spain (ESP)									4	7	7	9	10	6	4		7
Sweden (SWE)								1					2	1	1		4
Thailand (THA)											3	1	1	1	1		5
Turkey (TUR)													1	6	4		3
Ukraine (UKR)											5	5	7	7	9		5
Unified Team (EUN)									4								1
United States (USA)								4	6	5	6	6	5	6	5		8
Uruguay (URU)												2	1		1		3
Uzbekistan (UZB)														1	11		2
Venezuela (VEN)												1	3	1	4		4
Vietnam (VIE)													1				1
Nations								9	16	19	24	30	34	30	36		
Competitors								33	52	67	83	118	129	128	129		
Year	60	64	68	72	76	80	84	88	92	96	00	04	08	12	16	20	

== See also ==
- Judo at the Summer Olympics
