= José Carlos Ruiz (judoka) =

Spanish Paralympic judoka (born 1971)

Personal information
- Full name: José Carlos Ruiz González
- Born: 4 November 1971 (age 54) Santa Cruz de Tenerife, Spain

Sport
- Country: Spain
- Sport: Para judo
Medal record
Para judo
Representing Spain
Paralympic Games
Bronze medal – third place	2000 Sydney	Men's -60kg
European Championships
Silver medal – second place	2001 Ufa	Men's -66kg

José Carlos Ruiz González (born 4 November 1971) is a Spanish retired Paralympic judoka who competed at international judo competitions. He is a Paralympic bronze medalist and a European silver medalist.
