= Judo at the 2004 Summer Paralympics – Women's 52 kg =

Judo - Women's up to 52 kg at the XII Paralympic Games
- Paralympic Judo
- Venue: Ano Liossia Olympic Hall
- Dates: 18 September 2004
- Competitors: 6 from 6 nations

Medalists
1st place, gold medalist(s)		Susann Schützel	Germany
2nd place, silver medalist(s)		Sandrine Aurières	France
3rd place, bronze medalist(s)		Wang Qiu Lian	China
3rd place, bronze medalist(s)		Alexandra Vlasova	Russia

The Women's up to 52 kg judo competition at the 2004 Summer Paralympics was held on 18 September at the Ano Liossia Olympic Hall.

The tournament bracket consisted of a single-elimination contest culminating in a gold medal match. There was also a repechage to determine the winners of the two bronze medals. As there were only 6 contestants in total the repechage consisted of just the two bronze medal bouts.

The event was won by Susann Schuetzel, representing Germany.

== Results ==
The four digits represent scores of ippon, waza-ari, yuko and koka (which was still used at the time). A letter indicates a penalty of shido, chui, keikoku or hansoku make, which (at the time) also registered a score of koka, yuko, waza-ari or ippon, respectively, to the opponent. Penalties are escalated, thus 2 shido = chui, 3 shido = keikoku, 4 shido = hansoku make, save that a penalty of hansoku make direct results in exclusion from the remainder of the competition, while if it results from escalation it does not.

=== Competition bracket ===
Quarterfinals
Wang Qiu Lian (CHN)	0000
Sandrine Aurières (FRA)	1100
Desiree Allan (AUS)	0000
Susann Schützel (GER)	1000

Semifinals
Alexandra Vlasova (RUS)	0000
Sandrine Aurières (FRA)	1010
Susann Schützel (GER)	1000
Tatiane da Silva (BRA)	0000

Finals
Sandrine Aurières (FRA)	0000
Susann Schützel (GER)	1021

=== Repechage ===
Bronze medal matches
Wang Qiu Lian (CHN)	1000
Tatiane da Silva (BRA)	0000
Desiree Allan (AUS)	0000
Alexandra Vlasova (RUS)	1000
