= Brett Lewis (judoka) =

American Paralympic judoka (born 1966)

Personal information
- Born: August 2, 1966 (age 59) Del Rio, Texas, U.S.
- Home town: Spokane, Washington, U.S.
- Education: Stanford University
- Occupation: Judoka

Sport
- Country: United States
- Sport: Para judo
Medal record
Para judo
Representing United States
Paralympic Games
Silver medal – second place	1992 Barcelona	Men's −78kg
Silver medal – second place	2000 Sydney	Men's −90kg

Profile at external databases
- JudoInside.com: 89800

Brett Lewis (born August 2, 1966) is an American retired Paralympic judoka who competed at international judo competitions. He is a two-time Paralympic silver medalist.

Lewis lost his eyesight due to a post-surgical infection when he was six years old, despite his disability he was an active child who took part in judo and wrestling. He studied maths and engineering at Stanford University and graduated with bachelor's degree, he now works as a software engineer.
