= Sébastien Le Meaux =

French Paralympic judoka

Personal information
- Born: 11 March 1976 (age 50) Guingamp, France

Sport
- Country: France
- Sport: Paralympic judo
- Disability: Stargardt's disease
Medal record
Paralympic judo
Representing France
Paralympic Games
Silver medal – second place	2000 Sydney	Men's -81kg
Bronze medal – third place	2004 Athens	Men's -100kg
European Championships
Gold medal – first place	2005 Vlaardingen	Men's -100kg
Bronze medal – third place	1999 Linz	Men's -81kg

Sébastien Le Meaux (born 11 March 1976) is a retired French Paralympic judoka who competed at international judo competitions. He is a European champion and a two-time Paralympic medalist.

Le Meaux was diagnosed with Stargardt's disease when he was seventeen following a motorcycle accident; he was left with 5% visual acuity.
