= Judo at the 2008 Summer Paralympics =

Judo competition

Judo Judo at the XIII Paralympic Games
- Paralympic Judo
- Venue: Beijing Workers' Gymnasium
- Location: China
- Dates: 7–9 September 2008

Competition at external databases
- Links: JudoInside

The Para Judo competition of the 2008 Summer Paralympics was held in Beijing Workers' Gymnasium from September 7 to September 9. There were 13 events, corresponding to seven weight classes for men and six for women. At the Paralympics, judo is contested by visually impaired athletes.

== Events ==
These were the 13 judo events, followed by the date they were contested.

Q	Elimination & Quarterfinal	F	Repechage, Semifinal, Bronze medal & Gold medal

Event↓/Date →	Wen 7		Thu 8		Fri 9	
Men's
Men's 60 kg	Q	F				
Men's 66 kg	Q	F				
Men's 73 kg			Q	F		
Men's 81 kg			Q	F		
Men's 90 kg					Q	F
Men's 100 kg					Q	F
Men's +100 kg					Q	F
Women's
Women's 48 kg	Q	F				
Women's 52 kg	Q	F				
Women's 57 kg			Q	F		
Women's 63 kg			Q	F		
Women's 70 kg					Q	F
Women's +70 kg					Q	F

== Competitors ==
There were 129 judoka (82 male, 47 female) taking part.

- Algeria (5)
- Argentina (2)
- Australia (1)
- Azerbaijan (7)
- Brazil (8)
- Canada (1)
- China (8)
- Colombia (1)
- Cuba (7)
- Finland (2)
- France (9)
- Germany (5)
- Great Britain (4)
- Greece (2)
- Hungary (3)
- Iran (5)
- Italy (1)
- Japan (9)
- Latvia (1)
- Lithuania (1)
- Mexico (2)
- Mongolia (1)
- Netherlands (1)
- Russia (11)
- South Korea (1)
- Spain (10)
- Sweden (2)
- Thailand (1)
- Turkey (1)
- Ukraine (7)
- United States (5)
- Uruguay (1)
- Venezuela (3)
- Vietnam (1)

== Medal summary ==
=== Medal table ===
This ranking sorts countries by the number of gold medals earned by their judoka (in this context a country is an entity represented by a National Paralympic Committee). The number of silver medals is taken into consideration next and then the number of bronze medals. If, after the above, countries are still tied, equal ranking is given and they are listed alphabetically.

Rank	Nation	Gold	Silver	Bronze	Total
1	China (CHN)	4	2	1	7
2	Algeria (ALG)	2	0	1	3
3	Brazil (BRA)	1	2	2	5
4	Azerbaijan (AZE)	1	2	1	4
5	Spain (ESP)	1	1	1	3
6	Mexico (MEX)	1	1	0	2
7	Russia (RUS)	1	0	5	6
8	Cuba (CUB)	1	0	2	3
9	Venezuela (VEN)	1	0	1	2
10	France (FRA)	0	2	3	5
11	Germany (GER)	0	1	1	2
12	Iran (IRI)	0	1	0	1
12	Japan (JPN)	0	1	0	1
14	Argentina (ARG)	0	0	2	2
14	Ukraine (UKR)	0	0	2	2
16	Finland (FIN)	0	0	1	1
16	Great Britain (GBR)	0	0	1	1
16	Netherlands (NED)	0	0	1	1
16	United States (USA)	0	0	1	1
Totals (19 entries)		13	13	26	52

=== Men's events ===
Event	Gold	Silver	Bronze
Extra-lightweight (60 kg)	Mouloud Noura; Algeria	Saeid Rahmati; Iran	Ramin Ibrahimov; Azerbaijan
Extra-lightweight (60 kg)	Mouloud Noura; Algeria	Saeid Rahmati; Iran	Li Xiaodong; China
Half-lightweight (66 kg)	Sidali Lamri; Algeria	Satoshi Fujimoto; Japan	Jani Kallunki; Finland
Half-lightweight (66 kg)	Sidali Lamri; Algeria	Satoshi Fujimoto; Japan	Victor Sanchez; Cuba
Lightweight (73 kg)	Eduardo Ávila Sánchez; Mexico	Xu Zhilin; China	Fabian Ramirez; Argentina
Lightweight (73 kg)	Eduardo Ávila Sánchez; Mexico	Xu Zhilin; China	Sergii Sydorenko; Ukraine
Half-middleweight (81 kg)	Isao Cruz Alonso; Cuba	Cyril Jonard; France	Jorge Lencina; Argentina
Half-middleweight (81 kg)	Isao Cruz Alonso; Cuba	Cyril Jonard; France	Reinaldo Carvallo; Venezuela
Middleweight (90 kg)	Oleg Kretsul; Russia	Tofig Mammadov; Azerbaijan	Olivier Cugnon de Sévricourt; France
Middleweight (90 kg)	Oleg Kretsul; Russia	Tofig Mammadov; Azerbaijan	Samuel Ingram; Great Britain
Half-heavyweight (100 kg)	Antonio Tenorio Silva; Brazil	Karim Sardarov; Azerbaijan	Juan Carlos Cortada; Cuba
Half-heavyweight (100 kg)	Antonio Tenorio Silva; Brazil	Karim Sardarov; Azerbaijan	Mykola Lyivytskyi; Ukraine
Heavyweight (+100 kg)	Ilham Zakiyev; Azerbaijan	Wang Song; China	Julien Taurines; France
Heavyweight (+100 kg)	Ilham Zakiyev; Azerbaijan	Wang Song; China	Greg DeWall; United States

=== Women's events ===
Event	Gold	Silver	Bronze
48 kg	Guo Huaping; China	Karla Cardoso; Brazil	Victoria Potapova; Russia
48 kg	Guo Huaping; China	Karla Cardoso; Brazil	Carmen Brussig; Germany
52 kg	Cui Na; China	Sandrine Aurières-Martinet; France	Alesya Stepanyuk; Russia
52 kg	Cui Na; China	Sandrine Aurières-Martinet; France	Michelle Ferreira; Brazil
57 kg	Wang Lijing; China	Ramona Brussig; Germany	Daniele Silva; Brazil
57 kg	Wang Lijing; China	Ramona Brussig; Germany	Maria Monica Merenciano; Spain
63 kg	Naomi Soazo; Venezuela	Marta Arce; Spain	Angelique Quessandier; France
63 kg	Naomi Soazo; Venezuela	Marta Arce; Spain	Madina Kazakova; Russia
70 kg	Carmen Herrera; Spain	Lenia Ruvalcaba; Mexico	Tatiana Savostyanova; Russia
70 kg	Carmen Herrera; Spain	Lenia Ruvalcaba; Mexico	Sanneke Vermeulen; Netherlands
+70 kg	Yuan Yanping; China	Deanne Silva; Brazil	Irina Kalyanova; Russia
+70 kg	Yuan Yanping; China	Deanne Silva; Brazil	Zoubida Bouazoug; Algeria

== See also ==
- Judo at the 2008 Summer Olympics
