= Mieko Kato =

Japanese goalball player

Personal information
- Born: Mieko Asai (浅井 三重子, Asai Mieko); October 1, 1980 (age 45) Tokyo, Japan
- Spouse: Yuji Kato

Sport
- Sport: Women's goalball
- Disability class: B3
Medal record
Representing Japan
Paralympic Games
Bronze medal – third place	2004 Athens	Team

Mieko Kato (加藤 三重子, Katō Mieko; née Asai (浅井), born 1 October 1980) is a Japanese retired goalball player. She won a bronze medal at the 2004 Summer Paralympics.

She has a congenital retinal disease which caused tunnel vision. Her corrected vision is 20/200, and it wasn't until junior high school that she became aware of her disability.

== Personal life ==
She is married to Paralympic judoka Yuji Kato. The couple lived in Asaka, Saitama.
