= Lee Ching-chung =

Taiwanese judoka

Sport
- Country: Chinese Taipei
- Sport: Para judo
Medal record
Para judo
Representing Chinese Taipei
Paralympic Games
Gold medal – first place	1996 Atlanta	Men's -60kg
Bronze medal – third place	2000 Sydney	Men's -60kg

Lee Ching-chung (Chinese: 李青忠) is a Taiwanese judoka. He completed in the 60 kg men's judo events at the 1996, 2000, and 2004 Summer Paralympics. Lee medaled twice, winning gold in 1996 and bronze in 2000.
