= Juan Damián Matos =

Spanish Paralympic judoka

Personal information
- Full name: Juan Damián Matos Rodríguez
- Born: 4 April 1963 (age 63) Valladolid, Spain

Sport
- Country: Spain
- Sport: Paralympic judo
Medal record
Paralympic judo
Representing Spain
Paralympic Games
Gold medal – first place	1992 Barcelona	Men's -65kg

Juan Damián Matos Rodríguez (born 4 April 1963) is a retired Spanish Paralympic judoka. He won a gold medal at the 1992 Summer Paralympics.
