= Judo at the 1996 Summer Paralympics =

Judo competition

Judo Judo at the X Paralympic Games
- Paralympic Judo
- Location: United States
- Dates: 16 to 19 August
- Competitors: 67 from 19 nations

Competition at external databases
- Links: JudoInside

Paralympic symbol (1994-2004)

Para Judo at the 1996 Summer Paralympics consisted of seven men's events.

== Medal table ==
Rank	Nation	Gold	Silver	Bronze	Total
1	Japan (JPN)	2	1	1	4
2	Great Britain (GBR)	1	0	2	3
3	Australia (AUS)	1	0	0	1
3	Austria (AUT)	1	0	0	1
3	Brazil (BRA)	1	0	0	1
3	Chinese Taipei (TPE)	1	0	0	1
7	United States (USA)	0	1	3	4
8	France (FRA)	0	1	2	3
9	China (CHN)	0	1	1	2
9	Russia (RUS)	0	1	1	2
9	Spain (ESP)	0	1	1	2
12	Argentina (ARG)	0	1	0	1
13	South Korea (KOR)	0	0	2	2
14	Lithuania (LTU)	0	0	1	1
Totals (14 entries)		7	7	14	28

=== Participating nations ===
- Algeria (2)
- Argentina (1)
- Australia (1)
- Austria (1)
- Brazil (5)
- Canada (1)
- China (3)
- Chinese Taipei (2)
- France (7)
- Germany (6)
- Great Britain (4)
- Ireland (2)
- Italy (2)
- Japan (7)
- Lithuania (1)
- Russia (7)
- South Korea (3)
- Spain (7)
- United States (5)

== Medal summary ==
Event	Gold	Silver	Bronze
Men's 60 kg	Lee Ching Chung; Chinese Taipei	Nobuhiro Kanki; Japan	Kim Il Keun; South Korea
Men's 60 kg	Lee Ching Chung; Chinese Taipei	Nobuhiro Kanki; Japan	Veniamin Mitchourine; Russia
Men's 65 kg	Satoshi Fujimoto; Japan	Akhmed Gazemagomedov; Russia	Marlon Lopez; United States
Men's 65 kg	Satoshi Fujimoto; Japan	Akhmed Gazemagomedov; Russia	Cyril Morel; France
Men's 71 kg	Takio Ushikubo; Japan	Gérald Rollo; France	Stephen Moore; United States
Men's 71 kg	Takio Ushikubo; Japan	Gérald Rollo; France	Cui Baoji; China
Men's 78 kg	Simon Jackson; Great Britain	Fabián Ramírez; Argentina	Eugenio Santana; Spain
Men's 78 kg	Simon Jackson; Great Britain	Fabián Ramírez; Argentina	Jonas Stoškus; Lithuania
Men's 86 kg	Antônio Tenório; Brazil	Francisco Boedo; Spain	An Yu Sung; South Korea
Men's 86 kg	Antônio Tenório; Brazil	Francisco Boedo; Spain	Ian Rose; Great Britain
Men's 95 kg	Anthony Clarke; Australia	Run Ming Men; China	James Mastro; United States
Men's 95 kg	Anthony Clarke; Australia	Run Ming Men; China	Terence Powell; Great Britain
Men's +95 kg	Walter Hanl; Austria	Kevin Szott; United States	Osamu Takagaki; Japan
Men's +95 kg	Walter Hanl; Austria	Kevin Szott; United States	Eric Censier; France

== See also ==
- Judo at the 1996 Summer Olympics
