= Lin Der-chang =

Taiwanese judoka

Sport
- Country: Chinese Taipei
- Sport: Paralympic judo
Medal record
Paralympic judo
Representing Chinese Taipei
Paralympic Games
Bronze medal – third place	1992 Barcelona	Men's -86kg

Lin Der-chang (Chinese: 林德昌) is a Taiwanese judoka. He completed in the 86 kg men's judo event at the 1992 Summer Paralympics, where he earned a bronze medal.
