= Susann Schützel =

German Paralympic judoka

Personal information
- Born: 21 May 1978 (age 48) Frankfurt Oder
- Home town: Frankfurt, Germany

Sport
- Country: Germany
- Sport: Paralympic judo
Medal record
Paralympic judo
Representing Germany
Paralympic Games
Gold medal – first place	2004 Athens	Women's -52kg
IBSA European Judo Championships
Silver medal – second place	2005 Vlaardingen	Women's -52kg

Susann Schützel (born 21 May 1978) is a blind retired German Paralympic judoka who competed in international level events. She was a judo champion at the 2004 Summer Paralympics in Athens.
