= Judo at the 2012 Summer Paralympics =

Judo Judo at the XIV Paralympic Games
- Venue: ExCeL London
- Location: United Kingdom
- Dates: 30 August – 1 September 2012
- Competitors: 128 from 30 nations
- Website: Official website

Competition at external databases
- Links: JudoInside

The Para Judo competition of the 2012 Summer Paralympics was held in ExCeL London from 30 August to 1 September. There were 13 events, corresponded to seven weight classes for men and six for women. At the Paralympics, judo was contested by visually impaired athletes.

== Participating nations ==
128 judokas from 30 nations competed.

- Algeria (3)
- Argentina (3)
- Azerbaijan (7)
- Belarus (2)
- Brazil (9)
- Bulgaria (1)
- Canada (3)
- China (8)
- Chinese Taipei (1)
- Colombia (1)
- Cuba (5)
- Finland (2)
- France (7)
- Germany (5)
- Great Britain (5)
- Hungary (2)
- Iran (6)
- Japan (8)
- Mexico (3)
- Mongolia (2)
- Russia (10)
- South Korea (3)
- Spain (6)
- Sweden (1)
- Thailand (1)
- Turkey (6)
- Ukraine (7)
- United States (6)
- Uzbekistan (1)
- Venezuela (4)

== Medal summary ==
=== Medal table ===
Rank	Nation	Gold	Silver	Bronze	Total
1	Ukraine (UKR)	3	0	2	5
2	Cuba (CUB)	2	0	2	4
3	Azerbaijan (AZE)	2	0	1	3
3	Germany (GER)	2	0	1	3
5	China (CHN)	1	5	1	7
6	Spain (ESP)	1	0	2	3
7	Japan (JPN)	1	0	0	1
7	South Korea (KOR)	1	0	0	1
9	Russia (RUS)	0	1	4	5
10	Brazil (BRA)	0	1	3	4
11	Argentina (ARG)	0	1	1	2
11	Great Britain (GBR)	0	1	1	2
11	Turkey (TUR)	0	1	1	2
11	United States (USA)	0	1	1	2
15	Chinese Taipei (TPE)	0	1	0	1
15	Uzbekistan (UZB)	0	1	0	1
17	Algeria (ALG)	0	0	3	3
18	Hungary (HUN)	0	0	1	1
18	Mexico (MEX)	0	0	1	1
18	Venezuela (VEN)	0	0	1	1
Totals (20 entries)		13	13	26	52

== Medals ==
=== Men's events ===
Event	Gold	Silver	Bronze
60 kg	Ramin Ibrahimov; Azerbaijan	Li Xiaodong; China	Mouloud Noura; Algeria
60 kg	Ramin Ibrahimov; Azerbaijan	Li Xiaodong; China	Ben Quilter; Great Britain
66 kg	Davyd Khorava; Ukraine	Zhao Xu; China	Sid Ali Lamri; Algeria
66 kg	Davyd Khorava; Ukraine	Zhao Xu; China	Marcos Falcón; Venezuela
73 kg	Dmytro Solovey; Ukraine	Sharif Khalilov; Uzbekistan	Shakhban Kurbanov; Russia
73 kg	Dmytro Solovey; Ukraine	Sharif Khalilov; Uzbekistan	Eduardo Ávila Sánchez; Mexico
81 kg	Olexandr Kosinov; Ukraine	José Effron; Argentina	Isao Cruz Alonso; Cuba
81 kg	Olexandr Kosinov; Ukraine	José Effron; Argentina	Matthias Krieger; Germany
90 kg	Jorge Hierrezuelo Marcillis; Cuba	Sam Ingram; Great Britain	Jorge Lencina; Argentina
90 kg	Jorge Hierrezuelo Marcillis; Cuba	Sam Ingram; Great Britain	Dartanyon Crockett; United States
100 kg	Choi Gwang-geun; South Korea	Myles Porter; United States	Antônio Tenório Silva; Brazil
100 kg	Choi Gwang-geun; South Korea	Myles Porter; United States	Vladimir Fedin; Russia
+100 kg	Kento Masaki; Japan	Song Wang; China	Yangaliny Jiménez Domínguez; Cuba
+100 kg	Kento Masaki; Japan	Song Wang; China	Ilham Zakiyev; Azerbaijan

=== Women's events ===
Event	Gold	Silver	Bronze
48 kg	Carmen Brussig; Germany	Lee Kai-Lin; Chinese Taipei	Victoria Potapova; Russia
48 kg	Carmen Brussig; Germany	Lee Kai-Lin; Chinese Taipei	Yuliya Halinska; Ukraine
52 kg	Ramona Brussig; Germany	Wang Lijing; China	Nataliya Nikolaychyk; Ukraine
52 kg	Ramona Brussig; Germany	Wang Lijing; China	Michele Ferreira; Brazil
57 kg	Afag Sultanova; Azerbaijan	Lúcia da Silva Teixeira; Brazil	Monica Merenciano Herrero; Spain
57 kg	Afag Sultanova; Azerbaijan	Lúcia da Silva Teixeira; Brazil	Duygu Çete; Turkey
63 kg	Dalidaivis Rodriguez Clark; Cuba	Zhou Tong; China	Daniele Bernardes Milan; Brazil
63 kg	Dalidaivis Rodriguez Clark; Cuba	Zhou Tong; China	Marta Arce Payno; Spain
70 kg	Carmen Herrera; Spain	Tatiana Savostyanova; Russia	Zhou Qian; China
70 kg	Carmen Herrera; Spain	Tatiana Savostyanova; Russia	Nikolett Szabó; Hungary
+70 kg	Yuan Yanping; China	Nazan Akın; Turkey	Zoubida Bouazoug; Algeria
+70 kg	Yuan Yanping; China	Nazan Akın; Turkey	Irina Kalyanova; Russia

== See also ==
- Judo at the 2012 Summer Olympics
