= Daniele Bernardes =

Brazilian Paralympic judoka (born 1984)

Personal information
- Full name: Daniele Bernardes Milan Da Silva
- Born: 6 August 1984 (age 41) São Bernardo do Campo, Brazil
- Occupation: Judoka
- Height: 1.73 m (5 ft 8 in)
- Weight: 63 kg (139 lb)

Sport
- Country: Brazil
- Sport: Para judo
Medal record
Para judo
Representing Brazil
Paralympic Games
Bronze medal – third place	2004 Athens	-57kg
Bronze medal – third place	2008 Beijing	-57kg
Bronze medal – third place	2012 London	-63kg
IBSA World Games
Gold medal – first place	2011 Antalya	-63kg
World Championships
Bronze medal – third place	2010 Antalya	-63kg
Parapan American Games
Gold medal – first place	2007 Rio de Janeiro	-63kg
Silver medal – second place	2011 Guadalajara	-63kg

Profile at external databases
- JudoInside.com: 89726

Daniele Bernardes Milan Da Silva (born 6 August 1984) is a former Brazilian Paralympic judoka who competed in international level events.
