= Mario Talavera (judoka) =

Spanish Paralympic judoka

Personal information
- Full name: Mario Tomas Talavera Rodríguez
- Born: 18 October 1972 (age 53) Province of Las Palmas, Spain

Sport
- Country: Spain
- Sport: Paralympic judo
Medal record
Paralympic judo
Representing Spain
Paralympic Games
Silver medal – second place	1992 Barcelona	Men's -71kg

Mario Tomas Talavera Rodríguez (born 18 October 1972) is a retired Spanish Paralympic judoka. He won a silver medal at the 1992 Summer Paralympics.
