= Satoshi Fujimoto =

Japanese Paralympic judoka

Personal information
- Born: 2 August 1975 (age 50) Tokushima, Japan
- Occupation: Judoka

Sport
- Country: Japan
- Sport: Paralympic judo
Medal record
Paralympic judo
Representing Japan
Paralympic Games
Gold medal – first place	1996 Atlanta	Men's -65kg
Gold medal – first place	2000 Sydney	Men's -66kg
Gold medal – first place	2004 Athens	Men's -66kg
Silver medal – second place	2008 Beijing	Men's -66kg
Bronze medal – third place	2016 Rio de Janeiro	Men's -66kg
IBSA World Games
Bronze medal – third place	2011 Antalya	Men's -66kg

Profile at external databases
- JudoInside.com: 89753

Satoshi Fujimoto (born 2 August 1975) is a Japanese Paralympic judoka who competes in international level events. He is regarded as one of the most successful Paralympic judoka.

Fujimoto is visually impaired in his left eye due to an accident aged five years old.
