= Judo at the 1992 Summer Paralympics =

Judo competition

Judo Judo at the Paralympic Games
- Paralympic Judo
- Location: Spain
- Dates: 4 to 6 September

Competition at external databases
- Links: JudoInside

Paralympic symbol (1988-1994)

Para Judo at the 1992 Summer Paralympics consisted of seven events for men.

== Medal summary ==
Event	Gold	Silver	Bronze
Men's 60 kg	Nobuhiro Kanki; Japan	Veniamin Mitchourine; Unified Team	Davide Albertini; Italy
Men's 60 kg	Nobuhiro Kanki; Japan	Veniamin Mitchourine; Unified Team	Woon Noh Cheung; South Korea
Men's 65 kg	Juan Damián Matos; Spain	Shinichi Ishizue; Japan	Akhmed Gazimagomedov; Unified Team
Men's 65 kg	Juan Damián Matos; Spain	Shinichi Ishizue; Japan	Michael Murch; Great Britain
Men's 71 kg	Simon Jackson; Great Britain	Mario Talavera; Spain	Pier Morten; Canada
Men's 71 kg	Simon Jackson; Great Britain	Mario Talavera; Spain	Eiji Miyauchi; Japan
Men's 78 kg	Joel Gichtenaere; France	Brett Lewis; United States	Takio Ushikubo; Japan
Men's 78 kg	Joel Gichtenaere; France	Brett Lewis; United States	Matteo Ardit; Italy
Men's 86 kg	Yu Sung An; South Korea	Yasuhiro Uwano; Japan	Lin Der-chang; Chinese Taipei
Men's 86 kg	Yu Sung An; South Korea	Yasuhiro Uwano; Japan	Daniel Fourcade; France
Men's 95 kg	Osamu Takagaki; Japan	Lynn Manning; United States	Mikhail Yakovlev; Unified Team
Men's 95 kg	Osamu Takagaki; Japan	Lynn Manning; United States	Klaus Heyer; Germany
Men's +95 kg	Masakazu Saito; Japan	None	James Mastro; United States
Men's +95 kg	Masakazu Saito; Japan	None	Franz Gatscher; Italy

=== Medal table ===
Rank	Nation	Gold	Silver	Bronze	Total
1	Japan (JPN)	3	2	2	7
2	Spain (ESP)	1	1	0	2
3	France (FRA)	1	0	1	2
3	Great Britain (GBR)	1	0	1	2
3	South Korea (KOR)	1	0	1	2
6	Unified Team (EUN)	0	2	2	4
7	United States (USA)	0	2	1	3
8	Italy (ITA)	0	0	3	3
9	Canada (CAN)	0	0	1	1
9	Chinese Taipei (TPE)	0	0	1	1
9	Germany (GER)	0	0	1	1
Totals (11 entries)		7	7	14	28

== Notes ==
*: The Gold medal in the +95 weight class was originally awarded to Vladimir Kazakov of the Unified Team. After the games ended, Kazakov was found to have used illegal substances and was stripped of the medal. The Gold was then awarded to Masakazu Saito (Japan). The silver should have been awarded to James Mastro (U.S.A.) but never happened.
