= Shinichi Ishizue =

Japanese judoka

Medal record

Representing Japan

Paralympic Games

Judo
Gold medal – first place	1988 Seoul	Men's 65kg
Silver medal – second place	1992 Barcelona	Men's 65kg

Shinichi Ishizue (礎 眞一, Ishizue Shinichi) is a Japanese Paralympic judoka. In 1988, the debut for judo in the Paralympics, he won the gold medal in men's 65 kg. He competed again in 1992, where he won a silver medal.
