= Sebastian Junk =

German Paralympic judoka

Personal information
- Born: 29 November 1983 (age 42) Trier, Germany
- Occupation: Judoka

Sport
- Country: Germany
- Sport: Paralympic judo
Medal record
Paralympic judo
Representing Germany
Paralympic Games
Bronze medal – third place	2004 Athens	Men's -90kg
European Championships
Bronze medal – third place	2011 Crawley	Men's -73kg

Profile at external databases
- JudoInside.com: 89773

Sebastian Junk (born 29 November 1983) is a German Paralympic judoka who competes in international level events. He has participated at five Paralympic Games and won a bronze medal at the 2004 Summer Paralympics.
