= Gábor Vincze (judoka) =

Hungarian Paralympic judoka

Personal information
- Born: 29 February 1976 (age 50)
- Home town: Budapest, Hungary
- Occupation: Judoka

Sport
- Country: Hungary
- Sport: Para judo
- Disability: Macular degeneration
Medal record
Para judo
Representing Hungary
Paralympic Games
Bronze medal – third place	2000 Sydney	Men's -81kg
Bronze medal – third place	2004 Athens	Men's -81kg
World Championships
Bronze medal – third place	2006 Brommat	Men's -81kg
European Championships
Silver medal – second place	2005 Vlaardingen	Men's -81kg
Bronze medal – third place	2013 Eger	Men's -81kg

Profile at external databases
- JudoInside.com: 89882

Gábor Vincze (born 29 February 1976) is a former Hungarian para judoka. He is a two-time Paralympic bronze medalist, one-time World bronze medalist and two-time European medalist.

Vincze became partially blind when he was four years old after drinking a large amount of wine which caused him to have alcohol poisoning.
