= Marlon Lopez =

American Paralympic judoka

Personal information
- Born: 13 December 1975 (age 50) Guatemala

Sport
- Country: United States
- Sport: Paralympic judo
- Disability: Visual impairment
Medal record
Paralympic judo
Representing United States
Paralympic Games
Bronze medal – third place	1996 Atlanta	Men's -65kg
Bronze medal – third place	2000 Sydney	Men's -66kg
World Championships
Bronze medal – third place	1998 Madrid	Men's -65kg

Marlon Lopez (born December 13, 1975) is a retired American Paralympic judoka who competed at international level events. He competed at three Paralympic Games winning two bronze medals.

Lopez contracted Stevens–Johnson syndrome when he was nine years old after having a severe allergic reaction to medication leading to him being partially sighted.
