= Veniamin Mitchourine =

Russian judoka

Personal information
- Full name: Veniamin Nikolaevich Michurin
- Nationality: Unified Team/Russia
- Born: 7 April 1965 (age 61) Krasnousolsky, Bashkir Autonomous Soviet Socialist Republic, Soviet Union
Medal record
Paralympic Games
Judo
Representing Unified Team
Silver medal – second place	1992 Barcelona	Men's 60kg
Representing Russia
Bronze medal – third place	1996 Atlanta	Men's 60kg
Silver medal – second place	2000 Sydney	Men's 60kg

Veniamin Mitchourine (born 7 April 1965 in Krasnousolsky, USSR) is a Russian Paralympic judoka.

In 1992, representing the Unified Team, he won the silver medal in 60kg. In 1996, representing Russia, he won the bronze in the same event. In 2000, he won another silver medal.
