= Judo at the 1988 Summer Paralympics =

Judo competition

Judo Judo at the 1988 Summer
- Paralympic Judo
- Venue: Sangmu National Sports Center
- Location: South Korea
- Dates: 16 to 19 October

Competition at external databases
- Links: JudoInside

Paralympic symbol (1988–1994)

Para Judo at the 1988 Summer Paralympics consisted of six events for men.

== Medal table ==
Rank	Nation	Gold	Silver	Bronze	Total
1	Japan (JPN)	4	2	0	6
2	Great Britain (GBR)	1	1	3	5
3	South Korea (KOR)	1	1	0	2
4	France (FRA)	0	1	1	2
5	Italy (ITA)	0	1	0	1
6	Brazil (BRA)	0	0	3	3
7	Canada (CAN)	0	0	2	2
7	United States (USA)	0	0	2	2
9	Sweden (SWE)	0	0	1	1
Totals (9 entries)		6	6	12	24

== Medal summary ==
Event	Gold	Silver	Bronze
Men's 60 kg	Simon Jackson; Great Britain	Mokoto Shinkawa; Japan	Jaime De Oliveira; Brazil
Men's 60 kg	Simon Jackson; Great Britain	Mokoto Shinkawa; Japan	John Allen; United States
Men's 65 kg	Shinichi Ishizue; Japan	Rene Duchemin; France	Júlio Silva; Brazil
Men's 65 kg	Shinichi Ishizue; Japan	Rene Duchemin; France	Pier Morten; Canada
Men's 71 kg	Yu Sung An; South Korea	Norio Kato (judoka); Japan	Paul Lewis; Great Britain
Men's 71 kg	Yu Sung An; South Korea	Norio Kato (judoka); Japan	Eddie Morten; Canada
Men's 78 kg	Takio Ushikubo; Japan	Do Sang Yu; South Korea	Terence Powell; Great Britain
Men's 78 kg	Takio Ushikubo; Japan	Do Sang Yu; South Korea	David McKinley; United States
Men's 86 kg	Yasuhiro Uwano; Japan	David Hurst; Great Britain	Kenneth Henningsson; Sweden
Men's 86 kg	Yasuhiro Uwano; Japan	David Hurst; Great Britain	Daniel Fourcade; France
Men's +95 kg	Masakazu Saito; Japan	Walter Monti; Italy	Leonel Cunha Moraes Filho; Brazil
Men's +95 kg	Masakazu Saito; Japan	Walter Monti; Italy	David Hodgkins; Great Britain
