= María del Carmen Herrera Gómez =

Spanish paralympic athlete

Carmen Herrera
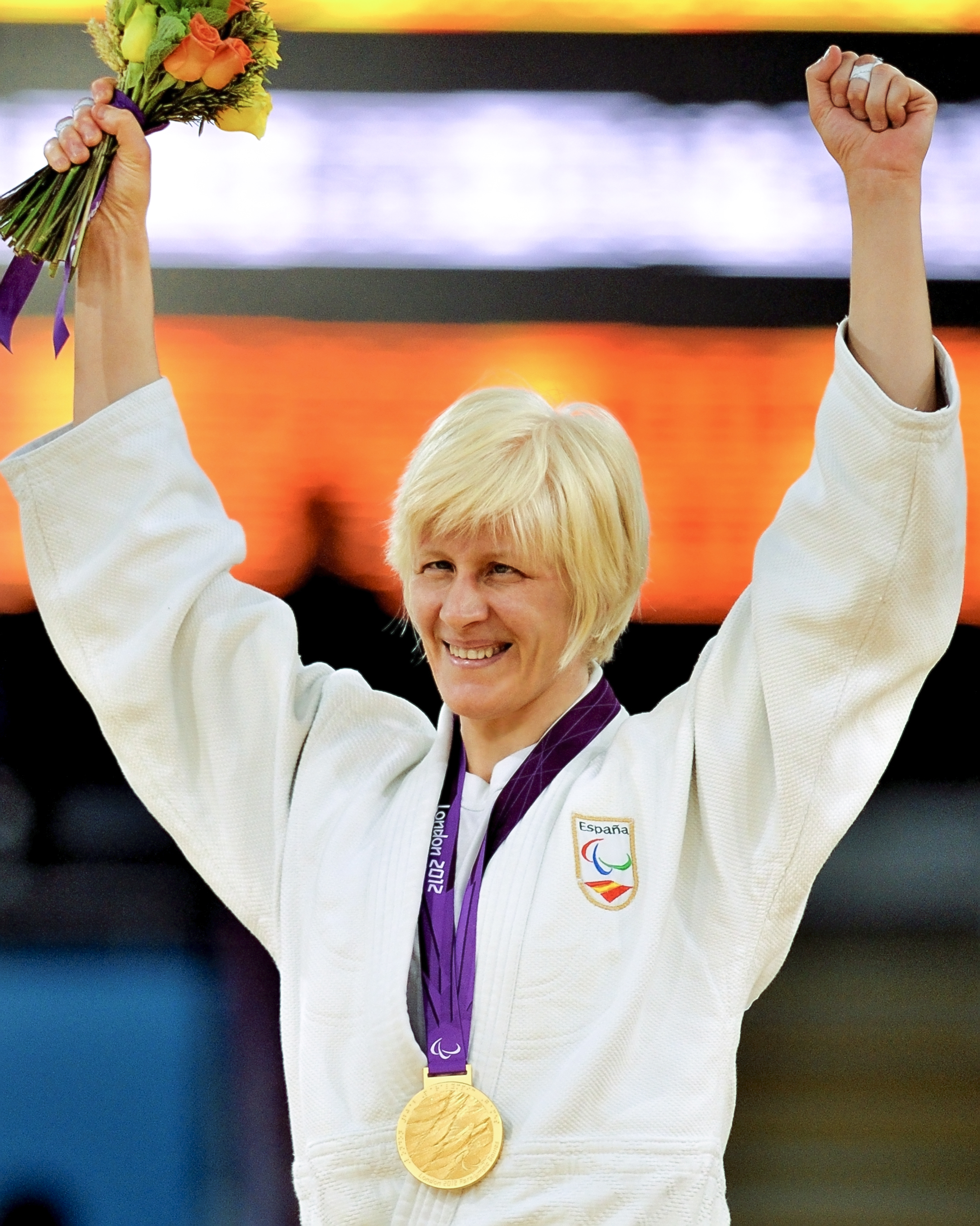
- Carmen Herrera in London (2012)

Personal information
- Full name: María del Carmen Herrera Gómez
- Nationality: Spanish
- Born: 26 September 1974 (age 51) Málaga, Spain
- Occupation: Judoka

Sport
- Country: Spain
- Sport: Judo (B3)
Medal record
Women's judo
Representing Spain
Paralympic Games
Gold medal – first place	Athens 2004	-70 kg
Gold medal – first place	Beijing 2008	-70 kg
Gold medal – first place	London 2012	-70 kg
World Games
Gold medal – first place	Sao Paulo 2007	-70 kg
Gold medal – first place	Antalya 2011	-70 kg
Bronze medal – third place	Madrid 1998	-70 kg
European Championships
Gold medal – first place	Mittersill 1999	-70 kg
Gold medal – first place	Ufa 2001	-70 kg
Gold medal – first place	Vlaardingen 2005	-70 kg
Bronze medal – third place	Baku 2007	-70 kg
Bronze medal – third place	Debrecen 2009	-70 kg

Profile at external databases
- JudoInside.com: 46466

María del Carmen Herrera Gomez (born 26 September 1974 in Málaga), commonly known as Carmen Herrera, is a judo athlete from Spain.

== Personal ==
Herrera has visual impairment and is a B3 classified sportsperson. In December 2013, she attended an event marking Spanish insurance company Santa Lucía Seguros becoming a sponsor of the Spanish Paralympic Committee, and consequently Plan ADOP which funds high performance Spanish disability sport competitors. She chose to attend the event because she wanted to show support for this type of sponsorship.

== Judo ==
She competed in judo at the 2004 Summer Paralympics, 2008 Summer Paralympics and 2012 Summer Paralympics. She was won a gold in the Up to 70 kg women's group at the 2004, 2008 and 2012 Games. In 2013, she was working to qualify for the 2016 Summer Paralympics, although she couldn't qualify.

In October 2011, she competed in a regional Spanish national vision impaired judo event in Guadalajara. In November 2013, she competed in the Open Judo Tournament Guadalajara in the women's less than 70 kilos group.

She is one of the two female paralympic judokas to win three gold medals in para judo.
