= Gérald Rollo =

French Paralympic judoka

Personal information
- Born: 11 March 1968 (age 58) Lorient, France
- Occupation: Judoka

Sport
- Country: France
- Sport: Para judo
- Disability: Leber's disease
Medal record
Para judo
Representing France
Paralympic Games
Silver medal – second place	1996 Atlanta	Men's -71kg
Bronze medal – third place	2000 Sydney	Men's -73kg

Profile at external databases
- IJF: 48344
- JudoInside.com: 89850

Gérald Rollo (born 11 March 1968) is a retired French para judoka who competed at international judo competitions. He participated at five Paralympic Games and won two Paralympic medals during his sporting career.
