= Cyril Jonard =

French judoka (born 1976)

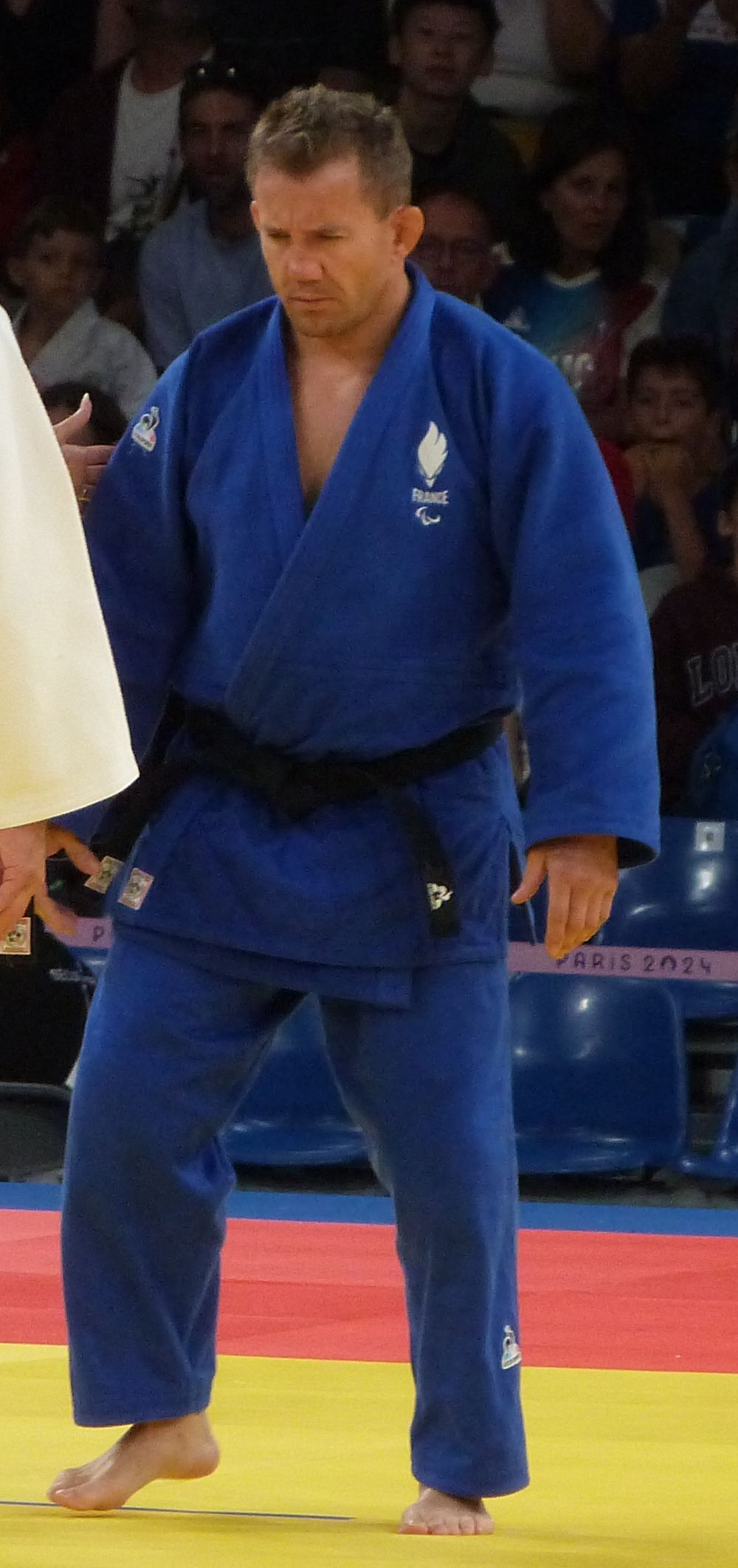

Personal information
- Born: 3 February 1976 (age 50) Eymoutiers, France
- Occupation: Judoka

Sport
- Country: France
- Sport: Para judo
Medal record
Men's para judo
Representing France
Paralympic Games
Gold medal – first place	2004 Athens	-81 kg
Silver medal – second place	2008 Beijing	-81 kg
Bronze medal – third place	2024 Paris	-90 kg J1

Profile at external databases
- JudoInside.com: 89772

Cyril Jonard (born 23 February 1976) is a French judoka. He competes in judo events for the visually impaired and blind. Jonard has Usher syndrome; he is both deaf and visually impaired. He competes against non-deaf judoka.

Jonard took part in the 2004 Summer Paralympics in Athens. He won gold in the men's half-middleweight category (-81 kg) when he defeated Japan's Yuji Kato by ippon within just a few seconds in the final.

He was subsequently awarded a knighthood in the Légion d'honneur, the highest decoration in France, by French President Jacques Chirac. He also received a personal letter of congratulations from President Chirac for his achievement.

Jonard represented France again at the 2008 Summer Paralympics in Beijing, and won silver in the under 81 kg category, defeated in the final by Cuba's Isao Cruz.
