= Ana Jiménez =

Cuban Paralympic athlete

Medal record

Paralympic athletics

Representing Cuba

Paralympic Games
Gold medal – first place	2004 Athens	Long Jump - F13
Bronze medal – third place	2004 Athens	100 metres - T13

Ana Ibis Jiménez is a Paralympian athlete from Cuba competing mainly in category F13 long jump events.

Ana competed in the 100m at the 2004 Summer Paralympics winning a bronze medal. She went bettered this in the same games winning the gold medal in the F13 long jump.
