= Stephen Moore (judoka) =

American Paralympic judoka

Personal information
- Nationality: American
- Born: 10 November 1969 (age 56) Baton Rouge, Louisiana, United States

Sport
- Country: United States
- Sport: Paralympic judo
- Disability: Albinism
- Coached by: Willy Cahill
- Retired: 2007
Medal record
Paralympic judo
Representing United States
Paralympic Games
Gold medal – first place	2000 Sydney	Men's -73kg
Bronze medal – third place	1996 Atlanta	Men's -71kg
Bronze medal – third place	2004 Athens	Men's -73kg
World Championships
Bronze medal – third place	1995 Colorado Springs	Men's -86kg
Gold medal – first place	1998 Madrid	Men's -73kg
Bronze medal – third place	2002 Roam	Men's -73kg

Stephen "Scott" Moore (born November 10, 1969) is a retired American Paralympic judoka who competed in international level events. He was the first American judoka to win a gold medal in either Olympic or Paralympic judo at the 2000 Summer Paralympics.

He is now a judo coach in Denver who teaches Paralympic judoka at elite level, he was the head coach for the American judo team at the 2012, 2016 Summer Paralympics, and 2020 Summer Paralympics. His wife, Heidi Moore, is also a judoka and was a participant at the Judo World Championships twice and a Pan American bronze medalist.
