= Yunieski Abreu =

Cuban Paralympic athlete (born 1981)

Personal information
- Born: 1 September 1981 (age 45)

Sport
- Sport: Paralympic athletics
- Disability class: T13
Medal record
Representing Cuba
Paralympic Games
| Bronze medal – third place | 2004 Athens | 5000 m T13 |
Parapan American Games
| Bronze medal – third place | 2007 Rio de Janeiro | 1500m T13 |

Yunieski Abreu (born 1 September 1981) is a paralympic athlete from Cuba competing mainly in category T13 middle and long-distance events.

Yunieski competed in the 800m, 1500m and 5000m in the 2004 Summer Paralympics winning a bronze medal in the 5000m. Unfortunately he could not follow this in Beijing in the 2008 Summer Paralympics where competing in only the 1500m he failed to make the final.
