= Raul Fernández Arrizabalaga =

Spanish cyclist and judo athlete

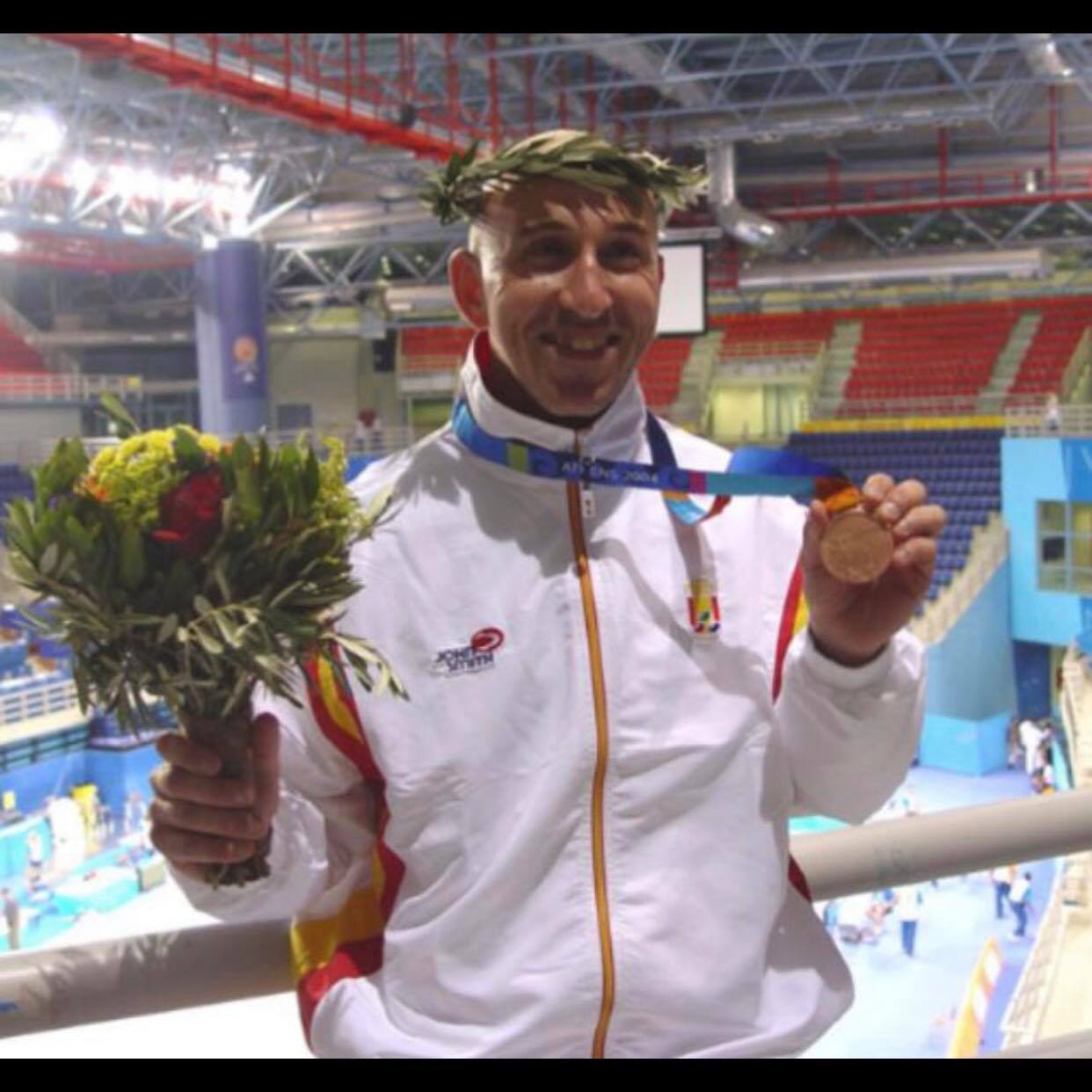
- Raul Fernández Arrizabalaga in 2004

Personal information
- Nationality: Spanish

Sport
- Country: Spain
- Sport: Cycling
Medal record
Men's cycling
Representing Spain
Paralympic Games

Raul Fernandez Arrizabalaga (born 13 January 1972 in Luarca) is a cyclist and judo athlete from Spain. He is blind and is a B2 type athlete. He competed at the 1996 Summer Paralympics in cycling. He competed at the 2004 Summer Paralympics in judo. He finished third in the Up to 90 kg Open group.
