= Simon Jackson (judoka) =

British judoka

Simon Jackson MBE
Personal information
- Born: 28 May 1972 (age 54)

Sport
- Country: United Kingdom
- Sport: Paralympic Judo
Medal record
Paralympic Games
Gold medal – first place	1988 Seoul	Men's Up To 60 kg
Gold medal – first place	1992 Barcelona	Men's Up To 71 kg
Gold medal – first place	1996 Atlanta	Men's Up To 78 kg
Bronze medal – third place	2000 Sydney	Men's Up To 81 kg
Paralympic World Cup
Gold medal – first place	2009	Tandem Sprint
Gold medal – first place	2009	Tandem Kilometre Time Trial
Silver medal – second place	2008	Tandem Sprint
Silver medal – second place	2008	Tandem Kilometre Time Trial

Simon Jackson MBE (born 28 May 1972) is a visually impaired judoka and cyclist from Britain. He has competed in five Paralympic Games winning gold medals in three consecutive Games. In addition to his Paralympic success he also won three world titles and 16 European gold medals. He switched to tandem cycling and won two events in 2009.

== Sporting career ==
Jackson won gold medals at the 1988, 1992, and 1996 Summer Paralympics and bronze at the 2000 Games in his judo weight class. His loss to Cuban Isao Rafael Cruz Alonso ended a winning streak that had lasted 162 bouts. At the 2004 Games he lost in the first round against Sergiy Sydorenko, staging a sit-down protest against the referee's decision to award Sydorenko a match-winning yuko. Jackson claims that he was off the mat and that the points should not have been awarded. After the match the referee watched a video recording of the incident and confirmed the decision. Jackson remains Britain's most successful judo competitor.

In 2008 Jackson was forced to retire from judo competition after suffering a back injury. He began to focus on tandem cycling and partnered Barney Storey. He just missed out on selection for the 2008 Paralympic Games in Beijing but the pair went on to win gold at two events at the 2009 BT Paralympic World Cup.

Jackson was a member of the Channel 4 commentary team for the London 2012 Paralympic Games, covering judo alongside Neil Adams. Based on his experiences of disability sport he is also a motivational speaker.

== Personal life ==
Jackson was born on 28 May 1972. He was appointed Member of the Order of the British Empire (MBE) for services to judo for disabled people in the 1997 New Year Honours.
