= Noralvis de Las Heras =

Cuban Paralympic athlete

Medal record

Paralympic athletics

Representing Cuba

Paralympic Games
Bronze medal – third place	2004 Athens	Shot Put - F42/46

Noralvis de las Heras is a Paralympian athlete from Cuba competing mainly in category F42-46 throwing events.

Noralvis competed in the 2004 Summer Paralympics in Athens winning a bronze medal in the F42-46 shot put and finishing outside the medals in the discus and javelin.
