= Diosmani González =

Cuban Paralympic athlete

Personal information
- Born: 1973 (age 52–53) Camagüey, Cuba

Sport
- Sport: Paralympic athletics
- Disability class: T12
Medal record
Representing Cuba
Paralympic Games
Gold medal – first place	1996 Atlanta	10,000m T12
Silver medal – second place	1996 Atlanta	5000m T12
Silver medal – second place	2004 Athens	10,000m T13
Parapan American Games
Bronze medal – third place	2007 Rio de Janeiro	5000m T12

Diosmani González Santana (born 1973) is a paralympic athlete from Cuba competing mainly in category T12 long-distance events.

Diosmani competed in the 1996 Summer Paralympics, winning gold in the T12 10000m and silver in the 5000m, as well as competing in the Marathon. After missing the 2000 games, he returned in the 2004 Summer Paralympics to compete in the 1500m and 5000m, and won the silver medal in the 10000m.
