= Isao Cruz Alonso =

Cuban Paralympic judoka (born 1982)

Personal information
- Full name: Isao Rafael Cruz Alonso
- Born: 5 August 1982 (age 43) Villa Clara Province, Cuba
- Occupation: Judoka

Sport
- Country: Cuba
- Sport: Paralympic judo
- Disability: Astigmatism and hyperopia
Medal record
Paralympic judo
Representing Cuba
Paralympic Games
| Gold medal – first place | 2000 Sydney | Men's -81kg |
| Gold medal – first place | 2008 Beijing | Men's -81kg |
| Bronze medal – third place | 2012 London | Men's -81kg |
IBSA World Judo Championships
| Silver medal – second place | 2006 Brommat | Men's -81kg |
Parapan American Games
| Silver medal – second place | 2011 Guadalajara | Men's -81kg |
| Bronze medal – third place | 2007 Rio de Janeiro | Men's -81kg |
IBSA Pan Am Judo Championships
| Bronze medal – third place | 2020 Montreal | Men's -100kg |

Isao Rafael Cruz Alonso (born 5 August 1982) is a Cuban Paralympic judoka who competes in international elite events. He is a double Paralympic champion and a World silver medalist.
