= Judo rules =

Rules of Judo

This article describes the rules of judo. The main sections of the article describe the rules that apply to any situation in which judo is practiced, and those rules which apply only in judo competitions, notably in the Summer Olympics since 1964 for men and 1992 for women, the Summer Paralympics since 1988 for men and 2004 for women and also the Commonwealth Games in 1990 initially as optional sport and from 2022 onwards as core sport.

== In practice and competition ==
=== Safety ===
- Intentionally injuring an opponent is not permitted.
- Punching, kicking, and other strikes are not allowed.
- Touching the opponent's face is not allowed.
- Attacking joints other than the elbow is not allowed.
- Head dives are not permitted.
- The technique known as kawazu gake is not permitted.
- The technique known as kani basami is not permitted.
- Wearing any hard or metallic object during competition is not permitted. The penalty for violating this rule is hansoku make (see Penalties, below). This includes wedding rings, earrings, hard-plastic protective gear, hair-ties with metal parts, wristwatches, and even press-studs on underpants.
- For female judokas, hair with longer length must be tied either in a pony tail or a hair bun (neat or messy). A plain white T-shirt must be worn.
- If a player is severely bleeding the match should be stopped

=== Etiquette ===
- Contestants must bow before stepping onto the mat.
- Contestants must bow to each other before and after practice or competition.
- Inappropriate behaviour, such as foul language and bodily gestures, is not tolerated.

== In competition only ==
- Stalling is not permitted.
- Using a defensive posture is not permitted.
- It is required to bow to the competition area.
- False attacks are not permitted. They are considered attempts to circumvent the prohibition against noncombativity.
- Disregarding the orders of the judge is prohibited.

=== Scoring ===
The scoring rules in use starting in 2017 are as follows:

- Awarding of ippon (一本) 'One full point'. Award of ippon decides the winner and ends the match. Ippon is awarded for a successful throw performed with control and power, or for a pin lasting 20 seconds. Submission by strangulation or application of an arm lock at the elbow joint also results in ippon.
- Awarding of waza-ari (技あり). 'One half point'. Awarded for a successful throw lacking one of the above elements, or for a pin lasting 10 to 19 seconds. With the exception of 2017, two waza-ari also wins the match (announced as “waza-ari awasete ippon,” or “waza-ari together [with a previously-earned waza-ari] makes ippon”).
- Awarding of yuko (有効). One score of waza-ari was considered greater than any number of yuko scores. From 2008 to 2016, yuko was the smallest score that can be awarded. Yuko was removed from IJF competition in 2017 and reinstated in 2025.

The following rules are no longer in use:

- Awarding of koka (効果). Was introduced in 1975 and removed from IJF competition at the end of 2008. Any number of koka scores does not add up to a yuko score.

=== Penalties ===
Two types of penalties may be awarded. A shido (指導; literally "guidance" or "instruction") is awarded for minor rule infringements. A shido can also be awarded for a prolonged period of non-aggression. Recent rule changes allow for the first shidos to result in only warnings. If there is a tie, the number of shidos for each player are not used to determine the winner. After three shidos are given, the victory is given to the opponent. This is an indirect hansoku-make, and does not result in expulsion from the tournament. The penalty of hansoku make (反則負け; literally "foul-play loss") is awarded for major rule infringements, or for accumulating three shidos. If hansoku make is awarded for a major rule infringement, it results not just in loss of the match, but in expulsion from the tournament. Prior to 2017, the 4th shido was hansoku make.

=== Competition area ===
The competition area must be padded with tatami. The minimum allowable size is 14 m × 14 m (46 ft × 46 ft). The match takes place in an 8 m × 8 m (26 ft × 26 ft) to 10 m × 10 m (33 ft × 33 ft) zone within this larger area. The surrounding space acts as a safety zone. When two competition areas are side by side, there must be at least a 3-meter (10-foot) safety zone between them.

=== Grips ===
Rules related to grips are primarily motivated by the desire to avoid stalling, to avoid providing undue advantage, or to reduce the chance of injury.

- Deliberately avoiding gripping is not permitted.
- In a standing position, it is not permitted to take any grip other than a "normal" grip for more than three to five seconds without attacking. A "normal" grip is one where the right hand grips some part of the left/right hand side of the opponent's jacket (and the left hand grips some part of the right hand side of the opponent's jacket, vice versa.) A non-normal grip may involve grabbing the belt, or the trousers, or the wrong side of the jacket. (A non-"standard" grip is one that does not involve the traditional sleeve/collar grip. There are no time-limits related to non-"standard" grips as long as they are not non-"normal".)
- A "pistol grip" on the opponent's sleeve is permitted if immediate attack is launched.
- It is not permitted to insert the fingers inside the opponent's sleeve opening or trousers opening at any time. You are permitted to insert your fingers inside your own gi openings.
- Biting the opponent's gi is prohibited, as it grants another gripping point.
- Since 2010, it is not permitted to grab the legs or trousers, initially, during tachi-waza (standing techniques). As of 9 February 2013 it is no longer permissible to touch the legs of the opponent whatsoever during tachi-waza. Furthermore, if two hands are used to break a grip, it is legal only if at least one hand maintains a grip on that hand/sleeve.

=== Age ===
Judo competitions typically have some safety-related rules related to age: chokes are prohibited under a certain age (typically 13), and arm bars are prohibited under a certain age (typically 16).

The duration of matches is also dependent on the age of the competitors. Match length is typically three minutes for children, five minutes for teenagers and young adults, and three minutes for 'masters' (adults thirty years of age or older).

=== Judogi ===
Rules related to the judogi are primarily related either to safety or to preventing contestants from wearing judogi that prevent their opponent from being able to get a grip on them.

- The sleeves of the jacket are not allowed to be too short: they must extend down to no more than 5 cm (2.0 in) above the wrists with the arms extended in front of the body.
- The legs of the trousers are not allowed to be too short: they must extend down to no more than 5 cm (2.0 in) above the ankle.
- Excessive advertising on the judogi must be avoided, and may result in a forced loss if an appropriate judogi cannot be found.

=== Medical treatment, illness, and injury ===
The official International Judo Federation (IJF) rules related to the provision of medical treatment and to the proper handling of situations involving illness or injury are relatively long and involved, since the exact nature and cause of an injury may itself affect the awarding of the match, and since receiving some types of medical treatment, but not others, automatically ends the match. The latter fact makes it necessary for medical attendants at judo matches to have some understanding of this rather complex aspect of the rules of judo. The medical team is not allowed to enter the fighting area without permission from the mat judge, and if a contestant receives medical treatment he automatically forfeits the match. Nosebleeds, for example cannot be treated by the medical team; the contestant must fix it him or herself with materials provided by the medical team. Proper procedure is stuffing cotton balls up the nostrils, while applying tape around the head. If a contestant is rendered unconscious without a choking technique, and is unable to wake up, the medical team has to take immediate action and they can't wait for the contestant's consent; he or she forfeits the match automatically. A contestant can ignore any injuries he or she has, and keep fighting. This requires that it is not of any discomfort to the opponent, e.g. bleeding over an opponent can cause penalties. If the bleeding has been tried to be stopped three times, with no effect, the match is forfeited.

== Sources ==
- The IJF rules are the official published reference for the rules of judo competition (see External links, below). However, rules can be changed by committee decision between official releases of the published rules, and these are not published on the IJF site.
- Mastering judo by Masao Takahashi et al., explains a number of aspects of the rules. General rules of competition, etiquette, and the penalty system are covered in Chapter 2. ISBN 0-7360-5099-X.
- The first chapter of Competitive judo: winning training and techniques, by Ron Angus, is devoted to explaining a number of aspects of the rules. ISBN 0-7360-5744-7.
