= Japan at the 1992 Summer Paralympics =

- IPC code: JPN
- NPC: Japan Paralympic Committee
- Website: www.jsad.or.jp (in Japanese)

in Barcelona
- Competitors: 76
- Medals Ranked 19th: Gold 8 Silver 7 Bronze 5 Total 20

Summer Paralympics appearances (overview)
- 1964; 1968; 1972; 1976; 1980; 1984; 1988; 1992; 1996; 2000; 2004; 2008; 2012; 2016; 2020; 2024

Japan competed at the 1992 Summer Paralympics in Barcelona, Spain. 76 competitors from Japan won 20 medals and finished 16th in the medal table.

== See also ==
- Japan at the Paralympics
- Japan at the 1992 Summer Olympics
