= Yuji Kato =

Japanese judoka

Personal information
- Born: August 23, 1978 (age 47) Ranzan, Saitama, Japan
- Education: University of Tsukuba
- Spouse: Mieko Kato

Sport
- Sport: Judo (Men's -81kg)
- Disability class: B1
Medal record
Representing Japan
Paralympic Games
Silver medal – second place	2004 Athens	-81 kg
Asian Para Games
Gold medal – first place	2010 Guangzhou	-81 kg

Yuji Kato (加藤 裕司, Katō Yūji; born 23 August 1978) is a Japanese retired judoka. He won a silver medal at the 2004 Summer Paralympics. He was coached by Takio Ushikubo.

== Personal life ==
He is married to goalball player Mieko Kato (née Asai). The couple lived in Asaka, Saitama.
