= IBSA European Judo Championships =

Judo competition

- Most recent season or competition: 2023 IBSA European Judo Championships
- Sport: Paralympic judo
- Founded: 1989
- First season: 1989
- Organising body: IBSF Judo
- Continent: Europe

The IBSA European Judo Championships is an event organized by the International Blind Sports Federation (IBSA). It is a paralympic judo competition, that is judo for visually impaired athletes. Organised biennially, the competition is not run during years when the IBSA World Judo Championships or the Summer Paralympics are contested.

== Championships ==
Edition	Year	City	Country	Date	Venue	Events	Ref.
1	1989						
2	1991						
3	1993	Paris	France				
4	1995	Valladolid	Spain				
5	1997	Citta di Castello	Italy				
6	1999	Mittersill	Austria				
7	2001	Ufa	Russia				
8	2003						
9	2005	Vlaardingen	Netherlands	2–6 April			
10	2007	Baku	Azerbaijan	17–21 May	Baku Sports Hall		
11	2009	Debrecen	Hungary	3–5 July			
12	2011	Crawley	United Kingdom	17–20 November	K2		
13	2013	Eger	Hungary	4–6 December			
14	2015	Odivelas	Portugal	25–30 November	Multiusos Sports Hall	13	
15	2017	Walsall	United Kingdom	4–6 August	Walsall Campus	13	
16	2019	Genova	Italy	26–28 July	RDS Stadium	13	
17	2022						
18	2023						
19	2024						
20	2025	Tbilisi	Georgia	18–21 September			

== Classification ==
- B1 - Athletes who are legally blind.
- B2 - Athletes who are visually impaired.
- B3 - Athletes who have partial vision.

== See also ==
- Judo at the Summer Paralympics
- IBSA World Judo Championships
