= Judo at the 2000 Summer Paralympics =

Judo competition

Judo Judo at the XI Paralympic Games
- Paralympic Judo
- Venue: Sydney Showground Pavilions
- Location: Australia
- Dates: 19 to 21 October
- Competitors: 83 from 24 nations

Competition at external databases
- Links: JudoInside

Paralympic symbol (1994-2004)

Judo at the 2000 Summer Paralympics consisted of seven men's events.

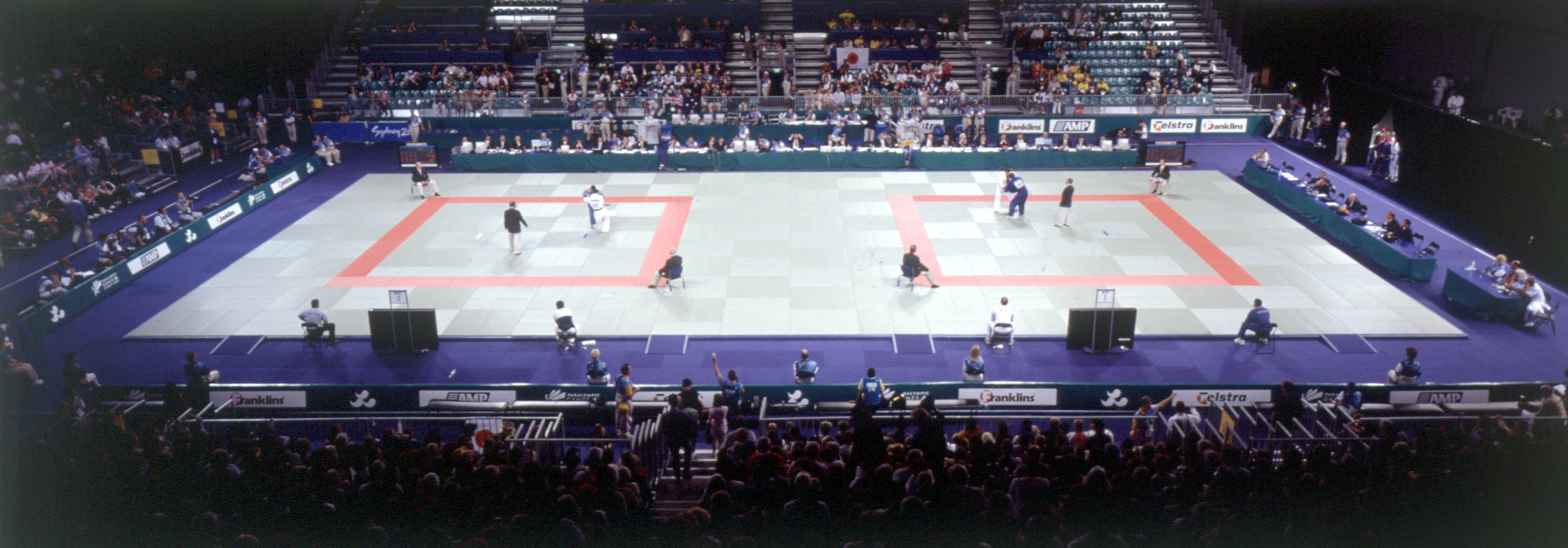
Panoramic view of the Judo venue during competition at the 2000 Summer Paralympics

== Medal table ==
Rank	Nation	Gold	Silver	Bronze	Total
1	United States (USA)	2	1	1	4
2	Cuba (CUB)	2	0	0	2
3	Japan (JPN)	1	0	2	3
4	Austria (AUT)	1	0	0	1
4	Brazil (BRA)	1	0	0	1
6	Russia (RUS)	0	2	1	3
6	Spain (ESP)	0	2	1	3
8	France (FRA)	0	1	2	3
9	China (CHN)	0	1	1	2
10	Canada (CAN)	0	0	1	1
10	Chinese Taipei (TPE)	0	0	1	1
10	Germany (GER)	0	0	1	1
10	Great Britain (GBR)	0	0	1	1
10	Hungary (HUN)	0	0	1	1
10	South Korea (KOR)	0	0	1	1
Totals (15 entries)		7	7	14	28

=== Participating nations ===
- Australia (1)
- Austria (1)
- Brazil (5)
- Canada (2)
- China (3)
- Chinese Taipei (1)
- Cuba (2)
- Fiji (1)
- France (7)
- Germany (7)
- Great Britain (4)
- Greece (1)
- Hungary (2)
- Ireland (3)
- Italy (3)
- Japan (5)
- Libya (3)
- Lithuania (2)
- Russia (6)
- South Korea (3)
- Spain (7)
- Thailand (3)
- Ukraine (5)
- United States (6)

== Medallists ==
Event	Gold	Silver	Bronze
Men's −60 kg	Sergio Arturo Perez; Cuba	Veniamin Mitchourine; Russia	José Carlos Ruiz; Spain
Men's −60 kg	Sergio Arturo Perez; Cuba	Veniamin Mitchourine; Russia	Lee Ching Chung; Chinese Taipei
Men's −66 kg	Satoshi Fujimoto; Japan	David García; Spain	Marlon Lopez; United States
Men's −66 kg	Satoshi Fujimoto; Japan	David García; Spain	Oleg Chabachov; Russia
Men's −73 kg	Stephen Moore; United States	Baoji Cui; China	Pier Morten; Canada
Men's −73 kg	Stephen Moore; United States	Baoji Cui; China	Gérald Rollo; France
Men's −81 kg	Isao Cruz Alonso; Cuba	Sébastien Le Meaux; France	Gábor Vincze; Hungary
Men's −81 kg	Isao Cruz Alonso; Cuba	Sébastien Le Meaux; France	Simon Jackson; Great Britain
Men's −90 kg	Antônio Tenório Da Silva; Brazil	Brett Lewis; United States	David Guillaume; France
Men's −90 kg	Antônio Tenório Da Silva; Brazil	Brett Lewis; United States	Yu Sung An; South Korea
Men's −100 kg	Walter Hanl; Austria	Grigori Shneyderman; Russia	Run Ming Men; China
Men's −100 kg	Walter Hanl; Austria	Grigori Shneyderman; Russia	Yoshikazu Matsumoto; Japan
Men's +100 kg	Kevin Szott; United States	Rafael Moreno; Spain	Eiji Miyauchi; Japan
Men's +100 kg	Kevin Szott; United States	Rafael Moreno; Spain	Martin Osewald; Germany
