= Antônio Tenório Silva =

Brazilian judoka (born 1970)

Personal information
- Born: 24 October 1970 São Bernardo do Campo, São Paulo
- Died: 2012 (aged 41–42)
- Occupation: Judoka

Sport
- Sport: Para judo
Medal record
Men's judo
Representing Brazil
Paralympic Games
Gold medal – first place	1996 Atlanta	–86 kg
Gold medal – first place	2000 Sydney	–90 kg
Gold medal – first place	2004 Athens	–100 kg
Gold medal – first place	2008 Beijing	–100 kg
Silver medal – second place	2016 Rio de Janeiro	–100 kg
Bronze medal – third place	2012 London	–100 kg
Parapan American Games
Silver medal – second place	2011 Guadalajara	-100kg

Antônio Tenório da Silva (born 24 October 1970) is a Brazilian judoka. As a child, he lost the vision in his left eye from an accident while playing with a slingshot. Six years later, an infection claimed the vision in his right eye, leaving him completely blind at the age of 19.

He has participated in six Summer Paralympics and has won 4 golds,1 silver and a 1 bronze. With his win at the 2008 Games, he became the first person to win four consecutive Paralympic gold medals in judo.
