= Para judo =

Judo for visually impaired

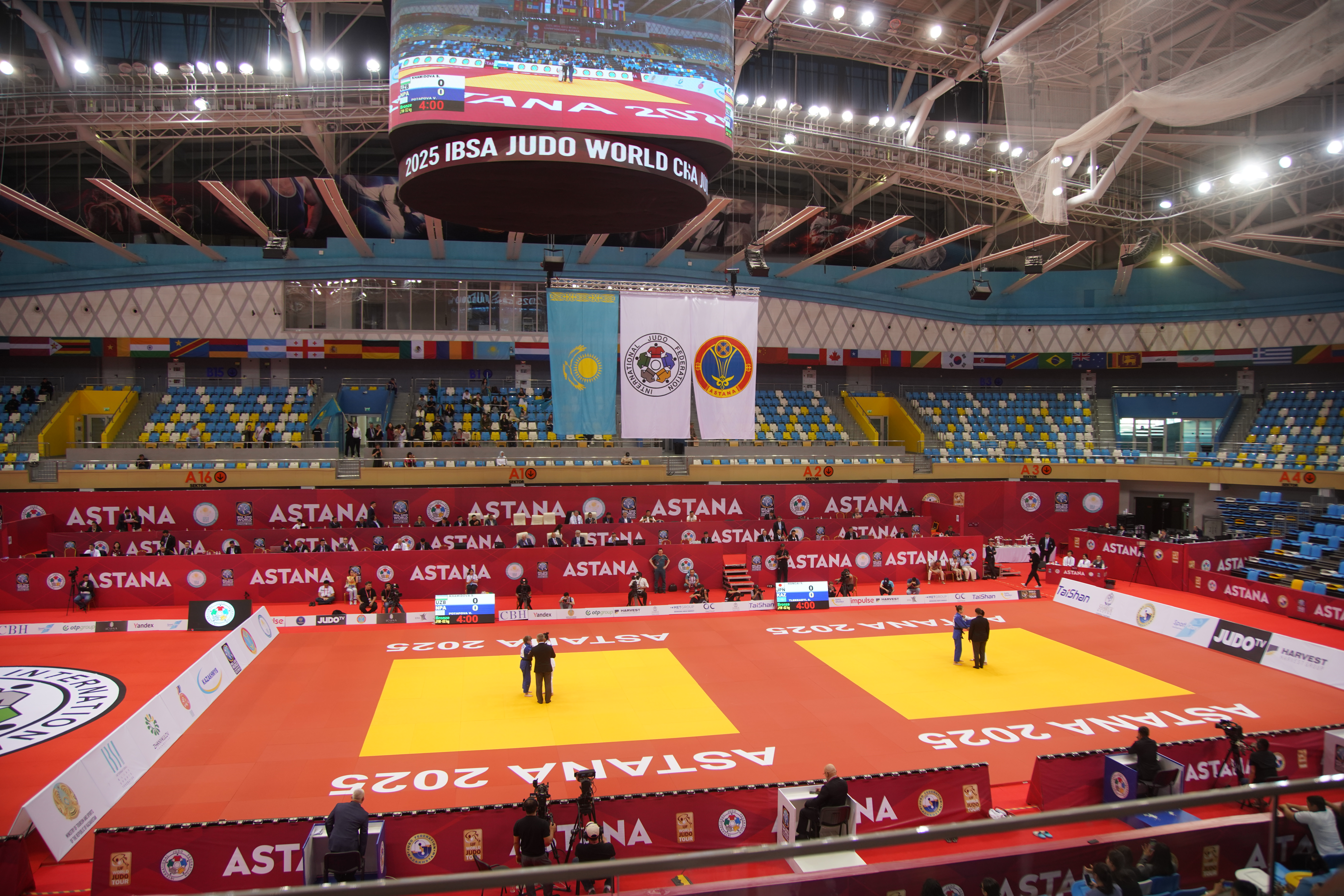
2025 IBSA Judo World Championships in Astana, Kazakhstan

Para judo is an adaptation of the Japanese martial art of judo for severe vision impaired and acute vision impaired competitor. The global governing body of the sport is IBSA (International Blind Sport Federation) and the rules of the sport are slightly different from regular judo competitions. Adaptations such as starting a fight with a grip in place and the absence of penalties for exiting the mat are included in Para judo.

== Para judo at the Paralympics ==
The sport's first appearance was during the 1950s in England, whereas other countries started to participate in the 1970s. Para judo made its debut at the Seoul 1988 Paralympic Games featuring only men competitors and is the first sport of Asian origin to be included in the Paralympics .During the 2004 Athens Paralympics, women’s events were introduced to the competition programme and France’s Karima Medjeded won the first woman’s title. The Paris 2024 Paralympic Games marked the highest number of Para Judo participants with 146 athletes across 43 countries, competing in 16 medal events.

== Rules ==
Paralympic judo competition is governed by the International Judo Federation rules with some modifications specified by the International Blind Sports Federation. The major rule difference is that contests always start with the 2 competitors in a loose grip on each other's Judo suits (grip called "Kumikata") and if contact is broken, "mate"(Wait), or stop, is called and the competitors return to center and regrip. Another adaptation is that there are no penalties for exiting the mat.

== Classification ==
Para judo is contested in two classes, where athletes compete against each other in the same gender group, weight category, and vision impairment class.

- J1 – Athletes with severe vision impairments
- J2 – Athletes with accute vision impairments
