= Judo at the 2008 Summer Paralympics – Men's +100 kg =

Judo competition

Judo - Men's +100 kg at the XIII Paralympic Games
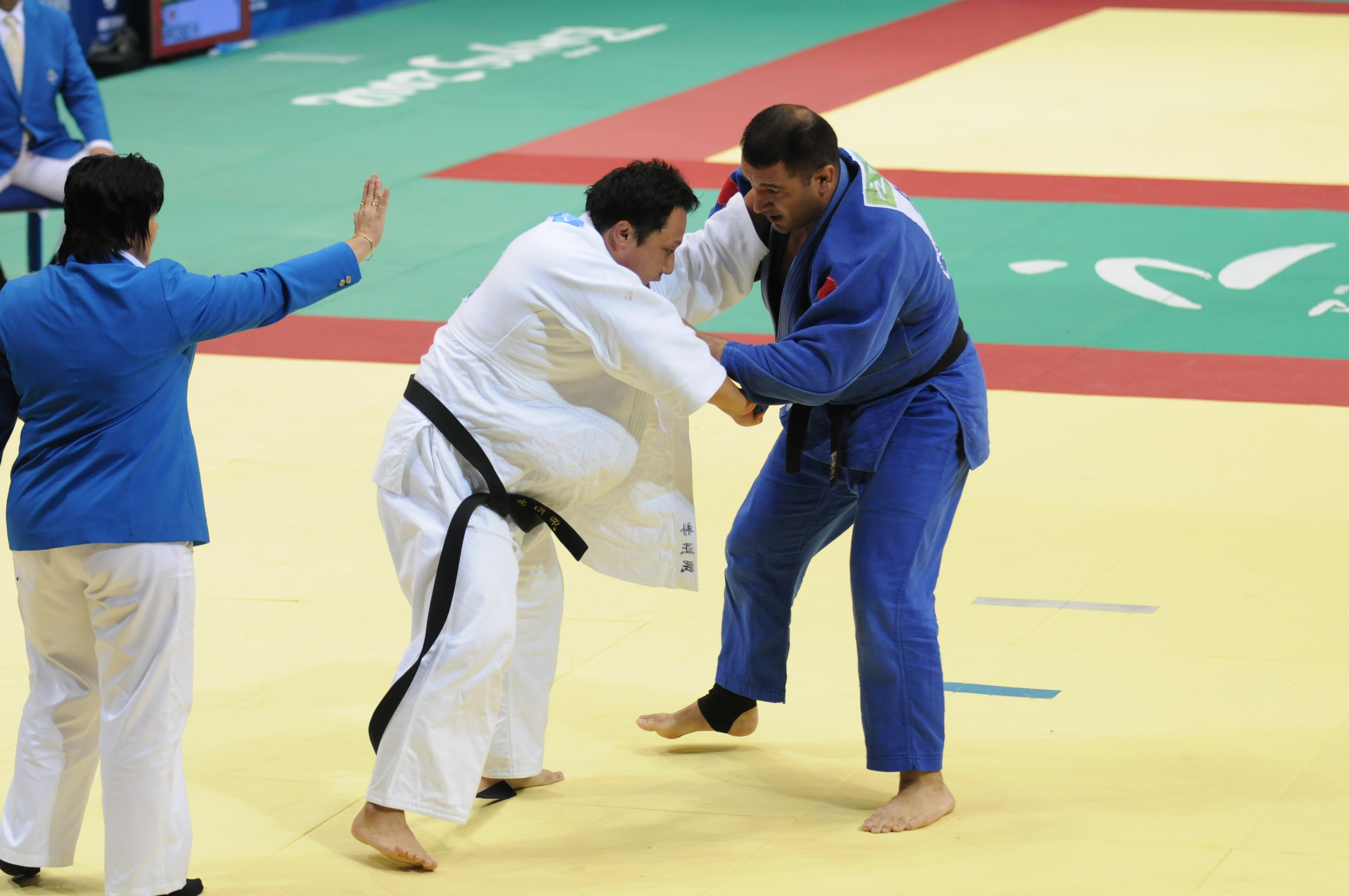
- Ilham Zakiyev (AZE) competing
- Venue: Beijing Workers' Gymnasium
- Date: 9 September 2008
- Competitors: 11 from 11 nations

Medalists
1st place, gold medalist(s)		Ilham Zakiyev	Azerbaijan
2nd place, silver medalist(s)		Wang Song	China
3rd place, bronze medalist(s)		Julien Taurines	France
3rd place, bronze medalist(s)		Greg DeWall	United States

The men's +100 kg judo competition at the 2008 Summer Paralympics was held on 9 September at the Beijing Workers' Gymnasium.

This event was the heaviest of the men's judo weight classes, allowing competitors with over 100 kilograms of body mass. Like all other judo events, bouts lasted five minutes. If the bout was still tied at the end, it was extended for another five-minute, sudden-death period; if neither judoka scored during that period, the match is decided by the judges. The tournament bracket consisted of a single-elimination contest culminating in a gold medal match. There was also a repechage to determine the winners of the two bronze medals. Each judoka who had lost to a semifinalist competed in the repechage. The two judokas who lost in the semifinals faced the winner of the opposite half of the bracket's repechage in bronze medal bouts.

A total of eleven judokas competed in the event. A twelfth competitor, Khalil Guerfa of Algeria, was disqualified for failing a pre-match medical exam. He was to have had a bye in the first round followed by a bout against the winner of the Rafael Moreno-Park Jung-min match. Because of Guerfa's disqualification, the winner of the Moreno-Park match instead received a bye into the third round.

== Final ranking ==
Rank	Name
Gold medal	Ilham Zakiyev (AZE)
Silver medal	Wang Song (CHN)
Bronze medal	Julien Taurines (FRA)
Bronze medal	Greg DeWall (USA)
5	Gabor Papp (HUN)
5	Park Jung-min (KOR)
7	Rafael Moreno (ESP)
7	Alexander Parasyuk (RUS)

== Tournament results ==
First Round
Julien Taurines (FRA)	1000
Dominik Zilian (GER)	0000
Rafael Moreno (ESP)	0000
Park Jung-min (KOR)	1100
Yargaliny Jimenez (CUB)	0000
Greg DeWall (USA)	1000
Gabor Papp (HUN)	1011
Alexander Parasyuk (RUS)	0000^{1}

Quarterfinals
Julien Taurines (FRA)	0000
Ilham Zakiyev (AZE)	1000
Park Jung-min (KOR)
Bye
Greg DeWall (USA)	0000
Wang Song (CHN)	0111
Theoklitos Papachristos (GRE)	0001^{1}
Gabor Papp (HUN)	1001^{1}

Semifinals
Ilham Zakiyev (AZE)	1000
Park Jung-min (KOR)	0001
Wang Song (CHN)	1110
Gabor Papp (HUN)	0111^{2}

Final
Ilham Zakiyev (AZE)	1000
Wang Song (CHN)	0000

=== Repechage ===
First round
Bye
Julien Taurines (FRA)
Rafael Moreno (ESP)
Bye
Bye
Greg DeWall (USA)
Alexander Parasyuk (RUS)	0001
Theoklitos Papachristos (GRE)	0000^{1}

Second round
Julien Taurines (FRA)	1000
Rafael Moreno (ESP)	0010
Greg DeWall (USA)	1000
Alexander Parasyuk (RUS)	0000

Bronze medal finals
Julien Taurines (FRA)	1000
Gabor Papp (HUN)	0000
Greg DeWall (USA)	1001
Park Jung-min (KOR)	0110^{1}
