= List of Pennsylvania State University Olympians =

The list of Pennsylvania State University Olympians is a list of former or current Penn State University students (154) and coaches and faculty members (13) (through 2026) who have appeared as athletes at the Olympic Games, plus one athlete for the boycotted 1980 Summer Olympics. The university had its most representatives participating in the 2024 Summer Olympics in Paris, with 36 participants earning fourteen medals, the most ever by Penn State athletes in a single Olympic Games.

== Appearances and medal winners by sport ==
Totals are through the 2022 Beijing Winter Olympic Games.

| Sport | Appearances^{†} | 1st place, gold medalist(s) | 2nd place, silver medalist(s) | 3rd place, bronze medalist(s) | Total^{♦} |
| Track and field | 56 | 5 | 10 | 5 | 20 |
| Gymnastics | 24 | 0 | 0 | 1 | 1 |
| Fencing | 22 | 0 | 1 | 3 | 4 |
| Volleyball | 18 | 2^{‡} | 2^{#} | 5^{¶} | 9 |
| Wrestling | 15 | 4 | 1 | 1 | 6 |
| Soccer | 11 | 1 | 0 | 3 | 4 |
| Swimming & diving | 9 | 2 | 0 | 3 | 5 |
| Basketball | 7 | 1 | 1 | 1 | 3 |
| Cycling | 7 | 0 | 0 | 0 | 0 |
| Rifle | 4 | 0 | 0 | 0 | 0 |
| Field hockey | 3 | 0 | 0 | 3^{§} | 3 |
| Short track speedskating | 3 | 0 | 0 | 1 | 1 |
| Archery | 2 | 1 | 0 | 1 | 2 |
| Rowing | 2 | 0 | 0 | 1 | 1 |
| Figure skating | 2 | 1 | 0 | 0 | 1 |
| Kayaking | 2 | 0 | 0 | 0 | 0 |
| Bobsled | 1 | 0 | 0 | 0 | 0 |
| Beach volleyball | 1 | 0 | 0 | 0 | 0 |
| Boxing | 1 | 0 | 0 | 0 | 0 |
| Ice hockey | 1 | 0 | 0 | 0 | 0 |
| Rugby | 1 | 0 | 0 | 0 | 0 |
| Tug-of-war | 1 | 0 | 0 | 0 | 0 |
| Total | 193 | 17 | 15 | 28 | 60 |

^{†} an athlete is considered to have appeared once in each sport entered each time the Games of an Olympiad or Winter Games were held, including athletes who were alternates
^{♦} number of times that a person received an Olympic medal or honor for finishing among the top three in an event
^{‡} both on the 2020 gold medal-winning USA women's team
^{#} both on the 2012 silver medal-winning USA women's team
^{¶} all on the 2016 bronze medal-winning USA men's and women's teams
^{§} all on the 1984 bronze medal-winning USA women's team

== Olympians ==
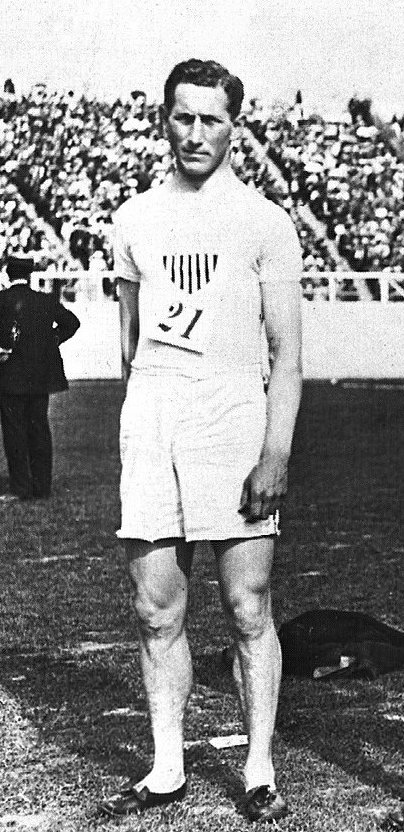
Nate Cartmell

=== 1904 ===
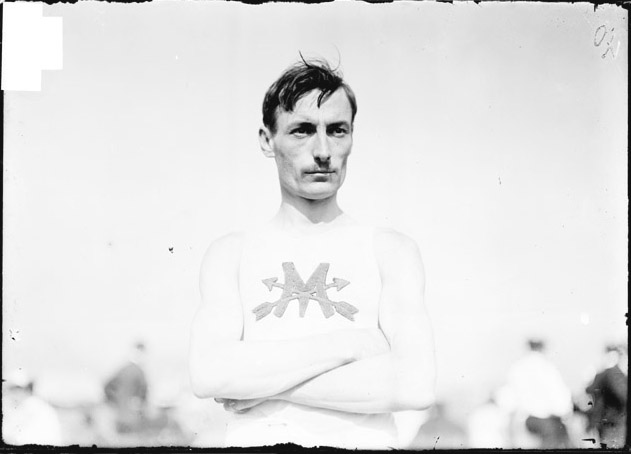
Fred Englehardt, 1904

(United States) St. Louis

| Name | Sport | Medal (if app.) and event |
|---|---|---|
| (United States) Nate Cartmell | Track and field | (100m) (200m) |
| (United States) Fred Englehardt | Track and field | (triple jump) |

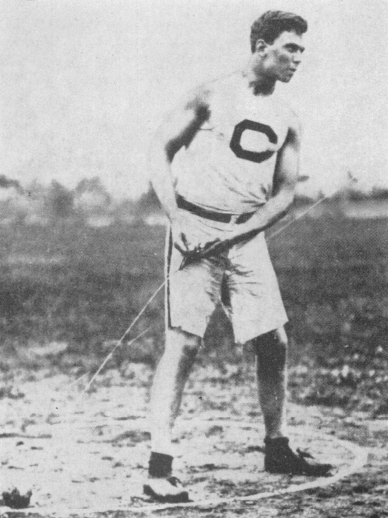
Lee Talbott

=== 1908 ===
(United Kingdom) London

| Name | Sport | Medal (if app.) and event |
|---|---|---|
| (United States) Nate Cartmell | Track and field | (1600m medley relay) (200m) |
| (United States) Lee Talbott | Track and field Wrestling; Tug-of-war | |

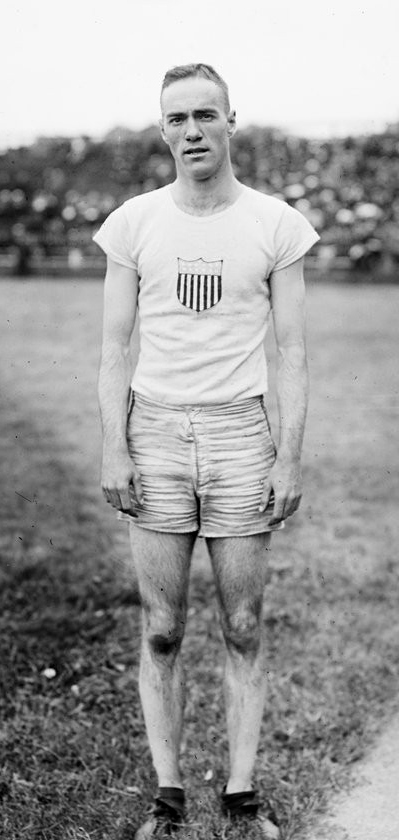
Harold Barron

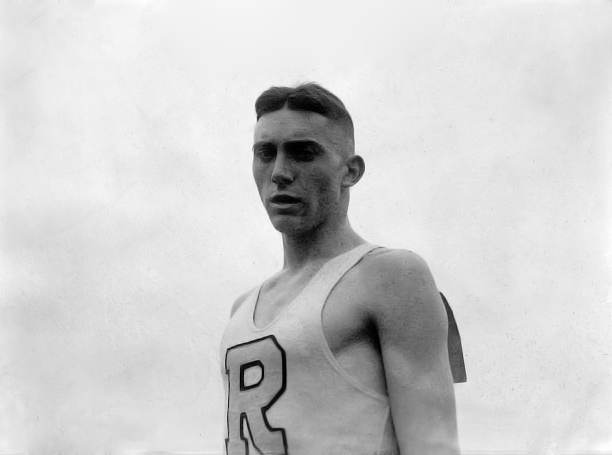
William Cox

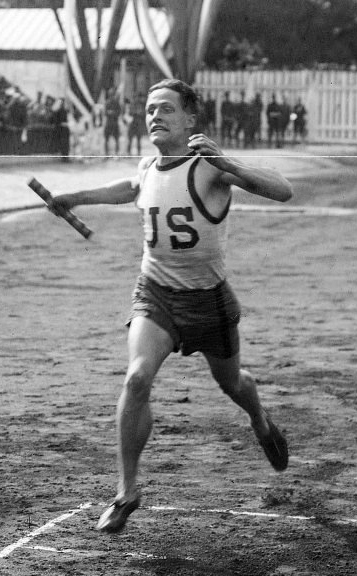
Larry Shields

=== 1920 ===
(Belgium) Antwerp

| Name | Sport | Medal (if app.) and event |
|---|---|---|
| (United States) Harold Barron | Track and field | (110m hurdles) |
| (United States) Alan Helffrich | Track and field | |
| (United States) Larry Shields | Track and field | (3000m team) (1500m) |

=== 1924 ===
(France) Paris

| Name | Sport | Medal (if app.) and event |
|---|---|---|
| (United States) William Cox | Track and field | (3000m team) |
| (United States) Schuyler Enck | Track and field | (800m) |
| (United States) Alan Helffrich | Track and field | (4 × 400m relay) |
| (United States) Carl Madera | Boxing | |
| (United States) Charles Moore, Sr. | Track and field | |
| (Japan) Katsutoshi Naito | Wrestling | (freestyle featherweight) |
| (United States) John Romig | Track and field | |
| (United States) Arthur Studenroth | Track and field | (cross country team) |

=== 1928 ===
(Netherlands) Amsterdam

| Name | Sport | Medal (if app.) and event |
|---|---|---|
| (United States) Ray Conger | Track and field | |
| (United States) John Romig | Track and field | |
| (United States) Al Bates | Track and field | (long jump) |

=== 1932 ===
(United States) Los Angeles

| Name | Sport |
|---|---|
| (United States) Paul Rekers | Track and field |

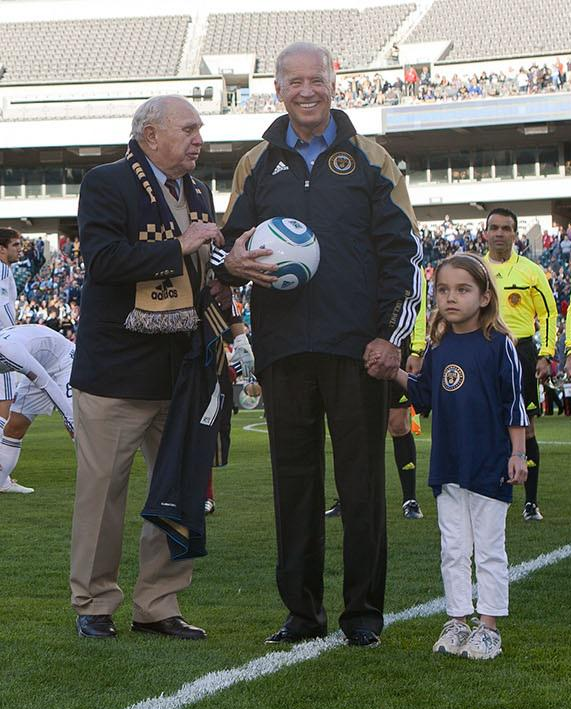
Walter Bahr, with Vice President Joe Biden in 2010

=== 1948 ===
(United Kingdom) London

| Name | Sport | Medal (if app.) and event |
|---|---|---|
| (United States) Walter Bahr | Soccer | |
| (United States) William Bonsall | Gymnastics | |
| (United States) Louis Bordo | Gymnastics | |
| (United States) Barney Ewell | Track and field | (4 × 100m relay) (100m) (200m) |
| (United States) Herman Goffberg | Track and field | |
| (United States) Bill Koll | Wrestling (freestyle) | |
| (United States) Ray Sorensen | Gymnastics | |
| (United States) Curt Stone | Track and field | |

=== 1952 ===
(Finland) Helsinki

| Name | Sport | Medal (if app.) and event |
|---|---|---|
| (United States) Horace Ashenfelter | Track and field | (3000m steeplechase) |
| (United States) William Ashenfelter | Track and field | |
| (United States) Curt Stone | Track and field | |

1952 Winter Olympic Games

(Norway) Oslo

| Name | Sport |
|---|---|
| (Austria) Kurt Oppelt | Figure skating |

=== 1956 ===
(Australia) Melbourne

| Name | Sport |
|---|---|
| (United States) Horace Ashenfelter | Track and field |
| (United States) Ronald Coder | Soccer |
| (United States) Dick Dyer | Fencing |
| (United States) Richard Packer | Soccer |
| (United States) Karl Schwenzfeier (Schier) | Gymnastics |
| (United States) Curt Stone | Track and field |
| (United States) Armando Vega | Gymnastics |

1956 Winter Olympic Games

(Italy) Cortina d'Ampezzo

| Name | Sport | Medal (if app.) and event |
|---|---|---|
| (Austria) Kurt Oppelt | Figure skating | (pair skating) |
| (United States) Edgar Seymour | Bobsled | |

=== 1960 ===
(Italy) Rome

| Name | Sport |
|---|---|
| (Sweden) Jean Cronstedt | Gymnastics |
| (United States) Dick Dyer | Fencing |
| (United States) Garland O'Quinn Jr. | Gymnastics |
| (United States) Ed Moran | Track and field |

=== 1964 ===
(Japan) Tokyo

| Name | Sport |
|---|---|
| (United States) Kathy Corrigan | Gymnastics |
| (Sweden) Lennart Hedmark | Track and field |
| (United States) Armando Vega | Gymnastics |
| (United States) Greg Weiss | Gymnastics |

=== 1968 ===
Mexico City

| Name | Sport | Medal (if app. and event) |
|---|---|---|
| (United States) Jane Barkman-Brown | Swimming | (4 × 100m freestyle relay) (200m freestyle) |
| (United States) James Culhane | Gymnastics | |
| (United States) Steve Cohen | Gymnastics | |
| (Sweden) Lennart Hedmark | Track and field | |
| (United States) William Reilly | Track and field | |

=== 1972 ===
(Germany) Munich

| Name | Sport | Medal (if app.) and event |
|---|---|---|
| (United States) Marshall Avener | Gymnastics | |
| (United States) Jane Barkman-Brown | Swimming | (4 × 100m freestyle relay) |
| (United States) James Culhane | Gymnastics | |
| (United States) Steven Hayden | Track and field | |
| (Sweden) Lennart Hedmark | Track and field | |
| (Japan) Hachiro Oishi | Wrestling | |
| (The Bahamas) Mike Sands | Track and field | |

=== 1976 ===
(Canada) Montreal

| Name | Sport | Medal (if app.) and event |
|---|---|---|
| (United States) Marshall Avener | Gymnastics | |
| (United States) Diane Braceland (-Vreugdenhil) | Rowing | |
| (Sweden) Lennart Hedmark | Track and field | |
| (Norway) Knut Hjeltnes | Track and field | |
| (United States) Al Jackson | Track and field | |
| (United States) Steven Kaplan | Fencing | |
| (Canada) Romel Raffin | Basketball | |
| (United States) Susan Rojcewicz | Basketball | (team) |
| (The Bahamas) Mike Sands | Track and field | |
| (United States) Michael Shine | Track and field | (400m hurdles) |
| (United States) Gene Whelan | Gymnastics | |
| (United States) Wayne Young | Gymnastics | |

=== 1980 ===
(Soviet Union) Moscow

Jana Angelakis, Greg Fredericks, Charlene Morett, Christine Larson-Mason, Knut Hjeltnes (Norway) and Romel Raffin (Canada) were all named to their respective Olympic teams but did not participate due to the 1980 Summer Olympics boycott.

=== 1984 ===
(United States) Los Angeles

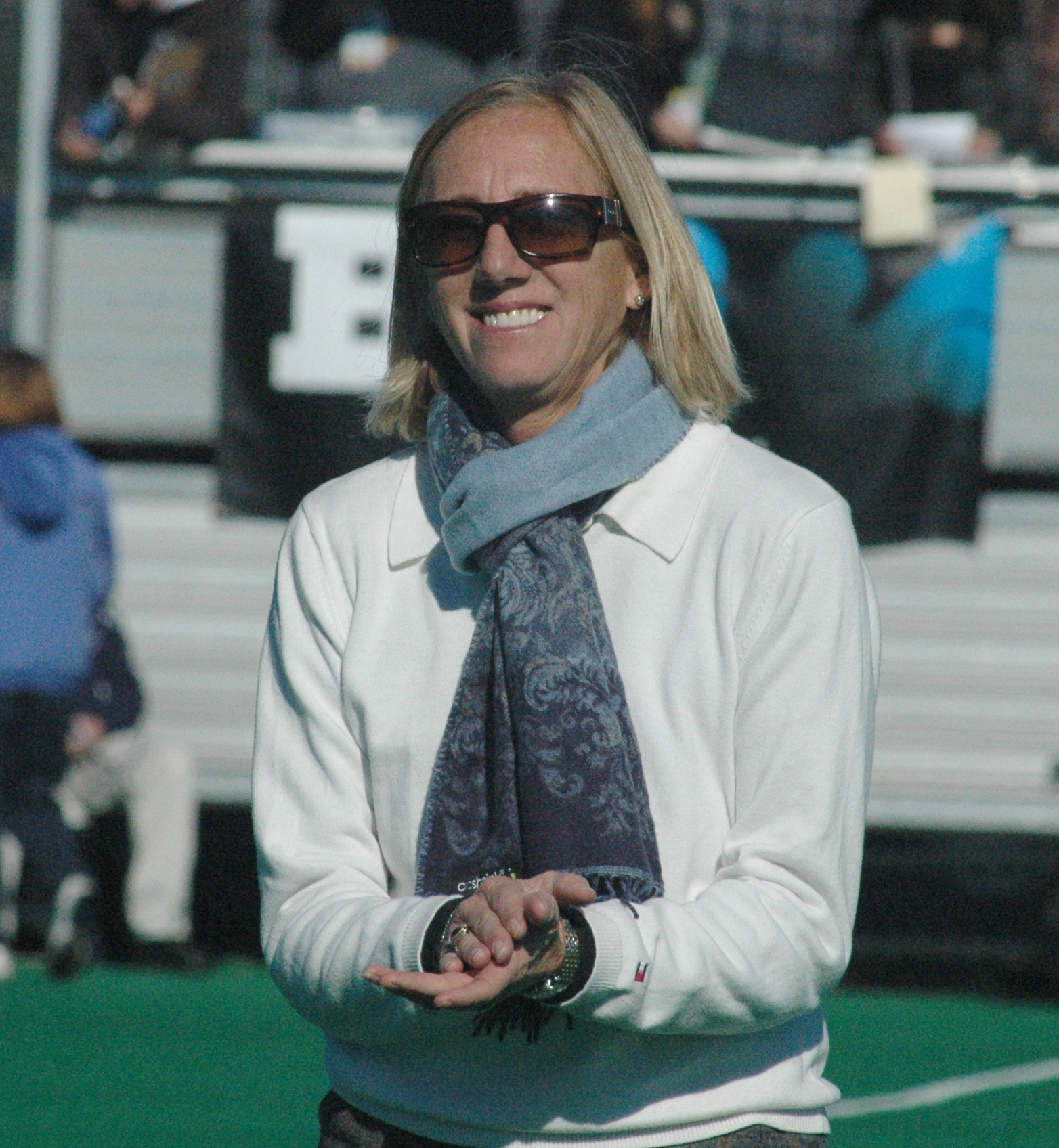
Charlene Morett

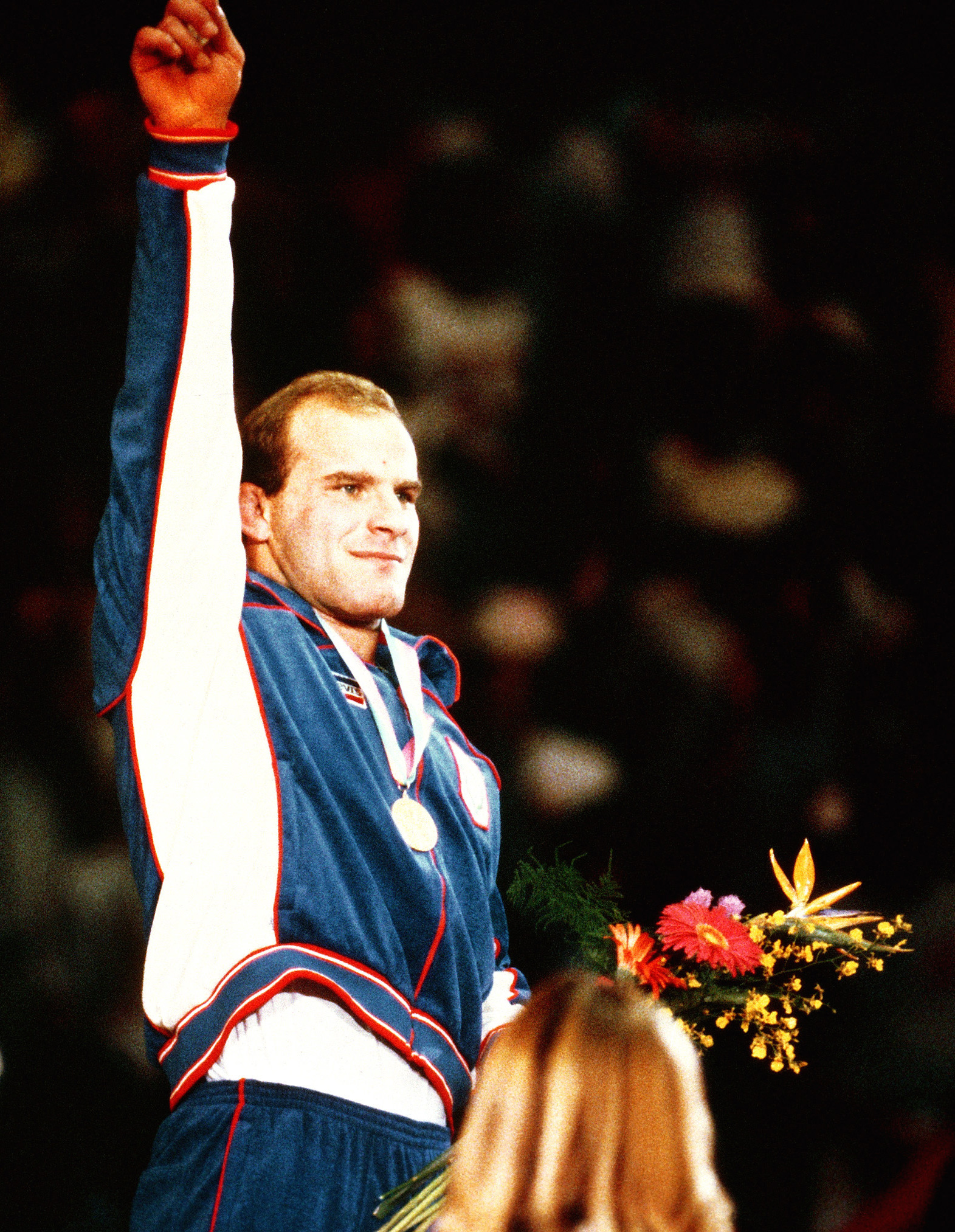
Lou Banach

| Name | Sport | Medal (if app.) and event |
|---|---|---|
| (United States) Jana Angelakis | Fencing | |
| (United Kingdom) Terry Bartlett | Gymnastics | |
| (United States) Lou Banach | Wrestling (freestyle) | (light heavyweight) |
| (Ghana) Francis Dodoo | Track and field | |
| (United States) Glenn Dubis | Rifle | |
| (Norway) Knut Hjeltnes | Track and field | |
| (United States) Christine Larson-Mason | Field hockey | (team) |
| (United States) Charlene Morett | Field hockey | (team) |
| (Canada) Romel Raffin | Basketball | |
| (United States) Brenda Stauffer | Field hockey | (team) |

=== 1988 ===
(South Korea) Seoul

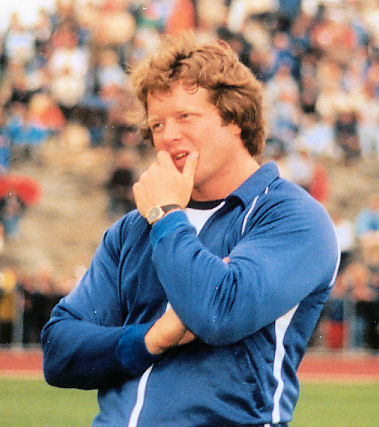
Knut Hjeltnes

| Name | Sport | Medal (if app.) and event |
|---|---|---|
| (United Kingdom) Terry Bartlett | Gymnastics | |
| (United States) Ken Chertow | Wrestling | |
| (Ghana) Francis Dodoo | Track and field | |
| (United States) Glenn Dubis | Rifle | |
| (Norway) Knut Hjeltnes | Track and field | |
| (United States) Suzie McConnell | Basketball | (team) |
| (Canada) Romel Raffin | Basketball | |

=== 1992 ===
(Spain) Barcelona

| Name | Sport | Medal (if app.) and event |
|---|---|---|
| (United Kingdom) Terry Bartlett | Gymnastics | |
| (United States) J-Me Carney | Cycling | |
| (United States) Ken Chertow | Wrestling | |
| (Ghana) Francis Dodoo | Track and field | |
| (United States) Mary Ellen Clark | Diving | (10m platform) |
| (United States) Greg Elinsky | Wrestling | |
| (United States) Suzie McConnell | Basketball | (team) |
| (United Kingdom) Ian Shelley | Gymnastics | |
| (Republic of Ireland) Barry Walsh | Track and field | |
| (United States) Rich Weiss | Kayaking | |

=== 1996 ===
(United States) Atlanta

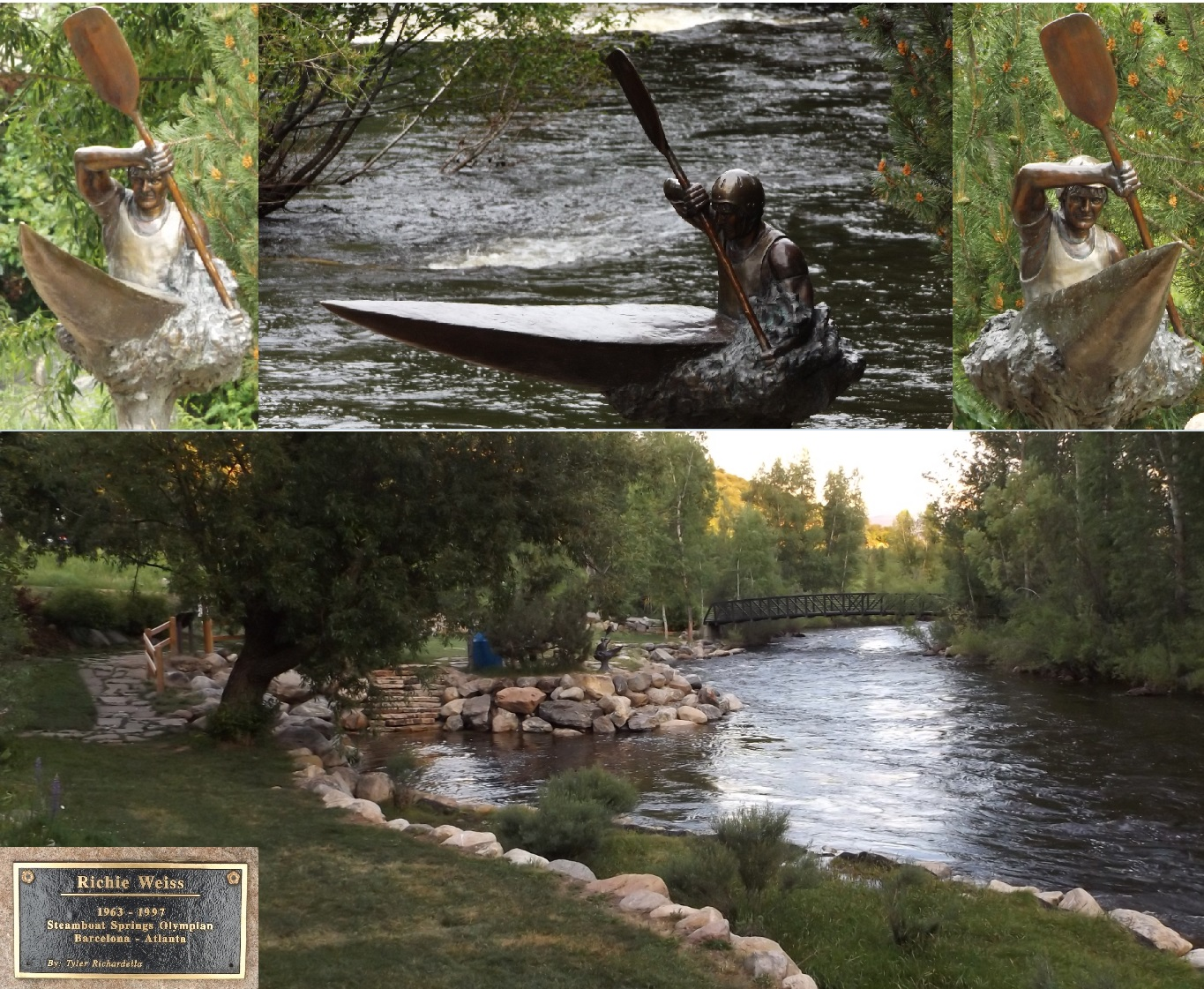
Bronze statue of Rich Weiss by Tyler Mark Richardella

| Name | Sport | Medal (if app.) and event |
|---|---|---|
| (Japan) Sanshiro Abe | Wrestling | |
| (United Kingdom) Dominic Brindle | Gymnastics | |
| (United States) Olga Chernyak | Fencing | |
| (Ghana) Francis Dodoo | Track and field | |
| (United States) Mary Ellen Clark | Diving | (10m platform) |
| (United States) Peter Cox | Fencing | |
| (United States) Salima Davidson | Volleyball | |
| (United States) Glenn Dubis | Rifle | |
| (United States) John Hargis | Swimming | (men's 4x100 m medley relay) |
| (United States) C.J. Hunter | Track and field | |
| (United States) Suzanne Paxton | Fencing | |
| (United States) Tom Strzalkowski | Fencing | |
| (United States) Rich Weiss | Kayaking | |
| (United States) Rod White | Archery | (men's team) |

=== 2000 ===
(Australia) Sydney

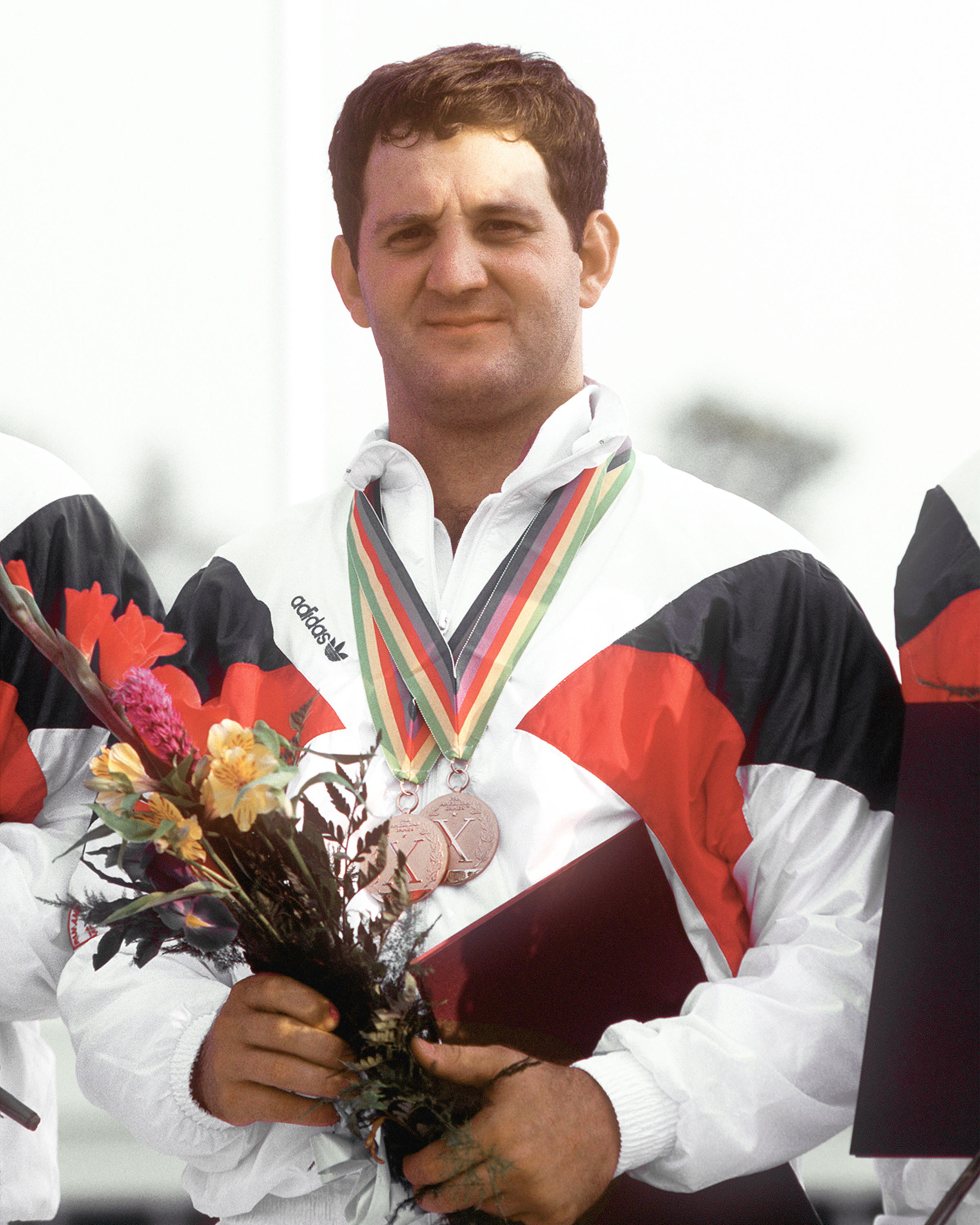
Glenn Dubis

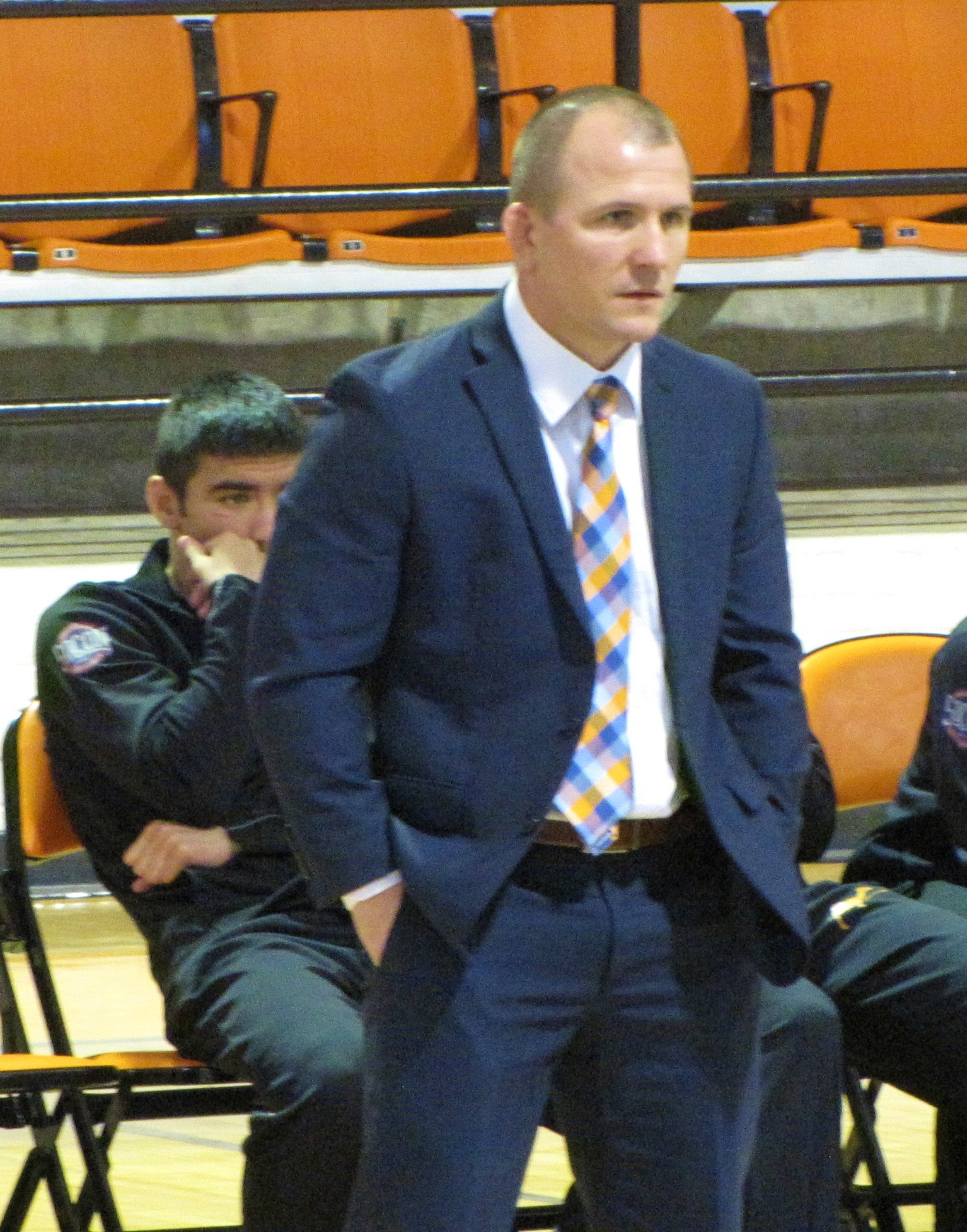
Kolat in November 2015

| Name | Sport | Medal (if app.) and event |
|---|---|---|
| (United States) J-Me Carney | Cycling | |
| (United States) Glenn Dubis | Rifle | |
| (United States) Sammie Henson | Wrestling | (bantamweight, freestyle) |
| (United States) Cary Kolat | Wrestling | |
| (United States) Kerry McCoy | Wrestling | |
| (Germany) Alexander Weber | Fencing | (team sabre) |
| (United States) Christie Welsh | Soccer | |
| (United States) Rod White | Archery | (men's team) |

=== 2002 ===
(United States) Salt Lake City

| Name | Sport |
|---|---|
| (United States) Allison Baver | Short track speedskating |

=== 2004 ===
(Greece) Athens

| Name | Sport | Medal (if app.) and event |
|---|---|---|
| (South Africa) Eugene Botes | Swimming | |
| (Puerto Rico) Ramon Hernandez | Beach volleyball | |
| (United States) Kerry McCoy | Wrestling | |
| (United States) Connie Moore | Track and field | |
| (United States) Cael Sanderson | Wrestling | (light-heavyweight, freestyle) |
| (Puerto Rico) Luis Vargas | Gymnastics | |

=== 2006 ===
(Italy) Torino

| Name | Sport |
|---|---|
| (United States) Allison Baver | Short track speedskating |

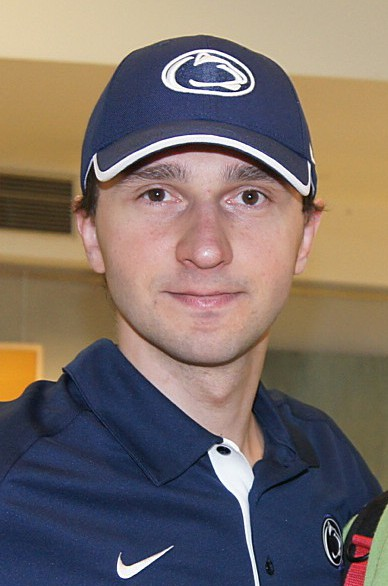
Adam Wiercioch

=== 2008 ===
(China) Beijing

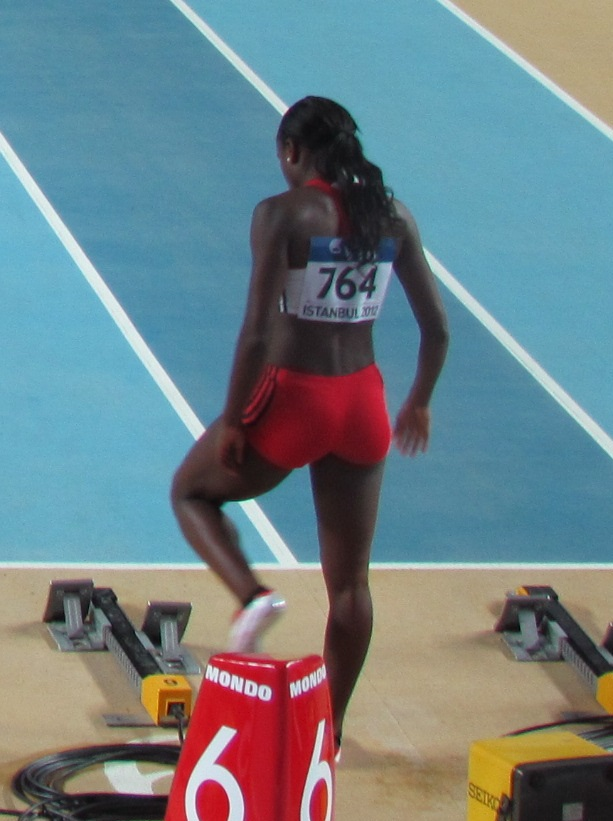
Aleesha Barber

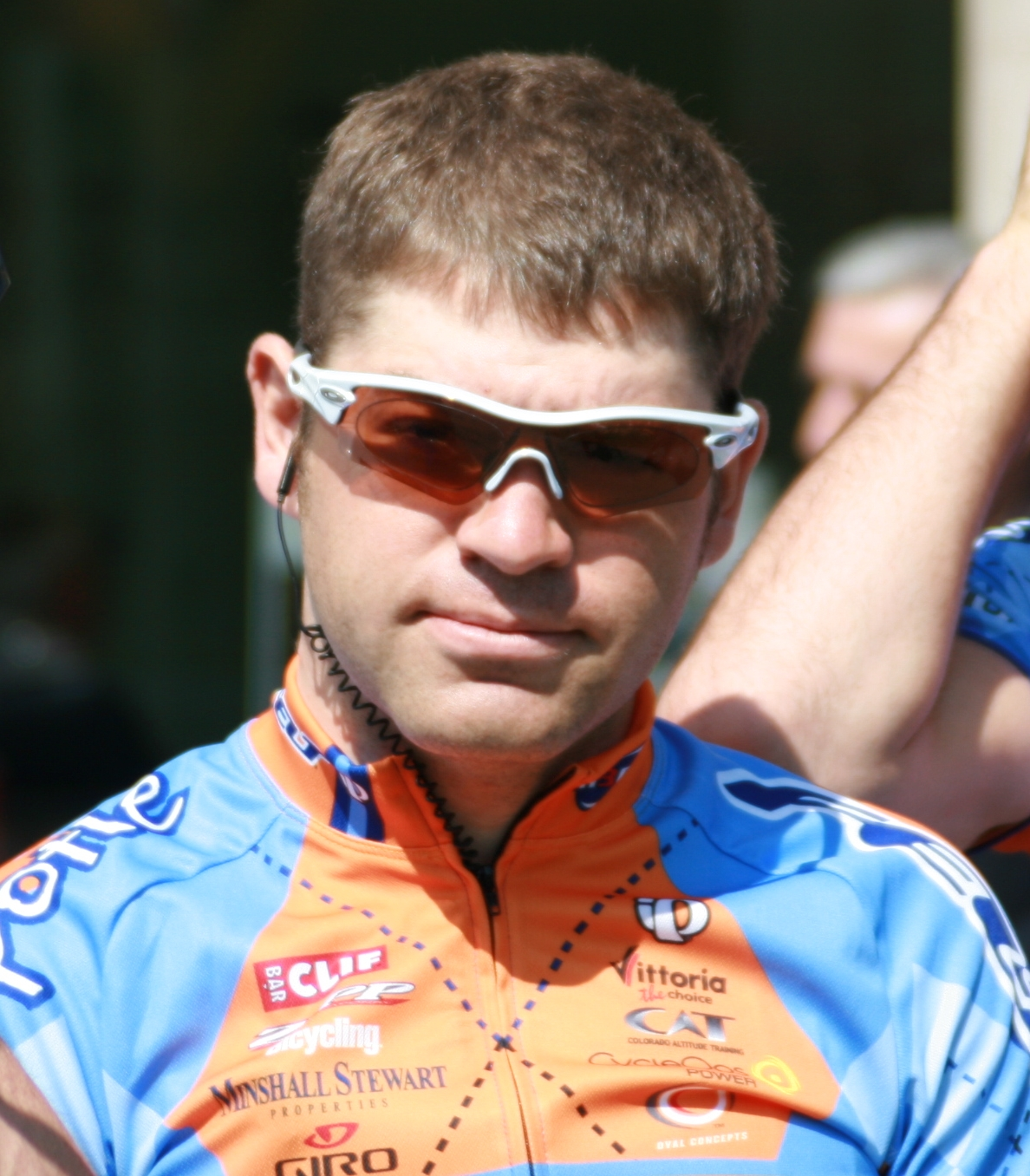
Mike Friedman

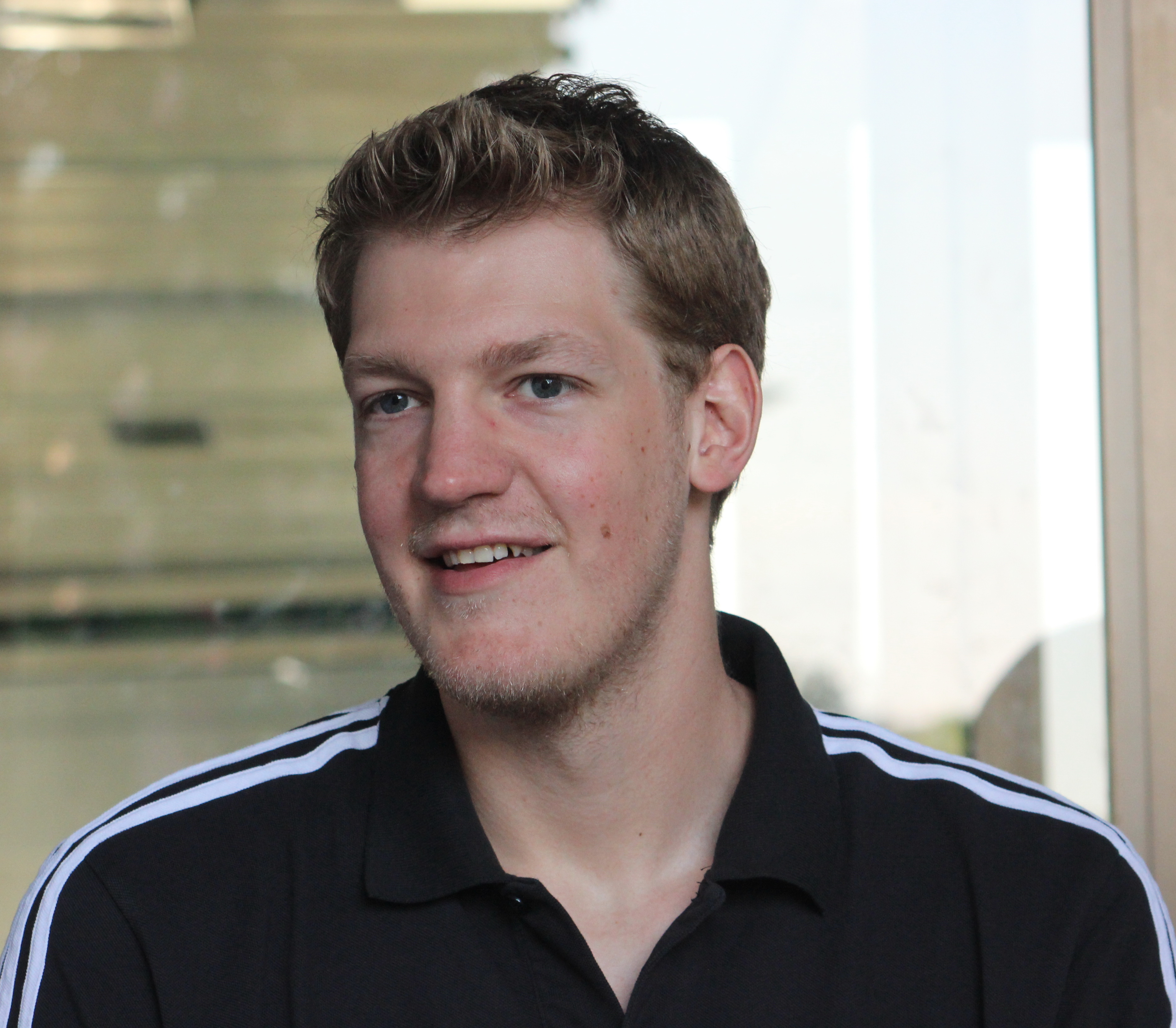
Jan Jagla

| Name | Sport | Medal (if app.) and event |
|---|---|---|
| (Nigeria) Toyin Augustus | Track and field | |
| (Trinidad and Tobago) Aleesha Barber | Track and field | |
| (United States) Brian Sell | Track and field | |
| (United States) Michael Friedman | Cycling | |
| (Germany) Jan Jagla | Basketball | |
| (United States) Bobby Lea | Cycling | |
| (Canada) Erin McLeod | Soccer | |
| (Suriname) Kirsten Nieuwendam | Track and field | |
| (Thailand) Nontapat Panchan | Fencing | |
| (United States) Kevin Tan | Gymnastics | (team) |
| (Poland) Adam Wiercioch | Fencing | (team épée) |
| (United States) Doris Willette | Fencing | |

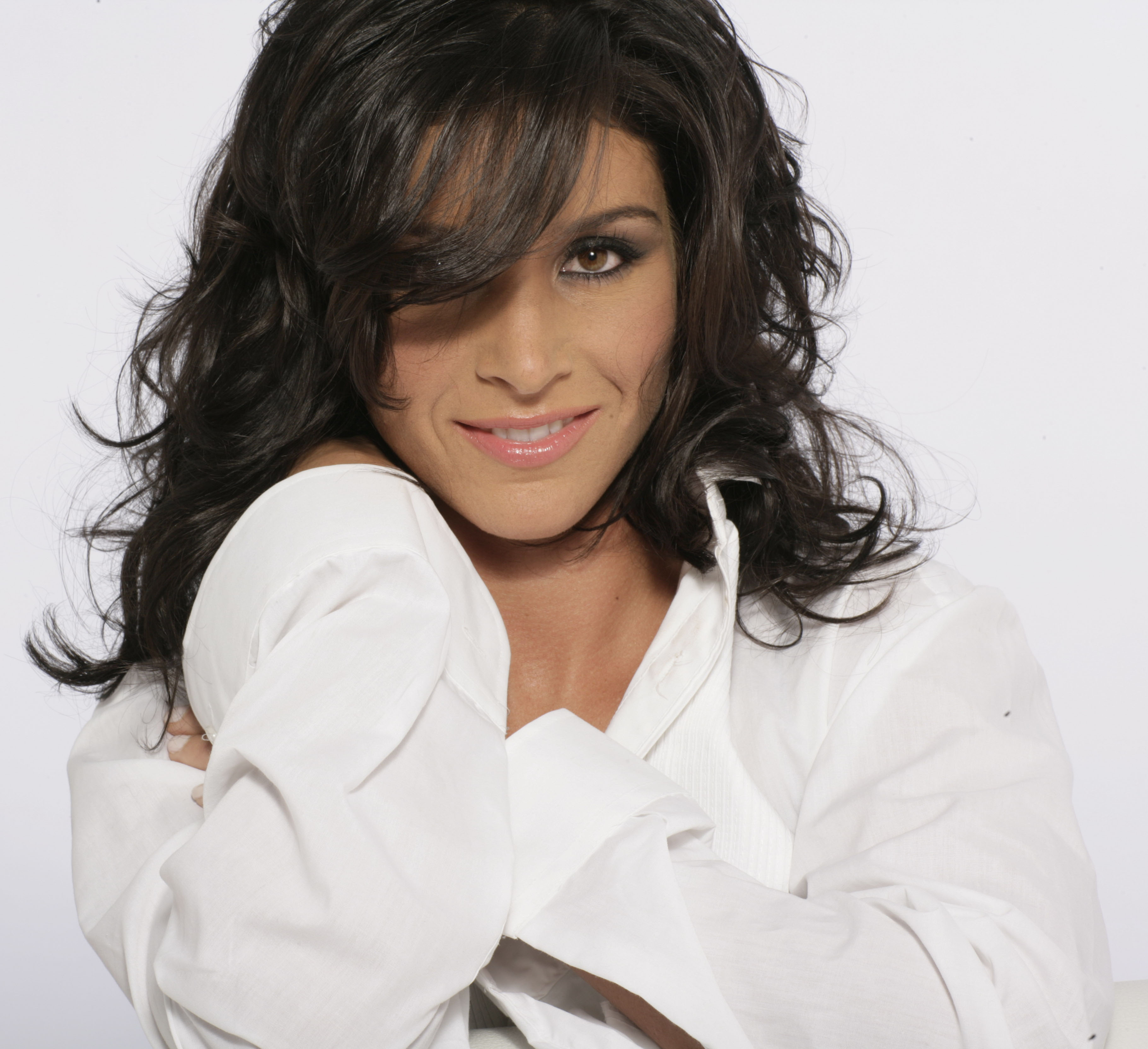
Allison Baver

=== 2010 ===
(Canada) Vancouver

| Name | Sport | Medal (if app.) and event |
|---|---|---|
| (United States) Allison Baver | Short track speedskating | (3000m relay) |

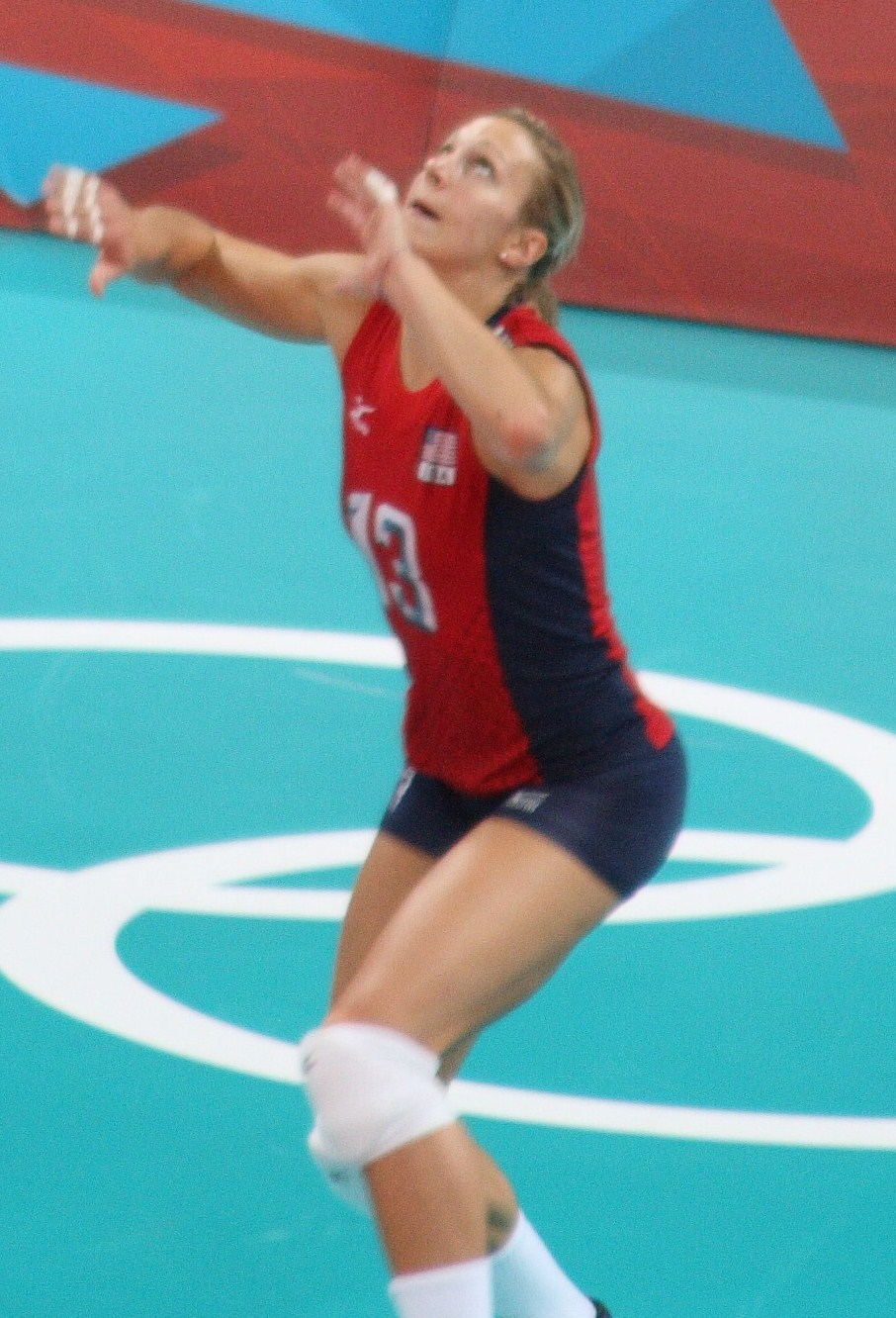
Christa Harmotto

=== 2012 ===
(United Kingdom) London

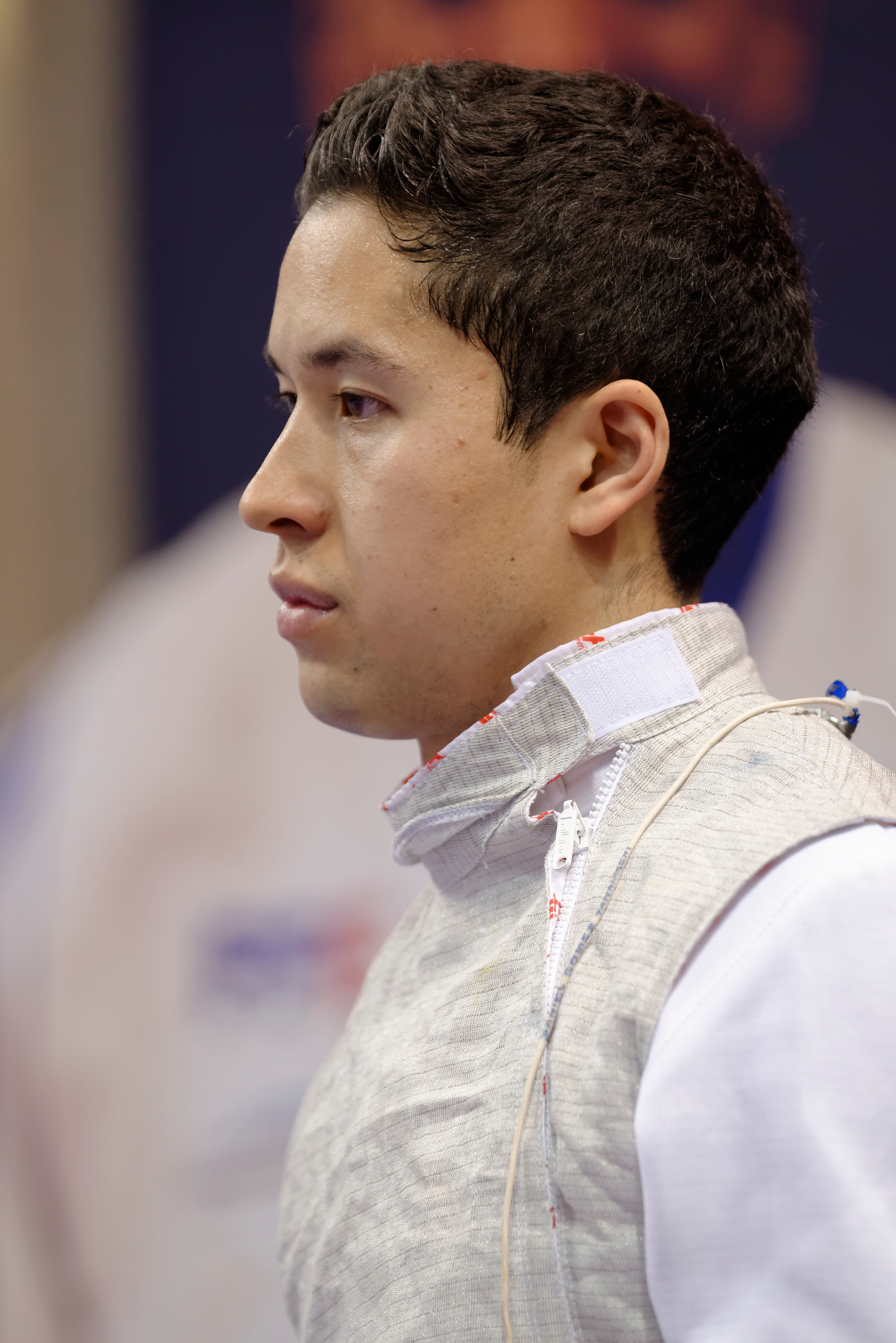
Daniel Gómez Tanamachi

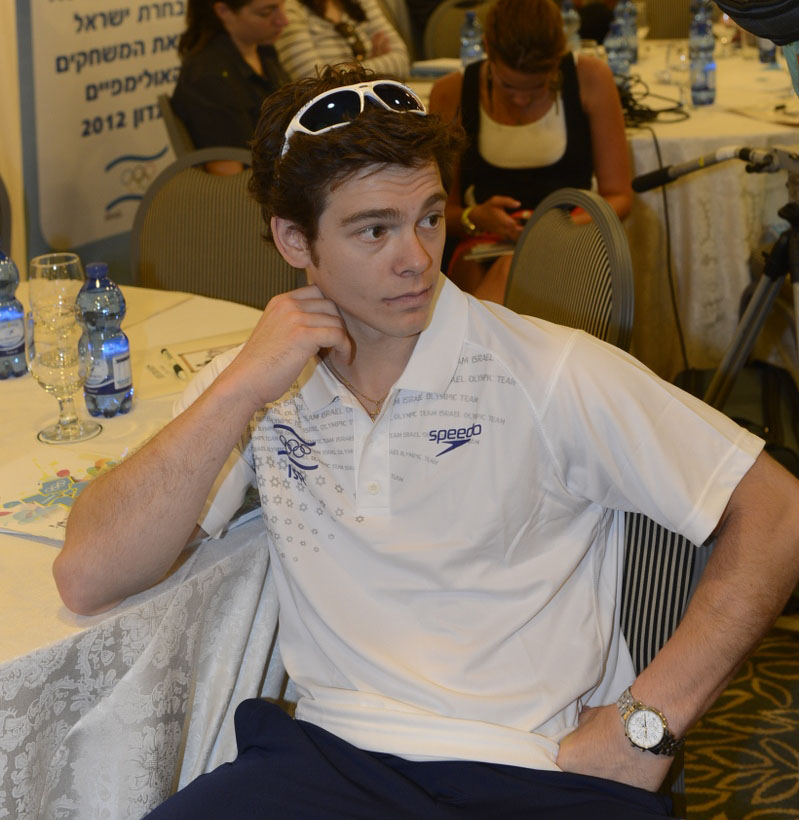
Felix Aronovich

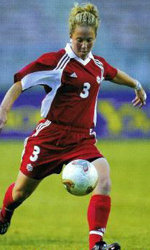
Carmelina Moscato

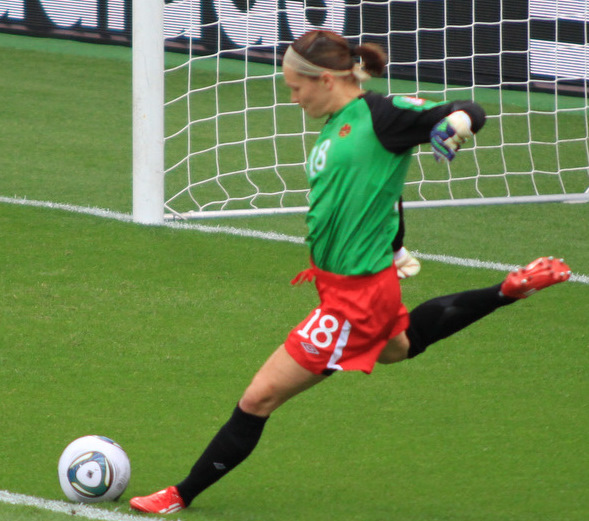
Erin Mcleod

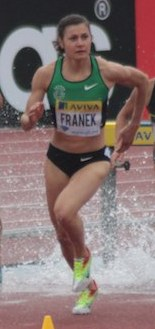
Bridget Franek

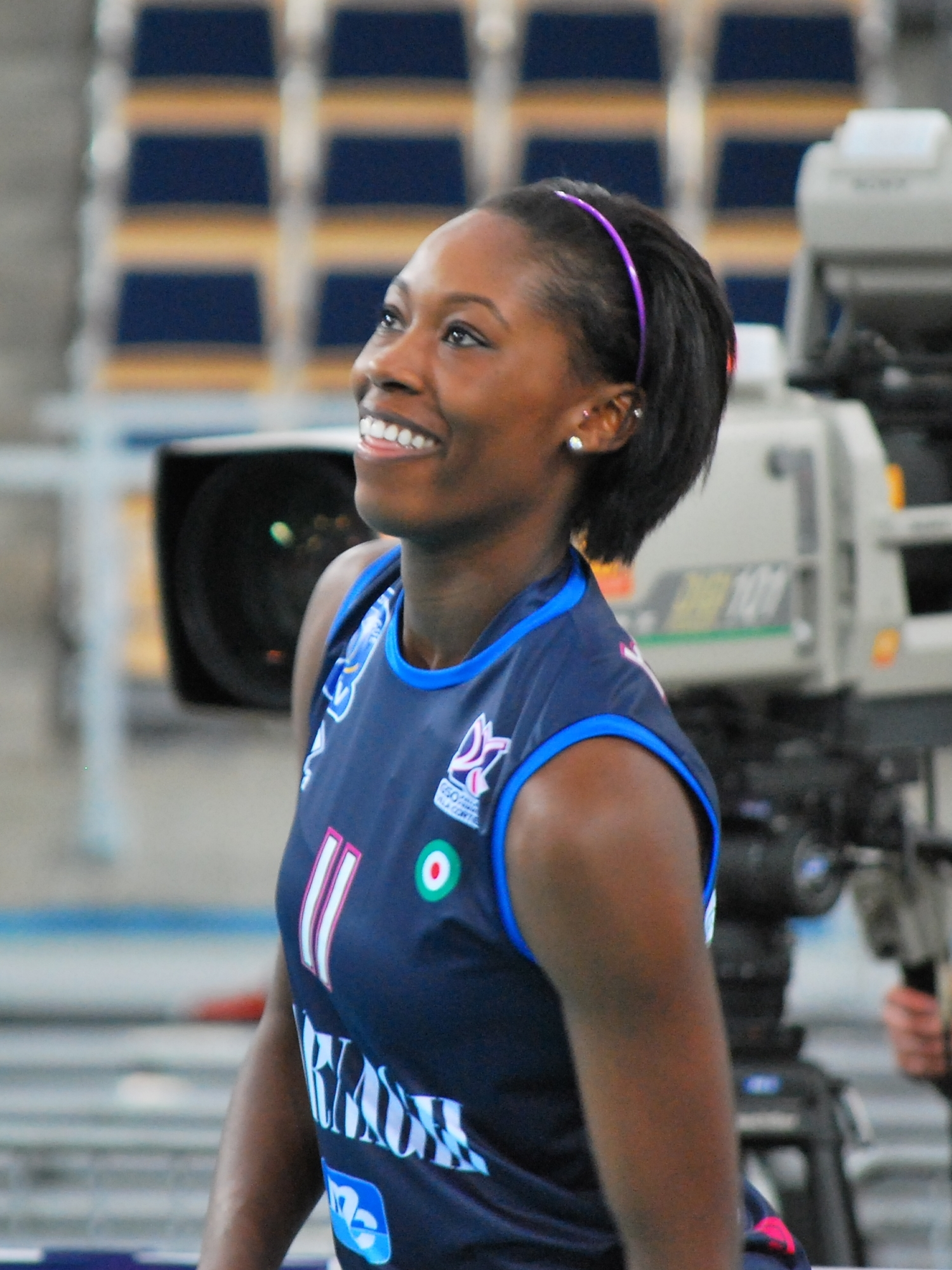
Megan Hodge

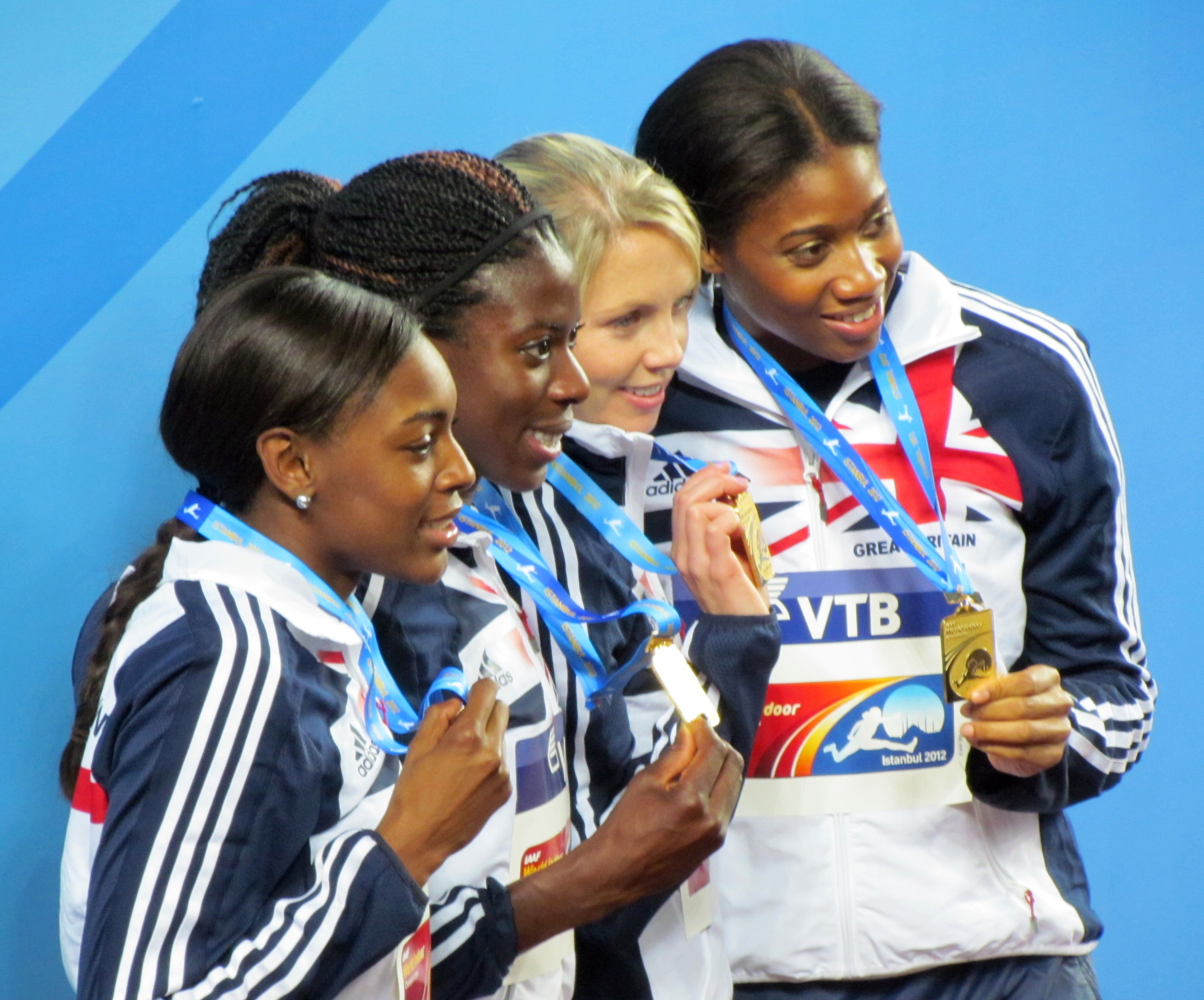
Shana Cox (right)

| Name | Sport | Medal (if app.) and event |
|---|---|---|
| (United States) Matt Anderson | Volleyball | |
| (Israel) Felix Aronovich | Gymnastics | |
| (Jamaica) Dominique Blake | Track and field | (women's 4×400m relay) |
| (United States) Miles Chamley-Watson | Fencing | |
| (United Kingdom) Shana Cox | Track and field | |
| (United States) Natalie Dell | Rowing | (women's quadruple sculls) |
| (United States) Nicole Fawcett | Volleyball | |
| (United States) Bridget Franek | Track and field | |
| (United States) Alisha Glass | Volleyball | |
| (Mexico) Daniel Gómez Tanamachi | Fencing | |
| (United States) Christa Harmotto | Volleyball | (women's team) |
| (United States) Megan Hodge | Volleyball | (women's team) |
| (United States) Bobby Lea | Cycling | |
| (Canada) Erin McLeod | Soccer | (women's team) |
| (Canada) Carmelina Moscato | Soccer | (women's team) |
| (Suriname) Kirsten Nieuwendam | Track and field | |
| (Puerto Rico) Tommy Ramos | Gymnastics | |
| (United States) Jake Varner | Wrestling | (men's freestyle 96 kg) |
| (United States) Ryan Whiting | Track and field | |
| (United States) Doris Willette | Fencing | |

=== 2016 ===
(Brazil) Rio de Janeiro

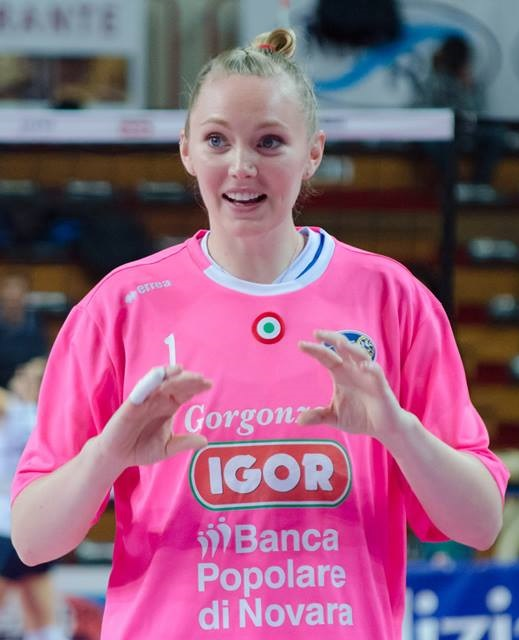
Nicole Fawcett

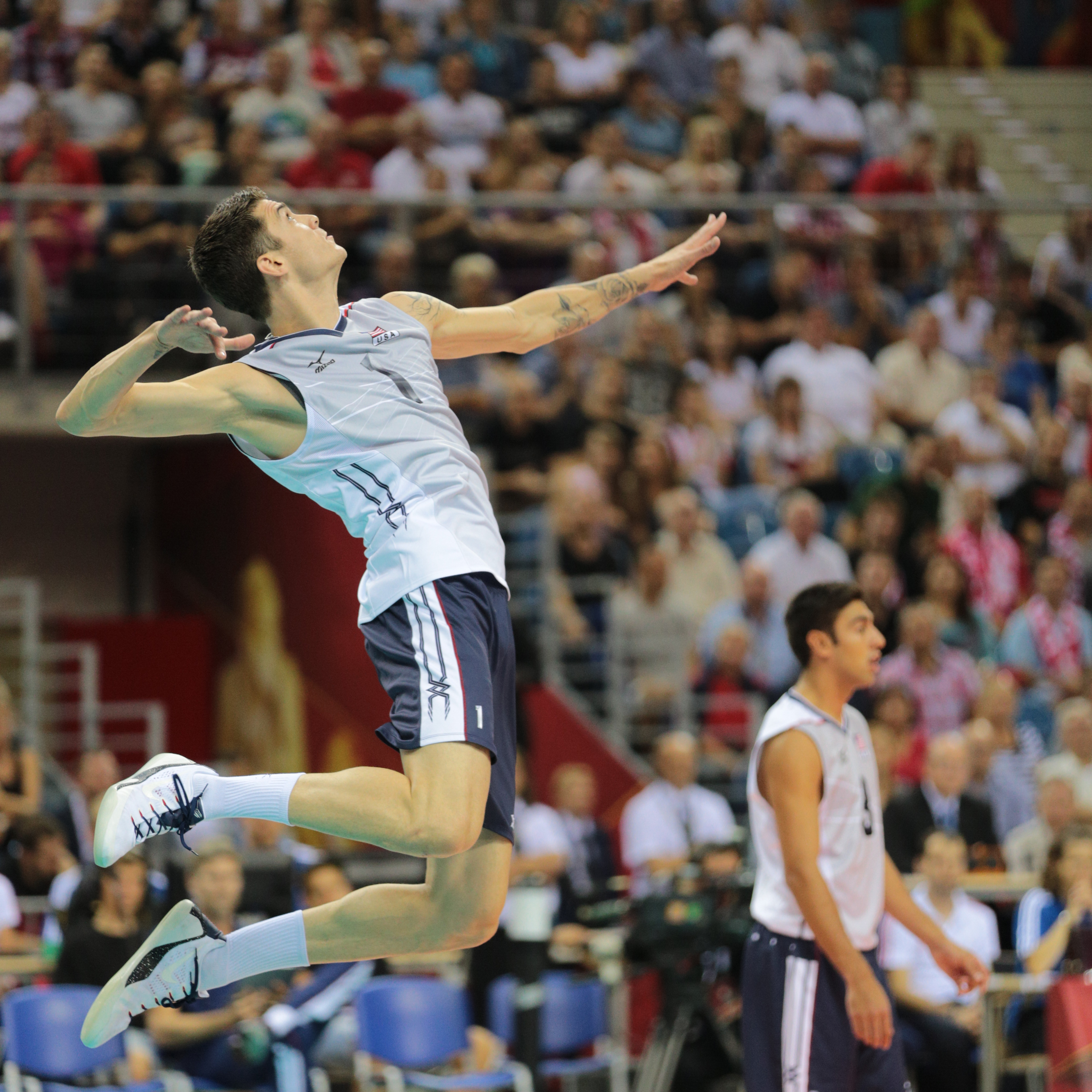
Matt Anderson

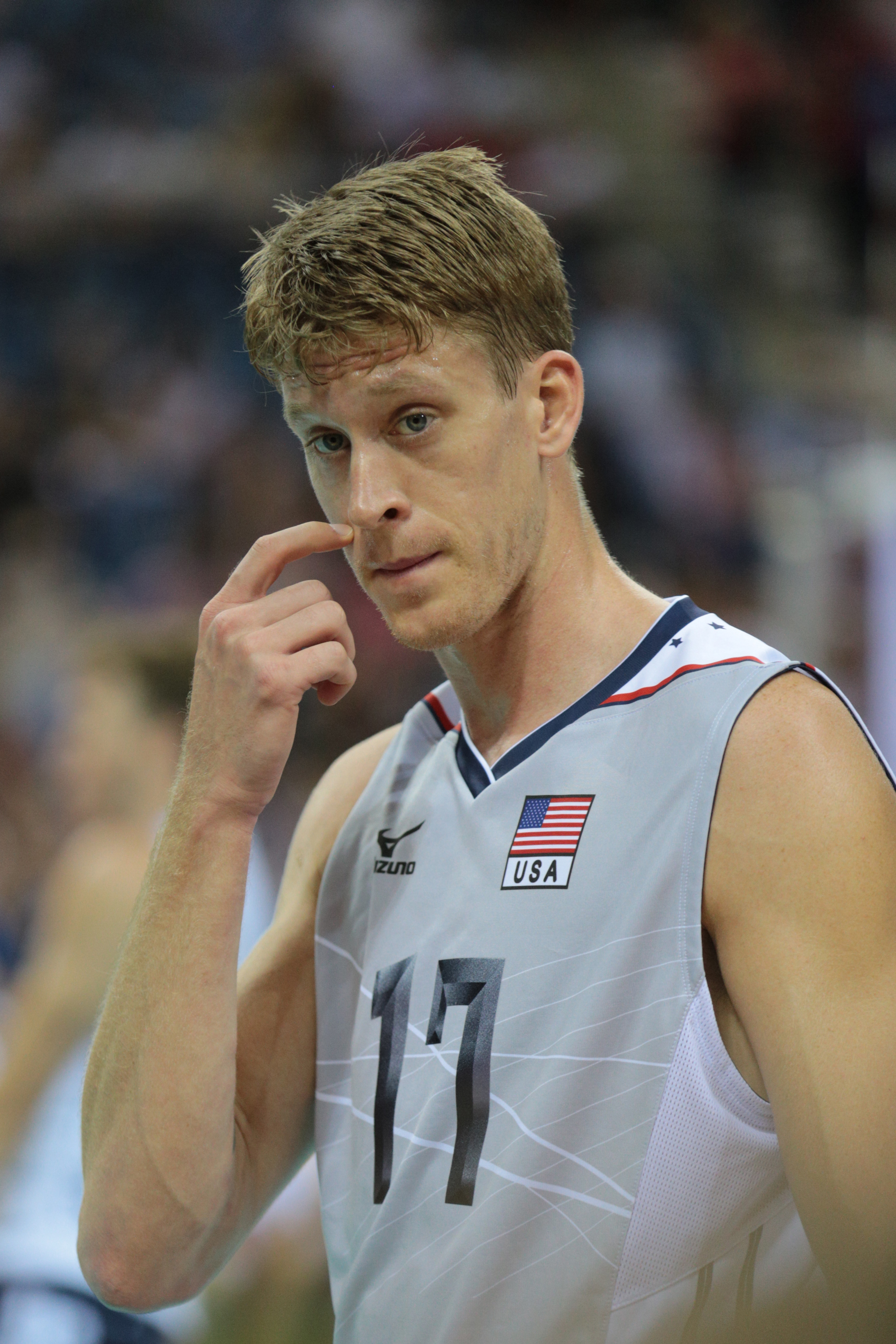
Max Holt

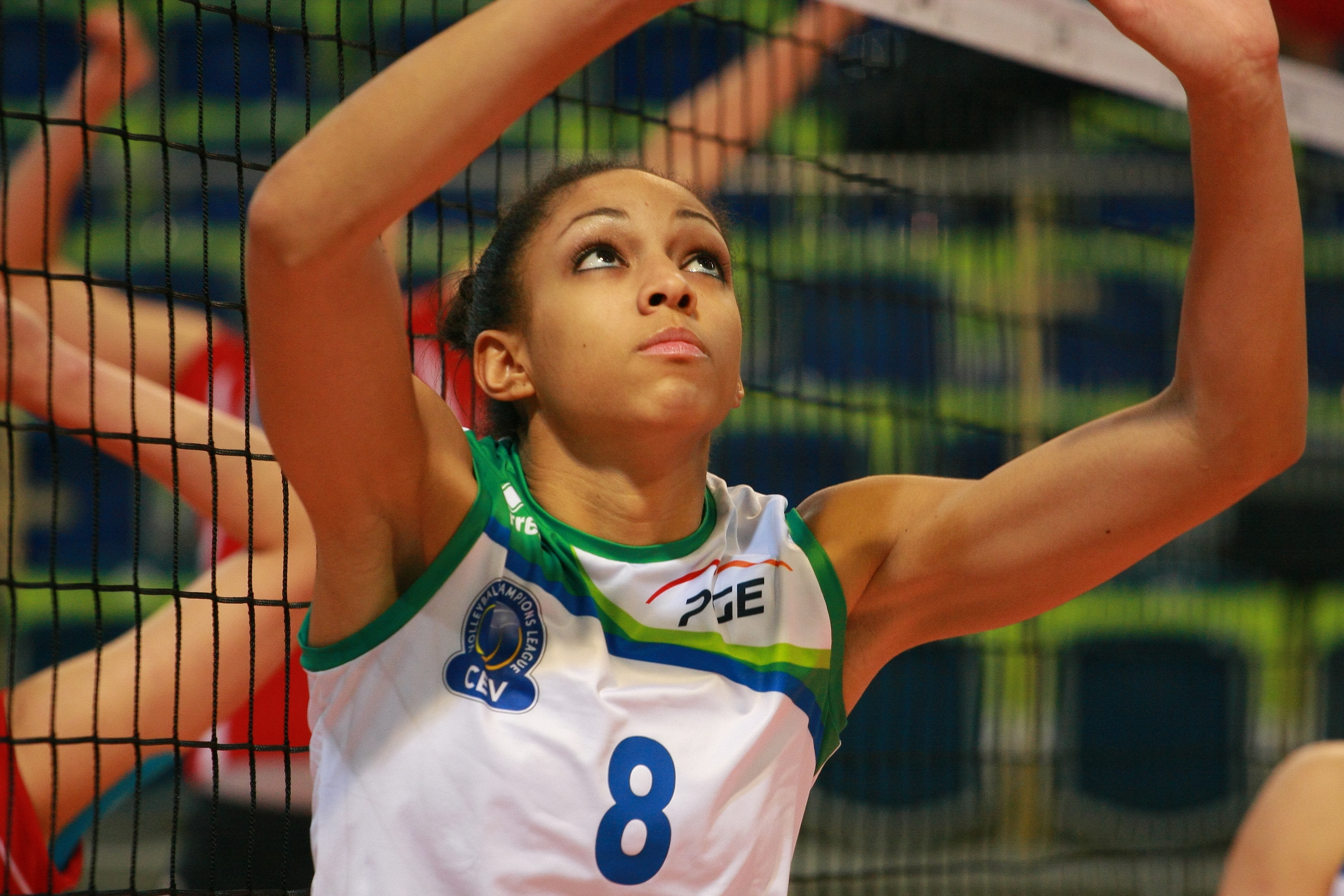
Alisha Glass

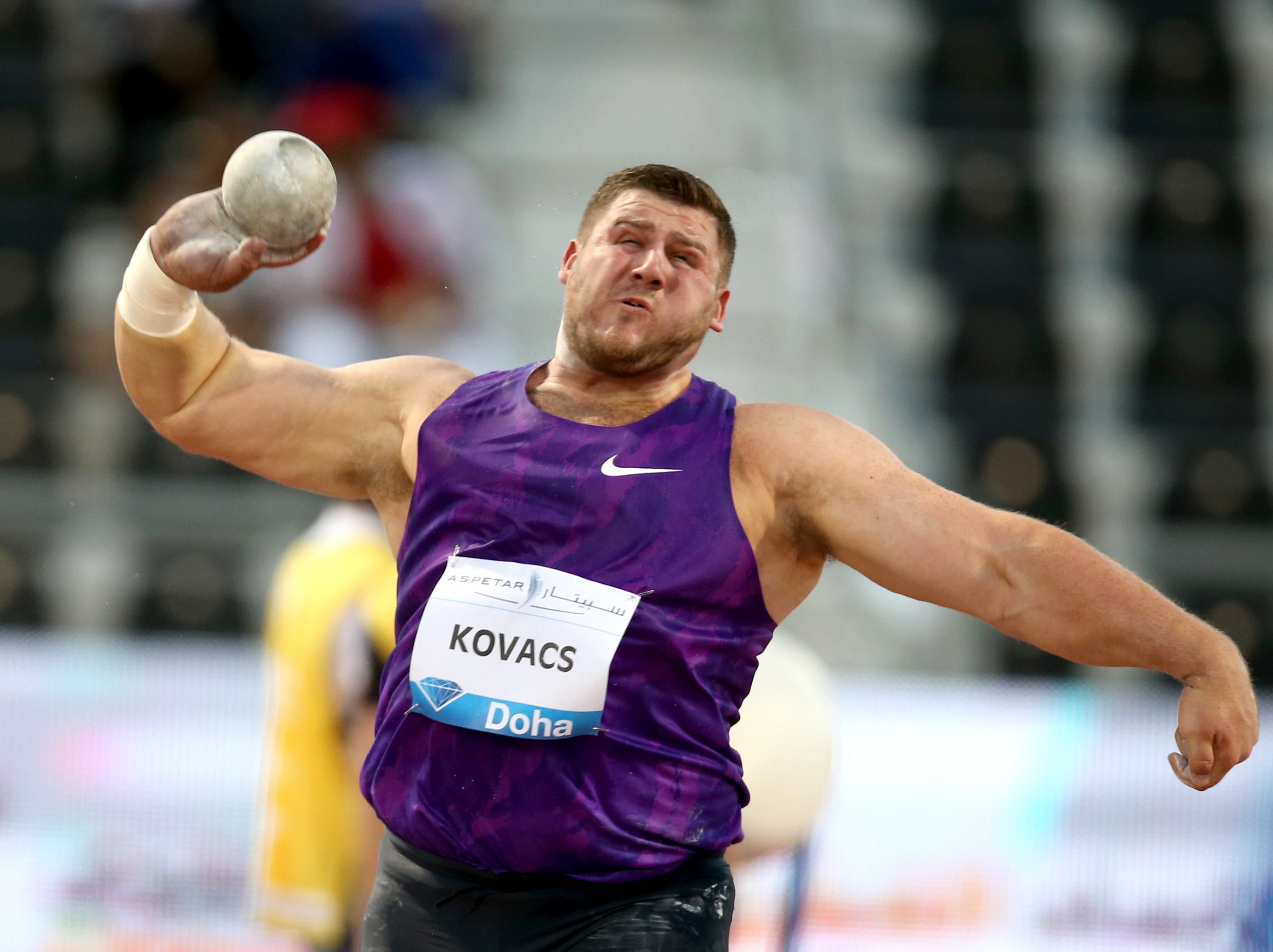
Joe Kovacs

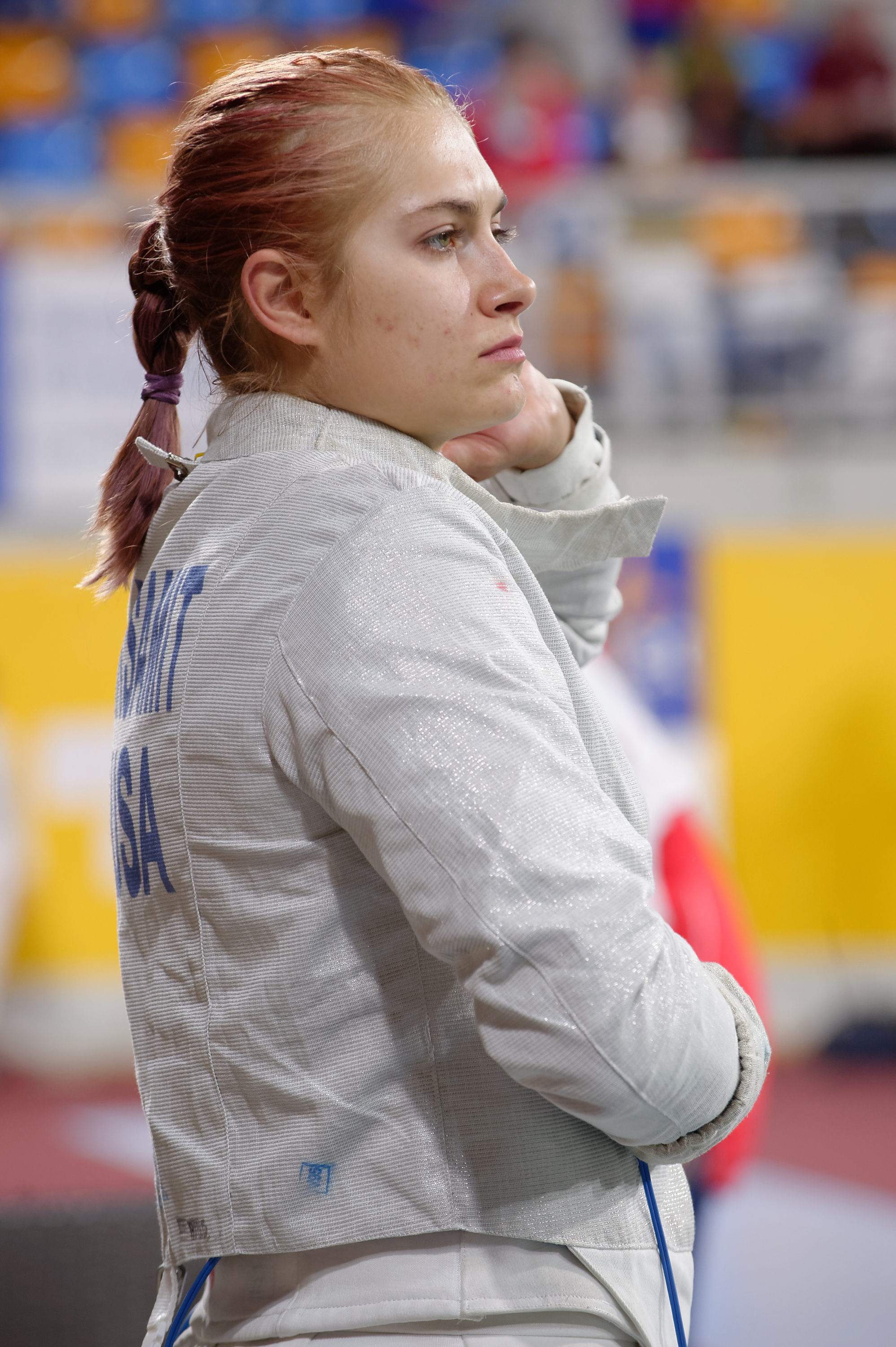
Monica Aksamit

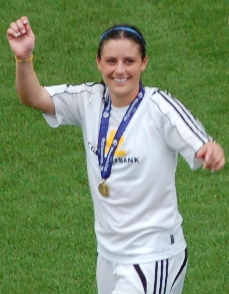
Ali Krieger

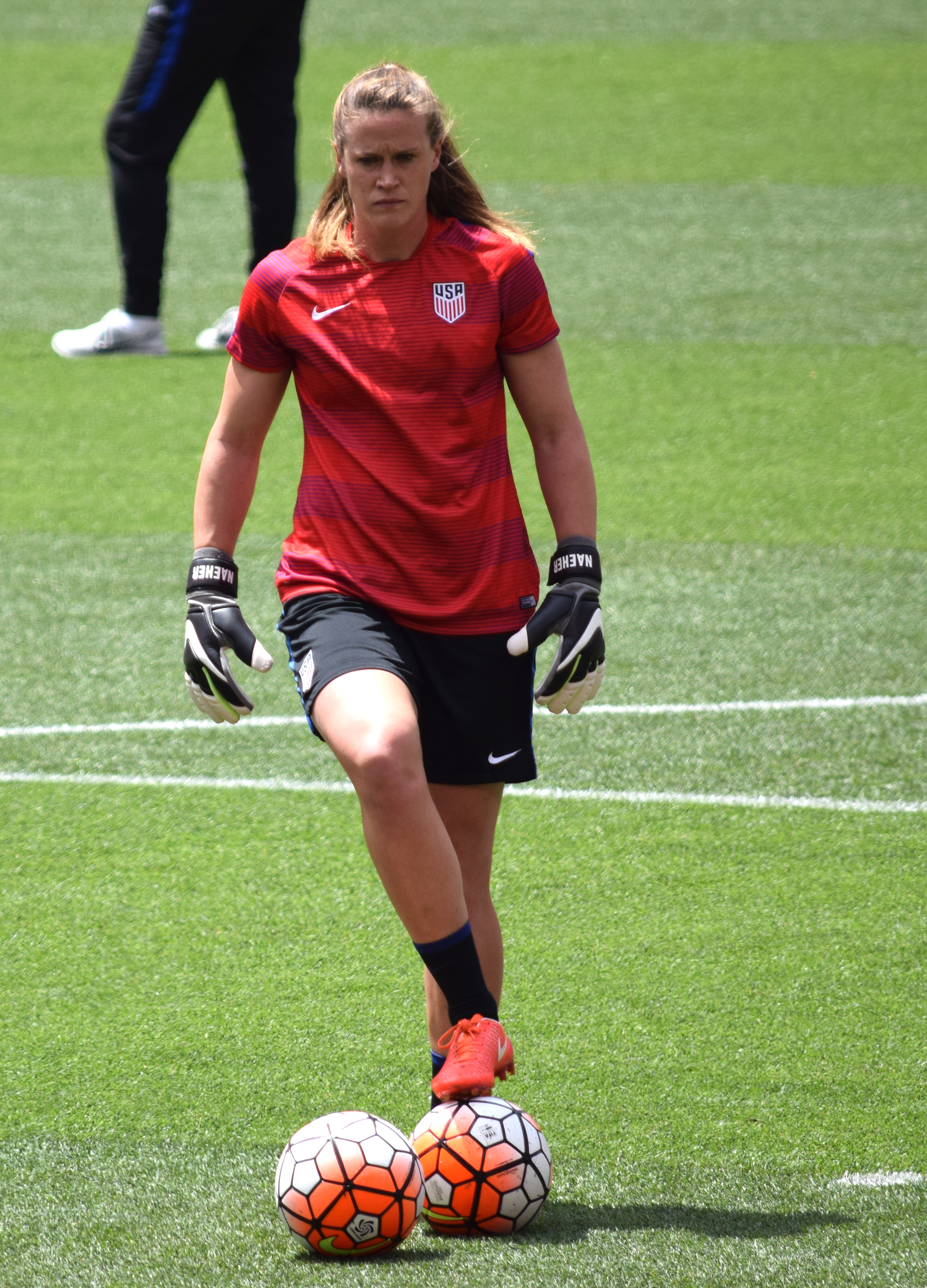
Alyssa Naeher

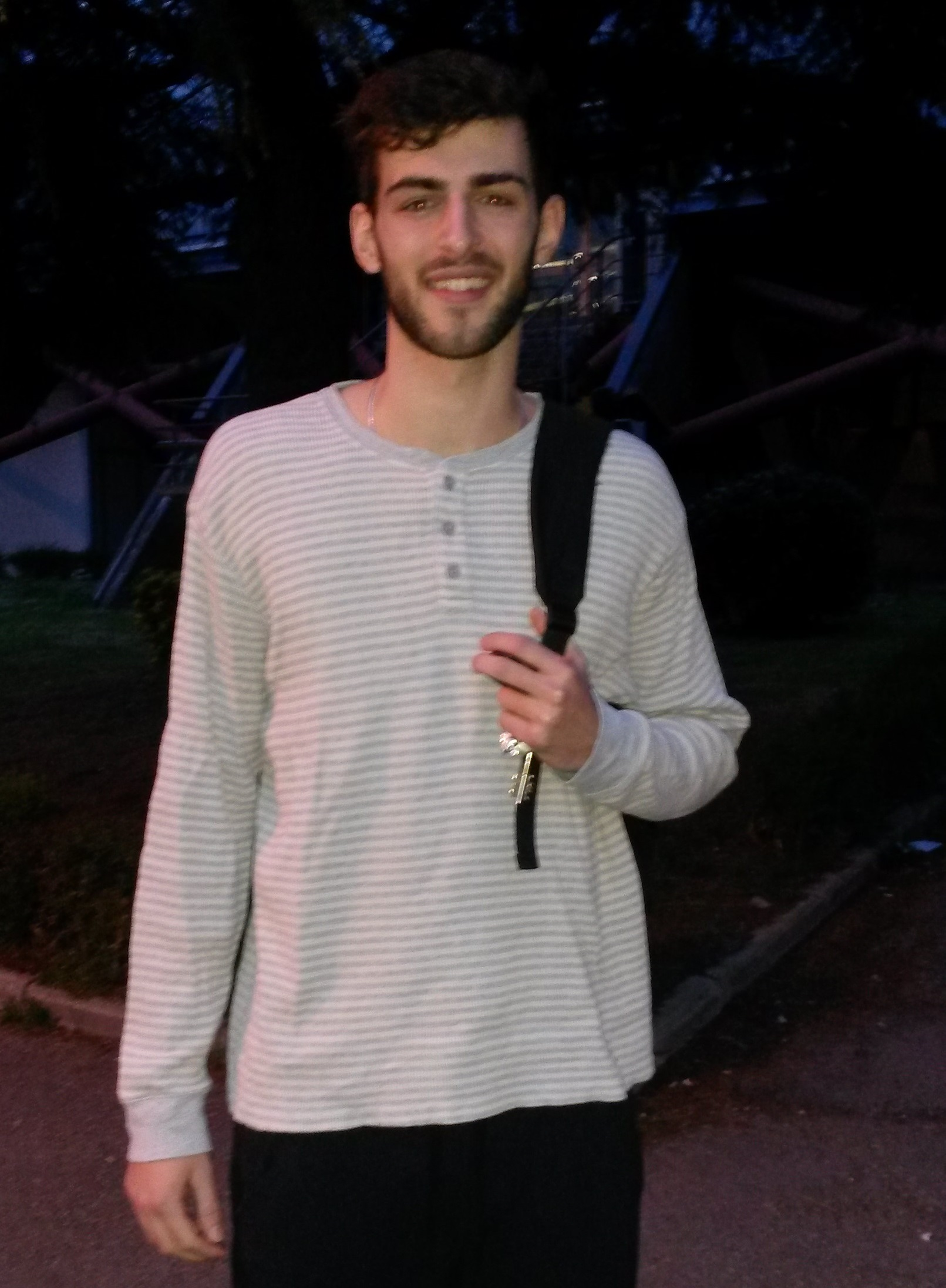
Aaron Russell

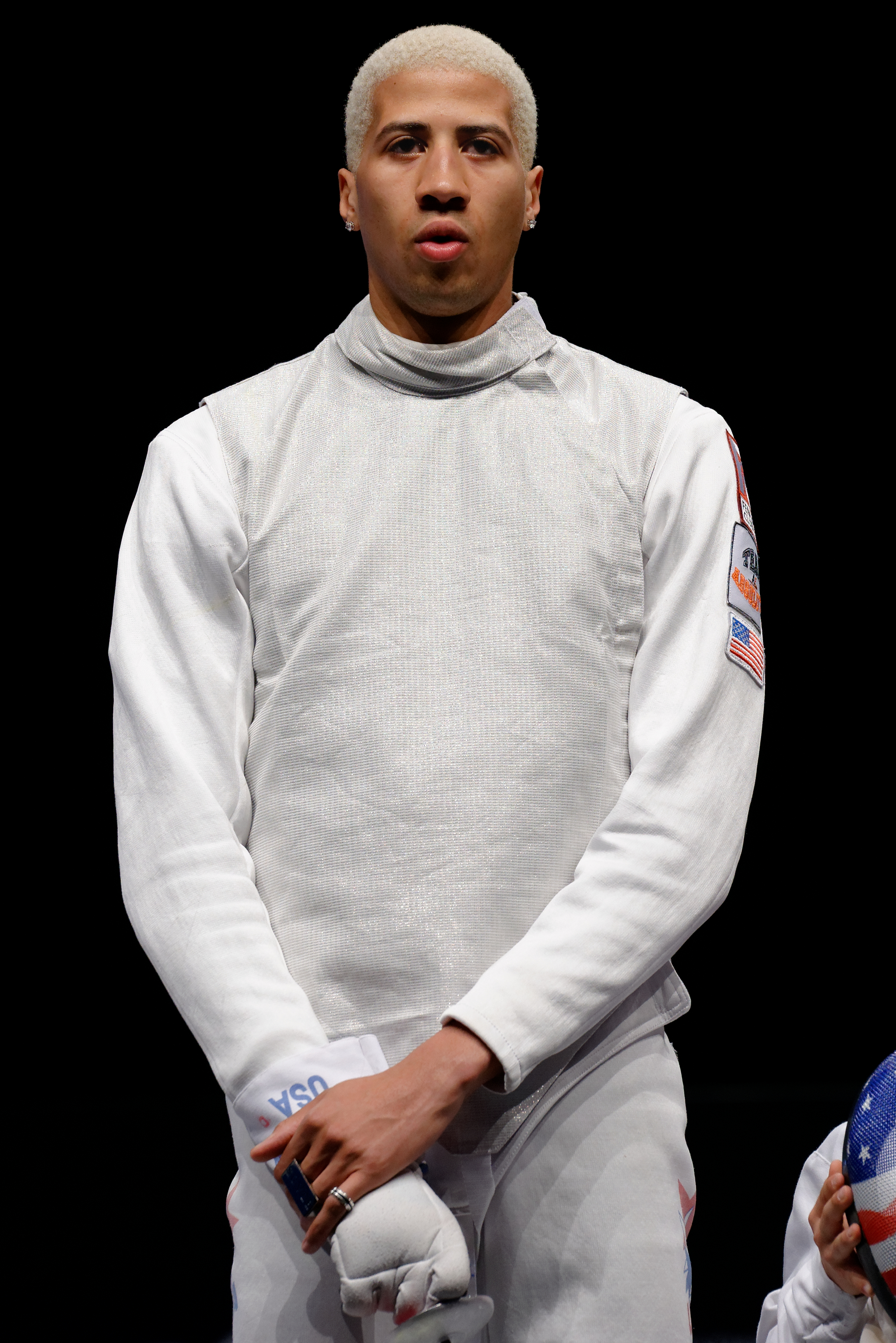
Miles Chamley-Watson

| Name | Sport | Medal (if app.) and event |
|---|---|---|
| (United States) Monica Aksamit | Fencing | (team saber) |
| (United States) Matt Anderson | Volleyball | (team) |
| (United States) Matt Baranoski | Cycling | |
| (United States) Amelia Bizer | Rugby | |
| (Brazil) Bia Bulcão | Fencing | |
| (United States) Miles Chamley-Watson | Fencing | (team foil) |
| (United States) Nicole Fawcett | Volleyball | |
| (United States) Alisha Glass | Volleyball | (team) |
| (Mexico) Daniel Gómez Tanamachi | Fencing | |
| (Mexico) Carlos Guerra | Volleyball | |
| (United States) Christa (Harmotto) Dietzen | Volleyball | (team) |
| (United States) Darrell Hill | Track and field | |
| (United States) Megan (Hodge) Easy | Volleyball | |
| (United States) Max Holt | Volleyball | (team) |
| (United States) Joe Kovacs | Track and field | (shot put) |
| (United States) Ali Krieger | Soccer | |
| (United States) Bobby Lea | Cycling | |
| (United States Virgin Islands) Eddie Lovett | Track and field | |
| (United States) Frank Molinaro | Wrestling | |
| (United States) Alyssa Naeher | Soccer | |
| (United States) Aaron Russell | Volleyball | (team) |
| (Republic of Ireland) Shane Ryan | Swimming | |
| (United States) Katarzyna Trzopek | Fencing | |

=== 2020 ===
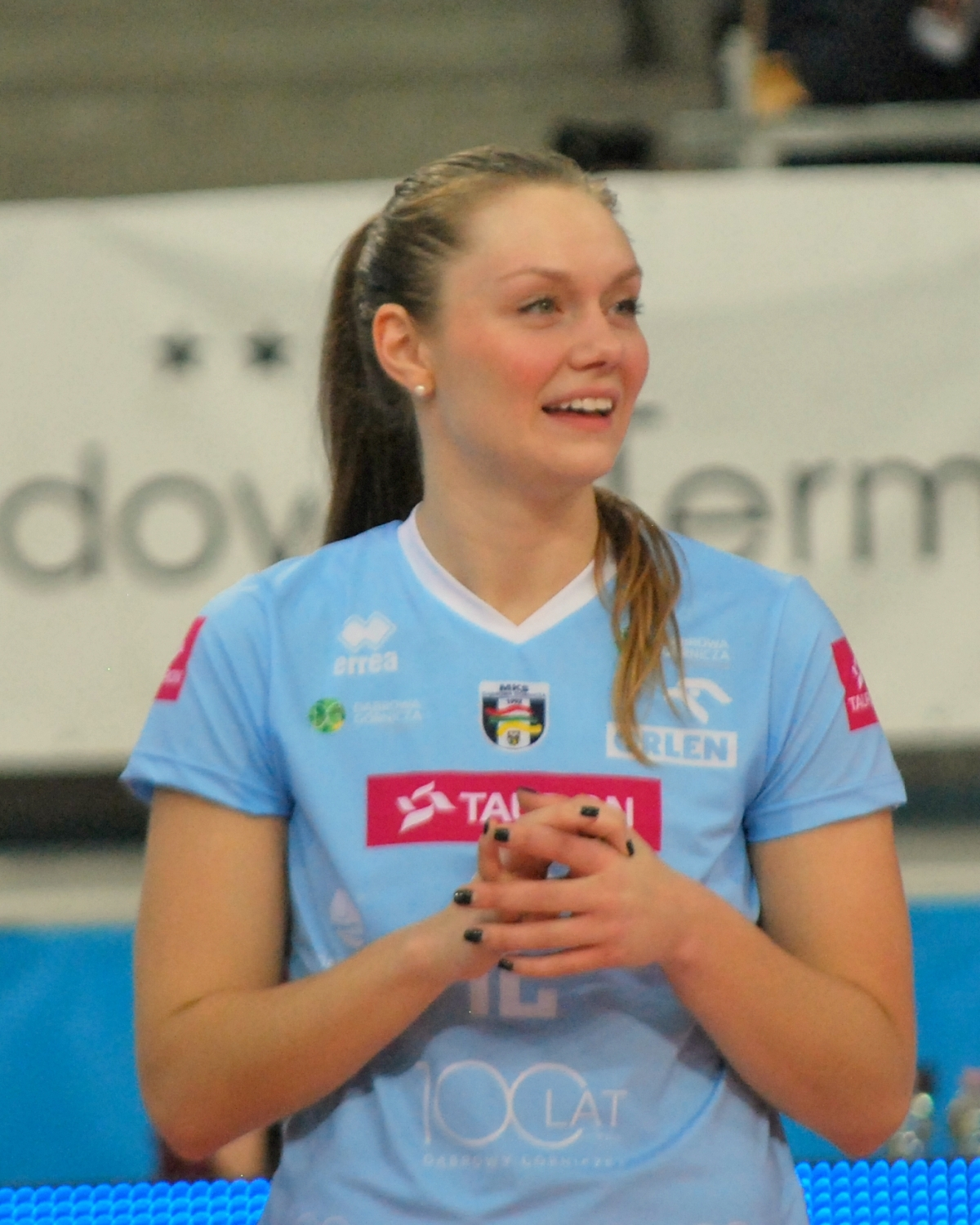
Micha Hancock

(Japan) Tokyo

| Name | Sport | Medal (if app.) and event |
|---|---|---|
| (United States) Matt Anderson | Volleyball | |
| (United States) Kayla Cannett-Oca | Rugby | |
| (Mexico) Gabe Castaño | Swimming | |
| (Chile) Eduardo Cisternas | Swimming | |
| (United States) Micha Hancock | Volleyball | (women's team) |
| (Egypt) Mohamed Hassan | Fencing | |
| (United States) Maxwell Holt | Volleyball | |
| (Poland) Renata Knapik-Miazga | Fencing | |
| (United States) Joe Kovacs | Track and field | (men's shot put) |
| (United States Virgin Islands) Eddie Lovett | Track and field | |
| (United States) Andrew Mackiewicz | Fencing | |
| (Canada) Erin McLeod | Soccer | (women's team) |
| (United States) Alyssa Naeher | Soccer | (women's team) |
| (Mexico) Melissa Rodríguez | Swimming | |
| (United States) Aaron Russell | Volleyball | |
| (Republic of Ireland) Shane Ryan | Swimming | |
| (United States) Michael Shuey | Track and field | |
| (Japan) Kaito Streets | Fencing | |
| (United States) David Taylor | Wrestling | (men's freestyle 86 kg) |
| (United States) Khalil Thompson | Fencing | |
| (United States) Haleigh Washington | Volleyball | (women's team) |

=== 2022 ===
(China) Beijing

| Name | Sport | Medal (if app.) and event |
|---|---|---|
| (Sweden) Jessica Adolfsson | Ice hockey | |
| (United States) Kaitlin Hawayek | Ice dancing | |

=== 2024 ===
(France) Paris

| Name | Sport | Medal (if app.) and event |
|---|---|---|
| (United States) Matt Anderson | Volleyball | (men's team) |
| (Mexico) Roman Bravo-Young | Wrestling | |
| (United States) Aaron Brooks | Wrestling | (men's freestyle 86 kg) |
| (Haiti) Lynzee Brown | Gymnastics | |
| (United States) Kayla Canett | Rugby | (women's team) |
| (Mexico) Gabe Castaño | Swimming | |
| (Philippines) Samantha Catantan | Fencing | |
| (United States) Miles Chamley-Watson | Fencing | |
| (Mali) Mohamed Cisset | Soccer | |
| (Chile) Eduardo Cisternas | Swimming | |
| (United States) Sam Coffey | Soccer | (women's team) |
| (United States) Ali Frantti | Volleyball | |
| (Germany) Laura Freigang | Soccer | (women's team) |
| (United States) Sophia Gladieux | Field hockey | |
| (Canada) Shaul Gordon | Fencing | |
| (United States) Micha Hancock | Volleyball | (women's team) |
| (Bermuda) Emma Harvey | Swimming | |
| (Bermuda) Jack Harvey | Swimming | |
| (United States) Alexis Holmes | Track and field | (women's 4x400m relay) |
| (United States) Maxwell Holt | Volleyball | (men's team) |
| (Poland) Renata Knapik-Miazga | Fencing | |
| (United States) Joe Kovacs | Track and field | (men's shot put) |
| (Brazil) Eduardo Moraes | Swimming | |
| (United States) Alyssa Naeher | Soccer | (women's team) |
| (United States) Stephen Nedoroscik | Gymnastics | (men's team) (pommel horse) |
| (United States) Zain Retherford | Wrestling | |
| (United States) Jenny Rizzo | Field hockey | |
| (Saint Vincent and the Grenadines) Handal Roban | Track and field | |
| (Mexico) Melissa Rodriguez | Swimming | |
| (United States) Aaron Russell | Volleyball | (men's team) |
| (Republic of Ireland) Shane Ryan | Swimming | |
| (Ivory Coast) Cheickna Traore | Track and Field | |
| (Italy) Margherita Guzzi Vincenti | Fencing | |
| (United States) Haleigh Washington | Volleyball | (women's team) |
| (Egypt) Mohamed Yasseen | Fencing | |
| (Canada) Sam Zakutney | Gymnastics | |

=== 2026 ===
(Italy) Milan–Cortina

| Name | Sport | Medal (if app.) and event |
|---|---|---|
| (Sweden) Jessica Adolfsson | Ice hockey | |
| (Italy) Matilde Fantin | Ice hockey | |
| (Sweden) Nicole Hall | Ice hockey | |
| (United States) Tessa Janecke | Ice hockey | (women’s team) |

== Paralympic Games ==
=== 1984 ===
(United States) / (United Kingdom) Long Island (USA)/Stoke Mandeville (UK)

| Name | Sport | Medal (if app.) and event |
|---|---|---|
| (United States) Kevin Szott | Track and field | Men's shot put B3; Men's discus B3; Men's javelin B3 |
| (United States) Kevin Szott | Goalball | Men's team |
| (United States) Kevin Szott | Wrestling | classification not recorded |

=== 1996 ===
(United States) Atlanta

| Name | Sport | Medal (if app.) and event |
|---|---|---|
| (United States) Kevin Szott | Judo | Men's +95kg |
| (United States) Kevin Szott | Track and field | Men's shot put F12; Men's discus F12 |

=== 2000 ===
(Australia) Sydney

| Name | Sport | Medal (if app.) and event |
|---|---|---|
| (United States) Kevin Szott | Judo | Men's +100kg |

=== 2004 ===
(Greece) Athens

| Name | Sport | Medal (if app.) and event |
|---|---|---|
| (United States) Jeffrey Hantz | Track and field | Men's discus F56, javelin F55-56 |
| (United States) Kevin Szott | Judo | Men's – 100kg |

=== 2008 ===
(China) Beijing

| Name | Sport | Medal (if app.) and event |
|---|---|---|
| (United States) Rebecca Hart | Equestrian | Team open |
| (United States) Rebecca Hart | Equestrian | Individual freestyle - Grade II (<2017) - open |
| (United States) Rebecca Hart | Equestrian | Individual championship test - Grade II (<2017) |
| (United States) Maggie Redden | Track and field | Women's 100m T53, 200m T53 |

=== 2012 ===
(United Kingdom) London

| Name | Sport | Medal (if app.) and event |
|---|---|---|
| (United States) Rebecca Hart | Equestrian | Team open |
| (United States) Rebecca Hart | Equestrian | Individual freestyle - Grade II (<2017) - open |
| (United States) Rebecca Hart | Equestrian | Individual championship test - Grade II (<2017) |

=== 2016 ===
(Brazil) Rio de Janeiro

| Name | Sport | Medal (if app.) and event |
|---|---|---|
| (United States) Rebecca Hart | Equestrian | Team open |
| (United States) Rebecca Hart | Equestrian | Individual freestyle - Grade II (<2017) - open |
| (United States) Rebecca Hart | Equestrian | Individual championship test - Grade II (<2017) |
| (United States) Shawn Morelli | Track cycling | Women's 3000m individual pursuit C4 |
| (United States) Shawn Morelli | Road cycling | Women's time trial C4; Road race C4-5 |
| (United States) Emily Frederick | Track and field | Women's shot put F40 |

=== 2020 ===
(Japan) Tokyo

| Name | Sport | Medal (if app.) and event |
|---|---|---|
| (United States) Rebecca Hart | Equestrian | Team open |
| (United States) Rebecca Hart | Equestrian | Individual Championship Test - Grade III - Open |
| (United States) Shawn Morelli | Track cycling | Women's 3000m individual pursuit C4 |
| (United States) Shawn Morelli | Road cycling | Women's time trial C4 |
| (United States) Shawn Morelli | Road cycling | Women's road race C4-5 |
| (United States) Jacob Schrom | Powerlifting | Men's - 107 kg |

=== 2024 ===
(France) Paris

| Name | Sport | Medal (if app.) and event |
|---|---|---|
| (United States) Rebecca Hart | Equestrian | Team open |
| (United States) Rebecca Hart | Equestrian | Individual championship test - Grade III - open |
| (United States) Rebecca Hart | Equestrian | Individual freestyle event - Grade III |
| (United States) Shawn Morelli | Track cycling | Women's 3000m individual pursuit C4 |
| (United States) Shawn Morelli | Track cycling | Women’s 500m time trial C4-5 |
| (United States) Shawn Morelli | Road cycling | Women's time trial C4 |
| (United States) Shawn Morelli | Road cycling | Women's road race C4-5 |
| (United States) Brandon Lyons | Road cycling | Men's time trial H3 |
| (United States) Brandon Lyons | Road cycling | Men's road race H3 |
| (United States) Brandon Lyons | Road cycling | Mixed H1-5 team relay (did not compete in bronze medal result) |

== See also ==
- List of American universities with Olympic medals
- List of Pennsylvania State University people
- Penn State Nittany Lions
