= Judo at the 2004 Summer Paralympics – Men's 100 kg =

Judo competition

Judo - Men's up to 100 kg at the XII Paralympic Games
- Paralympic Judo
- Venue: Ano Liossia Olympic Hall
- Dates: 20 September 2004
- Competitors: 12 from 12 nations

Medalists
1st place, gold medalist(s)		Antonio Tenorio	Brazil
2nd place, silver medalist(s)		Men Run Ming	China
3rd place, bronze medalist(s)		Sebastien Le Meaux	France
3rd place, bronze medalist(s)		Kevin Szott	United States

The men's up to 100 kg judo competition at the 2004 Summer Paralympics was held on 20 September at the Ano Liossia Olympic Hall.

The tournament bracket consisted of a single-elimination contest culminating in a gold medal match. There was also a repechage to determine the winners of the two bronze medals. Each judoka who had lost to a semifinalist competed in the repechage. The two judokas who lost in the semifinals faced the winner of the opposite half of the bracket's repechage in bronze medal bouts.

The event was won by Antonio Tenorio, representing Brazil.

== Results ==
The four digits represent scores of ippon, waza-ari, yuko and koka (which was still used at the time). A letter indicates a penalty of shido, chui, keikoku or hansoku make, which (at the time) also registered a score of koka, yuko, waza-ari or ippon, respectively, to the opponent. Penalties are escalated, thus 2 shido = chui, 3 shido = keikoku, 4 shido = hansoku make, save that a penalty of hansoku make direct results in exclusion from the remainder of the competition, while if it results from escalation it does not.

=== Competition bracket ===
Round of 16
Sebastien Le Meaux (FRA)	0001C
Antonio Tenorio (BRA)	0011S
Yoshikazu Matsumoto (JPN)	0001C
Kevin Szott (USA)	0011
Thomas Dahmen (GER)	0020
Williams Montero (VEN)	0000C
Reza Arshad Hokmabad (IRI)	0001C
Men Run Ming (CHN)	0110S

Quarterfinals
Antonio Tenorio (BRA)	1001
Mykola Lyvytskyy (UKR)	0000S
Theoklitos Papachristos (GRE)	0010H
Kevin Szott (USA)	1000C
Thomas Dahmen (GER)	1000
Grigory Shneyderman (RUS)	0000
Rafael Moreno (ESP)	0010S
Men Run Ming (CHN)	1001C

Semifinals
Antonio Tenorio (BRA)	1000
Kevin Szott (USA)	0000
Thomas Dahmen (GER)	0001S
Men Run Ming (CHN)	1001S

Final
Antonio Tenorio (BRA)	0100
Men Run Ming (CHN)	0000K

=== Repechage ===
First round
Sebastien Le Meaux (FRA)	0100C
Mykola Lyvytskyy (UKR)	0010K
Yoshikazu Matsumoto (JPN)	0001S
Theoklitos Papachristos (GRE)	1001S
Williams Montero (VEN)	0000
Grigory Shneyderman (RUS)	1000
Reza Arshad Hokmabad (IRI)	1000
Rafael Moreno (ESP)	0000

Second round
Sebastien Le Meaux (FRA)	0110S
Theoklitos Papachristos (GRE)	0101K
Grigory Shneyderman (RUS)	0201S
Reza Arshad Hokmabad (IRI)	0001S

Bronze medal matches
Sebastien Le Meaux (FRA)	1000
Thomas Dahmen (GER)	0000
Grigory Shneyderman (RUS)	0000
Kevin Szott (USA)	0001
