= Janine Gray =

British actress (1940–2022)

- Born: Janine Catherine Glass; 14 January 1940; Bombay, British India
- Died: 6 April 2022 (aged 82); Cape Town, South Africa
- Occupation: Actress
- Years active: 1959–1969
- Spouses: Herman Goffberg (m. 1962; div. 1965) Brian Greaves (m. 1965)

Janine Gray (born Janine Catherine Glass; 14 January 1940 – 6 April 2022) was a British film and television actress.

== Early life and education ==
Janine Catherine Glass was born on 14 January 1940 in Bombay, where her father was stationed as an oil engineer, but returned to Britain with her family when she was five years old. She attended drama school for two years and started her acting career under the name Janine Glass. Apart from her time at drama school, she was educated at a convent school in Weybridge.

== Career ==
Gray started film work at the age of 12. Her first three films were It's Great to be Young, My Teenage Daughter, and The Extra Day - all from 1956.

As a teenager, she worked in repertory theatre in Worthing and Nottingham.

Gray's later film credits include Panic (1963); The Pumpkin Eater (1964); Quick, Before It Melts (1964); The Americanization of Emily (1964) and The Third Day (1965). She received publicity for appearing nude in The Americanization of Emily, in a role credited as "Nameless Broad Number One".

Gray appeared in numerous television shows of the 1960s, including The Man from U.N.C.L.E. as the femme fatale Angelique. As a teenager, she appeared in the German television programme The Vikings. She also appeared in episodes of Danger Man, The Saint, The Avengers, The Rat Patrol, Get Smart, Bewitched (as Abigail Beecham, Samantha's father's glamorous private secretary), Twelve O'Clock High, The Loner, The Wild Wild West, and Hogan's Heroes. She was one of the presenters on Six-Five Special and on Double Your Money.

== Personal life ==
Gray married Herman Goffberg, an American automobile executive and former Olympic 10,000-metre runner. The couple divorced after a few years.

Gray married again in 1965. She later lived in Cape Town, South Africa with her husband, Dr. Brian Greaves (eye surgeon). Gray died there on 6 April 2022, at the age of 82.
