= Ronald Coder =

American soccer player

Personal information
- Full name: Ronald T. Coder
- Date of birth: September 14, 1928 (age 98)
- Place of birth: United States
- Height: 6 ft 0 in (1.83 m)
- Position: Goalkeeper

Youth career
- Years: Team
- 1948–1950: Penn State

Ronald T. Coder (born September 14, 1928) is an American former soccer goalkeeper who was a member of the U.S. team at the 1956 Summer Olympics.

Coder grew up in Montgomery County, Pennsylvania, where he was a state champion high school track star. He entered Penn State University in 1947. Bill Jeffrey spotted Coder playing an intramural soccer game during Coder's sophomore year and recruited him into the school's soccer team. Coder and his teammates went on to win the 1950 and 1951 college championships.

Coder graduated in the spring of 1951, was commissioned as a second lieutenant in the United States Air Force and became a tanker pilot. In 1955, he joined the Armed Forces soccer team. As a result, he attended trials for the 1956 U.S. Olympic soccer team and was selected as the team's starting goalkeeper. Prior to the tournament in Melbourne, Australia, the U.S. toured the Far East. In a game in Hong Kong, Coder broke his ankle when kicked by an opposing team's forward and he did not play in the lone U.S. game, a 9–1 loss to Yugoslavia. Coder continued to serve in the Air Force, retiring as a lieutenant colonel. His son, Ron Coder later played football at Penn State and with the Seattle Seahawks.

== See also ==
- List of Pennsylvania State University Olympians
