= Kevin Szott =

American Paralymic athlete (born 1963)

Personal information
- Born: 14 April 1963 (age 63) Clifton, New Jersey, U.S.
- Occupation: Judoka

Sport
- Country: United States
- Sport: Paralympic judo; Paralympic athletics; Paralympic goalball
- Disability: Retinitis pigmentosa
Medal record
Paralympic Games
Representing United States
Paralympic judo
Gold medal – first place	2000 Sydney	+100kg
Silver medal – second place	1996 Atlanta	+95kg
Bronze medal – third place	2004 Athens	-100kg
Paralympic athletics
Silver medal – second place	1984 Stoke Mandeville/New York	shot put B3
Paralympic goalball
Gold medal – first place	1984 Stoke Mandeville/New York	goalball

Kevin Szott (born April 14, 1963) is an American Paralympic judoka, former goalball player, shot put thrower and football offensive lineman. He is the older brother of Dave Szott who he played American football with while they were growing up, Kevin played for St Lawrence University as an offensive lineman in 1982 and was a strength coach for the Penn State Nittany Lions football team. He received a master's degree from Penn State in exercise physiology in 1989.

== Summer Paralympics ==
Games	Sport	Medal (if app.) and event
1984 Long Island	Athletics	Men's shot put B3; Men's discus B3; Men's javelin B3
1984 Long Island	Goalball	Men's team
1984 Long Island	Wrestling	classification not recorded
1996 Atlanta	Judo	Men's +95kg
1996 Atlanta	Athletics	Men's shot put F12; Men's discus F12

== See also ==
- List of Pennsylvania State University Olympians
