= Sarah Papp =

German chess player (born 1988)

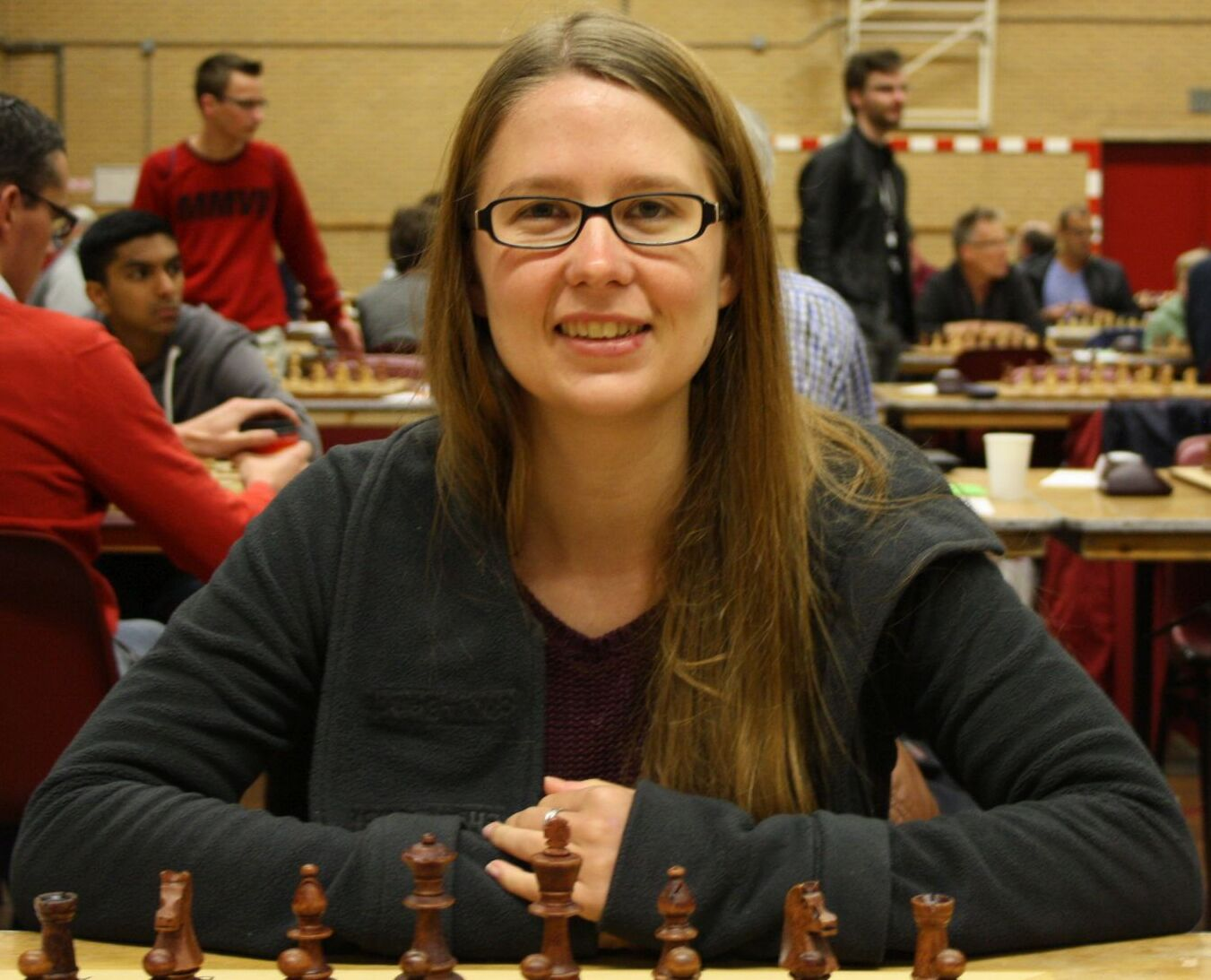
- Papp (née Hoolt) in 2016

Personal information
- Born: 30 April 1988 (age 38) Nordhorn, Germany
- Spouse: Gábor Papp (m. 2019)

Chess career
- Country: Germany
- Title: International Master (2024); Woman Grandmaster (2012)
- Peak rating: 2449 (August 2017)

Sarah Papp (née Hoolt, born 30 April 1988) is a German chess player who holds the FIDE titles of Woman Grandmaster and International Master. She married Hungarian Grandmaster Gábor Papp in September 2019.

== Chess career ==
From 2001 to 2006, Hoolt participated in German Girls' Championships and won this tournament in 2006 (age category U18). From 2004 to 2008 she participated in European Youth Chess Championships and World Youth Chess Championships. In 2011 in Bonn Sarah Hoolt won German Women's Championship.

She played for Germany in Women's Chess Olympiads:

- In 2008, at reserve board in the 38th Chess Olympiad (women) in Dresden (+0, =2, -3),
- In 2010, at second board in the 39th Chess Olympiad (women) in Khanty-Mansiysk (+1, =4, -3),
- In 2014, at reserve board in the 41st Chess Olympiad (women) in Tromsø (+6, =2, -2).

Hoolt played for Germany in European Team Chess Championship:

- In 2011, at reserve board in the 9th European Team Chess Championship (women) in Porto Carras (+2, =0, -5).

She received the Woman International Master (WIM) title in 2008 and the Woman Grandmaster (WGM) title in September 2012.

== FIDE ratings ==
Elo development
View chart definition.
