= Ron Coder =

American football player (born 1954)

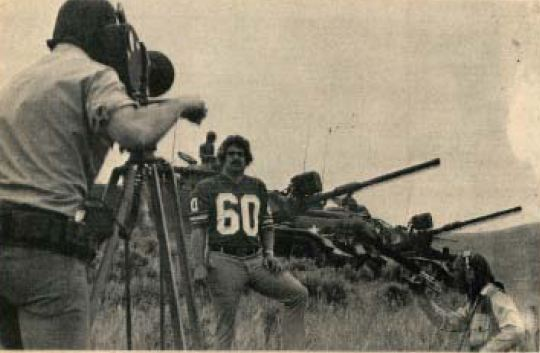
- Seattle Seahawks offensive guard Ron Coder while filming a 1978 public service announcement for the Washington Army National Guard.

No. 60, 61
- Position: Guard

Personal information
- Born: May 24, 1954 (age 72); Savannah, Georgia, U.S.
- Listed height: 6 ft 4 in (1.93 m)
- Listed weight: 250 lb (113 kg)

Career information
- High school: Yamato
- College: Penn State
- NFL draft: 1976: 3rd round, 70th overall pick

Career history
- Seattle Seahawks (1976–1979); St. Louis Cardinals (1980)

Career NFL statistics
- Games played: 53
- Games started: 21
- Fumble recoveries: 2
- Stats at Pro Football Reference

Ronald William Coder (born May 24, 1954) is an American former professional football player who played in five National Football League (NFL) seasons from 1976 to 1980 for the Seattle Seahawks and St. Louis Cardinals. He was head coach of the Pittsburgh Passion of the Independent Women's Football League. He was born in Savannah, Georgia. Coder graduated in 1972 from Yamato High School in Japan, where his father Ronald Coder, also an athlete, was then stationed as an Air Force pilot.

As of April 23, 2013, Coder assumed the role of head coach of Canon McMillian Senior High School's football team.
