= Gábor Papp =

Hungarian chess grandmaster (born 1987)

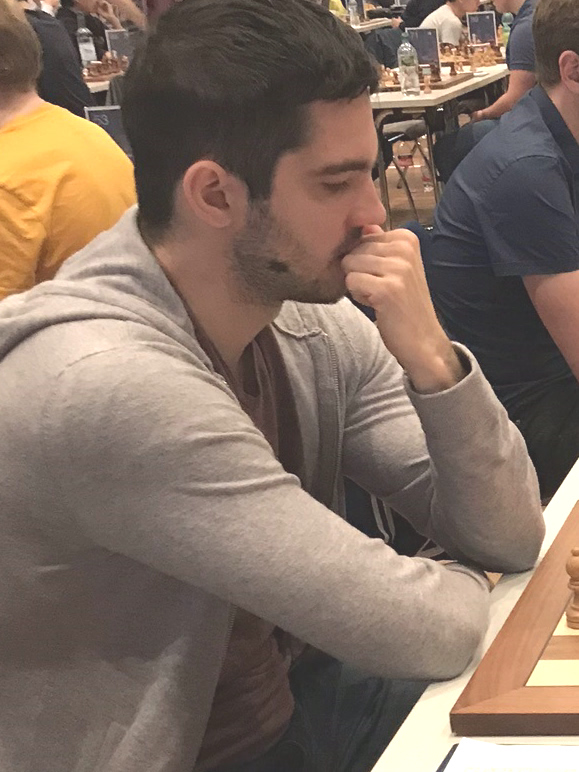
- Papp in 2019

Personal information
- Born: May 4, 1987 (age 39) Pécs, Hungary
- Spouse: Sarah Hoolt (m. 2019)

Chess career
- Country: Hungary
- Title: Grandmaster (2011)
- FIDE rating: 2507 (July 2026)
- Peak rating: 2614 (April 2018)

Gábor Papp is a Hungarian chess grandmaster.

== Chess career ==
In November 2008, he tied for 1st–3rd with grandmasters Róbert Ruck and Kaido Külaots at the 1st Gedeon Barcza Memorial. He finished in second place after tiebreaks.

In 2011, he was awarded the Grandmaster title, after having achieved his norms at the:

- 24e open international de Cappelle in February 2008
- Mitropacup 2010 in June 2010
- International Tournament Zadar Open 2010 Group A in January 2011

In July 2016, he won the 44th World Open chess tournament after having the best tiebreak score of the seven grandmasters who tied for first place.

== Personal life ==
In September 2019, he married German chess player Sarah Hoolt.
