= Grigory Shneyderman =

Russian judoka

Personal information
- Full name: Grigoriy Borisovich Shneyderman
- Nationality: Russian
- Born: 7 July 1953 (age 72) Tula, Soviet Union
- Occupation: Judoka

Sport
- Sport: Para judo
Medal record
Para judo
Representing Russia
Paralympic Games
Silver medal – second place	2000 Sydney	Men's 100kg

Profile at external databases
- JudoInside.com: 89860

Grigory Borisovich Shneyderman (born 7 July 1953 in Tula, USSR) is a Russian para judoka.

In 2000, he won the silver medal in the men's -100 kg event. In 2004, he competed in the same event.
