= Julien Taurines =

French retired Paralympic judoka

Personal information
- Born: 23 July 1978 (age 47) Montpellier, France
- Height: 1.83 m (6 ft 0 in)

Sport
- Country: France
- Sport: Paralympic judo
- Disability: Retinitis pigmentosa
- Retired: 2016
Medal record
Paralympic judo
Representing France
Paralympic Games
Bronze medal – third place	2008 Beijing	Men's +100kg
World Championships
Bronze medal – third place	2006 Brommat	Men's +100kg
European Championships
Silver medal – second place	2005 Vlaardingen	Men's +100kg
Silver medal – second place	2011 Crawley	Men's +100kg
Bronze medal – third place	2013 Eger	Men's +100kg

Julien Taurines (born 23 July 1978) is a French retired Paralympic judoka who competed at international judo competitions. He is a Paralympic bronze medalist, World bronze medalist and two-time European silver medalist.
