= Herman Goffberg =

American long-distance runner

Herman Goffberg (25 June 1921 – 17 August 2001) was an American long-distance runner who competed in the 1948 Summer Olympics.

== See also ==
- List of Pennsylvania State University Olympians
