= Rafael Moreno (judoka) =

Spanish retired Paralympic judoka

Personal information
- Full name: Rafael Moreno López
- Born: 25 August 1966 (age 59) Málaga, Spain
- Occupation: Judoka

Sport
- Country: Spain
- Sport: Paralympic judo
- Retired: 2009
Medal record
Paralympic judo
Representing Spain
Paralympic Games
Silver medal – second place	2000 Sydney	+100kg
World Championships
Bronze medal – third place	2002 Brommat	+100kg
European Championships
Gold medal – first place	1999 Mittersill	Team
Silver medal – second place	2001 Ufa	Team
Bronze medal – third place	1999 Mittersill	+100kg
Bronze medal – third place	2001 Ufa	+100kg

Rafael Moreno López (born 25 August 1966) is a Spanish retired Paralympic judoka who competed in international judo competitions. He won a silver medal at the 2000 Summer Paralympics, he is also a World bronze medalist and is a four-time European medalist.
