= Argentina at the 2020 Summer Paralympics =

- IPC code: ARG
- NPC: Argentine Paralympic Committee

in Tokyo, Japan August 24, 2021 – September 5, 2021
- Competitors: 55 in 11 sports
- Medals Ranked 63rd: Gold 0 Silver 5 Bronze 4 Total 9

Summer Paralympics appearances (overview)
- 1960; 1964; 1968; 1972; 1976; 1980; 1984; 1988; 1992; 1996; 2000; 2004; 2008; 2012; 2016; 2020; 2024

Argentina competed in the 2020 Summer Paralympics in Tokyo, Japan from 24 August to 5 September 2021.

== Medalists ==
Medal	Name	Sport	Event	Date
Silver	Pipo Carlomagno	Swimming	Men's 100 metre backstroke S7	30 August
Silver	Brian Lionel Impellizzeri	Athletics	Men's long jump T37	2 September
Silver	Hernán Emanuel Urra	Athletics	Men's shot put F35	2 September
Silver	Matías de Andrade	Swimming	Men's 100 metre backstroke S6	3 September
Silver	Argentina men's national football 5-a-side team: Darío Lencina; Ángel Deldo Carcia; Federico Accardi; Froilán Padilla; Maximiliano Espinillo; Marcelo Panizza; Brian Pereyra; Nicolás Véliz; Germán Muleck; Nahuel Heredia	Football 5-a-side	Men's tournament	September 4
Bronze	Antonella Ruiz Diaz	Athletics	Women's shot put F41	27 August
Bronze	Yanina Martínez	Athletics	Women's 200 metres T36	29 August
Bronze	Juan Samorano	Taekwondo	Men's 75 kg	3 September
Bronze	Alexis Sebastian Chavez	Athletics	Men's 100 metres T36	4 September

== Competitors ==
The following is the list of number of competitors participating in the Games:

Sport	Men	Women	Total
Athletics	6	6	12
Boccia	3	2	5
Cycling	2	1	3
Football 5-a-side	8	0	8
Judo	2	1	3
Paracanoe	2	0	2
Rowing	0	1	1
Swimming	6	4	10
Table tennis	3	2	5
Taekwondo	1	0	1
Wheelchair tennis	3	1	4
Total	37	18	55

== Athletics ==
Hernan Emanuel Urra and Yanina Martínez are among the athletes to represent Argentina at the 2020 Summer Paralympics.

Men's track

Athlete	Event	Heats		Final	
Athlete	Event	Result	Rank	Result	Rank
Hernan Barreto	100m T35	—N/a		12.59	6
Hernan Barreto	200m T35	—N/a		26.07	5
Alexis Sebastian Chavez	100m T36	11.91	3 Q	12.02	Bronze medal
Alexis Sebastian Chavez	400m T36	—N/a		55.14	4
Brian Lionel Impellizzeri	100m T37	12.56	11	Did not advance	
Gabriel Immanuel Sosa	100m T54	15.08	16	Did not advance	

Men's field

Athlete	Event	Final	
Athlete	Event	Result	Rank
Brian Lionel Impellizzeri	Long jump T37	6.44	Silver medal
Pablo Damian Gimenez Reinoso	Shot put F57	12.17	8
Pablo Damian Gimenez Reinoso	Javelin throw F57	34.25	9
Hernan Emanuel Urra	Shot put F35	15.90	Silver medal

Women's track

Athlete	Event	Heats		Final	
Athlete	Event	Result	Rank	Result	Rank
Aldana Isabel Ibanez	100m T47	13.78	16	Did not advance	
Yanina Andrea Martinez	100m T36	14.60	4 Q	14.65	4
Yanina Andrea Martinez	200m T36	30.97	3 Q	30.96	Bronze medal

Women's field

Athlete	Event	Final	
Athlete	Event	Result	Rank
Mahira Daniela Bergallo Brzezicki	Shot put F35	7.76	7
Marilu Romina Fernandez	Shot put F32	4.41	7
Marilu Romina Fernandez	Club throw F32	19.71	5
Isabel Aldana Ibanez	Long jump T47	4.86	10
Florencia Belen Romero	Shot put F12	8.23	11
Florencia Belen Romero	Discus throw F11	29.07	9
Antonella Ruiz Diaz	Shot put F41	9.50	Bronze medal
Antonella Ruiz Diaz	Discus throw F41	21.42	9

== Boccia ==
Argentina get in BC1, BC2 & Individual BC3 events.

Athlete	Event	Pool matches					Quarterfinals	Semifinals	Final / BM	
Athlete	Event	Opposition Score	Opposition Score	Opposition Score	Opposition Score	Rank	Opposition Score	Opposition Score	Opposition Score	Rank
Mauricio Ibarbure	Mixed individual BC1	Nakamura (JPN) L 5–8	Smith (GBR) L 3–4	Qi (CHN) L 1–5	Sanchez (MEX) W 5–4	5	Did not advance			
Jonathan Aquino	Mixed individual BC2	Kozmin (RPC) L 2–3	Yan (CHN) W 6–0	Lan (CHN) L 3–4	N/A	3	Did not advance			
Luis Cristaldo	Mixed individual BC2	Tagart (GBR) W 5–2	Santos (BRA) L 1–6	Lee (KOR) W 6–0	N/A	2	Did not advance			
Stefania Ferrando	Mixed individual BC3	Cotie (AUS) L 1–4	McCowan (GBR) L 1–6	McCowan (GBR) W 2*–2	N/A	3	Did not advance			
Jonathan Aquino; Luis Cristaldo; Ailen Flores; Mauricio Ibarbure	Mixed team BC1/BC2	Thailand (THA) L 2–11	RPC (RPC) L 7–7*	China (CHN) L 1–8	Great Britain L 4–6	5	Did not advance			

== Cycling ==
Argentina sent one male cyclist after successfully getting a slot in the 2018 UCI Nations Ranking Allocation quota for the Americas.

=== Road ===
Men's road

Athlete	Event	Time	Rank
Maximiliano Ramon Gomez	Road race B	-1 LAP	6
Maximiliano Ramon Gomez	Time trial B	46:59.35	5
Rodrigo Fernando Lopez	Road race C1–3	-2 LAP	36
Rodrigo Fernando Lopez	Time trial C1	30:01.61	9

Women's road

Athlete	Event	Time	Rank
Mariela Delgado	Road race C4–5	2:31:14	7
Mariela Delgado	Time trial C5	43:19.82	7

=== Track ===
Men's track

Athlete	Event	Qualification		Final	
Athlete	Event	Time	Rank	Opposition Time	Rank
Maximiliano Ramon Gomez	Individual pursuit B	4:27.874	8	Did not advance	
Maximiliano Ramon Gomez	Time trial B	—N/a		1:05.178	7
Rodrigo Fernando Lopez	Individual pursuit C1	4:17.864	9	Did not advance	
Rodrigo Fernando Lopez	Time trial C1–3	—N/a		1:17.192	17

Women's track

Athlete	Event	Qualification		Final	
Athlete	Event	Time	Rank	Opposition Time	Rank
Mariela Delgado	Individual pursuit C5	4:07.960	7	Did not advance	
Mariela Delgado	Time trial C4–5	—N/a		38.892	9

== Football 5-a-side ==
Argentina secured a qualification slot in the 2019 Americas Regional Championships after being defeated by Brazil who are already qualified by winning at the 2018 IBSA World Blind Football Championship. The following is the Argentina squad in the football 5-a-side tournament of the 2020 Summer Paralympics.

No.	Pos.	Player	Class	Date of birth (age)
1	GK	Darío Lencina	Sighted	23 August 1980 (aged 41)
2	DF	Ángel Deldo	B1	1 October 1987 (aged 33)
3	DF	Federico Accardi	B1	26 June 1989 (aged 32)
4	DF	Froilán Padilla	B1	22 February 1979 (aged 42)
8	DF	Marcelo Panizza	B1	7 October 1983 (aged 37)
10		Braian Pereyra	B1	6 July 1993 (aged 28)
11	FW	Nicolás Véliz	B1	14 February 1991 (aged 30)
12	GK	Germán Muleck	Sighted	4 May 1990 (aged 31)
14	DF	Nahuel Heredia	B1	27 May 1995 (aged 26)
15	FW	Maximiliano Espinillo	B1	16 November 1993 (aged 27)

Team	Event	Group stage				Semifinal	Final / BM	
Team	Event	Opposition Score	Opposition Score	Opposition Score	Rank	Opposition Score	Opposition Score	Rank
Argentina men's	Men's tournament	MoroccoW 2–1	SpainW 2–0	ThailandW 3–0	3	ChinaW 2–0	BrazilL 0–1	Silver medal

== Judo ==
Three Argentine judoka have qualified to compete at the Games.

Men

Athlete	Event	Round of 16	Quarterfinals	Semifinals	Repechage round 1	Repechage round 2	Final/ Bronze medal contest	
Athlete	Event	Opposition Result	Opposition Result	Opposition Result	Opposition Result	Opposition Result	Opposition Result	Rank
Eduardo Gauto	-66kg	Seto (JPN); L 00–11	Did not advance					9
Rodolfo Ramirez	-73kg	Nagai (JPN); L 00–10	Did not advance					9

Women

Athlete	Event	Round of 16	Quarterfinals	Semifinals	Repechage	Final/ Bronze medal contest	
Athlete	Event	Opposition Result	Opposition Result	Opposition Result	Opposition Result	Opposition Result	Rank
Laura Gonzalez	-57kg	N/A	Araújo (BRA); L 00–10	Did not advance	Hirose (JPN); L 00–10	Did not advance	7

== Paracanoeing ==
Argentina has qualified two athletes.

Athlete	Event	Heats		Semifinal		Final	
Athlete	Event	Result	Rank	Result	Rank	Result	Rank
Emilio Ariel Atamanuk	Men's KL2	49.095	5 SF	45.316	4 FB	45.459	10
Emilio Ariel Atamanuk	Men's VL3	53.675	2 SF	52.106	4 FB	53.531	9
Lucas Nicolas Diaz	Men's KL1	57.033	5 SF	53.105	4 FB	54.345	10

== Rowing ==
Argentina qualified one boats in the women's single sculls events for the games by winning the silver medal at the 2021 FISA Americas Qualification Regatta in Rio de Janeiro, Brazil.

Athlete	Event	Heats		Repechage		Final	
Athlete	Event	Time	Rank	Time	Rank	Time	Rank
Brenda Sardon	Women's single sculls	13:09.17	3 R	12:01.15	3 FB	13:14.45	8

Qualification Legend: FA=Final A (medal); FB=Final B (non-medal); R=Repechage

== Swimming ==
Nine Argentina swimmer has successfully entered the paralympic slot after breaking the MQS.

Men

Athlete	Event	Heats		Final	
Athlete	Event	Result	Rank	Result	Rank
Inaki Basiloff	50m freestyle S7	30.27	11	Did not advance	
Inaki Basiloff	400m freestyle S7	4:46.17	3 Q	4:38.99	4
Inaki Basiloff	100m backstroke S7	1:15.43	8 Q	1:15.00	7
Inaki Basiloff	50m butterfly S7	30.96	7 Q	30.47	7
Inaki Basiloff	200m individual medley SM7	2:33.23	2 Q	2:31.62	4
Pipo Carlomagno	100m backstroke S7	1:09.12	1 Q	1:08.83	Silver medal
Pipo Carlomagno	100m breaststroke SB6	1:27.53	10	Did not advance	
Pipo Carlomagno	200m individual medley SM7	2:42.43	8 Q	2:41.55	8
Matias de Andrade	100m backstroke S6	1:14.38	2 Q	1:15.40	Silver medal
Matias de Andrade	50m butterfly S6	35.77	13	Did not advance	
Lautaro Daniel Maidana Cancinos	100m backstroke S14	1:05.50	15	Did not advance	
Lautaro Daniel Maidana Cancinos	100m butterfly S14	59.67	17	Did not advance	
Lucas Nicolas Poggi	100m backstroke S7	1:14.53	7 Q	1:15.22	8
Nicolas Rivero	100m breaststroke SB4	1:46:69	5 Q	1:46.52	6

Women

Athlete	Event	Heats		Final	
Athlete	Event	Result	Rank	Result	Rank
Nadia Baez	50m freestyle S11	34.11	12	Did not advance	
Nadia Baez	400m freestyle S11	DSQ		Did not advance	
Nadia Baez	100m breaststroke SB11	1:31.00	5 Q	1:30.77	5
Nadia Baez	200m individual medley SM11	3:22.90	12	Did not advance	
Daniela Gimenez	100m breaststroke SB9	1:18.88	3 Q	1:18.70	4
Daniela Gimenez	200m individual medley SM9	2:40.94	6 Q	2:39.60	8
Elizabeth Noriega	100m freestyle S5	1:35.46	12	Did not advance	
Elizabeth Noriega	200m freestyle S5	3:30.65	10	Did not advance	
Elizabeth Noriega	50m backstroke S5	50.70	12	Did not advance	
Analuz Pellitero	100m freestyle S12	1.09.11	9	Did not advance	
Analuz Pellitero	100m backstroke S12	N/A		1:17.78	7

== Table tennis ==
Argentina entered three athletes into the table tennis competition at the games. Gabriel Copola & Mauro Depergola qualified from 2019 Parapan American Games which was held in Lima, Peru and María Garrone via World Ranking allocation.

Men

Athlete	Event	Preliminary round			Round of 16	Quarterfinals	Semifinals	Final	
Athlete	Event	Opposition Result	Opposition Result	Rank	Opposition Result	Opposition Result	Opposition Result	Opposition Result	Rank
Fernando Eberhardt	Individual C1	Young-dae (KOR) L 0–3	Falco (ITA) L 2–3	3	Did not advance				
Gabriel Copola	Individual C3	Merrien (FRA) L 0–3	Laowong (THA) W 3–2	2 Q	Glinbancheun (THA) L 0–3	Did not advance			9
Mauro Depergola	Individual C5	Urhaug (NOR) L 0–3	Palikuća (SRB) L 0–3	3	Did not advance				
Gabriel Copola; Mauro Depergola; Fernando Eberhardt	Team C4-5	N/A			NigeriaL 1-2	Did not advance			9

Women

Athlete	Event	Group Stage				Quarterfinals	Semifinals	Final	
Athlete	Event	Opposition Result	Opposition Result	Opposition Result	Rank	Opposition Result	Opposition Result	Opposition Result	Rank
María Garrone	Individual C1-2	Rossi (ITA) L 1–3	Lafaye (FRA) W 3–0	N/A	2 Q	Jing (CHN) L 0–3	Did not advance		5
Veronica Soledad Blanco	Individual C3	Brunelli (ITA) L 0–3	Sigala (MEX) L 1–3	Mužinić (CRO) L 0–3	4	Did not advance			
María Garrone; Veronica Soledad Blanco	Team C1-3	N/A				ChinaL 0-2	Did not advance		5

== Taekwondo ==
Argentina qualified one athlete to compete at the Paralympics competition. Juan Eduardo Samorano will compete at men's –75 kg class by winning the gold medal at the 2020 Americas Qualification Tournament in San José, Costa Rica.

Athlete	Event	Round of 16	Quarterfinals	Semifinals	Repechage 2	Final / BM	
Athlete	Event	Opposition Result	Opposition Result	Opposition Result	Opposition Result	Opposition Result	Rank
Juan Samorano	Men's −75 kg	Shvets (UKR); W 52–20	Dombayev (KAZ); L 25–27	Did not advance	Kudo (JPN) W 42–22	Dombayev (KAZ); W 12–13	Bronze medal

== Wheelchair tennis ==
Argentina qualified four players entries for wheelchair tennis. Gustavo Fernandez qualified by winning the gold medal at the 2019 Parapan American Games in Lima, Peru. Meanwhile, three other athletes qualified by world rankings.

Athlete	Event	First Round	Second Round	Third Round	Quarterfinals	Semifinals	Final / BM	
Athlete	Event	Opposition Result	Opposition Result	Opposition Result	Opposition Result	Opposition Result	Opposition Result	Rank
Ezequiel Casco	Men's singles	Dunn (AUS) W 6–0, 6–0	Miki (JPN) L 3–6, 1–6	Did not advance				17
Gustavo Fernández	Men's singles	N/A	Tur (ESP) W 6–1, 6–0	Vandorpe (BEL) W 6–2, 6–1	Reid (GBR) L 5–7, 6–3, 1–6	Did not advance		5
Agustin Ledesma	Men's singles	de la Puente (ESP) L 1–6, 1–6	Did not advance					33
Maria Florencia Moreno	Women's singles	—N/a	Kamiji (JPN) L 0–6, 1–6	Did not advance				17

== See also ==
- Argentina at the Paralympics
- Argentina at the 2020 Summer Olympics
