= Judo at the 2020 Summer Paralympics – Men's 66 kg =

Judo – Men's 66 kg at the XVI Paralympic Games
- Venue: Nippon Budokan
- Date: 27 August 2021
- Competitors: 12 from 12 nations

Medalists
1st place, gold medalist(s)		Uchkun Kuranbaev	Uzbekistan
2nd place, silver medalist(s)		Sergio Ibáñez	Spain
3rd place, bronze medalist(s)		Yujiro Seto	Japan
3rd place, bronze medalist(s)		Namig Abasli	Azerbaijan

The men's 66 kg judo competition at the 2020 Summer Paralympics was held on 27 August 2021 at the Nippon Budokan.

== Results ==
=== Bracket ===
Round of 16
Aajimyn Mönkhbat (MGL)	10
Wayne Phipps (AUS)	00
Eduardo Gauto (ARG)	00
Yujiro Seto (JPN)	11
Sergio Ibáñez (ESP)	10
Luis Jabdiel Pérez (PUR)	00
Robert Tanaka (USA)	00
Viktor Rudenko (RPC)	10

Quarterfinals
Davyd Khorava (UKR)	11
Aajimyn Mönkhbat (MGL)	00
Uchkun Kuranbaev (UZB)	10
Yujiro Seto (JPN)	00
Namig Abasli (AZE)	00
Sergio Ibáñez (ESP)	01
Giorgi Gamjashvili (GEO)	11
Viktor Rudenko (RPC)	00

Semifinals
Davyd Khorava (UKR)	01
Uchkun Kuranbaev (UZB)	10
Sergio Ibáñez (ESP)	10
Giorgi Gamjashvili (GEO)	00

Final
Uchkun Kuranbaev (UZB)	01
Sergio Ibáñez (ESP)	00

=== Repechage ===
Repechage 2
Aajimyn Mönkhbat (MGL)	01
Yujiro Seto (JPN)	10

Bronze medal
Yujiro Seto (JPN)	11
Giorgi Gamjashvili (GEO)	01

Repechage 1
Luis Jabdiel Pérez (PUR)	00
Namig Abasli (AZE)	10

Repechage 2
Namig Abasli (AZE)	01
Viktor Rudenko (RPC)	00

Bronze medal
Namig Abasli (AZE)	01
Davyd Khorava (UKR)	00
