= Judo at the 2020 Summer Paralympics =

Judo Judo at the XVI Paralympic Games
- Venue: Nippon Budokan
- Location: Tokyo, Japan
- Dates: 27–29 August 2021
- Competitors: 136 from 41 nations

Competition at external databases
- Links: IJF • JudoInside

Para Judo at the 2020 Summer Paralympics in Tokyo took place at the Nippon Budokan from 27 to 29 August 2021. There were 138 qualified slots (80 male, 58 female) in 13 events: 7 male events and 6 female events.

The 2020 Summer Olympic and Paralympic Games were postponed to 2021 due to the COVID-19 pandemic. They kept the 2020 name and were held from 24 August to 5 September 2021.

== Qualification ==
A total of 138 athletes could qualify for judo at the 2021 Summer Paralympics. Each NPC could enter a maximum of 13 athletes, one per event, with the exception of Bipartite invitees. Qualification spots were allocated through one of four methods:

- Top ranked class B1 athletes (highest disability class) at the IBSA Judo 2020 Extended World Ranking.
- Top ranked athletes at the IBSA Judo 2020 Extended World Ranking without restrictions.
- Top ranked athlete from the host country in each event. If the slot is unused, it is allocated through the Bipartite Commission Invitation Allocation method.
- The IPC and IBSA Judo invite one athlete per event for a Bipartite Commission slot.

The number of qualification spots per method is as follow:

Method	Men							Women					
Method	60 kg	66 kg	73 kg	81 kg	90 kg	100 kg	+100 kg	48 kg	52 kg	57 kg	63 kg	70 kg	+70kg
B1 athletes	3	3	3	3	3	2	2	2	2	2	2	2	1
Ranking	7	7	7	7	7	6	6	6	6	6	6	6	5
Host country	1	1	1	1	1	1	1	1	1	1	1	1	1
Bipartite Commission Invitation	1	1	1	1	1	1	1	1	1	1	1	1	1
Total: 138 slots	12	12	12	12	12	10	10	10	10	10	10	10	8

== Competition schedule ==
Legend
Q	Elimination, Quarterfinal, Repechage & Semifinal	F	Bronze medal & Gold medal

M = Morning session, starting at 10:30 local time (01:30 UTC).
E = Evening session, starting at 19:00 local time (10:00 UTC).

Men
Date →	Aug 27		Aug 28		Aug 29	
Event ↓	M	E	M	E	M	E
60 kg	Q	F				
66 kg	Q	F				
73 kg			Q	F		
81 kg			Q	F		
90 kg					Q	F
100 kg					Q	F
+100 kg					Q	F

Women
Date →	Aug 27		Aug 28		Aug 29	
Event ↓	M	E	M	E	M	E
48 kg	Q	F				
52 kg	Q	F				
57 kg			Q	F		
63 kg			Q	F		
70 kg					Q	F
+70kg					Q	F

== Participating nations ==
A total of 136 athletes from 41 entered the paralympic games, according to the following table.

NPC	Men							Women						Total
NPC	60 kg	66 kg	73 kg	81 kg	90 kg	100 kg	+100 kg	48 kg	52 kg	57 kg	63 kg	70 kg	+70kg	Total
Algeria	Yes				Yes				Yes					3
Argentina		Yes	Yes							Yes				3
Australia		Yes												1
Azerbaijan	Yes	Yes	Yes	Yes		Yes	Yes	Yes	Yes	Yes	Yes		Yes	11
Belarus										Yes				1
Brazil	Yes			Yes	Yes	Yes	Yes		Yes	Yes		Yes	Yes	9
Canada									Yes					1
China								Yes			Yes			2
Chinese Taipei								Yes						1
Croatia												Yes		1
Cuba				Yes			Yes							2
France				Yes	Yes			Yes						3
Georgia	Yes	Yes	Yes				Yes					Yes		5
Germany			Yes			Yes		Yes	Yes					4
Great Britain				Yes	Yes	Yes	Yes							4
Greece												Yes		1
Iran					Yes		Yes							2
Italy												Yes	Yes	2
Jamaica							Yes							1
Japan	Yes	Yes	Yes	Yes	Yes	Yes	Yes	Yes	Yes	Yes	Yes	Yes	Yes	13
Kazakhstan	Yes		Yes	Yes	Yes	Yes				Yes			Yes	7
Kyrgyzstan										Yes				1
Lithuania			Yes											1
Mexico				Yes								Yes		2
Moldova					Yes	Yes								2
Mongolia	Yes	Yes											Yes	3
Peru				Yes										1
Portugal			Yes											1
Puerto Rico		Yes												1
Romania	Yes													1
RPC		Yes	Yes		Yes	Yes		Yes	Yes	Yes	Yes	Yes		9
South Korea				Yes			Yes							2
Spain		Yes	Yes								Yes			3
Sweden											Yes			1
Thailand									Yes					1
Turkey	Yes							Yes		Yes	Yes	Yes		5
Ukraine		Yes	Yes	Yes	Yes			Yes	Yes		Yes		Yes	8
United States		Yes				Yes					Yes		Yes	4
Uruguay	Yes													1
Uzbekistan	Yes	Yes	Yes	Yes	Yes	Yes	Yes			Yes	Yes	Yes		10
Venezuela	Yes				Yes									2
Total: 41 NPCs	12	12	12	12	12	10	10	9	9	10	10	10	8	136
References														

== Medal summary ==
=== Medal table ===
* Host nation (Japan)

Rank	NPC	Gold	Silver	Bronze	Total
1	Azerbaijan	6	0	2	8
2	Uzbekistan	2	2	2	6
3	Iran	2	0	0	2
4	Great Britain	1	1	0	2
5	Brazil	1	0	2	3
6	Algeria	1	0	0	1
7	Kazakhstan	0	3	0	3
8	Georgia	0	2	0	2
9	Ukraine	0	1	4	5
10	France	0	1	1	2
11	Canada	0	1	0	1
11	Spain	0	1	0	1
11	United States	0	1	0	1
14	RPC	0	0	3	3
15	Japan*	0	0	2	2
15	Mexico	0	0	2	2
15	South Korea	0	0	2	2
15	Turkey	0	0	2	2
19	China	0	0	1	1
19	Italy	0	0	1	1
19	Lithuania	0	0	1	1
19	Romania	0	0	1	1
Totals (22 entries)		13	13	26	52

=== Men's events ===
Event	Gold	Silver	Bronze
60 kg	Vugar Shirinli; Azerbaijan	Anuar Sariyev; Kazakhstan	Recep Çiftçi; Turkey
60 kg	Vugar Shirinli; Azerbaijan	Anuar Sariyev; Kazakhstan	Alex Bologa; Romania
66 kg	Uchkun Kuranbaev; Uzbekistan	Sérgio Ibáñez; Spain	Yujiro Seto; Japan
66 kg	Uchkun Kuranbaev; Uzbekistan	Sérgio Ibáñez; Spain	Namig Abasli; Azerbaijan
73 kg	Feruz Sayidov; Uzbekistan	Temirzhan Daulet; Kazakhstan	Rufat Mahomedov; Ukraine
73 kg	Feruz Sayidov; Uzbekistan	Temirzhan Daulet; Kazakhstan	Osvaldas Bareikis; Lithuania
81 kg	Huseyn Rahimli; Azerbaijan	Davurkhon Karomatov; Uzbekistan	Eduardo Ávila Sánchez; Mexico
81 kg	Huseyn Rahimli; Azerbaijan	Davurkhon Karomatov; Uzbekistan	Lee Jung-min; South Korea
90 kg	Vahid Nouri; Iran	Elliot Stewart; Great Britain	Hélios Latchoumanaya; France
90 kg	Vahid Nouri; Iran	Elliot Stewart; Great Britain	Oleksandr Nazarenko; Ukraine
100 kg	Chris Skelley; Great Britain	Ben Goodrich; United States	Sharif Khalilov; Uzbekistan
100 kg	Chris Skelley; Great Britain	Ben Goodrich; United States	Anatolii Shevchenko; RPC
+100 kg	Mohammadreza Kheirollahzadeh; Iran	Revaz Chikoidze; Georgia	Ilham Zakiyev; Azerbaijan
+100 kg	Mohammadreza Kheirollahzadeh; Iran	Revaz Chikoidze; Georgia	Choi Gwang-geun; South Korea

=== Women's events ===
Event	Gold	Silver	Bronze
48 kg	Shahana Hajiyeva; Azerbaijan	Sandrine Martinet; France	Viktoriia Potapova; RPC
48 kg	Shahana Hajiyeva; Azerbaijan	Sandrine Martinet; France	Yuliia Ivanytska; Ukraine
52 kg	Cherine Abdellaoui; Algeria	Priscilla Gagné; Canada	Alesia Stepaniuk; RPC
52 kg	Cherine Abdellaoui; Algeria	Priscilla Gagné; Canada	Nataliya Nikolaychyk; Ukraine
57 kg	Sevda Valiyeva; Azerbaijan	Parvina Samandarova; Uzbekistan	Lúcia Araújo; Brazil
57 kg	Sevda Valiyeva; Azerbaijan	Parvina Samandarova; Uzbekistan	Zeynep Çelik; Turkey
63 kg	Khanim Huseynova; Azerbaijan	Iryna Husieva; Ukraine	Wang Yue; China
63 kg	Khanim Huseynova; Azerbaijan	Iryna Husieva; Ukraine	Nafisa Sheripboeva; Uzbekistan
70 kg	Alana Maldonado; Brazil	Ina Kaldani; Georgia	Kazusa Ogawa; Japan
70 kg	Alana Maldonado; Brazil	Ina Kaldani; Georgia	Lenia Ruvalcaba; Mexico
+70 kg	Dursadaf Karimova; Azerbaijan	Zarina Baibatina; Kazakhstan	Meg Emmerich; Brazil
+70 kg	Dursadaf Karimova; Azerbaijan	Zarina Baibatina; Kazakhstan	Carolina Costa; Italy

== See also ==
- Judo at the 2020 Summer Olympics
