= Raziye Uluçam =

Turkish Paralympic judoka

Personal information
- Born: 24 August 1981 (age 44) Afyonkarahisar, Turkey

Sport
- Country: Turkey
- Sport: Para judo
- Disability class: B3
- Club: Aksaray Çağlayan Sports Club
- Coached by: Muzaffer Uluçam
Medal record
Para judo
Representing Turkey
World Championships
Silver medal – second place	2022 Baku	Women's -70kg J2
European Championships
Gold medal – first place	2019 Genoa	Women's -70kg

Raziye Uluçam (born 24 August 1981) is a Turkish Paralympic judoka who competes in international judo competitions. She is a European champion and a World silver medalist. She competed at the 2020 Summer Paralympics where she lost to Mexico's Lenia Ruvalcaba in the women's -70kg bronze medal match.
