= Alana Maldonado =

Brazilian Paralympic judoka (born 1995)

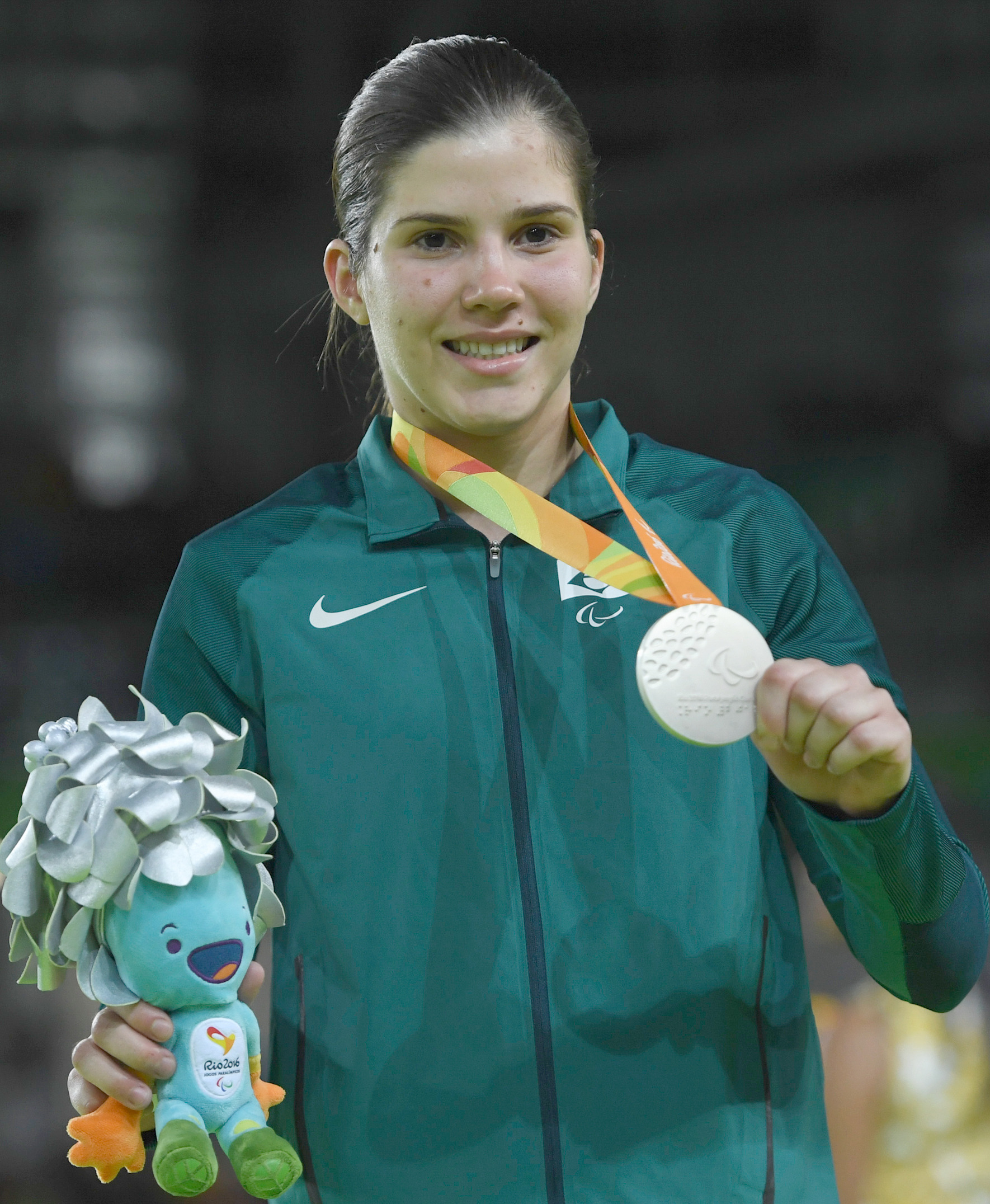
- Maldonado at the Rio 2016 Paralympics

Personal information
- Full name: Alana Martins Maldonado
- Born: 27 July 1995 (age 31) Tupã, São Paulo
- Occupation: Judoka

Sport
- Country: Brazil
- Sport: Para judo
- Disability: Vision impairment
Medal record
Women's para judo
Representing Brazil
Paralympic Games
Gold medal – first place	2020 Tokyo	70 kg
Gold medal – first place	2024 Paris	70 kg
Silver medal – second place	2016 Rio de Janeiro	70 kg
IBSA Judo World Championships
Gold medal – first place	2018 Lisbon	70 kg J2
Gold medal – first place	2022 Baku	70 kg J2
Gold medal – first place	2025 Astana	70 kg J2
Gold medal – first place	2026 Tbilisi	70 kg J2
Parapan American Games
Silver medal – second place	2015 Toronto	70 kg
Silver medal – second place	2019 Lima	70 kg

Profile at external databases
- IJF: 65016
- JudoInside.com: 99694

Alana Martins Maldonado (born 27 July 1995) is a Brazilian para judoka. Competing at the women's 70 kg and visually-impaired classification (J2), she is a double gold medalist at the 2020 and 2024 Summer Paralympics.

Maldonado is also a four-time champion at IBSA Judo World Championships.

== Career ==
Maldonado first result at the international stage came with a silver medal at the 2015 Parapan American Games held in Toronto, Canada. In the final, she was defeated by then paralympics silver medalist Lenia Ruvalcaba of Mexico.

In the following year, Maldonado represented Brazil at her home Paralympics edition held in Rio de Janeiro. She won the silver medal in the women's 70 kg event, where she lost again to Ruvalcaba.

In 2018, Maldonado won her first title at the Para Judo World Championships held in Lisbon, Portugal. The following season, she competed at the 2019 Parapan American Games in Lima, Peru, earning a silver medal.

== Personal life ==
Maldonado is openly lesbian.
