= Judo at the 2020 Summer Paralympics – Women's +70 kg =

Judo – Women's +70 kg at the XVI Paralympic Games
- Venue: Nippon Budokan
- Date: 29 August 2021
- Competitors: 8 from 8 nations

Medalists
1st place, gold medalist(s)		Dursadaf Karimova	Azerbaijan
2nd place, silver medalist(s)		Zarina Baibatina	Kazakhstan
3rd place, bronze medalist(s)		Meg Emmerich	Brazil
3rd place, bronze medalist(s)		Carolina Costa	Italy

The women's +70 kg judo competition at the 2020 Summer Paralympics was held on 29 August 2021 at the Nippon Budokan.

== Results ==
=== Bracket ===
Quarterfinals
Carolina Costa (ITA)	10
Katie Davis (USA)	00
Zarina Baibatina (KAZ)	10
Nyamaagiin Altantsetseg (MGL)	00
Meg Emmerich (BRA)	10
Minako Tsuchiya (JPN)	00
Anastasiia Harnyk (UKR)	00
Dursadaf Karimova (AZE)	10

Semifinals
Carolina Costa (ITA)	00
Zarina Baibatina (KAZ)	10
Meg Emmerich (BRA)	01
Dursadaf Karimova (AZE)	11

Final
Zarina Baibatina (KAZ)	00
Dursadaf Karimova (AZE)	10

=== Repechage ===
Repechage
Katie Davis (USA)	00
Nyamaagiin Altantsetseg (MGL)	10

Bronze medal
Nyamaagiin Altantsetseg (MGL)	00
Meg Emmerich (BRA)	10

Repechage
Minako Tsuchiya (JPN)	00
Anastasiia Harnyk (UKR)	10

Bronze medal
Anastasiia Harnyk (UKR)	00
Carolina Costa (ITA)	10
