= Judo at the 2020 Summer Paralympics – Women's 57 kg =

Judo – Women's 57 kg at the XVI Paralympic Games
- Venue: Nippon Budokan
- Date: 28 August 2021
- Competitors: 10 from 10 nations

Medalists
1st place, gold medalist(s)		Sevda Valiyeva	Azerbaijan
2nd place, silver medalist(s)		Parvina Samandarova	Uzbekistan
3rd place, bronze medalist(s)		Lúcia Araújo	Brazil
3rd place, bronze medalist(s)		Zeynep Çelik	Turkey

The women's 57 kg judo competition at the 2020 Summer Paralympics was held on 28 August 2021 at the Nippon Budokan.

== Results ==
=== Bracket ===
Round of 16
Dayana Fedossova (KAZ)	11
Khaiitkhon Khusan Kyzy (KGZ)	00
Elena Bogdanova (BLR)	00
Junko Hirose (JPN)	10

Quarterfinals
Zeynep Çelik (TUR)	10
Natalia Ovchinnikova (RPC)	00
Sevda Valiyeva (AZE)	10
Dayana Fedossova (KAZ)	00
Parvina Samandarova (UZB)	11
Junko Hirose (JPN)	00
Lúcia Araújo (BRA)	10
Laura González (ARG)	00

Semifinals
Zeynep Çelik (TUR)	00
Sevda Valiyeva (AZE)	10
Parvina Samandarova (UZB)	11
Lúcia Araújo (BRA)	00

Final
Sevda Valiyeva (AZE)	01
Parvina Samandarova (UZB)	00

=== Repechage ===
Repechage
Natalia Ovchinnikova (RPC)	10
Dayana Fedossova (KAZ)	00

Bronze medal
Natalia Ovchinnikova (RPC)	00
Lúcia Araújo (BRA)	10

Repechage
Junko Hirose (JPN)	10
Laura González (ARG)	00

Bronze medal
Junko Hirose (JPN)	01
Zeynep Çelik (TUR)	10
