= Judo at the 2020 Summer Paralympics – Women's 63 kg =

Judo – Women's 63 kg at the XVI Paralympic Games
- Venue: Nippon Budokan
- Date: 28 August 2021
- Competitors: 10 from 10 nations

Medalists
| 1st place, gold medalist(s) | | Khanim Huseynova | Azerbaijan |
| 2nd place, silver medalist(s) | | Iryna Husieva | Ukraine |
| 3rd place, bronze medalist(s) | | Wang Yue | China |
| 3rd place, bronze medalist(s) | | Nafisa Sheripboeva | Uzbekistan |

The women's 63 kg judo competition at the 2020 Summer Paralympics was held on 28 August 2021 at the Nippon Budokan.

== Results ==
=== Bracket ===
Round of 16
Duygu Çete Artar (TUR) | 00
Olga Pozdnysheva (RPC) | 10
Maria Liana Mutia (USA) | 00
Hiroko Kudo (JPN) | 10

Quarterfinals
Iryna Husieva (UKR) | 10
Nicolina Pernheim (SWE) | 01
Nafisa Sheripboeva (UZB) | 10
Olga Pozdnysheva (RPC) | 00
Wang Yue (CHN) | 10
Marta Arce Payno (ESP) | 00
Khanim Huseynova (AZE) | 10
Hiroko Kudo (JPN) | 00

Semifinals
Iryna Husieva (UKR) | 10
Nafisa Sheripboeva (UZB) | 00
Wang Yue (CHN) | 00
Khanim Huseynova (AZE) | 01

Final
Iryna Husieva (UKR) | 00
Khanim Huseynova (AZE) | 01

=== Repechage ===
Repechage
Nicolina Pernheim (SWE) | 00
Olga Pozdnysheva (RPC) | 10

Bronze medal
Olga Pozdnysheva (RPC) | 00
Wang Yue (CHN) | 10

Repechage
Marta Arce Payno (ESP) | 10
Hiroko Kudo (JPN) | 00

Bronze medal
Marta Arce Payno (ESP) | 00
Nafisa Sheripboeva (UZB) | 10
