= Swimming at the 2020 Summer Paralympics – Men's 200 metre individual medley SM7 =

Men's 200 metre individual medley SM7 at the XVI Paralympic Games
- Venue: Tokyo Aquatics Centre
- Dates: 27 August 2021
- Competitors: 13 from 10 nations

The Men's 200 metre individual medley S7 event at the 2020 Paralympic Games took place on 27 August 2021, at the Tokyo Aquatics Centre.

== Records ==
World record	Mark Malyar (ISR)	2:29.01	Tokyo, Japan	27 August 2021
Paralympic record	Mark Malyar (ISR)	2:29.01	Tokyo, Japan	27 August 2021

== Heats ==
The swimmers with the top 8 times, regardless of heat, advanced to the final.

Rank	Heat	Lane	Name	Nationality	Time	Notes
	1	2	Egor Efrosinin	RPC		
	1	3	Andrii Trusov	Ukraine		
	1	4	Mark Malyar	Israel		
	1	5	Inaki Basiloff	Argentina		
	1	6	Rudy Garcia-Tolson	United States		
	1	7	Ernie Gawilan	Philippines		
	2	1	Suyash Jadhav	India		
	2	2	Pipo Carlomagno	Argentina		
	2	3	Ievgenii Bogodaiko	Ukraine		
	2	4	Carlos Serrano Zárate	Colombia		
	2	5	Evan Austin	United States		
	2	6	Christian Sadie	South Africa		
	2	7	Chen Liang-da	Chinese Taipei		
