= Judo at the 2020 Summer Paralympics – Women's 70 kg =

Judo – Women's 70 kg at the XVI Paralympic Games
- Venue: Nippon Budokan
- Date: 29 August 2021
- Competitors: 9 from 9 nations

Medalists
| 1st place, gold medalist(s) | | Alana Maldonado | Brazil |
| 2nd place, silver medalist(s) | | Ina Kaldani | Georgia |
| 3rd place, bronze medalist(s) | | Kazusa Ogawa | Japan |
| 3rd place, bronze medalist(s) | | Lenia Ruvalcaba | Mexico |

The women's 70 kg judo competition at the 2020 Summer Paralympics was held on 29 August 2021 at the Nippon Budokan.

== Results ==
=== Bracket ===
Round of 16
Lucija Brešković (CRO) | 00
Raziye Uluçam (TUR) | 10
Theodora Paschalidou (GRE) | 00
Kazusa Ogawa (JPN) | 10

Quarterfinals
Alana Maldonado (BRA) | 10
Matilde Lauria (ITA) | 00
Olga Zabrodskaia (RPC) | 00
Raziye Uluçam (TUR) | 01
Lenia Ruvalcaba (MEX) | 00
Ina Kaldani (GEO) | 10
~~Vasila Aliboeva (UZB)~~
Kazusa Ogawa (JPN) | Bye

Semifinals
Alana Maldonado (BRA) | 10
Raziye Uluçam (TUR) | 00
Ina Kaldani (GEO) | 10
Kazusa Ogawa (JPN) | 00

Final
Alana Maldonado (BRA) | 01
Ina Kaldani (GEO) | 00

=== Repechage ===
Repechage 1
Lucija Brešković (CRO) | 00
Olga Zabrodskaia (RPC) | 10

Repechage 2
Matilde Lauria (ITA) | 00
Olga Zabrodskaia (RPC) | 10

Bronze medal
Olga Zabrodskaia (RPC) | 00
Kazusa Ogawa (JPN) | 01

Repechage 2
Lenia Ruvalcaba (MEX) | 10
Theodora Paschalidou (GRE) | 00

Bronze medal
Lenia Ruvalcaba (MEX) | 10
Raziye Uluçam (TUR) | 00
