= Khanim Huseynova =

Azerbaijani Paralympic judoka (born 1993)

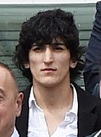

Personal information
- Born: 1 March 1993 (age 33)
- Occupation: Judoka

Sport
- Country: Azerbaijan
- Sport: Paralympic judo
- Weight class: ‍–‍63 kg, ‍–‍70 kg

Achievements and titles
- Paralympic Games: (gold) (2020)
- European Champ.: R16 (2015)
Medal record
Representing Azerbaijan
Women's paralympic judo
Paralympic Games
Gold medal – first place	2020 Tokyo	‍–‍63 kg
European Para Championships
Gold medal – first place	2023 Rotterdam	‍–‍70 kg J2
Women's judo
IJF Grand Slam
Bronze medal – third place	2017 Baku	‍–‍63 kg
European Cadet Championships
Silver medal – second place	2009 Koper	‍–‍63 kg
Bronze medal – third place	2008 Sarajevo	‍–‍63 kg

Profile at external databases
- IJF: 2544
- JudoInside.com: 86472
- Updated on 22 August 2023

Khanim Huseynova (born 1 March 1993) is an Azerbaijani Paralympic judoka. She won the gold medal in the women's 63 kg event at the 2020 Summer Paralympics held in Tokyo, Japan.

== Personal life ==
Khanim is the sister of Azerbaijani judoka and Paralympic gold medalist Dursadaf Karimova.
