= Döndü Yeşilyurt =

Turkish para judoka

Personal information
- Nationality: Turkish
- Born: 20 December 1993 (age 32) Alaçam, Samsun, Turkey

Sport
- Country: Turkey
- Sport: Judo, weightlifting
- Event: 57 kg
Medal record
Representing Turkey
Women's Judo
IBSA Judo World Championship,
Gold medal – first place	2022 Baku	-57 kg
European Para Championships
Gold medal – first place	2023 Rotterdam	-57 kg J1
Women's Weightlifting
Gold medal – first place	2018 Luxor	Powerling
Silver medal – second place	2018 Luxor	Bench press

Döndü Yeşilyurt (born 20 December 1993) is a Turkish world and European champion female visually impaired judoka competing in the −57 kg division. She is also a national para weightlifter.

== Sport career ==
While in Ankara for university study, Yeşilyurt decided to perform arm wrestling. For this reason, she searched for organizations serving visually impaired people unaware of knowing about the sport clubs specialized for disabled people. In 2016, a weightlifting coach for visually impaired sportspeople she met, recommended her to start weightlifting sport. She had a strong physical body structure she had developed in village life. Already in 2017, she became Turkish champion. This time, her coach encouraged her for judo, and she performed both weightlifting and judo.

In February 2017, she became the runner-up at the Turkish Para Judo Championship. She was then admitted to the Turkey national para judo team. A few months later that year, she debuted internationally at a tournament in Latvia winning her first medal as runner-up. At the 2018 IBSA Powerlifting and Bench Press World Championships in Luxor, Egypt, she took gold medal in bench press and the silver medal in powerlifting.

In 2022, she became world champion at the IBSA Judo World Championship in Baku, Azerbaijan. At the 2023 European Para Championships in Rotterdam, Netherlands, she won the gold medal in the −57 Ü J1 event.

== Personal life ==
Döndü Yeşilyurt was born at Kızlar village of Alaçam district in Samsun Province, Turkey's Black Sea Region on 20 December 1993. She grew up in the village before her father moved the family to Bursa in 2007. She learned about her eye disorder retinitis pigmentosa, which caused 50% loss of eyesight. She stated that "before she started performing sports, she stepped out home only to go to the school". She told further that "if she had not been visually impaired, she would pursue a career as a soldier or a policewoman". After finishing the high school, she studied at Gazi University in Ankara to become a tour guide. For living, she started to work in the Provincial Directoriate of Youth and Sports in Ankara.
