= Iryna Husieva =

Ukrainian Paralympic judoka (born 1987)

Personal information
- Born: 5 August 1987 (age 38)

Sport
- Country: Ukraine
- Sport: Paralympic judo
Medal record
Paralympic Games
Silver medal – second place	2016 Rio de Janeiro	63 kg
Silver medal – second place	2020 Tokyo	63 kg
IBSA European Championships
Gold medal – first place	2015 Odivelas	63 kg

Iryna Borysivna Husieva (Ukrainian: Ірина Борисівна Гусєва; born 5 August 1987) is a Ukrainian Paralympic judoka. She represented Ukraine at the 2016 Summer Paralympics held in Rio de Janeiro, Brazil and she won the silver medal in the women's 63 kg event. She also won the silver medal in the women's 63 kg event at the 2020 Summer Paralympics held in Tokyo, Japan.

At the 2015 IBSA European Judo Championships held in Odivelas, Portugal, she won the gold medal in the women's 63 kg event.
