= Judo at the 2023 European Para Championships =

Para judo competition

Judo Judo at the 2023 European Para Championships
- Venue: Rotterdam Ahoy
- Location: Rotterdam, Netherlands
- Start date: 8 August
- End date: 10 August
- Website: Official website

Competition at external databases
- Links: JudoInside

Judo at the 2023 European Para Championships in Rotterdam, Netherlands was held between 8 and 10 August. There were nine men's events and eight women's events.

The judoka could gain points in their respective sport category ranking list for the 2024 Summer Paralympics.

== Medalists ==
=== Men ===
Event	Gold	Silver	Bronze
Men's –60kg J1	Miguel Vieira; Portugal	Armindo Rodrigues; France	Mykola Rudnyk; Ukraine
Men's –60kg J1	Miguel Vieira; Portugal	Armindo Rodrigues; France	Ismayil Muradov; Azerbaijan
Men's –73kg J1	Alex Bologa; Romania	Lennart Sass; Germany	Djibrilo Iafa; Portugal
Men's –73kg J1	Alex Bologa; Romania	Lennart Sass; Germany	Yavuz Gökçe; Turkey
Men's –90kg J1	Oleg Cretul; Moldova	Daniel Powell; Great Britain	Yasin Çimciler; Turkey
Men's –90kg J1	Oleg Cretul; Moldova	Daniel Powell; Great Britain	Eduard Tropinov; Ukraine
Men's +90kg J1	Ion Basoc; Moldova	Ilham Zakiyev; Azerbaijan	Onur Taştan; Turkey
Men's +90kg J1	Ion Basoc; Moldova	Ilham Zakiyev; Azerbaijan	Jason Grandry; France
Men's –60kg J2	Davyd Khorava; Ukraine	Luis Daniel Gavilan Lorenzo; Spain	Zurab Zurabiani; Georgia
Men's –60kg J2	Davyd Khorava; Ukraine	Luis Daniel Gavilan Lorenzo; Spain	Nukri Migrijanashvili; Georgia
Men's –73kg J2	Giorgi Kaldani; Georgia	Namig Abasli; Azerbaijan	Nathan Petit; France
Men's –73kg J2	Giorgi Kaldani; Georgia	Namig Abasli; Azerbaijan	Sergio Ibanez Banon; Spain
Men's –90kg J2	Helios Latchoumanaya; France	Oleksandr Nazarenko; Ukraine	Evan Molloy; Great Britain
Men's –90kg J2	Helios Latchoumanaya; France	Oleksandr Nazarenko; Ukraine	Lasha Kizilashvili; Georgia
Men's +90kg J2	Revaz Chikoidze; Georgia	Chris Skelley; Great Britain	Jack Hodgson; Great Britain
Men's +90kg J2	Revaz Chikoidze; Georgia	Chris Skelley; Great Britain	İbrahim Bölükbaşı; Turkey
Team event	(International Paralympic Committee) IBSA Team	Turkey	Georgia
Team event	(International Paralympic Committee) IBSA Team	Turkey	France

=== Women ===
Event	Gold	Silver	Bronze
Women's –48kg J1	Nataliya Nikolaychyk; Ukraine	Ecem Taşın; Turkey	Anna Tabea Muller; Germany
Women's –48kg J1	Nataliya Nikolaychyk; Ukraine	Ecem Taşın; Turkey	Emmanouela Masourou; Greece
Women's –57kg J1	Döndü Yeşilyurt; Turkey	Anzhela Havrysiuk; Ukraine	Flóra Burányi; Hungary
Women's –57kg J1	Döndü Yeşilyurt; Turkey	Anzhela Havrysiuk; Ukraine	María Manzanero; Spain
Women's –70kg J1	Theodora Paschalidou; Greece	Merve Uslu; Turkey	Only two judoka
Women's +70kg J1	Anastasiia Harnyk; Ukraine	Nazan Akın Güneş; Turkey	Khatira Ismiyeva; Azerbaijan
Women's –48kg J2	Shahana Hajiyeva; Azerbaijan	Yuliia Ivanytska; Ukraine	Only two judoka
Women's –57kg J2	Inna Sych; Ukraine	Zeynep Çelik; Turkey	Marta Arce Payno; Spain
Women's –57kg J2	Inna Sych; Ukraine	Zeynep Çelik; Turkey	Ramona Brussig; Germany
Women's –70kg J2	Khanim Huseynova; Azerbaijan	Ina Kaldani; Georgia	Only two athletes participated
Women's +70kg J2	Prescillia Lézé; France	Dursadaf Karimova; Azerbaijan	Kirsten Taylor; Great Britain
Team event	Ukraine	Turkey	only teams competed

== Medal table ==
* Host nation (Netherlands)

Rank	Nation	Gold	Silver	Bronze	Total
1	Ukraine	5	3	2	10
2	Azerbaijan	2	3	2	7
3	Georgia	2	1	3	6
4	France	2	1	2	5
5	Moldova	2	0	0	2
6	Turkey	1	6	4	11
7	Greece	1	0	1	2
7	Portugal	1	0	1	2
9	International Paralympic Committee	1	0	0	1
9	Romania	1	0	0	1
11	Great Britain	0	2	3	5
12	Spain	0	1	3	4
13	Germany	0	1	2	3
14	Hungary	0	0	2	2
Totals (14 entries)		18	18	25	61

== See also ==
- Judo at the 2023 European Games
