= Prescillia Lézé =

French Paralympic judoka

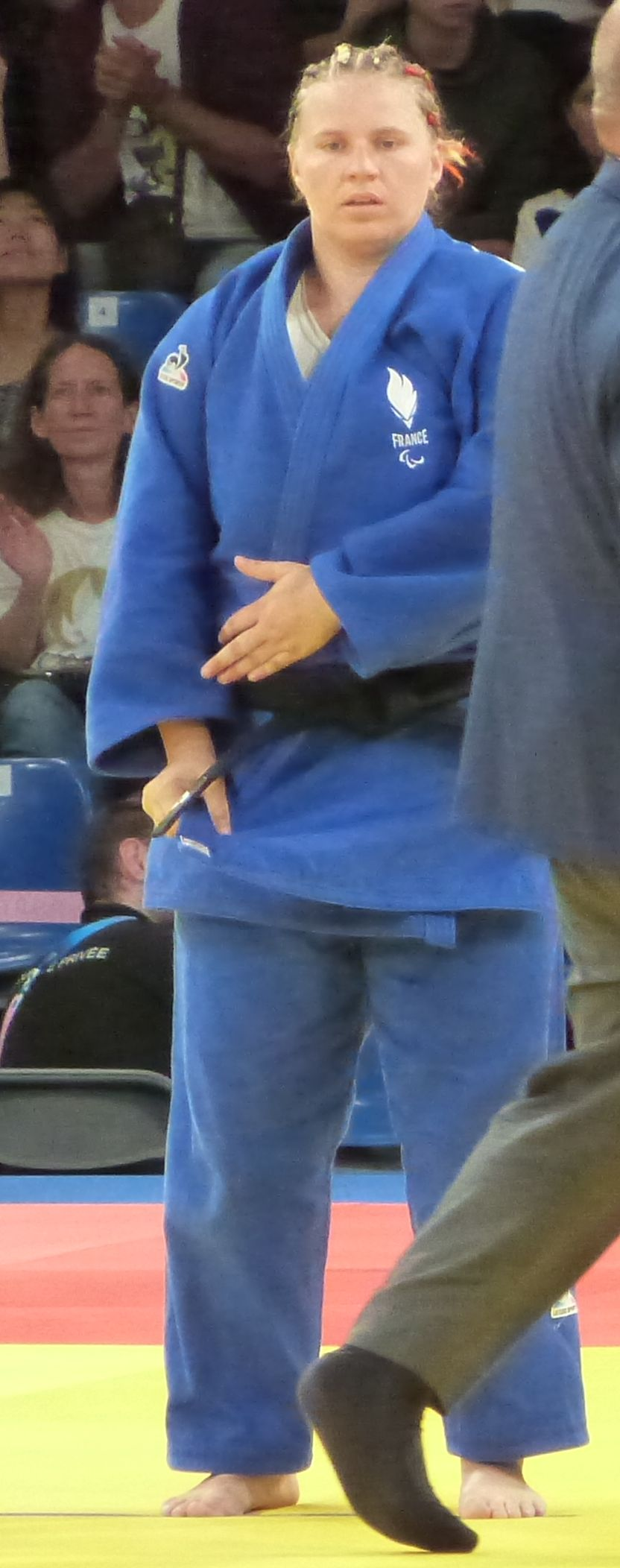

Personal information
- Born: 25 July 1999 (age 26) Entraigues-sur-la-Sorgue, France

Sport
- Sport: Para judo
- Disability: Stargardt's disease
Medal record
Representing France
European Para Championships
Gold medal – first place	2023 Rotterdam	J2 +70kg
IBSA European Championships
Silver medal – second place	2022 Cagliari	J2 +70kg
Bronze medal – third place	2017 Walsall	+70kg

Prescillia Lézé (born 25 July 1999) is a French Paralympic judoka who competes in international judo competitions. She is a European champion and a four-time French champion, she has been selected to compete at the 2024 Summer Paralympics.
