= Kazusa Ogawa =

Japanese Paralympic judoka

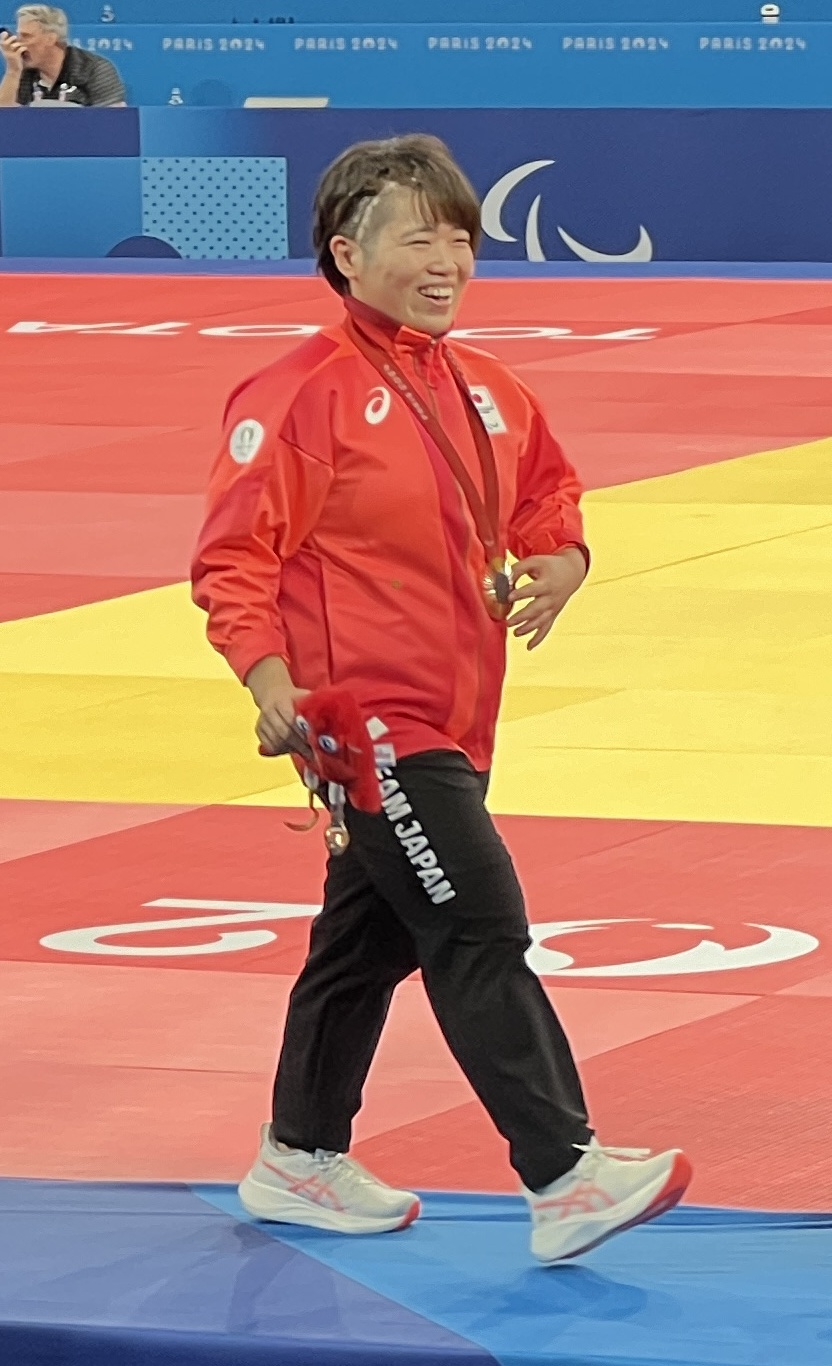

Personal information
- Born: 16 February 1997 (age 29)

Sport
- Country: Japan
- Sport: Paralympic judo
Medal record
Paralympic Games
Bronze medal – third place	2020 Tokyo	70 kg
Bronze medal – third place	2024 Paris	70 kg J2

Kazusa Ogawa (小川 和紗, Ogawa Kazusa, born 16 February 1997) is a Japanese Paralympic judoka. She won one of the bronze medals in the women's 70 kg event at the 2020 Summer Paralympics held in Tokyo, Japan.
