= Sevda Valiyeva =

Azerbaijani Paralympic judoka

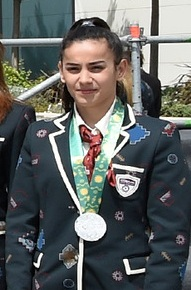

Personal information
- Citizenship: Azerbaijani
- Born: 24 December 1997 (age 28) Baku, Azerbaijan
- Education: Azerbaijan State Academy of Physical Education and Sport

Sport
- Country: Azerbaijan
- Sport: Paralympic judo
- Weight class: 57 kg
- Coached by: Rashad Mamedov
Medal record
Paralympic Games
Gold medal – first place	2020 Tokyo	57 kg
Grand-Prix
Gold medal – first place	2019 Baku	57 kg
European Championships
Silver medal – second place	2019 Genova	57 kg
Gold medal – first place	2017 Walsall	57 kg
Islamic Solidarity Games
Silver medal – second place	2017 Baku	57 kg

Sevda Valiyeva (Azerbaijani: Sevda Vəliyeva; born 24 December 1997) is an Azerbaijani Paralympic judoka. She won the gold medal in the women's 57 kg event at the 2020 Summer Paralympics held in Tokyo, Japan.

After becoming an Paralympic champion at Tokyo in 2020, Sevda Valiyeva took time off to marry Rufat Hajili, head of the International Communication and Marketing Department of NPC Azerbaijan and vice president of the Azerbaijan Abilympic Federation, and give birth to their first child, Emilia.
