= Zeynep Çelik (judoka) =

Turkish Paralympic judoka

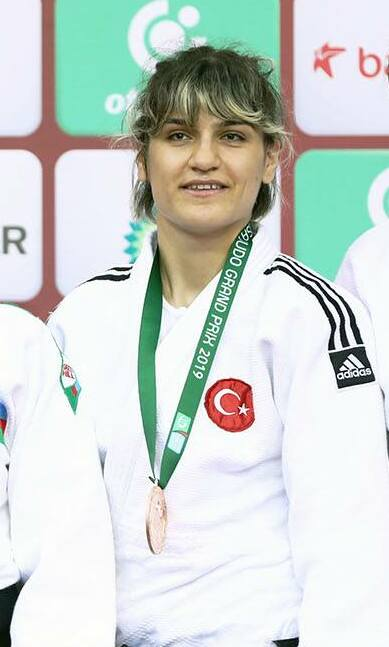

Personal information
- Born: 7 April 1996 (age 30) Ağrı, Turkey
- Occupation: Judoka
- Height: 168 cm (5 ft 6 in)
- Weight: 57 kg (126 lb)

Sport
- Country: Turkey
- Sport: Paralympic judo
- Club: KocaeliBB Kağıt Spor
- Coached by: Ahmet Ömre Türe
Medal record
Paralympic Games
Bronze medal – third place	2020 Tokyo	57 kg
IBSA World Championships
Gold medal – first place	2022 Baku	–57 kg
Gold medal – first place	2018 Odivelas	–57 kg
IBSA European Championships
Gold medal – first place	2017 Walsall	–57 kg
Bronze medal – third place	2015 Odivelas	–52 kg
European Para Championships
Silver medal – second place	2023 Rotterdam	–57 kg J2
International Tournaments
Gold medal – first place	2023 Heidelberg	–57 kg

Profile at external databases
- IJF: 65004
- JudoInside.com: 99779

Zeynep Çelik (born 7 April 1996) is a Turkish world and European champion Paralympic judoka with visual impairment.

== Sport career ==
Çelik is 168 cm (5 ft 6 in) tall at 57 kg (126 lb). She is a member of Kocaeli BB Kağıt SK and is coached by Ahmet Ömre Türe. She has a visual impairment of sport disability classification B3.

Çelik won the bronze medal at the 2015 IBSA European Judo Championships in Odivelas, Portugal. She became gold medalist at the 2017 IBSA European Judo Championships in Walsall, United Kingdom, and at the 2018 IBSA Judo World Championships in Odivelas, Portugal. At the 2021 IBSA Judo World Grand Prix in Baku, Azerbaijan, she suffered a fracture on her left wrist. She was cured for two and half months before she attended the 2020 Tokyo Paralympics. She won one of the bronze medals in the women's 57 kg event at the 2020 Summer Paralympics held in Tokyo, Japan. She took the gold medal at the 2022 IBSA Judo World Championships in Baku, Azerbaijan. In 2023, she won the gold medal at the IBSA International German Open Tournament in Heidelberg, Germany. She took the silver medal at the 2023 European Para Championships in Rotterdam, Netherlands.

== Personal life ==
Zeynep Çelik was born as a daughter to a family with fifteen children in Ağrı, eastern Turkey on 7 April 1996. She is disabled with a visual impairment.

She studies Sports Coaching in the Faculty of Sports Science at Karamanoğlu Mehmetbey University in Karaman.
