= Swimming at the 2020 Summer Paralympics – Men's 100 metre backstroke S7 =

Men's 100 metre backstroke S7 at the XVI Paralympic Games
- Venue: Tokyo Aquatics Centre
- Dates: 30 August 2021
- Competitors: 11 from 10 nations

Medalists
1st place, gold medalist(s)		Andrii Trusov	Ukraine
2nd place, silver medalist(s)		Pipo Carlomagno	Argentina
3rd place, bronze medalist(s)		Mark Malyar	Israel

The Men's 100 metre backstroke S7 event at the 2020 Paralympic Games took place on 30 August 2021, at the Tokyo Aquatics Centre.

== Records ==
World Record	Bohdan Hrynenko (UKR)	1:08.92	London, Great Britain	12 September 2019
Paralympic Record	Jonathan Fox (GBR)	1:09.86	London, Great Britain	30 August 2012

== Heats ==
The swimmers with the top 8 times, regardless of heat, advanced to the final.

Rank	Heat	Lane	Name	Nationality	Time	Notes
1	2	4	Pipo Carlomagno	Argentina	1:09.12	Q
2	2	5	Andrii Trusov	Ukraine	1:10.20	Q
3	1	4	Andrei Gladkov	RPC	1:10.84	Q
4	1	5	Mark Malyar	Israel	1:11.92	Q
5	2	3	Federico Bicelli	Italy	1:13.68	Q
6	1	3	Ievgenii Bogodaiko	Ukraine	1:13.75	Q
7	2	2	Lucas Nicolas Poggi	Argentina	1:14.53	Q
8	2	6	Inaki Basiloff	Argentina	1:15.43	Q
9	1	2	Chen Liang-da	Chinese Taipei	1:18.28	
10	2	7	Ernie Gawilan	Philippines	1:21.60	
	1	6	Christian Sadie	South Africa	DNS	
