= Meg Emmerich =

Brazilian para judoka (born 1986)

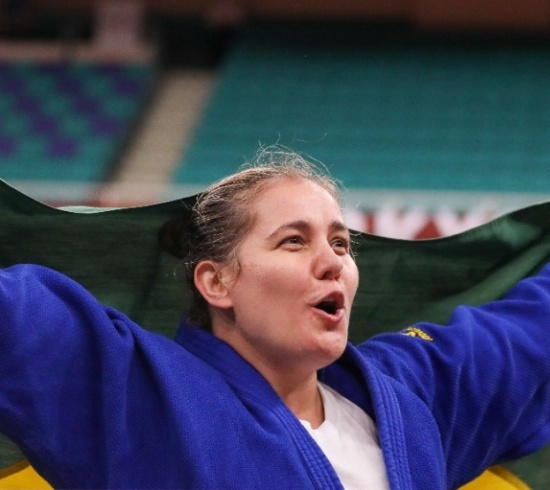

Personal information
- Full name: Meg Rodrigues Vitorino Emmerich
- Born: 23 October 1986 (age 39) São Paulo, Brazil
- Occupation: Judoka

Sport
- Country: Brazil
- Sport: Para judo
- Weight class: +70 kg
Medal record
Women's para judo
Representing Brazil
Paralympic Games
| Bronze medal – third place | 2020 Tokyo | +70 kg |
World Championships
| Bronze medal – third place | 2022 Baku | +70 kg |
| Bronze medal – third place | 2018 Lisbon | +70 kg |
Parapan American Games
| Gold medal – first place | 2019 Lima | +70 kg |
| Silver medal – second place | 2023 Santiago | +70 kg |
Pan American Championships
| Silver medal – second place | 2018 Calgary | +70 kg |

Profile at external databases
- IJF: 65028
- JudoInside.com: 121936
- Updated on 7 July 2024

Meg Rodrigues Vitorino Emmerich (born 23 October 1986) is a Brazilian para judoka.

== Early life ==
Emmerich was born in São Paulo, capital of the state of São Paulo, in 1986. She was born with optic nerve atrophy, a hereditary disease that causes vision loss. She moved to Maringá, a city in the interior of the state of Paraná.

== Judo career ==
In 2018, Emmerich competed in two championships representing Brazil. The first was the Pan American Adaptive Judo Championships, held in Calgary, Canada, where she won the silver medal in the +70 kg category. In Lisbon, Portugal, she won the bronze medal for her category at the IBSA Judo World Championships, after losing to South Korean Park Ha-yeong.

Emmerich was part of the Brazilian delegation, to participate in the 2019 Parapan American Games, held in Lima, Peru. She secured gold for Brazil, in the +70 kg category. Due to her victorious performance, she was elected the best judo athlete at the 2019 Paralympic Awards, held by the Brazilian Paralympic Committee (CPB).

Emmerich represented Brazil again, this time, at the 2020 Summer Paralympics, held in 2021 due to the COVID-19 pandemic, in Tokyo, Japan. She won the bronze medal, defeating Mongolian Altantsetseg Nyamaa, in the +70 kg category.

In 2022, Emmerich participated in the World Championships, in Baku, Azerbaijan. In the competition, she won bronze in her category.
