= Zarina Baibatina =

Kazakhstani Paralympic judoka

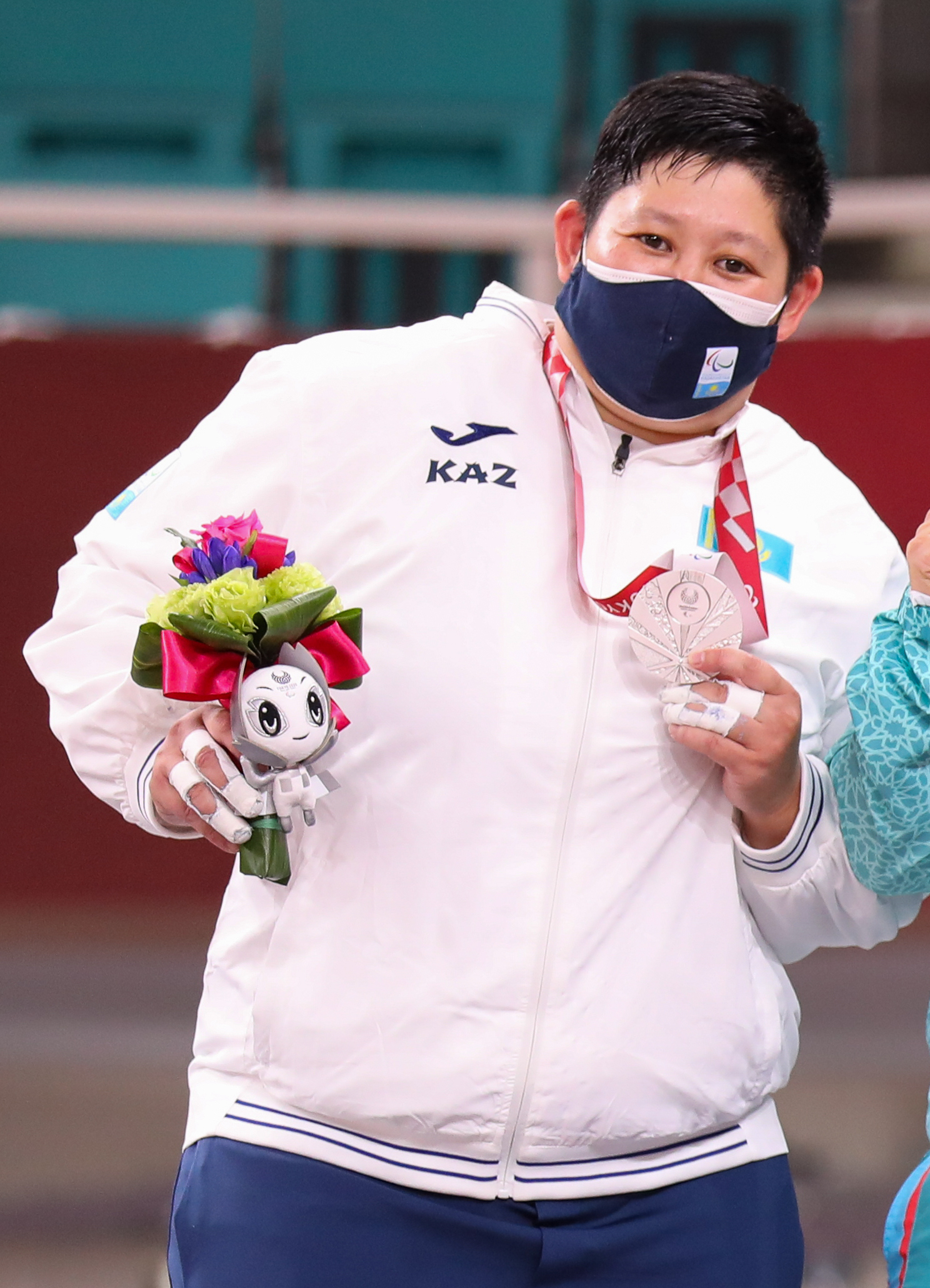

Personal information
- Born: 11 May 1984 (age 42) Aksu, Kazakh SSR, Soviet Union

Sport
- Country: Kazakhstan
- Sport: Para judo
- Disability: Vision impairment
Medal record
Paralympic Games
Silver medal – second place	2020 Tokyo	+70 kg

Zarina Baibatina (born 11 May 1984) is a visually impaired Kazakhstani Paralympic judoka. She represented Kazakhstan at the 2020 Summer Paralympics in Tokyo, Japan and she won the silver medal in the women's +70 kg event.
