= Sergio Ibáñez =

Spanish Paralympic judoka

Personal information
- Full name: Sergio Ibáñez Banon
- Born: 19 January 1999 (age 27)

Sport
- Country: Spain
- Sport: Paralympic judo
Medal record
Paralympic judo
Representing Spain
Paralympic Games
Silver medal – second place	2020 Tokyo	66 kg
European Para Championships
Bronze medal – third place	2023 Rotterdam	73 kg J2
IBSA European Championships
Silver medal – second place	2017 Walsall	60 kg
Bronze medal – third place	2019 Genoa	66 kg

Sergio Ibáñez Banon (born 19 January 1999) is a Spanish Paralympic judoka. He won a silver medal in the men's 66 kg event at the 2020 Summer Paralympics held in Tokyo, Japan.
