= Uchkun Kuranbaev =

Uzbekistani Paralympic judoka

Personal information
- Born: 18 July 1996 (age 29)

Sport
- Country: Uzbekistan
- Sport: Paralympic judo
Medal record
Paralympic judo
Representing Uzbekistan
Paralympic Games
Gold medal – first place	2020 Tokyo	66 kg
Bronze medal – third place	2024 Paris	73 kg
Asian Para Games
Bronze medal – third place	2022 Hangzhou	73 kg

Uchkun Kuranbaev (born 18 July 1996) is an Uzbek Paralympic judoka. He won a gold medal at the 2020 Summer Paralympics in the men's 66 kg.
