= Anzhela Havrysiuk =

Ukrainian Paralympic judoka (born 1998)

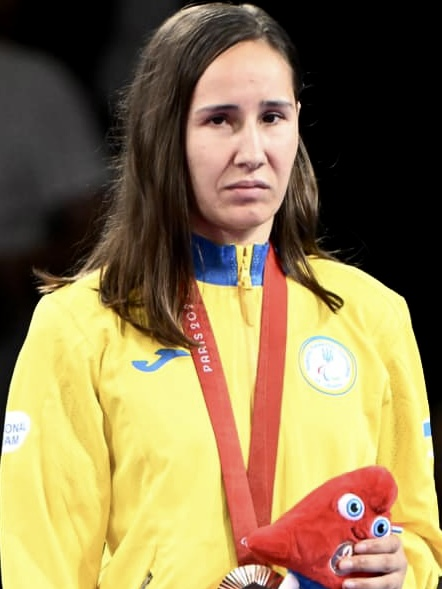
- Havrysiuk at the 2024 Summer Paralympics

Personal information
- Nationality: Ukrainian
- Born: 4 January 1998 (age 28)
- Home town: Rivne, Ukraine
- Occupation: Judoka

Sport
- Country: Ukraine
- Sport: Para judo
- Disability class: J1
- Weight class: −57 kg
Medal record
Women's para judo
Representing Ukraine
Paralympic Games
Bronze medal – third place	2024 Paris	−57 kg J1
European Para Championships
Gold medal – first place	2023 Rotterdam	+70 kg J1

Profile at external databases
- JudoInside.com: 156484

Anzhela Havrysiuk (born 4 January 1998) is a Ukrainian Paralympic judoka. She represented Ukraine at the 2024 Summer Paralympics.

== Career ==
Havrysiuk represented Ukraine at the 2023 European Para Championships and won a gold medal in the +70 kg J1 event.

Havrysiuk represented Ukraine at the 2024 Summer Paralympics and won a bronze medal in the −57 kg J1 event.
