= María Garrone (table tennis) =

Argentine para table tennis player

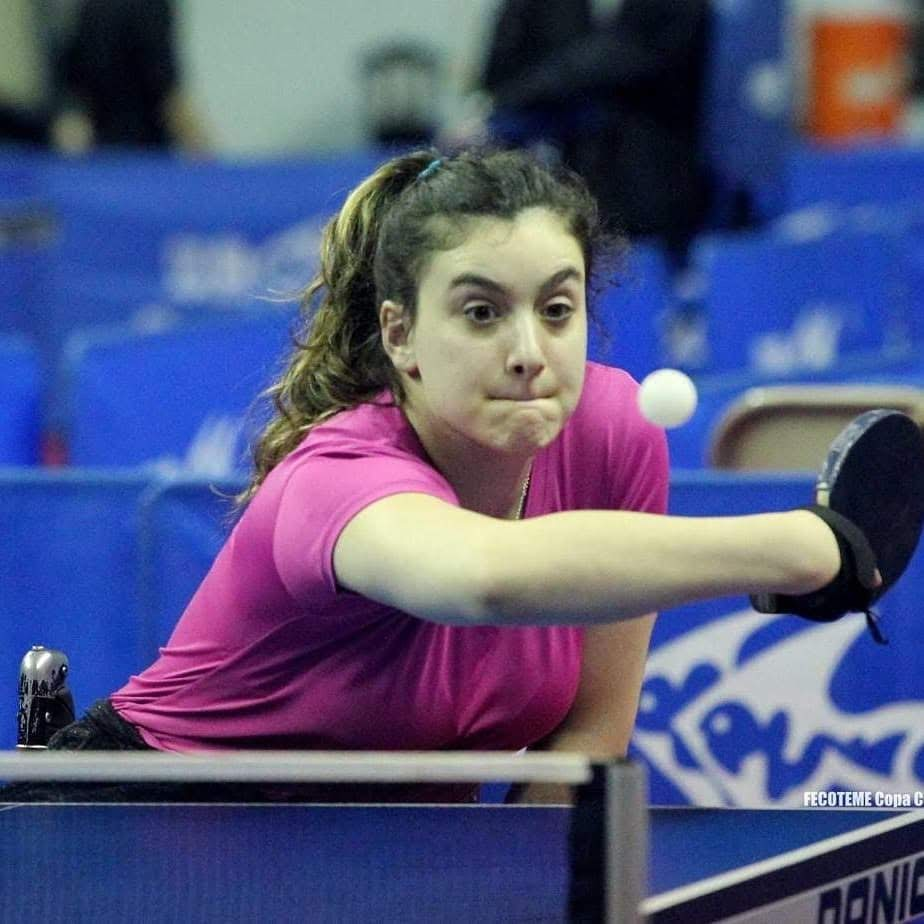

Personal information
- Born: 22 October 1996 (age 29) Ituzaingó, Buenos Aires, Argentina

Sport
- Sport: Para table tennis
Medal record
Representing Argentina
World Championships
Bronze medal – third place	2022 Granada	Singles C2
Parapan American Games
Bronze medal – third place	2019 Lima	Teams C2-5
Bronze medal – third place	2023 Santiago	Doubles C5-10
Bronze medal – third place	2023 Santiago	Mixed doubles 4-7

María Constanza "Coty" Garrone (born 22 October 1996) is an Argentine para table tennis player who competes in international table tennis competitions. She is a three-time Parapan American Games bronze medalist and World bronze medalist. She has competed at the 2020 and 2024 Summer Paralympics.

Garrone became paralysed following a gymnastics accident when she was fourteen. She took up adapted table tennis four years later.
