= Flóra Burányi =

Hungarian Paralympic judoka

Personal information
- Born: 6 November 1990 (age 35) Eger, Hungary
- Occupation: Judoka

Sport
- Country: Hungary
- Sport: Para judo
- Coached by: Bertalan Hajtos
Medal record
Para judo
Representing Hungary
IBSA European Judo Championships
| Bronze medal – third place | 2013 Eger | -57kg |
European Para Championships
| Bronze medal – third place | 2023 Rotterdam | -57kg J1 |

Profile at external databases
- IJF: 73557
- JudoInside.com: 99811

Flóra Burányi (born 6 November 1990) is a blind Hungarian para judoka who competes in international level events. She is a European bronze medalist and she competed at the 2016 Summer Paralympics.
