= Dursadaf Karimova =

Azerbaijani Paralympic judoka

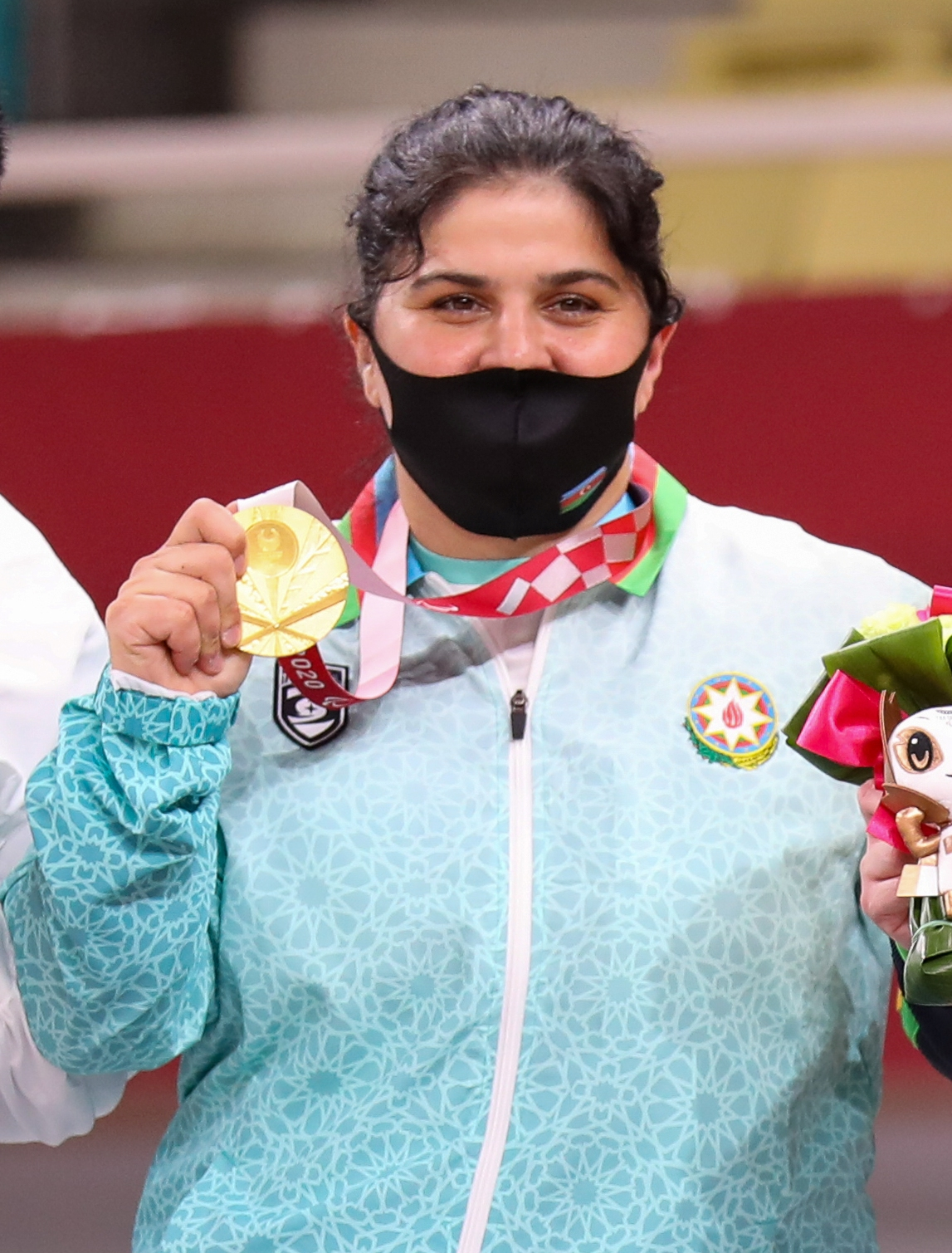
- Dursadaf Karimova at the 2020 Summer Paralympics

Personal information
- Born: 23 August 1985 (age 40)
- Occupation: Judoka

Sport
- Country: Azerbaijan
- Sport: Judo, Para judo
- Disability: Vision impairment
- Disability class: B3

Achievements and titles
- Paralympic Games: (gold) (2020)
- World Champ.: R32 (2007)
Medal record
Representing Azerbaijan
Women's para judo
Paralympic Games
Gold medal – first place	2020 Tokyo	+70 kg
European Para Championships
Silver medal – second place	2023 Rotterdam	+70 kg J2
IBSA European Championships
Silver medal – second place	2019 Genoa	+70 kg
Bronze medal – third place	2022 Cagliari	+70 kg J2
Women's judo
IJF Grand Prix
Gold medal – first place	2012 Baku	‍–‍78 kg

Profile at external databases
- IJF: 10818, 65027
- JudoInside.com: 14184, 86393
- Updated on 22 August 2023

Dursadaf Karimova (born 23 August 1985) is a visually impaired Azerbaijani Paralympic judoka. She won the gold medal in the women's +70 kg event at the 2020 Summer Paralympics held in Tokyo, Japan.

== Personal life ==
Dursadaf is the sister of Azerbaijani judoka, and Paralympic gold medalist Khanim Huseynova.
