= Wang Yue (judoka) =

Chinese Paralympic judoka

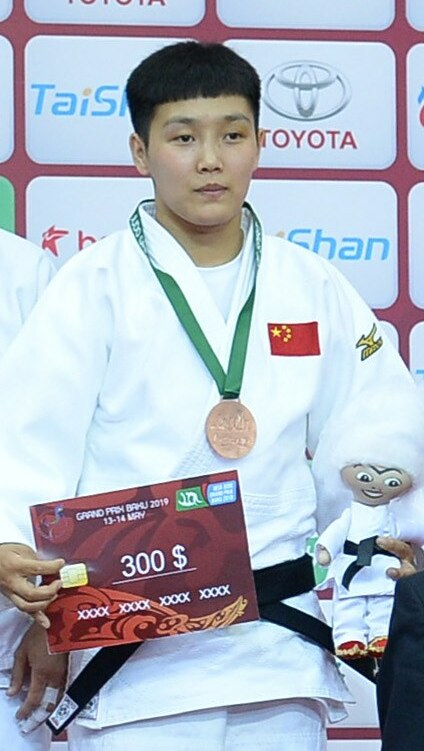

Personal information
- Born: 12 February 1997 (age 29) China

Sport
- Country: China
- Sport: Paralympic judo
Medal record
Paralympic Games
Bronze medal – third place	2020 Tokyo	63 kg
Asian Para Games
Gold medal – first place	2022 Hangzhou	70 kg
Silver medal – second place	2018 Jakarta	63 kg

Wang Yue (born 12 February 1997) is a Chinese Paralympic judoka. She won one of the bronze medals in the women's 63 kg event at the 2020 Summer Paralympics held in Tokyo, Japan.
