= Nafisa Sheripboeva =

Uzbekistani Paralympic judoka (born 2001)

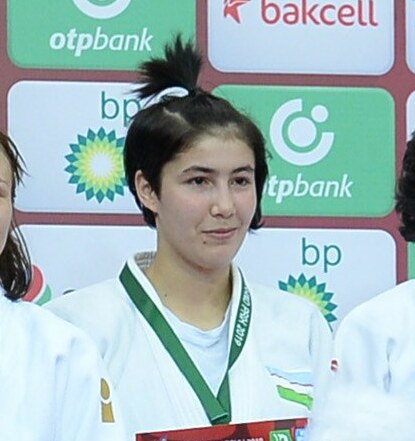

Personal information
- Born: 8 November 2001 (age 24)

Sport
- Country: Uzbekistan
- Sport: Paralympic judo
Medal record
Paralympic Games
Bronze medal – third place	2020 Tokyo	63 kg
Asian Para Games
Silver medal – second place	2018 Jakarta	57 kg

Nafisa Sheripboeva (born 8 November 2001) is an Uzbekistani Paralympic judoka. She won one of the bronze medals in the women's 63 kg event at the 2020 Summer Paralympics held in Tokyo, Japan.
