= Carolina Costa =

Italian Paralympic judoka

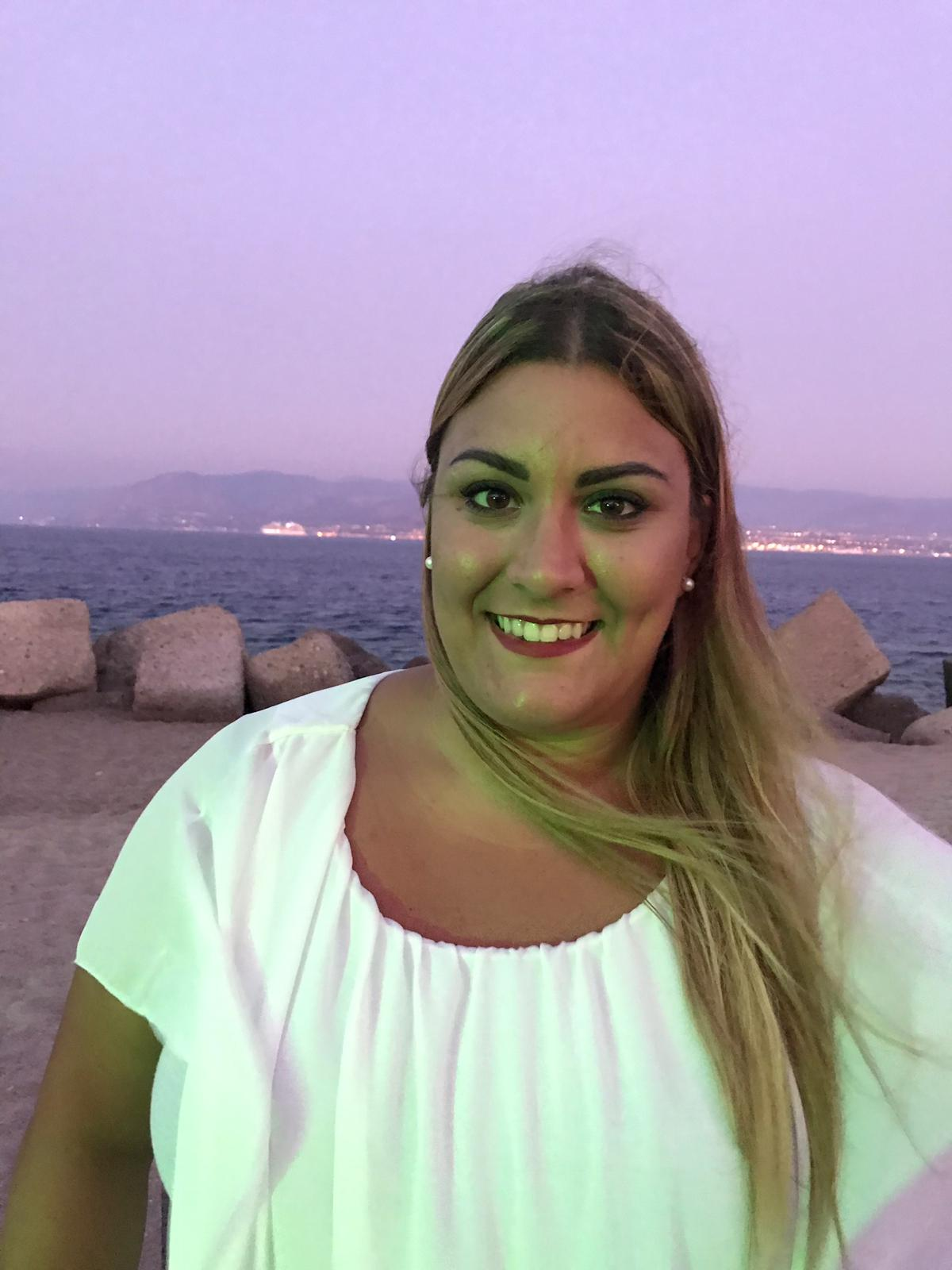
- Carolina Costa in 2019

Personal information
- Nationality: Italian
- Born: 25 August 1994 (age 32) Messina, Italy
- Occupation: Judoka

Sport
- Sport: Para judo
- Event: +70 kg
- Club: ASD Judo Franco Costa Messina
- Coached by: Vittorio Scimone
Medal record
Representing Italy
Women's Judo
Paralympic sport
Event	1st	2nd	3rd
Paralympics	0	0	1
IBSA World Championships	0	0	1
IBSA European Championships	1	0	0
Total	1	0	2

Profile at external databases
- JudoInside.com: 11568

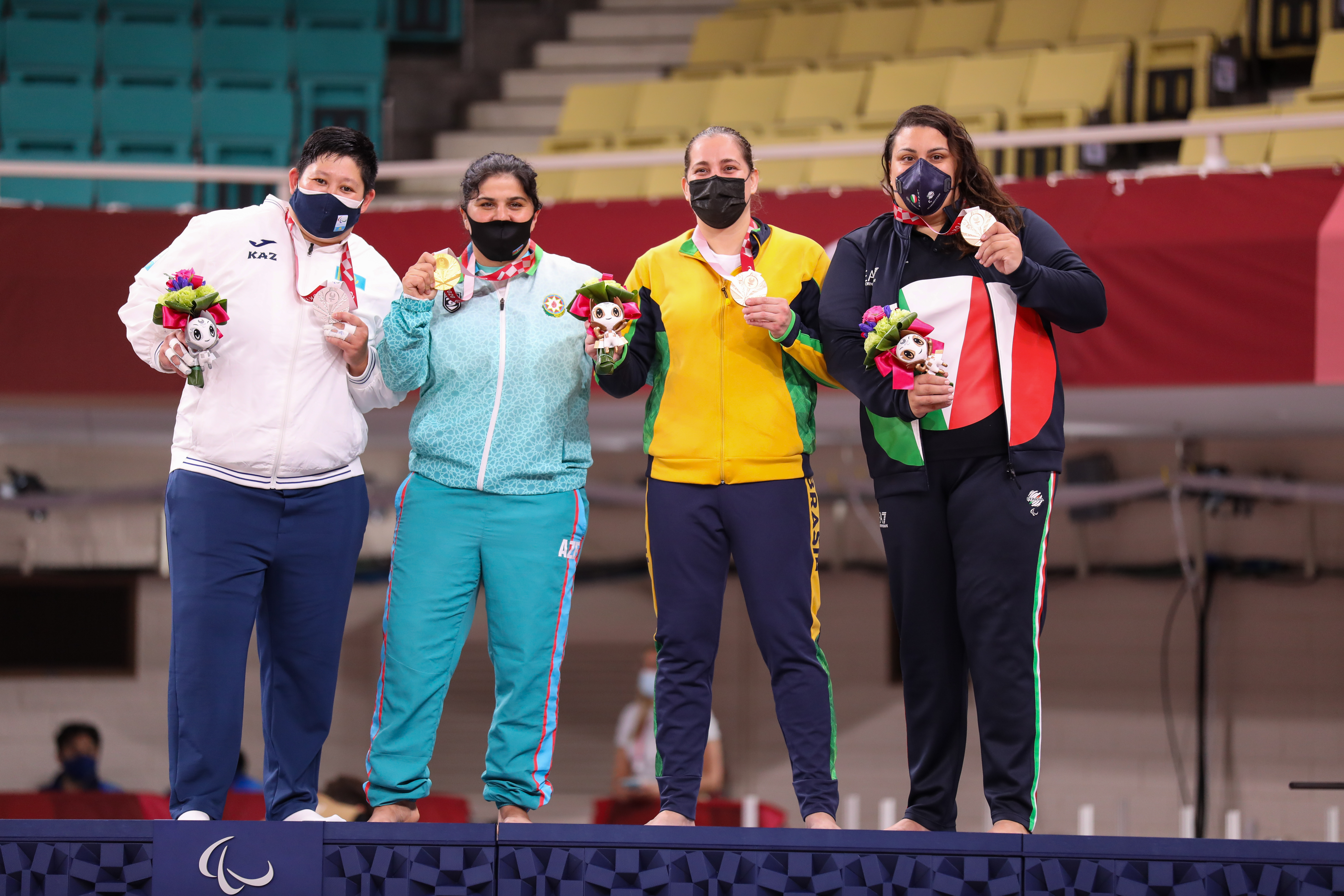
Carolina Costa (right) on the Tokyo 2020 podimum.

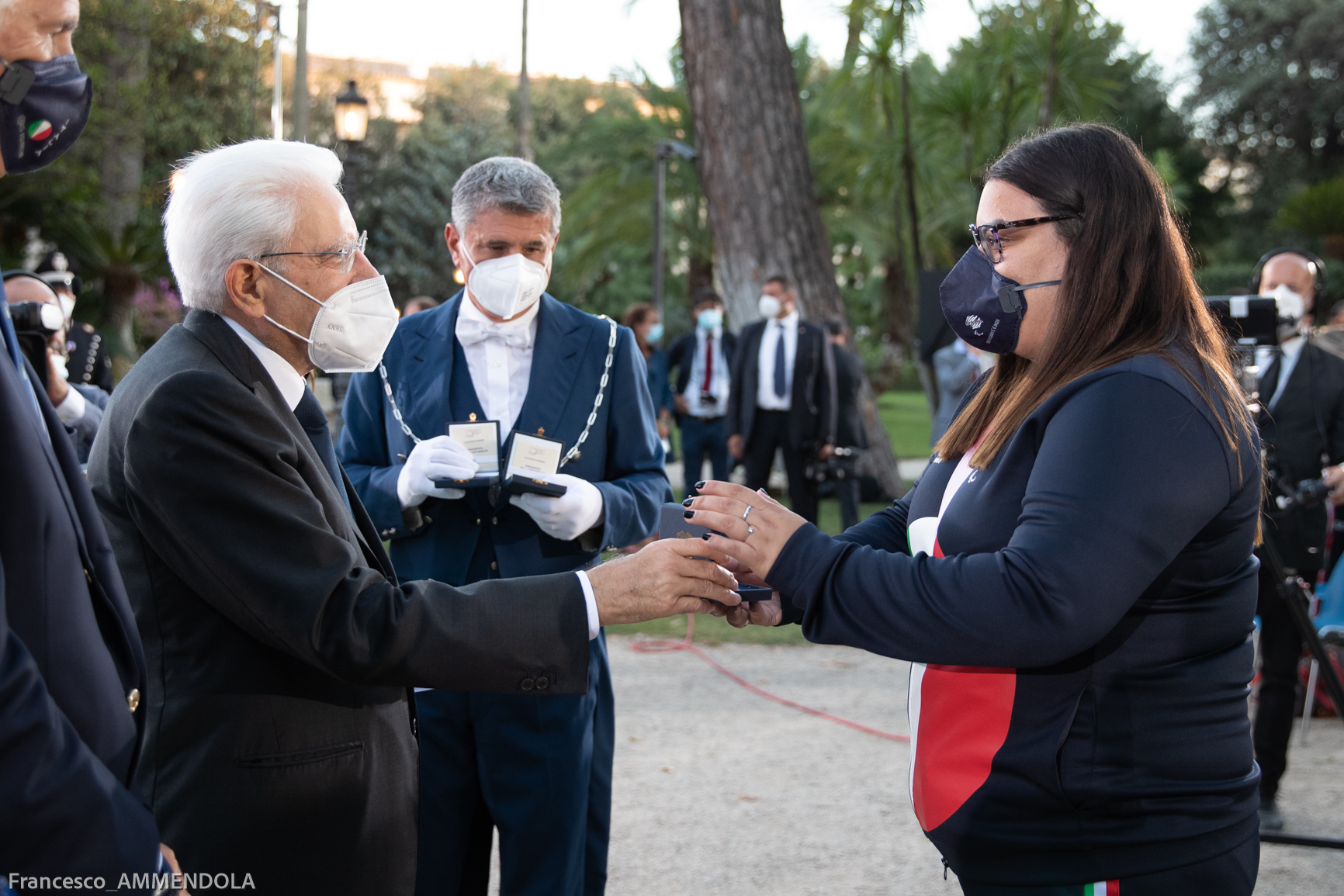
Costa awarded by Sergio Mattarella at Quirinale in 2021.

Carolina Costa (born 25 August 1994) is an Italian female judoka and paralympic athlete. She won one of the bronze medals in the women's +70 kg event at the 2020 Summer Paralympics held in Tokyo, Japan.

== Biography ==
Daughter of the Sicilian master Judo and president of the Italian Kendo Federation Franco Costa, who died in 2006, Carolina Costa began her under-23 judoka career in a very promising way with some brilliant results even at an absolute level, like a second place in the Italian championships.

In 2016, at the age of 22 she was diagnosed with keratoconus, a degenerative disease that if taken at a young age can lead to progressive blindness, therefore Carolina's performance is diminishing, it becomes necessary to switch to paralympic sport and here, however that, as a paralympic athlete, she achieves international results, like a bronze medal at the world championships and a gold medal at the European championships. These results give her the almost certainty of being able to represent Italy at the 2020 Summer Paralympics in Tokyo. She is the daughter of the Olympic former freestyle wrestler Katarzyna Juszczak.

== Achievements ==
Year	Competition	Venue	Position	Event	Notes
2018	IBSA World Championships	(Portugal) Lisbon	3rd	+70 kg	
2019	IBSA European Championships	(Italy) Genoa	1st	+70 kg	
2019	IBSA Judo Grand Prix	(Azerbaijan) Baku	1st	+70 kg	
2019	IBSA Judo International Qualifier	(United States) Fort Wayne	3rd	+70 kg	
2019	IBSA Judo Grand Prix	(Uzbekistan) Tashkent	1st	+70 kg	
2021	IBSA Judo Grand Prix	(Azerbaijan) Baku	2nd	+70 kg	
2021	IBSA Judo Grand Prix	(United Kingdom) Warwick	1st	+70 kg	
2021	Summer Paralympics	(Japan) Tokyo	3rd	+70 kg	
2024	Summer Paralympics	(France) Paris	5th	+70 kg	
2025	IBSA European Judo Championships	(Georgia (country)) Tbilisi	1st	+70 kg	

== See also ==
- International Blind Sports Federation
- FIJLKAM
