= Lúcia Teixeira =

Brazilian paralympic judoka

Lucia Teixeira
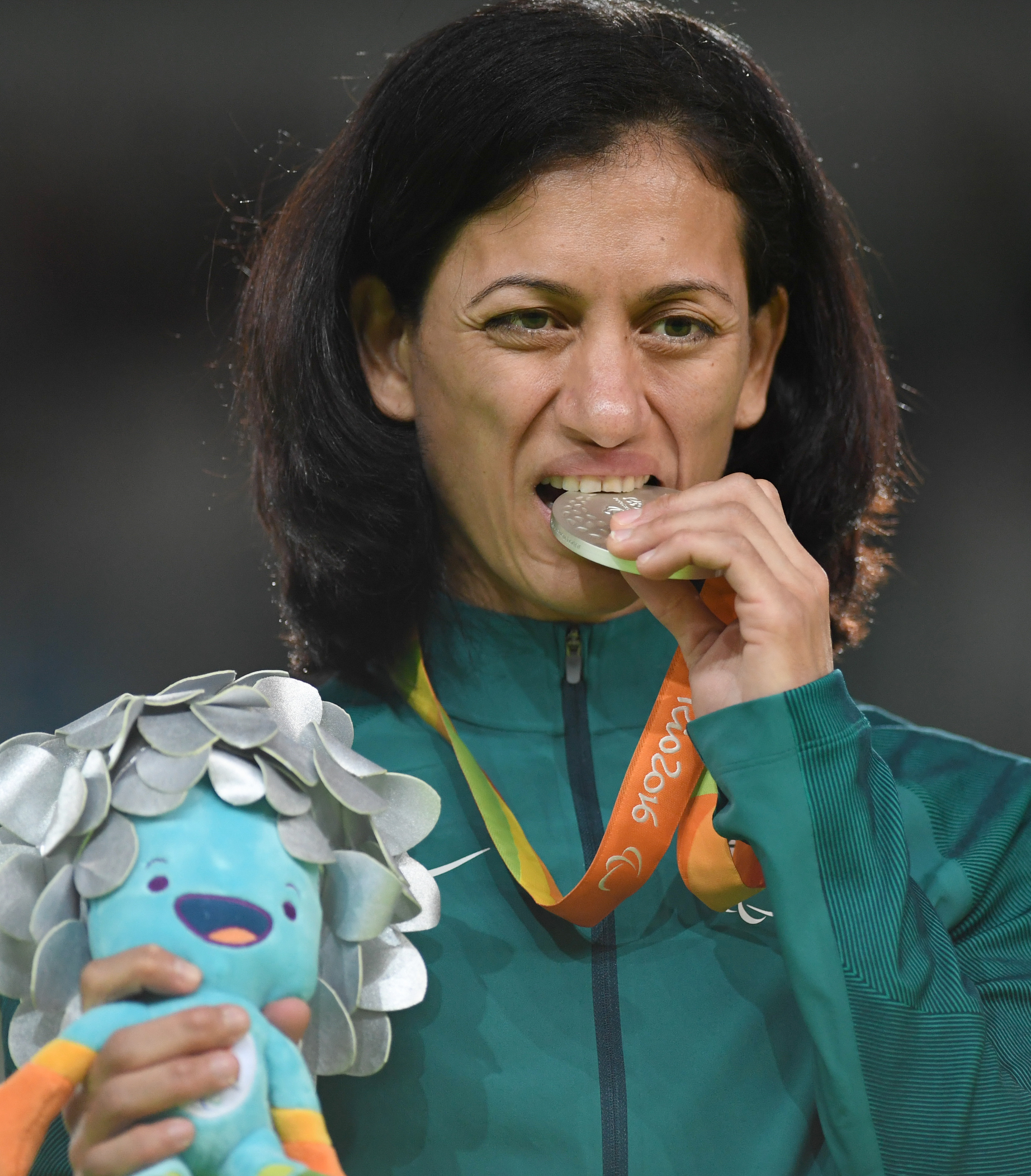
- Taking silver in Rio

Personal information
- Full name: Lúcia da Silva Teixeira Araújo
- Born: 17 June 1981 (age 45) São Paulo, Brazil
- Occupation: Judoka
- Height: 170 cm (5 ft 7 in)

Sport
- Country: Brazil
- Sport: Para judo
- Weight class: ‍–‍57 kg

Achievements and titles
- Paralympic Games: (silver) (2016, 2020)
Medal record
Women's para judo
Representing Brazil
Paralympic Games
Silver medal – second place	2012 London	‍–‍57 kg
Silver medal – second place	2016 Rio de Janeiro	‍–‍57 kg
Bronze medal – third place	2020 Tokyo	‍–‍57 kg
IBSA World Championships and Games
Silver medal – second place	2011 Antalya	‍–‍57 kg
Bronze medal – third place	2014 Colorado	‍–‍57 kg
Bronze medal – third place	2015 Seoul	‍–‍57 kg
Parapan American Games
Gold medal – first place	2015 Toronto	57 kg
Gold medal – first place	2019 Lima	57 kg
Gold medal – first place	2023 Santiago	57 kg
Silver medal – second place	2007 Rio de Janeiro	‍–‍70 kg

Profile at external databases
- IJF: 64999
- JudoInside.com: 116366
- Updated on 15 April 2025

Lúcia da Silva Teixeira Araújo (born 17 June 1981) is a Brazilian female visually impaired judoka (disability class B2) competing in the ‍–‍57 kg division. Teixeira took a silver medal in the 2012 Summer Paralympics and 2016 Summer Paralympics. In 2016, she was defeated by Inna Cherniak of Ukraine who took the gold medal. She won one of the bronze medals in the women's 57 kg event at the 2020 Summer Paralympics held in Tokyo, Japan.

== Life ==
In 2015, she was one of three Paralympic athletes who took part in a popular video that was intended to introduce Brazilians to the paralympics as a spectator sport. The video was shot with hidden cameras, and it records the reactions of spectators as the three paralympians as they enter three gyms as disabled people and they then impress observers with their abilities. The video attracted million of viewers and acquaintances who never recognised her as a silver medalist from London.
