= Parvina Samandarova =

Uzbekistani Paralympic judoka (born 2001)

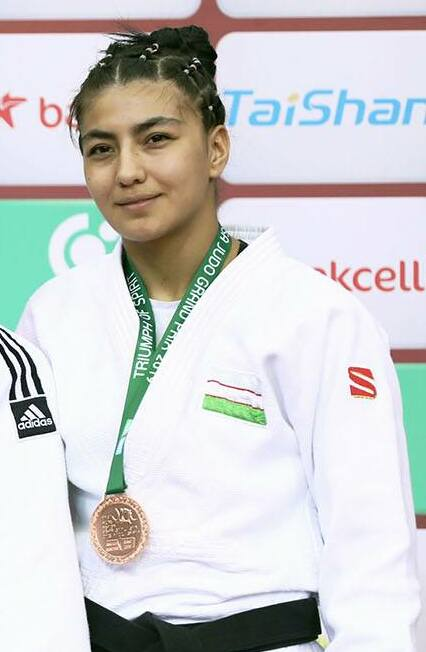

Personal information
- Born: 7 April 2001 (age 25)

Sport
- Country: Uzbekistan
- Sport: Paralympic judo
Medal record
Paralympic Games
Silver medal – second place	2020 Tokyo	57 kg
Asian Para Games
Bronze medal – third place	2018 Jakarta	63 kg

Parvina Samandarova (born 7 April 2001) is an Uzbekistani Paralympic judoka. She won the silver medal in the women's 57 kg event at the 2020 Summer Paralympics held in Tokyo, Japan.
