= Robert Tanaka =

American Paralympic judoka

Robert K. Tanaka Jr. PLY
Personal information
- Born: 11 January 2000 (age 26) Denver, Colorado, United States
- Education: M.S. Applied Economics and Econometrics B.S. Economics and Mathematics
- Weight: 66 X kg

Sport
- Country: United States
- Sport: Paralympic judo
- Disability: Albinism
- Disability class: B3
- Club: Ju Shin Kan Judo Academy, Denver Judo, Denver Buddhist Temple Judo Dojo, Sawtelle Judo Dojo
- Coached by: Stephen Moore, Heidi Moore, Paul Truong, Kenji Osugi
- Retired: 2021
Medal record
Paralympic judo
Representing United States
IBSA Pan Am Judo Championships
Bronze medal – third place	2020 Montreal	Men's -66kg

Robert Kazuo Tanaka Jr. (born January 11, 2000) is a Paralympic judoka and represented Team USA in the 2020 Tokyo Summer Paralympic Games. Tanaka is a 2020 IBSA Pan American bronze medalist and finished top 5 in both the 2018 IBSA World Games (Lisbon, Portugal) and the 2019 IBSA World Games (Fort Wayne, Indiana).

Tanaka was born with albinism, the cause of his visual impairment. Originally from Denver, Tanaka started Judo at the age of 5 at Denver Judo. His coaches, Heidi and Scoot Moore, would go on to sit in his coaching chair in the 2020 Paralympic Games. Throughout his career, he also trained at Denver Buddhist Judo Dojo, Ju Shin Kan Judo Academy (Paul Truong), and Sawtelle Judo Dojo (Kenji Osugi).

After the Tokyo Games, Tanaka was retired from Para Judo as he no longer classified under the new IBSA vision classifications for Paris 2024.
