= Namig Abasli =

Azerbaijani Paralympic judoka (born 1997)

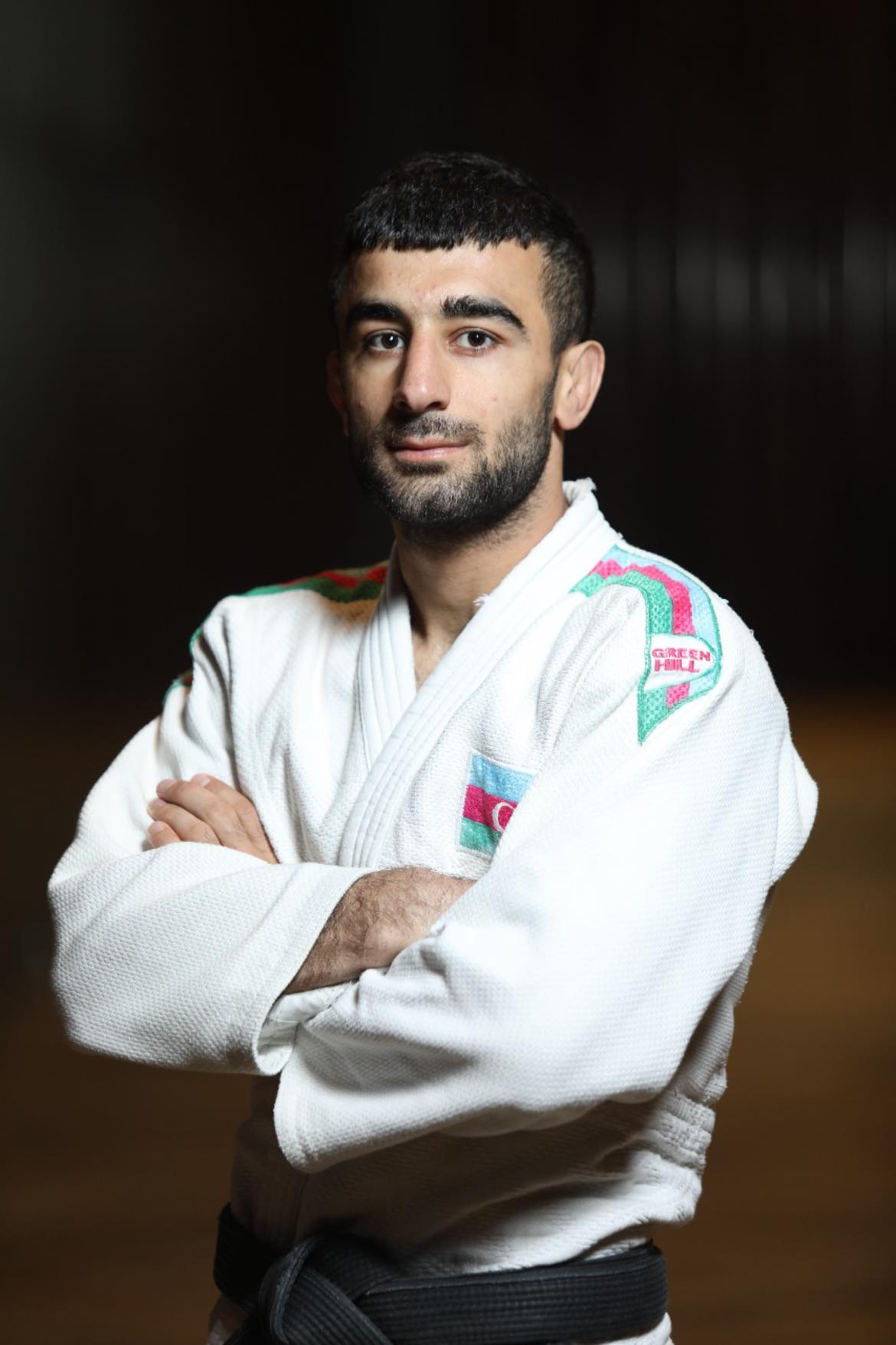

Personal information
- Born: 12 September 1997 (age 28)
- Occupation: Judoka

Sport
- Country: Azerbaijan
- Sport: Para judo
Medal record
Paralympic Games
Bronze medal – third place	2020 Tokyo	66 kg
European Para Championships
Silver medal – second place	2023 Rotterdam	73 kg J2

Profile at external databases
- IJF: 38453
- JudoInside.com: 126108

Namig Abasli (born 12 September 1997) is an Azerbaijani Paralympic judoka. He won one of the bronze medals in the men's 66 kg event at the 2020 Summer Paralympics held in Tokyo.
