= Yujiro Seto =

Japanese Paralympic judoka (born 2000)

Personal information
- Born: 20 January 2000 (age 26) Itoshima, Fukuoka, Japan

Sport
- Country: Japan
- Sport: Paralympic judo
Medal record
Men's para judo
Representing Japan
Paralympic Games
Gold medal – first place	2024 Paris	73 kg
Bronze medal – third place	2020 Tokyo	66 kg
Asian Para Games
Bronze medal – third place	2022 Hangzhou	73 kg
Bronze medal – third place	2026 Aichi–Nagoya	70 kg

Yujiro Seto (瀬戸 勇次郎, Seto Yūjirō; born 27 January 2000) is a Japanese Paralympic judoka. He won one of the bronze medals in the men's 66 kg event at the 2020 Summer Paralympics held in Tokyo, Japan.
