= Pipo Carlomagno =

Argentinian paralympic swimmer

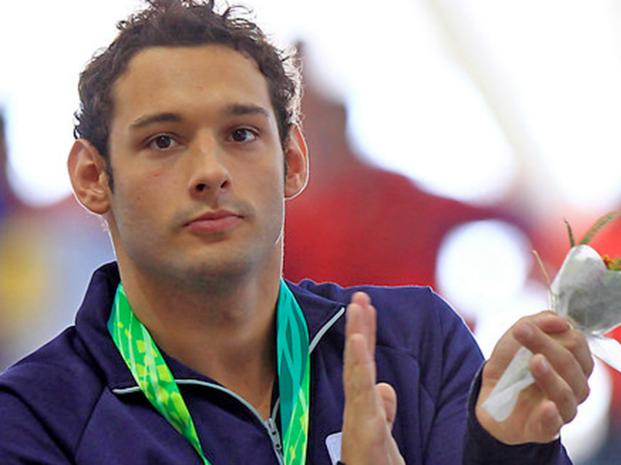

Personal information
- Nationality: Argentinian
- Born: 13 August 1993 (age 32) Rosario, Argentina

Sport
- Sport: Paralympic swimming
- Disability: Cerebral palsy
- Disability class: S7, SB6, SM7
- Club: Echesortu Futbol Club
- Coached by: Gustavo D'Andrea
Medal record
Men's paralympic swimming
Representing Argentina
Paralympic Games
Silver medal – second place	2020 Tokyo	100 m freestyle S7
World Championships
Silver medal – second place	2017 Mexico City	100 m backstroke S8
Bronze medal – third place	2019 London	100 m backstroke S7
Bronze medal – third place	2022 Madeira	100 m backstroke S8
Parapan American Games
Gold medal – first place	2015 Toronto	100 m backstroke S8
Silver medal – second place	2015 Toronto	100 m breaststroke SB7
Bronze medal – third place	2011 Guadalajara	100 m freestyle S8
Bronze medal – third place	2015 Toronto	4×100 m freestyle relay 34pts

Pipo Carlomagno (born 13 August 1993) is an Argentinian Paralympic swimmer who represented Argentina at the Paralympic Games.

== Career ==
Carlomagno represented Argentina in the men's 100 metre backstroke S7 event at the 2020 Summer Paralympics and won a silver medal.

== Personal life ==
His father, Fernando, represented Argentina in swimming and competed at the Paralympic Games in 1996, 2000 and 2004.
