= Lenia Ruvalcaba =

Mexican visually-impaired judoka

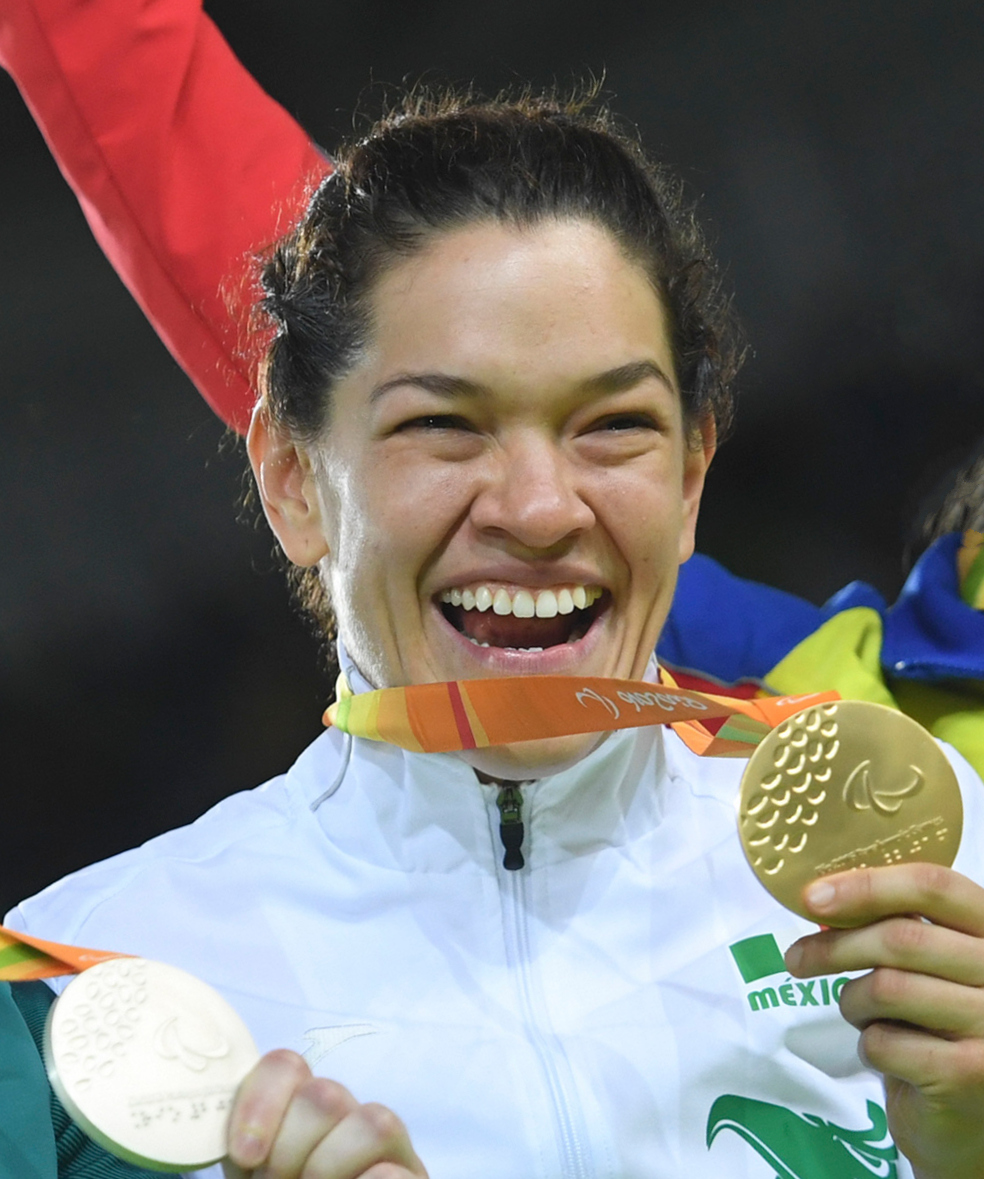
- Ruvalcaba at the 2016 Olympics

Personal information
- Full name: Lenia Fabiola Ruvalcaba Álvarez
- Born: 23 April 1986 (age 40) Guadalajara, Mexico
- Occupation: Judoka

Sport
- Sport: Judo
Medal record
Representing Mexico
Paralympic Games
Gold medal – first place	2016 Rio de Janeiro	70 kg
Silver medal – second place	2008 Beijing	-70 kg
Bronze medal – third place	2020 Tokyo	-70 kg
Parapan American Games
Gold medal – first place	2015 Toronto	-70 kg
Gold medal – first place	2019 Lima	-70kg
Silver medal – second place	2011 Guadalajara	-70 kg
IBSA World Championships and Games
Bronze medal – third place	2014 Colorado	-70 kg

Profile at external databases
- JudoInside.com: 30987

Lenia Fabiola Ruvalcaba Álvarez (born 23 April 1986) is a Mexican visually-impaired judoka. Competing in the 70 kg division she won a silver medal at the 2008 Paralympics and a gold at the 2016 Rio Games. Ruvalcaba also took part in regular judo competitions and won a team bronze medal at the 2010 Central American and Caribbean Games. In 2011, she participated both at the Pan American and Parapan American Games.

By earning gold in Rio, Ruvalcaba became the first Mexican female to win an Olympic or Paralympic judo tournament.

Ruvalcaba won one of the bronze medals in the women's 70 kg event at the 2020 Summer Paralympics held in Tokyo, Japan.
