= Judo at the 2016 Summer Paralympics – Men's 90 kg =

Judo competition

Judo – Men's 90 kg at the XV Paralympic Games
- Venue: Carioca Arena 3
- Date: 10 September 2016
- Competitors: 11 from 11 nations

Medalists
1st place, gold medalist(s)		Zviad Gogotchuri	Georgia
2nd place, silver medalist(s)		Oleksandr Nazarenko	Ukraine
3rd place, bronze medalist(s)		Shukhrat Boboev	Uzbekistan
3rd place, bronze medalist(s)		Dartanyon Crockett	United States

The men's 90 kg judo competition at the 2016 Summer Paralympics was held on 10 September at Carioca Arena 3.

== Results ==
Round of 16
Jorge Hierrezuelo Marcillis (CUB)	001^{1}
Haruka Hirose (JPN)	000^{1}
Abel Vázquez Cortijo (ESP)	000
Arthur Cavalcante da Silva (BRA)	101
Tony Walby (CAN)	DQ
Jorge Daniel Lancina (ARG)

Quarterfinals
Sam Ingram (GBR)	001
Jorge Hierrezuelo Marcillis (CUB)	100
Oleksandr Nazarenko (UKR)	100
Arthur Cavalcante da Silva (BRA)	000
Zviad Gogotchuri (GEO)
Jorge Daniel Lancina (ARG)	DQ
Shukhrat Boboev (UZB)	001
Dartanyon Crockett (USA)	011

Semifinals
Jorge Hierrezuelo Marcillis (CUB)	000^{2}
Oleksandr Nazarenko (UKR)	000^{1}
Zviad Gogotchuri (GEO)	101
Dartanyon Crockett (USA)	000

Final
Oleksandr Nazarenko (UKR)	000
Zviad Gogotchuri (GEO)	100

=== Repechage ===
Repechage Round 1
Haruka Hirose (JPN)	000
Sam Ingram (GBR)	100

Repechage Finals
Sam Ingram (GBR)	100
Arthur Cavalcante da Silva (BRA)	000
Jorge Daniel Lancina (ARG)	000
Shukhrat Boboev (UZB)	010

Bronze Medal Matches
Sam Ingram (GBR)	000
Dartanyon Crockett (USA)	002
Shukhrat Boboev (UZB)	101
Jorge Hierrezuelo Marcillis (CUB)	000
