= Moldova at the 2020 Summer Paralympics =

- IPC code: MDA
- NPC: Paralympic Committee of Moldova

in Tokyo
- Competitors: 6 in 3 sports
- Flag bearers: Oleg Crețul; Larisa Marinenkova
- Medals: Gold 0 Silver 0 Bronze 0 Total 0

Summer Paralympics appearances (overview)
- 1996; 2000; 2004; 2008; 2012; 2016; 2020; 2024

Other related appearances
- Soviet Union (1988); Unified Team (1992)

Moldova sent a delegation to participate at the 2020 Summer Paralympics in Tokyo, Japan, from 24 August to 5 September 2021. This was the Eastern European's country Seventh appearance in the Summer Paralympic Games since their debut twenty four years prior at the 1996 Summer Paralympics. Moldova sent six athletes to these Games, shot put thrower Oxana Spataur and Vladimir Butucea, powerlifter Larisa Marinenkova and Denis Raiul, Judo Player Oleg Creţul and Ion Basoc.

== Background ==
Moldova first appeared in Paralympic competition at the 1996 Summer Paralympics. They have competed in every Summer Paralympic Games since, making Tokyo its Seventh appearance at a Summer Paralympiad. They have never participated in the Winter Paralympic Games, but have won two medals (one each in athletics and table tennis) at the Summer Paralympics. The 2020 Summer Paralympics were held from 24 August to 5 September 2021 with a total of 4403 athletes representing 162 National Paralympic Committees taking part.

== Disability classification ==
Every participant at the Paralympics has their disability grouped into one of five disability categories; amputation, the condition may be congenital or sustained through injury or illness; cerebral palsy; wheelchair athletes, there is often overlap between this and other categories; visual impairment, including blindness; Les autres, any physical disability that does not fall strictly under one of the other categories, for example dwarfism or multiple sclerosis. Each Paralympic sport then has its own classifications, dependent upon the specific physical demands of competition. Events are given a code, made of numbers and letters, describing the type of event and classification of the athletes competing. Some sports, such as athletics, divide athletes by both the category and severity of their disabilities, other sports, for example swimming, group competitors from different categories together, the only separation being based on the severity of the disability.

== Competitors ==
The following is the list of number of competitors participating in the Games:

Sport	Men	Women	Total
Athletics	1	1	2
Judo	2	0	2
Powerlifting	1	1	2
Total	4	2	6

== Athletics ==
=== Field Events — Men ===
Athlete	Events	Result	Rank
Vladimir Butucea	Shot Put F12	11.62 PB	8

=== Field Events — Women ===
Athlete	Events	Result	Rank
Oxana Spataru	Shot Put F40	5.85 PB	8

== Judo ==
Athlete	Event	Preliminaries	Quarterfinals	Semifinals	Repechage First round	Repechage Final	Final / BM	
Athlete	Event	Opposition Result	Opposition Result	Opposition Result	Opposition Result	Opposition Result	Opposition Result	Rank
Oleg Crețul	Men's 90 kg	Yerlan (KAZ); L 00–01	did not advance					
Ion Basoc	Men's 100 kg	Shukhrat (UZB); W 01–00	Antônio (BRA); L 00–10	Anatolii (RPC); L 00–10	did not advance			

== Powerlifting ==
=== Men ===
Athlete	Event	Result	Rank
Denis Raiul	90 kg	172	8

=== Women ===
Athlete	Event	Result	Rank
Larisa Marinenkova	73 kg	82	8

== See also ==
- Moldova at the 2020 Summer Olympics
