= Judo at the 2012 Summer Paralympics – Men's 90 kg =

Judo competition

Judo – Men's 90 kg at the XIV Paralympic Games
- Venue: ExCeL London
- Date: 1 September 2012
- Competitors: 12 from 12 nations

Medalists
1st place, gold medalist(s)		Jorge Hierrezuelo Marcillis	Cuba
2nd place, silver medalist(s)		Sam Ingram	Great Britain
3rd place, bronze medalist(s)		Jorge Lencina	Argentina
3rd place, bronze medalist(s)		Dartanyon Crockett	United States

The men's 90 kg judo competition at the 2012 Summer Paralympics was held on 1 September at ExCeL London.

== Results ==
=== Gold Medal Contest ===
Semifinals
1	J H-Marcillis (CUB)	100
4	O Kretsul (RUS)	000
3	S Ingram (GBR)	0101
2	J Lencina (ARG)	0003

Final
J H-Marcillis (CUB)	001
S Ingram (GBR)	000

=== Bronze Medal Contest ===
==== Contest A ====
Repechage contest		Finals of Repechage		Bronze Medal Contest
O Pominov (UKR)	0001
G Dashtseren (MGL)	0110	G Dashtseren (MGL)	000
A González Tapia (MEX)	000	H Asakereh (IRI)	100
H Asakereh (IRI)	100			H Asakereh (IRI)	0001
				J Lencina (ARG)	100

==== Contest B ====
Finals of Repechage
D Crockett (USA)	0201
JB Santos (BRA)	0001

Bronze Medal Contest
D Crockett (USA)	100
O Kretsul (RUS)	000

=== Table Contest ===
==== Table A ====
Preliminaries
J H-Marcillis (CUB)	101
O Pominov (UKR)	0001
O Kretsul (RUS)	100
A González Tapia (MEX)	000

Quarterfinals
J H-Marcillis (CUB)	100
G Dashtseren (MGL)	000
O Kretsul (RUS)	100
H Asakereh (IRI)	0001

Semifinals
J H-Marcillis (CUB)	100
O Kretsul (RUS)	000

==== Table B ====
Preliminaries
D Crockett (USA)	0011
O Cugnon de Sevricourt (FRA)	000
T Mammadov (AZE)	0002
JB Santos (BRA)	001

Quarterfinals
D Crockett (USA)	000
S Ingram (GBR)	100
JB Santos (BRA)	000
J Lencina (ARG)	100

Semifinals
S Ingram (GBR)	0101
J Lencina (ARG)	0003
