= Judo at the 2020 Summer Paralympics – Men's 90 kg =

Judo – Men's 90 kg at the XVI Paralympic Games
- Venue: Nippon Budokan
- Date: 29 August 2021
- Competitors: 11 from 11 nations

Medalists
1st place, gold medalist(s)		Vahid Nouri	Iran
2nd place, silver medalist(s)		Elliot Stewart	Great Britain
3rd place, bronze medalist(s)		Hélios Latchoumanaya	France
3rd place, bronze medalist(s)		Oleksandr Nazarenko	Ukraine

The men's 90 kg judo competition at the 2020 Summer Paralympics was held on 29 August 2021 at the Nippon Budokan.

== Results ==
=== Bracket ===
Round of 16
Vladimir Fedin (RPC)	01
Zhanbota Amanzhol (KAZ)	11
Shukhrat Boboev (UZB)	01
Oleg Crețul (MDA)	00
~~Hector Espinoza (VEN)~~
Arthur Cavalcante (BRA)	Bye
Haruka Hirose (JPN)	10
Abderrahmane Chetouane (ALG)	00

Quarterfinals
Oleksandr Nazarenko (UKR)	10
Zhanbota Amanzhol (KAZ)	00
Elliot Stewart (GBR)	10
Shukhrat Boboev (UZB)	00
Vahid Nouri (IRI)	10
Arthur Cavalcante (BRA)	00
Hélios Latchoumanaya (FRA)	10
Haruka Hirose (JPN)	00

Semifinals
Oleksandr Nazarenko (UKR)	00
Elliot Stewart (GBR)	01
Vahid Nouri (IRI)	01
Hélios Latchoumanaya (FRA)	00

Final
Elliot Stewart (GBR)	00
Vahid Nouri (IRI)	10

=== Repechage ===
Repechage
Zhanbota Amanzhol (KAZ)	Bye
Shukhrat Boboev (UZB)

Bronze medal
Zhanbota Amanzhol (KAZ)	00
Hélios Latchoumanaya (FRA)	10

Repechage
Arthur Cavalcante (BRA)	10
Haruka Hirose (JPN)	00

Bronze medal
Arthur Cavalcante (BRA)	00
Oleksandr Nazarenko (UKR)	10
