= Moldova at the 2024 Summer Paralympics =

- Flag of Moldova
- IPC code: MDA
- NPC: Paralympic Committee of Moldova

in Paris, France August 28, 2024 – September 8, 2024
- Competitors: 5 (3 men and 2 women) in 3 sports
- Flag bearers: Larisa Marinenkova; Gheorghe Spinu
- Medals Ranked 73rd: Gold 0 Silver 1 Bronze 1 Total 2

Summer Paralympics appearances (overview)
- 1996; 2000; 2004; 2008; 2012; 2016; 2020; 2024

Other related appearances
- Soviet Union (1988); Unified Team (1992)

Moldova competed at the 2024 Summer Paralympics in Paris, France, from 28 August to 8 September.

== Medalists ==
Medal	Name	Sport	Event	Date
Silver	Ion Basoc	Judo	Men's +90 kg J1	7 September
Bronze	Oleg Crețul	Judo	Men's 90 kg J1	7 September

=== Medals by sport ===
Medals by sport
Sport	1st place, gold medalist(s)	2nd place, silver medalist(s)	3rd place, bronze medalist(s)	Total
Judo	0	1	1	2
Total	0	1	1	2

=== Medals by gender ===
Medals by gender
Gender	1st place, gold medalist(s)	2nd place, silver medalist(s)	3rd place, bronze medalist(s)	Total
Female	0	0	0	0
Male	0	1	1	2
Mixed	0	0	0	0
Total	0	1	1	2

=== Medals by date ===
Medals by date
Date	1st place, gold medalist(s)	2nd place, silver medalist(s)	3rd place, bronze medalist(s)	Total
7 September	0	1	1	2
Total	0	1	1	2

== Competitors ==
The following is the list of number of competitors in the Games.

Sport	Men	Women	Total
Athletics	1	0	1
Judo	2	1	3
Powerlifting	0	1	1
Total	3	2	5

== Athletics ==
Key

- Note–Ranks given for track events are within the athlete's heat only
- Q = Qualified for the next round
- q = Qualified for the next round as a fastest loser or, in field events, by position without achieving the qualifying target
- DQ = Disqualified
- PR = Paralympic Record
- AR = Area (or continental) Record
- NR = National Record
- SB = Season's Best
- N/A = Round not applicable for the event
- Bye = Athlete not required to compete in round

Field events
Men

Athlete	Event	Qualification		Final	
Athlete	Event	Result	Rank	Result	Rank
Gheorghe Spînu	Men's shot put F35	—N/a		9.62	8

== Judo ==
Athlete	Event	Round of 16	Quarterfinals	Semifinals	Repechage round 1	Repechage round 2	Final/ BM	
Athlete	Event	Opposition Result	Opposition Result	Opposition Result	Opposition Result	Opposition Result	Opposition Result	Rank
Ion Basoc	Men's + 90 kg J1	—N/a	Knegt (NED); W 10–0	Grandry (FRA); W 10–0	—N/a	—N/a	Silva (BRA); L 0–10	2nd place, silver medalist(s)
Oleg Crețul	Men's 90 kg J1	Bye	Jonard (FRA); L 0–1	Bye	Al-Gburi (IRQ); W 10–0	Gholamishafia (IRI); W 10–0	Cimciler (TUR); W 10–1	3rd place, bronze medalist(s)
Ina Cernei	Women's 57 kg J1							

== Powerlifting ==
Athlete	Event	Attempts (kg)				Result (kg)	Rank
Athlete	Event	1	2	3	4	Result (kg)	Rank
Women
Larisa Marinenkova	Women's 73 kg				82	7	

== See also ==
- Moldova at the 2024 Summer Olympics
- Moldova at the Paralympics
