= Moldova at the 2008 Summer Paralympics =

- IPC code: MDA
- NPC: Paralympic Committee of Moldova

in Beijing
- Competitors: 1 in 1 sport
- Flag bearer: Larisa Marinenkova
- Medals: Gold 0 Silver 0 Bronze 0 Total 0

Summer Paralympics appearances (overview)
- 1996; 2000; 2004; 2008; 2012; 2016; 2020; 2024

Other related appearances
- Soviet Union (1988); Unified Team (1992)

Ukraine participated at the 2008 Summer Paralympics held in Beijing, China, held between 6 and 17 September 2008. The country's participation in the Games marked its fourth appearance at the Summer Paralympics since its debut in the 1996 Games.

The Moldovan team consisted of a lone athlete Larisa Marinenkova who competed in para powerlifting. Marinenkova also served as the flag-bearer during the opening ceremony. Moldova did not win any medals in the Games.

== Background ==
Moldova achieved independence after the break-up of Soviet Union in 1991. Moldavan athletes competed from 1952 to 1988 as a part of Soviet Union. The 1994 Winter Olympics marked Moldova's first participation as an independent nation in the Olympic Games. The Paralympic Committee of Moldova was formed only in 1996 under the leadership of Paralympic medalist Vladimir Polkanov.

Moldova made its Summer Paralympics debut at the 1996 Paralympics, in which it won two medals. Since the country's participation in the 1996 Games, the 2008 Summer Paralympics marked its fourth appearance at the Summer Paralympic Games. The Paralympic Committee of Moldova is organizing body for the Summer Paralympics in Moldova.

The Games were held in Beijing, China, between 6 and 17 September 2008. A record 3,952 Para athletes (2,585 men and 1,367 women) from 146 countries took part in 472 medal events across 20 sports. Larisa Marinenkova who competed in para powerlifting, served as the flag-bearer during the opening ceremony. Moldova won no medals in the event.

== Competitors ==
The Moldovan delegation consisted of a single competitor Larisa Marinenkova, who competed in the powerlifting event.

| Sport | Men | Women | Athletes |
|---|---|---|---|
| Powerlifting | 0 | 1 | 1 |
| Total | 0 | 1 | 1 |

== Powerlifting ==
Para powerlifting is open to only athletes who have an impairment in their lower limbs or hips that meets the minimum impairment criteria. While the athletes might be classified into one of the eight eligible physical impairments, the competitions are held based on gender and weight classes.

Larisa Marinenkova represented Romania in the powerlifting competition. This was Marinenkova's debut in the Paralympic Games in the para powerlifting competition. She would go on to represent Moldova continuously in the next four Paralympic Games from 2012 to 2024. In the event, Marinenkova lifted a weight of 77.5 kg (171 lb). She trailed the gold medalist Taoying Fu of China by 67.5 kg (149 lb) and was classified last amongst the eight finishers in the event.

| Athlete | Event | Result | Rank |
|---|---|---|---|
| Larisa Marinenkova | Women's -67.5 kg | 77.5 | 8 |

== See also ==
- 2008 Summer Paralympics
- Moldova at the Paralympics
- Moldova at the 2008 Summer Olympics
