= Moldova at the 2016 Summer Paralympics =

- IPC code: MDA
- NPC: Paralympic Committee of Moldova

in Rio de Janeiro
- Competitors: 3 in 3 sports
- Flag bearer: Larisa Marinenkova
- Medals: Gold 0 Silver 0 Bronze 0 Total 0

Summer Paralympics appearances (overview)
- 1996; 2000; 2004; 2008; 2012; 2016; 2020; 2024

Other related appearances
- Soviet Union (1988); Unified Team (1992)

Moldova sent a delegation to participate at the 2016 Summer Paralympics in Rio de Janeiro, Brazil, from 7 to 18 September 2016. This was the Eastern European's country sixth appearance in the Summer Paralympic Games since their debut twenty years prior at the 1996 Summer Paralympics. Moldova sent three athletes to these Games, shot put thrower Oxana Spataur, powerlifter Larisa Marinenkova and short-distance swimmer Alexandr Covaliov. Spataur qualified on merit and Covaliov and Marienkova were invited by the Bipartite Commission. Neither Spataur or Covaliov advanced out of the heats of their events and Marienkova finished seventh in the women's 73kg powerlifting category.

== Background ==
Moldova first appeared in Paralympic competition at the 1996 Summer Paralympics. They have competed in every Summer Paralympic Games since, making Rio de Janeiro its sixth appearance at a Summer Paralympiad. They have never participated in the Winter Paralympic Games, but have won two medals (one each in athletics and table tennis) at the Summer Paralympics. The 2016 Summer Paralympics were held from 7–18 September 2016 with a total of 4,328 athletes representing 159 National Paralympic Committees taking part. Shot put thrower Oxana Spataur, powerlifter Larisa Marinenkova and short-distance swimmer Alexandr Covaliov were the three athletes selected by Moldova to compete in Rio de Janeiro. They travelled to Brazil on 2 September. Marinenkova was selected as the flag bearer for the parade of nations during the opening ceremony.

== Disability classification ==
Every participant at the Paralympics has their disability grouped into one of five disability categories; amputation, the condition may be congenital or sustained through injury or illness; cerebral palsy; wheelchair athletes, there is often overlap between this and other categories; visual impairment, including blindness; Les autres, any physical disability that does not fall strictly under one of the other categories, for example dwarfism or multiple sclerosis. Each Paralympic sport then has its own classifications, dependent upon the specific physical demands of competition. Events are given a code, made of numbers and letters, describing the type of event and classification of the athletes competing. Some sports, such as athletics, divide athletes by both the category and severity of their disabilities, other sports, for example swimming, group competitors from different categories together, the only separation being based on the severity of the disability.

== Athletics ==
Oxana Spataru was 18 years old at the time of the Rio Summer Paralympic Games and the youngest athlete to compete for Moldova. These Rio Summer Games were her first time competing in the Paralympic movement. Spataru's disability is congenital; she is of short stature, measuring 1.23 m (4.0 ft) tall, and took up powerlifting at the age of 14. She qualified for the Paralympics by finishing fourth in the women's shot put competition at the 2016 IPC Athletics European Championships. Spataru trained for the Paralympics in a gymnasium at a specialist school. On 11 September, Spataru participated in the women's shot put F40 category. She recorded marks of 4.02 m (13.2 ft), 3.93 m (12.9 ft) and 3.88 m (12.7 ft), the first of which was a personal best for Spataru and it ranked her tenth and last out of all the competing athletes.

=== Field Events — Women ===
Athlete	Events	Result	Rank
Oxana Spataru	Shot Put F40	4.02	10 PB

== Powerlifting ==
At the age of 39, Larisa Marinenkova was the oldest athlete to represent Moldova at the Rio Paralympics. She was competing in the Paralympic Games for the third time, having represented Moldova at the 2008 Summer Olympics and the 2012 Summer Paralympics. Marinenkvoa has been affected by cerebral palsy since childhood, resulting in permanent muscle weakness, and works as an engineer at a state-owned enterprise. She attained qualification to the Games by the Paralympic Committee of Moldova being granted an invitation for Marinenkova by the Bipartite Commission to allow her to compete after she did not meet the qualifying standards for powerlifting. Marinenkova said that she had "great expectations" for her performance and she wanted to improve on her non-finish from the 2012 Paralympic Games. On 12 September, she competed in the women's 73kg powerlifting category. Marinenkova failed to lift 80 kg (180 lb) at her first attempt but succeeded on the second try. She lifted 90 kg (200 lb) on her third attempt and this put her seventh and last out of all competitors.

=== Women ===
Athlete	Event	Result	Rank
Larisa Marinenkova	–73 kg	90.0	7

== Swimming ==
Alexandr Covaliov was taking part in his first Summer Paralympic Games and he was the sole male athlete to compete on Moldova's behalf in Rio. He was aged 32 at the time of the Games. He lost his vision in an accident that burned his eyes at the age of 16 and he took up swimming to aid in his recovery. Covaliov qualified for the Paralympics by receiving an invitation from the Bipartite Commission. On 12 September, he took part in the men's 50 metres freestyle S11 category. Assigned to heat one, Covaliov completed the race in 33.30 seconds, which put him eighth and last out of all swimmers in his heat. As only the top eight advanced to the final, he was eliminated because he came sixteenth and last overall. Three days later, Covaliov participated in the men's 100 metre freestyle S11 class and was drawn to heat two. He finished seventh and last with a time of 1 minute and 18.06 seconds. This ranked Covaliov 13th and last overall and his competition came to an end since the competition's format allowed only the top four in its two heats to progress to the final.

=== Men ===
Athletes	Event	Heat		Final	
Athletes	Event	Time	Rank	Time	Rank
Alexandr Covaliov	50 m freestyle S11	33.30	16	Did not qualify	
Alexandr Covaliov	100 m freestyle S11	1:18.06	13	did not advance	

== See also ==
- Moldova at the 2016 Summer Olympics
