= Moldova at the Paralympics =

- IPC code: MDA
- NPC: Paralympic Committee of Moldova
- Medals: Gold 0 Silver 1 Bronze 3 Total 4

Summer appearances
- 1996; 2000; 2004; 2008; 2012; 2016; 2020; 2024

Other related appearances
- Soviet Union (1988); Unified Team (1992)

Moldova, following its independence from the Soviet Union in 1991, made its Paralympic Games début at the 1996 Summer Paralympics in Atlanta, where it sent a five-man delegation to compete in track and field, powerlifting and table tennis. The country has competed in every subsequent edition of the Summer Paralympics, with small delegations. It has never taken part in the Winter Paralympics.

Moldova's two Paralympic medals so far were both won in 1996. Nikolai Tchoumak won bronze in the men's 10,000m race in the T12 category (severe visual impairment), while Vladimir Polkanov won bronze in the men's singles in table tennis, category 8.

== Medallists ==
| Medal | Name | Games | Sport | Event | Result |
|---|---|---|---|---|---|
| Bronze | Nikolai Tchoumak | 1996 Atlanta | Athletics | Men's 10,000m T12 | 34:36.85 |
| Bronze | Vladimir Polkanov | 1996 Atlanta | Table tennis | Men's Singles 8 | Pool stage: 1st of 4 (pool C) quarter-final: def Nico Vergeylen (BEL) 2:0 semi-final: def by Magnus Andree (SWE) 0:2 |

== See also ==
- Moldova at the Olympics
