= Swimming at the 2016 Summer Paralympics – Men's 50 metre freestyle S11 =

Paralympic event

Men's 50 metre freestyle S11 at the XV Paralympic Games
- Venue: Olympic Aquatics Stadium
- Dates: 12 September 2016
- Competitors: 16 from 13 nations

Medalists
1st place, gold medalist(s)		Bradley Snyder	United States
2nd place, silver medalist(s)		Keiichi Kimura	Japan
3rd place, bronze medalist(s)		Bozun Yang	China

The Men's 50 metre freestyle S11 event at the 2016 Paralympic Games took place on 12 September 2016, at the Olympic Aquatics Stadium. Two heats were held. The swimmers with the eight fastest times advanced to the final.

== Heats ==
=== Heat 1 ===
10:25 12 September 2016:

Rank	Lane	Name	Nationality	Time	Notes
1	4	Bozun Yang	China	26.36	Q
2	5	Hendri Herbst	South Africa	26.95	Q
3	6	Oleksandr Mashchenko	Ukraine	27.28	Q
4	7	Miroslav Smrcka	Czech Republic	27.48	Q
5	3	Matheus Souza	Brazil	27.74	
6	2	Wojciech Makowski	Poland	27.93	
7	1	Jeremy McClure	Australia	29.61	
8	8	Alexandr Covaliov	Moldova	33.30	

=== Heat 2 ===
10:29 12 September 2016:

Rank	Lane	Name	Nationality	Time	Notes
1	4	Bradley Snyder	United States	26.06	Q
2	5	Keiichi Kimura	Japan	26.99	Q
3	6	Hryhory Zudzilau	Belarus	27.11	Q
4	2	Viktor Smyrnov	Ukraine	27.62	Q
5	3	Chenquan Lou	China	27.63	
6	7	Edgaras Matakas	Lithuania	27.86	
7	1	Brayan Urbano Herrera	Colombia	29.28	
8	8	Leider Lemus Rojas	Colombia	30.82	

== Final ==
18:08 12 September 2016:

Rank	Lane	Name	Nationality	Time	Notes
1st place, gold medalist(s)	4	Bradley Snyder	United States	25.57	
2nd place, silver medalist(s)	6	Keiichi Kimura	Japan	26.52	
3rd place, bronze medalist(s)	5	Bozun Yang	China	26.72	
4	7	Oleksandr Mashchenko	Ukraine	26.97	
5	2	Hryhory Zudzilau	Belarus	27.02	
6	3	Hendri Herbst	South Africa	27.11	
7	1	Miroslav Smrcka	Czech Republic	28.08	
	8	Viktor Smyrnov	Ukraine		DSQ
