= Swimming at the 2016 Summer Paralympics – Men's 100 metre freestyle S11 =

Men's 100 metre freestyle S11 at the XV Paralympic Games
- Venue: Olympic Aquatics Stadium
- Dates: 15 September 2016
- Competitors: 13 from 12 nations

Medalists
1st place, gold medalist(s)		Bradley Snyder	United States
2nd place, silver medalist(s)		Bozun Yang	China
3rd place, bronze medalist(s)		Keiichi Kimura	Japan

The Men's 100 metre freestyle S11 event at the 2016 Paralympic Games took place on 15 September 2016, at the Olympic Aquatics Stadium. Two heats were held. The swimmers with the eight fastest times advanced to the final.

== Heats ==
=== Heat 1 ===
10:47 15 September 2016:

Rank	Lane	Name	Nationality	Time	Notes
1	4	Matheus Souza	Brazil	1:00.17	Q
2	3	Hryhory Zudzilau	Belarus	1:00.27	Q
3	6	Wojciech Makowski	Poland	1:01.53	Q
4	5	Keiichi Kimura	Japan	1:02.85	Q
5	2	Tharon Drake	United States	1:03.39	
6	7	Jeremy McClure	Australia	1:06.72	

=== Heat 2 ===
10:52 15 September 2016:

Rank	Lane	Name	Nationality	Time	Notes
1	4	Bradley Snyder	United States	57.16	PR Q
2	5	Bozun Yang	China	59.74	Q
3	3	Hendri Herbst	South Africa	1:00.59	Q
4	6	Miroslav Smrcka	Czech Republic	1:03.20	Q
5	7	Edgaras Matakas	Lithuania	1:06.09	
6	2	Brayan Urbano Herrera	Colombia	1:06.27	
7	1	Alexandr Covaliov	Moldova	1:18.06	

== Final ==
19:06 15 September 2016:

Rank	Lane	Name	Nationality	Time	Notes
1st place, gold medalist(s)	4	Bradley Snyder	United States	56.15	WR
2nd place, silver medalist(s)	5	Bozun Yang	China	59.51	
3rd place, bronze medalist(s)	1	Keiichi Kimura	Japan	59.63	
4	2	Hendri Herbst	South Africa	59.71	
5	3	Matheus Souza	Brazil	59.80	
6	6	Hryhory Zudzilau	Belarus	1:00.21	
7	7	Wojciech Makowski	Poland	1:01.74	
8	8	Miroslav Smrcka	Czech Republic	1:02.95	
