= Powerlifting at the 2016 Summer Paralympics – Women's 73 kg =

Women's 73 kg powerlifting event at the 2016 Summer Paralympics

Powerlifting – Women's 73 kg at the XV Paralympic Games
- Venue: Riocentro Pavilion 2
- Date: 12 September 2012
- Competitors: 7 from 7 nations
- Winning lift: 140.0 kg WR

Medalists
1st place, gold medalist(s)		Ndidi Nwosu	Nigeria
2nd place, silver medalist(s)		Souhad Ghazouani	France
3rd place, bronze medalist(s)		Amany Ali	Egypt

The women's 73 kg powerlifting event at the 2016 Summer Paralympics was contested on 12 September at Riocentro Pavilion 2. The best outcome out of three attempts counted as the final results. The athlete who placed first in each event was allowed a fourth attempt to break the Paralympic or world record.

== Records ==
There are twenty powerlifting events, corresponding to ten weight classes each for men and women. The weight categories were significantly adjusted after the 2012 Games so most of the weights are new for 2016. As a result, no Paralympic record was available for this weight class prior to the competition. The existing world records were as follows.

Record Type	Weight	Country	Venue	Date
World record	150.0 kg	Souhad Ghazouani (FRA)	Alexin	25 May 2013
Paralympic record	–	–	–	–

== Results ==
Rank	Name	Body weight (kg)	Attempts (kg)				Result (kg)
Rank	Name	Body weight (kg)	1	2	3	4	Result (kg)
1st place, gold medalist(s)	Ndidi Nwosu (NGR)	71.10	123.0	125.0	140.0		140.0
2nd place, silver medalist(s)	Souhad Ghazouani (FRA)	71.91	135.0	140.0; PR	~~145.0~~	–	140.0
3rd place, bronze medalist(s)	Amany Ali (EGY)	72.87	110.0	115.0	127.0	–	127.0
4	Arawan Bootpo (THA)	71.28	105.0	~~110.0~~	~~115.0~~	–	105.0
5	Mayagozel Ekeyeva (TKM)	71.85	100.0	105.0	~~110.0~~	–	105.0
6	Alina Kumeyko (UKR)	71.75	90.0	95.0	~~99.0~~	–	95.0
7	Larisa Marinenkova (MDA)	70.83	~~80.0~~	80.0	90.0	–	90.0
