= Judo at the 2008 Summer Paralympics – Men's 90 kg =

Judo competition

Judo - Men's 90 kg at the XIII Paralympic Games
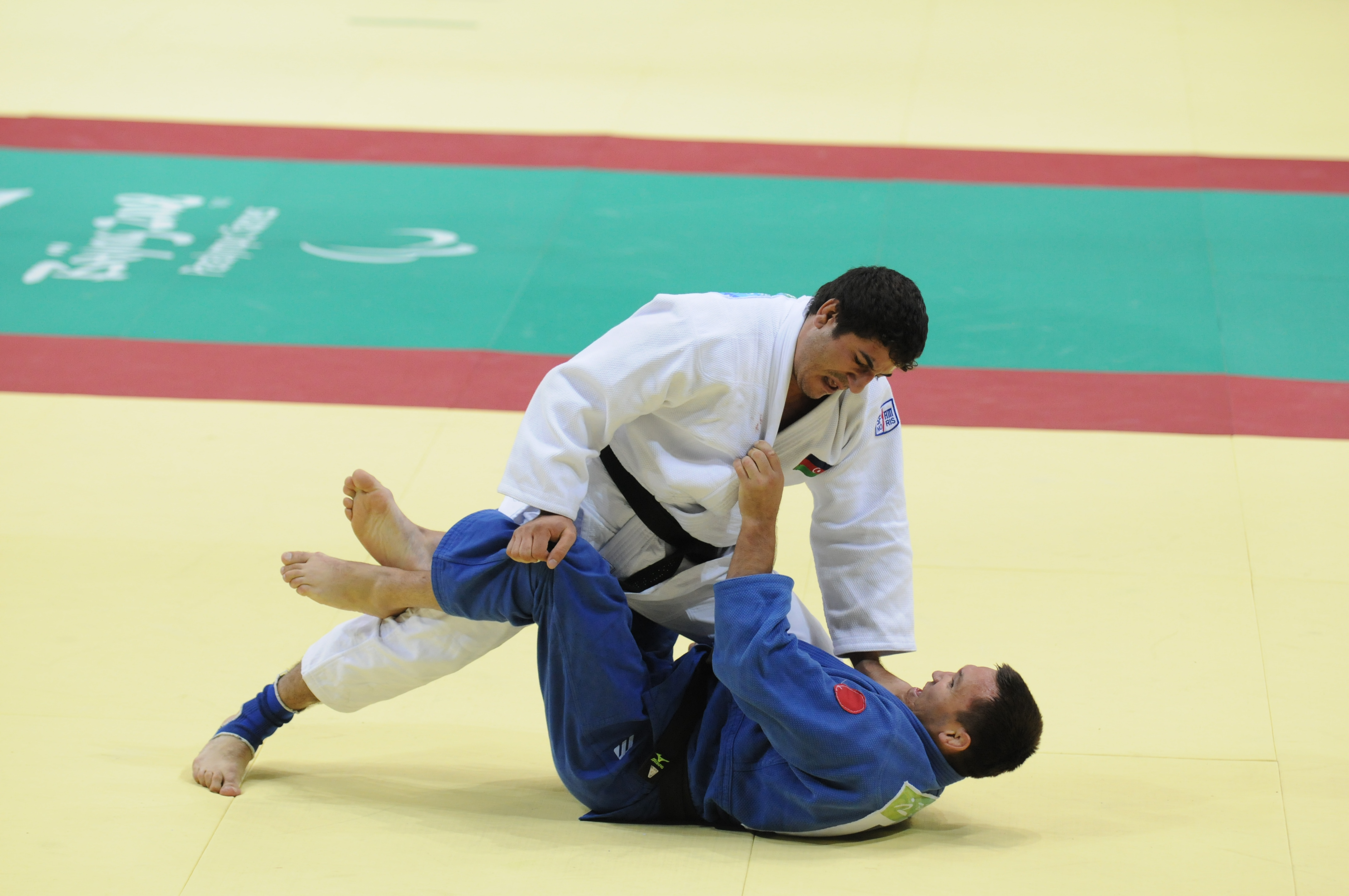
- Tofig Mammadov (AZE) competing
- Venue: Beijing Workers' Gymnasium
- Date: 9 September 2008
- Competitors: 12 from 12 nations

Medalists
1st place, gold medalist(s)		Oleg Kretsul	Russia
2nd place, silver medalist(s)		Tofig Mammadov	Azerbaijan
3rd place, bronze medalist(s)		Olivier Cugnon de Sévricourt	France
3rd place, bronze medalist(s)		Samuel Ingram	Great Britain

The men's 90 kg judo competition at the 2008 Summer Paralympics was held on 9 September at the Beijing Workers' Gymnasium.

This event was the third-heaviest of the men's judo weight classes, limiting competitors to a maximum of 90 kilograms of body mass. Like all other judo events, bouts lasted five minutes. If the bout was still tied at the end, it was extended for another five-minute, sudden-death period; if neither judoka scored during that period, the match is decided by the judges. The tournament bracket consisted of a single-elimination contest culminating in a gold medal match. There was also a repechage to determine the winners of the two bronze medals. Each judoka who had lost to a semifinalist competed in the repechage. The two judokas who lost in the semifinals faced the winner of the opposite half of the bracket's repechage in bronze medal bouts.

== Final ranking ==
Rank	Name
Gold medal	Oleg Kretsul (RUS)
Silver medal	Tofig Mammadov (AZE)
Bronze medal	Olivier Cugnon de Sévricourt (FRA)
Bronze medal	Samuel Ingram (GBR)
5	Anatoliy Shevchenko (RUS)
5	Messaoud Nine (ALG)
7	Abel Vazquez (ESP)
7	Sebastian Junk (GER)

== Tournament results ==
First Round
Oleg Kretsul (RUS)	1100
Abel Vazquez (ESP)	0000
Anatoliy Shevchenko (RUS)	0001
Messaoud Nine (ALG)	0010^{1}
Samuel Ingram (GBR)	0011^{1}
Olivier Cugnon de Sévricourt (FRA)	0021^{1}
Tofig Mammadov (AZE)	0211
Jonas Stoškus (LTU)	0000^{1}

Quarterfinals
Oleg Kretsul (RUS)	1000
Anthony Clarke (AUS)	0000
Andre Watson (USA)	0000^{1}
Messaoud Nine (ALG)	0001
Olivier Cugnon de Sévricourt (FRA)	0010^{1}
Yusuke Hatsuse (JPN)	0001^{2}
Tofig Mammadov (AZE)	0003^{1}
Sebastian Junk (GER)	0001^{1}

Semifinals
Oleg Kretsul (RUS)	1000
Messaoud Nine (ALG)	0000
Olivier Cugnon de Sévricourt (FRA)	0001
Tofig Mammadov (AZE)	1100^{1}

Final
Oleg Kretsul (RUS)	0100^{2}
Tofig Mammadov (AZE)	0010^{3}

=== Repechage ===
First round
Abel Vazquez (ESP)	0121
Anthony Clarke (AUS)	0000^{1}
Anatoliy Shevchenko (RUS)	1000
Andre Watson (USA)	0000
Samuel Ingram (GBR)	1000
Yusuke Hatsuse (JPN)	0000
Jonas Stoškus (LTU)	0000
Sebastian Junk (GER)	1102

Second round
Abel Vazquez (ESP)	0000^{1}
Anatoliy Shevchenko (RUS)	0001
Samuel Ingram (GBR)	0110
Sebastian Junk (GER)	0010

Bronze medal finals
Anatoliy Shevchenko (RUS)	0001^{1}
Olivier Cugnon de Sévricourt (FRA)	0002^{1}
Samuel Ingram (GBR)
Messaoud Nine (ALG)	Fusen-Gachi (forfeit)
