= Moldova at the 2000 Summer Paralympics =

- IPC code: MDA
- NPC: Paralympic Committee of Moldova

in Sydney
- Competitors: 6
- Medals Ranked 69th: Gold 0 Silver 0 Bronze 0 Total 0

Summer Paralympics appearances (overview)
- 1996; 2000; 2004; 2008; 2012; 2016; 2020; 2024

Other related appearances
- Soviet Union (1988); Unified Team (1992)

Moldova competed at the 2000 Summer Paralympics in Sydney, Australia. 6 competitors from Moldova won no medals to finish joint 69th in the medal table along with all other countries who failed to win medals.

== See also ==
- Moldova at the Paralympics
- Moldova at the 2000 Summer Olympics
