= UNICEF Kid Power =

UNICEF Kid Power is a philanthropic initiative that was launched in 2015 as a division of the US Fund for UNICEF. It marks UNICEF's first foray into the hardware space. UNICEF Kid Power, with the help of California-based technology firm Calorie Cloud and design studio Ammunition, developed a "Wearable for Good" activity tracker called Kid Power Bands.

The bands act as a kids’ fitness tracker bracelet that connects to a smartphone app. The app lets users complete missions, which counts total steps and awards points. The points unlock funding from partners, which is used by UNICEF to deliver packets of therapeutic food to severely malnourished children around the world.

== History ==
Rajesh Anandan, SVP of Strategic Partnerships and UNICEF Ventures, stated that UNICEF Kid Power and its Kid Power Band product can be seen as a digital extension of UNICEF's Trick-or-Treat program, which had been running since 1950.

== Partnerships ==
UNICEF Kid Power has previously participated in a number of partnerships and collaborations. In May 2016, UNICEF Kid Power partnered with The Walt Disney Company to create an exclusive Star Wars-themed Kid Power Band.

The National Basketball Association has also collaborated with UNICEF Kid Power via the Sacramento Kings. The City of Sacramento ‘Kid Power’ Pilot Program involved the usage of technology to educate about and highlight student fitness in the wider Sacramento area.

UNICEF Kid Power has previously collaborated with TEACH UNICEF and Scholastic in classrooms.

UNICEF Kid Power has also worked with a number of athletes working in gymnastics, soccer, basketball, baseball, and other sports, as Kid Power Champions. Those athletes include:

- Alex Morgan
- Tyson Chandler
- Bethany Mota
- Aly Raisman
- Laurent Duvillier
- Dartanyon Crockett
- Meryl Davis
- David Ortiz
- Maya Moore
- Cara Yar Khan
- Ashley Eckstein

Grammy award-winning musical artist Pink has previously acted as a UNICEF ambassador and Kid Power National Spokeswoman.
