= Anthony Clarke (judoka) =

Australian Olympic judoka

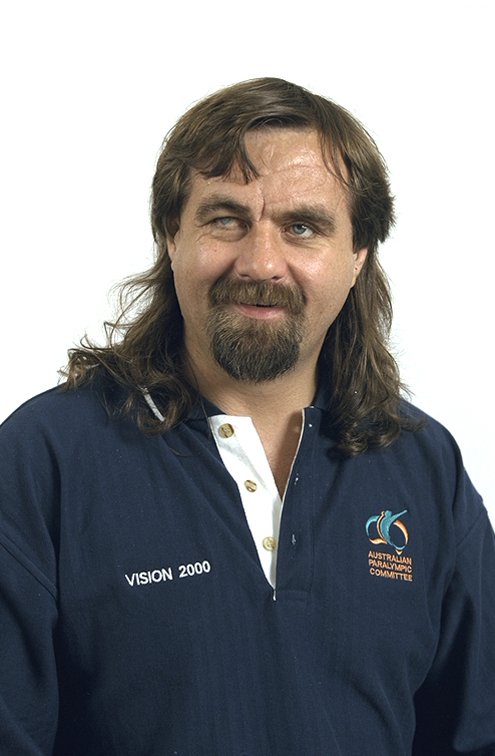
- Clarke photographed by the Australian Paralympic Committee in preparation for the 2000 Summer Paralympic Games in Sydney

Personal information
- Full name: Anthony Laurence Clarke
- Nickname: Tony
- National team: Australia
- Born: 19 June 1961 (age 65) Adelaide, South Australia
- Occupations: Judoka; Motivational speaker; Author
- Agent: Onya Soapbox, Ballarat, Victoria
- Other interests: Music
- Website: www.anthonyclarke.net.au

Sport
- Sport: Para judo
- Disability: Visual impairment
- Disability class: B1

Achievements and titles
- Highest world ranking: 1
Medal record
Men's para judo
Paralympic Games
Gold medal – first place	1996 Atlanta	-95 kg
International Blind Sports Association World Games
Bronze medal – third place	2002	-90 kg
Far East and South Pacific Games for the Disabled
Bronze medal – third place	2006 Kuala Lumpur	-90 kg
Australian National Championships
Bronze medal – third place	1993 Tasmania	-95 kg

Profile at external databases
- JudoInside.com: 33856

Anthony "Tony" Laurence Clarke, OAM (born 19 June 1961), is the only Australian Paralympic judoka gold medallist. He represented Australia at five Summer Paralympic Games and medalled at the 1993 Australian National Judo Championships competing against sighted opponents.

== Personal life ==
Clarke was born in Adelaide, South Australia on 19 June 1961 and was raised in Kilburn, Adelaide. He began drinking at age 14 and moved out of home the following year to work as a "sanitation engineer". His judo coach and mentor Michael Headland perceived "a life which was not going to amount to anything".

In 1978 Clarke lost control of the wheel of his car and drove it into a Stobie pole. He later recalled watching his hands fill with blood until he passed out. When he regained consciousness he was blind and his mother, Marjorie, had permitted the surgical removal of his left eye. In 2004 she recounted to ABC Television presenter George Negus, "the doctor said, 'you'd be a good advertisement for don't drink and drive'".

Clarke learned braille and computer skills using screen-reading technology, and spent two and a half years hitch-hiking across Australia and New Zealand, ensuring "the dog is well visible to get a sympathy lift."

Clarke is also a musician and has performed with a banjo and a mouth organ on James Place near Rundle Mall, Adelaide, every day for 15 years. In April 2016 Clarke reported to the police he had been repeatedly targeted by a thief later identified as Anastasia Dokas, 64. He explained that she gained his trust by giving him food, and that as he placed it down, she would take the money from his banjo case. Dokas denies the allegations, however her counsel recommends her case be referred to a mental health court diversion program.

== Career ==
In 1993 Clarke achieved his first career win against a sighted opponent at the Australian National Judo Championships. He secured a place in the Under 95 kg semi-final, a first for blind judo competitors, and was awarded a bronze medal.

This has surprised a few of those knockers, I'll tell you. I've won gold and silver in the South Australian championships, against sighted people before, but I'm messing with the big boys now, and I'm thrilled to bits.

— Anthony Clarke, on receiving a bronze medal at the 1993 Australian National Judo Championships, The Age

Four years after judo was introduced to the Summer Paralympic Games, Clarke represented Australia in the Men's Up To 78kg event at the 1992 Summer Paralympics in Barcelona. He was the first of two Australian judoka to compete at the Games (the other was Desiree Allan). He lost to Brett Lewis (USA), Joel Gichtenaere (FRA) and Javier Sainz (ESP) by ippon, waza-ari and koka in the Group A preliminaries.

Tony's Barcelona Olympic was bitterly disappointing for him. He was really upset with the way that he fought and he was going to spend the next four years making sure that that didn't happen again. When he got to Atlanta, it didn't happen again. He fought fiercely like a tiger and actually won that event. So he got the gold medal.

— Michael Headland (coach), George Negus Tonight

At the 1996 Summer Paralympics in Atlanta, Clarke received a gold medal in the Men's Up To 95kg event, becoming the first Australian Paralympic competitor to medal in judo. He defeated Arlindo Tinoco (BRA) by ippon in the quarter-final, Fermin Campos Ariza (ESP) by yuko in the semi-final, and Run Ming Men (CHN) by ippon in the final.

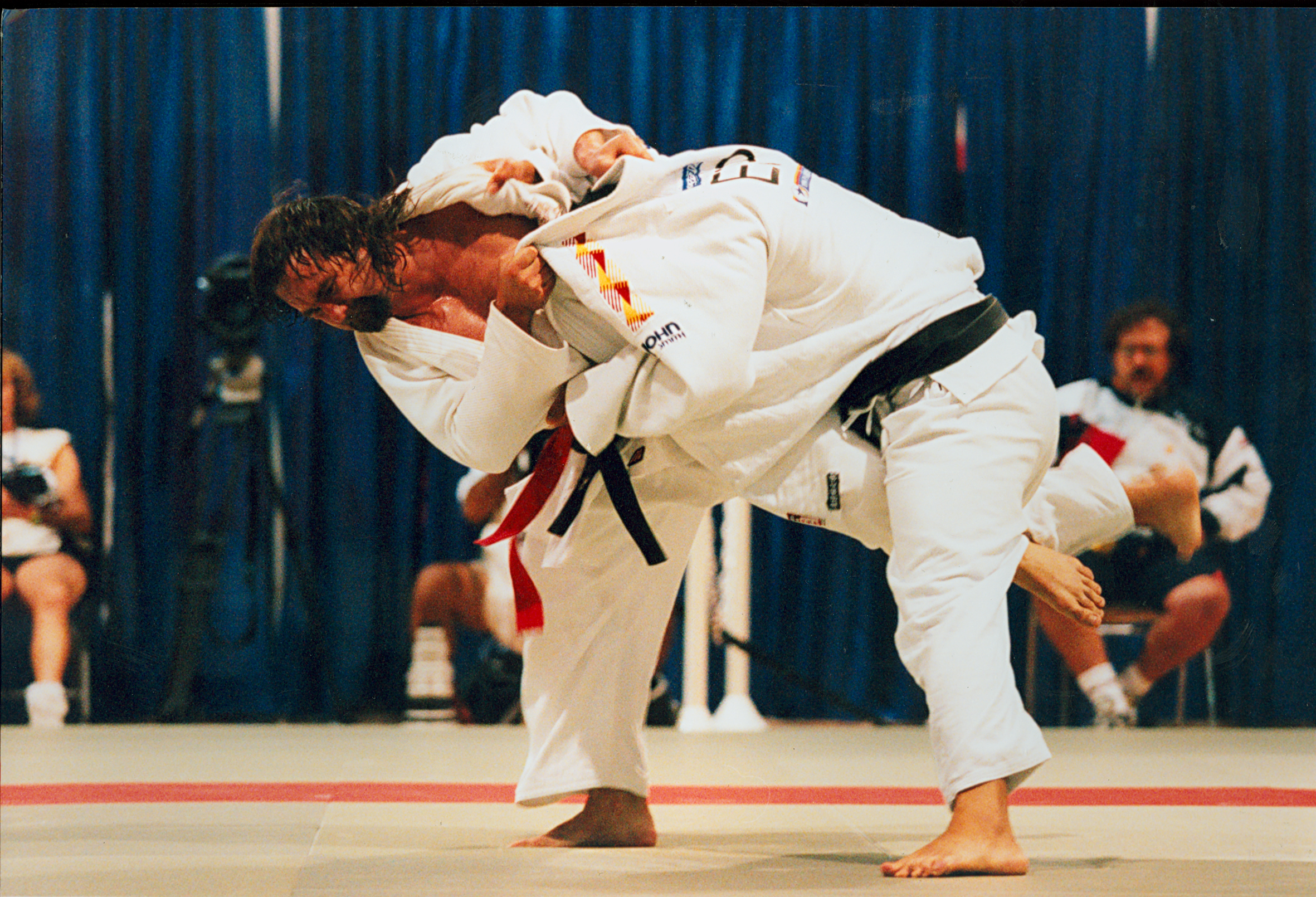
Anthony Clarke and Fermin Campos Ariza competing in the Men's Up To 95kg semi-final at the 1996 Summer Paralympic Games in Atlanta.

Between 1996 and 2000, Clarke held a scholarship with the Australian Institute of Sport. He was an official torch bearer at the Opening Ceremony of the Paralympic Games in Sydney in 2000 and competed in the Men's Up To 90kg event. He was defeated by ippon in the 1/8 final by Ian Rose (GBR).

At the 2004 Summer Paralympics in Athens, Clarke competed in the Men's Up To 90kg event, but was defeated by Oleg Kretsul (RUS) by ippon in the quarter-final.

In December 2006 Clarke accused the Oceania Judo Union of violating the Disability Discrimination Act (1975) by excluding him from its 2005 World Tournament and effectively costing him his place in the 2008 Australian Olympic team. He sought from the Federal Magistrates Court $31,440 (AUD) in compensation. The application was discontinued following mediation and a confidential settlement.

At the 2008 Summer Paralympic Games in Beijing, Oleg Kretsul (RUS) again defeated Clarke by ippon in the quarter-final of the Men's Up To 90kg event.

He retired in 2008.
