= Moldova at the 1996 Summer Paralympics =

- IPC code: MDA
- NPC: Paralympic Committee of Moldova

in Atlanta
- Competitors: 5
- Medals Ranked 57th: Gold 0 Silver 0 Bronze 2 Total 2

Summer Paralympics appearances (overview)
- 1996; 2000; 2004; 2008; 2012; 2016; 2020; 2024

Other related appearances
- Soviet Union (1988); Unified Team (1992)

Five male athletes from Moldova competed at the 1996 Summer Paralympics in Atlanta, United States. Nikolai Tchoumak earned a bronze medal in the men's 10,000m T12 and Vladimir Polkanov won a bronze medal in the men's singles 8 in table tennis.

== Medalist table ==
Medal	Name	Sport	Event
Bronze	Nikolai Tchoumak	Athletics	10,000m T12
Bronze	Vladimir Polkanov	Table tennis	Men's singles 8

== See also ==
- Moldova at the Paralympics
- Moldova at the 1996 Summer Olympics
