= Moldova at the 2012 Summer Paralympics =

- IPC code: MDA
- NPC: Paralympic Committee of Moldova

in London
- Competitors: 2 in 1 sport
- Medals: Gold 0 Silver 0 Bronze 0 Total 0

Summer Paralympics appearances (overview)
- 1996; 2000; 2004; 2008; 2012; 2016; 2020; 2024

Other related appearances
- Soviet Union (1988); Unified Team (1992)

Moldova competed at the 2012 Summer Paralympics in London, United Kingdom from August 29 to September 9, 2012.

== Powerlifting ==
Men

Athlete	Event	Result	Rank
Stefan Rosca	-75kg	167.0	9

Women

Athlete	Event	Result	Rank
Larisa Marinenkova	-67.5kg	NMR	

== See also ==
- Moldova at the 2012 Summer Olympics
