= Hélios Latchoumanaya =

French Paralympic judoka

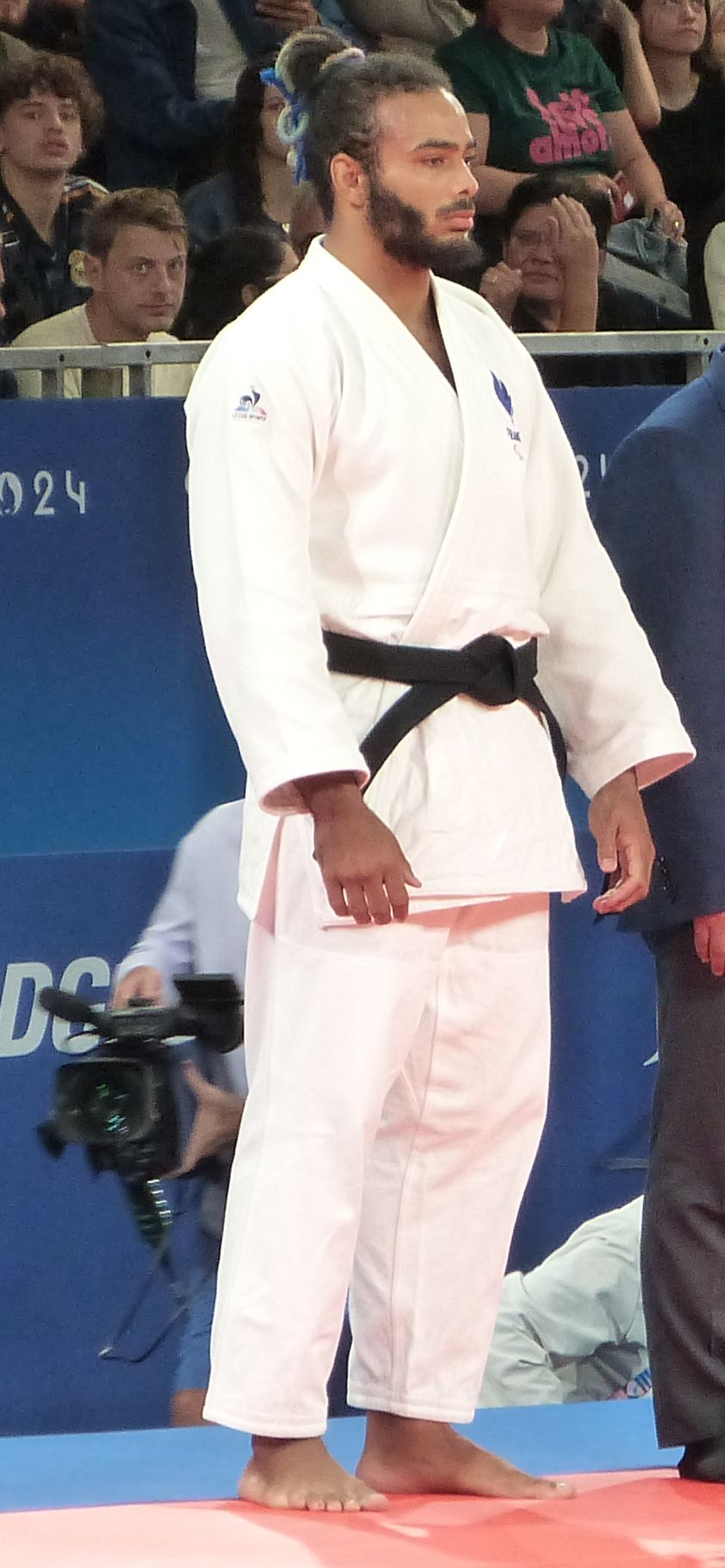
- Latchoumanaya in 2024

Personal information
- Born: 4 June 2000 (age 26) Tarbes, France
- Occupation: Judoka

Sport
- Country: France
- Sport: Para judo
- Weight class: -90kg
Medal record
Para judo
Representing France
Paralympic Games
Silver medal – second place	2024 Paris	-90 kg
Bronze medal – third place	2020 Tokyo	-90kg
European Championships
Silver medal – second place	2017 Walsall	-90kg
Silver medal – second place	2019 Genoa	-90kg
European Para Championships
Gold medal – first place	2023 Rotterdam	-90kg

Profile at external databases
- IJF: 69315
- JudoInside.com: 100036

Hélios Latchoumanaya (born 4 June 2000) is a French para judoka of Guadelopean descent. At the 2020 Summer Paralympics, he won a bronze medal in the men's 90 kg event. He has also won two European silver medals in the same weight category.
