= Judo at the 2024 Summer Paralympics – Men's 90 kg J1 =

Paralympical event

Judo – Men's 90 kg J1 at the XVII Paralympic Games
- Venue: Champ-de-Mars
- Date: September 2024
- Competitors: 11 from 11 nations

Medalists
1st place, gold medalist(s)		Arthur Cavalcante da Silva	Brazil
2nd place, silver medalist(s)		Daniel Powell	Great Britain
3rd place, bronze medalist(s)		Cyril Jonard	France
3rd place, bronze medalist(s)		Oleg Crețul	Moldova

The Men's 90 kg J1 judo competition at the 2024 Summer Paralympics was held in September 2024 at the Champ-de-Mars Arena, Paris.

== Classification ==
For the first time, Paralympic judo was divided into two classifications:

- J1 – An athlete's vision impairment must result in a visual acuity of less than or equal to LogMAR 2.6 in binocular vision.
- J2 – The athlete's visual acuity must be within a range between LogMAR 1.3 and 2.5 with binocular vision, or with a binocular visual field of 60 degrees or less in diameter.

This event was in the J1 classification.

== Results ==
=== Bracket ===
Round of 16
Valerio Teodori (ITA)	10
Battugs Batkhuyag (MGL)	0(DNS)
Taha Al-Gburi (IRQ)	0
Cyril Jonard (FRA)	10
Bauyrzhan Arstanbekov (KAZ)	0
Mousa Gholamishafia (IRI)	10

Quarterfinals
Arthur Cavalcante da Silva (BRA)	10
Turgun Abdiev (UZB)	0
Yasin Cimciler (TUR)	10
Valerio Teodori (ITA)	0
Oleg Creţul (MDA)	0
Cyril Jonard (FRA)	1
Daniel Powell (GBR)	10
Mousa Gholamishafia (IRI)	0

Semifinals
Arthur Cavalcante da Silva (BRA)	11
Yasin Cimciler (TUR)	0
Cyril Jonard (FRA)	0
Daniel Powell (GBR)	1

Final
Arthur Cavalcante da Silva (BRA)	10
Daniel Powell (GBR)	0

=== Repechage ===
Repechage 2
Turgun Abdiev (UZB)	10
Valerio Teodori (ITA)	0

Bronze medal
Turgun Abdiev (UZB)	0
Cyril Jonard (FRA)	10

Repechage 1
Oleg Crețul (MDA)	10
Taha Al-Gburi (IRQ)	0

Repechage 2
Oleg Crețul (MDA)	10
Mousa Gholamishafia (IRI)	0

Bronze medal
Oleg Crețul (MDA)	10
Yasin Cimciler (TUR)	1
