= Moldova at the 2004 Summer Paralympics =

- IPC code: MDA
- NPC: Paralympic Committee of Moldova

in Athens
- Competitors: 3 in 2 sports
- Flag bearer: Iurii Marinenkov
- Medals: Gold 0 Silver 0 Bronze 0 Total 0

Summer Paralympics appearances (overview)
- 1996; 2000; 2004; 2008; 2012; 2016; 2020; 2024

Other related appearances
- Soviet Union (1988); Unified Team (1992)

Moldova competed at the 2004 Summer Paralympics in Athens, Greece. The team included 3 athletes, all males but won no medals.

== Sports ==
=== Athletics ===
==== Men's track ====
Athlete	Class	Event	Heats		Semifinal		Final	
Athlete	Class	Event	Result	Rank	Result	Rank	Result	Rank
Nicolai Ciumac	T13	5000m	—				DNF	
Nicolai Ciumac	T13	10000m	—				34:20.88	11
Nicolai Ciumac	T13	Marathon	—				3:09:03	13
Igor Lisnic	T13	5000m	—				DNS	
Igor Lisnic	T13	10000m	—				34:41.58	13
Igor Lisnic	T13	Marathon	—				DNF	

=== Powerlifting ===
Athlete	Event	Result	Rank
Iurii Marinenkov	67.5kg	127.5	12

== See also ==
- Moldova at the Paralympics
- Moldova at the 2004 Summer Olympics
