= Elliot Stewart =

British Paralympic judoka

Elliot Stewart (born 22 February 1988) is a British Paralympic judoka. At the 2020 Summer Paralympics, he won a silver medal in the men's 90 kg event.

Stewart is the son of fellow judoka Dennis Stewart, who won a bronze medal in judo at the 1988 Olympics. His brother Max is also a judoka who has represented Great Britain and Jamaica internationally. Elliot took up the sport during his childhood and competed for Team GB at the 2004 European Cadet Judo Championships in Rotterdam as an able-bodied athlete. After suffering rapid deterioration in his eyesight, he was diagnosed with keratoconus: he underwent emergency surgery in 2017 which prevented a complete loss of sight but his vision had declined to the point where he was unable to compete as an able-bodied judoka and had to give up his job teaching judo in schools. However he subsequently underwent testing to find out whether he could compete as a visually impaired competitor, and received a B3 classification, enabling him to continue full-time training at the GB Judo Centre of Excellence with his father as his coach.

He made his debut in para judo at the 2017 IBSA European Judo Championships in Walsall. Stewart took bronze medals at the 2018 IBSA World Judo Championships, the 2019 IBSA World Games and the 2019 European Championships.
