= Zviad Gogotchuri =

Georgian judoka (born 1986)

Personal information
- Native name: ზვიად გოგოჭური
- Born: 30 October 1986 (age 39)
- Occupation: Judoka

Sport
- Country: Georgia
- Sport: Judo
- Weight class: ‍–‍90 kg, ‍–‍100 kg

Achievements and titles
- Paralympic Games: (gold) (2016)
- World Champ.: R32 (2011)
- European Champ.: 7th (2014)
Medal record
Representing Georgia
Men's Paralympic judo
Paralympic Games
Gold medal – first place	2016 Rio de Janeiro	‍–‍90 kg
IBSA European Championships
Gold medal – first place	2015 Odivelas	‍–‍90 kg
Men's judo
IJF Grand Slam
Bronze medal – third place	2013 Baku	‍–‍90 kg
IJF Grand Prix
Gold medal – first place	2014 Tbilisi	‍–‍90 kg
Bronze medal – third place	2012 Baku	‍–‍90 kg
Bronze medal – third place	2012 Abu Dhabi	‍–‍90 kg
Bronze medal – third place	2013 Düsseldorf	‍–‍90 kg
Bronze medal – third place	2014 Düsseldorf	‍–‍90 kg

Profile at external databases
- IJF: 3500
- JudoInside.com: 53477
- Updated on 27 November 2022

Zviad Gogotchuri (Georgian: ზვიად გოგოჭური, born 30 October 1986) is a visually impaired Georgian Paralympic judoka. He won a gold medal at the 2016 Summer Paralympics in the 90 kg category. This marked his and Georgia's inaugural Paralympic medal.

After arriving to Japan for the 2021 Summer Paralympics, he was arrested for assaulting a security guard at a Tokyo hotel on 16 August 2021.
