= Oleksandr Nazarenko (judoka) =

Ukrainian Paralympic judoka

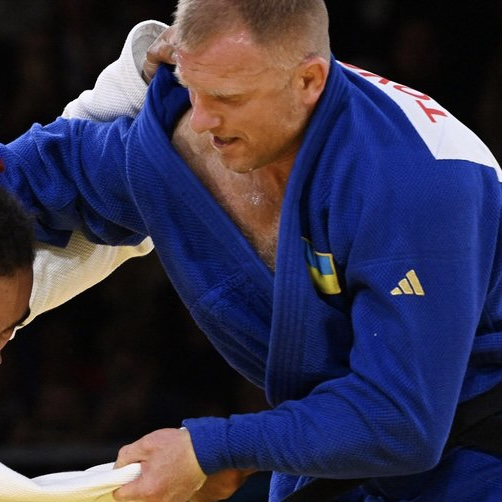
- Nazarenko at the 2024 Summer Paralympics

Medal record

Men's para judo

Representing Ukraine
Gold medal – first place	2024 Paris	90 kg
Bronze medal – third place	2020 Tokyo	90 kg

Oleksandr Nazarenko (born 24 June 1986) is a Ukrainian Paralympic judoka. At the 2020 Summer Paralympics, he won a bronze medal in the men's 90 kg event. At the 2024 Summer Paralympics, he won a gold medal in the men's 90 kg event.
