= Sam Ingram =

Paralympic martial artist

Personal information
- Nationality: British
- Born: 21 August 1985 (age 40) Coventry, West Midlands, England
- Occupation: Judoka

Sport
- Country: Great Britain
- Sport: Judo
- Event: –90 kg
Medal record
Representing Great Britain
Paralympic Games
Silver medal – second place	2012 London	-90 kg
Bronze medal – third place	2008 Beijing	-90 kg
World Championships
Silver medal – second place	2010 Antalya	+90 kg
European Championships
Bronze medal – third place	2007 Debrecen	-90 kg
Bronze medal – third place	2015 Portugal	-90 kg

Profile at external databases
- JudoInside.com: 68555

Sam Ingram (born 21 August 1985) is a British Paralympic Judo competitor who represented the United Kingdom at the 2008 Summer Paralympics in Beijing and at the 2012 Summer Paralympics in London.

== Personal history ==
Ingram was born in 1985. Originally from Coventry, Ingram and his brother, Joe, were both born with the genetic eye condition corneal dystrophy, meaning they cannot see in colour and have no central vision. He attended the Alderman Callow school in Coventry before moving to Exhall Grange, a specialist school for visually impaired students. Ingram; the purple house at the school is named after him. After leaving the school he attended University College Falmouth to study broadcasting.

== Judo career ==
Ingram was inspired to take up judo by his brother, who competed in the martial art at university. He represented Great Britain at the 2008 Paralympics in Beijing, where he won a bronze medal. He also competed at the 2007 IBSA World Championships in Brazil, where he picked up a silver. He won a silver again in 2010, and competed in the European Championships in 2011, winning a gold on that occasion. He won a silver at the 2012 Summer Paralympics.

In the run up to the 2016 Summer Paralympics in Rio, Ingram competed in the 2015 IBSA European Judo Championships in Portugal. There he secured a bronze medal in his -90 kg with a win against Russia's Vladimir Fedin in the third spot decider.
