= Olivier Cugnon de Sévricourt =

French Paralympic judoka

Olivier Cugnon
Personal information
- Full name: Olivier Cugnon de Sévricourt
- Born: 12 June 1973 (age 53) Bourg-la-Reine, France

Sport
- Country: France
- Sport: Paralympic judo
Medal record
Paralympic judo
Representing France
Paralympic Games
Bronze medal – third place	2008 Beijing	Men's -90kg
World Championships
Silver medal – second place	2006 Brommat	Men's -90kg
European Championships
Silver medal – second place	2011 Crawley	Men's -90kg
Bronze medal – third place	2005 Vlaardingen	Men's -90kg
Bronze medal – third place	2009 Debrecen	Men's -90kg

Olivier Cugnon de Sévricourt (born 12 June 1973) is a French former Paralympic judoka who competed at international judo competitions. He competed at three Paralympic Games and won a bronze medal at the 2008 Summer Paralympics, he is also a World silver medalist and a European silver medalist.

Cugnon de Sévricourt was an able bodied judoka who trained with Laurent Crost, Crost went on to compete at the 1996 Olympic Games. Olivier lost his eyesight in both eyes after he was involved in a road accident when he was aged twenty years old. He took a four-year break after the accident then returned to judo in 2001 while studying physiotherapy.
