= Tofig Mammadov =

Azerbaijani Paralympic judoka

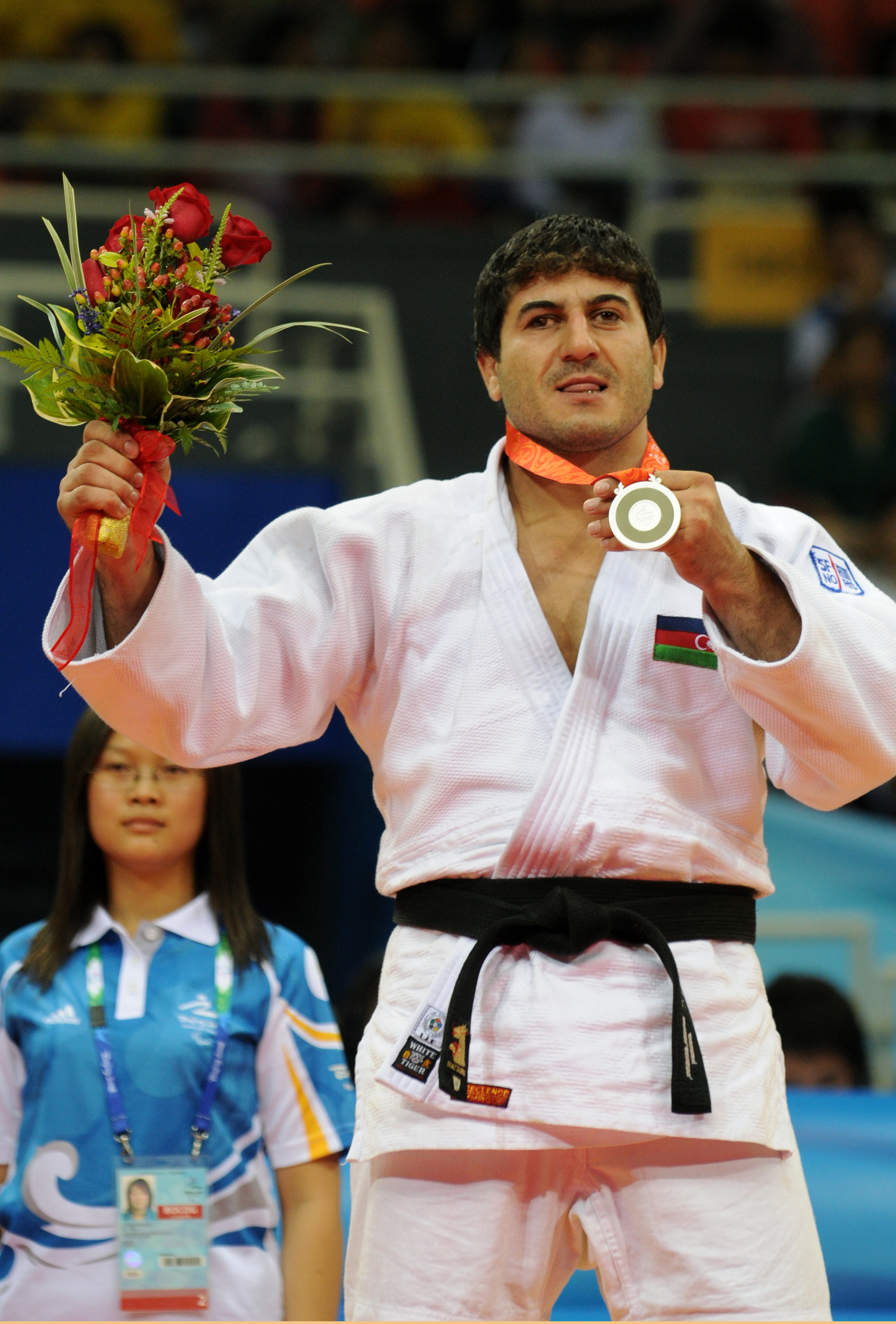
- Mammadov at the 2008 Beijing Paralympics

Personal information
- Native name: Məmmədov Tofiq Faiq oğlu
- Full name: Tofiq Faiq oglu Mammadov
- Nationality: Azerbaijani
- Citizenship: Azerbaijan
- Born: 10 March 1980 (age 46) Sumgayit
- Height: 175 cm (5 ft 9 in)
- Weight: 90 kg (198 lb)

Sport
- Country: Azerbaijan
- Sport: Paralympic judo
- Position: Judo
- Disability: Blind
- Disability class: B1
- Coached by: Ahmaddin Rajabli
Medal record
Men's Judo
Representing Azerbaijan
Paralympic Games
Bronze medal – third place	2008 Beijing	90 kg
World Championships
Gold medal – first place	2006 Brommat	90 kg
Bronze medal – third place	2007 São Paulo	90 kg
Gold medal – first place	2011 Antalya	90 kg
European Championships
Gold medal – first place	2007 Baku	90 kg
Silver medal – second place	2009 Debrecen	90 kg
- Updated on 20 May 2020

Tofig Mammadov (Azerbaijani: Məmmədov Tofiq Faiq oğlu, born 10 March 1980, Sumgayit) is an Azerbaijani athlete who competes in the under 90 kg category; he was a silver medalist in the 2008 Summer Paralympics. He competed in the 2012 Summer Paralympics and was the World and European champion in 2011.

== Life ==
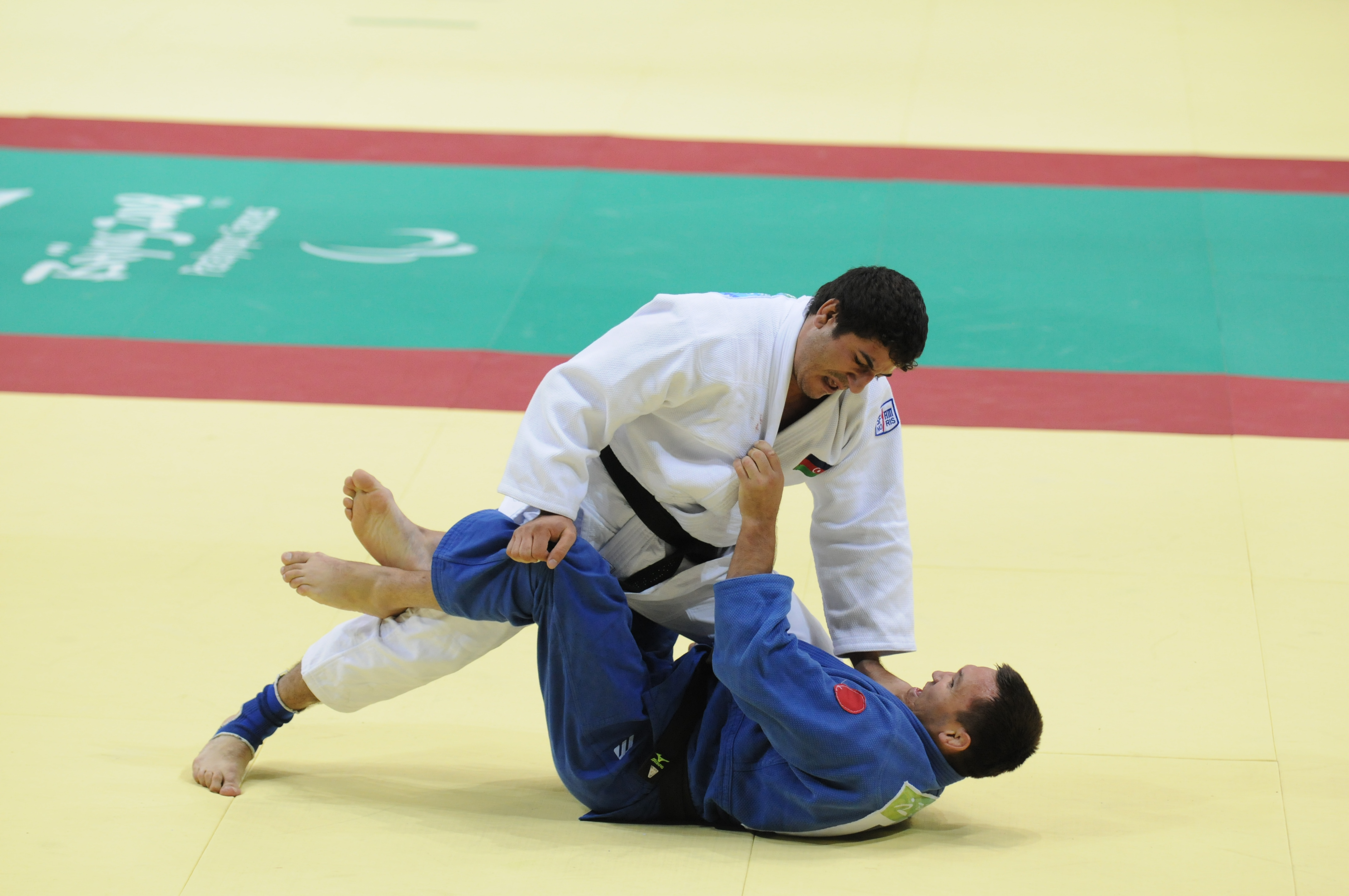
Tofig Mammadov during the final match of the 2008 Summer Paralympic Games. (Beijing, 2008)

Tofig Mammadov was born on 10 March 1980] in Sumgayit, Azerbaijan SSR. He began training at a local judo school in Sumgayit at an early age. He won the gold medal at World Championships held in Brommat, France in 2006.

Mammadov was a gold medalist at the European championship held in Baku in 2007. He came in third and won the bronze medal at the São Paulo World Championships held in Brazil in 2007.

He won a silver medal at the Summer Paralympics held in Beijing, China in 2008.

In 2009, he competed at the European championship held in Debrecen, Hungary and was a silver medalist. He won a gold medal at the World Championships held in Antalya, Turkey in 2011. He also participated in the Summer Paralympics held in London in 2012.

Mammadov was awarded the Taraggi (Progress) medal by the President of Azerbaijan in 2011 for his contribution to the Paralympic Movement in Azerbaijan.

He was granted the Honorary diploma of the President award in 2016 for his service in developing the Paralympic Movement in Azerbaijan. His personal trainer was Ibrahim Ibrahimov.

== Awards ==
Row	Year	Competition	Place	Result
1	2008	2008 Summer Paralympics	China, Beijing	Silver medal
2	2011	World Championships	Turkey, Antalya	Gold medal
3	2007	European championship	Azerbaijan, Baku	Gold medal
4	2009	European championship	Hungary, Debrecen	Silver medal
