= Arthur Cavalcante da Silva =

Brazilian paralympic judoka

Arthur Cavalcante
Personal information
- Full name: Arthur Cavalcante da Silva
- Born: 11 March 1992 (age 34) Natal, Rio Grande do Norte, Brazil
- Occupation: Judoka

Sport
- Country: Brazil
- Sport: Para judo
- Disability class: J1
Medal record
Para judo
Representing Brazil
Paralympic Games
| Gold medal – first place | 2024 Paris | 90 kg J1 |
Parapan American Games
| Silver medal – second place | 2023 Santiago | 90 kg |
| Silver medal – second place | 2019 Lima | 90 kg |
| Bronze medal – third place | 2015 Toronto | 100 kg |

Profile at external databases
- IJF: 64948
- JudoInside.com: 99683

Arthur Cavalcante da Silva (born 11 March 1992), also known as Arthur Cavalcante or Arthur Silva, is a Brazilian paralympic judoka. He competed at the 2024 Summer Paralympics, winning the gold medal in the men's 90 kg J1 event.
