= Shukhrat Boboev =

Uzbekistani Paralympic judoka (born 1985)

Personal information
- Born: 3 December 1985 (age 40)

Sport
- Country: Uzbekistan
- Sport: Paralympic judo
Medal record
Paralympic Games
Bronze medal – third place	2016 Rio de Janeiro	90 kg
Asian Para Games
Gold medal – first place	2014 Incheon	90 kg
Silver medal – second place	2018 Jakarta	90 kg
Bronze medal – third place	2018 Jakarta	Team

Shukhrat Boboev (born 3 December 1985) is an Uzbekistani Paralympic judoka. He represented Uzbekistan at the 2016 Summer Paralympics in Rio de Janeiro, Brazil and won the bronze medal in the men's 90 kg event.

At the 2017 Islamic Solidarity Games held in Baku, Azerbaijan, he won the gold medal in the same weight category.
