= Vladimir Polkanov =

Moldovan para table tennis player

Sport
- Country: Moldova
- Sport: Para table tennis
- Disability class: C8
Medal record
Men's para table tennis
Representing Moldova
Summer Paralympic Games
Bronze medal – third place	1996 Atlanta	Singles 8

Vladimir Polkanov is a Moldovan para table tennis player. He represented Moldova at the 1996 Summer Paralympics in Atlanta, United States and he won a bronze medal in the men's singles 8 event.

He also competed at the 1992 Summer Paralympics in Barcelona, Spain as part of the Unified Team.
