= Matheus Souza =

Brazilian footballer (born 1995)

Personal information
- Full name: Matheus Souza e Silva
- Date of birth: 2 August 1995 (age 31)
- Place of birth: Duque de Caxias, Brazil
- Height: 1.78 m (5 ft 10 in)
- Position: Winger

Team information
- Current team: Shan United
- Number: 33

Senior career*
Years	Team	Apps	(Gls)
2017	Artsul	10	(1)
2018	Olancho	0	(0)
2019	Las Delicias	13	(9)
2019	National Police Commissary	13	(12)
2020	Soltilo Angkor	16	(13)
2021	Phnom Penh Crown	14	(9)
2022	Muang Loei United	4	(2)
2022–2023	Suphanburi	30	(6)
2023	PSMS Medan	6	(2)
2023–2024	Persekat Tegal	8	(1)
2024–2025	Phrae United	34	(12)
2025–	Shan United	5	(1)
- * Club domestic league appearances and goals as of 18 October 2025

Matheus Souza e Silva (born 2 August 1995) is a Brazilian professional footballer who plays as a winger for Myanmar National League club Shan United.

Matheus has played his trade in Southeast Asia mostly in Cambodia, Thailand, Indonesia and Myanmar.

== Club career ==
Born in Duque de Caxias, Matheus began his professional football career starting from joining Artsul, who played in the third caste. He then moved to Honduras and joined Olancho in the 2017–2018 season, and joined Las Delicias in the 2018–19 season, Matheus then decided to pursue a career in Southeast Asia and joined Cambodian Premier League club National Police Commissary during the middle of the 2019 season, then in the 2020 season, he joined Soltilo Angkor.

=== Phnom Penh Crown ===
On 25 November 2020, Matheus signed a contract with Phnom Penh Crown. He had a good season in this season with 14 appearances and 9 goals, while helping Phnom Penh Crown win the championship Cambodian Premier League this season. Phnom Penh Crown won the championship for the sixth time in their history.

=== Muang Loei United ===
Ahead of the 2021–22 Thai League 3 National Championship, he decided to Thailand and was signed by Muang Loei United. He made his club debut on 12 March 2022, coming on as a starter in a 0–1 home lose against Phitsanulok. Eight days later, Matheus scored his first league goal for Muang Loei United in a 2–0 home win against Sisaket.

=== Suphanburi ===
In July 2022, it was announced that Matheus signs with Suphanburi. On 14 August 2022, he made his Thai League 2 debut by starting against Customs Ladkrabang United, also scored his first league goal in a 2–0 home win. Matheus scored his second league goal for the club in a 0–2 away win over Samut Prakan City on 28 August 2022.

== Honours ==
=== Club ===
Phnom Penh Crown

- Cambodian Premier League: 2021

Muang Loei United

- Thai League 3 North Eastern Region: 2021–22
