= Dartanyon Crockett =

American judoka (born 1991)

Personal information
- Full name: Dartanyon Davon Crockett
- Born: May 21, 1991 (age 35) Cleveland, Ohio, U.S.
- Occupation: Judoka
- Height: 5 ft 7 in (170 cm)
- Weight: 198 lb (90 kg)

Sport
- Sport: Para judo
Medal record
Men's judo
Representing United States
Paralympic Games
Bronze medal – third place	2012 London	90 kg
Bronze medal – third place	2016 Rio de Janeiro	90 kg
Parapan American Games
Bronze medal – third place	2015 Toronto	90kg

Profile at external databases
- IJF: 16601
- JudoInside.com: 89740

Dartanyon Davon Crockett (born May 22, 1991) is a competitive Judo athlete for the United States. Crockett is legally blind. He won the bronze medal in the men's 90 kg division at both the 2012 Summer Paralympics in London in London and the 2016 Summer Paralympics in Rio. He attends Pikes Peak Community College, where he is majoring in Social Work. He is a former wrestler as well as a member of Team USA. Additionally, Crockett recently joined UNICEF Kid Power as a brand ambassador Kid Power Champion.
