= Oleg Crețul =

Moldovan judoka

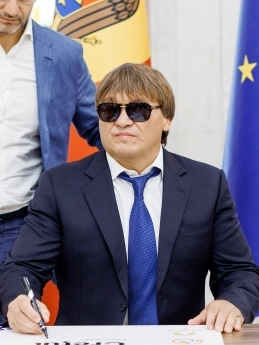
- Crețul in 2024

Personal information
- Born: 21 February 1975 (age 51) Chișinău, Moldavian SSR, Soviet Union
- Occupation: Judoka

Sport
- Sport: Judo
- Disability: Blindness
- Disability class: J1
Medal record
Representing Moldova
Men's para judo
Paralympic Games
Bronze medal – third place	2024 Paris	90 kg J1
European Para Championships
Gold medal – first place	2023 Rotterdam	90 kg J1
Men's judo
European Championships
Silver medal – second place	1996 The Hague	78 kg
Representing Russia
Men's para judo
Paralympic Games
Gold medal – first place	2008 Beijing	90 kg
Silver medal – second place	2004 Athens	90 kg

Profile at external databases
- IJF: 64954, 53376
- JudoInside.com: 7075, 158915

Oleg Crețul (Олег Крецул, also spelled Kretsul, born 21 February 1975) is a Moldovan judoka. He competed in the men's half-middleweight event at the 1996 Summer Olympics.

In 1997, Crețul became blind as a result of a car accident. He later competed in para judo at the 2004, 2008, 2012, 2020 and 2024 Summer Paralympics.

== Achievements ==
Year	Tournament	Place	Weight class
1996	European Judo Championships	2nd	78 kg
2004	Paralympic Games	2nd	90 kg
2008	Paralympic Games	1st	90 kg
2023	European Para Championships	1st	90 kg J1
2024	Paralympic Games	3rd	90 kg J1
