= Larisa Marinenkova =

Moldovan Paralympic powerlifter

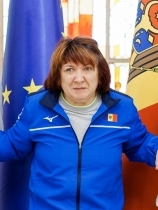
- Marinenkova in 2024

Personal information
- National team: Moldova

Sport
- Country: Moldova
- Sport: Powerlifting
- Weight class: 73 kg
Medal record
Women's powerlifting
Representing Moldova
IPC Powerlifting Open European Championships
Bronze medal – third place	2013 Aleksin	73 kg
World Para Paralifting World Cup
Silver medal – second place	2017 Eger	73 kg
- Updated on 14 November 2017

Larisa Marinenkova (born 7 March 1969) is a Moldovan powerlifter who has competed at three Summer Paralympics for her country, and won medals in the IPC Powerlifting Open European Championships and 2017 World Para Paralifting World Cup.

== Career ==
As a child, Larisa Marinenkova contracted polio, resulting in permanent muscle weakness. She eventually moved to sports, despite the lack of adapted facilities in Moldova. In 2008, she finished eight in her weight class at the 2008 Summer Paralympics in Beijing, China. Marinenkova won the bronze medal in her weight class at the International Paralympic Committee Powerlifting Open European Championships in 2013 at Aleksin, Russia.

She was selected as one of two members of the Moldovan team for the 2012 Summer Paralympics in London, England. However, she was unable to lift the standard weight set, something that she was severely disappointed about and drove her to compete at the following Games.

She finished seventh in her event at the 2016 Summer Paralympics in Rio de Janeiro, Brazil. The Government of Moldova gave her an additional 300,000 Moldovan leu because of her success at the Games. This was awarded some six months after it was initially announced.

At the 2017 World Para Paralifting World Cup in Eger, Hungary, Marinenkova finished in second place behind Egypt's Rehab Abougharbya. Marinenkova's largest lift was 88 kilograms (194 lb), while Abourgharbya's was 115 kilograms (254 lb).
