= Judo at the 2015 European Games – Women's blind 57 kg =

Women's blind 57 kg at the 2015 European Games
- Venue: Heydar Aliyev Arena
- Date: 26 June
- Competitors: 8 from 6 nations

Medalists
gold medal	Inna Cherniak	Ukraine
silver medal	Sabina Abdullayeva	Azerbaijan
bronze medal	Nataliya Nikolaychyk	Ukraine
bronze medal	Ramona Brussig	Germany

The women's 57 kg blind judo event at the 2015 European Games in Baku was held on 26 June at the Heydar Aliyev Arena.

== Results ==
Quarterfinals
Inna Cherniak (UKR)	100
Natalia Ovchinnikova (RUS)	000
Ramona Brussig (GER)	001
Gülhan Kılıç (TUR)	000
Sabina Abdullayeva (AZE)	100
María Monica Merenciano (ESP)	000
Nataliya Nikolaychyk (UKR)	101
Şerife Köseoğlu (TUR)	000

Semifinals
Inna Cherniak (UKR)	101
Ramona Brussig (GER)	000
Sabina Abdullayeva (AZE)	011
Nataliya Nikolaychyk (UKR)	000

Final
Inna Cherniak (UKR)	100
Sabina Abdullayeva (AZE)	001

Repechage

Repechage
Natalia Ovchinnikova (RUS)	000
Gülhan Kılıç (TUR)	100

Third place
Gülhan Kılıç (TUR)	000
Nataliya Nikolaychyk (UKR)	100

Repechage
María Monica Merenciano (ESP)	001
Şerife Köseoğlu (TUR)	110

Third place
Şerife Köseoğlu (TUR)	000
Ramona Brussig (GER)	110
