= Judo at the 2012 Summer Paralympics – Women's 52 kg =

Judo – Women's 52 kg at the XIV Paralympic Games
- Venue: ExCeL London
- Date: 30 August 2012
- Competitors: 8 from 8 nations

Medalists
1st place, gold medalist(s)		Ramona Brussig	Germany
2nd place, silver medalist(s)		Lijing Wang	China
3rd place, bronze medalist(s)		Nataliya Nikolaychyk	Ukraine
3rd place, bronze medalist(s)		Michele Ferreira	Brazil

The women's 52 kg judo competition at the 2012 Summer Paralympics was held on 30 August at ExCeL London.

== Results ==
Quarterfinals
Nataliya Nikolaychyk (UKR)	000
Sandrine Martinet (FRA)	0011
Shizuka Hangai (JPN)	0001
Lijing Wang (CHN)	021
Ramona Brussig (GER)	1002
Gulhan Kilic (TUR)	0014
Alesia Stepaniuk (RUS)	0011
Michele Ferreira (BRA)	0001

Semifinals
Sandrine Martinet (FRA)	0011
Lijing Wang (CHN)	0102
Ramona Brussig (GER)	101
Alesia Stepaniuk (RUS)	000

Finals
Lijing Wang (CHN)	000
Ramona Brussig (GER)	100

=== Repechage ===
Repechage
N Nikolaychyk (UKR)	100
S Hangai (JPN)	000

Bronze medal finals
N Nikolaychyk (UKR)	101
A Stepaniuk (RUS)	000

Repechage
G Kilic (TUR)	0002
M Ferreira (BRA)	022

Bronze medal finals
M Ferreira (BRA)	100
S Martinet (FRA)	000

* France's Sandrine Martinet, having injured her ankle during her semi-final, did not take part in her bronze medal final, enabling Brazil's Michele Ferreira to win bronze in a walkover.
