= 2015 IBSA European Judo Championships =

Judo competition

2015 IBSA Judo European Championships
- Venue: Multiusos Sports Hall
- Location: Odivelas, Portugal
- Dates: 25–30 November 2015

The 2015 IBSA Judo European Championships were held in Odivelas, Portugal, from 25–30 November 2015. It was held at the Multiusos Sports Hall in the city. The championship was the 13th to be held and was the last event whereby European athletes could collect points for qualification to the 2016 Summer Paralympics in Rio. Each country could send a maximum of two competitors per eight division. The competition is open to all classification of visually impaired athlete (B1, B2 and B3), who compete against each other.

Russia finished on top of the Championship table by total number of medals won (17), and class of medals won.

== Men's events ==
Event	Gold	Silver	Bronze
Extra-lightweight (60 kg)	Vitalii Koriakin (B2); Russia	Ramin Ibrahimov (B2); Azerbaijan	Recep Ciftci (B2); Turkey
Extra-lightweight (60 kg)	Vitalii Koriakin (B2); Russia	Ramin Ibrahimov (B2); Azerbaijan	Zaur Dzhabrailov (B2); Russia
Half-lightweight (66 kg)	Bayram Mustafayev (B2); Azerbaijan	Davyd Khorava (B2); Ukraine	Luis Daniel Gavilan Lorenzo (B3); Spain
Half-lightweight (66 kg)	Bayram Mustafayev (B2); Azerbaijan	Davyd Khorava (B2); Ukraine	Viktor Rudenko (B1); Russia
Lightweight (73 kg)	Ramil Gasimov (B2); Azerbaijan	Dmytro Solovey (B2); Ukraine	Nikolai Kornhass (B2); Germany
Lightweight (73 kg)	Ramil Gasimov (B2); Azerbaijan	Dmytro Solovey (B2); Ukraine	Serhii Kotenko (B2); Ukraine
Half middleweight (81 kg)	Olexandr Kosinov (B2); Ukraine	Rovshan Safarov (B2); Azerbaijan	Cyril Jonard (B1); France
Half middleweight (81 kg)	Olexandr Kosinov (B2); Ukraine	Rovshan Safarov (B2); Azerbaijan	Anatolii Shenchenko (B1); Russia
Middleweight (90 kg)	Zviad Gogotchuri (B2); Georgia	Oleksandr Nazarenko (B3); Ukraine	Sam Ingram (B1); Great Britain
Middleweight (90 kg)	Zviad Gogotchuri (B2); Georgia	Oleksandr Nazarenko (B3); Ukraine	Oleg Kretsul (B3); Russia
Half heavyweight (100 kg)	Abdula Kuramagomedov (B2); Russia	Malik Kurbanov (B3); Russia	Kanan Abdullakhanli (B3); Azerbaijan
Half heavyweight (100 kg)	Abdula Kuramagomedov (B2); Russia	Malik Kurbanov (B3); Russia	Chris Skelley (B2); Great Britain
Heavyweight (+100 kg)	Ilham Zakiyev (B1); Azerbaijan	Gaidar Gaidarov (B2); Russia	Jack Hodgson (B2); Great Britain
Heavyweight (+100 kg)	Ilham Zakiyev (B1); Azerbaijan	Gaidar Gaidarov (B2); Russia	Aleksandr Parasiuk (B2); Russia

== Women's events ==
Event	Gold	Silver	Bronze
Extra-lightweight (48 kg)	Victoria Potapova (B1); Russia	Carmen Brussig (B2); Germany	Aygul Faizullina (B2); Russia
Extra-lightweight (48 kg)	Victoria Potapova (B1); Russia	Carmen Brussig (B2); Germany	Ecem Tasin (B2); Turkey
Half-lightweight (52 kg)	Nataliya Nikolaychyk (B2); Ukraine	Sandrine Martinet (B2); France	Zeynep Çelik (B2); Turkey
Half-lightweight (52 kg)	Nataliya Nikolaychyk (B2); Ukraine	Sandrine Martinet (B2); France	Alesia Stepaniuk (B2); Russia
Lightweight (57 kg)	Inna Cherniak (B2); Ukraine	Sabina Abdullayeva (B2); Azerbaijan	Elena Bogdanova (B2); Russia
Lightweight (57 kg)	Inna Cherniak (B2); Ukraine	Sabina Abdullayeva (B2); Azerbaijan	Gulhan Kilic (B2); Turkey
Half middleweight (63 kg)	Iryna Husieva (B2); Ukraine	Olga Pozdnysheva (B2); Russia	Afag Sultanova (B2); Azerbaijan
Middleweight (70 kg)	Tatiana Savostyanova (B2); Russia	Olga Zabrodskaia (B2); Russia	Lucija Brekovic (B3); Croatia
Heavyweight (+70 kg)	Mesme Tasbag (B3); Turkey	Arina Kachan (B3); Belarus	Irina Kalyanova (B3); Russia

== Medal summary ==
=== Medal table ===
* Host nation

Rank	Nation	Gold	Silver	Bronze	Total
1	Russia (RUS)	4	4	9	17
2	Ukraine (UKR)	4	3	1	8
3	Azerbaijan (AZE)	3	3	2	8
4	Turkey (TUR)	1	0	4	5
5	Georgia (GEO)	1	0	0	1
6	France (FRA)	0	1	1	2
6	Germany (GER)	0	1	1	2
8	Belgium (BEL)	0	1	0	1
9	Great Britain (GBR)	0	0	3	3
10	Croatia (CRO)	0	0	1	1
10	Spain (ESP)	0	0	1	1
Totals (11 entries)		13	13	23	49
