= Hilmi Esat Bayındırlı =

Turkish-American alpine skier

Personal information
- Nicknames: "Erik", "Ebay", "Shat", "Mc Gyver"
- Nationality: American, Turkish
- Born: 5 June 1962 (age 64)
- Home town: Park City, Utah, United States
- Height: 1.78 m (5 ft 10 in)
- Weight: 80 kg (180 lb)

Sport
- Sport: Para-alpine skiing
- Disability: Spinal cord injury
- Disability class: LW11
- Event(s): Men's giant slalom, sitting
- Coached by: BCF, Murat Tosun (Turkey national team)
Medal record
Men's Para-alpine skiing

Hilmi Esat Bayındırlı (born 5 June 1962), also known as Erik Bayindirli, is a Turkish-American Paralympic alpine skier, who competes in the LW11 disability class of mostly men's giant slalom, sitting event. He represented United States at the 2006 Winter Paralympics and Turkey at the 2014 Winter Paralympics. A trained jeweller, he was paralyzed below the chest following a car accident in his youth.

== Personal life ==
Hilmi Esat Bayındırlı was born to Turkish parents on 5 June 1962, and grew up in Verbier, Switzerland. At the age of 17, he moved to the United States. He attended La Jolla High School in California to take some classes voluntarily. After developing an interest in jewelry making, he went to Oregon to get trained at a school in diamond setting. In the next two years, he ran a jewelry business in San Diego, California. As a passionate skier, he realized that he had too little time for his sport hobby. Therefore, he gave up retailing jewelry and instead handcrafted rings and designed pendants in his home workshop for sale privately. Later, he moved to Utah.

His father was Hilmi Bayındırlı. He is also known as Erik Bayindirli, and nicknamed "Ebay".

== Road accident ==
In August 1981 at the age of 19, he was involved in a road accident, which was caused by a flat tire when driving at high speed and subsequently loss of control of the vehicle. His car tipped over onto its roof after rolling over several times. He was ejected and remained under the crashed car. He broke his back, and became paralyzed due to the spinal cord injury. While he has full function of his arms and fingers, he has only partial control of his body and no leg function. This leaves him unable to walk.

== Sports career ==
Inspired by his father, Bayındırlı began skiing together with his brother Jem (Jem Bayindirli) in Switzerland when he was three years old. He was always performing skiing before he was paralyzed. Around six months after his injury, he became aware of adaptive skiing, and upon his physician's advise, he continued in skiing as a disabled pursuing his passion. His disability pointed him towards competitive sport. He improved himself in the para-alpine skiing sport discipline, and began to develop the outrigger ski suitable for his needs. He is convinced that the right equipment is crucial in para-skiing. For his problem solving talent in handcrafting his skiing equipment, he is dubbed Mac Gyver, the title character of a TV series. The monoski, he built with an additional shock absorber for his legs, helped him to improve his racing performance in the Super-G discipline at World Cup.

He competes in the disability class of LW11, which is a sit skiing sport class for para-skiers with paralysis in the lower extremities. His first participation in a skiing competition was at Winter Park Resort, Colorado in 1981. In addition to Giant slalom, he competed in the sitting versions of some other disciplines, such as downhill, slalom, super-G, and super combined.

A graduate of Alpine skiing branch at the Rowmark Ski Academy in Salt Lake City, Utah, he is 1.78 m (5 ft 10 in) tall and weighs 80 kg (180 lb). The para-skier trains at the National Ability Center in Park City, He performs also water skiing, para-cycling with a handcycle and wheelchair tennis as hobby, which keep him in shape. He played at U.S. Wheelchair Tennis Open in San Diego.

=== United States ===
During a stay in Copper Mountain, Colorado, he decided to participate at the U.S. Disabled Alpine Championships. He won one gold and two silver medals in the competition. He internationally debuted at the Para Alpine Skiing World Cup held at Kimberley, British Columbia, Canada in 1989. In 2006, he was admitted to the U.S. Paralympics Alpine skiing Team, and debuted at the Winter Paralympics in 2006 in Turin, Italy, where he took place 33 in the Giant slalom, sitting event. In 2007, he placed third in the U.S. Nationals that earned him a spot in the 2008 U.S. team. At the 2008 Hartford U.S. Disabled Championships in Soldier Mountain Ski Are, Fairfield, Idaho, he won a third place in downhill, sitting event, a third place in NORAM sitting and another third place in the slalom, sitting, a fourth place in the giant slalom, sitting and a third place in the super-G, sitting event. The same year, he ranked sixth in the slalom event at "The Hartford Ski Spectacular" held in Breckenridge, Colorado. At the 2010 IPC Alpine Skiing NORAM Cup held in Park City, Utah, he captured the first place. He became runners-up at the same tournament in 2013. He placed sixth at the finals of 2013–14 FIS Alpine Ski World Cup.

=== Turkey ===
As he was not selected by the U.S. Paralympic Committee to race at the 2010 Winter Paralympics in Canada, he decided to join the Turkish team, which had not participated at the Winter Paralympic Games before. Turkey saw "his decision as a great honor". Bayındırlı was qualified to take part at the 2014 Winter Paralympics in Sochi, Russia, representing Turkey by gaining a direct quota. He was part of Turkey's first ever participation at the Winter Paralympics along with his teammate Mehmet Çekiç. He finished the giant slalom, sitting event at place 18.

He is coached by Murat Tosun in the Turkish national team since 2013.
