= Judo at the 2008 Summer Paralympics – Women's 57 kg =

The women's 57 kg judo competition at the 2008 Summer Paralympics was held on September 8 at the Beijing Workers' Gymnasium. Preliminary rounds started at 12:00 pm CST. Repechage finals, semifinals, bouts for bronze medals, and the final were held at 5:00 pm CST.

This event was the third-lightest of the women's judo weight classes, limiting competitors to a maximum of 57 kilograms of body mass. Like all other judo events, bouts lasted five minutes. If the bout was still tied at the end, it was extended for another five-minute, sudden-death period; if neither judoka scored during that period, the match is decided by the judges. The tournament bracket consisted of a single-elimination contest culminating in a gold medal match. There was also a repechage to determine the winners of the two bronze medals. Each judoka who had lost to a semifinalist competed in the repechage. The two judokas who lost in the semifinals faced the winner of the opposite half of the bracket's repechage in bronze medal bouts.

== Medalists ==
Gold	Wang Lijing; China
Silver	Ramona Brussig; Germany
Bronze	Daniele Silva; Brazil
Bronze	Maria Monica Merenciano; Spain

== Tournament results ==
First Round
Daniele Silva (BRA)	0042
Maria Monica Merenciano (ESP)	0101^{1}
Ekaterina Buzmakova (RUS)	0000
Wang Lijing (CHN)	1000
Duygu Cete (TUR)	0000
Ramona Brussig (GER)	0010
Mounia Karkar (ALG)	0010
Maria Keramida (GRE)	0000

Semifinals
Maria Monica Merenciano (ESP)	0000
Wang Lijing (CHN)	1000
Ramona Brussig (GER)	0011
Mounia Karkar (ALG)	0000^{1}

Final
Wang Lijing (CHN)	1014
Ramona Brussig (GER)	0000^{1}

=== Repechage ===
Semifinals
Daniele Silva (BRA)	1000
Ekaterina Buzmakova (RUS)	0000
Duygu Cete (TUR)	0010
Maria Keramida (GRE)	1000

Bronze medal finals
Daniele Silva (BRA)	0100
Mounia Karkar (ALG)	0000
Maria Keramida (GRE)	0002
Maria Monica Merenciano (ESP)	0010^{1}
