= List of flag bearers for Turkey at the Paralympics =

Turkey at the Paralympics
- IPC code: TUR
- NPC: Turkish Paralympic Committee
- Medals: Gold 6 Silver 6 Bronze 11 Total 23

Summer appearances
- 1992; 1996; 2000; 2004; 2008; 2012; 2016; 2020; 2024

Winter appearances
- 2014; 2018; 2022

This is a list of flag bearers who have represented Turkey at the Paralympics

#	Event year	Season	Flag bearer	Sex	Sport	Ref.
10	2024	Summer	Sevilay Öztürk	F	Swimming	
10	2024	Summer	Mahmut Bozteke	M	Taekwondo	
9	2020	Summer	Havva Elmalı	F	Athletics	
9	2020	Summer	Mucahit Günaydın	M	Wheelchair basketball	
8	2018	Winter	Mehmet Çekiç	M	Alpine skiing	
7	2016	Summer	Mesme Taşbağ	M	Judo	
6	2014	Winter	Mehmet Çekiç	M	Alpine skiing	
5	2012	Summer	Gizem Girişmen	F	Archery	
4	2008	Summer	Muharrem Korhan Yamaç	M	Shooting	
3	2004	Summer				
2	2000	Summer				
1	1992	Summer				
