= Judo at the 2008 Summer Paralympics – Women's 52 kg =

The women's 52 kg judo competition at the 2008 Summer Paralympics was held on September 7 at the Beijing Workers' Gymnasium. Preliminary rounds started at 12:00 pm CST. Repechage finals, semifinals, bouts for bronze medals, and the final were held at 5:00 pm CST.

This event was the second-lightest of the women's judo weight classes, limiting competitors to a maximum of 52 kilograms of body mass. Like all other judo events, bouts lasted five minutes. If the bout was still tied at the end, it was extended for another five-minute, sudden-death period; if neither judoka scored during that period, the match is decided by the judges. The tournament bracket consisted of a single-elimination contest culminating in a gold medal match. There was also a repechage to determine the winners of the two bronze medals. Each judoka who had lost to a semifinalist competed in the repechage. The two judokas who lost in the semifinals faced the winner of the opposite half of the bracket's repechage in bronze medal bouts.

== Medalists ==
Gold	Cui Na; China
Silver	Sandrine Aurieres-Martinet; France
Bronze	Alesya Stepanyuk; Russia
Bronze	Michele Ferreira; Brazil

== Tournament results ==
First Round
Michele Ferreira (BRA)	1010
Minako Tsuchiya (JPN)	0000
Cui Na (CHN)
Bye
Sandrine Aurieres-Martinet (FRA)	1000
Thi Nhoi Trieu (VIE)	0000
Sheila Hernández (ESP)	0000
Alesya Stepanyuk (RUS)	1000

Semifinals
Michele Ferreira (BRA)	0001
Cui Na (CHN)	0010
Sandrine Aurieres-Martinet (FRA)	1000
Alesya Stepanyuk (RUS)	0000

Final
Cui Na (CHN)	0103
Sandrine Aurieres-Martinet (FRA)	0011^{1}

=== Repechage ===
Semifinals
Minako Tsuchiya (JPN)
Bye
Thi Nhoi Trieu (VIE)	0000
Sheila Hernández (ESP)	0200

Bronze medal finals
Minako Tsuchiya (JPN)	0000
Alesya Stepanyuk (RUS)	0200
Sheila Hernández (ESP)	0000
Michele Ferreira (BRA)	1000
