= Inna Cherniak =

Ukrainian judoka (born 1988)

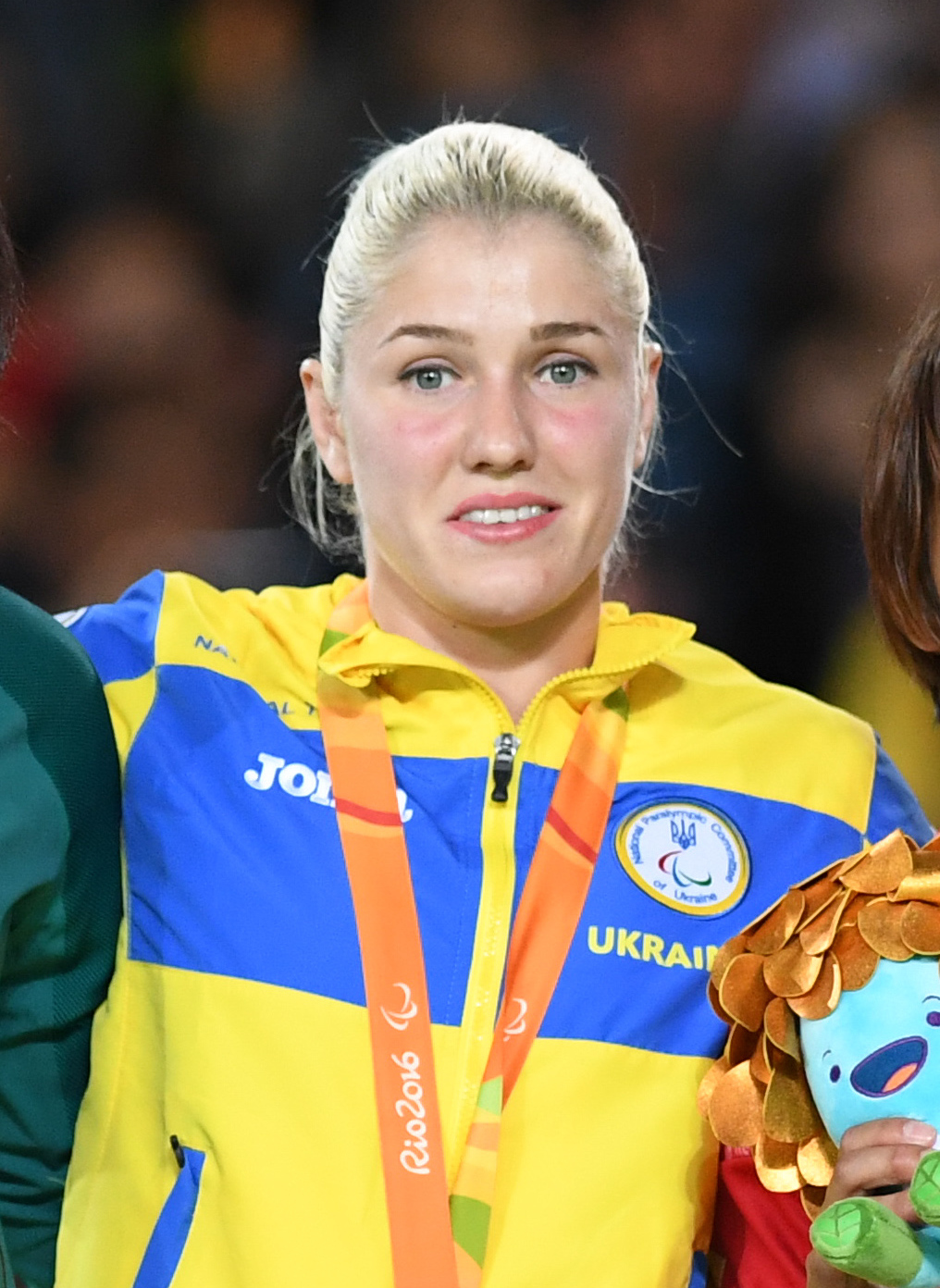
- Cherniak at the 2016 Paralympics

Personal information
- Born: 26 March 1988 (age 38) Zaporizhia, Ukraine
- Occupation: Judoka

Sport
- Country: Ukraine
- Sport: Judo, sambo
- Weight class: –52 kg, –57 kg

Achievements and titles
- Paralympic Games: (gold) (2016)
- World Champ.: (2014, 2018)
- European Champ.: (gold) (2013, 2015, 2015, 2019)
Medal record
Representing Ukraine
Women's Paralympic judo
Paralympic Games
Gold medal – first place	2016 Rio de Janeiro	–57 kg
IBSA World Championships and Games
Gold medal – first place	2014 Colorado	–57 kg
Gold medal – first place	2018 Lisbon	–52 kg
Silver medal – second place	2015 Seoul	–57 kg
European Games
Gold medal – first place	2015 Baku	–57 kg
IBSA European Judo Championships
Gold medal – first place	2013 Eger	–57 kg
Gold medal – first place	2015 Odivelas	–57 kg
Gold medal – first place	2019 Genoa	–52 kg
Women's judo
European Cadet Championships
Silver medal – second place	2004 Rotterdam	–40 kg
Women's sambo
Summer Universiade
Silver medal – second place	2013 Kazan	–52 kg

Profile at external databases
- IJF: 4432
- JudoInside.com: 33678

Inna Mikolaevna Cherniak (Ukrainian: Інна Миколаївна Черняк, born 26 March 1988) is a Ukrainian judo and sambo practitioner.

== Career ==
Despite being visually impaired from birth she competes both against sighted and visually impaired people. Her twin sister Maryna is not visually impaired and takes part in regular judo tournaments. To avoid competing against each other the sisters often split the events. For example, at the 2013 World Championships, Inna competed in the 52 kg and Maryna in the 48 kg division. At the 2013 Universiade, both sisters won medals in the 52 kg category, but Inna in sambo and Maryna in judo. In 2016, Inna won a gold medal in judo at the 2016 Summer Paralympics, while Maryna was eliminated in her second bout at the 2016 Summer Olympics.
