= Afag Sultanova =

Azerbaijani judoka

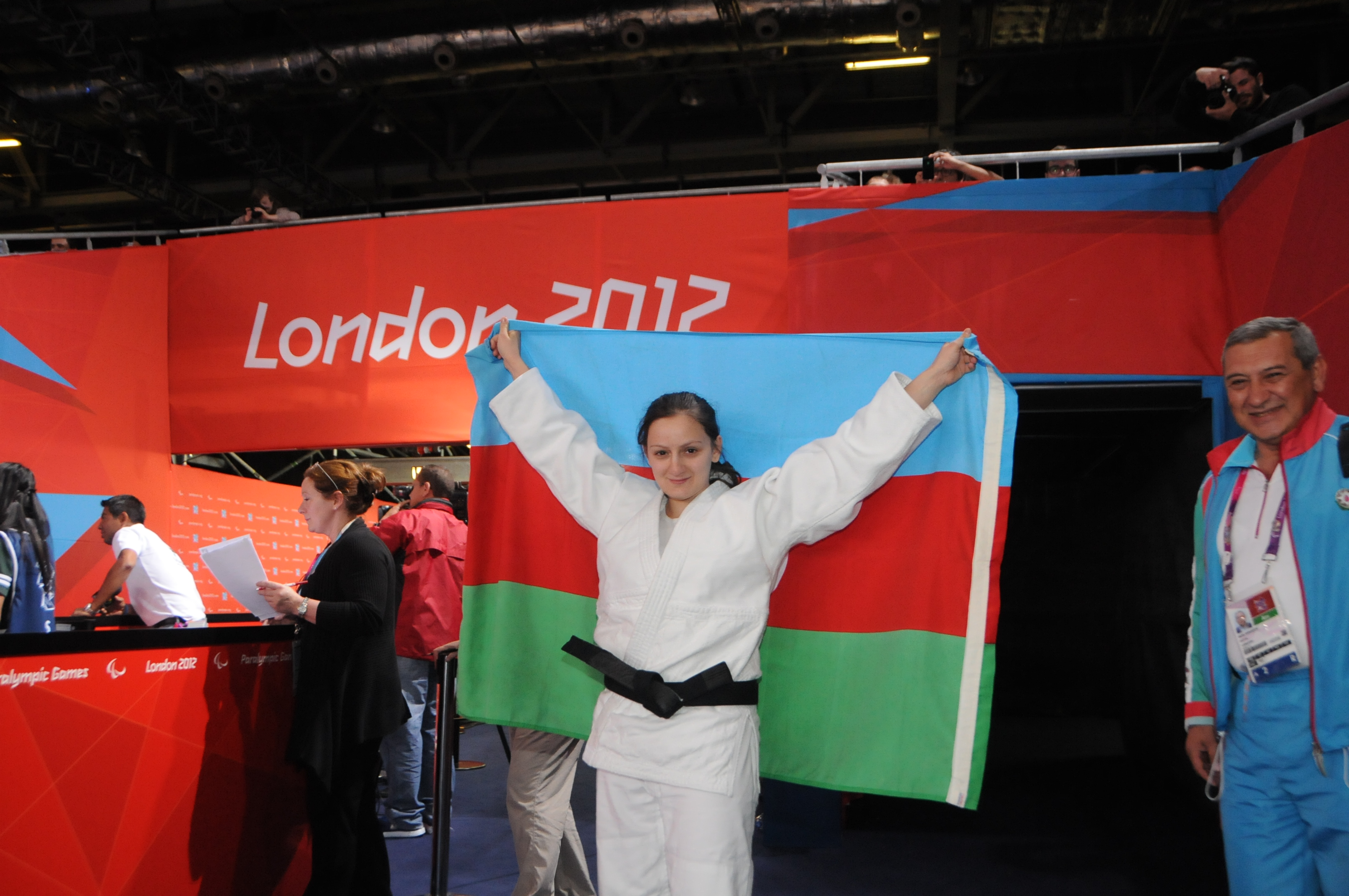

Medal record

Women's judo

Representing Azerbaijan

Paralympic Games
Gold medal – first place	2012 London	57 kg

World Championships
Gold medal – first place	2010 Antalya	57 kg

European Championships
Bronze medal – third place	2015 Odivelas	63 kg

Afag Sultanova (born 20 February 1987 in Baku) is a visually impaired Azerbaijani Paralympic judoka. She started in karate, but took up judo at thirteen. She originally competed as an able-bodied individual and had success in it. She was European Youth and World Champion in 2008. After an injury impaired her vision she considered giving up judo, but was later inspired by the story of fellow Azerbaijani judoka Ilham Zakiyev to return as a Paralympian. She went on to win a gold medal in Judo at the 2012 Summer Paralympics.
