= Nataliya Nikolaychyk =

Ukrainian Paralympic judoka (born 1986)

Personal information
- Born: 13 September 1986 (age 39) Rivne, Ukraine
- Occupation: Judoka

Sport
- Country: Ukraine
- Sport: Para judo
- Disability: Vision impairment
- Disability class: J1
- Weight class: −48 kg
Medal record
Women's para judo
Representing Ukraine
Paralympic Games
Gold medal – first place	2024 Paris	−48 kg J1
Bronze medal – third place	2012 London	−52 kg
Bronze medal – third place	2020 Tokyo	−52 kg
European Para Championships
Gold medal – first place	2023 Rotterdam	−48 kg J1
European Games
Bronze medal – third place	2015 Baku	−57 kg

Nataliya Nikolaychyk (born 13 September 1986 in Rivne) is a visually impaired Ukrainian Paralympic judoka. She represented Ukraine at the 2012 Summer Paralympics held in London, United Kingdom and she won one of the bronze medals in the women's 52 kg event.

== Career ==
At the 2015 IBSA European Judo Championships held in Odivelas, Portugal, she won the gold medal in the women's 52 kg event.

At the 2015 European Games held in Baku, Azerbaijan, she won one of the bronze medals in the women's blind 57 kg event.
