= Mesme Taşbağ =

Turkish judoka (born 1981)

Personal information
- Nationality: Turkish
- Born: 7 September 1981 (age 44) Iğdır, Turkey

Sport
- Country: Turkey
- Sport: Judo
- Event: +70 kg
Medal record
Representing Turkey
Women's Judo
Paralympics
Bronze medal – third place	2016 Rio de Janeiro	+70 kg
IBSA World Championships and Games
Bronze medal – third place	2015 Seoul	+70 kg
IBSA European Championships
Gold medal – first place	2015 Odivelas	+70 kg

Mesme Taşbağ (born 7 September 1981) is a Turkish visually impaired judoka (disability class B3) competing in the heavyweight (+70 kg) division. She is a physician by profession.

== Early life ==
Mesme Taşbağ was born in Iğdır, Turkey on 9 July 1981. She was educated in medicine at Ondokuz Mayıs University in Samsun graduating in 2008. She served five years long in her hometown in Iğdır. Currently, she works as a physician in the emergency service of the Yunus Emre Hospital in Eskişehir.

== Sporting career ==
Taşbağ began in Iğdır with performing judo as she wanted to stay in shape. During this time, she developed keratoconus, a degenerative disorder of the eye leading to 40% loss of her visual acuity.

At the 2015 IBSA World Championships and Games in Seoul, South Korea, she took a bronze medal in the +70 kg event. She won the gold medal in the heavyweight (+70 kg) event at the 2015 IBSA European Judo Championships in Odivelas, Portugal. She obtained so a quota spot for the Judo at the 2016 Summer Paralympics in Rio de Janeiro, Brazil.

Taşbağ was the flag bearer at the parade of nations of Rio de Janeiro 2016. She won a bronze medal at the 2016 Summer Paralympics in Rio de Janeiro, Brazil.

Paralympics
Preceded by Gizem Girişmen	Flagbearer for Turkey; Rio de Janeiro 2016	Succeeded by incumbent
