= Wang Lijing =

Chinese judoka (born 1989)

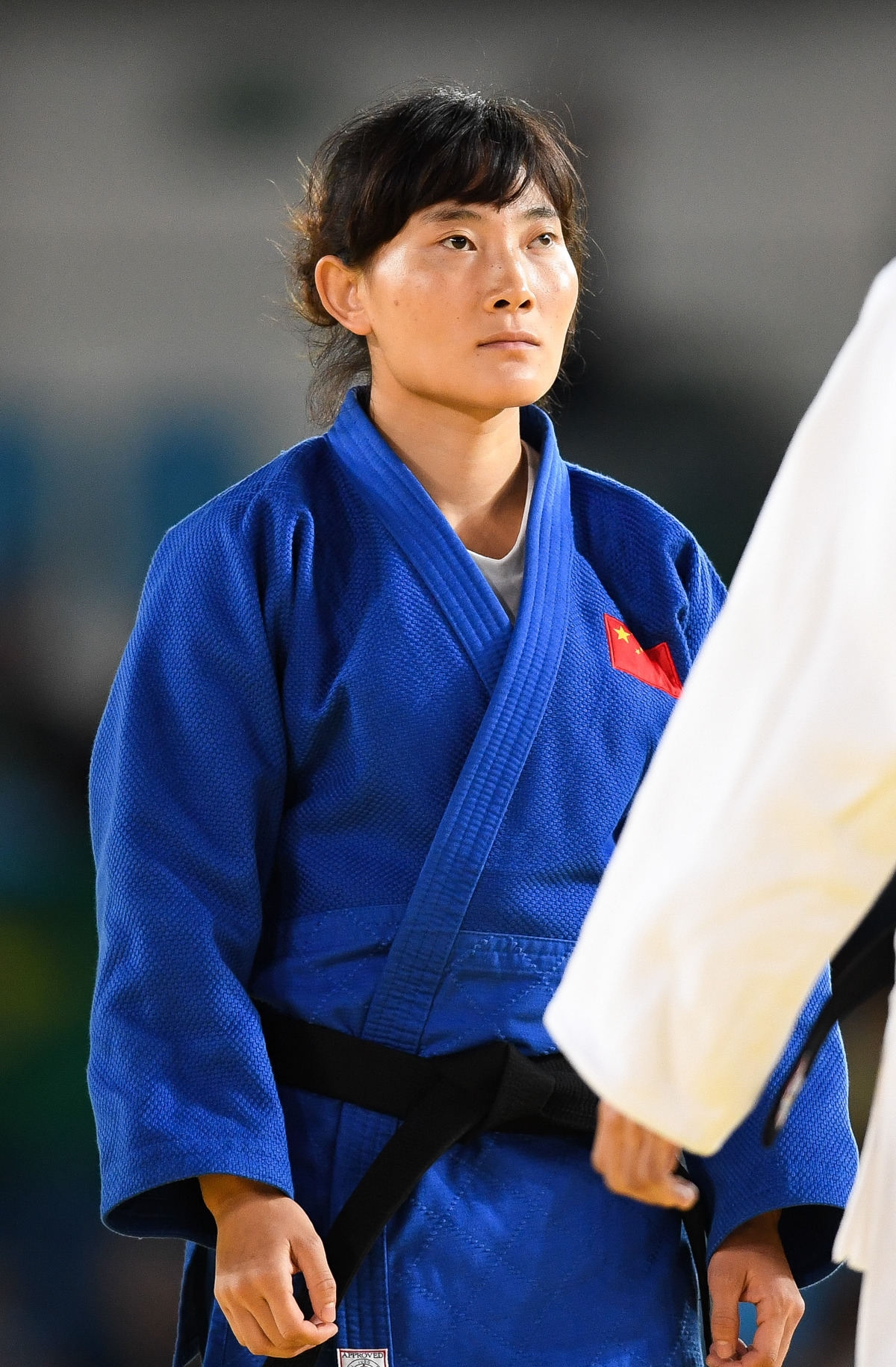
- Wang at the 2016 Paralympics

Personal information
- Born: 10 April 1989 (age 37)
- Occupation: Judoka

Sport
- Sport: Judo
Medal record
Women's judo
Representing China
Paralympic Games
Gold medal – first place	2008 Beijing	-57 kg
Silver medal – second place	2012 London	-52 kg
IBSA World Championships
Bronze medal – third place	2015 Colorado	-57 kg
Asian Para Games
Gold medal – first place	2010 Guangzhou	-57 kg
Gold medal – first place	2014 Incheon	-57 kg

Profile at external databases
- JudoInside.com: 36788

Wang Lijing (born 10 April 1989) is a visually impaired Chinese judoka. She competed in the 52 or 57 kg division at the 2008, 2012 and 2016 Paralympics and won a gold medal in 2008 and a silver in 2012. She placed third at the 2003 Fukuoka Tournament as a non-disabled athlete.

== Life ==
Wang was born in 1989 and as a six year old young girl one of her eyes was accidentally damaged by a knife. Having lost the sight in one eye, she then had her eyesight damaged in the other eye due to the wrong medical care. She was born in Tianjin Municipality and she attended a school there for visually impaired children. She discovered she liked goalball where she had to use hearing and touch instead of sight.

She started to learn to be a judoka in 2002 and the following year she was placed second in the national women's judo 57-kg class for para-athletes. She continued to train and enter competitions and in 2008 she took the gold medal in the 57 kg class at the Beijing Paralympic Games in 2008. She beat Ramona Brussig of Germany to win the class. After this she decided to concentrate at the 52 kg class although this means that she has to have a strict diet.

Wang took silver at the 2012 Summer Paralympics in London. She was beaten to the 52 kg class gold medal by Ramona Brussig.
