= Judo at the 2004 Summer Paralympics – Women's 57 kg =

Judo - Women's up to 57 kg at the XII Paralympic Games
- Paralympic Judo
- Venue: Ano Liossia Olympic Hall
- Dates: 19 September 2004
- Competitors: 6 from 6 nations

Medalists
| 1st place, gold medalist(s) | | Ramona Brussig | Germany |
| 2nd place, silver medalist(s) | | Marta Arce Payno | Spain |
| 3rd place, bronze medalist(s) | | Ekaterina Buzmakova | Russia |
| 3rd place, bronze medalist(s) | | Daniele Silva | Brazil |

The Women's up to 57 kg judo competition at the 2004 Summer Paralympics was held on 19 September at the Ano Liossia Olympic Hall.

The tournament bracket consisted of a single-elimination contest culminating in a gold medal match. There was also a repechage to determine the winners of the two bronze medals. As there were only 6 contestants in total the repechage consisted of just the two bronze medal bouts.

The event was won by Ramona Brussig, representing Germany.

== Results ==
The four digits represent scores of ippon, waza-ari, yuko and koka (which was still used at the time). A letter indicates a penalty of shido, chui, keikoku or hansoku make, which (at the time) also registered a score of koka, yuko, waza-ari or ippon, respectively, to the opponent. Penalties are escalated, thus 2 shido = chui, 3 shido = keikoku, 4 shido = hansoku make, save that a penalty of hansoku make direct results in exclusion from the remainder of the competition, while if it results from escalation it does not.

=== Competition bracket ===
Quarterfinals
Lei Li Ping (CHN) | 0200
Ekaterina Buzmakova (RUS) | 0000
Marta Arce Payno (ESP) | 1111S
Daniele Silva (BRA) | 0001

Semifinals
Lei Li Ping (CHN) | 0000
Ramona Brussig (GER) | 1000
Marta Arce Payno (ESP) | 1000
Maria Keramida (GRE) | 0000

Finals
Ramona Brussig (GER) | 1000
Marta Arce Payno (ESP) | 0000

=== Repechage ===
Bronze medal matches
Ekaterina Buzmakova (RUS) | 1000
Maria Keramida (GRE) | 0000
Daniele Silva (BRA) | 1000
Lei Li Ping (CHN) | 0000
