= Judo at the 2012 Summer Paralympics – Women's 57 kg =

Judo – Women's 57 kg at the XIV Paralympic Games
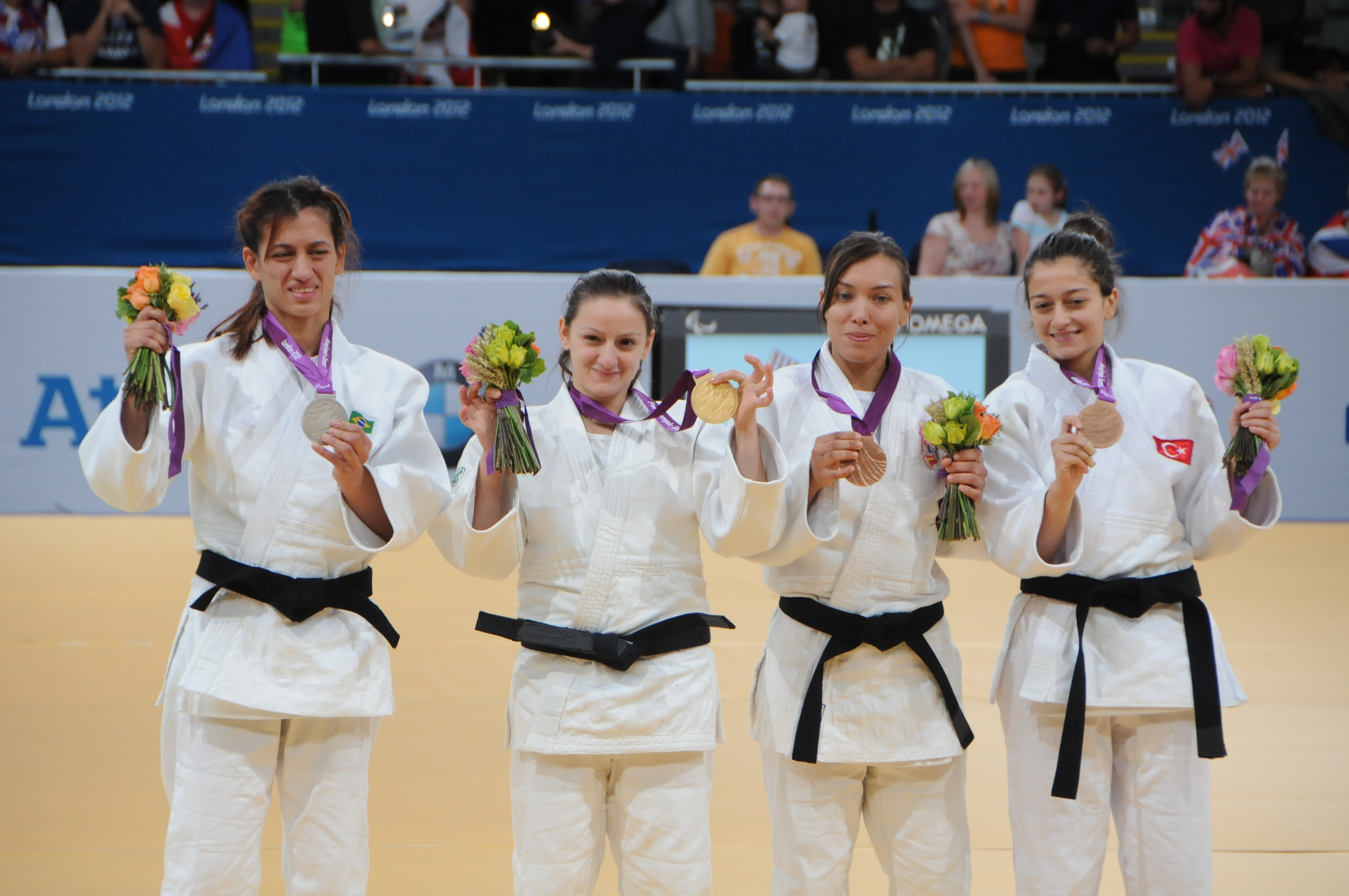
- Awarding ceremony
- Venue: ExCeL London
- Date: 31 August 2012
- Competitors: 6 from 6 nations

Medalists
1st place, gold medalist(s)		Afag Sultanova	Azerbaijan
2nd place, silver medalist(s)		Lucia da Silva Teixeira	Brazil
3rd place, bronze medalist(s)		Monica Merenciano Herrero	Spain
3rd place, bronze medalist(s)		Duygu Çete	Turkey

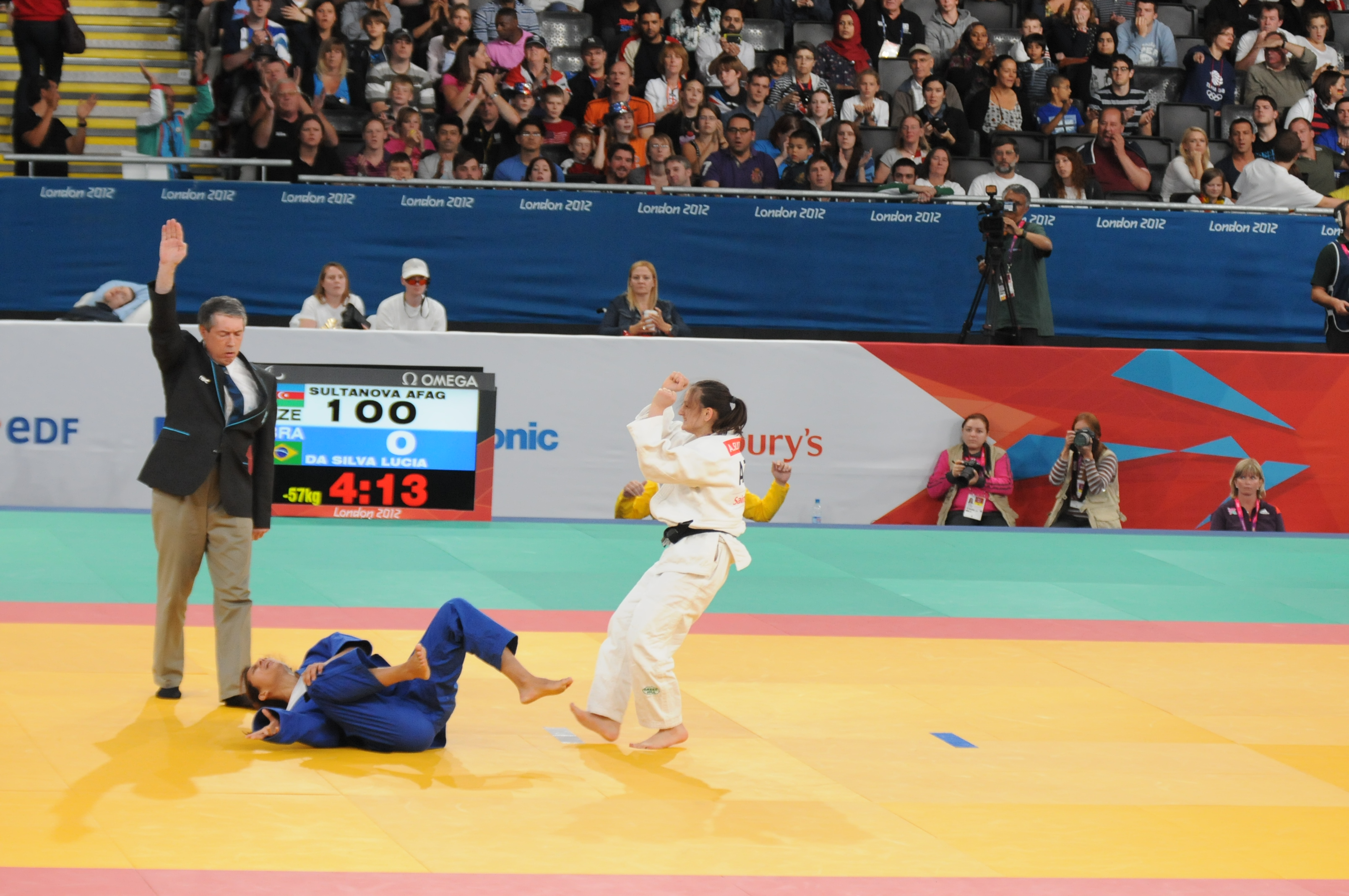
Afag Sultanova (AZE) won Lucia da Silva Teixeira (BRA) in the final

The women's 57 kg judo competition at the 2012 Summer Paralympics was held on 31 August at ExCeL London.

== Results ==
Quarterfinals
Mayumi Yoneda (JPN)	000
Duygu Cete (TUR)	100
Marion Coadou (FRA)	000
Afag Sultanova (AZE)	100
Cynthia Paige Simon (USA)	000
Monica Merenciano Herrero (ESP)	101
Lucia da Silva Teixeira (BRA)
BYE

Semifinals
Duygu Cete (TUR)	0001
Afag Sultanova (AZE)	002
Monica Merenciano Herrero (ESP)	0002
Lucia da Silva Teixeira (BRA)	1011

Final
Afag Sultanova (AZE)	100
Lucia da Silva Teixeira (BRA)	000

=== Repechage ===
Repechage
Mayumi Yoneda (JPN)	000
Marion Coadou (FRA)	100
Cynthia Paige Simon (USA)

Bronze medal finals
Marion Coadou (FRA)	0002
Monica Merenciano Herrero (ESP)	1011
Cynthia Paige Simon (USA)	0002
Duygu Cete (TUR)	014
