= Cynthia Paige Simon =

American Paralympic judoka

Cindy Simon
Personal information
- Full name: Cynthia Paige Simon
- Born: October 21, 1970 (age 55)
- Home town: Wayne, New Jersey, U.S.
- Occupation: Judoka
- Height: 5 ft 2 in (157 cm)

Sport
- Country: United States
- Sport: Para judo
- Disability class: B3
- Weight class: 57 kg
- Club: Kokushikai Judo Academy, Fair Lawn, New Jersey
- Coached by: Celita Schutz
Medal record
Para judo
Representing United States
Parapan American Games
Silver medal – second place	2011 Guadalajara	Women's -57kg
Pan Am Championships
Bronze medal – third place	2018 Calgary	Women's -57kg

Profile at external databases
- JudoInside.com: 89830

Cynthia "Cindy" Paige Simon (born October 21, 1970) is an American visually impaired retired Paralympic judoka who competed in international level events. She was also a former swimmer from 1984 to 2000.
