= Alesia Stepaniuk =

Russian Paralympic judoka (born 1985)

Personal information
- Born: 23 June 1985 (age 41)
- Occupation: Judoka

Sport
- Country: Russia
- Sport: Para judo
Medal record
Representing RPC
Paralympic Games
Bronze medal – third place	2020 Tokyo	52 kg
Representing Russia
Paralympic Games
Bronze medal – third place	2008 Beijing	52 kg

Profile at external databases
- IJF: 65017

Alesia Stepaniuk (born 23 June 1985) is a Russian Paralympic judoka. She won one of the bronze medals in the women's 52 kg event at the 2020 Summer Paralympics held in Tokyo, Japan. She competed at the Summer Paralympics under the flag of the Russian Paralympic Committee.

She also won one of the bronze medals in the women's 52 kg event at the 2008 Summer Paralympics held in Beijing, China. At the 2012 Summer Paralympics in London, United Kingdom, she lost her bronze medal match in that same event.
