= Duygu Çete =

Turkish judoka (born 1989)

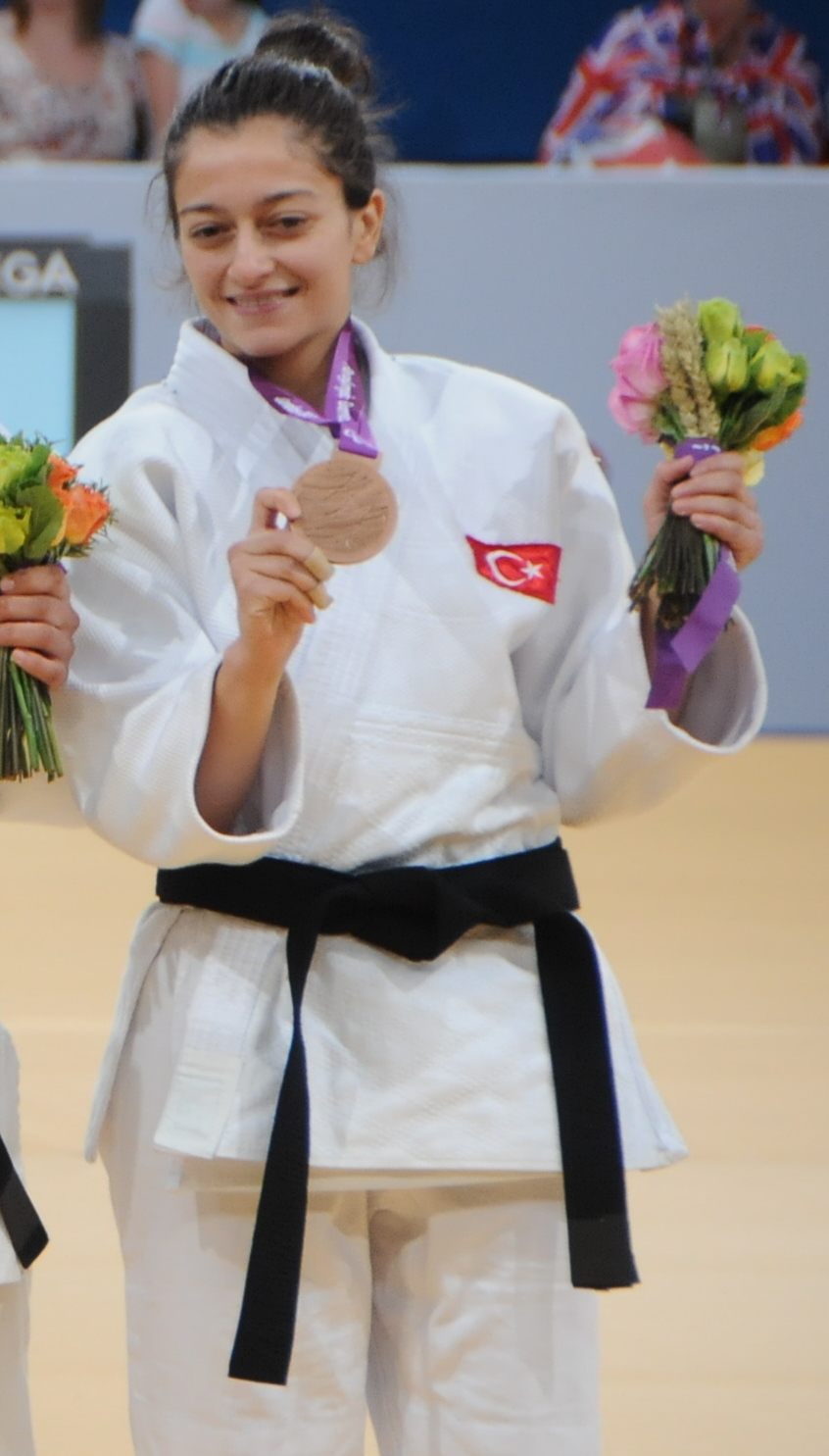
- Duygu Çete at the 2012 Summer Paralympics

Personal information
- Full name: Duygu Çete Artar
- Nationality: Turkish
- Born: 19 April 1989 (age 37) Gümüşhane, Turkey
- Occupation: Judoka
- Height: 168 cm (5 ft 6 in) (2012)
- Weight: 57 kg (126 lb) (2012)

Sport
- Country: Turkey
- Sport: Para judo
- Event: 57 kg
- Club: İzmir Büyükşehir Belediyespor
- Coached by: Mesut Kapan [club], Yavuz Yolcu [national]

Achievements and titles
- Paralympic Games: 2012
Medal record
Women's para judo
Representing Turkey
Paralympic Games
Bronze medal – third place	2012 London	−57 kg

Profile at external databases
- IJF: 65012
- JudoInside.com: 123025

Duygu Çete Artar (born 19 April 1989, in Gümüşhane, Turkey) is a Turkish female visually impaired judoka (disability class B3) competing in the -57 kg division. She won the bronze medal at the 2012 Paralympics.

== Career history ==
She represented her country at the 2008 Summer Paralympics in Athens, Greece without advancing to the finals. In 2008, Duygu Çete took a bronze medal at the European Championship in Hungary and another bronze medal at the International Tournament in Germany. The following year, she won a silver medal at the International Tournament in Germany. At the 2010 World Championships in Antalya, Turkey, she won a bronze medal in the individual event and a silver medal in the team event. Çete won a silver medal at the 2011 European Championships in London.

== Achievements ==
Year	Competition	Venue	Position	Event	Notes
Representing Turkey
2008	IBSA European Championship	Hungary	3rd	-57 kg	
2008	IDEM German Open	Aschaffenburg, Germany	3rd	-57 kg	
2009	IDEM German Open	Germany	2nd	-57 kg	
2010	IBSA World Championship	Antalya, Turkey	3rd	-57 kg	team
2010	IBSA World Team Championship	Antalya, Turkey	2nd	-57 kg	
2011	IBSA European Championship	London, United Kingdom	2nd	-57 kg	
2012	Summer Paralympics	London, United Kingdom	3rd	-57 kg	
