= Sabina Abdullayeva =

Azerbaijani judoka (born 1996)

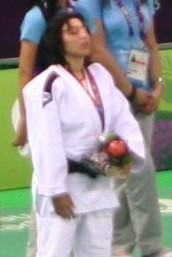

Personal information
- Citizenship: Azerbaijani
- Born: May 30, 1996 (age 30) Sumgayit
- Height: 157 cm (5 ft 2 in)
- Weight: 57 kg (126 lb)

Sport
- Disability: Blind
- Disability class: B2
Medal record
Women's Judo
Representing Azerbaijan
IBSA World Judo Championships
Silver medal – second place	2014 Colorado Springs	57 kg
European Games
Silver medal – second place	2015 Baku	57 kg
IBSA European Judo Championships
Silver medal – second place	2015 Odivelas	57 kg

Sabina Abdullayeva (Azerbaijani: Səbinə Xanlar qızı Abdullayeva, born May 30, 1996) – Azerbaijani paralympic judoka in the under-57 kilograms weight category and B2 classification for blindness, is the vice World Champion 2014 and silver medalist of the European championships 2015 and the 2015 European Games in Baku. For great achievements in the first European Games and services in the development of sports in Azerbaijan Sabina Abdullaeva was awarded the medal of "Progress". Representing Azerbaijan at the 2016 Summer Paralympics in Rio de Janeiro.
