= Gülhan Kılıç =

Turkish Paralympic judoka (born 1989)

Personal information
- Born: 5 May 1989 (age 37)
- Occupation: Judoka

Sport
- Country: Turkey
- Sport: Para judo
Medal record
Para judo
Representing Turkey
European Championships
Silver medal – second place	2011 Crawley	Women's -52kg
Bronze medal – third place	2009 Debrecen	Women's -52kg
Bronze medal – third place	2013 Eger	Women's -52kg
Bronze medal – third place	2015 Lisbon	Women's -57kg

Profile at external databases
- JudoInside.com: 89786

Gülhan Kılıç (born 5 May 1989) is a Turkish former para judoka who competed at international judo competitions. She is a four-time European medalist and has competed at the 2012 Summer Paralympics where she lost in the first round to eventual champion Ramona Brussig and in the first repechage to bronze medalist Michele Ferreira. She has also competed at the 2015 European Games but did not medal.
