= Turkey at the 2014 Winter Paralympics =

- IPC code: TUR
- NPC: Turkish Paralympic Committee
- Website: www.tmpk.org.tr (in Turkish)

in Sochi
- Competitors: 2 in 1 sport
- Medals: Gold 0 Silver 0 Bronze 0 Total 0

Winter Paralympics appearances (overview)
- 2014; 2018; 2022–2026

Turkey sent a delegation to compete at the 2014 Winter Paralympics in Sochi, Russia, held between 7–16 March 2014. This marked the nation's first participation in the Winter Paralympic Games. Turkey sent two athletes; Mehmet Çekiç and Hilmi Esat Bayindirli; both were competitors in alpine skiing. The nation's best finish in any event was 18th, by Bayindirli in the men's sitting giant slalom.

== Background ==
Turkey made its debut in the Summer Paralympics at the 1992 Barcelona Games. After not participating four years later, they have participated in every other Summer Paralympics to date, as of 2016. Turkey has sent a delegation to most Winter Olympics between their debut at the 1936 edition and the 2014 Games, skipping only 1952, 1972, and 1980. However, this was their first appearance at a Winter Paralympics. Mehmet Çekiç was chosen as the Turkish flagbearer for the parade of nations during the opening ceremony. He was also the flagbearer for the closing ceremony.

== Disability classification ==
Every participant at the Paralympics has their disability grouped into one of five disability categories; amputation, the condition may be congenital or sustained through injury or illness; cerebral palsy; wheelchair athletes, there is often overlap between this and other categories; visual impairment, including blindness; Les autres, any physical disability that does not fall strictly under one of the other categories, for example dwarfism or multiple sclerosis. Each Paralympic sport then has its own classifications, dependent upon the specific physical demands of competition. Events are given a code, made of numbers and letters, describing the type of event and classification of the athletes competing. Events with "B" in the code are for athletes with visual impairment, codes LW1 to LW9 are for athletes who stand to compete and LW10 to LW12 are for athletes who compete sitting down. Alpine skiing events grouped athletes into separate competitions for sitting, standing and visually impaired athletes.

== Alpine skiing ==
Mehmet Çekiç was 44 years old at the time of these Games. He is classified as LW4, which is defined by the International Paralympic Committee (IPC) as "skiers in this sport class include those with impairments in the lower parts of one leg". As an LW4, he competes while standing. On 13 March 2014, he competed in the slalom competition, and recorded a time of 2 minutes and 34 seconds, which was the slowest time in the field of 35 athletes who finished both runs of the race. The race was won by Alexey Bugaev in a time of 1 minute 38 seconds. Two days later in the giant slalom, he finished both runs in a total time of 3 minutes and 9 seconds, good for 28th place out of 29 competitors who finished the race. The race winning time was 2 minutes and 25 seconds.

Hilmi Esat Bayindirli was 51 years old at the time. He is classified as LW11, defined by the IPC as "skiers have a leg impairment and fair trunk control, which enables them to balance even when moving sideways." As an LW11, he competes while in a sitting position. On 15 March 2014, he competed in the giant slalom, finishing 18th out of 23 competitors who completed both runs; with a combined time of 3 minutes and 0 seconds. The winning time for the event was 2 minutes, 32 seconds.

Athlete	Event	Run 1			Run 2			Final/Total		
Athlete	Event	Time	Diff	Rank	Time	Diff	Rank	Time	Diff	Rank
Hilmi Esat Bayindirli	Giant slalom, sitting	1:31.71	+13.61	24	1:28.33	+14.23	18	3:00.04	+27.31	18
Mehmet Çekiç	Slalom, standing	1:12.53	+24.84	41	1:21.89	+30.61	35	2:34.42	+55.45	35
Mehmet Çekiç	Giant slalom, standing	1:38.38	+23.66	33	1:31.35	+20.20	28	3:09.73	+43.86	28

== See also ==
- Turkey at the Paralympics
- Turkey at the 2014 Winter Olympics
