= María Monica Merenciano =

Spanish Paralympic judoka

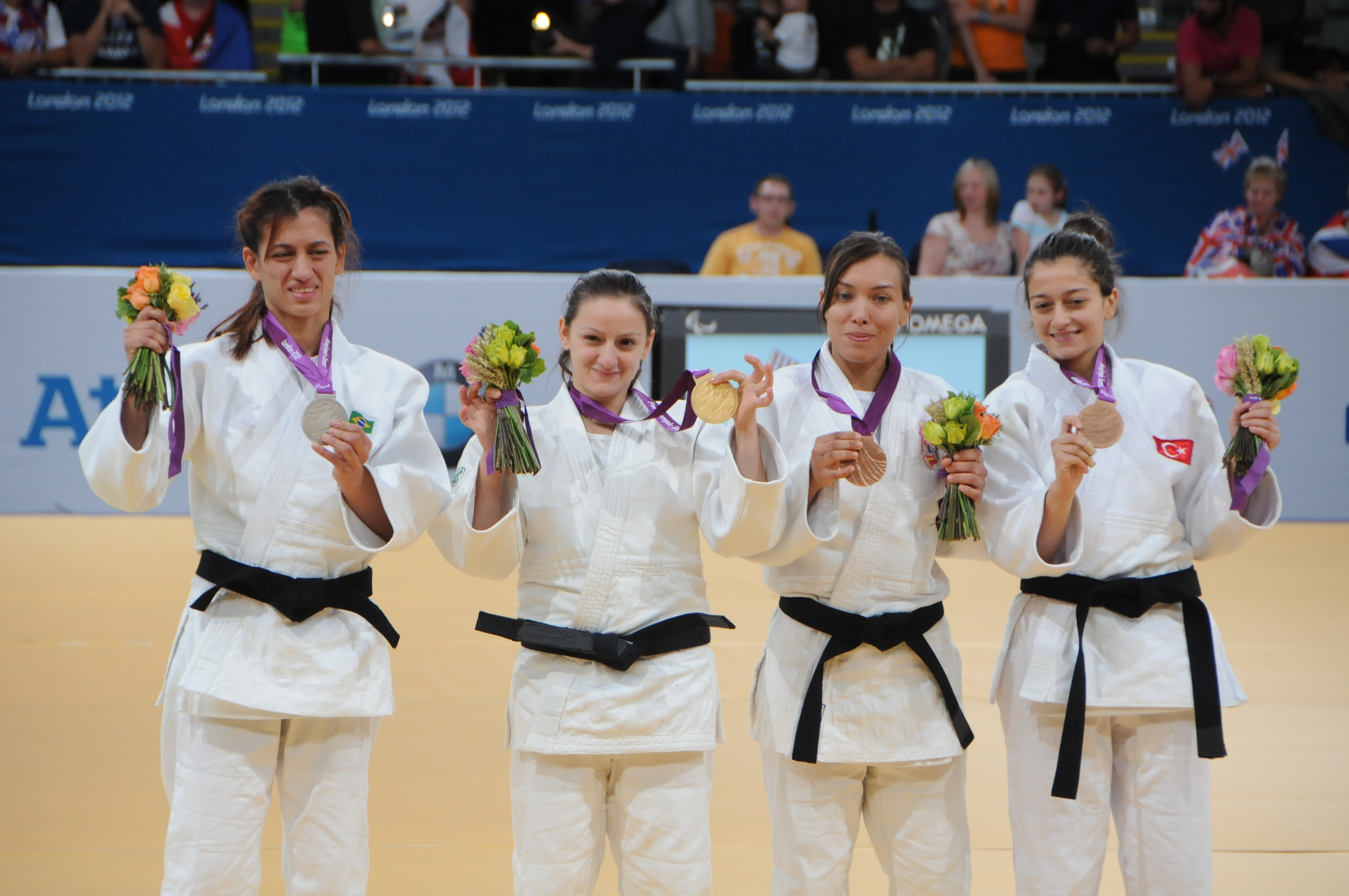
- Merenciano in 2012 (second from right)

Personal information
- Full name: María Monica Merenciano Herrero
- Nationality: Spanish
- Born: 1 August 1984 (age 41) Lliria, Valencia, Spain
- Occupation: Judoka

Sport
- Country: Spain
- Sport: Judo
Medal record
Women's judo
Representing Spain
Paralympic Games
Bronze medal – third place	2004 Athens	-63 kg
Bronze medal – third place	2008 Beijing	-57 kg
Bronze medal – third place	2012 London	-57 kg

María Monica Merenciano Herrero (born 1 August 1984) is a judo athlete from Spain. She has represented Spain at the Paralympic Games and won an IPC European Judo Championship.

== Personal ==
Merenciano was born in Lliria, Valencia, and she has a vision impairment.

== Judo ==
Merenciano is a B2 classified judoka.

In 2001, Ufa hosted the European Championships, and Merenciano won a bronze in her weight class. At the 2006 French hosted World Championships, she won a bronze medal. Baku hosted the 2007 edition of the IPC European Judo Championships where Merenciano took home a bronze medal. She won a bronze medal at the 2009 edition of the IPC European Championships hosted in Debrecen. She competed at the 2010 World Championships in Turkey where she won a bronze medal. In October 2011, she competed in a regional Spanish national vision impaired judo event in Guadalajara. At the Crawley hosted 2011 IPC European Judo Championships, she finished in first place. In November 2013, she competed in the Open Judo Tournament Guadalajara. The 2013 IPC European Judo Championships were held in early December in Eger, Hungary, and she competed in them in the under 57 kilos event. She was unable to retain her championship, but came away with a bronze medal.

=== Paralympics ===
Merenciano competed in judo at the 2004 Summer Paralympics and won a bronze medal in the Up to 63 kg women's group. She competed in the 2008 Summer Paralympics and 2012 Summer Paralympics and won a pair of bronze medals in the Up to 57 kg women in the event at both Games. The 2004 Games were the first time women's judo appeared on the Paralympic programme. Her bronze medal in London was won minutes before teammate Marta Arce Payno also won a bronze medal in judo.
