= Para-Ski =

Canadian aircraft manufacturer

- Company type: Private company
- Industry: Aerospace
- Founded: 1996
- Founder: Joe Albanese and Jacques Fleury
- Fate: Out of business circa 2011
- Headquarters: Mascouche, Quebec, Canada
- Products: Powered parachutes

Para-Ski International was a Canadian aircraft manufacturer, based in Mascouche, Quebec. The company specialized in the design and construction of powered parachutes.

The company was formed in 1996 by Joe Albanese and Jacques Fleury. The company went out of business in about 2011.

Para-Skis designs have won numerous awards, including the "Ultralight Innovation" award at Sun 'n Fun 1999, the "Best Type Para-Wing" award at Sun 'n Fun 2000, the "Best Flex Wing" award at Oshkosh AirVenture 2000, the "Ultralight Innovation" award at Sun 'n Fun 2002, the "Best Commercial Ultralight Award" at Sun 'n Fun 2003 and the "Reserve Grand Champion Ultralight Award" at Sun 'n Fun 2003.

== Aircraft ==
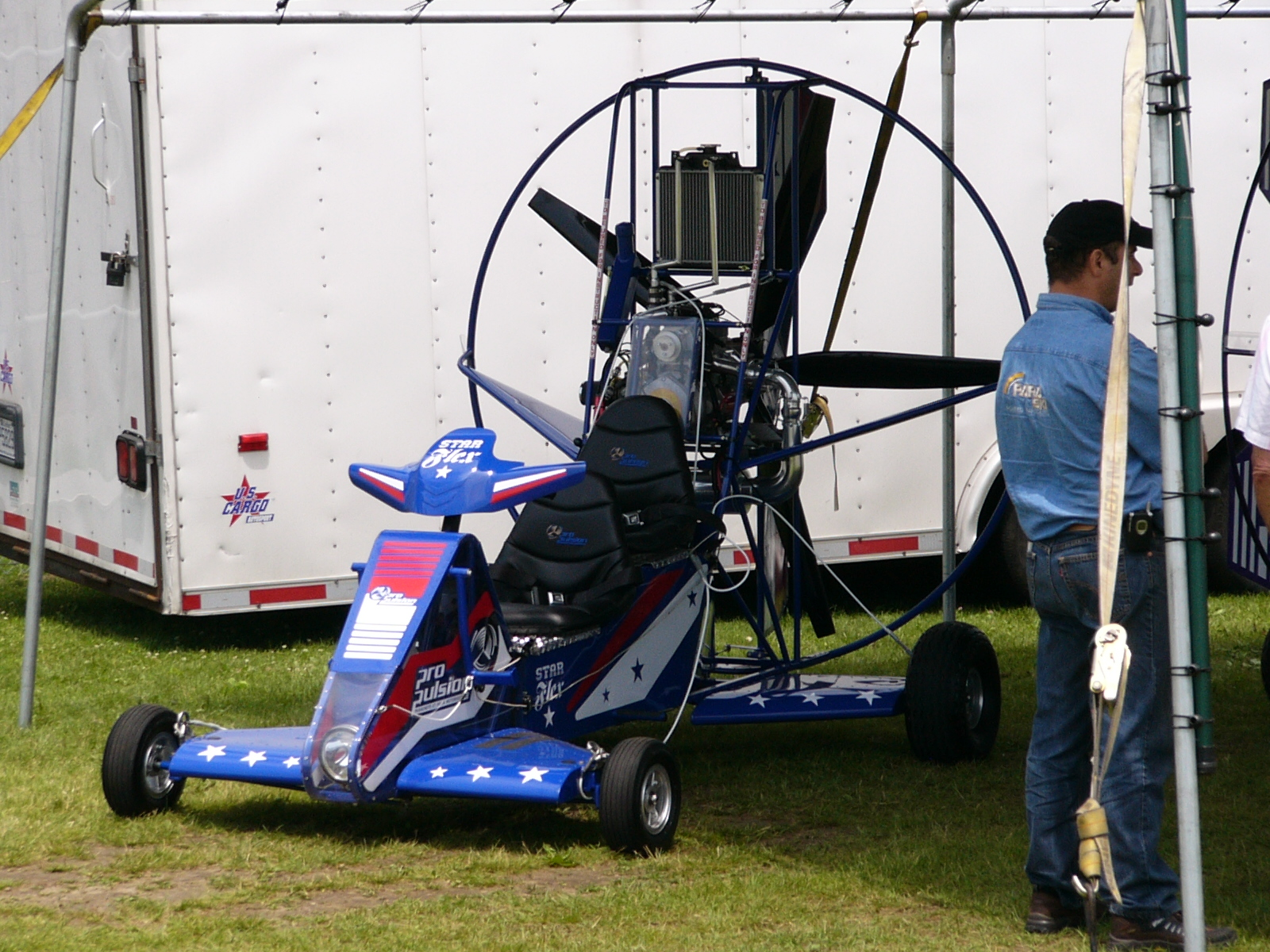
Para-Ski Star-Flex

Summary of aircraft built by Para-Ski
Model name	First flight	Number built	Type
Para-Ski XS			powered parachute
Para-Ski VX			powered parachute
Para-Ski Flex			powered parachute
Para-Ski Re-Flex			powered parachute
Para-Ski Freedom 103			powered parachute
Para-Ski Star-Flex			powered parachute
Para-Ski Top Gun			powered parachute
