= Ekaterina Buzmakova =

Russian Paralympic judoka

Personal information
- Born: 20 November 1982 (age 43)
- Occupation: Para judoka

Sport
- Country: Russia
- Sport: Para judo
Medal record
Paralympic Games
Bronze medal – third place	2004 Athens	57 kg

Profile at external databases
- JudoInside.com: 89731

Ekaterina Buzmakova (born 20 November 1982) is a Russian para judoka. She represented Russia at the 2004 Summer Paralympics and at the 2008 Summer Paralympics and she won the bronze medal in the women's 57 kg event in 2004.
