= Turkey at the 2018 Winter Paralympics =

- IPC code: TUR
- NPC: Turkish Paralympic Committee
- Website: www.tmpk.org.tr (in Turkish)

in Pyeongchang
- Competitors: 1 in 1 sport
- Medals: Gold 0 Silver 0 Bronze 0 Total 0

Winter Paralympics appearances (overview)
- 2014; 2018; 2022–2026

Turkey sent a competitor to the 2018 Winter Paralympics in Pyeongchang, South Korea. Their sole competitor was alpine skier Mehmet Çekiç. Turkey made an effort to qualify in other sports, including wheelchair curling, but proved unable to win spots in the Games for those. Turkey is a recent competitor as nations go, making its first Winter Paralympics appearance at the 2014 Games.

== Team ==
In December 2017, the National Paralympic Committee of Turkey announced that one person would go to Pyeongchang. Alpine skier Mehmet Çekiç was the person selected. The National Paralympic Committee provided Çekiç with all the resources he needed. This was done with assistance from Turkey's national ski federation. The country wanted to send more people to South Korea for the Games. People had problems with the qualifications for the Games. The President of the National Paralympic Committee of Turkey said they wanted to send more people to the 2022 Winter Paralympics. They would work hard to make that happen. Financial problems and being responsible for 18 sports made securing more positions for Pyeongchang difficult.

The table below contains the list of members of people (called "Team Turkey") that will be participating in the 2018 Games.

Team Turkey
Name	Sport	Gender	Classification	Events	ref
Mehmet Çekiç	para-alpine skiing	male			

Turkey tried to go to the 2018 Winter Paralympics in wheelchair curling. Turkey Physically Disabled Sports Federation Wheelchair Curling was created a year before the ability to get the right to go by winning the Wheelchair Curling World Championships B Tournament. The team had many problems, and did not do well. They did not earn the right to compete. The team was coached by Gökçe Ulugay. It included wheelchair curlers Züleyha Bingöl, Kenan Coşkun, Serpil Arslan, Mesut Güle and Turan Akalın. The competition was the first international tournament Turkey participated in.

Skiers from Turkey also tried to get the right to go to Pyeongchang. Like wheelchair curlers in Turkey, the skiers had many challenges. They were not able to get the right to compete.

== Para-alpine skiing ==
=== Schedule and results ===
The first event on the para-alpine program is the downhill. It starts on 10 March, running from 9:30 AM to 1:30 PM. The second event on the program is Super-G. All skiers will race between 9:30 AM and 1:00 PM on 11 March. The super combined takes place on 13 March. The Super-G part of the event is in the morning. The slalom part is in the afternoon. The slalom event gets underway on 14 March and conclude on 15 March. Women and men both race during the same sessions in the morning. The afternoon sessions start with the women doing their second run. Then the men go. The last para-alpine skiing race of the 2018 Games is the giant slalom. It takes place on 17–18 March. Men and women both race at the same time in the morning sessions. Women race first in the afternoon sessions, with the men racing a half hour after they end.

== History ==
Turkey went to the 2014 Winter Paralympics. It was the first time Turkey competed at the Winter Paralympics. The Winter Sports division of the National Paralympic Committee was created in 2012. This was two years before the start of the 2014 Winter Paralympics. Esat Hilmi Bayindir earned the right to go. Because of a process to help countries that are underrepresented at the Paralympics, Mehmet Çekiç was invited to participate. This process is called Bipartite Invitation. Esat Hilmi Bayindir was in a traffic accident. Because of this, he has a disability. At the time of the 2014 Winter Paralympics, the skier was living in the United States. He started skiing in 1982. Mehmet Çekiç started skiing in France in 2011. In 2013, Çekiç went to alpine skiing competition in France and Italy. Because of a traffic accident in 2009, he has a disability. After the 2014 Winter Paralympics, Turkey hoped they could go to the 2018 Winter Paralympics.

== Tickets ==
The only authorized ticket seller in Turkey for the Paralympic Games was Setur.
