= Mehmet Çekiç =

Turkish Paralympic alpine skier

Personal information
- Full name: Mehmet Bayram Çekiç
- Nationality: Turkish
- Born: 1 January 1970 (age 55); Istanbul, Turkey

Sport
- Sport: Para alpine skiing
- Disability class: LW4
- Event(s): Men's slalom, standing Men's giant slalom, standing

Mehmet Çekiç (born 1 January 1970) is a Turkish Paralympic alpine skier who competes in the LW4 disability class of men's slalom, standing and giant slalom, standing events. He represented his country, Turkey, at the 2014 Sochi and 2018 PyeongChang Paralympics.

== Private life ==
Mehmet Çekiç was born on 1 January 1970. He graduated from the University of Upper Alsace in Colmar, France. He lives in France, where he owns and manages a butchers and grocery shop in Barr, Bas-Rhin, France. He has one son.

In 2009, he was involved in a motorcycle accident, which resulted in his disability after his leg was amputated mid-shinbone, below the knee.

== Sports career ==
Before he became disabled, Çekiç performed weightlifting between 1993 and 1996, and competed at national level in France. He became also a champion.

Alpine skiing was his favorite hobby, even before his accident, due to the proximity of his residence to the mountains. In 2010, he began Para-alpine skiing in France, and debuted internationally for Turkey in the United States in 2013. He is classified as LW4, which is a disability class for Para-skiers with disability in one lower extremity. Çekiç is a member of the ski club in Le Hohwald, Bas-Rhin, France, where he acts also as a skiing instructor. He is coached by French Dany Iselin and Turkish Ersin Beyduz.

Following training in Canada and the United States, after his participation at a competition in Rinn, Tyrol, Austria he qualified to start at the 2014 Winter Paralympics in Sochi, Russia. After a two-week camp in Turkey, he took part at the Paralympics with a teammate. At the 2018 Winter Paralympics in PyeongChang, South Korea, he represented Turkey alone. Çekiç was the flag bearer at the parade of nations of Sochi 2014, and PyeongChang 2018.

Paralympics
| Preceded by Did not participate | Flagbearer for Turkey; Sochi 2014, PyeongChang 2018 | Succeeded by Incumbent |
