= Ramona Brussig =

German judoka (born 1977)

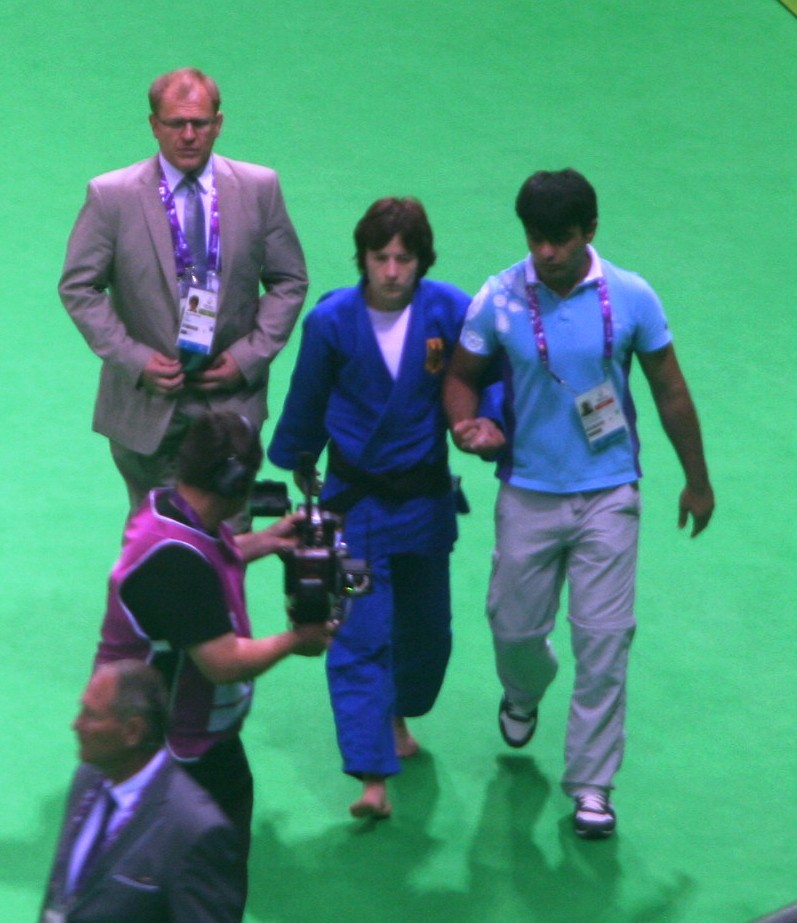
- Ramona Brussig at the 2015 European Games

Personal information
- Born: 20 May 1977 (age 49) Leipzig, East Germany
- Occupation: Judoka
- Height: 1.67 m (5 ft 6 in)
- Weight: 52 kg (115 lb)

Sport
- Country: Germany
- Sport: Judo
- Club: PSV Schwerin
- Turned pro: 1998
- Coached by: Carmen Bruckman
Medal record
Judo
Paralympic Games
| Gold medal – first place | 2004 Athens | -57 kg |
| Gold medal – first place | 2012 London | -52 kg |
| Silver medal – second place | 2008 Beijing | -57 kg |
| Silver medal – second place | 2016 Rio | -52 kg |
European Para Championships
| Bronze medal – third place | 2023 Rotterdam | -57kg J2 |

Profile at external databases
- JudoInside.com: 23322

Ramona Brussig (20 May 1977) is a German judoka and two-time gold medal winner in Paralympic competition.

== Career ==
She was born in Leipzig with visual impairments meaning that she competes in B2 classification events. Brussig has an identical twin sister, Carmen Brussig, also a gold medal-winning visually-impaired judoka, who was born 15 minutes before her. Brussig began training in 1986 at the age of nine and made her senior international debut in 1998 at the World Games in Madrid. Though her sister lives in Switzerland, the pair like to meet up and train together when they can. They say that they do not have a sense of rivalry as they compete in different weight classes.

Brussig won gold in the under 57 kg weight class at the 2004 Games in Athens, her first Paralympic Games, against Spanish judoka Marta Arce Payno. She then won silver four years later in Beijing, losing to Wang Lijing in the final. Brussig and Wang both dropped down a weight class to under 52 kg for the 2012 Summer Paralympics in London, meeting each other again in the final. This time Brussig was triumphant, going home with the gold. Brussig defended her title at the Rio 2016 and finished as runner-up to French judoka Sandrine Martinet, earning her a silver medal.

Through her career Brussig has won four world titles and six European titles. Both she and her sister won gold at the 2012 Summer Paralympics. Both sisters are listed amongst the most promising German medal candidates for the 2020 Summer Paralympics in Tokyo, resulting in them being given financial support in their endeavours.

Brussig works for the sports association of Mecklenburg-Vorpommern, a state in northern Germany.

== Competitive results ==
As of 2017:

Paralympic Games

- 2016 - 2nd place
- 2012 - 1st place
- 2008 - 2nd place
- 2004 - 1st place

World Championships

- 2014 - 2nd place
- 2011 - 3rd place
- 2010 - 1st place
- 2007 - 3rd place singles and team
- 2006 - 1st place singles and team

European Championship

- 2013 - 1st place
- 2011 - 3rd place
- 2009 - 1st place
- 2007 - 1st place singles and team
- 2005 - 1st place singles and team
- 2001 - 1st place team
- 1999 - 1st place team

German championships

- 2014 - 1st place
- 2011 - 1st place
- 2009 - 1st place
- 2008 - 1st place
- 2007 - 1st place
- 2006 - 1st place
- 2005 - 1st place
- 2003 - 1st place
- 2002 - 1st place
- 2001 - 1st place
- 2000 - 1st place
- 1999 - 1st place
