= Michele Ferreira =

Brazilian Paralympic judoka (born 1984)

Personal information
- Full name: Michele Aparecida Ferreira
- Born: 18 November 1984 (age 41) Campo Grande, Brazil

Sport
- Country: Brazil
- Sport: Paralympic judo
- Disability: Toxoplasmosis
Medal record
Paralympic judo
Representing Brazil
Paralympic Games
Bronze medal – third place	2008 Beijing	Women's -48kg
Bronze medal – third place	2012 London	Women's -52kg
World Championships
Silver medal – second place	2006 Brommat	Women's -52kg
Parapan American Games
Gold medal – first place	2011 Guadalajara	Women's -52kg
Gold medal – first place	2015 Toronto	Women's -52kg

Michele Aparecida Ferreira (born 18 November 1984) is a Brazilian former Paralympic judoka who competed at international judo competitions. She is a two-time Paralympic bronze medalist and two-time Parapan American Games champion.
