= Taekwondo at the 2020 Summer Paralympics – Qualification =

Ranking lists begin from 1 January 2018 to 31 January 2020. Continental qualification tournaments will also determine which athlete would compete in the Summer Paralympics.

The qualification slots are allocated to the NPC not to the individual athlete. However, if it is through the Bipartite Commission Invitation, the qualification slot is allocated to the individual athlete, not to the NPC.

- They can be obtained in either through the K44 or K43 World Ranking List.
- An NPC can only allocate a maximum of six athletes (three male, three female) as long as they are on the world rankings list.
- An NPC can obtain slots through the Continental Qualifier Allocation with a maximum of four slots (two male, two female). The continental competitions are listed on the table below.
- An NPC can enter a maximum of one eligible athlete per medal event.
- K43 and K44 athletes are all competing together in one class.

Due to the COVID-19 pandemic, the Asian and European Qualification Tournaments were moved to different locations.

== Timeline ==
| Competition | Dates | Host |
|---|---|---|
| 2019 African Para Taekwondo Championships | 20 February 2019 | (Egypt) Hurghada |
| 2019 Pan Am Para Taekwondo Open Championships | 16 June 2019 | (United States) Portland |
| 2019 Oceania Para Taekwondo Championships | 28 June 2019 | (Australia) Gold Coast |
| 2019 Asian Para Open Taekwondo Championships | 18 July 2019 | (Jordan) Amman |
| 2019 European Para Taekwondo Open Championships | 31 October 2019 | (Italy) Bari |
| Ranking list | January 2021 | – |
| African Qualification Tournament | 24 February 2020 | (Morocco) Rabat |
| Oceania Qualification Tournament | 29 February 2020 | (Australia) Gold Coast |
| Americas Qualification Tournament | 10 March 2020 | (Costa Rica) San Jose |
| European Qualification Tournament | 9 May 2021 | (Bulgaria) Sofia |
| Asian Qualification Tournament | 16 May 2021 | (Jordan) Amman |

== Summary ==
| NPC | Men | | | Women | | | Total |
| NPC | 61 kg | 75 kg | +75 kg | 49 kg | 58 kg | +58 kg | Total |
|---|---|---|---|---|---|---|---|
| Argentina | | 1 | | | | | 1 |
| Australia | | 1 | | 1 | | 1 | 3 |
| Azerbaijan | 1 | 1 | | 1 | | 1 | 4 |
| Brazil | 1 | | | | 1 | 1 | 3 |
| China | | | | | 1 | | 1 |
| Croatia | | | 1 | | | | 1 |
| Denmark | | | | | 1 | | 1 |
| Egypt | 1 | | | | 1 | | 2 |
| France | 1 | | | | | 1 | 2 |
| Great Britain | | | 1 | | 1 | 1 | 3 |
| India | | | | 1 | | | 1 |
| Iran | | 1 | 1 | | | 1 | 3 |
| Italy | 1 | | | | | | 1 |
| Jamaica | | | | | 1 | | 1 |
| Japan | 1 | 1 | | | | 1 | 3 |
| Kazakhstan | | 1 | 1 | | 1 | | 3 |
| Libya | | | 1 | | | | 1 |
| Mexico | | 1 | 1 | | | 1 | 3 |
| Mongolia | 1 | | | 1 | | | 2 |
| Morocco | | | 1 | 1 | | 1 | 3 |
| Nepal | | | | | | 1 | 1 |
| Peru | | | | 1 | | | 1 |
| Philippines | | 1 | | | | | 1 |
| RPC | 1 | 1 | 1 | 1 | 1 | | 5 |
| Senegal | | 1 | | | | | 1 |
| Serbia | | | | 1 | 1 | | 2 |
| Solomon Islands | 1 | | | | | | 1 |
| South Korea | | 1 | | | | | 1 |
| Spain | 1 | | | | | | 1 |
| Thailand | | | | 1 | | | 1 |
| Turkey | 1 | 1 | 1 | 1 | 1 | 1 | 6 |
| Ukraine | | 1 | | 1 | | 1 | 3 |
| United States | | | 1 | | 1 | | 2 |
| Uzbekistan | 1 | | | 1 | | 1 | 3 |
| Total: 34 NPCs | 13 | 13 | 12 | 12 | 12 | 13 | 79 |

== Men's events ==
=== 61 kg ===
| Qualification | Country | Athlete |
|---|---|---|
| World Ranking | Mongolia | Ganbatyn Bolor-Erdene |
| World Ranking | Turkey | Mahmut Bozteke |
| World Ranking | RPC | Daniil Sidorov |
| World Ranking | Italy | Antonino Bossolo |
| World Ranking | France | Bopha Kong |
| World Ranking | Spain | Alejandro Vidal Alvarez |
| African Qualification | Egypt | Mohamed Elzayat |
| Oceanian Qualification | ~~Solomon Islands~~ | ~~Solomon Jagiri~~ |
| American Qualification | Brazil | Nathan Torquato |
| European Qualification | Azerbaijan | Imamaddin Khalilov |
| Asian Qualification | Uzbekistan | Zukhriddin Tokhirov |
| Bipartite Commission | Refugee Paralympic Team | Parfait Hakizimana |
| Host Nation | Japan | Mitsuya Tanaka |

=== 75 kg ===
| Qualification | Country | Athlete |
|---|---|---|
| World Ranking | RPC | Magomedzagir Isaldibirov |
| World Ranking | Mexico | Juan Diego Garcia Lopez |
| World Ranking | Iran | Mahdi Pourrahnama |
| World Ranking | Turkey | Fatih Çelik |
| World Ranking | Kazakhstan | Nurlan Dombayev |
| World Ranking | Ukraine | Anton Shvets |
| African Qualification | Senegal | Ibrahima Seye Sen |
| Oceanian Qualification | ~~Australia~~ | ~~Steven Currie~~ |
| American Qualification | Argentina | Juan Eduardo Samorano |
| European Qualification | Azerbaijan | Abulfaz Abuzarli |
| Asian Qualification | South Korea | Joo Jeong-hun |
| Bipartite Commission | Philippines | Allain Ganapin |
| Host Nation | Japan | Shunsuke Kudo |

=== +75 kg ===
| Qualification | Country | Athlete |
|---|---|---|
| World Ranking | United States | Evan Medell |
| World Ranking | RPC | Zainutdin Ataev |
| World Ranking | Croatia | Ivan Mikulic |
| World Ranking | Iran | Asghar Aziziaghdam |
| World Ranking | Turkey | Mehmet Vasıf Yakut |
| World Ranking | Morocco | Rachid Ismaili Alaoui |
| African Qualification | Libya | Mohamed Alsanousi Abidzar |
| American Qualification | Mexico | Francisco Pedroza |
| European Qualification | Great Britain | Matt Bush |
| Asian Qualification | Kazakhstan | Nyshan Omirali |
| Bipartite Commission | Aruba | Elliott Loonstra |
| Bipartite Commission | Costa Rica | Andres Esteban Molina Gomez |

== Women's events ==
=== 49 kg ===
| Qualification | Country | Athlete |
|---|---|---|
| World Ranking | Mongolia | Khürelbaataryn Enkhtuya |
| World Ranking | Turkey | Meryem Betül Çavdar |
| World Ranking | RPC | Anna Poddubskaia |
| World Ranking | Thailand | Khwansuda Phuangkitcha |
| World Ranking | Ukraine | Viktoriia Marchuk |
| World Ranking | Serbia | Danijela Jovanovic |
| African Qualification | Morocco | Soukaina Es-Sabbar |
| Oceanian Qualification | ~~Australia~~ | ~~Kara Fournie~~ |
| American Qualification | Peru | Leonor Espinoza Carranza |
| European Qualification | Azerbaijan | Royala Fataliyeva |
| Asian Qualification | Uzbekistan | Ziyodakhon Isakova |
| Bipartite Commission | Afghanistan | Zakia Khudadadi |
| Bipartite Commission | India | Aruna Tanwar |

=== 58 kg ===
| Qualification | Country | Athlete |
|---|---|---|
| World Ranking | Denmark | Lisa Gjessing |
| World Ranking | China | Li Yujie |
| World Ranking | Turkey | Gamze Gürdal |
| World Ranking | United States | Brianna Salinaro |
| World Ranking | RPC | Ayshat Ramazanova |
| World Ranking | Serbia | Marija Mičev |
| African Qualification | Egypt | Salma Ali |
| Oceanian Qualification | ~~Solomon Islands~~ | ~~Jeminah Otoa~~ |
| American Qualification | Brazil | Silvana Cardoso Fernandes |
| European Qualification | Great Britain | Beth Munro |
| Asian Qualification | Kazakhstan | Kamilya Dosmalova |
| Bipartite Commission | Jamaica | Shauna-Kay Hines |

=== +58 kg ===
| Qualification | Country | Athlete |
|---|---|---|
| World Ranking | Great Britain | Amy Truesdale |
| World Ranking | Brazil | Debora Menezes |
| World Ranking | France | Laura Schiel |
| World Ranking | Uzbekistan | Guljonoy Naimova |
| World Ranking | Ukraine | Yuliya Lypetska |
| World Ranking | Turkey | Şeyma Emeksiz Bacaksız |
| African Qualification | Morocco | Fajar Akermach |
| Oceanian Qualification | Australia | Janine Watson |
| American Qualification | Mexico | Daniela Andrea Martinez |
| European Qualification | Azerbaijan | Aynur Mammadova |
| Asian Qualification | Iran | Rayehe Shahab |
| Bipartite Commission | Nepal | Palesha Goverdhan |
| Host Nation | Japan | Shoko Ota |
