= Taekwondo at the 2024 Summer Paralympics =

Taekwondo at the XVII Paralympic Games
- Paralympic Taekwondo
- Venue: Grand Palais
- Dates: 29–31 August 2024
- Competitors: 121 athletes in 10 events from 54 nations

Taekwondo at the 2024 Summer Paralympics was held at the Grand Palais. This was the second time that taekwondo was included in the Summer Paralympic Games. There were 10 events in total (four more than in 2020).

== Medal table ==
* Host nation (France)

Rank	NPC	Gold	Silver	Bronze	Total
1	Great Britain	2	0	0	2
2	Turkey	1	3	1	5
3	Uzbekistan	1	2	0	3
4	Mongolia	1	1	0	2
5	Azerbaijan	1	0	1	2
5	Brazil	1	0	1	2
7	China	1	0	0	1
7	Israel	1	0	0	1
7	Peru	1	0	0	1
10	Iran	0	1	2	3
11	Mexico	0	1	1	2
12	France*	0	1	0	1
–	Neutral Paralympic Athletes	0	1	0	1
13	Greece	0	0	2	2
13	Morocco	0	0	2	2
15	Argentina	0	0	1	1
15	Chinese Taipei	0	0	1	1
15	Denmark	0	0	1	1
15	Georgia	0	0	1	1
15	Italy	0	0	1	1
15	Nepal	0	0	1	1
15	Refugee Paralympic Team	0	0	1	1
15	South Korea	0	0	1	1
15	Thailand	0	0	1	1
15	United States	0	0	1	1
Totals (24 entries)		10	10	20	40

== Medal summary ==
=== Men ===
Event	Gold	Silver	Bronze
58 kg	Asaf Yasur; Israel	Ali Can Özcan; Turkey	Sabir Zeynalov; Azerbaijan
58 kg	Asaf Yasur; Israel	Ali Can Özcan; Turkey	Xiao Xiang-wen; Chinese Taipei
63 kg	Mahmut Bozteke; Turkey	Ganbatyn Bolor-Erdene; Mongolia	Antonino Bossolo; Italy
63 kg	Mahmut Bozteke; Turkey	Ganbatyn Bolor-Erdene; Mongolia	Ayoub Adouich; Morocco
70 kg	Imamaddin Khalilov; Azerbaijan	Fatih Çelik; Turkey	Juan Diego García López; Mexico
70 kg	Imamaddin Khalilov; Azerbaijan	Fatih Çelik; Turkey	Juan Samorano; Argentina
80 kg	Asadbek Toshtemirov; Uzbekistan	Luis Mario Nájera; Mexico	Alireza Bakht; Iran
80 kg	Asadbek Toshtemirov; Uzbekistan	Luis Mario Nájera; Mexico	Joo Jeong-hun; South Korea
+80 kg	Matt Bush; Great Britain	Aliaskhab Ramazanov; Neutral Paralympic Athletes	Evan Medell; United States
+80 kg	Matt Bush; Great Britain	Aliaskhab Ramazanov; Neutral Paralympic Athletes	Hamed Haghshenas; Iran

=== Women ===
Event	Gold	Silver	Bronze
47 kg	Leonor Espinoza; Peru	Ziyodakhon Isakova; Uzbekistan	Khwansuda Phuangkitcha; Thailand
47 kg	Leonor Espinoza; Peru	Ziyodakhon Isakova; Uzbekistan	Zakia Khudadadi; Refugee Paralympic Team
52 kg	Surenjav Ulambayar; Mongolia	Zahra Rahimi; Iran	Ana Japaridze; Georgia
52 kg	Surenjav Ulambayar; Mongolia	Zahra Rahimi; Iran	Meryem Betül Çavdar; Turkey
57 kg	Li Yujie; China	Gamze Gürdal; Turkey	Palesha Goverdhan; Nepal
57 kg	Li Yujie; China	Gamze Gürdal; Turkey	Silvana Fernandes; Brazil
65 kg	Ana Carolina Moura; Brazil	Djélika Diallo; France	Lisa Gjessing; Denmark
65 kg	Ana Carolina Moura; Brazil	Djélika Diallo; France	Christina Gkentzou; Greece
+65 kg	Amy Truesdale; Great Britain	Guljonoy Naimova; Uzbekistan	Eleni Papastamatopoulou; Greece
+65 kg	Amy Truesdale; Great Britain	Guljonoy Naimova; Uzbekistan	Rajae Akermach; Morocco

== Qualification ==
There were 10 events in total, 5 each for men and women. Each medal event had twelve athletes competing (120 overall).

Quotas could be obtained in four ways:

- World Ranking list (up to 60) :The six highest ranked athletes in each weight category on the World Para Taekwondo Paralympic Ranking list of January 2024 each obtained one qualification slot for their NPC, up to the maximum quota of one athlete per NPC per event. Any slots that could not be allocated under this method were allocated via the Bipartite Commission Invitation method
- Continental qualification (up to 50) : The highest ranked athlete in each medal event at each of the five Continental Qualification Tournaments obtained one qualification slot for their NPC. In each sex, only those NPCs that had not yet obtained three or more qualification slots through the allocation method above may have entered athletes in these Tournaments. The number of entries per NPC was limited to the number of slots remaining to reach the maximum quota of three qualification slots per sex. Any slots that could not be allocated under this method were allocated via the Bipartite Commission Invitation method.
- Host Quota (up to 5) : The host country, France, directly earned five slots, one in each of the five (5) medal events where France had the highest ranked athletes on the World Para Taekwondo Paralympic Ranking of January 2024, subject to at least two of the athletes being female. Should France have obtained any slots via the other allocation methods above, the respective reserved slots would have been allocated via the Bipartite Commission Invitation method.
- Bipartite Commission (5+) : A minimum of five eligible athletes were considered by the IPC and WT for Bipartite Commission Invitation slots, and athletes could have been selected by this method up to the total quota of 12 per medal event.

=== Men's events ===
==== 58 kg ====
Qualification	Country	Athlete
World Ranking	Israel	Asaf Yasur
World Ranking	Turkey	Alican Özcan
World Ranking	Azerbaijan	Sabir Zeynalov
World Ranking	Chinese Taipei	Xiao Xiang-wen
World Ranking	Japan	Mitsuya Tanaka
World Ranking	France	Bopha Kong
2024 African Qualification Tournament	Niger	Ide Oumarrou Djabirou
2024 European Qualification Tournament	Spain	Joel Martín Villalobos
2024 Asian Qualification Tournament	Thailand	Thanwa Kaenkham
2024 Oceanian Qualification Tournament	Solomon Islands	Solomon Jagiri
2024 Pan American Qualification Tournament	Argentina	Miguel Issac Galeano
Bipartite Commission	Afghanistan	Ebrahim Danishi

==== 63 kg ====
Qualification	Country	Athlete
World Ranking	Turkey	Mahmut Bozteke
World Ranking	Mongolia	Ganbatyn Bolor-Erdene
World Ranking	Italy	Antonino Bossolo
World Ranking	Brazil	Nathan Torquato
World Ranking	Iran	Saeid Sadeghianpour
World Ranking	Uzbekistan	Zukhriddin Tokhirov
2024 African Qualification Tournament	Morocco	Ayoub Adouich
2024 European Qualification Tournament	Israel	Adnan Milad
2024 Asian Qualification Tournament	South Korea	Lee Dong-ho
2024 Oceanian Qualification Tournament	Papua New Guinea	Kevin Baki
2024 Pan American Qualification Tournament	Dominican Republic	Geraldo Castro Encarnacion
Bipartite Commission		

==== 70 kg ====
Qualification	Country	Athlete
World Ranking	Azerbaijan	Imammadin Khalilov
World Ranking	Turkey	Fatih Çelik
World Ranking	Mexico	Juan Diego García López
World Ranking	Japan	Shunsuke Kudo
World Ranking	Iran	Mahdi Pourrahnama
World Ranking	Uzbekistan	Javokhir Alikulov
2024 African Qualification Tournament	Egypt	Abdel Rahman Mahmoud
2024 European Qualification Tournament	Georgia	Giorgi Nikoladze
2024 Asian Qualification Tournament	Thailand	Tanapan Sotthiset
2024 Oceanian Qualification Tournament	Papua New Guinea	Herea Loi
2024 Pan American Qualification Tournament	Cuba	Michel Suárez Walker
Bipartite Commission		

==== 80 kg ====
Qualification	Country	Athlete
World Ranking	Uzbekistan	Asadbek Toshtemirov
World Ranking	South Korea	Joo Jeong-hun
World Ranking	Iran	Alireza Bakht
World Ranking	Mexico	Luis Mario Nájera
World Ranking	Azerbaijan	Abulfaz Abuzarli
World Ranking	Kazakhstan	Nurlan Dombayev
2024 African Qualification Tournament	Morocco	Rachid Ismaili
2024 European Qualification Tournament	Serbia	Nikola Spajić
2024 Asian Qualification Tournament	Philippines	Allain Ganapin
2024 Oceanian Qualification Tournament	Solomon Islands	Raymond Pureke
2024 Pan American Qualification Tournament	Brazil	Claro Lopes
Bipartite Commission		

==== +80 kg ====
Qualification	Country	Athlete
World Ranking	Croatia	Ivan Mikulić
World Ranking	United States	Evan Medell
World Ranking	Iran	Hamed Haghshenas
World Ranking	Turkey	Mehmet Sami Saraç
World Ranking	Great Britain	Matt Bush
World Ranking	Kazakhstan	Nyshan Omirali
2024 African Qualification Tournament	Senegal	Idrissa Keita
2024 European Qualification Tournament	Neutral Paralympic Athletes	Aliskhab Ramazanov
2024 Asian Qualification Tournament	China	Liu Ludong
2024 Oceanian Qualification Tournament	Solomon Islands	James Ingram Gegeu
2024 Pan American Qualification Tournament	Dominican Republic	Julio Figuereo
Bipartite Commission		

=== Women's events ===
==== 47 kg ====
Qualification	Country	Athlete
World Ranking	Mexico	Claudia Romero
World Ranking	Uzbekistan	Ziyodakhon Iskova
World Ranking	Peru	Leonor Espinoza
World Ranking	Iran	Maryam Abdollahpour Deroei
World Ranking	Thailand	Khwansuda Phuangkitcha
World Ranking	Turkey	Nurcihan Ekinci
2024 African Qualification Tournament	Cameroon	Guileine Chemogne
2024 European Qualification Tournament	Refugee Paralympic Team	Zakia Khudadadi
2024 Asian Qualification Tournament	India	Aruna Tanwar
2024 Oceanian Qualification Tournament	—N/a	
2024 Pan American Qualification Tournament	Cuba	Lilisbet Rodriguez Rivero
Bipartite Commission		

==== 52 kg ====
Qualification	Country	Athlete
World Ranking	Turkey	Meryem Betül Çavdar
World Ranking	Mexico	Jessica Garcia Quijano
World Ranking	Brazil	Maria Eduarda Machado Stumpf
World Ranking	Egypt	Salma Moneem Hassan
World Ranking	Mongolia	Surenjav Ulambayar
World Ranking	China	Shao Qian
2024 African Qualification Tournament	Kenya	Neema Stency Obonyo
2024 European Qualification Tournament	Georgia	Ana Japaridze
2024 Asian Qualification Tournament	Iran	Aylar Jami
2024 Oceanian Qualification Tournament	—N/a	
2024 Pan American Qualification Tournament	Dominican Republic	Elisabeth Geraldo
Bipartite Commission		

==== 57 kg ====
Qualification	Country	Athlete
World Ranking	Brazil	Silvana Fernandes
World Ranking	Turkey	Gamze Gürdal
World Ranking	Kazakhstan	Kamilya Dosmalova
World Ranking	China	Li Yujie
World Ranking	Serbia	Marija Mičev
World Ranking	France	Sophie Caverzan
2024 African Qualification Tournament	Kenya	Julieta Lemuge Moipo
2024 European Qualification Tournament	Ukraine	Yuliya Lypetska
2024 Asian Qualification Tournament	Nepal	Palesha Goverdhan
2024 Oceanian Qualification Tournament	Fiji	Irene Mar
2024 Pan American Qualification Tournament	Venezuela	Valeria Morales
Bipartite Commission		

==== 65 kg ====
Qualification	Country	Athlete
World Ranking	Great Britain	Beth Munro
World Ranking	Brazil	Ana Carolina Silva de Moura
World Ranking	Denmark	Lisa Gjessing
World Ranking	Turkey	Seçil Er
World Ranking	France	Djélika Diallo
World Ranking	Neutral Paralympic Athletes	Elena Savinskaya
2024 African Qualification Tournament	Cameroon	Marie Antoinette Dassi
2024 European Qualification Tournament	Poland	Patrycja Zewar
2024 Asian Qualification Tournament	China	Yao Yinan
2024 Oceanian Qualification Tournament	Solomon Islands	Junita Tonowane
2024 Pan American Qualification Tournament	Chile	Constanza Fuentes
Bipartite Commission		

==== +65 kg ====
Qualification	Country	Athlete
World Ranking	Uzbekistan	Guljonoy Naimova
World Ranking	Great Britain	Amy Truesdale
World Ranking	Spain	Dalia Santiago Moreno
World Ranking	Brazil	Débora Menezes
World Ranking	Mexico	Fernanda Vargas
World Ranking	Serbia	Jelena Rašić
2024 African Qualification Tournament	Morocco	Rajae Akermach
2024 European Qualification Tournament	Greece	Eleni Papastamatopoulou
2024 Asian Qualification Tournament	Thailand	Jiraporn Wongsuwan
2024 Oceanian Qualification Tournament	Papua New Guinea	Manega Tapari
2024 Pan American Qualification Tournament	Cuba	Lidia Montes de Oca
Bipartite Commission		

== See also ==
- Taekwondo at the 2024 Summer Olympics
