= Taekwondo at the 2024 Summer Paralympics – Women's 57 kg =

Taekwondo – Women's 57 kg K44 at the XVII Paralympic Games
- Venue: Grand Palais, Paris
- Date: 30 August 2024
- Competitors: 11 from 11 nations

Medalists
1st place, gold medalist(s)		Li Yujie	China
2nd place, silver medalist(s)		Gamze Gürdal	Turkey
3rd place, bronze medalist(s)		Palesha Goverdhan	Nepal
3rd place, bronze medalist(s)		Silvana Fernandes	Brazil

The women's 57 kg taekwondo competition at the 2024 Summer Paralympics was held on 30 August 2024 at the Grand Palais, Paris. 12 athletes took part.

In this weight class, as there are 11 players, a fifth player entered the competition at the quarterfinal stage.

== Results ==
Bracket

Round of 16
30 August, South Paris Arena
Valeria Morales (VEN)	0
Palesha Goverdhan (NEP)	31
30 August, South Paris Arena
Julieta Lemuge Moipo (KEN)	4
Marija Mičev (SRB)	19
30 August, South Paris Arena
Yuliya Lypetska (UKR)	3
Irene Mar (FIJ)	25

Quarter-finals
30 August, South Paris Arena
Palesha Goverdhan (NEP)	8
Silvana Fernandes (BRA)	10
30 August, South Paris Arena
Sophie Caverzan (FRA)	5
Li Yujie (CHN)	19
30 August, South Paris Arena
Marija Mičev (SRB)	5
Kamilya Dosmalova (KAZ)	0
30 August, South Paris Arena
Irene Mar (FIJ)	5
Gamze Gürdal (TUR)	29

Semi-finals
30 August, South Paris Arena
Silvana Fernandes (BRA)	13
Li Yujie (CHN)	17
30 August, South Paris Arena
Marija Mičev (SRB)	1
Gamze Gürdal (TUR)	14

Gold medal match
30 August, South Paris Arena
Li Yujie (CHN)	11
Gamze Gürdal (TUR)	0

Repechage

Repechage match
30 August, South Paris Arena
Palesha Goverdhan (NEP)	2
Sophie Caverzan (FRA)	1

Bronze medal match
30 August, South Paris Arena
Palesha Goverdhan (NEP)	15
Marija Mičev (SRB)	8

Repechage match
30 August, South Paris Arena
Kamilya Dosmalova (KAZ)	12
Irene Mar (FIJ)	6

Bronze medal match
30 August, South Paris Arena
Kamilya Dosmalova (KAZ)	2
Silvana Fernandes (BRA)	28
