= Palesha Goverdhan =

Nepalese parataekwondo practitioner (born 2003)

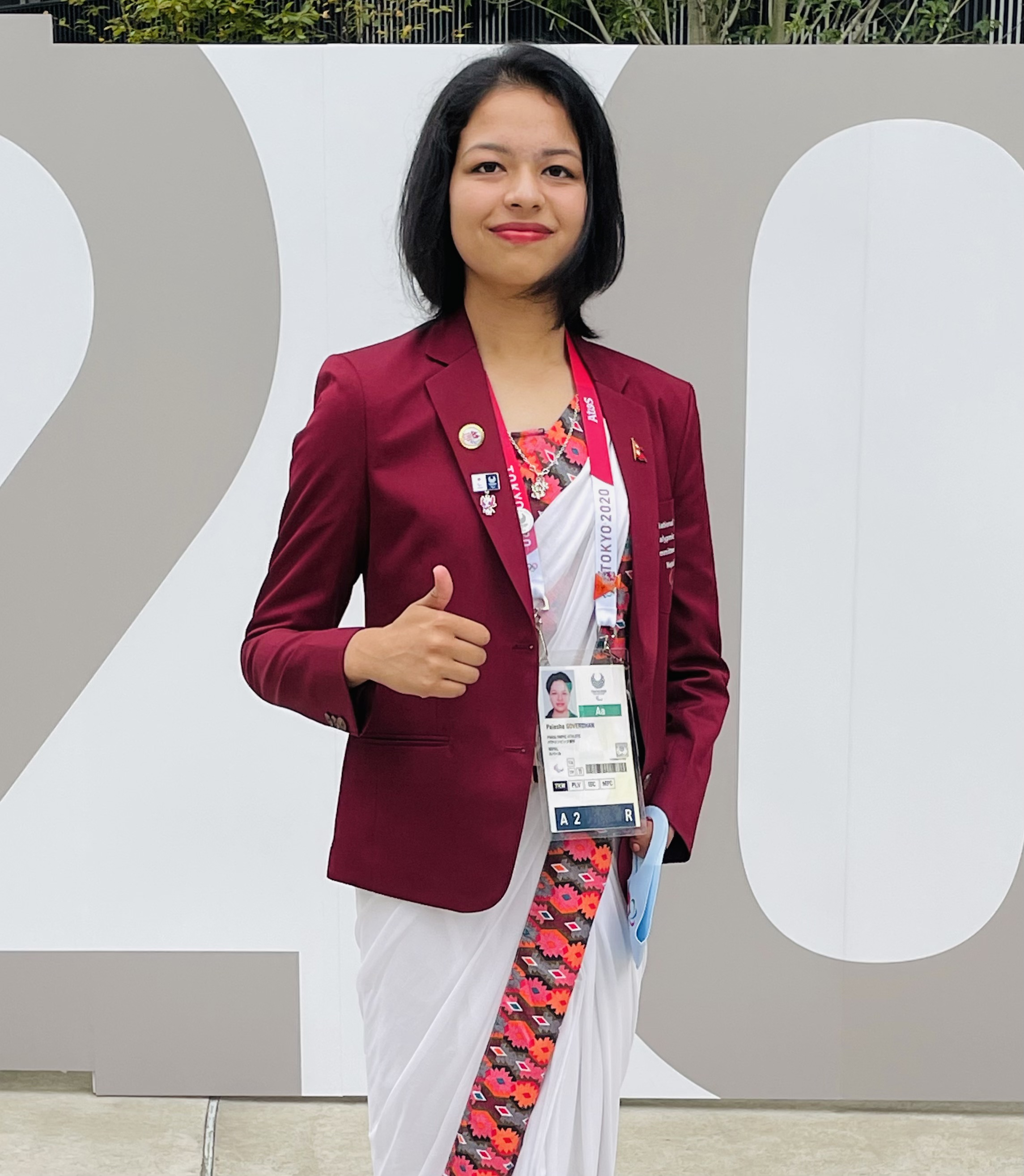
- Goverdhan in 2021

Personal information
- Native name: पलेशा गोवर्धन
- Full name: Palesha Goverdhan
- Nationality: Nepalese
- Born: 25 July 2003 (age 23) Kathmandu, Nepal
- Education: Tongji University, Shanghai, China
- Height: 5 ft 7 in (170 cm)
- Weight: 57 kg (126 lb)

Sport
- Country: Nepal
- Sport: Para Taekwondo
- Disability: Congenital limb deficiency
- Disability class: K44
- Turned pro: 2016
- Coached by: Kabiraj Negi Lama
Medal record
Women's para taekwondo
Representing Nepal
Paralympics
Bronze medal – third place	2024 Paris	57 kg
Asian Para Taekwondo Championship
Bronze medal – third place	2018 Vietnam	58 kg
Bronze medal – third place	2025 Kuching	57 kg
Bronze medal – third place	2026 Ulaanbaatar	57 kg
Asian Para Games
Bronze medal – third place	2022 Hangzhou	57 kg
Asian Youth Para Games
Gold medal – first place	2021 Manama	57 kg
Asian Taekwondo Paralympic Qualification Tournament
Gold medal – first place	2024 Tai'an	57 kg
U.S. Open Taekwondo Championships-Para Taekwondo
Bronze medal – third place	2026 Las Vegas	57 kg

Palesha Goverdhan (Nepali: पलेशा गोवर्धन, born 25 July 2003) is a Nepali parataekwondo practitioner. In 2021, she competed at the 2020 Summer Paralympics in the 58 kg category. Three years later, Goverdhan competed at the 2024 Summer Paralympics (57 kg Category) and won a bronze medal, becoming the first Nepalese athlete to win a medal at the Paralympics.

== Personal life ==
Palesha Goverdhan was born to Pradeep Goverdhan and Manita Goverdhan (née Shrestha) in Bagbazar, Kathmandu. She was born without a left palm. She has been training with her coach, Kabiraj Negi Lama, in the Nepal Taekwondo Association since 2016.

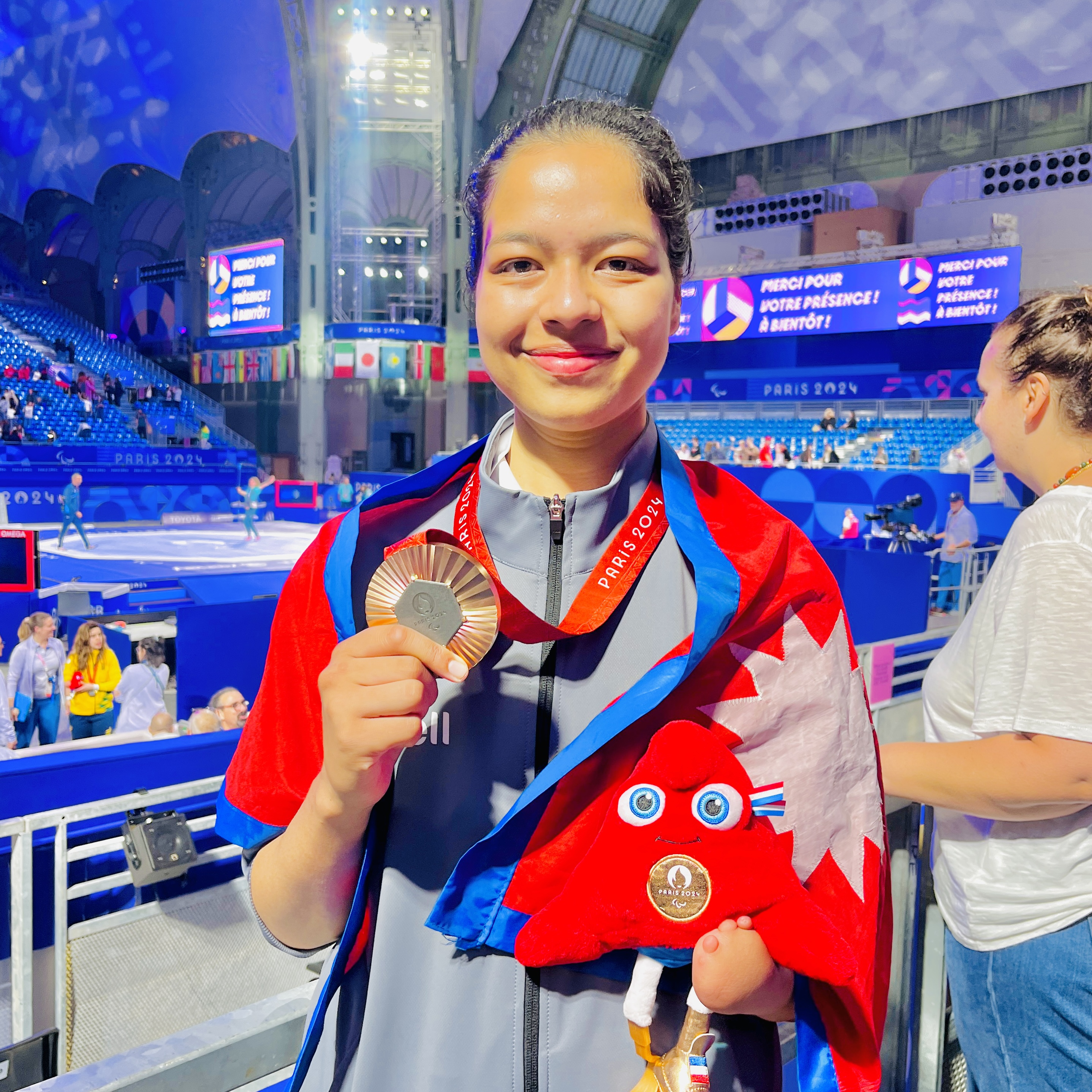
Palesha Goverdhan wins a bronze medal for Nepal at the Paris 2024 Paralympics, held at the Grand Palais in Paris.

== Career ==
Goverdhan won the bronze medal in the Asian Para Taekwondo Championship held in 2018 in Vietnam.

Goverdhan participated at the 2020 Summer Paralympics in Tokyo, Japan. She lost 21–8 to Great Britain's Beth Munro, the eventual silver medalist. Goverdhan won repechage matches against Brianna Salinaro of the USA and Marija Mičev of Serbia, but lost to China's Li Yujie. In doing so, she became the first Nepali athlete to win two fights at the Summer Paralympics. Later that year, Gobardhan won the first gold medal for Nepal in para-Taekwondo by defeating Ebrahimi Roza from Iran in the final of the 2021 Asian Youth Para Games.

Govardhan won bronze medal in 2022 Asian Para Games held in Hangzhou, China, becoming the first Nepali para-athlete to win a medal in the Asian Para Games.

In March 2024, Goverdhan won gold in the women's 57 category the Asian section of the Pralympics qualification. In doing so, she qualified for the 2024 Summer Paralympics in Paris, France, becoming the first Nepalese to qualify via that route. In the 57 kg category of the games, Goverdhan won her first match against Valeria Morales of Venezuela with a score of 31–0. She then lost to Silvana Fernandes of Brazil in a close match, with a score of 8–10. Afterward, Goverdhan competed in the Repechage round for a bronze medal. She won her first Repechage match against Sophie Caverzan of France with a score of 2–1. In the Repechage final, she defeated Marija Mičev of Serbia with a score of 15–8. This won her a bronze medal and she became Nepal's first-ever Paralympic medalist. For this achievement, she was awarded रू65 lakh (equivalent to ₹0.00 or US$0.00 in 2026) by the Nepalese prime minister KP Oli on behalf of the Government of Nepal.

Palesha Goverdhan won a bronze medal for Nepal at the 10th Asian Para Taekwondo Championships (G4) held in Kuching, Malaysia, on July 1, 2025.

She won a bronze medal at the U.S. Open Taekwondo Championships in Para Taekwondo, held on 6 March 2026 in Las Vegas, United States.

Goverdhan won a bronze medal for Nepal at the 11th Asian Para Taekwondo Championships, held in Ulaanbaatar, Mongolia, on 25 May 2026.

== Honours and awards ==
S.N	Honors and Awards	By	Year
1.	15th NNIPA Sports Award 2077	Nepal National and International Players Association (NNIPA)	2021
2.	Best Player Award of the Year 2022	National Sports Council (Nepal)	2022
3.	Best Para Athlete of NSJF Bajaj Pulsar Sports Award 2078	Nepal Sports Journalists Forum (NSJF)	2023
4.	Vibhushit (जनसेवाश्री पञ्चम श्रेणीद्धारा विभूषित २०७७) on the occasion of the Constitution Day of the Government of Nepal 2079	Office of the President of Nepal (राष्ट्रपतिको कार्यालय), Right Honourable Mr. Ram Chandra Poudel	2023
5.	Best Taekwondo Athlete Award 2024	Nepal Taekwondo Association (NTA)	2024
6.	NOC Best Para Athlete Award 2024	Nepal Olympic Committee (NOC)	2024
7.	Best Para Athlete of NSJF Bajaj Pulsar Sports Award 2080	Nepal Sports Journalists Forum (NSJF)	2024
8.	Best Para Athlete Award of Bagmati Province Sports Awards 2082	Ministry of Youth and Sports Bagmati Province	2025
9.	Trailblazer Of The Year 2081 of NSJF Bajaj Pulsar Sports Award 2081	Nepal Sports Journalists Forum (NSJF)	2026
