= Denmark at the 2020 Summer Paralympics =

- Flag of Denmark
- IPC code: DEN
- NPC: Danish Paralympic Committee

in Tokyo, Japan 25 August 2020 – 6 September 2020
- Competitors: 22 in 7 sports
- Flag bearers: Daniel Wagner Jørgensen; Lisa Gjessing
- Medals: Gold 3 Silver 1 Bronze 1 Total 5

Summer Paralympics appearances (overview)
- 1968; 1972; 1976; 1980; 1984; 1988; 1992; 1996; 2000; 2004; 2008; 2012; 2016; 2020; 2024

Denmark competed at the 2020 Summer Paralympics in Tokyo from 25 August to 6 September.

== Medalists ==
Medal	Name	Sport	Event	Date
Gold	Tobias Thorning Jorgensen	Equestrian	Individual championship test grade III	27 August
Gold	Tobias Thorning Jorgensen	Equestrian	Individual freestyle test grade III	30 August
Gold	Lisa Gjessing	Taekwondo	Women's 58 kg	3 September
Silver	Peter Rosenmeier	Table tennis	Men's individual class 6	28 August
Bronze	Daniel Wagner	Athletics	Men's long jump T63	28 August

== Athletics ==
Two athletes have qualified to compete.

Men's track

Athlete	Event	Heats		Final	
Athlete	Event	Result	Rank	Result	Rank
Christian Lykkeby Olsen	1500m T46	—		4:00.16	7
Daniel Wagner	100m T63	12.61	2 Q	12.37 =SB	4

Men's field

Athlete	Event	Final	
Athlete	Event	Result	Rank
Daniel Wagner	Long jump T63	7.07	3rd place, bronze medalist(s)

Women's field

Athlete	Event	Final	
Athlete	Event	Result	Rank
Bjørk Nørremark	Long jump F64	4.77	11
Kristel Walther	Discus throw F64	34.16 PB	6

== Badminton ==
Athlete	Event	Group stage			Quarterfinal	Semifinal	Final / BM	
Athlete	Event	Opposition Score	Opposition Score	Rank	Opposition Score	Opposition Score	Opposition Score	Rank
Cathrine Rosengren	Women's singles SU5	Sugino (JPN); L (21–15, 13–21, 15–21)	Kameyama (JPN); L (20–22, 13–21)	3	did not advance			

== Cycling ==
Denmark have secured quotas in cycling.

=== Road ===
Athlete	Event	Result	Rank
Kim Christiansen	Men's time trial H4	45:19.19	10
Kim Christiansen	Men's road race H4	-1 Lap	9

== Equestrian ==
Denmark sent four athletes after they qualified.

== Swimming ==
Denmark have qualified one swimmer to compete at the 2020 Summer Paralympics.

Women

Athlete	Event	Heats		Final	
Athlete	Event	Result	Rank	Result	Rank
Amalie Vinther	Women's 50m freestyle S8	35.16	12	did not advance	
Amalie Vinther	Women's 400m freestyle S8	—		5:22.44	7
Amalie Vinther	Women's 100m breaststroke SB7	1:48.79	8 Q	1:47.84	8
Amalie Vinther	Women's 200m individual medley SM8	3:12.70	8 Q	3:11.29	7

== Table tennis ==
Denmark entered one athletes into the table tennis competition at the games. Peter Rosenmeier qualified from 2019 ITTF European Para Championships which was held in Helsingborg, Sweden.

Men

Athlete	Event	Group Stage			Quarterfinals	Semifinals	Final	
Athlete	Event	Opposition Result	Opposition Result	Rank	Opposition Result	Opposition Result	Opposition Result	Rank
Peter Rosenmeier	Individual C6	Seidenfeld (USA); W 3-2 (9-11, 7-11, 9-11, 11,8)	Parenzan (ITA); W 3-0 (14,12, 11-6, 11-7)	1 Q	Chen (CHN); W 3-1 (11-6, 8-11, 11-8, 11-8)	Thainiyom (THA); W 3-1 (11-8, 11-7, 11-13, 11-5)	Seidenfeld (USA); L 0-3 (9-11, 9-11, 8-11)	2nd place, silver medalist(s)

== Taekwondo ==
Denmark qualified one athletes to compete at the Paralympics competition. Lisa Gjessing will compete after placing first in world ranking, to booked one of six available quotas.

Athlete	Event	First round	Quarterfinals	Semifinals	Final
Athlete	Event	Opposition Result	Opposition Result	Opposition Result	Rank
Lisa Gjessing	Women's –58 kg	Abohegazy (EGY); W (14-3)	Fernandes (BRA); W (8-6)	Munro (GBR); W (32-14)	1st place, gold medalist(s)

== Wheelchair rugby ==
Denmark national wheelchair rugby team qualified for the Games for the first time by finishing top two at the 2019 European Championship Division A in Vejle.

Team roster

- Team event – 1 team of 12 players

Squad	Group stage				Semifinal	Final	Rank
Squad	Opposition Result	Opposition Result	Opposition Result	Rank	Opposition Result	Opposition Result	Rank
Denmark national team	Australia; W 54-53	Japan; L 51-60	France; L 50-52	4	Did not advance	7th place match: New Zealand; W 56-53	7

Group stage

Pos	Team	Pld	W	D	L	GF	GA	GD	Pts	Qualification
1	Japan (H)	3	3	0	0	170	155	+15	6	Semi-finals
2	Australia	3	1	0	2	156	159	−3	2	Semi-finals
3	France	3	1	0	2	151	153	−2	2	Fifth place Match
4	Denmark	3	1	0	2	155	165	−10	2	Seventh place Match

Source: Tokyo2020
(H) Hosts
25 August 2020
12:45

Australia	53–54	Denmark

Yoyogi National Stadium, Tokyo

26 August 2021
12:45

Japan	60–51	Denmark

Yoyogi National Stadium, Tokyo

27 August 2021
12:45

France	52–50	Denmark

Yoyogi National Stadium, Tokyo

Seventh place match

28 August 2021
11:30

Denmark	56–53	New Zealand

Yoyogi National Stadium, Tokyo

== See also ==
- Denmark at the Paralympics
- Denmark at the 2020 Summer Olympics
