= Iran at the 2026 Asian Para Games =

- IPC code: IRN
- NPC: I. R. Iran National Paralympic Committee
- Website: www.paralympic.ir (in Persian and English)

18–24 October 2026
- Competitors: 162 in 15 sports
- Flag bearers: Rouhollah Rostami & Somayeh Rahimi
- Medals Ranked 6th: Gold 26 Silver 36 Bronze 40 Total 102

Asian Para Games appearances (overview)
- 2010; 2014; 2018; 2022; 2026

Youth appearances
- 2009; 2013; 2017; 2021; 2025

Iran competed in the 2026 Asian Para Games officially the 5th Asian Para Games in Aichi Prefecture and Nagoya, Japan from 18 October to 24 October 2026.

== Competitors ==
Iran participated at the Games with 166 athletes (104 men and 62 women) in 15 sports. The following is the list of sports and numbers of athletes participating at the 2026 Asian Para Games.

Sport	Men	Women	Total
Para Archery	3	2	5
Para Athletics	24	19	43
Boccia	1	2	3
Para Cycling	2	0	2
Football 5-a-side	10	0	10
Goalball	6	0	6
Para Judo	6	0	6
Powerlifting	8	2	10
Shooting Para Sports	2	4	6
Sitting volleyball	12	12	24
Para Swimming	7	0	7
Para Table tennis	1	0	1
Para Taekwondo	6	7	13
Wheelchair basketball	12	12	24
Wheelchair fencing	1	1	2
Total	101	61	162

== Medal summary ==
=== Medalists ===
Medal	Name	Sport	Event	Date
Gold	Elham Salehi	Para Athletics	Women's Javelin Throw F52/F53/F54	19 October
Gold	Sina Zeyghaminejad	Para Swimming	Men's 100m Freestyle S10	19 October
Gold	Ailar Jami	Para Taekwondo	Women's K44 -47KG	19 October
Gold	Amirhossein Alipour	Para Athletics	Men's Shot Put F11	20 October
Gold	Saman Pakbaz	Para Athletics	Men's Shot Put F12	20 October
Gold	Mohammad Saber	Para Athletics	Men's Shot Put F33	20 October
Gold	Erfan Bondori	Para Athletics	Men's Javelin Throw F53/F54	20 October
Gold	Yasin Khosravi	Para Athletics	Men's Shot Put F56/F57	20 October
Gold	Faezeh Ahmadi	Para Shooting	P2 - Women's 10m Air Pistol SH1	20 October
Gold	Amirmohammad Haghighatshenas	Para Taekwondo	Men's K44 -70 KG	20 October
Gold	Alireza Zare	Para Athletics	Men's 100m T35	21 October
Gold	Ali Navaei	Para Judo	Men's J1 +95KG	21 October
Gold	Alireza Bakht	Para Taekwondo	Men's K44 -80 KG	21 October
Gold	Hamed Haghshenas	Para Taekwondo	Men's K44 +80 KG	21 October
Gold	Saeid Afrooz	Para Athletics	Men's Javelin Throw F33	22 October
Gold	Hajar Safarzadeh	Para Athletics	Women's 400m T12	22 October
Gold	Ahmad Aminzadeh	Powerlifting	Men's +107KG	22 October
Gold	Sina Zeyghaminejad	Para Swimming	Men's 50m Freestyle S10	22 October
Gold	Sina Zeyghaminejad	Para Swimming	Men's 100m Breaststroke SB9	22 October
Gold	Mahdi Olad	Para Athletics	Men's Discus Throw F11	23 October
Gold	Mehran Nikoee Majd	Para Athletics	Men's Shot Put F34	23 October
Gold	Elham Salehi	Para Athletics	Women's Shot Put F53/F54	23 October
Gold	Alireza Zare	Para Athletics	Men's 200m T35	23 October
Gold	Sadegh Beit	Para Athletics	Men's Javelin Throw F40/F41	23 October
Gold	Iran men's national sitting volleyball team: Vahid Baylari; Morteza Mehrzad; Meisam Alipour; Parsa Mohammadi; Meisam Hajibabaei; Amirreza Mirzaei; Sadegh Bigdeli; Rasoul Asadimehr; Hossein Golestani; Hossein Derikvand; Mohammad Nemati; Mahdi Babadi	Sitting volleyball	Men's Team	23 October
Gold	Abolfazl Zarif	Para Swimming	Men's 100m Backstroke S9	23 October
Silver	Parastoo Habibi	Para Athletics	Women's Club Throw F32	19 October
Silver	Masoumeh Tourani	Para Athletics	Women's Javelin Throw F52/F53/F54	19 October
Silver	Shahin Izadyar	Para Swimming	Men's 100m Freestyle S10	19 October
Silver	Ali Olfatnia	Para Athletics	Men's Long Jump T37/T38	20 October
Silver	Mahdi Olad	Para Athletics	Men's Shot Put F11	20 October
Silver	Atena Mohammadiha	Para Athletics	Women's Shot Put F33	20 October
Silver	Hajar Safarzadeh	Para Athletics	Women's 200m T12	20 October
Silver	Zeinab Moradi	Para Athletics	Women's Javelin Throw F55/56	20 October
Silver	Behrooz Farzad	Para Cycling	Men's C4 4000m Individual Pursuit	20 October
Silver	Sareh Javanmardi	Para Shooting	P2 - Women's 10m Air Pistol SH1	20 October
Silver	Abolfazl Zarif	Para Swimming	Men's 50m Freestyle S9	20 October
Silver	Zahra Rahimi	Para Taekwondo	Women's K44 -57 KG	20 October
Silver	Alireza Hemami	Para Athletics	Men's Shot Put F53	21 October
Silver	Hajar Safarzadeh	Para Athletics	Women's 100m T12	21 October
Silver	Zafar Zaker	Para Athletics	Men's Javelin Throw F55	21 October
Silver	Fatemehzahra Amiryousefi	Para Athletics	Women's 100m T13	21 October
Silver	Mohammadreza Khairollahzadeh	Para Judo	Men's J2 +95KG	21 October
Silver	Rouhollah Rostami	Powerlifting	Men's 88KG	21 October
Silver	Amirmohammad Barani	Para Archery	Men's Para Compound	22 October
Silver	Mohammad Ebrahim	Para Athletics	Men's Javelin Throw F33	22 October
Silver	Zafar Zaker	Para Athletics	Men's Shot Put F54/F55	22 October
Silver	Parastoo Habibi	Para Athletics	Women's Shot Put F32	22 October
Silver	Shahla Hadidi	Para Athletics	Women's Discus Throw F54	22 October
Silver	Aliakbar Gharibshahi	Powerlifting	Men's 107KG	22 October
Silver	Mahdi Sayadi	Powerlifting	Men's +107KG	22 October
Silver	Zahra Aghaei	Powerlifting	Women's 79KG	22 October
Silver	Nikoo Rozbahani	Powerlifting	Women's +86KG	22 October
Silver	Shahin Izadyar	Para Swimming	Men's 50m Freestyle S10	22 October
Silver	Shahin Izadyar	Para Swimming	Men's 100m Breaststroke SB9	22 October
Silver	Hassan Bajoulvand	Para Athletics	Men's Discus Throw F11	23 October
Silver	Mohammadtaha Beygrezaei	Para Athletics	Men's Shot Put F34	23 October
Silver	Hormoz Seidi	Para Athletics	Men's Javelin Throw F37	23 October
Silver	Hanan Kaab Omeir	Para Athletics	Women's Discus Throw F51/F52/F53	23 October
Silver	Shahla Hadidi	Para Athletics	Women's Shot Put F53/F54	23 October
Silver	Iran Women's national sitting volleyball team: Sepideh Jamaldoust; Maryam Nazeri; Farzaneh Heidari; Batoul Khalilzadeh; Mehri Fallahi; Fatemeh Abbasi; Zeynab Maleki; Maryam Kalhori; Neda Panjehbashi; Fatemeh Jahani; Hadis Rezaei; Zahra Nejati	Siiting volleyball	Women's Team	23 October
Silver	Iran men's national wheelchair basketball team: Mahdi Abbasi; Morteza Abedi; Amirreza Ahmadi; Mohammadtaha Yarmohammadi; Omid Hadizhar; Vahid Gholamazad; Abdoljalil Gharanjik; Mohammad Mohammadnezhad; Mohammadhassan Sayari; Erfan Bakhshandeh; Reza Niksirat; Abolfazl Jalaei	Wheelchair basketball	Men's Team	23 October
Bronze	Farzaneh Sohrabitabar	Para Athletics	Women's Club Throw F32	19 October
Bronze	Mohammadtaha Hassanpour	Para Taekwondo	Men's K44 -58KG	19 October
Bronze	Reza Hatami	Para Athletics	Men's 100m T38	20 October
Bronze	Hashemiyeh Motaghian	Para Athletics	Women's Javelin Throw F55/56	20 October
Bronze	Alireza Hemami	Para Athletics	Men's Discus Throw F51/F52/F53	20 October
Bronze	Mohammad Dalir	Para Cycling	Men's B 1000m Time Trial	20 October
Bronze	Mahdi Borchlou	Para Judo	Men's J1 -81KG	20 October
Bronze	Mousa Gholami	Para Judo	Men's J1 -95KG	20 October
Bronze	Mohsen Bakhtiar	Powerlifting	Men's 72KG	20 October
Bronze	Ali Motallebi	Para Swimming	Men's 50m Freestyle S9	20 October
Bronze	Sina Zeyghaminejad	Para Swimming	Men's 200m Individual Medley SM10	20 October
Bronze	Mohammadhossein Karimi	Para Swimming	Men's 100m Breaststroke SB13	20 October
Bronze	Hassan Janfeshan	Para Table tennis	Men's Singles - Class 2	20 October
Bronze	Saeid Sadeghianpour	Para Taekwondo	Men's K44 -63KG	20 October
Bronze	Maryam Abdollahpour	Para Taekwondo	Women's K44 -57KG	20 October
Bronze	Parimah Tourani	Para Taekwondo	Women's K44 -65KG	20 October
Bronze	Faezeh Dibaei	Para Athletics	Women's Discus Throw F56/F57	21 October
Bronze	Kosar Gharaei	Para Athletics	Women's Discus Throw F11	21 October
Bronze	Sadegh Beit	Para Athletics	Men's Shot Put F41	21 October
Bronze	Reza Hatami	Para Athletics	Men's 400m T35/T38	21 October
Bronze	Hashem Rastegari	Para Athletics	Men's 400m T37	21 October
Bronze	Amirhossein Nimrouzi	Para Judo	Men's J2 +95KG	21 October
Bronze	Aliasghar Abareghi	Powerlifting	Men's 97KG	21 October
Bronze	Ali Rashidabadi	Para Swimming	Men's 100m Breaststroke SB5	21 October
Bronze	Mahdi Pourrahnama	Para Taekwondo	Men's K44 -80KG	21 October
Bronze	Marzieh Nasrollahi	Para Taekwondo	Women's K44 +65KG	21 October
Bronze	Hamed Amiri	Para Athletics	Men's Shot Put F54/F55	22 October
Bronze	Amanolah Papi	Para Athletics	Men's Javelin Throw F56/F57	22 October
Bronze	Hamid Eslami	Para Athletics	Men's 1500m T11	22 October
Bronze	Leila Kabgzab	Para Athletics	Women's Shot Put F42/F44/F62/F64	22 October
Bronze	Nasrin Shahi	Para Shooting	Open 50m Pistol SH1	22 October
Bronze	Shahin Izadyar	Para Swimming	Men's 400m Freestyle S10	22 October
Bronze	Mohadeseh Babahabib; Somayeh Rahimi; Gholamreza Rahimi	Para Archery	Para Recurve Mixed Team	23 October
Bronze	Amirhossein Alipour	Para Athletics	Men's Discus Throw F11	23 October
Bronze	Fatemeh Amirzadegani	Para Athletics	Women's Long Jump T12	23 October
Bronze	Farzaneh Sohrabitabar	Para Athletics	Women's Discus Throw F51/F52/F53	23 October
Bronze	Iran men's national Blind Football team: Mohammadamin Rahimzadeh; Mohammad Mirzaei; Morteza Karimi; Alireza Bakht; Sadegh Rahimi; Ahmadreza Shahhosseini; Mohammad Aghajani; Hossein Rajabpour; Behzad Zadaliasghari; Reza Sadri	Football 5-a-side	Men's Team	23 October
Bronze	Malekoladi	Para Swimming	Men's 100m Backstroke S9	23 October
Bronze	Abolfazl Zarif	Para Swimming	Men's 100m Freestyle S9	23 October
Bronze	Mohammadhossein Karimi	Para Swimming	Men's 100m Butterfly S12	23 October

Medals by sport
Sport	1st place, gold medalist(s)	2nd place, silver medalist(s)	3rd place, bronze medalist(s)	Total
Para Athletics	14	20	16	50
Para Swimming	4	4	8	16
Para Taekwondo	4	1	6	11
Powerlifting	1	5	2	8
Para Judo	1	1	3	5
Para Shooting	1	1	1	3
Sitting Volleyball	1	1	0	2
Para Cycling	0	1	1	2
Para Archery	0	1	1	2
Football 5-a-side	0	0	1	1
Para Table Tennis	0	0	1	1
Wheelchair Basketball	0	0	1	1
Total	26	36	40	102

Medals by date
Day	Date	1st place, gold medalist(s)	2nd place, silver medalist(s)	3rd place, bronze medalist(s)	Total
Day 1	19 October	3	3	2	8
Day 2	20 October	7	9	14	30
Day 3	21 October	4	6	10	20
Day 4	22 October	5	11	6	22
Day 5	23 October	7	7	8	22
Day 6	24 October	0	0	0	0
Total		26	36	40	102

Medals by gender
Gender	1st place, gold medalist(s)	2nd place, silver medalist(s)	3rd place, bronze medalist(s)	Total	Percentage
Male	21	20	28	69	68%
Female	5	16	11	32	31%
Mixed	0	0	1	1	1%
Total	26	36	40	102	100%

=== Multiple medalists ===
Multiple medalists
Name	Sport	Gold	Silver	Bronze	Total
Sina Zeyghaminejad	Para Swimming	3	0	1	4
Alireza Zare	Para Athletics	2	0	0	2
Elham Salehi	Para Athletics	2	0	0	2
Hajar Safarzadeh	Para Athletics	1	2	0	3
Abolfazl Zarif	Para Swimming	1	1	1	3
Mahdi Olad	Para Athletics	1	1	0	2
Amirhossein Alipour	Para Athletics	1	0	1	2
Sadegh Beit	Para Athletics	1	0	1	2
Shahin Izadyar	Para Swimming	0	3	1	4
Zafar Zaker	Para Athletics	0	2	0	2
Shahla Hadidi	Para Athletics	0	2	0	2
Alireza Hemami	Para Athletics	0	1	1	2
Reza Hatami	Para Athletics	0	0	2	2
Farzaneh Sohrabitabar	Para Athletics	0	0	2	2
Mohammadhossein Karimi	Para Swimming	0	0	2	2

== Para Archery ==
Men

Athlete	Event	Ranking Round		Round of 32	Round of 16	Quarterfinals	Semifinals	Finals	
Athlete	Event	Score	Rank	Opposition Score	Opposition Score	Opposition Score	Opposition Score	Opposition Score	Rank
Hadi Nori	Para Compound Men	679	12	Anak Julin (MAS); W 143–134	Barani (IRI); L 140–143	Did not advance			—
Amirmohammad Barani	Para Compound Men	691	5	Bye	Nori (IRI); W 143–140	Swagumilang (INA); W 149–144	Zhang (CHN); W 147–145	Ai (CHN); L 144–144	2nd place, silver medalist(s)
Hadi Nori; Amirmohammad Barani	Para Compound Double Men	1370	4	—N/a	Bye	Thailand; L 151–152	Did not advance		—
Gholamerza Rahimi	Para Recurve Men	635	4	Bye	Yun (CHN); L 1–7	Did not advance			—

Women

Athlete	Event	Ranking Round		Round of 16	Quarterfinals	Semifinals	Finals	
Athlete	Event	Score	Rank	Opposition Score	Opposition Score	Opposition Score	Opposition Score	Rank
Somayeh Rahimi	Para Recurve Women	613	4	Phullphol (THA); W 6–0	Zihan (CHN); L 0–6	Did not advance		—
Mohadeseh Babahabib	Para Recurve Women	535	10	Zihan (MGL); L 5–6	Did not advance			—
Somayeh Rahimi; Mohadeseh Babahabib	Para Recurve Double Women	1148	3	—N/a	Thailand; W 6–0	India; L 2–6	Mongolia; L 2–6	4

Mixed

Athlete	Event	Ranking Round		Quarterfinals	Semifinals	Finals	
Athlete	Event	Score	Rank	Opposition Score	Opposition Score	Opposition Score	Rank
Mohadeseh Babahabib; Somayeh Rahimi; Gholamreza Rahimi	Para Recurve Mixed Team	1248	3	Japan; W 5–4	Indonesia; L 1–5	India; W 5–4	3rd place, bronze medalist(s)

== Para Athletics ==
Track & road events
Men

Athlete	Event	Heat		Final	
Athlete	Event	Result	Rank	Result	Rank
Vahid Alinajimi	Men's 100m T12	11.44 SB	2	Did not advance	
Vahid Alinajimi	Men's 400m T12	52.11	2 Q	51.40	4
Mehrdad Moradi	Men's 100m T13	11.37 SB	3 Q	13.96	8
Mehrdad Moradi	Men's 400m T13	DNF		Did not advance	
Alireza Zare	Men's 100m T35	—N/a		12.32 GR	1st place, gold medalist(s)
Alireza Zare	Men's 200m T35	—N/a		24.83	1st place, gold medalist(s)
Ali Olfatnia	Men's 100m T37	—N/a		12.36	6
Ali Olfatnia	Men's 200m T37	—N/a		25.02 SB	4
Hashem Rastegari	Men's 100m T37	—N/a		12.31	5
Hashem Rastegari	Men's 200m T37	—N/a		25.47	7
Hashem Rastegari	Men's 400m T37	—N/a		56.69	3rd place, bronze medalist(s)
Reza Hatami	Men's 100m T38	—N/a		11.72	3rd place, bronze medalist(s)
Reza Hatami	Men's 400m T35/T38	—N/a		51.81	3rd place, bronze medalist(s)
Hamid Eslami	Men's 1500m T11	4:45.74	2 Q	4:24.14	3rd place, bronze medalist(s)

Women

Athlete	Event	Heat		Final	
Athlete	Event	Result	Rank	Result	Rank
Fatemeh Amirzadegani	Women's 100m T12	13.14	2	Did not advance	
Hajar Safarzadeh	Women's 100m T12	12.25 PB	1 Q	12.30	2nd place, silver medalist(s)
Hajar Safarzadeh	Women's 200m T12	24.80	1 Q	25.02	2nd place, silver medalist(s)
Hajar Safarzadeh	Women's 400m T12	57.27	1 Q	56.43 GR	1st place, gold medalist(s)
Fatemehzahra Amiryousefi	Women's 100m T13	—N/a		13.03 PB	2nd place, silver medalist(s)
Fatemehzahra Amiryousefi	Women's 400m T13	—N/a		DQ	—
Zahra Sadatpour	Women's 1500m T12/T13	—N/a		DQ	—
Zahra Sadatpour	Women's 400m T12	1:06.90 PB	2	Did not advance	

Field events

Men

Athlete	Event	Qualification		Final	
Athlete	Event	Distance	Position	Distance	Position
Ali Olfatnia	Men's Long Jump T37/T38	—N/a		6.13 SB	2nd place, silver medalist(s)
Amirhossein Alipour	Men's Discus Throw F11	—N/a		36.54	3rd place, bronze medalist(s)
Amirhossein Alipour	Men's Shot Put F11	—N/a		14.99 AR	1st place, gold medalist(s)
Hassan Bajoulvand	Men's Discus Throw F11	—N/a		40.43	2nd place, silver medalist(s)
Hassan Bajoulvand	Men's Shot Put F11	—N/a		11.11	5
Mahdi Olad	Men's Discus Throw F11	—N/a		40.65	1st place, gold medalist(s)
Mahdi Olad	Men's Shot Put F11	—N/a		13.93	2nd place, silver medalist(s)
Alireza Hemami	Men's Discus Throw F51/F52/F53	—N/a		20.20	3rd place, bronze medalist(s)
Alireza Hemami	Men's Shot Put F53	—N/a		8.09	2nd place, silver medalist(s)
Hamed Amiri	Men's Discus Throw F54/F55/F56	—N/a		32.08	4
Hamed Amiri	Men's Shot Put F54/F55	—N/a		10.97	3rd place, bronze medalist(s)
Saman Pakbaz	Men's Shot Put F12	—N/a		13.52	1st place, gold medalist(s)
Mohammad Saber	Men's Shot Put F33	—N/a		10.95 GR	1st place, gold medalist(s)
Mohammad Saber	Men's Javelin Throw F33/F34	—N/a		DNS	—
Mohammadtaha Beygrezaei	Men's Shot Put F34	—N/a		11.61	2nd place, silver medalist(s)
Mehran Nikoeimajd	Men's Shot Put F34	—N/a		11.90	1st place, gold medalist(s)
Sadegh Beit Sayah	Men's Shot Put F41	—N/a		10.85	3rd place, bronze medalist(s)
Sadegh Beit Sayah	Men's Javelin Throw F40/F41	—N/a		45.78	1st place, gold medalist(s)
Erfan Bondori	Men's Shot Put F54/F55	—N/a		8.57	5
Erfan Bondori	Men's Javelin Throw F53/F54	—N/a		30.24 GR	1st place, gold medalist(s)
Zafar Zaker	Men's Shot Put F54/F55	—N/a		11.79 SB	2nd place, silver medalist(s)
Zafar Zaker	Men's Javelin Throw F55	—N/a		36.00 PB	2nd place, silver medalist(s)
Yasin Khosravi	Men's Shot Put F56/F57	—N/a		15.25 GR	1st place, gold medalist(s)
Saeid Afrooz	Men's Javelin Throw F33/F34	—N/a		42.58 WR	1st place, gold medalist(s)
Mohammad Ebrahim	Men's Javelin Throw F33/F34	—N/a		38.47	2nd place, silver medalist(s)
Hormoz Seidi	Men's Javelin Throw F37/F38	—N/a		50.68 PB	2nd place, silver medalist(s)
Amanolah Papi	Men's Javelin Throw F56/F57	—N/a		48.07	3rd place, bronze medalist(s)

Women

Athlete	Event	Qualification		Final	
Athlete	Event	Distance	Position	Distance	Position
Fatemeh Amirzadegani	Women's Long Jump T12	—N/a		5.13 PB	3rd place, bronze medalist(s)
Kosar Gharaei	Women's Discus Throw F11	—N/a		37.15	3rd place, bronze medalist(s)
Kosar Gharaei	Women's Shot Put F11/F12	—N/a		8.81 PB	4
Hanan Kaab Omeir	Women's Discus Throw F51/F52/F53	—N/a		10.36	2nd place, silver medalist(s)
Farzaneh Sohrabitabar	Women's Discus Throw F51/F52/F53	—N/a		10.93 AR	3rd place, bronze medalist(s)
Farzaneh Sohrabitabar	Women's Club Throw F32/F51	—N/a		23.20 AR	3rd place, bronze medalist(s)
Elnaz Darabian	Women's Discus Throw F54	—N/a		14.65	4
Elnaz Darabian	Women's Shot Put F53/F54	—N/a		4.60	4
Elnaz Darabian	Women's Javelin Throw F52/F53/F54	—N/a		10.15	6
Shahla Hadidi	Women's Discus Throw F54	—N/a		15.45 PB	2nd place, silver medalist(s)
Shahla Hadidi	Women's Shot Put F53/F54	—N/a		5.86	2nd place, silver medalist(s)
Faezeh Dibaei	Women's Discus Throw F56/F57	24.44 AR	1 Q	24.51 PB	3rd place, bronze medalist(s)
Vajiheh Houshmand	Women's Discus Throw F43/F44/F62/F64	—N/a		30.04 WR	4
Vajiheh Houshmand	Women's Shot Put F42/F44/F62/F64	—N/a		8.43	7
Leila Kabgzan	Women's Discus Throw F43/F44/F62/F64	—N/a		30.01 PB	5
Leila Kabgzan	Women's Shot Put F42/F44/F62/F64	—N/a		10.26	3rd place, bronze medalist(s)
Elham Salehi	Women's Shot Put F53/54	—N/a		6.79	1st place, gold medalist(s)
Elham Salehi	Women's Javelin Throw F52/F53/F54	—N/a		16.44	1st place, gold medalist(s)
Masoumeh Tourani	Women's Javelin Throw F52/F53/F54	—N/a		14.99	2nd place, silver medalist(s)
Parastoo Habibi	Women's Shot Put F32	—N/a		5.33	2nd place, silver medalist(s)
Parastoo Habibi	Women's Club Throw F32/F51	—N/a		23.32	2nd place, silver medalist(s)
Batul Jahangiri	Women's Shot Put F33	—N/a		6.44 PB	4
Atena Mohammadiha	Women's Shot Put F33	—N/a		6.85 PB	2nd place, silver medalist(s)
Atena Mohammadiha	Women's Javelin Throw F33/F34	—N/a		12.44	4
Zeinab Moradi	Women's Javelin Throw F55/F56	Bye		22.96 PB	2nd place, silver medalist(s)
Hashemiyeh Motaghian	Women's Javelin Throw F55/F56	Bye		22.94 SB	3rd place, bronze medalist(s)

== Boccia ==
Summary

Athlete	Event	Group Stage					Semifinals	Final / BM	
Athlete	Event	Opposition Score	Opposition Score	Opposition Score	Opposition Score	Rank	Opposition Score	Opposition Score	Rank
Hossein Esmaeilifazl	Men's Individual-BC4	Leung (HKG); L 10–3	Kwanphok (THA); L 0–9	Kim (KOR); L 0–10	Marjan (BRN); L 3–7	5	Did not advance		—
Neda Ghayebi	Women's Individual-BC1	Tan (SIN); W 8–1	Endo (JPN); W 5–2	Chanyadi (THA); W 7–2	Leung (HKG); W 4–2	1 Q	Handayani (INA); L 2–5	Tan (SIN); L 1–6	4
Maryam Malekifalah	Women's Individual-BC4	Cheung (HKG); L 1–6	Musraliyeva (KAZ); W 3–2	Lin (CHN); L 0–12	Phonsila (THA); L 3–4	4	Did not advance		—

== Para cycling ==
Men

Athlete	Event	Qualifying		Final	
Athlete	Event	Time	Rank	Time	Rank
Mohammad Dalir	Men's B 1000m Time Trial	1:04.220	6 Q	1:03.835	3rd place, bronze medalist(s)
Mohammad Dalir	Men's B 4000m Individual Pursuit	DNF	—	Did not advance	
Mohammad Dalir	Men's B Road Race	—N/a		DNF	—
Mohammad Dalir	Men's B Time Trial	—N/a		DNF	—
Behrooz Farzad	Men's C4-5 1000m Time Trial	1:13.857	11	Did not advance	
Behrooz Farzad	Men's C4 4000m Individual Pursuit	5:01.584	2 Q	OVL	2nd place, silver medalist(s)
Behrooz Farzad	Men's C4-5 Road Race	—N/a		-1LAP	11

== Football 5-a-side ==
Summary

Team	Event	Group Stage						Final / BM	
Team	Event	Opposition Score	Opposition Score	Opposition Score	Opposition Score	Opposition Score	Rank	Opposition Score	Rank
Iran men's	Men's tournament	Thailand; L 0–1	South Korea; W 3–1	China; W 2–0	India; W 5–0	Japan; L 1–2	3 QB	Thailand; W 2–1	3rd place, bronze medalist(s)

== Goalball ==
Summary

Team	Event	Group Stage						Semifinal	Final / BM	
Team	Event	Opposition Score	Opposition Score	Opposition Score	Opposition Score	Opposition Score	Opposition Score	Rank	Opposition Score	Rank
Iran Men's	Men's tournament	South Korea; L 3–5	Qatar; W 10–0	Thailand; W 12–9	China; L 5–9	Japan; L 2–9	4 Q	China; L 3–5	South Korea; L 4–6	4

== Para Judo ==
Men

Athlete	Event	Round of 16	Quarterfinals	Semifinals	Repechage		Finals / BM	
Athlete	Event	Opposition Score	Opposition Score	Opposition Score	Opposition Score	Opposition Score	Opposition Score	Rank
Mahdi Borchlou	Men's J1 -81 KG	Pacheco (PHI); W 100–0	Zheng (CHN); L 0–11	Did not advance	Lee (KOR); W 100–0	Kato (JPN); W 100–0s1	Arstanbekov (KAZ); W 100–0	3rd place, bronze medalist(s)
Mousa Gholami	Men's J1 -95 KG	Bye	Matsumoto (JPN); W 100–0	Matsumoto (UZB); L 11s1–101s1	Bye		Huseinov (TJK); W 100–0	3rd place, bronze medalist(s)
Ali Navaei	Men's J1 +95 KG	—N/a	Al-Sultani (IRQ); W 100–0	Utepov (KAZ); W 100–0	Bye		Tukhtabeov (UZB); W 101–0	1st place, gold medalist(s)
Reza Gholami	Men's J2 -81 KG	Bye	Kulmurza (KAZ); L 0s3–110s1	Did not advance	—N/a	Li (CHN); W 100–0	Smagululy (KAZ); L 0s1–101	5
Amirhossein Nimrouzi	Men's J2 +95 KG	—N/a	Huang (TPE); W 100–0s1	Shukurbekov (KAZ); L 0s3–101	Bye		Azhgaliyev (KAZ); W 100s2–0s2	3rd place, bronze medalist(s)
Mohammadreza Kheirollahzadeh	Men's J2 +95 KG	—N/a	Azhgaliyev (KAZ); W 100s2–0s2	Dadaev (UZB); W 100s1–0s1	Bye		Shukurbekov (KAZ); L 0s1–1	2nd place, silver medalist(s)

== Powerlifting ==
Men

Athlete	Event	Result	Rank
Alireza Izadi	Men's 59kg	180KG	5
Ali Seifi	Men's 65kg	173KG	5
Mohsen Bakhtiar	Men's 72kg	208KG	3rd place, bronze medalist(s)
Rouhollah Rostami	Men's 88kg	243KG	2nd place, silver medalist(s)
Aliasghar Abareghi	Men's 97kg	220KG	3rd place, bronze medalist(s)
Aliakbar Gharibshahi	Men's 107kg	245KG	2nd place, silver medalist(s)
Ahmad Aminzadeh	Men's +107kg	260KG	1st place, gold medalist(s)
Mahdi Sayadi	Men's +107kg	240KG	2nd place, silver medalist(s)
Mohsen Bakhtiar; Aliakbar Gharibshahi; Alireza Izadi	Men's Team	229.03	7

Women

Athlete	Event	Result	Rank
Zahra Aghaei	Women's 79kg	133KG	2nd place, silver medalist(s)
Nikoo Rozbahani	Women's +86kg	155KG	2nd place, silver medalist(s)

== Shooting Para Sports ==
Men

Athlete	Event	Qualification		Final	
Athlete	Event	Points	Rank	Points	Rank
Ali Galavi	P1 - Men's 10m Air Pistol SH1	566	6 Q	109.3	8
Seyedmohammadreza Mirshafiei	P1 - Men's 10m Air Pistol SH1	564	8 Q	192.6	4

Women

Athlete	Event	Qualification		Final	
Athlete	Event	Points	Rank	Points	Rank
Mahsa Haji Mohammadi	R2 - Women's 10m Air Rifle Standing SH1	615.8	11	Did not advance	
Faezeh Ahmadi	P2 - Women's 10m Air Pistol SH1	560	6 Q	237.3	1st place, gold medalist(s)
Sareh Javanmardi	P2 - Women's 10m Air Pistol SH1	559	7 Q	237.0	2nd place, silver medalist(s)
Nasrin Shahi	P2 - Women's 10m Air Pistol SH1	560	3 Q	191.5	4

Open

Athlete	Event	Qualification		Final	
Athlete	Event	Points	Rank	Points	Rank
Seyedmohammadreza Mirshafiei	P4 - Open 50m Pistol SH1	507	10	Did not advance	
Faezeh Ahmadi	P4 - Open 50m Pistol SH1	516	7 Q	119.9	7
Sareh Javanmardi	P4 - Open 50m Pistol SH1	529	2 Q	139.9	6
Nasrin Shahi	P4 - Open 50m Pistol SH1	535	1 Q	196.3	3rd place, bronze medalist(s)

== Sitting volleyball ==
Summary

Team	Event	Group Stage			Semifinals	Final / BM	
Team	Event	Opposition Score	Opposition Score	Rank	Opposition Score	Opposition Score	Rank
Iran men's	Men's tournament	Thailand; W 3–0	Kazakhstan; W 3–0	1 Q	China; W 3–0	Kazakhstan; W 3–0	1st place, gold medalist(s)
Iran women's	Women's tournament	China; L 0–3	Mongolia; W 3–0	2 Q	Japan; W 3–0	China; L 0–3	2nd place, silver medalist(s)

== Para Swimming ==
Men

Athlete	Events	Heats		Final	
Athlete	Events	Time	Rank	Time	Rank
Ali Rashidabadi	Men's 100m Backstroke S6	1:33.77	4	Did not advance	
Ali Rashidabadi	Men's 100m Breaststroke SB5	—N/a		1:47.78	3rd place, bronze medalist(s)
Ali Rashidabadi	Men's 200m Individual Medley SM6	—N/a		3:39.66	8
Abolfazl Malek Oladi	Men's 50m Freestyle S9	28.05	4 Q	28.13	8
Abolfazl Malek Oladi	Men's 100m Backstroke S9	1:08.24	2 Q	1:07.88	3rd place, bronze medalist(s)
Abolfazl Malek Oladi	Men's 100m Breaststroke SB8	—N/a		1:24.10	5
Abolfazl Malek Oladi	Men's 200m Individual Medley SM9	2:38.78	4 Q	2:41.11	7
Ali Motallebi	Men's 50m Freestyle S9	26.66	1 Q	26.18	3rd place, bronze medalist(s)
Ali Motallebi	Men's 100m Freestyle S9	1:055.88	5	Did not advance	
Ali Motallebi	Men's 100m Butterfly S9	1:05.02	2 Q	1:04.10	5
Ali Motallebi	Men's 200m Individual Medley SM9	2:34.01	4 Q	3:01.95	8
Abolfazl Zarif	Men's 50m Freestyle S9	25.99	1 Q	25.79	2nd place, silver medalist(s)
Abolfazl Zarif	Men's 100m Freestyle S9	1:00.53	3 Q	58.68	3rd place, bronze medalist(s)
Abolfazl Zarif	Men's 100m Backstroke S9	1:05.34	1 Q	1:04.26	1st place, gold medalist(s)
Abolfazl Zarif	Men's 100m Butterfly S9	1:16.70	5	Did not advance	
Abolfazl Zarif	Men's 200m Individual Medley SM9	2:31.21	2 Q	2:28.65	4
Shahin Izadyar	Men's 50m Freestyle S10	—N/a		26.32	2nd place, silver medalist(s)
Shahin Izadyar	Men's 100m Freestyle S10	—N/a		59.10	2nd place, silver medalist(s)
Shahin Izadyar	Men's 400m Freestyle S10	—N/a		4:38.65	3rd place, bronze medalist(s)
Shahin Izadyar	Men's 100m Breaststroke SB9	1:16.45	1 Q	1:13.23	2nd place, silver medalist(s)
Shahin Izadyar	Men's 200m Individual Medley SM10	—N/a		2:26.86	4
Sina Zeyghaminejad	Men's 50m Freestyle S10	—N/a		25.82	1st place, gold medalist(s)
Sina Zeyghaminejad	Men's 100m Freestyle S10	—N/a		56.68	1st place, gold medalist(s)
Sina Zeyghaminejad	Men's 100m Breaststroke SB9	1:18.73	1 Q	1:09.47	1st place, gold medalist(s)
Sina Zeyghaminejad	Men's 200m Individual Medley SM10	—N/a		2:23.44	3rd place, bronze medalist(s)
Mohammadhossein Karimi	Men's 50m Freestyle S13	26.48	3 Q	26.58	6
Mohammadhossein Karimi	Men's 100m Freestyle S12	—N/a		58.97	5
Mohammadhossein Karimi	Men's 100m Backstroke S12	—N/a		1:11.32	4
Mohammadhossein Karimi	Men's 100m Breaststroke SB13	1:14.60	2 Q	1:13.47	3rd place, bronze medalist(s)
Mohammadhossein Karimi	Men's 100m Butterfly S12	—N/a		1:04.08	3rd place, bronze medalist(s)
Mohammadhossein Karimi	Men's 200m Individual Medley SM13	—N/a		2:33.25	7

== Para Table tennis ==
Summary

Athlete	Event	Group Stage			Quartefinals	Semifinals	Final	
Athlete	Event	Opposition Score	Opposition Score	Rank	Opposition Score	Opposition Score	Opposition Score	Rank
Hassan Janfeshan	Men's Singles - Class 2	Uno (JPN); W 3–0	Chu (MAC); W 3–1	1 Q	Bye	Kim (KOR); L 2–3	Did not advance	3rd place, bronze medalist(s)

== Para Taekwondo ==
Men

Athlete	Event	Round of 16	Quarterfinals	Semifinals	Repechage	Finals / BM	
Athlete	Event	Opposition Score	Opposition Score	Opposition Score	Opposition Score	Opposition Score	Rank
Mohammadtaha Hassanpour	Men's K44 -58 KG	Bye	Khaulyet (MGL); W 2–0	Xiao (TPE); L 0–2	Bye	Lee (KOR); W 2–1	3rd place, bronze medalist(s)
Saeid Sadeghianpour	Men's K44 -63 KG	Bye	Harada (JPN); W 2–0	Ganbat (MGL); L 0–2	Bye	Chen (TPE); W 2–0	3rd place, bronze medalist(s)
Amirmohammad Haghighatshenas	Men's K44 -70 KG	—N/a	Askar (KAZ); W 2–0	Alikulov (UZB); W 2–0	Bye	Kudo (JPN); W 2–0	1st place, gold medalist(s)
Alireza Bakht	Men's K44 -80 KG	—N/a	Amatov (UZB); W 2–0	Pourrahnama (IRI); W 2–1	Bye	Joo (KOR); W 2–0	1st place, gold medalist(s)
Mahdi Pourrahnama	Men's K44 -80 KG	—N/a	Ganapin (PHI); W 2–0	Bakht (IRI); L 1–2	Bye	Ismael (IRQ); W 2–1	3rd place, bronze medalist(s)
Hamed Haghshenas	Men's K44 +80 KG	—N/a	Eom (KOR); W 2–0	Liu (CHN); W 2–0	Bye	Muydinov (UZB); W 2–0	1st place, gold medalist(s)

Women

Athlete	Event	Quarterfinals	Semifinals	Repechage	Finals / BM	
Athlete	Event	Opposition Score	Opposition Score	Opposition Score	Opposition Score	Rank
Ailar Jami	Women's K44 -47 KG	Musinova (UZB); W 2–0	Yan (CHN); W 2–0	Bye	Phuangkitcha (THA); W 2–0	1st place, gold medalist(s)
Roza Ebrahimi	Women's K44 -52 KG	Rustamova (UZB); L 1–2	Did not advance	Krassavtseva (KAZ); W 2–0	Shao (CHN); L 0–2	5
Maryam Abdollahpour	Women's K44 -57 KG	Melikuzieva (UZB); W 2–0	Li (CHN); L 0–2	Bye	Goverdhan (NEP); W 2–0	3rd place, bronze medalist(s)
Zahra Rahimi	Women's K44 -57 KG	Goverdhan (NEP); W 2–0	Rasulova (UZB); W 2–0	Bye	Li (CHN); L 1–2	2nd place, silver medalist(s)
Parimah Tourani	Women's K44 -65 KG	Yinan (CHN); L 0–2	Did not advance	Cahyani (SIN); W 2–0	Bikbulatova (UZB); W 2–1	3rd place, bronze medalist(s)
Romina Chamsouraki	Women's K44 +65 KG	Nasrollahi (IRI); L 1–2	Did not advance	Dauletshina (KAZ); W 2–0	Kosimova (UZB); L 0–2	5
Marzieh Nasrollahi	Women's K44 +65 KG	Chamsouraki (IRI); W 2–1	Qi (CHI); L 1–2	Bye	Xu (CHN); W 2–1	3rd place, bronze medalist(s)

== Wheelchair basketball ==
Iran men's national wheelchair basketball team and Iran women's national wheelchair basketball team will take part in the wheelchair basketball tournament.

Summary

Men's

Team	Event	Group Stage				Quartefinals	Semifinals	Final / BM	
Team	Event	Opposition Score	Opposition Score	Opposition Score	Rank	Opposition Score	Opposition Score	Opposition Score	Rank
Iran men's	Men's tournament	Iraq; W 81–23	South Korea; W 67–62	Philippines; W 71–45	1 Q	Kuwait; W 110–43	Thailand; W 83–50	Japan; L 47–55	2nd place, silver medalist(s)

Women's

Team	Event	Group Stage						Final / BM / 5P	
Team	Event	Opposition Score	Opposition Score	Opposition Score	Opposition Score	Opposition Score	Rank	Opposition Score	Rank
Iran women's	Women's tournament	Japan; L 20–65	Thailand; L 33–64	Cambodia; W 52–39	Laos; W 68–27	China; L 11–61	4 QB	Thailand; L 33–64	4

== Wheelchair fencing ==
Team	Event	Group Stage						Round of 32	Round of 16	Quarterfinal	Final / BM	
Team	Event	Opposition Score	Opposition Score	Opposition Score	Opposition Score	Opposition Score	Opposition Score	Opposition Score	Opposition Score	Rank	Opposition Score	Rank
Mahdi Abedi	Men's Sabre Category A	Kano (JPN); L 0–5	Surjai (JPN); L 2–5	Sodikov (UZB); L 0–5	Kadhim (IRQ); L 1–5	Diantoro (INA); W 5–4	6	Did not advance				
Sepeedeh Sohrabi Athar	Women's Sabre Category A	Yoshizawa (JPN); W 5–4	Rakhmanova (UZB); L 2–5	Lam (HKG); L 1–5	Thongdaeng (THA); L 2–5	Chen (CHN); W 5–2	4 Q	Bye	Yu (HKG); L 2–15	Did not advance		

== See also ==
- Iran at the 2026 Asian Games
