= Taekwondo at the 2024 Summer Paralympics – Women's 65 kg =

Taekwondo – Women's 65 kg K44 at the XVII Paralympic Games
- Venue: Grand Palais, Paris
- Date: 30 August 2024
- Competitors: 12 from 12 nations

Medalists
1st place, gold medalist(s)		Ana Carolina Moura	Brazil
2nd place, silver medalist(s)		Djélika Diallo	France
3rd place, bronze medalist(s)		Lisa Gjessing	Denmark
3rd place, bronze medalist(s)		Christina Gkentzou	Greece

The women's 65 kg taekwondo competition at the 2024 Summer Paralympics was held on 30 August 2024 at the Grand Palais, Paris. 12 athletes took part.

== Results ==
Bracket

Round of 16
Constanza Fuentes (CHI)	0
Yao Yinan (CHN)	30
Lisa Gjessing (DEN)	25
Junita Tonowane (SOL)	0
Marie Antoinette Dassi (CMR)	15
Elena Savinskaya (NPA)	2
Christina Gkentzou (GRE)	22
Patrycja Zewar (POL)	0

Quarter-finals
Beth Munro (GBR)	16
Yao Yinan (CHN)	20
Lisa Gjessing (DEN)	4
Djélika Diallo (FRA)	6
Seçil Er (TUR)	6
Marie Antoinette Dassi (CMR)	13
Christina Gkentzou (GRE)	7
Ana Carolina Moura (BRA)	11

Semi-finals
Yao Yinan (CHN)	12
Djélika Diallo (FRA)	18
Marie Antoinette Dassi (CMR)	1
Ana Carolina Moura (BRA)	21

Final
Djélika Diallo (FRA)	7
Ana Carolina Moura (BRA)	17

Repechage

Repechage
Beth Munro (GBR)	2
Lisa Gjessing (DEN)	10
Seçil Er (TUR)	2
Christina Gkentzou (GRE)	23

Bronze medal
Lisa Gjessing (DEN)	6
Marie Antoinette Dassi (CMR)	2
Christina Gkentzou (GRE)	14
Yao Yinan (CHN)	4
