= Taekwondo at the 2020 Summer Paralympics – Women's 58 kg =

Taekwondo – Women's 58 kg K44 at the XVI Paralympic Games
- Venue: Makuhari Messe Hall B
- Date: 3 September 2021
- Competitors: 11 from 11 nations

Medalists
1st place, gold medalist(s)		Lisa Gjessing	Denmark
2nd place, silver medalist(s)		Beth Munro	Great Britain
3rd place, bronze medalist(s)		Silvana Fernandes	Brazil
3rd place, bronze medalist(s)		Li Yujie	China

The women's 58 kg taekwondo competition at the 2020 Summer Paralympics was held on 3 September 2021 at the Makuhari Messe Hall B.

== Results ==
=== Bracket ===
Round of 16
Salma Abohegazy (EGY)	12
Shauna-Kay Hines (JAM)	9
Kamilya Dosmalova (KAZ)	9
Marija Mičev (SRB)	38
Beth Munro (GBR)	21
Palesha Goverdhan (NEP)	8

Quarterfinals
Lisa Gjessing (DEN)	14
Salma Abohegazy (EGY)	3
Silvana Fernandes (BRA)	15
Brianna Salinaro (USA)	2
Li Yujie (CHN)	23
Marija Mičev (SRB)	17
Beth Munro (GBR)	34
Gamze Gürdal (TUR)	22

Semifinals
Lisa Gjessing (DEN)	8
Silvana Fernandes (BRA)	6
Li Yujie (CHN)	25
Beth Munro (GBR)	34

Final
Lisa Gjessing (DEN)	32
Beth Munro (GBR)	14

=== Repechage ===
Repechage 1
Kamilya Dosmalova (KAZ)	15
Salma Abohegazy (EGY)	41

Repechage 2
Gamze Gürdal (TUR)	17
Salma Abohegazy (EGY)	15

Bronze medal
Silvana Fernandes (BRA)	26
Gamze Gürdal (TUR)	9

Repechage 1
Shauna-Kay Hines (JAM)	5
Marija Mičev (SRB)	18
Palesha Goverdhan (NEP)	10
Brianna Salinaro (USA)	0

Repechage 2
Marija Mičev (SRB)	15
Palesha Goverdhan (NEP)	23

Bronze medal
Li Yujie (CHN)	12
Palesha Goverdhan (NEP)
