= Ana Carolina Silva de Moura =

Brazilian parataekwondo practitioner (born 1995)

Ana Carolina Moura
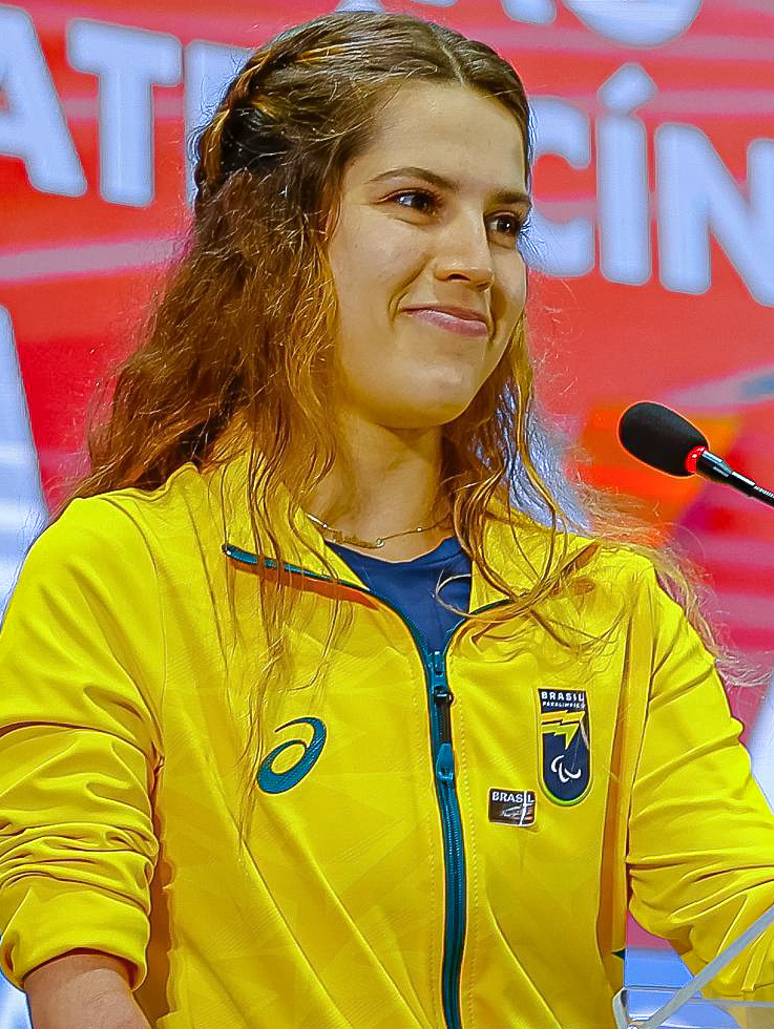
- Moura in May 2025

Personal information
- Full name: Ana Carolina Silva de Moura
- Nationality: Brazil
- Born: 27 November 1995 (age 30) Belo Horizonte, Minas Gerais, Brazil

Sport
- Country: Brazil
- Sport: Para Taekwondo
- Disability class: F44
- Weight class: 65kg
Medal record
Women's Para Taekwondo
Representing Brazil
Paralympic Games
Gold medal – first place	2024 Paris	–65 kg
World Para Championships
Gold medal – first place	2023 Vera Cruz	–65 kg
Bronze medal – third place	2021 Istanbul	–65 kg
Para Grand Prix
Gold medal – first place	2022 Riyadh	–65 kg
Gold medal – first place	2022 Paris	–65 kg
Bronze medal – third place	2023 Paris	–65 kg
Parapan American Games
Gold medal – first place	2023 Santiago	–65 kg
Pan Am Series II (Para)
Gold medal – first place	2023 Rio de Janeiro	–65 kg

Ana Carolina Silva de Moura (born 27 November 1995) also known as Carol Moura, is a Brazilian para-taekwondo practitioner who competes in the F44 classification in the –65 kg category.

She is a gold medalist at the 2024 Paralympic Games.

== Early life and background ==
Moura was born in Belo Horizonte with a congenital malformation in her right forearm. She has been involved in various sports, having practiced soccer, dance and rhythmic gymnastics before pursuing para taekwondo in 2016, in order to be able to defend herself after being robbed in downtown Belo Horizonte and losing a piece of jewelry that held sentimental value for her.

What started as a means of self-defense quickly turned into a passion for the sport and a desire to compete.

== Career ==
Moura began participating in para taekwondo in 2019. The Brazilian has since competed in multiple international events.

Moura competed at the 2023 Parapan American Games, winning the gold medal in her category. That same year she also won gold at the World Taekwondo Championships.

Moura's club had qualified three para athletes to join Brazilian team at the 2024 Paralympic Games: Her, Izabela Campos (athletics) and Arthur Xavier Ribeiro (swimming).

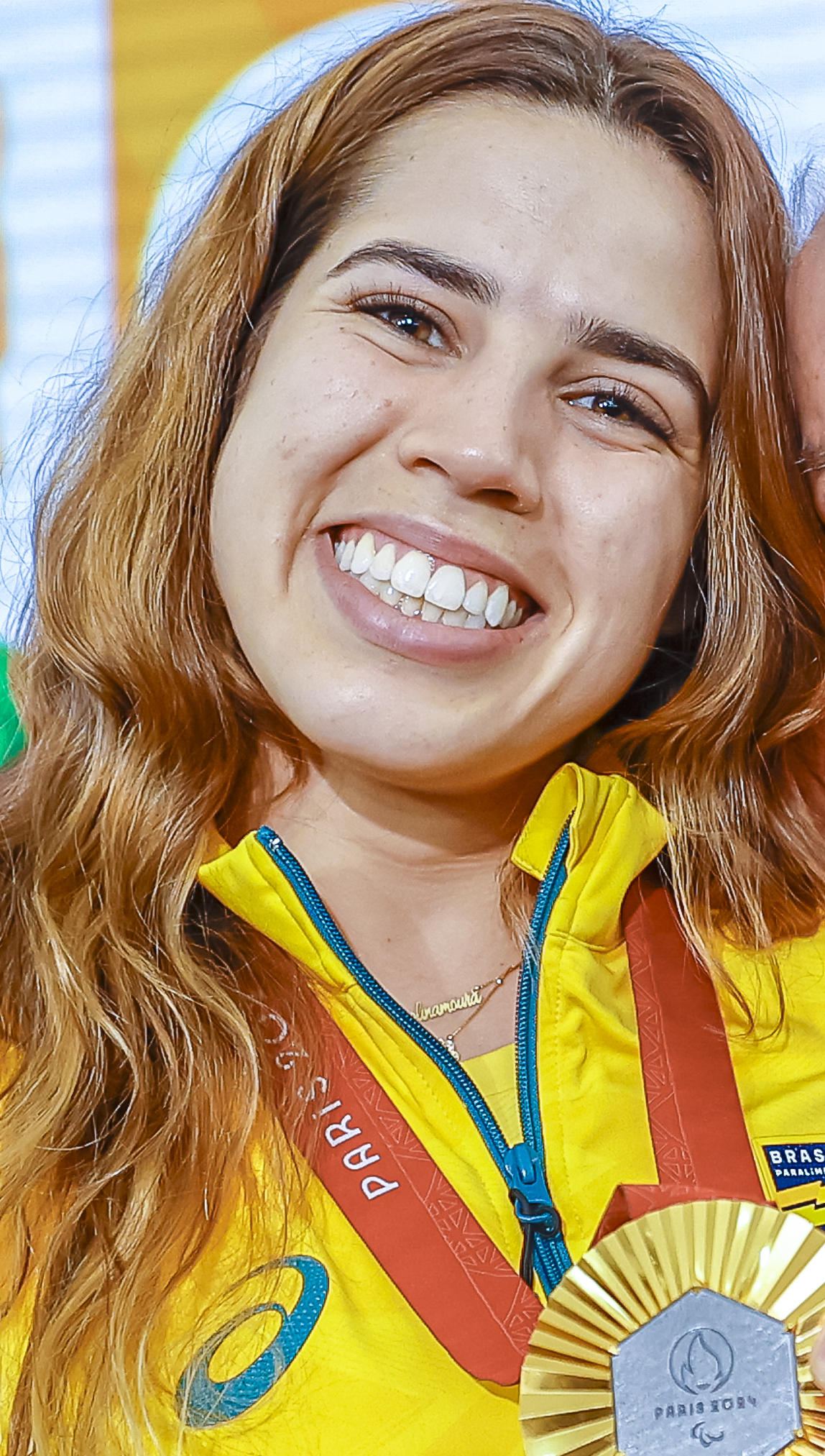
Moura in 2024

In August, Moura earned the Paralympic title in the 65 kg event, after defeating home favourite Djélika Diallo 13 to 7. With this result, Moura became Brazil's first Paralympic champion in women's para taekwondo, and the second Brazilian golden medalist after Nathan Torquato.

== Awards and honors ==
2024–25

- Prêmio Brasil Paralímpico: Athlete of the Year – para taekwondo
