= Taekwondo at the 2024 Summer Paralympics – Men's +80 kg =

Taekwondo – Men's +80 kg K44 at the XVII Paralympic Games
- Venue: Grand Palais, Paris
- Date: 31 August 2024
- Competitors: 12 from 12 nations

Medalists
1st place, gold medalist(s)		Matt Bush	Great Britain
2nd place, silver medalist(s)		Aliaskhab Ramazanov	Neutral Paralympic Athletes
3rd place, bronze medalist(s)		Evan Medell	United States
3rd place, bronze medalist(s)		Hamed Haghshenas	Iran

The men's +80 kg taekwondo competition at the 2024 Summer Paralympics was held on 31 August 2024 at the Grand Palais, Paris. 12 athletes will take part.

== Results ==
Gold medal bracket

Round of 16
Liu Ludong (CHN)	17
Julio Figuereo (DOM)	12
Mehmet Sami Saraç (TUR)	4
Idrissa Keita (SEN)	6
Ahmed Shekha (IRQ)	11
Nyshan Omirali (KAZ)	8^{RSC}
Aliaskhab Ramazanov (NPA)	16
James Ingram Gegeu (SOL)	0

Quarter-finals
Hamed Haghshenas (IRI)	19
Liu Ludong (CHN)	16
Idrissa Keita (SEN)	0
Matt Bush (GBR)	16
Evan Medell (USA)	13
Nyshan Omirali (KAZ)	3
Aliaskhab Ramazanov (NPA)	21
Ivan Mikulić (CRO)	6

Semi-finals
Hamed Haghshenas (IRI)	13
Matt Bush (GBR)	26
Evan Medell (USA)	17
Aliaskhab Ramazanov (NPA)	19

Final
Matt Bush (GBR)	5
Aliaskhab Ramazanov (NPA)	0

Repechage brackets

Repechage
Liu Ludong (CHN)	11
Idrissa Keita (SEN)	13

Bronze medal
Evan Medell (USA)	13
Idrissa Keita (SEN)	1

Repechage
Nyshan Omirali (KAZ)	24
Ivan Mikulić (CRO)	8

Bronze medal
Hamed Haghshenas (IRI)	16
Nyshan Omirali (KAZ)	14
