= Seçil (name) =

- Gender: Female
- Language: Turkish

Origin
- Language: Turkic

Seçil is a feminine Turkish given name. In Turkish, it means "chosen" or "selected". Notable people with the name include:

- Seçil Er, Turkish taekwondo athlete
