= Samson Ukpera =

Nigerian para taekwondo athlete

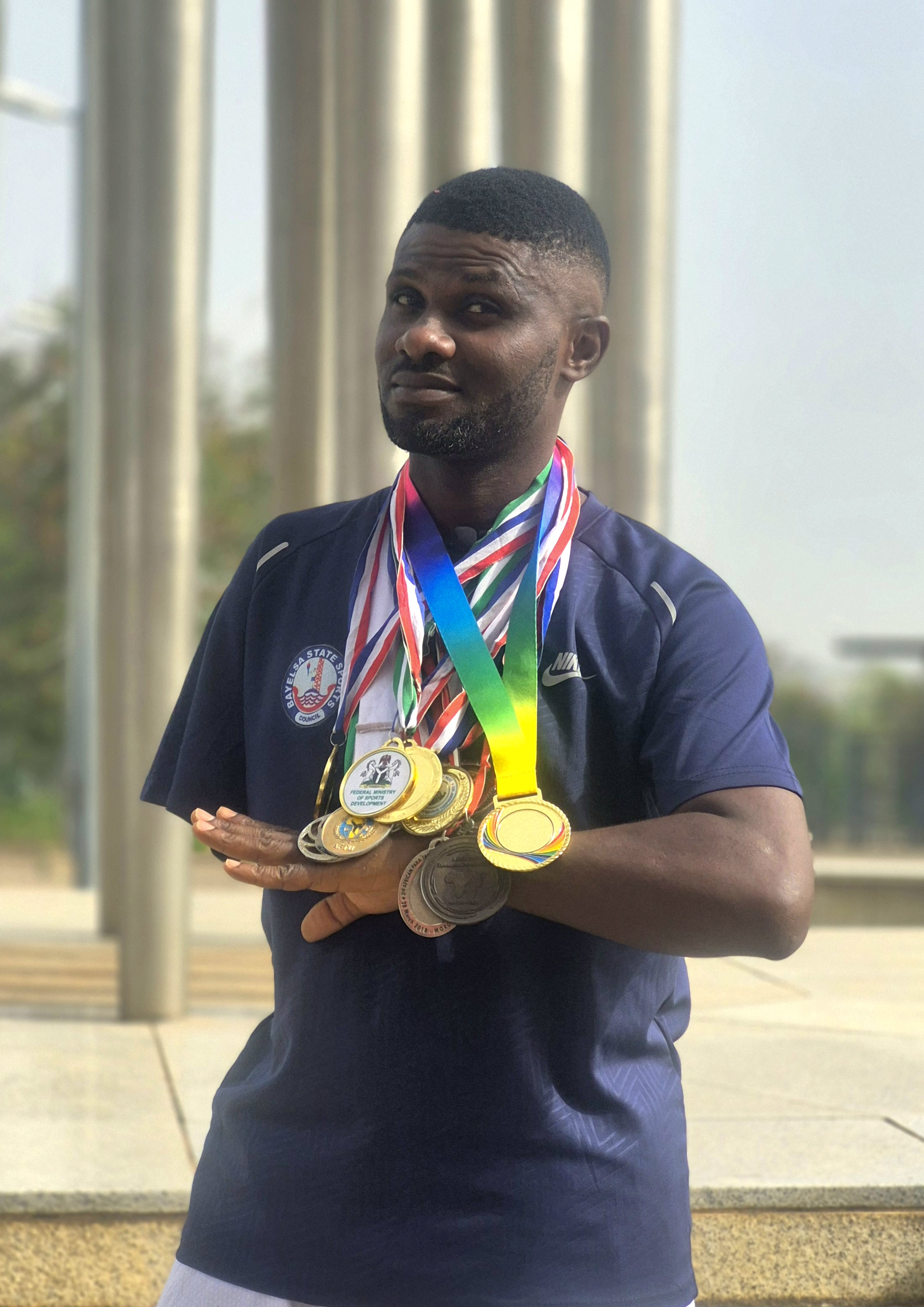
- Samson in 2026

Personal information
- Full name: Samson Saaondo Ukpera
- Nickname: Mogreat
- Nationality: Nigerian
- Born: June 10, 1991 (age 35) Kaduna
- Home town: Tiv
- Years active: 2002-present

Sport
- Country: Nigeria
- Sport: taekwondo
- Weight class: 67 kg (148 lb)
- Club: National Athlete, Elite Athlete, KCCN, Bayelsa Taekwondo Federation
- Coached by: Timothy Chigh, Late. Abdul Malik Mohamned

Achievements and titles
- Regional finals: African Para Taekwondo Open Championship 2018, Morocco
Medal record
Mens's taekwondo
Representing Nigeria
Nigerian Para Games
Bronze medal – third place	2018 Para Taewkondo Open Championship	{{{2}}}
African Games
Silver medal – second place	2018 Morocco	–61 kg
Gold medal – first place	2017 Rwanda	–61 kg
Bronze medal – third place
Bronze medal – third place		{{{2}}}

Samson Saaondo Ukpera is a Kaduna born Nigerian para-athlete based in Abuja, originally from Benue state, who competes in taekwondo. He qualified to represent Nigeria during the 2017 Africa Para-Taekwondo Open games. He emerged winner under the K42 male under 61 kg category.

== Career ==
He won a gold medal in the 2017 Africa Para-Taekwondo in Rwanda. He represented Nigeria at the Africa Para Taekwondo Open Championships in Agadir, Morocco and came second which earned him a silver medal for his country.
