= Salma Abohegazy =

Egyptian parataekwondo practitioner

Personal information
- Nationality: Egyptian
- Born: 10 April 2003 (age 23)

Sport
- Sport: Para Taekwondo
- Disability class: T44

Salma Abohegazy (born 10 April 2003) is an Egyptian parataekwondo practitioner. She competed at the 2020 Summer Paralympics in the –58 kg category reaching the quarterfinal.
