= Aliaskhab Ramazanov =

Russian para taekwondo practitioner

Personal information
- Native name: Алиасхаб Рамазанов
- Born: 18 January 1993 (age 33)

Sport
- Country: Russia
- Sport: Para taekwondo
- Weight class: +80 kg
Medal record
Men's Para taekwondo
Representing Neutral Paralympic Athletes
Paralympic Games
Silver medal – second place	2024 Paris	+80 kg

Aliaskhab Ramazanov (Russian: Алиасхаб Рамазанов; born 18 January 1993) is a Russian para taekwondo practitioner. He competed at the 2024 Summer Paralympics as a Neutral athlete and reached the finals of the men's +80 kg tournament. He lost in the final to Matt Bush, claiming silver in the 2024 Paralympics.
