= Christina Gkentzou =

Greek parataekwondo practitioner (born 2005)

Personal information
- Nationality: Greek
- Born: 26 July 2005 (age 21)
- Home town: Thessaloniki
- Height: 1.75

Sport
- Country: Greece
- Sport: Para taekwondo
- Disability: Paralysis
- Disability class: K44
- Event: –65 kg
Medal record
Women's para taekwondo
Representing Greece
Paralympic Games
Bronze medal – third place	2024 Paris	−65 kg
European Championships
Gold medal – first place	2024 Belgrade	−65 kg
Gold medal – first place	2026 Munich	−65 kg
Grand Prix
Gold medal – first place	2026 Rome	-65kg
Gold medal – first place	2026 Muju	−65 kg

Christina Gkentzou (born 26 July 2005) is a Greek Para Taekwondo athlete. She represented Greece at the 2024 Summer Paralympics and won a bronze medal in women's category -65 kg. She became the first Greek athlete to win a Paralympic medal for Greece in Taekwondo at 30/08/2024.

Gkentzou is a two time European Champion winning gold medals back to back.

She is also a student of physiotherapy at the International Hellenic University (IHU) in Thessaloniki, Greece.

== Career ==
Gkentzou represented Greece at the 2024 European Taekwondo Championships and won a gold medal.

She represented Greece at the 2024 Summer Paralympics and won a bronze medal in the −65 kg category.

She represented Greece at the 2026 European Taekwondo Champioships and won a gold medal.

She represented Greece at the 2026 Grand Prix Taekwondo Championships and won a gold medal.
