= Shauna-Kay Hines =

Jamaican parataekwondo practitioner

Personal information
- Nationality: Jamaican
- Born: 29 June 1989 (age 37)

Sport
- Sport: Para Taekwondo
- Disability class: T44
Medal record
Women's Para Taekwondo
Representing Jamaica
Parapan American Games
Bronze medal – third place	2019 Lima	58 kg

Shauna-Kay Hines (born 29 June 1989) is a Jamaican parataekwondo practitioner. She competed at the 2020 Summer Paralympics in the –58 kg category, having been the only Jamaican representative at the Paralympics competition. Hines also won a bronze medal in Taekwondo at the 2019 Parapan American Games. She was a batonbearer for the 2022 Commonwealth Games Queen's Baton Relay when the baton came to her island in April 2022.
