= Silvana Fernandes =

Brazilian parataekwondo practitioner

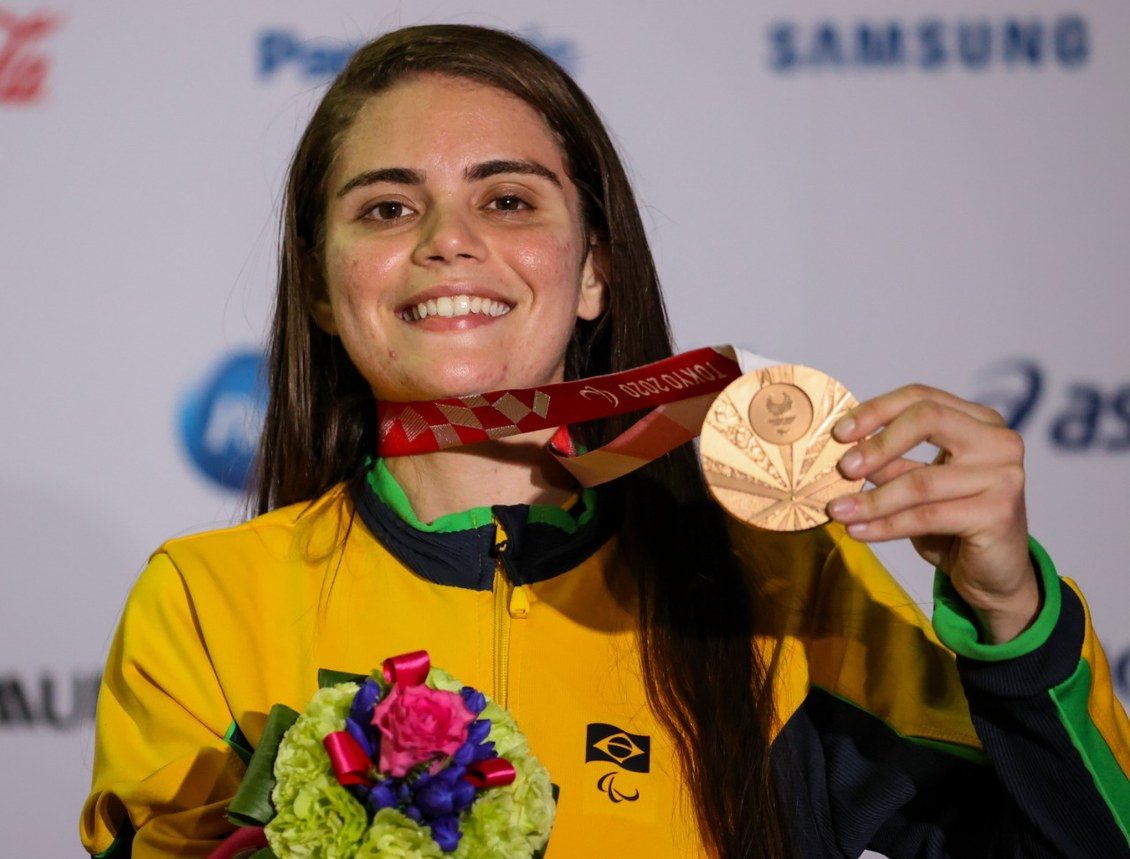
- Fernandes in 2021

Personal information
- Full name: Silvana Mayara Cardoso Fernandes
- Born: 23 April 1999 (age 27) São Bento, Paraíba, Brazil

Sport
- Sport: Para taekwondo
- Disability class: T44
Medal record
Women's para taekwondo
Representing Brazil
Summer Paralympics
Bronze medal – third place	2020 Tokyo	58 kg
Bronze medal – third place	2024 Paris	57 kg
Parapan American Games
Gold medal – first place	2019 Lima	–57 kg
Gold medal – first place	2023 Santiago	−57 kg

Silvana Mayara Cardoso Fernandes (born 23 April 1999) is a Brazilian para taekwondo practitioner.

== Career ==
Fernandes began training in javelin throwing but soon became interested in parataekwondo. At the 2020 Summer Paralympics, she won a bronze medal in the –58 kg category.
