= Hamed Haghshenas =

Iranian parataekwondo practitioner (born 1994)

Personal information
- Nationality: Iranian
- Born: 23 March 1994 (age 32)
- Home town: Isfahan, Iran

Sport
- Sport: Para taekwondo
- Disability class: K44
- Event: +80 kg
Medal record
Men's para taekwondo
Representing Iran
Paralympic Games
Bronze medal – third place	2024 Paris	+80 kg
Asian Para Games
Gold medal – first place	2022 Hangzhou	+80 kg
Gold medal – first place	2026 Aichi–Nagoya	+80 kg

Hamed Haghshenas (born 23 March 1994) is an Iranian para taekwondo practitioner. He represented Iran at the 2024 Summer Paralympics.

== Career ==
Haghshenas represented Iran at the 2022 Asian Para Games and won a gold medal in the +80 kg category.

He represented Iran at the 2024 Summer Paralympics and won a bronze medal in the +80 kg category.
