= Yuliya Lypetska =

Ukrainian parataekwondo player (born 1986)

Personal information
- Born: 8 January 1986 (age 40) Zaporizhzhia, Soviet Union

Sport
- Sport: Parataekwondo
- Disability class: K44
Medal record
Representing Ukraine
World Championships
Bronze medal – third place	2019 Antalya	-57kg K44
Bronze medal – third place	2021 Istanbul	-57kg K44
European Championships
Silver medal – second place	2019 Bari	+58kg K44
Bronze medal – third place	2022 Manchester	-65kg K44
European Para Championships
Bronze medal – third place	2023 Rotterdam	-57kg K44

Yuliya Yevhenivna Lypetska (Ukrainian: Юлія Євгенівна Липецька; born 8 January 1986) is a Ukrainian para taekwondo practitioner who competes at international taekwondo competitions, she is a two-time World bronze medalist and a European silver medalist. She competed at the 2020 and 2024 Summer Paralympics.
