= Lisa Gjessing =

Danish parataekwondo practitioner (born 1978)

Personal information
- Full name: Lisa Kjær Gjessing
- Nationality: Danish
- Born: 4 July 1978 (age 48) Denmark

Sport
- Sport: Para Taekwondo
- Disability: Lower left arm amputee
- Disability class: F44
Medal record
Women's Para Taekwondo
Representing Denmark
Paralympic Games
Gold medal – first place	2020 Tokyo	58 kg
Bronze medal – third place	2024 Paris	65 kg
World Para Championships
Gold medal – first place	2013 Lausanne	–57 kg
Gold medal – first place	2014 Moscow	–58 kg
Gold medal – first place	2015 Samsun	–58 kg
Gold medal – first place	2017 London	–58 kg
Bronze medal – third place	2019 Antalya	–58 kg
European Championships
Gold medal – first place	2016 Warsaw	–58 kg
Gold medal – first place	2018 Plovdiv	–58 kg
Gold medal – first place	2019 Bari	–58 kg
Bronze medal – third place	2022 Manchester	–65 kg

Lisa Kjær Gjessing (born 4 July 1978) is a Danish former para taekwondo practitioner.

Gjessing is widely acclaimed as one of the greatest athletes on women's para taekwondo history: She is a gold medalist at the 2020 Paralympic Games, as well as bronze medalist at the 2024 edition. She is also a four-time World Para Champion and earned three European titles.

== Career ==
Gjessing represented the Danish team in able-bodied taekwondo at the 2001 and 2003 World Taekwondo Championships. After having her left armed amputated in 2009, she then competed in para taekwondo, winning the world title in 2013, a feat she would repeat in 2014, 2015 and 2017. At the 2019 World Championships, Gjessing broke her arm during the quarterfinals but nonetheless won the bronze medal.

In 2021, Gjessing was ranked world number 1. She competed at the 2020 Paralympic Games in the –58 kg category, having qualified via World Ranking. She was also one of the flag bearers for Denmark during the opening ceremony of the Paralympics. Para taekwondo made its debut there, and Gjessing won the gold medal, beating Great Britain's Beth Munro 32-14 in the final. She competed at the 2022 European Para Championships, winning a bronze medal in the K44 wommen's -65 kg event.

On 1 February 2024, Gjessing announced that she would retire from para taekwondo after the 2024 Paralympic Games in Paris. Competing in the 65 kg event, she had lost to Djelika Diallo in the quarterfinals. Heading to the repechage round, she defeated Munro and then defeated Marie Antoinette Dassi to win the bronze and ending her career.

== Personal life ==
Gjessing had her lower left arm amputated in 2012 due to chondrosarcoma. She is married and has two daughters.
