= Djélika Diallo =

French parataekwondo practitioner (born 2005)

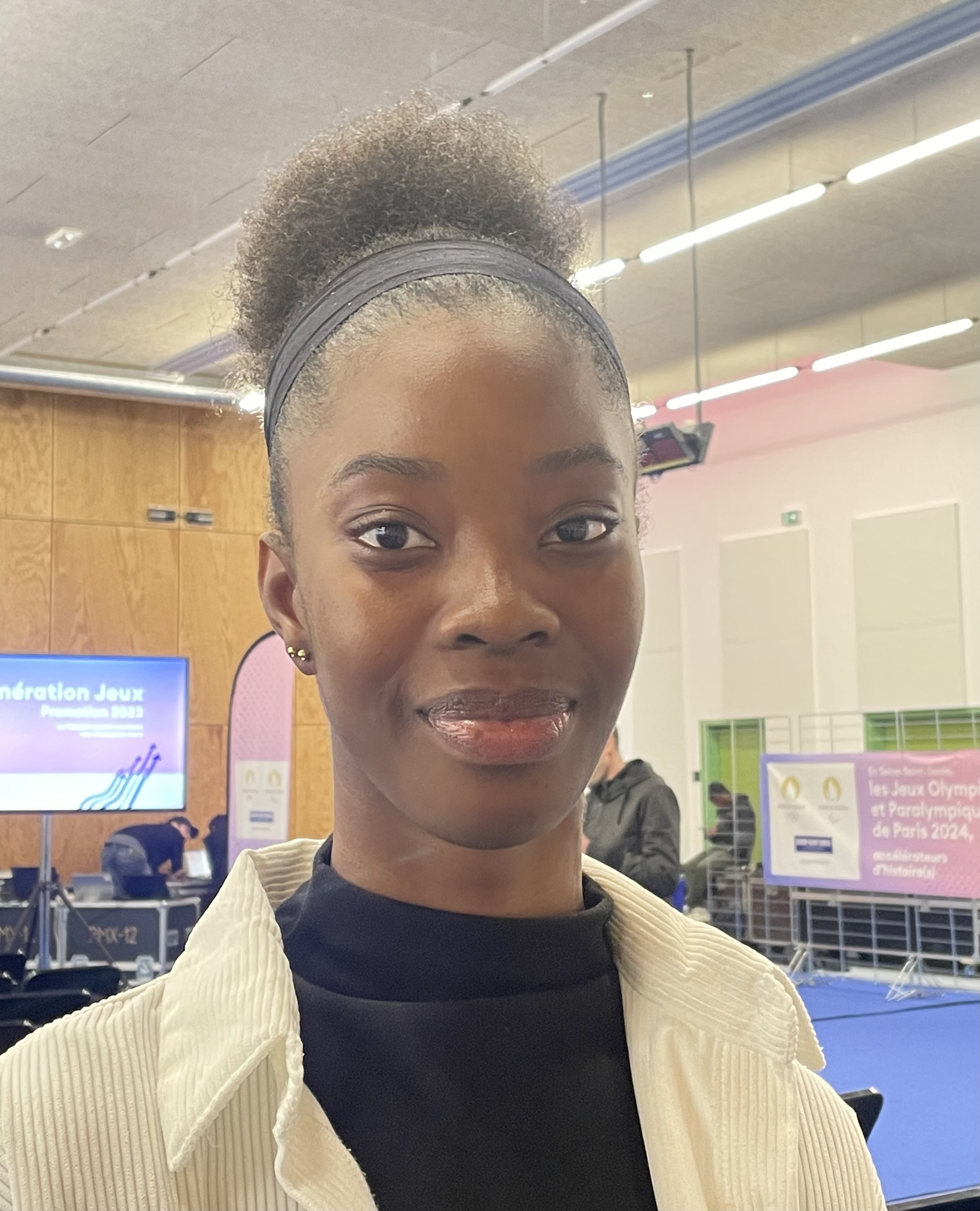

Personal information
- Nationality: France
- Born: 8 April 2005 (age 21) Stains, Seine-Saint-Denis, France

Sport
- Country: France
- Sport: Para Taekwondo
- Disability class: F44
- Weight class: 65kg
Medal record
Women's Para Taekwondo
Representing France
Summer Paralympics
Silver medal – second place	2024 Paris	65 kg
European Championships
Silver medal – second place	2024 Belgrade	-65 kg

Djelika Diallo (born 8 April 2005) is a French para-taekwondo practitioner who competes in the F44 classification in the under 65 kg category.

== Biography ==
Diallo started para-taekwondo around the age of 14 after an initiation at school in Épinay-sur-Seine. Licensed to the Dugny clubs, she enrolled at INSEP in 2022. In 2023, she participated in the European Para-Taekwondo Championships in Rotterdam. In 2024, she also won the silver medal at the European Para-Taekwondo Championships in Belgrade.

She is qualified for the 2024 Paralympic Games.
