= Seçil Er =

Turkish Para Taekwondo practitioner

Medal record

Para Taekwondo

Representing Turkey

World Championships
Gold medal – first place	2021 Istanbul	K44 -65 kg

European Championships
Silver medal – second place	2022 Manchester	K44 -65 kg
Gold medal – first place	2021 Istanbul	K44 -65 kg

European Para Championships
Bronze medal – third place	2023 Rotterdam	K44 -65 kg

Seçil Er is a Turkish world and European champion Para Taekwondo practitioner. She competes in the K44 event of the -65 kg class.

== Personal life ==
Seçil Er is a native of Çankırı Province's Yukarı Pleitözü village.

== Sports career ==
Before switching over to Para Taekwondo, Er played Para-badminton. Motivated by a kickboxer friend of her, she initially wanted to practice Para Taekwondo as a hobby. Her friend's coach helped her enter the upcoming Turkish Para Taekwondo Championships. In 2019 at age 27, she started her Para Taekwondo career.

She won the gold medal at the 2021 European Para Taekwondo Championships held in Istanbul, Turkey. She became champion at the 2021 World Para Taekwondo Championships in Istanbul, Turkeyç She took the silver medal at the 2022 European Taekwondo Championships in Manchester, United Kingdom.
