= Brianna Salinaro =

Taekwondo practitioner at Paralympics

Personal information
- Born: 10 May 1998 (age 28) Massapequa, New York, United States

Sport
- Sport: Paralympic athletics Para taekwondo
Medal record
Representing United States
Paralympic athletics
Parapan American Games
Gold medal – first place	2023 Santiago	100m T35
Gold medal – first place	2023 Santiago	200m T35
Para taekwondo
World Championships
Bronze medal – third place	2017 London	K44 -58kg

Brianna Salinaro (born May 10, 1998) is a track and field athlete and former taekwondo practitioner who represented the United States at the 2020 Summer Paralympics. She has cerebral palsy and is from Massapequa, New York. She started Taekwondo at age 9 and in 2016 became the first female para Taekwondo athlete to represent the United States at an international tournament.

She was the only Para Taekwondo athlete to compete at the 2020 Paralympic games with Cerebral Palsy. All of Brianna's competitors were upper amputee athletes. She compete in the K44 -58 kg category.
