= Sophie Caverzan =

French para-taekwondo practitioner (born 1995)

Personal information
- Born: 3 May 1995 (age 31) Montauban, France

Sport
- Sport: Parataekwondo
Medal record
Representing France
World Championships
Bronze medal – third place	2023 Veracruz	-57kg K44
European Championships
Silver medal – second place	2024 Belgrade	-57kg K44
Bronze medal – third place	2023 Rotterdam	-57kg K44
Bronze medal – third place	2026 Munich	−57kg K44

Sophie Caverzan (born 3 May 1995) is a French para-taekwondo practitioner who competes in international taekwondo competitions, she is a World bronze medalist and European silver medalist. She competed at the 2024 Summer Paralympics.
