= Beth Munro =

British parataekwondo practitioner

Personal information
- Nationality: British
- Born: 23 June 1993 (age 33)

Sport
- Sport: Para Taekwondo
- Disability class: T44
Medal record
Women's Para Taekwondo
Representing Great Britain
Summer Paralympics
Silver medal – second place	2020 Tokyo	58 kg
European Para Championships
Gold medal – first place	2023 Rotterdam	65kg K44

Beth Munro (born 23 June 1993) is a British parataekwondo practitioner from Liverpool. She competed at the 2020 Summer Paralympics in the –58 kg K44 category. She won a silver medal and it was the UK's first Taekwondo medal.

== Life ==
Munro comes from Litherland, a town in the north west of England. She received secondary education at Litherland High School. When she was born in 1993 she had a weakness in one arm. She had an ambition to get to the Paralympics and she was initially interested in Netball. She intended to switch to the javelin, but she was recruited two years before the postponed 2020 Summer Paralympics by Anthony Hughes of Disability Sport Wales to take up Taekwondo. The martial art which would make its debut as a Paralympic sport in the "2020" games in Tokyo.

She was classified to compete in the –58 kg K44 category.

Munro's first match was a 21–8 win over Palesha Goverdhan of Nepal which she won 21–8. In the second round she had a more difficult match against Gamze Gürdal of Turkey, but she won 34–22.

She won a silver medal after being defeated by Lisa Gjessing of Denmark. It was the UK's first Taekwondo medal.
