= Marija Mičev =

Serbian para taekwondo athlete

Personal information
- Born: 7 November 1996 (age 29)

Sport
- Disability class: K44
Medal record
Women's Para Taekwondo
Representing Serbia
World Para Taekwondo Championships
Silver medal – second place	2019 Antaliya	−58 kg K44
European Taekwondo Championships
Silver medal – second place	2022 Manchester	−57 kg K44
Silver medal – second place	2023 Rotterdam	−57 kg K44
Bronze medal – third place	2017 Sofia	−58 kg K44
Bronze medal – third place	2026 Munich	−52 kg K44

Marija Mičev (Serbian Cyrillic: Марија Мичев; born 7 November 1996) is a Serbian para taekwondo athlete. She participated at the 2020 Summer Paralympics in Tokyo (women's 58 kg), and the 2024 Summer Paralympics in Paris (women's 57 kg). In Paris, Mičev was eliminated in the semifinals, but lost the bronze medal match.

Mičev won bronze medal in the women's 58 kg category at the 2017 European Para Taekwondo Championships. At the 2019 World Para Taekwondo Championships in Antalya, she won silver medal in the same category. At the 2022 European Taekwondo Championships in Manchester, she won silver medal in the women's 57 kg category. At the 2023 European Para Championships in Rotterdam, she won silver medal again in the same category.
