= Kamilya Dosmalova =

Kazakhstani parataekwondo practitioner

Personal information
- Nationality: Kazakhstani
- Born: 11 August 1992 (age 33) Kyzylorda, Kazakhstan

Sport
- Sport: Para Taekwondo
- Disability class: T44
Medal record
Para Taekwondo
Representing Kazakhstan
European Championships
Gold medal – first place	2021 Istanbul	57 kg
Asian Para Games
Silver medal – second place	2022 Hangzhou	57 kg

Kamilya Dosmalova (born 11 August 1992) is a Kazakhstani parataekwondo practitioner. She competed at the 2020 Summer Paralympics in the –58 kg category.

== Results ==
World Championships

5 Women K44 -58 kg 2019 Antalya, TUR

European Championships

5 Women K44 -58 kg 2016 Warsaw, POL
