= Gamze Gürdal =

Turkish Paralympic taekwondo practitioner (born 1995)

Personal information
- Full name: Gamze Gürdal Özcan
- Born: 12 June 1995 (age 31) Erzurum, Turkey

Sport
- Sport: Para Taekwondo
- Disability class: K44
- Team: EGO Spor Club
Medal record
Women's Para Taekwondo
Representing Turkey
Paralympic Games
Silver medal – second place	2024 Paris	57 kg
European Championships
Gold medal – first place	2022 Manchester	−57 kg K44
Gold medal – first place	2024 Belgrade	−57 kg K44
Gold medal – first place	2026 Munich	−57 kg K44
Silver medal – second place	2021 Istanbul	−57 kg K44
European Para Championships
Gold medal – first place	2023 Rotterdam	–57 kg K44

Gamze Gürdal Özcan (born Gamze Gürdal; 12 June 1995), also known as Gamze Özcan, is a Turkish European champion Para Taekwondo practitioner competing in the K44 disability class of -57 kg event.

== Sport career ==
Gürdal is 170 cm (5 ft 7 in) tall at 57 kg (126 lb). She is a member of EGO SK of the Ankara Metropolitan Municipality, and is coached by Kürşat Özdemir.

She obtained a quota for participation at the 2020 Summer Paralympics in Tokyo, Japan. She won the gold medal at the 2022 European Taekwondo Championships in Manchester, United Kingdom. At the 2023 European Para Championships in Rotterdam, Netherlands, she took the gold medal. She captured the gold medal at the 2026 European Taekwondo Championships in Munich, Germany.

== Personal life ==
Gamze Gürdal was born in Erzurum, Turkey on 12 June 1995. She currently lives in Konya. After her marriage, she took the surname Özcan.
