= Li Yujie (taekwondo) =

Chinese parataekwondo practitioner

Personal information
- Nationality: Chinese
- Born: 22 August 2001 (age 24) China

Sport
- Sport: Para Taekwondo
- Disability class: F44
Medal record
Women's Para Taekwondo
Representing China
Summer Paralympics
Gold medal – first place	2024 Paris	57 kg
Bronze medal – third place	2020 Tokyo	58 kg
World Championships
Gold medal – first place	2019 Antalya	58 kg
European Championships
Silver medal – second place	2019 Bari	58 kg
Asian Para Games
Bronze medal – third place	2022 Hangzhou	57 kg

Li Yujie (born 22 August 2001) is a Chinese parataekwondo practitioner.

== Career ==
She competed at the 2020 Summer Paralympics in the –58 kg category, having qualified via World Ranking, and won a bronze medal
