= Para taekwondo =

Adapted sport for impaired athletes

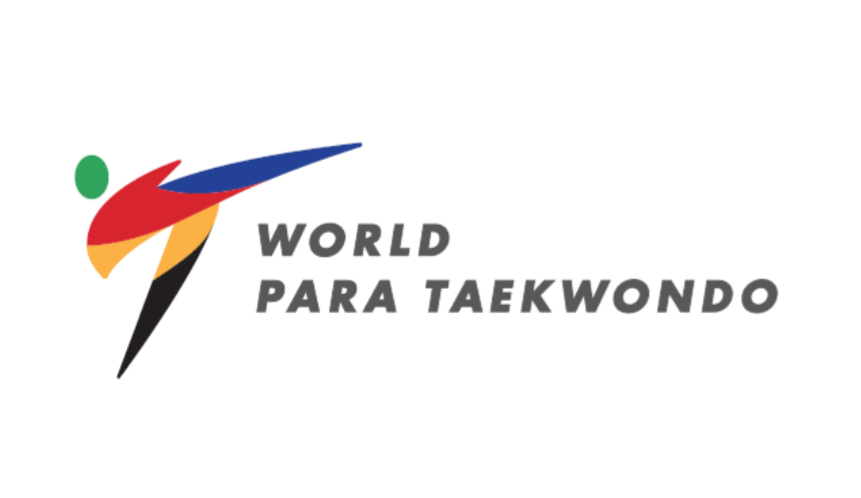
- World Para Taekwondo Logo
- Highest governing body: World Taekwondo (WT)
- First World Para Taekwondo Championship: 2009

Characteristics
- Contact: WT Lausanne Office

Presence
- Country or region: Worldwide
- Paralympic: 2020 Tokyo Paralympic

Para taekwondo is an adaptation of taekwondo for disabled sportspeople. The sport's main governing body is World Taekwondo (WT). New disciplines such as kyorugi and poomsae, both martial arts forms, have been developed for Para athletes. On 31 January 2017, Para Taekwondo was confirmed as a sport for the 2020 Tokyo Paralympic Games at the International Paralympic Committee (IPC) General Assembly the same year the WT became a full member of the IPC.

== History ==
=== Origins of Para Taekwondo ===
The WT founded the Para Taekwondo Committee in 2006 to help promote and develop Taekwondo for athletes with an impairment. At first, Para Taekwondo concentrated on developing kyorugi (sparring) for arm amputees and limb-deficient athletes. The first Para Taekwondo Championships were held in Baku, Azerbaijan, in 2009. Following the unsuccessful inclusion on the Rio 2016 Paralympic Games program, a working group was put together to discuss Para Taekwondo in 2013 during the WT World Para Taekwondo Championship. The Para Taekwondo Committee invited guests from Cerebral Palsy International Sports and Recreation Association (CPISRA) and International Sports Federation for Persons with an Intellectual Disability (INAS). Following the work group's recommendations, Para Taekwondo was expanded, and worldwide competitions were made available to athletes of all impairments. Poomsae was chosen to be included in competitions for athletes with neurological, intellectual, or visual impairments. Para Taekwondo Poomsae competitions were held for the first time for intellectually impaired athletes at the fifth WT World Para Taekwondo Championships in Moscow. Para Taekwondo Poomsae was also added as a demonstration sport during the 2015 INAS Global Games and the 2015 CPISRA World Games.

=== Application process for the Paralympic Games ===
The WT became an IPC-recognized international federation in October 2013. To be included in the 2020 Tokyo Paralympics program, the WT submitted a letter of intent to the IPC in January 2014. The second stage of the application process was completed in July 2014. During the IPC Governing Board meeting in Berlin, Germany, in October 2014, the WT presented their bid to have Para Taekwondo in the 2020 Tokyo Paralympic Games. After the meeting, some sports were confirmed for the 2020 Tokyo Paralympic Games program; Para Taekwondo was not one of them. In January 2015, the IPC held a Governing Board meeting in Abu Dhabi, where the final decision on the sport program for the 2020 Tokyo Paralympics was made. Later that year, as a result of this decision, WT became an IPC member organisation.

=== Para taekwondo at the Paralympics ===
Taekwondo originates from postwar Korea and is designed for traditional fighting systems. In 2005, World Taekwondo started to develop the kyorugi (sparring) discipline in Para taekwondo, following the first world championships in 2009, held in Baku, Azerbaijdan. In 2015, it was confirmed that Para taekwondo would be part of the Paralympic program. The sport made its debut at the Tokyo 2020 Paralympic Games with a total of 70 athletes, including 36 men and 34 women, representing 37 countries. At the Paris 2024 Paralympic Games, Para taekwondo welcomed 121 athletes, who competed in 10 medal events: 5 for men and 5 for women.

== Governance ==
The WT is Para Taekwondo's governing body and sets the rules and regulations for the sport. In 2013, the WT was formally recognized by IPC and became a full member of IPC in 2015.

== Competition disciplines ==
Kyorugi and poomsae are the two disciplines that the WT conducts in competition format to include athletes of all impairments in Para Taekwondo. The rules of Para Kyorugi differ from Olympic Kyorugi, as all techniques to the head are prohibited and punches are not awarded points.

== Para Taekwondo Kyorugi ==
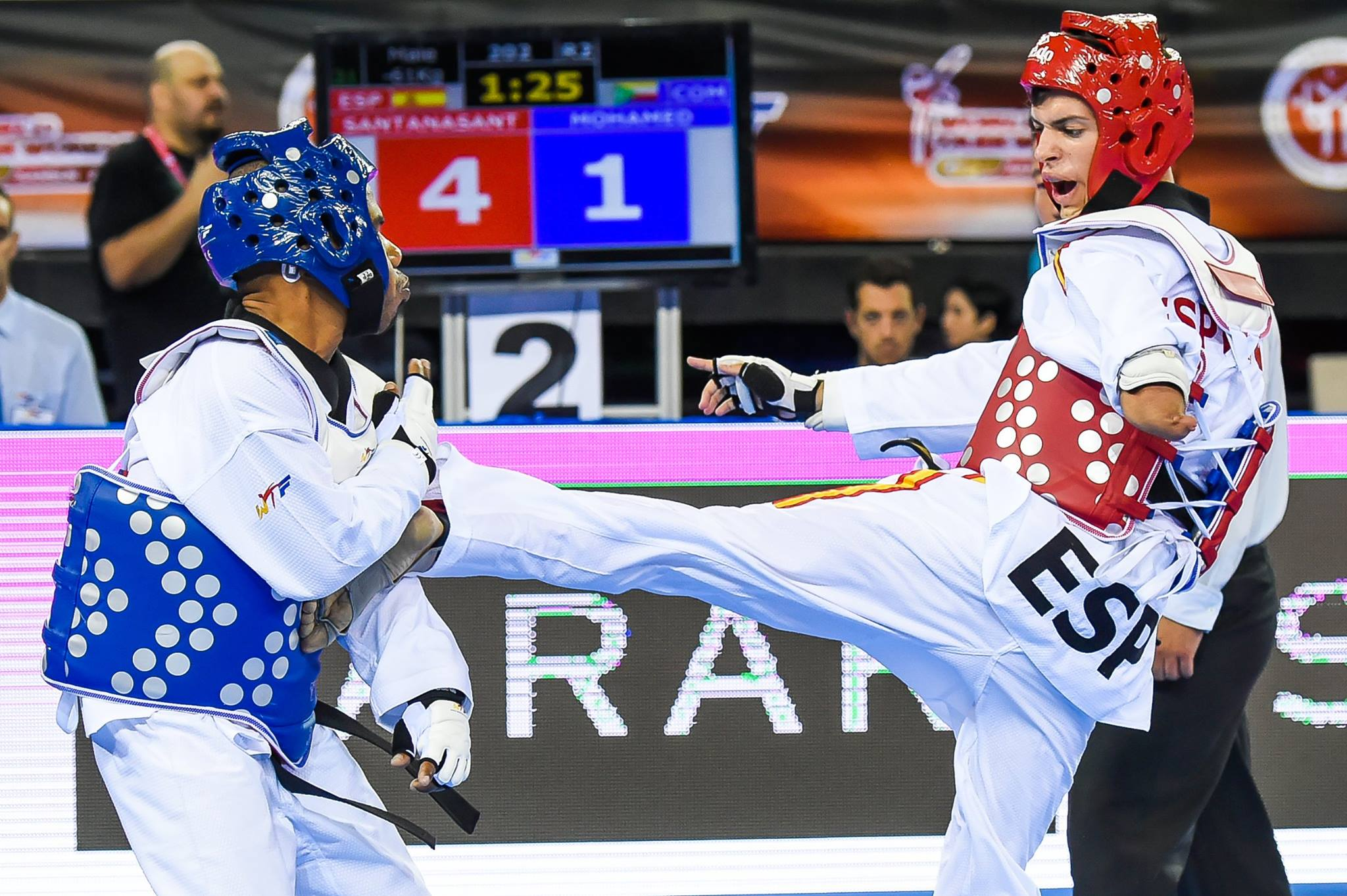
Para Taekwondo Kyorugi

=== Competition system ===
Para Taekwondo Kyorugi matches are conducted in a single elimination tournament system, a round robin system, or a single elimination tournament system with repechage.

=== Duration ===
Para Taekwondo Kyorugi competitions consist of for 3 two-minute rounds, with a one-minute rest period between rounds. If there is a tied score after the third round, the Golden Point round (fourth round) is conducted following the third round with a one-minute rest period. The match's duration may be adjusted by the technical delegate. Sport classes are taken into consideration when the technical delegate decides on duration changes.

=== Valid points ===
Two points are awarded for a valid foot technique to the trunk protector, three points for a valid turning foot technique to the trunk protector, and four points awarded for a valid spinning technique to the trunk protector. One point is awarded for every one gam-jeom (penalty deduction) given to the opponent.

=== Weight division ===
Weight divisions in Para Taekwondo Kyorugi are divided by weight and gender as follows:

Male divisions		Female divisions	
Under 61 kg	Not exceeding 61 kg	Under 49 kg	Not exceeding 49 kg
Under 75 kg	Over 61 kg and not exceeding 75 kg	Under 58 kg	Over 49 kg and not exceeding 58 kg
Over 75 kg	Over 75 kg	Over 58 kg	Over 58 kg

== Para Taekwondo Poomsae ==
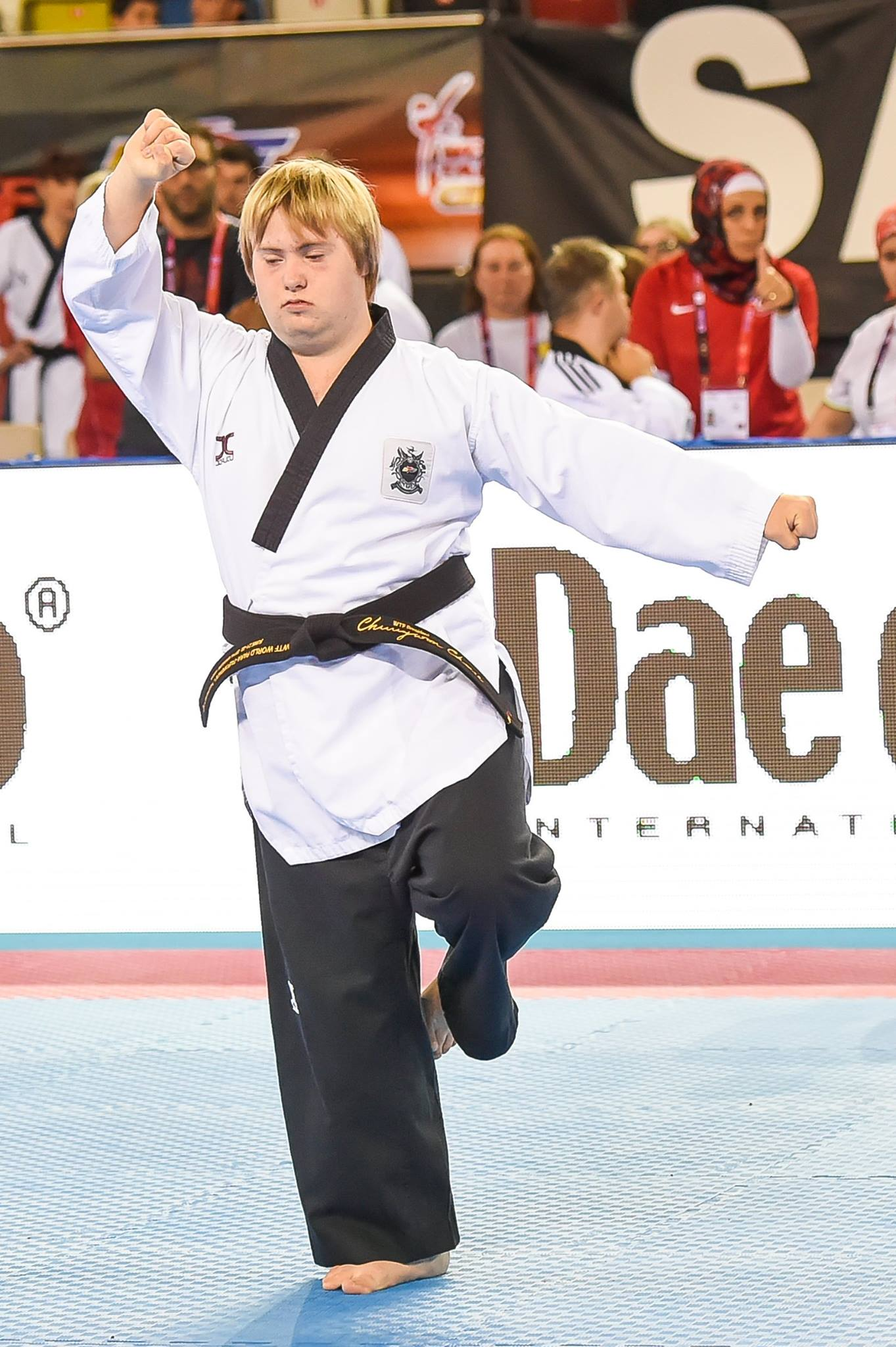
Para Taekwondo Poomsae

=== Competition system ===
Para Taekwondo Poomsae matches are conducted in a single-elimination or double-elimination tournament system.

=== Duration ===
The duration of a Para Taekwondo Poomsae competition is between 20 and 120 seconds, and the competitor must perform each poomsae with rhythm and precision during the duration. The contestants alternately perform their poomsae in a match. If a contestant finishes their poomsae earlier, their opponent is guaranteed at least a one-minute rest period between each poomsae.

=== Scoring criteria ===
The total score of Para Taekwondo Poomsae competition is 10.0 points. In the P20 Sport Class additions are made based on the difficulty of the poomsae being performed. Scoring is divided into two point categories: technical and presentation. The maximum points for each point category is as follows: Technical (4.0); Presentation (6.0).

=== Divisions ===
The divisions of Para Taekwondo Poomsae competition are divided by age and gender.

Male divisions		Female divisions	
Junior	12–15 years old	Junior	12–15 years old
Under 30	16–29 years old	Under 30	16–29 years old
Over 30	30 years old and older	Over 30	30 years old and older

== Para Taekwondo athlete evaluation ==
Athlete evaluation is the procedure where the classification panel assesses if the athlete meets the Minimum Impairment Criteria (MIC) so that the athlete may be designated a Sport Class. There are three types of assessment: physical assessment, technical assessment, and observation assessment.

=== Sport classes ===
Sport classes in Para Kyorugi and Para Poomsae have a "K" and "P" prefix, respectively.

Para Kyorugi	Impairment	Sport Classes	Para Poomsae	Impairment	Sport Classes
Para Kyorugi	LD/ Prom	K40	Para Poomsae	Visual Impairment	P10
Para Kyorugi	LD/ Prom	K40	Para Poomsae	Intellectual Disability	P20
Para Kyorugi	LD/ Prom	K40	Para Poomsae	Physical Impairments	P30
Para Kyorugi	Deaf	K60	Para Poomsae	W/C Classes	P50
Para Kyorugi	Deaf	K60	Para Poomsae	Deaf	P60
Para Kyorugi	Deaf	K60	Para Poomsae	Short Stature	P70

== Major tournaments ==
Event	Grade
Paralympic Games	N/A
World Para Taekwondo Championships	G-10
IWAS World Games	G-6
Asian Para Taekwondo Open	G-4/G-2
African Para Taekwondo Open	G-4/G-2
Oceania Para Taekwondo Open	G-4/G-2
Pan American Para Taekwondo Open	G-4/G-2
European Para Taekwondo Open	G-4/G-2
G-1 Open Tournaments for Para Taekwondo in Kyorugi and/or Poomsae	G-1

=== World Championship ===
Hosts

Kyorugi
Edition	Year	Host
1	2009	(Azerbaijan) Baku
2	2010	(Russia) St. Petersburg
3	2012	(Aruba) Santa Cruz
4	2013	(Switzerland) Lausanne
5	2014	(Russia) Moscow
6	2015	(Turkey) Samsun
7	2017	(United Kingdom) London
8	2019	(Turkey) Antalya
9	2021	(Turkey) Istanbul
10	2023	(Mexico) Veracruz
11	2026	Muju
Poomsae
Edition	Year	Host
1	2024	(Bahrain) Riffa
2	2026	TBC

Medal table

As of September 2025.

Rank	Nation	Gold	Silver	Bronze	Total
1	Russia (RUS)	27	36	35	98
2	Turkey (TUR)	22	19	35	76
3	Azerbaijan (AZE)	15	22	22	59
4	Iran (IRI)	14	8	4	26
5	Spain (ESP)	7	4	7	18
6	France (FRA)	7	2	8	17
7	Great Britain (GBR)	6	8	1	15
8	Mongolia (MGL)	6	4	13	23
9	Ukraine (UKR)	6	3	4	13
10	Kazakhstan (KAZ)	5	1	2	8
11	Serbia (SRB)	4	5	6	15
12	Brazil (BRA)	4	1	12	17
13	Canada (CAN)	4	1	3	8
14	Denmark (DEN)	4	0	1	5
15	Morocco (MAR)	3	5	8	16
16	Mexico (MEX)	3	4	7	14
17	Croatia (CRO)	3	4	5	12
18	Australia (AUS)	3	3	1	7
19	Uzbekistan (UZB)	3	2	6	11
20	Israel (ISR)	3	1	3	7
21	Thailand (THA)	2	0	1	3
22	China (CHN)	2	0	0	2
23	India (IND)	1	6	9	16
24	Bahrain (BHR)	1	2	3	6
25	Italy (ITA)	1	2	2	5
26	Colombia (COL)	1	1	2	4
26	Georgia (GEO)	1	1	2	4
28	Chinese Taipei (TPE)	1	1	0	2
29	Greece (GRE)	1	0	2	3
30	Germany (GER)	1	0	1	2
30	Rwanda (RWA)	1	0	1	2
32	Iraq (IRQ)	1	0	0	1
32	Singapore (SGP)	1	0	0	1
34	Poland (POL)	0	4	2	6
35	United States (USA)	0	3	4	7
36	Guatemala (GUA)	0	3	3	6
36	South Korea (KOR)	0	3	3	6
38	Finland (FIN)	0	2	2	4
39	Saudi Arabia (KSA)	0	1	1	2
39	United Arab Emirates (UAE)	0	1	1	2
41	Egypt (EGY)	0	1	0	1
41	Peru (PER)	0	1	0	1
43	Japan (JPN)	0	0	2	2
43	Nepal (NEP)	0	0	2	2
45	Argentina (ARG)	0	0	1	1
45	Cuba (CUB)	0	0	1	1
45	Hungary (HUN)	0	0	1	1
45	Kenya (KEN)	0	0	1	1
45	Lesotho (LES)	0	0	1	1
45	New Zealand (NZL)	0	0	1	1
45	Philippines (PHI)	0	0	1	1
45	Slovakia (SVK)	0	0	1	1
Totals (52 entries)		164	165	234	563

== Membership ==
As of August 2017, the WT has 208 member national associations from five continents. There are five continental federations–European Taekwondo Union (ETU), African Taekwondo Union (AFTU), Asian Taekwondo Union (ATU), Oceania Taekwondo Union (OTU), and Pan-American Taekwondo Union (PATU). Each continental federation is responsible for the administration, promotion and development of Para Taekwondo within its continent.

== World ranking ==
Para Taekwondo world rankings follow the rules outlined in the WT Ranking Bylaw. They are divided by classification and weight division in Para Kyorugi, and divided by Sport Class and age category in Para Poomsae. Ranking points in both Kyorugi and Poomsae are given to all participants based on G-level of championships or tournaments.

Rank	G1	G2	G4	G6	G10
1st ranked athlete	10.00	20.00	40.00	60.00	100.00
2nd ranked athlete	6.00	12.00	24.00	36.00	60.00
3rd ranked athletes	3.60	7.20	14.40	21.60	36.00
5th ranked athletes	2.16	4.32	8.64	12.96	21.60
9th ranked athletes	1.51	3.02	6.05	9.07	15.12
17th ranked athletes	1.06	2.12	4.23	6.35	10.58
33rd ranked athletes	0.74	1.48	2.96	4.45	7.41
65th ranked athletes	0.52	1.04	2.07	3.11	5.19

== See also ==
- World Taekwondo
