= Uzbekistan at the 2024 Summer Paralympics =

- Flag of Uzbekistan
- IPC code: UZB
- NPC: Uzbekistan National Paralympic Committee

in Paris, France August 28, 2024 – September 8, 2024
- Competitors: 65 in 9 sports
- Flag bearers: Mokhigul Khamdamova; Khusniddin Norbekov
- Medals Ranked 13th: Gold 10 Silver 9 Bronze 7 Total 26

Summer Paralympics appearances (overview)
- 2004; 2008; 2012; 2016; 2020; 2024

Other related appearances
- Soviet Union (1988); Unified Team (1992)

Uzbekistan competed at the 2024 Summer Paralympics in Paris, France, from 28 August to 8 September.

== Medalists ==
Medal	Name	Sport	Event	Date
Gold	Asila Mirzayorova	Athletics	Women's long jump	30 August
Gold	Kudratillokhon Marufkhujaev	Athletics	Men's shot put	30 August
Gold	Elbek Sultonov	Athletics	Men's shot put	31 August
Gold	Yorkinbek Odilov	Athletics	Men's javelin throw	31 August
Gold	Asadbek Toshtemirov	Taekwondo	Men's 80 kg	31 August
Gold	Bobirjon Omonov	Athletics	Men's shot put	2 September
Gold	Sherzod Namozov	Judo	Men's 60 kg J2	5 September
Gold	Khusniddin Norbekov	Athletics	Men's shot put	5 September
Gold	Tolibboy Yuldashev	Athletics	Men's discus throw	6 September
Gold	Nurkhon Kurbanova	Athletics	Women's javelin throw	7 September
Silver	Ziyodakhon Isakova	Taekwondo	Women's 47 kg	29 August
Silver	Kubaro Khakimova	Athletics	Women's shot put	30 August
Silver	Guljonoy Naimova	Taekwondo	Women's +65 kg	31 August
Silver	Doniyor Saliev	Athletics	Men's long jump	2 September
Silver	Server Ibragimov	Shooting	P4 Mixed 50 metre pistol SH1	4 September
Silver	Safiya Burkhanova	Athletics	Women's shot put	6 September
Silver	Kumushkhon Khodjaeva	Judo	Women's 57 kg J2	6 September
Silver	Shahinakhon Yigitalieva	Athletics	Women's javelin throw F46	6 September
Silver	Ruza Kuzieva	Powerlifting	Women's 73 kg	7 September
Bronze	Muslima Odilova	Swimming	Women's 100 metre butterfly S13	29 August
Bronze	Tolibboy Yuldashev	Athletics	Men's shot put	30 August
Bronze	Mokhigul Khamdamova	Athletics	Women's discus throw	31 August
Bronze	Nurkhon Kurbanova	Athletics	Women's shot put	2 September
Bronze	Temurbek Giyazov	Athletics	Men's high jump	6 September
Bronze	Uchkun Kuranbaev	Judo	Men's 73 kg	6 September
Bronze	Davurkhon Karomatov	Judo	Men's 90 kg	7 September

Medals by sport
Sport	1st place, gold medalist(s)	2nd place, silver medalist(s)	3rd place, bronze medalist(s)	Total
Athletics	8	4	4	16
Judo	1	1	2	4
Shooting	0	1	0	1
Swimming	0	0	1	1
Taekwondo	1	2	0	3
Powerlifting	0	1	0	1
Total	10	9	7	26

Medals by day
Day	1st place, gold medalist(s)	2nd place, silver medalist(s)	3rd place, bronze medalist(s)	Total
August 29	0	1	1	2
August 30	2	1	1	4
August 31	3	1	1	5
September 1	0	0	0	0
September 2	1	1	1	3
September 3	0	0	0	0
September 4	0	1	0	1
September 5	2	0	0	2
September 6	1	3	2	6
September 7	1	1	1	3
Total	10	9	7	26

Medals by gender
Gender	1st place, gold medalist(s)	2nd place, silver medalist(s)	3rd place, bronze medalist(s)	Total
Male	8	2	4	14
Female	2	7	3	12
Total	10	9	7	26

== Competitors ==
The following is the list of number of competitors in the Games.

Sport	Men	Women	Total
Athletics	13	12	25
Cycling	2	0	2
Judo	5	3	8
Paracanoeing	3	3	6
Powerlifting	3	5	8
Rowing	1	1	2
Shooting	1	1	2
Swimming	5	2	7
Taekwondo	3	2	5
Total	36	29	65

== Athletics ==
Uzbek track and field athletes achieved quota places for the following events based on their results at the 2023 World Championships, 2024 World Championships, or through high performance allocation, as long as they meet the minimum entry standard (MES).

Key

- Note–Ranks given for track events are within the athlete's heat only
- Q = Qualified for the next round
- q = Qualified for the next round as a fastest loser or, in field events, by position without achieving the qualifying target
- DQ = Disqualified
- PR = Paralympic Record
- AR = Area (or continental) Record
- NR = National Record
- SB = Season's Best
- N/A = Round not applicable for the event
- Bye = Athlete not required to compete in round

Track and road events
Men

Athlete	Event	Heat		Semifinal		Final	
Athlete	Event	Time	Rank	Time	Rank	Time	Rank
Urganchbek Egamnazarov	Men's 100 m T11	11.68	2 q	11.75	4	Did not advance	
Urganchbek Egamnazarov	Men's 400 m T11	52.90	1 Q	52.98	4	Did not advance	
Doniyorjon Akhmedov	Men's 100 m T13	11.42	6	Did not advance			
Izzat Turgunov	Men's 100 m T36	12.82	5	Did not advance			
Izzat Turgunov	Men's 400 m T36	—N/a				1:04.31	7
Marufjon Murodulloev	Men's 400 m T47	49.19	4 q	—N/a		48.89	5

Women

Athlete	Event	Heat		Semifinal		Final	
Athlete	Event	Time	Rank	Time	Rank	Time	Rank
Asila Mirzayorova	Women's 100 m T11	13.08	3	Did not advance			
Asila Mirzayorova	Women's 200 m T11	27.31	4	Did not advance			
Asila Mirzayorova	Women's 400 m T11	DSQ		Did not advance			
Yokutkhon Kholbekova	Women's 400 m T12	DNS		Did not advance			

Field events
Men

Athlete	Event	Final	
Athlete	Event	Distance	Position
Temurbek Giyazov	Men's high jump T64	2.03	3rd place, bronze medalist(s)
Urganchbek Egamnazarov	Men's long jump T11	6.09	5
Doniyor Saliev	Men's long jump T12	7.16	2nd place, silver medalist(s)
Doniyorjon Akhmedov	Men's long jump T13	6.62	6
Izzat Turgunov	Men's long jump T36	5.58	8
Elbek Sultonov	Men's shot put F12	16.45	1st place, gold medalist(s)
Khusniddin Norbekov	Men's shot put F35	16.82	1st place, gold medalist(s)
Kudratillokhon Marufkhujaev	Men's shot put F37	16.37	1st place, gold medalist(s)
Kudratillokhon Marufkhujaev	Men's discus throw F37	46.79	9
Tolibboy Yuldashev	Men's shot put F37	15.24	3rd place, bronze medalist(s)
Tolibboy Yuldashev	Men's discus throw F37	57.28	1st place, gold medalist(s)
Bobirjon Omonov	Men's shot put F41	14.32	1st place, gold medalist(s)
Yorkinbek Odilov	Men's javelin throw F57	50.32	1st place, gold medalist(s)
Yorkinbek Odilov	Men's shot put F57	12.95	8
Mukhammad Rikhsimov	Men's shot put F63	13.69	6

Women

Athlete	Event	Qualification		Final	
Athlete	Event	Distance	Rank	Distance	Rank
Asila Mirzayorova	Women's long jump T11	—N/a		5.24	1st place, gold medalist(s)
Yokutkhon Kholbekova	Women's long jump T12	—N/a		3.43	9
Safiya Burkhanova	Women's shot put F12	—N/a		14.12	2nd place, silver medalist(s)
Maxliyo Akramova	Women's club throw F32	—N/a		20.78	7
Dilafruzkhon Akhmatkhonova	Women's shot put F35	—N/a		8.98	5
Madina Mukhtorova	Women's shot put F41	—N/a		8.10	8
Madina Mukhtorova	Women's discus throw F41	—N/a		19.77	11
Kubaro Khakimova	Women's shot put F41	—N/a		10.36	2nd place, silver medalist(s)
Kubaro Khakimova	Women's discus throw F41	—N/a		25.19	9
Roziyakhon Ergasheva	Women's shot put F46	—N/a		9.96	9
Roziyakhon Ergasheva	Women's javelin throw F46	—N/a		35.98	9
Shahinakhon Yigitalieva	Women's shot put F46	—N/a		9.32	12
Shahinakhon Yigitalieva	Women's javelin throw F46	—N/a		43.12	2nd place, silver medalist(s)
Nurkhon Kurbanova	Women's shot put F54	—N/a		7.75	3rd place, bronze medalist(s)
Nurkhon Kurbanova	Women's discus throw F55	—N/a		17.26	11
Nurkhon Kurbanova	Women's javelin throw F54	—N/a		21.12 WR	1st place, gold medalist(s)
Natalya Semyonova	Women's discus throw F55	—N/a		13.48	12
Natalya Semyonova	Women's javelin throw F56	17.00	2 q	16.96	9
Mokhigul Khamdamova	Women's discus throw F57	—N/a		32.75	3rd place, bronze medalist(s)
Mokhigul Khamdamova	Women's shot put F57	—N/a		9.52	7

== Cycling ==
Uzbekistan entered one male para-cyclist after finished the top eligible nation's at the 2022 UCI Nation's ranking allocation ranking.

=== Road ===
Men

Athlete	Event	Time	Rank
Golibbek Mirzoyarov	Men's road race C1-3	1:59:17	21
Golibbek Mirzoyarov	Men's time trial C2	21:46.11	7
Azimbek Abdullaev	Men's road race C4-5	DNF	
Azimbek Abdullaev	Men's time trial C5	41:23.64	10

=== Track ===
Men

Athlete	Event	Qualification		Final	
Athlete	Event	Time	Rank	Time	Rank
Golibbek Mirzoyarov	Men's pursuit C2	3:52.446	6	Did not advance	
Golibbek Mirzoyarov	Men's time trial C1-3	1:16.163	15	Did not advance	
Azimbek Abdullaev	Men's pursuit C5	4:43.555	12	Did not advance	
Azimbek Abdullaev	Men's time trial C4-5	1:10.826	21	Did not advance	

== Judo ==
Athlete	Event	Round of 16	Quarterfinals	Semifinals	Repechage	Final / BM	
Athlete	Event	Opposition Result	Opposition Result	Opposition Result	Opposition Result	Opposition Result	Rank
Turgun Abdiev	Men's 90 Kg J1	Bye	Cavalcante (BRA); L 0-10	—N/a	Teodori (ITA); W 10-0	Jonard (FRA); L 0-10	=5
Shokhrukh Mamedov	Men's 73 Kg J1	Suranov (KGZ); W 10–01	Bologa (ROM); L 00–10	—N/a	Camanni (ITA); W 10–00	Sass (GER); L 00–10	=5
Sherzod Namozov	Men's 60 Kg J2	Bye	Gavilán (ESP); W 10–00	Lee (KOR); W 10–00	—N/a	Zurabiani (GEO); W 01–00	1st place, gold medalist(s)
Uchkun Kuranbaev	Men's 73 Kg J2	Kornhass (GER); W 10-0	Petit (FRA); W 10-0	Kaldani (GEO); L 0-10	—N/a	Kim (KOR); W 1-0	3rd place, bronze medalist(s)
Davurkhon Karomatov	Men's 90 Kg J2	Bye	Goral (GER); W 11-0	Nazarenko (UKR); L 0-10	—N/a	Kizilashvili (GEO); W 10-0	3rd place, bronze medalist(s)
Uljon Amrieva	Women's 57 kg J1	Bye	Shi (CHN); L 00–10	—N/a	Oliveira (BRA); W 11–01	Havrysiuk (UKR); L 00–10	=5
Feruza Ergasheva	Women's +70 kg J1	Bye	Harnyk (UKR); L 0-10	—N/a	Tampubolon (INA); W 10-0	Güneş (TUR); L 0-10	=5
Kumushkhon Khodjaeva	Women's 57 kg J2	Bye	Wang (CHN); W 10–0	Arce (ESP); W 1–0	—N/a	Hirose (JPN); L 0-10	2nd place, silver medalist(s)

== Paracanoeing ==
Uzbekistan earned quota places for the following events through the 2023 ICF Canoe Sprint World Championships in Duisburg, Germany; and 2024 ICF Canoe Sprint World Championships in Szeged, Hungary.

Men

Athlete	Event	Heats		Semifinal		Final	
Athlete	Event	Time	Rank	Time	Rank	Time	Rank
Azizbek Abdulkhabibov	KL2						
Khasan Kuldashev	KL3						
Khaytmurot Sherkuziev	VL3						

Women

Athlete	Event	Heats		Semifinal		Final	
Athlete	Event	Time	Rank	Time	Rank	Time	Rank
Shakhnoza Mirzaeva	KL3						
Irodakhon Rustamova	VL2						
Shakhzoda Mamadalieva	VL3						

== Powerlifting ==
Athlete	Event	Attempts (kg)				Result (kg)	Rank
Athlete	Event	1	2	3	4	Result (kg)	Rank
Bekzod Jamilov	Men's 72 kg						
Khusniddin Usmanov	Men's 88 kg						
Ilkhom Khalimov	Men's 107 kg						
Akitakhon Akhtamova	Women's 50 kg						
Ruza Kuzieva	Women's 73 kg						
Rukhshona Uktamova	Women's 61 kg						
Durdona Turaeva	Women's 55 kg						
Kudratoy Toshpulatova	Women's 67 kg						

== Rowing ==
Uzbekistani rowers qualified boats in each of the following classes at the 2023 World Rowing Championships in Belgrade, Serbia; and 2024 Final Paralympic Qualification Regatta in Lucerne, Switzerland.

Athlete	Event	Heats		Repechage		Final	
Athlete	Event	Time	Rank	Time	Rank	Time	Rank
Mukhayyo Abdusattorova	PR1 women's single sculls	11:22.19	5 R	11:25.27	4 FB		

Qualification Legend: FA=Final A (medal); FB=Final B (non-medal); R=Repechage

== Shooting ==
Uzbekistan entered two para-shooter's after achieved quota places for the following events by virtue of their best finishes at the 2022, 2023 and 2024 world cup, 2022 World Championships, 2023 World Championships and 2022 Asian Para Games, as long as they obtained a minimum qualifying score (MQS) by May 31, 2020.

Men

Athlete	Event	Qualification		Final	
Athlete	Event	Points	Rank	Points	Rank
Server Ibragimov	P1 Men's 10 m air pistol SH1				

Women

Athlete	Event	Qualification		Final	
Athlete	Event	Points	Rank	Points	Rank
Shaknoza Mamajonova	P2 Women's 10 m air pistol SH1				

Mixed

Athlete	Event	Qualification		Final	
Athlete	Event	Points	Rank	Points	Rank
Server Ibragimov	P4 Mixed 50 metre pistol SH1				
Shakhnoza Mamajonova	P4 Mixed 50 metre pistol SH1				

== Swimming ==
Uzbekistan entered five swimmers (four men and one woman), by virtue of the results at the 2023 World Para Swimming Championships after finishing in the top two places in Paralympic class disciplines; and through the Minimum Qualification Standard (MQS) allocation slots.

Men

Athlete	Events	Heats		Final	
Athlete	Events	Time	Rank	Time	Rank
Islam Asanov	50 m freestyle S13				
Islam Asanov	100 m backstroke S13				
Islam Asanov	100 m butterfly S13				
Muzaffar Tursunkhujaev	50 m freestyle S13				
Muzaffar Tursunkhujaev	400 m freestyle S13				
Muzaffar Tursunkhujaev	100 m backstroke S13				
Muzaffar Tursunkhujaev	100 m butterfly S13				
Muzaffar Tursunkhujaev	200 m individual medley SM13				
Kirill Pankov	50 m freestyle S13				
Kirill Pankov	100 m backstroke S13				
Kirill Pankov	100 m butterfly S13				
Firdavsbek Musabekov	400 m freestyle S13				
Firdavsbek Musabekov	100 m breaststroke SB13				
Firdavsbek Musabekov	200 m individual medley SM13				

Women

Athlete	Events	Heats		Final	
Athlete	Events	Time	Rank	Time	Rank
Muslima Odilova	100 m butterfly S13				

== Taekwondo ==
Uzbekistan entered five athletes to compete at the Paralympics competition. All of them qualified for Paris 2024, by virtue of finishing within the top six in the Paralympic rankings in their respective class.

Men

Athlete	Event	First round	Quarterfinals	Semifinals	Repechage 1	Repechage 2	Final / BM	
Athlete	Event	Opposition Result	Opposition Result	Opposition Result	Opposition Result	Opposition Result	Opposition Result	Rank
Zukhriddin Tokhirov	–63 kg	Adouich (MAR); L 15-17	Did not advance					
Javokhir Alikulov	–70 kg	Bye	López (MEX); W 5-4	Khalilov (AZE); L 2-7	—N/a		Samorano (ARG); L 5-6	5
Asadbek Toshtemirov	–80 kg	Bye	Molina (CRC); W 22-5	Bakht (IRI); W 18-12	—N/a		Nájera (MEX); W 38-17	1st place, gold medalist(s)

Women

Athlete	Event	First round	Quarterfinals	Semifinals	Repechage 1	Repechage 2	Final / BM	
Athlete	Event	Opposition Result	Opposition Result	Opposition Result	Opposition Result	Opposition Result	Opposition Result	Rank
Ziyodakhon Isakova	–47 kg	Bye	Khudadadi (RPT); W 4-3	Phuangkitcha (THA); W 5-3	—N/a		Espinoza (PER); L 4-10	2nd place, silver medalist(s)
Guljonoy Naimova	+65 kg	Bye	Papastamatopoulou (GRE); W 12-5	Menezes (BRA); W 9-3	—N/a		Truesdale (GBR); L2-8	2nd place, silver medalist(s)

== See also ==
- Uzbekistan at the 2024 Summer Olympics
- Uzbekistan at the Paralympics
