= 2024 European Taekwondo Championships =

- Venue: Belgrade Fair – Hall 1
- Location: (Serbia) Belgrade
- Dates: 9–12 May

Champion
- Croatia
- Men: TBA
- Women: TBA

The 2024 European Taekwondo Championships, the 26th edition of the European Taekwondo Championships, was held in Belgrade, Serbia at the Belgrade Fair – Hall 1 from 9 to 12 May 2024.

== Medal table ==
* Host nation (Serbia)

Rank	Nation	Gold	Silver	Bronze	Total
1	Croatia	3	0	4	7
2	Turkey	2	5	1	8
3	Great Britain	2	2	2	6
4	Spain	2	1	1	4
–	Individual Neutral Athletes	1	1	2	4
5	France	1	1	0	2
6	Germany	1	0	2	3
6	Hungary	1	0	2	3
8	Belgium	1	0	0	1
8	Bulgaria	1	0	0	1
8	Italy	1	0	0	1
11	Ukraine	0	1	5	6
12	Greece	0	1	3	4
13	Bosnia and Herzegovina	0	1	2	3
13	Serbia*	0	1	2	3
15	Georgia	0	1	0	1
15	Norway	0	1	0	1
17	Azerbaijan	0	0	2	2
18	Czech Republic	0	0	1	1
18	Denmark	0	0	1	1
18	Latvia	0	0	1	1
18	Poland	0	0	1	1
Totals (21 entries)		16	16	32	64

== Medal summary ==
=== Men ===
Event	Gold	Silver	Bronze
54 kg	Furkan Ubeyde Çamoğlu; Turkey	Konstantinos Dimitropoulos; Greece	Josip Teskera; Croatia
54 kg	Furkan Ubeyde Çamoğlu; Turkey	Konstantinos Dimitropoulos; Greece	Maksym Manenkov; Ukraine
58 kg	Vito Dell'Aquila; Italy	Lev Korneev; Serbia	Gashim Magomedov; Azerbaijan
58 kg	Vito Dell'Aquila; Italy	Lev Korneev; Serbia	Adrián Vicente; Spain
63 kg	Omar Salim; Hungary	Hakan Reçber; Turkey	Volodymyr Bystrov; Ukraine
63 kg	Omar Salim; Hungary	Hakan Reçber; Turkey	Tobias Hyttel; Denmark
68 kg	Bradly Sinden; Great Britain	Ilia Danilov; Individual Neutral Athletes	Simur Mirzoiev; Ukraine
68 kg	Bradly Sinden; Great Britain	Ilia Danilov; Individual Neutral Athletes	Levente Józsa; Hungary
74 kg	Daniel Quesada; Spain	Zurab Kintsurashvili; Georgia	Javad Aghayev; Azerbaijan
74 kg	Daniel Quesada; Spain	Zurab Kintsurashvili; Georgia	Charalampos Flouskounis; Greece
80 kg	Toni Kanaet; Croatia	Kostiantyn Kostenevych; Ukraine	Nedžad Husić; Bosnia and Herzegovina
80 kg	Toni Kanaet; Croatia	Kostiantyn Kostenevych; Ukraine	Maksim Khramtsov; Individual Neutral Athletes
87 kg	Enbiya Taha Biçer; Turkey	Richard Ordemann; Norway	Vasileios Tholiotis; Greece
87 kg	Enbiya Taha Biçer; Turkey	Richard Ordemann; Norway	Artem Harbar; Ukraine
+87 kg	Caden Cunningham; Great Britain	Iván García; Spain	Krystian Haremza; Poland
+87 kg	Caden Cunningham; Great Britain	Iván García; Spain	Emre Kutalmış Ateşli; Turkey

=== Women ===
Event	Gold	Silver	Bronze
46 kg	Lena Stojković; Croatia	Džejla Makaš; Bosnia and Herzegovina	Viktoriia Nahurna; Ukraine
46 kg	Lena Stojković; Croatia	Džejla Makaš; Bosnia and Herzegovina	Phoenix Goodman; Great Britain
49 kg	Adriana Cerezo; Spain	Merve Dinçel; Turkey	Supharada Kisskalt; Germany
49 kg	Adriana Cerezo; Spain	Merve Dinçel; Turkey	Bruna Duvančić; Croatia
53 kg	Tatiana Minina; Individual Neutral Athletes	Zeynep Taşkın; Turkey	Andrea Bokan; Serbia
53 kg	Tatiana Minina; Individual Neutral Athletes	Zeynep Taşkın; Turkey	Ada Avdagić; Bosnia and Herzegovina
57 kg	Nika Karabatić; Croatia	Jade Jones; Great Britain	Luana Márton; Hungary
57 kg	Nika Karabatić; Croatia	Jade Jones; Great Britain	Fani Tzeli; Greece
62 kg	Kimia Alizadeh; Bulgaria	Aaliyah Powell; Great Britain	Ivana Arelić; Croatia
62 kg	Kimia Alizadeh; Bulgaria	Aaliyah Powell; Great Britain	Petra Štolbová; Czech Republic
67 kg	Sarah Chaâri; Belgium	Magda Wiet-Hénin; France	Aleksandra Perišić; Serbia
67 kg	Sarah Chaâri; Belgium	Magda Wiet-Hénin; France	Jolanta Tarvida; Latvia
73 kg	Althéa Laurin; France	Sude Yaren Uzunçavdar; Turkey	Matea Jelić; Croatia
73 kg	Althéa Laurin; France	Sude Yaren Uzunçavdar; Turkey	Yanna Schneider; Germany
+73 kg	Lorena Brandl; Germany	Nafia Kuş; Turkey	Kristina Adebaio; Individual Neutral Athletes
+73 kg	Lorena Brandl; Germany	Nafia Kuş; Turkey	Rebecca McGowan; Great Britain

== Para Taekwondo ==
=== Medal table ===
* Host nation (Serbia)

Rank	Nation	Gold	Silver	Bronze	Total
1	Mongolia	2	0	0	2
2	Turkey	1	4	3	8
–	Individual Neutral Athletes	1	1	4	6
3	Azerbaijan	1	1	0	2
3	Greece	1	1	0	2
5	Great Britain	1	0	2	3
6	Israel	1	0	1	2
7	South Korea	1	0	0	1
7	Thailand	1	0	0	1
9	France	0	2	0	2
10	United States	0	1	0	1
11	Georgia	0	0	3	3
12	Poland	0	0	2	2
12	Spain	0	0	2	2
14	Hungary	0	0	1	1
14	Morocco	0	0	1	1
14	Serbia*	0	0	1	1
Totals (16 entries)		10	10	20	40

=== Medal summary ===
==== Men ====
Event	Class	Gold	Silver	Bronze
K44	58 kg	Asaf Yasur; Israel	Ali Can Özcan; Turkey	Joel Martín; Spain
K44	58 kg	Asaf Yasur; Israel	Ali Can Özcan; Turkey	Askhat Akmatov; Individual Neutral Athletes
K44	63 kg	Ganbatyn Bolor-Erdene; Mongolia	Mahmut Bozteke; Turkey	Daniil Sidorov; Individual Neutral Athletes
K44	63 kg	Ganbatyn Bolor-Erdene; Mongolia	Mahmut Bozteke; Turkey	Adnan Milad; Israel
K44	70 kg	Imamaddin Khalilov; Azerbaijan	Fatih Çelik; Turkey	Giorgi Nikoladze; Georgia
K44	70 kg	Imamaddin Khalilov; Azerbaijan	Fatih Çelik; Turkey	Maciej Kęsicki; Poland
K44	80 kg	Joo Jeong-hun; South Korea	Abulfaz Abuzarli; Azerbaijan	Nikola Spajić; Serbia
K44	80 kg	Joo Jeong-hun; South Korea	Abulfaz Abuzarli; Azerbaijan	Joseph Lane; Great Britain
K44	+80 kg	Aliaskhab Ramazanov; Individual Neutral Athletes	Evan Medell; United States	Zoltán Kiss; Hungary
K44	+80 kg	Aliaskhab Ramazanov; Individual Neutral Athletes	Evan Medell; United States	Matt Bush; Great Britain

==== Women ====
Event	Class	Gold	Silver	Bronze
K44	47 kg	Khwansuda Phuangkitcha; Thailand	Dzhetsun-Sholbana Kara-ool; Individual Neutral Athletes	Lia Chachibaia; Georgia
K44	47 kg	Khwansuda Phuangkitcha; Thailand	Dzhetsun-Sholbana Kara-ool; Individual Neutral Athletes	Nurcihan Ekinci; Turkey
K44	52 kg	Ulambayaryn Sürenjav; Mongolia	Meryem Betül Çavdar; Turkey	Lütfiye Özdağ; Turkey
K44	52 kg	Ulambayaryn Sürenjav; Mongolia	Meryem Betül Çavdar; Turkey	Anna Poddubskaia; Individual Neutral Athletes
K44	57 kg	Gamze Gürdal; Turkey	Sophie Caverzan; France	Nata Ochigava; Georgia
K44	57 kg	Gamze Gürdal; Turkey	Sophie Caverzan; France	Sümeyye Özcan; Turkey
K44	65 kg	Christina Gkentzou; Greece	Djelika Diallo; France	Elena Savinskaya; Individual Neutral Athletes
K44	65 kg	Christina Gkentzou; Greece	Djelika Diallo; France	Patrycja Zewar; Poland
K44	+65 kg	Amy Truesdale; Great Britain	Eleni Papastamatopoulou; Greece	Rajae Akermach; Morocco
K44	+65 kg	Amy Truesdale; Great Britain	Eleni Papastamatopoulou; Greece	Dalia Santiago; Spain
