= Büşra Emire =

Turkish para taekwondo practitioner (born 2005)

Personal information
- Born: 3 August 2005 (age 21) Bor, Niğde, Turkey

Sport
- Sport: Para Taekwondo
- Disability class: K44
Medal record
Women's Para Taekwondo
Representing Turkey
European Championships
Bronze medal – third place	2026 Munich	K44 -47
European Para Championships
Bronze medal – third place	2021 Istanbul	K44 -47
Tournaments
Bronze medal – third place	2025 Tai'an	K44 -47
European Para Youth Games
Silver medal – second place	2025 Istanbul	K44 -47

Büşra Emire (born 3 August 2005) is a Turkish Para Taekwondo practitioner who competes in the K44 disability class of -47 kg.

== Sport career ==
Emire, a disabled girl missing her left arm from birth, started performing taekwondo at the age of ten with the encouragement of her parents and the support of her school teacher. After hard trainings and success at competitions, she was included into the girls' national para taekwondo team of her age group. She overcame the disadvantage of having one arm only with the tactics of her coach.

At the 2021 European Para Taekwondo Championships in Istanbul, Turkey, she won a bronze medal.

She took a bronze medal at the 2025 WT President's Cup Asia Para Taekwondo (G3 and G2 level) tournament in Tai'an, China.

In April, 2026, she took part at the national team selection held in Ankara for the upcoming European Para Taekwondo Championships. Competing in the Kyorugi category, she was included in the national team. She won the silver medal at the 2025 European Para Youth Games in Istanbul, Turkey. At the 2026 European Championships in Munich, Germany, she lost the semifinals to her countrywoman Nurcihan Ekinci, and took a bronze medal.

== Personal life ==
Büşra Emire was born, missing her left arm, to Hurşit and Tülay Emire in Bor, Niğde, Turkey on 3 August 2005. She has one sibling.
