= Çelik =

Çelik, meaning "steel" in Turkish, is a Turkish given name and surname. It may refer to:

== Given name ==
- Çelik Erişçi (born 1966), Turkish singer-songwriter
- Çelik Gülersoy (1930–2003), Turkish lawyer and long-time president of Touring and Automobile Club of Turkey

== Surname ==
- Alparslan Çelik (born 1982), Turkish member of the Syrian Turkmen Brigades
- Burcu Çelik Özkan (born 1986), Turkish politician
- Fatih Çelik (born 1992), Turkish Para Taekwondo practitioner
- Fırat Çelik (born 1981), Turkish-German actor
- Gülderen Çelik (born 1980), Turkish female karateka
- Hüseyin Çelik (born 1959), Turkish politician
- Metin Çelik (born 1970), Turkish-Dutch politician
- Nurcan Çelik (1980–2026), Turkish footballer and football club owner
- Ömer Çelik (born 1968), Turkish politician and government minister
- Pelin Çelik (born 1982), Turkish female volleyball player
- Recep Çelik (born 1983), Turkish racewalker
- Sanem Çelik (born 1975), Turkish actress
- Tantek Çelik, Turkish-American computer scientist
- Tarık Çelik (born 1996), American Twitch streamer
- Tuana Çelik (born 2008), Turkish female para taekwondo practitioner
- Yasin Çelik (born 1975), Turkish footballer
- Zeki Çelik (born 1997), Turkish footballer
- Zeynep Çelik (born 1996), Turkish female para judoka
