= Taekwondo at the 2023 European Para Championships =

- Venue: Rotterdam Ahoy
- Location: Rotterdam, Netherlands
- Start date: 14 August
- End date: 16 August

Taekwondo at the 2023 European Para Championships in Rotterdam, Netherlands was held between 14 and 16 August. There were five men's events and five women's events in the K44 class, and two men's events in the K41 class.

The athletes could gain points in their respective sport category ranking list for the 2024 Summer Paralympics.

== Medal table ==
* Host nation (Netherlands)

Rank	Nation	Gold	Silver	Bronze	Total
1	Turkey	4	3	3	10
2	Azerbaijan	2	1	2	5
3	Great Britain	1	2	2	5
4	Serbia	1	2	0	3
5	Croatia	1	0	0	1
5	Refugee Team	1	0	0	1
7	Israel	0	2	0	2
8	Georgia	0	0	5	5
9	Spain	0	0	2	2
9	Ukraine	0	0	2	2
11	France	0	0	1	1
11	Poland	0	0	1	1
Totals (12 entries)		10	10	18	38

== Medalists ==
-80 kg K41 : George Khizanishvil Goga Khakhalashvili only 2 from GEO

=== Men ===
Event	Gold	Silver	Bronze
Men's –58kg K44	Ali Can Özcan; Turkey	Asaf Yasur; Israel	Sabir Zeynalov; Azerbaijan
Men's –58kg K44	Ali Can Özcan; Turkey	Asaf Yasur; Israel	Joel Martín Villalobos; Spain
Men's –63kg K44	Mahmut Bozteke; Turkey	Adnan Milad; Israel	Amin shikhaliyev Azerbaijan
Men's –63kg K44	Mahmut Bozteke; Turkey	Adnan Milad; Israel	Sandro Megrelishvili; Georgia
Men's –63kg K41	George Khizanishvil; Georgia	Goga Khakhalashvili; Georgia	
Men's –70kg K44	Imamaddin Khalilov; Azerbaijan	Fatih Çelik; Turkey	Maciej Kesicki; Poland
Men's –70kg K44	Imamaddin Khalilov; Azerbaijan	Fatih Çelik; Turkey	Giorgi Nikoladze; Georgia
Men's –80kg K44	Abulfaz Abuzarli; Azerbaijan	Nikola Spajić; Serbia	Joseph Lane; Great Britain
Men's –80kg K44	Abulfaz Abuzarli; Azerbaijan	Nikola Spajić; Serbia	Oktay Atalay; Turkey
Men's –80kg K41	Andrei Sleptsov; Georgia	Gela Zarkua; Georgia	
Men's +80kg K44	Ivan Mikulić; Croatia	Matt Bush; Great Britain	David Makadze; Georgia
Men's +80kg K44	Ivan Mikulić; Croatia	Matt Bush; Great Britain	Mehmet Sami Saraç; Turkey

=== Women ===
Event	Gold	Silver	Bronze
Women's –47kg K44	Zakia Khudadadi; International Paralympic Committee	Nurcihan Ekinci; Turkey	Viktoriia Marchuk; Ukraine
Women's –47kg K44	Zakia Khudadadi; International Paralympic Committee	Nurcihan Ekinci; Turkey	Lia Chachibaia; Georgia
Women's –52kg K44	Meryem Betül Çavdar; Turkey	Royala Fataliyeva; Azerbaijan	Keira Forsythe; Great Britain
Women's –52kg K44	Meryem Betül Çavdar; Turkey	Royala Fataliyeva; Azerbaijan	Ana Japaridze; Georgia
Women's –57kg K44	Gamze Gürdal; Turkey	Marija Mičev; Serbia	Sophie Caverzan; France
Women's –57kg K44	Gamze Gürdal; Turkey	Marija Mičev; Serbia	Yuliya Lypetska; Ukraine
Women's –65kg K44	Beth Munro; Great Britain	Lütfiye Özdağ; Turkey	Seçil Er; Turkey
Women's +65kg K44	Jelena Rašić; Serbia	Amy Truesdale; Great Britain	Dalia Santiago Moreno; Spain
