= Nurlan Dombayev =

Kazakhkstani parataekwondo practitioner (born 1981)

Personal information
- Nationality: Kazakhstan
- Born: 15 August 1981 (age 44) Atyrau, Kazakh SSR, Soviet Union

Sport
- Country: Kazakhstan
- Sport: Para Taekwondo
- Disability class: F44
- Weight class: -75 kg, -80 kg
Medal record
Men's Para Taekwondo
Representing Kazakhstan
World Championships
Gold medal – first place	2017 London	-75 kg
Gold medal – first place	2019 Antalya	-75 kg
Bronze medal – third place	2021 Istanbul	-80 kg
European Championships
Bronze medal – third place	2021 Istanbul	-80 kg
Asian Para Games
Bronze medal – third place	2022 Hangzhou	-80 kg

Nurlan Dombayev (born 15 August 1981) is a Kazakhstani para-taekwondo practitioner who competes in the F44 classification. Having competed in the -75 and later -80 kg category, he is a gold medalist at the 2017 and 2019 World Para Taekwondo Championships, and a bronze medalist at the 2021 European Para Taekwondo Championships and 2022 Asian Para Games.

== Early life ==
Dombayev was born in Atyrau, Atyrau Region on 15 August 1981.

== Career ==
In the 2017 and 2019 World Championships Dombayev won the gold medal, both in the 75 kg category.

On 3 September 2021, at the men's 75 kg event at the 2020 Summer Paralympics in Tokyo, Japan, Dombayev was eliminated by Mahdi Pourrahnama in the semifinals. He then lost to Juan Samorano in a bronze medal match. On 23 September, at the 2021 European Para Taekwondo Championships, Dombayev won a bronze medal.

At the 2022 Asian Para Games in October 2023, Dombayev won a bronze medal. At the World Championships in September 2023, he was eliminated by Joo Jeong-hun in the quarterfinals.
