= Taekwondo at the 2020 Summer Paralympics – Men's 61 kg =

Taekwondo – Men's 61 kg K44 at the XVI Paralympic Games
- Venue: Makuhari Messe Hall B
- Date: 2 September 2021
- Competitors: 12 from 12 nations

Medalists
1st place, gold medalist(s)		Nathan Torquato	Brazil
2nd place, silver medalist(s)		Mohamed El-Zayat	Egypt
3rd place, bronze medalist(s)		Mahmut Bozteke	Turkey
3rd place, bronze medalist(s)		Daniil Sidorov	RPC

The men's 61 kg taekwondo competition at the 2020 Summer Paralympics was held on 2 September 2021 at the Makuhari Messe Hall B.

== Results ==
=== Bracket ===
Round of 16
Zukhriddin Tokhirov (UZB)	30
Antonino Bossolo (ITA)	64
Nathan Torquato (BRA)	27
Parfait Hakizimana (RPT)	4
Mohamed El-Zayat (EGY)	17
Alejandro Vidal (ESP)	11
Daniil Sidorov (RPC)	25
Imamaddin Khalilov (AZE)	19

Quarterfinals
Ganbatyn Bolor-Erdene (MGL)	28
Antonino Bossolo (ITA)	40
Nathan Torquato (BRA)	58
Mitsuya Tanaka (JPN)	24
Bopha Kong (FRA)	10
Mohamed El-Zayat (EGY)	20
Daniil Sidorov (RPC)	26
Mahmut Bozteke (TUR)	21

Semifinals
Antonino Bossolo (ITA)	34
Nathan Torquato (BRA)	37
Mohamed El-Zayat (EGY)	RSC
Daniil Sidorov (RPC)

Final
Nathan Torquato (BRA)	RSC
Mohamed El-Zayat (EGY)

=== Repechage ===
Repechage 1
Parfait Hakizimana (RPT)
Mahmut Bozteke (TUR)	WWD
Alejandro Vidal (ESP)	11
Ganbatyn Bolor-Erdene (MGL)	31

Repechage 2
Mahmut Bozteke (TUR)	23
Ganbatyn Bolor-Erdene (MGL)	22

Bronze medal
Antonino Bossolo (ITA)	2
Mahmut Bozteke (TUR)	14

Repechage 1
Zukhriddin Tokhirov (UZB)	24
Bopha Kong (FRA)	37
Imamaddin Khalilov (AZE)	20
Mitsuya Tanaka (JPN)	15

Repechage 2
Bopha Kong (FRA)	29
Imamaddin Khalilov (AZE)	26

Bronze medal
Daniil Sidorov (RPC)	33
Bopha Kong (FRA)	23
