= Mohamed El-Zayat =

Egyptian para taekwondo practitioner

Personal information
- Born: 1 April 2001 (age 25)

Sport
- Country: Egypt
- Sport: Para taekwondo
Medal record
Representing Egypt
Paralympic Games
Silver medal – second place	2020 Tokyo	61 kg

Mohamed El-Zayat (born 1 April 2001) is an Egyptian para taekwondo practitioner. He won the silver medal in the men's 61 kg event at the 2020 Summer Paralympics in Tokyo, Japan. He received a kick to the head in his semi-final match against Daniil Sidorov. El-Zayat advanced to the final but he was unable to compete due to his injuries and, as a result, Nathan Torquato was awarded the gold medal.
