= Taekwondo at the 2024 Summer Paralympics – Men's 80 kg =

Taekwondo – Men's 80 kg K44 at the XVII Paralympic Games
- Venue: Grand Palais, Paris
- Date: 31 August 2024
- Competitors: 13 from 13 nations

Medalists
1st place, gold medalist(s)		Asadbek Toshtemirov	Uzbekistan
2nd place, silver medalist(s)		Luis Mario Nájera	Mexico
3rd place, bronze medalist(s)		Alireza Bakht	Iran
3rd place, bronze medalist(s)		Joo Jeong-hun	South Korea

The men's 80 kg taekwondo competition at the 2024 Summer Paralympics was held on 31 August 2024 at the Grand Palais, Paris. 13 athletes took part.

== Results ==
Preliminary Round

31 August, South Paris Arena

Allain Ganapin (PHI)	22
Hadi Hassanzada (RPT)	13

Bracket

Round of 16
31 August, South Paris Arena
Nikola Spajić (SRB)	20
Claro Lopes (BRA)	5
31 August, South Paris Arena
Abulfaz Abuzarli (AZE)	12
Allain Ganapin (PHI)	9
31 August, South Paris Arena
Nurlan Dombayev (KAZ)	12
Rachid Ismaili (MAR)	7
31 August, South Paris Arena
Elliott Loonstra (ARU)	10
Andrees Molina (CRC)	12

Quarter-finals
31 August, South Paris Arena
Nikola Spajić (SRB)	1
Joo Jeong-hun (KOR)	8
31 August, South Paris Arena
Abulfaz Abuzarli (AZE)	3
Luis Mario Nájera (MEX)	6
31 August, South Paris Arena
Nurlan Dombayev (KAZ)	5
Alireza Bakht (IRI)	7
31 August, South Paris Arena
Andrees Molina (CRC)	5
Asadbek Toshtemirov (UZB)	22

Semi-finals
31 August, South Paris Arena
Joo Jeong-hun (KOR)	8
Luis Mario Nájera (MEX)	10
31 August, South Paris Arena
Alireza Bakht (IRI)	12
Asadbek Toshtemirov (UZB)	18

Gold medal match
31 August, South Paris Arena
Luis Mario Nájera (MEX)	17
Asadbek Toshtemirov (UZB)	38

Repechage

Repechage match
31 August, South Paris Arena
Nikola Spajić (SRB)	11
Abulfaz Abuzarli (AZE)	9

Bronze medal match
31 August, South Paris Arena
Nikola Spajić (SRB)	6
Alireza Bakht (IRI)	29

Repechage match
31 August, South Paris Arena
Nurlan Dombayev (KAZ)	18
Andrees Molina (CRC)	7

Bronze medal match
31 August, South Paris Arena
Nurlan Dombayev (KAZ)	1
Joo Jeong-hun (KOR)	7
