= Taekwondo at the 2024 Summer Paralympics – Men's 63 kg =

Taekwondo – Men's 63 kg K44 at the XVII Paralympic Games
- Venue: Grand Palais, Paris
- Date: 30 August 2024
- Competitors: 12 from 12 nations

Medalists
1st place, gold medalist(s)		Mahmut Bozteke	Turkey
2nd place, silver medalist(s)		Ganbatyn Bolor-Erdene	Mongolia
3rd place, bronze medalist(s)		Antonino Bossolo	Italy
3rd place, bronze medalist(s)		Ayoub Adouich	Morocco

The men's 63 kg taekwondo competition at the 2024 Summer Paralympics was held on 30 August 2024 at the Grand Palais, Paris. 12 athletes took part.

== Results ==
Key

- WDR = Withdrawn
- WWD = Win by Withdrawal

Bracket

Round of 16

Quarter-finals

Semi-finals

Gold medal match

30 August, South Paris Arena

Adnan Milad (ISR)
7

30 August, South Paris Arena

Mahmut Bozteke (TUR)
30

Lee Dongho (KOR)
12

30 August, South Paris Arena

Adnan Milad (ISR)
27

Mahmut Bozteke (TUR)
10

30 August, South Paris Arena

Nathan Torquato (BRA)
6

Saeid Sadeghianpour (IRI)
28

30 August, South Paris Arena

Solomon Jagiri (SOL)
2

Saeid Sadeghianpour (IRI)
10

Nathan Torquato (BRA)
22

30 August, South Paris Arena

Mahmut Bozteke (TUR)
9

Ganbatyn Bolor-Erdene (MGL)
7

30 August, South Paris Arena

Ayoub Adouich (MAR)
4

30 August, South Paris Arena

Antonino Bossolo (ITA)
17

Ayoub Adouich (MAR)
17

30 August, South Paris Arena

Zukhriddin Tokhirov (UZB)
15

Antonino Bossolo (ITA)
4

30 August, South Paris Arena

Ganbatyn Bolor-Erdene (MGL)
6

Geraldo Castro (DOM)
23

30 August, South Paris Arena

Eyad al Turayk (KSA)
9

Geraldo Castro (DOM)
5

Ganbatyn Bolor-Erdene (MGL)
19

Repechage

Repechage match
30 August, South Paris Arena
Adnan Milad (ISR)	WWD
Saeid Sadeghianpour (IRI)	WDR

Bronze medal match
30 August, South Paris Arena
Adnan Milad (ISR)	13
Antonino Bossolo (ITA)	18

Repechage match
30 August, South Paris Arena
Ayoub Adouich (MAR)	19
Geraldo Castro (DOM)	13

Bronze medal match
30 August, South Paris Arena
Ayoub Adouich (MAR)	WWD
Nathan Torquato (BRA)	WDR
