= 2026 European Taekwondo Championships =

- Venue: BMW Park München
- Location: (Germany) Munich
- Start date: 11 May 2026
- End date: 14 May 2026

Champion
- tbd

The 2026 European Taekwondo Championships, the 27th edition of the European Taekwondo Championships, was held in Munich, Germany, at the venue BMW Park München from 11 to 14 May 2026.

== Medal table ==
* Host nation (Germany)

Rank	Nation	Gold	Silver	Bronze	Total
1	Turkey	3	2	3	8
2	Belarus	3	0	1	4
3	Hungary	2	1	2	5
4	Serbia	1	1	1	3
5	Greece	1	0	4	5
6	Great Britain	1	0	3	4
7	Poland	1	0	1	2
8	Belgium	1	0	0	1
8	Norway	1	0	0	1
10	Spain	0	3	0	3
11	Ukraine	0	2	1	3
12	Croatia	0	1	2	3
12	Italy	0	1	2	3
14	France	0	1	1	2
15	Bulgaria	0	1	0	1
16	Czech Republic	0	0	1	1
16	Germany*	0	0	1	1
16	Israel	0	0	1	1
16	Montenegro	0	0	1	1
Totals (19 entries)		14	13	25	52

== Medal summary ==
=== Men ===
Event	Gold	Silver	Bronze
54 kg	Jairo Agenjo Trigos; Spain	Gaetano Cirivello; Italy	Aristeidis Psarros; Greece
54 kg	Jairo Agenjo Trigos; Spain	Gaetano Cirivello; Italy	Hristiyan Georgiev; Bulgaria
58 kg	Georgii Gurtsiev; Belarus	Abderrahman Touiar; Italy	Enes Kaplan; Turkey
58 kg	Georgii Gurtsiev; Belarus	Abderrahman Touiar; Italy	Konstantinos Dimitropoulos; Greece
63 kg	Kristian Storsul Borgen; Norway	Cyrian Ravet; France	Ludovico Iurlaro; Italy
63 kg	Kristian Storsul Borgen; Norway	Cyrian Ravet; France	Omar Salim; Hungary
68 kg	Berkay Erer; Turkey	Volodymyr Bystrov; Ukraine	Dennis Baretta; Italy
68 kg	Berkay Erer; Turkey	Volodymyr Bystrov; Ukraine	Matthew Howell; Great Britain
74 kg	Stefan Takov; Serbia	Zurab Kintsurashvili; Georgia	Marko Golubić; Croatia
74 kg	Stefan Takov; Serbia	Zurab Kintsurashvili; Georgia	Javad Aghayev; Azerbaijan
80 kg	Raman Turavinau; Belarus	Kyrylo Hurnov; Ukraine	Leon Hrgota; Croatia
80 kg	Raman Turavinau; Belarus	Kyrylo Hurnov; Ukraine	Ioannis Papadopulos; Greece
87 kg	Szymon Piątkowski; Poland	Sergio Amoedo; Spain	Vasíleios Tholiotis; Greece
87 kg	Szymon Piątkowski; Poland	Sergio Amoedo; Spain	Artem Harbar; Ukraine
+87 kg	Caden Cunningham; Great Britain	Iván García; Spain	Artsiom Plonis; Belarus
+87 kg	Caden Cunningham; Great Britain	Iván García; Spain	Ivan Šapina; Croatia

=== Women ===
Event	Gold	Silver	Bronze
46 kg	Kamilah Salim; Hungary	Emine Göğebakan; Turkey	Rivka Bayech; Israel
46 kg	Kamilah Salim; Hungary	Emine Göğebakan; Turkey	Liliana Balla; Germany
49 kg	Elif Sude Akgül; Turkey	Andrea Bokan; Serbia	Adriana Cerezo; Spain
49 kg	Elif Sude Akgül; Turkey	Andrea Bokan; Serbia	Mah Teninba Fofana; France
53 kg	Merve Dinçel; Turkey	Erika Karabeleva; Bulgaria	Magdalini Klakala; Greece
53 kg	Merve Dinçel; Turkey	Erika Karabeleva; Bulgaria	Jodie Mckew; Great Britain
57 kg	Yuliya Vitko; Belarus	Nika Karabatić; Croatia	Luca Patakfalvy; Hungary
57 kg	Yuliya Vitko; Belarus	Nika Karabatić; Croatia	Hatice Kübra İlgün; Turkey
62 kg	Viviana Márton; Hungary	Elsa Secanell; Spain	Julia Szpak; Poland
62 kg	Viviana Márton; Hungary	Elsa Secanell; Spain	Petra Štolbová; Czech Republic
67 kg	Styliani Marentaki; Greece	Luana Márton; Hungary	Aleksandra Perišić; Serbia
67 kg	Styliani Marentaki; Greece	Luana Márton; Hungary	Andrea Berišaj; Montenegro
73 kg	Sarah Chaâri; Belgium	Sude Yaren Uzunçavdar; Turkey	Magda Wiet-Hénin; France
73 kg	Sarah Chaâri; Belgium	Sude Yaren Uzunçavdar; Turkey	Rebecca McGowan; Great Britain
+73 kg	Lorena Brandl; Germany	Lauren Williams; Great Britain	Nafia Kuş; Turkey
+73 kg	Lorena Brandl; Germany	Lauren Williams; Great Britain	Dagmara Haremza; Poland

== Para Taekwondo ==
=== Medal table ===
* Host nation (Germany)

Rank	Nation	Gold	Silver	Bronze	Total
Totals (0 entries)		0	0	0	0

=== Medal summary ===
==== Men ====
Event	Class	Gold	Silver	Bronze
70 kg	K41	Aziz Hanefi; Germany	Goga Khakhalashvili; Georgia	George Khizanishvili; Georgia
80 kg	K41	Andrei Sleptsov; Georgia	Zarkua Gela; Georgia	not awarded
58 kg	K44	Asaf Yasur; Israel	Sabir Zeynalov; Azerbaijan	Hamza Tarhan; Turkey
58 kg	K44	Asaf Yasur; Israel	Sabir Zeynalov; Azerbaijan	Ali Can Özcan; Turkey
63 kg	K44	Mahmut Bozteke; Turkey	Adnan Milad; Israel	Sandro Megrelishvili; Georgia
63 kg	K44	Mahmut Bozteke; Turkey	Adnan Milad; Israel	Joel Martin; Spain
70 kg	K44	Yusuf Yünaçtı; Turkey	Imamaddin Khalilov; Azerbaijan	Maciej Kęsicki; Poland
70 kg	K44	Yusuf Yünaçtı; Turkey	Imamaddin Khalilov; Azerbaijan	Giorgi Nikoladze; Georgia
80 kg	K44	Nikola Spajić; Serbia	Lasha Tkemaladze; Georgia	Marko Gračak; Croatia
80 kg	K44	Nikola Spajić; Serbia	Lasha Tkemaladze; Georgia	Emre Bulgur; Turkey
+80 kg	K44	Matt Bush; Great Britain	Ivan Mikulić; Croatia	Adem Arda Özkul; Turkey
+80 kg	K44	Matt Bush; Great Britain	Ivan Mikulić; Croatia	Osman Ertürk; Turkey

==== Women ====
Event	Class	Gold	Silver	Bronze
47 kg	K44	Zakia Khudadadi; France	Nurcihan Ekinci Gul; Turkey	Lia Chachibaia; Georgia
47 kg	K44	Zakia Khudadadi; France	Nurcihan Ekinci Gul; Turkey	Büşra Emire; Turkey
52 kg	K44	Ana Japaridze; Georgia	Meryem Betül Çavdar; Turkey	Marija Mičev; Serbia
52 kg	K44	Ana Japaridze; Georgia	Meryem Betül Çavdar; Turkey	Mariam Niniashvili; Georgia
57 kg	K44	Gamze Özcan; Turkey	Sophie Caverzan; France	Tuana Çelik; Turkey
57 kg	K44	Gamze Özcan; Turkey	Sophie Caverzan; France	Nata Ochigava; Georgia
65 kg	K44	Christina Gkentzou; Greece	Patrycja Zewar; Poland	Zehra Orhan; Turkey
65 kg	K44	Christina Gkentzou; Greece	Patrycja Zewar; Poland	Mariam Kenkebashvili; Georgia
+65 kg	K44	Amy Truesdale; Great Britain	Eleni Papastamatopoulou; Greece	Fatma Nur Yoldaş; Turkey
+65 kg	K44	Amy Truesdale; Great Britain	Eleni Papastamatopoulou; Greece	Jelena Rašić; Serbia
