= Sabir Zeynalov =

Azerbaijani parataekwondo practitioner (born 2005)

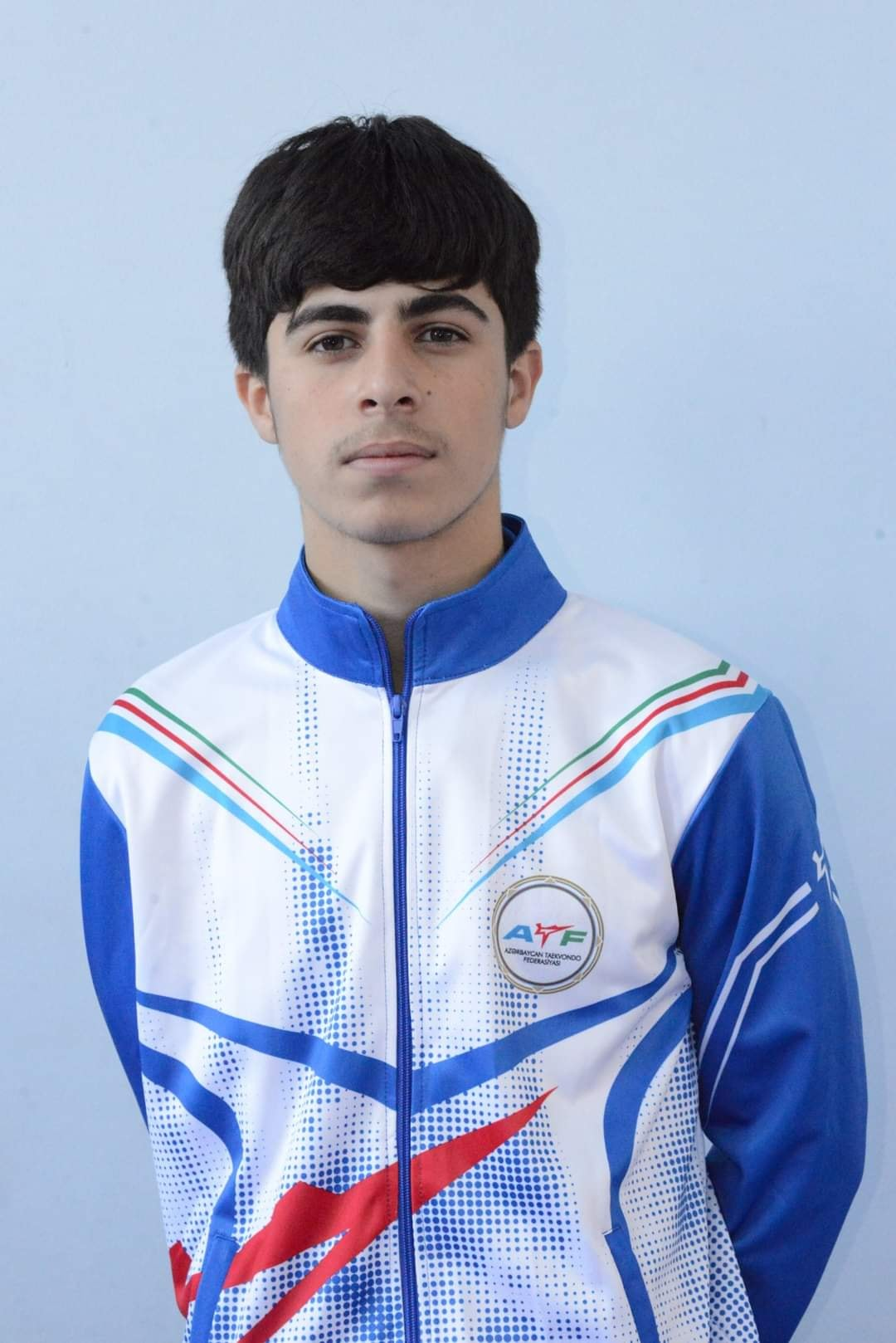

Personal information
- Nationality: Azerbaijani
- Born: 22 July 2005 (age 21)

Sport
- Sport: Para taekwondo
- Event: –58 kg
Medal record
Men's para taekwondo
Representing Azerbaijan
Summer Paralympics
Bronze medal – third place	2024 Paris	58 kg
World Championships
Gold medal – first place	2026 Muju	58 kg
Bronze medal – third place	2021 Istanbul	58 kg
European Championships
Silver medal – second place	2026 Munich	58 kg
Bronze medal – third place	2022 Manchester	58 kg
European Para Championships
Bronze medal – third place	2023 Rotterdam	58 kg
European Para Youth Games
Gold medal – first place	2025 Istanbul	58 kg

Sabir Zeynalov (born 22 July 2005) is an Azerbaijani para taekwondo practitioner. He represented Azerbaijan at the 2024 Summer Paralympics.

== Career ==
Zeynalov represented Azerbaijan at the 2024 Summer Paralympics and won a bronze medal in the 58 kg category.

By the decree of President Ilham Aliyev on 10 September 2024, Sabir Zeynalov was awarded 50,000 manats for securing third place at the 2024 Summer Paralympic Games, while his coach received 25,000 manats. In another decree issued on the same day, Zeynalov was also honored with the 3rd-degree Order for Service to the Fatherland.

In May 2026, he won a silver medal at the European Para Taekwondo Championship in Munich.

In July 2026, Sabir Zeynalov became a silver medalist of the open Challenge tournament held in the South Korean city of Chuncheon.

In November 2026, at the World Championship in Muju, Sabir Zeynalov won a gold medal in the 58 kg weight category.
