= Taekwondo at the 2024 Summer Paralympics – Men's 58 kg =

Taekwondo – Men's 58 kg K44 at the XVII Paralympic Games
- Venue: Grand Palais, Paris
- Date: 29 August 2024
- Competitors: 12 from 12 nations

Medalists
1st place, gold medalist(s)		Asaf Yasur	Israel
2nd place, silver medalist(s)		Ali Can Özcan	Turkey
3rd place, bronze medalist(s)		Sabir Zeynalov	Azerbaijan
3rd place, bronze medalist(s)		Xiao Xiang Wen	Chinese Taipei

The men's 58 kg taekwondo competition at the 2024 Summer Paralympics was held on 29 August 2024 at the Grand Palais in Paris. 12 athletes took part.

== Format ==
All the taekwondo events at the 2024 Paralympic Games are run as single elimination with a repechage system. The four highest ranked players at each weight class are given byes to the quarter final, the remaining players contest the round of 16.

The players that lose in the quarter-finals enter the first round of the repechage system, The two losing quarterfinalists from each half of the draw face each other, again in single elimination. The two winners of these repechage rounds each face the losing semifinalist from the opposite half of the draw in the bronze medal finals.

== Results ==
=== Bracket ===
Round of 16
Miguel Galeano (ARG)	10
Thanwa Kaenkham (THA)	12
Xiao Xiang-wen (TPE)	37
Ebrahim Danishi (AFG)	7
Bharat Singh Mahata (NEP)	3
Mitsuya Tanaka (JPN)	19
Joel Martin Villalobos (ESP)	30
Jabirou Ide Oumarou (NIG)	13

Quarterfinals
Asaf Yasur (ISR)	23
Thanwa Kaenkham (THA)	6
Xiao Xiang-wen (TPE)	22
Bopha Kong (FRA)	1
Sabir Zeynalov (AZE)	6
Mitsuya Tanaka (JPN)	5
Joel Martin Villalobos (ESP)	17
Ali Can Özcan (TUR)	22

Semifinals
Asaf Yasur (ISR)	16
Xiao Xiang-wen (TPE)	6
Sabir Zeynalov (AZE)	18
Ali Can Özcan (TUR)	23

Final
Asaf Yasur (ISR)	19
Ali Can Özcan (TUR)	12

=== Repechage ===
Repechage
Thanwa Kaenkham (THA)	21
Bopha Kong (FRA)	3

Bronze medal
Thanwa Kaenkham (THA)	4
Sabir Zeynalov (AZE)	12

Repechage
Mitsuya Tanaka (JPN)	7
Joel Martin Villalobos (ESP)	8

Bronze medal
Joel Martin Villalobos (ESP)	8
Xiao Xiang-wen (TPE)	16
