= 2022 European Taekwondo Championships =

- Venue: Manchester Regional Arena
- Location: (United Kingdom) Manchester
- Dates: 19–22 May

Champion
- Turkey
- Men: Turkey
- Women: Turkey

The 2022 European Taekwondo Championships, the 25th edition of the European Taekwondo Championships, was held in Manchester, United Kingdom at the Manchester Regional Arena from 19 to 22 May 2022.

== Medal table ==
* Host nation (Great Britain)

Rank	Nation	Gold	Silver	Bronze	Total
1	Turkey (TUR)	5	2	4	11
2	Spain (ESP)	2	4	3	9
3	France (FRA)	2	2	3	7
4	Croatia (CRO)	2	1	5	8
5	Great Britain (GBR)*	2	0	3	5
6	Italy (ITA)	1	0	2	3
7	Serbia (SRB)	1	0	1	2
8	Hungary (HUN)	1	0	0	1
9	Poland (POL)	0	2	0	2
10	Israel (ISR)	0	1	2	3
11	Bosnia and Herzegovina (BIH)	0	1	0	1
11	Czech Republic (CZE)	0	1	0	1
11	Denmark (DEN)	0	1	0	1
11	Ireland (IRL)	0	1	0	1
15	Belgium (BEL)	0	0	2	2
15	Germany (GER)	0	0	2	2
17	Azerbaijan (AZE)	0	0	1	1
17	Norway (NOR)	0	0	1	1
17	Portugal (POR)	0	0	1	1
17	Refugee Team	0	0	1	1
17	Slovenia (SLO)	0	0	1	1
Totals (21 entries)		16	16	32	64

== Medal summary ==
=== Men ===
Event	Gold	Silver	Bronze
−54 kg	Omar Salim; Hungary	Görkem Polat; Turkey	Deniz Dağdelen; Turkey
−54 kg	Omar Salim; Hungary	Görkem Polat; Turkey	Josip Teskera; Croatia
−58 kg	Cyrian Ravet; France	Jack Woolley; Ireland	Vito Dell'Aquila; Italy
−58 kg	Cyrian Ravet; France	Jack Woolley; Ireland	Adrián Vicente; Spain
−63 kg	Hakan Reçber; Turkey	Souleyman Alaphilippe; France	Imran Özkaya; Germany
−63 kg	Hakan Reçber; Turkey	Souleyman Alaphilippe; France	Joan Jorquera; Spain
−68 kg	Bradly Sinden; Great Britain	Javier Pérez; Spain	Théo Lucien; France
−68 kg	Bradly Sinden; Great Britain	Javier Pérez; Spain	Nimrod Krivitzky; Israel
−74 kg	Stefan Takov; Serbia	Nedžad Husić; Bosnia and Herzegovina	Muhammed Emin Yıldız; Turkey
−74 kg	Stefan Takov; Serbia	Nedžad Husić; Bosnia and Herzegovina	Badr Achab; Belgium
−80 kg	Simone Alessio; Italy	Edi Hrnic; Denmark	Toni Kanaet; Croatia
−80 kg	Simone Alessio; Italy	Edi Hrnic; Denmark	Richard Ordemann; Norway
−87 kg	Ivan Šapina; Croatia	Raúl Martínez; Spain	Patrik Divkovič; Slovenia
−87 kg	Ivan Šapina; Croatia	Raúl Martínez; Spain	Enbiya Taha Biçer; Turkey
+87 kg	Emre Kutalmış Ateşli; Turkey	Iván García; Spain	Radik Isayev; Azerbaijan
+87 kg	Emre Kutalmış Ateşli; Turkey	Iván García; Spain	Paško Božić; Croatia

=== Women ===
Event	Gold	Silver	Bronze
−46 kg	Lena Stojković; Croatia	Emine Göğebakan; Turkey	Michal Zrihen; Portugal
−46 kg	Lena Stojković; Croatia	Emine Göğebakan; Turkey	Rivka Bayech; Israel
−49 kg	Merve Dinçel; Turkey	Avishag Semberg; Israel	Bruna Duvančić; Croatia
−49 kg	Merve Dinçel; Turkey	Avishag Semberg; Israel	Adriana Cerezo; Spain
−53 kg	Zeliha Ağrıs; Turkey	Alma Pérez; Spain	Ela Aydin; Germany
−53 kg	Zeliha Ağrıs; Turkey	Alma Pérez; Spain	Ivana Duvančić; Croatia
−57 kg	Hatice Kübra İlgün; Turkey	Patrycja Adamkiewicz; Poland	Jade Jones; Great Britain
−57 kg	Hatice Kübra İlgün; Turkey	Patrycja Adamkiewicz; Poland	Gaida Al Halwani; Italy
−62 kg	Jone Magdaleno; Spain	Petra Štolbová; Czech Republic	Sarah Chaari; Belgium
−62 kg	Jone Magdaleno; Spain	Petra Štolbová; Czech Republic	Kimia Alizadeh; International Olympic Committee
−67 kg	Cecilia Castro; Spain	Magda Wiet-Hénin; France	Aleksandra Perišić; Serbia
−67 kg	Cecilia Castro; Spain	Magda Wiet-Hénin; France	Lauren Williams; Great Britain
−73 kg	Althéa Laurin; France	Nika Klepac; Croatia	Rebecca McGowan; Great Britain
−73 kg	Althéa Laurin; France	Nika Klepac; Croatia	Marie-Paule Blé; France
+73 kg	Bianca Walkden; Great Britain	Aleksandra Kowalczuk; Poland	Solène Avoulette; France
+73 kg	Bianca Walkden; Great Britain	Aleksandra Kowalczuk; Poland	Nafia Kuş; Turkey

== Para Taekwondo ==
=== Medal table ===
* Host nation (Great Britain)

Rank	Nation	Gold	Silver	Bronze	Total
1	Turkey (TUR)	4	3	1	8
2	Great Britain (GBR)	2	0	2	4
2	Mexico (MEX)	2	0	2	4
4	Uzbekistan (UZB)	1	1	0	2
5	Croatia (CRO)	1	0	0	1
6	Azerbaijan (AZE)	0	1	2	3
6	Ukraine (UKR)	0	1	2	3
8	Serbia (SRB)	0	1	1	2
9	France (FRA)	0	1	0	1
9	Italy (ITA)	0	1	0	1
9	Spain (ESP)	0	1	0	1
12	Georgia (GEO)	0	0	5	5
13	Denmark (DEN)	0	0	1	1
13	Israel (ISR)	0	0	1	1
13	Poland (POL)	0	0	1	1
Totals (15 entries)		10	10	18	38

=== Medal summary ===
==== Men ====
Event	Class	Gold	Silver	Bronze
K44	-58 kg	Ali Can Özcan; Turkey	Bopha Kong; France	Sabir Zeynalov; Azerbaijan
K44	-58 kg	Ali Can Özcan; Turkey	Bopha Kong; France	Asaf Yasur; Israel
K44	-63 kg	Mahmut Bozteke; Turkey	Antonino Bossolo; Italy	Sandro Megrelishvili; Georgia
K44	-63 kg	Mahmut Bozteke; Turkey	Antonino Bossolo; Italy	Sadig Hamidov; Azerbaijan
K44	-70 kg	Juan García; Mexico	Imamaddin Khalilov; Azerbaijan	Maciej Kesicki; Poland
K44	-70 kg	Juan García; Mexico	Imamaddin Khalilov; Azerbaijan	Giorgi Nikoladze; Georgia
K44	-80 kg	Joseph Lane; Great Britain	Asadbek Toshtemirov; Uzbekistan	Luis Mario Najera; Mexico
K44	-80 kg	Joseph Lane; Great Britain	Asadbek Toshtemirov; Uzbekistan	Oktay Atalay; Turkey
K44	+80 kg	Ivan Mikulić; Croatia	Mehmet Sami Saraç; Turkey	David Makadze; Georgia
K44	+80 kg	Ivan Mikulić; Croatia	Mehmet Sami Saraç; Turkey	Orest Pylypiak; Ukraine

==== Women ====
Event	Class	Gold	Silver	Bronze
K44	-47 kg	Nurcihan Ekinci; Turkey	Viktoriia Marchuk; Ukraine	Ana Japaridze; Georgia
K44	-47 kg	Nurcihan Ekinci; Turkey	Viktoriia Marchuk; Ukraine	Claudia Romero; Mexico
K44	-52 kg	Jessica García Quijano; Mexico	Meryem Betül Çavdar; Turkey	Lia Chachibaia; Georgia
K44	-52 kg	Jessica García Quijano; Mexico	Meryem Betül Çavdar; Turkey	Keira Forsythe; Great Britain
K44	-57 kg	Gamze Gürdal; Turkey	Marija Mičev; Serbia	X
K44	-65 kg	Beth Munro; Great Britain	Seçil Er; Turkey	Lisa Gjessing; Denmark
K44	-65 kg	Beth Munro; Great Britain	Seçil Er; Turkey	Yuliya Lypetska; Ukraine
K44	+65 kg	Guljonoy Naimova; Uzbekistan	Dalia Santiago Moreno; Spain	Jelena Rasic; Serbia
K44	+65 kg	Guljonoy Naimova; Uzbekistan	Dalia Santiago Moreno; Spain	Amy Truesdale; Great Britain
