= Taekwondo at the 2020 Summer Paralympics – Men's 75 kg =

Taekwondo – Men's 75 kg K44 at the XVI Paralympic Games
- Venue: Makuhari Messe Hall B
- Date: 3 September 2021
- Competitors: 11 from 11 nations

Medalists
1st place, gold medalist(s)		Juan Diego García López	Mexico
2nd place, silver medalist(s)		Mahdi Pourrahnama	Iran
3rd place, bronze medalist(s)		Joo Jeong-hun	South Korea
3rd place, bronze medalist(s)		Juan Samorano	Argentina

The men's 75 kg taekwondo competition at the 2020 Summer Paralympics was held on 3 September 2021 at the Makuhari Messe Hall B.

== Results ==
=== Bracket ===
Round of 16
Abulfaz Abuzarli (AZE)	WDQ
Allain Ganapin (PHI)	DSQ
Magomedzagir Isaldibirov (RPC)	35
Joo Jeong-hun (KOR)	31
Juan Samorano (ARG)	52
Anton Shvets (UKR)	20
Fatih Çelik (TUR)	38
Ibrahima Seye (SEN)	19

Quarterfinals
Juan Diego García López (MEX)	38
Abulfaz Abuzarli (AZE)	5
Magomedzagir Isaldibirov (RPC)	31
Shunsuke Kudo (JPN)	23
Nurlan Dombayev (KAZ)	27
Juan Samorano (ARG)	25
Fatih Çelik (TUR)	21
Mahdi Pourrahnama (IRI)	37

Semifinals
Juan Diego García López (MEX)	14
Magomedzagir Isaldibirov (RPC)	12
Nurlan Dombayev (KAZ)	6
Mahdi Pourrahnama (IRI)	24

Final
Juan Diego García López (MEX)	26
Mahdi Pourrahnama (IRI)	20

=== Repechage ===
Repechage 1
Joo Jeong-hun (KOR)	40
Fatih Çelik (TUR)	31
Anton Shvets (UKR)	36
Abulfaz Abuzarli (AZE)	60

Repechage 2
Joo Jeong-hun (KOR)	46
Abulfaz Abuzarli (AZE)	32

Bronze medal
Magomedzagir Isaldibirov (RPC)	14
Joo Jeong-hun (KOR)	24

Repechage 1
Ibrahima Seye (SEN)	31
Shunsuke Kudo (JPN)	52

Repechage 2
Juan Samorano (ARG)	42
Shunsuke Kudo (JPN)	22

Bronze medal
Nurlan Dombayev (KAZ)	12
Juan Samorano (ARG)	13
