= Antonino Bossolo =

Italian parataekwondo practitioner (born 1995)

Personal information
- Nationality: Italian
- Born: 27 January 1995 (age 31) Palermo, Italy

Sport
- Sport: Para taekwondo
- Disability class: K44
- Weight class: –63 kg
Medal record
Men's para taekwondo
Representing Italy
Paralympic Games
Bronze medal – third place	2024 Paris	−63 kg
European Taekwondo Championships
Silver medal – second place	2022 Macnehster	−63 kg

Antonino Bossolo (born 27 January 1995) is an Italian para taekwondo practitioner.

== Career ==
Bossolo represented Italy at the 2020 Summer Paralympics in the −61 kg category and lost to Mahmut Bozteke in the bronze medal match. He again represented Italy at the 2024 Summer Paralympics and won a bronze medal in the −63 kg category.
