= 2022 European Para Youth Games =

- Logo
- Host city: Lahti, Finland
- Nations: 28
- Athletes: 415
- Events: 8 sports
- Opening: 27 June 2022
- Closing: 4 July 2022
- Main venue: Pajulahti Olympic and Paralympic Training Center

The 2022 European Para Youth Games were the 6th edition of the European Para Youth Games (EPYG), a multi-sport event for young para-athletes aged between 13 and 23 from the member countries of the European Paralympic Committee (EPC). They were held between 27 June and 4 July 2022 in Lahti, Finland. 415 athletes from 28 countries took part. This was the second time Lahti had hosted the event, having also hosted the previous edition in 2019.

== Sports ==
The following competitions took place:

2022 European Para Youth Games sports programme
- Athletics
- Boccia
- Goalball
- Judo
- Showdown
- Swimming
- Table tennis
- Wheelchair basketball

== Medals table ==
Rank	Nation	Gold	Silver	Bronze	Total
1	Spain	23	20	10	53
2	France	17	16	14	47
3	Italy	13	14	15	42
4	Croatia	10	1	5	16
5	Germany	8	3	5	16
6	Portugal	8	2	3	13
7	Poland	7	5	4	16
8	Czech Republic	5	6	3	14
9	Norway	5	6	2	13
10	Belgium	4	5	4	13
11	Finland	2	5	4	11
12	Hungary	2	2	2	6
13	Sweden	2	1	3	6
14	Romania	2	0	0	2
15	Slovakia	1	2	1	4
16	Estonia	1	2	0	3
17	Bulgaria	1	1	2	4
18	Israel	1	1	0	2
19	Turkey	1	0	0	1
20	Greece	0	4	0	4
21	Great Britain	0	2	4	6
22	Denmark	0	2	2	4
23	Netherlands	0	1	0	1
24	Iceland	0	0	2	2
24	Lithuania	0	0	2	2
24	Slovenia	0	0	2	2
27	Montenegro	0	0	1	1
Totals (27 entries)		113	101	90	304
