= Taekwondo at the 2024 Summer Paralympics – Men's 70 kg =

Taekwondo – Men's 70 kg K44 at the XVII Paralympic Games
- Venue: Grand Palais, Paris
- Date: 30 August 2024
- Competitors: 12 from 12 nations

Medalists
1st place, gold medalist(s)		Imamaddin Khalilov	Azerbaijan
2nd place, silver medalist(s)		Fatih Çelik	Turkey
3rd place, bronze medalist(s)		JD Garcia	Mexico
3rd place, bronze medalist(s)		JE Samorano	Argentina

The men's 70 kg taekwondo competition at the 2024 Summer Paralympics was held on 30 August 2024 at the Grand Palais, Paris. 12 athletes took part.

== Results ==
Bracket

Round of 16

Quarter-finals

Semi-finals

Gold medal match

30 August, South Paris Arena

Michel Suárez (CUB)
2

30 August, South Paris Arena

Imamaddin Khalilov (AZE)
12

Michel Suárez (CUB)
18

30 August, South Paris Arena

Bi Michel Boli (CIV)
17

Imamaddin Khalilov (AZE)
7

30 August, South Paris Arena

Javokhir Alikulov (UZB)
2

JD Garcia (MEX)
19

30 August, South Paris Arena

Herea Loi (PNG)
0

JD Garcia (MEX)
4

Javokhir Alikulov (UZB)
5

30 August, South Paris Arena

Imamaddin Khalilov (AZE)
15

Fatih Çelik (TUR)
2

30 August, South Paris Arena

JE Samorano (ARG)
2

30 August, South Paris Arena

Shunsuke Kudo (JPN)
4

Tanapan Sotthiset (THA)
10

30 August, South Paris Arena

JE Samorano (ARG)
14

Shunsuke Kudo (JPN)
10

30 August, South Paris Arena

Fatih Çelik (TUR)
15

Giorgi Nikoladze (GEO)
18

30 August, South Paris Arena

Abdel Mahmoud (EGY)
16

Giorgi Nikoladze (GEO)
19

Fatih Çelik (TUR)
24

Repechage

Repechage match
30 August, South Paris Arena
Michel Suárez (CUB)	10
JD Garcia (MEX)	17

Bronze medal match
30 August, South Paris Arena
JD Garcia (MEX)	5
Shunsuke Kudo (JPN)	3

Repechage match
30 August, South Paris Arena
JE Samorano (ARG)	15
Giorgi Nikoladze (GEO)	3

Bronze medal match
30 August, South Paris Arena
JE Samorano (ARG)	6
Javokhir Alikulov (UZB)	5
