= 2026 Maccabiah Games =

22nd edition of Jewish multi-sport event

22nd Maccabiah
- Country: Israel
- Motto: More Than Ever
- Opening: July 1, 2026
- Closing: July 13, 2026
- Opened by: Isaac Herzog
- Closed by: Artem Dolgopyat
- Torchbearers: Inbar Lanir; Asaf Yasur
- Website: maccabiah.com

The 2026 Maccabiah Games (Hebrew: משחקי המכביה 2026), also known as the 22nd Maccabiah (Hebrew: המכביה ה-22), took place in Israel from July 1 to July 13, 2026, under the theme "More Than Ever". Originally scheduled for 2025, the Games were postponed a year due to ongoing regional conflict. Approximately 5,000 athletes representing over 40 countries competed.

First held in 1932, the Maccabiah Games are a quadrennial international multi-sports competition for Jewish athletes from around the world and Israeli citizens.

== Opening ceremony ==
The July 1 opening ceremony, held at Teddy Stadium in Jerusalem, was hosted by Assi Azar and Montana Tucker and featured a parade of approximately 5,000 athletes representing over 40 countries. Entertainment included musical performances by Yuval Raphael, Neta Barzilai, Anna Zak, Itay Levi, and a collaboration between Idan Raichel and former hostages Daniella Gilboa and Edan Alexander. The ceremonial Maccabiah torch was carried by disabled IDF veteran Evyatar Zeituni, before being passed to Paralympic taekwondo champion Asaf Yasur and Olympic judo medalist Inbar Lanir, who jointly lit the flame.

== Closing ceremony ==
The July 13 closing ceremony featured medal presentations and a film tribute honoring the victims killed during and after the October 7 attacks. Olympic gymnastics medalist and Maccabiah ambassador Artem Dolgopyat extinguished the Maccabiah flame, formally marking the end of the competition.

== See also ==
- Sport in Israel
