= Asaf Yasur =

Israeli para taekwondo practitioner

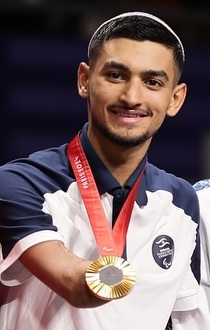
- Yasur at the 2024 Summer Paralympics

Personal information
- Nationality: Israeli
- Born: Asaf Yasur אסף יסעור; 17 April 2002 (age 24) Jerusalem, Israel

Sport
- Sport: Para taekwondo
- Club: Sharabi Martial Arts
- Coached by: Yechiam Sharabi

Achievements and titles
- Paralympic finals: (gold) (2024)
- World finals: (gold) (2021, 2023)
- Regional finals: (gold) (2024)
Medal record
Men's para taekwondo
Representing Israel
Paralympic Games
| Gold medal – first place | 2024 Paris | ‍–‍58 kg |
World Para Taekwondo Championships
| Gold medal – first place | 2021 Istanbul | ‍–‍58 kg |
| Gold medal – first place | 2023 Veracruz | ‍–‍58 kg |
European Para Championships
| Silver medal – second place | 2023 Rotterdam | ‍–‍58 kg |
European Championships
| Gold medal – first place | 2024 Belgrade | ‍–‍58 kg |
| Gold medal – first place | 2026 Munich | ‍–‍58 kg |
| Bronze medal – third place | 2022 Manchester | ‍–‍58 kg |

Asaf Yasur (Hebrew: אסף יסעור; born 17 April 2002) is an Israeli Paralympic champion and world champion para taekwondo athlete. He was world champion in both 2021 and 2023. He represented Israel at the 2024 Paris Paralympics, and won the gold medal in the Men's 58 kg.

== Early life ==
Yasur is from Jerusalem, Israel. He lost both his hands at age 12. He was trying to retrieve a lost ball, when he was accidentally electrocuted by a high-voltage electric cable and suffered injuries that required amputation.

== Career ==
Yasur trains at the Sharabi Martial Arts club in Ramla, Israel, coached by Israeli trainer Yechiam Sharabi.

=== 2019–23 ===
In 2019 Yasur gained his first international medal, achieving second place at the Mexico Para Taekwondo Open Championships.

Yasur won the gold medal in the 2021 World Para-Taekwondo Championships in Istanbul. After winning the 2023 World Para Taekwondo Championships in Mexico, Yasur qualified for the 2024 Summer Paralympics.

=== 2024–present; Paris Paralympics championship ===
He won a gold medal for Israel at the 2024 Paris Paralympics, competing at 22 years of age. He beat Turkey's Ali Can Özcan 19–12 in the final of the men's -58 kg weight class. He said: "With everything my country is going through… this is the least I could do for my country," and that he hoped for the return of the hostages from Gaza, an end to the war, and for "all the soldiers to return home healthy and whole."

== Honors ==
Yasur and Olympic judo medalist Inbar Lanir jointly shared the honor of lighting the 2026 Maccabiah Games flame as the final torchbearers, officially opening the event.

== See also ==
- List of 2024 Summer Paralympics medal winners
