= Matt Bush (taekwondo) =

Welsh para taekwondo practitioner (born 1988)

Personal information
- Nationality: United Kingdom
- Born: 22 December 1988 (age 37) Pembrokeshire, Wales

Sport
- Country: United Kingdom
- Sport: Para Taekwondo
- Disability class: F44
- Weight class: +80kg
Medal record
Men's Para taekwondo
Representing Great Britain
Paralympic Games
Gold medal – first place	2024 Paris	+80 kg
World Championships
Gold medal – first place	2019 Antalya	+80 kg
Gold medal – first place	2023 Veracruz	+80 kg
European Championships
Gold medal – first place	2026 Munich	+80 kg
Silver medal – second place	2023 Rotterdam	+80 kg
Bronze medal – third place	2024 Belgrade	+80 kg

Matt Bush (born 22 December 1988) is a Welsh para taekwondo practitioner who competes in the F44 classification in the +80 kg category. Bush, who does not have a left hand and forearm, is a two-time champion at the World Para Taekwondo Championships.

== Career ==
Prior to his para taekwondo career, Bush was a javelin thrower. He had been set to make his Paralympic debut at the 2016 Summer Paralympics but he withdrew due to a shoulder injury. Shortly afterward, he switched to para taekwondo.

At the 2019 World Championships, Bush won the gold medal to become Britain's first world champion in para taewkwondo. He was named to the national para taekwondo squad at the rescheduled 2020 Summer Paralympics in 2021 in para taekwondo. However he was forced to withdraw after he had injured his ACL and was replace by his teammate Joe Lane. At the 2023 European Para Championships, Bush won the silver medal after losing to Ivan Mikulić in the gold medal match. At the World Championships in September 2023, he won his second gold medal.

Bush competed in the 2024 European Taekwondo Championships, where he won the gold medal in his category. The following month, he was announced as one of three members and the only male of the British para taekwondo team for the 2024 Summer Paralympics. Bush defeated Neutral Paralympic athlete Aliaskhab Ramazanov in the men's K44 +80 kg final to claim gold at the 2024 Paralympics Games in Paris, France. He was chosen as one of Great Britain's flagbearers for the closing ceremony alongside swimmer Poppy Maskill.
