= Luis Mario Nájera =

Mexican para taekwondo practitioner (born 2001)

Personal information
- Full name: Luis Mario Nájera Vleeschower
- Born: 13 May 2001 (age 25)

Sport
- Country: Mexico
- Sport: Para taekwondo
Medal record
Men's para taekwondo
Representing Mexico
Paralympic Games
Silver medal – second place	2024 Paris	80 kg
European Championships
Bronze medal – third place	2022 Manchester	-80 kg
Parapan American Games
Silver medal – second place	2023 Santiago	-80 kg

Luis Mario Nájera Vleeschower (born 13 May 2001) is a Mexican para taekwondo practitioner.

Nájera competed at the 2022 European Taekwondo Championships, winning a bronze medal in the -80 kg event. He competed at the 2023 Parapan American Games, winning the silver medal in -80 kg category.
