= Lütfiye Özdağ =

Turkish parataekwondo practitioner

Personal information
- Born: Eskişehir, Turkey

Sport
- Sport: Para Taekwondo
- Disability class: K44
- Event: -65 lg
Medal record
Women's Para Taekwondo
Representing Turkey
European Championships
Bronze medal – third place	2023 Montargis	K44 -65 kg
Bronze medal – third place	2024 Belgrade	K44 52 kg
European Para Championships
Silver medal – second place	2023 Rotterdam	K44 -65 kg

Lütfiye Özdağ is a Turkish Para Taekwondo practitioner.

== Career ==
Özdağ took the bronze medal at the 2023 European Taekwondo Championships in Montargis, Franzeç She won thesilver medal in the K44 -65 kg event the 2023 European Para Championships in Rotterdam, Netherlands.
