= Tuana Çelik =

Turkish para taekwondo practitioner (born 2008)

Personal information
- Born: 2008 (age 17–18) Bor, Niğde, Turkey

Sport
- Sport: Para Taekwondo
- Disability class: K44
- Event: -57 kg
- Coached by: Ahmet Gün
Medal record
Women's Para Taekwondo
Representing Turkey
European Championships
Bronze medal – third place	2026 Munich	K44 -57 kg
2025 European Para Youth Games
Silver medal – second place	2025 Istanbul	K44 -57 kg

Tuana Çelik (born 2008) is a Turkish Para Taekwondo practitioner who competes in the K44 disability class of -57 kg.

== Sport career ==
Çelik, a physically disabled girl, started performing taekwondo in 2022 with the guidance of her teacher of physical education Ahmet Gün at the secondary school and with the approval of her family. She trained hard under her teacher, who is also the coach of the local sports school, and began to enter competitions. In January 2025, In her first participation at the national para taekwondo championships in Ankara, she managed to come third. Upon her success, she was selected to the national team to take part at the upcoming 12th International Turkish Open Taekwondo Tournament 2025 in Antalya. She won the silver medal at the 2025 European Para Youth Games in Istanbul, Turkey.

In February 2026, she became Turkish champion at the Para Taekwondo Championships in Ankara. At the 2026 European Championships in Munich, Germany, she took a bronze medal.

== Personal life ==
Born in 2008, Tuana Çelik is a native of Yerköy in Yozgat Province, Turkey. Following an accident, she became physically disabled at the age of eight.

She was a student of Şehit Mehmet Tez Anatolian High School in her hometown.
