= Mahmut Bozteke =

Turkish Para Taekwondo athlete (born 1997)

Personal information
- Born: 5 March 1997 (age 29) Şanlıurfa, Turkey

Sport
- Sport: Para Taekwondo
- Disability class: K44
- Weight class: 61 kg
Medal record
Men's Para Taekwondo
Representing Turkey
Paralympic Games
Gold medal – first place	2024 Paris	K44 63 kg
Bronze medal – third place	2020 Tokyo	K44 61 kg
World Championships
Silver medal – second place	2017 London	K44 61 kg
Silver medal – second place	2023 Veracruz	K44 63 kg
Bronze medal – third place	2015 Samsun	K44 61 kg
Bronze medal – third place	2019 Antalya	K44 61 kg
Bronze medal – third place	2021 Istanbul	K44 63 kg
European Championships
Gold medal – first place	2019 Bari	K44 61 kg
Gold medal – first place	2021 Istanbul	K44 63 kg
Gold medal – first place	2022 Manchester	K44 63 kg
Gold medal – first place	2026 Munich	K44 63 kg
Silver medal – second place	2018 Plovdiv	K44 61 kg
Silver medal – second place	2024 Belgrade	K44 63 kg
Bronze medal – third place	2016 Warsaw	K44 61 kg
European Para Championships
Gold medal – first place	2023 Rotterdam	K44 63 kg

Mahmut Bozteke (born 21 June 1997) is a Turkish Para Taekwondo athlete. He is a two-time Paralympian.

== Early life ==
At age eleven, his arms were caught in the tail shaft of a tractor while he was working in a pistachio tree garden. Bozteke's arms were severed in the accident, and he was hospitalised for three and half months. He had a partial amputation of his arms and tissue taken from his legs allowed partial reconstruction of his arms over the course of fifteen operations. He was bedridden at home for a year recovering from injury and the operations. Having no hands, he learned to do his daily work with his feet. He was introduced to Taekwondo at a gymnasium of the Youth and Sports Provincial Directorate in his neighbourhood on the recommendation of his physiotherapist, who told him, "You use your feet well, I think you can practise taekwondo." During his secondary education at Kanuni Sultan Süleyman High School, he participated in regional competitions for para-swimming in the S6 disability class.

== Sports career ==
The 23-year-old athlete became the Turkish champion in Para Taekwondo before he competed internationally.

He won the bronze medal in the K44 disability class in the under 61 kilograms (134 lb) weight class at the 2016 European Para Taekwondo Championships held in Warsaw, Poland. At the 2017 World Para Taekwondo Championships in London, England, he won the silver medal in the K44 61 kilograms (134 lb) event. Bozteke won the gold medal in the K44 61 kilograms (134 lb) event at the 2019 Para Taekwondo Championships in Bari, Italy.

Bozteke qualified for the para-taekwondo games at the rescheduled 2020 Summer Paralympics to be held in Tokyo, Japan, beginning on 24 August 2021. He waon one of the bronze medals in the -61 kg event.

He was named as one of two flag bearers along with Sevilay Öztürk by the Turkish National Paralympic Committee to lead the Turkish contingent for the opening ceremony of the 2024 Summer Paralympics in Paris, France. He captured the gold medal defeating Mongolian Bolor-Erdene Ganbat in the final of the K44 63 kg event at the 2024 Paris Paralympic Games.
