= Cebeci Sports Complex =

Sport venue in Sultangazi, Istanbul, Turkey

Cebeci Sports Complex Cebeci Spor Kompleksi
- Interactive map of Cebeci Sports Complex; Cebeci Spor Kompleksi
- Location: Sultangazi, Istanbul, Turkey
- Coordinates: 41.1074°N 28.8765°E
- Owner: Istanbul Metropolitan Municipality (İBB)

Construction
- Groundbreaking: 2010
- Opened: 2012; 14 years ago

Tenant
- Spor Istanbul

Cebeci Sports Complex (Turkish: Cebeci Spor Kompleksi) is a sports complex featuring a multi-purpose sport hall, a football stadium and an indoor swimming pool, located in Sultangazi district of Istanbul Province, Turkey. It is owned by the Istanbul Metropolitan Municipality (İBB).

The complex is situated at Atatürk Blv. 56, Uğur Mumcu Mah. in Sultangazi of Istanbul Province. It was constructed between 2010 and 2012 and is run by Istanbul Spor, a subsidiary of the İBB.

Cebeci Sport Hall Cebeci Spor Salonu
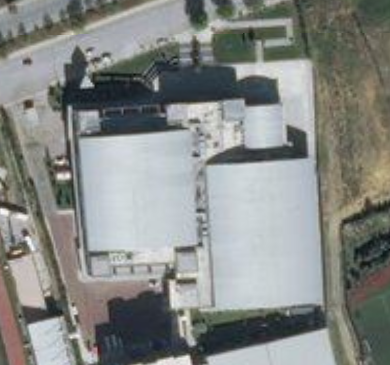
- Interactive map of Cebeci Sport Hall; Cebeci Spor Salonu
- Location: Sultangazi, Istanbul, Turkey
- Coordinates: 41.1076°N 28.8766°E
- Owner: Istanbul Metropolitan Municipality
- Capacity: 1,250

Construction
- Opened: 2012; 14 years ago

Tenants
- İstanbul BB; Eczacıbaşı Dynavit /2024–25)

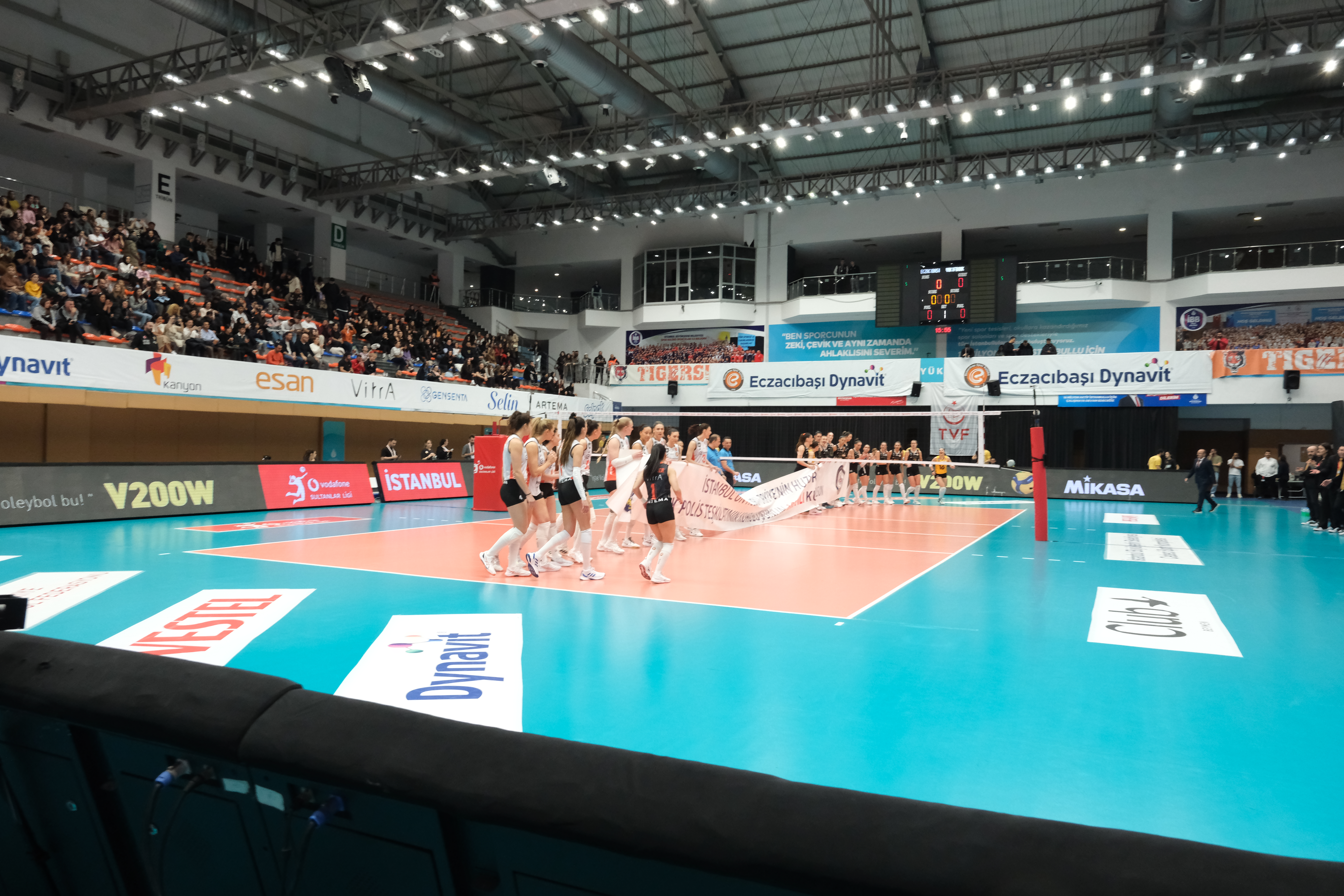
2024–25 Sultans League play-off match between Eczacıbaşı Dynavit and VakıfBank in the Cebeci Sports Hall.

Cebeci Sport Hall (Turkish: Cebeci Spor Salonu) is an indoor multi-purpose sport venue that is part of the İBB Cebeci Sports Complex. The hall, with a capacity for 1,850 spectators, was built in 2012. It is home to men's and women's volleyball teams playing in the Turkish volleyball leagues, as well as İstanbul BB, which plays currently in the Turkish Basketball League. The women's volleyball team Eczacıbaşı Dynavit plays their home matches in the 2024–25 Turkish Women's Volleyball League season at the venue.

== International events hosted ==
- 24–27 July, 2025 European Para Youth Games.
