= Xiao Xiang-wen =

Taiwanese parataekwondo practitioner (born 1999)

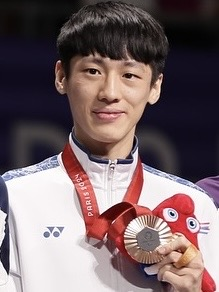
- Xiao at the 2024 Summer Paralympics

Personal information
- Born: 蕭翔文; 18 February 1999 (age 27)

Sport
- Country: Chinese Taipei
- Sport: Para taekwondo
- Event: –58 kg
Medal record
Men's para taekwondo
Representing Chinese Taipei
Summer Paralympics
Bronze medal – third place	2024 Paris	58 kg
Asian Para Games
Gold medal – first place	2022 Hangzhou	58 kg
Gold medal – first place	2026 Aichi-Nogoya	58 kg

Xiao Xiang-wen (born 18 February 1999) is a Taiwanese para taekwondo practitioner. He represented Chinese Taipei at the 2024 Summer Paralympics.

== Career ==
He represented Chinese Taipei at the 2024 Summer Paralympics and won a bronze medal in the 58 kg category.
