= Liliana Balla =

German taekwondo practitioner (born 2009)

Personal information
- Born: 15 September 2009 (age 16)

Sport
- Country: Germany
- Sport: Taekwondo
- Event: 46 kg
- Club: Sportwerk Düsseldorf
Medal record
Representing Germany
European Championships
Bronze medal – third place	2026 Munich	46 kg

Liliana Balla (born 15 September 2009) is a German taekwondo practitioner. She has competed for Germany at junior and senior international level.

At the 2026 Austrian Open, she won a silver medal. At the 2026 European Taekwondo, she won the bronze medal in the women's 46 kg division.
