= Kristian Storsul Borgen =

Norwegian taekwondo practitioner (born 2003)

Personal information
- Full name: Kristian Storsul Borgen
- Born: 19 July 2003 (age 22)

Sport
- Country: Norway
- Sport: Taekwondo
- Event: 58 kg / 63 kg / 68 kg
- Club: Ski Taekwondo Klubb
- Coached by: Tim Borgen
Medal record
Representing Norway
European Championships
Gold medal – first place	2026 Munich	63 kg
World University Games
Bronze medal – third place	2025 Rhine-Ruhr	63 kg
European Junior Championships
Bronze medal – third place	2019 Marina d'Or	55 kg
European Cadet Championships
Bronze medal – third place	2017 Budapest	45 kg

Kristian Storsul Borgen (born 19 July 2003), also known as Kristian Borgen, is a Norwegian taekwondo practitioner. Competing in the men's 63 kg division, Borgen won the gold medal at the 2026 European Taekwondo Championships. He also won the bronze medal in the 63 kg event at the 2025 Summer World University Games.

== Career ==
Borgen represents Norway in international competitions. He has competed in numerous junior and senior events.

At the 2025 Summer World University Games, he won the bronze medal in the 63 kg event.

In 2026, Borgen won gold medals in the 63 kg event at the Fujairah Open and the Dutch Open. At the 2026 European Taekwondo Championships held in Munich, Germany, he won the gold medal in the men's 63 kg event. He defeated France's Cyrian Ravet 2–0 in the final to become European champion.

== Personal life ==
Borgen was born on 19 July 2003.
