= Mahdi Pourrahnama =

Iranian para taekwondo practitioner

Personal information
- Born: 20 June 1995 (age 31) Bandar-e Anzali, Iran

Sport
- Country: Iran
- Sport: Para taekwondo
- Weight class: 75 kg
Medal record
Representing Iran
Paralympic Games
Silver medal – second place	2020 Tokyo	75 kg
World Championships
Gold medal – first place	2012 Aruba	75 kg
Gold medal – first place	2015 Chelyabinsk	75 kg
Gold medal – first place	2017 Muju	75 kg
IWAS World Games
Gold medal – first place	2015 Sochi	75 kg
Gold medal – first place	2017 Vila Real	75 kg
Asian Taekwondo Championships
Gold medal – first place	2016 Pasay	75 kg
Gold medal – first place	2018 Ho Chi Minh City	75 kg
Gold medal – first place	2021 Lebanon	75 kg
Asian Para Games
Gold medal – first place	2022 Hangzhou	70 kg
Bronze medal – third place	2026 Aichi–Nagoya	80 kg

Mahdi Pourrahnama (born 20 June 1995) is an Iranian para taekwondo practitioner. He won the silver medal in the men's 75 kg event at the 2020 Summer Paralympics in Tokyo, Japan.
