= Alireza Bakht =

Iranian parataekwondo practitioner (born 1999)

Personal information
- Nationality: Iranian
- Born: 17 September 1999 (age 27) Bushehr, Iran

Sport
- Sport: Para taekwondo
- Disability class: K44
- Event: –80 kg
Medal record
Men's para taekwondo
Representing Iran
Paralympic Games
Bronze medal – third place	2024 Paris	−80 kg
Asian Para Games
Gold medal – first place	2026 Aichi–Nagoya	−80 kg
Silver medal – second place	2022 Hangzhou	−80 kg

Alireza Bakht (born 17 September 1999) is an Iranian para taekwondo practitioner. He represented Iran at the 2024 Summer Paralympics.

== Career ==
Bakht represented Iran at the 2022 Asian Para Games and won a silver medal in the −80 kg category.

He represented Iran at the 2024 Summer Paralympics and won a bronze medal in the −80 kg category.
