= Kumushkhon Khodjaeva =

Uzbekistani Paralympic judoka (born 1997)

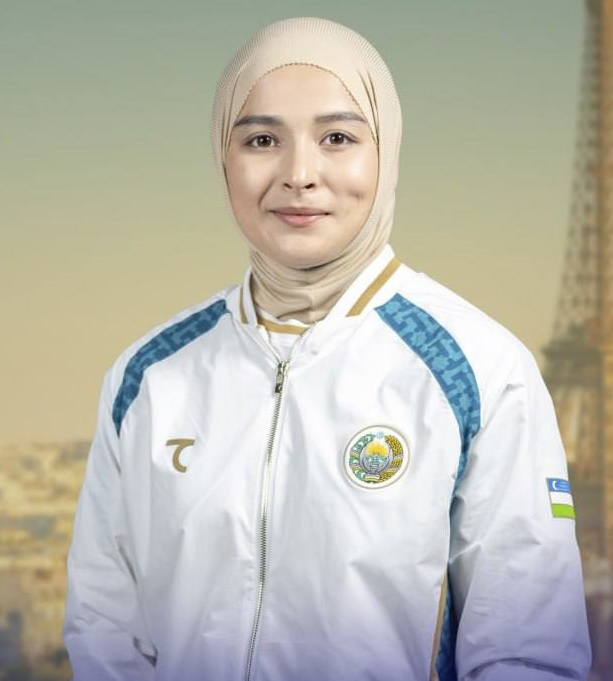

Personal information
- Nationality: Uzbekistani
- Born: 20 July 1997 (age 28)

Sport
- Country: Uzbekistan
- Sport: Para judo
- Disability class: J2
- Weight class: −57 kg
Medal record
Women's para judo
Representing Uzbekistan
Paralympic Games
| Silver medal – second place | 2024 Paris | −57 kg J2 |

Kumushkhon Khodjaeva (born 20 July 1997) is an Uzbekistani Paralympic judoka. She represented Uzbekistan at the 2024 Summer Paralympics, where she won a silver medal.

== Career ==
Khodjaeva was born on 20 July 1997 in Toʻraqoʻrgʻon, in the Namangan region, Uzbekistan.

Khodjaeva was educated at the Namangan Olympic Reserve College, then studied at the Faculty of Philology and Language Teaching at the Uzbekistan State World Languages University.

Khodjaeva has been a member of the Uzbekistan Parajudo team since 2022.

In 2023, Khodjaeva won a silver medal at the 2023 World Judo Championships in England, which qualified her to compete at the 2024 Summer Paralympics in Paris.

At the 2024 Summer Paralympics, Khodjaeva won a silver medal in the J2 class and −57 kg weight category. She defeated Marta Arce Payno from Spain in the semi-finals then was beaten in the final match by Japanese judoka Junko Hirose.
