= Yasin Çelik =

Turkish footballer

Personal information
- Date of birth: 8 April 1975 (age 51)
- Place of birth: Adapazarı, Turkey
- Height: 1.75 m (5 ft 9 in)
- Position: Fullback

Senior career*
| Years | Team | Apps | (Gls) |
| 1997–2002 | Sakaryaspor | 54 | (0) |
| 1999–2000 | → Ankaragücü (loan) | 22 | (0) |
| 2002–2006 | Konyaspor | 137 | (6) |
| 2007–2008 | Ankaragücü | 28 | (1) |
| 2008 | Sakaryaspor | 16 | (0) |
| 2008–2009 | Kartalspor | 19 | (0) |

International career^{‡}
| 1998 | Turkey | 1 | (0) |
- * Club domestic league appearances and goals as of 20 October 2008 ‡ National team caps and goals as of 20 October 2008

Yasin Çelik (born 8 April 1975) is a Turkish footballer who plays fullback for Kartalspor in the TFF First League.

== Club career ==
Çelik has appeared in over 180 matches in the Turkish Süper Lig, primarily for Konyaspor.

== International career ==
Çelik made one appearance for the full Turkey national team in a friendly against Russia on 22 April 1998.
