= 2021 European Para Taekwondo Championships =

- Venue: Istanbul Pullman Hotel
- Location: Istanbul, Turkey
- Dates: 23 September

The 2021 European Para Taekwondo Championships, was the 6th edition of the tournament, and took place on 23 September 2021.

== Medal table ==
* Host nation (Turkey)

Rank	NPC	Gold	Silver	Bronze	Total
1	Russia (RUS)	6	5	4	15
2	Turkey (TUR)*	5	7	11	23
3	Kazakhstan (KAZ)	2	0	2	4
4	Spain (ESP)	1	0	0	1
5	Ukraine (UKR)	0	1	1	2
6	Poland (POL)	0	1	0	1
7	France (FRA)	0	0	1	1
7	Georgia (GEO)	0	0	1	1
Totals (8 entries)		14	14	20	48

== Medalists ==
The medalists per event were as follows:

=== Men's ===
Event	Class	Gold	Silver	Bronze
K41	-58 kg	Rinat Iakupov; Russia	Muhammed Asbala; Turkey	Muhammet Uğur Bitkay; Turkey
K41	-58 kg	Rinat Iakupov; Russia	Muhammed Asbala; Turkey	George Khizanishvili; Georgia
K41	-63 kg	Sabit Köse; Turkey	Vladislav Krichfalushiy; Russia	not awarded
K41	-80 kg	Malik Mukashev; Kazakhstan	Yildiray Erdic; Turkey	not awarded
K41	+80 kg	Spartak Gazzaev; Russia	Adem Arslan; Turkey	not awarded
K44	-58 kg	Askhat Akmatov; Russia	Ali Can Özcan; Turkey	Bopha Kong; France
K44	-58 kg	Askhat Akmatov; Russia	Ali Can Özcan; Turkey	Arzhan Arbakov; Russia
K44	-63 kg	Mahmut Bozteke; Turkey	Evgenii Alifirenko; Russia	Mikail Akay; Turkey
K44	-63 kg	Mahmut Bozteke; Turkey	Evgenii Alifirenko; Russia	Rafet Samet Adiyaman; Turkey
K44	-70 kg	Fatih Çelik; Turkey	Maciej Kęsicki; Poland	Oktay Atalay; Turkey
K44	-70 kg	Fatih Çelik; Turkey	Maciej Kęsicki; Poland	Kadibagama Omarov; Russia
K44	-80 kg	Vladimir Feofanov; Russia	Magomedzagir Isaldibirov; Russia	Nurlan Dombayev; Kazakhstan
K44	-80 kg	Vladimir Feofanov; Russia	Magomedzagir Isaldibirov; Russia	Vladyslav Nechai; Ukraine
K44	+80 kg	Aliaskhab Ramazanov; Russia	Bilal Iakhiaev; Russia	Nyshan Omirali; Kazakhstan
K44	+80 kg	Aliaskhab Ramazanov; Russia	Bilal Iakhiaev; Russia	Zainutdin Ataev; Russia

=== Women's ===
Event	Class	Gold	Silver	Bronze
K44	-47 kg	Dzhetsun-Sholbana Kara-Ool; Russia	Viktoriia Marchuk; Ukraine	Nurcihan Ekinci; Turkey
K44	-47 kg	Dzhetsun-Sholbana Kara-Ool; Russia	Viktoriia Marchuk; Ukraine	Büşra Emire; Turkey
K44	-52 kg	Meryem Betül Çavdar; Turkey	Anna Poddubskaia; Russia	Emine Altun; Turkey
K44	-57 kg	Kamilya Dosmalova; Kazakhstan	Gamze Gürdal; Turkey	Raganina Karina; Russia
K44	-57 kg	Kamilya Dosmalova; Kazakhstan	Gamze Gürdal; Turkey	Tugce Sen; Turkey
K44	-65 kg	Seçil Er; Turkey	Şeyma Nur Emeksiz Bacaksız; Turkey	Lutfiye Ozdag; Turkey
K44	+65 kg	Dalia Santiago Moreno; Spain	Ayşe Dudu Karatay; Turkey	Kadriye Turgut; Turkey
K44	+65 kg	Dalia Santiago Moreno; Spain	Ayşe Dudu Karatay; Turkey	Gulsun Celik; Turkey

== See also ==
- 2021 European Taekwondo Championships
