= Nathan Torquato =

Brazilian para taekwondo practitioner

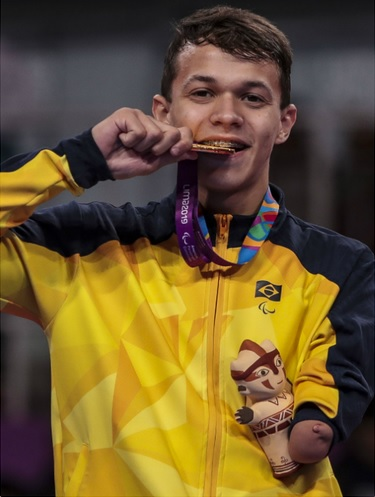
- Torquato in 2019

Personal information
- Full name: Nathan Cesar Sodario Torquato
- Born: 9 January 2001 (age 25) Praia Grande, Brazil

Sport
- Country: Brazil
- Sport: Para taekwondo
Medal record
Representing Brazil
Paralympic Games
Gold medal – first place	2020 Tokyo	61 kg
Parapan American Games
Gold medal – first place	2019 Lima	61 kg
Gold medal – first place	2023 Santiago	63 kg

Nathan Cesar Sodario Torquato (born 9 January 2001) is a Brazilian para taekwondo practitioner. He won the gold medal in the men's 61 kg event at the 2020 Summer Paralympics in Tokyo, Japan. In the final, his opponent Mohamed El-Zayat of Egypt was unable to compete due to injury and, as a result, Torquato was awarded the gold medal.

In 2019, he won the gold medal in the men's 61 kg event at the Parapan American Games held in Lima, Peru.
