= Nurcihan Ekinci =

Turkish Para Taekwondo practitioner (born 1988)

Personal information
- Full name: Nurcihan Ekinci Gül
- Born: 1 February 1988 (age 38) Tatvan, Bitlis, Turkey

Sport
- Sport: Para Taekwondo
- Disability class: K44
- Event: −47 kg
Medal record
Para Taekwondo
Representing Turkey
World Championships
Silver medal – second place	2021 Istanbul	K44 -47 kg
European Championships
Gold medal – first place	2022 Manchester	K44 -47 kg
Silver medal – second place	2026 Munich	K44 −47 kg
Bronze medal – third place	2021 Istanbul	K44 -47 kg
Bronze medal – third place	2024 Belgrade	K44 −47 kg
European Para Championships
Silver medal – second place	2023 Rotterdam	K44 -47 kg

Nurcihan Ekinci Gül (born Nurcihan Ekinci; 1 February 1988) is a Turkish European champion Para Taekwondo practitioner. She competes in the K44 event of the −47 kg class.

== Sport career ==
Ekinci took the bronze medal at the 2021 European Para Taekwondo Championships held in Istanbul, Turkey. At the 9th World Para Taekwondo Championships, she became silver medalist. She won the gold medal at the 2022 European Taekwondo Championships in Manchester, United Kingdom. She won the silver medal at the 2023 European Para Championships in Rotterdam, Netherlands.

== Personal life ==
Nurcihan Ekinci, born ğn 1 February 1988 and living in Tatvan of Bitlis Province, lost her left arm at an early age after she fell from high above. In 2013, she began with taekwondo motivated by her school teacher. She is a student at the Fırat University in Elazığ, Turkey. She is also a member of the Turkey national kickboxing team.
