= Ganbatyn Bolor-Erdene =

Mongolian parataekwondo practitioner

Personal information
- Native name: Ганбатын Болор-Эрдэнэ
- Nationality: Mongolia
- Born: 26 March 1995 (age 31) Ulaanbaatar, Mongolia
- Height: 175 cm (5 ft 9 in)

Sport
- Country: Mongolia
- Sport: Para Taekwondo
- Disability class: F44
- Weight class: 61 kg

Achievements and titles
- Paralympic finals: (silver) (2024)
- World finals: (gold) (2014) (2015) (2017) (2019) (2021)
- Regional finals: (gold) (2023)
Medal record
Men's Para Taekwondo
Representing Mongolia
Paralympic Games
Silver medal – second place	2024 Paris	-63 kg
World Para Championships
Gold medal – first place	2021 Istanbul	-63 kg
Gold medal – first place	2019 Antalya	-61 kg
Gold medal – first place	2017 London	-61 kg
Gold medal – first place	2015 Samsun	-61 kg
Gold medal – first place	2014 Moscow	-61 kg
Bronze medal – third place	2023 Veracruz	-63 kg
Asian Para Games
Gold medal – first place	2022 Hangzhou	-63kg
Gold medal – first place	2026 Aichi-Nagoya	-63kg
Asian Para Championships
Gold medal – first place	2024 Da Nang	-63 kg
Gold medal – first place	2016 Dhaka	-61 kg
Gold medal – first place	2015 Taipei	-61 kg
Silver medal – second place	2021 Beirut	-61 kg
Bronze medal – third place	2019 Amman	-61 kg
European Para Championships
Gold medal – first place	2024 Belgrade	-63kg
Bronze medal – third place	2018 Plovdiv	-61kg

Ganbatyn Bolor-Erdene (Mongolian: Ганбатын Болор-Эрдэнэ; born 26 March 1995), also commonly known as Bolor-Erdene Ganbat, is a Mongolian parataekwondo practitioner. He will compete at the 2020 Summer Paralympics in the 61 kg category, having qualified via World Ranking.
