= Ayoub Adouich =

Moroccan parataekwondo practitioner (born 1995)

Personal information
- Nationality: Moroccan
- Born: 28 December 1996 (age 29)

Sport
- Sport: Para taekwondo
- Disability class: K44
- Weight class: –63 kg
Medal record
Men's para taekwondo
Representing Morocco
Paralympic Games
Bronze medal – third place	2024 Paris	−63 kg

Ayoub Adouich (born 28 December 1996) is a Moroccan para taekwondo practitioner. He represented Morocco at the 2024 Summer Paralympics.

== Career ==
Adouich represented Morocco at the 2024 Summer Paralympics and won a bronze medal in the −63 kg category. This was Morocco's first ever medal in para-taekwondo.
