= Asadbek Toshtemirov =

Uzbekistani parataekwondo practitioner (born 2002)

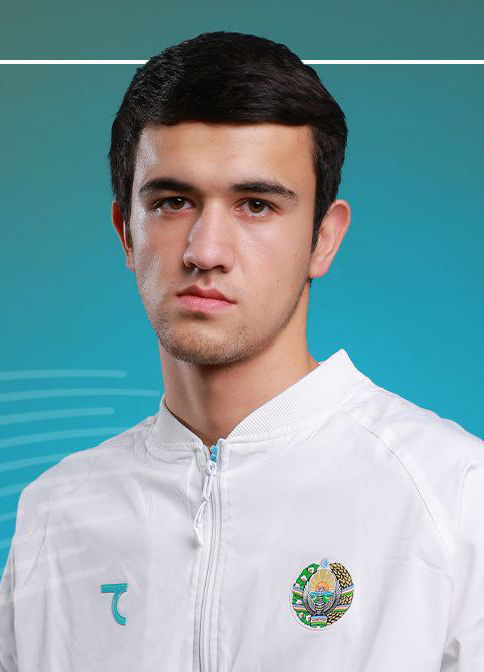

Personal information
- Nationality: Uzbekistan
- Born: 16 February 2002 (age 24)

Sport
- Country: Uzbekistan
- Sport: Para Taekwondo
- Disability class: F44
- Weight class: -80kg
Medal record
Men's Para Taekwondo
Representing Uzbekistan
Paralympic Games
Gold medal – first place	2024 Paris	-80 kg
World Championships
Gold medal – first place	2023 Veracruz	-80 kg
European Championships
Silver medal – second place	2022 Manchester	-80 kg
Asian Para Games
Bronze medal – third place	2022 Hangzhou	-80 kg

Asadbek Toshtemirov (born 16 February 2002) is an Uzbekistani para-taekwondo practitioner who competes in the F44 classification in the -80 kg category. He is a gold medalist at the 2023 World Para Taekwondo Championships, silver medalist at the 2022 European Taekwondo Championships and bronze medalist at the 2022 Asian Para Games. Since 2018, he has been a member of the Uzbekistan national team in para taekwondo.

== Career ==
Toshtemirov competed in the 2022 European Taekwondo Championships, where he lost to Joseph Lane and won the silver medal. At the 2022 Asian Para Games in October 2023, he won a bronze medal. At the World Championships in September 2023, he won his first gold medal in his weight category. At the 2023 World Taekwondo Grand Prix, he won a bronze medal in his weight class.

Toshtemirov won a bronze medal in the -80 kg weight category at the Asian Open Para Taekwondo Championship held in Da Nang, Vietnam on 16–21 May 2024. According to the final ranking results of the World Taekwondo Federation, he won a license for the 2024 Summer Paralympic Games in the -80 kg weight category.
