= Juan Diego García =

Mexican Paralympic taekwondo practitioner

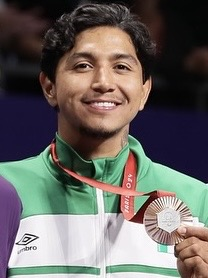
- García at the 2024 Summer Paralympics

Personal information
- Full name: Juan Diego García López
- Nationality: Mexican
- Born: 18 November 2002 (age 23) Culiacán, Sinaloa

Sport
- Country: Mexico
- Sport: Para taekwondo
- Disability: Amelia
- Disability class: K44
Medal record
Men's para taekwondo
Representing Mexico
Summer Paralympics
Gold medal – first place	2020 Tokyo	-75kg K44
Bronze medal – third place	2024 Paris	−70kg K44
Parapan American Games
Gold medal – first place	2019 Lima	-75kg K44
World Para Taekwondo Championships
Gold medal – first place	2019 Antalya	-75kg K44

Juan Diego García López (born 18 November 2002) is a Mexican para taekwondo practitioner. He represented Mexico in the 2020 Summer Paralympics, where he won a gold medal in the 75kg event. He also participated in the 2019 Parapan American Games, where he won a gold medal in the same category.
