= Imamaddin Khalilov =

Azerbaijani parataekwondo practitioner (born 1998)

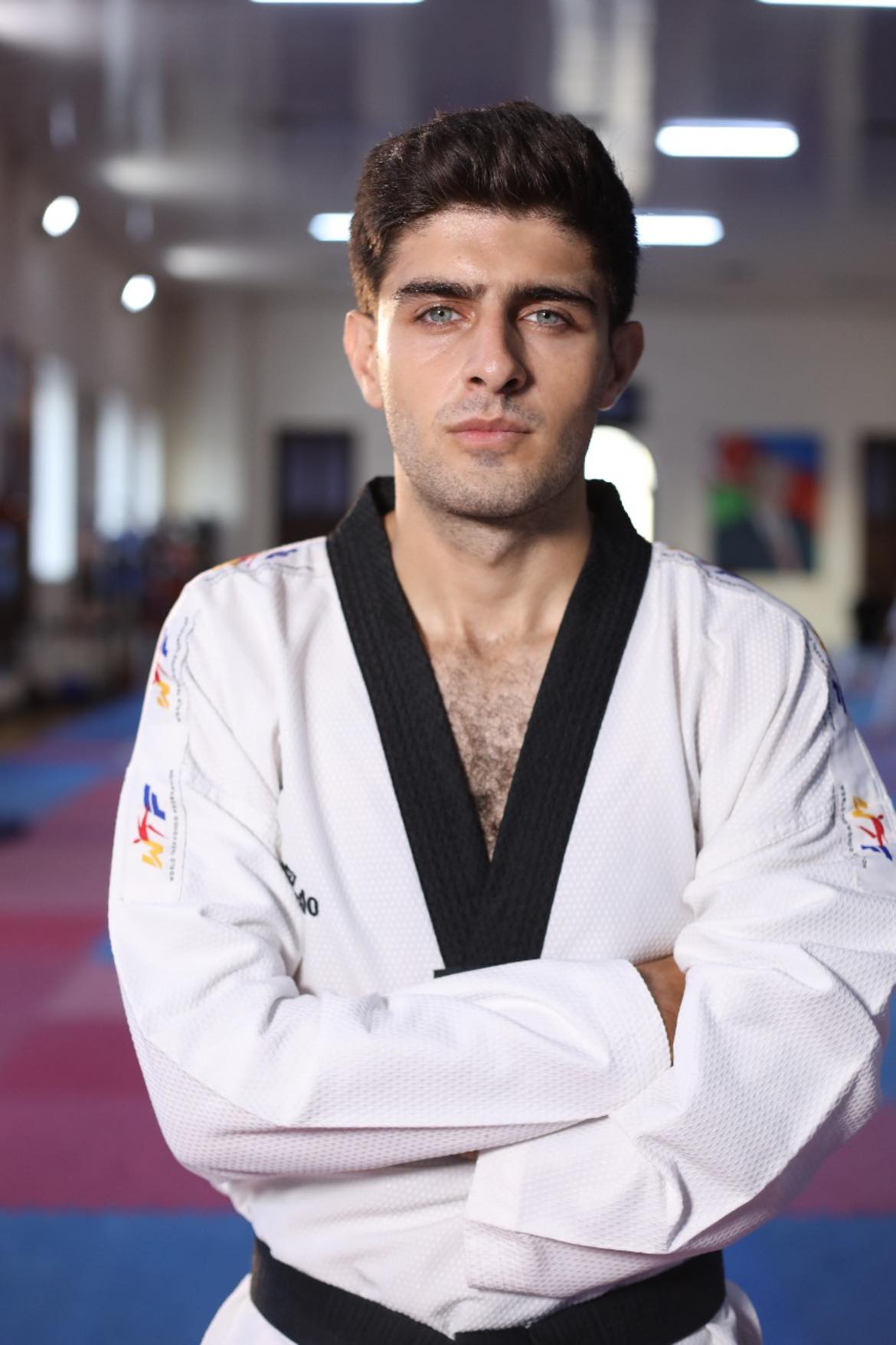

Personal information
- Nationality: Azerbaijani
- Born: 23 February 1998 (age 28)
- Home town: Ganja, Azerbaijan

Sport
- Sport: Para taekwondo
- Disability class: K44
- Event: –70 kg
Medal record
Men's para taekwondo
Representing Azerbaijan
Paralympic Games
Gold medal – first place	2024 Paris	−70 kg
World Para Championships
Gold medal – first place	2023 Veracruz	−70 kg
European Championships
Gold medal – first place	2024 Belgrade	−70 kg
Silver medal – second place	2022 Manchester	−70 kg
Silver medal – second place	2026 Munich	−70 kg
European Para Championships
Gold medal – first place	2023 Rotterdam	–70 kg

Imamaddin Khalilov (born 23 February 1998) is an Azerbaijani para taekwondo practitioner.

== Career ==
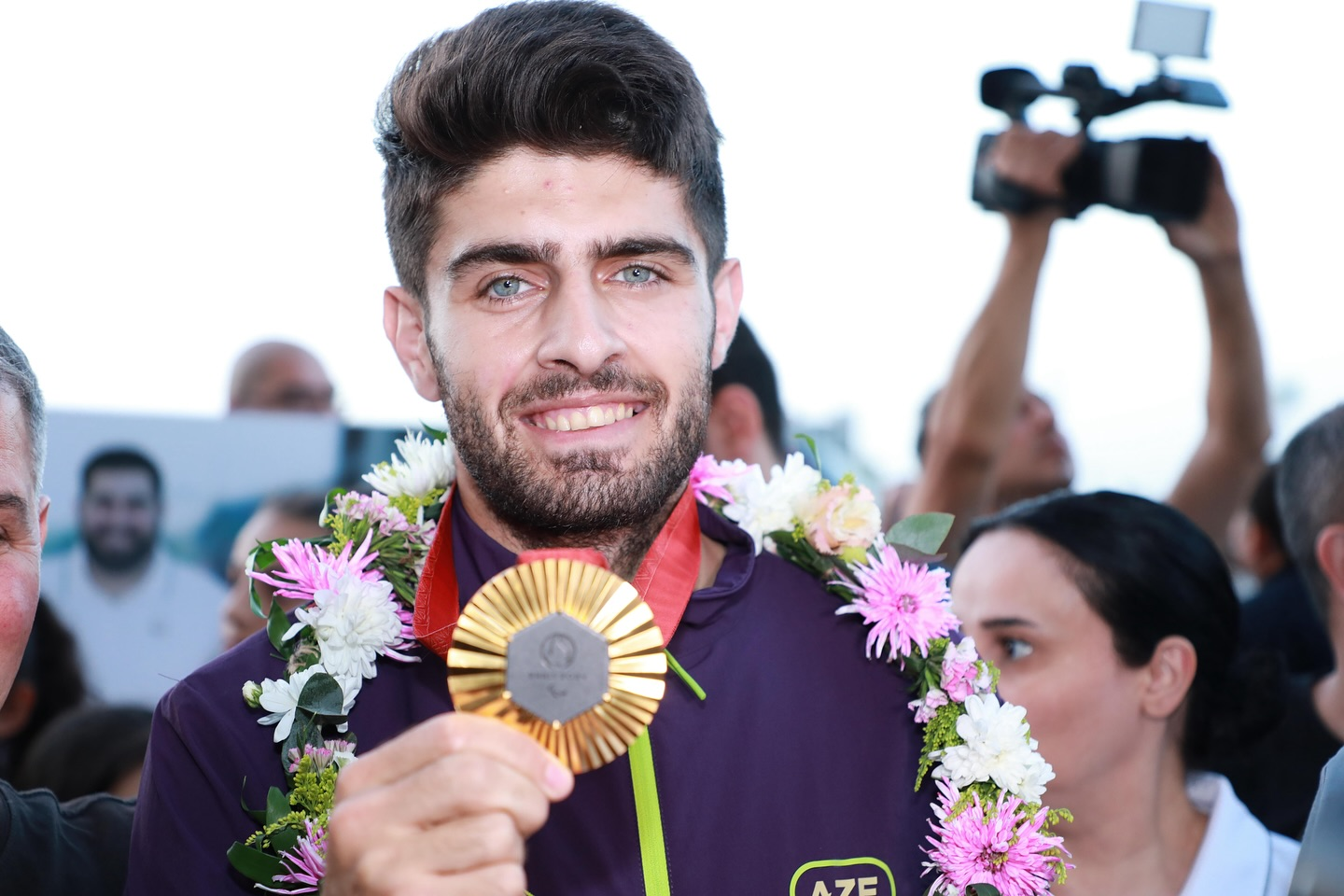
Khalilov with his gold medal from the 2024 Summer Paralympics

Khalilov competed at the 2022 European Taekwondo Championships and won a silver medal.

In August 2023, he competed at the 2023 European Para Championships and won a gold medal in the −70 kg category. In September 2023, he then competed at the World Para Taekwondo Championships and won a gold medal.

In May 2024, he competed at the 2024 European Taekwondo Championships and won a gold medal.

He served as a flag bearer for Azerbaijan during the 2024 Summer Paralympics Parade of Nations. He represented Azerbaijan at the 2024 Summer Paralympics and won a gold medal in the −70 kg category.

By the decree of President Ilham Aliyev dated September 10, 2024, Imameddin Khalilov was awarded 200,000 manats for securing first place at the 17th Summer Paralympic Games, while his coach received 100,000 manats. Additionally, by another decree of the president on the same date, he was awarded the 1st degree For Service to the Fatherland Order.

In May 2026, he competed at the 2026 European Taekwondo Championships and won a silver medal.
