= Joo Jeong-hun =

South Korean para taekwondo practitioner

Personal information
- Born: 13 February 1994 (age 32)

Sport
- Country: South Korea
- Sport: Para taekwondo
Medal record
Representing South Korea
Paralympic Games
Bronze medal – third place	2020 Tokyo	75 kg
Bronze medal – third place	2024 Paris	80 kg
Asian Para Games
Gold medal – first place	2022 Hangzhou	80 kg
European Championships
Gold medal – first place	2024 Belgrade	80 kg

Joo Jeong-hun (born 13 February 1994) is a South Korean para taekwondo practitioner. He won one of the bronze medals in the men's 75 kg event at the 2020 Summer Paralympics in Tokyo, Japan. He also won a bronze medal in the men's 80 kg event at the 2024 Summer Paralympics held in Paris, France.
