= Juan Samorano =

Argentine para taekwondo practitioner

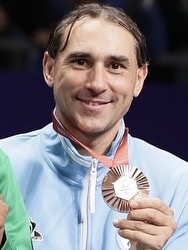
- Samorano at the 2024 Summer Paralympics

Personal information
- Born: 25 September 1981 (age 44) Merlo, Buenos Aires, Argentina

Sport
- Country: Argentine
- Sport: Para taekwondo
Medal record
Representing Argentina
Paralympic Games
Bronze medal – third place	2020 Tokyo	75 kg
Bronze medal – third place	2024 Paris	−70 kg
Parapan American Games
Gold medal – first place	2023 Santiago	70 kg
Bronze medal – third place	2019 Lima	75 kg

Juan Samorano (born 25 September 1981) is an Argentine para taekwondo practitioner. He won one of the bronze medals in the men's 75 kg event at the 2020 Summer Paralympics in Tokyo, Japan.

In 2019, he won one of the bronze medals in the men's 75 kg event at the Parapan American Games held in Lima, Peru.
