= Ali Can Özcan =

Turkish paralympic taekwondo practitioner

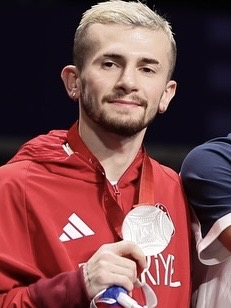
- Özcan at the 2024 Summer Paralympics

Personal information
- Born: 2000 or 2001 (age 24–25)

Sport
- Country: Turkey
- Sport: Para taekwondo
- Disability class: K44
- Weight class: 58 kg
Medal record
Para taekwondo
Representing Turkey
Paralympic Games
Silver medal – second place	2024 Paris	‍–‍58 kg
European Championships
Gold medal – first place	2022 Manchester	-58 kg
Gold medal – first place	2023 Rotterdam	-58 kg
Silver medal – second place	2021 Istanbul	-58 kg

Ali Can Özcan (born 2000/2001) (Note: Özcan is currently 23 years old in 2024) is a Turkish paralympic taekwondo practitioner. He competed at the 2022 European Taekwondo Championships, winning the gold medal in the K44 men's -58 kg event. He also won a silver medal for Turkey at the 2024 Summer Paralympics, losing to Asaf Yasur of Israel 19-12 in the final of the men’s -58kg weight class.
