= Daniil Sidorov =

Russian para taekwondo practitioner

Personal information
- Born: 7 February 1999 (age 27) Kokhma, Russia

Sport
- Country: Russia
- Sport: Para taekwondo
Medal record
Representing RPC
Paralympic Games
Bronze medal – third place	2020 Tokyo	61 kg
European Championships
Bronze medal – third place	2024 Belgrade	63 kg

Daniil Sidorov (born 7 February 1999) is a Russian para taekwondo practitioner. He won one of the bronze medals in the men's 61 kg event at the 2020 Summer Paralympics in Tokyo, Japan. He competed at the Summer Paralympics under the flag of the Russian Paralympic Committee.
