= European Para Youth Games =

Youth parasports competition in Europe

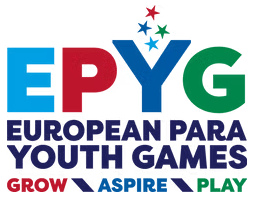
- Purpose: Multi-sport event for young athletes with physical disabilities from nations on the European continent
- Frequency: Usually every 2 years
- Inaugurated: 2011 European Para Youth Games Brno, Czech Republic
- Most recent: 2025 European Para Youth Games Istanbul, Turkey
- Headquarters: Vienna, Austria
- Website: https://www.europaralympic.org/games-events

The European Para Youth Games (EPYG) is a biennial multi-sport event for young para-athletes aged between 13 and 23 from the member countries of the European Paralympic Committee (EPC).

== Editions ==
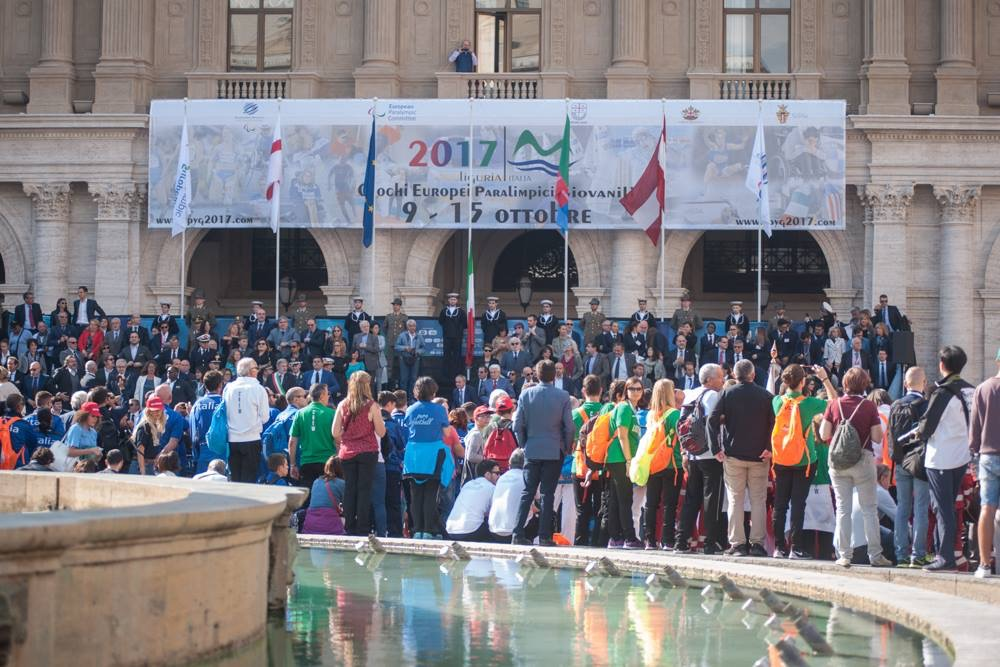
Opening ceremony of the 2017 European Para Youth Games, Genoa, Italy

=== Summer ===
#	Year	Host	Sports	Athletes	Countries	Champion
1	2011	Brno, Czech Republic	5	260	13	Czech Republic
2	2012	Brno, Czech Republic	4	347	14	Czech Republic
3	2015	Varaždin, Croatia	4	223	22	Spain
4	2017	Genoa, Italy	8	600	26	Germany
5	2019	Lahti, Finland	8	600+	27	Italy
6	2022	Lahti, Finland	8	415	28	Spain
7	2025	Istanbul, Turkey	9	640	33	Turkey

=== Winter ===
1. Czarna Góra, Poland - 2020
2. Nastola, Finland - 2022

== Summer Results ==
=== 2011 ===
5 Sports: Athletics, Boccia, Swimming, Table Tennis and Wheelchair Tennis.

Rank	Nation	Gold	Silver	Bronze	Total
1	Czech Republic	12	13	14	39
2	Poland	11	6	8	25
3	Croatia	10	5	2	17
4	Italy	8	6	8	22
5	Lithuania	5	6	4	15
6	Slovakia	4	4	0	8
7	Latvia	2	1	2	5
8	Russia	1	3	2	6
9	Bulgaria	1	3	0	4
10	Estonia	1	1	1	3
10	Germany	1	1	1	3
12	Austria	0	2	0	2
12	Montenegro	0	2	0	2
Totals (13 entries)		56	53	42	151

=== 2012 ===
347 athletes - 14 countries - athletics, boccia, swimming, table tennis.

Results:

=== 2015 ===
223 athletes - 22 countries - four sports. - athletics, boccia, swimming, table tennis.

Rank	Nation	Gold	Silver	Bronze	Total
1	Spain	29	13	19	61
2	Croatia	11	4	6	21
3	France	7	10	9	26
4	Portugal	6	5	2	13
5	Russia	5	5	1	11
6	Czech Republic	5	3	0	8
7	Slovenia	4	9	8	21
8	Ireland	4	0	1	5
9	Italy	3	9	4	16
10	Slovakia	2	2	3	7
11	Bulgaria	2	2	2	6
12	Germany	2	1	2	5
13	Serbia	1	3	0	4
14	Norway	1	2	2	5
15	Lithuania	0	4	1	5
16	Romania	0	3	0	3
17	Sweden	0	2	4	6
18	Austria	0	2	0	2
18	Montenegro	0	2	0	2
20	Hungary	0	1	1	2
Totals (20 entries)		82	82	65	229

=== 2017 ===
600 athletes - 26 countries - 8 sports: athletics, boccia, football 7-a-side, goalball, judo, sailing, swimming and table tennis.

Rank	Nation	Gold	Silver	Bronze	Total
1	Germany	37	27	12	76
2	Italy	29	30	15	74
3	Finland	9	8	0	17
4	France	9	4	5	18
5	Croatia	5	5	7	17
6	Czech Republic	5	2	6	13
7	Romania	4	4	1	9
8	Slovenia	4	3	2	9
9	Portugal	4	2	2	8
10	Estonia	4	1	2	7
11	Norway	3	3	4	10
12	Israel	3	2	3	8
13	Sweden	2	4	15	21
14	Turkey	2	4	1	7
15	Montenegro	2	2	0	4
16	Serbia	2	0	1	3
17	Slovakia	1	3	4	8
18	Lithuania	1	3	3	7
19	Great Britain	1	1	0	2
20	Austria	1	0	1	2
21	Bulgaria	1	0	0	1
22	Denmark	0	3	6	9
23	Spain	0	1	2	3
24	Belgium	0	0	1	1
24	Netherlands	0	0	1	1
Totals (25 entries)		129	112	94	335

=== 2019 ===
The 5th edition took place in Lathi, Finland between in 2019 in 8 sports.

8 Sports: Athletics, Boccia, Goalball, Judo, Showdown, Swimming, WB Basketball and Table Tennis.

Rank	Nation	Gold	Silver	Bronze	Total
1	Germany	19	14	14	47
2	Italy	15	15	14	44
3	France	14	12	16	42
4	Finland	8	6	5	19
5	Slovakia	5	1	2	8
6	Portugal	4	4	2	10
7	Austria	4	3	2	9
8	Belgium	4	2	2	8
9	Norway	3	1	5	9
10	Croatia	2	5	2	9
11	Sweden	2	4	4	10
12	Romania	2	1	0	3
13	Russia	1	4	2	7
14	Turkey	1	3	1	5
15	Slovenia	1	2	1	4
15	Spain	1	2	1	4
17	Montenegro	1	0	0	1
17	Netherlands	1	0	0	1
17	Poland	1	0	0	1
20	Bulgaria	0	2	0	2
21	Czech Republic	0	1	2	3
22	Estonia	0	1	1	2
22	Israel	0	1	1	2
24	Great Britain	0	0	1	1
24	Hungary	0	0	1	1
24	Ireland	0	0	1	1
Totals (26 entries)		89	84	80	253

=== 2022 ===
The 6th edition took place in Lathi, Finland between 27 June and 4 July 2022.

8 sports: athletics, swimming, table tennis, boccia, goalball, judo, wheelchair basketball and showdown.

29 nations - 415 athletes - more than 300 team staff participating - 8 sports - 7 days competitions.

Rank	Nation	Gold	Silver	Bronze	Total
1	Spain	23	20	10	53
2	France	17	16	14	47
3	Italy	13	14	15	42
4	Croatia	10	1	5	16
5	Germany	8	3	5	16
6	Portugal	8	2	3	13
7	Poland	7	5	4	16
8	Czech Republic	5	6	3	14
9	Norway	5	6	2	13
10	Belgium	4	5	4	13
11	Finland	2	5	4	11
12	Hungary	2	2	2	6
13	Sweden	2	1	3	6
14	Romania	2	0	0	2
15	Slovakia	1	2	1	4
16	Estonia	1	2	0	3
17	Bulgaria	1	1	2	4
18	Israel	1	1	0	2
19	Turkey	1	0	0	1
20	Greece	0	4	0	4
21	Great Britain	0	2	4	6
22	Denmark	0	2	2	4
23	Netherlands	0	1	0	1
24	Iceland	0	0	2	2
24	Lithuania	0	0	2	2
24	Slovenia	0	0	2	2
27	Montenegro	0	0	1	1
Totals (27 entries)		113	101	90	304

=== 2025 ===
The 7th edition took place between 24 and 27 July 2025 in Istanbul, Turkey.

Rank	NPC	Gold	Silver	Bronze	Total
1	Turkey (TUR)	22	33	22	77
2	Germany (GER)	21	16	11	48
3	Spain (ESP)	20	16	19	55
4	France (FRA)	14	10	8	32
5	Poland (POL)	13	11	7	31
6	Czech Republic (CZE)	13	1	7	21
7	Italy (ITA)	12	10	16	38
8	Croatia (CRO)	11	5	4	20
9	Greece (GRE)	6	6	8	20
10	Portugal (POR)	6	4	2	12
11	Ukraine (UKR)	5	3	0	8
12	Azerbaijan (AZE)	4	1	5	10
13	Slovakia (SVK)	3	3	1	7
14	Belgium (BEL)	3	2	3	8
15	Ireland (IRE)	3	2	1	6
16	Hungary (HUN)	2	1	6	9
17	Bosnia and Herzegovina (BIH)	2	1	1	4
18	Georgia (GEO)	2	1	0	3
19	Austria (AUT)	2	0	0	2
20	Lithuania (LTU)	1	3	1	5
21	Norway (NOR)	1	1	2	4
22	Great Britain (GBR)	1	0	8	9
23	Finland (FIN)	1	0	0	1
23	Sweden (SWE)	1	0	0	1
25	Estonia (EST)	0	4	2	6
26	Slovenia (SVN)	0	2	3	5
27	Netherlands (NED)	0	2	1	3
28	Romania (ROU)	0	1	1	2
29	Moldova (MDA)	0	1	0	1
30	Latvia (LAT)	0	0	1	1
31	Bulgaria (BUL)	0	0	0	0
31	Faroe Islands (FAR)	0	0	0	0
31	Montenegro (MNE)	0	0	0	0
Totals (33 entries)		169	140	140	449

== Winter Results ==
=== 2020 ===
150 para athletes competed in four sports: alpine skiing, snowboard, biathlon, and cross-country skiing.

=== 2022 ===
Biathlon, Alpine Ski, Cross-country skiing, Snowboard

== See also ==
- European Para Championships
- European Youth Olympic Festival
- European Games
