= Bopha Kong =

Vietnamese-born French parataekwondo practitioner

Personal information
- Born: 25 April 1981 (age 45) Vietnam

Sport
- Country: France
- Sport: Para Taekwondo
- Disability class: F43
- Weight class: 61 kg
Medal record
Men's Para Taekwondo
Representing France
World Championships
Gold medal – first place	2009 Baku	58 kg
Gold medal – first place	2010 St. Petersburg	58 kg
Gold medal – first place	2015 Samsun	61 kg
Gold medal – first place	2019 Antalya	61 kg
Silver medal – second place	2013 Lausanne	68 kg
Silver medal – second place	2017 London	61 kg
Bronze medal – third place	2012 Santa Cruz	58 kg
Bronze medal – third place	2014 Moscow	61 kg
European Championships
Gold medal – first place	2017 Sofia	61 kg
Gold medal – first place	2018 Plovdiv	61 kg
Silver medal – second place	2016 Warsaw	61 kg
Silver medal – second place	2019 Bari	61 kg
Bronze medal – third place	2021 Istanbul	58 kg

Bopha Kong (born 25 April 1981) is a Vietnamese-born French parataekwondo practitioner. He competed at the 2020 Summer Paralympics in the 61 kg category, having qualified via World Ranking.
