= 2025 European Para Youth Games =

Multi-sport event in Istanbul, Turkey

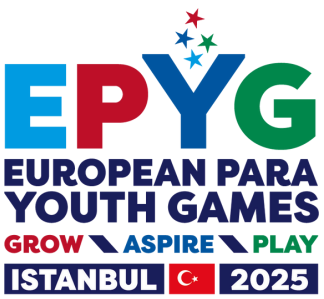
- Logo
- Host city: Istanbul, Turkey
- Nations: 33
- Athletes: 640
- Events: 9 sports
- Opening: 24 July 2025
- Closing: 27 July 2025
- Main venue: Cebeci Sports Complex

The 2025 European Para Youth Games were the 7th edition of the European Para Youth Games (EPYG), a multi-sport event for young para-athletes aged between 13 and 23 from the member countries of the European Paralympic Committee (EPC). They were held between 24 July and 27 July 2025 in Istanbul, Turkey.

== Bidding ==
In August 2023, seven countries were interested in hosting the 2025 European Para Youth Games. In February 2024, Portugal and Turkey submitted bids for the games. Istanbul was awarded hosting rights in July 2024.

== Mascot ==
In April 2025, the Turkish National Paralympic Committee chose the pet cat as mascot of the 2025 EPYG, and launched a poll to determine the name of its mascot and put four different names to the vote. Among the options, the common name "Pati" represents a paw that always extends towards love, and the name "Gli" (Glee) is inspired by the well-known house cat of Hagia Sophia in Istanbul. In addition to the name "Tekir", a common cat name in Turkey, the name "Tripod", inspired by the three-legged cat of Ankara, was put to the vote. Finally, "Gli" was chosen as the name of the mascot cat.

== Schedule ==
The competition schedule for the 2025 European Para Youth Games was as follows:

OC	Opening ceremony	CL	Classification	●	Event competit	CC	Closing ceremony

July	21 Mon	22 Tue	23 Wed	24 Thu	25 Fri	26 Sat	27 Sun
Ceremonies				OC			CC
* Para archery ()	CL	CL	●	●	●		
* Para-athletics ()		CL	CL	CL	●	●	
* Boccia ()		CL	CL		●	●	●
* Goalball ()		CL	CL	CL	●	●	
* Judo ()		CL	CL	CL	●	●	
* Para swimming ()		CL	CL	CL	●	●	●
* Table tennis ()			CL	CL	●	●	●
* Para taekwondo ()				CL	●	●	●
* Wheelchair basketball ()		CL	CL		●	●	●

== Sports ==
The following competitions took place:

2025 European Para Youth Games sports programme
- Para archery
- Para-athletics
- Boccia
- Goalball
- Judo
- Para swimming
- Table tennis
- Para taekwondo
- Wheelchair basketball

== Participating nations ==
33 National Paralympic Committees were expected to participate. Six countries, Azerbaijan, Bosnia and Herzegovina, Georgia, North Macedonia and Ukraine made their EPYG debuts at these games.

== Venues ==
The main stadiom of the 2025 European Para Youth Games is the Cebeci Sports Complex in Sultangazi, Istanbul.

== Medals table ==
Rank	NPC	Gold	Silver	Bronze	Total
1	Turkey (TUR)	22	33	22	77
2	Germany (GER)	21	16	11	48
3	Spain (ESP)	20	16	19	55
4	France (FRA)	14	10	8	32
5	Poland (POL)	13	11	7	31
6	Czech Republic (CZE)	13	1	7	21
7	Italy (ITA)	12	10	16	38
8	Croatia (CRO)	11	5	4	20
9	Greece (GRE)	6	6	8	20
10	Portugal (POR)	6	4	2	12
11	Ukraine (UKR)	5	3	0	8
12	Azerbaijan (AZE)	4	1	5	10
13	Slovakia (SVK)	3	3	1	7
14	Belgium (BEL)	3	2	3	8
15	Ireland (IRE)	3	2	1	6
16	Hungary (HUN)	2	1	6	9
17	Bosnia and Herzegovina (BIH)	2	1	1	4
18	Georgia (GEO)	2	1	0	3
19	Austria (AUT)	2	0	0	2
20	Lithuania (LTU)	1	3	1	5
21	Norway (NOR)	1	1	2	4
22	Great Britain (GBR)	1	0	8	9
23	Finland (FIN)	1	0	0	1
23	Sweden (SWE)	1	0	0	1
25	Estonia (EST)	0	4	2	6
26	Slovenia (SVN)	0	2	3	5
27	Netherlands (NED)	0	2	1	3
28	Romania (ROU)	0	1	1	2
29	Moldova (MDA)	0	1	0	1
30	Latvia (LAT)	0	0	1	1
31	Bulgaria (BUL)	0	0	0	0
31	Faroe Islands (FAR)	0	0	0	0
31	Montenegro (MNE)	0	0	0	0
Totals (33 entries)		169	140	140	449

== See also ==
- 2025 European Youth Summer Olympic Festival
