= Fatih Çelik =

Turkish Para Taekwondo practitioner

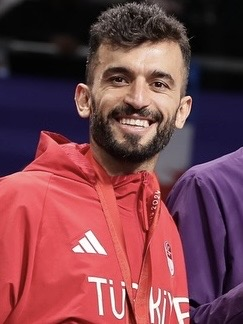

Personal information
- Born: 1 January 1992 (age 34)

Sport
- Country: Turkey
- Sport: Para taekwondo
Medal record
Representing Turkey
Paralympic Games
Para Taekwondo
Silver medal – second place	2024 Paris	−70 kg
European Championships
Gold medal – first place	2021 Istanbul	K44 70 kg
Silver medal – second place	2024 Belgrade	K44 70 kg

Fatih Çelik (born 1 January 1992) is a Turkish Para Taekwondo practitioner. He obtained a quota for participation at the 2020 Summer Paralympics in Tokyo, Japan.
