= Kazakhstan at the Paralympics =

- IPC code: KAZ
- NPC: National Paralympic Committee of Kazakhstan
- Medals: Gold 6 Silver 8 Bronze 7 Total 21

Summer appearances
- 1996; 2000; 2004; 2008; 2012; 2016; 2020; 2024

Winter appearances
- 1994; 1998; 2002; 2006; 2010; 2014; 2018; 2022; 2026

Other related appearances
- Soviet Union (1988); Unified Team (1992)

Kazakhstan, having become independent in 1991, made its Paralympic Games début at the 1994 Winter Paralympics in Lillehammer, with merely two athletes competing in cross-country skiing and biathlon. The country has competed in every edition of the Summer and Winter Paralympics since then. Kazakhstan has obtained only one Paralympic medal: a silver in cross-country skiing, won by Lubov Vorobieva during the country's inaugural participation in the Games in 1994. Along with Liechtenstein, Kazakhstan was the only participating country to have won a medal only at the Winter Paralympic Games, until end to 2016.

== Medals ==
=== Medals by Summer Games ===
Games	Athletes	Gold	Silver	Bronze	Total	Rank
(Italy) Rome 1960	did not participate					
(Japan) Tokyo 1964	did not participate					
(Israel) Tel Aviv 1968	did not participate					
(West Germany) Heidelberg 1972	did not participate					
(Canada) Toronto 1976	did not participate					
(Netherlands) Arnhem 1980	did not participate					
(United States) New York 1984	did not participate					
(South Korea) Seoul 1988	did not participate					
(Spain) Barcelona 1992	did not participate					
(United States) 1996 Atlanta	13	0	0	0	0	—
(Australia) 2000 Sydney	2	0	0	0	0	—
(Greece) 2004 Athens	8	0	0	0	0	—
(China) 2008 Beijing	3	0	0	0	0	—
(United Kingdom) 2012 London	7	0	0	0	0	—
(Brazil) 2016 Rio de Janeiro	11	1	1	0	2	58
(Japan) 2020 Tokyo	26	1	3	1	5	52
(France) 2024 Paris	44	2	3	4	9	39
Total (8/17)	70	4	7	5	16	79

=== Medals by Winter Games ===
Games	Athletes	Gold	Silver	Bronze	Total	Rank
(Sweden) Örnsköldsvik 1976	did not participate					
(Norway) Geilo 1980	did not participate					
(Austria) Innsbruck 1984	did not participate					
(Austria) Innsbruck 1988	did not participate					
(France) Albertville 1992	did not participate					
(Norway) 1994 Lillehammer	2	0	1	0	1	20
(Japan) 1998 Nagano	1	0	0	0	0	—
(United States) 2002 Salt Lake City	1	0	0	0	0	—
(Italy) 2006 Turin	2	0	0	0	0	—
(Canada) 2010 Vancouver	1	0	0	0	0	—
(Russia) 2014 Sochi	5	0	0	0	0	—
(South Korea) 2018 Pyeongchang	6	1	0	0	1	16
(China) 2022 Beijing	8	0	0	1	1	17
Total (8/13)	26	1	1	1	3	30

=== Medals by Summer Sport ===
Games	Gold	Silver	Bronze	Total
Powerlifting	2	1	0	3
Judo	1	4	3	8
Swimming	1	1	1	3
Shooting	0	1	0	1
Athletics	0	0	1	1
Total	4	7	5	16

=== Medals by Winter Sport ===
Games	Gold	Silver	Bronze	Total
Cross Country Skiing	1	1	0	2
Biathlon	0	0	1	1
Total	1	1	1	3

== Medallists ==
=== Summer Games ===
Medal	Name	Sport	Event	Date
Gold	Zulfiya Gabidullina	Swimming	Women's 100 metre freestyle S3	8 September 2016
Gold	David Degtyarev	Powerlifting	Men's 54 kg	26 August 2021
Gold	David Degtyarev	Powerlifting	Men's 54 kg	4 September 2024
Gold	Akmaral Nauatbek	Judo	48kg J2	5 September 2024
Silver	Raushan Koishibayeva	Powerlifting	Women's 67 kg	11 September 2016
Silver	Anuar Sariyev	Judo	Men's 60 kg	27 August 2021
Silver	Temirzhan Daulet	Judo	Men's 73 kg	28 August 2021
Silver	Zarina Baibatina	Judo	Women's +70 kg	29 August 2021
Silver	Yerkin Gabbasov	Shooting	R1 – 10 m air rifle standing SH1	29 August 2024
Silver	Nurdaulet Zhumagali	Swimming	100 m breaststroke SB13	5 September 2024
Silver	Yergali Shamey	Judo	73kg J1	6 September 2024
Bronze	Nurdaulet Zhumagali	Swimming	Men's 100 metre breaststroke SB13	1 September 2021
Bronze	Dastan Mukashbekov	Athletics	Men's shot put F36	4 September 2024
Bronze	Dayana Fedossova	Judo	57kg J2	6 September 2024

=== Winter Games ===
Medal	Name	Sport	Event	Date
Gold	Alexandr Kolyadin	Cross-country skiing	1.5km sprint classic standing	14 March 2018
Silver	Lubov Vorobieva	Cross-country skiing	Women's 10 km classical technique B2	13 March 1994
Bronze	Alexandr Gerlits	Biathlon	Biathlon at the 2022 Winter Paralympics – Men's 10 kilometres	8 March 2022

== See also ==
- Kazakhstan at the Olympics
- Kazakhstan at the Asian Games
- Kazakhstan at the Asian Para Games
- Kazakhstan at the 2022 Asian Para Games
- Kazakhstan at the 2018 Asian Para Games
- Kazakhstan at the 2014 Asian Para Games
- Kazakhstan at the 2010 Asian Para Games
- Asian Para Games
- Kazakhstan at the Deaflympics
