= Kazakhstan at the 2020 Summer Paralympics =

- IPC code: KAZ
- NPC: National Paralympic Committee of Kazakhstan

in Tokyo
- Competitors: 26 in 7 sports
- Medals: Gold 1 Silver 3 Bronze 1 Total 5

Summer Paralympics appearances (overview)
- 1996; 2000; 2004; 2008; 2012; 2016; 2020; 2024

Other related appearances
- Soviet Union (1988); Unified Team (1992)

Kazakhstan competed at the 2020 Summer Paralympics in Tokyo, Japan, from 24 August to 5 September 2021.

== Medalists ==
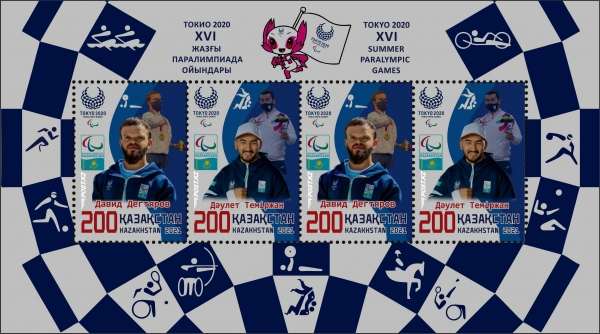
Miniature sheet of Kazakhstan

Medal	Name	Sport	Event	Date
Gold	David Degtyarev	Powerlifting	Men's 54 kg	26 August
Silver	Anuar Sariyev	Judo	Men's 60 kg	27 August
Silver	Temirzhan Daulet	Judo	Men's 73 kg	28 August
Silver	Zarina Baibatina	Judo	Women's +70 kg	29 August
Bronze	Nurdaulet Zhumagali	Swimming	Men's 100 metre breaststroke SB13	1 September

== Competitors ==
#	Sport	Men	Women	Total	Events
1	Athletics	1	1	2	3
2	Canoeing	1	0	1	1
3	Judo	5	2	7	7
4	Powerlifting	2	3	5	5
5	Shooting	0	1	1	1
6	Swimming	5	2	7	17
7	Taekwondo	2	1	3	3
Total		16	10	26	37

== Athletics ==
Number	Athlete	Event	Rank
Men
1	Dastan Mukashbekov	Men's Shot Put F36	6
Women
2	Saltanat Abilkhassymkyzy	Women's 100m T35	9
3	Saltanat Abilkhassymkyzy	Women's 200m T35	9

== Canoeing ==
Athlete	Event	Rank
Men
Bibarys Spatay	KL2	9

== Judo ==
Number	Athlete	Event	Rank
Men
1	Anuar Sariyev	Men's –60kg	2nd place, silver medalist(s)
2	Temirzhan Daulet	Men's –73kg	2nd place, silver medalist(s)
3	Galymzhan Smagululy	Men's –81kg	9
4	Zhanbota Amanzhol	Men's –90kg	5
5	Yerlan Utepov	Men's –100kg	9
Women
6	Dayana Fedossova	Women's –57kg	7
7	Zarina Baibatina	Women's +70kg	2nd place, silver medalist(s)

== Shooting ==
Athlete	Event	Rank
Aisulu Jumabayeva	10 m air pistol standing SH1	13

== Powerlifting ==
Athlete	Event	Result	Rank
Men
David Degtyarev	−54 kg	174	1st place, gold medalist(s)
Rakhmetzhan Khamayev	−88 kg	195	5
Women
Alina Solodukhina	−45 kg	83	5
Gulbanu Abdykhalykova	−50 kg	76	7
Raushan Koishibayeva	−67 kg	112	4

== Swimming ==
7 Kazakhstani swimmer has successfully entered the paralympic slot after breaking the MQS.

Number	Athlete	Event	Rank
Men
1	Nurdaulet Zhumagali	50 m freestyle S13	16
2	Nurdaulet Zhumagali	100 m breaststroke SB13	3rd place, bronze medalist(s)
3	Nurdaulet Zhumagali	200 m medley SM13	14
4	Siyazbek Daliyev	50 m freestyle S5	9
5	Siyazbek Daliyev	50 m backstroke S5	12
6	Siyazbek Daliyev	50 m butterfly S5	5
7	Roman Agalakov	50 m freestyle S13	15
8	Roman Agalakov	100 m butterfly S13	11
9	Yerzhan Salimgereyev	50 m butterfly S6	6
10	Yerzhan Salimgereyev	100 m freestyle S6	11
11	Nurali Sovetkanov	100 m breaststroke SB13	8
Women
12	Aliya Rakhimbekova	100 m backstroke S12	8
13	Aliya Rakhimbekova	100 m freestyle S12	10
14	Aliya Rakhimbekova	100 m breaststroke SB12	7
15	Zulfiya Gabidullina	50 m backstroke S4	15
16	Zulfiya Gabidullina	50 m freestyle S4	8
17	Zulfiya Gabidullina	150 m medley SM4	15

== Taekwondo ==
Kazakhstan qualified three athletes to compete at the Paralympics competition. Nurlan Dombayev (men's 75 kg) qualified by finishing first at world rankings K43 to booked one ticket. Meanwhile Nyshan Omirali (men's +75 kg) and Kamilya Dosmalova (women's 58 kg) qualified by winning the gold medal at the 2021 Asian Qualification Tournament in Amman, Jordan.

Athlete	Event	Rank
Men
Nurlan Dombayev	Men's –75 kg	5
Nyshan Omirali	Men's +75 kg	7
Women
Kamilya Dosmalova	Women's 58 kg	9

== See also ==
- Kazakhstan at the Paralympics
- Kazakhstan at the 2020 Summer Olympics
