= Kazakhstan at the 2024 Summer Paralympics =

- IPC code: KAZ
- NPC: National Paralympic Committee of Kazakhstan

in Paris, France August 28, 2024 – September 8, 2024
- Competitors: 44 in 9 sports
- Flag bearers: Sevda Aliyeva; Berik Izmaganbetov
- Medals Ranked 39th: Gold 2 Silver 3 Bronze 4 Total 9

Summer Paralympics appearances (overview)
- 1996; 2000; 2004; 2008; 2012; 2016; 2020; 2024

Other related appearances
- Soviet Union (1988); Unified Team (1992)

Kazakhstan competed at the 2024 Summer Paralympics in Paris, France, from 28 August to 8 September.

== Medalists ==
Medal	Name	Sport	Event	Date
Gold	David Degtyarev	Powerlifting	Men's 54 kg	4 September
Gold	Akmaral Nauatbek	Judo	48kg J2	5 September
Silver	Yerkin Gabbasov	Shooting	R1 – 10 m air rifle standing SH1	29 August
Silver	Nurdaulet Zhumagali	Swimming	100 m breaststroke SB13	5 September
Silver	Yergali Shamey	Judo	73kg J1	6 September
Bronze	Dastan Mukashbekov	Athletics	Men's shot put F36	4 September
Bronze	Dayana Fedossova	Judo	57kg J2	6 September
Bronze	Zarina Raifova	Judo	+90kg J2	7 September
Bronze	Zhurkamyrza Shukurbekov	Judo	+90kg J2	7 September

== Competitors ==
The following is the list of number of competitors in the Games.

Sport	Men	Women	Total
Athletics	2	2	4
Parajudo	5	5	10
Paracanoeing	1	1	2
Powerlifting	3	2	5
Shooting	1	1	2
Sitting volleyball	12	0	12
Swimming	3	1	4
Table tennis	1	0	1
Taekwondo	2	2	4
Total	30	14	44

== Athletics ==
Kazakhstan entered four para-athletics (two men, two women) after achieved quota places for the following events by virtue of their best finishes at the 2023 World Championships, 2024 World Championships, or through high performance allocation, as long as they meet the minimum entry standard (MES).

Key

- Note–Ranks given for track events are within the athlete's heat only
- Q = Qualified for the next round
- q = Qualified for the next round as a fastest loser or, in field events, by position without achieving the qualifying target
- DQ = Disqualified
- PR = Paralympic Record
- AR = Area (or continental) Record
- NR = National Record
- SB = Season's Best
- N/A = Round not applicable for the event
- Bye = Athlete not required to compete in round

Field events

Athlete	Event	Final	
Athlete	Event	Distance	Position
Dastan Mukashbekov	Men's shot put F36	16.00 AR	3rd place, bronze medalist(s)
Zholaman Elaman	Men's shot put F35	11.56 SB	7
Gulbakyt Kayyrzhanova	Women's Javelin Throw F13	34.23 SB	5

Women's track

Athlete	Event	Final	
Athlete	Event	Time	Rank
Saltanat Abylkasymkyzy	Women's 100 m T35	16.52	9

== Parajudo ==
Athlete	Event	Round of 16	Quarterfinals	Semifinals	Repechage	Final / BM	
Athlete	Event	Opposition Result	Opposition Result	Opposition Result	Opposition Result	Opposition Result	Rank
Yergali Shamey	73kg J1	Bye	Armindo Rodrigues (FRA); W 10–00	Sass Lennart (GER); W 10–01	—N/a	Alex Bologa (ROU); L 00–10	2nd place, silver medalist(s)
Bauyrzhan Arstanbekov	90kg J1	Gholamishafia Mousa (IRI); L 00–10	Did not advance				
Yerlan Utepov	+90kg J1	Bye	Silva De Araujo Wilians (BRA); L 00–10	—N/a	Tastan Onur (TUR); L 00–10	Did not advance	7
Galymzhan Smagululy	+90kg J2	Kizilashvili Lasha (GEO); L 00–10	Did not advance				
Zhurkamyrza Shukurbekov	+90kg J2	Bye	Fernandes Junior Sergio (BRA); W 10–00	Chikoidze Revaz (GEO); L 00–10	—N/a	Nacer Zorgani (FRA); W 11–00	3rd place, bronze medalist(s)
Akmaral Nauatbek	48kg J2	Bye	Kokila (IND); W 10–00	Eke C (TUR); W 11–00	—N/a	Sandrine Martinet (FRA); W 10–00	1st place, gold medalist(s)
Alfia Tlekkabyl	57kg J1	Cernei I (MDA); W 10–00	Havrysiuk A (UKR); L 00–10	—N/a	Paula Gómez (ARG); L 00–10	Did not advance	7
Dayana Fedossova	57kg J2	Bye	Da silva TEIXEIRA ARAUJO LUCIA (BRA); W 10–00	Hirose Junko (JPN); L 00–10	—N/a	Döndü Yeşilyurt (TUR); W 11–00	3rd place, bronze medalist(s)
Ayala Mereke	70kg J2	Bye	Ogawa K (JPN); L 00–10	—N/a	Bye	Ina Kaldani (GEO); L 00–01	5
Zarina Raifova	+70kg J2	Bye	WANG HONGYU (CHN); L 00–10	—N/a	Taylor Gosens (AUS); W 10–00	Carolina Costa (ITA); W 10–00	3rd place, bronze medalist(s)

== Paracanoeing ==
Kazakhstan earned quota places for the following events through the 2023 ICF Canoe Sprint World Championships in Duisburg, Germany; and 2024 ICF Canoe Sprint World Championships in Szeged, Hungary.

- FB= Final B
- FA= Final A

Athlete	Event	Heats		Semifinal		Final	
Athlete	Event	Time	Rank	Time	Rank	Time	Rank
Bibarys Spatay	Men's KL2	45.80	5	45.47 FB	4	45.17	11
Zhanyl Baltabayeva	Women's VL3	1:04.72	5	1:02.13 FB	5	1:02.57	10

== Powerlifting ==
Athlete	Event	Final / BM	
Athlete	Event	Result	Rank
David Degtyarev	Men's 54 kg	188 kg	1st place, gold medalist(s)
Stanislaw Shakiyev	Men's 59 kg	178 kg	7
Rakhmetzhan Khamayev	Men's 88 kg	200 kg	6
Tursynay Kabyl	Women's 45 kg	95 kg	6
Raushan Koishibayeva	Women's 73 kg	117 kg	4

== Shooting ==
Kazakhstan entered two para-shooters (one men, one woman) after achieved quota places for the following events by virtue of their best finishes at the 2022, 2023 and 2024 world cup, 2022 World Championships, 2023 World Championships and 2022 Asian Para Games, as long as they obtained a minimum qualifying score (MQS) by July 15, 2024.

Men

Athlete	Event	Qualification		Final	
Athlete	Event	Points	Rank	Points	Rank
Yerkin Gabbasov	R1 – 10 m air rifle standing SH1	619.5	6 Q	247.7	2nd place, silver medalist(s)
Yerkin Gabbasov	R3 - Mixed 10m air rifle prone SH1	624.3	35	Did not advance	

Women

Athlete	Event	Qualification		Final	
Athlete	Event	Points	Rank	Points	Rank
Sevda Aliyeva	P2 – 10 metre air pistol SH1	546-7x	13	Did not advance	

== Sitting volleyball ==
Kazakhstan men's sitting volleyball team qualified for the Paralympic games by virtue of the highest eligible rank nation's at the 2023 Asia and Oceania Sitting Volleyball Championships held in Astana.

Summary

Team	Event	Group stage				Semifinal	Final / BM / Cl.	
Team	Event	Opposition Score	Opposition Score	Opposition Score	Rank	Opposition Score	Opposition Score	Rank
Kazakhstan	Men's tournament	France; W 3–0	Bosnia and Herzegovina; L 2–3	Egypt; L 1–3	3	—N/a	Brazil; W 3–0	5

== Swimming ==
Kazakhstan entered four swimmers (three men and one woman), to compete at Paris 2024, by viryue of the results at the 2023 World Para Swimming Championships after finishing in the top two places in Paralympic class disciplines; and through the Minimum Qualification Standard (MQS) allocation slots.

Key

- Note–Ranks given for track events are within the athlete's heat only
- Q = Qualified for the next round
- q = Qualified for the next round as a fastest loser or, in field events, by position without achieving the qualifying target
- DQ = Disqualified
- PR = Paralympic Record
- AR = Area (or continental) Record
- NR = National Record
- SB = Season's Best
- N/A = Round not applicable for the event
- Bye = Athlete not required to compete in round

Men

Athlete	Events	Heats		Final	
Athlete	Events	Time	Rank	Time	Rank
Siyazbek Daliyev	50 m backstroke S5	40.14	10	Did not advance	
Siyazbek Daliyev	50 m butterfly S5	36.42 Q	8	36.35	7
Amir Muratbekov	100 m breaststroke SB11	1:21.66 Q	7	1:20.02	7
Nurdaulet Zhumagali	100 m breaststroke SB13	1:05.11 AS Q	2	1:04.83 PR	2nd place, silver medalist(s)
Nurdaulet Zhumagali	200 m Individual medley SB13	2:20.31	10	Did not advance	

Women

Athlete	Events	Heats		Final	
Athlete	Events	Time	Rank	Time	Rank
Zulfiya Gabidulina	50 m breaststroke SB3	1:12.07	10	Did not advance	
Zulfiya Gabidulina	50m Freestyle S4	42.85 Q	7	43.75	7
Zulfiya Gabidulina	150 m Individual medley SM4	3:52.40	10	Did not advance	

== Table tennis ==
Athlete	Event	First round	Second round	Quarterfinals	Semifinals	Final / BM	
Athlete	Event	Opposition Result	Opposition Result	Opposition Result	Opposition Result	Opposition Result	Rank
Ali Makhulbekov	Individual C8	Ledoux M (BEL); L 1–3	Did not advance				

== Taekwondo ==
Kazakhstan entered three athletes to compete at the Paralympics competition. All of them qualified for Paris 2024, by virtue of finishing within the top six in the Paralympic rankings in their respective class.

Athlete	Event	First round	Quarterfinals	Semifinals	Repechage	Final / BM	
Athlete	Event	Opposition Result	Opposition Result	Opposition Result	Opposition Result	Opposition Result	Rank
Nurlan Dombayev	Men's –80 kg	Ismaili (MAR); W 12–7	Alireza Bakht (IRI); L 5–7	—N/a	Andrees Molina (CRC); W 18-7	Joo Jeong-hun (KOR); L 1-7	5
Nyshan Omirali	Men's +80 kg	Shekha (IRQ); RSC 8–11	Evan Medell (USA); L 3–13	—N/a	Ivan Mikulić (CRO); W 24-8	Hamed Haghshenas (IRI); L 14-16	5
Milana Krassavtseva	Women's –52 kg	Geraldo (DOM); W 10–8	Jessica Garcia Quijano (MEX); L 8–10	—N/a	Salma Moneem Hassan (EGY); L 1–8	—N/a	7
Kamilya Dosmalova	Women's –57 kg	Bye	Marija Mičev (SRB); L 0–5	—N/a	Irene Mar (FIJ); W 12–6	Silvana Fernandes (BRA); L 3–28	5

== See also ==
- Kazakhstan at the 2024 Summer Olympics
