= Kazakhstan at the 2014 Winter Paralympics =

- IPC code: KAZ
- NPC: National Paralympic Committee of Kazakhstan

in Sochi
- Competitors: 5 in 2 sports
- Flag bearer: Yerlan Omarov
- Medals: Gold 0 Silver 0 Bronze 0 Total 0

Winter Paralympics appearances (overview)
- 1994; 1998; 2002; 2006; 2010; 2014; 2018; 2022; 2026

Other related appearances
- Soviet Union (1988); Unified Team (1992)

Kazakhstan competed at the 2014 Winter Paralympics in Sochi, Russia, held between 7–16 March 2014.

== Biathlon ==
Men

Athlete	Events	Final				
Athlete	Events	Real Time	Calculated Time	Missed Shots	Result	Rank
Kairat Kanafin; Guide: Dmitriy Kolomeyets	7.5km, visually impaired	29:52.1	29:16.3	4+2	29:16.3	17

== Cross-country skiing ==
Men

Athlete	Event	Qualification			Semifinal		Final		
Athlete	Event	Real Time	Result	Rank	Result	Rank	Real Time	Result	Rank
Kairat Kanafin; Guide: Dmitriy Kolomeyet	1km sprint classic, visually impaired	4:36.37	4:30.84	13	did not qualify				
Kairat Kanafin; Guide: Dmitriy Kolomeyet	10km free, visually impaired	—N/a					31:12.8	30:35.3	17
Alexandr Kolyadin	1km sprint classic, standing	5:08.29	4:59.04	33	did not qualify				
Alexandr Kolyadin	20km, standing	—N/a					1:06:40.3	1:04:00.3	13
Yerlan Omarov	1km sprint classic, standing	5:34.28	5:07.54	35	did not qualify				
Yerlan Omarov	10km free, standing	—N/a					36:19.9	33:25.5	38

Women

Athlete	Event	Qualification			Semifinal		Final		
Athlete	Event	Real Time	Result	Rank	Result	Rank	Real Time	Result	Rank
Zhanyl Baltabayeva	1km sprint classic, sitting	3:35.74	3:35.74	23	did not qualify				
Zhanyl Baltabayeva	5km, sitting	—N/a					26:11.5	26:11.5	23
Yelena Mazurenko	1km sprint classic, standing	8:04.27	7:44.90	16	did not qualify				
Yelena Mazurenko	5km, standing	—N/a					30:09.8	28:57.4	18

Relay

Athletes	Event	Final	
Athletes	Event	Time	Rank
Zhanyl Baltabayeva; Kairat Kanafin; Guide: Dmitriy Kolomeyet; Alexandr Kolyadin	4 x 2.5km open relay	32:48.8	10

== See also ==
- Kazakhstan at the Paralympics
- Kazakhstan at the 2014 Winter Olympics
