= Kazakhstan at the 2026 Winter Paralympics =

- Flag of Kazakhstan
- IPC code: KAZ
- NPC: National Paralympic Committee of Kazakhstan

in Milan & Cortina d'Ampezzo, Italy 6 March 2026 – 15 March 2026
- Competitors: 7 (6 men and 1 woman) in 2 sports
- Flag bearer (opening): Nurlan Alimov
- Flag bearer (closing): Volunteer
- Medals Ranked 18th: Gold 1 Silver 0 Bronze 1 Total 2

Winter Paralympics appearances (overview)
- 1994; 1998; 2002; 2006; 2010; 2014; 2018; 2022; 2026

Other related appearances
- Soviet Union (1988); Unified Team (1992)

Kazakhstan competed at the 2026 Winter Paralympics in Milan & Cortina d'Ampezzo, Italy, which took place between 6–15 March 2026.

== Medallists ==
Medal	Name	Sport	Event	Date
Gold	Yerbol Khamitov	Para biathlon	Men's sprint pursuit, sitting	13 March
Bronze	Yerbol Khamitov	Para cross-country skiing	Men's sprint, sitting	10 March

== Competitors ==
The following is the list of number of competitors participating at the Games per sport/discipline.

Sport	Men	Women	Total
Para biathlon	6	1	7
Para cross-country skiing	6	1	7
Total	6	1	7

== Para biathlon ==
Athlete	Class	Event	Qualification			Final		
Athlete	Class	Event	Missed shots	Time	Rank	Missed shots	Time	Rank
Yuriy Berezin	LW12	Men's individual, sitting	—N/a			5 (3+0+0+2)	45:01.6	22
Yuriy Berezin	LW12	Men's sprint, sitting	—N/a			5 (2+3)	25:40.9	25
Yuriy Berezin	LW12	Men's sprint pursuit, sitting	0	9:49.9	17 Q	2 (2+0)	13:09.4	19
Alexandr Gerlits	LW6	Men's individual, standing	—N/a			3 (0+0+2+1)	33:19.8	9
Alexandr Gerlits	LW6	Men's sprint, standing	—N/a			3 (2+1)	19:17.9	11
Alexandr Gerlits	LW6	Men's sprint pursuit, standing	4 (1+3)	10:53.3	11 Q	2 (1+1)	12:30.4	9
Yerbol Khamitov	LW12	Men's individual, sitting	—N/a			2 (0+0+1+1)	37:24.4	6
Yerbol Khamitov	LW12	Men's sprint, sitting	—N/a			1 (1+0)	20:47.2	8
Yerbol Khamitov	LW12	Men's sprint pursuit, sitting	0	8:27.9	1 Q	1 (0+1)	9:39.0	1st place, gold medalist(s)
Sergey Ussoltsev	LW12	Men's individual, sitting	—N/a			4 (0+2+1+1)	45:01.1	21
Sergey Ussoltsev	LW12	Men's sprint, sitting	—N/a			0 (0+0)	23:12.4	18
Sergey Ussoltsev	LW12	Men's sprint pursuit, sitting	0	10:00.0	20 Q	5 (2+3)	14:22.9	23

== Para cross-country skiing ==
Men

Athlete	Class	Event	Qualification		Semifinal		Final	
Athlete	Class	Event	Time	Rank	Time	Rank	Time	Rank
Nurlan Alimov	LW6	Sprint classical, standing	2:37.60	13	Did not advance			
Nurlan Alimov	LW6	10 km classical, standing	—N/a				29:25.4	8
Nurlan Alimov	LW6	20 km freestyle, standing	—N/a				47:35.8	16
Yuriy Berezin	LW12	Sprint, sitting	2:36.18	31	Did not advance			
Yuriy Berezin	LW12	10 km, sitting	—N/a				28:35.1	21
Alexandr Gerlits	LW6	20 km freestyle, standing	—N/a				43:39.5	4
Yerbol Khamitov	LW12	Sprint, sitting	2:14.47	6 Q	2:38.1	1 Q	2:29.9	3rd place, bronze medalist(s)
Yerbol Khamitov	LW12	10 km, sitting	—N/a				25:27.4	8
Yerbol Khamitov	LW12	20 km, sitting	—N/a				53:54.2	7
Vladislav Kobal	LW8	Sprint classical, standing	2:40.68	15	Did not advance			
Vladislav Kobal	LW8	10 km classical, standing	—N/a				30:07.7	10
Vladislav Kobal	LW8	20 km freestyle, standing	—N/a				45:01.8	8
Sergey Ussoltsev	LW12	10 km, sitting	—N/a				27:50.2	19

Women

Athlete	Class	Event	Qualification		Semifinal		Final	
Athlete	Class	Event	Time	Rank	Time	Rank	Time	Rank
Anna Grachova; Guide: Yermek Ormantayev	NS3	Sprint classical, visually impaired	4:20.67	12	Did not advance			
Anna Grachova; Guide: Yermek Ormantayev	NS3	10 km classical, visually impaired	—N/a				48:10.0	11
Anna Grachova; Guide: Yermek Ormantayev	NS3	20 km freestyle, visually impaired	—N/a				DNS	

Relay

Athletes	Event	Time	Rank
Yerbol Khamitov; Vladislav Kobal; Alexandr Gerlits	4 × 2.5km open relay	23:18.5	5

== See also ==
- Kazakhstan at the Paralympics
- Kazakhstan at the 2026 Winter Olympics
