= Swimming at the 2020 Summer Paralympics – Women's 50 metre freestyle S4 =

Women's 50 metre freestyle S4 at the XVI Paralympic Games
- Venue: Tokyo Aquatics Centre
- Dates: 2 September 2021
- Competitors: 14 from 12 nations

Medalists
1st place, gold medalist(s)		Rachael Watson	Australia
2nd place, silver medalist(s)		Arjola Trimi	Italy
3rd place, bronze medalist(s)		Marta Fernández Infante	Spain

The Women's 50 metre freestyle S4 event at the 2020 Paralympic Games took place on 2 September 2021, at the Tokyo Aquatics Centre.

== Heats ==
The swimmers with the top eight times, regardless of heat, advanced to the final.

Rank	Heat	Lane	Name	Nationality	Time	Notes
1	2	3	Marta Fernández Infante	Spain	41.39	Q
2	2	5	Patrícia Pereira	Brazil	41.62	Q
3	1	4	Arjola Trimi	Italy	42.88	Q
4	2	2	Nely Miranda	Mexico	43.02	Q
5	2	4	Rachael Watson	Australia	43.32	Q
6	1	2	Zhou Yanfei	China	43.75	Q
7	1	5	Nataliia Butkova	RPC	43.95	Q
8	1	6	Zulfiya Gabidullina	Kazakhstan	44.57	Q
9	2	6	Gina Böttcher	Germany	46.33	
10	1	3	Alexandra Stamatopoulou	Greece	46.61	
11	2	7	Olga Sviderska	Ukraine	48.03	
12	1	7	Susana Schnarndorf	Brazil	48.78	
13	2	1	Ellie Challis	Great Britain	54.94	
14	1	1	Yuliia Safonova	Ukraine	1:01.46	

== Final ==
50m freestyle final
Rank	Lane	Name	Nationality	Time	Notes
1st place, gold medalist(s)	2	Rachael Watson	Australia	39.36	PR
2nd place, silver medalist(s)	3	Arjola Trimi	Italy	40.32	WR
3rd place, bronze medalist(s)	4	Marta Fernández Infante	Spain	40.85	
4	5	Patrícia Pereira	Brazil	41.56	
5	6	Nely Miranda	Mexico	42.31	
6	7	Zhou Yanfei	China	43.16	
7	1	Nataliia Butkova	RPC	43.75	
8	8	Zulfiya Gabidullina	Kazakhstan	48.12	
