= Kazakhstan at the 2012 Summer Paralympics =

- IPC code: KAZ
- NPC: National Paralympic Committee of Kazakhstan

in London
- Competitors: 7 in 3 sports
- Medals: Gold 0 Silver 0 Bronze 0 Total 0

Summer Paralympics appearances (overview)
- 1996; 2000; 2004; 2008; 2012; 2016; 2020; 2024

Other related appearances
- Soviet Union (1988); Unified Team (1992)

Kazakhstan competed at the 2012 Summer Paralympics in London, United Kingdom, from August 29 to September 9, 2012.

== Athletics ==
Men's Track and Road Events

Athlete	Event	Heat		Final	
Athlete	Event	Result	Rank	Result	Rank
Sergey Kharlamov	100m T36	13.92	6	did not advance	
Islam Salimov	400m T13	54.14	6	did not advance	

Men's Field Events

Athlete	Event	Distance	Rank
Sergey Kharlamov	Long Jump F36	4.68	8
Islam Salimov	Long Jump F13	5.64	12

Women's Track and Road Events

Athlete	Event	Heat		Final	
Athlete	Event	Result	Rank	Result	Rank
Ainur Baiduldayeva	100m T36	16.70	6	did not advance	
Ainur Baiduldayeva	200m T36	35.95	5	did not advance	

== Powerlifting ==
Men

Athlete	Event	Result	Rank
Aibek Abzhan	-60kg	120	9

Women

Athlete	Event	Result	Rank
Kabira Askarova	-44kg	65	7

== Swimming ==
Men

Athletes	Event	Heat		Final	
Athletes	Event	Time	Rank	Time	Rank
Anuar Akhmetov	50m freestyle S12	26.90	12	did not advance	
Anuar Akhmetov	100m backstroke S12	1:13.43	11	did not advance	
Anuar Akhmetov	100m breaststroke SB12	1:15.09	12	did not advance	
Anuar Akhmetov	100m butterfly S12	1:15.89	16	did not advance	

Women

Athletes	Event	Heat		Final	
Athletes	Event	Time	Rank	Time	Rank
Zulfiya Gabidullina	50m backstroke S4	1:10.12	12	did not advance	

== See also ==
- Kazakhstan at the 2012 Summer Olympics
- Kazakhstan at the Paralympics
