= Swimming at the 2020 Summer Paralympics – Women's 150 metre individual medley SM4 =

Women's 150 metre individual medley SM4 at the XVI Paralympic Games
- Venue: Tokyo Aquatics Centre
- Dates: 28 August 2021
- Competitors: 18 from 14 nations

Medalists
1st place, gold medalist(s)		Liu Yu	China
2nd place, silver medalist(s)		Zhou Yanfei	China
3rd place, bronze medalist(s)		Nataliia Butkova	RPC

The Women's 150 metre individual medley SM4 swimming events for the 2020 Summer Paralympics took place at the Tokyo Aquatics Centre on 28 August 2021.

== Medal summary ==
The following is a summary of the medals awarded across the 150 metre individual medley events.

Classification	Gold		Silver		Bronze	
SM4	Liu Yu; China	2:41.91	Zhou Yanfei; China	2:47.41	Nataliia Butkova; RPC	2:53.25

== SM4 ==
The SM4 category is for swimmers who have hemiplegia, paraplegia or short stature.

=== Heats ===
The swimmers with the top eight times, regardless of heat, advanced to the final.

Rank	Heat	Lane	Name	Nationality	Time	Notes
1	1	2	Liu Yu	China	2:39.39	Q, WR
2	3	2	Zhou Yanfei	China	2:50.11	Q
3	2	4	Nataliia Butkova	RPC	2:57.40	Q
4	3	3	Marta Fernández Infante	Spain	3:03.11	Q
5	2	5	Susana Schnarndorf	Brazil	3:06.54	Q
6	3	4	Leanne Smith	United States	3:08.12	Q
7	1	4	Arjola Trimi	Italy	3:10.09	Q
8	3	5	Maryna Verbova	Ukraine	3:11.88	Q
9	2	3	Nely Miranda	Mexico	3:11.92	
10	1	5	Gina Böttcher	Germany	3:13.51	
11	1	6	Kat Swanepoel	South Africa	3:21.19	
12	1	3	Zoya Shuchurova	RPC	3:28.29	
13	3	6	Tammy Cunnington	Canada	3:41.06	
14	2	6	Yuliia Safonova	Ukraine	3:46.21	
15	2	2	Zulfiya Gabidullina	Kazakhstan	3:55.74	
16	2	7	Veronika Guirenko	Israel	4:32.00	
17	1	7	Nikita Ens	Canada	4:34.01	
18	3	7	Dominika Mičková	Czech Republic	4:45.08	

=== Final ===
Rank	Lane	Name	Nationality	Time	Notes
1st place, gold medalist(s)	4	Liu Yu	China	2:41.91	
2nd place, silver medalist(s)	5	Zhou Yanfei	China	2:47.41	
3rd place, bronze medalist(s)	3	Nataliia Butkova	RPC	2:53.25	
4	6	Marta Fernández Infante	Spain	2:59.13	
5	1	Leanne Smith	United States	3:07.07	
6	2	Nely Miranda	Mexico	3:08.71	
7	7	Maryna Verbova	Ukraine	3:09.17	
8	8	Susana Schnarndorf	Brazil	3:11.54	
