= Kazakhstan at the 2022 Winter Paralympics =

- Flag of Kazakhstan
- IPC code: KAZ
- NPC: National Paralympic Committee of Kazakhstan
- Website: paralympic.kz

in Beijing, China 4 March 2022 – 13 March 2022
- Competitors: 5 (5 men) in 2 sports
- Flag bearer: Yerbol Khamitov
- Medals Ranked 17th: Gold 0 Silver 0 Bronze 1 Total 1

Winter Paralympics appearances (overview)
- 1994; 1998; 2002; 2006; 2010; 2014; 2018; 2022; 2026

Other related appearances
- Soviet Union (1988); Unified Team (1992)

Kazakhstan competed at the 2022 Winter Paralympics in Beijing, China which took place between 4–13 March 2022. In total, five athletes competed in two sports.

== Medalists ==
The following Kazakh competitors won medals at the games. In the discipline sections below, the medalists' names are bolded.

Medal	Name	Sport	Event	Date
Bronze	Alexandr Gerlits	Biathlon	Men's 10 kilometres, standing	8 March

**Medals by sport**
**Sport**	1st place, gold medalist(s)	2nd place, silver medalist(s)	3rd place, bronze medalist(s)	**Total**
Biathlon	0	0	1	**1**
**Total**	**0**	**0**	**1**	**1**

**Medals by gender**
**Gender**	1st place, gold medalist(s)	2nd place, silver medalist(s)	3rd place, bronze medalist(s)	**Total**
Male	0	0	1	**1**
Female	0	0	0	**0**
Mixed	0	0	0	**0**
**Total**	**0**	**0**	**1**	**1**

== Competitors ==
The following is the list of number of competitors participating at the Games per sport/discipline.

Sport	Men	Women	Total
Biathlon	3	0	3*
Cross-country skiing	5	0	5*
Total	5	0	5

== Biathlon ==
Kazakhstan competed in biathlon.

Men

Athlete	Events	Final		
Athlete	Events	Missed Shots	Result	Rank
**Alexandr Gerlits**	6 km, standing	2	18:40.3	8
**Alexandr Gerlits**	10 km, standing	3	33:06.5	3rd place, bronze medalist(s)
**Alexandr Gerlits**	12.5 km, standing	2	43:17.6	5
Yerbol Khamitov	6 km, sitting	0	22:00.9	15
Yerbol Khamitov	10 km, sitting	4	37:49.8	16
Sergey Ussoltsev	6 km, sitting	2	21:15.6	14
Sergey Ussoltsev	10 km, sitting	3	35:53.1	14
Sergey Ussoltsev	12.5 km, sitting	1	47:51.2	15

== Cross-country skiing ==
Kazakhstan competed in cross-country skiing.

Men

Athlete	Event	Qualification		Semifinal		Final	
Athlete	Event	Result	Rank	Result	Rank	Result	Rank
Alexandr Gerlits	1.5 km sprint, sitting	2:50.45	8	3:26.3	2	3:13.0	5
Alexandr Gerlits	12.5 km free, standing	—N/a				35:11.0	5
Yuriy Berezin	1.5 km sprint, sitting	2:48.56	30	Did not qualify			
Yuriy Berezin	10 km, sitting	—N/a				44:16.9	31
Yuriy Berezin	18 km, sitting	—N/a				58:27.0	24
Yerbol Khamitov	1.5 km sprint, sitting	2:28.67	15	Did not qualify			
Yerbol Khamitov	10 km, sitting	—N/a				34:45.5	9
Yerbol Khamitov	18 km, sitting	—N/a				49:23.1	7
Denis Petrenko	1.5 km sprint, sitting	2:53.97	32	Did not qualify			
Denis Petrenko	10 km, sitting	—N/a				40:57.6	26
Denis Petrenko	18 km, sitting	—N/a				59:19.2	25
Sergey Ussoltsev	1.5 km sprint, sitting	2:56.76	34	Did not qualify			
Sergey Ussoltsev	10 km, sitting	—N/a				38:52.2	22

Relay

Athletes	Event	Final	
Athletes	Event	Time	Rank
Alexandr Gerlits; Yerbol Khamitov	4 x 2.5 km open relay	30:00.4	5

== See also ==
- Kazakhstan at the Paralympics
- Kazakhstan at the 2022 Winter Olympics
