= Kazakhstan at the 2016 Summer Paralympics =

- IPC code: KAZ
- NPC: National Paralympic Committee of Kazakhstan

in Rio de Janeiro
- Competitors: 11 in 5 sports
- Medals Ranked 58th: Gold 1 Silver 1 Bronze 0 Total 2

Summer Paralympics appearances (overview)
- 1996; 2000; 2004; 2008; 2012; 2016; 2020; 2024

Other related appearances
- Soviet Union (1988); Unified Team (1992)

Kazakhstan competed at the 2016 Summer Paralympics in Rio de Janeiro, Brazil, from 7 September to 18 September 2016. 11 athletes in 5 sports won 2 medals. Zulfiya Gabidullina won gold with World Record in Swimming, Women's freestyle 100 m (S3). Raushan Koyshibayeva won silver in Powerlifting. Kazakhstan athletes finished 58th in medal count.

== Competitors ==
The following is the list of number of competitors participating in the Games:

Sport	Men	Women	Total
Archery	1	0	1
Athletics	1	1	2
Judo	2	0	2
Powerlifting	1	2	3
Swimming	2	1	3
Total	7	4	11

== Disability classifications ==
Every participant at the Paralympics has their disability grouped into one of five disability categories; amputation, the condition may be congenital or sustained through injury or illness; cerebral palsy; wheelchair athletes, there is often overlap between this and other categories; visual impairment, including blindness; Les autres, any physical disability that does not fall strictly under one of the other categories, for example dwarfism or multiple sclerosis. Each Paralympic sport then has its own classifications, dependent upon the specific physical demands of competition. Events are given a code, made of numbers and letters, describing the type of event and classification of the athletes competing. Some sports, such as athletics, divide athletes by both the category and severity of their disabilities, other sports, for example swimming, group competitors from different categories together, the only separation being based on the severity of the disability.

== Archery ==
Archery at the 2016 Summer Paralympics – Men's individual compound open

== Judo ==
Judo at the 2016 Summer Paralympics – Men's 60 kg

Judo at the 2016 Summer Paralympics – Men's 73 kg

== Powerlifting ==
Powerlifting at the 2016 Summer Paralympics – Women's 50 kg

Powerlifting at the 2016 Summer Paralympics – Women's 67 kg

Powerlifting at the 2016 Summer Paralympics – Men's 97 kg

== Swimming ==
Swimming at the 2016 Summer Paralympics – Women's 50 metre freestyle S4

Swimming at the 2016 Summer Paralympics – Women's 100 metre freestyle S3

== Medalists ==
Medal	Name	Sport	Event
Gold	Zulfiya Gabidullina	Swimming	Women's freestyle 100 m (S3)
Silver	Raushan Koishibayeva	Powerlifting	Women's 67 kg

== See also ==
- Kazakhstan at the 2016 Summer Olympics
- Kazakhstan at the Paralympics
