= Kazakhstan at the 2018 Winter Paralympics =

- IPC code: KAZ
- NPC: National Paralympic Committee of Kazakhstan

in Pyeongchang
- Competitors: 6 in 1 sport
- Medals Ranked 20th: Gold 1 Silver 0 Bronze 0 Total 1

Winter Paralympics appearances (overview)
- 1994; 1998; 2002; 2006; 2010; 2014; 2018; 2022; 2026

Other related appearances
- Soviet Union (1988); Unified Team (1992)

Kazakhstan sent competitors to the 2018 Winter Paralympics in Pyeongchang, South Korea. Six people and one guide skier from Kazakhstan will be going to Pyeongchang, South Korea for the 2018 Winter Paralympics. All are competing in para-Nordic skiing. There are six men and one woman. Three are going to their first Paralympic Games. They are coached by Vasily Kolomyjets (Kazakh: Василий Коломиец). The team spent two years preparing for the Winter Paralympics.

== Medalists ==
Medal	Name	Sport	Event	Date
Gold	Alexandr Kolyadin	Cross-country skiing	Men's sprint classical, standing	14 March

== Team ==
Six people and one guide skier from Kazakhstan will be going to Pyeongchang, South Korea for the 2018 Winter Paralympics. All are competing in para-Nordic skiing. There are six men and one woman. Three are going to their first Paralympic Games. They are coached by Vasily Kolomyjets (Kazakh: Василий Коломиец).

The table below contains the list of members of people (called "Team Kazakhstan") that will be participating in the 2018 Games.

Team Kazakhstan
Name	Sport	Gender	Classification	Events	ref
Zhanyl Baltabayeva (Kazakh: Жаныл Балтабаева)	para-Nordic skiing	female	LW12		
Alexandr Gerlits (Kazakh: Александр Герлиц)	para-Nordic skiing	male	LW6		
Kairat Kanafin (Kazakh: Қайрат Канафин)	para-Nordic skiing	male	B2		
Alexandr Kolyadin (Kazakh: Александр Колядин)	para-Nordic skiing	male	LW4		
Denis Petrenko (Kazakh: Денис Петренко)	para-Nordic skiing	male	LW11		
Sergey Ussoltsev (Kazakh: Сергей Усольцев)	para-Nordic skiing	male	LW12		
Anton Zhdanovich (Kazakh: Антон Жданович)	para-Nordic skiing	male	sighted guide		

== Russian doping scandal ==
15 National Paralympic Committees and the International Wheelchair and Amputee Sports Federation signed a letter expressing support for the National Paralympic Committee of Russia in August 2017. The countries included Armenia, Belarus, Bulgaria, Vietnam, Kazakhstan, Kyrgyzstan, China, Laos, Moldova, Mongolia, Serbia, Tajikistan, Montenegro, and South Korea. They asked the IPC Governing Board to consider letting Russia compete at the 2018 Winter Paralympics. The letter was signed weeks before the IPC Governing Board met in Abu Dhabi. In September 2017, this decision was reviewed and upheld. The International Paralympic Committee (IPC) still had concerns about doping in Russian sport. All the conditions the IPC required of the Russians were not met.

== Preparation ==
Kazakhstan is not competing in sledge hockey in 2018. The country is preparing for the future. They want to compete in sledge hockey in the future. Kazakhstan created a program in early 2018. Toyota became a sponsor in October 2017.

== Para-Nordic skiing ==
Two years before the start of the Games, Kazakhstan decided they wanted to win medals in South Korea. They started on two years of planning and training to accomplish this. The team spent nearly a year training in Germany before the South Korean hosted Games. They used snow tunnels during the summer months. This allowed them to train in winter conditions all year. During the summer, they also trained using bicycles. Because of sponsorship, many team members got new prostheses while in Germany. Kolyadin said of his new prosthetic, "They created a new prosthesis. When I got it, I tried it. Now I am accustomed to using it. I think I will win by using it in the race. It takes time to learn new technology. But there is 100% control - I like it." The team went to Russia for World Cup events. They did more training in Russia. They also went to a competition in Finland. The team returned to Almaty three weeks before the Games started. This was so they could do additional training.

The national team had about fifteen people. Only seven are going to South Korea. Their average age is from about 27 years old to 40 years old.

== See also ==
- Cross-country skiing at the 2018 Winter Paralympics – Men's 1.5 km sprint classical
