= Swimming at the 2020 Summer Paralympics – Women's 50 metre backstroke S4 =

Women's 50 metre backstroke S4 at the XVI Paralympic Games
- Venue: Tokyo Aquatics Centre
- Dates: 3 September 2021
- Competitors: 15 from 12 nations
- Winning time: 44.68

Medalists
1st place, gold medalist(s)		Liu Yu	China
2nd place, silver medalist(s)		Zhou Yanfei	China
3rd place, bronze medalist(s)		Alexandra Stamatopoulou	Greece

The Women's 50 metre backstroke S4 event at the 2020 Paralympic Games took place on 3 September 2021, at the Tokyo Aquatics Centre.

== Heats ==
The swimmers with the top eight times, regardless of heat, advanced to the final.

Rank	Heat	Lane	Name	Nationality	Time	Notes
1	2	7	Liu Yu	China	45.81	Q, WR
2	1	4	Alexandra Stamatopoulou	Greece	48.36	Q
3	2	5	Zhou Yanfei	China	49.93	Q
4	1	7	Kat Swanepoel	South Africa	52.04	Q
5	2	4	Maryna Verbova	Ukraine	52.16	Q
6	1	3	Gina Böttcher	Germany	54.40	Q
7	2	3	Nataliia Butkova	RPC	54.79	Q
8	1	5	Olga Sviderska	Ukraine	57.27	Q
9	2	2	Nely Miranda	Mexico	58.56	
10	2	6	Yuliia Safonova	Ukraine	58.98	
11	1	6	Brenda Anellia Larry	Malaysia	59.33	
12	1	2	Susana Schnarndorf	Brazil	1:00.50	
13	1	1	Tammy Cunnington	Canada	1:09.89	
14	2	1	Dominika Míčková	Czech Republic	1:11.84	
15	2	8	Zulfiya Gabidullina	Kazakhstan	1:21.90	

== Final ==
50m backstroke final
Rank	Lane	Name	Nationality	Time	Notes
1st place, gold medalist(s)	4	Liu Yu	China	44.68	WR
2nd place, silver medalist(s)	3	Zhou Yanfei	China	48.42	
3rd place, bronze medalist(s)	5	Alexandra Stamatopoulou	Greece	49.63	
4	6	Kat Swanepoel	South Africa	50.17	
5	2	Maryna Verbova	Ukraine	53.24	
6	7	Gina Böttcher	Germany	53.96	
7	8	Olga Sviderska	Ukraine	55.09	
8	1	Nataliia Butkova	RPC	55.18	
