= Swimming at the 2016 Summer Paralympics – Women's 50 metre backstroke S3 =

Women's 50 metre backstroke S3 at the XV Paralympic Games
- Venue: Olympic Aquatics Stadium
- Dates: 10 September 2016
- Competitors: 13 from 9 nations

Medalists
1st place, gold medalist(s)		Qiuping Peng	China
2nd place, silver medalist(s)		Guofen Meng	China
3rd place, bronze medalist(s)		Lisette Teunissen	Netherlands

The women's 50 metre backstroke S3 event at the 2016 Paralympic Games took place on 10 September 2016, at the Olympic Aquatics Stadium. Two heats were held. The swimmers with the eight fastest times advanced to the final.

== Heats ==
=== Heat 1 ===
10:28 10 September 2016:

Rank	Lane	Name	Nationality	Time	Notes
1	4	Guofen Meng	China	52.64	PR Q
2	5	Olga Sviderska	Ukraine	56.49	Q
3	3	Maiara Regina Perreira Barreto	Brazil	1:05.94	Q
4	6	Semicha Rizaoglou	Greece	1:06.18	Q
5	2	Zulfiya Gabidullina	Kazakhstan	1:06.46	Q
6	7	Fabiola Ramirez	Mexico	1:08.96	

=== Heat 2 ===
10:33 10 September 2016:

Rank	Lane	Name	Nationality	Time	Notes
1	5	Peng Qiuping	China	49.91	WR Q
2	4	Lisette Teunissen	Netherlands	54.34	Q
3	3	Alexandra Stamatopoulou	Greece	58.12	Q
4	2	Haidee Viviana Aceves Perez	Mexico	1:06.96	
5	6	Annke Conradi	Germany	1:12.28	
6	7	Maria de Jesus Delgadillo Monsivais	Mexico	1:12.69	
7	1	Veronika Guirenko	Israel	1:30.97	

== Final ==
18:32 10 September 2016:

Rank	Lane	Name	Nationality	Time	Notes
1st place, gold medalist(s)	4	Peng Qiuping	China	48.49	WR
2nd place, silver medalist(s)	5	Guofen Meng	China	51.42	
3rd place, bronze medalist(s)	3	Lisette Teunissen	Netherlands	53.44	
4	6	Olga Sviderska	Ukraine	54.01	
5	2	Alexandra Stamatopoulou	Greece	58.33	
6	8	Zulfiya Gabidullina	Kazakhstan	1:00.68	
7	7	Maiara Regina Perreira Barreto	Brazil	1:01.65	
8	1	Semicha Rizaoglou	Greece	1:12.05	
