= Powerlifting at the 2020 Summer Paralympics – Women's 67 kg =

Powerlifting – Women's 67 kg at the XVI Paralympic Games
- Venue: Tokyo International Forum
- Date: 28 August 2021
- Competitors: 8 from 8 nations

Medalists
1st place, gold medalist(s)		Tan Yujiao	China
2nd place, silver medalist(s)		Fatma Omar	Egypt
3rd place, bronze medalist(s)		Olaitan Ibrahim	Nigeria

The women's 67 kg powerlifting event at the 2020 Summer Paralympics was contested on 28 August at Tokyo International Forum.

== Records ==
There are twenty powerlifting events, corresponding to ten weight classes each for men and women. Prior to this competition, the existing world and Paralympic records were as follows.

World Record	Tan Yujiao (CHN)	140.5 kg	Jakarta, Indonesia	9 October 2018
Paralympic Record	Tan Yujiao (CHN)	138.5 kg	Rio de Janeiro, Brazil	11 September 2016

== Results ==
Rank	Name	Body weight (kg)	Attempts (kg)				Result (kg)
Rank	Name	Body weight (kg)	1	2	3	4	Result (kg)
1st place, gold medalist(s)	Tan Yujiao (CHN)	66.64	125	128	133	~~141~~	133
2nd place, silver medalist(s)	Fatma Omar (EGY)	65.51	116	120	~~128~~	–	120
3rd place, bronze medalist(s)	Olaitan Ibrahim (NGR)	64.57	115	119	~~127~~	–	119
4	Raushan Koishibayeva (KAZ)	65.81	106	~~112~~	112	–	112
5	Kim Hyeong-hui (KOR)	65.54	105	111	~~113~~	–	111
6	Tetyana Shyrokolava (UKR)	62.60	105	~~109~~	~~111~~	–	105
7	Maria Markou (CYP)	65.22	93	94	99	–	99
8	Paulina Przywecka-Puziak (POL)	65.37	92	94	98	–	98
