= Kazakhstan at the 2008 Summer Paralympics =

- IPC code: KAZ
- NPC: National Paralympic Committee of Kazakhstan

in Beijing
- Competitors: 3 in 3 sports
- Flag bearer: Lyazat Salimzhanova
- Medals: Gold 0 Silver 0 Bronze 0 Total 0

Summer Paralympics appearances (overview)
- 1996; 2000; 2004; 2008; 2012; 2016; 2020; 2024

Other related appearances
- Soviet Union (1988); Unified Team (1992)

Kazakhstan sent a delegation to compete at the 2008 Summer Paralympics in Beijing, People's Republic of China.

== Sports ==
=== Athletics ===
Athlete	Class	Event	Heats		Final	
Athlete	Class	Event	Result	Rank	Result	Rank
Svetlana Makeyeva	T12	Women's 100m	13.86	15	did not advance	
Svetlana Makeyeva	T12	Women's 200m	28.14	13	did not advance	
Svetlana Makeyeva	F12	Women's long jump	—		4.61	13

=== Powerlifting ===
==== Women ====
Athlete	Event	Result	Rank
Lyazat Sailmzhanova	75kg	80.0	7

=== Swimming ===
Athlete	Class	Event	Heats		Final	
Athlete	Class	Event	Result	Rank	Result	Rank
Pavel Muravyev	S11	100m butterfly	DSQ		did not advance	
Pavel Muravyev	S11	50m freestyle	31.59	17	did not advance	
Pavel Muravyev	S11	100m freestyle	1:12.40	16	did not advance	

== See also ==
- Kazakhstan at the Paralympics
- Kazakhstan at the 2008 Summer Olympics
