= Kazakhstan at the 1996 Summer Paralympics =

- IPC code: KAZ
- NPC: National Paralympic Committee of Kazakhstan

in Atlanta
- Competitors: 13
- Medals: Gold 0 Silver 0 Bronze 0 Total 0

Summer Paralympics appearances (overview)
- 1996; 2000; 2004; 2008; 2012; 2016; 2020; 2024

Other related appearances
- Soviet Union (1988); Unified Team (1992)

Thirteen male athletes from Kazakhstan competed at the 1996 Summer Paralympics in Atlanta, United States.

== See also ==
- Kazakhstan at the Paralympics
- Kazakhstan at the 1996 Summer Olympics
