= Kyrgyzstan at the 2008 Summer Paralympics =

- IPC code: KGZ
- NPC: National Paralympic Federation of the Kyrgyz Republic

in Beijing
- Competitors: 1 in 1 sport
- Flag bearers: Roman Omurbekov (opening & closing)
- Medals Ranked -th: Gold 0 Silver 0 Bronze 0 Total 0

Summer Paralympics appearances (overview)
- 1996; 2000; 2004; 2008; 2012; 2016; 2020; 2024

Other related appearances
- Soviet Union (1988); Unified Team (1992)

Kyrgyzstan sent a delegation to compete at the 2008 Summer Paralympics in Beijing, China. The only recorded athlete was powerlifter Roman Omurbekov.

== Powerlifting ==
Men

Athlete	Event	Result	Rank
Roman Omurbekov	-56 kg	135.0	13

== See also ==
- Kyrgyzstan at the Paralympics
- Kyrgyzstan at the 2008 Summer Olympics
