= Swimming at the 2016 Summer Paralympics – Women's 50 metre freestyle S4 =

Women's 50 metre freestyle S4 at the XV Paralympic Games
- Venue: Olympic Aquatics Stadium
- Dates: 17 September 2016
- Competitors: 16 from 13 nations

Medalists
1st place, gold medalist(s)		Rachael Watson	Australia
2nd place, silver medalist(s)		Arjola Trimi	Italy
3rd place, bronze medalist(s)		Nely Miranda Herrera	Mexico

The women's 50 metre freestyle S4 event at the 2016 Paralympic Games took place on 16 September 2016, at the Olympic Aquatics Stadium. Two heats were held, with seven and eight swimmers respectively. The swimmers with the eight fastest times advanced to the final, which was won by Australia's Rachael Watson.

== Records ==
Prior to the final, the World and Paralympic records were as follows:

=== S3 ===
World record	Zulfiya Gabidullina (KAZ)	42.21	Rio de Janeiro, Brazil	8 September 2016
Paralympic record	Zulfiya Gabidullina (KAZ)	42.21	Rio de Janeiro, Brazil	8 September 2016

=== S4 ===
World record	Nely Miranda Herrera (MEX)	39.52	Gatineau, Canada	16 July 2016
Paralympic record	Lisette Teunissen (NED)	44.82	London, Great Britain	30 August 2012

== Heats ==
=== Heat 1 ===
10:28 17 September 2016:

Rank	Lane	Name	Nationality	Time	Notes
1	4	Rachael Watson	Australia	40.69	Q PR
2	3	Patricia Pereira dos Santos	Brazil	44.10	Q
3	5	Jiao Cheng	China	44.62	Q
4	6	Marila Lafina	Ukraine	45.94	Q
5	2	Marina Verbova	Ukraine	50.56	
6	7	Patricia Valle	Mexico	55.04	
7	1	Sonja Sigurdardottir	Iceland	1:03.39	
8	8	Semicha Rizaoglou	Greece	1:11.60	

=== Heat 2 ===
10:32 17 September 2016:

Rank	Lane	Name	Nationality	Time	Notes
1	4	Nely Miranda Herrera	Mexico	40.23	Q PR
2	3	Zulfiya Gabidullina	Kazakhstan	42.38	Q
3	5	Arjola Trimi	Italy	42.60	Q
4	6	Lisette Teunissen	Netherlands	48.16	Q
5	2	Yue Deng	China	48.50	
6	7	Tammy Cunnington	Canada	51.97	
7	1	Karolina Hamer	Poland	57.11	
8	8	Haideé Aceves	Mexico	1:02.36	

== Final ==
18:33 17 September 2016:

Rank	Lane	Name	Nationality	Time	Notes
1st place, gold medalist(s)	5	Rachael Watson	Australia	40.13	PR
2nd place, silver medalist(s)	6	Arjola Trimi	Italy	40.51	
3rd place, bronze medalist(s)	4	Nely Miranda Herrera	Mexico	40.53	
4	3	Zulfiya Gabidullina	Kazakhstan	42.34	
5	7	Jiao Cheng	China	43.13	
6	2	Patricia Pereira dos Santos	Brazil	43.92	
7	8	Lisette Teunissen	Netherlands	45.56	
8	1	Marila Lafina	Ukraine	48.31	
