= Kazakhstan at the 2006 Winter Paralympics =

- IPC code: KAZ
- NPC: National Paralympic Committee of Kazakhstan

in Turin
- Competitors: 2 in 1 sport
- Medals Ranked 20th: Gold 0 Silver 0 Bronze 0 Total 0

Winter Paralympics appearances (overview)
- 1994; 1998; 2002; 2006; 2010; 2014; 2018; 2022; 2026

Other related appearances
- Soviet Union (1988); Unified Team (1992)

Kazakhstan participated in the ninth Winter Paralympics in Turin, Italy.

Kazakhstan entered two athletes in the following sports:

- Nordic skiing: 2 male

== Medalists ==
	(gold)	(silver)	(bronze)	Total
Kazakhstan	0	0	0	0

== See also ==
- 2006 Winter Paralympics
- Kazakhstan at the 2006 Winter Olympics
