= Kazakhstan at the 2004 Summer Paralympics =

- IPC code: KAZ
- NPC: National Paralympic Committee of Kazakhstan

in Athens
- Competitors: 8 in 3 sports
- Medals Ranked 76th: Gold 0 Silver 0 Bronze 0 Total 0

Summer Paralympics appearances (overview)
- 1996; 2000; 2004; 2008; 2012; 2016; 2020; 2024

Other related appearances
- Soviet Union (1988); Unified Team (1992)

Kazakhstan competed at the 2004 Summer Paralympics in Athens, Greece. The team included 8 athletes, 6 men and 2 women, but won no medals.

== Sports ==
=== Athletics ===
==== Men's track ====
Athlete	Class	Event	Heats		Semifinal		Final	
Athlete	Class	Event	Result	Rank	Result	Rank	Result	Rank
Mukhtar Kamysbayev	T54	100m	31.67	24	did not advance			
Mukhtar Kamysbayev	T54	800m	DNS		did not advance			
Zeinolla Seitov	T13	5000m	—				DNS	
Zeinolla Seitov	T13	10000m	—				37:29.15	16
Zeinolla Seitov	T13	Marathon	—				3:13:35	14
Yevgeniy Tetyukhin	T54	5000m	16:17.64	25	did not advance			
Yevgeniy Tetyukhin	T54	10000m	DNF		did not advance			
Yevgeniy Tetyukhin	T54	Marathon	—				2:35:45	31
Sergey Ussoltsev	T54	5000m	11:53.60	24	did not advance			
Sergey Ussoltsev	T54	10000m	24:38.80	24	did not advance			
Sergey Ussoltsev	T54	Marathon	—				2:39:54	32

==== Men's field ====
Athlete	Class	Event	Final		
Athlete	Class	Event	Result	Points	Rank
Yuriy Kvitkov	F13	Discus	27.58	-	7
Yuriy Kvitkov	F13	Javelin	41.22	-	5
Yuriy Kvitkov	P13	Pentathlon	2650		4

==== Women's track ====
Athlete	Class	Event	Heats		Semifinal		Final	
Athlete	Class	Event	Result	Rank	Result	Rank	Result	Rank
Saida Nurpeissova	T36	100m	—				17.84	7
Saida Nurpeissova	T36	200m	—				42.74	7

=== Powerlifting ===
Athlete	Event	Result	Rank
Ruslan Dolobayev	60kg	135.0	12

== See also ==
- Kazakhstan at the Paralympics
- Kazakhstan at the 2004 Summer Olympics
