= Kyrgyzstan at the 2020 Summer Paralympics =

- IPC code: KGZ
- NPC: National Paralympic Federation of the Kyrgyz Republic

in Tokyo
- Competitors: 2 in 2 sports
- Medals: Gold 0 Silver 0 Bronze 0 Total 0

Summer Paralympics appearances (overview)
- 1996; 2000; 2004; 2008; 2012; 2016; 2020; 2024

Other related appearances
- Soviet Union (1988); Unified Team (1992)

Kyrgyzstan competed at the 2020 Summer Paralympics in Tokyo, Japan, from 24 August to 5 September 2021.

== Competitors ==
The following is the list of number of competitors participating in the Games:

Sport	Men	Women	Total
Athletics	1	0	1
Judo	0	1	1
Total	1	1	2

== Athletics ==
Men's Field

Athlete	Events	Result	Rank
Arystanbek Bazarkulov	Shot Put F34	8.10	10

== Judo ==
Round of 16- L 00-11

== See also ==
- Kyrgyzstan at the 2020 Summer Olympics
