= Bourlon (surname) =

Bourlon is a surname. Notable people with the surname include:

- Albert Bourlon (1916–2013), French road cyclist
- Axel Bourlon (born 1991), French Paralympic powerlifter
- Cyril Bourlon de Rouvre (born 1945), French businessman and politician
