= Kazakhstan at the 1998 Winter Paralympics =

- IPC code: KAZ
- NPC: National Paralympic Committee of Kazakhstan

in Nagano
- Competitors: 1 (1 man and 0 women) in 2 sports and 4 events
- Medals: Gold 0 Silver 0 Bronze 0 Total 0

Winter Paralympics appearances (overview)
- 1994; 1998; 2002; 2006; 2010; 2014; 2018; 2022; 2026

Other related appearances
- Soviet Union (1988); Unified Team (1992)

Kazakhstan competed at the 1998 Winter Paralympics in Nagano, Japan. One competitor, Sergey Lozhkin, from Kazakhstan won no medals and so did not place in the medal table. He competed in one event in biathlon and in three events in cross-country skiing.

== See also ==
- Kazakhstan at the Paralympics
- Kazakhstan at the 1998 Winter Olympics
