= Kazakhstan at the 2002 Winter Paralympics =

- IPC code: KAZ
- NPC: National Paralympic Committee of Kazakhstan

in Salt Lake City
- Competitors: 1 (1 man and 0 women) in 1 sport and 3 events
- Medals: Gold 0 Silver 0 Bronze 0 Total 0

Winter Paralympics appearances (overview)
- 1994; 1998; 2002; 2006; 2010; 2014; 2018; 2022; 2026

Other related appearances
- Soviet Union (1988); Unified Team (1992)

Kazakhstan competed at the 2002 Winter Paralympics in Salt Lake City, United States. One competitor, Zeinolla Seitov, from Kazakhstan competed in three events in cross-country skiing. He won no medals and so did not place in the medal table.

== See also ==
- Kazakhstan at the Paralympics
- Kazakhstan at the 2002 Winter Olympics
