= Kyrgyzstan at the 2004 Summer Paralympics =

- IPC code: KGZ
- NPC: National Paralympic Federation of the Kyrgyz Republic

in Athens
- Competitors: 3 in 1 sport
- Medals: Gold 0 Silver 0 Bronze 0 Total 0

Summer Paralympics appearances (overview)
- 1996; 2000; 2004; 2008; 2012; 2016; 2020; 2024

Other related appearances
- Soviet Union (1988); Unified Team (1992)

Kyrgyzstan competed at the 2004 Summer Paralympics in Athens, Greece. The team included three athletes, all of them men, and won no medals.

== Sports ==
=== Powerlifting ===
Athlete	Event	Result	Rank
Eduard Gisov	56kg	NMR	
Shawkat Mugalimov	82.5kg	155.0	13
Roman Omurbekov	52kg	135.0	6

== See also ==
- Kyrgyzstan at the Paralympics
- Kyrgyzstan at the 2004 Summer Olympics
