= Kyrgyzstan at the 2024 Summer Paralympics =

2024 sporting event delegation in Paris

- Flag of Kyrgyzstan
- IPC code: KGZ
- NPC: National Paralympic Federation of the Kyrgyz Republic

in Paris, France August 28, 2024 – September 8, 2024
- Competitors: 4 (1 man and 3 women) in 4 sports
- Flag bearer: Mamatibraim Suranov
- Medals: Gold 0 Silver 0 Bronze 0 Total 0

Summer Paralympics appearances (overview)
- 1996; 2000; 2004; 2008; 2012; 2016; 2020; 2024

Other related appearances
- Soviet Union (1988); Unified Team (1992)

Kyrgyzstan competed at the 2024 Summer Paralympics in Paris, France, from 28 August to 8 September 2024.

== Competitors ==
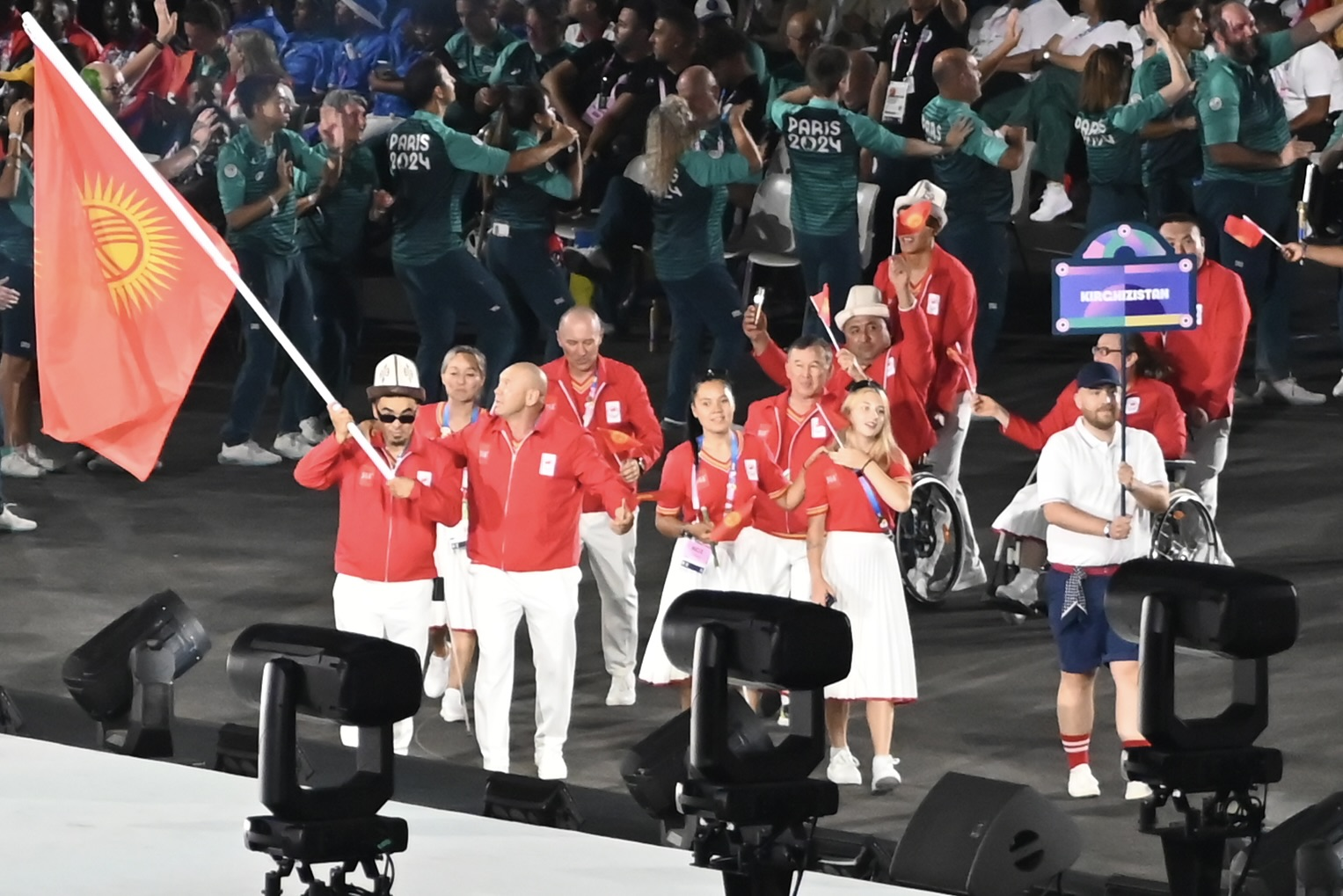
Kyrgyzstan at the 2024 Summer Paralympics.

The following is the list of number of competitors in the Games, including game-eligible alternates in team sports.

Sport	Men	Women	Total
Athletics	0	1	1
Judo	1	0	1
Paratriathlon	0	1	1
Powerlifting	0	1	1
Total	1	3	4

== Athletics ==
Key

- Note–Ranks given for track events are within the athlete's heat only
- Q = Qualified for the next round
- q = Qualified for the next round as a fastest loser or, in field events, by position without achieving the qualifying target
- DQ = Disqualified
- PR = Paralympic Record
- AR = Area (or continental) Record
- NR = National Record
- SB = Season's Best
- N/A = Round not applicable for the event
- Bye = Athlete not required to compete in round

Track & road events

Athlete	Event	Heat		Final	
Athlete	Event	Result	Rank	Result	Rank
Gulnaz Zhuzbaeva	Women's 1500 m T11	6:11:36	5th	DID NOT ADVANCE	DID NOT ADVANCE

DID NOT ADVANCE

== Judo ==
Athlete	Event	Round of 16	Quarterfinals	Semifinals	Repechage	Final / BM	
Athlete	Event	Opposition Result	Opposition Result	Opposition Result	Opposition Result	Opposition Result	Rank
Mamatibraim Suranov	Men's −73 kg J1	Mamedov Uzbekistan L 1-10	Did not advance				

== Paratriathlon ==
Athlete	Event	Swim	Trans 1	Bike	Trans 2	Run	Total time	Rank
Aitunuk Zhoomart Kyzy	Women's PTVI						1:25:36	11

== Powerlifting ==
Athlete	Event	Total lifted	Rank
Mirgul Bolotalieva	Women's –86 kg	96	8

== See also ==
- Kyrgyzstan at the 2024 Summer Olympics
- Kyrgyzstan at the Paralympics
