= Kazakhstan at the 2010 Winter Paralympics =

- IPC code: KAZ
- NPC: National Paralympic Committee of Kazakhstan

in Vancouver
- Competitors: 1 in 1 sport
- Flag bearer: Oleg Syssolyatin
- Medals: Gold 0 Silver 0 Bronze 0 Total 0

Winter Paralympics appearances (overview)
- 1994; 1998; 2002; 2006; 2010; 2014; 2018; 2022; 2026

Other related appearances
- Soviet Union (1988); Unified Team (1992)

Kazakhstan sent a delegation to compete at the 2010 Winter Paralympics, in Vancouver, British Columbia, Canada. It fielded a single athlete in cross-country skiing.

== Cross-country skiing ==
Oleg Syssolyatin was Kazakhstan's sole representative in cross-country skiing:

Athlete	Event	Final	
Athlete	Event	Time	Rank
Oleg Syssolyatin	Men's 1 km sprint, standing	5:27.14	31
Oleg Syssolyatin	Men's 10 km classic, standing	53:31.3	26

== See also ==
- Kazakhstan at the 2010 Winter Olympics
- Kazakhstan at the Paralympics
