= Kazakhstan at the 1994 Winter Paralympics =

- IPC code: KAZ
- NPC: National Paralympic Committee of Kazakhstan

in Lillehammer
- Competitors: 2 (1 man and 1 woman) in 2 sports and 8 events
- Medals Ranked 20th: Gold 0 Silver 1 Bronze 0 Total 1

Winter Paralympics appearances (overview)
- 1994; 1998; 2002; 2006; 2010; 2014; 2018; 2022; 2026

Other related appearances
- Soviet Union (1988); Unified Team (1992)

Kazakhstan competed at the 1994 Winter Paralympics in Lillehammer, Norway. Two competitors from Kazakhstan competed in two biathlon events and six cross-country skiing events. In total Kazakhstan won a single silver medal and finished 20th in the medal table.

== Medalists ==
Medal	Name	Sport	Event
Silver	Lubov Vorobieva	Cross-country skiing	Women's classical technique 10 km (B2)

== See also ==
- Kazakhstan at the Paralympics
- Kazakhstan at the 1994 Winter Olympics
