= Lennart Sass =

German Paralympic judoka (born 2000)

Personal information
- Born: 17 January 2000 (age 26) Kiel, Germany
- Occupation: Judoka

Sport
- Country: Germany
- Sport: Para judo
- Disability class: J1
- Weight class: −73 kg
Medal record
Men's para judo
Representing Germany
Paralympic Games
Bronze medal – third place	2024 Paris	−73 kg J1
European Para Championships
Silver medal – second place	2023 Rotterdam	−73 kg J1

Profile at external databases
- JudoInside.com: 154680

Lennart Sass (born 17 January 2000) is a German Paralympic judoka. He represented Germany at 2024 Summer Paralympics.

== Career ==
Sass represented Germany at the 2024 Summer Paralympics and won a bronze medal in the −73 kg J1 event.
