= Rufat Mahomedov =

Ukrainian Paralympic judoka

Personal information
- Born: 6 May 1992 (age 34)

Sport
- Country: Ukraine
- Sport: Paralympic judo
Medal record
Paralympic Games
Bronze medal – third place	2020 Tokyo	73 kg

Rufat Mahomedov (Ukrainian: Руфат Султанбекович Магомедов; born 6 May 1992) is a Ukrainian Paralympic judoka. He won one of the bronze medals in the men's 73 kg event at the 2020 Summer Paralympics held in Tokyo, Japan.

== Sports achievements ==
- World champion of 2019
- Bronze medalist of the European Championship 2019
- Silver medalist of the 2019 World Cup
