= Dimitrios Bakochristos =

Greek Paralympic powerlifter

Personal information
- Native name: Δημήτρης Μπακοχρήστος
- Born: 16 April 1983 (age 43)

Sport
- Country: Greece
- Sport: Paralympic powerlifting
- Disability: Short stature
- Weight class: 54 kg
Medal record
Paralympic Games
| Bronze medal – third place | 2016 Rio de Janeiro | 54 kg |
| Bronze medal – third place | 2020 Tokyo | 54 kg |
World Championships
| Bronze medal – third place | 2017 Mexico City | 54 kg |
| Bronze medal – third place | 2019 Nur-Sultan | 54 kg |

Dimitrios Bakochristos (Greek: Δημήτρης Μπακοχρήστος; born 16 April 1983) is a Greek Paralympic powerlifter of short stature. He is a two-time bronze medalist at the Summer Paralympics and a two-time bronze medalist at the World Para Powerlifting Championships.

== Career ==
Bakochristos represented Greece at the 2016 Summer Paralympics held in Rio de Janeiro, Brazil and he won the bronze medal in the men's 54 kg event. Bakochristos lifted 162 kg which was sufficient for the bronze medal; although Bruno Carra (representing Brazil) lifted the same amount as Bakochristos, he did not win the medal as his body weight was higher. He also won the bronze medal in the men's 54 kg event at the 2020 Summer Paralympics held in Tokyo, Japan.

At the 2019 World Para Powerlifting Championships held in Nur-Sultan, Kazakhstan, Bakochristos won the bronze medal in the men's 54 kg event. He also won the bronze medal in this event at the 2017 World Para Powerlifting Championships held in Mexico City, Mexico.

== Results ==
| Year | Venue | Weight | Attempts (kg) | | | Total | Rank |
| Year | Venue | Weight | 1 | 2 | 3 | Total | Rank |
Summer Paralympics
| 2016 | Rio de Janeiro, Brazil | 54 kg | 162 | ~~170~~ | ~~170~~ | 162 | 3rd place, bronze medalist(s) |
| 2021 | Tokyo, Japan | 54 kg | 157 | 163 | 165 | 165 | 3rd place, bronze medalist(s) |
World Championships
| 2017 | Mexico City, Mexico | 54 kg | 170 | ~~176~~ | ~~178~~ | 170 | 3rd place, bronze medalist(s) |
| 2019 | Nur-Sultan, Kazakhstan | 54 kg | 163 | 165 | ~~170~~ | 165 | 3rd place, bronze medalist(s) |
