= Tan Yujiao =

Chinese powerlifter (born 1990)

Personal information
- Nationality: Chinese
- Born: October 4, 1990 (age 35) Shaoshan, China

Sport
- Sport: powerlifting
Medal record
Powerlifting
Representing China
Summer Paralympics
Gold medal – first place	2016 Rio de Janeiro	67 kg
Gold medal – first place	2020 Tokyo	67 kg
Gold medal – first place	2024 Paris	67 kg
Silver medal – second place	2012 London	67.5 kg
World Championships
Gold medal – first place	2014 Dubai	67 kg
Gold medal – first place	2017 Mexico City	67 kg
Gold medal – first place	2019 Nur-Sultan	67 kg
Gold medal – first place	2023 Dubai	67 kg
Silver medal – second place	2021 Tbilisi	67 kg
Asian Para Games
Gold medal – first place	2014 Incheon	67 kg
Gold medal – first place	2018 Jakarta	67 kg
Gold medal – first place	2022 Hangzhou	67 kg

Tan Yujiao (谭玉娇; born October 4, 1990, in Shaoshan) is a Chinese powerlifter.

== Career ==
She won the gold medal at the Women's 67 kg event at the 2016 Summer Paralympics, with 135 kilograms.

She also won the gold medal in the women's 67 kg event at the 2020 Summer Paralympics held in Tokyo, Japan. A few months later, she won the silver medal in her event at the 2021 World Para Powerlifting Championships held in Tbilisi, Georgia.
