= Osvaldas Bareikis =

Lithuanian Paralympic judoka (born 1993)

Personal information
- Born: 19 December 1993 (age 32) Ukmergė, Lithuania
- Occupation: Judoka

Sport
- Country: Lithuania
- Sport: Para judo
Medal record
Paralympic Games
Bronze medal – third place	2020 Tokyo	73 kg
Bronze medal – third place	2024 Paris	73 kg

Profile at external databases
- IJF: 64931
- JudoInside.com: 99774

Osvaldas Bareikis (born 19 December 1993) is a Lithuanian Paralympic judoka. He won one of the bronze medals in the men's 73 kg event at the 2020 Summer Paralympics held in Tokyo, Japan.

In 2016, he lost his bronze medal match in the men's 66 kg event at the Summer Paralympics held in Rio de Janeiro, Brazil.
