= Meng Guofen =

Chinese Paralympic swimmer

Personal information
- Born: 28 November 1995 (age 30) Wenzhou, Zhejiang, China

Sport
- Country: China
- Sport: Paralympic swimming
- Disability: Cerebral palsy
- Disability class: S3
Medal record
Women's paralympic swimming
Representing China
Summer Paralympics
Silver medal – second place	2016 Rio de Janeiro	50 m backstroke S3

Meng Guofen is a Chinese Paralympic swimmer with cerebral palsy. She represented China at the 2016 Summer Paralympics held in Rio de Janeiro, Brazil and she won the silver medal in the women's 50 metre backstroke S3 event.
