= Powerlifting at the 2016 Summer Paralympics – Men's 54 kg =

Powerlifting – Men's 54 kg at the XV Paralympic Games
- Venue: Riocentro
- Date: 9 September 2016
- Competitors: 11 from 11 nations
- Winning lift: 200.0 kg WR

Medalists
1st place, gold medalist(s)		Roland Ezuruike	Nigeria
2nd place, silver medalist(s)		Wang Jian	China
3rd place, bronze medalist(s)		Dimitrios Bakochristos	Greece

The men's 54 kg powerlifting event at the 2016 Summer Paralympics was contested on 9 September at Riocentro.

== Records ==
There are twenty powerlifting events, corresponding to ten weight classes each for men and women. The weight categories were significantly adjusted after the 2012 Games so most of the weights are new for 2016. As a result, no Paralympic record was available for this weight class prior to the competition. The existing world records were as follows.

Record Type	Weight	Country	Venue	Date
World record	205 kg	Sherif Othman (EGY)	Dubai	6 April 2014
Paralympic record	–	–	–	–

== Results ==
Rank	Name	Body weight (kg)	Attempts (kg)				Result (kg)
Rank	Name	Body weight (kg)	1	2	3	4	Result (kg)
1st place, gold medalist(s)	Roland Ezuruike (NGR)	51.73	185.0	190.0	200.0 PR	~~205.5~~	200.0
2nd place, silver medalist(s)	Wang Jian (CHN)	53.62	170.0	~~175.0~~	~~179.0~~	–	170.0
3rd place, bronze medalist(s)	Dimitrios Bakochristos (GRE)	52.57	162.0	~~170.0~~	~~170.0~~		162.0
4	Bruno Carra (BRA)	53.79	~~162.0~~	162.0	~~163.0~~	–	162.0
5	Esen Kaliev (KGZ)	53.41	~~154.0~~	154.0	~~163.0~~	–	154.0
6	Jorge Carinao (CHI)	53.94	145.0	150.0	~~152.0~~	–	150.0
7	Sergii Khvalinskyi (UKR)	53.65	~~143.0~~	143.0	~~150.0~~	–	143.0
8	Gyorgy Sztano (HUN)	52.96	112.0	~~122.0~~	~~122.0~~	–	112.0
-	Tetsuo Nishizaki (JPN)	52.88	~~127.0~~	~~127.0~~	~~127.0~~	–	NMR
-	Alidou Diamoutene (CIV)	53.21	~~165.0~~	~~165.0~~	~~170.0~~	–	NMR
-	Binh An Nguyen (VIE)	53.11	~~178.0~~	~~178.0~~	~~178.0~~	–	NMR
