= Kyrgyzstan at the Paralympics =

- IPC code: KGZ
- NPC: National Paralympic Federation of the Kyrgyz Republic
- Medals: Gold 0 Silver 0 Bronze 0 Total 0

Summer appearances
- 1996; 2000; 2004; 2008; 2012; 2016; 2020; 2024

Winter appearances
- 2014; 2018; 2022

Other related appearances
- Soviet Union (1988); Unified Team (1992)

Kyrgyzstan made its Paralympic Games début at the 1996 Summer Paralympics in Atlanta and has competed in every edition of the Summer Paralympics since then - albeit with delegations consisting in no more than three athletes. Kyrgyzstan made its début at the Winter Paralympics in 2014 in Sochi.

Kyrgyz athletes have only ever competed in powerlifting. All have been men, and none has ever won a Paralympic medal. The closest any has come to doing so was Roman Omurbekov's sixth place in the Up To 52 kg event at the 2004 Games, with a lift of 135 kg.

== See also ==
- Kyrgyzstan at the Olympics
