= Liu Yu (para swimmer) =

Chinese Paralympic swimmer

Personal information
- Native name: 刘玉
- Nationality: Chinese
- Born: 1 June 1989 (age 37) China

Sport
- Sport: Swimming
Medal record
Representing China
Women's Paralympic swimming
Paralympic Games
Gold medal – first place	2020 Tokyo	50 m backstroke S4
Gold medal – first place	2020 Tokyo	150m ind. medley SM4
Bronze medal – third place	2024 Paris	50 m backstroke S5
Asian Para Games
Gold medal – first place	2022 Hangzhou	200 m freestyle S5

Liu Yu (born 1 June 1989) is a Chinese para swimmer.

== Career ==
Liu competed in her first Paralympic games at the 2020 Tokyo Paralympics, where she won two gold medals in the 50 metre backstroke (WR 44.68) and in the 150m Individual Medley SM4 (2:41.91).
