= Rachael Watson =

Australian Paralympic swimmer

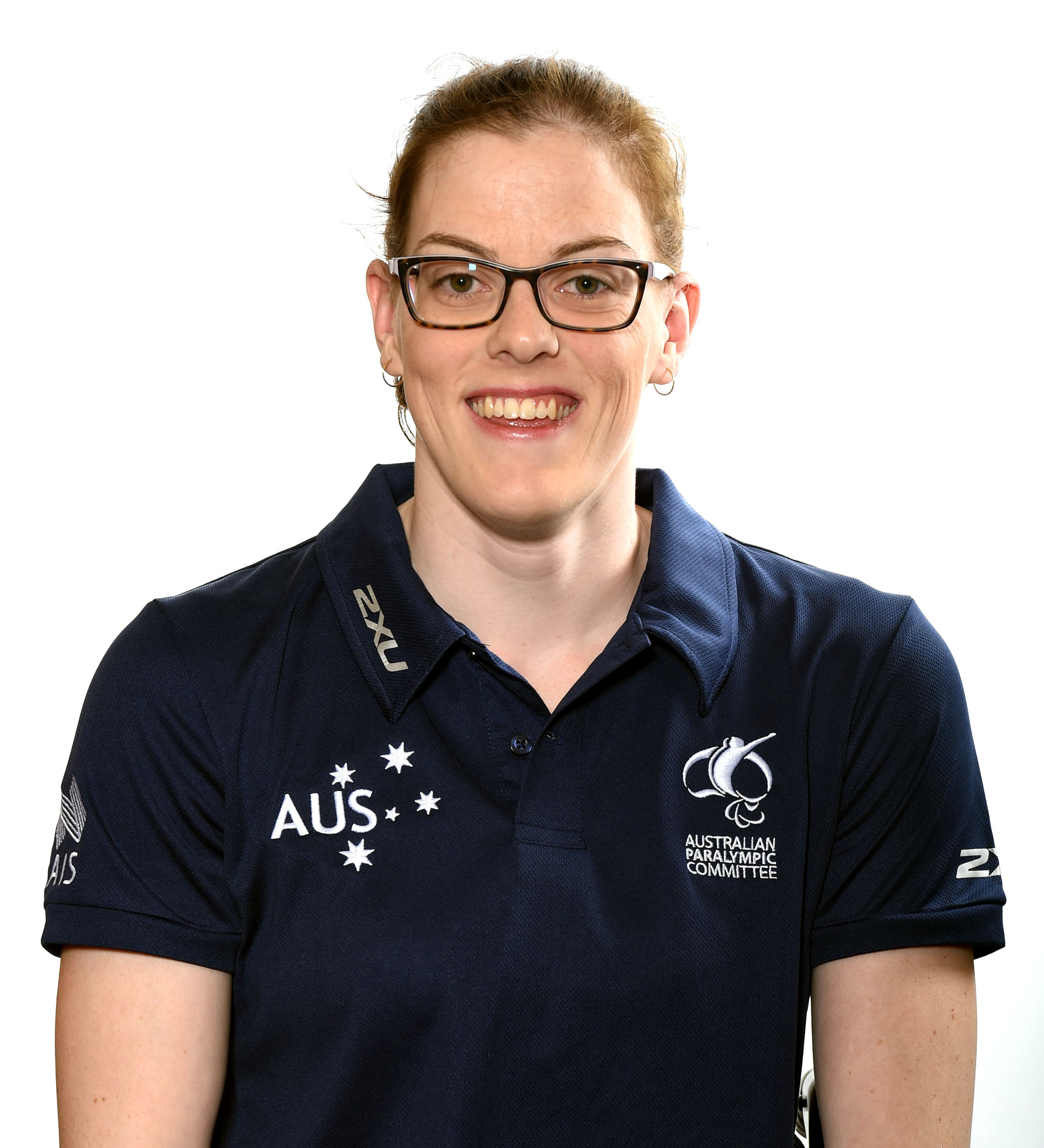
- 2016 Australian Paralympic team portrait of Rachael Watson

Personal information
- Full name: Rachael Watson
- Nationality: Australian
- Born: 30 January 1992 (age 34)

Sport
- Sport: Swimming
- Classifications: S3
- Club: Chandler Swimming Club
Medal record
Women's paralympic swimming
Representing Australia
Event	1st	2nd	3rd
Paralympic Games	2	0	2
World Championships	0	2	3
Pan Pacific Para Championships	1	0	0
Total	3	2	5
Paralympics
Gold medal – first place	2016 Rio de Janeiro	50 m freestyle S4
Gold medal – first place	2020 Tokyo	50 m freestyle S4
Bronze medal – third place	2024 Paris	50 m freestyle S4
Bronze medal – third place	2024 Paris	100 m freestyle S3
World Para Swimming Championships
Silver medal – second place	2019 London	50 m freestyle S4
Silver medal – second place	2022 Madeira	50 m freestyle S4
Bronze medal – third place	2019 London	100 m freestyle S4
Bronze medal – third place	2023 Manchester	50 m freestyle S4
Bronze medal – third place	2025 Singapore	100 m freestyle S3
Pan Pacific Para Swimming Championships
Gold medal – first place	2018 Cairns	50 m freestyle S4

Rachael Elizabeth Watson, OAM (born 30 January 1992) is an Australian Paralympic swimmer. Watson represented Australia at the 2016 Rio Paralympics winning gold in the 50m Freestyle S4, a feat she repeated at the 2020 Tokyo Paralympics. At the 2024 Paris Paralympics, she won two bronze medals.

== Personal ==
Watson was born on 30 January 1992. She is a triplet and has mild cerebral palsy however remained functionally independent and ambulant. In her early 20's she acquired Guillain Barre Syndrome that led to severe muscle weakness and peripheral nervous system damage resulting in quadriplegia requiring the use of a wheelchair. Watson has subsequently been diagnosed with chronic inflammatory demyelinating polyneuropathy.

In late 2025, Watson was awarded a Winston Churchill Fellowship to travel to Europe in 2026 to investigate "coaching methods and support requirements for swimmers with High Support Needs." This is a competitive overseas research grant funded by the Winston Churchill Memorial Trust which offers global learning experiences.

== Swimming ==
Watson took up swimming as part of her rehabilitation from Guillain Barre Syndrome. The majority of competitions are held in a multi class (MC) format where each athlete swims against the world record for their classification and the swimmer with the highest point score wins the race. Watson has myopia and is unable to see the results score board at the end of the pool so remains unaware of her placing until she is told. Watson has recently been reclassified to an S3 swimmer due to her degenerative neurological condition.

At the 2016 Rio Paralympics, Watson won the gold medal in the Women's 50m Freestyle S4 in a Paralympic record time of 40.13. Watson became the first swimmer classed S5 or below, to win gold for Australia this millennium.

Watson qualified for the 2017 World Championships but the competition was cancelled due to a major earthquake in Mexico occurring just a fortnight prior to the event.

In 2018, Watson was chosen to volunteer at the Gold Coast 2018 Commonwealth Games. She could not compete as her swimming classification was not included in this competition.

At the postponed 2020 Tokyo Paralympics, Watson won the gold medal in the Women's 50m freestyle S4 in a Paralympic record time of 39.36.

In 2022, Watson was chosen to volunteer at the Birmingham 2022 Commonwealth Games. She could not compete as her swimming classification was not included in this competition.

At the 2024 Paris Paralympics, Watson won the 500th medal in swimming for Australia and was the first Olympian or Paralympian to win a medal in the 50m Freestyle at three consecutive games. Watson also won Australia's first ever medal in the S3 100m Freestyle since the Paralympics begun in 1960.

At the 2025 World Para Swimming Championships in Singapore, she won the bronze medal in the Women’s 100m Freestyle S3.

== Recognition ==
- 2016 – Australian Institute of Sport Discovery of the Year
- 2016 – Sporting Wheelies and Disabled Association Most Improved Athlete
- 2017 – Medal of the Order of Australia
- 2021 - University of Queensland Blue (university sport) Award for Sporting Excellence
- 2022 - University of Queensland Sportswoman of the Year
- 2023 - Australian Sports Medal
- 2025 - Winston Churchill Memorial Trust Recipient of an overseas research travel grant
- 2025 - Swimming Brisbane Para Swimmer of the Year
