= Judo at the 2020 Summer Paralympics – Men's 73 kg =

Judo – Men's 73 kg at the XVI Paralympic Games
- Venue: Nippon Budokan
- Date: 28 August 2021
- Competitors: 11 from 11 nations

Medalists
1st place, gold medalist(s)		Feruz Sayidov	Uzbekistan
2nd place, silver medalist(s)		Temirzhan Daulet	Kazakhstan
3rd place, bronze medalist(s)		Rufat Mahomedov	Ukraine
3rd place, bronze medalist(s)		Osvaldas Bareikis	Lithuania

The men's 73 kg judo competition at the 2020 Summer Paralympics was held on 28 August 2021 at the Nippon Budokan.

== Results ==
=== Bracket ===
Round of 16
~~Ramil Gasimov (AZE)~~
Temirzhan Daulet (KAZ)	Bye
Djibrilo Iafa (POR)	00
Giorgi Kaldani (GEO)	11
Álvaro Gavilán (ESP)	00
Osvaldas Bareikis (LTU)	01
Takamasa Nagai (JPN)	10
Rodolfo Ramírez (ARG)	00

Quarterfinals
Nikolai Kornhass (GER)	01
Temirzhan Daulet (KAZ)	10
Rufat Mahomedov (UKR)	00
Giorgi Kaldani (GEO)	10
Feruz Sayidov (UZB)	10
Osvaldas Bareikis (LTU)	00
Vasilii Kutuev (RPC)	10
Takamasa Nagai (JPN)	00

Semifinals
Temirzhan Daulet (KAZ)	11
Giorgi Kaldani (GEO)	00
Feruz Sayidov (UZB)	10
Vasilii Kutuev (RPC)	00

Final
Temirzhan Daulet (KAZ)	00
Feruz Sayidov (UZB)	10

=== Repechage ===
Repechage 1
Djibrilo Iafa (POR)	00
Rufat Mahomedov (UKR)	10

Repechage 2
Nikolai Kornhass (GER)	00
Rufat Mahomedov (UKR)	01

Bronze medal
Rufat Mahomedov (UKR)	01
Vasilii Kutuev (RPC)	00

Repechage 2
Osvaldas Bareikis (LTU)	11
Takamasa Nagai (JPN)	01

Bronze medal
Osvaldas Bareikis (LTU)	01
Giorgi Kaldani (GEO)	00
