= Axel Bourlon =

French Paralympic powerlifter

Personal information
- Born: 14 March 1991 (age 35)

Sport
- Country: France
- Sport: Paralympic powerlifting
- Disability: Achondroplasia (short stature)
Medal record
Paralympic Games
Silver medal – second place	2020 Tokyo	54 kg

Axel Bourlon (born 14 March 1991) is a French Paralympic powerlifter. He won the silver medal in the men's 54 kg event at the 2020 Summer Paralympics held in Tokyo, Japan. He was born with achondroplasia, a form of dwarfism.

== Career ==
At the 2019 World Para Powerlifting Championships held in Nur-Sultan, Kazakhstan, he competed in the men's 54 kg event. He also competed in this event at the 2021 World Para Powerlifting Championships held in Tbilisi, Georgia.

In September 2021, Bourlon was awarded the Ordre national du Mérite.

== Results ==
Year	Venue	Weight	Attempts (kg)			Total	Rank
Year	Venue	Weight	1	2	3	Total	Rank
Summer Paralympics
2021	Tokyo, Japan	54 kg	162	~~163~~	165	165	2nd place, silver medalist(s)
World Championships
2019	Nur-Sultan, Kazakhstan	54 kg	150	~~156~~	~~156~~	150	6
2021	Tbilisi, Georgia	54 kg	~~153~~	157	~~162~~	157	5
