= Judo at the 2024 Summer Paralympics – Men's 73 kg J1 =

Paralympical event

Judo – Men's 73 kg J1 at the XVII Paralympic Games
- Venue: Champ-de-Mars
- Date: 6 September 2024
- Competitors: 13 from 13 nations

Medalists
1st place, gold medalist(s)		Alex Bologa	Romania
2nd place, silver medalist(s)		Yergali Shamey	Kazakhstan
3rd place, bronze medalist(s)		Lennart Sass	Germany
3rd place, bronze medalist(s)		Djibrilo Iafa	Portugal

The Men's 73 kg J1 judo competition at the 2024 Summer Paralympics was held in September 2024 at the Champ-de-Mars Arena, Paris.

== Classification ==
For the first time, Paralympic judo was divided into two classifications:

- J1 – An athlete's vision impairment must result in a visual acuity of less than or equal to LogMAR 2.6 in binocular vision.
- J2 – The athlete's visual acuity must be within a range between LogMAR 1.3 and 2.5 with binocular vision, or with a binocular visual field of 60 degrees or less in diameter.

This event was in the J1 classification.

== Results ==
=== Bracket ===
Round of 16
Mamatibraim Suranov (KGZ)	1
Shokhrukh Mamedov (UZB)	10
Dongdong Camanni (ITA)	1
HD Pereira Arruda (BRA)	10
Eduardo Gauto (ARG)	10
Ndyebo Lamani (RSA)	0
Gokce Yavuz (TUR)	0
Djibrilo Iafa (POR)	10
Yuji Kato (JPN)	0
Armindo Rodrigues (FRA)	10

Quarterfinals
Alex Bologa (ROU)	10
Shokhrukh Mamedov (UZB)	0
HD Pereira Arruda (BRA)	10
Eduardo Gauto (ARG)	0
Lennart Sass (GER)	10
Djibrilo Iafa (POR)	0
Armindo Rodrigues (FRA)	0
Yergali Shamey (KAZ)	10

Semifinals
Alex Bologa (ROU)	1
HD Pereira Arruda (BRA)	0
Lennart Sass (GER)	1
Yergali Shamey (KAZ)	10

Final
Alex Bologa (ROU)	10
Yergali Shamey (KAZ)	0

=== Repechage ===
Repechage 1
Dongdong Camanni (ITA)	10
Eduardo Gauto (ARG)	0

Repechage 2
Dongdong Camanni (ITA)	0
Shokhrukh Mamedov (UZB)	10

Bronze medal
Shokhrukh Mamedov (UZB)	0
Lennart Sass (GER)	10

Repechage 1
Djibrilo Iafa (POR)	10
Armindo Rodrigues (FRA)	0

Bronze medal
Djibrilo Iafa (POR)	1
HD Pereira Arruda (BRA)	0
