= Djibrilo Iafa =

Portuguese Paralympic judoka (born 1992)

Personal information
- Nationality: Portuguese
- Born: 12 June 1992 (age 34)
- Occupation: Judoka

Sport
- Country: Portugal
- Sport: Para judo
- Disability class: J1
- Weight class: −73 kg
Medal record
Men's para judo
Representing Portugal
Paralympic Games
Bronze medal – third place	2024 Paris	−73 kg J1
European Para Championships
Bronze medal – third place	2023 Rotterdam	−73 kg J1

Profile at external databases
- IJF: 64932
- JudoInside.com: 108394

Djibrilo Iafa (born 12 June 1992) is a Portuguese Paralympic judoka. He represented his country at the 2020 and 2024 Summer Paralympics.

== Career ==
Iafa represented Portugal at the 2024 Summer Paralympics and won a bronze medal in the −73 kg J1 event.
