= Boris Bogdanov =

Menshevik revolutionary (1884–1960)

Boris Osipovich Bogdanov
- Борис Осипович Богданов
- Born: Berel Bogdanov; 16 March [O.S. 4 March] 1884; Odessa
- Died: 15 June 1960 (aged 76); Moscow, RSFSR, USSR
- Political party: Russian Social Democratic Workers Party Mensheviks

Boris Osipovich Bogdanov (16 March 1884 – 15 June 1960) was a Russian revolutionary. As a Menshevik, he participated in the February Revolution in 1917.

Following the Bolshevik seizure of power in October 1917 he remained politically active against their regime. From the 1920s, he was repeatedly subject to repression by the USSR, being arrested and exiled multiple times and served 13 years in labour camps.

== Early life ==
Bogdanov was born into a merchant family of the first guild in Odessa to parents Osip Borisovich Bogdanov and Sofia Emmanuilovna Bogdanova. He graduated from the Odessa Commercial School of Nicholas I in 1902.

In 1907, he was elected as a member of the St. Petersburg faction of the RSDLP. Until 1913, he was repeatedly arrested and exiled for his revolutionary activity.

== Participation in February Revolution ==
Bogdanov was involved in the formation of the Petrograd Soviet.

In April 1917, he opposed the participation of socialists in the Provisional Government. In August 1917, at the socialist Conference of Democratic Organizations on Defence, he argued that military defeat in the war would put an end to the Revolution.

== Participation in the October Revolution ==
Bogdanov was an opponent of the October Revolution. In November and December 1917, he was a member of the Union for the Protection of the Constituent Assembly. In July 1918, he was arrested and imprisoned in the Peter and Paul Fortress.

In the September 1918 he was released at the request of Soviet leaders, as a he was needed as a specialist for the development of the economy. At this time, he left St. Petersburg for Odessa. There, he became a member of the local Soviet of Workers' Deputies.

== Life in prison and exile ==
In the post-revolutionary period, Bogdanov was repeatedly subjected to political repression by the Soviet authorities. He was repeatedly arrested by the organs of the Cheka, OGPU, NKVD and MGB of the USSR on charges of anti-Bolshevik activities and subjected to exile for his Menshevik past.

In December 1920, he was arrested along with the entire Menshevik faction of the Soviet of Workers' Deputies and was exiled to Vladimir. In fall 1921, he was released and went to Moscow, becoming a member of the Supreme Soviet of the National Economy. He arrested again on 27 December 1922 and was sentenced to two years in the Pertominsk. Here he became the representative of the Mensheviks in the camp and signed a telegram alongside Georgy Kachorovsky, representing the Socialist Revolutionaries and Ivan Charin representing the Anarchists complaining to the Soviet authorities that their human rights had been violated by the non delivery of letters and parcels sent to them.

In June 1923, he was transferred to the Solovki prison camp on Solovetsky Islands. At the end of his term of imprisonment in December 1924, he was exiled to Ust-Tsilma for three years. In April 1925 he was arrested again on suspicion of preparing an escape from exile. In July 1925 he was released. After being released from exile in January 1928, he moved to Baku. In July, he was arrested there and exiled to Simferopol for three years, where he worked in the State Planning Committee of the Crimean ASSR. In February 1931, he was arrested on charges of counter-revolutionary agitation and for participating in a counter-revolutionary organization. In 1932, the remaining term of his imprisonment was replaced by exile in Tomsk.

In 1937, he was arrested again. In April 1940, he was sentenced to eight years in a labour camp. He served his time in Kargopollag. He was released in January 1947 and exiled to Syktyvkar. In spring 1949 he was arrested again on charges of counter-revolutionary activity and sentenced to another ten years in a labour camp. In February 1955, he was released early for health reasons, and was sent to the Zubovo-Polyansk nursing home.

During his exile and imprisonment, he did some work as an economist. Despite suffering a stroke in 1952, he was only released after a second stroke in 1956. He was rehabilitated in 1956, but was still stigmatised as politically unreliable by the Soviet authorities and was unable to return to Moscow until 1959. He died in Moscow, on 15 June 1960 and was buried at the Donskoye Cemetery. He was fully rehabilitated by the Decree of August 13, 1990.
