= Swimming at the 2016 Summer Paralympics – Women's 100 metre freestyle S3 =

Women's 100 metre freestyle S3 at the XV Paralympic Games
- Venue: Olympic Aquatics Stadium
- Dates: 8 September 2016
- Competitors: 13 from 9 nations

Medalists
1st place, gold medalist(s)		Zulfiya Gabidullina	Kazakhstan
2nd place, silver medalist(s)		Qiuping Peng	China
3rd place, bronze medalist(s)		Olga Sviderska	Ukraine

The women's 100 metre freestyle S3 event at the 2016 Paralympic Games took place on 8 September 2016, at the Olympic Aquatics Stadium. Two heats were held. The swimmers with the eight fastest times advanced to the final.

== Heats ==
=== Heat 1 ===
10:42 8 September 2016:

Rank	Lane	Name	Nationality	Time	Notes
1	5	Olga Sviderska	Ukraine	1:39.07	PR Q
2	4	Qiuping Peng	China	1:39.16	Q
3	3	Alexandra Stamatopoulou	Greece	1:44.29	Q
4	6	Maiara Barreto	Brazil	2:16.80	Q
5	2	Semicha Rizaoglou	Greece	2:30.78	
6	7	Fabiola Ramirez	Mexico	2:34.10	

=== Heat 2 ===
10:48 8 September 2016:

Rank	Lane	Name	Nationality	Time	Notes
1	4	Zulfiya Gabidullina	Kazakhstan	1:39.17	Q
2	5	Lisette Teunissen	Netherlands	1:41.82	Q
3	3	Guofen Meng	China	1:45.11	Q
4	6	Patricia Valle	Mexico	2:09.03	Q
5	7	Haideé Aceves	Mexico	2:18.91	
6	2	Annke Conradi	Germany	2:28.57	
7	1	Veronika Guirenko	Israel	2:59.28	

== Final ==
18:41 8 September 2016:

Rank	Lane	Name	Nationality	Time	Notes
1st place, gold medalist(s)	3	Zulfiya Gabidullina	Kazakhstan	1:30.07	WR
2nd place, silver medalist(s)	5	Qiuping Peng	China	1:34.71	
3rd place, bronze medalist(s)	4	Olga Sviderska	Ukraine	1:34.86	
4	6	Lisette Teunissen	Netherlands	1:39.77	
5	7	Guofen Meng	China	1:42.64	
6	2	Alexandra Stamatopoulou	Greece	1:47.16	
7	1	Patricia Valle	Mexico	1:57.86	
8	8	Maiara Barreto	Brazil	2:11.54	
