= Powerlifting at the 2020 Summer Paralympics – Men's 54 kg =

Powerlifting – Men's 54 kg at the XVI Paralympic Games
- Venue: Tokyo International Forum
- Date: 26 August 2021
- Competitors: 8 from 8 nations

Medalists
1st place, gold medalist(s)		David Degtyarev	Kazakhstan
2nd place, silver medalist(s)		Axel Bourlon	France
3rd place, bronze medalist(s)		Dimitrios Bakochristos	Greece

The men's 54 kg powerlifting event at the 2020 Summer Paralympics was contested on 26 August at Tokyo International Forum.

== Records ==
There are twenty powerlifting events, corresponding to ten weight classes each for men and women. Prior to this competition, the existing world and Paralympic records were as follows.

World Record	Sherif Othman (EGY)	205.0 kg	Dubai, United Arab Emirates	6 April 2014
Paralympic Record	Rolland Ezuruike (NGR)	200.0 kg	Rio de Janeiro, Brazil	9 September 2016

== Results ==
Rank	Name	Body weight (kg)	Attempts (kg)				Result (kg)
Rank	Name	Body weight (kg)	1	2	3	4	Result (kg)
1st place, gold medalist(s)	David Degtyarev (KAZ)	52.64	170	172	174	–	174
2nd place, silver medalist(s)	Axel Bourlon (FRA)	52.95	162	~~163~~	165	–	165
3rd place, bronze medalist(s)	Dimitrios Bakochristos (GRE)	53.10	157	163	165	–	165
4	Taha Abdelmajid (EGY)	53.54	~~160~~	160	164	–	164
5	Choi Keun-jin (KOR)	53.53	150	158	~~164~~	–	158
6	Kostiantyn Panasiuk (UKR)	53.42	150	155	~~163~~	–	155
7	Ali Al-Darraji (IRQ)	52.41	130	135	137	–	137
	Bruno Carra (BRA)	53.47	~~157~~	~~157~~	~~157~~	–	–
