= 2018 Winter Paralympics medal table =

List of medals won by Paralympic delegations

2018 Winter Paralympics medals
- Location: PyeongChang, South Korea

Highlights
- Most gold medals: United States (13)
- Most total medals: United States (36)
- Medalling NPCs: 26

The 2018 Winter Paralympics medal table is a list of National Paralympic Committees ranked by the number of medals won during the 2018 Winter Paralympics, which were held in PyeongChang, South Korea, in March 2018.

In the standing men's 1.5 kilometre cross-country sprint, two bronze medals were awarded due to a tie.

Host nation South Korea, Croatia, and Kazakhstan and China also won their first gold medals at a Winter Paralympics history.

== Medal table ==
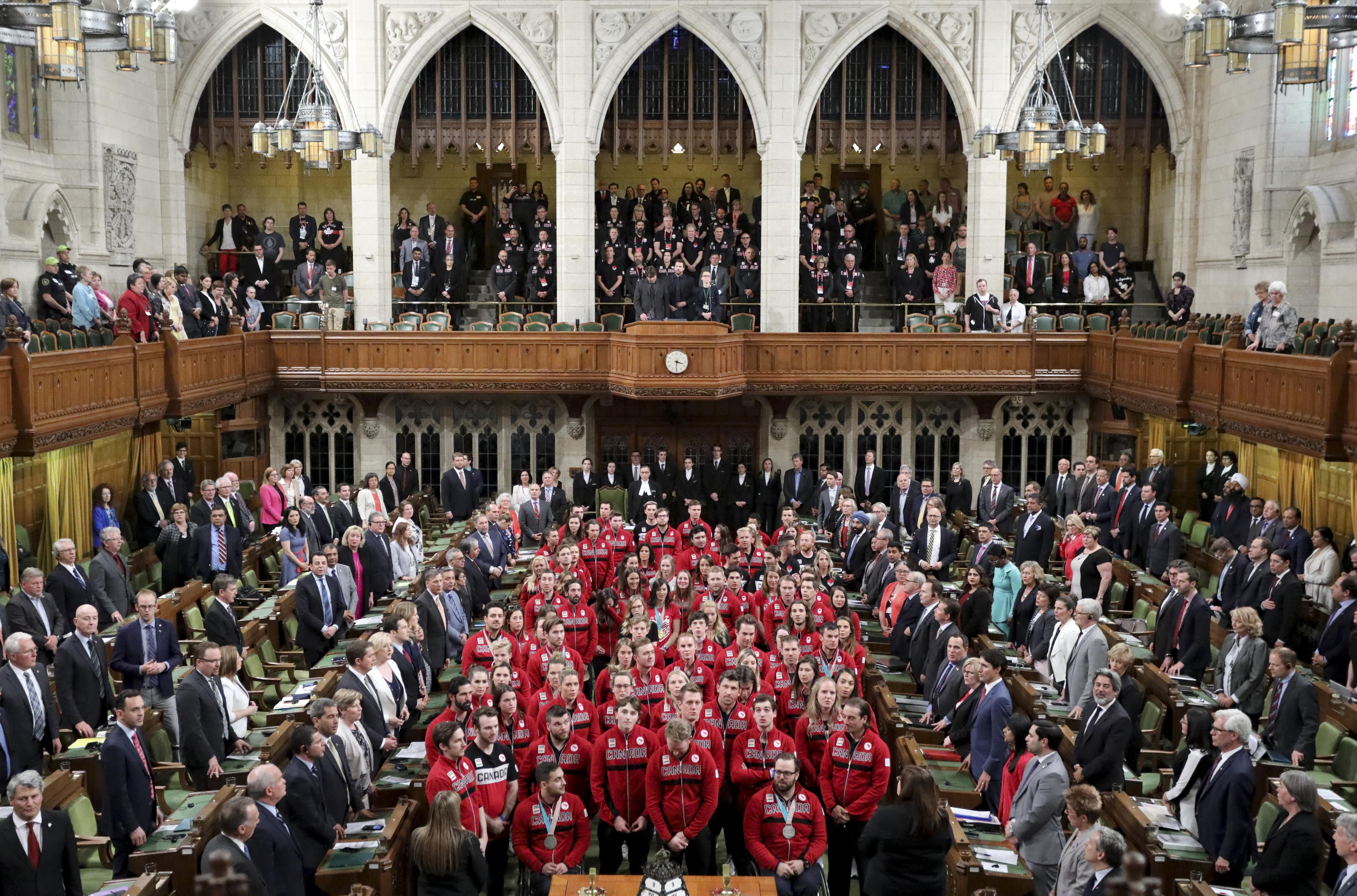
Canadian Paralympic and Olympic athletes in the House of Commons of Canada.

The ranking in the table is based on information provided by the International Paralympic Committee (IPC) and will be consistent with IPC convention in its published medal tables. By default, the table will be ordered by the number of gold medals the athletes from a nation have won (in this context, a "nation" is an entity represented by a National Paralympic Committee). The number of silver medals is taken into consideration next and then the number of bronze medals. If nations are still tied, equal ranking is given and they are listed alphabetically by IPC country code.

* Host nation (South Korea)

| Rank | Nation | Gold | Silver | Bronze | Total |
|---|---|---|---|---|---|
| 1 | United States | 13 | 15 | 8 | 36 |
| 2 | Neutral Paralympic Athletes | 8 | 10 | 6 | 24 |
| 3 | Canada | 8 | 4 | 16 | 28 |
| 4 | France | 7 | 8 | 5 | 20 |
| 5 | Germany | 7 | 8 | 4 | 19 |
| 6 | Ukraine | 7 | 7 | 8 | 22 |
| 7 | Slovakia | 6 | 4 | 1 | 11 |
| 8 | Belarus | 4 | 4 | 4 | 12 |
| 9 | Japan | 3 | 4 | 3 | 10 |
| 10 | Netherlands | 3 | 3 | 1 | 7 |
| 11 | Switzerland | 3 | 0 | 0 | 3 |
| 12 | Italy | 2 | 2 | 1 | 5 |
| 13 | Great Britain | 1 | 4 | 2 | 7 |
| 14 | Norway | 1 | 3 | 4 | 8 |
| 15 | Australia | 1 | 0 | 3 | 4 |
| 16 | Finland | 1 | 0 | 2 | 3 |
| 16 | New Zealand | 1 | 0 | 2 | 3 |
| 16 | South Korea* | 1 | 0 | 2 | 3 |
| 19 | Croatia | 1 | 0 | 1 | 2 |
| 20 | China | 1 | 0 | 0 | 1 |
| 20 | Kazakhstan | 1 | 0 | 0 | 1 |
| 22 | Austria | 0 | 2 | 5 | 7 |
| 23 | Spain | 0 | 1 | 1 | 2 |
| 24 | Sweden | 0 | 1 | 0 | 1 |
| 25 | Belgium | 0 | 0 | 1 | 1 |
| 25 | Poland | 0 | 0 | 1 | 1 |
| Totals (26 entries) | | 80 | 80 | 81 | 241 |
