= Yergali Shamey =

Kazakhstani Paralympic judoka (born 1985)

Personal information
- Nationality: Kazakhstani
- Born: 26 August 1985 (age 40)
- Home town: Astana, Kazakhstan
- Occupation: Judoka

Sport
- Country: Kazakhstan
- Sport: Para judo
- Disability class: J1
- Weight class: −73 kg
Medal record
Men's para judo
Representing Kazakhstan
Paralympic Games
Silver medal – second place	2024 Paris	−73 kg J1
Asian Para Games
Gold medal – first place	2022 Hangzhou	−73 kg J1
Bronze medal – third place	2018 Jakarta	Team

Profile at external databases
- JudoInside.com: 116978

Yergali Shamey (born 26 August 1985) is a Kazakhstani Paralympic judoka. He represented Kazakhstan at 2024 Summer Paralympics.

== Career ==
Shamey represented Kazakhstan at the 2024 Summer Paralympics and won a silver medal in the −73 kg J1 event.
