= Temirzhan Daulet =

Kazakh Paralympic judoka

Personal information
- Born: 20 February 1991 (age 35)

Sport
- Country: Kazakhstan
- Sport: Paralympic judo
Medal record
Paralympic Games
Silver medal – second place	2020 Tokyo	73 kg
Asian Para Games
Bronze medal – third place	2018 Jakarta	73 kg
Bronze medal – third place	2018 Jakarta	Team open

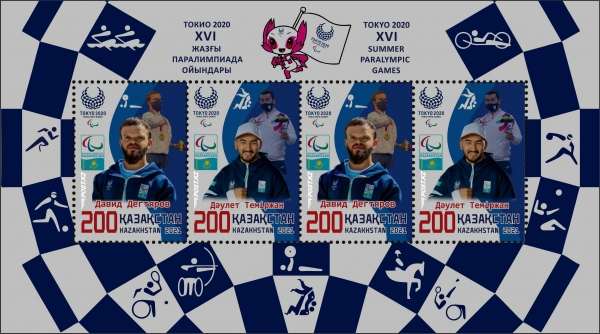
Paralympics 2020 Stamp of Kazakhstan

Temirzhan Daulet (born 20 February 1991) is a Kazakh Paralympic judoka. He won the silver medal in the men's 73 kg event at the 2020 Summer Paralympics held in Tokyo, Japan.
