= David Degtyarev =

Kazakh Paralympic powerlifter

Personal information
- Born: 12 June 1996 (age 30) Atbasar, Akmola Region, Kazakhstan

Sport
- Country: Kazakhstan
- Sport: Paralympic powerlifting
- Disability: Short stature
Medal record
Men's paralympic powerlifting
Representing Kazakhstan
Paralympic Games
Gold medal – first place	2020 Tokyo	54 kg
Gold medal – first place	2024 Paris	54 kg
World Championships
Gold medal – first place	2021 Tbilisi	54 kg
Asian Para Games
Gold medal – first place	2026 Aichi–Nagoya	54 kg
Gold medal – first place	2022 Hangzhou	54 kg
Silver medal – second place	2018 Jakarta	54 kg

David Mamievich Degtyarev (Russian: Давид Мамиевич Дегтярёв; born 12 June 1996) is a Kazakh Paralympic powerlifter. He is a two-time gold medalist in the men's 54 kg event at the Summer Paralympics (2021 and 2024). Degtyarev is also a gold medalist at the 2021 World Para Powerlifting Championships held in Tbilisi, Georgia.

== Career ==
In 2017, Degtyarev finished in 7th place in the men's 54 kg event at the World Para Powerlifting Championships held in Mexico City, Mexico. At the 2019 World Para Powerlifting Championships held in Nur-Sultan, Kazakhstan, he finished in 5th place in the men's 49 kg event.

Degtyarev won the gold medal in the men's 54 kg event at the 2020 Summer Paralympics held in Tokyo, Japan. It was the first gold medal won by a powerlifter representing Kazakhstan at the Paralympics. A few months later, he won the gold medal in his event at the 2021 World Para Powerlifting Championships held in Tbilisi, Georgia.

In December 2022, at the Para Powerlifting World Cup in the UAE, he won a gold medal, conquering the weight of 175 kg. In the sum of three approaches, gaining 510 kg, David won the second gold medal of the tournament.

Degtyarev won the gold medal in the men's 54 kg event at the 2024 Summer Paralympics held in Paris, France.

== Results ==
Year	Venue	Weight	Attempts (kg)			Total	Rank
Year	Venue	Weight	1	2	3	Total	Rank
Summer Paralympics
2021	Tokyo, Japan	54 kg	170	172	174	174	1st place, gold medalist(s)
World Championships
2017	Mexico City, Mexico	54 kg	145	~~153~~	~~154~~	145	7
2019	Nur-Sultan, Kazakhstan	49 kg	~~162~~	162	~~173~~	162	5
2021	Tbilisi, Georgia	54 kg	175	178	~~186~~	178	1st place, gold medalist(s)
