= Zhou Yanfei =

Chinese Paralympic swimmer

Personal information
- Nationality: Chinese
- Born: 16 October 1990 (age 35) China

Sport
- Sport: Swimming
Medal record
Representing China
Women's Paralympic swimming
Summer Paralympics
Silver medal – second place	2020 Tokyo	50 metre backstroke - S4
Silver medal – second place	2020 Tokyo	150m Individual Medley - SM4

Zhou Yanfei (born 16 October 1990) is a Chinese Paralympic swimmer from Kunming, China. At the 2020 Summer Paralympics, she won a silver medal in the 50 metre backstroke S4 and the 150 metre individual medley SM4. Her younger sister, Zhou Ying, is also a para swimmer; she won a bronze medal at the 2010 IPC Swimming World Championships in the 200m freestyle S5.
