= Alexandr Kolyadin =

Kazakhstani Paralympic cross-country skier (born 1973)

Personal information
- Nationality: Kazakh
- Born: 20 February 1973 (age 53)

Sport
- Country: Kazakhstan
- Sport: Paralympic cross-country skiing
- Disability class: LW4
Medal record
Men's para cross-country skiing
Representing Kazakhstan
Winter Paralympics
Gold medal – first place	2018 Pyeongchang	1.5km sprint classic standing

Alexandr Kolyadin (born 20 February 1973) is a Kazakhstani male cross-country skier. He has competed at the Winter Paralympics in 2014 and 2018. Alexandr Kolyadin claimed his first Paralympic medal at the age of 45 after winning the gold medal in the men's 1.5km sprint classic standing cross-country skiing event during the 2018 Winter Paralympics.
