= Dayana Fedossova =

Kazakhstani Paralympic judoka (born 2001)

Personal information
- Nationality: Kazakhstani
- Born: 13 July 2001 (age 24) Kyzylorda, Kazakhstan

Sport
- Country: Kazakhstan
- Sport: Para judo
- Disability class: J2
- Weight class: −57 kg
Medal record
Women's para judo
Representing Kazakhstan
Paralympic Games
Bronze medal – third place	2024 Paris	−57 kg J2
Asian Para Games
Bronze medal – third place	2022 Hangzhou	−57 kg J2

Dayana Fedossova (born 13 July 2001) is a Kazakhstani Paralympic judoka. She represented her country at the 2020 and 2024 Summer Paralympics.

== Career ==
Fedossova represented Kazakhstan at the 2024 Summer Paralympics and won a bronze medal in the −57 kg J2 event.
