= Alexandr Gerlits =

Kazakh Para biathlete and cross-country skier (born 1989)

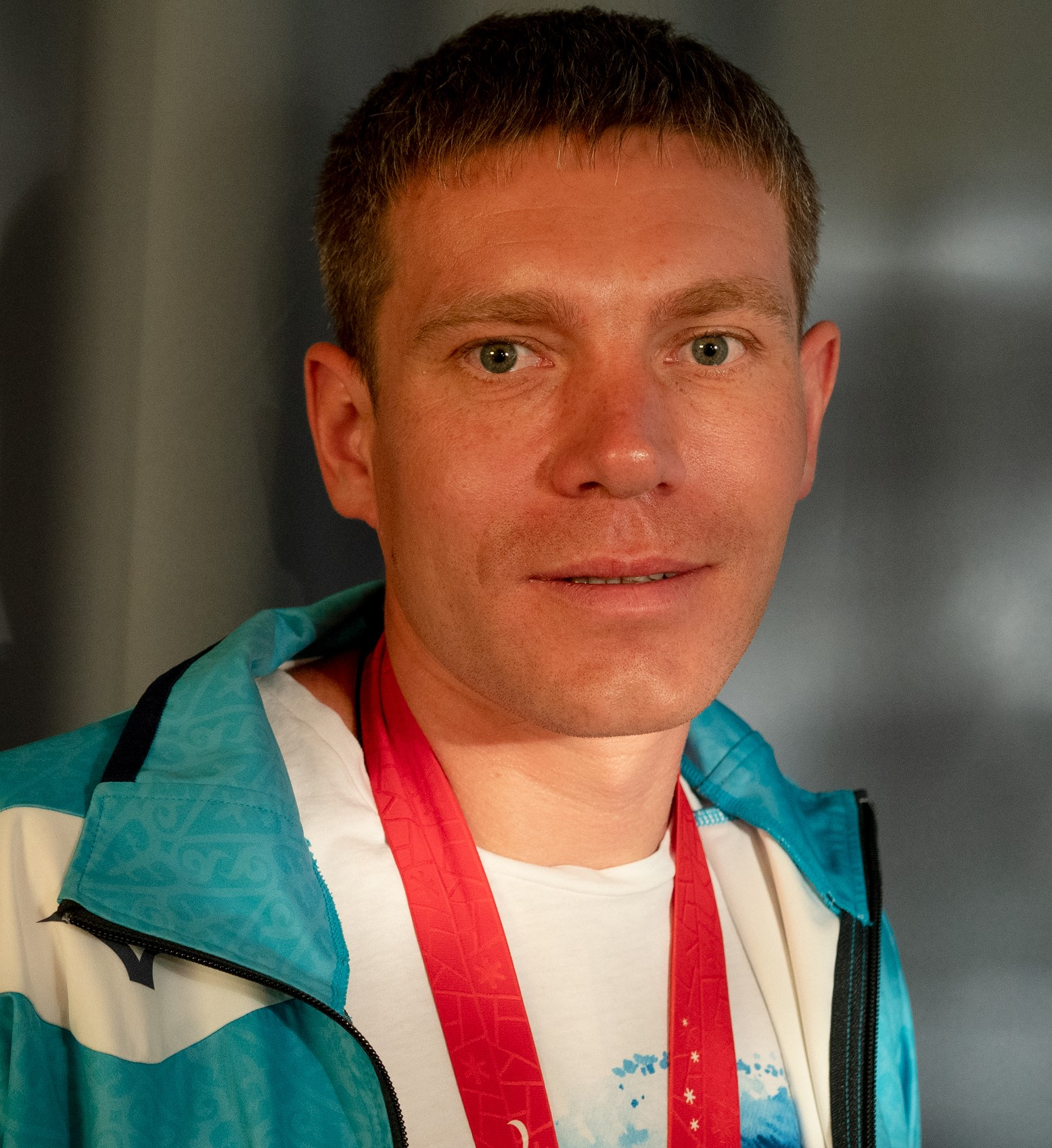
- Gerlits in 2022

Personal information
- Native name: Александр Александрович Герлиц
- Full name: Alexandr Alexandrovich Gerlits
- Born: 31 July 1989 (age 37) Petropavl, North Kazakhstan Oblast, Kazakh SSR, Soviet Union

Sport
- Country: Kazakhstan
- Sport: Para Nordic skiing (Para cross-country skiing and Para biathlon)
- Disability class: LW6
- Coached by: Vasily Kolomiyets
Medal record
Men's Para biathlon
Representing Kazakhstan
Paralympic Games
Bronze medal – third place	2022 Beijing	10km standing

Alexandr Alexandrovich Gerlits (Kazakh: Александр Александрович Герлиц; born 31 July 1989) is a Kazakhstani Para biathlete and cross-country skier who competed at the 2018, 2022 and 2026 Winter Paralympics.

== Career ==
Gerlits represented Kazakhstan at the 2018 Winter Paralympics where he finished in fourth place in the 20 kilometre free, sixth place in the 12.5 kilometres, and seventh place in the 7.5 kilometres event.

He again competed at the 2022 Winter Paralympics and won a bronze medal in the 10 kilometres standing event with a time of 33:06.5. This was Kazakhstan's first medal of the 2022 Winter Games.

In February 2026, he was selected to represent Kazakhstan at the 2026 Winter Paralympics.
