= Raushan Koishibayeva =

Kazakhstani Paralympic powerlifter

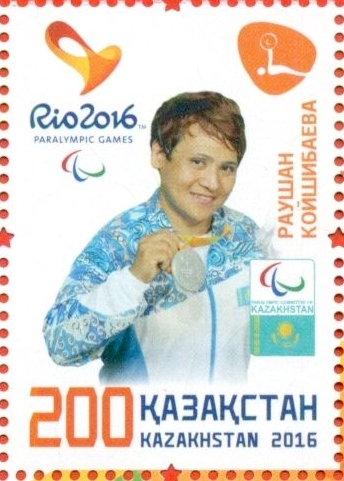
- Gabidullina on a 2016 stamp of Kazakhstan

Personal information
- Born: 7 March 1966 (age 60)

Sport
- Sport: Paralympic powerlifting
Medal record
Representing Kazakhstan
Paralympic Games
Silver medal – second place	2016 Rio de Janeiro	-67 kg
Asian Para Games
Silver medal – second place	2018 Jakarta	67kg
Silver medal – second place	2022 Hangzhou	73 kg

Raushan Koishibayeva (Russian: Раушан Койшыбаева, born 7 March 1966) is a Kazakhstani Paralympic powerlifter. She won a silver medal in the 67 kg category at the 2016 Summer Paralympics, aged 50.

== Personal life ==
Koishibayeva is married and has three children. Both of her legs were amputated in 1990 due to an injury. She took up powerlifting in 2010.
