= Zulfiya Gabidullina =

Kazakhstani Paralympic swimmer

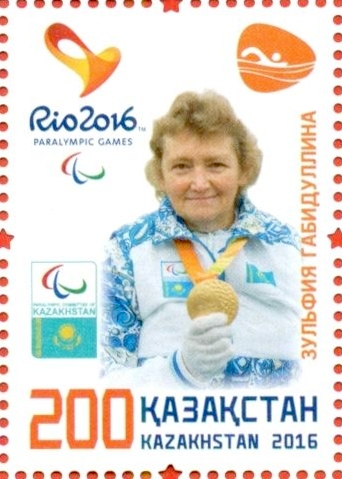
- Gabidullina on a 2016 stamp of Kazakhstan

Personal information
- Born: 22 November 1965 (age 60) Taraz, Kazakhstan

Sport
- Sport: Paralympic swimming
- Disability class: S4
- Event(s): Freestyle, backstroke, medley
Medal record
Representing Kazakhstan
Paralympic Games
Gold medal – first place	2016 Rio de Janeiro	100 m freestyle S3
IPC Swimming World Championships
Silver medal – second place	2013 Montreal	50 m freestyle S3
Bronze medal – third place	2013 Montreal	100 m freestyle S3
Silver medal – second place	2013 Montreal	50 m backstroke S3
Bronze medal – third place	2015 Glasgow	50 m freestyle S3
Bronze medal – third place	2015 Glasgow	100 m freestyle S3
Asian Para Games
Gold medal – first place	2018 Jakarta	Women's 100m Freestyle - S4 (1–4)
Silver medal – second place	2018 Jakarta	Women's 50m Freestyle - S4 (1–4)
Silver medal – second place	2018 Jakarta	Women's 50m Backstroke - SB4 (1–4)
Bronze medal – third place	2018 Jakarta	Women's 200m Freestyle - S5 (1–5)

Zulfiya Gabidullina (Russian: Зульфия Габидуллина, born 22 November 1965) is a Kazakhstani Paralympic swimmer who competes in the S4 category. She previously competed in the S3 class but was reclassified into S4, a class for athletes with more physical ability compared to S3. At the 2016 Summer Paralympics, aged 50, she won a gold medal in the 100 m freestyle, improving her own world record, and bringing Kazakhstan its only gold medal at the Paralympics. Gabidullina became disabled at the age of five. She is a businesswoman. She took up competitive swimming in 2007 and qualified for the 2012 Paralympics and 2013 and 2015 world championships.

== Results ==
=== Paralympic Games ===
1 100m Freestyle - S3 2016 Rio de Janeiro, BRA 1:30.07

4 50m Freestyle - S4 2016 Rio de Janeiro, BRA 42.24

6 50m Backstroke - S3 2016 Rio de Janeiro, BRA 1:00.68

7 150m Individual Medley - SM4 2016 Rio de Janeiro, BRA 3:25.30

12 50m Breaststroke - SB3 2016 Rio de Janeiro, BRA 1:19.01

12 50m Backstroke - S4 2012 London, GBR 1:10.12

=== World Championships ===
1 50m Freestyle - S3 2017 Mexico City, MEX 42.87

2 100m Freestyle - S3 2017 Mexico City, MEX 1:40.21

2 50m Freestyle - S3 2013 Montreal, QC, CAN 47.79

3 50m Freestyle - S4 2015 Glasgow, GBR 48.18

3 100m Freestyle - S3 2015 Glasgow, GBR 1:46.11

3 100m Freestyle - S3 2013 Montreal, QC, CAN 1:45.41

3 50m Backstroke - S3 2013 Montreal, QC, CAN 1:11.53

4 150m Individual Medley - SM3 2013 Montreal, QC, CAN 3:47.45

5 50m Backstroke - S3 2017 Mexico City, MEX 1:13.96

6 100m Freestyle - S4 2019 London, GBR 1:39.81

7 50m Freestyle - S4 2019 London, GBR 44.92

7 Mixed 4 x 50m Medley Relay 20 Points 2019 London, GBR 3:01.53

10 200m Freestyle - S5 2015 Glasgow, GBR 3:43.43

10 50m Backstroke - S3 2015 Glasgow, GBR 1:16.30

10 50m Breaststroke - SB3 2015 Glasgow, GBR 1:25.85

10 150m Individual Medley - SM4 2015 Glasgow, GBR 3:41.50

11 200m Freestyle - S5 2019 London, GBR 3:46.78

11 150m Individual Medley - SM4 2019 London, GBR 4:00.39

13 50m Backstroke - S4 2019 London, GBR 1:11.93

13 100m Breaststroke - SB4 2019 London, GBR 3:38.76

=== Asian Para Games ===
1 100m Freestyle - S4 2018 Jakarta, INA 1:47.27

2 50m Freestyle - S4 2018 Jakarta, INA 45.51

2 50m Backstroke - S4 2018 Jakarta, INA 1:17.72

3 200m Freestyle - S5 2018 Jakarta, INA 3:29.37

=== European Championships ===
6 100m Freestyle - S4 2020 Funchal, POR 1:50.48

6 150m Individual Medley - SM4 2020 Funchal, POR 4:01.86

7 50m Freestyle - S4 2020 Funchal, POR 49.01

12 50m Breaststroke - SB3 2020 Funchal, POR 1:40.29

DSQ 50m Backstroke - S4 2020 Funchal, POR DSQ
