= Unified Team at the Paralympics =

- The Unified Team used the Paralympic symbol in place of a national flag
- IPC code: EUN
- Medals: Gold 29 Silver 23 Bronze 19 Total 71

Summer appearances
- 1992

Winter appearances
- 1992

Other related appearances
- Soviet Union (1988); Estonia (1992–pres.); Latvia (1992–pres.); Lithuania (1992–pres.); Belarus (1994–pres.); Kazakhstan (1994–pres.); Russia (1994–2014); Armenia (1996–pres.); Azerbaijan (1996–pres.); Kyrgyzstan (1996–pres.); Moldova (1996–pres.); Ukraine (1996–pres.); Turkmenistan (2000–pres.); Tajikistan (2004–pres.); Uzbekistan (2004–pres.); Georgia (2008–pres.); Neutral Paralympic Athletes (2018); RPC (2020)

The Unified Team was the name used for the sports team of eleven former constituent republics of the Soviet Union (excluding Estonia, Georgia, Latvia, and Lithuania) at the 1992 Winter Paralympics in Albertville and the 1992 Summer Paralympics in Barcelona. The IOC country code was EUN, after the French name, Équipe Unifiée.

The Paralympic Flag was used in place of a national flag at the Opening Ceremony and at medals ceremonies, and the Paralympic Hymn was played for gold medallists. Unlike the Unified Team at the Olympics, the Summer Paralympic team paraded in the opening ceremony with no special procedure (no placard displayed the names of the individual countries, the announcers did not announce the names of the individual countries, and the athletes did not carry flags of the individual countries).

== Details ==
For details of the Unified Team's participation, see:

- Unified Team at the 1992 Winter Paralympics
- Unified Team at the 1992 Summer Paralympics

== Participating countries ==
The Unified Team's participating countries in the Summer games and the IOC codes used by them in subsequent Paralympics
Country (former Soviet republic)	IOC code (1994–)
Armenia	ARM
Azerbaijan	AZE
Belarus	BLR
Kazakhstan	KAZ
Kyrgyzstan	KGZ
Moldova	MDA
Russia	RUS
Tajikistan	TJK
Turkmenistan	TKM
Ukraine	UKR
Uzbekistan	UZB

== Performance ==
- The Unified Team finished third to the United States and Germany in the overall medal tally at Albertville with 10 golds, 8 silvers, and 3 bronzes; 21 medals in total
- The team finished eighth at Barcelona with 16 golds, 14 silvers, and 15 bronzes; 45 medals in total

(Note, however, that the International Paralympic Committee (IPC) does not officially recognise national medal totals.)

== Athletes ==
Athletes competing for the Unified team at the 1992 Summer and 1992 Winter Paralympic Games.

=== Summer Games ===
Men

- Archery
  - Stepan Bugaychuk
  - Dmitri Nikolsky
  - Konstantine Shumkov
- Athletics
  - Oleg Chepel
  - Victor Khilmonchik
  - Sergei Khodakov
  - Aleksei Lashmanov
  - Andrei Makarov
  - Sergey Okulov
  - Vladimir Potapenko
  - Sergei Sevastianov
  - Sergey Shilov
  - Sergey Silchenco
  - Yurij Zubrilov
- Cycling
  - Alexandre Pytko
  - Nikolai Timofeev
- Goalball
  - Vladimir Berejetski
  - Nikolai Lednev
  - Alexandre Litvinov
  - Alexei Pavlyguine
  - Nikolai Perejoguine
  - Alexandre Toupiline
- Judo
  - Akhmed Gazimagomedov
  - Vladimir Kazakov
  - Veniamin Mitchourine
  - Mikhail Yakovlev
- Powerlifting
  - Vladimir Larionov
  - Roman Omurbekov
- Swimming
  - Albert Bakaev
  - Vladimir Chesnov
  - Aleksei Kapoura
  - Vitaly Khutornoy
  - Vitalii Krylov
  - Juri Likorovsky
  - Nikolay Ponamarev
  - Nikolay Rogozhin
  - Vladimir Vshivtsev
- Table Tennis
  - Vladimir Polkanov
  - Valery Vishnjakov
  - Sergey Zuev
- Volleyball
  - Gadji Abakarov
  - Igor Bondar
  - A. Gontcharenko
  - Victor Krasnov
  - Alexander Kukatov
  - Murad Makhanov
  - Radjab Mamaev
  - Vladimir Maysak
  - Petr Ostrinsky
  - Iouri Soubbota
  - Peter Zubov

Women

- Archery
  - Tatiana Grishko
- Athletics
  - Rimma Batalova
  - Olga Churkina
  - Irina Leontiouk
  - Ljubov Malakhova
  - Olga Nazarenko
  - Tamara Pankova
  - Tamara Sivakova
  - Raisa Zhuravleva
- Swimming
  - Olga Melnikova
  - Natalia Parshina

=== Winter Games ===
Men

- Alpine skiing
  - Alexey Bargojakov
  - Ivan Chaprygin
  - Oleg Krasavin
  - Alexei Moshkine
  - Oleg Vasiljev
- Biathlon
  - Artiom Afanasiev
  - Boris Bogdanov
  - Nikolai Ilioutchenko
  - Vladimir Kolesnikov
  - Sergei Lozhkin
  - Lev Seleznev
  - Andrei Venediktov
- Cross-country skiing
  - Artiom Afanasiev
  - Boris Bogdanov
  - Nikolai Ilioutchenko
  - Vasily Koczekin
  - Vladimir Kolesnikov
  - Valeriy Kupchinski
  - Sergei Lozhkin
  - Vasily Petrochuk
  - Igor Pustovit
  - Lev Seleznev
  - Andrei Venediktov

Women

- Alpine skiing
  - Zinaida Emlina
- Cross-country skiing
  - Nadezhda Chirkova
  - Alevitina Elesina
  - Olga Nazarenko
  - Lubov Paninykii

== See also ==
- Unified Team at the Olympics
- Independent Paralympic Participants at the 1992 Summer Paralympics
- Korean Unification Flag
- CIS national football team
