= List of Nepalese people =

This is a list of notable Nepali people.

== Academics ==
- Harka Gurung, geologist, anthropologist, and author
- Sushant Subedi, global Nepali economist
- Gautama V. Vajracharya, historian
- Surya Subedi, legal academic

== Athletes ==
=== Cricketers ===
- Basanta Regmi
- Bikash Dali
- Dhirendra Chand
- Gyanendra Malla
- Jitendra Mukhiya
- Kanishka Chaugai
- Mehboob Alam
- Manoj Baishya
- Manoj Katuwal
- Naresh Budhayer
- Paras Khadka
- Raj Pradhan
- Raju Basnyat
- Raju Khadka
- Rajesh Pulami
- Shakti Gauchan
- Sharad Vesawkar
- Sompal Kami
- Sandeep Lamichhane
- Lalit Rajbanshi

=== Footballers ===
- Anil Gurung
- Anjan Bista
- Ananta Tamang
- Bharat Khawas
- Bimal Gharti Magar
- Bikesh Kuthu
- Bikram Lama
- Biraj Maharjan
- Jagjit Shrestha
- Ju Manu Rai
- Karna Limbu
- Nawayug Shrestha
- Nirajan Rayamajhi
- Rabin Shrestha
- Ranjan Bista
- Rohit Chand
- Sunil Chhetri, Indian footballer
- Upendra Man Singh

=== Swimmers ===
- Gaurika Singh
- Karishma Karki
- Sofia Shah
- Sirish Gurung

=== Taekwondo ===
- Palesha Goverdhan is a Nepali para taekwondo practitioner. She competed at the 2020 Summer Paralympics and 2024 Summer Paralympics and won a bronze medal, becoming the first Nepalese athlete to win a medal at the Paralympics.
- Bidhan Lama won bronze medals at the 1986 Asian Games, 1987 World Taekwondo Championships and at the 1988 Summer Olympics
- Manbahadur Tamang (1958 – 24 February 2001) was a Nepalese taekwondo practitioner. He competed in the men's featherweight at the 1988 Summer Olympics
- Pramila Thapa Won First Gold Medal in Nepal History (1991) World invitational Taekwondo Championships (Malaysia)
- Sangina Baidya was a Nepalese taekwondo practitioner. She competed at the 2004 Summer Olympics
- Deepak Bista was a Nepalese taekwondo practitioner. He competed at the 2008 Summer Olympics
- Nisha Rawal (taekwondo) was a Nepalese taekwondo practitioner. She competed at the 2016 Summer Olympics
- Kabiraj Negi Lama is a notable figure in Nepalese Para Taekwondo and a successful coach who has made significant contributions to the sport in Nepal.
- Ashmita Khadka was a Nepalese taekwondo practitioner.
- Bharat Singh Mahata is a Nepali para taekwondo practitioner. He competed at the 2024 Summer Paralympics.
- Ayasha Shakya was a Nepalese taekwondo practitioner.
- Shrijana Ghising was a Nepalese para taekwondo practitioner.

=== Other athletes ===
- Mohan Bam, judo practitioner
- Shyam Dhakal, alpine skier
- Sipora Gurung, volleyball player
- Jayaram Khadka, cross-country skier
- Mandil Pradhan, mountain biker
- Manikala Rai, ultramarathon runner
- Dachhiri Sherpa, cross-country skier
- Bimala Tamang, karateka
- Devu Thapa, judo practitioner
- Mira Rai, ultramarathon runner

== Entertainment ==
=== Filmmakers ===
- Rajesh Hamal
- Dayaram Dahal
- Saugat Malla
- Hari Bansha Acharya
- Satya Raj Chaulagain
- Subash Gajurel
- Tulsi Ghimire
- Manisha Koirala
- Nischal Basnet
- Priyanka Karki
- Rekha Thapa
- Deepa Shree Niraula

=== Other entertainers ===
- Atul Gautam, tabla player
- Hom Nath Upadhyaya, tabla player
- Prabal Gurung, fashion designer
- Teriya Magar, dancer and reality TV show winner
- Santosh Shah, celebrity chef
- Shiba Subedi, lyricist and songwriter

== Entrepreneurs ==
- Binod Chaudhary, businessman, industrialist, and philanthropist
- Karna Shakya, businessman, industrialist, and philanthropist

== Humanitarians ==
- Pushpa Basnet, founder of Nepal's Early Childhood Development Center
- Sunita Danuwar, founder of Shakti Samuha, an anti-sex trafficking organization
- Tikendra Dal Dewan, retired British Army Gurkha, campaigner for Gurkha welfare
- Durga Ghimire, founder of ABC Nepal, an anti-sex trafficking organization
- Jagadish Ghimire, political analyst, founder of Tamakoshi Sewa Samiti community development organization
- Angur Baba Joshi, education activist and first female school principal in Nepal
- Daya Bir Singh Kansakar, founder of Paropakar Organization, Nepal's first social service organization
- Anuradha Koirala, founder of Maiti Nepal, which supports victims of sex trafficking
- Sarina Prabasi, CEO of WaterAid America
- Mahabir Pun, founder of the Nepal Wireless Networking Project
- Indira Ranamagar, founder of Prisoner's Assistance Nepal
- Himani Shah, chairman of the Himani Trust, former crown princess of Nepal
- Tara Devi Tuladhar, social worker and education activist

== Mountaineers ==
- Babu Chiri Sherpa
- Tenzing Norgay
- Jamling Tenzing Norgay
- Nirmal Purja
- Ang Rita
- Apa Sherpa
- Moni Mulepati
- Nawang Sherpa
- Pasang Lhamu Sherpa
- Pem Dorjee Sherpa
- Shambu Tamang
- Hari Budha Magar
- Shriya Shah-Klorfine
- Kami Rita Sherpa
- Mingma Gyalje Sherpa
- Mingma Gyabu Sherpa
- Pasang Dawa Sherpa
- Kilu Pemba Sherpa

== Royal and former ruling family ==
- Princess Jayanti of Nepal
- Princess Jyotshana Basnyat of Nepal
- Queen Tripurasundari of Nepal

== Scientists ==
- Muni Sakya, computer scientist
- Drona Prakash Rasali, veterinarian
- Bodhraj Acharya, biochemist
- Sushila Maharjan, biochemist, biotechnologist
- Lujendra Ojha, planetary scientist

=== Physicians ===
- Bhola Rijal
- Govinda K.C.
- Ram I. Mahato
- Toshima Karki
- Bhagawan Koirala

== Writers ==
=== Poets ===
- Banira Giri
- Bhanubhakta Acharya
- Byakul Maila
- Durga Lal Shrestha
- Geeta Tripathee
- Gopal Prasad Rimal
- Ishwar Ballav
- Ishwar Ballav
- Jagadish Ghimire
- Krishnahari Baral
- Kshetra Pratap Adhikary
- Kul Bahadur KC
- Laxmi Prasad Devkota
- Lekh Nath Paudel
- Mahananda Sapkota
- Mahananda Sapkota
- Motiram Bhatta
- Neer Shah
- Shrawan Mukarung
- Sidhhi Charan Shrestha
- Suman Pokhrel
- Toya Gurung

=== Journalists ===
- Kanak Mani Dixit
- Narayan Wagle
- Naresh Bhattarai
- Prashant Aryal
- Rabi Lamichhane
- Rabindra Mishra
- Sudheer Sharma
- Uma Singh
- Vijay Kumar Pandey

=== Playwrights ===
- Abhi Subedi
- Ashesh Malla
- Balkrishna Sama
- Bhim Nidhi Tiwari
- Gopal Prasad Rimal
- Guru Prasad Mainali
- Khagendra Lamichhane
- Laxmi Prasad Devkota
- Saru Bhakta
- Satya Mohan Joshi
- Shrawan Mukarung
- Suman Pokhrel

=== Prose writers ===
- Abhi Subedi
- Amar Neupane
- Arbind Rimal
- Manjushree Thapa
- Parijat
- Rajan Mukarung
- Samrat Upadhyay
- Sanu Sharma
- Shashikala Manandhar
- Sushma Joshi
- Toya Gurung

== Other notables ==
- Bhawana Ghimire, CEO of Cricket Association of Nepal from 2014 to 2016
- Asta Narayan Manandhar, established the first bicycle shop in Kathmandu in 1925
