= Manandhar =

Manandhar is a surname. Notable people with the surname include:

- Asta Narayan Manandhar (1900–1960), Nepalese entrepreneur
- Baikuntha Manandhar (born 1951), Nepali marathon runner
- Basanta Prasad Manandhar, Nepalese politician
- Evana Manandhar, Nepalese businesswoman
- Karishma Manandhar, Nepalese actress
- Kiran Manandhar (born 1957), Nepalese painter
- Melina Manandhar (born 1975), Nepalese actress
- Narayan Manandhar (born 1981), Nepalese footballer
- Ram Bir Manandhar, Nepalese politician
- Shanta Das Manandhar (1934–2023), Nepalese writer
- Shashikala Manandhar (born 1960), Nepalese novelist
- Sonika Manandhar (born 1990), Nepali computer engineer
- Sulochana Manandhar (born 1955), Nepali poet
