= Sanjiv Nepali =

Sportspeople from Nepal

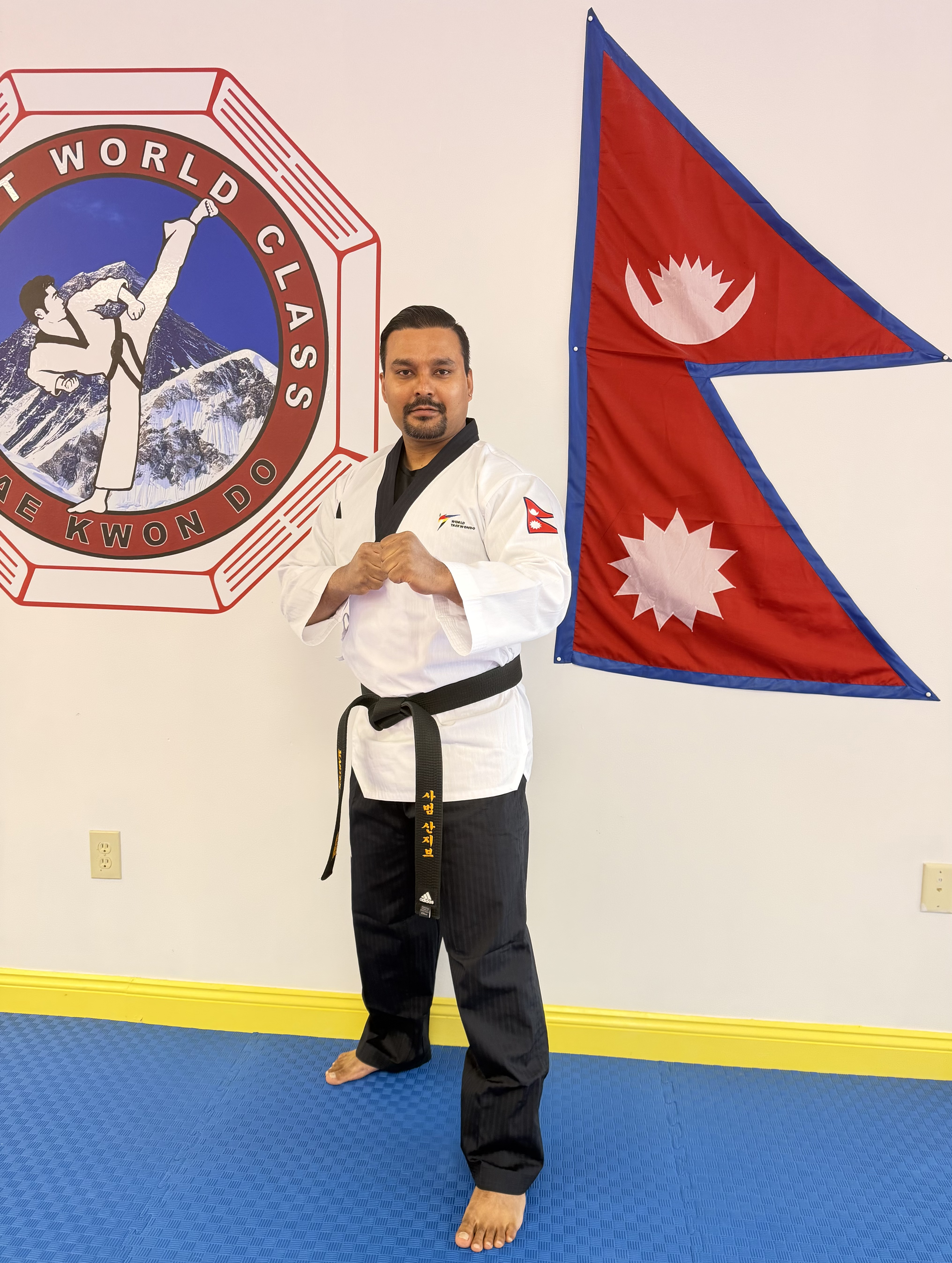
- Master Sanjiv Nepali, 5th Dan Black Belt (2025)
- Born: 17 August 1986 (age 40); Bara (Nijgadh Municipality), Nepal
- Nationality: Nepali
- Rank: 5th Degree Black Belt (World Taekwondo Headquarters)

Sanjiv Nepali (born 17 August 1986) is a Nepali taekwondo practitioner, coach, and referee. He holds a 5th Dan Black Belt certified by World Taekwondo Headquarters. Nepali has represented Nepal and won gold medals in international Taekwondo championships held in the United Kingdom, Spain, Hong Kong, and other countries.

== Early life ==
Nepali was born in Bara District, Nepal, in Nijgadh Municipality. He developed an interest in Taekwondo at an early age and began training around 1998–1999 in Nepal.

== Career ==
=== Athletic achievements ===
- Gold medal – British Autumn Open Championship, Manchester, UK (2019)
- Gold medal – 22nd Asian Cities Taekwondo Championship, Hong Kong (2018)
- Silver medal – 16th Hong Kong–Nepal Taekwondo Federation Championship (2018)
- Bronze medal – 20th International Taekwondo Championship, Barcelona, Spain (2019)
- Multiple international gold medals in events across the USA, UK, Canada, Philippines, Indonesia, Japan, Thailand, Spain, China, Macau, and Nepal.

=== Coaching and officiating ===
Nepali has served as a referee and judge in various national and international Taekwondo competitions, including events in Macau, the USA, and other countries. He has also trained athletes in Nepal, Macau, and the United States.

== Honors ==
He received appreciation and recognition from Nepal's National Sports Council, the Nepal Taekwondo Association, Nijgadh Municipality, and the Madhesh Province government.
