= Nepal at the Deaflympics =

- IPC code: NEP
- NPC: National Deaf Sports Committee-Nepal (NDSC)
- Website: www.deaflympics.com/countries/NEP
- Medals: Gold 0 Silver 0 Bronze 0 Total 0

Summer appearances
- 2013; 2017; 2021

Winter appearances
- 2019; 2023

Nepal has competed in karate and judo at the Deaflympics since 2013. Nepal competed in chess at the 2019 Winter Deaflympics.

== Medal tallies ==
=== Summer Deaflympics ===
Event	Gold	Silver	Bronze	Total
2013	0	0	0	0
2017	0	0	0	0

=== Winter Deaflympics ===
Event	Gold	Silver	Bronze	Total
2019	0	0	0	0

== See also ==
- Nepal at the Olympics
- Nepal at the Paralympics
