= Nepal at the 2024 Summer Paralympics =

2024 sporting event delegation in Paris

- Flag of Nepal
- IPC code: NEP
- NPC: National Paralympic Committee (NPC) – Nepal
- Website: paralympic.org.np

in Paris, France August 28, 2024 – September 8, 2024
- Competitors: 3 (2 men and 1 woman) in 2 sports
- Flag bearer: Palesha Goverdhan
- Medals Ranked 79th: Gold 0 Silver 0 Bronze 1 Total 1

Summer Paralympics appearances (overview)
- 2004; 2008; 2012; 2016; 2020; 2024

Nepal competed at the 2024 Summer Paralympics in Paris, France, from 28 August to 8 September 2024.

Nepalese athletes made their Olympic Games debut at the 1964 Summer Olympics and their Paralympic Games debut at the 2004 Summer Paralympics. However, Nepal had not secured an official medal in either event—until taekwondo athlete Palesha Goverdhan made history by winning a bronze medal at the Paris 2024 Paralympic Games. This marked Nepal’s first-ever medal in the Paralympic or Olympic Games. For this achievement, Palesha Goverdhan was awarded रू65 lakh (US$48,000) by Prime Minister KP Oli on behalf of the Government of Nepal on 13 September 2024.

== Medalists ==
The following Nepalese competitors won medals at the games. In the discipline sections below, the medalists' names are bolded.

Medal	Name	Sport	Event	Date
Bronze	Palesha Goverdhan	Taekwondo	Women's −57 kg	30 August

Medals by sport
Sport	1st place, gold medalist(s)	2nd place, silver medalist(s)	3rd place, bronze medalist(s)	Total
Taekwondo	0	0	1	**1**
Total	0	0	1	1

== Competitors ==
The following is the list of number of competitors in the Games, including game-eligible alternates in team sports.

Sport	Men	Women	Total
Swimming	1	0	1
Taekwondo	1	1	2
Total	2	1	3

== Swimming ==
Athlete	Event	Heat		Final	
Athlete	Event	Time	Rank	Time	Rank
Bhim Bahadur Kumal	Men's 50 m freestyle S9	35.08	19	Did not advance	

== Taekwondo ==
Athlete	Event	First round	Quarterfinals	Repechage 1	Repechage 2	Semifinals	Final / BM	
Athlete	Event	Opposition Result	Opposition Result	Opposition Result	Opposition Result	Opposition Result	Opposition Result	Rank
Bharat Singh Mahata	Men's −58 kg	Tanaka (JPN); **L** 3–19	Did not advance					
**Palesha Goverdhan**	Women's −57 kg	Morales (VEN); **W** 31-0	Fernandes (BRA); **L** 8-10	Caverzan (FRA); **W** 2-1	—N/a	—N/a	Micev (SRB); **W** 15-8	3rd place, bronze medalist(s)

== See also ==
- Nepal at the 2024 Summer Olympics
- Nepal at the Paralympics
