= Nepal at the Paralympics =

- IPC code: NEP
- NPC: National Paralympic Committee Nepal
- Medals: Gold 0 Silver 0 Bronze 1 Total 1

Summer appearances
- 2004; 2008; 2012; 2016; 2020; 2024

Nepal made its Paralympic Games début at the 2004 Summer Paralympics in Athens, sending just one athlete to compete in women's shot put. The country has taken part in every Summer Paralympics since, but has never participated in the Winter Paralympics. Nepal won its first ever Paralympic medal at the 2024 Summer Paralympics.

Nepalese athletes made their Paralympic Games debut at the 2004 Summer Paralympics. However, Nepal had not secured an official medal in either event—until taekwondo athlete Palesha Goverdhan made history by winning a bronze medal at the Paris 2024 Paralympic Games. This marked Nepal’s first-ever official medal in the Paralympic or Olympic Games, placing the country on the Paralympic medal tally for the very first time. For this historic and remarkable achievement, Palesha Goverdhan was awarded रू65 lakh (US$43,000) by the Nepalese prime minister KP Oli on behalf of the Government of Nepal on 13 September 2024.

== Full results for Nepal at the Paralympics ==
Name	Games	Sport	Event	Score	Rank
Nirmala Gyawali	2004 Athens	Athletics	Women's shot put F12	no mark	unranked (nmr)
Jit Bahadur Khadka	2008 Beijing	Athletics	Men's 100m T46	14.23	6th in heat 1; did not advance
Bikram Rana	2012 London	Athletics	Men's 100m T11	12.81	4th in heat 4; did not advance
Bikram Rana	2012 London	Athletics	Men's 200m T11	26.95	4th in heat 2; did not advance
Maiya Bisunkhe	2012 London	Athletics	Women's 100m T46	16.48	6th in heat 1; did not advance
Maiya Bisunkhe	2012 London	Athletics	Women's 200m T46	36.32	6th in heat 1; did not advance
Bikram Rana	2016 Rio	Athletics	Men's 100m T11	13.02	4th in heat 5; did not advance
Laxmi Kunwar	2016 Rio	Swimming	Women's 100m freestyle S6	3:11.76	6th in heat 2; did not advance
Palesha Goverdhan	2020 Tokyo	Taekwondo	Women's -58 Kg, K44	Won Repechage match against United States and Serbia athletes	5th Position
Palesha Goverdhan	2024 Paris	Taekwondo	Women's -57 Kg	Won bronze medal match against Serbia athlete	3rd place, bronze medalist(s)
Bharat Singh Mahata	2024 Paris	Taekwondo	Men's -58 Kg, K44	Bharat Singh Mahata (NEP) 3 vs Mitsuya Tanaka (JPN) 19	Round of 16
Bhim Bahadur Kumal	2024 Paris	Swimming	Men's 50 m freestyle	35.08	19th in heats; did not advance

=== Medals by Summer sport ===
Sport	Gold	Silver	Bronze	Total
Taekwondo	0	0	1	1
Totals (1 entries)	0	0	1	1

== See also ==
- Nepal at the Olympics
