= Negi =

Negi may refer to:

- Negi, the Japanese name for Allium fistulosum (Welsh onion)
- Negi (surname) (including a list of persons with the name)
- Negi (comedian), a Filipino comedian
- Kabiraj Negi Lama, Nepalese taekwondo athlete, National Para Taekwondo Team Coach and 2020 Summer Paralympics Coach
- Negi Springfield, the protagonist of the manga "Negima! Magister Negi Magi"
- Negi Haruba, Japanese manga artist
