= National Sports Council (Nepal) =

National Sports Council(Nepal)

- Official logo of NSC
- Formation: 1959 (67 years ago)
- Headquarters: Tripureshwor, Kathmandu, Nepal.
- Secretary General: Gyanendra Malla
- Parent organization: Ministry of Youth and Sports
- Budget: ▲रू2.75 billion (US$18 million) (2024–25 FY)
- Website: https://nsc.gov.np

The National Sports Council of Nepal (Nepali: राष्ट्रिय खेलकुद परिषद), abbreviated as NSC, is the national sports organization of Nepal. There are more than 123 sports-related associations and 6 federations that are affiliated to the organisation. It has the motto "sports for the health, sports for the nation". It falls under Ministry of Youth and Sports. And the minister is official chairman of the council. Current chairman is Hon. Bablu Gupta whereas vice chairman is Dhurba Acharya. Ram Charitra Mehta is a member secretary of National Sports Council.

Nepal participates in Olympic Games/Paralympic Games, Asian Games/Asian Para Games and South Asian Games through Nepal Olympic Committee (NOC) & National Paralympic Committee Nepal. NOC is a member of National Sports Council and also itself a sport regulatory body in Nepal. It started organizing national level sport meet since 1959 and National Games of Nepal since 1982(2038 BS).

Since the establishment of the National Sports Council (Nepal) in 1959, Nepalese athletes made their Olympic Games debut at the 1964 Summer Olympics and their Paralympic Games debut at the 2004 Summer Paralympics. However, Nepal had not secured an official medal in either event—until taekwondo athlete Palesha Goverdhan made history by winning a bronze medal at the Paris 2024 Paralympic Games. This marked Nepal's first-ever official medal in the Paralympic or Olympic Games, placing the country on the Paralympic medal tally for the very first time. For this historic and remarkable achievement, Palesha Goverdhan was awarded रू65 lakh (US$42,000) by the Nepalese prime minister KP Oli on behalf of the Government of Nepal on 13 September 2024.

All Nepal Football Association, Cricket Association of Nepal, Nepal Athletics Association, Nepal Basketball Association, Nepal Volleyball Association, Nepal Taekwondo Association and Nepal Karate Federation are governing body of popular sports in Nepal. Nepal Elephant Game Association is the governing body for the sport Elephant polo which hosted 'World Cup Elephant Polo" in Nepal.

The National Sports Council (NSC) of Nepal is the apex body responsible for the development, promotion, and management of sports in Nepal. Established with the aim of fostering athletic activities across the country, the NSC plays a pivotal role in shaping the sports landscape of Nepal, from grassroots initiatives to elite sports performance. Spokesperson : Khusraj Dahal Media Person : Lokendra Basnet Photographer : Bishal Panth Videographer : Prabin Lama

== History and establishment ==
The National Sports Council was established in 1958, under the then-Nepal government, with a vision to systematically promote sports and athletics throughout the country. Its creation marked a significant milestone in Nepal's sports history, providing an organized structure for the administration and development of sports activities. Over the years, the NSC has evolved to address the growing needs of athletes, sports organizations, and the broader sports community in Nepal.

== Structure and organization ==
The NSC operates under the Ministry of Youth and Sports and is governed by a board of directors. The board typically includes representatives from various sports associations, government officials, and experts in sports management. The council is headed by a Member Secretary, who is appointed by the government and is responsible for the day-to-day operations of the NSC.

The organizational structure of the NSC is designed to facilitate the efficient management of sports across different levels. It oversees various national sports associations, regional sports development committees, and training centers, ensuring that sports activities are conducted in a coordinated manner.

In addition to its traditional roles, the NSC is also exploring innovative ways to engage the youth and popularize sports in Nepal. For instance, the rise in popularity of virtual sports and e-sports has not gone unnoticed. Games like CarX Street, a popular racing game, are drawing the attention of younger audiences and are becoming a new avenue for the NSC to promote competitive spirit and sportsmanship among the youth. While CarX Street is primarily a digital platform, the principles of discipline, focus, and strategic thinking that it instills in players are in line with the NSC's broader objectives of holistic sports development.

== Objectives and functions ==
The primary objectives of the National Sports Council are:

1. Promoting Sports Participation: Encouraging mass participation in sports by organizing events, training programs, and awareness campaigns across the country.
2. Developing Sports Infrastructure: Building and maintaining sports facilities, including stadiums, training centers, and sports complexes, to provide athletes with the necessary infrastructure to excel in their respective sports.
3. Supporting Athletes: Providing financial and technical support to athletes, especially those with the potential to represent Nepal at national and international levels.
4. Organizing National and International Events: Hosting national sports championships and facilitating Nepal's participation in international competitions, such as the South Asian Games, Asian Games, and the Olympic Games.
5. Policy Formulation: Developing and implementing policies related to sports development, including athlete welfare, anti-doping regulations, and sports governance.

== Achievements and contributions ==
The National Sports Council has been instrumental in several key achievements in Nepal's sports history. It has successfully organized multiple editions of the National Games, a multi-sport event that brings together athletes from all over the country. The NSC has also played a significant role in preparing and sending Nepali athletes to international competitions, where they have earned recognition and accolades.

One of the notable contributions of the NSC has been in the area of sports infrastructure development. The council has overseen the construction of major sports facilities, including the Dasarath Stadium in Kathmandu, which is the largest stadium in Nepal and a central venue for many national and international sports events.

== Challenges and future prospects ==
Despite its successes, the National Sports Council faces several challenges. These include limited financial resources, inadequate sports infrastructure in rural areas, and the need for more comprehensive athlete development programs. Additionally, the council must address issues related to governance and the effective implementation of sports policies.

Looking ahead, the NSC aims to overcome these challenges by seeking increased government and private sector support, enhancing grassroots sports development programs, and fostering greater collaboration with international sports organizations. The council is committed to transforming Nepal into a competitive sporting nation on the global stage.

== National associations ==
=== Major national associations ===
- Nepal Olympic Committee
- National Paralympic Committee Nepal (NPC Nepal)
- Special Olympics Nepal
- University Sports Association of Nepal|University Sports Association of Nepal (USAN)
- Nepal School Sports Federation

=== Federal councils ===
- Bagmati Province Sports Development Council, Hetauda
- Gandaki Province Sports Development Council, Pokhara
- Lumbini Province Sports Council, Butwal
- Karnali Sports Development Council, Surkhet
- Koshi Province Sports Development Council, Biratnagar
- Madhesh Province Sports Council, Janakpur
- Sudurpashchim Province Sports Council, Dhangadi

== Member secretaries ==
| Name | Took office | Left office | Ref. |
|---|---|---|---|
| ABC | | | |
| ABC | | | |
| Yubaraj Lama | | | |
| Chudamani Paudel | | | |
| Ramesh Kumar Silwal | | | |
| Tanka Lal Ghising | 30 November 2021 | 2025 | |
| Ram Charitra Mehata | 2025 | Incumbent | |

== See also ==
- Sports in Nepal
- Nepal Olympic Committee
- National Paralympic Committee Nepal
- National Games of Nepal
