= World Taekwondo Gala Awards =

Award ceremony

- Presented by: World Taekwondo
- First award: 5 December 2014

The World Taekwondo Gala Awards are an annual award ceremony hosted by World Taekwondo. The first edition was held on 5 December 2014 in Querétaro, Mexico.

== Winners ==
=== Player of the Year ===
Year	Winner	
Year	Male	Female
2014	(South Korea) Lee Dae-hoon	(United Kingdom) Jade Jones
2015	(South Korea) Lee Dae-hoon (2)	(China) Wu Jingyu
2016	(Jordan) Ahmad Abughaush	(United Kingdom) Jade Jones (2)
2017	(South Korea) Lee Dae-hoon (3)	(United Kingdom) Bianca Walkden
2018	(South Korea) Lee Dae-hoon (4)	(Turkey) İrem Yaman
2019	(South Korea) Jang Jun	(Thailand) Panipak Wongpattanakit
2022	(Italy) Simone Alessio	(Thailand) Panipak Wongpattanakit (2)
2023	(Ivory Coast) Cheick Sallah Cissé	(Turkey) Merve Dinçel
2024	(Uzbekistan) Ulugbek Rashitov	(Hungary) Viviana Márton
2025	(Brazil) Henrique Marques	(Belgium) Sarah Chaâri

=== Para Athlete of the Year ===
Year	Winner	
Year	Male	Female
2022	(Turkey) Mahmut Bozteke	(Turkey) Meryem Betül Çavdar
2023	(Italy) Antonino Bossolo	(Mexico) Cláudia Romero
2024	(Azerbaijan) Imamaddin Khalilov	(Peru) Leonor Espinoza
2025	(Morocco) Ayoub Adouich	(China) Li Yujie

=== Coach of the Year ===
Year	Winner	Team/athlete(s)
2014	(South Korea) Bang Young-in	Mexico national taekwondo team
2015	(Egypt) Gulash Alonso	Egypt national taekwondo team
2016	(Iran) Reza Mehmandoust	Azerbaijan national taekwondo team
2017	(Serbia) Dragan Jović	(Serbia) Taekwondo Club Galeb; Milica Mandić, Tijana Bogdanović, Vanja Stanković
2018	(Turkey) Ali Şahin	Turkey national taekwondo team
2019	(Iran) Reza Mehmandoust (2)	Azerbaijan national taekwondo team
2022	(Serbia) Dragan Jović (2)	Serbia national taekwondo team
2023	(France) Rosendo Alonso	France national taekwondo team
2024	(Kazakhstan) Yesbul Sultanov	Tunisia national taekwondo team
2025	(Tunisia) Hechmi Jendoubi	Tunisia national taekwondo team

=== Para Taekwondo Coach of the Year ===
Year	Winner	Team/athlete(s)
2022	(Uzbekistan) Bobur Kuziev	Uzbekistan national para taekwondo team
2023	(Brazil) Rodrigo Ferla	Brazil national para taekwondo team
2024	(United Kingdom) Andrew Deer	(United Kingdom) Great Britain national para taekwondo team
2025	(Nepal) Kabiraj Lama	Nepal national para taekwondo team

=== Kick of the Year ===
Year	Winner
2014	
2015	(Moldova) Aaron Cook
2016	(Ivory Coast) Cheick Sallah Cissé
2017	(Moldova) Aaron Cook (2)
2018	(Moldova) Aaron Cook (3)
2019	(South Korea) In Kyo-don
2022	(Mexico) Daniela Souza
2023	(Ivory Coast) Ruth Gbagbi
2024	(South Korea) Park Tae-joon
2025	(United States) CJ Nickolas

=== Member National Association (MNA) of the Year ===
Year	Winner
2014	(Mexico) Mexican Taekwondo Federation
2015	(Russia) Russian Taekwondo Federation
2016	Azerbaijan Taekwondo Federation
2017	(South Korea) Korea Taekwondo Association
2018	(United Arab Emirates) UAE Taekwondo Federation (Italy) Italian Taekwondo Federation
2019	(Russia) Russian Taekwondo Federation

=== Referee of the Year ===
Year	Winner	
Year	Male	Female
2014	(Puerto Rico) Neydis Tavarez	
2015	(Morocco) Tarik Benradi	(Thailand) Kalay Suddai
2016	(Canada) Kim Song-chul	(Georgia (country)) Maria Merkouri
2017	(Belgium) Abdelkhalek Chbibi	(Lebanon) Julie Dib
2018	(Egypt) Mohamed Adel Abdelfattah	(Belarus) Ksenia Choucha
2019	(Russia) Denis Kim	(Serbia) Ksenia Levai

=== National Team of the Year ===
Year	Winner
2014	
2015	
2016	
2017	(South Korea) Korea national taekwondo team
2018	
2019	

=== Best Continental Union of the Year ===
Year	Winner
2014	
2015	
2016	
2017	(African Union) World Taekwondo Africa
2018	
2019	

==== Most Improved MNA of the Year ====
Year	Winner
2014	
2015	
2016	
2017	
2018	
2019	(Brazil) Brazilian Taekwondo Federation

=== Fair Play Award ===
Year	Winner(s)	Event
2014		
2015		
2016		
2017		
2018		
2019	(United Kingdom) Mahama Cho and (Kazakhstan) Ruslan Zhaparov	(Italy) 2019 Grand Prix Series 1 men's +80 kg semi-finals

== Ceremonies ==
The ceremonies are typically held one day after the annual Grand Prix final, and hosted in the same city.

Edition	Date	Venue	Ref
1	5 December 2014	(Mexico) Centro de Congresos Queretaro, Querétaro	
2	7 December 2015	Mexico National Theater, Mexico City	
3	11 December 2016	(Azerbaijan) Badamdar Hotel, Baku	
4	4 December 2017	(Ivory Coast) Radisson Blue Hotel, Abidjan	
5	23 November 2018	(United Arab Emirates) Fujairah National Theater, Fujairah	
6	7 December 2019	(Russia) Lotte Plaza Hotel, Moscow	
