= National Paralympic Committee Nepal =

National Paralympic Committee of Nepal

National Paralympic Committee
- Country: Nepal
- Code: NEP
- Created: 2000; 26 years ago
- Recognized: 2004; 22 years ago
- Continental association: APC
- Headquarters: Jorpati, Kathmandu, Nepal
- President: Radha Ghale
- Secretary General: Pashupati Parajull
- Website: paralympic.org.np

National Paralympic Committee Nepal (Nepali: राष्ट्रिय पाराओलम्पिक कमिटि नेपाल; NPC code: NEP) is responsible for selecting athletes to represent Nepal at the Paralympic Games, Asian Para Games and other international para sports competitions, and managing Nepalese teams at these events. NPC Nepal is dedicated to promoting sports for individuals with disabilities. The main focus of the committee is to organize, supervise, and coordinate sports events and competitions for them.

Nepalese athletes made their Paralympic Games debut at the 2004 Summer Paralympics. However, Nepal had not secured an official medal at the Games until taekwondo athlete Palesha Goverdhan made history by winning a bronze medal at the 2024 Summer Paralympics in Paris. This marked Nepal’s first-ever official medal in the Paralympic Games, placing the country on the Paralympic medal tally for the very first time. For this historic and remarkable achievement, Palesha Goverdhan was awarded रू65 lakh (US$43,000) by the Nepalese prime minister K. P. Sharma Oli on behalf of the Government of Nepal on 13 September 2024.

== NPC Summer Paralympics sports ==
Sport	National Association
Aquatics	Nepal Para Swimming Association
Archery	Nepal Para Archery Association
Athletics	Nepal Para Athletics Association
Badminton	Nepal Para Badminton Association
Basketball	Nepal Para Basketball Association
Cycling	Nepal Para Cycling Association
Judo	Nepal Judo Association
Shooting	Nepal Para Shooting Association
Table tennis	Nepal Para Table Tennis Association
Taekwondo	Nepal Taekwondo Association
Tennis	Nepal Para Tennis Association
Volleyball	Nepal Para Volleyball Association
Weightlifting	Nepal Para Weightlifting Association

== See also ==
- Nepal at the Paralympics
