= OLE Nepal =

Open Learning Exchange Nepal
- Formation: 2007
- Type: Non-profit
- Headquarters: Kathmandu, Nepal
- Official language: English, Nepali
- Executive Director: Rabi Karmacharya
- Key people: Mohan Das Manandhar, Dr. Sudhindra Sharma, Anil Chitrakar, Jyoti Man Sherchan, Mr. Prithivi Bahadur Pande
- Website: olenepal.org

Open Learning Exchange Nepal (OLE Nepal) is a non-government social organization working to increase access to education through the integration of technology. Founded in 2007, the organization aims to increase the quality of education through the creation of open-source digital learning activities combined with teacher training.

OLE Nepal's program is currently running in fifty schools in sixteen districts in partnership with Nepal Government's Department of Education (DoE) with support from development partners including the Danish Government's Local Grant Authority, United Nations World Food Programme (WFP) and Finnish Government's Funds for Local Cooperation.

OLE Nepal and Nepal's DoE recently started the implementation of the One Laptop per Child (OLPC) program in fifteen schools in three new districts. Students from different classes share a set of laptops but each student has one-to-one access to laptops and digital resources during class. In addition to significant cost savings, this model makes it easier for schools and teachers to manage the programs.

== History ==
In early 2007, Rabi Karmacharya and Bryan Berry left their jobs in the technology sector to launch OLE Nepal. Previously they had been part of a group of volunteers who had been meeting and discussing the possibility of leveraging the One Laptop Per Child laptops to address the challenges faced by educators in the country. They met and discussed with various educators, teachers, experts, activists, community leaders, donors, and government officials going on to form the Board of Directors, and registering the organization. In the process, they received much support from Mahabir Pun, a Nepali teacher and activist who created the Nepal Wireless Networking Project. Dr. Saurav Dev Bhatta also joined as one of the founding members when the organization was officially launched in September 2007.

== Current projects ==
OLE Nepal's Information and communications technology (ICT) education programs are currently running in 50 schools in 16 districts across Nepal benefiting more than 10,000 students. OLE Nepal has also trained over 300 school teachers on how to integrate technology in classroom teaching/learning processes. OLE Nepal has prepared an extensive collection of interactive digital learning materials that are based on the school curricula. OLE Nepal has also developed a digital library that is installed on servers in each school.

The introduction of laptops to students and teachers is accompanied by the following activities:

- Development and distribution of free and open digital educational content
- Preparing teachers to integrate ICT in classroom teaching
- Research and development of appropriate technology and network infrastructure
- Capacity development

=== Digital content ===
OLE Nepal has developed two types of digital content: E-Paath and E-Pustakalaya.

==== E-Paath ====
An interactive science activity in E-Paath

E-Paath is a collection of subject-specific and grade-specific digital learning materials conceptualized by educators and curriculum experts. These interactive educational software modules are closely aligned with the national curriculum and are designed to help teachers and students meet the learning objectives outlined in the curriculum. These activities employ various features of technology such as audio, images, animation, and text to help students better understand concepts in multiple subjects.

==== E-Pustakalaya ====
E-Pustakalaya home page

E-Pustakalaya is an education-centered digital library containing full-text documents, books, educational videos, audio books, and interactive educational software that can be freely accessed through an intranet or on the Internet. OLE Nepal started the development of E-Pustakalaya with the aim of improving children's reading skills and developing a reading culture in schools by giving them free and open access to age-appropriate reading materials.

Users of E-Pustakalaya can browse through various sections looking for items they like, or they can search for specific items based on full or partial author name, title, publisher and/or keywords. Users can read books and documents, view videos, listen to audio clips, play educational games directly from E-Pustakalaya, and in the case of books and documents, download and store for later viewing. The E-Pustakalaya currently holds more than 4,000 titles.

While these resources can be accessed online, OLE Nepal has placed special emphasis on making them available in far flung schools that do not have Internet connectivity. E-Pustakalaya is hosted on low-cost low-power servers and installed in schools and community libraries that either do not have Internet connectivity or have low bandwidth connection.

=== Teacher training ===
OLE Nepal has developed and delivered training programs to help teachers integrate laptops and digital learning materials in classroom teaching. Teachers receive eight days of training before the deployment of computers in their schools. They take part in discussions and practice teaching to build both their skills and develop their confidence in using digital resources in their class.

In-School training is used as a monitoring tool to observe how much the teachers are using the materials in the classroom and what issues they have while doing so. This is conducted 4–6 weeks after the teacher training mentioned above.

Refresher training is organised to help teachers to revise what they learnt in previous training. This project also gives opportunity for teachers to share their issues and lessons learned. For OLE Nepal, it is an evaluation tool to review the effectiveness of the training and discover training strategies and / or content that needs to be reviewed.

=== Capacity building ===
OLE Nepal has worked in partnership with various central and local agencies within the Ministry of Education system to ensure that they build the necessary institutional capacity to implement ICT-based education on a national level. The project has benefited from the inputs provided by government trainers, curriculum experts, district level school supervisors, resource persons and teachers. The OLPC project was implemented in partnership with the Department of Education and the District Education Offices in the program districts.

The DoE and OLE Nepal have also worked together to promote awareness about ICT-based Education. Teacher trainings have been conducted with help of government trainers who were prepared in providing ICT-based Education training. OLE Nepal has consulted with subject experts from the Curriculum Development Center in the preparation and review of the E-Paath activities. OLE Nepal opts to work with and empower existing resources within the public education system instead of creating a parallel system.

== Deployment ==
OLE Nepal has deployed over 4000 XO laptops with the E-Paath software to 50 schools in 16 districts in Nepal as of August 1, 2012.

Schools By district:

- Banke
- Baglung
- Dadeldhura
- Dhanusha
- Doti
- Kavre
- Kapilvastu
- Lalitpur
- Mustang
- Makwanpur
- Rupandehi
- Solukhumbu
- Syangja
- Tanahun
