= Nepal at the 2004 Summer Paralympics =

- IPC code: NEP
- NPC: National Para Sports Association - Nepal

in Athens
- Competitors: 1 in 1 sport
- Flag bearer: Nirmala Gyawali
- Medals Ranked 76th: Gold 0 Silver 0 Bronze 0 Total 0

Summer Paralympics appearances (overview)
- 2004; 2008; 2012; 2016; 2020; 2024

Nepal competed at the 2004 Summer Paralympics in Athens, Greece. The team included 1 woman, but won no medals.

== Sports ==
=== Athletics ===
==== Women's field ====
Athlete	Class	Event	Final		
Athlete	Class	Event	Result	Points	Rank
Nirmala Gyawali	F12	Shot put	did not advance		

== See also ==
- Nepal at the Paralympics
- Nepal at the 2004 Summer Olympics
