= Nepal at the 2012 Summer Paralympics =

- IPC code: NEP
- NPC: National Para Sports Association - Nepal

in London
- Competitors: 2 in 1 sport
- Medals: Gold 0 Silver 0 Bronze 0 Total 0

Summer Paralympics appearances (overview)
- 2004; 2008; 2012; 2016; 2020; 2024

Nepal competed at the 2012 Summer Paralympics in London, United Kingdom from August 29 to September 9, 2012.

== Athletics ==
Men’s Track and Road Events

Athlete	Event	Heat		Semifinal		Final	
Athlete	Event	Result	Rank	Result	Rank	Result	Rank
Bikram Rana	100m T11	12.81	4	did not advance			
Bikram Rana	200m T11	26.94	4	did not advance			

Women’s Track and Road Events

Athlete	Event	Heat		Final	
Athlete	Event	Result	Rank	Result	Rank
Maiya Bisunkhe	100m T46	16.48	6	did not advance	
Maiya Bisunkhe	200m T46	36.32	6	did not advance	

== See also ==
- Nepal at the 2012 Summer Olympics
