= Bharatganj Singaul =

Coordinates: 27°15′N 85°14′E

Bharatganj Singaul भरतगञ्ज सिंगौल
- Town
- Interactive map of Bharatganj Singaul
- Country: Nepal
- Zone: Narayani Zone
- District: Bara District

Population (2011)
  - Total: 5,303
- male 2,516, female 2,787, households 1,097
- Time zone: UTC+5:45 (Nepal Time)

Bharatganj Singaul is a town under Nijgadh Municipality in Bara District in the Narayani Zone of south-central Nepal. As of the 2011 Nepal census it had a population of 5,303 (2,516 male, 2,787 female) people living in 1,097 individual households.
