= Sapkota (crater) =

Crater on Mercury

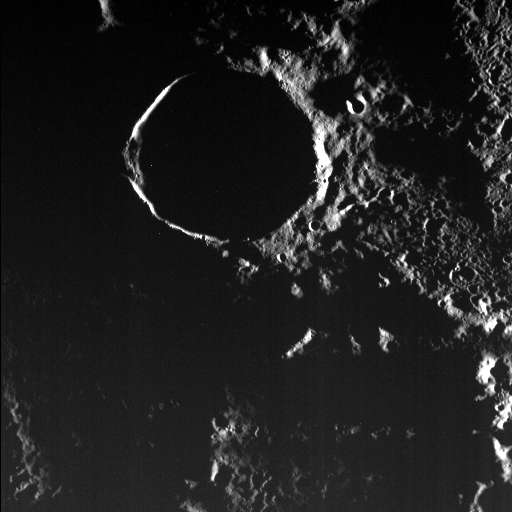
- MESSENGER image
- Planet: Mercury
- Coordinates: 86.09°N 132.79°W
- Quadrangle: Borealis
- Diameter: 27.4 km
- Eponym: Mahananda Sapkota

Sapkota is a crater on Mercury, located near the north pole. It was named by the IAU in 2015, after Nepalese poet Mahananda Sapkota.

S band radar data from the Arecibo Observatory collected between 1999 and 2005 indicates a lack of a radar-bright area within the interior of Sapkota, despite the fact that the floor of the crater is in permanent shadow. Many nearby craters do have radar-bright areas which likely indicate water ice deposits.
