= Mahananda Sapkota =

Nepalese poet (1896–1977)

- महानन्द सापकोटा
- Born: Yagyanidhi Sapkota; May 10, 1896; Illam, Nepal
- Died: 1977
- Occupations: Social worker, Linguist
- Notable work: Udaya Lahari; Jhyaure Bhajan; Tugna Bhajan; Nepali Nirbachan ko Ruprekha
- Parents: Ramchandra Sapkota (father); Saraswoti Sapkota (mother)
- Awards: Madan Puraskar

Mahananda Sapkota (1896–1977) was a Nepalese social worker, etymologist, linguist, and poet. He received several national awards for his contributions to poetry. His social work focused on education and social awareness particularly in eastern Nepal. A statue of him stands in Inaruwa of Sunsari District.

His original name was Yagyanidhi Sapkota and his name was registered as Mahananda when he enrolled in a school in Tezpur in Assam, India. As his mother moved to Tezpur in Assam, she took him along with her. He studied till 7th grade in a government school there. From Dharanidhar Koirala he learnt about Nepali literature and was inspired to write poems.

When Mahananda Sapkota returned to Nepal. He established schools in many places and persuaded people to educate their children.

He received Madan Puraskar for his book Nepali Nirbachan ko Ruprekha.

== Places named after him ==
- Guru Kul Marga, Biratnagar
- Mahananda crossroad, Inaruwa
- Mahananda Intersection, Dhulabari
- Mahnanda Park, Ilam
- Sapkota (crater)

== Major publications ==
1. Aante (I venture)
2. Annu, Asha, Ashu (Annu, hope and tears)
3. Aahuti (offering)
4. Apungo (a sacred edible powder made of wheat, sugar offered in religious ceremony)
5. Bishal Nepal (Great Nepal)
6. Sukha ko bato yasto (the road to happiness)
7. Mana Lahari (The song of heart)
8. Nepali Nirbachan ko Ruprekha.

== See also ==
- List of Nepalese poets
- Bhanubhakta Acharya
- Indra Bahadur Rai
