= Nepal Taekwondo Association =

Korean martial art in Nepal

- नेपाल तेक्वान्दो संघ (एन.टि.ए)
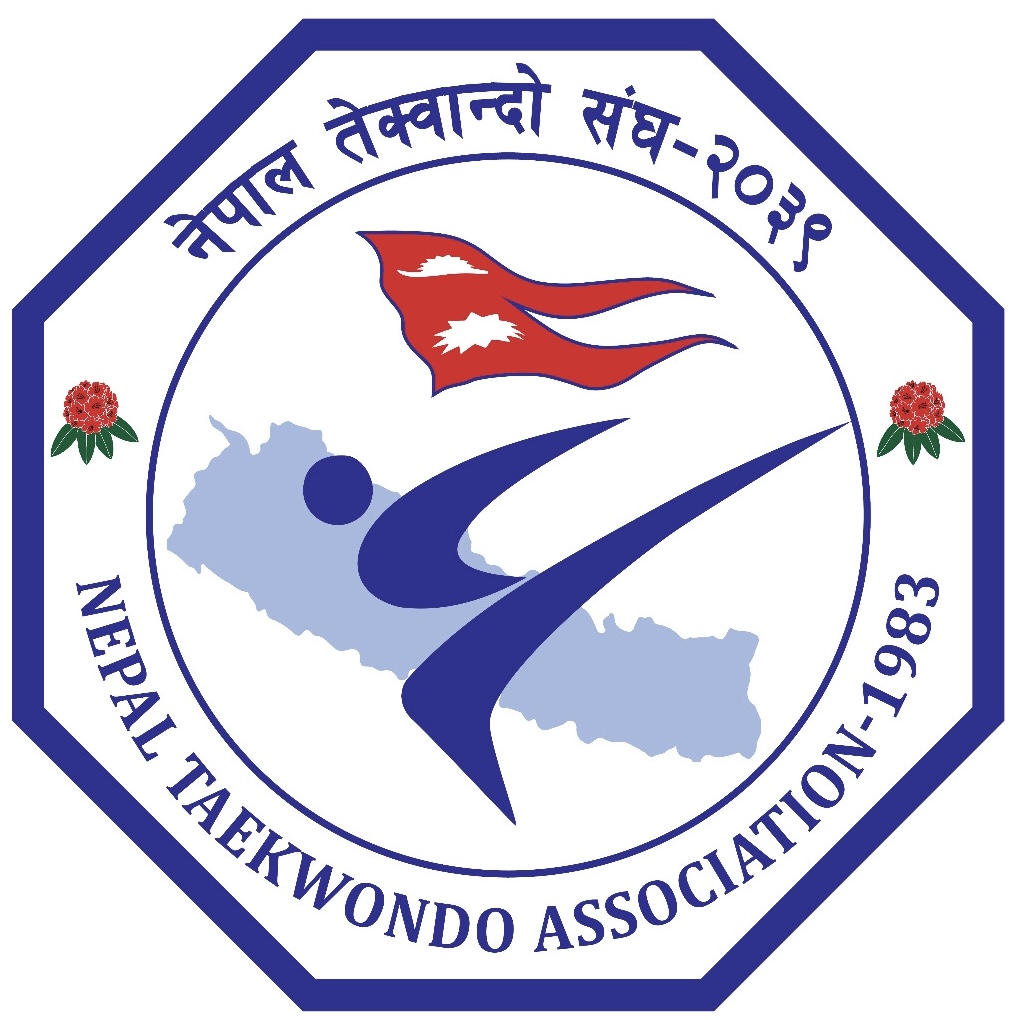
- Purpose: Taekwondo and Para Taekwondo
- Headquarters: Lalitpur Nepal, Satdobatol
- Location: International Sports Complex, Satdobato Lalitpur, Nepal
- Region served: Nepal wide
- Members: 1983 in World Taekwondo, and NSC
- Official language: Nepali and English
- President: Deep Raj Gurung
- Secretary general: Hemant Dangi
- Website: taekwondonepal.org.np

The Nepal Taekwondo Association (NTA) (Nepali: नेपाल तेक्वान्दो संघ (एन.टि.ए) is the governing body for Taekwondo and Para Taekwondo in Nepal. NTA organizes national and international competitions, enabling Nepali taekwondo athletes to participate in international events. Additionally, the Nepal Taekwondo Association promotes the development and expansion of Taekwondo in schools and dojangs across districts within Nepal's provinces. The current President of NTA is Deep Raj Gurung, and its headquarter is located in the International Sports Complex in Lalitpur, Nepal.

Since the establishment of the National Sports Council (Nepal) in 1959, Nepalese athletes made their Olympic Games debut at the 1964 Summer Olympics and their Paralympic Games debut at the 2004 Summer Paralympics. However, Nepal had never secured an official medal in either event—until Palesha Goverdhan, an athlete from the Nepal Taekwondo Association (NTA), made history by winning a bronze medal at the Paris 2024 Paralympic Games. This historic achievement marked Nepal's first-ever official medal in the Olympic Games or Paralympic Games, placing the country on the Paralympic medal tally for the very first time. For this historic and remarkable achievement, Palesha Goverdhan was awarded रू65 lakh (US$43,000) by the Nepalese prime minister KP Oli on behalf of the Government of Nepal on 13 September 2024.

== Nepali Taekwondo History ==
In 1983, Nepal Taekwondo was officially recognized as a discipline under the leadership of the late Sharad Chandra Shah, who served as the member secretary of the National Sports Council (Nepal). This decision was made in collaboration with two Martial Arts Associations. Prior to this, Grand Master Deep Raj Gurung, the founder of Taekwondo and current President of the Nepal Taekwondo Association, initiated the public demonstration of Taekwondo for the first time in Nepal. He subsequently provided training to a group, at a time when martial arts were not widely accessible in the country.

Initially, Nepali citizens were restricted from practicing or training in Taekwondo. However, after the successful demonstration by Grand Master Deep Raj Gurung, the benefits of Taekwondo training became apparent. As a result, Taekwondo was introduced to the disciplinary forces such as the Nepal Police and Nepal Army. Eventually, it was embraced as a martial art open to all Nepalese citizens.

In 1983, the Nepal Taekwondo Association was formally registered with both the National Sports Council (Nepal) and World Taekwondo (W.T).

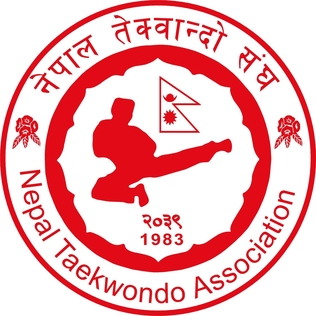
Old logo of the Nepal Taekwondo Association (NTA) from 1983 to May 2024.

== Nepal Taekwondo at the Summer Olympics ==
| S.N | Events | Player's Name | Remarks |
|---|---|---|---|
| 1. | 1988 Summer Olympics | Bidhan Lama | Bronze Medal |
| 2. | 1988 Summer Olympics | Manbahadur Tamang | Participated |
| 3. | 1992 Summer Olympics | Narayan Gurung, Sita Rai and Pramila Thapa | Participated |
| 4. | 2004 Summer Olympics | Sangina Baidya | Participated |
| 5. | 2008 Summer Olympics | Deepak Bista | Participated |
| 6. | 2016 Summer Olympics | Nisha Rawal (taekwondo) | Participated |

== Nepal Parataekwondo at the Summer Paralympics ==
| S.N | Events | Player's Name | Remarks |
|---|---|---|---|
| 1. | 2020 Summer Paralympics | Palesha Goverdhan | Won Repechage match against United States and Serbia athletes (5th Position) |
| 2. | 2024 Summer Paralympics | Palesha Goverdhan | Bronze Medal |
| 3. | 2024 Summer Paralympics | Bharat Singh Mahata | Participated |

== Nepal Taekwondo achievements ==
In Olympic Games, World Taekwondo Championships, Asian Games and Asian Taekwondo Championships.

| S.N | Events | Player's Name | Remarks |
|---|---|---|---|
| 1. | 1988 Summer Olympics | Bidhan Lama | Bronze Medal |
| 2. | 1987 World Taekwondo Championships | Bidhan Lama | Bronze Medal |
| 3. | 1989 World Taekwondo Championships | Sita Kumari Rai (taekwondo) | Bronze Medal |
| 4. | 1986 Asian Games | Bidhan Lama, Raj Kumar Rai, Ram Bahadur Ghachhe and Raj Kumar Buchhe | 4 Bronze Medals |
| 5. | 1994 Asian Games | Man Bahadur Shahi | Bronze Medal |
| 6. | 1998 Asian Games | Sabita Rajbhandari, Sapana Malla and Kishor Shrestha | 1 Silver Medal and 2 Bronze Medals |
| 7. | 2002 Asian Games | Renuka Magar, Ritu Jimee Rai and Deepak Bista | 3 Bronze Medals |
| 8. | 2006 Asian Games | Deepak Bista, Manita Shahi and Ayasha Shakya | 3 Bronze Medals |
| 9. | 1986 Asian Taekwondo Championships | Mohan Kumar Rai | Bronze Medal |
| 10. | 1988 Asian Taekwondo Championships | Bidhan Lama, Sima Khadka, Sita Kumari Rai (taekwondo), Rita Shrestha, Mira Thapa, Laxmi Gurung and Manju Tuladhar | 1 Silver Medal and 6 Bronze Medals |
| 11. | 1990 Asian Taekwondo Championships | Narayan Gurung and Sita Kumari Rai (taekwondo) | 2 Bronze Medals |
| 12. | 1992 Asian Taekwondo Championships | Sita Kumari Rai (taekwondo) | Bronze Medal |
| 13. | 1994 Asian Taekwondo Championships | Sangina Baidya | Silver Medal |
| 14. | 1996 Asian Taekwondo Championships | Sangina Baidya | Gold Medal |
| 15. | 2000 Asian Taekwondo Championships | Sangina Baidya and Renuka Magar | 2 Bronze Medals |
| 16. | 2004 Asian Taekwondo Championships | Renuka Magar | Silver Medal |

== Nepal ParaTaekwondo achievements ==
In Paralympic Games, World Para Taekwondo Championships, Asian Para Games and Asian Para Taekwondo Championships.

| S.N | Events | Player's Name | Remarks |
|---|---|---|---|
| 1. | 2013 World Para Taekwondo Championships, Switzerland | Yadav Kunwar | Bronze Medal |
| 2. | 2014 World Para Taekwondo Championships, Russia | Yadav Kunwar | Silver Medal |
| 3. | 2015 Asian Para Taekwondo Championships, Taiwan | Arun Shakya | Bronze Medal |
| 4. | 2016 Asian Para Taekwondo Championships, Philippines | Ranjana Dhami, Sita Bhandari and Rohit Hang Rai | 1 Silver Medal and 2 Bronze Medals |
| 5. | 2016 European Para Taekwondo Championships, Poland | Sita Bhandari | Bronze Medal |
| 6. | 2017 Asian Para Taekwondo Championships, South Korea | Ranjana Dhami | Bronze Medal |
| 7. | 2017 World Para Taekwondo Championships, United Kingdom | Ranjana Dhami | Bronze Medal |
| 8. | 2018 Asian Para Taekwondo Championships, Vietnam | Palesha Goverdhan | Bronze Medal |
| 9. | 2019 World Para Taekwondo Championships, Turkey | Bikram Shrestha -Poomsae | Bronze Medal |
| 10. | 2021 Asian Youth Para Games, Bahrain | Palesha Goverdhan, Shrijana Ghising, and Bishal Garbuja | Gold Medal, Silver Medal and Bronze Medal |
| 11. | 2022 World Para Taekwondo Grand Prix, Saudi Arabia | Shrijana Ghising | Gold Medal |
| 12. | 2022 Asian Para Games | Palesha Goverdhan | Bronze Medal |
| 13. | 2024 Summer Paralympics | Palesha Goverdhan | Bronze Medal |
| 14. | 2025 Asian Para Taekwondo Championships, Kuching | Palesha Goverdhan | Bronze Medal |

== Executive Board ==
| Name | Officers and members |
|---|---|
| Deep Raj Gurung | President |
Dil Bahadur Woli
Nandu Kumar Rai
Bhan Bahadur Chand
| Hemant Dangi | General Secretary |
| Kasim Miya | Treasurer |
| Tika Prasad Limbu | Member |
| Shreeman Thapa Magar | Member |
| Rabi Thapa | Member |
| Koshish Khadka | Member |
| Madan K.C | Member |
| Nanda Basyal | Member |
| Guru Prasad Gautam | Member |
| Bijay Kumar Neupane | Member |
| Ram Chandra Shrestha | Member |
| Kumar Lama Ghishing | Member |
| Bablu Siwakoti | Member |
| Suman Parajuli | Member |
| Prem Bhandari | Member |

== Affiliated Province Taekwondo Associations ==
The following district taekwondo associations are affiliated to the Nepal Taekwondo Association.

| Province Association | Province | Affiliate District Association | President |
|---|---|---|---|
| Koshi Province Taekwondo Association | Koshi Province | Bhojpur District Taekwondo Association; Dhankuta District Taekwondo Association; Ilam District Taekwondo Association; Jhapa District Taekwondo Association; Khotang District Taekwondo Association; Morang District Taekwondo Association; Panchthar District Taekwondo Association; Sankhuwasabha District Taekwondo Association; Sunsari District Taekwondo Association; Solukhumbu District Taekwondo Association; Taplejung District Taekwondo Association; Udayapur District Taekwondo Association; Okhaldhunga District Taekwondo Association | |
| Madhesh Province Taekwondo Association | Madhesh Province | Bara District Taekwondo Association; Dhanusha District Taekwondo Association; Mahottari District Taekwondo Association; Parsa District Taekwondo Association; Rautahat District Taekwondo Association; Saptari District Taekwondo Association; Sarlahi District Taekwondo Association; Siraha District Taekwondo Association | |
| Bagmati Province Taekwondo Association | Bagmati Province | Bhaktapur District Taekwondo Association; Chitwan District Taekwondo Association; Dhading District Taekwondo Association; Dolakha District Taekwondo Association; Kathmandu District Taekwondo Association; Kavre District Taekwondo Association; Lalitpur District Taekwondo Association; Makwanpur District Taekwondo Association; Nuwakot District Taekwondo Association; Sindhuli District Taekwondo Association; Sindhupalchowk District Taekwondo Association | |
| Gandaki Province Taekwondo Association | Gandaki Province | Baglung District Taekwondo Association; Gorkha District Taekwondo Association; Kaski District Taekwondo Association; Lamjung District Taekwondo Association; Manang District Taekwondo Association; Palpa District Taekwondo Association; Syangja District Taekwondo Association; Tanahu District Taekwondo Association; Nawalparasi District Taekwondo Association; Nawalpur District Taekwondo Association | |
| Lumbini Province Taekwondo Association | Lumbini Province | Banke District Taekwondo Association; Bardiya District Taekwondo Association; Dang District Taekwondo Association; Rupandehi District Taekwondo Association | |
| Karnali Province Taekwondo Association | Karnali Province | Jumla District Taekwondo Association; Surkhet District Taekwondo Association | |
| Sudurpashchim Province Taekwondo Association | Sudurpashchim Province | Kailali District Taekwondo Association; Kanchanpur District Taekwondo Association | |

== Notable people ==
- Deep Raj Gurung is the founding Grandmaster of Nepal Taekwondo
- Palesha Goverdhan is a Nepali para taekwondo practitioner. She competed at the 2020 Summer Paralympics and 2024 Summer Paralympics and won a bronze medal, becoming the first Nepalese athlete to win a medal at the Paralympics.
- Bidhan Lama - He won bronze medals at the 1986 Asian Games, 1987 World Taekwondo Championships and at the 1988 Summer Olympics
- Manbahadur Tamang (1958 – 24 February 2001) was a Nepalese taekwondo practitioner. He competed in the men's featherweight at the 1988 Summer Olympics
- Narayan Gurung was a Nepalese taekwondo practitioner. He competed at the 1992 Summer Olympics
- Sita Kumari Rai (taekwondo) was a Nepalese taekwondo practitioner. She competed at the 1992 Summer Olympics
- Pramila Thapa was a Nepalese taekwondo practitioner. She competed at the 1992 Summer Olympics
- Sangina Baidya was a Nepalese taekwondo practitioner. She competed at the 2004 Summer Olympics
- Deepak Bista was a Nepalese taekwondo practitioner. He competed at the 2008 Summer Olympics
- Nisha Rawal (taekwondo) was a Nepalese taekwondo practitioner. She competed at the 2016 Summer Olympics
- Raj Kumar Rai was a Nepalese taekwondo practitioner.
- Ram Bahadur Ghachhe was a Nepalese taekwondo practitioner.
- Raj Kumar Buchhe was a Nepalese taekwondo practitioner.
- Man Bahadur Shahi was a Nepalese taekwondo practitioner.
- Sabita Rajbhandari was a Nepalese taekwondo practitioner.
- Sapana Malla was a Nepalese taekwondo practitioner.
- Kishor Shrestha was a Nepalese taekwondo practitioner.
- Renuka Magar was a Nepalese taekwondo practitioner.
- Ritu Jimee Rai was a Nepalese taekwondo practitioner.
- Manita Shahi was a Nepalese taekwondo practitioner.
- Ayasha Shakya was a Nepalese taekwondo practitioner.
- Mohan Kumar Rai was a Nepalese taekwondo practitioner.
- Sima Khadka was a Nepalese taekwondo practitioner.
- Rita Shrestha was a Nepalese taekwondo practitioner.
- Mira Thapa was a Nepalese taekwondo practitioner.
- Laxmi Gurung was a Nepalese taekwondo practitioner.
- Manju Tuladhar was a Nepalese taekwondo practitioner.
- Yadav Kunwar was a Nepalese para taekwondo practitioner.
- Arun Shakya was a Nepalese para taekwondo practitioner.
- Ranjana Dhami was a Nepalese para taekwondo practitioner.
- Sita Bhandari was a Nepalese para taekwondo practitioner.
- Rohit Hang Rai was a Nepalese para taekwondo practitioner.
- Bikram Shrestha is a Nepalese para taekwondo practitioner.
- Shrijana Ghising was a Nepalese para taekwondo practitioner.
- Bishal Garbuja was a Nepalese para taekwondo practitioner.
- Kabiraj Negi Lama is a notable figure in Nepalese Para Taekwondo and a successful coach who has made significant contributions to the sport in Nepal.
- Ashmita Khadka was a Nepalese taekwondo practitioner.
- Bharat Singh Mahata is a Nepali para taekwondo practitioner. He competed at the 2024 Summer Paralympics.
