= Kabiraj Negi Lama =

Nepalese taekwondo athlete and coach (born 1989)

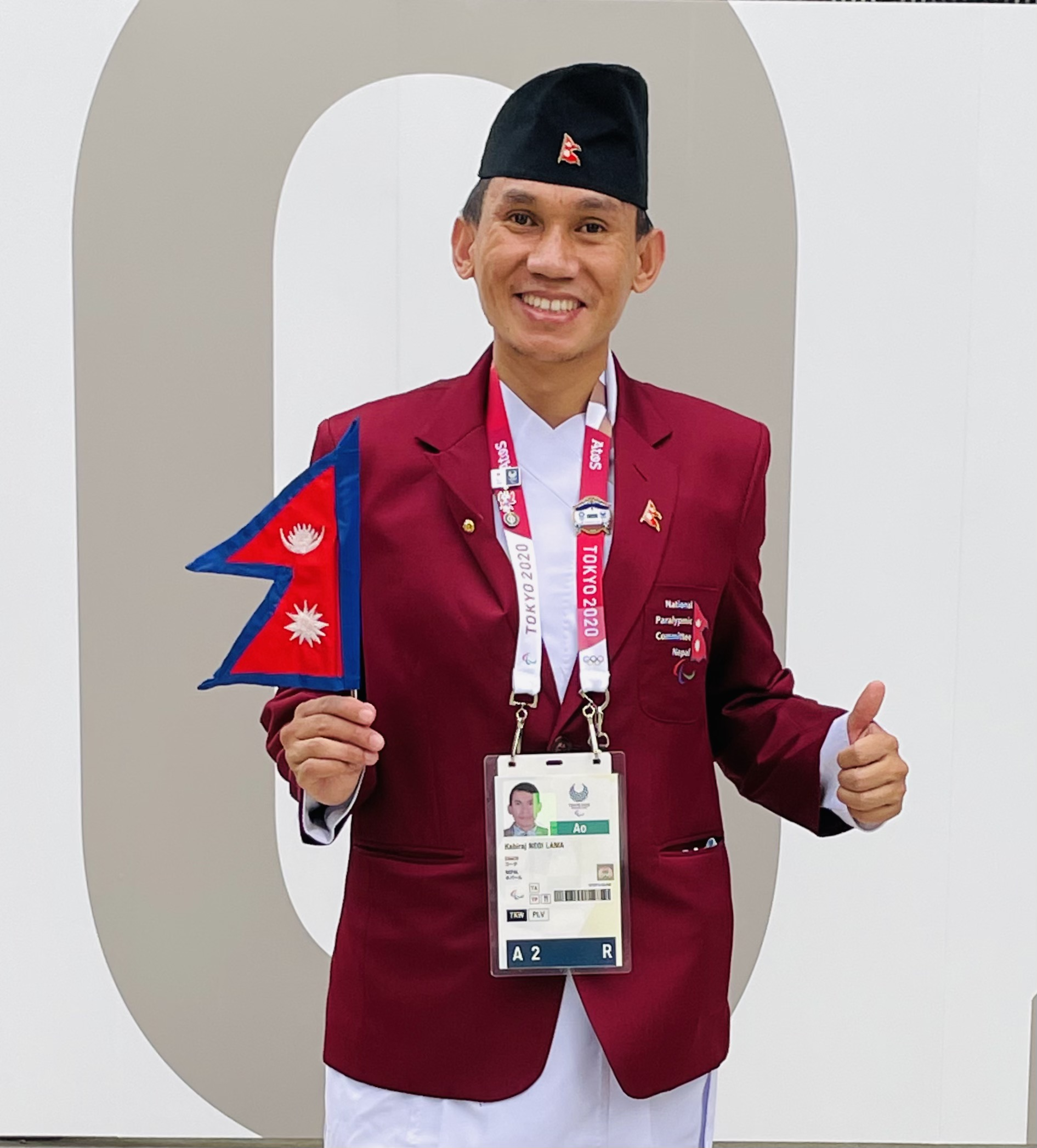

Personal information
- Full name: Kabiraj Negi Lama (Nepali: कविराज नेगी लामा)
- Nickname: Cobs Negi Lama
- Nationality: Nepalese
- Born: 20 September 1989 (age 37) Makawanpur, Nepal
- Height: 1.58 m (5 ft 2 in)
- Weight: 58 kg (128 lb)
- Spouse: Sunita Lama
- Website: kabirajnegilama.com.np

Sport
- Sport: Taekwondo
Medal record
9th Jeju International Sports for All Taekwondo Championships
Gold medal – first place	2009 South Korea	Poomsae

Kabiraj Negi Lama (Nepali: कविराज नेगी लामा) is a Nepali Para Taekwondo head coach. During his tenure, Nepalese Para Taekwondo athletes have won 14 official international medals for Nepal, comprising 3 gold, 2 silver, and 9 bronze medals. He was the first individual from Nepal to receive the Para Taekwondo Coach of the Year Award at the 2025 World Taekwondo Gala Awards, held on 2 February 2026 in Fujairah, United Arab Emirates. The event was organized by World Taekwondo.

He is a former Nepali Taekwondo player, and has participated in various national and international Taekwondo competitions. Additionally, Negi Lama served as the Head Coach of Nepal's Para Taekwondo team at both the Tokyo 2020 Paralympic Games and the Paris 2024 Paralympic Games. He is also the grandson of former minister Tilak Bahadur Negi Lama.

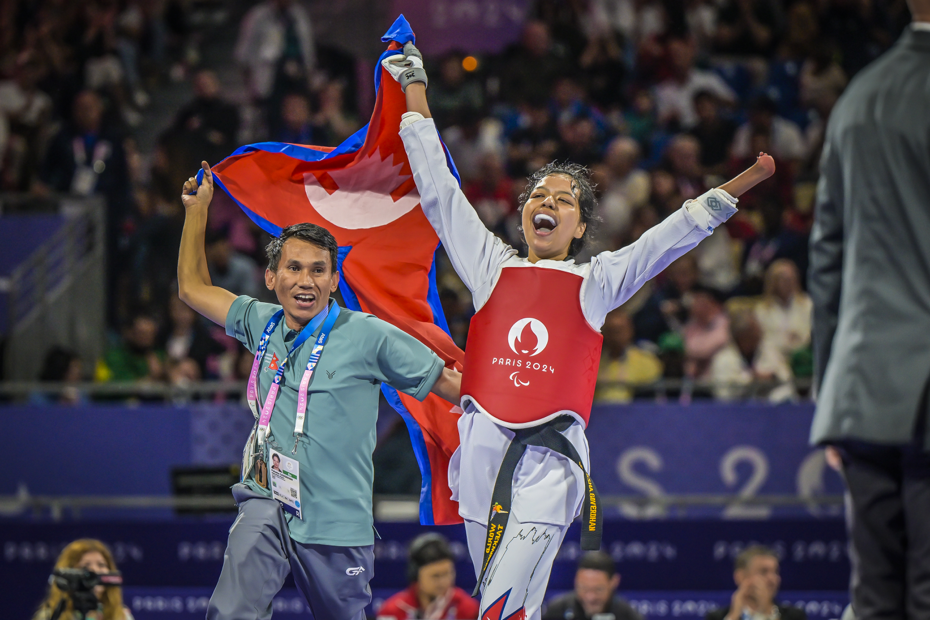
Palesha Goverdhan celebrates winning a major medal for Nepal at the Paris 2024 Paralympic Games, alongside her coach Kabiraj Negi Lama, hoisting the Nepalese flag at the Grand Palais in Paris.

== Career as an athlete ==
He won the gold medal in the 9th Jeju International Sports for All Taekwondo Championships, Poomsae category, in 2009 in South Korea.

== Coaching career ==
He has held a 6th Dan Black belt from Kukkiwon South Korea and the Nepal Taekwondo Association (NTA) since 2023.

He is an International Para Taekwondo Coach, having acquired the International Coach Certificate and Para Taekwondo Level-II License, conducted by World Para Taekwondo in December 2020.

He has been the Team Coach of the National Para Taekwondo Team, Nepal Taekwondo Association, since 2015.

=== 2016 ===
He was the Team Coach at the 20th Asian Cities Taekwondo Championship held in Hong Kong, China, in 2016. Later that same year, he participated in the Para Taekwondo Course in Muju, South Korea.

=== 2017 ===
He was the Team Coach at the 3rd 2017 Asian Para Taekwondo Championships in Choenchoun, South Korea, where para athlete Ranjana Dhami won a bronze medal in the Kyorugi (K-44) category.

=== 2018 ===
His team participated in the Gold Coast Open Taekwondo Championship held in Australia, where he represented the team as the Team Manager.

=== 2019 ===
He participated as the team coach at the 8th 2019 World Para Taekwondo Championships, where athlete Bikram Shrestha won a bronze medal in Antalya, Turkey.

Later, he participated in the Para Taekwondo Training Camp organized in Miki City, Japan.

=== 2021 ===
His athlete Palesha Goverdhan won a gold medal, while Shrijana Ghising and Bishal Garbuja each won a silver and a bronze at the 2021 Asian Youth Para Games. He led the para team as the coach to achieve these historical medals in 2021 Asian Youth Para Games.

He also coached Nepal at the 2020 Summer Paralympics Games, where his athlete Palesha Goverdhan won repechage matches against athletes from the United States and Serbia in the Tokyo 2020 Summer Paralympics Games.

=== 2022 ===
Lama participated as a team coach in the Para 4th WT President's Cup Asian Region Taekwondo Championships on 14 March 2022 in Tehran, Iran, where his player Shrijana Ghising won a silver medal for Nepal.

He also participated as a team coach in the Sharjah Qualification Tournament for the Hangzhou 2022 Asian Para Games in Sharjah, UAE on 24–27 May 2022, where his athlete Ranjana Dhami won a bronze medal for Nepal.

As the Team Coach of the Riyadh 2022 World Para Taekwondo Grand Prix Final held in Riyadh, Saudi Arabia, his athlete Shrijana Ghising won the first historical gold medal for Nepal in the World Taekwondo Grand Prix-Final after defeating top-ranked athletes from Mexico, Brazil, and Turkey.

=== 2023 ===
Negi Lama participated as a team coach in the 2022 Asian Para Games held in Hangzhou, China, from 22 to 28 October 2023. During this time, his player Palesha Goverdhan won a bronze medal, becoming the first Nepalese para athlete to win a medal in the Asian Para Games.

=== 2024 ===
Negi Lama led as a coach in the Asian Qualification Tournament for the Paris 2024 Paralympic Games held in Tai'an, China, from 15 to 17 March 2024. His player Palesha Goverdhan won a gold medal, making history as the first Nepali Paralympian to qualify for the 2024 Summer Paralympics Games.

Negi Lama also participated in the 2024 Asian Para Taekwondo Championships held in Da Nang, Vietnam, on 19 May 2024, as a team coach.

Under the coaching of Kabiraj Negi Lama, Palesha Goverdhan won a bronze medal for Nepal at the Paris 2024 Paralympic Games. It was Nepal's first official medal at either the Olympic Games or Paralympic Games. The achievement was widely reported by Nepalese media as a significant milestone in the country's sporting history. On 13 September 2024, the Government of Nepal awarded Goverdhan NPR 6.5 million (approximately USD 48,000) and Lama NPR 585,000 in recognition of their achievements. The awards were presented by Prime Minister KP Sharma Oli.

Lama also coached Bharat Singh Mahata, who competed at the Paris 2024 Paralympic Games.

=== 2025 ===
Under the coaching of Kabiraj Negi Lama, athlete Palesha Goverdhan won a bronze medal for Nepal at the 10th Asian Para Taekwondo Championship held in Kuching, Malaysia, on 1 July 2025.

Similarly, under his coaching, Renu Tamang won a bronze medal for Nepal at the 2025 Asian Youth Para Games, held in Dubai, United Arab Emirates, from December 7 to 14, 2025.

=== 2026 ===
Negi Lama served as the head coach of Nepal's national para taekwondo team at the 11th Asian Para Taekwondo Championships, held in Ulaanbaatar, Mongolia, on 25 May 2026. During the championships, Nepali athlete Palesha Goverdhan won a bronze medal for Nepal.

Lama also served as a team coach for Nepal at the 2026 Asian Para Games, held in Aichi–Nagoya, Japan, from 18 to 24 October 2026.

== Awards and nominations ==
Lama was nominated as the best coach of the year in the NSJF Pulsar Sports Awards 2078, by Nepal Sports Journalists Forum (NSJF) held on 7 March 2023.

Lama has been awarded NOC Best Coach Male 2022 by Nepal Olympic Committee (NOC Award 2022) on 23 June 2023. Appreciating his contribution to the development of Para Taekwondo in Nepal, he has been honored with NOC Award Best Coach Male 2022.

Lama has been awarded Best Taekwondo Coach Award 2024 by Nepal Taekwondo Association held on 20 April 2024 in Sauraha Chitwan. He was honored by Minister of Youth and Sports Honorable Minister Biraj Bhakta Shrestha and President of Nepal Taekwondo Association Prakash Shamsher Rana.

Lama was nominated as the best coach of the year in theNSJF Pulsar Sports Awards 2080, by Nepal Sports Journalists Forum (NSJF) held on 13 September 2024.

Lama was honored with the Best Coach Award at the Bagmati Province Sports Awards 2082, organized by the Ministry of Youth and Sports Bagmati Province. The award ceremony was held on 18 May 2025 in Hetauda, Makawanpur.

Lama was awarded Coach of the Year at the NSJF Pulsar Sports Award 2081 by the Nepal Sports Journalists Forum (NSJF), held on 7 January 2026 in Pokhara.

Lama was the first person from Nepal to receive the Para Taekwondo Coach of the Year Award at the 2025 World Taekwondo Gala Awards, held on 2 February 2026 in Fujairah, United Arab Emirates. The event was organized by World Taekwondo (WT).

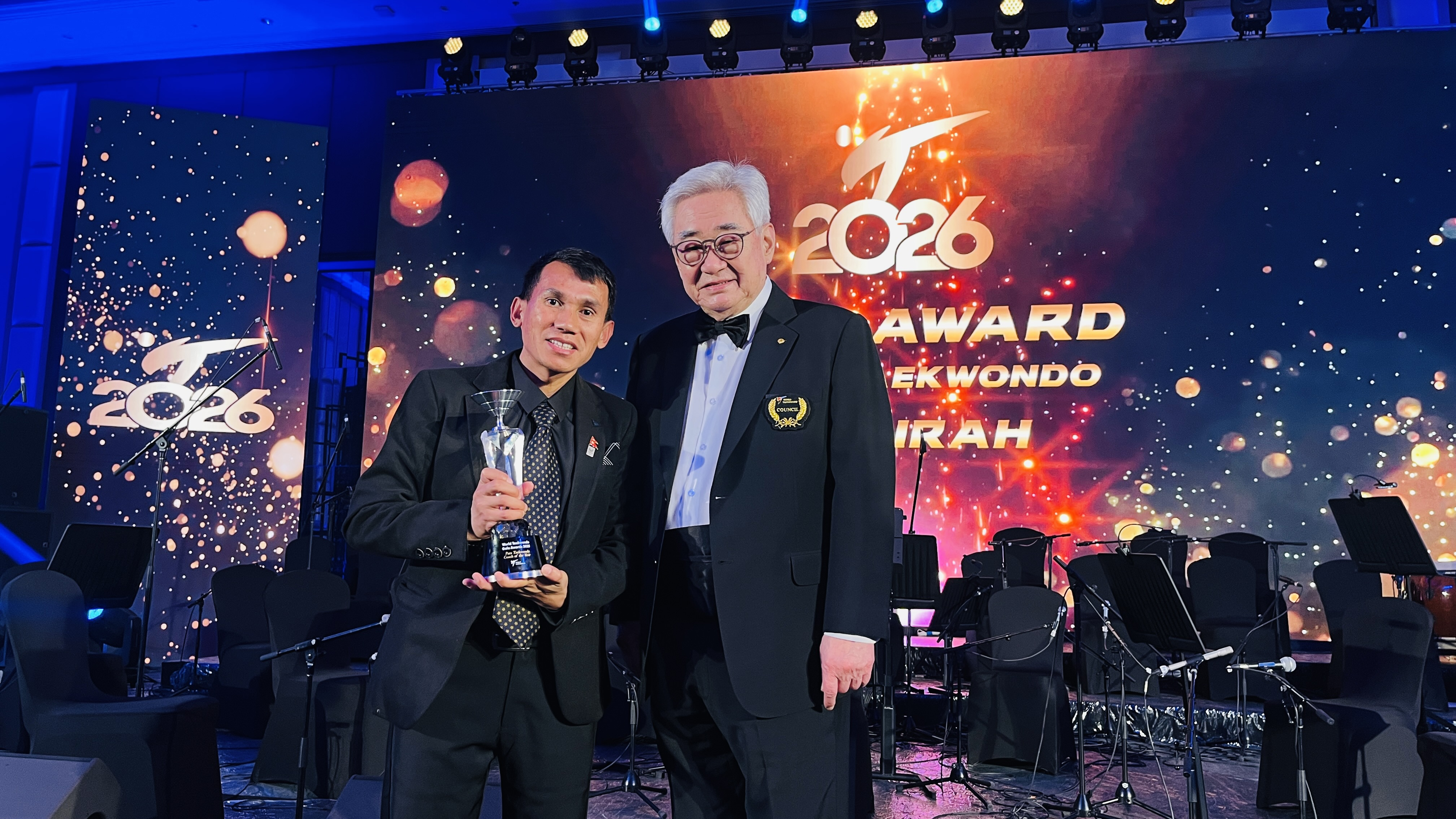
Kabiraj Negi Lama with Dr. Choue Chung-won, president of World Taekwondo, after receiving the Para Taekwondo Coach of the Year Award at the 2025 World Taekwondo Gala Awards

== Achievements as Para Taekwondo coach ==
S.N	Events	Date/venue	Remarks
1.	3rd Asian Para Taekwondo Championships	1 July 2017, Chuncheon, South Korea	Bronze medal
2.	8th World Para Taekwondo Championships	5, 6 February 2019, Antalya, Turkey	Bronze medal
3.	Tokyo 2020 Summer Paralympics Games	24 August-5 September 2021, Tokyo, Japan	Palesha Goverdhan had Won Repechage match against USA and Serbia athletes
4.	2021 Asian Youth Para Games	2–6 December 2021, Manama, Bahrain	1 Gold, 1 Silver, 1 Bronze medal
5.	Para 4th WT President's Cup	14 March 2022, Tehran, Iran	Silver medal
6.	Sharjah Qualification Tournament for Hangzhou 2022 Asian Para Games	24–27 May 2022, Sharjah, United Arab Emirates	Bronze medal
7.	Riyadh 2022 World Para Taekwondo Grand Prix Final G10	8–10 December 2022, Saudi Arabia, Riyadh	Gold medal
8.	Hangzhou 2022 Asian Para Games	22–28 October 2023, Hangzhou, China	Bronze medal
9.	Asian Qualification Tournament For Paris 2024 Paralympic Games (2024 Asian Taekwondo Paralympic Qualification Tournament)	15–17 March 2024, Tai'an, China	Gold medal, qualified
10.	Paris 2024 Summer Paralympics	28 August to 8 September 2024, Paris, France	Bronze medal
11.	10th Asian Para Taekwondo Championships	1 July 2025, Kuching, Malaysia	Bronze medal
12.	Dubai 2025 Asian Youth Para Games	7 to 14 December 2025, Dubai, United Arab Emirates	Bronze medal
13.	11th Asian Para Taekwondo Championships	25 May 2026, Ulaanbaatar, Mongolia	Bronze medal
