= Shrijana Ghising =

Nepalese parataekwondo practitioner (born 1999)

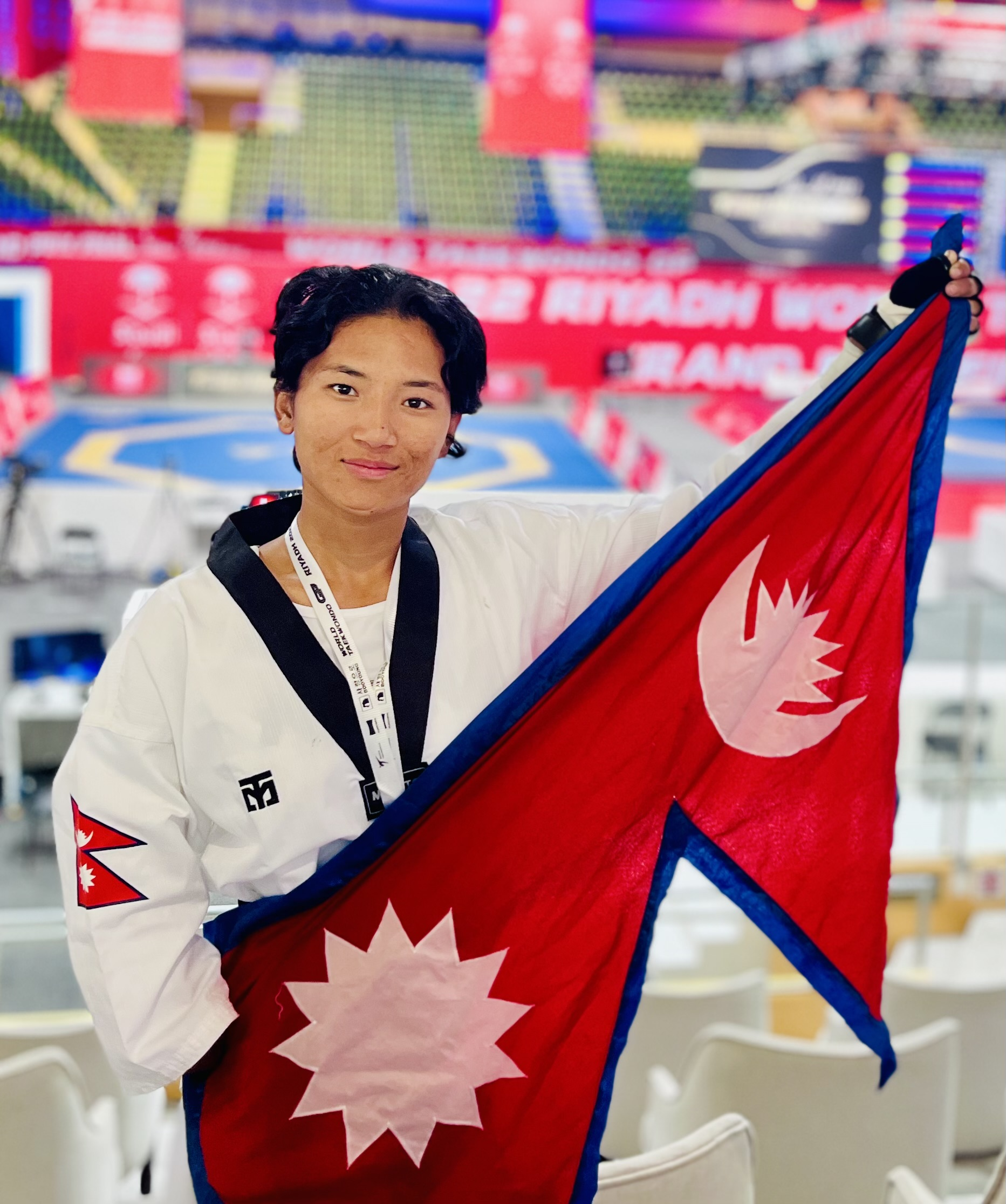

Personal information
- Full name: Shrijana Ghising (सृजना घिसिङ)
- Nationality: Nepalese
- Born: 5 December 1999 (age 26) Makawanpur, Nepal
- Height: 1.6 m (5 ft 3 in)
- Parents: Amrit Bahadur Ghising (father); Suntali Maya Ghising (mother)

Sport
- Country: Nepal
- Sport: Para Taekwondo
- Disability class: K44
- Coached by: Kabiraj Negi Lama
Medal record
Women's Para Taekwondo
Representing Nepal
World Para Taekwondo Grand Prix Final
Gold medal – first place	2022 Riyadh Saudi Arabia	-52 kg
WT President's Cup Asian Region Taekwondo Championships
Silver medal – second place	2022 Tehran, Iran	-52 kg
2021 Asian Youth Para Games
Silver medal – second place	2021 Bahrain	-52 kg

Shrijana Ghising (सृजना घिसिङ) (born 5 December 1999 in Makawanpur) is a Nepalese Para Taekwondo practitioner. She trained from 2019 to July 2023 at the Nepal Taekwondo Association with Nepal National Para Taekwondo coach Kabiraj Negi Lama.

== Career ==
Ghising won the first historical gold medal for Nepal in the Riyadh 2022 World Para Taekwondo Grand Prix-Final (G-10) in Riyadh, Saudi Arabia on 8 to 10 December 2022. She defeated the top three athletes in the world ranking: Mexican player Jessica García Quijano, Brazilian player Cristhiane Nascimento, and Turkish player Meryem Betül Çavdar.

She also won a silver medal for Nepal in the 2021 Asian Youth Para Games.

Ghising won a silver medal for Nepal in the Para 4th WT President's Cup Asian Region Taekwondo Championships on 14 March 2022 in Tehran, Iran.
