= Manbahadur Tamang =

Nepalese taekwondo practitioner

Personal information
- Nationality: Nepalese
- Born: 1958
- Died: 24 February 2001 (aged 42–43); Nuwakot District, Nepal

Sport
- Sport: Taekwondo
- Event: Men's featherweight

Manbahadur Tamang (1958 – 24 February 2001) was a Nepalese taekwondo practitioner. He competed in the men's featherweight at the 1988 Summer Olympics. Tamang was played taekwondo for a long time as an athlete in the Nepal Taekwondo Association. He was murdered by Maoists in 2001.
