= Nepal at the 2020 Summer Paralympics =

- IPC code: NEP
- NPC: National Para Sports Association – Nepal

in Tokyo
- Competitors: 1 in 1 sport
- Medals: Gold 0 Silver 0 Bronze 0 Total 0

Summer Paralympics appearances (overview)
- 2004; 2008; 2012; 2016; 2020; 2024

Nepal competed at the 2020 Summer Paralympics in Tokyo, Japan, originally scheduled to take place in 2020 but postponed to 23 July to 8 August 2021 because of the COVID-19 pandemic.

== Taekwondo ==
One athlete from Nepal qaualified to compete at the Paralympics. Palesha Goverdhan qualified under the bipartite commission invitation allocation quota.

Athlete	Event	First round	Quarterfinals	Semifinals	Repechage 1	Repechage 2	Final/BM	
Athlete	Event	Opposition Result	Opposition Result	Opposition Result	Opposition Result	Opposition Result	Rank	
Palesha Goverdhan	Women's 58 kg	Munro (GBR) L 8-21	did not advance		Salinaro (USA) W 10-0	Mičev (SRB) W 23-15	Yujie (CHN) L 0-12	5

== See also ==
- Nepal at the 2020 Summer Olympics
