= Nepal Karate Federation =

National governing body for karate in Nepal

- Sport: Karate
- Jurisdiction: (Nepal) National
- Abbreviation: NKF
- Founded: 1989
- Affiliation: World Karate Federation
- Regional affiliation: Asian Karate Federation
- Headquarters: National sports center, Satdobato, Lalitpur, Nepal
- Chairman: Mr. Yubraj Lama
- Secretary: Dhawa Gurung

Official website
- nepalkaratefederation.org.np
- (Nepal)

The Nepal Karate Federation (NKF) serves as the national governing body for Karate in Nepal. It was established in 1989 with the aim of promoting, developing, and organizing the sport of karate throughout the country.

Nepal Karate Federation holds the current championship trophy of South Asian Karate Championship organized by South Asian Karate Federation.

== Karate styles ==
Under Nepal Karate Federation there are different forms of Karate Associations to regulate & conduct activates related to their form of Karate:

Styles	National Federation	Affiliated National Association
Ashihara kaikan		Nepal Ashihara Kaikan Karate Do Association
Bōgutsuki Karate		Nepal Renbukai Karate Association
Gōjū-ryū	Nepal Goju-Ryu Karate Federation	Japan Goju-Ryu Kenwakai Karate Do Nepal Association
Gōjū-ryū	Nepal Goju-Ryu Karate Federation	JKF Renbukai Karate Do Association Nepal
Gōjū-ryū	Nepal Goju-Ryu Karate Federation	Japan Karate Do Goju-Ryu Osikai Association Nepal
Gōjū-ryū	Nepal Goju-Ryu Karate Federation	Nepal Goju-Ryu
Kyokushin	Nepal International Federation Of Kyokushinkaikan Karate Association (IFKK NEPAL); Nepal Shinkyokushin Karate Association	
Kyokushin	Nepal International Federation Of Kyokushinkaikan Karate Association (IFKK NEPAL); Nepal Shinkyokushin Karate Association	Nepal Kyokushin Budokai Karate Association
Kyokushin	Nepal International Federation Of Kyokushinkaikan Karate Association (IFKK NEPAL); Nepal Shinkyokushin Karate Association	Nepal Kyokusin Karate Association (IKO)
Kyokushin	Nepal International Federation Of Kyokushinkaikan Karate Association (IFKK NEPAL); Nepal Shinkyokushin Karate Association	Nepal Kyokusin Karate Do Association
Kyokushin	Nepal International Federation Of Kyokushinkaikan Karate Association (IFKK NEPAL); Nepal Shinkyokushin Karate Association	Nepal Kyokusin Kai Kan Karate Association
Kyokushin	Nepal International Federation Of Kyokushinkaikan Karate Association (IFKK NEPAL); Nepal Shinkyokushin Karate Association	*Nepal Kyokushin-Seishin Kaikan Karate Association
Kyokushin	Nepal International Federation Of Kyokushinkaikan Karate Association (IFKK NEPAL); Nepal Shinkyokushin Karate Association	Nepal Machushima Kyokusin Karate Association
Kyokushin	Nepal International Federation Of Kyokushinkaikan Karate Association (IFKK NEPAL); Nepal Shinkyokushin Karate Association	Nepal Strongest Kyokusin Karate Association
Shidōkan Karate		Nepal Shido Karate Association
Shidōkan Karate		Nepal Shidokan Karate Association.
Shitō-ryū	Nepal Shito-Ryo Karate Federation	Nepal Renbo-kai Karate Association
Shitō-ryū	Nepal Shito-Ryo Karate Federation	Nepal Shito-Ryu Karate Association
Shitō-ryū	Nepal Shito-Ryo Karate Federation	Nepal Shito-Ryu Sobukan Karate Association
Shindō jinen-ryū		Nepal Sinjin Karate Association
Shōrin-ryū		Nepal Okinawa Shuriken Surin Ryu Karate Do Association
Shotokan	Nepal Shotokan Karate Federation	
Shotokan	Nepal Shotokan Karate Federation	Nepal Kwan Mukan Karate Association
Shotokan	Nepal Shotokan Karate Federation	Nepal Nihon Shotokan Karate Do Association
Shotokan	Nepal Shotokan Karate Federation	Nepal Shotokan Karate Association (SKIF)
Shotokan	Nepal Shotokan Karate Federation	Shotokan Karate Do Association Nepal
Wadō-ryū	Nepal Wado ryu Karate Federation	
Wadō-ryū	Nepal Wado ryu Karate Federation	Nepal Wado-kai Karate Association
Wadō-ryū	Nepal Wado ryu Karate Federation	Nepal Wado-Ryu Karate Do Association
Wadō-ryū	Nepal Wado ryu Karate Federation	Nepal Wado-Ryu Karate Do Renmei Sondozuk Association

== See also ==
- Kushal Shrestha
- Arika Gurung
