= Muni Sakya =

Nepalese computer programmer

Muni Bahadhur Shakya
- Born: 1942 (age 83–84); Lalitpur, Nepal
- Occupation: Computer Engineer

Muni Bahadhur Shakya or Muni Shakya (Nepali: मुनीबहादुर शाक्य) is a Nepalese computer programmer. He is credited with helping bring information technology to Nepal. He is also known for designing computer systems that can be operated in the Nepali language.

== Biography ==
Shakya was born in 1942, in Patan. His father is Buddharaj Shakya. He had three siblings. His birth name was Muni Shakya but his teacher in school added the Bahadhur as the middle name. He tried to correct the name, but it could not happen and his certificates used the name Muni Bahadhur Shakya.

He joined Tri-Chandra College as a physics student. However, due to their interest in electronics, he opted to study engineering and got a diploma in radio engineering from Calcutta, India in 1962.

After completing the diploma, he returned to Nepal and helped a British engineer to make a 10kW radio transmitter. Observing his skill, he was invited to study in England in 1970 as a British Council scholar.

== Career and contributions ==
Shakya designed and fabricated devices, including a laboratory-type stabilized power supply and a sine wave generator. He went to France in 1973, where he worked until 1979. In France, he decided to switch to computing and made microprocessor-based controllers and video cards while studying communication, digital electronics, and computer techniques there.

In 1979, he made the first microcomputer in Nepal. He built the power supply and video call. He bought a keyboard from the US and made the monitor from Russian television. At the South Asian Regional Conference on computers, held in Kathmandu in 1979, Shakya demonstrated his device.

Shakya went to the US in 1981 to work on the development of floppy disk controllers. As I/O cards were yet to be invented, after he came back from the US, he made I/O cards required for the hard disk. He designed microprocessor-based traffic controllers in Kathmandu. He opened the first Nepalese company for manufacturing computer cards, Sun Moon Computer Industry, in 1995, and established Hi-Tech Pioneer Ltd, an Internet service provider.

=== Devanagari typing ===
Shakya's primary interest is in designing systems, to operate in the Nepali language. Because of the difficulty in programming in the Nepali language, Nepalese software was limited to word processing. He did his first demonstration of computing in the Nepali language on a microcomputer with the display of the Nepalese National Anthem in Devanagari script in 1983 on a CP/M-based computer. He received the Science Award in December 1983 for this work. He developed a software package complete with all Nepali characters. Certificates and checks were printed in the Nepali language using it. Commercial Nepali software can be developed. Shakya is working towards software with Nepali menus and commands so that Nepalese can work with computers without the knowledge of English.

=== Green Computer ===
Shakya collaborated with doctors to provide telemedicine service by developing a low powered computer suitable to be used in area without large electricity facility.

=== Muni's robot ===
Around 2004–2005, Shakya developed the Munis Robot that can speak Nepali with the capability to discern obstacles with the help of built-in ultrasonic, infrared, mechanical whiskers, and other visual and audio capabilities.

=== 16 node supercomputer ===
On May 17, 2006, for the first time in Nepal, Shakya's supercomputer with 16 nodes was demonstrated. This supercomputer worked on open source OS with OpenMosix and Oscar. The supercomputer utilized sixteen computers in a cluster. This computer is on display at High Tech Pioneer Pvt. Ltd, located at Kalikasthan, Dilli Bazar, Nepal.

== Awards and recognition ==
- In 2005, the Royal Nepal Academy of Science & Technology (RONAST) awarded Shakya a cash prize of Rs. 50,000 as an A-class scientist.
- ICT Excellence Award 2012
- ICT Special Award 2016.

== Programs developed by Muni Shakya ==
- Voice Recognition System
- Voice Dictionary
- Computer-aided Education
- Actual Nepali to English, English to Nepali dictionary
- Radiation Monitor
- Nepalese Subtitle Display
- Nepali Multimedia
- Telemedicine
