= Mandil Pradhan =

Nepalese mountain biker

- मन्दिल प्रधान
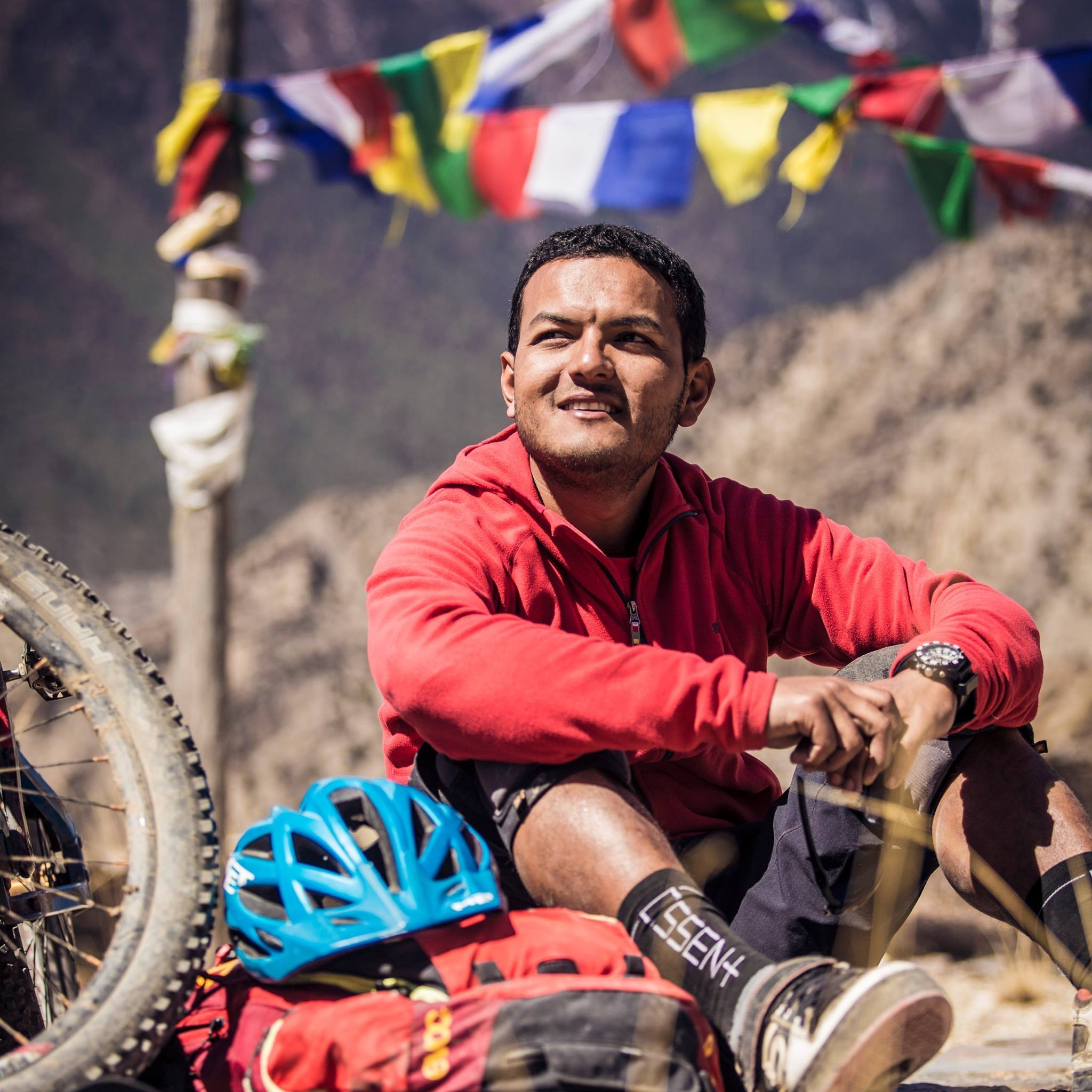
- Mandil Pradhan in Mustang, Nepal
- Born: 10 July 1983 (age 42)
- Years active: 2008 - Present
- Organization: Himalayan Rides
- Known for: Mountain Bike Exploration

Mandil Pradhan (Nepali: मन्दिल प्रधान) is a Nepalese mountain biker, explorer, and mountain guide. He is the owner and head guide of Himalayan Rides, a mountain bike tour company that operates advanced level trips primarily in the Mustang region of Nepal.

== Mountain bike exploration ==
Since 2008, Mandil has explored the Himalayas of Nepal seeking to connect the various trails that traverses the region. He sought to develop biking routes in the mountainous Northern region in order to encourage mountain biking tourism in Nepal. He initially started the exploration as a consultant for other Nepalese tour companies and continued this with the formation of Himalayan Rides in 2010.

In 2010, he spent 10 months in the remote Mustang district searching for cattle paths that had the potential to be used as riding trails. During this period, he discovered various trails that have since become popular amongst mountain bikers who travel to the region.

In April 2011, Mandil along with Australian mountain biker Grant Dansie and Nepalese photographer Gaurav Man Sherchan became the first people to ride downhill from the Kyanjin Valley to Syafru Besi in the Langtang Region of Nepal.

== Tour operation ==
Mandil's tour company Himalayan Rides launched in 2010. The company works on a business-to-business only model focussing solely on ground handling and has partnered with international companies for sales and marketing purposes. The partners include UK-based outfitter H+I Adventures and Canadian tour company Sacred Rides Mountain Bike Holidays.

== Racing career ==
Mandil has participated in several top level mountain bike races including the Megavalanche, Crankworx, Enduro World Series and Big Mountain Enduro. In addition to successful participation in the international races, Mandil won the 2014 Nepalese Open National Mountain Bike Championship held in Chovar, Kathmandu.

== Mountain bike videos ==
Mandil has ridden in three popular mountain bike videos since 2012. The first video was Himalayan High, a video that showcases a blend of culture and adventure in the Mustang Valley. The video gathered worldwide recognition with over 1 million views through various online platforms. It was a finalist at the UK Adventure Film Festival, selected by Red Bull as one of the Awesome Videos of 2012. and featured on Outside Magazine.

The second video Colors of Kathmandu was released in 2013 and was also able to garner attention in the mountain biking media, including a feature on Bike Magazine and popular mountain biking portal Pinkbike.

The third video was called Nepal Through My Eyes and was shot completely on a GoPro point-of-view camera over a period of 3 years. The video was reviewed by The Daily Telegraph and mountain biking website Singletracks.

== Sponsors / partners ==
Mandil is sponsored by Canadian mountain bike company Banshee Bikes, Nepalese mountain gear manufacturer Sherpa Adventure Gear, Italian helmet and protection company Met Bluegrass and Canadian component manufacturer Race Face.

== Other careers ==
Prior to becoming a professional mountain biker, Mandil started an event management company called Party Nepal at just 18 years old. Mandil sold the company to his partners in 2008, aged 25 to pursue a full-time career in mountain biking.
