= Shiba Subedi =

Nepali Song writer

Shiba Subedi शिव सुवेदी
- Born: August 1988 (age 37); Parbat, Nepal
- Origin: Nepal
- Occupation: Lyricist / Song Writer
- Years active: 2004–present

Shiba Subedi (Nepali: शिव सुवेदी ) is a Nepalese lyricist and songwriter born in August 1988 in the Parbat District of Nepal. He is known for his popular song "Gham Jasto Chamkilo Jun Hudaina," which was released in 2009.

== About ==
Songwriter Subedi stated to contribute in music industry from 2004 , where his song "Gham Jasto Chamkilo Jun Hudaina" was released in 2009. He has been written more than 50 songs. He actively involved in Nepali Music industry field for more than 18 years. "Gham Jasto Chamkilo Hudaina", "Bhumari Maa Pare Bhane Ma", "Kina Yasto Hunchha", "Bhulnai Bhayo Dhau", "Dukheko Desh" are some popular song in his music carrier. Subedi is a lifetime member of Geetkar Sangh Nepal, Lyricist Association of Nepal, National Folk and Duet Song Academy and worked as a Board Member at Music Royalty Collection Society of Nepal (MRCSN). He has been awarded from Bindabasini Music Award 2067 BS and Music Khabar Music Award in 2070 BS.

== Award ==
SN	Award Title	Award Category	Notable Work	Result	Ref
1	Rara Music Award -2023	Best Music Composer of the Year	Dukha Tarya Chhaina - Nepali Song	won	
2	Music Khabar Music Award - 2013	Best Lyricist of the Year	Kina Yesto Hunchha - Nepali Song	won	
3	Bindabasini Music Award - 2013	Best Lyricist of the Year	Kina Yesto Hunchha - Nepali Song	won	
4	3rd Lok Dohori Award 2014 AD	Best Lyricist of the Year	Mero Adha Jindagi - Nepali Song	won	
5	Sagarmatha Music Award 2081 BS	Best Lyricist of the Year	Song: Dukha Tarya Chhaina	won	

== Songs ==
SN	Song name	Credit	Release date	Ref
1	Gham Jasto Chamkilo Juna Hudaina	Lyrics & Music	2009	
2	Timi Bina Hasera Hidna	Lyrics & Music	2022	
3	Bhumari Maa Pare Bhane Ma	Lyrics & Music	2009	
4	Bhulnai Bhayo dhau	Lyrics & Music	2010	
5	Gham Jasto Chamkilo 2.0	Lyrics & Music	2023	
6	Enough is Enough	Lyrics & Music	2020	
7	Euta Santan Janmaaideu Aama	Lyrics	2016	
8	Mata Timro Hoina	Lyrics & Music	2024	
9	Abhagi Ta Ma Hu	Lyrics & Music	2021	
10	Bacheko chhu Dhanna	Lyrics & Music	2020	
11	Yatti Janna Man Chha	Lyrics & Music	2015	
12	Kasko Anumati	Lyrics & Music	2021	
13	Afnopan	Music	2021	
14	Lehangaa Lagaauchhu	Lyrics	2024	
15	Narau Hai Aama	Lyrics	2024	
16	Naari Ko Teej	Lyrics	2024	
