= Nepal Wireless Networking Project =

Wireless network organization

Nepal Wireless Networking Project (NWNP) is a social enterprise that provides Internet access, e-commerce, education, telemedicine, environmental and agricultural services as well as job opportunities to a number of remote villages in Nepal, using wireless technologies. The project was created and is led by Mahabir Pun, who received international recognition including the Magsaysay Award for his work in this field.

== Development of the wireless network infrastructure ==
Himanchal High School, founded in 1993, is located in Nangi, a mountain village in western Nepal. In 1996, Mahabir Pun started using the school's Web site to attract volunteers and collect materials for the school. After requesting assistance from the BBC, Pun attracted volunteers and computer equipment donations from around the world. Pun used two small hydro-generators installed in nearby streams to power computers which had been donated by people in Australia, Singapore and Malaysia. In 2002, Wi-Fi-based wireless connectivity was established between Nangi and a neighbouring village, Ramche. After five years, the team succeeded in connecting Nangi to Pokhara, the closest city with Internet access.

Numerous institutions and technology firms provided support for the project, including the Donald Strauss Foundation, the International Center for Applied Studies in Information Technology at George Mason University, the World Bank, the International Telecommunication Union (ITU), Doodle Labs, Pacific Wireless and others. Besides the international support, local institutions including the E-Networking Research and Development, Gandaki College of Engineering and Sciences and Prime College also contributed to the project.

By 2008, forty-two villages in Myagdi, Kaski, Parbat, Makawanpur, Dolakha, Palpa, Bajhang and Khumbu region had acquired Internet access through the project. At that time, nineteen further villages in Rasuwa, Nuwakot, Gorakha, Tanahu, Myagdi and Baglung districts were also anticipating Internet access.

As of 2013 Nepal Wireless serviced more than 140 remote mountain villages.

=== Communications ===
Using Wi-Fi technology, many villages within the project region have been connected to the Public-switched Telephone Network (PSTN). Previously, most of them did not have telephone access. The communications centers in these villages now provide call services, Internet access, and video conferencing facilities. These centers are also capable of providing photocopying, document processing and photography services.

=== Distance Education ===
High school students began using the Internet for educational purposes, and using e-mail to communicate with fellow students abroad.

The project worked with the Open Learning Exchange, Nepal Research and Education Network, a non-governmental organization, to develop interactive educational materials based on government curricula. While live distance education programs have been tested, due to poor video quality, the project is seeking technical assistance to make the system functional. This is required to address the problem of providing education and training in remote areas of Nepal.

=== Telemedicine ===
Three villages, Nangi, Ramche and Tikot, are connected to the city hospital in Pokhara. In order to treat patients, health workers in these villages use video-conferencing facilities to share information with the doctors in the city hospital. The project also helped to launch a telemedicine service between Kathmandu Model Hospital and Dolakha General Hospital, and plans to expand services in the rural areas of Makawanpur.

=== E-Commerce ===
In 2007, with the help of student volunteers of Gandaki College of Engineering and Sciences of Pokhara, the project launched a Web site for local electronic commerce. This Web site is used to trade supplies such as grain, poultry, and cattle. Virtual credit card transaction was also being tested in 2008.

=== Agricultural ===
Farmers have been using the network to buy and sell livestock as well as exchange veterinary tips. The web-based agriculture application called Haatbazar (local market) has facilitated increasingly diverse agriculture applications, including yak raising, cheese making, yak and cow cross-breeding farms, fisheries and vegetable farming.

=== Environmental ===
Nepal Wireless is developing a surveillance system at Chitwan National Park to monitor poachers and to help save endangered species like tigers, leopards, and rhinos. Environmental applications have mostly been collaborations with larger projects, including setting up of weather stations at high altitude locations like Mohare Danda.

=== Social enterprises ===
The project also provides a plant nursery, a carpentry facility, paper-making and sewing machine workshops, a camping ground for trekkers, a fish farm and a yak farm to support the local economy and provide employment.

== Future and long-term goals ==
The future and long-term goals of NWNP include:

1. acquiring additional resources to improve and extend distance education and telemedicine programs
2. running electronic commerce training programs in the villages
3. improving the quality of Internet connectivity
4. extending the existing network and services
5. starting remittance and credit card transactions in the villages and tourist towns
6. organizing training programs to help others replicate the network in other parts of the country
7. developing a formal Web application dedicated to telemedicine
8. adding redundancy and backup to existing network services
9. developing a limited liability company with multiple stakeholders.
