= Sarina Prabasi =

Nepalese-American charity executive

chief executive officer of WaterAid America
- In office May 2014 – October 2019
- Preceded by: David Winder
- Succeeded by: Kelly Parsons

Personal details
- Born: 1973 or 1974 (age 52–53) The Hague, Netherlands
- Citizenship: Nepal
- Spouse: Elias
- Children: Two
- Education: Smith College; School of Oriental and African Studies, University of London
- Website: https://www.sarinaprabasi.net/

Sarina Prabasi (born 1973/1974) is a Nepalese–American Co-Founder of the award winning Buunni Coffee with four cafes in Northern Manhattan and a roastery and co-roasting space in the South Bronx opening soon. Sarina a native of Nepal, spent formative years in India, China, the United States and Ethiopia.

Sarina's journey is marked by a commitment to global social justice and sustainability, with a career in international development, including as the chief executive officer (CEO) of WaterAid America from May 2014 to September 2019, Deputy Chief of Programs for Orbis International, and had been a Country Representative at WaterAid Ethiopia. Sarina is also the author of her published memoir, The Coffee House Resistance Brewing Hope in Desperate Times a dive into the history of coffee houses as sites of community building and activism, and the story of her family’s move from Ethiopia to New York. With a blend of entrepreneurial spirit and commitment to social justice, Sarina inspires and shapes conversations on business, social impact, and the power of community. Sarina has served on the boards of the Specialty Coffee Association, the People’s Theatre Project, and a member of the New York Women’s Culinary Alliance. Prabasi has been recognised for her leadership and innovation, featured in multiple publications including New York Business Journal (“Woman of Influence”) Fortune Magazine and Food & Wine (“Most Innovative Women in Food and Drink”).

Sarina with her husband and co-founder, Elias Gurmu, started Buunni Coffee, an independent company that sells its own roasted Ethiopian coffee, when they moved from Addis Ababa to Washington Heights, New York City in 2011. Buunni is deeply rooted in the Upper Manhattan community, and Sarina has nurtured Buunni into one of Uptown’s most beloved brands, and a hub for community conversation and the arts. While Buunni has kept its presence Uptown, with four coffee shops in Washington Heights and Inwood, Buunni's coffee is now sold at Trader Joe's and the Met Museum Gift shop among others, and the company is opening a coffee roastery in Hunts Point, Bronx as a space for co-roasting and coffee education.

== Personal life ==
Prabasi was born in The Hague, Netherlands, and was brought up in Nepal. She moved to the United States to attend university. She studied at Smith College, and graduated with a Bachelor of Arts (BA) degree havingmajored in economics. She later attended the School of Oriental and African Studies, University of London, graduating with a Master of Science (MSc) degree in development studies.

Prabasi is married to Elias, an Ethiopian.Together they have two daughters.

== Honours ==
In 2015, Prabasi was named one of the 'Most Innovative Women in Food and Drink' by Food & Wine. In 2016, she was named a 'Woman of Influence' by the New York Business Journal.

== Published work ==
Prabasi's first book, The Coffee House Resistance Brewing Hope in Desperate Times, will be published April 9, 2019.
