= Narayan Gurung =

Nepalese former taekwondo practitioner

Narayan Gurung (born 25 January 1964) is a Nepalese former taekwondo practitioner. He represented Nepal at the 1992 Summer Olympics in Barcelona, competing in the men's finweight demonstration event.

== Career ==
Gurung trained in taekwondo in Nepal during the 1980s and 1990s. At the 1992 Summer Olympics in Barcelona, where taekwondo was conducted as a demonstration sport, he competed in the men's finweight division and placed tied for fifth.

Following his athletic career, Gurung relocated to the United States. He has participated in initiatives organized by former Nepalese martial artists residing in the U.S. to support national sports development and athletes in Nepal.

In June 2023, the provincial government of Gandaki Province honored Gurung as an Olympian from Kaski District and announced a provincial allowance in recognition of his service to Nepalese sports.
