= Asta Narayan Manandhar =

Nepalese entrepreneur

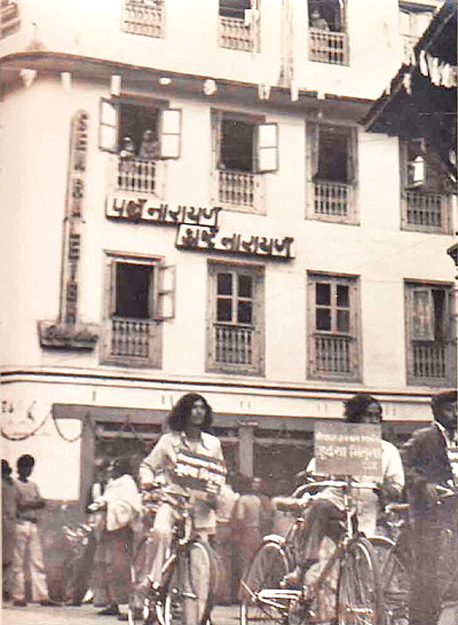
The shop of Pancha Narayan Asta Narayan in 1975

Asta Narayan Manandhar (Nepali: अष्टनारायण मानन्धर) (1900–1960) was a Nepalese entrepreneur who established the first bicycle shop in Kathmandu in 1925 AD. He imported bicycles from Kolkata, India, and transported them over the mountains into Kathmandu by coolie.

== Early life ==
Asta Narayan was born in Maru Dhoka near Kathmandu Durbar Square to father Pancha Narayan and mother Prem Maya Manandhar. Pancha Narayan was a supplier of foodstuffs to the government. The family moved to Asan Kamalachhi in the 1920s.

== Into business ==
Asta Narayan was a bicycle enthusiast as a young man, and chose to become a bicycle seller when he decided to go into business for himself. He set up a store on the ground floor of his house at Kamalachhi and named it Pancha Narayan Asta Narayan.

He traveled out of Kathmandu on foot, and then by train to Kolkata to procure his first stock—six Hercules machines made in Britain. There were no motorables roads into Kathmandu then, and coolies had to be hired to carry the crates over the mountains. From 1934, the firm started selling Raleigh bicycles too.

Asta Narayan's three sons continued the family business which was subsequently taken over by their descendants. Asta Narayan's pioneering venture resulted in Kamalachhi being turned into a street of local bike shops.
