= Shashikala Manandhar =

Nepalese writer

Shashikala Manandhar (born 1960) is a Nepalese novelist. The first female novelist writing in the Nepal Bhasa language, she also writes in Nepali.

Manandhar was born in 1960 in Nepal's capital of Kathmandu. She is a postgraduate in MS. Her first novel was Shaili, published in 1985. although by then she had published Nami in 1982, a collection of short stories; and other literary publications. On 15 January 2003, Manandhar was received the Ganki-Basundhara Award by the Ganki-Basundhara Award Academy.
