= Laxmi Kunwar =

Nepalese swimmer

Personal information
- Born: 29 March 1989 (age 37) Nepal

Sport
- Sport: Swimming
- Classifications: S6, SB5, SM6
- Club: Nepal Spinal Cord Injury Sports Association (NSCISA)

Laxmi Kunwar is the first Nepali athlete to represent Nepal in swimming at the Paralympic Games held in Rio de Janeiro. She participated in the S6 100m freestyle event.

== Personal life ==
At the age of 16, Kunwar fell from a tree while collecting grass in a jungle near her village in Nepal. She sustained a fracture in her spinal cord injuries that paralyzed her legs. Kunwar was forced to drop out of school due to lack of facilities that could support her impairment.

Her family later moved to Kathmandu and she was able to continue her education in Business Administration. Kunwar represents the Nepal Spinal Cord Injury Sports Association.

== Sports ==
Kunwar took up swimming in 2010 and also plays wheelchair basketball. Swimming was initially supposed to help her rehabilitate but then she started playing competitively.

In 2016 representing Nepal, Kunwar participated in the S6 100 meters freestyle event at the Paralympic Summer Games and finished sixth in heat two of the qualifying round. She was eliminated from the competition for the slowest timing. It was a wild card entry opportunity for Kunwar at the Paralympics. She finished 17th overall in the event.

In 2015, Kunwar participated in the S6 100 meters freestyle event at the IPC Swimming World Championships held at Glasgow, Great Britain. She was part of heat one of the qualifying round.

Through sports and participating in various international events, Kunwar wants to help raise awareness about para sports in Nepal. She has joined movement across Nepal that asks for better infrastructure and an accessible environment for people with disabilities.

In 2018, Kunwar participated in the wheelchair basketball event where she participated to all four points for Nepal Spinal Cord Injury Sports Association (NSCISA).

== Awards ==
Kunwar was given the Buddha Harmony Bimala Regmi Social Service Award in 2017 by the Buddha Harmony Foundation in Nepal. This was to recognize Kunwar for her contribution towards the society as a whole.
