= Bharat Singh Mahata =

Nepalese parataekwondo practitioner (born 1997)

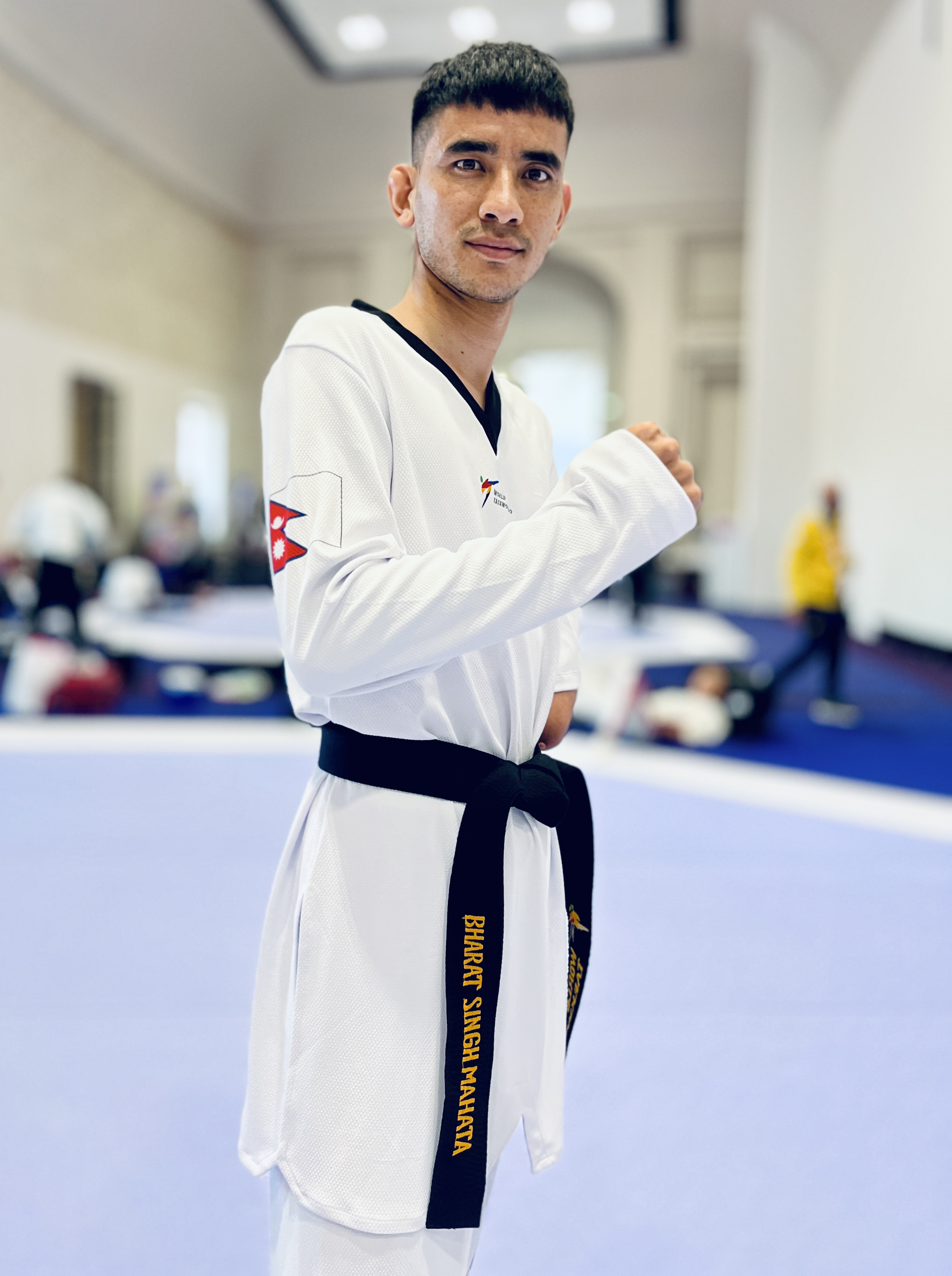

Personal information
- Native name: भरत सिंह महता
- Full name: Bharat Singh Mahata (भरत सिंह महता)
- Nationality: Nepalese
- Born: 12 August 1997 (age 28) Darchula, Nepal
- Height: 1.75 m (5 ft 9 in)
- Parents: Karabir Singh Mahata (father); Dhuma Mahata (mother)

Sport
- Country: Nepal
- Sport: Para Taekwondo
- Disability class: K44
- Coached by: Kabiraj Negi Lama
Medal record
Men's Para Taekwondo
Representing Nepal

Bharat Singh Mahata (Nepali: भरत सिंह महता, born 12 August 1997 in Darchula) is a Nepali parataekwondo practitioner. He competed at the 2024 Summer Paralympics in the 58 kg category.

== Career ==
Mahata has been training with his coach, Kabiraj Negi Lama, in the Nepal Taekwondo Association since 2023.
