= Greece at the Paralympics =

- IPC code: GRE
- NPC: Hellenic Paralympic Committee
- Website: www.paralympic.gr
- Medals Ranked 44th: Gold 23 Silver 43 Bronze 51 Total 117

Summer appearances
- 1976; 1980; 1984; 1988; 1992; 1996; 2000; 2004; 2008; 2012; 2016; 2020; 2024

Winter appearances
- 2002; 2006; 2010; 2014; 2018; 2022; 2026

Greece, the birthplace of the Ancient Olympic Games that hosted the inaugural 1896 Summer Olympics, did not compete in the Summer Paralympics until 1976 and in the Winter Paralympics until 2002, but since then the Greeks have taken part in every edition of both events. Although the Greek delegation traditionally enters first during the parade of nations at the opening ceremony of the Olympic Games, this tradition does not apply to the Paralympics, where Greece enters within alphabetical order. The National Paralympic Committee for Greece is the Hellenic Paralympic Committee.

Greek competitors have won 117 medals, 23 of which gold, and Greece currently ranks 44th in the all-time Summer Paralympic Games. Greece's participation in the Winter Paralympics has been essentially symbolic; it was represented by a single athlete in 2002 and 2006, and by two competitors in 2010. The nation hosted the 2004 Summer Paralympics in Athens. The best Paralympic performance of Greece was in the 2008 Summer Games, when the nation finished 20th with 5 gold medals and 24 in total. The top medal-producing sports have been swimming and athletics, while boccia, powerlifting and wheelchair fencing are the other sports that Greece has also won medals in.

In the 2024 Summer Paralympics in Paris, the Greek won an overall of 13 medals. They were 3 gold medals, 3 silver medals and 7 bronze medals. Another achievement was Athanasios Ghavelas became the first ever Greek paralympic athlete to won a back-to-back gold. Furthermore, Grigoris Polychronidis won his 7th medal in the BC3 category of boccia.

== Medal tables ==
=== Medals by Summer Games ===
Games	Athletes	Gold	Silver	Bronze	Total	Rank
(Canada) 1976 Toronto	3	0	0	0	0	–
(Netherlands) 1980 Arnhem	7	0	0	1	1	35
(United States) 1984 New York/ (United Kingdom) Stoke Mandeville	3	0	0	0	0	−
(South Korea) 1988 Seoul	4	0	1	3	4	43
(Spain) 1992 Barcelona-Madrid	7	0	2	1	3	48
(United States) 1996 Atlanta	16	1	1	3	5	45
(Australia) 2000 Sydney	42	4	4	3	11	33
(Greece) 2004 Athens	124	3	13	4	20	34
(China) 2008 Beijing	69	5	9	10	24	20
(United Kingdom) 2012 London	61	1	3	8	12	44
(Brazil) 2016 Rio de Janeiro	60	5	4	4	13	24
(Japan) 2020 Tokyo	43	1	3	7	11	51
(France) 2024 Paris	37	3	3	7	13	32
(United States) 2028 Los Angeles	Future event					
Total		23	43	51	117	42

=== Medals by sport ===
Sport	Gold	Silver	Bronze	Total
Swimming	11	18	14	43
Athletics	10	20	27	57
Boccia	1	3	3	7
Powerlifting	1	1	3	5
Wheelchair fencing	0	1	1	2
Taekwondo	0	0	2	2
Judo	0	0	1	1
Totals (7 entries)	23	43	51	117

== Medalists ==
Medal	Name	Games	Sport	Event
Bronze	George Mouzakis	(Netherlands) 1980 Arnhem	Athletics	Men's 60m 1B
Silver	Kyriakos Griveas	(South Korea) 1988 Seoul	Swimming	Men's 25m backstroke 1B
Bronze	Georgios Toptsis	(South Korea) 1988 Seoul	Athletics	Men's long jump A6/A8-9/L6
Bronze	Christos Agourakis	(South Korea) 1988 Seoul	Athletics	Men's javelin throw 1B
Bronze	Kyriakos Griveas	(South Korea) 1988 Seoul	Swimming	Men's 50m freestyle 1B
Silver	Georgios Toptsis	(Spain) 1992 Barcelona	Athletics	Men's long jump J4
Silver	Christos Agourakis	(Spain) 1992 Barcelona	Athletics	Men's javelin throw THW3
Bronze	Christos Agourakis	(Spain) 1992 Barcelona	Athletics	Men's shot put THW3
Gold	Dimitrios Konstantakas	(United States) 1996 Atlanta	Athletics	Men's shot put F53
Silver	Konstantinos Fykas	(United States) 1996 Atlanta	Swimming	Men's 50m freestyle S8
Bronze	Stefanos Anargyrou	(United States) 1996 Atlanta	Athletics	Men's shot put F54
Bronze	Georgios Toptsis	(United States) 1996 Atlanta	Athletics	Men's long jump F45-46
Bronze	Antonios Giapoutzis	(United States) 1996 Atlanta	Swimming	Men's 50m butterfly S3
Gold	Athanasios Barakas	(Australia) 2000 Sydney	Athletics	Men's long jump F11
Gold	Stefanos Anargyrou	(Australia) 2000 Sydney	Athletics	Men's shot put F55
Gold	Konstantinos Fykas	(Australia) 2000 Sydney	Swimming	Men's 50m freestyle S8
Gold	Konstantinos Fykas	(Australia) 2000 Sydney	Swimming	Men's 100m freestyle S8
Silver	Parashos Stogiannidis	(Australia) 2000 Sydney	Athletics	Men's high jump F20
Silver	Evangelos Bakolas	(Australia) 2000 Sydney	Athletics	Men's shot put F33
Silver	Eleni Samaritaki	(Australia) 2000 Sydney	Athletics	Women's 200m T36
Silver	Eleni Samaritaki	(Australia) 2000 Sydney	Athletics	Women's 400m T36
Bronze	Symeon Paltsanitidis	(Australia) 2000 Sydney	Athletics	Men's discus throw F55
Bronze	Parashos Stogiannidis	(Australia) 2000 Sydney	Athletics	Men's javelin throw F20
Bronze	Maria Kalpakidou	(Australia) 2000 Sydney	Swimming	Women's 50m backstroke S2
Gold	Charalampos Taiganidis	(Greece) 2004 Athens	Swimming	Men's 100m backstroke S13
Gold	Charalampos Taiganidis	(Greece) 2004 Athens	Swimming	Men's 100m butterfly S13
Gold	Christos Tampaxis	(Greece) 2004 Athens	Swimming	Men's 50m backstroke S1
Silver	Efthymios Kalaras	(Greece) 2004 Athens	Athletics	Men's discus throw F54
Silver	Georgios Karaminas	(Greece) 2004 Athens	Athletics	Men's shot put F52
Silver	Anthi Karagianni	(Greece) 2004 Athens	Athletics	Women's 100m T13
Silver	Anthi Karagianni	(Greece) 2004 Athens	Athletics	Women's 400m T13
Silver	Anthi Karagianni	(Greece) 2004 Athens	Athletics	Women's long jump F13
Silver	Christos Tampaxis	(Greece) 2004 Athens	Swimming	Men's 50m freestyle S1
Silver	Konstantinos Fykas	(Greece) 2004 Athens	Swimming	Men's 50m freestyle S8
Silver	Charalampos Taiganidis	(Greece) 2004 Athens	Swimming	Men's 50m freestyle S13
Silver	Christos Tampaxis	(Greece) 2004 Athens	Swimming	Men's 100m freestyle S1
Silver	Konstantinos Fykas	(Greece) 2004 Athens	Swimming	Men's 100m freestyle S8
Silver	Alexandros Taxildaris	(Greece) 2004 Athens	Swimming	Men's 50m backstroke S1
Silver	Maria Kalpakidou	(Greece) 2004 Athens	Swimming	Women's 50m freestyle S2
Silver	Maria Kalpakidou	(Greece) 2004 Athens	Swimming	Women's 50m backstroke S2
Bronze	Christos Angourakis	(Greece) 2004 Athens	Athletics	Men's shot put F53
Bronze	Paraskevi Kantza	(Greece) 2004 Athens	Athletics	Women's 100m T11
Bronze	Georgios Kapellakis	(Greece) 2004 Athens	Swimming	Men's 50m backstroke S2
Bronze	Ioannis Kostakis	(Greece) 2004 Athens	Swimming	Men's 100m freestyle S3
Gold	Paschalis Stathelakos	(China) 2008 Beijing	Athletics	Men's shot put F40
Gold	Christos Tampaxis	(China) 2008 Beijing	Swimming	Men's 50m backstroke S1
Gold	Georgios Kapellakis	(China) 2008 Beijing	Swimming	Men's 50m freestyle S2
Gold	Charalampos Taiganidis	(China) 2008 Beijing	Swimming	Men's 100m backstroke S13
Gold	Charalampos Taiganidis	(China) 2008 Beijing	Swimming	Men's 100m freestyle S13
Silver	Alexandra Dimoglou	(China) 2008 Beijing	Athletics	Women's 400m T13
Silver	Anthi Karagianni	(China) 2008 Beijing	Athletics	Women's long jump F13
Silver	Grigorios Polychronidis	(China) 2008 Beijing	Boccia	Mixed individual BC3
Silver	Pavlos Mamalos	(China) 2008 Beijing	Powerlifting	Men's -82.5 kg
Silver	Andreas Katsaros	(China) 2008 Beijing	Swimming	Men's 50m backstroke S1
Silver	Charalampos Taiganidis	(China) 2008 Beijing	Swimming	Men's 50m freestyle S13
Silver	Charalampos Taiganidis	(China) 2008 Beijing	Swimming	Men's 100m butterfly S13
Silver	Georgios Kapellakis	(China) 2008 Beijing	Swimming	Men's 100m freestyle S2
Silver	Charalampos Taiganidis	(China) 2008 Beijing	Swimming	Men's 200m individual medley SM13
Bronze	Ioannis Protos	(China) 2008 Beijing	Athletics	Men's 400m T13
Bronze	Anthanasios Barakas	(China) 2008 Beijing	Athletics	Men's long jump F11
Bronze	Che Jon Fernandes	(China) 2008 Beijing	Athletics	Men's shot put F53/54
Bronze	Anastasios Tsiou	(China) 2008 Beijing	Athletics	Men's shot put F57/58
Bronze	Alexandra Dimoglou	(China) 2008 Beijing	Athletics	Women's 100m T13
Bronze	Alexandra Dimoglou	(China) 2008 Beijing	Athletics	Women's 200m T13
Bronze	Maria Stamatoula	(China) 2008 Beijing	Athletics	Women's shot put F32-34/52/53
Bronze	Georgios Kapellakis	(China) 2008 Beijing	Swimming	Men's 50m backstroke S2
Bronze	Georgios Kapellakis	(China) 2008 Beijing	Swimming	Men's 200m freestyle S2
Bronze	Charalampos Taiganidis	(China) 2008 Beijing	Swimming	Men's 400m freestyle S13
Gold	Maria-Eleni Kordali; Nikolaos Pananos; Grigorios Polychronidis	(United Kingdom) 2012 London	Boccia	Mixed pairs BC3
Silver	Paschalis Stathelakos	(United Kingdom) 2012 London	Athletics	Men's discus throw F40
Silver	Christos Tampaxis	(United Kingdom) 2012 London	Swimming	Men's 50m backstroke S1
Silver	Aristeidis Makrodimitris	(United Kingdom) 2012 London	Swimming	Men's 50m backstroke S2
Bronze	Manolis Stefanoudakis	(United Kingdom) 2012 London	Athletics	Men's javelin throw F54/55/56
Bronze	Paschalis Stathelakos	(United Kingdom) 2012 London	Athletics	Men's shot put F40
Bronze	Alexandra Dimoglou	(United Kingdom) 2012 London	Athletics	Women's 400m T13
Bronze	Anthi Karagianni	(United Kingdom) 2012 London	Athletics	Women's long jump F13
Bronze	Pavlos Mamalos	(United Kingdom) 2012 London	Powerlifting	Men's -90 kg
Bronze	Aristeidis Makrodimitris	(United Kingdom) 2012 London	Swimming	Men's 50m freestyle S2
Bronze	Charalampos Taiganidis	(United Kingdom) 2012 London	Swimming	Men's 100m backstroke S13
Bronze	Aristeidis Makrodimitris	(United Kingdom) 2012 London	Swimming	Men's 100m freestyle S2
Gold	Manolis Stefanoudakis	(Brazil) 2016 Rio de Janeiro	Athletics	Men's javelin throw F53/54
Gold	Athanasios Konstantinidis	(Brazil) 2016 Rio de Janeiro	Athletics	Men's shot put F32
Gold	Che Jon Fernandes	(Brazil) 2016 Rio de Janeiro	Athletics	Men's shot put F53
Gold	Pavlos Mamalos	(Brazil) 2016 Rio de Janeiro	Powerlifting	Men's -107 kg
Gold	Dimosthenis Michalentzakis	(Brazil) 2016 Rio de Janeiro	Swimming	Men's 100m butterfly S9
Silver	Athanasios Konstantinidis	(Brazil) 2016 Rio de Janeiro	Athletics	Men's club throw F31/32
Silver	Dimitrios Senikidis	(Brazil) 2016 Rio de Janeiro	Athletics	Men's shot put F20
Silver	Grigorios Polychronidis	(Brazil) 2016 Rio de Janeiro	Boccia	Mixed individual BC3
Silver	Panagiotis Triantafyllou	(Brazil) 2016 Rio de Janeiro	Wheelchair fencing	Men's individual sabre B
Bronze	Dimitrios Zisidis	(Brazil) 2016 Rio de Janeiro	Athletics	Men's shot put F32
Bronze	Dimitra Korokida	(Brazil) 2016 Rio de Janeiro	Athletics	Women's shot put F53
Bronze	Anna Ntenta; Nikolaos Pananos; Grigorios Polychronidis	(Brazil) 2016 Rio de Janeiro	Boccia	Mixed pairs BC3
Bronze	Dimitrios Bakochristos	(Brazil) 2016 Rio de Janeiro	Powerlifting	Men's -54 kg
Gold	Athanasios Ghavelas	(Japan) 2020 Tokyo	Athletics	Men's 100 metres T11
Silver	Athanasios Konstantinidis	(Japan) 2020 Tokyo	Athletics	Men's club throw F32
Silver	Grigorios Polychronidis	(Japan) 2020 Tokyo	Boccia	Mixed individual BC3
Silver	Athanasios Prodromou	(Japan) 2020 Tokyo	Athletics	Men's long jump T20
Bronze	Panagiotis Triantafyllou	(Japan) 2020 Tokyo	Wheelchair fencing	Men's individual sabre B
Bronze	Dimosthenis Michalentzakis	(Japan) 2020 Tokyo	Swimming	Men's 100m freestyle S8
Bronze	Dimitrios Bakochristos	(Japan) 2020 Tokyo	Powerlifting	Men's 54 kg
Bronze	Antonios Tsapatakis	(Japan) 2020 Tokyo	Swimming	Men's 100m Breast SB4
Bronze	Efstratios Nikolaidis	(Japan) 2020 Tokyo	Athletics	Men's Shot Put F20
Bronze	Alexandra Stamatopoulou	(Japan) 2020 Tokyo	Swimming	Women's 50 m. Backstroke S4
Bronze	Grigorios Polychronidis Anna Ntenta Anastasia Pyrgiotis	(Japan) 2020 Tokyo	Boccia	Mixed pairs BC3
Gold	Athanasios Konstantinidis	(France) 2024 Paris	Athletics	Men's shot put F32
Gold	Athanasios Ghavelas	(France) 2024 Paris	Athletics	Men's 100 metres T11
Gold	Alexandra Stamatopoulou	(France) 2024 Paris	Swimming	Women's 50 m backststroke S4
Silver	Athanasios Konstantinidis	(France) 2024 Paris	Athletics	Men's club throw F32
Silver	Lida-Maria Manthopoulou	(France) 2024 Paris	Athletics	100 metres T38
Silver	Antonios Tsapatakis	(France) 2024 Paris	Swimming	Men's 100 m breaststroke SB4
Bronze	Christina Gkentzou	(France) 2024 Paris	Taekwondo	Women's 65 kg
Bronze	Eleni Papastamatopoulou	(France) 2024 Paris	Taekwondo	Women's +65 kg
Bronze	Grigorios Polychronidis	(France) 2024 Paris	Boccia	Men's individual BC3
Bronze	Konstantinos Tzounis	(France) 2024 Paris	Athletics	Men's discus throw F56
Bronze	Lazaros Stefanidis	(France) 2024 Paris	Athletics	Men's shot put F32
Bronze	Manolis Stefanoudakis	(France) 2024 Paris	Athletics	Men's javelin throw F54
Bronze	Theodora Paschalidou	(France) 2024 Paris	Judo	Women's 70kg J1

== Top medalists ==
The table below lists the top Paralympic medalists for Greece, sorted by gold, silver and then bronze medals.

Athlete	Sport	Games	Gold medal	Silver medal	Bronze medal	Total
Charalampos Taiganidis	Swimming	2004–2008–2012	4	4	2	10
Konstantinos Fykas	Swimming	1996–2000–2004	2	3	0	5
Christos Tampaxis	Swimming	2004–2008–2012	2	3	0	5
Athanasios Konstantinidis	Athletics	2016–2020–2024	2	3	0	5
Athanasios Ghavelas	Athletics	2020–2024	2	0	0	2
Grigorios Polychronidis	Boccia	2008–2012–2016–2020–2024	1	3	3	7
Georgios Kapellakis	Swimming	2004–2008	1	1	3	5
Paschalis Stathelakos	Athletics	2008–2012	1	1	1	3
Pavlos Mamalos	Powerlifting	2008–2012–2016	1	1	1	3
Manolis Stefanoudakis	Athletics	2012–2016–2024	1	0	2	3

== See also ==
- Greece at the Olympics
