= Greece at the 2020 Summer Paralympics =

- Flag of Greece
- IPC code: GRE
- NPC: Hellenic Paralympic Committee
- Website: www.paralympic.gr

in Tokyo, Japan 24 August 2021 – 5 September 2021
- Competitors: 43 in 11 sports
- Flag bearers (opening): Athanasios Konstantinidis; Anna Ntenta
- Flag bearers (closing): Athanasios Ghavelas; Sotiriοs Garaganis
- Medals Ranked 51st: Gold 1 Silver 3 Bronze 7 Total 11

Summer Paralympics appearances (overview)
- 1976; 1980; 1984; 1988; 1992; 1996; 2000; 2004; 2008; 2012; 2016; 2020; 2024

Greece competed at the 2020 Summer Paralympics in Tokyo, Japan, from 24 August to 5 September 2021.

== Medalists ==
Medal	Name	Sport	Event	Date
Gold	Athanasios Ghavelas; Guide: Sotiriοs Garaganis	Athletics	Men's 100 metres T11	2 September
Silver	Athanasios Konstantinidis	Athletics	Men's club throw F32	28 August
Silver	Grigorios Polychronidis	Boccia	Mixed individual BC3	1 September
Silver	Athanasios Prodromou	Athletics	Men's long jump T20	4 September
Bronze	Panagiotis Triantafyllou	Wheelchair fencing	Men's sabre B	25 August
Bronze	Dimosthenis Michalentzakis	Swimming	Men's 100 metre freestyle S8	25 August
Bronze	Dimitrios Bakochristos	Powerlifting	Men's 54 kg	26 August
Bronze	Antonios Tsapatakis	Swimming	Men's 100 metre breaststroke SB4	29 August
Bronze	Efstratios Nikolaidis	Athletics	Men's shot put F20	31 August
Bronze	Alexandra Stamatopoulou	Swimming	Women's 50 metre backstroke S4	3 September
Bronze	Grigorios Polychronidis; Anna Ntenta; Anastasia Pyrgioti	Boccia	Mixed pairs BC3	4 September

Multiple medalists
Name	Sport	1st place, gold medalist(s)	2nd place, silver medalist(s)	3rd place, bronze medalist(s)	Total
Grigorios Polychronidis	Boccia	0	1	1	2

Medals by sport
Sport	Gold medal	Silver medal	Bronze medal	Total
Athletics	1	2	1	4
Boccia	0	1	1	2
Swimming	0	0	3	3
Powerlifting	0	0	1	1
Wheelchair Fencing	0	0	1	1
Total	1	3	7	11

== Archery ==
Women

Athlete	Event	Ranking round		Round of 32	Round of 16	Quarterfinals	Semifinals	Final / BM	
Athlete	Event	Score	Seed	Opposition Score	Opposition Score	Opposition Score	Opposition Score	Opposition Score	Rank
Dorothea Poimenidou	Individual Recurve Open	586 SB	7						4

== Athletics ==
Men's track

Athlete	Event	Heats		Final	
Athlete	Event	Result	Rank	Result	Rank
Athanasios Ghavelas; Guide: Sotiriοs Garaganis	100m T11	10.88 Q,WR	1	10.82 WR	1st place, gold medalist(s)
Michail Seitis	100m T64	11.66 SB	13	Did not advance	
Michail Seitis	200m T64	22.95 Q SB	7	22.87 SB	6

Men's field

Athlete	Event	Final	
Athlete	Event	Result	Rank
Che Jon Fernandes	Shot put F53	7.63 SB	5
Konstantinos Tzounis	Discus throw F56	42.86 AR	4
Konstantinos Kamaras	Long jump T37	5.95	6
Athanasios Konstantinidis	Club throw F32	38.63	2nd place, silver medalist(s)
Athanasios Konstantinidis	Shot put F32	9.58	6
Stylianos Malakopoulos	Long jump T64	7.04 =WR	4
Efstratios Nikolaidis	Shot put F20	15.93	3rd place, bronze medalist(s)
Leontios Stefanidis	Shot put F20	15.75 PB	4
Athanasios Prodromou	Long jump T20	7.17 PB	2nd place, silver medalist(s)
Manolis Stefanoudakis	Javelin throw F54	30.45	4

Women's field

Athlete	Event	Final		
Athlete	Event	Result	Points	Rank
Anthi Liagkou	Shot put F33	5.25	-	8
Zoi Mantoudi	Shot put F20	13.47 NR	-	6
Styliani Smaragdi	Long jump T47	5.19	-	6

== Boccia ==
Grigorios Polychronidis, Anastasia Pyrgiotis and Anna Ntenta have all qualified for the Games..

Individual

Athlete	Event	Pool Matches				Quarterfinals	Semifinals	Final / BM	
Athlete	Event	Opposition Score	Opposition Score	Opposition Score	Rank	Opposition Score	Opposition Score	Opposition Score	Rank
Grigorios Polychronidis	Mixed Ιndividual BC3			—N/a					2nd place, silver medalist(s)
Anna Ntenta	Mixed Ιndividual BC3			—N/a	Did not advance				
Anastasia Pyrgioti	Mixed Ιndividual BC3			—N/a	Did not advance				

Pairs and Teams

Athlete	Event	Pool matches				Quarterfinals	Semifinals	Final / BM	
Athlete	Event	Opposition Score	Opposition Score	Opposition Score	Rank	Opposition Score	Opposition Score	Opposition Score	Rank
Grigorios Polychronidis; Anna Ntenta; Anastasia Pyrgioti	Mixed Pairs BC3					—N/a			3rd place, bronze medalist(s)

== Cycling ==
Athlete	Event	Final	
Athlete	Event	Score	Rank
Nikolaos Papagelis	Men's road time trial C2	37:55.05	7
Aikaterini El Latif	Women's road time trial T1-2	1:32.08	6

== Judo ==
Theodora Paschalidou has qualified for the Games.

Athlete	Event	Round of 16	Quarterfinals	Semifinals	Final / BM	
Athlete	Event	Opposition Result	Opposition Result	Opposition Result	Opposition Result	Rank
Theodora Paschalidou	Women's 70 kg		Did not advance			7

== Powerlifting ==
Men

Athlete	Event	Total lifted	Rank
Dimitrios Bakochristos	−54 kg	165	3rd place, bronze medalist(s)
Paschalis Kouloumoglou	−59 kg	163	7
Gkremislav Moysiadis	−80 kg	187	7
Kostantinos Dimou	+107kg	218	5

== Shooting ==
Greece entered one athletes into the Paralympic competition. Sotirios Galogavros successfully break the Paralympic qualification at the 2019 WSPS World Championships which was held in Sydney, Australia.

Athlete	Event	Qualification		Final	
Athlete	Event	Score	Rank	Score	Rank
Sotirios Galogavros	Mixed R3 – 10 m air rifle prone SH1	612,6	11	-	-

== Swimming ==
Twelve Greek swimmers are qualified to compete.

Men

Athlete	Event	Heats		Final	
Athlete	Event	Result	Rank	Result	Rank
Panagiotis Christakis	50m butterfly SM6	36.84		Did not advance	15
Panagiotis Christakis	200m medley SM6	2:56.75		Did not advance	12
Dimitrios Karypidis	100m backstroke S1			2:58.07 PB	4
Ioannis Kostakis	150m medley SM3			3:43.75	8
Ioannis Kostakis	50m breaststroke SB2			1:08.73	6
Ioannis Kostakis	200m freestyle S3	4:31.22	6	Did not advance	12
Alexandros-Stylianos Lergios	200m freestyle S5				
Gerasimos Lignos	100m backstroke S13	1:06.76		Did not advance	12
Aristeidis Makrodimitris	200m freestyle S2	-	-	4:44.53	7
Aristeidis Makrodimitris	50m backstroke S2	1:04.01	8 Q	1:03.28	7
Aristeidis Makrodimitris	100m backstroke S2			2:14.54 PB	5
Dimosthenis Michalentzakis	100 m freestyle S8	59.49	2 Q	58.73	3rd place, bronze medalist(s)
Dimosthenis Michalentzakis	200m medley SM8			2:27.57	6
Dimosthenis Michalentzakis	100m butterfly S8	1:05.69	5	Did not advance	9
Charalampos Taiganidis	100 m backstroke S12			1:02.16	4
Antonios Tsapatakis	100 m breaststroke SB4			1:40:20	3rd place, bronze medalist(s)

Women

Athlete	Event	Heats		Final	
Athlete	Event	Result	Rank	Result	Rank
Efthymia Gkouli	100m breaststroke SB8			1:31.57	8
Alexandra Stamatopoulou	50m backstroke S4	48.36	2 Q	49.63	3rd place, bronze medalist(s)
Alexandra Stamatopoulou	50m freestyle S4	46.61	5	Did not advance	9
Maria Tsakona	100m breaststroke SB5	2:02.32		Did not advance	10

== Table tennis ==
Marios Chatzikyriakos has qualified for the Games.

Men

Athlete	Event	Group Stage			Round 1	Quarterfinals	Semifinals	Final	
Athlete	Event	Opposition Result	Opposition Result	Rank	Opposition Result	Opposition Result	Opposition Result	Opposition Result	Rank
Marios Chatzikyriakos	Individual C6								

== Wheelchair fencing ==
Vasilis Dounis and Panagiotis Triantafyllou have qualified for the Games.

Men

Athlete	Event	Pool matches		Quarterfinals	Semifinals	Final / BM	
Athlete	Event	Opposition Score	Rank	Opposition Score	Opposition Score	Opposition Score	Rank
Vasileios Ntounis	Sabre A						
Panagiotis Triantafyllou	Sabre B						3rd place, bronze medalist(s)

== Wheelchair tennis ==
Greece qualified two players entries for wheelchair tennis. All of them qualified by the world rankings.

Athlete	Event	Round of 64	Round of 32	Round of 16	Quarterfinals	Semifinals	Final / BM	
Athlete	Event	Opposition Result	Opposition Result	Opposition Result	Opposition Result	Opposition Result	Opposition Result	Rank
Stefanos Diamantis	Men's singles	Gergely (SVK); L 6^{4}–7, 6–3, 0–6	Did not advance					

== See also ==
- Greece at the Paralympics
- Greece at the 2020 Summer Olympics
