= Greece at the 2016 Summer Paralympics =

- IPC code: GRE
- NPC: Hellenic Paralympic Committee
- Website: www.paralympic.gr

in Rio de Janeiro
- Competitors: 60 in 12 sports
- Flag bearers: Grigorios Polychronidis (Opening); Athanasios Konstantinidis (Closing)
- Medals Ranked 24th: Gold 5 Silver 4 Bronze 4 Total 13

Summer Paralympics appearances (overview)
- 1976; 1980; 1984; 1988; 1992; 1996; 2000; 2004; 2008; 2012; 2016; 2020; 2024

Greece competed at the 2016 Summer Paralympics in Rio de Janeiro, Brazil, from 7 September to 18 September 2016. The first places the team qualified were for three athletes in sailing events.

== Funding and support ==
Funding for Greece's national Paralympic committee comes through the Greek Ministry of Sports and the General Secretariat of Sports. While Greek Paralympians get some support from their national sport federations, many were also getting support from the Greek NPC. The economic situation in the country led to less funding from the government, which caused the Greeks rely more on sponsorship to serve a stop gap measure. One of the biggest sponsors was OPAP, Greece's national lottery. In a few cases, Greek athletes had to self-fund if they wanted to participate internationally as their NPC did not have the funds. In 2013, there was also a tremendous discrepancy in funding between Paralympic sport and Olympic sport, with the Olympic side getting €1,400,000 while the Paralympic side got €200,000.

== Disability classifications ==
Every participant at the Paralympics has their disability grouped into one of five disability categories; amputation, the condition may be congenital or sustained through injury or illness; cerebral palsy; wheelchair athletes, there is often overlap between this and other categories; visual impairment, including blindness; Les autres, any physical disability that does not fall strictly under one of the other categories, for example dwarfism or multiple sclerosis. Each Paralympic sport then has its own classifications, dependent upon the specific physical demands of competition. Events are given a code, made of numbers and letters, describing the type of event and classification of the athletes competing. Some sports, such as athletics, divide athletes by both the category and severity of their disabilities, other sports, for example swimming, group competitors from different categories together, the only separation being based on the severity of the disability.

== Medalists ==
Medal	Name	Sport	Event	Date
Gold	Athanasios Konstantinidis	Athletics	Men's Shot Put F32	8 September
Gold	Manolis Stefanoudakis	Athletics	Men's Javelin Throw F53/54	9 September
Gold	Pavlos Mamalos	Powerlifting	Men's −107 kg	14 September
Gold	Che Jon Fernandes	Athletics	Men's Shot Put F53	14 September
Gold	Dimosthenis Michalentzakis	Swimming	Men's 100 m butterfly S9	15 September
Silver	Dimitrios Senikidis	Athletics	Men's Shot Put F20	10 September
Silver	Panagiotis Triantafyllou	Wheelchair Fencing	Men's Sabre B	12 September
Silver	Athanasios Konstantinidis	Athletics	Men's Club Throw F31/32	13 September
Silver	Grigorios Polychronidis	Boccia	Mixed Individual BC3	16 September
Bronze	Dimitrios Zisidis	Athletics	Men's Shot Put F32	8 September
Bronze	Dimitrios Bakochristos	Powerlifting	Men's −54 kg	9 September
Bronze	Dimitra Korokida	Athletics	Women's Shot Put F53	12 September
Bronze	Anna Ntenta; Nikolaos Pananos; Grigorios Polychronidis	Boccia	Mixed Pairs BC3	12 September

Multiple medalists
Name	Sport	1st place, gold medalist(s)	2nd place, silver medalist(s)	3rd place, bronze medalist(s)	Total
Athanasios Konstantinidis	Athletics	1	1	0	2
Grigorios Polychronidis	Boccia	0	1	1	2

Medals by sport
Sport	Gold medal	Silver medal	Bronze medal	Total
Athletics	3	2	2	7
Powerlifting	1	0	1	2
Swimming	1	0	0	1
Boccia	0	1	1	2
Wheelchair Fencing	0	1	0	1
Total	5	4	4	13

Medals by day
Day	Date	1st place, gold medalist(s)	2nd place, silver medalist(s)	3rd place, bronze medalist(s)	Total
1	8 September	1	0	1	2
2	9 September	1	0	1	2
3	10 September	0	1	0	1
5	12 September	0	1	2	3
6	13 September	0	1	0	1
7	14 September	2	0	0	2
8	15 September	1	0	0	1
9	16 September	0	1	0	1
Total		5	4	4	13

Medals by gender
Gender	1st place, gold medalist(s)	2nd place, silver medalist(s)	3rd place, bronze medalist(s)	Total
Male	5	4	2	11
Female	0	0	1	1
Mixed	0	0	1	1
Total	5	4	4	13

== Competitors ==
The following is the list of number of competitors participating in the Games:

Sport	Men	Women	Total
Archery	0	1	1
Athletics	13	5	18
Boccia	3	2	5
Canoe Sprint	0	2	2
Cycling	1	2	3
Judo	1	0	1
Powerlifting	6	0	6
Sailing	3	0	3
Shooting	1	0	1
Swimming	12	4	16
Wheelchair Fencing	3	1	4
Wheelchair Tennis	1	0	1
Total	44	16	60

== Archery ==
Dorothea Poimenidou earned Greece a spot at the Rio Games following her performance at the 2015 World Archery Para Championships. She qualified the country after her performance in the women's recurve open.

Women

Athlete	Event	Ranking round		Round of 32	Round of 16	Quarterfinals	Semifinals	Final / BM	
Athlete	Event	Score	Seed	Opposition Score	Opposition Score	Opposition Score	Opposition Score	Opposition Score	Rank
Dorothea Poimenidou	Individual Recurve Open	605	7	Duboc (FRA); L 4-6	Did not advance				

== Athletics ==
Men

Track

Athlete	Event	Classification	Heat		Final	
Athlete	Event	Classification	Time	Rank	Time	Rank
Christos Koutoulias	100m	T45/46/47	11.52	10	Did not advance	
Michail Seitis	100m	T43/44	11.30 PB	10	Did not advance	
Michail Seitis	200m	T43/44	22.45 PB	7 q	23.63	7
Michail Seitis	400m	T43/44	49.81 WR	6 q	49.66 WR	6
Christos Koutoulias; Ioannis Sevdikalis; Konstantin Veltsi; Michail Seitis	4 × 100 m relay	T42-47	—N/a		47.79	5

Field

Athlete	Event	Classification	Final	
Athlete	Event	Classification	Distance	Position
Dimitrios Zisidis	Shot put	F32	9.24 PB	3rd place, bronze medalist(s)
Nikolaos Gonios	Shot put	F32	7.00	10
Athanasios Konstantinidis	Shot put	F32	10.39 WR	1st place, gold medalist(s)
Che Jon Fernandes	Shot put	F53	8.44	1st place, gold medalist(s)
Dimitrios Senikidis	Shot put	F20	16.17	2nd place, silver medalist(s)
Efstratios Nikolaidis	Shot put	F20	15.69	4
Athanasios Konstantinidis	Club Throw	F31/32	33.69	2nd place, silver medalist(s)
Dimitrios Zisidis	Club Throw	F31/32	22.24	6
Nikolaos Gonios	Club Throw	F31/32	27.26	5
Christos Kapellas	Long Jump	T43/44	6.40	7
Christos Koutoulias	Long Jump	T45/46/47	6.43	13
Evangelos Kanavos	Long Jump	T20	6.48	9
Konstantin Veltsi	Long Jump	T43/44	5.59	12
Michail Seitis	Long Jump	T43/44	6.20	9
Manolis Stefanoudakis	Javelin Throw	F53/54	29.45 PR	1st place, gold medalist(s)

Women

Track

Athlete	Event	Classification	Heat		Final	
Athlete	Event	Classification	Time	Rank	Time	Rank
Styliani Smaragdi	100m	T45/46/47	13.70	11	Did not advance	

Field

Athlete	Event	Classification	Final	
Athlete	Event	Classification	Distance	Position
Anthi Liagkou	Shot put	F33	4.69	5
Dimitra Korokida	Shot put	F53	4.28	3rd place, bronze medalist(s)
Valasia Kyrgiovanaki	Shot put	F20	12.11	4
Zoi Mantoudi	Shot put	F20	11.31	9
Styliani Smaragdi	Long Jump	T45/46/47	4.87	10

== Boccia ==
Individual

Athlete	Event	Pool Matches				Quarterfinals	Semifinals	Final / BM	
Athlete	Event	Opposition Score	Opposition Score	Opposition Score	Rank	Opposition Score	Opposition Score	Opposition Score	Rank
Grigorios Polychronidis	Mixed Ιndividual BC3	McCowan (GBR); W 9-1	Michel (AUS); W 7-2	—N/a	1 Q	Ho (HKG); W 2-2 Tiebrake Win	Kim (KOR); W 4-1	Jeong (KOR); L 1-8	2nd place, silver medalist(s)
Anna Ntenta	Mixed Ιndividual BC3	Cilissen (BEL); W 1-6	Ho (HKG); L 6-1	—N/a	2	Did not advance			
Panagiotis Soulanis	Mixed Ιndividual BC1	Prado (ESP); W 6-1	Ibarbure (ARG); W 6-4	Leung Yee (HKG); L 0-9	2 Q	Perez (NED); L 0-13	Did not advance		
Chrysi Morfi Metzou	Mixed Ιndividual BC4	Leung Wing (HKG); L 2-13	Seo (KOR); L 1-10	Vieira (POR); L 1-6	4	Did not advance			

Pairs and Teams

Athlete	Event	Pool matches				Quarterfinals	Semifinals	Final / BM	
Athlete	Event	Opposition Score	Opposition Score	Opposition Score	Rank	Opposition Score	Opposition Score	Opposition Score	Rank
Anna Ntenta; Nikolaos Pananos; Grigorios Polychronidis	Mixed Pairs BC3	Singapore (SIN); L 2–3	Great Britain (GBR); W 4–1	Portugal (POR); W 5–2	2 Q	—N/a	South Korea (KOR); L 1–6	Singapore (SIN); W 8–1	3rd place, bronze medalist(s)

== Cycling ==
=== Road ===
Men

Athlete	Event	Time	Rank
Athanasios Barakas	Men's Road Race B	DNF	
Athanasios Barakas	Men's Road Time Trial B	45:38.46	21

Women

Athlete	Event	Time	Rank
Adamantia Chalkiadaki	Women's Road Race B	2:02.52	6
Adamantia Chalkiadaki	Women's Road Time Trial B	43:03.79	12
Paraskevi Kantza	Women's Road Race B	2:43.00	16
Paraskevi Kantza	Women's Road Time Trial B	50:36.79	17

=== Track ===
Men

Athlete	Event	Qualification		Final	
Athlete	Event	Time	Rank	Time/Opposition Result	Rank
Athanasios Barakas	Men's B 4000m Individual Pursuit	5:03.979	16	Did not advance	
Athanasios Barakas	Men's B 1000m Time Trial	—N/a		1:07.479	10

Women

Athlete	Event	Qualification		Final	
Athlete	Event	Time	Rank	Time/Opposition Result	Rank
Adamantia Chalkiadaki	Women's B 3000m Individual Pursuit	3:46.620	10	Did not advance	
Adamantia Chalkiadaki	Women's B 1000m Time Trial	—N/a		1:13.431	10
Paraskevi Kantza	Women's B 3000m Individual Pursuit	4:14.308	14	Did not advance	
Paraskevi Kantza	Women's B 1000m Time Trial	—N/a		1:23.748	14

== Judo ==
Men

Athlete	Event	Round of 16	Quarterfinals	Semifinals	Repechage 1	Repechage 2	Final / BM	
Athlete	Event	Opposition Result	Opposition Result	Opposition Result	Opposition Result	Opposition Result	Opposition Result	Rank
Theoklitos Papachristos	−100 kg	Bolukbasi (TUR); L 000–100	Did not advance					

== Paracanoeing ==
Canoe Sprint
Women

Athlete	Event	Heats		Semifinal		Final	
Athlete	Event	Time	Rank	Time	Rank	Time	Rank
Eleni Prelorentzou	KL1	1:53.367	10 SF	1:44.092	5	Did not advance	

== Powerlifting ==
Men

Athlete	Event	Total lifted	Rank
Nikolaos Gkountanis	−65 kg	181	5
Pavlos Mamalos	−107 kg	238	1st place, gold medalist(s)
Dimitrios Bakochristos	−54 kg	162	3rd place, bronze medalist(s)
Paschalis Kouloumoglou	−59kg	145	5
Kostantinos Dimou	+107kg	220	4
Gkremislav Moysiadis	−80kg	165	8

== Sailing ==
Mixed

Athlete	Event	Race											Total points	Rank
Athlete	Event	1	2	3	4	5	6	7	8	9	10	11	Total points	Rank
Theodoros Alexas; Vasileios Christoforou; Argyris Notaroglou	3-Person Keelboat (Sonar)	3	6	3	~~10~~	7	6	4	10	1	9	9	58	7

== Shooting ==
Mixed

Athlete	Event	Qualification		Final	
Athlete	Event	Score	Rank	Score	Rank
Evangelos Kakosaios	Mixed R4 – 10 m Air Rifle Standing SH2	622.8	23	Did not advance	

== Swimming ==
Men

Athlete	Event	Heats		Final	
Athlete	Event	Time	Rank	Time	Rank
Antonios Tsapatakis	50 m Freestyle S5	37.57	11	Did not advance	
Antonios Tsapatakis	50 m Butterfly S5	44.55	13	Did not advance	
Antonios Tsapatakis	100 m Breaststroke SB4	—N/a		1:37.69	4
Aristeidis Makrodimitris	200 m Freestyle S2	5:03.56	6 Q	4:57.90	6
Aristeidis Makrodimitris	50 m Backstroke S2	1:02.29	7 Q	1:03.46	7
Aristeidis Makrodimitris	100 m Backstroke S2	2:19.25	7	2:22.45	8
Charalampos Taiganidis	50 m Freestyle S12	24.97	6 Q	24.99	6
Charalampos Taiganidis	100 m Backstroke S12	1:03.70	6 Q	1:01.21	4
Christos Tampaxis	50 m Backstroke S1	—N/a		1:22.30	4
Christos Tampaxis	100 m Backstroke S1	—N/a		2:54.23	4
Dimitrios Karypidis	50 m Backstroke S1	—N/a		1:32.09	5
Dimitrios Karypidis	100 m Backstroke S1	—N/a		3:12.73	6
Dimosthenis Michalentzakis	50 m Freestyle S9	27.50	13	Did not advance	
Dimosthenis Michalentzakis	100 m Butterfly S9	1:01.91	3 Q	59.27 PR	1st place, gold medalist(s)
Dimosthenis Michalentzakis	200 m Medley SM9	2:26.15	10	Did not advance	
Georgios Kapellakis	50 m Backstroke S2	1:14.47	11	Did not advance	
Georgios Kapellakis	100 m Backstroke S2	2:45.85	9	Did not advance	
Georgios Sfaltos	50 m Freestyle S6	32.65	11	Did not advance	
Georgios Sfaltos	100 m Freestyle S6	1:12.15	11	Did not advance	
Georgios Sfaltos	100 m Breaststroke SB5	1:40.17	6 Q	1:40.05 NR	6
Gerasimos Lignos	50 m Freestyle S13	27.09	18	Did not advance	
Gerasimos Lignos	100 m Breaststroke SB13	1:14.25	7 Q	1:13.68	6
Gerasimos Lignos	100 m Backstroke S13	1:09.65	10	Did not advance	
Ioannis Kostakis	50 m Freestyle S3	55.45	8 Q	53.95	7
Ioannis Kostakis	200 m Freestyle S3	—N/a		4:01.46	7
Ioannis Kostakis	50 m Breaststroke SB2	DSQ		Did not advance	
Ioannis Kostakis	50 m Backstroke S3	1:17.35	10	Did not advance	
Ioannis Kostakis	150 m Medley SM3	DNS		Did not advance	
Konstantinos Karaouzas	50 m Breaststroke SB3	54.37	9	Did not advance	
Panagiotis Christakis	50 m Freestyle S6	31.94	9	Did not advance	
Panagiotis Christakis	100 m Freestyle S6	1:14.05	13	Did not advance	
Panagiotis Christakis	50 m Butterfly S6	35.46	11	Did not advance	
Panagiotis Christakis	100 m Breaststroke SB6	1:37.98	11	Did not advance	
Panagiotis Christakis	200 m Medley SM6	2:59.64	9	Did not advance	

Women

Athlete	Event	Heat		Final	
Athlete	Event	Time	Rank	Time	Rank
Alexandra Stamatopoulou	100 m Freestyle S3	1:44.29	5 Q	1:47.16	6
Alexandra Stamatopoulou	50 m Backstroke S3	58.47	5 Q	58.33	5
Chrysoula Antoniadou	200 m Freestyle S5	3:48.62	11	Did not advance	
Chrysoula Antoniadou	100 m Breaststroke SB4	2:06.92	8 Q	2:06.24	7
Maria Kalpakidou	50 m Backstroke S2	—N/a		1:24.45	5
Maria Kalpakidou	100 m Backstroke S2	—N/a		3:00.72	5
Semicha Rizaoglou	50 m Freestyle S4	1:11.60	16	Did not advance	
Semicha Rizaoglou	100 m Freestyle S3	2:30.78	11	Did not advance	
Semicha Rizaoglou	50 m Backstroke S3	1:06.18	7 Q	1:12.05	8

Mixed

Athlete	Event	Heat		Final	
Athlete	Event	Time	Rank	Time	Rank
Georgios Sfaltos; Panagiotis Christakis; Alexandra Stamatopoulou; Chrysoula Antoniadou	4 × 50 m Freestyle Relay 20Pts	2:43.43	5 Q	2:39.35	5

== Wheelchair fencing ==
Men

Athlete	Event	Pool matches		Quarterfinals	Semifinals	Final / BM	
Athlete	Event	Opposition Score	Rank	Opposition Score	Opposition Score	Opposition Score	Rank
Gerasimos Pylarinos Markantonatos	Sabre A	Lemoine (FRA); L 1–5 Tian (CHN); L 0–5 Chan (HKG); L 2–5 Demchuk (UKR); L 4–5 Cheong (HKG); W 5–2	5	Did not advance			
Vasileios Ntounis	Sabre A	Chen (CHN); W 5–4 Tsedryk (UKR); W 5–3 Pellegrini (ITA); W 5–4 Noble (FRA); W 5–2 Osvath (HUN); W 5–2	1 Q	Chen (CHN); W 15–12	Osvath (HUN); L 12–15	Tian (CHN); L 5–15	4
Panagiotis Triantafyllou	Sabre B	Castro (POL); W 5–3 Mainville (CAN); W 5-1 Cheema (GER); W 5-4 Feng (CHN); W 5-1	1 Q	Mainville (CAN); W 15–6	Pluta (POL); W 15–14	Datsko (UKR); L 7–15	2nd place, silver medalist(s)
Gerasimos Pylarinos Markantonatos; Panagiotis Triantafyllou; Vasileios Ntounis	Team Épée	France (FRA); L 22-45 Brazil (BRA); W 45-32	2 Q	—N/a	China (CHN); L 33-45	Poland (POL); L 29-45	4

Women

Athlete	Event	Pool matches		Quarterfinals	Semifinals	Final / BM	
Athlete	Event	Opposition Score	Rank	Opposition Score	Opposition Score	Opposition Score	Rank
Kalliopi Loufaki	Épée B	Pozniak (UKR); L 1-2 Demaude (FRA); W 5-3 Makowska (POL); L 0-5 Briese-Baetke (GER); L 2-5 Yao (CHN); L 2-5	5	Did not advance			

== Wheelchair tennis ==
Stefanos Diamantis qualified for Rio in the men's singles event via a Bipartite Commission Invitation place.

Men

Athlete	Event	Round of 64	Round of 32	Round of 16	Quarterfinals	Semifinals	Final / BM	
Athlete	Event	Opposition Score	Opposition Score	Opposition Score	Opposition Score	Opposition Score	Opposition Score	Rank
Stefanos Diamantis	Men's singles	Jérémiasz (FRA); L 2-0 (0–6, 3–6)	Did not advance					

== See also ==
- Greece at the 2016 Summer Olympics
