= Greece at the 2004 Summer Paralympics =

- IPC code: GRE
- NPC: Hellenic Paralympic Committee
- Website: www.paralympic.gr

in Athens
- Competitors: 124 in 17 sports
- Flag bearer: Konstantinos Fykas
- Medals Ranked 34th: Gold 3 Silver 13 Bronze 4 Total 20

Summer Paralympics appearances (overview)
- 1976; 1980; 1984; 1988; 1992; 1996; 2000; 2004; 2008; 2012; 2016; 2020; 2024

Greece competed as the host nation of the 2004 Summer Paralympics in Athens, Greece. The team included 124 athletes, 107 men and 17 women. Competitors from Greece won 20 medals, including three gold, 13 silver and four bronze to finish 34th in the medal table.

== Medalists ==
Medal	Name	Sport	Event
Gold	Charalampos Taiganidis	Swimming	Men's 100 m backstroke S13
Gold	Charalampos Taiganidis	Swimming	Men's 100 m butterfly S13
Gold	Christos Tampaxis	Swimming	Men's 50 m backstroke S1
Silver	Christos Tampaxis	Swimming	Men's 50 m freestyle S1
Silver	Christos Tampaxis	Swimming	Men's 100 m freestyle S1
Silver	Anthi Karagianni	Athletics	Women's 100 m T13
Silver	Anthi Karagianni	Athletics	Women's 400 m T13
Silver	Anthi Karagianni	Athletics	Women's long jump F13
Silver	Konstantinos Fykas	Swimming	Men's 50 m freestyle S8
Silver	Konstantinos Fykas	Swimming	Men's 100 m freestyle S8
Silver	Maria Kalpakidou	Swimming	Women's 50 m backstroke S2
Silver	Maria Kalpakidou	Swimming	Women's 50 m freestyle S2
Silver	Charalampos Taiganidis	Swimming	Men's 50 m freestyle S13
Silver	Georgios Karaminas	Athletics	Men's shot put F52
Silver	Efthymios Kalaras	Athletics	Men's discus throw F54
Silver	Alexandros Taxildaris	Swimming	Men's 50 m backstroke S1
Bronze	Christos Angourakis	Athletics	Men's shot put F53
Bronze	Paraskevi Kantza	Athletics	Women's 100 m T11
Bronze	Georgios Kapellakis	Swimming	Men's 50 m backstroke S2
Bronze	Ioannis Kostakis	Swimming	Men's 100 m freestyle S3

== Sports ==
=== Archery ===
==== Men ====
Athlete	Event	Ranking round		Round of 32	Round of 16	Quarterfinals	Semifinals	Finals	
Athlete	Event	Score	Seed	Opposition score	Opposition score	Opposition score	Opposition score	Opposition score	Rank
Romaios Roumeliotis	Men's individual standing	469	22	Atamanenko (UKR); L 116-147	did not advance				

==== Women ====
Athlete	Event	Ranking round		Round of 32	Round of 16	Quarterfinals	Semifinals	Finals	
Athlete	Event	Score	Seed	Opposition score	Opposition score	Opposition score	Opposition score	Opposition score	Rank
Anna Tzika	Women's individual standing	549	7	—N/a	Wolak (POL); W 130-128	Wang (CHN); L 91-101	did not advance		

=== Athletics ===
==== Men's track ====
Athlete	Class	Event	Heats		Semifinal		Final	
Athlete	Class	Event	Result	Rank	Result	Rank	Result	Rank
Athanasios Barakas	T11	100m	12.56	19	did not advance			
Panagiotis Manetas	T36	100m	12.78	5 Q	—N/a		12.64	4
Panagiotis Manetas	T36	200m	—N/a				26.06	5
Aristotelis Marinos	T38	100m	11.89	5 Q	—N/a		11.70	4
Aristotelis Marinos	T38	200m	24.03	5 q	—N/a		23.61	5
Ioannis Protos	T13	100m	11.31	6 q	—N/a		11.35	6
Ioannis Protos	T13	200m	22.71	4 Q	—N/a		23.24	4
Stergios Sioutis	T11	Marathon	—N/a				3:47:11	12
Ioannis Stavridis	T11	Marathon	—N/a				3:49:26	13
Ioannis Stavridis	T12	100m	11.40	10 q	11.32	8 B	11.27	2
Ioannis Stavridis	T12	200m	23.70	18	did not advance			
Nikolaos Tsatsaklas	T11	Marathon	—N/a				3:44:39	11
Dimitrios Alexiou; Athansios Barakas; Loukas Kaskanis; Ioannis Protos; Ioannis Stavridis	T11-13	4 × 100 m relay	DNS		did not advance			

==== Men's field ====
Athlete	Class	Event	Final		
Athlete	Class	Event	Result	Points	Rank
Dimitrios Alexiou	F11	Long jump	5.85	-	6
Dimitrios Alexiou	F11	Triple jump	12.35	-	5
Panagiotis Angeletos	F36	Shot put	8.98	-	8
Christos Angourakis	F52-53	Javelin	15.99	835	14
Christos Angourakis	F53	Shot put	7.65	-	3rd place, bronze medalist(s)
Stefanos Anargyrou	F56	Shot put	10.34	-	8
Evangelos Bakolas	F33-34	Discus	16.86	-	9
Evangelos Bakolas	F33-34	Shot put	9.10	846	5
Athanasios Barakas	F11	Long jump	5.87	-	5
Athanasios Barakas	F11	Triple jump	11.39	-	8
Polychronis Chronopoulos	F52	Shot put	7.30	-	7
Athanasios Deligiorgis	F42	Discus	33.60	-	8
Athanasios Deligiorgis	F42	Shot put	12.42	-	4
Zacharias Fostiras	F52	Shot put	7.90	-	6
Efthymios Kalaras	F54	Discus	28.07	-	2nd place, silver medalist(s)
Georgios Karaminas	F52	Shot put	8.51	-	2nd place, silver medalist(s)
Georgios Karaminas	F52-53	Javelin	14.46	905	10
Loukas Kaskanis	F11	Javelin	DNS		
Loukas Kaskanis	F11	Shot put	11.65	-	5
Athanasios Koltsidas	F33-34	Shot put	9.06	944	6
Dimitrios Konstantagkas	F56	Shot put	11.05	-	5
Miltiadis Kyriakidis	F44/46	Shot put	13.26	912	8
Symeon Paltsanitidis	F55	Discus	30.53	-	5
Georgios Pappas	F44/46	Shot put	14.27	982	5
Miltiadis Stathopoulos	F44/46	High jump	1.80	-	6
Georgios Toptsis	F46	Triple jump	12.41	-	8
Gerasimos Vryonis	F52-53	Javelin	17.67	922	8
Gerasimos Vryonis	F53	Shot put	7.48	-	4

==== Women's track ====
Athlete	Class	Event	Heats		Semifinal		Final	
Athlete	Class	Event	Result	Rank	Result	Rank	Result	Rank
Paraskevi Kantza	T11	100m	13.33	4 q	13.32	4 q	13.34	3rd place, bronze medalist(s)
Paraskevi Kantza	T11	200m	28.57	5 Q	27.48	4 q	27.29	4
Anthi Karagianni	T13	100m	—N/a				12.87	2nd place, silver medalist(s)
Anthi Karagianni	T13	400m	—N/a				1:00.13	2nd place, silver medalist(s)
Eleni Samaritaki	T36	100m	—N/a				15.78	6
Eleni Samaritaki	T36	200m	—N/a				32.90	5

==== Women's field ====
Athlete	Class	Event	Final		
Athlete	Class	Event	Result	Points	Rank
Anthi Karagianni	F13	Long jump	5.29	-	2nd place, silver medalist(s)

=== Boccia ===
Athlete	Event	Preliminaries			Quarterfinals	Semifinals	Final	
Athlete	Event	Opponent	Opposition Score	Rank	Opposition Score	Opposition Score	Opposition Score	Rank
Maria Tsilikopoulou	Mixed individual BC2	Murray (GBR)	DNS	4	did not advance			
Maria Tsilikopoulou	Mixed individual BC2	Hayes (IRL)	DNS	4	did not advance			
Maria Tsilikopoulou	Mixed individual BC2	Femtegield (NOR)	L 2-5	4	did not advance			
Grigorios Polychronidis	Mixed individual BC3	Hanson (USA)	W 3-2	2 Q	Costa (POR); L 1-6	did not advance		
Grigorios Polychronidis	Mixed individual BC3	Macedo (POR)	W 7-2	2 Q	Costa (POR); L 1-6	did not advance		
Grigorios Polychronidis	Mixed individual BC3	Cronin (IRL)	W 4-1	2 Q	Costa (POR); L 1-6	did not advance		
Grigorios Polychronidis	Mixed individual BC3	Bidlas (CZE)	L 4-5	2 Q	Costa (POR); L 1-6	did not advance		
Anastasia Chatzipanagiotidou	Mixed individual BC4	Valentim (POR)	L 1-10	5	did not advance			
Anastasia Chatzipanagiotidou	Mixed individual BC4	Beres (HUN)	L 1-7	5	did not advance			
Anastasia Chatzipanagiotidou	Mixed individual BC4	Gomez (ESP)	L 2-5	5	did not advance			
Anastasia Chatzipanagiotidou	Mixed individual BC4	Gyurkota (HUN)	L 1-7	5	did not advance			
Emmanouil Mourtos	Mixed individual BC4	Dueso (ESP)	L 1-10	3	did not advance			
Emmanouil Mourtos	Mixed individual BC4	de Oliveria Pereira (POR)	L 3-10	3	did not advance			
Emmanouil Mourtos	Mixed individual BC4	Vandervies (CAN)	W 4-3	3	did not advance			
Emmanouil Mourtos	Mixed individual BC4	Ledesma (ARG)	W 9-1	3	did not advance			

=== Cycling ===
==== Men's road ====
Athlete	Event	Time	Rank
Loukas Anestis	Men's road race/time trial LC1	DNF	
Panagiotis Paterakis	Men's road race/time trial LC2	-	14
Symeon Triommatis; Christos Kalimeris (pilot)	Men's road race/time trial tandem B1-3	-	21

==== Men's track ====
Athlete	Event	Qualification		1st round		Final	
Athlete	Event	Time	Rank	Time	Rank	Opposition Time	Rank
Loukas Anestis	Men's 1km time trial LC1-4	—N/a				1:22.35	34
Loukas Anestis	Men's individual pursuit LC1	6:12.32	13	did not advance			
Panagiotis Paterakis	Men's 1km time trial LC1-4	—N/a				1:26.00	35
Panagiotis Paterakis	Men's individual pursuit LC2	DSQ		did not advance			
Symeon Triommatis; Christos Kalimeris (pilot)	Men's 1km time trial tandem B1-3	—N/a				1:16.71	19
Symeon Triommatis; Christos Kalimeris (pilot)	Men's individual pursuit tandem B1-3	5:29.86	18	did not advance			
Symeon Triommatis; Christos Kalimeris (pilot)	Men's sprint tandem B1-3	12.730	12	did not advance			

=== Equestrian ===
Athlete	Event	Total	
Athlete	Event	Score	Rank
Nikolaos Sigkas	Mixed individual championship test grade III	60.160	15
Nikolaos Sigkas	Mixed individual freestyle test grade III	61.278	14

=== Football 5-a-side ===
The men's football 5-a-side team did not win any medals. They were defeated by Spain in the bronze medal match.

==== Players ====
- Georgios Alikaniotis
- Dimitris Ampatzis
- Paschalis Ampatzis
- Angelis Aslanoglou
- Estratios Chatziapostolidis
- Christoforos Katsampalis
- Ioannis Papnikolaou
- Charalampos Tokatlidis
- Argyrios Triantafyllou
- Dimos Zacharos

==== Tournament ====
Game	Match	Score	Rank
1	Greece vs. Brazil (BRA)	0 - 4	4
2	Greece vs. Argentina (ARG)	1 - 2	4
3	Greece vs. Spain (ESP)	0 - 0	4
4	Greece vs. France (FRA)	2 - 2	4
5	Greece vs. South Korea (KOR)	3 - 1	4
Bronze medal final	Greece vs. Spain (ESP)	0 - 2	4

=== Goalball ===
The men's goalball team did not win any medals. They were 12th out of 12 teams.

==== Players ====
- Nikolaos Argyros
- Athanasios Chasiotis
- Nikolaos Chatzidafnis
- Antonios Diamantopoulos
- Sotirios Michalpoulos
- Anastasios Trikalitis

==== Men's tournament ====
Game	Match	Score	Rank
1	Greece vs. Denmark (DEN)	3 - 10	6
2	Greece vs. Sweden (SWE)	5 - 10	6
3	Greece vs. United States (USA)	1 - 11	6
4	Greece vs. Canada (CAN)	5 - 13	6
5	Greece vs. Germany (GER)	3 - 13	6
11th/12th classification	Greece vs. Slovenia (SLO)	2 - 12	12

The women's goalball team did not win any medals. They were knocked out in the preliminaries.

==== Players ====
- Antigoni Chatziapostolidou
- Vouziana Giota
- Styliani Iliopoulou
- Aikaterini Lorentzou
- Maria Tzalla
- Ioanna Zacharou

==== Women's tournament ====
Game	Match	Score	Rank
1	Greece vs. Canada (CAN)	0 - 8	8
2	Greece vs. United States (USA)	0 - 3	8
3	Greece vs. Japan (JPN)	1 - 2	8
4	Greece vs. Finland (FIN)	0 - 4	8
5	Greece vs. Netherlands (NED)	1 - 6	8
6	Greece vs. Germany (GER)	0 - 2	8
7	Greece vs. Brazil (BRA)	0 - 1	8

=== Judo ===
==== Men ====
Athlete	Event	Preliminary	Quarterfinals	Semifinals	Repechage round 1	Repechage round 2	Final/ Bronze medal contest
Athlete	Event	Opposition Result	Opposition Result	Opposition Result	Opposition Result	Opposition Result	Opposition Result
Theoklitos Papachristos	Men's 100kg	—N/a	Szott (USA); L 0010H-1000C	—N/a	Matsumoto (JPN); W 1001S-0001S	Le Meaux (FRA); L 0101K-0110S	Did not advance
Efstathios Soutios	Men's 66kg	Garcia del Valle (ESP); L 0000–1010	—N/a		Lee (KOR); L 0000-0010	did not advance	

==== Women ====
Athlete	Event	Quarterfinals	Semifinals	Repechage round 1	Final/ Bronze medal contest
Athlete	Event	Opposition Result	Opposition Result	Opposition Result	Opposition Result
Maria Keramida	Women's 57kg	—N/a	Payno (ESP); L 0000-1000	—N/a	Buzmakova (RUS); L 0000-1000
Christina Skandli	Women's 48kg	Medjeded (FRA); L 0001–1100	—N/a	Guo (CHN); L 0000-0220	Did not advance

=== Powerlifting ===
==== Men ====
Athlete	Event	Result	Rank
Dimitrios Anatolitis	82.5kg	190.0	7
Panagiotis Dimas	100kg	160.0	13
Vasileios Giannoukas	90kg	150.0	13
Nikolaos Gkountanis	67.5kg	165.0	6
Pavlos Mamalos	90kg	207.5	6
Gkremislav Moysiadis	60kg	165.0	4

==== Women ====
Athlete	Event	Result	Rank
Anastasia Kazantzidou	67.5kg	85.0	5

=== Shooting ===
==== Men ====
Athlete	Event	Qualification		Final		
Athlete	Event	Score	Rank	Score	Total	Rank
Panagiotis Giannoukaris	Mixed 10m air rifle prone SH2	588	25	did not advance		
Panagiotis Giannoukaris	Mixed 10m air rifle standing SH2	590	16	did not advance		

==== Women ====
Athlete	Event	Qualification		Final		
Athlete	Event	Score	Rank	Score	Total	Rank
Georgia Dimopoulou	Women's 10m air rifle standing SH1	355	18	did not advance		

=== Swimming ===
==== Men ====
Athlete	Class	Event	Heats		Final	
Athlete	Class	Event	Result	Rank	Result	Rank
Konstantinos Fykas	S8	50m freestyle	27.97	2 Q	27.54	2nd place, silver medalist(s)
Konstantinos Fykas	S8	100m freestyle	1:01.74	2 Q	1:00.37	2nd place, silver medalist(s)
Konstantinos Fykas	S8	400m freestyle	DNS		did not advance	
Konstantinos Fykas	S8	100m butterfly	DSQ		did not advance	
Konstantinos Fykas	SB8	100m breaststroke	1:22.69	7 Q	1:23.72	7
Georgios Kapellakis	S2	50m freestyle	1:14.28	5 Q	1:14.41	5
Georgios Kapellakis	S2	100m freestyle	2:52.56	9	did not advance	
Georgios Kapellakis	S2	200m freestyle	5:43.88	6 Q	5:49.36	8
Georgios Kapellakis	S2	50m backstroke	1:17.98	7 Q	1:11.46	3rd place, bronze medalist(s)
Nikolaos Kaplanis	S2	50m freestyle	1:22.69	11	did not advance	
Nikolaos Kaplanis	S2	100m freestyle	3:16.24	12	did not advance	
Nikolaos Kaplanis	S2	50m backstroke	1:24.43	11	did not advance	
Ioannis Kostakis	S3	50m freestyle	55.42	7 Q	54.40	7
Ioannis Kostakis	S3	100m freestyle	1:55.41	2 Q	1:55.79	3rd place, bronze medalist(s)
Ioannis Kostakis	S3	200m freestyle	4:08.87	2 Q	4:08.07	4
Ioannis Kostakis	SB2	50m breaststroke	1:14.53	8 Q	1:11.42	7
Ioannis Kostakis	SM3	150m individual medley	3:46.83	8 Q	3:39.78	8
Antonios Kymoundris	S2	50m freestyle	1:26.28	12	did not advance	
Antonios Kymoundris	S2	100m freestyle	3:00.09	11	did not advance	
Antonios Kymoundris	S2	200m freestyle	5:55.40	8 Q	5:42.32	7
Antonios Kymoundris	S2	50m backstroke	1:21.99	10	did not advance	
Georgios Papadimitriou	S3	50m backstroke	1:13.63	10	did not advance	
Georgios Papadimitriou	SB2	50m breaststroke	1:24.26	9	did not advance	
Charalampos Taiganidis	S13	50m freestyle	24.90	1 Q	24.97	2nd place, silver medalist(s)
Charalampos Taiganidis	S13	100m backstroke	1:03.43 WR	1 Q	1:03.98	1st place, gold medalist(s)
Charalampos Taiganidis	S13	100m butterfly	1:01.36	1 Q	1:01.50	1st place, gold medalist(s)
Christos Tampaxis	S1	50m freestyle	N/A		1:31.00	2nd place, silver medalist(s)
Christos Tampaxis	S1	100m freestyle	N/A		2:56.64	2nd place, silver medalist(s)
Christos Tampaxis	S1	50m backstroke	N/A		1:22.20 PR	1st place, gold medalist(s)
Alexandros Taxildaris	S1	50m freestyle	N/A		1:55.91	5
Alexandros Taxildaris	S1	100m freestyle	N/A		3:48.41	4
Alexandros Taxildaris	S1	50m backstroke	N/A		1:42.34	2nd place, silver medalist(s)
Stylianos Tsakonas	S4	200m freestyle	3:46.12	10	did not advance	
Stylianos Tsakonas	S4	50m backstroke	55.08	10	did not advance	
Fotios Zafeiris	S4	50m freestyle	44.77	7 Q	44.87	8
Fotios Zafeiris	S4	100m freestyle	1:46.95	10	did not advance	

==== Women ====
Athlete	Class	Event	Heats		Final	
Athlete	Class	Event	Result	Rank	Result	Rank
Maria Kalpakidou	S2	50m freestyle	N/A		1:28.70	2nd place, silver medalist(s)
Maria Kalpakidou	S2	100m freestyle	N/A		3:19.24	4
Maria Kalpakidou	S2	50m backstroke	N/A		1:28.30	2nd place, silver medalist(s)

=== Table tennis ===
==== Men ====
Athlete	Event	Preliminaries				Quarterfinals	Semifinals	Final / BM	
Athlete	Event	Opposition Result	Opposition Result	Opposition Result	Rank	Opposition Result	Opposition Result	Opposition Result	Rank
Antonio Kalyvas	Men's singles 5	Robles (ESP); L 0-3	Bolldén (SWE); L 0-3	Nilsen (RSA); L 0-3	4	did not advance			
Polychronis Politsis	Men's singles 6	Arnold (GER); L 1-3	Hassan (EGY); L 2-3	Kersten (NED); L 1-3	4	did not advance			
Konstantinos Siachos	Men's singles 3	Kesler (SCG); L 0–3	Kramminger (AUT); L 0–3	Glazar (CZE); L 0–3	4	did not advance			
Antonios Kalyvas; Konstantinos Siachos	Men's teams 5	Chinese Taipei (TPE); L 0-3	Sweden (SWE); L 0-3	—N/a	3	did not advance			

=== Volleyball ===
The men's volleyball team did not win any medals. They were 8th out of 8 teams.

==== Players ====
- Marinos Anagnostopoulos
- Emmanouil Drakonakis
- Christos Konstantakopoulos
- Anastasios Kostaris
- Eleftherios Lamprakis
- Kyriakos Makris
- Nikolaos Mallios
- Ioannis Somos
- Ioannis Soukiouroglou
- Emmanouil Touloupakis
- Panagiotis Vakondios
- Georgios Zafeiropoulos

==== Men's tournament ====
Game	Match	Score	Rank
1	Greece vs. Bosnia and Herzegovina (BIH)	0 - 3	4
2	Greece vs. Egypt (EGY)	0 - 3	4
3	Greece vs. United States (USA)	1 - 3	4
Quarterfinals	Greece vs. Iran (IRI)	0 - 3	L
Semifinals	Greece vs. Finland (FIN)	0 - 3	L
7th/8th classification	Greece vs. Japan (JPN)	1 - 3	8

=== Wheelchair basketball ===
The men's team did not win any medals. They were 12th out of 12 teams.

==== Players ====
- Michalis Chatzidimitriou
- Panagiotis Chrisovergis
- Angelos Dimpitouzis
- Georgios Echlert
- Vaios Gioras
- Georgios Kounias
- Nikolaos Loulas
- Athanasios Maltas
- Georgios Petrakis
- Michalis Stergiopoulous
- Periklis Tsapanidis
- Angelos Tsiakiris

==== Men's tournament ====
Game	Match	Score	Rank
1	Greece vs. Netherlands (NED)	34 - 95	6
2	Greece vs. United States (USA)	27 - 85	6
3	Greece vs. Germany (GER)	39 - 101	6
4	Greece vs. Japan (JPN)	32 - 73	6
5	Greece vs. Iran (IRI)	33 - 81	6
11th/12th classification	Greece vs. France (FRA)	55 - 78	12

=== Wheelchair fencing ===
Athlete	Event	Qualification			Round of 16	Quarterfinal	Semifinal	Final / BM	
Athlete	Event	Opposition	Score	Rank	Opposition Score	Opposition Score	Opposition Score	Opposition Score	Rank
Emmanouil Bogdos	Men's foil B	Czop (POL)	L 0-5	5	did not advance				
Emmanouil Bogdos	Men's foil B	Latreche (FRA)	L 2-5	5	did not advance				
Emmanouil Bogdos	Men's foil B	Moreno (USA)	L 0-5	5	did not advance				
Emmanouil Bogdos	Men's foil B	Sarri (ITA)	L 0-5	5	did not advance				
Emmanouil Bogdos	Men's sabre B	Wysmierski (POL)	L 2-5	6 Q	Szekeres (HUN); L 7-15	did not advance			
Emmanouil Bogdos	Men's sabre B	Durand (FRA)	L 3-5	6 Q	Szekeres (HUN); L 7-15	did not advance			
Emmanouil Bogdos	Men's sabre B	Mayer (GER)	L 2-5	6 Q	Szekeres (HUN); L 7-15	did not advance			
Emmanouil Bogdos	Men's sabre B	Szekeres (HUN)	L 1-5	6 Q	Szekeres (HUN); L 7-15	did not advance			
Emmanouil Bogdos	Men's sabre B	Heaton (GBR)	L 1-5	6 Q	Szekeres (HUN); L 7-15	did not advance			
Emmanouil Bogdos	Men's sabre B	Shumate (USA)	W 5-1	6 Q	Szekeres (HUN); L 7-15	did not advance			
Nikolaos Peppas	Men's épée A	Al Qallaf (KUW)	L 1–5	6	did not advance				
Nikolaos Peppas	Men's épée A	Lipinski (GER)	L 2-5	6	did not advance				
Nikolaos Peppas	Men's épée A	Jablonski (POL)	L 2-5	6	did not advance				
Nikolaos Peppas	Men's épée A	Tai (HKG)	L 1-5	6	did not advance				
Nikolaos Peppas	Men's épée A	More (FRA)	L 1-5	6	did not advance				
Nikolaos Peppas	Men's épée A	Rodriguez (ESP)	W 5-4	6	did not advance				
Nikolaos Peppas	Men's foil A	Pender (POL)	L 2-5	4 Q	Fung (HKG); L 0-15	did not advance			
Nikolaos Peppas	Men's foil A	Kwong (HKG)	L 0-5	4 Q	Fung (HKG); L 0-15	did not advance			
Nikolaos Peppas	Men's foil A	Citerne (FRA)	W 5-4	4 Q	Fung (HKG); L 0-15	did not advance			
Nikolaos Peppas	Men's foil A	Rodriguez (USA)	W 5-4	4 Q	Fung (HKG); L 0-15	did not advance			

=== Wheelchair tennis ===
==== Men ====
Athlete	Class	Event	Round of 64	Round of 32	Round of 16	Quarterfinals	Semifinals	Finals
Athlete	Class	Event	Opposition Result	Opposition Result	Opposition Result	Opposition Result	Opposition Result	Opposition Result
Konstantinos Vazouras	Open	Men's singles	Bonaccurso (AUS); L 1-6, 0-6	did not advance				

== See also ==
- Greece at the Paralympics
- Greece at the 2004 Summer Olympics
