= Greece at the 2008 Summer Paralympics =

- IPC code: GRE
- NPC: Hellenic Paralympic Committee
- Website: www.paralympic.gr

in Beijing
- Competitors: 69 in 11 sports
- Flag bearer: Charalampos Taiganidis
- Medals Ranked 20th: Gold 5 Silver 9 Bronze 10 Total 24

Summer Paralympics appearances (overview)
- 1976; 1980; 1984; 1988; 1992; 1996; 2000; 2004; 2008; 2012; 2016; 2020; 2024

Greece competed at the 2008 Summer Paralympics in Beijing, People's Republic of China. The national team of Greece was composed of 69 athletes, 53 men and 16 women, who competed in 11 sports, archery, athletics, boccia, cycling, judo, powerlifting, sailing, shooting, swimming, wheelchair fencing, wheelchair tennis. Contrary to the tradition in the Summer Olympic Games, Greece did not enter first during the parade of nations at the opening ceremony but 69th in name order in Chinese, with the swimmer Charalampos Taiganidis being the team's flag bearer.

== Medalists ==
| Medal | Name | Sport | Event |
|---|---|---|---|
| Gold | Charalampos Taiganidis | Swimming | Men's 100 m freestyle S13 |
| Gold | Georgios Kapellakis | Swimming | Men's 50 m freestyle S2 |
| Gold | Charalampos Taiganidis | Swimming | Men's 100 m backstroke S13 |
| Gold | Paschalis Stathelakos | Athletics | Men's shot put F40 |
| Gold | Christos Tampaxis | Swimming | Men's 50 metre backstroke S1 |
| Silver | Georgios Kapellakis | Swimming | Men's 100 m freestyle S2 |
| Silver | Alexandra Dimoglou | Athletics | Women's 400 m T13 |
| Silver | Anthi Karagianni | Athletics | Women's long jump F13 |
| Silver | Grigorios Polychronidis | Boccia | Mixed individual BC3 |
| Silver | Charalampos Taiganidis | Swimming | Men's 100 m butterfly S13 |
| Silver | Charalampos Taiganidis | Swimming | Men's 200 m individual medley SM13 |
| Silver | Pavlos Mamalos | Powerlifting | Men's 82.50 kg |
| Silver | Andreas Katsaros | Swimming | Men's 50 metre backstroke S1 |
| Silver | Charalampos Taiganidis | Swimming | Men's 50 m freestyle S13 |
| Bronze | Georgios Kapellakis | Swimming | Men's 200 m freestyle S2 |
| Bronze | Ioannis Protos | Athletics | Men's 400 m T13 |
| Bronze | Charalampos Taiganidis | Swimming | Men's 400 m freestyle S13 |
| Bronze | Anastasios Tsiou | Athletics | Men's shot put F57/58 |
| Bronze | Alexandra Dimoglou | Athletics | Women's 200 m T13 |
| Bronze | Athanasios Barakas | Athletics | Men's long jump F11 |
| Bronze | Maria Stamatoula | Athletics | Women's shot put F32-34/52/53 |
| Bronze | Georgios Kapellakis | Swimming | Men's 50 metre backstroke S2 |
| Bronze | Che Jon Fernandes | Athletics | Men's shot put F53/54 |
| Bronze | Alexandra Dimoglou | Athletics | Women's 100 m T13 |

Medals by sport
| Sport | 1st place, gold medalist(s) | 2nd place, silver medalist(s) | 3rd place, bronze medalist(s) | Total |
| Swimming | 4 | 5 | 3 | 12 |
| Athletics | 1 | 2 | 7 | 10 |
| Boccia | 0 | 1 | 0 | 1 |
| Powerlifting | 0 | 1 | 0 | 1 |
| Total | 5 | 9 | 10 | 24 |

=== Multiple medallists ===
The following Greek athletes won multiple medals at the 2008 Paralympic Games.

| Name | Medal | Sport | Events |
|---|---|---|---|
| Charalampos Taiganidis | Gold; Gold; Silver; Silver; Silver; Bronze | Swimming | Men's 100 m freestyle S13; Men's 100 m backstroke S13; Men's 100 m butterfly S13; Men's 200 m individual medley SM13; Men's 50 m freestyle S13; Men's 400 m freestyle S13 |
| Georgios Kapellakis | Gold; Silver; Bronze; Bronze | Swimming | Men's 50 m freestyle S2; Men's 100 m freestyle S2; Men's 200 m freestyle S2; Men's 50 m backstroke S2 |
| Alexandra Dimoglou | Silver; Bronze; Bronze | Athletics | Women's 400 m T13; Women's 200 m T13; Women's 100 m T13 |

== Archery ==
Men

| Athlete | Event | Ranking round | | Round of 32 | Round of 16 | Quarterfinals | Semifinals | Finals | |
| Athlete | Event | Score | Rank | Opposition Result | Opposition Result | Opposition Result | Opposition Result | Opposition Result | Rank |
|---|---|---|---|---|---|---|---|---|---|
| Romaios Roumeliotis | Individual recurve - Standing | 475 | 24 | Zarzuela (ESP); L 90-97 | did not advance | | | | |

Women

| Athlete | Event | Ranking round | | Round of 32 | Round of 16 | Quarterfinals | Semifinals | Finals | |
| Athlete | Event | Score | Rank | Opposition Result | Opposition Result | Opposition Result | Opposition Result | Opposition Result | Rank |
|---|---|---|---|---|---|---|---|---|---|
| Anna Tzika | Individual recurve - Standing | 550 | 10 | BYE | Byambasuren (MGL); W 90-85 | Gao (CHN); L 83-106 | did not advance | | |

== Boccia ==
| Athlete | Event | Match 1 | Match 2 | Match 3 | Rank | Quarterfinals | Semifinals | Final | |
| Athlete | Event | Opposition Result | Opposition Result | Opposition Result | Rank | Opposition Result | Opposition Result | Opposition Result | Rank |
|---|---|---|---|---|---|---|---|---|---|
| Dimitrios Michos | Individual BC3 | Pesquera (ESP); L 0-14 | Kabush (CAN); L 1-6 | Raimundo (POR); L 1-5 | 4 | did not advance | | | |
| Grigorios Polychronidis | Individual BC3 | Zhu (CHN); W 11-1 | Dijkstra (NZL); W 19-0 | Sukkarath (THA); W 7-0 | 1 Q | Gauthier (CAN); W 6-3 | Jeong (KOR); W 4-1 | Park (KOR); L 2-3 | Silver medal |
| Maria Stavropoulou | Individual BC3 | Gauthier (CAN); L 1-9 | Costa (POR); L 3-5 | Martin (ESP); L 2-11 | 4 | did not advance | | | |
| Dimitrios Michos; Grigorios Polychronidis; Maria Stavropoulou | Pairs BC3 | Thailand (THA); L 2-5 | Portugal (POR); L 2-5 | New Zealand (NZL); D 2-2 | 4 | did not advance | | | |

== Cycling ==
=== Road ===
| Athlete | Event | Time | Rank |
|---|---|---|---|
| Ioannis Kalaitzakis | Men's time trial LC1 | 41:13.72 | 16 |
| Ioannis Kalaitzakis | Men's road race LC1/LC2/CPA | 2:02.21 | 29 |
| Stamatios Kotzias | Mixed time trial CP1/CP2 | 27:02.61 | 10 |
| Stamatios Kotzias | Mixed road race CP1/CP2 | 50.09 | 6 |

=== Track ===
Men

| Athlete | Event | Heats | | Semifinals | | Final | |
| Athlete | Event | Time | Rank | Time | Rank | Time | Rank |
|---|---|---|---|---|---|---|---|
| Ioannis Kalaitzakis | Individual pursuit (LC 1) | 5:20.026 | 15 | | | did not advance | |
| Ioannis Kalaitzakis | 1 km time trial (LC 1) | | | | | 1:16.450 | 12 |

== Judo ==
Men

| Athlete | Event | Round of 16 | Quarterfinals | Semifinals | Final | Repechage 1 | Repechage 2 | Bronze | Rank |
| Athlete | Event | Opposition Result | Opposition Result | Opposition Result | Opposition Result | Opposition Result | Opposition Result | Opposition Result | Rank |
|---|---|---|---|---|---|---|---|---|---|
| Theoklitos Papachristos | +100 kg | | Papp (HUN); L 0001-1001 | did not advance | | Parasyuk (RUS); L 0000-0001 | did not advance | | |

Women

| Athlete | Event | Round of 16 | Quarterfinals | Semifinals | Final | Repechage 1 | Repechage 2 | Bronze | Rank |
| Athlete | Event | Opposition Result | Opposition Result | Opposition Result | Opposition Result | Opposition Result | Opposition Result | Opposition Result | Rank |
|---|---|---|---|---|---|---|---|---|---|
| Maria Keramida | -57 kg | | Karkar (ALG); L 0000-0010 | did not advance | | Cete (TUR); W 1000-0010 | Merenciano (ESP); L 0002-0010 | Did not advance | 5 |

== Powerlifting ==
Men

| Athlete | Event | Total lifted | Rank |
|---|---|---|---|
| Nikolaos Gkountanis | -75 kg | 190.0 kg | 7 |
| Pavlos Mamalos | -82.50 kg | 225.0 kg | Silver medal |
| Gkremislav Moysiadis | -67.50 kg | 187.5 kg | 5 |

Women

| Athlete | Event | Total lifted | Rank |
|---|---|---|---|
| Anastasia Kazantzidou | -67.50 kg | 87.5 kg | 7 |

== Sailing ==
| Athlete | Event | Race | | | | | | | | | | | Score | Rank |
| Athlete | Event | 1 | 2 | 3 | 4 | 5 | 6 | 7 | 8 | 9 | 10 | 11 | Score | Rank |
|---|---|---|---|---|---|---|---|---|---|---|---|---|---|---|
| Georgios Delikouras | 1P keelboat (2.4MR) | ~~15~~ | 13 | 9 | 3 | 13 | ~~14~~ | 7 | 14 | 12 | 8 | | 79 | 13 |
| Vasileios Christoforou; Theodoros Alexas; Nikolaos Paterakis | 3P keelboat (Sonar) | 2 | 5 | 7 | 5 | ~~8~~ | 2 | 4 | ~~9~~ | 2 | 6 | 8 | 41 | 7 |

== Shooting ==
| Athlete | Event | Qualification | | Final | |
| Athlete | Event | Score | Rank | Score | Rank |
|---|---|---|---|---|---|
| Panagiotis Giannoukaris | Mixed R5-10M air rifle prone SH2 | 597 | 16 | did not advance | |
| Evangelos Kakosaios | Mixed R5-10M air rifle prone SH2 | 597 | 14 | did not advance | |
| Eleni Zampoura | Women's P2-10M air pistol SH1 | 360 | 9 | did not advance | |

== Swimming ==
Men

| Athlete | Events | Heat | | Final | |
| Athlete | Events | Time | Rank | Time | Rank |
|---|---|---|---|---|---|
| Konstantinos Fykas | S8 100 m freestyle | 1:00.96 | 6 Q | 1:01.40 | 7 |
| Konstantinos Fykas | S8 50 m freestyle | DSQ | | did not advance | |
| Georgios Kapellakis | S2 200 m freestyle | 5:12.99 | 2 Q | 5:05.91 | Bronze medal |
| Georgios Kapellakis | S2 100 m freestyle | 2:31.97 | 3 Q | 2:23.63 | Silver medal |
| Georgios Kapellakis | S2 50 m freestyle | 1:11.02 | 3 Q | 1:04.85 | Gold medal |
| Konstantinos Karaouzas | SB3 100 m breaststroke | 56.71 | 6 Q | 54.47 | 4 |
| Ioannis Kostakis | S3 100 m freestyle | 1:52.89 | 3 Q | 1:45.72 | 4 |
| Ioannis Kostakis | S3 200 m freestyle | | | 3:38.42 | 4 |
| Ioannis Kostakis | S3 50 m freestyle | 49.87 | 2 Q | 49.84 | 5 |
| Charalampos Taiganidis | S13 100 m butterfly | 1:00.52 | 2 Q | 59.20 | Silver medal |
| Charalampos Taiganidis | S13 400 m freestyle | 4:31.17 | 6 Q | 4:23.59 | Bronze medal |
| Charalampos Taiganidis | S13 100 m freestyle | 54.96 | 2 Q | 53.37 | Gold medal |
| Charalampos Taiganidis | SM13 200 m individual medley | 2:24.19 | 7 Q | 2:16.95 | Silver medal |
| Charalampos Taiganidis | S13 100 m backstroke | 1:03.02 | 1 Q | 59.85 | Gold medal |
| Christos Tampaxis | S2 100 m freestyle | 2:53.19 | 10 | did not advance | |
| Christos Tampaxis | S2 50 m freestyle | 1:20.84 | 9 | did not advance | |
| Vasileios Tsagkaris | SB3 100 m breaststroke | 56.04 | 5 Q | 55.91 | 6 |
| Stylianos Tsakonas | S4 100 m freestyle | 1:40.63 | 9 | did not advance | |
| Stylianos Tsakonas | S4 50 m backstroke | 51.04 | 6 Q | 51.15 | 6 |
| Stylianos Tsakonas | S4 200 m freestyle | 3:43.87 | 8 Q | 3:40.20 | 8 |
| Stylianos Tsakonas | SM4 150 m individual medley | 3:00.27 | 7 Q | 2:57.99 | 7 |
| Nikolaos Tsotras | S7 100 m freestyle | 1:10.07 | 9 | did not advance | |
| Nikolaos Tsotras | S7 100 m backstroke | 1:21.52 | 10 | did not advance | |
| Nikolaos Tsotras | S7 50 m freestyle | 31.41 | 7 Q | 31.01 | 5 |
| Ioannis Kostakis; Stylianos Tsakonas; Konstantinos Karaouzas; Nikolaos Tsotras | 20 pts 4x50 m freestyle | | | 2:57.98 | 4 |

Women

| Athlete | Events | Heat | | Final | |
| Athlete | Events | Time | Rank | Time | Rank |
|---|---|---|---|---|---|
| Maria Kalpakidou | S3 50 m freestyle | 1:25.39 | 12 | did not advance | |
| Maria Liaskou | S3 50 m freestyle | 1:29.31 | 14 | did not advance | |

== Tennis ==
Men

| Athlete | Event | Round of 64 | Round of 32 | Round of 16 | Quarterfinals | Semifinals | Finals | |
| Athlete | Event | Opposition Result | Opposition Result | Opposition Result | Opposition Result | Opposition Result | Opposition Result | Rank |
|---|---|---|---|---|---|---|---|---|
| Georgios Lazaridis | Singles - Open | Majdi (FRA); L 0-6 0-6 | did not advance | | | | | |

== Wheelchair fencing ==
Men

| Athlete | Event | Preliminary Round | | Round of 16 | Quarterfinals | Semifinals | Final |
| Athlete | Event | Opposition Score | Rank | Opposition Score | Opposition Score | Opposition Score | Opposition Score |
|---|---|---|---|---|---|---|---|
| Pylarinos Markantonatos | Épée A | Alhaddad (KUW); L 3-5; Serafini (ITA); W 5-2; Saengsawang (THA); W 5-1; Sanchez (ESP); W 5-3; Davydenko (UKR); L 4-5; Maillard (FRA); W 5-4 | 2 Q | Betti (ITA); L 12-15 | did not advance | | |
| Emmanouil Bogdos | Épée B | Alsaedi (KUW); W 5-4; Latreche (FRA); L 3-5; Williams (USA); L 4-5; Poleshchuk (RUS); W 5-2; Komar (UKR); L 2-5 | 5 Q | Bezyazynchny (BLR); L 7-15 | did not advance | | |

== See also ==
- Greece at the 2008 Summer Olympics
