= Greece at the 2012 Summer Paralympics =

- IPC code: GRE
- NPC: Hellenic Paralympic Committee
- Website: www.paralympic.gr

in London
- Competitors: 61 in 9 sports
- Flag bearer: Christos Tampaxis
- Medals Ranked 44th: Gold 1 Silver 3 Bronze 8 Total 12

Summer Paralympics appearances (overview)
- 1976; 1980; 1984; 1988; 1992; 1996; 2000; 2004; 2008; 2012; 2016; 2020; 2024

Greece competed at the 2012 Summer Paralympics in London, United Kingdom, from August 29 to September 9, 2012. The Hellenic Paralympic Committee sent a total of 61 athletes, 47 men and 14 women, to compete in 9 sports. Greece finished 44th in the medal table, winning one gold medal and 12 in total.

== Medalists ==
Medal	Name	Sport	Event	Date
Gold	Grigorios Polychronidis; Nikolaos Pananos; Maria-Eleni Kordali	Boccia	Mixed pairs BC3	September 4
Silver	Paschalis Stathelakos	Athletics	Men's discus throw F40	September 4
Silver	Aristeidis Makrodimitris	Swimming	Men's 50 metre backstroke S2	September 5
Silver	Christos Tampaxis	Swimming	Men's 50 metre backstroke S1	September 6
Bronze	Aristeidis Makrodimitris	Swimming	Men's 100 metre freestyle S2	September 3
Bronze	Alexandra Dimoglou	Athletics	Women's 400 metres T13	September 3
Bronze	Charalampos Taiganidis	Swimming	Men's 100 metre backstroke S13	September 3
Bronze	Pavlos Mamalos	Powerlifting	Men's 90 kg	September 4
Bronze	Paschalis Stathelakos	Athletics	Men's shot put F40	September 6
Bronze	Aristeidis Makrodimitris	Swimming	Men's 50 metre freestyle S2	September 7
Bronze	Anthi Karagianni	Athletics	Women's long jump F13	September 7
Bronze	Manolis Stefanoudakis	Athletics	Men's javelin throw F54/55/56	September 8

=== Multiple medallists ===
The following Greek athletes won multiple medals at the 2012 Paralympic Games.

Name	Medal	Sport	Events
Aristeidis Makrodimitris	Silver; Bronze; Bronze	Swimming	Men's 50 metre backstroke S2; Men's 100 metre freestyle S2; Men's 50 metre freestyle S2
Paschalis Stathelakos	Silver; Bronze	Athletics	Men's discus throw F40; Men's shot put F40

Medals by sport
Sport	1st place, gold medalist(s)	2nd place, silver medalist(s)	3rd place, bronze medalist(s)	Total
Boccia	1	0	0	1
Swimming	0	2	3	5
Athletics	0	1	4	5
Powerlifting	0	0	1	1
Total	1	3	8	12

Medals by day
Day	Date	1st place, gold medalist(s)	2nd place, silver medalist(s)	3rd place, bronze medalist(s)	Total
1	Aug 30	0	0	0	0
2	Aug 31	0	0	0	0
3	Sep 1	0	0	0	0
4	Sep 2	0	0	0	0
5	Sep 3	0	0	3	3
6	Sep 4	1	1	1	3
7	Sep 5	0	1	0	1
8	Sep 6	0	1	1	2
9	Sep 7	0	0	2	2
10	Sep 8	0	0	1	1
11	Sep 9	0	0	0	0
Total		1	3	8	12

== Archery ==
Women

Athlete	Event	Ranking round		Round of 32	Round of 16	Quarterfinals	Semifinals	Finals	
Athlete	Event	Score	Seed	Opposition score	Opposition score	Opposition score	Opposition score	Opposition score	Rank
Anna Tzika	Ind. recurve Standing	498	13	Bye	Lee (KOR); L 0-6	did not advance			

== Athletics ==
Men
Track events

Athlete	Event	Heat		Semifinal		Final	
Athlete	Event	Result	Rank	Result	Rank	Result	Rank
Ioannis Protos	200 m T13	22.70	3 q	—N/a		22.97	8
Ioannis Protos	400 m T13	50.73	2 Q	—N/a		49.67	4

Field events

Athlete	Event	Heat		Semifinal		Final	
Athlete	Event	Result	Rank	Result	Rank	Result	Rank
Athanasios Barakas	Long jump F11	—N/a				5.41	10
Athanasios Barakas	Triple jump F11	—N/a				11.67	6
Konstantinos Dibidis	Shot put F20	—N/a				12.79	8
Che Jon Fernandes	Shot put F52/53	—N/a				7.36	6
Marinos Fylachtos	Discus throw F42	—N/a				41.63 PB	4
Pantelis Kalogeros	Discus throw F51/52/53	—N/a				10.06 PB	7
Evangelos Kanavos	Long jump F20	—N/a				6.25	6
Nikolaos Kaplanis	Club throw F31/32/51	—N/a				18.82	16
Nikolaos Kaplanis	Discus throw F51/52/53	—N/a				NM	–
Georgios Karaminas	Javelin throw F52/53	—N/a				15.37	5
Georgios Karaminas	Shot put F52/53	—N/a				NM	–
Alexandros Michail Konstantinidis	Discus throw F40	—N/a				37.59	6
Alexandros Michail Konstantinidis	Shot put F40	—N/a				10.38	10
Ilias Nalmpantis	Discus throw F54/55/56	—N/a				31.37 PB	10
Ilias Nalmpantis	Shot put F54/55/56	—N/a				10.72	6
Efstratios Nikolaidis	Shot put F20	—N/a				14.51 PB	4
Angim Dimitrios Ntomgkioni	Javelin throw F57/58	—N/a				32.97	13
Angim Dimitrios Ntomgkioni	Shot put F57/58	—N/a				12.25	9
Anastasios Petropoulos	Long jump F36	—N/a				4.90 PB	7
Paschalis Stathelakos	Discus throw F40	—N/a				44.11 RR	2nd place, silver medalist(s)
Paschalis Stathelakos	Shot put F40	—N/a				12.78	3rd place, bronze medalist(s)
Manolis Stefanoudakis	Javelin throw F54/55/56	—N/a				27.37	3rd place, bronze medalist(s)
Manolis Stefanoudakis	Shot put F54/55/56	—N/a				7.91	17
Athanasios Tsiou	Javelin throw F57/58	—N/a				27.85	15
Athanasios Tsiou	Shot put F57/58	—N/a				12.64	8
Gerasimos Vryonis	Javelin throw F52/53	—N/a				15.50	9
Gerasimos Vryonis	Shot put F52/53	—N/a				NM	–
Dimitrios Zisidis	Shot put F32/33	—N/a				7.48	8

Women
Track events

Athlete	Event	Heat		Semifinal		Final	
Athlete	Event	Result	Rank	Result	Rank	Result	Rank
Alexandra Dimoglou	100 m T13	12.76	2 Q	—N/a		12.53 PB	4
Alexandra Dimoglou	400 m T13	—N/a				56.91 PB	3rd place, bronze medalist(s)
Paraskevi Kantza	200 m T11	28.10 PB	3 q	27.57 PB	4	did not advance	
Anthi Karagianni	100 m T13	13.16	4 q	—N/a		13.23	7
Styliani Smaragdi	100 m T46	13.94	4 q	—N/a		14.01	7

Field events

Athlete	Event	Heat		Semifinal		Final	
Athlete	Event	Result	Rank	Result	Rank	Result	Rank
Paraskevi Kantza	Long jump F11/12	—N/a				3.97	8
Anthi Karagianni	Long jump F13	—N/a				5.16	3rd place, bronze medalist(s)
Styliani Smaragdi	Long jump F46	—N/a				4.68	6
Maria Stamatoula	Club throw F31/32/51	—N/a				16.68	6
Maria Stamatoula	Shot put F32/33/34	—N/a				5.66	5
Evangelia Ziska	Shot put F20	—N/a				9.76	9

== Boccia ==
Individual

Athlete	Event	Seeding	Round of 32	Round of 16	Quarterfinals	Classification matches 5-8		Semifinals	Final	
Athlete	Event	Opposition Result	Opposition Result	Opposition Result	Opposition Result	Opposition Result	Opposition Result	Opposition Result	Opposition Result	Rank
Nikolaos Pananos	Mixed individual BC3	BYE	Choi (KOR); L 0-10	did not advance						
Alexandros Papadakis	Mixed individual BC2	Kral (SVK); L 5-5	Martin Perez (ESP); L 3-4	did not advance						
Grigorios Polychronidis	Mixed individual BC3	BYE	BYE	Thomas (GBR); W 5-1	Choi (KOR); L 2-7	Costa (POR); W 4-1	de Laender (BEL); W 3-3	did not advance		5
Panagiotis Soulanis	Mixed individual BC1	Aandalen (NOR); L 3-3	BYE	Kim (KOR); L 0-5	did not advance					

Pairs and Teams

Athlete	Event	Pool matches		Semifinals	Final / BM	
Athlete	Event	Opposition Score	Rank	Opposition Score	Opposition Score	Rank
Maria-Eleni Kordali; Nikolaos Pananos; Grigorios Polychronidis	Mixed pairs BC3	Great Britain (GBR); W 5-0; Canada (CAN); W 3-2; South Korea (KOR); L 0-11	2 Q	Belgium (BEL); W 7-0	Portugal (POR); W 4-1	1st place, gold medalist(s)

== Cycling ==
=== Road ===
Men

Athlete	Event	Heats		Quarterfinals		Semifinals		Final	
Athlete	Event	Time	Rank	Time	Rank	Time	Rank	Time	Rank
Stamatios Kotzias	Mixed road race T1-2	—N/a						54.10	8
Stamatios Kotzias	Mixed time trial T1-2	—N/a						18:11.90	16
Christos Stefanakis	Ind. time trial B	—N/a						42:14.22	17

Women

Athlete	Event	Heats		Semifinals		Final	
Athlete	Event	Time	Rank	Time	Rank	Time	Rank
Adamantia Chalkiadaki	Ind. road race B	—N/a				2:12.56	6
Adamantia Chalkiadaki	Ind. time trial B	—N/a				DNF	–

=== Track ===
Pursuit

Athlete	Event	Qualification		Final	
Athlete	Event	Time	Rank	Opposition Time	Rank
Adamantia Chalkiadaki	Women's ind. pursuit B	4:01.449	11	did not advance	

Sprint

Athlete	Event	Qualification		Quarterfinals	Semifinals	Final	
Athlete	Event	Time	Rank	Opposition Time	Opposition Time	Opposition Time	Rank
Christos Stefanakis	Men's ind. sprint B	11.744	7 Q	Porto Lareo (ESP); L 11.610; L 11.961	did not advance	Oost (NED) –	6

Time trial

Athlete	Event	Final	
Athlete	Event	Time	Rank
Christos Stefanakis	Men's ind. 1 km time trial B	1:09.163	10
Adamantia Chalkiadaki	Women's ind. 1 km time trial B	1:17.619	8

== Powerlifting ==
Men

Athlete	Event	Total lifted	Rank
Nikolaos Gkountanis	-67.5 kg	-	-
Pavlos Mamalos	-90 kg	232	3rd place, bronze medalist(s)
Gremislav Moysiadis	-75 kg	188	5

== Sailing ==
Athlete	Event	Race											Score	Rank
Athlete	Event	1	2	3	4	5	6	7	8	9	10	11	Score	Rank
Georgios Delikouras	1 person keelboat (2.4mR)	15	11	12	9	8	~~17~~; DSQ	10	11	13	14	—N/a	103	14
Theodoros Alexas; Vasileios Christoforou; Argyris Notaroglou	3 person keelboat (Sonar)	~~12~~	10	9	6	3	6	11	5	9	8	—N/a	67	8

== Shooting ==
Athlete	Event	Qualification		Final	
Athlete	Event	Score	Rank	Score	Rank
Evangelos Kakosaios	Mixed R4-10M air rifle prone SH2	597	13	did not advance	
Evangelos Kakosaios	Mixed R5-10M air rifle prone SH2	596	23	did not advance	
Theodora Moutsiou	Mixed R4-10M air rifle prone SH2	591	23	did not advance	
Theodora Moutsiou	Mixed R5-10M air rifle prone SH2	596	24	did not advance	

== Swimming ==
Men

Athlete	Events	Heat		Final	
Athlete	Events	Time	Rank	Time	Rank
Georgios Kapellakis	50 m backstroke S2	1:11.80	8 Q	1:10.73	7
Georgios Kapellakis	50 m freestyle S2	1:10.48	9	did not advance	
Georgios Kapellakis	100 m freestyle S2	2:46.18	12	did not advance	
Konstantinos Karaouzas	50 m breaststroke SB3	55.81	9	did not advance	
Konstantinos Karaouzas	200 m freestyle S5	3:37.33	11	did not advance	
Andreas Katsaros	50 m backstroke S1	—N/a		1:59.44	7
Ioannis Kostakis	50 m backstroke S3	1:13.21	13	did not advance	
Ioannis Kostakis	50 m breaststroke SB2	1:05.94	9	did not advance	
Ioannis Kostakis	150 m individual medley SM3	3:44.18	13	did not advance	
Aristeidis Makrodimitris	50 m backstroke S2	1:07.14	2 Q	1:04.71	2nd place, silver medalist(s)
Aristeidis Makrodimitris	50 m freestyle S2	1:06.69	3 Q	1:04.86	3rd place, bronze medalist(s)
Aristeidis Makrodimitris	100 m freestyle S2	2:21.99	3 Q	2:21.04	3rd place, bronze medalist(s)
Aristeidis Makrodimitris	200 m freestyle S2	—N/a		5:13.86	6
Charalampos Taiganidis	50 m freestyle S13	24.74	7 Q	24.69	7
Charalampos Taiganidis	100 m backstroke S13	1:01.95	3 Q	1:01.10	3rd place, bronze medalist(s)
Christos Tampaxis	50 m backstroke S1	—N/a		1:20.76	2nd place, silver medalist(s)
Christos Tampaxis	50 m freestyle S2	—N/a		did not advance	
Alexandros Taxildaris	50 m backstroke S1	—N/a		1:49.23	6
Vasilis Tsagkarakis	50 m breaststroke SB3	52.39	5 Q	53.07	6
Antonios Tsapatakis	50 m butterfly S5	44.47	11	did not advance	
Antonios Tsapatakis	100 m breaststroke SB4	1:44.29	5 Q	1:41.37	4
Nikolaos Tsotras	50 m freestyle S7	31.09	10	did not advance	
Nikolaos Tsotras	100 m freestyle S7	1:10.99	13	did not advance	

Women

Athlete	Events	Heat		Final	
Athlete	Events	Time	Rank	Time	Rank
Chrysoula Antoniadou	100 m breaststroke SB4	2:04.56	6 Q	2:03.80	6
Maria Kalpakidou	50 m backstroke S2	—N/a		1:24.37	6
Maria Kalpakidou	100 m freestyle S3	2:54.88	11	did not advance	
Semicha Rizaoglou	50 m backstroke S4	1:08.13	11	did not advance	
Semicha Rizaoglou	50 m freestyle S3	—N/a		1:08.56	5
Semicha Rizaoglou	100 m freestyle S3	2:17.82	5 Q	2:19.92	5

== Wheelchair fencing ==
Men

Athlete	Event	Preliminary Round		Round of 16	Quarterfinals	Semifinals	Final	
Athlete	Event	Opposition Score	Rank	Opposition Score	Opposition Score	Opposition Score	Opposition Score	Rank
Georgios Alexakis	Sabre A	Chen (CHN); L 0-5; Chan (HKG); L 2-5; Makowski (POL); L 2-5; Fayzullin (RUS); L 1-5		did not advance				
Emmanouil Bogdos	Sabre B	Yusupov (RUS); L 2-5; Sarri (ITA); W 5-3; Datsko (UKR); L 1-5; Boehm (AUT); W 5-2		Triantafyllou (GRE); L 11-15	did not advance			
Gerasimos Pylarinos	Sabre A	Razali (MAS); W 5-0; Stanczuk (POL); W 5-1; Frolov (RUS); W 5-4; El Assine (FRA); W 5-3		BYE	Stanczuk (POL); L 6-15	did not advance		
Panagiotis Triantafyllou	Sabre B	Francois (FRA); L 2-5; Castro (POL); L 4-5; Kurzin (RUS); W 5-3; Brinson (USA); W 5-0		Bogdos (GRE); W 15-11	Pluta (POL); L 9-15	did not advance		

== See also ==
- 2012 Summer Paralympics
- Greece at the Paralympics
- Greece at the 2012 Summer Olympics
