= Greece at the 2024 Summer Paralympics =

- Flag of Greece
- IPC code: GRE
- NPC: Hellenic Paralympic Committee
- Website: www.paralympic.gr

in Paris, France August 28, 2024 – September 8, 2024
- Competitors: 37 in 10 sports
- Flag bearers (opening): Theodora Paschalidou; Manolis Stefanoudakis
- Flag bearers (closing): Alexandra Stamatopoulou; Antonios Tsapatakis
- Medals Ranked 33rd: Gold 3 Silver 3 Bronze 7 Total 13

Summer Paralympics appearances (overview)
- 1976; 1980; 1984; 1988; 1992; 1996; 2000; 2004; 2008; 2012; 2016; 2020; 2024

Greece competed at the 2024 Summer Paralympics in Paris, France, that took place from 28 August to 8 September. The Greek team won 13 medals all together. Three of them gold medals, three silver and seven bronze medals. Another notable achievement were the back-to-back win by Nasos Gavelas, the first Greek to do it and Grigoris Polychronidis who won his 7th medal in the BC3 event in boccia.

== Medalists ==
Medal	Name	Sport	Event	Date
Gold	Athanasios Konstantinidis	Athletics	Men's shot put F32	3 September
Gold	Athanasios Ghavelas; Guide: Ioannis Nyfantopoulos	Athletics	Men's 100 m T11	5 September
Gold	Alexandra Stamatopoulou	Swimming	Women's 50 m backststroke S4	7 September
Silver	Lida-Maria Manthopoulou	Athletics	100 metres T38	31 August
Silver	Athanasios Konstantinidis	Athletics	Men's club throw F32	31 August
Silver	Antonios Tsapatakis	Swimming	Men's 100 m breaststroke SB4	2 September
Bronze	Christina Gkentzou	Taekwondo	Women's 65 kg	30 August
Bronze	Eleni Papastamatopoulou	Taekwondo	Women's +65 kg	31 August
Bronze	Grigorios Polychronidis	Boccia	Men's individual BC3	1 September
Bronze	Konstantinos Tzounis	Athletics	Men's discus throw F56	2 September
Bronze	Lazaros Stefanidis	Athletics	Men's shot put F32	3 September
Bronze	Manolis Stefanoudakis	Athletics	Men's javelin throw F54	6 September
Bronze	Theodora Paschalidou	Judo	Women's 70kg J1	6 September

== Competitors ==
The following is the list of number of competitors in the Games.

Sport	Men	Women	Total
Archery	0	1	1
Athletics	11	3	14
Boccia	1	2	3
Cycling	1	0	1
Equestrian	1	0	1
Judo	0	2	2
Powerlifting	2	0	2
Shooting	2	0	2
Swimming	6	3	9
Taekwondo	0	2	2
Total	24	13	37

== Archery ==
Women

Athlete	Event	Ranking round		Round of 32	Round of 16	Quarterfinals	Semifinals	Final / BM	
Athlete	Event	Score	Seed	Opposition Score	Opposition Score	Opposition Score	Opposition Score	Opposition Score	Rank
Dorothea Poimenidou	Individual Recurve Open	588 SB	5	Bye	Rahimi (IRI); L 0-6	Did not advance			

== Athletics ==
Greek track and field athletes achieved quota places for the following events based on their results at the 2023 World Championships, 2024 World Championships, or through high performance allocation, as long as they meet the minimum entry standard (MES).

Key

- Note–Ranks given for track events are within the athlete's heat only
- Q = Qualified for the next round
- q = Qualified for the next round as a fastest loser or, in field events, by position without achieving the qualifying target
- DQ = Disqualified
- PR = Paralympic Record
- AR = Area (or continental) Record
- NR = National Record
- SB = Season's Best
- N/A = Round not applicable for the event
- Bye = Athlete not required to compete in round

Men's track & road events

Athlete	Event	Heat		Semifinal		Final	
Athlete	Event	Result	Rank	Result	Rank	Result	Rank
Athanasios Ghavelas; Guide: Ioannis Nyfantopoulos	Men's 100 m T11	11.16	1 Q	11.08	1 Q	11.02 SB	1st place, gold medalist(s)
Michail Seitis	Men's 200 m T64	23.32	7 q	—N/a		23.15	5
Stylianos Malakopoulos	Men's 400 m T62	—N/a				52.76 PB	7

Men's field events

Athlete	Event	Final	
Athlete	Event	Distance	Position
Athanasios Prodromou	Men's long jump T20	6.95	7
Efstratios Nikolaidis	Men's shot put F20	15.66 SB	7
Grigorios Ntislis	Men's discus throw F52	11.89	10
Athanasios Konstantinidis	Men's shot put F32	11.92 AR	1st place, gold medalist(s)
Athanasios Konstantinidis	Men's club throw F32	38.65 PB	2nd place, silver medalist(s)
Dimitrios Zisidis	Men's shot put F32	8.88	6
Dimitrios Zisidis	Men's club throw F32	23.90	9
Lazaros Stefanidis	Men's shot put F32	9.84	3rd place, bronze medalist(s)
Lazaros Stefanidis	Men's club throw F32	36.87	5
Stylianos Malakopoulos	Men's long jump T64	6.81	7
Manolis Stefanoudakis	Men's javelin throw F54	30.13	3rd place, bronze medalist(s)
Konstantinos Tzounis	Men's discus throw F56	41.32	3rd place, bronze medalist(s)

Women's track & road events

Athlete	Event	Heat		Final	
Athlete	Event	Result	Rank	Result	Rank
Lida-Maria Manthopoulou	100 metres T38	12.53 PB	3 Q	12.49 PB	2nd place, silver medalist(s)

Women's field events

Athlete	Event	Final	
Athlete	Event	Distance	Position
Zoi Mantoudi	Shot put F20	13.20 SB	9
Tania Keramyda	Javelin throw F56	21.96	4

== Boccia ==
Greece entered two athletes into the Paralympics games in the BC3, by winning the silver medal in the mixed pairs event for BC3, at the 2024 Paralympic Qualification Tournament in Coimbra, Portugal.

Athlete	Event	Pool matches				Quarterfinals	Semifinals	Final / BM	
Athlete	Event	Opposition Score	Opposition Score	Opposition Score	Rank	Opposition Score	Opposition Score	Opposition Score	Rank
Grigorios Polychronidis	Men's individual BC3	Menard (FRA); W 5–2	Arita (JPN); W 9–0	Carvalho (BRA); L 1–4	1 Q	Choochuenklin (THA); W 4–1	Michel (AUS); L 1–6	Iskrzycki (POL); W 4*–4	3rd place, bronze medalist(s)
Anna Ntenta	Women's individual BC3	Ferrando (ARG); L 2–8	Ichinoe (JPN); L 0–8	Callupe (PER); W 5–4	3	Did not advance			9
Chrysi Morfi Metzou	Women's individual BC4	Arambasic (CRO); W 5–4	Aller Mayo (ESP); W 7–0	Chica (COL); L 3–10	2 Q	Mat Salim (MAS); L 0–7	Did not advance		5
Grigorios Polychronidis; Anna Ntenta	Mixed pairs BC3	South Africa; W 10–0	Brazil; W 4–1	—N/a	1 Q	Argentina; L 4–5	Did not advance		5

== Cycling ==
Greece sent one male para-cyclist after finished the top eligible nation's at the 2022 UCI Nation's ranking allocation ranking.

Athlete	Event	Final	
Athlete	Event	Result	Rank
Nikolaos Papagelis	Men's road race C1-3	1:56:08	14
Nikolaos Papagelis	Men's time trial C2	20:12.32	4

== Equestrian ==
Greece entered two para-equestrians into the Paralympic equestrian competition, by virtue of the nations individual final world para dressage rankings.

Individual

Athlete	Horse	Event	Total	
Athlete	Horse	Event	Score	Rank
Michail Kalarakis	Eros CS	Individual championship test grade I	66.250	18

== Powerlifting ==
Men

Athlete	Event	Attempt			Result	Rank
Athlete	Event	1	2	3	Result	Rank
Dimitrios Bakochristos	−54 kg	166	169	170	170	7
Paschalis Kouloumoglou	−59 kg	176	181 x	181	181	6

== Judo ==
Theodora Paschalidou and Emmanouella Masourou have qualified for the Games.

Athlete	Event	Round of 16	Quarterfinals	Semifinals	Repechage	Final / BM	
Athlete	Event	Opposition Result	Opposition Result	Opposition Result	Opposition Result	Opposition Result	Rank
Theodora Paschalidou	Women's 70 kg J1	Bye	Lauria (ITA); W 10–00	Souza de Freitas (BRA); L 1–10	Bye	Lkhaijav (MGL); W 10–00	3rd place, bronze medalist(s)
Emmanouela Masourou	Women's 48 kg J1	Bye	Nikolaychyk (UKR); L 10–00	—N/a	Togtokhbayar (MGL); W 10–00	Tasin (TUR); L 00–10	5

== Shooting ==
Greece entered one para-shooter after achieved quota places for the following events by virtue of their best finishes at the 2022, 2023 and 2024 world cup, 2022 World Championships, 2023 World Championships, 2023 European Para Championships and 2024 European Championships, as long as they obtained a minimum qualifying score (MQS) by July 15, 2024.

Men

Athlete	Event	Qualification		Final	
Athlete	Event	Points	Rank	Points	Rank
Sotirios Galogavros	R1 Men's 10 metre air rifle standing SH1	620.4	5 Q	120.5	8
Sotirios Galogavros	R7 – 50 m rifle 3 positions SH1	1150	10	Did not advance	

Mixed

Athlete	Event	Qualification		Final	
Athlete	Event	Points	Rank	Points	Rank
Sotirios Galogavros	R6 Mixed 50 metre rifle prone SH1	618	16	Did not advance	
Panagiotis Giannoukaris	R4 Mixed 10 metre air rifle standing SH2	625.2	24	Did not advance	
Panagiotis Giannoukaris	R5 Mixed 10 metre air rifle prone SH2	618.4	36	Did not advance	

== Swimming ==
Greece secured one quotas at the 2023 World Para Swimming Championships after finishing in the top two places in Paralympic class disciplines.

Men

Athlete	Event	Heats		Final	
Athlete	Event	Result	Rank	Result	Rank
Dimitrios Karypidis	Men's 50m backstroke S1	—N/a		1:31.50	5
Dimitrios Karypidis	Men's 100m backstroke S1	—N/a		3:18.09	4
Nikolaos Kontou	Men's 50m backstroke S1	—N/a		1:37.48	6
Nikolaos Kontou	Men's 100m backstroke S1	—N/a		3:49.31	5
Ioannis Kostakis	Men's 50m freestyle S3	1:02.32	14	Did not advance	
Ioannis Kostakis	Men's 200m freestyle S3	4:35.61	12	Did not advance	
Ioannis Kostakis	Men's 50m breaststroke SB2	—N/a		1:14.00	7
Ioannis Kostakis	Men's 150m individual medley SM3	3:47.16	12	Did not advance	
Alexandros-Stylianos Lergios	Men's 50m freestyle S5	38.00	12	Did not advance	
Alexandros-Stylianos Lergios	Men's 100m freestyle S5	1:23.01	11	Did not advance	
Alexandros-Stylianos Lergios	Men's 50m butterfly S5	40.56	11	Did not advance	
Dimosthenis Michalentzakis	Men's 100 m freestyle S8	59.44	4 Q	59.75	6
Dimosthenis Michalentzakis	Men's 100 m butterfly S8	1:06.63	7 Q	DQ	
Dimosthenis Michalentzakis	Men's 200 m individual medley SM8	2:30.51	6 Q	2:25.97	4
Antonios Tsapatakis	Men's 100 m breaststroke SB4	1:37.00	2 Q	1:36.16	2nd place, silver medalist(s)

Women

Athlete	Event	Heats		Final	
Athlete	Event	Result	Rank	Result	Rank
Areti Aravela Spyridou	50 m backstroke S2	1:46.04 PB	10	Did not advance	
Areti Aravela Spyridou	100 m backstroke S2	3:45.65 PB	10	Did not advance	
Alexandra Stamatopoulou	50m backstroke S4	—N/a		50.12	1st place, gold medalist(s)
Alexandra Stamatopoulou	50m freestyle S4	47.73	10	Did not advance	
Maria Tziveleki	200 m individual medley SM5	4:17.39	13	Did not advance	
Maria Tziveleki	200 m freestyle S5	3:28.19 PB	15	Did not advance	

Mixed

Athlete	Event	Heats		Final	
Athlete	Event	Result	Rank	Result	Rank
Alexandros-Stylianos Lergios, Antonios Tsapatakis; Alexandra Stamatopoulou, Maria Tziveleki	Mixed relay 4 x 50 m freestyle 20pts	2:52.59	9	Did not advance	
Alexandra Stamatopoulou, Antonios Tsapatakis; Alexandros-Stylianos Lergios, Maria Tziveleki	Mixed relay 4 x 50 m medley 20pts	3:03.98	9	Did not advance	

== Taekwondo ==
Greece entered one athletes to compete at the Paralympics competition. Eleni Papastamatopoulou qualified for Paris 2024, following the triumph of her gold medal results in women's +65 kg classes, at the 2024 European Qualification Tournament in Sofia, Bulgaria.

Athlete	Event	First round	Quarterfinals	Semifinals	Repechage	Final / BM	
Athlete	Event	Opposition Result	Opposition Result	Opposition Result	Opposition Result	Opposition Result	Rank
Eleni Papastamatopoulou	Women's +65 kg	Kyeremaa (GHA); W 24-7	Naimova (UZB); L 5-12	Did not advance	Santiago Moreno (ESP); W 11-7	Fernanda Vargas (MEX); W 36-9	3rd place, bronze medalist(s)
Christina Gkentzou	Women's 65 kg	Zewar (POL); W 22-0	Silva de Moura (BRA); L 7-11	Did not advance	Secil (TUR); W 23-2	Yao (CHN); W 14-4	3rd place, bronze medalist(s)

== See also ==
- Greece at the 2024 Summer Olympics
- Greece at the Paralympics
