= Greece at the 2000 Summer Paralympics =

- IPC code: GRE
- NPC: Hellenic Paralympic Committee
- Website: www.paralympic.gr

in Sydney
- Competitors: 42
- Flag bearer: Dimitrios Konstantakas
- Medals Ranked 33rd: Gold 4 Silver 4 Bronze 3 Total 11

Summer Paralympics appearances (overview)
- 1976; 1980; 1984; 1988; 1992; 1996; 2000; 2004; 2008; 2012; 2016; 2020; 2024

There were three female and 39 male athletes representing the country at the 2000 Summer Paralympics. As host of 2004 edition in Athens, a Greek segment was featured on closing ceremony.

== Medalists ==
Medal	Name	Sport	Event
Gold	Konstantinos Fykas	Swimming	Men's 50 m freestyle S8
Gold	Konstantinos Fykas	Swimming	Men's 100 m freestyle S8
Gold	Athanasios Barakas	Athletics	Men's long jump F11
Gold	Stefanos Anargyrou	Athletics	Men's shot put F55
Silver	Eleni Samaritaki	Athletics	Women's 200 m T36
Silver	Eleni Samaritaki	Athletics	Women's 400 m T36
Silver	Parashos Stogiannidis	Athletics	Men's high jump F20
Silver	Evangelos Bakolas	Athletics	Men's shot put F33
Bronze	Parashos Stogiannidis	Athletics	Men's javelin throw F20
Bronze	Maria Kalpakidou	Swimming	Women's 50 m backstroke S2
Bronze	Symeon Paltsanitidis	Athletics	Men's discus throw F55

== See also ==
- 2000 Summer Paralympics
- Greece at the Paralympics

== Bibliography ==
- International Paralympic Committee (2000). "Appendix C: Athlete Numbers - By Delegation". Sydney 2000 Paralympic Games Post Games Report. Sydney.
