= Greece at the 1988 Summer Paralympics =

- IPC code: GRE
- NPC: Hellenic Paralympic Committee
- Website: www.paralympic.gr

in Seoul
- Competitors: 4
- Medals Ranked 44th: Gold 0 Silver 1 Bronze 3 Total 4

Summer Paralympics appearances (overview)
- 1976; 1980; 1984; 1988; 1992; 1996; 2000; 2004; 2008; 2012; 2016; 2020; 2024

Greece competed at the 1988 Summer Paralympics in Seoul, South Korea. 4 competitors from Greece won 4 medals, 1 silver and 3 bronze and finished 44th in the medal table.

== Medalists ==
Medal	Name	Sport	Event
Silver	Kyriakos Griveas	Swimming	Men's 25 m backstroke 1B
Bronze	Kyriakos Griveas	Swimming	Men's 50 m freestyle 1A
Bronze	Christos Angourakis	Athletics	Men's javelin throw THW3
Bronze	Georgios Toptsis	Athletics	Men's long jump J4

== See also ==
- Greece at the Paralympics
- Greece at the 1988 Summer Olympics
