= Greece at the 1996 Summer Paralympics =

- IPC code: GRE
- NPC: Hellenic Paralympic Committee
- Website: www.paralympic.gr

in Atlanta
- Competitors: 16
- Flag bearer: Christos Angourakis
- Medals Ranked 46th: Gold 1 Silver 1 Bronze 3 Total 5

Summer Paralympics appearances (overview)
- 1976; 1980; 1984; 1988; 1992; 1996; 2000; 2004; 2008; 2012; 2016; 2020; 2024

Sixteen male athletes from Greece competed at the 1996 Summer Paralympics in Atlanta, United States.

== Medalists ==
Medal	Name	Sport	Event
Gold	Dimitrios Konstantakas	Athletics	Men's shot put F55
Silver	Konstantinos Fykas	Swimming	Men's 50 m freestyle S8
Bronze	Stefanos Anargyrou	Athletics	Men's shot put F54
Bronze	Georgios Toptsis	Athletics	Men's long jump F45-46
Bronze	Antonios Giapoutzis	Swimming	Men's 50 m butterfly S3

== See also ==
- Greece at the Paralympics
- Greece at the 1996 Summer Olympics
