= Greece at the 1992 Summer Paralympics =

- IPC code: GRE
- NPC: Hellenic Paralympic Committee
- Website: www.paralympic.gr

in Barcelona
- Competitors: 7
- Medals Ranked 48th: Gold 0 Silver 3 Bronze 1 Total 4

Summer Paralympics appearances (overview)
- 1976; 1980; 1984; 1988; 1992; 1996; 2000; 2004; 2008; 2012; 2016; 2020; 2024

Greece competed at the 1992 Summer Paralympics in Barcelona and Madrid, Spain. 7 competitors from Greece won 4 medals including 3 silver and 1 bronze and finished joint 44th in the medal table with Estonia. Greece finished on the eighteen place in Madrid with 1 silver and finished the games at the 48th place.

== Medalists ==
Medal	Name	Sport	Event
Silver	Christos Angourakis	Athletics	Men's javelin throw THW3
Silver	Georgios Toptsis	Athletics	Men's long jump J4
Bronze	Christos Angourakis	Athletics	Men's shot put THW3

== See also ==
- Greece at the Paralympics
- Greece at the 1992 Summer Olympics
