= Swimming at the 2016 Summer Paralympics – Women's 50 metre backstroke =

The women's 50 metre backstroke swimming events for the 2016 Summer Paralympics take place at the Rio Olympic Stadium from 10 to 16 September. A total of four events were contested for four different classifications.

== Competition format ==
Each event consists of two rounds: heats and final. The top eight swimmers overall in the heats progress to the final. If there are eight or fewer swimmers in an event, no heats are held and all swimmers qualify for the final.

== Results ==
=== S2 ===
19:52 15 September 2016:

Rank	Lane	Name	Nationality	Time	Notes
1st place, gold medalist(s)	4	Pin Xiu Yip	Singapore	1:00.33	
2nd place, silver medalist(s)	5	Yazhu Feng	China	1:02.66	
3rd place, bronze medalist(s)	3	Iryna Sotska	Ukraine	1:17.22	
4	6	Gloria Boccanera	Italy	1:22.80	
5	7	Maria Kalpakidou	Greece	1:24.45	
6	1	Zsanett Adami	Hungary	1:25.97	
7	2	Cassie Mitchell	United States	1:28.19	

=== S3 ===
18:32 10 September 2016:

Rank	Lane	Name	Nationality	Time	Notes
1st place, gold medalist(s)	4	Qiuping Peng	China	48.49	WR
2nd place, silver medalist(s)	5	Guofen Meng	China	51.42	
3rd place, bronze medalist(s)	3	Lisette Teunissen	Netherlands	53.44	
4	6	Olga Sviderska	Ukraine	54.01	
5	2	Alexandra Stamatopoulou	Greece	58.33	
6	8	Zulfiya Gabidullina	Kazakhstan	1:00.68	
7	7	Maiara Regina Perreira Barreto	Brazil	1:01.65	
8	1	Semicha Rizaoglou	Greece	1:12.05	

=== S4 ===
18:30 16 September 2016:

Rank	Lane	Name	Nationality	Time	Notes
1st place, gold medalist(s)	4	Jiao Cheng	China	48.11	
2nd place, silver medalist(s)	3	Yue Deng	China	50.01	
3rd place, bronze medalist(s)	6	Maryna Verbova	Ukraine	52.28	
4	7	Nely Miranda Herrera	Mexico	53.42	
5	1	Arjola Trimi	Italy	54.03	
6	5	Mariia Lafina	Ukraine	54.08	
7	2	Edênia Garcia	Brazil	55.50	
8	8	Sonja Sigurdardottir	Iceland	59.97	

=== S5 ===
19:58 16 September 2016:

Rank	Lane	Name	Nationality	Time	Notes
1st place, gold medalist(s)	4	Teresa Perales	Spain	43.03	
2nd place, silver medalist(s)	5	Bela Trebinova	Czech Republic	44.51	
3rd place, bronze medalist(s)	7	Sarah Louise Rung	Norway	45.40	
4	6	Li Zhang	China	47.07	
5	3	Mayumi Narita	Japan	47.63	
6	2	Alyssa Gialamas	United States	47.95	
7	8	Anita Fatis	France	49.23	
8	1	Natallia Shavel	Belarus	50.41	
