= Greece at the 1980 Summer Paralympics =

- IPC code: GRE
- NPC: Hellenic Paralympic Committee
- Website: www.paralympic.gr

in Arnhem
- Competitors: 7
- Medals Ranked 38th: Gold 0 Silver 0 Bronze 1 Total 1

Summer Paralympics appearances (overview)
- 1976; 1980; 1984; 1988; 1992; 1996; 2000; 2004; 2008; 2012; 2016; 2020; 2024

Greece competed at the 1980 Summer Paralympics in Arnhem, Netherlands. 7 competitors from Greece won a single bronze medal and finished joint 38th in the medal table with Luxembourg and Malta.

== Medalists ==
Medal	Name	Sport	Event
Bronze	George Mouzakis	Athletics	Men's 60 m 1B

== See also ==
- Greece at the Paralympics
- Greece at the 1980 Summer Olympics
