= Swimming at the 2008 Summer Paralympics – Men's 50 metre backstroke S1 =

Men's 50m Backstroke S1 at the XIII Paralympic Games
- Venue: Beijing National Aquatics Center
- Dates: 15 September
- Competitors: 6 from 4 nations
- Winning time: 1:23.15

Medalists
1st place, gold medalist(s)		Christos Tampaxis	Greece
2nd place, silver medalist(s)		Andreas Katsaros	Greece
3rd place, bronze medalist(s)		João Martins	Portugal

The men's 50m backstroke S1 event at the 2008 Summer Paralympics took place at the Beijing National Aquatics Center on 15 September. There were no heats in this event.

== Final ==
Competed at 17:00.

Rank	Name	Nationality	Time	Notes
1st place, gold medalist(s)	Christos Tampaxis	Greece	1:23.15	
2nd place, silver medalist(s)	Andreas Katsaros	Greece	1:44.53	
3rd place, bronze medalist(s)	João Martins	Portugal	1:47.76	
4	Alexandros Taxildaris	Greece	1:50.49	
5	Andrius Bickauskas	Lithuania	2:27.68	
6	Grover Evans	United States	2:51.17	
