= Swimming at the 2004 Summer Paralympics – Men's 50 metre backstroke S1 =

Men's 50m Backstroke S1 at the XII Paralympic Games
- Paralympic Swimming
- Venue: Olympic Aquatic Centre
- Dates: 27 September 2004
- Competitors: 6 from 5 nations
- Winning time: 1:22.20

Medalists
1st place, gold medalist(s)		Christos Tampaxis	Greece
2nd place, silver medalist(s)		Alexandros Taxildaris	Greece
3rd place, bronze medalist(s)		João Martins	Portugal

The Men's 50 metre backstroke S1 swimming event at the 2004 Summer Paralympics was competed on 27 September. It was won by Christos Tampaxis, representing Greece.

== Final round ==
27 Sept. 2004, evening session

Rank	Athlete	Time	Notes
1st place, gold medalist(s)	Christos Tampaxis (GRE)	1:22.20	PR
2nd place, silver medalist(s)	Alexandros Taxildaris (GRE)	1:42.34	
3rd place, bronze medalist(s)	João Martins (POR)	1:47.19	
4	Jiri Kaderavek (CZE)	1:48.23	
5	Mateo Micic (ARG)	2:22.77	
	Grover Evans (USA)	DSQ	
