= Peng Qiuping =

Chinese Paralympic swimmer

Personal information
- Nationality: Chinese
- Born: August 12, 1994 (age 31)

Sport
- Sport: Swimming
Medal record
Representing China
Women's Paralympic swimming
Summer Paralympics
Gold medal – first place	2016 Rio de Janeiro	Mixed 4x50 m freestyle relay (20 Pts)
Gold medal – first place	2016 Rio de Janeiro	Women's 50 metre Backstroke S3
Gold medal – first place	2024 Paris	Mixed 4x50 m freestyle relay (20 Pts)
Silver medal – second place	2016 Rio de Janeiro	Women's 100m Freestyle S3
Asian Para Games
Silver medal – second place	2018 Jakarta	Mixed 4×50 m freestyle relay-20Points

Peng Qiuping (born August 12, 1994) is a Chinese swimmer. She won a gold medal at the Mixed 4x50metre freestyle relay-20 Points event at the 2016 Summer Paralympics with a total team time of 2:18.03, a world record and paralympic record. She also won a gold medal at the Women's 50 metre Backstroke S3 event with a world record and paralympic record of 48.49 and a silver medal at the Women's 100m Freestyle S3 event with 1:34.71.
