= Powerlifting at the 2008 Summer Paralympics – Men's 82.5 kg =

Powerlifting - Men's 82.5 kg at the XIII Paralympic Games
- Venue: Beihang University Gymnasium
- Date: 15 September 2008
- Competitors: 13 from 13 nations

Medalists
1st place, gold medalist(s)		Zhang Haidong	China
2nd place, silver medalist(s)		Pavlos Mamalos	Greece
3rd place, bronze medalist(s)		Thaer Al-Ali	Iraq

The men's 82.5 kg powerlifting event at the 2008 Summer Paralympics was contested on 15 September at the Beihang University Gymnasium in Beijing, China. This event was the fourth-heaviest of the men's powerlifting weight classes, limiting competitors to a maximum of 82.5 kilograms (181.9 lb) of body mass. Powerlifters were divided into two groups, A and B, with group B beginning their lifts at 13:00 and group A at 13:45.

As with all Paralympic powerlifting events, lifters competed in the bench press. Each athlete was allowed three attempts to bench press as much weight as possible. Athletes attempting to break a record were allowed a fourth attempt. For the attempt to be valid, the competitor must have lowered the weighted bar to his chest, held it motionless for a moment, then pressed the bar upwards until his arms were fully extended. If the competitor failed to meet these requirements or any other rule infraction was committed, the attempt was declared invalid by a team of three referees and the result struck from the record.

== Results ==
Rank	Name	Group	Body weight (kg)	Attempts (kg)				Result (kg)
Rank	Name	Group	Body weight (kg)	1	2	3	4	Result (kg)
1st place, gold medalist(s)	Zhang Haidong (CHN)	A	81.67	225.0	230.0	~~249.0~~	–	230.0
2nd place, silver medalist(s)	Pavlos Mamalos (GRE)	A	81.03	217.5	~~222.5~~	225.0	–	225.0
3rd place, bronze medalist(s)	Thaer Al-Ali (IRQ)	A	82.09	215.0	220.0	222.5	–	222.5
4	Hany Mohsen Abd Elhady (EGY)	A	79.75	215.0	220.0	~~222.5~~	–	220.0
5	Vadim Rakitin (RUS)	A	81.11	185.0	192.5	200.0	–	200.0
6	Ammar Shekh Ahmad (SYR)	A	81.35	192.5	~~200.0~~	~~200.0~~	–	192.5
7	Ovezgeldi Orjiyev (TKM)	B	79.25	180.0	190.0	~~195.0~~	–	190.0
8	Janne Piipponen (FIN)	B	81.04	172.5	~~182.5~~	~~182.5~~	–	172.5
9	Joao Euzebio (BRA)	B	80.22	170.0	~~175.0~~	~~175.0~~	–	170.0
10	Said Kalakh (MAR)	B	81.56	160.0	165.0	170.0	–	170.0
11	Martin Bihary (CZE)	B	81.95	155.0	~~162.5~~	~~165.0~~	–	155.0
–	Jose Marino (ECU)	B	75.97	~~180.0~~	~~185.0~~	~~185.0~~	–	NMR
–	Spas Spasov (BUL)	B	81.53	~~175.0~~	~~175.0~~	~~185.0~~	–	NMR

Key: NMR=No marks recorded
