= Efthymios Kalaras =

Greek Paralympic athlete

Medal record

Paralympic athletics

Representing Greece

Paralympic Games
| Silver medal – second place | 2004 Athens | Discus Throw - F54 |

Efthymios Kalaras is a paralympic athlete from Greece competing mainly in category F54 discus throw events.

Efthymios twice competed in the discus at the Paralympics, the first time in the 2004 Summer Paralympics led to a silver medal. He could not match this performance in the 2008 Summer Paralympics where he finished fifth.
