= Anastasia Pyrgioti =

Greek Paralympic boccia player (born 1992)

Personal information
- Born: 16 January 1992 (age 34)
Medal record
Boccia
Representing Greece
Paralympic Games
Bronze medal – third place	2020 Tokyo	Mixed Pairs BC3
European Championships
Silver medal – second place	2019 Seville	Pairs BC3

Anastasia Pyrgioti (born 16 January 1992) is a Greek boccia player with a Paralympic boccia classification of BC3. She won a bronze medal at the 2020 Summer Paralympics in BC3 mixed pairs along with Grigorios Polychronidis and Anna Ntenta.

Pyrgioti works as a psychologist by profession.
