= Theodora Paschalidou =

Greek judoka (born 1997)

Personal information
- Nationality: Greek
- Born: 12 March 1997 (age 29) Polygyros, Greece
- Occupation: Judoka

Sport
- Country: Greece
- Sport: Judo
Medal record
Women's judo
Representing Greece
Paralympic Games
Bronze medal – third place	2024 Paris	-70 kg
European Championships
Gold medal – first place	2023 Rotterdam	-70 kg J1
Bronze medal – third place	2022 Cagliari	-70 kg J1

Theodora Paschalidou (Greek: Θεοδώρα Πασχαλίδου; born 12 March 1997) is a Greek judoka who represented her country at the 2020 and 2024 Summer Paralympics. She is the first Greek athlete to win an Olympic medal in para judo.

== Personal life ==
Paschalidou is studying law (as of 2022). In her free time, she sings and plays the musical instrument Kanun. She is blind.

== Career ==
Paschalidou started judo in 2005. She liked fighting without hurting anyone. When her teacher, Paralympic judoka Theoklitos Papachristos, wanted to become a judo coach, she spontaneously decided to start judo. Paschalidou won a silver medal in the under 63 kg category at the Visually Impaired German Open in Heidelberg in 2016. In 2017, she came third at the IBSA international judo tournament in Vilnius.

At the 2020 Summer Paralympics, which were not held until 2021 due to the COVID-19 pandemic, Paschalidou finished in 7th place among athletes with severely impaired vision (B1) in the up to 70 kg category. She lost to both the Japanese Kazusa Ogawa by ippon and the Mexican Lenia Ruvalcaba. In 2022, she won the silver medal in the over 70 kg category at the Egyptian Pyramids International Championships in Alexandria, Egypt. In the autumn of the same year, Paschalidou took part in the Para Judo World Championships in Baku in the J1 category for women under 70 kg and reached fifth place. Also in 2022, she came third in the J1 up to 70 kg category at the European Judo Championships for the Blind at the Pala Pirastu Sports Palace in Cagliari.

Paschalidou qualified for the 2024 Summer Paralympics in Paris, where she defeated Mongolian Turuunaa Lkhaijav in the bronze medal match, becoming the first judoka to win an Olympic medal in para judo for Greece. She was also the flag bearer for Greece at the opening ceremony of the Games.
