= Athanasios Ghavelas =

Greek Paralympic athlete (born 1999)

Personal information
- Nationality: Greek
- Born: 19 December 1999 (age 26)

Sport
- Country: Greece
- Sport: Paralympic athletics
- Disability class: T11
- Events: 100 metres, 60 metres, 200 metres
- Coached by: Nestoras Kolovos

Achievements and titles
- Personal bests: 100m: 10.82s WR (2021); 60m: 7.10s WR (2022); 200m: 22.79s WR (2022)
Medal record
Men's para-athletics
Representing Greece
Paralympic Games
Gold medal – first place	2020 Tokyo	100 m T11
Gold medal – first place	2024 Paris	100 m T11
World Championships
Gold medal – first place	2023 Paris	100 m T11
Gold medal – first place	2025 New Delhi	100 m T11
European Championships
Gold medal – first place	2018 Berlin	100 m T12
Gold medal – first place	2021 Bydgoszcz	100 m T11
Silver medal – second place	2018 Berlin	200 m T12

Athanasios Ghavelas (born 19 December 1999) is a Greek track and field Paralympic athlete and two-time Paralympic Champion in the 100 metres T11 category. He is the fastest blind person in the world, holding the T11 world record in both the 100 metres with a time of 10.82 seconds and the 60 metres with a time of 7.10 seconds.

He has been competing since the age of 17 and has achieved distinction at both World and European levels, winning the gold medal in all three major championships.

His hails is from Strofylia, Euboea from his father, and from Pylos, Messinia from his mother.

== Career ==
Ghavelas represented Greece at the 2020 Summer Paralympics in the 100 metres T11 event and won the gold medal with a world record time of 10.82. At the 2024 Summer Paralympics, in Paris, France, Ghavelas won the gold medal in the 100m (T11).

In addition to national competitions, he has participated and distinguished himself in European and World Championships, securing top positions. His highest achievements include the T11 100m World Record with a time of 10.82 seconds at the "Tokyo 2020" Paralympic Games in the summer of 2021, and the 60m World Record with 7.10 seconds at the SEGAS Indoor Track and Field Meet in Athens in February 2022.

His athletic career features participation in domestic and international meets, such as the International Para Athletics Meeting in Marrakech (Gold in 200m), the World Para Athletics Grand Prix in Dubai (Gold in 100m), the Paris Grand Prix - Handisport Open Paris - (Gold in 100m), and the Diamond League in Oslo, where he took part in the 'Race to Zero' to raise awareness for the inclusion of athletes with disabilities in major events. At the Hellenic Para Athletics Championship, he also competed in the 200m (22.08s) and made his long jump debut with a mark of 6.15m.

== Awards ==
In 2021, he was named "Athlete with a Disability of the Year" at the annual Gazzetta Awards via a public vote, and "Top Athlete with a Disability of the Year" by the Panhellenic Sport Press Association (PSAT), an award presented to him by the President of the Hellenic Republic, Katerina Sakellaropoulou.

In December 2022, the indoor gymnasium of his former high school (1st Senior High School of Nea Psychiko) was renamed the "Athanasios Gavelas" Indoor Gymnasium.

In December 2023, he was awarded "Top Athlete with a Disability of the Year" by the Panhellenic Sport Press Association (PSAT).
