= Athanasios Konstantinidis =

Greek Paralympic athlete (born 1970)

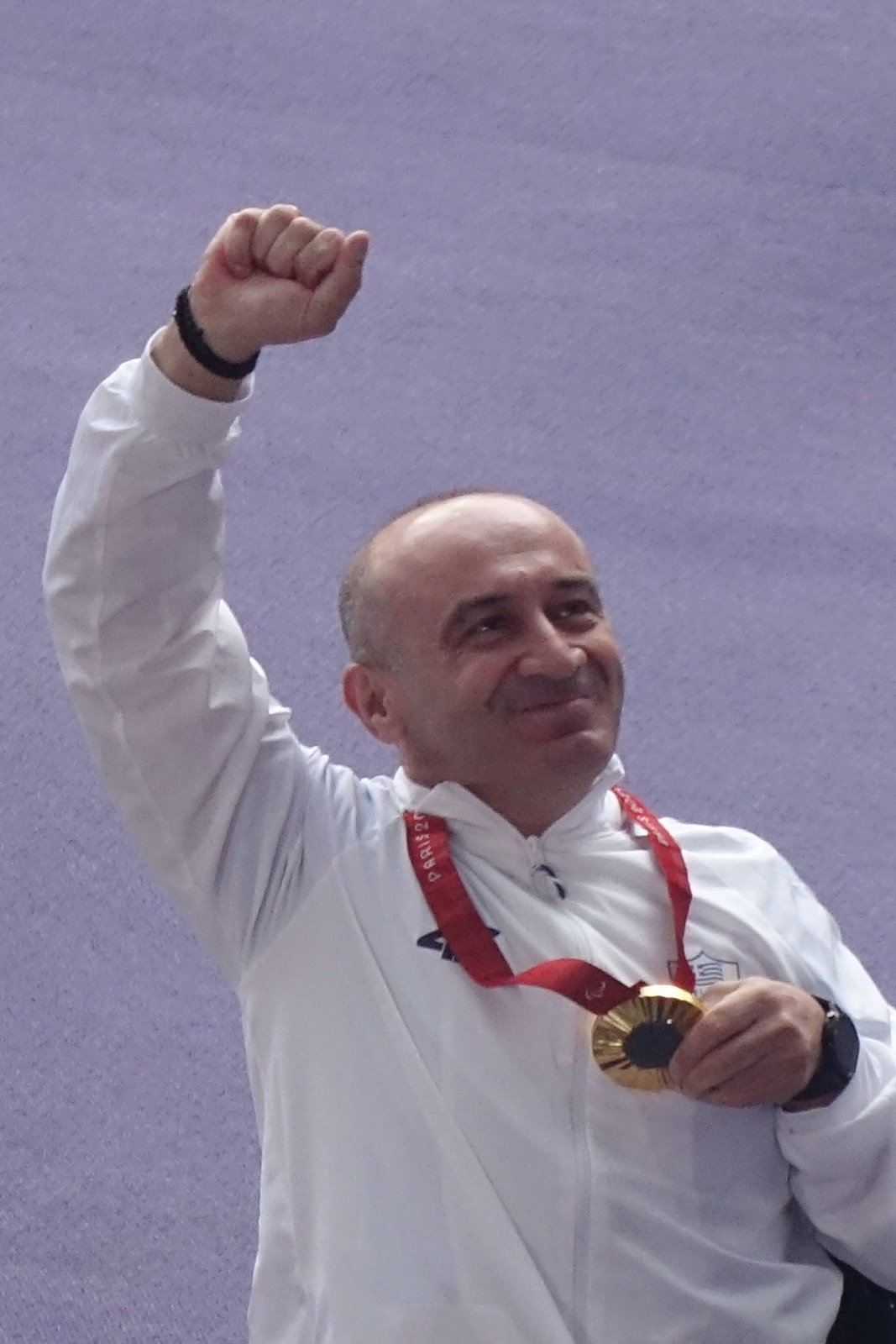
- Konstantinidis at the 2024 Summer Paralympics

Personal information
- Nationality: Greek
- Born: 29 April 1970 (age 56) Lachanas

Sport
- Country: Greece
- Sport: Para athletics
- Disability class: F32
- Event(s): Club throw, Shot put
Medal record
Men's para-athletics
Representing Greece
Paralympic Games
Gold medal – first place	2016 Rio de Janeiro	Shot put F32
Gold medal – first place	2024 Paris	Shot put F32
Silver medal – second place	2016 Rio de Janeiro	Club Throw F32
Silver medal – second place	2020 Tokyo	Club Throw F32
Silver medal – second place	2024 Paris	Club Throw F32
World Championships
Silver medal – second place	2024 Kobe	Shot put F32
Silver medal – second place	2025 New Delhi	Shot put F32
Bronze medal – third place	2023 Paris	Shot put F32

Athanasios Konstantinidis (born 29 April 1970) is a Greek para-athlete.

== Career ==
He competed at the 2016 Summer Paralympics in the F32 shot put and club throw. He gold medalled in the shot put with a world record distance of 10.39 metres. He also competed at the Tokyo 2020 Paralympics, winning a silver medal in the club throw event.

At the 2024 Summer Paralympics, in Paris, France, Konstantinidis won the gold medal in the F32 shot put event achieving a European record.
