= Panagiotis Triantafyllou =

Greek wheelchair fencer

Sport
- Country: Greece
- Sport: Wheelchair fencing
Medal record
Paralympic Games
Silver medal – second place	2016 Rio de Janeiro	Sabre B
Bronze medal – third place	2020 Tokyo	Sabre B

Panagiotis Triantafyllou is a Greek wheelchair fencer who competes in épée and sabre. He represented Greece at the Summer Paralympics in 2012, 2016 and 2021. He won the silver medal in the men's sabre B event at the 2016 Summer Paralympics. At the 2020 Summer Paralympics held in Tokyo, Japan, he won the bronze medal in the same event.

In the November 2019 event of the IWAS Wheelchair Fencing World Cup he won the gold medal in the men's sabre B competition.
