= Anthi Karagianni =

Greek paralympic athlete

Personal information
- Full name: Anthi Karagianni
- Nationality: Greece
- Born: 22 June 1981 (age 45) Kavala, Greece

Sport
- Sport: Long jump, 100 metres sprint
Medal record
Paralympic athletics
Representing Greece
Paralympic Games
Silver medal – second place	2004 Athens	Long Jump - F13
Silver medal – second place	2004 Athens	100m – T13
Silver medal – second place	2004 Athens	400m - T13
Silver medal – second place	2008 Beijing	Long Jump - F13
Bronze medal – third place	2012 London	Long Jump - F13

Anthi Karagianni (Greek: Ανθή Καραγιάννη) is a Paralympian athlete from Greece competing mainly in category F13 long jump and in sprint events. She competed in the 2004 Summer Paralympics in Athens, Greece where she won silver medals in the T13 100m, T13 400m and F13 long jump. Karagianni also competed in the 2008 Summer Paralympics in Beijing, China. There she won a silver medal in the women's F13 long jump event and competed in the T13 100m and 200m events. In the 2012 Summer Paralympics she took the third place in F13 long jump, winning her fifth medal in the Paralympic Games. The Municipal Stadium "Anthi Karagianni" in her hometown of Kavala, Greece, was renamed in her honour in 2004.

She was named the Best Greek athlete with a disability for 2007.
