= Che Jon Fernandes =

Greek Paralympic athlete (born 1971)

Personal information
- Nationality: Greek
- Born: 22 July 1971 (age 54)

Sport
- Country: Greece
- Sport: Paralympic athletics
- Disability class: F53
- Event: Throwing events
Medal record
Event	1st	2nd	3rd
Paralympic Games	1	0	1
World Championships	1	0	1
European Championships	2	0	0
Paralympic athletics
Representing Greece
Paralympic Games
Gold medal – first place	2016 Rio de Janeiro	Shot put - F53
Bronze medal – third place	2008 Beijing	Shot put - F53/54
IPC Athletics World Championships
Gold medal – first place	2015 Doha	Shot put F53
Bronze medal – third place	2013 Lyon	Shot put F52/53
IPC European Championships
Gold medal – first place	2016 Grosseto	Shot put - F53
Gold medal – first place	2012 Stadskanaal	Shot put - F52/53

Che Jon Fernandes (born 22 July 1971) is a Paralympian athlete from Greece competing mainly in category F53-54 shot put events.

He competed in the 2008 Summer Paralympics in Beijing, China. There he won a bronze medal in the men's F53-54 shot put event.
