= Christos Angourakis =

Greek Paralympic athlete (1952–2022)

Medal record

Paralympic athletics

Representing Greece

Paralympic Games
Silver medal – second place	1992 Barcelona	Javelin throw - F53
Bronze medal – third place	1988 Seoul	Javelin throw - 1B
Bronze medal – third place	1992 Barcelona	Shot put - F53
Bronze medal – third place	2004 Athens	Shot put - F53

Christos Angourakis (Greek: Χρήστος Αγγουράκης; 24 August 1952 – 22 February 2022) was a Greek Paralympic athlete who competed mainly in category F53 throwing events.

Born in Greece, Angourakis competed in the javelin throw and shot put at the 1996 Summer Paralympics, then in the discus throw and javelin throw at the 2000 Summer Paralympics. At the 2004 Summer Paralympics, he competed in the javelin throw and won the bronze medal in the shot put.

He was named the Best Greek athlete with a disability for 2005.

He died on 22 February 2022, at the age of 69.
