= Athanasios Barakas =

Greek Paralympic athlete

Medal record

Track and field (athletics)

Representing Greece

Paralympic Games
Gold medal – first place	2000 Sydney	Long Jump - F11
Bronze medal – third place	2008 Beijing	Long Jump - F11

Athanasios Barakas is a Paralympian athlete from Greece competing mainly in category F11 long jump events.

Athanasios has competed in three Paralympics. The first in 2000 in Sydney where he competed in the 100 metres and won the F11 long jump. Four years later at the 2004 edition in his home country he competed in the 100 metres, long jump, triple jump and was part of the Greek team in the 4 x 100 metres but failed to win a medal. This was not the case in Beijing in 2008 where he won the bronze medal in the long jump as well as competing in the triple jump.
