= Maria Kalpakidou =

Personal information
- Born: 3 February 1985 (age 41) Thessaloniki, Greece

Sport
- Sport: Paralympic swimming
- Disability class: S2
Medal record
Representing Greece
Paralympic Games
| Silver medal – second place | 2004 Athens | 50m freestyle S2 |
| Silver medal – second place | 2004 Athens | 50m backstroke S2 |
| Bronze medal – third place | 2000 Sydney | 50m backstroke S2 |
World Championships
| Gold medal – first place | 2006 Durban | 50m freestyle S2 |
| Gold medal – first place | 2006 Durban | 100m freestyle S2 |
| Silver medal – second place | 2002 Mar del Plata | 50m freestyle S2 |
| Silver medal – second place | 2002 Mar del Plata | 200m freestyle S2 |
| Silver medal – second place | 2002 Mar del Plata | 50m backstroke S2 |
| Silver medal – second place | 2006 Durban | 50m backstroke S2 |
| Bronze medal – third place | 2002 Mar del Plata | 100m freestyle S2 |

Maria Kalpakidou (born 3 February 1985) is a Greek Paralympic swimmer who competes in international swimming competitions. She is a three-time Paralympic medalist and double World champion.
