= Hellenic Paralympic Committee =

National Paralympic Committee of Greece

National Paralympic Committee
- Country: Greece
- Code: GRE
- Created: 2000
- Recognized: 2001
- Continental association: EPC
- Headquarters: Athens, Greece
- President: Georgios Kapellakis
- Secretary General: Christos Tzamousis
- Website: www.paralympic.gr

The Hellenic Paralympic Committee (Greek: Ελληνική Παραολυμπιακή Επιτροπή) is the National Paralympic Committee in Greece for the Paralympic Games movement. It is a non-profit organisation that selects teams, and raises funds to send Greek competitors to Paralympic events organised by the International Paralympic Committee (IPC).

== Goals/Objectives ==
The Hellenic Paralympic Committee (H.P.E.) is the body responsible for the development and dissemination of the Paralympic Movement in Greece as well as for the selection, formation and dispatch of national teams to the Paralympic Games.

Its main goal is the expansion of the Paralympic Movement in Greece and in this context, it gives incentives to motivate and encourage people with disabilities - and especially young people - to actively participate in sports, through their daily involvement in it.

== See also ==
- Greece at the Paralympics
