= Brazil at the 2016 Summer Paralympics =

- IPC code: BRA
- NPC: Brazilian Paralympic Committee
- Website: www.cpb.org.br

in Rio de Janeiro
- Competitors: 285 in 22 sports
- Flag bearers: Shirlene Coelho (opening); Ricardo Steinmetz Alves (closing)
- Medals Ranked 8th: Gold 14 Silver 29 Bronze 29 Total 72

Summer Paralympics appearances (overview)
- 1972; 1976; 1980; 1984; 1988; 1992; 1996; 2000; 2004; 2008; 2012; 2016; 2020; 2024

Brazil competed in the 2016 Summer Paralympics in Rio de Janeiro, as host country, from 7 September to 18 September 2016.

== Support ==
In September 2015, a representative from the country attended the Rio 2016 Paralympic Games Chef de Mission seminar as part of the country's preparation efforts for the 2016 Games.

== Disability classifications ==
Every participant at the Paralympics has their disability grouped into one of five disability categories; amputation, the condition may be congenital or sustained through injury or illness; cerebral palsy; wheelchair athletes, there is often overlap between this and other categories; visual impairment, including blindness; Les autres, any physical disability that does not fall strictly under one of the other categories, for example dwarfism or multiple sclerosis. Each Paralympic sport then has its own classifications, dependent upon the specific physical demands of competition. Events are given a code, made of numbers and letters, describing the type of event and classification of the athletes competing. Some sports, such as athletics, divide athletes by both the category and severity of their disabilities, other sports, for example swimming, group competitors from different categories together, the only separation being based on the severity of the disability.

== Medalists ==
| Medal | Name | Sport | Event | Date |
|---|---|---|---|---|
| Gold | Ricardo Costa de Oliveira | Athletics | Men's Long jump T11 | September 8 |
| Gold | Daniel Dias | Swimming | Men's 200 m freestyle S5 | September 8 |
| Gold | Daniel Martins | Athletics | Men's 400 m T20 | September 9 |
| Gold | Claudiney Batista dos Santos | Athletics | Men's Discus throw F56 | September 10 |
| Gold | Shirlene Coelho | Athletics | Women's Javelin throw F37 | September 10 |
| Gold | Petrúcio Ferreira dos Santos | Athletics | Men's 100 m T47 | September 11 |
| Gold | Alessandro Rodrigo Silva | Athletics | Men's Discus throw F11 | September 12 |
| Gold | Antônio Leme; Evelyn de Oliveira; Evani Soares da Silva | Boccia | Mixed Pairs BC3 | September 12 |
| Gold | Daniel Dias | Swimming | Men's 50 m backstroke S5 | September 12 |
| Gold | Gustavo Henrique Araújo; Felipe Gomes; Ricardo Costa de Oliveira; Daniel Silva; Diogo Ualisson Jerônimo da Silva; Kesley Teodoro | Athletics | Men's 4 × 100 m relay T11-T13 | September 13 |
| Gold | Silvânia Costa de Oliveira | Athletics | Women's Long jump T11 | September 16 |
| Gold | Daniel Dias | Swimming | Men's 50 m freestyle S5 | September 16 |
| Gold | Brazil men's national football 5-a-side team: Luan de Lacerda Gonçalves; Cássio Lopes dos Reis; Damião Robson Sousa Ramos; Jeferson Gonçalves; Ricardo Steinmetz Alves; Tiago da Silva; Raimundo Nonato Alves Mendes; Marcos José Alves Felipe; Maurício Tchopi; Vinícius Tranchezzi Holzsauer | Football 5-a-side | Men's tournament | September 17 |
| Gold | Daniel Dias | Swimming | Men's 100 m freestyle S5 | September 17 |
| Silver | Odair Santos | Athletics | Men's 5000 m T11 | September 8 |
| Silver | Fábio da Silva Bordignon | Athletics | Men's 100 m T35 | September 9 |
| Silver | Verônica Hipólito | Athletics | Women's 100 m T38 | September 9 |
| Silver | Lúcia da Silva Teixeira | Judo | Women's 57 kg | September 9 |
| Silver | Phelipe Rodrigues | Swimming | Men's 50 m freestyle S10 | September 9 |
| Silver | Daniel Dias; Talisson Glock; Clodoaldo Silva; Patricia Pereira dos Santos; Susana Ribeiro; Joana Maria Silva | Swimming | Mixed 4 × 50 m freestyle relay 20pts | September 9 |
| Silver | Alana Martins Maldonado | Judo | Women's 70 kg | September 10 |
| Silver | Antônio Tenório Silva | Judo | Men's 100 kg | September 10 |
| Silver | Wilians Silva de Araújo | Judo | Men's +100 kg | September 10 |
| Silver | Felipe Gomes | Athletics | Men's 100 m T11 | September 11 |
| Silver | Daniel Dias | Swimming | Men's 100 m breaststroke SB4 | September 11 |
| Silver | Fábio da Silva Bordignon | Athletics | Men's 200 m T35 | September 12 |
| Silver | Rodrigo Parreira da Silva | Athletics | Men's Long jump T36 | September 12 |
| Silver | Renato Nunes da Cruz; Yohansson Nascimento; Alan Fonteles Cardoso Oliveira; Petrúcio Ferreira dos Santos | Athletics | Men's 4 × 100 m relay T42-T47 | September 12 |
| Silver | Dirceu Pinto; Eliseu dos Santos; Marcelo dos Santos | Boccia | Mixed Pairs BC4 | September 12 |
| Silver | Joana Maria Silva | Swimming | Women's 50 m freestyle S5 | September 12 |
| Silver | Israel Pereira Stroh | Table tennis | Men Individual C7 | September 12 |
| Silver | Evânio da Silva | Powerlifting | Men's –88 kg | September 13 |
| Silver | Odair Santos | Athletics | Men's 1500 m T11 | September 13 |
| Silver | Mateus Evangelista Cardoso | Athletics | Men's Long jump T37 | September 13 |
| Silver | André Brasil | Swimming | Men's 100 m freestyle S10 | September 13 |
| Silver | Alice de Oliveira Côrrea; Terezinha Guilhermina; Lorena Salvatini Spoladore; Thalita Vitória Simplício da Silva | Athletics | Women's 4 × 100 m relay T11-T13 | September 14 |
| Silver | Carlos Farrenberg | Swimming | Men's 50 m freestyle S13 | September 14 |
| Silver | Daniel Dias; André Brasil; Ruiter Silva; Phelipe Rodrigues | Swimming | Men's 4 × 100 m freestyle relay 34pts | September 14 |
| Silver | Felipe Gomes | Athletics | Men's 200 m T11 | September 15 |
| Silver | Lauro César Chaman | Cycling | Men's Road race C4–5 | September 17 |
| Silver | Shirlene Coelho | Athletics | Women's discus F38 | September 17 |
| Silver | Petrúcio Ferreira dos Santos | Athletics | Men's 400 m T47 | September 17 |
| Silver | Felipe Gomes | Athletics | Men's 400 m T11 | September 17 |
| Bronze | Ítalo Pereira | Swimming | Men's 100 m backstroke S7 | September 8 |
| Bronze | Izabela Campos | Athletics | Women's Discus throw F11 | September 9 |
| Bronze | Rodrigo Parreira da Silva | Athletics | Men's 100 m T36 | September 10 |
| Bronze | Daniel Dias | Swimming | Men's 50 m butterfly S5 | September 10 |
| Bronze | Matheus Rheine | Swimming | Men's 400 m freestyle S11 | September 10 |
| Bronze | Yohansson Nascimento | Athletics | Men's 100 m T47 | September 11 |
| Bronze | Teresinha de Jesus Correia dos Santos | Athletics | Women's 100 m T47 | September 11 |
| Bronze | André Brasil | Swimming | Men's 100 m butterfly S10 | September 12 |
| Bronze | Talisson Glock | Swimming | Men's 200 m individual medley SM6 | September 12 |
| Bronze | Edson Pinheiro | Athletics | Men's 100 m T38 | September 13 |
| Bronze | Phelipe Rodrigues | Swimming | Men's 100 m freestyle S10 | September 13 |
| Bronze | Bruna Costa Alexandre | Table tennis | Women Individual C10 | September 13 |
| Bronze | Verônica Hipólito | Athletics | Women's 400 m T38 | September 14 |
| Bronze | Lauro César Chaman | Cycling | Men's Time trial C5 | September 14 |
| Bronze | Daniel Silva | Athletics | Men's 200 m T11 | September 15 |
| Bronze | Marivana Oliveira | Athletics | Women's Shot put F35 | September 15 |
| Bronze | Sérgio Fróes Ribeiro de Oliva | Equestrian | Men's Individual championship test grade Ia | September 15 |
| Bronze | Caio Ribeiro de Carvalho | Paracanoeing | Men's KL3 | September 15 |
| Bronze | Lorena Salvatini Spoladore | Athletics | Women's Long jump T11 | September 16 |
| Bronze | Terezinha Guilhermina | Athletics | Women's 400 m T11 | September 16 |
| Bronze | Sérgio Fróes Ribeiro de Oliva | Equestrian | Men's Individual freestyle test grade Ia | September 16 |
| Bronze | Brazil men's national football 7-a-side team: Marcos dos Santos Ferreira; Jônatas Santos Machado; Fernandes Alves Vieira; José Carlos Monteiro Guimarães; Diego Delgado da Silva; Fabrizio Nascimento de Oliveira; Igor Romero Rocha; Hudson Hyure do Carmo Januário; Wesley Martins de Souza; Wanderson Silva de Oliveira; Leandro Gonçalves do Amaral; Gilvano Diniz da Silva; Maycon Ferreira de Almeida; Felipe Rafael da Silva Gomes | Football 7-a-side | Men's Tournament | September 16 |
| Bronze | Brazil men's national goalball team: José Roberto Oliveira; Alex de Melo; Alexsander Celente; Leomon Moreno; Josemarcio Sousa; Romário Marques | Goalball | Men's Tournament | September 16 |
| Bronze | Bruna Costa Alexandre; Jennyfer Marques Parinos; Danielle Rauen | Table tennis | Women Team C6–10 | September 17 |
| Bronze | Aloisio Lima; Guilherme Marcião da Costa; Iranildo Conceição Espíndola | Table tennis | Men Team C1–2 | September 17 |
| Bronze | Brazil women's national sitting volleyball team: Paula Angeloti Herts; Edwarda de Oliveira Dias; Gizele Maria da Costa Dias; Adria Jesus da Silva; Pâmela Pereira; Camila Maria de Castro; Nathalie de Lima Silva; Suellen Cristine Lima; Jani Freitas Batista; Janaína Petit Cunha; Nurya de Almeida Silva; Laiana Rodrigues Batista | Sitting volleyball | Women's Tournament | September 17 |
| Bronze | Joana Maria Silva | Swimming | Women's 100 m freestyle S5 | September 17 |
| Bronze | Daniel Dias; Ruan Felipe Lima de Souza; André Brasil; Phelipe Rodrigues | Swimming | Men's 4 × 100 m medley 34 points | September 17 |
| Bronze | Edneusa Dorta | Athletics | Women's Marathon T12 | September 18 |

Medals by sport
| Sport | 1st place, gold medalist(s) | 2nd place, silver medalist(s) | 3rd place, bronze medalist(s) | Total |
| Athletics | 8 | 14 | 11 | 33 |
| Swimming | 4 | 7 | 8 | 19 |
| Boccia | 1 | 1 | 0 | 2 |
| Football 5-a-side | 1 | 0 | 0 | 1 |
| Judo | 0 | 4 | 0 | 4 |
| Table tennis | 0 | 1 | 3 | 4 |
| Cycling | 0 | 1 | 1 | 2 |
| Powerlifting | 0 | 1 | 0 | 1 |
| Equestrian | 0 | 0 | 2 | 2 |
| Football 7-a-side | 0 | 0 | 1 | 1 |
| Goalball | 0 | 0 | 1 | 1 |
| Paracanoeing | 0 | 0 | 1 | 1 |
| Sitting volleyball | 0 | 0 | 1 | 1 |
| Total | 14 | 29 | 29 | 72 |

Medals by gender
| Gender | Gold medal | Silver medal | Bronze medal | Total |
| Male | 11 | 21 | 18 | 50 |
| Female | 2 | 6 | 11 | 19 |
| Mixed | 1 | 2 | 0 | 3 |
| Total | 14 | 29 | 29 | 72 |

== Archery ==
Brazil automatically gets four berths at the 2016 Paralympics as the host nation, but had the ability to qualify additional athletes. At the 2015 World Archery Para Championships, several archers did just that. Francisco Cordeiro did this in the recurve men's open third round, while Jane Karla Gogel did it in the compound women's open by reaching the quarterfinal and Fabíola Lorenzi Dergovics added an extra spot as a result of her performance in the recurve women's open Paralympic secondary tournament. At the Parapan Games Brasil secured more spots with Thais Carvalho in the recurve women's open with a silver medal and Luciano Rezende with a gold medal and Diogo de Souza with the fourth place in the recurve men's open. All members of Brazilian archery team are participating at their first Paralympic Games as Brasil never before qualified an archer for the Paralympic Games, only Jane Karla Gogel had participated in 2008 Beijing and the 2012 London Games in table tennis.

Men

| Athlete | Event | Ranking round | | Round of 32 | Round of 16 | Quarterfinals | Semifinals | Final / BM | |
| Athlete | Event | Score | Seed | Opposition Score | Opposition Score | Opposition Score | Opposition Score | Opposition Score | Rank |
|---|---|---|---|---|---|---|---|---|---|
| Andrey Muniz de Castro | Individual compound open | 661 | 20 | Lee O-s (KOR); W 140–139 | Stutzman (USA); W 142–141 | Shelby (USA); L 135–136 | did not advance | | 8 |
| Francisco Cordeiro | Individual recurve open | 594 | 17 | Phillips (GBR); L 2–6 | did not advance | | | | 17 |
| Luciano Rezende | Individual recurve open | 557 | 27 | Airoldi (ITA); W 6–0 | Zhao L (CHN); W 6–4 | Szarszewski (GER); W 6–4 | Netsiri (THA); L 0–6 | Ranjbarkivaj (IRI); L 1–7 | 4 |
| Diogo de Souza | Individual recurve open | 550 | 30 | Szarszewski (GER); L 1–7 | did not advance | | | | 17 |

Women

| Athlete | Event | Ranking round | | Round of 32 | Round of 16 | Quarterfinals | Semifinals | Final / BM | |
| Athlete | Event | Score | Seed | Opposition Score | Opposition Score | Opposition Score | Opposition Score | Opposition Score | Rank |
|---|---|---|---|---|---|---|---|---|---|
| Jane Karla Gogel | Individual compound open | 655 | 3 | Bye | Hirasawa (JPN); W 140–131 | Lin Y (CHN); L 139–141 | did not advance | | 5 |
| Thaís Silva Carvalho | Individual recurve open | 517 | 28 | Lin D (CHN); W 7–3 | Melle (LAT); L 4–6 | did not advance | | | 9 |
| Fabiola Dergovics | Individual recurve open | 551 | 20 | Khuthawisap (THA); L 4–6 | did not advance | | | | 17 |
| Patricia Layolle | Individual recurve open | 461 | 32 | Wu C (CHN); L 0–6 | did not advance | | | | 17 |

Mixed

| Athlete | Event | Ranking round | | Round of 16 | Quarterfinals | Semifinals | Final / BM | |
| Athlete | Event | Score | Seed | Opposition Score | Opposition Score | Opposition Score | Opposition Score | Rank |
|---|---|---|---|---|---|---|---|---|
| Andrey Muniz de Castro; Jane Karla Gogel | Mixed Team compound open | 1316 | 6 | Turkey (TUR); L 145–147 | did not advance | | | 7 |
| Francisco Cordeiro; Fabiola Dergovics | Mixed Team recurve open | 1145 | 12 | South Korea (KOR); W 5–1 | Italy (ITA); L 2–6 | did not advance | | 7 |

== Athletics ==
Petrúcio Ferreira is expected to be part of the Brazilian athletics delegation. When he was 18 years old, he broke the world record in the 200m T46/47 world record.

Terezinha Guilhermina will defend her three paralympic championships.

Key

- Note–Ranks given for track events are within the athlete's heat only
- DSQ = Disqualified
- DNS = Did not start
- DNF = Did not finish
- Q = Qualified for the next round
- q = Qualified for the next round as a fastest loser
- WR = World record
- PR = Paralympic record
- RR = Regional record
- NR = National record
- N/A = Round not applicable for the event
- Bye = Athlete not required to compete in round

Men's track

| Athlete | Events | Heat | | Semifinal | | Final | |
| Athlete | Events | Time | Rank | Time | Rank | Time | Rank |
|---|---|---|---|---|---|---|---|
| Gustavo Henrique Araújo | 100 m T13 | 11.16 | 4 q | —N/a | | 11.45 | 8 |
| Gustavo Henrique Araújo | 400 m T13 | 50.09 | 4 q | —N/a | | 50.06 | 6 |
| Fábio da Silva Bordignon | 100 m T35 | 12.78 RR | 1 Q | —N/a | | 12.66 RR | 2nd place, silver medalist(s) |
| Fábio da Silva Bordignon | 200 m T35 | 26.22 | 1 Q | —N/a | | 26.01 RR | 2nd place, silver medalist(s) |
| Mateus Evangelista Cardoso | 100 m T37 | 11.47 PR | 1 Q | —N/a | | 11.62 | 4 |
| Mateus Evangelista Cardoso | 400 m T37 | DNS | | —N/a | | did not advance | |
| Renato Nunes da Cruz | 100 m T44 | 11.79 | 8 | —N/a | | did not advance | |
| Felipe Gomes; Guide: Jonas de Lima Silva | 100 m T11 | 11.22 | 1 Q | 11.15 | 2 q | 11.08 | 2nd place, silver medalist(s) |
| Felipe Gomes; Guide: Jonas de Lima Silva | 200 m T11 | 23.00 | 1 Q | 22.50 | 1 Q | 22.52 | 2nd place, silver medalist(s) |
| Felipe Gomes; Guide: Jonas de Lima Silva | 400 m T11 | 51.26 | 1 Q | —N/a | | 50.38 | 2nd place, silver medalist(s) |
| Yeltsin Jacques | 1500 m T13 | —N/a | | | | 3:58.92 | 11 |
| Yeltsin Jacques | 5000 m T13 | —N/a | | | | 15:02.13 | 5 |
| Daniel Martins | 400 m T20 | 48.70 | 1 Q | —N/a | | 47.22 WR | 1st place, gold medalist(s) |
| Yohansson Nascimento | 100 m T47 | 10.75 | 1 Q | —N/a | | 10.79 | 3rd place, bronze medalist(s) |
| Yohansson Nascimento | 400 m T47 | DNS | | —N/a | | did not advance | |
| Alan Fonteles Cardoso Oliveira | 100 m T44 | 11.26 | 4 | —N/a | | did not advance | |
| Alan Fonteles Cardoso Oliveira | 200 m T44 | 22.63 | 5 | —N/a | | did not advance | |
| Alan Fonteles Cardoso Oliveira | 400 m T44 | DNS | | —N/a | | did not advance | |
| Ricardo Costa de Oliveira; Guide: Celio Miguel da Silva | 100 m T11 | 11.66 | 2 q | 11.44 | 2 | did not advance | |
| Paulo Pereira | 100 m T37 | 12.23 | 7 | —N/a | | did not advance | |
| Paulo Pereira | 400 m T37 | 54.36 | 4 | —N/a | | 54.67 | 5 |
| Edson Pinheiro | 100 m T38 | 11.32 | 2 Q | —N/a | | 11.26 | 3rd place, bronze medalist(s) |
| Lucas Prado; Guide: Adauto Galdino Ricardo | 100 m T11 | 11.64 | 2 q | DNS | | did not advance | |
| Lucas Prado; Guide: Adauto Galdino Ricardo | 200 m T11 | DNS | | —N/a | | did not advance | |
| Lucas Prado; Guide: Adauto Galdino Ricardo | 400 m T11 | DNS | | —N/a | | did not advance | |
| Odair Santos | 1500 m T11 | 4:05.34 | 2 q | —N/a | | 4:03.85 | 2nd place, silver medalist(s) |
| Odair Santos | 5000 m T11 | —N/a | | | | 15:17.55 | 2nd place, silver medalist(s) |
| Júlio Cesar Agripino dos Santos | 1500 m T13 | —N/a | | | | 4:00.61 | 12 |
| Júlio Cesar Agripino dos Santos | 5000 m T13 | —N/a | | | | DNF | |
| Petrúcio Ferreira dos Santos | 100 m T47 | 10.67 WR | 1 Q | —N/a | | 10.57 WR | 1st place, gold medalist(s) |
| Petrúcio Ferreira dos Santos | 400 m T47 | 49.96 | 1 Q | —N/a | | 48.87 | 2nd place, silver medalist(s) |
| Daniel Silva; Guide: Heitor de Oliveira Sales | 200 m T11 | 23.39 | 1 Q | 23.01 | 2 q | 23.04 | 3rd place, bronze medalist(s) |
| Daniel Silva; Guide: Heitor de Oliveira Sales | 400 m T11 | 51.96 | 1 Q | —N/a | | 50.93 | 4 |
| Ariosvaldo Fernandes da Silva | 100 m T53 | 14.69 PR | 1 Q | —N/a | | 14.88 | 4 |
| Ariosvaldo Fernandes da Silva | 400 m T53 | DSQ | | —N/a | | did not advance | |
| Diogo Ualisson Jerônimo da Silva | 100 m T12 | DSQ | | —N/a | | did not advance | |
| Diogo Ualisson Jerônimo da Silva | 200 m T12 | 23.01 | 3 | did not advance | | | |
| Rodrigo Parreira da Silva | 100 m T36 | —N/a | | | | 12.54 RR | 3rd place, bronze medalist(s) |
| Alex Douglas Pires da Silva | Marathon T46 | —N/a | | | | DNF | |
| Kesley Teodoro | 100 m T13 | 11.10 | 4 q | —N/a | | 11.00 | 4 |
| Kesley Teodoro | 400 m T13 | 53.27 | 4 | —N/a | | did not advance | |
| Gustavo Henrique Araújo; Felipe Gomes; Ricardo Costa de Oliveira; Daniel Silva; Diogo Ualisson Jerônimo da Silva; Kesley Teodoro | 4 × 100 m relay T11-T13 | 42.69 RR | 1 Q | —N/a | | 42.37 PR, RR | 1st place, gold medalist(s) |
| Renato Nunes da Cruz; Yohansson Nascimento; Alan Fonteles Cardoso Oliveira; Petrúcio Ferreira dos Santos | 4 × 100 m relay T42-T47 | —N/a | | | | 42.04 | 2nd place, silver medalist(s) |

Men's field

| Athlete | Event | Mark | Rank |
|---|---|---|---|
| Mateus Evangelista Cardoso | Long jump T37 | 6.53 RR | 2nd place, silver medalist(s) |
| Márcio Leite | Discus throw F11 | 34.71 | 5 |
| Cícero Nobre | Javelin throw F56–57 | 42,90 RR | 4 |
| Ricardo Nunes | Shot put F54–55 | DNS | |
| Ricardo Costa de Oliveira | Long jump T11 | 6.52 | 1st place, gold medalist(s) |
| Caio Vinícius da Silva Pereira | Shot put F11–12 | 15.23 | 5 |
| Edson Pinheiro | Long jump T38 | 4.89 | 8 |
| Flávio Reitz | High jump T42 | 1.71 | 9 |
| José Rodrigues | Javelin throw F53–54 | 23.41 | 4 |
| Wallace Santos | Shot put F54–55 | 9.19 | 10 |
| Jonathan de Souza Santos | Shot put F41 | 11.71 | 4 |
| Claudiney Batista dos Santos | Discus throw F56 | 45.33 PR, RR | 1st place, gold medalist(s) |
| Claudiney Batista dos Santos | Javelin throw F56–57 | 42.74 WR | 5 |
| Jeohsah Beserra dos Santos | High jump T44 | 1.85 | 6 |
| Thiago Paulino dos Santos | Shot put F56–57 | 13.92 | 5 |
| Edevaldo Silva | Javelin throw F42–44 | 53.74 | 7 |
| Alessandro Rodrigo Silva | Shot put F11–12 | 12.43 | 10 |
| Alessandro Rodrigo Silva | Discus throw F11 | 43.06 PR | 1st place, gold medalist(s) |
| João Victor Teixeira de Souza Silva | Shot put F37 | 13.54 RR | 5 |
| João Victor Teixeira de Souza Silva | Discus throw F37 | 45.10 | 7 |
| Rodrigo Parreira da Silva | Long jump T36 | 5.62 PR, RR | 2nd place, silver medalist(s) |
| Mauro Evaristo de Sousa | Shot put F42 | 13.59 RR | 4 |

Women's track

| Athlete | Events | Heat | | Semifinal | | Final | |
| Athlete | Events | Time | Rank | Time | Rank | Time | Rank |
|---|---|---|---|---|---|---|---|
| Maria de Fátima Fonseca Chaves | 1500 m T54 | 3:37.16 | 8 | —N/a | | did not advance | |
| Maria de Fátima Fonseca Chaves | 5000 m T54 | 12:08.52 | 7 q | —N/a | | 12:06.15 | 9 |
| Maria de Fátima Fonseca Chaves | Marathon T54 | —N/a | | | | DNF | |
| Alice de Oliveira Côrrea; Guide: Diogo Cardoso da Silva | 100 m T12 | 12.31 | 1 Q | 12.20 | 2 q | 12.26 | 4 |
| Alice de Oliveira Côrrea; Guide: Diogo Cardoso da Silva | 200 m T12 | 25.12 | 3 | —N/a | | did not advance | |
| Tascitha Oliveira Cruz | 100 m T36 | 14.53 | 1 Q | —N/a | | 15.28 | 6 |
| Tascitha Oliveira Cruz | 200 m T36 | 31.39 | 3 Q | —N/a | | 31.34 | 5 |
| Edneusa de Jesus Santos Dorta | Marathon T12 | —N/a | | | | 3:18:38 | 3rd place, bronze medalist(s) |
| Sheila Finder | 100 m T47 | 13.09 | 3 Q | —N/a | | 13.27 | 6 |
| Terezinha Guilhermina; Guides: Rafael Lazarini / Rodrigo Chieregatto | 100 m T11 | 12.19 | 2 q | 12.10 | 3 q | DSQ | |
| Terezinha Guilhermina; Guides: Rafael Lazarini / Rodrigo Chieregatto | 200 m T11 | 25.07 | 1 Q | 24.86 | 1 Q | DSQ | |
| Terezinha Guilhermina; Guides: Rafael Lazarini / Rodrigo Chieregatto | 400 m T11 | 57.87 | 1 Q | —N/a | | 57.97 | 3rd place, bronze medalist(s) |
| Verônica Hipólito | 100 m T38 | 12.84 PR, RR | 1 Q | —N/a | | 12.88 | 2nd place, silver medalist(s) |
| Verônica Hipólito | 400 m T38 | —N/a | | | | 1:03.14 RR | 3rd place, bronze medalist(s) |
| Aline Rocha | 1500 m T54 | 3:30.40 | 6 q | —N/a | | 3:27.61 | 9 |
| Aline Rocha | 5000 m T54 | 12:16.03 | 5 | —N/a | | did not advance | |
| Aline Rocha | Marathon T54 | —N/a | | | | 1:43:01 | 10 |
| Thalita Vitória Simplício da Silva; Guide: Felipe Veloso | 400 m T11 | 58.71 | 1 Q | —N/a | | DSQ | |
| Jerusa Geber Santos; Guide: Guilherme Soares de Santana | 100 m T11 | 12.34 | 1 Q | 12.23 | 2 | did not advance | |
| Jerusa Geber Santos; Guide: Guilherme Soares de Santana | 200 m T11 | 26.60 | 1 Q | 25.76 | 3 | did not advance | |
| Jenifer Santos | 100 m T38 | 13.62 | 4 q | —N/a | | 13.61 | 8 |
| Jhulia Santos; Guide: Justino Santos | 200 m T11 | 26.59 | 2 Q | 26.42 | 3 | did not advance | |
| Teresinha de Jesus Correia dos Santos | 100 m T47 | 12.86 | 3 Q | —N/a | | 12.84 | 3rd place, bronze medalist(s) |
| Teresinha de Jesus Correia dos Santos | 200 m T47 | DNS | | —N/a | | did not advance | |
| Teresinha de Jesus Correia dos Santos | 400 m T47 | 1:01.88 | 2 Q | —N/a | | DNS | |
| Ana Cláudia Maria da Silva | 100 m T42 | 16.42 | 3 Q | —N/a | | 16.43 | 4 |
| Lorena Salvatini Spoladore; Guide: Renato Ben Hur Oliveira | 100 m T11 | 12.49 | 1 Q | 12.38 | 3 | did not advance | |
| Lorena Salvatini Spoladore; Guide: Renato Ben Hur Oliveira | 400 m T11 | DNS | | —N/a | | did not advance | |
| Renata Bazone Teixeira; Guide: Fernando Ribeiro Junior | 1500 m T11 | 5:06.09 | 3 q | —N/a | | 5:01.75 | 4 |
| Alice de Oliveira Côrrea; Terezinha Guilhermina; Lorena Salvatini Spoladore; Thalita Vitória Simplício da Silva | 4 × 100 m relay T11-T13 | —N/a | | | | 47.57 RR | 2nd place, silver medalist(s) |

Women's field

| Athlete | Event | Mark | Rank |
|---|---|---|---|
| Izabela Campos | Shot put F11–12 | 10.11 | 11 |
| Izabela Campos | Discus throw F11 | 32.60 | 3rd place, bronze medalist(s) |
| Sheila Finder | Long jump T47 | 5.00 | 9 |
| Shirlene Coelho | Shot put F37 | 10.91 RR | 4 |
| Shirlene Coelho | Discus throw F37–38 | 33.91 RR | 2nd place, silver medalist(s) |
| Shirlene Coelho | Javelin throw F37 | 37.57 | 1st place, gold medalist(s) |
| Verônica Hipólito | Long jump T38 | 4.37 | 8 |
| Poliana Jesus | Shot put F54 | 5.70 | 6 |
| Poliana Jesus | Javelin throw F53–54 | 13.96 | 5 |
| Raíssa Rocha Machado | Javelin throw F55–56 | 18.57 | 6 |
| Marivana Oliveira | Shot put F35 | 9.28 RR | 3rd place, bronze medalist(s) |
| Silvânia Costa de Oliveira | Long jump T11 | 4.98 | 1st place, gold medalist(s) |
| Kelly Cristina Peixoto | Shot put F41 | 7.94 RR | 5 |
| Roseane Santos | Shot put F56–57 | 8.36 | 7 |
| Roseane Santos | Discus throw F56–57 | 25.16 | 7 |
| Thalita Vitória Simplício da Silva | Long jump T11 | 4.54 | 5 |
| Ana Cláudia Maria da Silva | Long jump T42 | 3.62 | 5 |
| Jenifer Santos | Long jump T38 | 4.43 | 7 |
| Lorena Salvatini Spoladore | Long jump T11 | 4.71 | 3rd place, bronze medalist(s) |

== Boccia ==
Brazil qualified for the 2016 Summer Paralympics in this sport at the Montreal hosted 2015 BisFed Americas Pair and Team championship in the Pairs BC3 event. They claimed gold ahead of silver medalist Canada and bronze medalists Colombia. Dirceu Pinto goes to the Rio Games as the reigning 2008 and 2012 individual BC4 and pairs BC4 gold medalist.

Individual

| Athlete | Event | Pool matches | | | | Quarterfinals | Semifinals | Final / BM | |
| Athlete | Event | Opposition Score | Opposition Score | Opposition Score | Rank | Opposition Score | Opposition Score | Opposition Score | Rank |
|---|---|---|---|---|---|---|---|---|---|
| José Carlos Chagas | Mixed individual BC1 | Sun K (CHN); W 3–2 | Fujii (JPN); W 5–1 | Tadtong (THA); L 1–8 | 2 Q | Marques (POR); L 3–4 | did not advance | | 6 |
| Lucas de Araújo | Mixed individual BC2 | Valente (POR); L 1–4 | Zhong K (CHN); W 9–0 | —N/a | 2 | did not advance | | | 10 |
| Maciel Santos | Mixed individual BC2 | Gonzalez (ARG); W 7–2 | Jeong SY (KOR); L 3–4 | —N/a | 2 | did not advance | | | 11 |
| Antônio Leme | Mixed individual BC3 | Toh SN (SIN); L 2–6 | Bjurstroem (SWE); L 0–5 | —N/a | 3 | did not advance | | | 23 |
| Evelyn de Oliveira | Mixed individual BC3 | Vasicek (CZE); W 6–1 | Costa (POR); W 6–1 | —N/a | 1 Q | Jeong HW (KOR); L 0–6 | did not advance | | 7 |
| Dirceu Pinto | Mixed individual BC4 | Lau WY (HKG); L 2–9 | Clara (POR); L 5–6 | Maguire (GBR); W 6–2 | 4 | did not advance | | | 13 |
| Eliseu dos Santos | Mixed individual BC4 | Steer (GBR); W 10–0 | Andrejcik (SVK); L 1–7 | Larpyen (THA); L 2–5 | 3 | did not advance | | | 10 |

Pairs and teams

| Athlete | Event | Pool matches | | | | Quarterfinals | Semifinals | Final / BM | |
| Athlete | Event | Opposition Score | Opposition Score | Opposition Score | Rank | Opposition Score | Opposition Score | Opposition Score | Rank |
|---|---|---|---|---|---|---|---|---|---|
| Lucas de Araújo; Guilherme Moraes; José Carlos Chagas; Maciel Santos | Mixed team BC1-2 | Hong Kong (HKG); W 5–4 | Spain (ESP); W 8–1 | —N/a | 1 Q | Portugal (POR); L 5–6 | did not advance | | 6 |
| Antônio Leme; Evelyn de Oliveira; Evani Soares da Silva | Mixed pairs BC3 | Belgium (BEL); W 4–2 | Canada (CAN); W 11–2 | South Korea (KOR); L 1–4 | 2 Q | —N/a | Singapore (SIN); W 6–2 | South Korea (KOR); W 5–2 | 1st place, gold medalist(s) |
| Dirceu Pinto; Eliseu dos Santos; Marcelo dos Santos | Mixed pairs BC4 | Canada (CAN); W 4–3 | Thailand (THA); L 2–4 | China (CHN); W 4–4 TBW | 2 Q | —N/a | Great Britain (GBR); W 4–2 | Slovakia (SVK); L 2–4 | 2nd place, silver medalist(s) |

== Cycling ==
=== Road ===
| Athlete | Event | Time | Rank |
|---|---|---|---|
| Lauro César Chaman | Men's road race C4–5 | 2:13.46 | 2nd place, silver medalist(s) |
| Lauro César Chaman | Men's time trial C5 | 37:37.43 | 3rd place, bronze medalist(s) |
| Soelito Gohr | Men's road race C4–5 | 2:24.25 | 14 |
| Soelito Gohr | Men's time trial C5 | 40:49.70 | 9 |
| Márcia Fanhani; Pilot: Mariane Ferreira | Women's road race B | 2:29.15 | 15 |
| Márcia Fanhani; Pilot: Mariane Ferreira | Women's time trial B | 48:00.36 | 16 |
| Jady Martins Malavazzy | Women's road race H1–4 | 1:27.19 | 10 |
| Jady Martins Malavazzy | Women's time trial H1–3 | 35:33.29 | 6 |

=== Track ===
| Athlete | Event | Qualification | | Final | |
| Athlete | Event | Time | Rank | Opposition Time | Rank |
|---|---|---|---|---|---|
| Lauro César Chaman | Men's individual pursuit C5 | 4:41.697 | 4 Q | 4:43.257 | 4 |
| Lauro César Chaman | Men's time trial C4–5 | —N/a | | 1:09.423 | 12 |
| Soelito Gohr | Men's individual pursuit C5 | 4:58.969 | 9 | did not advance | |
| Soelito Gohr | Men's time trial C4–5 | —N/a | | 1:13.425 | 18 |
| Márcia Fanhani; Pilot: Mariane Ferreira | Women's individual pursuit B | 4:10.058 | 13 | did not advance | |
| Márcia Fanhani; Pilot: Mariane Ferreira | Women's time trial pursuit B | —N/a | | 1:22.354 | 13 |

== Equestrian ==
Individual

| Athlete | Horse | Event | Total | |
| Athlete | Horse | Event | Score | Rank |
|---|---|---|---|---|
| Vera Lúcia Martins Mazzilli | Ballantine | Individual championship test grade Ia | 67.130 | 18 |
| Sérgio Fróes Ribeiro de Oliva | Coco Chanel | Individual championship test grade Ia | 73.826 | 3rd place, bronze medalist(s) |
| Sérgio Fróes Ribeiro de Oliva | Coco Chanel | Individual freestyle test grade Ia | 75.150 | 3rd place, bronze medalist(s) |
| Marcos Fernandes Alves | Vladimir | Individual championship test grade Ib | 68.897 | 6 |
| Marcos Fernandes Alves | Vladimir | Individual freestyle test grade Ib | 67.700 | 7 |
| Rodolpho Riskalla | Warenne | Individual championship test grade III | 68.366 | 10 |

Team

| Athlete | Horse | Event | Individual score | | | Total | |
| Athlete | Horse | Event | TT | CT | Total | Score | Rank |
|---|---|---|---|---|---|---|---|
| Marcos Fernandes Alves | See above | Team | 66.840 | 68.897 | 135.737 | 418.693 | 7 |
| Vera Lúcia Martins Mazzilli | See above | Team | 68.913 | 67.130 | 136.043 | 418.693 | 7 |
| Sérgio Fróes Ribeiro de Oliva | See above | Team | 73.087 | 73.826 | 146.913 | 418.693 | 7 |
| Rodolpho Riskalla | See above | Team | 66.737 | 68.366 | 135.103 # | 418.693 | 7 |

# Discarded score.

== Football 5-a-side ==
Brazil qualified for the Paralympics by virtue of being hosts. They also qualified in their own right by winning the IBSA Blind Football World Championships 2014 in Tokyo, Japan. They would also have qualified by virtue of winning the 2015 Parapan American Games in Toronto, Canada, the regional qualifier for the Americas.

The following is the Brazil squad in the football 5-a-side tournament of the 2016 Summer Paralympics.

| No. | Pos. | Player | Class | Date of birth (age) |
|---|---|---|---|---|
| 1 | GK | Luan | Sighted | 6 January 1993 (aged 23) |
| 3 | DF | Cássio | B1 | 15 May 1989 (aged 27) |
| 5 | DF | Damião | B1 | 28 December 1974 (aged 41) |
| 6 | FW | Tiago | B1 | 28 September 1995 (aged 20) |
| 7 | MF | Jefinho | B1 | 5 October 1989 (aged 26) |
| 8 | FW | Nonato | B1 | 19 August 1987 (aged 29) |
| 9 | MF | Marcos Felipe | B1 | 14 October 1981 (aged 34) |
| 10 | MF | Ricardinho | B1 | 15 December 1988 (aged 27) |
| 11 | DF | Maurício Dumbo | B1 | 25 December 1989 (aged 26) |
| 12 | GK | Vinícius | Sighted | 1 August 1993 (aged 23) |

Group stage

| Pos | Team | Pld | W | D | L | GF | GA | GD | Pts | Qualification |
|---|---|---|---|---|---|---|---|---|---|---|
| 1 | Brazil (H) | 3 | 2 | 1 | 0 | 5 | 1 | +4 | 7 | Semi finals |
| 2 | Iran | 3 | 1 | 2 | 0 | 2 | 0 | +2 | 5 | Semi finals |
| 3 | Turkey | 3 | 0 | 2 | 1 | 1 | 3 | −2 | 2 | 5th–6th place match |
| 4 | Morocco | 3 | 0 | 1 | 2 | 2 | 6 | −4 | 1 | 7th–8th place match |

Source: Paralympic.org
(H) Hosts
9 September 2016
9:00

| Brazil | 3–1 | Morocco |
|---|---|---|
| Ricardinho 31'; Jefinho 36'; Nonato 36' | Report | Hattab 13' |

Olympic Tennis Centre, Rio de Janeiro
Attendance: 2,569
Referee: Mariano Travaglino (Argentina)

11 September 2016
16:00

| Brazil | 2–0 | Turkey |
|---|---|---|
| Ricardinho 13'; Cássio 37' (pen.) | Report |

Olympic Tennis Centre, Rio de Janeiro
Attendance: 2,596
Referee: François Carcouët (France)

13 September 2016
9:00

| Brazil | 0–0 | Iran |
|---|---|---|
| | Report |

Olympic Tennis Centre, Rio de Janeiro
Attendance: 2,355
Referee: Mariano Travaglino (Argentina)

Semifinal

15 September 2016
16:00

| Brazil | 2–1 | China |
|---|---|---|
| Jefinho 20', 30' | Report | Wang Y. 14' |

Olympic Tennis Centre, Rio de Janeiro
Attendance: 3,026
Referee: Mariano Travaglino (Argentina)

Gold medal match

17 September 2016
17:00

| Brazil | 1–0 | Iran |
|---|---|---|
| Ricardinho 12' | Report |

Olympic Tennis Centre, Rio de Janeiro
Attendance: 3,118
Referee: Mariano Travaglino (Argentina)

== Football 7-a-side ==
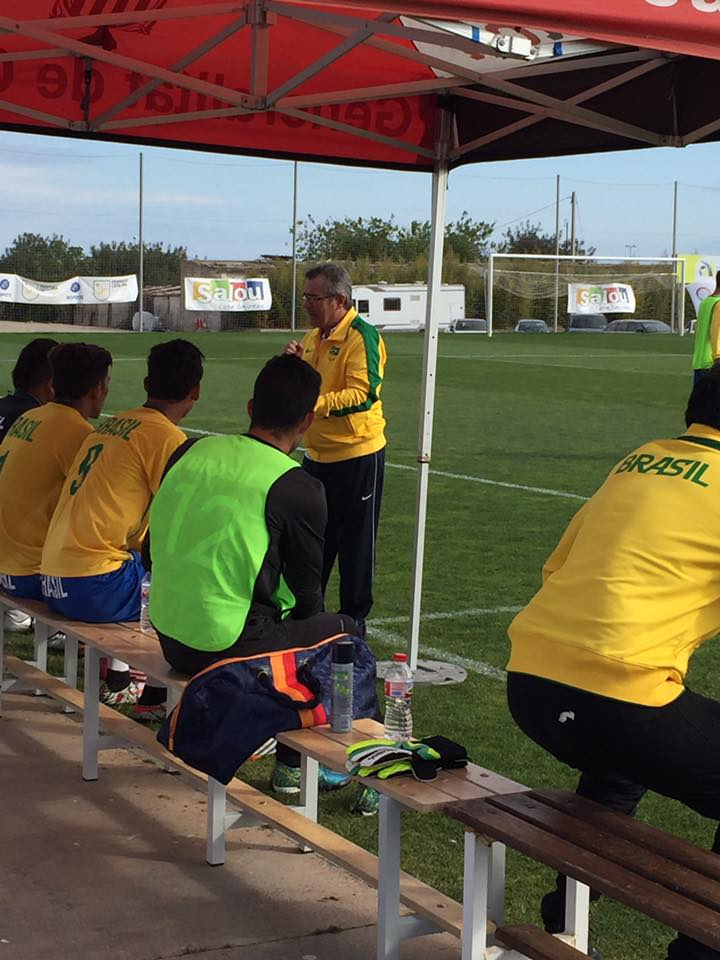
Brazil during halftime at a game in the IFCPF Pre Paralympic Tournament Salou 2016, the last major preparation tournament for the Rio Games.

Brazil automatically qualified as the host country. Jan Francisco Brito da Costa is the best player for Brazil, and dominated at the 2015 World Championships. His team finished third at the 2015 CP Football World Championships.

The draw for the tournament was held on May 6 at the 2016 Pre Paralympic Tournament in Salou, Spain. Brazil was put into Group A with Ukraine, Great Britain and Ireland. The tournament where the draw took place featured 7 of the 8 teams participating in Rio. It was the last major preparation event ahead of the Rio Games for all teams participating. Brazil finished second, after losing 0 - 2 to Ukraine in the 1st place match.

Going into the Rio Games, the country was ranked third in the world.

| # | Pos. | Player | Class | Date of birth (age) | Club |
|---|---|---|---|---|---|
| 1 | GK | Marcos dos Santos Ferreira (C) | FT7 | July 4, 1978 (aged 38) | (Brazil) CAIRA |
| 2 | DF | Jônatas Santos Machado | FT7 | October 25, 1992 (aged 23) | (Brazil) Vasco da Gama |
| 3 | DF | Fernandes Alves Vieira | FT7 | September 6, 1979 (aged 37) | (Brazil) Vasco da Gama |
| 4 | FW | José Carlos Monteiro Guimarães | FT6 | May 22, 1978 (aged 38) | (Brazil) ANDEF |
| 5 | DF | Diego Delgado da Silva | FT7 | March 4, 1996 (aged 20) | (Brazil) Vasco da Gama |
| 6 | DF | Fabrizio Nascimento de Oliveira | FT7 | January 17, 1996 (aged 20) | (Brazil) CAIRA |
| 7 | DF | Igor Romero Rocha | FT7 | February 16, 1996 (aged 20) | (Brazil) Vasco da Gama |
| 8 | MF | Hudson Hyure do Carmo Januário | FT7 | October 5, 1996 (aged 19) | (Brazil) Vasco da Gama |
| 9 | FW | Wesley Martins de Souza | FT5 | October 3, 1989 (aged 26) | (Brazil) CAIRA |
| 10 | FW | Wanderson Silva de Oliveira | FT8 | August 27, 1987 (aged 29) | (Brazil) ANDEF |
| 11 | MF | Leandro Gonçalves do Amaral | FT7 | April 1, 1993 (aged 23) | (Brazil) CAIRA |
| 12 | GK | Gilvano Diniz da Silva | FT7 | March 27, 1984 (aged 32) | (Brazil) Vasco da Gama |
| 13 | MF | Maycon Ferreira de Almeida | FT7 | March 1, 1990 (aged 26) | (Brazil) CAIRA |
| 14 | DF | Felipe Rafael da Silva Gomes | FT8 | June 21, 1994 (aged 22) | (Brazil) Vasco da Gama |

Group stage

| Pos | Team | Pld | W | D | L | GF | GA | GD | Pts | Qualification |
|---|---|---|---|---|---|---|---|---|---|---|
| 1 | Ukraine | 3 | 3 | 0 | 0 | 10 | 2 | +8 | 9 | Semi finals |
| 2 | Brazil (H) | 3 | 2 | 0 | 1 | 10 | 4 | +6 | 6 | Semi finals |
| 3 | Great Britain | 3 | 1 | 0 | 2 | 7 | 5 | +2 | 3 | 5th–6th place match |
| 4 | Ireland | 3 | 0 | 0 | 3 | 2 | 18 | −16 | 0 | 7th–8th place match |

Source: Paralympic.org
(H) Hosts
8 September 2016
10:00

| Brazil | 2–1 | Great Britain |
|---|---|---|
| Leandrinho 10'; Maycon 22' | Report | Porcher 33' |

Deodoro Stadium, Rio de Janeiro
Attendance: 2,320
Referee: Jorge Barbisan (Argentina)

10 September 2016
19:00

| Ireland | 1–7 | Brazil |
|---|---|---|
| Sheridan 50' | Report | Wanderson 5', 49'; Leandrinho 17', 53'; Diego 20'; Fabrizio 34', 41' |

Deodoro Stadium, Rio de Janeiro
Attendance: 11,059
Referee: Skye Arthur-Banning (Canada)

12 September 2016
19:00

| Ukraine | 2–1 | Brazil |
|---|---|---|
| Krasylnykov 7'; Kahramanian 24' | Report | Wesley 59' |

Deodoro Stadium, Rio de Janeiro
Attendance: 7,044
Referee: Ross Haswell (Great Britain)

Semifinal

14 September 2016
19:00

| Iran | 5–0 | Brazil |
|---|---|---|
| Atashafrouz 14'; Jamali 30', 37', 53'; Tiz Bor 48' | Report |

Deodoro Stadium, Rio de Janeiro
Attendance: 3,965
Referee: Ross Haswell (Great Britain)

Bronze medal match

16 September 2016
14:00

| Netherlands | 1–3 | Brazil |
|---|---|---|
| Schuitert 54' | Report | Leandrinho 1', 49', 56' |

Deodoro Stadium, Rio de Janeiro
Attendance: 6,737
Referee: Jorge Barbisan (Argentina)

== Goalball ==
Summary

| Team | Event | Group stage | | | | | Quarterfinal | Semifinal | Final / BM / Cl. | |
| Team | Event | Opposition Score | Opposition Score | Opposition Score | Opposition Score | Rank | Opposition Score | Opposition Score | Opposition Score | Rank |
|---|---|---|---|---|---|---|---|---|---|---|
| Brazil men's | Men's tournament | Sweden; W 9–6 | Canada; W 11–3 | Algeria; W 12–2 | Germany; W 10–4 | 1 Q | China; W 10–3 | United States; L 1–10 | Bronze medal match Sweden; W 6–5 | 3rd place, bronze medalist(s) |
| Brazil women's | Women's tournament | United States; W 7–3 | Japan; L 1–2 | Israel; W 7–2 | Algeria; W 10–0 | 1 Q | Ukraine; W 10–0 | China; L 3–4 | Bronze medal match United States; L 2–3 | 4 |

=== Men ===
Romário Diego Marques is one of the members of the Brazil men's national goalball team. He is expected to be on the roster for Rio, after having been part of the silver medal-winning team at the 2012 Summer Paralympics and the gold medal-winning team at the 2014 IBSA Goalball World Championships. The team automatically qualified as hosts, but they would have qualified in their own right as winners of the 2014 IBSA Goalball World Championships. Brazil's men enter the tournament ranked 5th in the world.

The following is the Brazil roster in the men's goalball tournament of the 2016 Summer Paralympics.

| No. | Player | Class | Date of birth (age) |
|---|---|---|---|
| 1 | José Roberto Oliveira | B1 | 2 April 1981 (aged 35) |
| 2 | Alex de Melo | B2 | 10 December 1994 (aged 21) |
| 3 | Alexsander Celente | B1 | 21 December 1980 (aged 35) |
| 4 | Leomon Moreno | B1 | 21 August 1993 (aged 23) |
| 5 | Josemarcio Sousa | B3 | 8 September 1995 (aged 21) |
| 6 | Romário Marques | B1 | 20 July 1989 (aged 27) |

Group stage

| Pos | Team | Pld | W | D | L | GF | GA | GD | Pts | Qualification |
|---|---|---|---|---|---|---|---|---|---|---|
| 1 | Brazil (H) | 4 | 4 | 0 | 0 | 42 | 15 | +27 | 12 | Quarter-finals |
| 2 | Sweden | 4 | 3 | 0 | 1 | 33 | 23 | +10 | 9 | Quarter-finals |
| 3 | Germany | 4 | 1 | 0 | 3 | 24 | 26 | −2 | 3 | Quarter-finals |
| 4 | Canada | 4 | 1 | 0 | 3 | 26 | 39 | −13 | 3 | Quarter-finals |
| 5 | Algeria | 4 | 1 | 0 | 3 | 25 | 47 | −22 | 3 | |

Source: Paralympic.org
(H) Hosts

| 8 September 2016; 09:00 | Brazil | 9–6 | Sweden | Future Arena, Rio de Janeiro; Referees: Bülent Kimyon (TUR), Patricia Fras (SLO) |
| 8 September 2016; 09:00 | Moreno 5 Sousa 2 Marques 1 Celente 1 | Report | Björkstrand 5 Seremeti 1 | Future Arena, Rio de Janeiro; Referees: Bülent Kimyon (TUR), Patricia Fras (SLO) |

| 9 September 2016; 13:15 | Canada | 3–11 | Brazil | Future Arena, Rio de Janeiro; Referees: Patricia Fras (SLO), Nejc Jakic (SLO) |
| 9 September 2016; 13:15 | Hache 2 Ripley 1 | Report | Marques 4 de Melo 3 Moreno 2 Sousa 1 Celente 1 | Future Arena, Rio de Janeiro; Referees: Patricia Fras (SLO), Nejc Jakic (SLO) |

| 11 September 2016; 09:00 | Brazil | 12–2 | Algeria | Future Arena, Rio de Janeiro; Referees: Alexander Knecht (GER), Bülent Kimyon (TUR) |
| 11 September 2016; 09:00 | Moreno 6 Marques 3 Sousa 2 Celente 1 | Report | Mokrane 2 | Future Arena, Rio de Janeiro; Referees: Alexander Knecht (GER), Bülent Kimyon (TUR) |

| 13 September 2016; 10:15 | Germany | 4–10 | Brazil | Future Arena, Rio de Janeiro; Referees: Rudi Janssen (BEL), Raili Sipura (FIN) |
| 13 September 2016; 10:15 | Feistle 2 Horauf 2 | Report | Sousa 4 Moreno 2 Celente 2 de Melo 2 | Future Arena, Rio de Janeiro; Referees: Rudi Janssen (BEL), Raili Sipura (FIN) |

Quarterfinal

| 14 September 2016; 09:00 | Brazil | 10–3 | China | Future Arena, Rio de Janeiro; Referees: Yoshinori Nii (JPN), Rudi Janssen (BEL) |
| 14 September 2016; 09:00 | Moreno 8 Sousa 2 | Report | Shao 2 Yang 1 | Future Arena, Rio de Janeiro; Referees: Yoshinori Nii (JPN), Rudi Janssen (BEL) |

Semifinal

| 15 September 2016; 13:30 | Brazil | 1–10 | United States | Future Arena, Rio de Janeiro; Referees: Bülent Kimyon (TUR), Raili Sipura (FIN) |
| 15 September 2016; 13:30 | Marques 1 | Report | Merren 9 Hamilton 1 | Future Arena, Rio de Janeiro; Referees: Bülent Kimyon (TUR), Raili Sipura (FIN) |

Bronze medal match

| 16 September 2016; 15:00 | Brazil | 6–5 (a.e.t.) | Sweden | Future Arena, Rio de Janeiro; Referees: Bülent Kimyon (TUR), Yoshinori Nii (JPN) |
| 16 September 2016; 15:00 | Moreno 4 Sousa 2 | Report | Björkstrand 3 Seremeti 2 | Future Arena, Rio de Janeiro; Referees: Bülent Kimyon (TUR), Yoshinori Nii (JPN) |

=== Women ===
The Brazil women's national goalball team qualified for the Rio Games as hosts of the competition. They would have qualified in their own right after finishing second at the 2015 Parapan American Games. Brazil's women enter the tournament ranked 2nd in the world.

The following is the Brazil roster in the women's goalball tournament of the 2016 Summer Paralympics.

| No. | Player | Class | Date of birth (age) |
|---|---|---|---|
| 1 | Simone Rocha | B1 | 3 August 1976 (aged 40) |
| 2 | Neusimar Santos | B2 | 21 May 1981 (aged 35) |
| 3 | Ana Carolina Custodio | B2 | 23 April 1987 (aged 29) |
| 5 | Cláudia Oliveira | B1 | 29 June 1976 (aged 40) |
| 7 | Gleyse Portioli | B2 | 29 July 1983 (aged 33) |
| 9 | Victoria Amorim | B1 | 29 November 1997 (aged 18) |

Group stage

| Pos | Team | Pld | W | D | L | GF | GA | GD | Pts | Qualification |
|---|---|---|---|---|---|---|---|---|---|---|
| 1 | Brazil (H) | 4 | 3 | 0 | 1 | 25 | 7 | +18 | 9 | Quarter-finals |
| 2 | United States | 4 | 3 | 0 | 1 | 25 | 13 | +12 | 9 | Quarter-finals |
| 3 | Japan | 4 | 2 | 1 | 1 | 13 | 8 | +5 | 7 | Quarter-finals |
| 4 | Israel | 4 | 1 | 1 | 2 | 16 | 15 | +1 | 4 | Quarter-finals |
| 5 | Algeria | 4 | 0 | 0 | 4 | 1 | 37 | −36 | 0 | |

Source: Paralympic.org
(H) Hosts

| 8 September 2016; 10:15 | United States | 3–7 | Brazil | Future Arena, Rio de Janeiro; Referees: Joelle Boulet (CAN), Dawna Christy (CAN) |
| 8 September 2016; 10:15 | Miller 2 Dennis 1 | Report | Amorim 6 Custodio 1 | Future Arena, Rio de Janeiro; Referees: Joelle Boulet (CAN), Dawna Christy (CAN) |

| 9 September 2016; 18:45 | Brazil | 1–2 | Japan | Future Arena, Rio de Janeiro; Referees: Raili Sipura (FIN), Joelle Boulet (CAN) |
| 9 September 2016; 18:45 | Amorim 1 | Report | Adachi 2 | Future Arena, Rio de Janeiro; Referees: Raili Sipura (FIN), Joelle Boulet (CAN) |

| 12 September 2016; 10:15 | Brazil | 7–2 | Israel | Future Arena, Rio de Janeiro; Referees: Yoshinori Nii (JPN), Raquel Aguado (ESP) |
| 12 September 2016; 10:15 | Amorim 4 Custodio 3 | Report | Mahamid 2 | Future Arena, Rio de Janeiro; Referees: Yoshinori Nii (JPN), Raquel Aguado (ESP) |

| 13 September 2016; 11:30 | Algeria | 0–10 | Brazil | Future Arena, Rio de Janeiro; Referees: Patricia Fras (SLO), Dawna Christy (CAN) |
| 13 September 2016; 11:30 | | Report | Amorim 6 Custodio 3 Rocha 1 | Future Arena, Rio de Janeiro; Referees: Patricia Fras (SLO), Dawna Christy (CAN) |

Quarterfinal

| 14 September 2016; 10:30 | Brazil | 10–0 | Ukraine | Future Arena, Rio de Janeiro; Referees: Dawna Christy (CAN), Raili Sipura (FIN) |
| 14 September 2016; 10:30 | Amorim 7 Custodio 2 Rocha 1 | Report | | Future Arena, Rio de Janeiro; Referees: Dawna Christy (CAN), Raili Sipura (FIN) |

Semifinal

| 15 September 2016; 15:00 | Brazil | 3–4 | China | Future Arena, Rio de Janeiro; Referees: Dawna Christy (CAN), Alexander Knecht (GER) |
| 15 September 2016; 15:00 | Custodio 2 Amorim 1 | Report | Chen 3 Zhang W. 1 | Future Arena, Rio de Janeiro; Referees: Dawna Christy (CAN), Alexander Knecht (GER) |

Bronze medal match

| 16 September 2016; 13:30 | Brazil | 2–3 | United States | Future Arena, Rio de Janeiro; Referees: Dawna Christy (CAN), Raquel Aguado (ESP) |
| 16 September 2016; 13:30 | Custodio 1 Amorim 1 | Report | Armbruster 3 | Future Arena, Rio de Janeiro; Referees: Dawna Christy (CAN), Raquel Aguado (ESP) |

== Judo ==
Men

| Athlete | Event | Round of 16 | Quarterfinals | Semifinals | Repechage First round | Repechage Final | Final / BM | |
| Athlete | Event | Opposition Result | Opposition Result | Opposition Result | Opposition Result | Opposition Result | Opposition Result | Rank |
|---|---|---|---|---|---|---|---|---|
| Rayfran Mesquita Pontes | Men's -60 kg | Bolormaa (MGL); L 000–100 | did not advance | | | | | |
| Halyson Oliveira Boto | Men's -66 kg | Vieira (POR); W 100–000 | Mustafayev (AZE); L 000–010 | Did not advance | Bye | Park J (KOR); L 000–100 | Did not advance | 7 |
| Abner Nascimento de Oliveira | Men's –73 kg | Briceño (VEN); L 000–100 | did not advance | | | | | |
| Harlley Pereira | Men's –81 kg | Effron (ARG); L 000–100 | did not advance | | | | | |
| Arthur Cavalcante da Silva | Men's –90 kg | Vásquez Cortijo (ESP); W 101–000 | Nazarenko (UKR); L 000–100 | Did not advance | Bye | Ingram (GBR); L 000–100 | Did not advance | 7 |
| Antônio Tenório Silva | Men's –100 kg | Upmann (GER); W 100–000 | Skelley (GBR); W 000–000 S | Sharipov (UZB); W 001–000 | Bye | | Choi G (KOR); L 000–100 | 2nd place, silver medalist(s) |
| Willians Silva de Araújo | Men's +100 kg | Bye | Albdoor (IRQ); W 100–000 | Jimenez (CUB); W 100–000 | Bye | | Tuledibaev (UZB); L 000–100 | 2nd place, silver medalist(s) |

Women

| Athlete | Event | Quarterfinals | Semifinals | Repechage | Final / BM | |
| Athlete | Event | Opposition Result | Opposition Result | Opposition Result | Opposition Result | Rank |
|---|---|---|---|---|---|---|
| Karla Ferreira Cardoso | Women's -48 kg | Halinska (UKR); L 000–100 | Did not advance | Tasin (TUR); L 000–100 | did not advance | |
| Michele Aparecida Ferreira | Women's -52 kg | Brussig (GER); L 000–100 | Did not advance | Ishi (JPN); W 001–000 | Abdellaoui (ALG); L 000–001 | 5 |
| Lúcia da Silva Teixeira | Women's -57 kg | Wang L (CHN); W 000–000 S | Hirose (JPN); W 100–000 | Bye | Cherniak (UKR); L 000–100 | 2nd place, silver medalist(s) |
| Alana Martins Maldonado | Women's -70 kg | Greenhough (GBR); W 101–000 | Szabo (HUN); W 010–000 | Bye | Ruvalcaba Alvarez (MEX); L 000–100 | 2nd place, silver medalist(s) |
| Deanne Silva de Almeida | Women's +70 kg | Jung (USA); W 100–000 | Yuan Y (CHN); L 000–100 | Bye | Garcia (USA); L 010–100 | 5 |

== Paracanoeing ==
| Athlete | Event | Heats | | Semifinal | | Final | |
| Athlete | Event | Time | Rank | Time | Rank | Time | Rank |
|---|---|---|---|---|---|---|---|
| Luis Carlos Cardoso da Silva | Men's KL1 | 54.887 | 1 FA | Bye | | 51.631 | 4 |
| Igor Alex Tofalini | Men's KL2 | 49.745 | 5 SF | 49.870 | 5 | did not advance | |
| Caio Ribeiro de Carvalho | Men's KL3 | 43.033 | 1 FA | Bye | | 40.199 | 3rd place, bronze medalist(s) |
| Debora Raiza Ribeiro Benevides | Women's KL2 | 1:03.347 | 5 SF | 1:04.697 | 5 | did not advance | |
| Mari Christina Santilli | Women's KL3 | 57.312 | 5 SF | 57.357 | 6 | did not advance | |

Qualification Legend: FA = Qualify to medal final; SF = Qualify to semifinal

== Paratriathlon ==
Fernando Aranha, cross-country skier who competed in the 2014 Winter Paralympics, returns to make his debut in the Summer Paralympics competing in the Paratriathlon. He became the first Brazilian paralympic athlete to compete in both the Winter and Summer Paralympics.

| Athlete | Event | Swim | Trans 1 | Bike | Trans 2 | Run | Total time | Rank |
|---|---|---|---|---|---|---|---|---|
| Fernando Aranha | Men's PT1 | 13:11 | 1:21 | 37:59 | 0:58 | 13:22 | 1:06:51 | 7 |
| Ana Raquel Lins | Women's PT4 | 12:30 | 1:24 | 42:32 | 0:51 | 24:07 | 1:21:24 | 11 |

== Powerlifting ==
| Athlete | Event | Total lifted | Rank |
|---|---|---|---|
| Bruno Carra | Men's –54 kg | 162 | 4 |
| Evânio da Silva | Men's –88 kg | 210 | 2nd place, silver medalist(s) |
| Mariana D'Andrea | Women's –61 kg | ~~101~~ | NMR |
| Terezinha Santos | Women's –67 kg | 93 | 5 |
| Márcia Menezes | Women's –86 kg | 111 | 5 |

== Rowing ==
One pathway for qualifying for Rio involved having a boat have top eight finish at the 2015 FISA World Rowing Championships in a medal event. Brazil qualified for the 2016 Games under this criterion in the AS Men's Single Sculls event with a seventh-place finish in a time of 04:57.010.

| Athlete(s) | Event | Heats | | Repechage | | Final | |
| Athlete(s) | Event | Time | Rank | Time | Rank | Time | Rank |
|---|---|---|---|---|---|---|---|
| Renê Pereira | Men's single sculls | 5:05.12 | 4 R | 5:04.62 | 2 FA | 5:04.90 | 6 |
| Cláudia Santos | Women's single sculls | 5:38.62 | 2 R | 5:34.50 | 2 FA | 5:34.77 | 6 |
| Josiane Lima; Michel Pessanha | Mixed double sculls | 4:04.26 | 3 R | 4:04.52 | 3 FB | 4:03.13 | 7 |

Qualification Legend: FA=Final A (medal); FB=Final B (non-medal); R=Repechage

== Sailing ==
| Athlete | Event | Race | | | | | | | | | | | Total points | Net points | Rank |
| Athlete | Event | 1 | 2 | 3 | 4 | 5 | 6 | 7 | 8 | 9 | 10 | 11 | Total points | Net points | Rank |
|---|---|---|---|---|---|---|---|---|---|---|---|---|---|---|---|
| Antônio Nuno De Castro Santa Rosa | 2.4 mR – 1 person keelboat | 12 | 16 | ~~17~~; DNF | 17; DNS | 17; DNC | 13 | 16 | 16 | 16 | 14 | 12 | 166 | 149 | 16 |
| Bruno Landgraf; Marinalva de Almeida | SKUD 18 – 2 person keelboat | 7 | 8 | ~~10~~ | 6 | 7 | 6 | 8 | 6 | 8 | 9 | 9 | 84 | 74 | 8 |
| José Matias Goncalves de Abreu; Herivelton Ferreira Anastacio; Antônio Marcos do Carmo | Sonar – 3 person keelboat | 13 | 11 | 9 STP | 8 | ~~14~~ | 11 | 12 | 11 | 4 | 14 | 11 | 104 | 118 | 11 |

Legend: DNC=Did not come; DNF=Did not finish; DNS=Did not start; STP=Standard Penalty

== Shooting ==
The last direct qualifying event for Rio in shooting took place at the 2015 IPC Shooting World Cup in Fort Benning in November. Alexandre Galgani earned a qualifying spot for their country at this competition in the R4 Mixed 10m Air Rifle Standing SH2 event.

| Athlete | Event | Qualification | | Semifinal | | Final / BM | |
| Athlete | Event | Score | Rank | Score | Rank | Score | Rank |
|---|---|---|---|---|---|---|---|
| Debora Campos | Women's 10m air pistol SH1 | 359 | 13 | —N/a | | did not advance | |
| Debora Campos | Mixed 25m pistol SH1 | 531 | 26 | did not advance | | | |
| Alexandre Galgani | Mixed 10m air rifle standing SH2 | DSQ | | —N/a | | did not advance | |
| Alexandre Galgani | Mixed 10m air rifle prone SH2 | 628 | 24 | —N/a | | did not advance | |
| Carlos Garletti | Mixed 10m air rifle prone SH1 | 623.2 | 35 | —N/a | | did not advance | |
| Carlos Garletti | Mixed 50m rifle prone SH1 | 599.3 | 35 | —N/a | | did not advance | |
| Geraldo von Rosenthal | Men's 10m air pistol SH1 | 557 | 15 | —N/a | | did not advance | |
| Geraldo von Rosenthal | Mixed 25m pistol SH1 | 557 | 15 | did not advance | | | |
| Geraldo von Rosenthal | Mixed 50m pistol SH1 | 506 | 25 | —N/a | | did not advance | |

Qualification Legend: QG = Qualified for Gold Medal Match; QB = Qualified for Bronze Medal Match

== Sitting volleyball ==
Summary

| Team | Event | Group stage | | | | Semifinal | Final / BM / Cl. | |
| Team | Event | Opposition Score | Opposition Score | Opposition Score | Rank | Opposition Score | Opposition Score | Rank |
|---|---|---|---|---|---|---|---|---|
| Brazil men's | Men's tournament | United States; W 3–0 | Egypt; L 2–3 | Germany; W 3–1 | 2 Q | Iran; L 0–3 | Bronze medal match Egypt; L 2–3 | 4 |
| Brazil women's | Women's tournament | Canada; W 3–0 | Ukraine; W 3–0 | Netherlands; W 3–0 | 1 Q | United States; L 0–3 | Bronze medal match Ukraine; W 3–0 | 3rd place, bronze medalist(s) |

=== Men ===
Brazil men's national sitting volleyball team qualified for the 2016 Games as the host nation.

| No. | Pos. | Name | Date of birth | Sport class | Spike | Block | Club |
|---|---|---|---|---|---|---|---|
| 1 | MB | Gilberto Lourenço da Silva | September 22, 1978 (aged 37) | D | 156 cm (61 in) | 154 cm (61 in) | (Brazil) CPSP |
| 2 | MB | Levi César Gomes | January 7, 1973 (aged 43) | D | 162 cm (64 in) | 157 cm (62 in) | (Brazil) CPSP |
| 3 | S | Vagner Batista da Silva | June 14, 1975 (aged 41) | D | 148 cm (58 in) | 146 cm (57 in) | (Brazil) CPSP |
| 4 | L | Rodrigo Alves de Mello | January 6, 1986 (aged 30) | D | 147 cm (58 in) | 144 cm (57 in) | (Brazil) CPSP |
| 5 | S | Daniel Jorge da Silva | March 24, 1981 (aged 35) | D | 156 cm (61 in) | 155 cm (61 in) | (Brazil) Unilehu |
| 6 | OH | Carlos Jacó Valtrik Glemboski | September 29, 1989 (aged 26) | D | 145 cm (57 in) | 144 cm (57 in) | (Brazil) Unilehu |
| 7 | OH | Fabricio da Silva Pinto | February 28, 1994 (aged 22) | D | 152 cm (60 in) | 148 cm (58 in) | (Brazil) SESI São Paulo |
| 8 | OH | Frederico Dória de Souza (C) | May 13, 1972 (aged 44) | MD | 173 cm (68 in) | 166 cm (65 in) | (Brazil) CPSP |
| 9 | OS | Wellington Platini Silva da Anunciação | March 25, 1985 (aged 31) | D | 155 cm (61 in) | 153 cm (60 in) | (Brazil) Paineiras |
| 10 | S | Renato de Oliveira Leite | August 11, 1982 (aged 34) | D | 150 cm (59 in) | 145 cm (57 in) | (Brazil) Paineiras |
| 11 | MB | Wescley Conceição de Oliveira | November 14, 1983 (aged 32) | D | 161 cm (63 in) | 159 cm (63 in) | (Brazil) CPSP |
| 12 | OH | Anderson Ribas da Silva | February 14, 1979 (aged 37) | MD | 180 cm (71 in) | 174 cm (69 in) | (Brazil) Unilehu |

Group stage

| Pos | Team | Pld | W | L | Pts | SW | SL | SR | SPW | SPL | SPR | Qualification |
|---|---|---|---|---|---|---|---|---|---|---|---|---|
| 1 | Egypt | 3 | 3 | 0 | 6 | 9 | 4 | 2.250 | 267 | 234 | 1.141 | Semi-finals |
| 2 | Brazil (H) | 3 | 2 | 1 | 5 | 8 | 4 | 2.000 | 278 | 212 | 1.311 | Semi-finals |
| 3 | Germany | 3 | 1 | 2 | 4 | 6 | 8 | 0.750 | 280 | 288 | 0.972 | Classification 5th / 6th |
| 4 | United States | 3 | 0 | 3 | 3 | 2 | 9 | 0.222 | 167 | 258 | 0.647 | Classification 7th / 8th |

Source: Paralympic.org
(H) Host

| 9 September 2016; 10:00 | Brazil | 3–0 | United States | Riocentro - Pavilion 6, Rio de Janeiro |
| 9 September 2016; 10:00 | (25–14, 25–17, 25–14); Report | | | Riocentro - Pavilion 6, Rio de Janeiro |

| 11 September 2016; 10:00 | Brazil | 2–3 | Egypt | Riocentro - Pavilion 6, Rio de Janeiro |
| 11 September 2016; 10:00 | (18–25, 25–13, 23–25, 25–10, 13–15); Report | | | Riocentro - Pavilion 6, Rio de Janeiro |

| 13 September 2016; 20:30 | Germany | 1–3 | Brazil | Riocentro - Pavilion 6, Rio de Janeiro |
| 13 September 2016; 20:30 | (26–24, 23–25, 18–25, 12–25); Report | | | Riocentro - Pavilion 6, Rio de Janeiro |

Semifinal

| 16 September 2016; 20:30 | Brazil | 0–3 | Iran | Riocentro - Pavilion 6, Rio de Janeiro |
| 16 September 2016; 20:30 | (20–25, 19–25, 17–25); Report | | | Riocentro - Pavilion 6, Rio de Janeiro |

Bronze medal match

| 18 September 2016; 09:30 | Egypt | 3–2 | Brazil | Riocentro - Pavilion 6, Rio de Janeiro |
| 18 September 2016; 09:30 | (28–26, 29–31, 19–25, 25–22, 15–13); Report | | | Riocentro - Pavilion 6, Rio de Janeiro |

=== Women ===
Brazil women's national sitting volleyball team qualified for the 2016 Games as the host nation.

Group stage

| Pos | Team | Pld | W | L | Pts | SW | SL | SR | SPW | SPL | SPR | Qualification |
|---|---|---|---|---|---|---|---|---|---|---|---|---|
| 1 | Brazil (H) | 3 | 3 | 0 | 6 | 9 | 0 | MAX | 225 | 140 | 1.607 | Semi-finals |
| 2 | Ukraine | 3 | 2 | 1 | 5 | 6 | 5 | 1.200 | 237 | 229 | 1.035 | Semi-finals |
| 3 | Netherlands | 3 | 1 | 2 | 4 | 5 | 7 | 0.714 | 250 | 265 | 0.943 | Classification 5th / 6th |
| 4 | Canada | 3 | 0 | 3 | 3 | 1 | 9 | 0.111 | 169 | 247 | 0.684 | Classification 7th / 8th |

Source: Paralympic.org
(H) Host

| 9 September 2016; 18:30 | Brazil | 3–0 | Canada | Riocentro - Pavilion 6, Rio de Janeiro |
| 9 September 2016; 18:30 | (25–7, 25–12, 25–14); Report | | | Riocentro - Pavilion 6, Rio de Janeiro |

| 11 September 2016; 20:30 | Brazil | 3–0 | Ukraine | Riocentro - Pavilion 6, Rio de Janeiro |
| 11 September 2016; 20:30 | (25–19, 25–20, 25–14); Report | | | Riocentro - Pavilion 6, Rio de Janeiro |

| 13 September 2016; 10:00 | Netherlands | 0–3 | Brazil | Riocentro - Pavilion 6, Rio de Janeiro |
| 13 September 2016; 10:00 | (18–25, 15–25, 21–25); Report | | | Riocentro - Pavilion 6, Rio de Janeiro |

Semifinal

| 15 September 2016; 20:30 | Brazil | 0–3 | United States | Riocentro - Pavilion 6, Rio de Janeiro |
| 15 September 2016; 20:30 | (13–25, 26–28, 18–25); Report | | | Riocentro - Pavilion 6, Rio de Janeiro |

Bronze medal match

| 17 September 2016; 16:30 | Brazil | 3–0 | Ukraine | Riocentro - Pavilion 6, Rio de Janeiro |
| 17 September 2016; 16:30 | (25–12, 25–22, 25–20); Report | | | Riocentro - Pavilion 6, Rio de Janeiro |

== Swimming ==
Daniel Dias is a favorite Brazilian swimmer going into the Rio Paralympics. Brazilian swimmers competed at the 2015 IPC Swimming World Championships as part of their Rio readiness efforts.

Key

- DSQ = Disqualified
- DNS = Did not start
- DNF = Did not finish
- Q = Qualified for the next round
- WR = World record
- PR = Paralympic record
- AM = American record
- NR = National record
- N/A = Round not applicable for the event

Men

| Athlete | Events | Heats | | Heats Swim-off | | Final | |
| Athlete | Events | Time | Rank | Time | Rank | Time | Rank |
|---|---|---|---|---|---|---|---|
| André Brasil | 50 m freestyle S10 | 24.36 | 2 Q | —N/a | | 23.78 | 4 |
| André Brasil | 100 m freestyle S10 | 54.53 | 1 Q | —N/a | | 51.37 | 2nd place, silver medalist(s) |
| André Brasil | 400 m freestyle S10 | 4:13.34 | 3 Q | —N/a | | 4:11.12 | 7 |
| André Brasil | 100 m backstroke S10 | 1:01.08 | 3 Q | —N/a | | 59.55 AM | 4 |
| André Brasil | 100 m butterfly S10 | 58.27 | 1 Q | —N/a | | 56.50 | 3rd place, bronze medalist(s) |
| Ronystony Cordeiro | 50 m freestyle S4 | —N/a | | | | 43.51 | 8 |
| Ronystony Cordeiro | 50 m backstroke S4 | 49.07 | 3 Q | —N/a | | 50.84 | 7 |
| Daniel Dias | 50 m freestyle S5 | 33.55 | 1 Q | —N/a | | 32.78 | 1st place, gold medalist(s) |
| Daniel Dias | 100 m freestyle S5 | 1:15.08 | 1 Q | —N/a | | 1:10.11 | 1st place, gold medalist(s) |
| Daniel Dias | 200 m freestyle S5 | 2:39.35 | 1 Q | —N/a | | 2:27.88 | 1st place, gold medalist(s) |
| Daniel Dias | 50 m backstroke S5 | 36.46 | 1 Q | —N/a | | 35.40 | 1st place, gold medalist(s) |
| Daniel Dias | 100 m breaststroke SB4 | —N/a | | | | 1:36.13 | 2nd place, silver medalist(s) |
| Daniel Dias | 50 m butterfly S5 | 36.82 | 2 Q | —N/a | | 35.62 | 3rd place, bronze medalist(s) |
| Carlos Farrenberg | 50 m freestyle S13 | 24.41 | 1 Q | —N/a | | 24.17 | 2nd place, silver medalist(s) |
| Carlos Farrenberg | 100 m freestyle S13 | 53.63 | 2 Q | —N/a | | 53.81 | 5 |
| Vanilton Filho | 50 m freestyle S9 | 26.69 | 3 | —N/a | | did not advance | |
| Vanilton Filho | 100 m freestyle S9 | 58.51 | 3 | 58.26 | 1 Q | 57.44 | 5 |
| Vanilton Filho | 100 m butterfly S9 | 1:05.27 | 5 | —N/a | | did not advance | |
| Andrey Garbe | 100 m backstroke S9 | 1:07.21 | 4 | —N/a | | did not advance | |
| Talisson Glock | 100 m freestyle S6 | 1:12.52 | 5 | —N/a | | did not advance | |
| Talisson Glock | 400 m freestyle S6 | 5:22.52 | 2 Q | —N/a | | 5:17.24 | 5 |
| Talisson Glock | 100 m backstroke S6 | 1:17.21 | 2 Q | —N/a | | 1:15.97 | 4 |
| Talisson Glock | 50 m butterfly S6 | 33.74 | 3 Q | —N/a | | 33.14 | 8 |
| Talisson Glock | 200 m individual medley SM6 | 2:44.94 | 3 Q | —N/a | | 2:41.39 | 3rd place, bronze medalist(s) |
| Adriano de Lima | 50 m freestyle S6 | 33.92 | 5 | —N/a | | did not advance | |
| Adriano de Lima | 100 m freestyle S6 | 1:15.13 | 6 | —N/a | | did not advance | |
| Adriano de Lima | 100 m breaststroke SB5 | 1:45.04 | 4 Q | —N/a | | 1:46.18 | 8 |
| Thomaz Rocha Matera | 50 m freestyle S12 | 25.07 | 4 Q | —N/a | | 25.12 | 8 |
| Thomaz Rocha Matera | 100 m freestyle S13 | 56.10 | 5 | —N/a | | did not advance | |
| Thomaz Rocha Matera | 400 m freestyle S13 | 4:19.85 | 5 Q | —N/a | | 4:19.62 | 8 |
| Thomaz Rocha Matera | 100 m backstroke S12 | 1:04.19 | 4 Q | —N/a | | 1:04.33 | 7 |
| Thomaz Rocha Matera | 100 m butterfly S13 | 58.40 | =2 Q | —N/a | | 58.42 | 6 |
| Thomaz Rocha Matera | 200 m individual medley SM13 | 2:20.02 | 4 | —N/a | | did not advance | |
| Lucas Lamente Mozela | 100 m freestyle S9 | 1:00.46 | 6 | —N/a | | did not advance | |
| Lucas Lamente Mozela | 100 m backstroke S9 | 1:07.84 | 6 | —N/a | | did not advance | |
| Lucas Lamente Mozela | 100 m breaststroke SB9 | 1:14.54 | 6 | —N/a | | did not advance | |
| Lucas Lamente Mozela | 200 m individual medley SM9 | 2:24.71 | 5 | —N/a | | did not advance | |
| Caio Oliveira | 100 m freestyle S8 | 1:02.99 | 6 | —N/a | | did not advance | |
| Caio Oliveira | 400 m freestyle S8 | 4:40.64 | 3 Q | —N/a | | 4:33.97 | 4 |
| Ítalo Pereira | 50 m freestyle S7 | 32.68 | 6 | —N/a | | did not advance | |
| Ítalo Pereira | 100 m freestyle S7 | 1:10.97 | 7 | —N/a | | did not advance | |
| Ítalo Pereira | 400 m freestyle S7 | 5:18.10 | 6 | —N/a | | did not advance | |
| Ítalo Pereira | 100 m backstroke S7 | 1:12.56 | 1 Q | —N/a | | 1:12.48 | 3rd place, bronze medalist(s) |
| Felipe Vila Real | 200 m freestyle S14 | 2:01.11 | 3 Q | —N/a | | 2:02.33 | 8 |
| Felipe Vila Real | 100 m backstroke S14 | 1:07.62 | 6 | —N/a | | did not advance | |
| Felipe Vila Real | 100 m breaststroke SB14 | 1:16.87 | 8 | —N/a | | did not advance | |
| Felipe Vila Real | 200 m individual medley SM14 | 2:23.06 | 6 | —N/a | | did not advance | |
| Phelipe Rodrigues | 50 m freestyle S10 | 24.07 | 1 Q | —N/a | | 23.56 | 2nd place, silver medalist(s) |
| Phelipe Rodrigues | 100 m freestyle S10 | 51.96 | 2 Q | —N/a | | 51.48 | 3rd place, bronze medalist(s) |
| Roberto Rodriguez | 100 m breaststroke SB5 | 1:39.82 | 2 Q | —N/a | | 1:39.06 | 5 |
| Roberto Rodriguez | 200 m individual medley SM6 | 3:17.42 | 6 | —N/a | | did not advance | |
| Clodoaldo Silva | 50 m freestyle S5 | 36.67 | 4 Q | —N/a | | 36.27 | 7 |
| Clodoaldo Silva | 100 m freestyle S5 | 1:20.16 | 3 Q | —N/a | | 1:20.80 | 8 |
| Guilherme Batista Silva | 50 m freestyle S13 | 25.75 | 3 | 26.12 | 2 | did not advance | |
| Guilherme Batista Silva | 100 m freestyle S13 | 57.96 | 6 | —N/a | | did not advance | |
| Guilherme Batista Silva | 100 m breaststroke SB13 | 1:12.85 | 3 Q | —N/a | | 1:13.58 | 5 |
| Ruiter Silva | 50 m freestyle S9 | 26.68 | 2 Q | —N/a | | 26.62 | 7 |
| Ruiter Silva | 100 m freestyle S9 | 57.39 AM | 2 Q | —N/a | | 57.44 | 5 |
| Gabriel Cristiano Silva de Sousa | 50 m freestyle S8 | 28.24 | 5 | —N/a | | did not advance | |
| Gabriel Cristiano Silva de Sousa | 100 m butterfly S8 | 1:08.59 | 6 | —N/a | | did not advance | |
| Matheus Rheine | 50 m freestyle S11 | 27.74 | 5 | —N/a | | did not advance | |
| Matheus Rheine | 100 m freestyle S11 | 1:00.17 | 1 Q | —N/a | | 59.80 | 5 |
| Matheus Rheine | 400 m freestyle S11 | —N/a | | | | 4:41.05 | 3rd place, bronze medalist(s) |
| Ruan Felipe Lima de Souza | 100 m breaststroke SB9 | 1:13.63 | 6 | —N/a | | did not advance | |
| Daniel Dias; André Brasil; Ruiter Silva; Phelipe Rodrigues | 4 × 100 m freestyle relay 34pts | —N/a | | | | 3:48.98 AM | 2nd place, silver medalist(s) |
| Daniel Dias; André Brasil; Phelipe Rodrigues; Ruan Felipe Lima de Souza | 4 × 100 m medley relay 34pts | —N/a | | | | 4:17.51 | 3rd place, bronze medalist(s) |

Women

| Athlete | Events | Heats | | Final | |
| Athlete | Events | Time | Rank | Time | Rank |
|---|---|---|---|---|---|
| Verônica Almeida | 100 m breaststroke SB7 | 1:42.88 | 3 Q | 1:42.41 | 7 |
| Verônica Almeida | 50 m butterfly S7 | 38.95 | 4 Q | 39.51 | 8 |
| Verônica Almeida | 200 m individual medley SM7 | 3:22.27 | 4 Q | DSQ | |
| Cecília Jerônimo de Araújo | 100 m freestyle S8 | 1:09.73 | 3 | 1:09.83 | 6 |
| Cecília Jerônimo de Araújo | 400 m freestyle S8 | 5:26.27 | 5 | did not advance | |
| Cecília Jerônimo de Araújo | 100 m backstroke S8 | 1:26.63 | 4 | did not advance | |
| Maiara Regina Pereira Barreto | 100 m freestyle S3 | 2:16.80 | 4 Q | 2:11.54 | 8 |
| Maiara Regina Pereira Barreto | 50 m backstroke S3 | 1:05.94 | 3 Q | 1:01.65 | 7 |
| Beatriz Carneiro | 200 m freestyle S14 | 2:27.11 | 5 | did not advance | |
| Beatriz Carneiro | 100 m breaststroke SB14 | 1:22.31 | 3 Q | 1:21.66 | 5 |
| Camille Cruz | 50 m freestyle S9 | 31.68 | 6 | did not advance | |
| Camille Cruz | 100 m freestyle S9 | 1:06.49 | 4 | did not advance | |
| Camille Cruz | 400 m freestyle S9 | 5:09.24 | 5 | did not advance | |
| Camille Cruz | 100 m backstroke S9 | 1:20.20 | 4 | did not advance | |
| Rildene Firmino | 50 m breaststroke SB3 | 1.07.66 | 4 Q | 1:08.59 | 8 |
| Rildene Firmino | 150 m individual medley SM4 | 3:34.63 | 5 | did not advance | |
| Edênia Garcia | 50 m backstroke S4 | 54.59 | 2 Q | 55.50 | 7 |
| Mariana Ribeiro | 50 m freestyle S10 | 29.02 | 4 Q | 29.30 | 7 |
| Mariana Ribeiro | 100 m freestyle S10 | 1:02.84 | 3 Q | 1:02.75 | 6 |
| Mariana Ribeiro | 100 m backstroke S10 | 1:12.34 | 4 Q | 1:11.03 | 6 |
| Susana Ribeiro | 50 m freestyle S5 | 42.92 | 5 | did not advance | |
| Susana Ribeiro | 100 m freestyle S5 | 1:24.57 | 2 Q | 1:23.21 | 3rd place, bronze medalist(s) |
| Susana Ribeiro | 200 m freestyle S5 | 3:19.03 | 5 | did not advance | |
| Susana Ribeiro | 100 m breaststroke SB5 | 1:57.42 | 5 | did not advance | |
| Susana Ribeiro | 200 m individual medley SM5 | 3:48.59 | 3 Q | 3:50.69 | 7 |
| Patricia Pereira dos Santos | 50 m freestyle S4 | 44.10 | 2 Q | 43.92 | 6 |
| Patricia Pereira dos Santos | 50 m breaststroke SB3 | 1:07.38 | 4 Q | 1:07.42 | 5 |
| Joana Maria Silva | 50 m freestyle S5 | 37.22 AM | 1 Q | 37.13 AM | 2nd place, silver medalist(s) |
| Joana Maria Silva | 100 m freestyle S5 | 1:24.57 | 2 Q | 1:23.21 | 3rd place, bronze medalist(s) |
| Joana Maria Silva | 200 m freestyle S5 | 3:12.16 | 3 Q | 3:12.73 | 6 |
| Joana Maria Silva | 50 m butterfly S5 | 51.56 | 3 Q | 47.51 | 6 |
| Regiane Nunes Silva | 50 m freestyle S11 | 33.74 | 4 | did not advance | |
| Regiane Nunes Silva | 100 m freestyle S11 | 1:15.47 | 5 | did not advance | |
| Regiane Nunes Silva | 400 m freestyle S11 | 5:47.84 | 6 | did not advance | |
| Regiane Nunes Silva | 100 m backstroke S11 | 1:28.35 | 6 | did not advance | |
| Raquel Viel | 50 m freestyle S12 | 31.87 | 5 | did not advance | |
| Raquel Viel | 100 m backstroke S12 | —N/a | | 1:15.24 | 4 |
| Raquel Viel | 100 m breaststroke SB13 | 1:26.51 | 6 | did not advance | |
| Mariana Ribeiro; Camille Cruz; Joana Maria Silva; Verônica Almeida | 4 × 100 m freestyle relay 34pts | —N/a | | 4:56.50 | 7 |

Mixed

| Athlete | Events | Heats | | Final | |
| Athlete | Events | Time | Rank | Time | Rank |
|---|---|---|---|---|---|
| Daniel Dias; Talisson Glock; Clodoaldo Silva; Patricia Pereira dos Santos; Susana Ribeiro; Joana Maria Silva | 4 × 50 m freestyle relay 20pts | 2:33.94 | 1 Q | 2:25.45 AM | 2nd place, silver medalist(s) |

== Table tennis ==
Men

| Athlete | Event | Group stage | | | Round of 16 | Quarterfinals | Semifinals | Final / BM | |
| Athlete | Event | Opposition Result | Opposition Result | Rank | Opposition Result | Opposition Result | Opposition Result | Opposition Result | Rank |
|---|---|---|---|---|---|---|---|---|---|
| Aloisio Lima | Individual C1 | Lee C-h (KOR); L 0–3 | Davies (GBR); L 2–3 | 3 | —N/a | did not advance | | | 9 |
| Iranildo Conceição Espíndola | Individual C2 | Czuper (POL); L 0–3 | Gao Y (CHN); L 2–3 | 3 | did not advance | | | | 11 |
| Guilherme Marcião da Costa | Individual C2 | Riapos (SVK); L 0–3 | Kim K (KOR); L 0–3 | 3 | did not advance | | | | 11 |
| David Andrade de Freitas | Individual C3 | Kim J-s (KOR); L 0–3 | Copola (ARG); L 0–3 | 3 | did not advance | | | | 17 |
| Welder Knaf | Individual C3 | Sjoqvist (SWE); W 3–0 | Zhai X (CHN); L 2–3 | 2 Q | Copola (ARG); W 3–1 | Schmidberger (GER); L 0–3 | did not advance | | 5 |
| Claudiomiro Segatto | Individual C5 | Baus (GER); L 0–3 | Hunter-Spivey (GBR); W 3–2 | 2 Q | Lin Y-h (TPE); L 2–3 | did not advance | | | 9 |
| Paulo Salmin | Individual C7 | Montanus (NED); L 2–3 | Youssef (EGY); L 1–3 | 3 | —N/a | did not advance | | | 11 |
| Israel Pereira Stroh | Individual C7 | Bayley (GBR); W 3–1 | Liao K (CHN); L 1–3 | 2 Q | —N/a | Nikolenko (UKR); W 3–1 | Yan S (CHN); W 3–2 | Bayley (GBR); L 1–3 | 2nd place, silver medalist(s) |
| Luiz Felipe Guarnieri Manara | Individual C8 | Csonka (HUN); L 0–3 | Karlsson (SWE); L 2–3 | 3 | did not advance | | | | 13 |
| Diego Moreira | Individual C9 | Zhao Y (CHN); L 1–3 | Kalem (ITA); W 3–2 | 3 | did not advance | | | | 11 |
| Carlos Carbinatti | Individual C10 | Reyes (ESP); L 0–3 | Gardos (AUT); L 2–3 | 3 | did not advance | | | | 11 |
| Guilherme Marcião da Costa; Iranildo Conceição Espíndola; Aloisio Lima | Team C1–2 | —N/a | | | | Great Britain (GBR); W 2–0 | France (FRA); L 0–2 | Slovakia (SVK); W 2–1 | 3rd place, bronze medalist(s) |
| David Andrade de Freitas; Welder Knaf | Team C3 | —N/a | | | | South Korea (KOR); W 2–0 | Germany (GER); L 0–2 | Thailand (THA); L 0–2 | 4 |
| Luiz Felipe Guarnieri Manara; Paulo Salmin; Israel Pereira Stroh | Team C6–8 | —N/a | | | Spain (ESP); L 1–2 | did not advance | | | 9 |
| Carlos Carbinatti; Diego Moreira | Team C9–10 | —N/a | | | Bye | France (FRA); L 0–2 | did not advance | | 5 |

Women

| Athlete | Event | Group stage | | | | Round of 16 | Quarterfinals | Semifinals | Final / BM | |
| Athlete | Event | Opposition Result | Opposition Result | Opposition Result | Rank | Opposition Result | Opposition Result | Opposition Result | Opposition Result | Rank |
|---|---|---|---|---|---|---|---|---|---|---|
| Cátia Cristina da Silva Oliveira | Individual C1–2 | Seo S-y (KOR); L 0–3 | Podda (ITA); L 2–3 | —N/a | 3 | —N/a | did not advance | | | 9 |
| Thaís Fraga Severo | Individual C3 | Kanova (SVK); L 1–3 | Yoon J (KOR); L 0–3 | —N/a | 3 | did not advance | | | | 13 |
| Joyce Oliveira | Individual C4 | Perić-Ranković (SRB); L 0–3 | Jai-on (THA); L 2–3 | —N/a | 3 | —N/a | did not advance | | | 9 |
| Jennyfer Marques Parinos | Individual C9 | Kavas (TUR); L 0–3 | Liu M (CHN); L 0–3 | Lei L (CHN); L 0–3 | 4 | —N/a | | did not advance | | 7 |
| Danielle Rauen | Individual C9 | Xiong G (CHN); W 3–2 | Lena Kramm (GER); W 3–0 | Pek (POL); L 1–3 | 2 Q | —N/a | | Lei L (CHN); L 0–3 | Pek (POL); L 2–3 | 4 |
| Bruna Costa Alexandre | Individual C10 | McDonnell (AUS); W 3–0 | Yang Q (CHN); L 0–3 | Lučić (CRO); W 3–0 | 2 Q | —N/a | | Partyka (POL); L 2–3 | Walloe (DEN); W 3–0 | 3rd place, bronze medalist(s) |
| Joyce Oliveira; Cátia Cristina da Silva Oliveira; Thaís Fraga Severo | Team C4–5 | —N/a | | | | Bye | South Korea (KOR); L 0–2 | did not advance | | 5 |
| Bruna Costa Alexandre; Jennyfer Marques Parinos; Danielle Rauen | Team C6–10 | —N/a | | | | Bye | Germany (GER); W 2–0 | Poland (POL); L 0–2 | Australia (AUS); W 2–0 | 3rd place, bronze medalist(s) |

== Wheelchair basketball ==
Summary

| Team | Event | Group stage | | | | | | Quarterfinal | Semifinal | Final / BM / Cl. | |
| Team | Event | Opposition Score | Opposition Score | Opposition Score | Opposition Score | Opposition Score | Rank | Opposition Score | Opposition Score | Opposition Score | Rank |
|---|---|---|---|---|---|---|---|---|---|---|---|
| Brazil men's | Men's tournament | United States; L 38–75 | Algeria; W 82–43 | Great Britain; L 55–73 | Iran; W 73–50 | Germany; L 61–73 | 3 Q | Turkey; L 49–65 | Did not advance | Fifth place match Australia; W 70–69 | 5 |
| Brazil women's | Women's tournament | Argentina; W 85–19 | Germany; L 32–77 | Great Britain; L 32–63 | Canada; L 49–82 | —N/a | 4 Q | United States; L 35–66 | Did not advance | Seventh place match France; W 57–39 | 7 |

=== Men's tournament ===
The Brazil men's national wheelchair basketball team has qualified for the 2016 Rio Paralympics by virtue of being the host nation. Brazil had the choice of which group they wanted to be in. They were partnered with Spain, who would be in the group Brazil did not select. Brazil chose Group B, which included Iran, the United States, Great Britain, Germany and Algeria.

Brazil men's national basketball team – 2016 Summer Olympics roster
Players
Coaches

| Pos. | No. | Name | Age – Date of birth | Pts. | Club | Ctr. |
|---|---|---|---|---|---|---|
| G | 4 | Gomes dos Santos, Dwan | 23 – January 24, 1993 | 1.0 | ADFEGO | (Brazil) |
| F | 5 | Vieira, Pedro Henrique | 22 – November 27, 1993 | 4.0 | Magic Hands | (Brazil) |
| F | 6 | da Silva, Erick | 37 – October 5, 1978 | 3.5 | CAD | (Brazil) |
| F | 7 | Suursoo, Celestino Luciano | 38 – March 10, 1978 | 4.5 | CAD | (Brazil) |
| C | 8 | dos Santos, Paulo César | 43 – November 18, 1972 | 2.0 | CAD | (Brazil) |
| F | 9 | do Bonfim, Edjúnior José | 34 – August 30, 1982 | 4.5 | América Tigres | (Brazil) |
| C | 10 | Dauinheimer, Paulo Roberto | 32 – February 22, 1984 | 1.5 | AFADEFI | (Brazil) |
| G | 11 | Arão de Carvalho, Rodrigo | 38 – July 7, 1978 | 1.0 | Magic Hands | (Brazil) |
| G | 12 | Alves Viana, Amauri | 26 – April 13, 1990 | 1.5 | Magic Hands | (Brazil) |
| F | 13 | de Miranda, Leandro | 34 – August 27, 1982 | 4.5 | GADECAMP | (Brazil) |
| C | 14 | Sanchez, Marcos Cândido | 34 – July 20, 1982 | 3.0 | GADECAMP | (Brazil) |
| F | 14 | da Silva Júnior, Gelson | 36 – March 6, 1980 | 3.0 | Magic Hands | (Brazil) |

Head coach

- (Brazil) Tiago José Frank

Assistant coach(es)

- (Brazil) Matteo Feriani

Legend

- Club – describes last
  club before the tournament
- Age – describes age
  on 7 September 2016

Group stage

| Pos | Team | Pld | W | L | PF | PA | PD | Pts | Qualification |
|---|---|---|---|---|---|---|---|---|---|
| 1 | United States | 5 | 5 | 0 | 402 | 206 | +196 | 10 | Quarter-finals |
| 2 | Great Britain | 5 | 4 | 1 | 364 | 263 | +101 | 9 | Quarter-finals |
| 3 | Brazil (H) | 5 | 2 | 3 | 309 | 314 | −5 | 7 (Note: Head-to-head record: Brazil 3 pts, +11 PD; Germany 3 pts, +6 PD; Iran 3 pts, −17 PD) | Quarter-finals |
| 4 | Germany | 5 | 2 | 3 | 337 | 314 | +23 | 7 | Quarter-finals |
| 5 | Iran | 5 | 2 | 3 | 295 | 361 | −66 | 7 | 9th/10th place playoff |
| 6 | Algeria | 5 | 0 | 5 | 187 | 436 | −249 | 5 | 11th/12th place playoff |

Source: Paralympic.org
Rules for classification: 1) Points; 2) Head-to-head results; 3) Points difference; 4) Points scored.
(H) Hosts
Notes:

8 September 2016
15:15

Report

| Brazil | 38–75 | United States |
Scoring by quarter: 4–15, 12–24, 8–17, 14–19
| Pts: Candido Sanchez 12; Rebs: De Miranda 13; Asts: de Miranda 5 | | Pts: Turek, Bell 15; Rebs: Turek, Serio 7 Asts: Serio 7 |

Rio Olympic Arena, Rio de Janeiro
Referees: Juan Uruneula

9 September 2016
21:00

Report

| Algeria | 43–82 | Brazil |
Scoring by quarter: 16–21, 10–18, 4–23, 13–20
| Pts: Guedoun 24; Rebs: Guedoun 12; Asts: Mansouri 5 | | Pts: Candido Sanchez 24; Rebs: Candido Sanchez, De Miranda 9 Asts: Candido Sanchez 7 |

Rio Olympic Arena, Rio de Janeiro
Referees: Nurredin Bilmez

10 September 2016
21:00

Report[

| Great Britain | 73–55 | Brazil |
Scoring by quarter: 15–12, 20–15, 18–16, 20–12
| Pts: Choudhry 18; Rebs: Choudhry 10; Asts: Choudhry 9 | | Pts: Candido Sanchez 9 Rebs: De Miranda 15; Asts: De Miranda, Da Silva 3 |

Carioca Arena 1, Rio de Janeiro
Referees: Matt Wells

11 September 2016
15:15

Report

| Brazil | 73–50 | Iran |
Scoring by quarter: 13–10, 26–9, 19–13, 15–18
| Pts: Candido Sanchez 25; Rebs: De Miranda, Candido Sanchex, Da Sila 4 Asts: Candido Sanchez 12 | | Pts: Ebrahim 13; Rebs: Ebrahim 6 Asts: four players 2 |

Rio Olympic Arena, Rio de Janeiro
Referees: Akexandre Lapointe

12 September 2016
21:45

Report

| Brazil | 61–73 | Germany |
Scoring by quarter: 8–15, 19–18, 18–21, 16–19
| Pts: Da Silva 21; Rebs: De Miranda 12; Asts: Dos Santos 7 | | Pts: Bohme 26; Rebs: Bohme 13; Asts: Bohme 7 |

Rio Olympic Arena, Rio de Janeiro
Referees: Philip Haines

Quarterfinal

14 September 2016
21:00

Report

| Turkey | 65–49 | Brazil |
Scoring by quarter: 19–8, 20–12, 14–14, 12–15
| Pts: Gürbulak 17; Rebs: Gümüş 10; Asts: Gürbulak 11 | | Pts: Candido Sanchez 18; Rebs: De Miranda 9 Asts: Candido Sanchez 4 |

Rio Olympic Arena, Rio de Janeiro
Referees: Sabastien Gauthier

Fifth place match

17 September 2016
15:15

Report

| Australia | 69–70 | Brazil |
Scoring by quarter: 20–17, 19–20, 13–17, 17–16
| Pts: Knowles 15; Rebs: Norris 5 Asts: Norris 5 | | Pts: De Miranda 24; Rebs: De Miranda 15; Asts: Candido Sanchez 16 |

Rio Olympic Arena, Rio de Janeiro
Referees: Max Kindervater

=== Women's tournament ===
The Brazil women's national wheelchair basketball team has qualified for the 2016 Rio Paralympics. As hosts, Brazil got to choose which group they were put into. They were partnered with Algeria, who would be put in the group they did not choose. Brazil chose Group A, which included Canada, Germany, Great Britain and Argentina. Algeria ended up in Group B with the United States, the Netherlands, France and China.

Brazil women's national basketball team – 2016 Summer Olympics roster
Players
Coaches

| Pos. | No. | Name | Age – Date of birth | Pts. | Club | Ctr. |
|---|---|---|---|---|---|---|
| C | 4 | Silva, Ivanilde | 26 – April 24, 1990 | 3.5 | IREFES | (Brazil) |
| G | 5 | Farias, Andreia | 30 – April 23, 1986 | 1.0 | ADM | (Brazil) |
| C | 6 | Assunção, Perla | 30 – January 28, 1986 | 2.0 | Allstar Rodas | (Brazil) |
| G | 7 | Costa, Lucicléia | 36 – August 16, 1980 | 2.5 | Allstar Rodas | (Brazil) |
| G | 8 | Ramos, Rosália | 46 – January 22, 1970 | 1.5 | Riopretense | (Brazil) |
| C | 9 | Rosa, Ana Aurélia | 27 – September 10, 1988 | 3.5 | Riopretense | (Brazil) |
| C | 10 | Santana, Jéssica | 23 – December 7, 1992 | 2.5 | IREFES | (Brazil) |
| F | 11 | Vieira, Geisa | 24 – August 27, 1992 | 4.0 | GAADIN | (Brazil) |
| F | 12 | Martins, Lia | 29 – June 9, 1987 | 4.5 | GAADIN | (Brazil) |
| G | 13 | Maia, Geisiane | 34 – February 15, 1982 | 3.0 | IREFES | (Brazil) |
| F | 14 | Klokler, Paola | 25 – January 26, 1991 | 4.0 | ADDECE | (Brazil) |
| F | 14 | Almeida, Vileide | 24 – November 2, 1991 | 4.5 | Allstar Rodas | (Brazil) |

Head coach

- (Brazil) Martoni Sampaio

Assistant coach(es)

- (Brazil) Francilídio de Andrade Soares

Legend

- Club – describes last
  club before the tournament
- Age – describes age
  on 7 September 2016

Group stage

| Pos | Team | Pld | W | L | PF | PA | PD | Pts | Qualification |
|---|---|---|---|---|---|---|---|---|---|
| 1 | Germany | 4 | 3 | 1 | 248 | 156 | +92 | 7 (Note: Head-to-head record: Germany 3 pts, +9 PD; Great Britain 3 pts, −2 PD; Canada 3 pts, −7 PD) | Quarter-finals |
| 2 | Great Britain | 4 | 3 | 1 | 228 | 140 | +88 | 7 | Quarter-finals |
| 3 | Canada | 4 | 3 | 1 | 252 | 181 | +71 | 7 | Quarter-finals |
| 4 | Brazil (H) | 4 | 1 | 3 | 196 | 241 | −45 | 5 | Quarter-finals |
| 5 | Argentina | 4 | 0 | 4 | 87 | 296 | −209 | 4 | 9th/10th place playoff |

Source: Paralympic.org
Rules for classification: 1) Points; 2) Head-to-head results; 3) Points difference; 4) Points scored.
(H) Hosts
Notes:

8 September 2016
12:15

Report

| Brazil | 85–19 | Argentina |
Scoring by quarter: 22–4, 18–4, 23–5, 22–6
| Pts: Almeida 31; Rebs: Almeida 7 Asts: Santana 6 | | Pts: Pallares 7 Rebs: Pallares 7 Asts: Perez 2 |

Carioca Arena 1, Rio de Janeiro
Referees: Matt Wells

9 September 2016
15:15

Report

| Germany | 77–32 | Brazil |
Scoring by quarter: 23–2, 22–11, 18–8, 14–11
| Pts: Mohnen 21; Rebs: Mohnen, Miller 7 Asts: Mohnen, Zeyen 7 | | Pts: Almeida 7 Rebs: Almeida, Assuncao 4 Asts: Assuncao, Costa, Martins, Almeida 1 |

Rio Olympic Arena, Rio de Janeiro
Referees: Tomas Pajer

11 September 2016
21:30

Report

| Brazil | 32–63 | Great Britain |
Scoring by quarter: 8–15, 6–16, 6–22, 12–10
| Pts: Assuncao, Martins 8 Rebs: Viera, Martins 4 Asts: Assuncao 4 | | Pts: Conroy 15; Rebs: Freeman 15; Asts: Freeman 10 |

Carioca Arena 1, Rio de Janeiro
Referees: Matt Wells

12 September 2016
11:45

Report

| Canada | 82–49 | Brazil |
Scoring by quarter: 24–12, 25–10, 19–12, 14–15
| Pts: Young 22; Rebs: McLachlan 10; Asts: Ouellet 12 | | Pts: Almeida 12; Rebs: Almeida 8 Asts: Almeida 6 |

Rio Olympic Arena, Rio de Janeiro
Referees: Jae Geun Lee

Quarterfinal

13 September 2016
21:00

Report

| United States | 66–35 | Brazil |
Scoring by quarter: 21–4, 14–9, 11–10, 20–12
| Pts: Hollermann 28; Rebs: Murray, Gaeng 11; Asts: Murray 6 | | Pts: Martins 11; Rebs: Martins 9 Asts: Martins 7 |

Rio Olympic Arena, Rio de Janeiro
Referees: Max Kindervater

Seventh place match

16 September 2016
9:30

Report

| France | 39–57 | Brazil |
Scoring by quarter: 12–8, 4–16, 12–12, 11–21
| Pts: Saint Omer-Delepine 10; Rebs: Saint Omer-Delepine 11; Asts: Buso 7 | | Pts: Almeida 17; Rebs: Martins 10; Asts: Santana 8 |

Rio Olympic Arena, Rio de Janeiro
Referees: Matt Wells

== Wheelchair fencing ==
Men

| Athlete | Event | Qualification | | | Quarterfinal | Semifinal | Final / BM | |
| Athlete | Event | Opposition | Score | Rank | Opposition Score | Opposition Score | Opposition Score | Rank |
|---|---|---|---|---|---|---|---|---|
| Vanderson Luís Chaves | Individual foil B | Guissone (BRA) | W 5–4 | 4 | did not advance | | | 9 |
| Vanderson Luís Chaves | Individual foil B | Gaworski (POL) | L 2–5 | 4 | did not advance | | | 9 |
| Vanderson Luís Chaves | Individual foil B | Cima (ITA) | L 0–5 | 4 | did not advance | | | 9 |
| Vanderson Luís Chaves | Individual foil B | Hu D (CHN) | L 1–5 | 4 | did not advance | | | 9 |
| Sandro Colaço | Individual épée A | Gilliver (GBR) | L 0–5 | 6 | did not advance | | | 11 |
| Sandro Colaço | Individual épée A | Pender (POL) | L 0–5 | 6 | did not advance | | | 11 |
| Sandro Colaço | Individual épée A | Citerne (FRA) | L 4–5 | 6 | did not advance | | | 11 |
| Sandro Colaço | Individual épée A | Tian J (CHN) | L 1–5 | 6 | did not advance | | | 11 |
| Sandro Colaço | Individual épée A | Mato (HUN) | W 5–4 | 6 | did not advance | | | 11 |
| Fábio Luiz Damasceno | Individual épée A | Roble (FRA) | L 1–5 | 6 | did not advance | | | 12 |
| Fábio Luiz Damasceno | Individual épée A | Betti (ITA) | L 2–5 | 6 | did not advance | | | 12 |
| Fábio Luiz Damasceno | Individual épée A | Sun G (CHN) | L 1–5 | 6 | did not advance | | | 12 |
| Fábio Luiz Damasceno | Individual épée A | Hebert (CAN) | L 1–5 | 6 | did not advance | | | 12 |
| Fábio Luiz Damasceno | Individual épée A | Al-Madhkhoori (IRQ) | L 0–5 | 6 | did not advance | | | 12 |
| Jovane Guissone | Individual foil B | Chaves (BRA) | L 4–5 | 5 | did not advance | | | 10 |
| Jovane Guissone | Individual foil B | Cima (ITA) | L 0–5 | 5 | did not advance | | | 10 |
| Jovane Guissone | Individual foil B | Gaworski (POL) | L 0–5 | 5 | did not advance | | | 10 |
| Jovane Guissone | Individual foil B | Hu D (CHN) | L 2–5 | 5 | did not advance | | | 10 |
| Jovane Guissone | Individual épée B | Massarutt (BRA) | W 5–3 | 2 Q | Naumenko (UKR); L 12–15 | did not advance | | 6 |
| Jovane Guissone | Individual épée B | Cratere (FRA) | W 5–1 | 2 Q | Naumenko (UKR); L 12–15 | did not advance | | 6 |
| Jovane Guissone | Individual épée B | Rzasa (POL) | L 3–5 | 2 Q | Naumenko (UKR); L 12–15 | did not advance | | 6 |
| Jovane Guissone | Individual épée B | Ali (IRQ) | W 5–4 | 2 Q | Naumenko (UKR); L 12–15 | did not advance | | 6 |
| Rodrigo Massarutt | Individual épée B | Guissone (BRA) | L 3–5 | 5 | did not advance | | | 10 |
| Rodrigo Massarutt | Individual épée B | Rzasa (POL) | L 5–2 | 5 | did not advance | | | 10 |
| Rodrigo Massarutt | Individual épée B | Cratere (FRA) | L 5–2 | 5 | did not advance | | | 10 |
| Rodrigo Massarutt | Individual épée B | Ali (IRQ) | L 1–5 | 5 | did not advance | | | 10 |
| Sandro Colaço; Fábio Luiz Damasceno; Jovane Guissone | Team épée | France (FRA) | L 20–45 | 3 | —N/a | did not advance | 5th place Italy (ITA); L 38–45 | 6 |
| Sandro Colaço; Fábio Luiz Damasceno; Jovane Guissone | Team épée | Greece (GRE) | L 32–45 | 3 | —N/a | did not advance | 5th place Italy (ITA); L 38–45 | 6 |
| Sandro Colaço; Fábio Luiz Damasceno; Jovane Guissone | Team foil | China (CHN) | L 9–45 | 3 | —N/a | did not advance | 5th place Italy (ITA); L 14–45 | 6 |
| Sandro Colaço; Fábio Luiz Damasceno; Jovane Guissone | Team foil | France (FRA) | L 16–45 | 3 | —N/a | did not advance | 5th place Italy (ITA); L 14–45 | 6 |

Women

| Athlete | Event | Qualification | | | Quarterfinal | Semifinal | Final / BM | |
| Athlete | Event | Opposition | Score | Rank | Opposition Score | Opposition Score | Opposition Score | Rank |
|---|---|---|---|---|---|---|---|---|
| Mônica Santos | Individual foil A | Zhang C (CHN) | L 2–5 | 6 | did not advance | | | 12 |
| Mônica Santos | Individual foil A | Morkvych (UKR) | L 0–5 | 6 | did not advance | | | 12 |
| Mônica Santos | Individual foil A | Trigilia (ITA) | L 2–5 | 6 | did not advance | | | 12 |
| Mônica Santos | Individual foil A | Krajnyak (HUN) | L 1–5 | 6 | did not advance | | | 12 |
| Mônica Santos | Individual foil A | Yu CY (HKG) | L 0–5 | 6 | did not advance | | | 12 |
| Karina Maia; Suelen Rodolpho; Mônica Santos | Team épée | Hong Kong (HKG) | L 17–45 | 3 | —N/a | did not advance | 5th place Belarus (BLR); L 29–45 | 6 |
| Karina Maia; Suelen Rodolpho; Mônica Santos | Team épée | Poland (POL) | L 25–45 | 3 | —N/a | did not advance | 5th place Belarus (BLR); L 29–45 | 6 |
| Karina Maia; Suelen Rodolpho; Mônica Santos | Team foil | Hong Kong (HKG) | L 12–45 | 3 | —N/a | did not advance | 5th place Belarus (BLR); L 27–45 | 6 |
| Karina Maia; Suelen Rodolpho; Mônica Santos | Team foil | Italy (ITA) | L 15–45 | 3 | —N/a | did not advance | 5th place Belarus (BLR); L 27–45 | 6 |

== Wheelchair rugby ==
The Brazil national wheelchair rugby team has qualified for the 2016 Rio Paralympics by virtue of being the host nation. Brazil was scheduled to open play in Rio against Canada on September 14. Their second game was scheduled to be against Australia on September 15. Their final game of group play as against the Great Britain on September 16. Brazil entered the tournament ranked number nineteen in the world.

| # | Player | Gender | Sport class | Date of birth (age) | Club |
|---|---|---|---|---|---|
| 1 | Gilson Wirzma Júnior | Male | 0.5 | June 7, 1987 (aged 29) | (Brazil) Gladiadores Curitiba |
| 2 | Lucas Junqueira | Male | 0.5 | December 9, 1987 (aged 28) | (Brazil) ADEACAMP |
| 3 | Guilherme Camargo | Male | 1.5 | February 22, 1990 (aged 26) | (Brazil) Minas Quad |
| 4 | José Raul Guenther | Male | 1.0 | March 18, 1991 (aged 25) | (Brazil) Gigantes |
| 5 | Alexandre Taniguchi (C) | Male | 2.0 | November 28, 1985 (aged 30) | (Brazil) ADEACAMP |
| 6 | José Higino (C) | Male | 2.0 | November 25, 1985 (aged 30) | (Brazil) Brasília Quad Clube |
| 7 | Bruno Damaceno | Male | 2.5 | August 22, 1987 (aged 29) | (Brazil) ADEACAMP |
| 8 | Rafael Hoffmann | Male | 2.0 | March 29, 1984 (aged 32) | (Brazil) Gladiadores Curitiba |
| 9 | Davi Abreu | Male | 2.0 | April 17, 1989 (aged 27) | (Brazil) Minas Quad |
| 10 | Anderson Kaiss | Male | 2.0 | June 21, 1985 (aged 31) | (Brazil) Gladiadores Curitiba |
| 11 | Júlio Braz | Male | 3.0 | April 29, 1991 (aged 25) | (Brazil) Minas Quad |
| 12 | Alexandre Giuriato | Male | 3.0 | January 21, 1982 (aged 34) | (Brazil) Gigantes |

Group stage

| Pos | Team | Pld | W | D | L | GF | GA | GD | Pts | Qualification |
|---|---|---|---|---|---|---|---|---|---|---|
| 1 | Australia | 3 | 3 | 0 | 0 | 188 | 158 | +30 | 6 | Semi-finals |
| 2 | Canada | 3 | 2 | 0 | 1 | 174 | 160 | +14 | 4 | Semi-finals |
| 3 | Great Britain | 3 | 1 | 0 | 2 | 152 | 135 | +17 | 2 | Fifth place Match |
| 4 | Brazil (H) | 3 | 0 | 0 | 3 | 125 | 186 | −61 | 0 | Seventh place Match |

Source: Rio2016
(H) Hosts
14 September 2016
19:15

| Canada | 62–48 | Brazil |
|---|---|---|
| | Report |

Carioca Arena 1, Rio de Janeiro
Referee: Lukasz Szymczak, Brian Ward

15 September 2016
19:15

| Australia | 72–45 | Brazil |
|---|---|---|
| | Report |

Carioca Arena 1, Rio de Janeiro
Referee: Darren Roberts, Jean Choiniere

16 September 2016
12:45

| Brazil | 32–52 | Great Britain |
|---|---|---|
| | Report |

Carioca Arena 1, Rio de Janeiro
Referee: Alexander Schriener, Liam Costello

Seventh place match

17 September 2016
10:30

| Brazil | 54–59 | France |
|---|---|---|
| | Report |

Carioca Arena 1, Rio de Janeiro
Referee: Perre-Alexandre Briere, Brian Ward

== Wheelchair tennis ==
Singles

| Athlete (seed) | Event | Round of 64 | Round of 32 | Round of 16 | Quarterfinals | Semifinals | Final / BM | |
| Athlete (seed) | Event | Opposition Score | Opposition Score | Opposition Score | Opposition Score | Opposition Score | Opposition Score | Rank |
|---|---|---|---|---|---|---|---|---|
| Rafael Medeiros | Men's singles | Baldwin (USA); L 2–6, 6–4, 3–6 | did not advance | | | | | 33 |
| Maurício Pommê | Men's singles | Fabisiak (POL); L 1–6, 2–6 | did not advance | | | | | 33 |
| Daniel Rodrigues | Men's singles | Mendez (CHI); W 6–0, 6–4 | Kunieda (JPN); L 2–6, 1–6 | did not advance | | | | 17 |
| Carlos Santos | Men's singles | De la Puente (ESP); L 1–6, 4–6 | did not advance | | | | | 33 |
| Rejane Cândida | Women's singles | —N/a | Kamiji (JPN); L 0–6, 0–6 | did not advance | | | | 17 |
| Natália Mayara | Women's singles | —N/a | Un (TUR); W 6–1, 6–0 | Whiley (GBR); L 4–6, 1–6 | did not advance | | | 9 |
| Rodrigo Oliveira | Quad singles | —N/a | | Moroishi (JPN); L 1–6, 0–6 | did not advance | | | 9 |
| Ymanitu Silva | Quad singles | —N/a | | Burdekin (GBR); W 6–2, 2–6, 6–1 | Sithole (RSA); L 5–7, 3–6 | did not advance | | 5 |

Doubles

| Athlete (seed) | Event | Round of 32 | Round of 16 | Quarterfinals | Semifinals | Final / BM | |
| Athlete (seed) | Event | Opposition Score | Opposition Score | Opposition Score | Opposition Score | Opposition Score | Rank |
|---|---|---|---|---|---|---|---|
| Rafael Medeiros; Daniel Rodrigues | Men's doubles | Bye | Egberink / Scheffers (NED); L 2–6, 3–6 | did not advance | | | 9 |
| Maurício Pommê; Carlos Santos | Men's doubles | Im HW / Lee HG (KOR); L 2–6, 2–6 | did not advance | | | | 17 |
| Rejane Cândida; Natália Mayara | Women's doubles | —N/a | Mathewson / Verfuerth (USA); L 2–6, 4–6 | did not advance | | | 9 |
| Rodrigo Oliveira; Ymanitu Silva | Quad doubles | —N/a | | Erinlib / Weinberg (ISR); L 0–6, 0–6 | did not advance | | 5 |

== See also ==
- Brazil at the 2015 Pan American Games
- Brazil at the 2015 Parapan American Games
- Brazil at the 2016 Winter Youth Olympics
- Brazil at the 2016 Summer Olympics
