= Athletics at the 2016 Summer Paralympics – Men's 100 metres T13 =

Men's 100 metres T13 at the XV Paralympic Games
- Venue: Estádio Olímpico João Havelange
- Dates: 8–9 September
- Competitors: 12 from 10 nations

Medalists
1st place, gold medalist(s)		Jason Smyth	Ireland
2nd place, silver medalist(s)		Johannes Nambala	Namibia
3rd place, bronze medalist(s)		Chad Perris	Australia

The Men's 100m T13 event at the 2016 Summer Paralympics took place at the Estádio Olímpico João Havelange in Rio de Janeiro between 8–9 September.

The T13 category is for athletes with a moderate visual impairment. Athletes in this category have a variety of visual impairments, but can typically recognize contours from a distance of 2 to 6 metres. Athletes in this category do not typically require a guide.

Ireland's Jason Smyth won the gold medal for the third consecutive Games, after Beijing 2008 and London 2012. Johannes Nambala from Namibia finished second and Australia's Chad Perris won the bronze medal.

== Results ==
=== Heats ===
Qualification rule: First 3 in each heat (Q) and the next two fastest (q) advance to the final.

==== Heat 1 ====
Rank	Lane	Name	Nationality	Reaction	Time	Notes
1	4	Jason Smyth	Ireland	0.155	10.76	Q
2	5	Johannes Nambala	Namibia	0.152	10.81	Q, AR
3	6	Radoslav Zlatanov	Bulgaria	0.140	11.15	Q
4	3	Gustavo Henrique Araújo	Brazil	0.145	11.16	q
5	8	Philipp Handler	Switzerland	0.153	11.18	
6	7	Tyson Gunter	United States	0.161	11.68	
				Wind: –0.3 m/s		

==== Heat 2 ====
Rank	Lane	Name	Nationality	Reaction	Time	Notes
1	5	Chad Perris	Australia	0.149	10.91	Q, AR
2	7	Liu Wei	China	0.173	11.03	Q, AR
3	8	Mateusz Michalski	Poland	0.136	11.09	Q
4	6	Kesley Teodoro	Brazil	0.165	11.10	q
5	4	Markeith Price	United States	0.139	11.23	PB
6	3	Mohamad Faizal Aideal Suhaimi	Malaysia	0.135	11.30	
				Wind: –0.1 m/s		

=== Final ===
Rank	Lane	Name	Nationality	Reaction	Time	Notes
1st place, gold medalist(s)	5	Jason Smyth	Ireland	0.170	10.64	
2nd place, silver medalist(s)	4	Johannes Nambala	Namibia	0.166	10.78	
3rd place, bronze medalist(s)	7	Chad Perris	Australia	0.146	10.83	
4	3	Kesley Teodoro	Brazil	0.155	11.00	PB
5	8	Mateusz Michalski	Poland	0.130	11.01	
6	6	Liu Wei	China	0.164	11.05	
7	9	Radoslav Zlatanov	Bulgaria	0.192	11.38	
8	2	Gustavo Henrique Araújo	Brazil	0.143	11.45	
				Wind: ±0.0 m/s		
