= Athletics at the 2016 Summer Paralympics – Women's 200 metres T11 =

Women's 200 metres T11 at the XV Paralympic Games
- Venue: Estádio Olímpico João Havelange
- Dates: 13 September 2016
- Competitors: 18 from 15 nations

Medalists
1st place, gold medalist(s)		Libby Clegg	Great Britain
2nd place, silver medalist(s)		Cuiqing Liu	China
3rd place, bronze medalist(s)		Guohua Zhou	China

The T11 category is for athletes with a visual impairment. A T11 athlete may be entirely without sight, or be able to perceive light, but have no ability to see the shape of a hand at any distance. T11 athletes commonly run with guides.

The Athletics at the 2016 Summer Paralympics – Women's 200 metres T11 event at the 2016 Paralympic Games took place on 13 September 2016, at the Estádio Olímpico João Havelange.

== Heats ==
=== Heat 1 ===
11:26 12 September 2016:

Rank	Lane	Bib	Name	Nationality	Reaction	Time	Notes
1	7	169	Cuiqing Liu	China	0.148	25.17	Q
2	5	599	Lahja Ishitile	Namibia	0.188	25.61	q
3	3	936	Sol Rojas	Venezuela	0.166	25.81	q
4	1	486	Nancy Chelangat Koech	Kenya		29.88	

=== Heat 2 ===
11:34 12 September 2016:

Rank	Lane	Bib	Name	Nationality	Reaction	Time	Notes
1	3	216	Sonia Sirley Luna Rodriguez	Colombia	0.169	26.31	Q
2	7	116	Jhulia Santos	Brazil	0.185	26.59	q
	1	197	Fatimata Brigitte Diasso	Ivory Coast	0.171		DSQ
	5	628	Lovina Onyegbule	Nigeria	0.169		DSQ

=== Heat 3 ===
11:42 12 September 2016:

Rank	Lane	Bib	Name	Nationality	Reaction	Time	Notes
1	5	115	Jerusa Geber Santos	Brazil	0.184	26.60	Q
2	7	800	Kewalin Wannaruemon	Thailand	0.264	26.73	q
3	3	450	Arjola Dedaj	Italy	0.151	27.69	

=== Heat 4 ===
11:50 12 September 2016:

Rank	Lane	Bib	Name	Nationality	Reaction	Time	Notes
1	3	325	Libby Clegg	Great Britain	0.166	25.90	Q
2	7	14	Esperanca Gicasso	Angola	0.159	26.67	q
3	5	549	Diana Laura Coraza Castaneda	Mexico	0.147	27.18	

=== Heat 5 ===
11:58 12 September 2016:

Rank	Lane	Bib	Name	Nationality	Reaction	Time	Notes
1	7	105	Terezinha Guilhermina	Brazil	0.186	25.07	Q
2	5	187	Guohua Zhou	China	0.174	25.21	q
3	3	692	Joanna Mazur	Poland	0.129	26.62	q
4	1	272	Lia Beel Quintana	Spain	0.293	29.65	

== Semifinals ==
=== Semifinal 1 ===
19:43 12 September 2016:

Rank	Lane	Bib	Name	Nationality	Reaction	Time	Notes
1	5	105	Terezinha Guilhermina	Brazil	0.137	24.86	Q
2	3	187	Guohua Zhou	China	0.177	25.07	q
3	7	599	Lahja Ishitile	Namibia	0.186	25.37	
4	1	800	Kewalin Wannaruemon	Thailand	0.219	26.81	

=== Semifinal 2 ===
19:49 12 September 2016:

Rank	Lane	Bib	Name	Nationality	Reaction	Time	Notes
1	5	325	Libby Clegg	Great Britain	0.185	25.24	Q
2	3	216	Sonia Sirley Luna Rodriguez	Colombia	0.201	26.37	
3	7	116	Jhulia Santos	Brazil	0.195	26.42	
4	1	692	Joanna Mazur	Poland	0.174	26.87	

=== Semifinal 3 ===
19:55 12 September 2016:

Rank	Lane	Bib	Name	Nationality	Reaction	Time	Notes
1	5	169	Cuiqing Liu	China	0.166	25.21	Q
2	7	936	Sol Rojas	Venezuela	0.155	25.47	
3	3	115	Jerusa Geber Santos	Brazil	0.223	25.76	
4	1	14	Esperanca Gicasso	Angola	0.160	26.92	

== Final ==
19:42 13 September 2016:

Rank	Lane	Bib	Name	Nationality	Reaction	Time	Notes
1st place, gold medalist(s)	7	325	Libby Clegg	Great Britain	0.181	24.51	
2nd place, silver medalist(s)	5	169	Cuiqing Liu	China	0.148	24.85	
3rd place, bronze medalist(s)	1	187	Guohua Zhou	China	0.163	24.99	
	3	105	Terezinha Guilhermina	Brazil			DSQ
