= Athletics at the 2016 Summer Paralympics – Women's 100 metres T47 =

Women's 100 metres T47 at the XV Paralympic Games
- Venue: Rio Olympic Stadium
- Dates: 8 and 9 September

The Women's 100 metres T47 event at the 2016 Summer Paralympics took place at the Rio Olympic Stadium on 10 and 11 September. It featured 13 athletes from 10 countries.

The event incorporated athletes from classifications T45, T46 and T47.

== Heats ==
In the heats, the first three in each race, and the two fastest losers overall qualify for the final.

=== Heat 1 ===
Rank	Lane	Athlete	Country	Time	Notes
1	3	Alicja Fiodorow	Poland	12.43	Q, AR
2	7	Polly Maton	Great Britain	12.98	Q
3	5	Sheila Finder	Brazil	13.09	Q
4	6	Amy Watt	United States	13.66	
5	8	Styliani Smaragdi	Greece	13.70	
6	4	Angelina Lanza	France	DNS	

=== Heat 2 ===
Rank	Lane	Athlete	Country	Time	Notes
1	6	Deja Young	United States	12.12	Q
2	3	Yunidis Castillo	Cuba	12.13	Q, SB
3	8	Teresinha de Jesus Correia dos Santos	Brazil	12.86	Q
4	7	Anna Grimaldi	New Zealand	12.88	q, PB
5	5	Sae Tsuji	Japan	13.10	q
6	4	Katarzyna Piekart	Poland	13.36	
7	2	Aldana Ibanez	Argentina	13.99	PB

== Final ==
Rank	Lane	Athlete	Country	Time	Notes
1st place, gold medalist(s)	7	Deja Young	United States	12.15	
2nd place, silver medalist(s)	6	Alicja Fiodorow	Poland	12.46	
3rd place, bronze medalist(s)	9	Teresinha de Jesus Correia dos Santos	Brazil	12.84	
4	2	Anna Grimaldi	New Zealand	12.96	
5	4	Polly Maton	Great Britain	13.09	
6	8	Sheila Finder	Brazil	13.27	
7	3	Sae Tsuji	Japan	13.30	
8	5	Yunidis Castillo	Cuba	1:06.16	
