= Silvânia Costa de Oliveira =

Brazilian Paralympic athlete

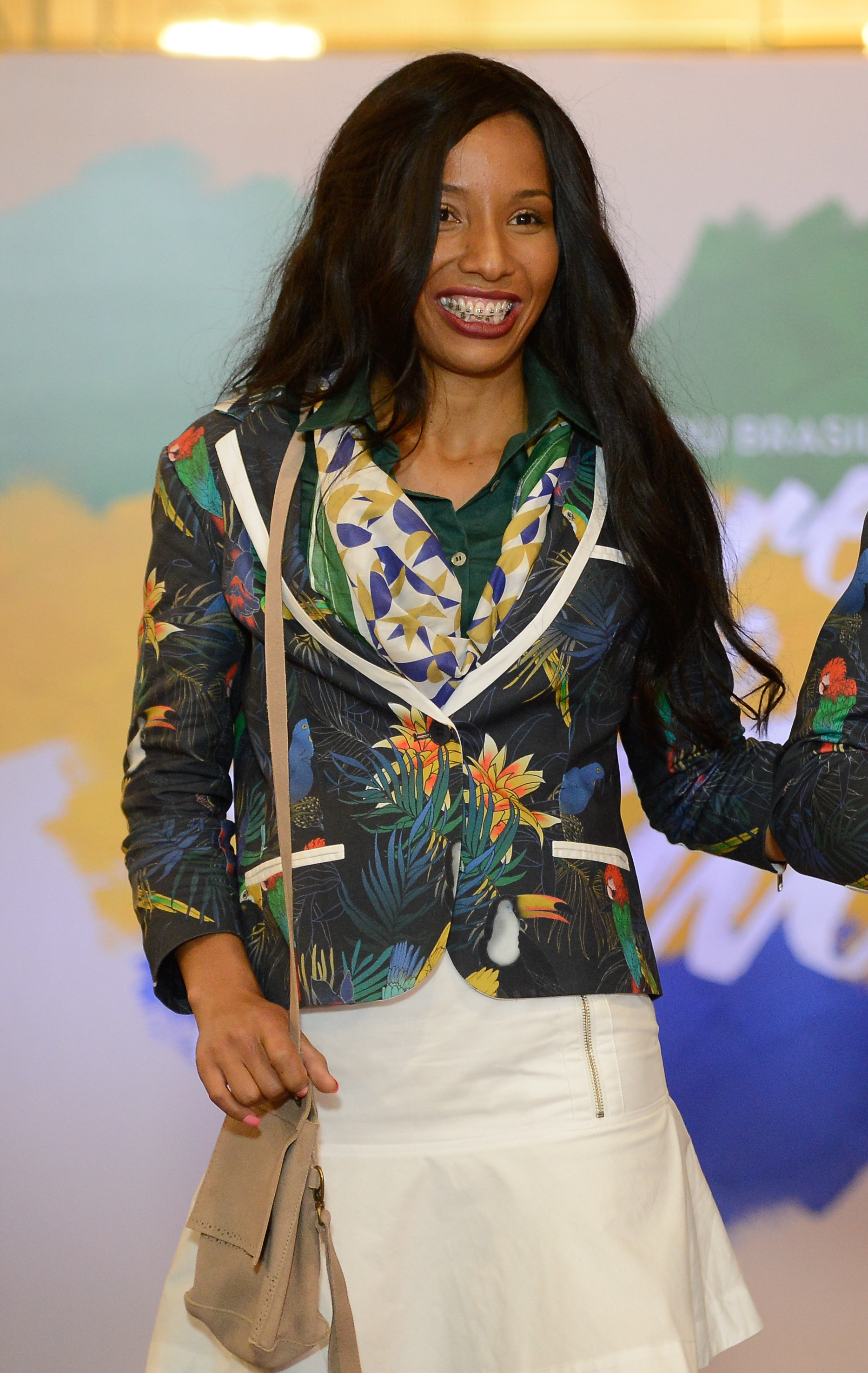
- Silvânia Costa de Oliveira in 2016

Personal information
- Born: 23 May 1987 (age 39) Três Lagoas, Brazil
- Height: 1.74 m (5 ft 9 in)

Sport
- Country: Brazil
- Sport: Para athletics
- Disability: Vision impairment
- Disability class: T11
- Event: Long jump
Medal record
Paralympic Games
Gold medal – first place	2016 Rio de Janeiro	Long jump T11
Gold medal – first place	2020 Tokyo	Long jump T11
Parapan American Games
Gold medal – first place	2015 Toronto	Long jump T11/T12

Silvânia Costa de Oliveira (born 23 May 1987) is a visually impaired Brazilian Paralympic athlete. She is a two-time gold medalist at the Summer Paralympics. She won the gold medal in the women's long jump T11 event both at the 2016 Summer Paralympics held in Rio de Janeiro, Brazil and at the 2020 Summer Paralympics held in Tokyo, Japan.

Her brother Ricardo Costa de Oliveira won a gold medal at the 2016 Summer Paralympics in the men's long jump T11 event.

== Achievements ==
Year	Competition	Venue	Position	Event	Notes
Representing Brazil
2015	Parapan American Games	Toronto, Canada	1st	Long jump	
2016	Summer Paralympics	Rio de Janeiro, Brazil	1st	Long jump	4.98
2021	Summer Paralympics	Tokyo, Japan	1st	Long jump	5.00
