= Teresinha de Jesus Correia =

Brazilian paralympic athlete

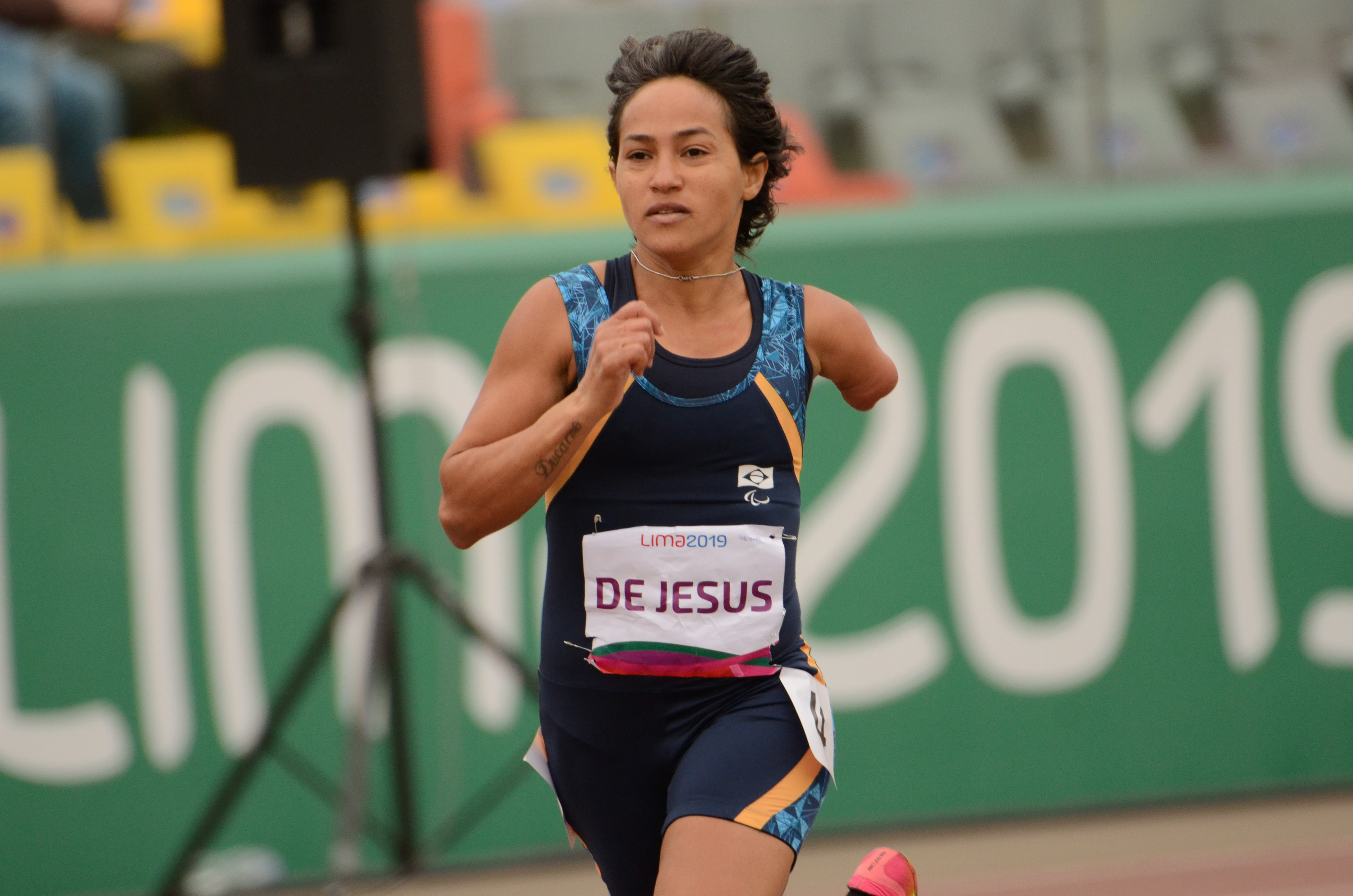
- Teresinha in 2019

Personal information
- Full name: Teresinha de Jesus Correia dos Santos
- Born: 14 October 1980 (age 46) Londrina, Brazil

Sport
- Country: Brazil
- Sport: Para-athletics
Medal record
Para-athletics
Representing Brazil
Paralympic Games
Bronze medal – third place	2016 Rio de Janeiro	100m T47
Parapan American Games
Silver medal – second place	2015 Toronto	100m T47
Silver medal – second place	2015 Toronto	200m T47

Teresinha de Jesus Correia dos Santos (born 14 October 1980) is a Brazilian paralympic athlete. She participated at the 2016 Summer Paralympics in the athletics competition, being awarded the bronze medal in the women's 100 metres event on T47 class.
