= Ricardo Costa de Oliveira =

Brazilian Paralympic athlete

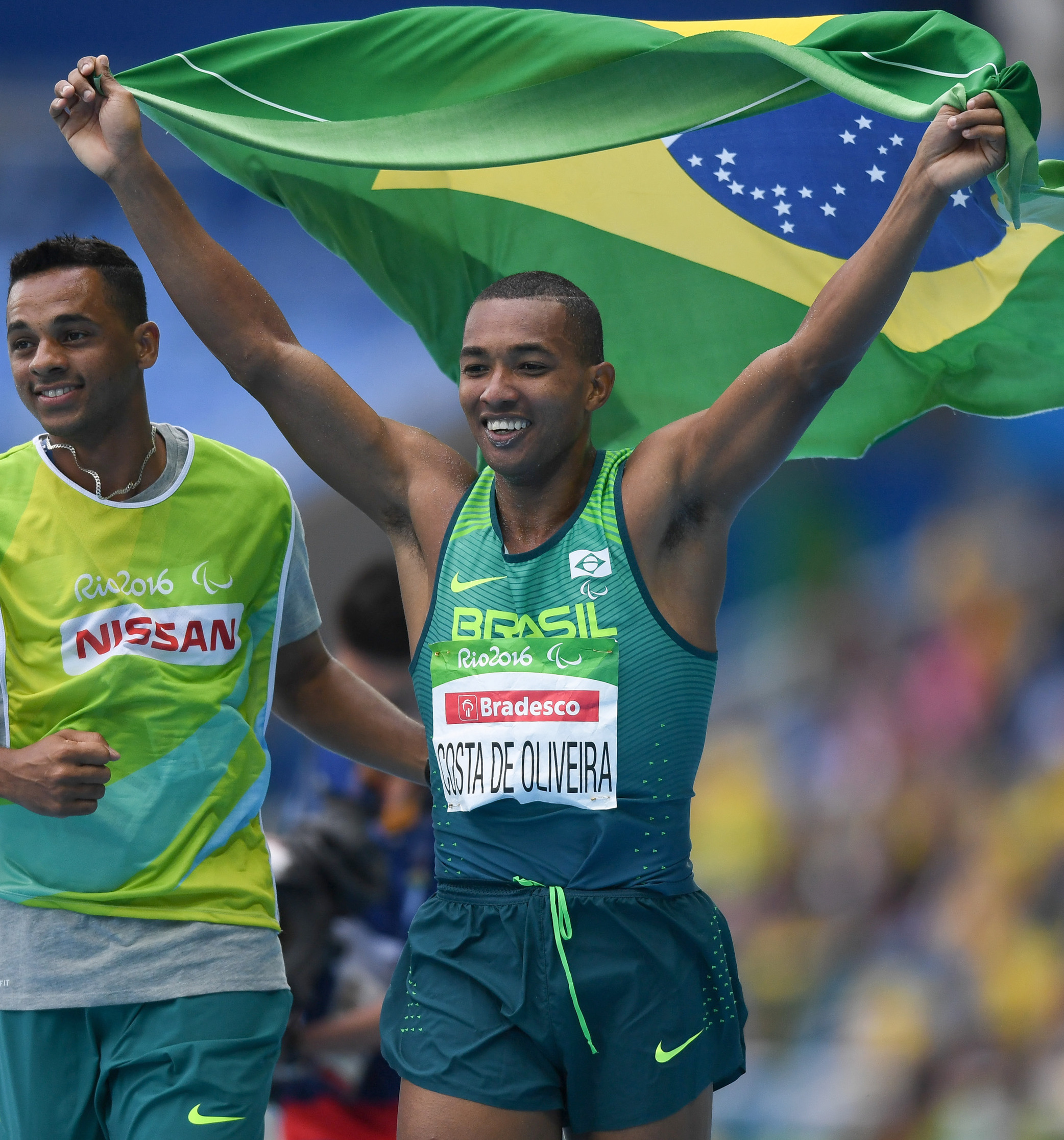
- Oliveira with coach at the 2016 Summer Olympics

Personal information
- Born: 14 June 1982 (age 44) Três Lagoas, Brazil
- Height: 1.77 m (5 ft 10 in)

Sport
- Sport: Para athletics
- Disability class: F11/T11
- Event: Long jump
Medal record
Representing Brazil
Paralympic Games
Gold medal – first place	2016 Rio de Janeiro	Long jump F11
IPC World Championships
Bronze medal – third place	2017 London	Long jump T11

Ricardo Costa de Oliveira (born 14 June 1982) is a visually impaired athlete from Brazil who competes in the long jump and 100 m sprint. He won a gold medal in the long jump (F11 class) at the 2016 Summer Paralympics. His sister Silvânia Costa de Oliveira also won the gold medal in the women's long jump T11 event at the 2016 Summer Paralympics.
