= Gizele Maria da Costa Dias =

Brazilian Paralympic sitting volleyball player

Gizele Maria da Costa Dias (born 29 October 1977 in Mogi das Cruzes, São Paulo) is a Brazilian Paralympic sitting volleyball player. She is part of the Brazil women's national sitting volleyball team. She is scheduled to compete for Brazil at the 2024 Summer Paralympics.

== Career ==
Da Costa Dias began playing volleyball at club SESI/SP in Suzano, São Paulo. She was introduced to sitting volleyball in 2009, following an injury and reconstructive surgery that resulted in no feeling or movement in her left leg.

Da Costa Dias has been a member of Brazil's women's national sitting volleyball team since 2010.

She won the bronze medal, Brazil's first in the sport, at the 2016 Summer Paralympic Games in Rio de Janeiro, after defeating the Ukrainian women's national sitting volleyball team by 3 sets to 0.

At the 2020 Summer Paralympics in Tokyo, da Costa Dias and her team again won the bronze medal in the women's sitting volleyball competition.

In 2022, she and her team won the world title for women's sitting volleyball at the 2022 World ParaVolley Sitting Volleyball World Championships. This win qualified the team for the 2024 Summer Paralympics.
