= Kesley Teodoro =

Brazilian para athlete (born 1993)

Personal information
- Full name: Kesley Josue Pereira Teodoro
- Nationality: Brazilian
- Born: 24 January 1993 (age 33)

Sport
- Sport: Para athletics
- Disability: Stargardt disease
- Disability class: T12
Medal record
Men's para-athletics
Representing Brazil
World Championships
Bronze medal – third place	2025 New Delhi	100 m T12

Kesley Josue Pereira Teodoro (born 24 January 1993) is a Brazilian para athlete who competes in T12 sprint events. He represented Brazil at the Summer Paralympic Games.

== Career ==
Teodoro has represented Brazil at the 2016, 2020, and 2024 Summer Paralympics. His best finish was fourth place in the 100 metres T13 event in 2016.

On 4 August 2025, Teodoro was selected to compete at the 2025 World Para Athletics Championships. He won a bronze medal in the 100 metres T12 event.

== Personal life ==
Teodoro has stargardt disease. His sister, Ketyla, is also a Paralympic athlete for Brazil.
