= Antônio Leme =

Brazilian boccia player

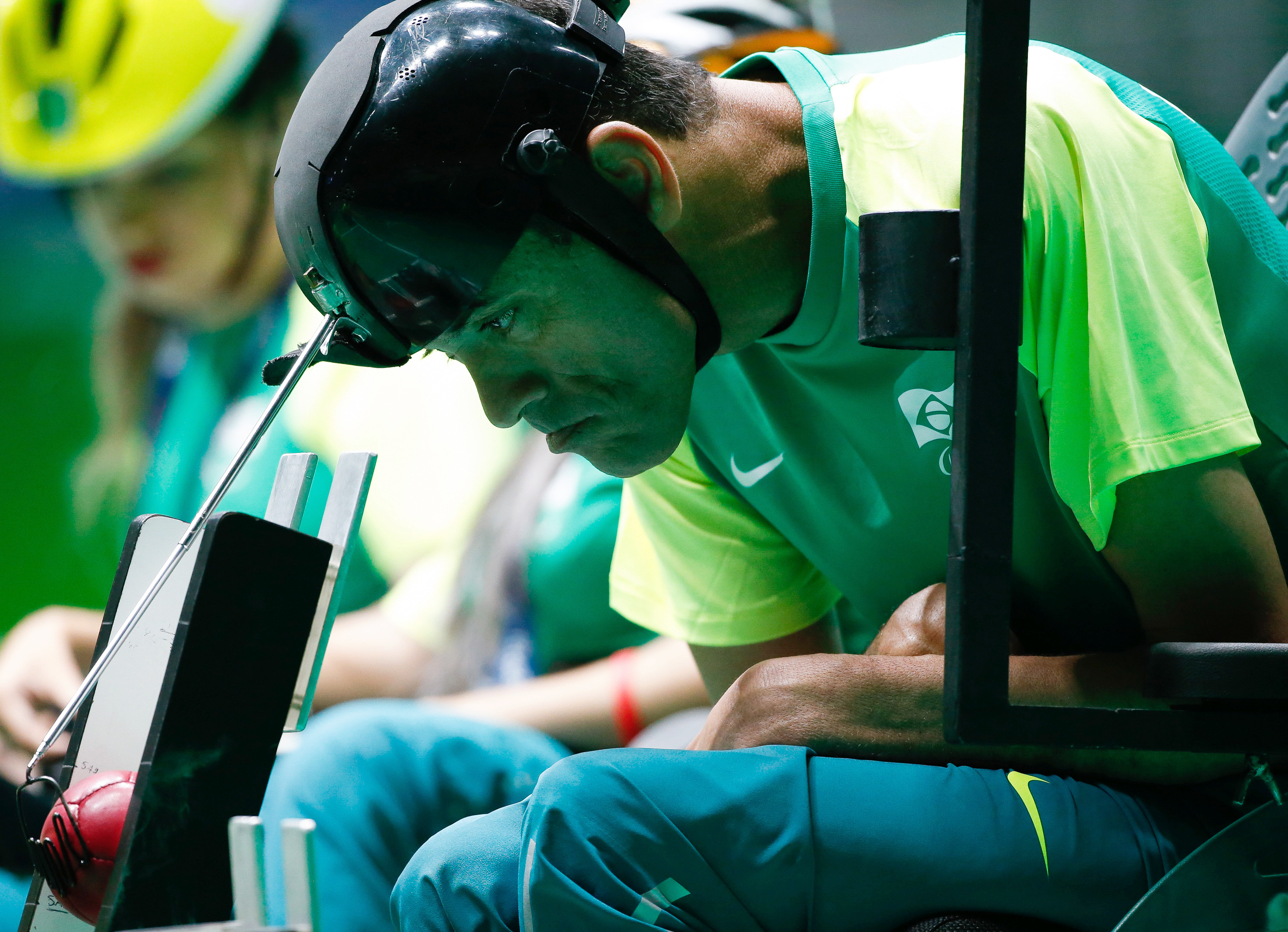
- Leme at the 2016 Summer Paralympics

Personal information
- Born: 30 June 1968 (age 57) Jacareí, Brazil

Sport
- Country: Brazil
- Sport: Boccia
- Disability class: BC3
Medal record
Boccia
Representing Brazil
Paralympic Games
Gold medal – first place	2016 Rio de Janeiro	Mixed pairs BC3
Parapan American Games
Bronze medal – third place	2015 Toronto	Pairs BC3
Gold medal – first place	2015 Toronto	Individual BC3

Antônio Leme (born 30 June 1968) is a Brazilian Paralympic boccia player.

Leme competed in the 2015 Parapan American Games in the Pairs BC3 and Individual BC3 events, winning a bronze medal in both of them. He won a gold medal at the 2016 Summer Paralympics in Rio de Janeiro, in the bocce BC3 mixed doubles, with Evelyn de Oliveira and Evani Soares da Silva. He competed in Individual BC3 but finished in last place in Pool D and did not advance.
