= Gustavo Henrique Araújo =

Brazilian Paralympic athlete

Personal information
- Born: September 14, 1992 (age 33) Uberlandia, Brazil
- Height: 175 cm (69 in)

Sport
- Country: Brazil
- Sport: Athletics
- Disability class: T13
- Club: Associacao do Desporto Adaptado de Presidente Prudente
- Coached by: Nile Legania
Medal record
Men's paralympic athletics
Representing Brazil
IPC World Championships
Silver medal – second place	2015 Doha	100 m T13

Gustavo Henrique Araújo (born 14 September 1992) is a visually impaired Brazilian track and field athlete mainly competing in T13 classification sprint events.

== Personal career ==
Araújo was born in Uberlandia, Brazil in 1992. In 2009 he was diagnosed with keratoconus, a degenerative eye condition.

== Athletics career ==
Araújo enjoyed athletics before his eyesight began to deteriorate and in 2014 took up parasport. He first represented Brazil at a major international at the 2015 Parapan American Games in Toronto. 2015 also saw Araújo enter the 2015 IPC Athletics World Championships in Doha. He entered four events in Doha reaching the finals of both the 100m and 200m sprints. He finished 8th in the 200m, but in the 100m he took second place, a silver, his first major international medal.

(Coach) Nile Legania Sr United States
