= PSAT Sports Awards =

Greek sports awards

- Country: Greece
- First award: 1954
- Website: psat.gr

The PSAT Sports Awards (Greek: Αθλητικά Βραβεία ΠΣΑΤ, romanized: Athlitiká Vraveía PSAT) are the annual sports awards that are issued by the Panhellenic Sports Press Association (PSAT). The awards are given to the year's top performing individual athletes, in the form of Athlete of the Year awards, and also to the year's top performing sports teams in the nation of Greece. The award winners are chosen by the votes of a panel of sports editors in Greece.

The first PSAT Sports Awards were given in the year 1954, by the sports writers of the "Sports Press Association" (SAT), which was later renamed to the "Panhellenic Association of Sports Writers (PSAT)". The awards ceremony, which takes place every year in front of a large audience, is also often honored by the presence of the current President of the Hellenic Republic, at the time of the event. The PSAT Sports Awards are considered to be the most important annual sports award that any Greek athlete is given by their own country.

From 1954 to 1973, the award was for individual Greek athletes, regardless of their gender. However, in 1960, the crew of the sailing vessel "Nireus", was given the award, due to their gold medal win at the 1960 Rome Summer Olympics. Since 1964, separate awards are also given to Greek sports teams. Since 1974, separate individual awards are given out to both male and female athletes of Greece. In 2004, awards categories for coaches and athletes with disabilities were added. Separate categories for male and female athletes with disabilities were added in 2008. A category for the best sports team with disabilities was added in 2013.

There are also the following awards: The Athletics Contribution and Ethics award, which is given to Greek athletes that have made a great long-term contribution to Greek sports. The Fair-Play award, which is given to Greek athletes that have displayed good character, by consistently honoring and observing the rules of fair-play in their respective sports. The Rising Talent award, which is given to young Greek athletes that are considered to be possible future stars in their respective sports. And the Social Contribution award, which is given to contributors that have helped to promote the growth of Greek sports. There are also honorary distinctions that are given to sports club personalities that have made significant contributions to Greek sports, as well.

== Best Greek Athlete (1954–1973) ==
From 1954 to 1973, The Best Greek Athlete, or Greek Athlete of the Year award was given to single individuals, regardless of their gender. However, the award was won only by males. In 1960, instead of giving the award to a single individual athlete, the crew of the sailing vessel "Nireus", was awarded as a team. That was in honor of their gold medal win at the 1960 Rome Summer Olympics.

In 1970, Christos Papanikolaou broke the world record in the men's pole vault. In honor of that achievement, he was given the award, without a vote being held to determine the year's winner of the award. In 1972, rather giving the award to a single individual athlete, three winners were chosen. In honor of their good performances at the 1972 Munich Summer Olympics.

Year	Athlete	Sport	Club
1954	Vassilis Syllis	athletics	Α.Ο. Pagrati Athens
1955	Georgios Papavasileiou	athletics	AEK Athens
1956	Georgios Roubanis	athletics	Panellinios Athens
1957	Vangelis Depastas	athletics	Panionios
1958	Christos Chiotis	athletics	G.S. Apollon Athens
1959	Antonis Kounadis	athletics	Ethnikos G.S. Athens
1960*	Nireus Sailing Vessel*; Crown Prince Constantine; Odysseus Eskitzoglou; Georgios Zaimis	sailing	Ν.Ο. Hellas; I.O. Piraeus; I.O. Piraeus
1961	Georgios Tsakanikas	athletics	Α.Ο. Palaio Faliro
1962	Vasileios Syllis (2)	athletics	Α.Ο. Pagrati Athens
1963	Nikolaos Regoukos	athletics	Panathinaikos
1964	Christos Pierrakos	athletics	Ethnikos G.S. Athens
1965	Christos Papanikolaou	athletics	Panathinaikos
1966	Christos Papanikolaou (2)	athletics	Panathinaikos
1967	Christos Papanikolaou (3)	athletics	Panathinaikos
1968	Petros Galaktopoulos	wrestling	Ethnikos G.S. Athens
1969	Stathis Chaitas	football	Panionios FC Athens
1970*	Christos Papanikolaou (4)	athletics	Panathinaikos
1971	Vassilis Papageorgopoulos	athletics	M.A.S. Aetos Thessalonikis
1972*	Ilias Hatzipavlis; Petros Galaktopoulos (2); Stavros Tziortzis	sailing wrestling athletics	Olympiacos Piraeus; Ethnikos G.S. Athens; G.S. Evagoras Famagusta
1973	Vassilis Papadimitriou	athletics	PAOK Thessaloniki

== Best Greek Male Athlete (1974–present) ==
In 1974, separate individual awards for both male and female athletes were established, with the Best Greek Male Athlete, or Greek Male Athlete of the Year award beginning in that year. In 1996, rather than giving the award to a single individual athlete, the award was given to all of the 1996 Atlanta Summer Olympics gold medalists, without a vote. In 2000, an individual award was given to Kostas Kenteris. However, at the same time, Club Association Society awards were also given to Pyrros Dimas, Akakios "Kachi" Kakiasvilis, and Michalis Mouroutsos, in honor of their gold medal performances at the 2000 Sydney Summer Olympics.

Year	Athlete	Sport	Club
1974	Stavros Tziortzis (2)	athletics	G.S. Evagoras Famagusta
1975	Christos Iakovou	weightlifting	Panathinaikos
1976	Nikos Iliadis	weightlifting	XAN Thessaloniki
1977	Nikos Iliadis (2)	weightlifting	XAN Thessaloniki
1978	Charalambos Cholidis	wrestling	Atlas Kallitheas
1979	Michalis Kousis	athletics	Gymnastiki Etaireia Agriniou
1980	Stelios Mygiakis	wrestling	Ethnikos G.S. Athens
1981	Dimitris Michas	athletics	G.A.S. Elefsina
1982	Kosmas Stratos	athletics	G.S. Larissas
1983	Charalambos Cholidis (2)	wrestling	Atlas Kallitheas
1984	Dimitris Thanopoulos	wrestling	Ethnikos G.S. Athens
1985	Charalambos Papanikolaou	swimming	Ethnikos G.S. Athens
1986	Nikos Galis	basketball	Aris Thessaloniki
1987	Nikos Galis (2)	basketball	Aris Thessaloniki
1988	Charalambos Cholidis (3)	wrestling	Atlas Kallitheas
1989	Nikos Galis (3)	basketball	Aris Thessaloniki
1990	Pavlos Saltsidis	weightlifting	PAOK Thessaloniki
1991	Kostas Koukodimos	athletics	GAS Archelaos Katerinis
1992	Pyrros Dimas	weightlifting	AONS Milon Athens
1993	Pyrros Dimas (2)	weightlifting	AONS Milon Athens
1994	Valerios Leonidis	weightlifting	VAO Thessaloniki
1995	Pyrros Dimas (3)	weightlifting	AONS Milon Athens
1996*	Ioannis Melissanidis; Nikos Kaklamanakis; Pyrros Dimas (4); Kakhi Kakhiashvili	artistic gymnastics sailing weightlifting weightlifting	Spartakos Thessaloniki; Ν.Ο. Hellas; AONS Milon Athens; AONS Milon Athens
1997	Kostas Gatsioudis	athletics	Panellinios Athens
1998	Leonidas Sampanis	weightlifting	Panathinaikos
1999	Kakhi Kakhiashvili (2)	weightlifting	AONS Milon Athens
2000*	Kostas Kenteris	athletics	Olympiacos Piraeus
2001	Kostas Kenteris (2)	athletics	Olympiacos Piraeus
2002	Kostas Kenteris (3)	athletics	Olympiacos Piraeus
2003	Periklis Iakovakis	athletics	Olympiacos Piraeus
2004	Theodoros Zagorakis	football	Bologna
2005	Aris Grigoriadis	swimming	Aris Thessaloniki
2006	Periklis Iakovakis (2)	athletics	Olympiacos Piraeus
2007	Dimitris Diamantidis	basketball	Panathinaikos
2008	Alexandros Nikolaidis	taekwondo	G.S. Megas Alexandros Thessaloniki
2009	Vlassis Maras	artistic gymnastics	G.A.S Eirini Peristeriou
2010	Lefteris Kosmidis	artistic gymnastics	A.G.O. Patron
2011	Spyros Gianniotis	swimming	Olympiacos Piraeus
2012	Spyros Gianniotis (2)	swimming	Olympiacos Piraeus
2013	Spyros Gianniotis (3)	swimming	Olympiacos Piraeus
2014	Ilias Iliadis	judo	A.S. Filippos Amyntaiou
2015	Lefteris Petrounias	artistic gymnastics	G.A.S Eirini Peristeriou
2016	Lefteris Petrounias (2)	artistic gymnastics	G.A.S Eirini Peristeriou
2017	Lefteris Petrounias (3)	artistic gymnastics	G.A.S Eirini Peristeriou
2018	Lefteris Petrounias (4)	artistic gymnastics	G.A.S Eirini Peristeriou
2019	Stefanos Tsitsipas	tennis	
2020	Giannis Antetokounmpo	basketball	Milwaukee Bucks
2021	Giannis Antetokounmpo (2)	basketball	Milwaukee Bucks
2022	Miltiadis Tentoglou	athletics	
2023	Miltiadis Tentoglou (2)	athletics	
2024	Miltiadis Tentoglou (3)	athletics	
2025	Emmanouil Karalis	Pole vault	

== Best Greek Female Athlete (1974–present) ==
In 1974, separate individual awards for both male and female athletes were established, with the Best Greek Female Athlete, or Greek Female Athlete of the Year award beginning in that year. In 1982, rather than giving the award to an individual athlete, Sofia Sakorafa and Anna Verouli were given the award, without a vote being held. That was done in order to honor their achievements in that year. In that year, Sakorafa broke the world record in the javelin throw, and Anna Verouli won the gold medal at the 1982 European Athletics Championships.

Year	Athlete	Sport	Club
1974	Maroula Lamprou	athletics	G.S. Olympia Limassol
1975	N/A	N/A	N/A
1976	Sofia Dara	swimming	Olympiacos Piraeus
1977	Sofia Dara (2)	swimming	Olympiacos Piraeus
1978	Sisi Pantazi	athletics	G.S. Volos
1979	Maroula Lamprou (2)	athletics	G.S. Olympia Limassol
1980	Angeliki Kanellopoulou	tennis	Athens Tennis Club
1981	Sofia Sakorafa	athletics	G.S. Trikalon
1982*	Sofia Sakorafa (2); Anna Verouli	athletics athletics	G.S. Trikalon; A.O. Kavala
1983	Anna Verouli (2)	athletics	A.O. Kavala
1984	Agi Kasoumi	shooting	ZAON Kifissia
1985	Angeliki Kanellopoulou (2)	tennis	Athens Tennis Club
1986	Elli Rousaki	swimming	Olympiacos Piraeus
1987	Elli Rousaki (2)	swimming	Olympiacos Piraeus
1988	Tonia Svaier	rowing	Ν.Ο. Ioannina
1989	Niki Bakogianni	athletics	Athanasios Diakos Lamias
1990	Voula Patoulidou	athletics	Iraklis Thessaloniki
1991	Christina Thalassinidou	synchronized swimming	Nireas Chalandriou
1992	Voula Patoulidou (2)	athletics	Iraklis Thessaloniki
1993	Maria Christoforidou	weightlifting	Panellinios Athens
1994	Giota Antonopoulou	weightlifting	N/A
1995	Katerina Thanou	athletics	Ethnikos G.S. Athens
1996	Niki Bakogianni (2)	athletics	ASE Doukas Athens
1997	Niki Xanthou	athletics	GAS Ygeia Rodou
1998	Olga Vasdeki	athletics	Panellinios Athens
1999	Paraskevi Tsiamita	athletics	Panellinios Athens
2000	Katerina Thanou (2)	athletics	Ethnikos G.S. Athens
2001	Katerina Thanou (3)	athletics	Ethnikos G.S. Athens
2002	Katerina Thanou (4)	athletics	Ethnikos G.S. Athens
2003	Mirela Maniani	athletics	Olympiacos Piraeus
2004	Athanasia Tsoumeleka	athletics	FS Asteras Preveza
2005	Pigi Devetzi	athletics	Olympiacos Piraeus
2006	Pigi Devetzi (2)	athletics	Olympiacos Piraeus
2007	Pigi Devetzi (3)	athletics	Olympiacos Piraeus
2008	Pigi Devetzi (4)	athletics	Olympiacos Piraeus
2009	Alexandra Tsiavou	rowing	D.N.O. Igoumenitsas
2010	Alexandra Tsiavou (2)	rowing	D.N.O. Igoumenitsas
2011	Marianna Lymperta	swimming	Olympiacos Piraeus
2012	Vaso Vougiouka	fencing	Athinaikos Omilos Oplomachias - Xifaskias
2013	Katerina Nikolaidou	rowing	N.O. Katerinis
2014	Katerina Nikolaidou (2) (2)	rowing	N.O. Katerinis
2015	Nikol Kyriakopoulou	athletics	A.G.E.S. Kameiros 2009
2016	Anna Korakaki	shooting	Skopeftikos Omilos Orion Thessalonikis
2017	Katerina Stefanidi	athletics	AO Filotheis
2018	Anna Korakaki (2)	shooting	Skopeftikos Omilos Orion Thessalonikis
2019	Katerina Stefanidi (2)	athletics	
2020	Maria Sakkari	tennis	
2021	Maria Sakkari (2)	tennis	
2022	Antigoni Drisbioti	athletics	
2023	Antigoni Drisbioti (2)	athletics	
2024	Evangelia Platanioti	Synchronized swimming	
2025	Eleftheria Plevritou	Water polo	Ferencvárosi TC

== Best Greek Sports Team (1964–present) ==
The award for the Best Greek Sports Team was established in 1964.

Year	Team	Sport
1964	Greece National Football Team	football
1965	AEK B.C.	basketball
1966	AEK B.C. (2)	basketball
1967	Greece National Football Team (2)	football
1968	AEK B.C. (3)	basketball
1969	Greece National Football Team (3)	football
1970	Greece men's national under-18 basketball team	basketball
1971	Panathinaikos	football
1972	Greece National Athletics Team	athletics
1973	PAOK	football
1974	Greece National Football Team (4)	football
1975	ΖΑΟΝ Volleyball Club Women	volleyball
1976	AEK Athens F.C.	football
1977	Ethnikos Piraeus Water Polo Club	water polo
1978	Olympiacos Piraeus Basketball Club	basketball
1979	Greece National Football Team (5)	football
1980	Greece men's national volleyball team	volleyball
1981	Greece men's national water polo team	water polo
1982	Greece men's national volleyball team (2)	volleyball
1983	Greece National Weightlifting Team	weightlifting
1984	Greece men's national water polo team (2)	water polo
1985	Greece men's national basketball team	basketball
1986	Greece men's national basketball team (2)	basketball
1987	Greece men's national basketball team (3)	basketball
1988	Greece national under-21 football team	football
1989	Greece men's national basketball team (4)	basketball
1990	Greece men's national basketball team (5)	basketball
1991	PAOK Thessaloniki Basketball Club	basketball
1992	Olympiacos Piraeus Volleyball Club	volleyball
1993	Greece National Football Team (6)	football
1994	Greece men's national basketball team (6)	basketball
1995	Greece men's national under-19 basketball team	basketball
1996	Panathinaikos	basketball
1997	Olympiacos Piraeus Basketball Club (2)	basketball
1998	Greece national under-21 football team (2)	football
1999	Gree National Women's Ensemble Team	rhythmic gymnastics
2000	Greece National Women's Ensemble Team (2)	rhythmic gymnastics
2001	Greece National Youth Water Polo Team	water polo
2002	Olympiacos Piraeus Water Polo Club	water polo
2003	Greece National Football Team (7)	football
2004	Greece National Football Team (8)	football
2005	Greece men's national basketball team (7)	basketball
2006	Greece men's national basketball team (8)	basketball
2007	Greece National Football Team (9)	football
2008	Double scull: Vassilis Polymeros, Dimitris Mougios	rowing
2009	Panathinaikos (2)	basketball
2010	NC Vouliagmeni Water Polo Club Women	water polo
2011	Greece women's national water polo team	water polo
2012	Olympiacos Piraeus Basketball Club (3)	basketball
2013	Greece National Football Team (10)	football
2014	Greece National Football Team (11)	football
2015	Greece men's national water polo team (3)	water polo
2016	470: Panagiotis Mantis, Pavlos Kagialis	sailing
2017	Greece National Water Polo Youth Team (2)	water polo
2018	Olympiacos Piraeus Water Polo Club (2)	water polo
2019	Olympiacos Piraeus Water Polo Club (3)	water polo
2020	Greece National Water Polo Youth Team (3)	water polo
2021	Greece men's national water polo team (4)	water polo
2022	Greece men's national water polo team (5)	water polo
2023	Greece men's national water polo team (6)	water polo
2024	Olympiacos F.C.	football
2025	Greece women's national water polo team (2)	Water polo

== Best Sports Coach in Greece (2004–present) ==
The award for the Best Greek Sports Coach began in 2004. The award is given to the best sports coach of any Greek team, regardless of whether they are of Greek or foreign nationality, or to the best sports coach with Greek nationality, regardless of where they coach.

Year	Coach	Team	Sport
2004	(Germany) Otto Rehhagel	Greece National Football Team	football
2005	(Greece) Panagiotis Giannakis	Greece men's national basketball team	basketball
2006	(Greece) Panagiotis Giannakis (2)	Greece men's national basketball team	basketball
2007	(Germany) Otto Rehhagel (2)	Greece National Football Team	football
2008	(Italy) Gianni Postiglione	Greece National Rowing Team	rowing
2009	(Serbia) Željko Obradović	Panathinaikos	basketball
2010	(Greece) Alexia Kammenou	NC Vouliagmeni Women	water polo
2011	(Portugal) Fernando Santos	Greece National Football Team	football
2012	(Serbia) Dušan Ivković	Olympiacos Piraeus	basketball
2013	(Portugal) Fernando Santos (2)	Greece National Football Team	football
2014	(Greece) Nikos Gemelos	Greece National Swimming Team	swimming
2015	(Greece) Dimitris Raftis	Greece National Gymnastics Team	artistic gymnastics
2016	(Greece) Tasos Korakakis	Greece National Shooting Team	shooting
2017	(Greece) Dimitris Raftis (2)	Greece National Gymnastics Team	artistic gymnastics
2018	(Greece) Dimitris Raftis (3)	Greece National Gymnastics Team	artistic gymnastics
2019	(Greece) Georgi Pomashki	Greece National Athletics Team	athletics
2020	(Greece) Alexandros Nikolopoulos	Andreas Vazaios	swimming
2021	(Greece) Thodoris Vlachos	Greece National Water Polo Team	water polo
2022	(Greece) Georgi Pomashki (2)	Miltiadis Tentoglou	athletics
2023	(Greece) Thodoris Vlachos (2)	Greece National Water Polo Team	water polo
2024	(Greece) Georgi Pomashki (3)	Miltiadis Tentoglou	athletics
2025	(Greece) Charis Pavlidis	Greece National Women's Water Polo Team	water polo

== Best Greek athlete with a disability (2004–2007) ==
From 2004 to 2007, there was a single award for both Greek male and female athletes with disabilities. In 2007, Anthi Karagianni became the only female to win the Best Greek Athlete with a disability award.

Year	Athlete	Sport	Club
2004	Charalampos Taiganidis	para swimming	F.S. Ethnikos Kozanis
2005	Christos Angourakis	para athletics	A.S. Spartakos
2006	Charalampos Taiganidis (2)	para swimming	F.S. Ethnikos Kozanis
2007*	Anthi Karagianni (female)	para athletics	Iris Kavalas

== Best Greek male athlete with a disability (2008–present) ==
The award for the best Greek male athlete with a disability, began in the year 2008.

Year	Athlete	Sport	Club
2008	Charalampos Taiganidis (3)	para swimming	Aris Thessaloniki
2009	Georgios Kapellakis	para swimming	A.S. Megalonisos
2010	Christos Tampaxis	para swimming	P.A.S.K.A. (Panhellenic Athletic Association for the Physically Handicapped)
2011	Paschalis Stathelakos	para athletics	Special Olympics of Greece
2012	Nikolaos Pananos	boccia	Special Olympics of Greece
2013	Ioannis Kostakis	para swimming	M.A.S. Aetos Thessalonikis
2014	Ioannis Kostakis (2)	para swimming	M.A.S. Aetos Thessalonikis
2015	Manolis Stefanoudakis	para athletics	A.S. Megalonisos
2016	Pavlos Mamalos	paralympic powerlifting	A.S. Aetos Athens
2017	Michail Seitis	para athletics	A.S. Aetos Athens
2018	Aristeidis Makrodimitris	para swimming	A.P.S. Proteas Palaias Fokaias
2019	Dimosthenis Michalentzakis	para swimming	
2020	Stylianos Malakopoulos	para athletics	
2021	Athanasios Ghavelas	para athletics	
2022	Dimosthenis Michalentzakis (2)	para swimming	
2023	Athanasios Ghavelas (2)	para athletics	
2024	Athanasios Ghavelas (3)	para athletics	
2025	Athanasios Ghavelas (4)	para athletics	

== Best Greek female athlete with a disability (2008–present) ==
The award for the best Greek female athlete with a disability, began in the year 2008.

Year	Athlete	Sport	Club
2008	Alexandra Dimoglou	para athletics	Iris Kavalas
2009	Semicha Rizaoglou	para swimming	Irodikos Komotini
2010	Maria Stamatoula	para athletics	A.S. Agios Christoforos Paiania
2011	Maria Stamatoula (2)	para athletics	A.S. Agios Christoforos Paiania
2012	Maria-Eleni Kordali	boccia	N.A.S. A.ME.A. Tyrtaios Iliou
2013	Paraskevi Kantza	para athletics	A.S. Stivou Tyflon (ASSTY)
2014	Stella Smaragdi	para athletics	AS Amea Elpida Thessalonikis
2015	Dimitra Korokida	para athletics	P.A.S.K.A. (Panhellenic Athletic Association for the Physically Handicapped)
2016	Dimitra Korokida (2)	para athletics	P.A.S.K.A. (Panhellenic Athletic Association for the Physically Handicapped)
2017	Maria Stamatoula (3)	para athletics	A.S. Agios Christoforos Paiania
2018	Alexandra Stamatopoulou	para swimming	N.A.S. A.ME.A. Tyrtaios Iliou
2019	Alexandra Stamatopoulou (2)	para swimming	N.A.S. A.ME.A. Tyrtaios Iliou
2020	(not awarded)		
2021	Alexandra Stamatopoulou (3)	para swimming	
2022	Alexandra Stamatopoulou (4)	para swimming	
2023	Theodora Paschalidou	para judo	
2024	Alexandra Stamatopoulou (4)	para swimming	
2025	Dimitra Krokida	para taekwondo	

== Best Greek disabled athlete's team (2013–present) ==
The award for the Best Greek disabled athlete's team began in the year 2013.

Year	Team	Sport
2013	National Wheelchair Tennis Team	wheelchair tennis
2014	National Wheelchair Tennis Team (2)	wheelchair tennis
2015	Couples BC3: Denta, Pananos, Polychronidis	boccia
2016	Couples BC3: Denta, Pananos, Polychronidis	boccia
2017	National Goalball Team	goalball
2018	National Team BC3	boccia
2019	National Deaf Basketball Team Women	deaf basketball
2020	National Para Table Tennis Team Men: Marios Hatzikyriakos, Georgios Mouhthis	para table tennis
2021	Mixed Couples BC3: Denta, Polychronidis, Pyrgioti	boccia
2022	National Deaf Basketball Team Women (2)	deaf basketball
2023	National Deaf Basketball Team Women (3)	deaf basketball
2024	National Deaf Basketball Team Men	deaf basketball
2025	National Deaf Basketball Team Men (2)	deaf basketball

== 1980 Greek Football Super Cup ==
In 1980, the Panhellenic Sports Press Association (PSAT) also established the Greek Football Super Cup. The teams that contested the original Greek Football Super Cup event were Olympiacos and Kastoria. The game was won by Olympiacos, by a score of 4–3.

Year	Winner	Score	Runner-up	Stadium
1980	Olympiacos	4–3	Kastoria	Karaiskakis Stadium, Piraeus, Attica

== Sources ==
- "The best of 25 years" (tribute to the institution), magazine "Maties sta Spor", January 1988. (in Greek)
