= Olympiakos =

Olympiakos or Olympiacos may refer to:

- Olympiacos CFP, a multisport club in Piraeus, Greece
  - Olympiacos F.C., the football department of Olympiacos SFP
  - Olympiacos B.C., the basketball department of Olympiacos SFP
  - Olympiacos SFP (men's volleyball), the men's volleyball department of Olympiacos SFP
  - Olympiacos SFP (men's water polo), the men's water polo department of Olympiacos SFP
  - Olympiacos women's basketball, the women's basketball department of Olympiacos SFP
  - Olympiacos Women's Water Polo Team, the women's water polo department of Olympiacos SFP
  - Olympiacos SFP (women's volleyball), the women's volleyball department of Olympiacos SFP
  - Olympiacos (table tennis club), the table tennis department of Olympiacos SFP
  - Olympiacos (athletics), the track and field department of Olympiacos SFP
  - Olympiacos (swimming club), the swimming department of Olympiacos SFP
  - Olympiacos (sailing club), the sailing department of Olympiacos SFP
  - Olympiacos (Fencing), the fencing department of Olympiacos SFP
  - Olympiacos (Wrestling), the wrestling department of Olympiacos SFP
- Olympiakos Chersonissos F.C., a football club in Chersonisos, Greece
- Olympiakos Nea Liosia F.C., a football club in Ilion, Greece
- Olympiakos Lavrio F.C., a football club in Laurium, Greece
- Olympiakos Patras F.C., a football club in Patras, Greece
- Olympiacos Volos F.C., a football club in Volos, Greece
- Olympiakos Nicosia, a football club in Nicosia, Cyprus

== See also ==
- Olympikus, a Brazilian sports manufacturer
