= King Constantine of Greece =

King Constantine of Greece may refer to:

- Constantine I of Greece (r. 1913–1917 and 1920–1922)
- Constantine II of Greece (r. 1964–1973)
