= Odysseus Eskitzoglou =

Greek sailor

Medal record

Men's sailing

Representing Greece

Olympic Games
Gold medal – first place	1960 Rome	Dragon

Odysseas (Odysseus) Eskitzoglou (Greek: Οδυσσέας Εσκιτζόγλου, Odysseas Eskitzoglou; 3 May 1932 – 26 August 2018) was a Greek sailor and Olympic athlete. He competed at the 1960 Summer Olympics in Rome and won a gold medal in the Dragon class with Crown Prince Konstantinos as the helmsman and Georgios Zaimis as the other crew on the boat Nireus. Along with his fellow crew members of Nireus, he was named one of the 1960 Greek Athletes of the Year.

At the 1964 Summer Olympics in Tokyo, Odysseas was the helmsman when he and his crew of Georgios Zaimis and Thimistokles Magoulas took 8th place for Greece in the Dragon class, with the boat Proteus II.
