= Nikos Iliadis =

Greek weightlifter (born 1951)

Personal information
- Nationality: Greek
- Born: 27 February 1951 (age 74)

Sport
- Sport: Weightlifting

Nikos Iliadis (born 27 February 1951) is a Greek weightlifter. He competed at the 1972, 1976, 1980 and the 1984 Summer Olympics. He was named the 1976 and 1977 Greek Male Athlete of the Year.
