= Georgios Zaimis =

Greek sailor (1937–2020)

Medal record

Men's sailing

Representing Greece

Olympic Games
Gold medal – first place	1960 Rome	Dragon

Georgios Zaimis (Greek: Γεώργιος Ζαΐμης, 28 June 1937 in Piraeus – 1 May 2020) was a Greek sailor and Olympic Champion. He participated in three Summer Olympics. Along with his fellow crew members of their 1960 Olympic gold winning team on the boat Nireus, he was named one of the 1960 Greek Athletes of the Year.

== Career ==
He competed at the 1960 Summer Olympics in Rome and won a gold medal in the Dragon class with Crown Prince Constantine of Greece as the helmsman and Odysseus Eskitzoglou as the other crew on the boat Nireus.

He finished 8th at the 1964 Summer Olympics in Tokyo and 15th at the 1968 Summer Olympics.
