= Olympiacos Fencing =

Greek fencing club

Olympiacos CFP
- Nicknames: Thrylos (The Legend); Erythrolefkoi (The Red-Whites)
- Founded: 1926 (2014 reorganized)
- Based in: Piraeus, Greece
- Colours: Red, White
- Website: olympiacossfp.gr

Olympiacos Fencing department was initially founded in 1926 and then reorganized in 2014. Amongst the most important athletes in the history of the department were Giorgos Tsouroutas and Vaso Vougiouka. In 2023 the Club occupied its best position in women in Europe, finishing 7th.

== Honours ==
=== Greek Competitions ===
- 3 Greek Swords Championship (Women)
  - 2023, 2024 ,2025

=== European Competitions ===
- European Cup of Club Champions
  - 7th place: 2023
