= Deaf basketball =

Game

Deaf basketball is basketball played by deaf people. Sign language is used to communicate whistle blows and communication between players.

== National associations ==
The game played by deaf people is organized with national and international associations including Deaf Basketball Australia, Deaf Basketball UK and United States of America Deaf Basketball.

== Players ==
Deaf basketball has gained great visibility because of athletes like Lance Allred who played basketball with the National Basketball Association's (NBA) Cleveland Cavaliers. Allred is hard of hearing, with a 75-80% hearing loss wearing a hearing aid. He later continued to play basketball professionally in the European basketball leagues.

Another high-profile deaf basketball player is the Slovenian professional basketball player Miha Zupan, born with an impairment similar to that of Allred, yet plays power forward at the highest professional level in Europe.

== Deaf International Basketball Federation ==
The Deaf International Basketball Federation (DIBF) is a world governing body for international deaf basketball with the support of International Basketball Federation (FIBA) and in cooperation with Deaflympics and its confederations. In February 2003, it was recognized at the Congress of Comité International des Sports de Surds (i.e. the International Committee of the Deaf Sports during the Winter Deaflympics in Sundsvall, Sweden as an independent association composed of the National Organisations governing deaf basketball. DIBF encourages the growth and development of deaf basketball in all nationals of the world through an organized program of education and instruction. The Federation schedules and conducts all international contests and championships in deaf basketball in cooperation with the Deaflympics (The Deaf Olympics) and its confederations. DIBF also maintains a documented basketball history by recording and reporting on all major international contests from the inception of international competitions to the present.
