= 1967 Greek legislative election =

Parliamentary elections were scheduled to be held in Greece on 28 May 1967. However, with Georgios Papandreou's Center Union expected to win (after having been dismissed by the king two years earlier, starting the Iouliana of 1965), a group of right-wing colonels instead launched a coup d'état on 21 April, preventing the elections from occurring and inaugurating the rule of the Greek junta dictatorship.
