= Constantine II of Greece =

King of Greece from 1964 to 1973

Constantine II
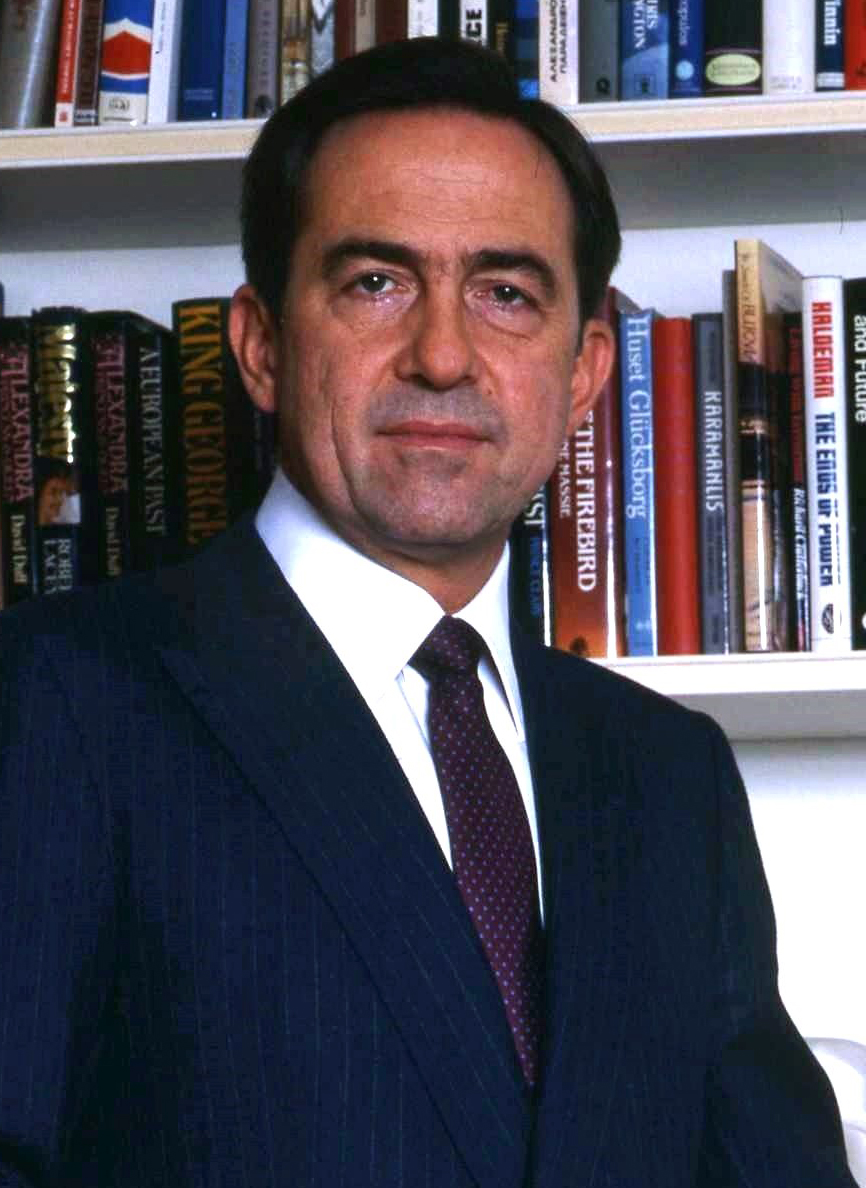
- Portrait by Allan Warren, 1987

King of the Hellenes
- Reign: 6 March 1964 – 1 June 1973
- Inauguration: 23 March 1964
- Predecessor: Paul
- Successor: Monarchy abolished; Georgios Papadopoulos as President of Greece
- Regents: Georgios Zoitakis (1967–1972); Georgios Papadopoulos (from 1972)

Regent of Greece
- Tenure: 20 February – 6 March 1964
- Monarch: Paul

Head of the Royal House of Greece
- Tenure: 6 March 1964 – 10 January 2023
- Successor: Pavlos
- Born: 2 June 1940; Psychiko Palace, Psychiko, Kingdom of Greece
- Died: 10 January 2023 (aged 82); Ygeia Hospital, Marousi, Greece
- Burial: 16 January 2023; Royal Cemetery, Tatoi Palace, Greece
- Spouse: Anne-Marie of Denmark (m. 1964)
- Issue: Princess Alexia; Pavlos, Crown Prince of Greece; Prince Nikolaos; Princess Theodora; Prince Philippos
- Greek: Κωνσταντίνος Βʹ (Konstantínos II)
- House: Glücksburg
- Father: Paul of Greece
- Mother: Frederica of Hanover
- Religion: Greek Orthodox
- Military career
- Allegiance: Kingdom of Greece
- Branch: Royal Hellenic Army; Royal Hellenic Navy; Royal Hellenic Air Force
- Rank: Field Marshal; Admiral of the Fleet; Marshal of the Air Force
- Sports career
Medal record
Men's sailing
Representing Greece
Olympic Games
Gold medal – first place	1960 Rome	Dragon

Constantine II (Greek: Κωνσταντίνος Βʹ, romanised: Konstantínos II, pronounced [ˌkonsta(n)ˈdinos o ˈðefteros]; 2 June 1940 – 10 January 2023) was the last King of Greece, reigning from 6 March 1964 until the abolition of the Greek monarchy on 1 June 1973.

Constantine was born in Athens as the only son of Crown Prince Paul and Crown Princess Frederica of Greece. Being of Danish descent, he was also born as a prince of Denmark. As his family was forced into exile during the Second World War, he spent the first years of his childhood in Egypt and South Africa. He returned to Greece with his family in 1946 during the Greek Civil War. After Constantine's uncle, George II, died in 1947, Paul became the new king and Constantine the crown prince. As a young man, Constantine was a competitive sailor and Olympian, winning a gold medal in the 1960 Rome Olympics in the Dragon class along with Odysseus Eskitzoglou and George Zaimis in the yacht Nireus. From 1964, he served on the International Olympic Committee.

Constantine acceded as king following his father's death in 1964. Later that year, he married Princess Anne-Marie of Denmark, with whom he had five children. Although the accession of the young monarch was initially regarded auspiciously, his reign saw political instability that culminated in the Colonels' Coup of 21 April 1967. The coup left Constantine, as head of state, with little room to manoeuvre since he had no loyal military forces on which to rely. He thus reluctantly agreed to inaugurate the junta, on the condition that it be made up largely of civilian ministers. On 13 December 1967, Constantine was forced to flee the country, following an unsuccessful countercoup against the junta.

Constantine formally remained Greece's head of state in exile until the junta abolished the monarchy in June 1973, a decision ratified via a referendum in July, which was contested by Constantine. After the restoration of democracy a year later, another referendum was called for December 1974, but Constantine was not allowed to return to Greece to campaign. The referendum confirmed by a majority of almost 70% the abolition of the monarchy and the establishment of the Third Hellenic Republic. Constantine publicly accepted the verdict of the 1974 vote. From 1975 until 1978, he was involved in conspiracies to overthrow the government via a coup, which eventually did not materialise. After living for several decades in London, Constantine moved back to Athens in 2013. He died there in 2023 following a stroke.

== Early life ==
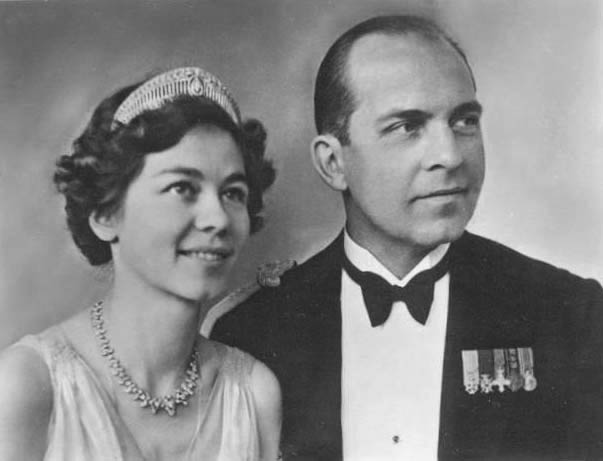
Constantine's parents, Frederica and Paul, in 1939

Constantine was born in the afternoon of 2 June 1940 at his parents' residence, Villa Psychiko at Leoforos Diamantidou 14 in Psychiko, an affluent suburb of Athens. He was the second child and only son of Crown Prince Paul and Crown Princess Frederica. His father was the younger brother and heir presumptive of the reigning Greek king, George II, and his mother was the only daughter of Ernest Augustus, Duke of Brunswick, and Princess Victoria Louise of Prussia.

Prince Constantine had an elder sister, Princess Sofia, born in 1938. However, since agnatic primogeniture governed the succession to throne in Greece at the time, the birth of a male heir to the throne had been anxiously awaited by the Greek royal family, and the newborn prince was therefore received with joy by his parents. His birth was celebrated with a 101–gun salute from Mount Lycabettus in Athens, which, according to tradition, announced that the newborn was a boy. According to Greek naming practices, being the first son, he was named after his paternal grandfather, Constantine I, who had died in 1923. At his baptism on 20 July 1940 at the Royal Palace of Athens, the Hellenic Armed Forces acted as his godparent.

=== World War II and the exile of the royal family ===
Constantine was born during the early stages of World War II. He was just a few months old when, on 28 October 1940, Fascist Italy invaded Greece from Albania, beginning the Greco-Italian War. The Greek Army was able to halt the invasion temporarily and push the Italians back into Albania. However, the Greek successes forced Nazi Germany to intervene and the Germans invaded Greece and Yugoslavia on 6 April 1941 and overran both countries within a month, despite British aid to Greece in the form of an expeditionary corps. On 22 April 1941, Princess Frederica and her two children, Sofia and Constantine, were evacuated to Crete in a British Short Sunderland flying boat along with most of the Greek royal family. The next day, they were followed by King George II and Prince Paul. However the imminent German invasion of Crete quickly made the situation untenable and Constantine and his family were evacuated from Crete to Egypt on 30 April 1941, a fortnight before the German attack on the island. In Alexandria, the exiled Greek royals were welcomed by the Greek diaspora, which provided them with lodging, money and clothing. The presence of the Greek royal family and government began to worry King Farouk of Egypt and his pro-Italian ministers. Constantine and his family, therefore, had to seek another refuge where they could get through the war and continue their fight against the Axis powers. George VI of the United Kingdom opposed the presence of Princess Frederica, who was suspected of having Nazi sympathies, and her children in Britain, but it was decided that Constantine's father and uncle could take up residence in London, where a government-in-exile was set up, while the rest of the family could seek refuge in the then-Union of South Africa.

On 27 June 1941, most of the Greek royal family, therefore, set off for South Africa on board the Dutch steamship Nieuw Amsterdam, which arrived in Durban on 8 July 1941. After a two-month stay in Durban, Prince Paul left for England with his brother, and Constantine then barely saw his father again for the next three years. The rest of the family settled in Cape Town, where the family was joined by a younger sister, Princess Irene, born in 1942. Prince Constantine, Princess Sofia, their mother and their aunt Princess Katherine were initially lodged with South African Governor-General Patrick Duncan at his official residence Westbrooke in Cape Town.

The group subsequently moved several times until they settled in Villa Irene in Pretoria with Prime Minister Jan Smuts, who quickly became a close friend of the exiled Greeks. From early 1944, the family again took up residence in Egypt. In January 1944, Frederica was reunited with Paul in Cairo, and their children joined them in March of that year. Despite their difficult financial circumstances, the family then established friendly relations with several Egyptian personalities, including Queen Farida, whose daughters were roughly the same age as Constantine and his sisters.

=== After World War II and return to Greece ===
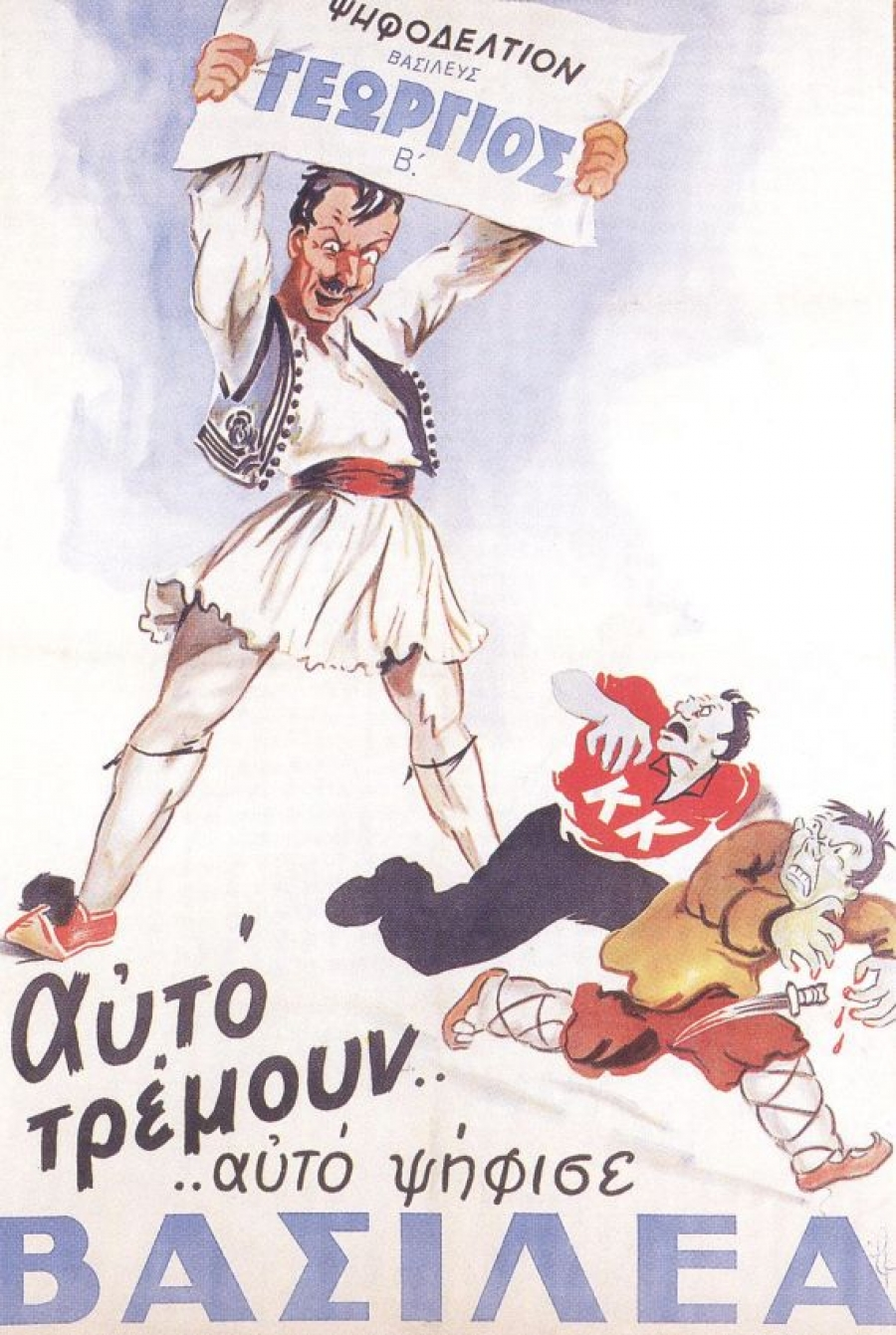
Pro-monarchist and anti-communist poster in favour of George II for the 1946 referendum: "This is what they fear! Vote for the king!"

In 1944, at the end of World War II, Nazi Germany gradually withdrew from Greece. While the majority of exiled Greeks were able to return to their country, the royal family had to remain in exile because of the growing republican opposition at home. Britain tried to reinstate George II, who remained in exile in London, but most of the resistance, in particular the communists, were opposed. Instead, George had to appoint from exile a Regency Council headed by Archbishop Damaskinos of Athens, who immediately appointed a republican-majority government headed by Nikolaos Plastiras. George, who was humiliated, ill and powerless, considered abdicating for a time in favour of his brother, but eventually decided against it.

Prince Paul, who was more combative but also more popular than his brother, would have liked to return to Greece as heir to the throne as early as the liberation of Athens in 1944, as he believed that back in his country he would have been quickly proclaimed regent, which would have blocked the way for Damaskinos and made it easier to restore the monarchy.

However, the unstable situation in the country and the polarisation between communists and bourgeois allowed the monarchists to return to power after the parliamentary elections of March 1946. After becoming prime minister, Konstantinos Tsaldaris organised a referendum on 1 September 1946 with the aim of allowing George to return to the throne. The majority in the referendum was in favour of reinstating the monarchy, at which time Constantine and his family also returned to Greece. In a country still suffering from rationing and deprivation, they moved back to the villa in Psychikó. It was there that Paul and Frederica chose to start a small school, where Constantine and his sisters received their first education under the supervision of Jocelin Winthrop Young, a British disciple of the German-Jewish educator Kurt Hahn.

The tension between communists and conservatives led, in the following years, to the Greek Civil War. That conflict was fought mainly in northern Greece. The Civil War ended in 1949, with the victory of the bourgeois and royalists, who had been supported by Britain and the United States.

== Crown Prince ==
=== Education ===
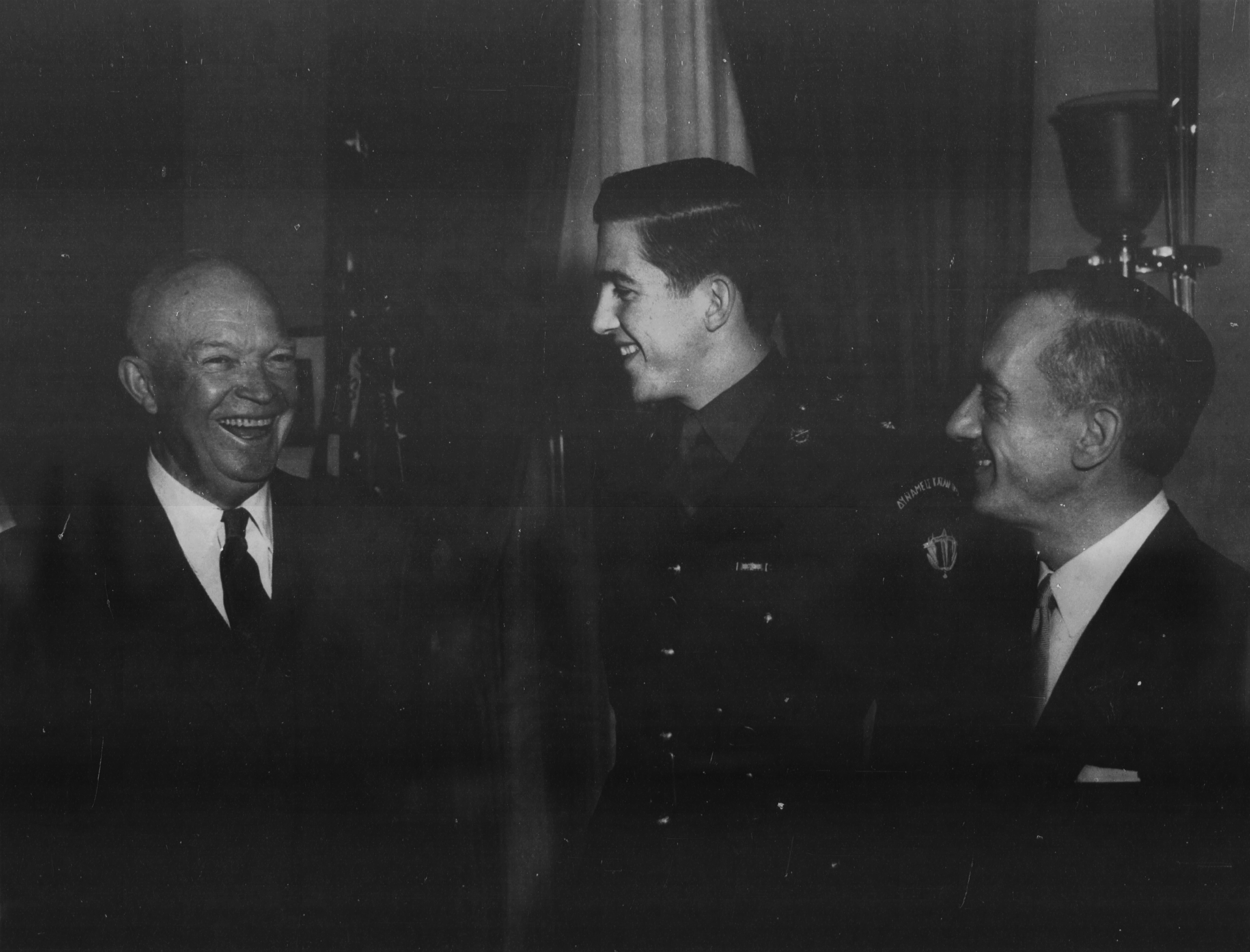
Constantine (centre) with President Eisenhower (left), 1959

During the Civil War, on 1 April 1947, George died. Thus, Constantine's father ascended the throne, and Constantine himself became Crown Prince of Greece at the age of six. He then moved with his family from the villa in Psychiko to Tatoi Palace at the foot of the Parnitha Mountains in the northern part of the Attica peninsula.

The first years of Paul's reign did not bring great upheavals in his son's daily life. Constantine and his sisters were brought up relatively simply, and communication was at the heart of the pedagogy of their parents, who spent all the time they could with their children. Supervised by various British governesses and tutors, the children spoke English in the family but were also fluent in Greek. Until he was nine, Constantine continued to be educated with his sisters and other companions from Athens' wealthier population in the villa at Psychiko.

After that age, Paul decided to begin preparing his son for the throne. He then started at the Anávryta lyceum in Marousi, northeast of Athens, which also followed Kurt Hahn's pedagogy. He attended school there as a boarder between 1950 and 1958, while his sisters attended school in Salem, Baden-Württemberg, Germany. From 1955, Constantine served in all three branches of the Hellenic Armed Forces, attending the requisite military academies. He also attended the NATO Air Force Special Weapons School in Germany, as well as the University of Athens, where he took courses in the school of law. In 1955, he received the title of Duke of Sparta.

=== Sailing and the Olympic Games ===
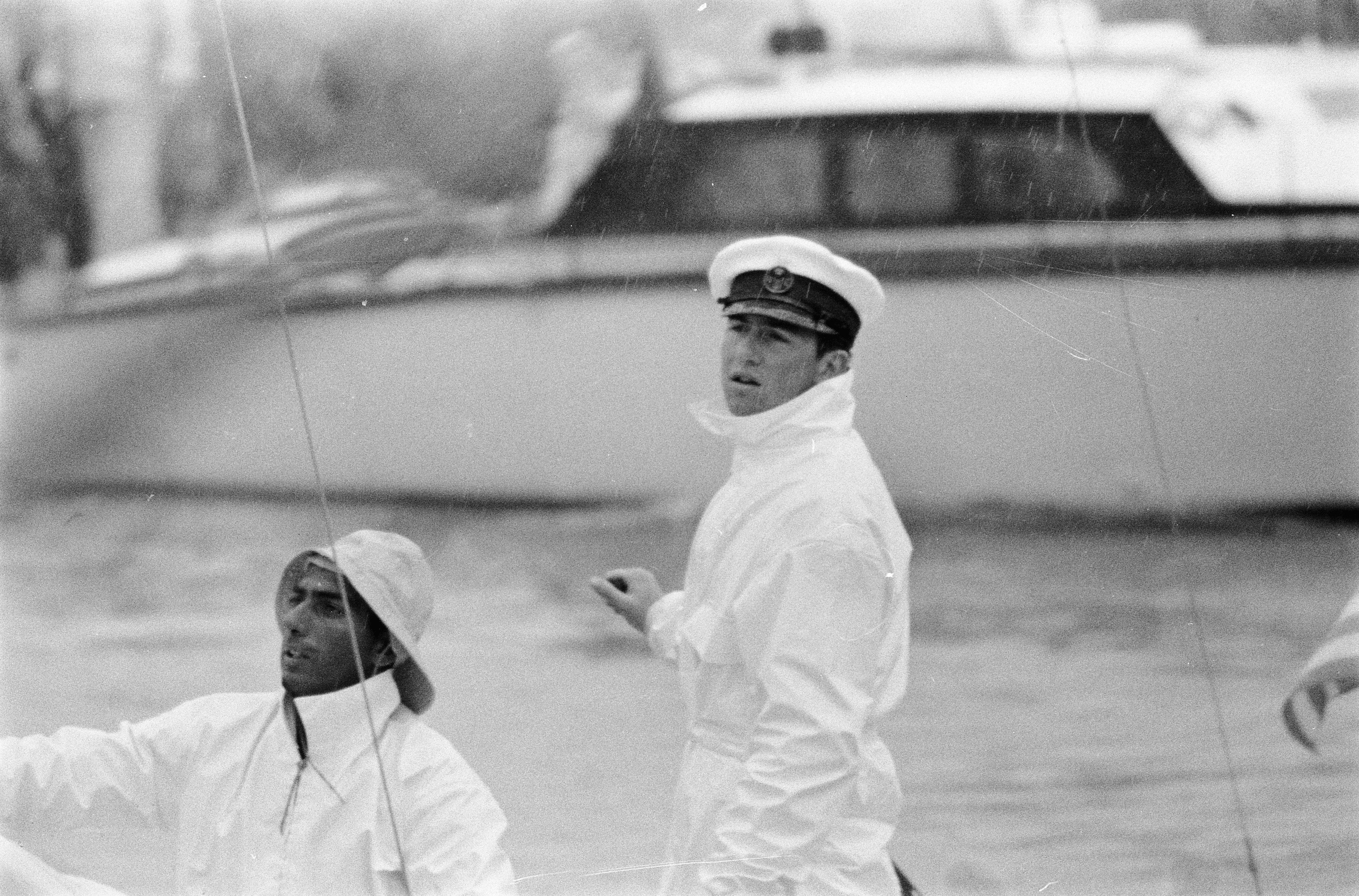
Constantine on board Nireus, 1960

Constantine was an able sportsman. In 1958, Paul gave his son a Lightning class sailing boat for Christmas. Subsequently, Constantine spent most of his free time training with the boat on the Saronic Gulf. After a few months, the Greek Navy gave the prince a Dragon class sailing boat, with which he decided to participate in the 1960 Summer Olympics in Rome. At the opening of the Games in Rome, he was the flag bearer for the Greek team. He won an Olympic gold medal in the Dragon event, which was the first Greek gold medal since the Stockholm 1912 Summer Olympics. Constantine was the helmsman of their Olympic gold-winning sailing vessel Nireus, and other members of the team included Odysseus Eskitzoglou and Georgios Zaimis.

Constantine was also a strong swimmer and had a black belt in karate, with interests in squash, track events, and riding. In 1963, Constantine became a member of the International Olympic Committee (IOC). He resigned in 1974 because he was no longer a Greek resident, and was made an honorary IOC member. He was an honorary member of the International Soling Association and president of the International Dragon Association.

== Reign ==
=== Accession and marriage ===
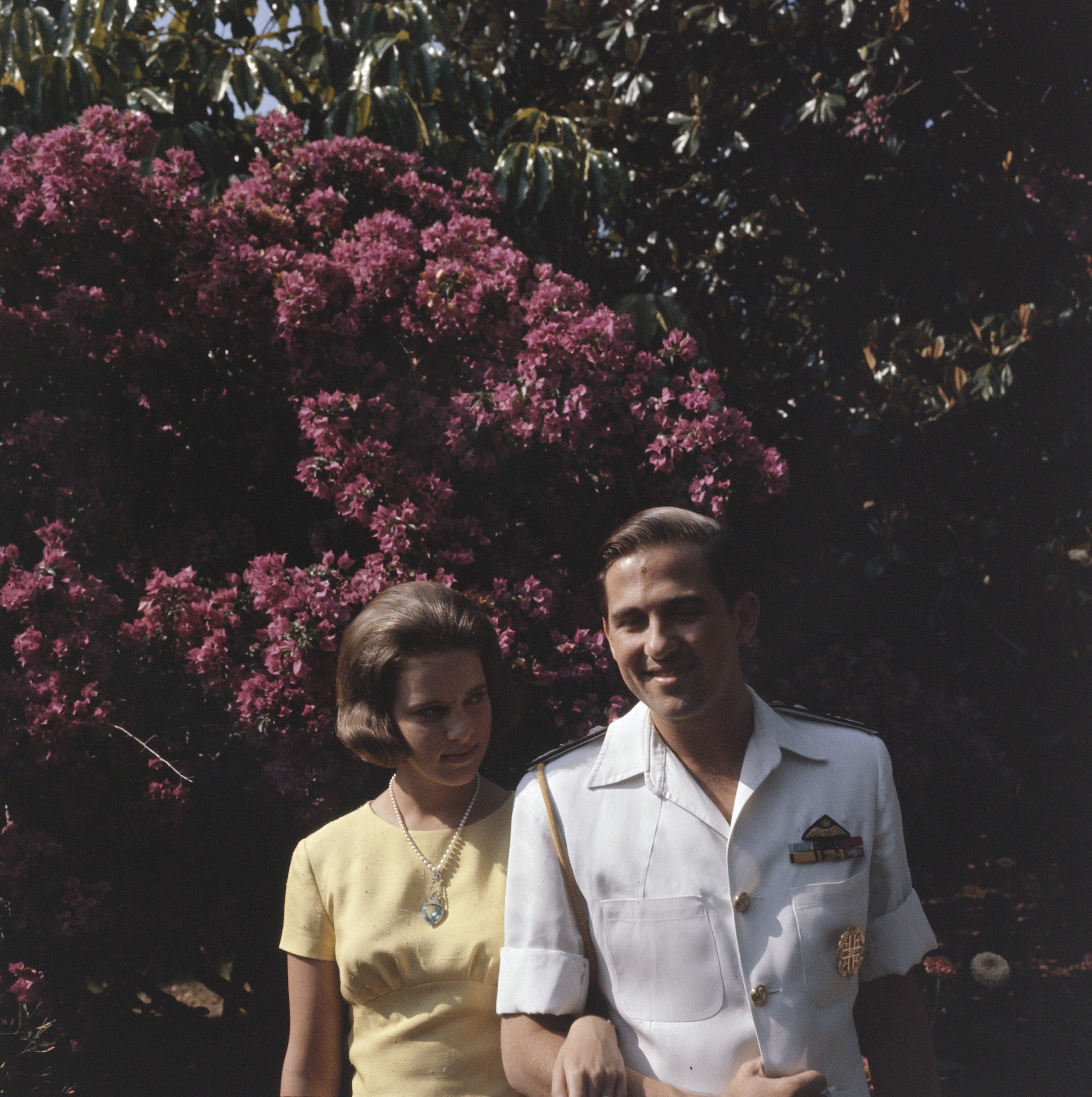
Constantine with his wife Anne-Marie in 1964

In 1964, Paul's health deteriorated rapidly. He was diagnosed with stomach cancer and underwent surgery for an ulcer in February. Prior to this, Constantine had already been appointed regent for his ailing father while waiting for his recovery. During his regency, Constantine limited himself to signing decrees and appointing members of the government, as well as accepting their resignations. As the king's condition worsened, the crown prince went to Tinos to attain an icon considered miraculous by the Greek Orthodox Church. On 6 March 1964, Paul died and the 23-year-old Constantine succeeded him as King of the Hellenes. The new king ascended the throne as Constantine II, although some of his supporters preferred to call him Constantine XIII to emphasise the continuity between the former Byzantine Empire and the Kingdom of Greece. On 23 March 1964, he was sworn in before the parliament and was invested as chief of the armed forces with the highest ranks in each branch.

Due to his youth, Constantine was also perceived as a promise of change. Greece was still feeling the effects of the Civil War and society was strongly polarised between the royalist-conservative right wing and the liberal-socialist left wing. The accession of Constantine came shortly after the election of centrist George Papandreou as prime minister in February 1964, which ended 11 years of right-wing rule by the National Radical Union (ERE). The Greek society hoped that the new king and the new prime minister would be able to overcome past dissensions. Later that year, on 18 September, Constantine married Princess Anne-Marie of Denmark in a Greek Orthodox ceremony in the Metropolitan Cathedral of Athens. Anne-Marie was the youngest daughter of King Frederik IX, and she and Constantine were third cousins.

=== Apostasia of 1965 ===
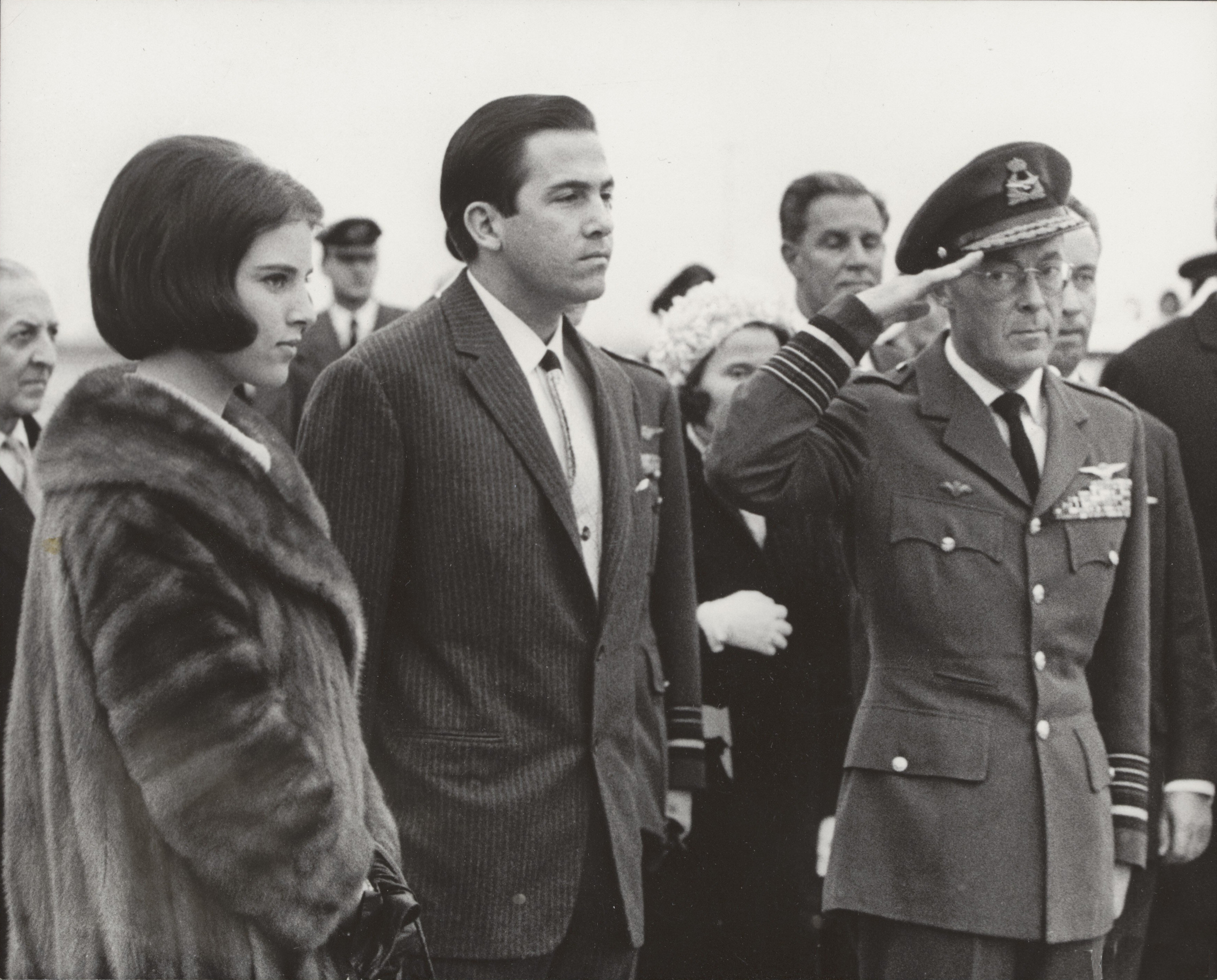
Anne-Marie and Constantine with Prince Bernhard of the Netherlands at Schiphol, 1966

Constantine succeeded to the throne at a time when Greek society was experiencing economic and employment growth. Indicating his refusal to concede any power to the elected government, in September 1964, when there was yet no sign of his conflict with Papandreou, Constantine asked US Ambassador Henry Labouisse whether he "wanted him to get rid" of Papandreou, although he admitted he was not presently able to do so. The topic was discussed in subsequent conversations and in January 1965, before the emergence of the ASPIDA case, Constantine stated he considered inadvisable for the time being to adopt counsel he was receiving to clash with the Papandreou government due to the popular support it enjoyed. Political instability worsened in 1965. At a meeting with Papandreou that took place on 11 July 1965 in Corfu, Constantine requested that those implicated in the ASPIDA scandal, in which several military officials tried to prevent attempts by the extreme right-wing military to seize power, be referred to a military tribunal. Papandreou agreed and raised with him his intention to dismiss the then minister of defence, Petros Garoufalias, so that he could take charge himself of the ministry. Constantine refused, as the scandal wrongly implicated the prime minister's son, Andreas Papandreou. After several clashes by letter between the monarch and the prime minister, Papandreou resigned on 15 July. Following the resignation, at least 39 members of Parliament left Centre Union.

Constantine and Anne-Marie at the wedding of Prince Karl of Hesse and Countess Yvonne Szapáry, in The Hague, 1966

Constantine appointed a new government led by Georgios Athanasiadis-Novas, speaker of the parliament, which was formed by defectors disaffected with the Papandreous (the "Apostates"). Soon, thousands of citizens took to the streets to protest against Constantine's decision, unprecedented protests that led to clashes with the Cities Police. On 21 July 1965, the protests in the centre of Athens came to a head, and in one of these clashes a policeman killed the 25-year-old student Sotiris Petroulas, leader of the student movement and of the "Lambrakis Youth". His death became a symbol of the protests and his funeral was widely attended. Due to Constantine's personal involvement and his clash with Papandreou, the protests -the largest, most persistent and combative since 1944- featured explicitly anti-monarchical slogans and the monarchy turned into a point of contention. Athanasiadis-Novas's government did not receive a vote of confidence from parliament and Athanasiadis-Novas resigned on 5 August 1965. The two big parties, National Radical Union and Centre Union, asked Constantine to call elections, but he asked Stefanos Stefanopoulos to form a government. He then ordered Ilias Tsirimokos to form a government on 18 August but he did not receive the vote of confidence of the parliament on a vote on 28 August either. Constantine finally ordered Stefanopoulos to form a government and obtained the parliamentary confidence on 17 December 1965. An end to the crisis seemed in sight when on 20 December 1966, Papandreou, ERE leader Panagiotis Kanellopoulos and the king reached a resolution; elections would be held under a straightforward system of proportional representation where all parties participating agreed to compete, and that, in any outcome, the command structure of the army would not be altered. The third "apostate" government fell on 22 December 1966, and was succeeded by Ioannis Paraskevopoulos, who was to govern until the parliamentary elections of 28 May 1967, which were expected to favour a victory for Georgios Papandreou's Centre Union. Paraskevopoulos resigned and Kanellopoulos stepped in to fill the role of the Prime Minister on 3 April 1967 until the election.

=== Greek dictatorship of 1967–1974 ===
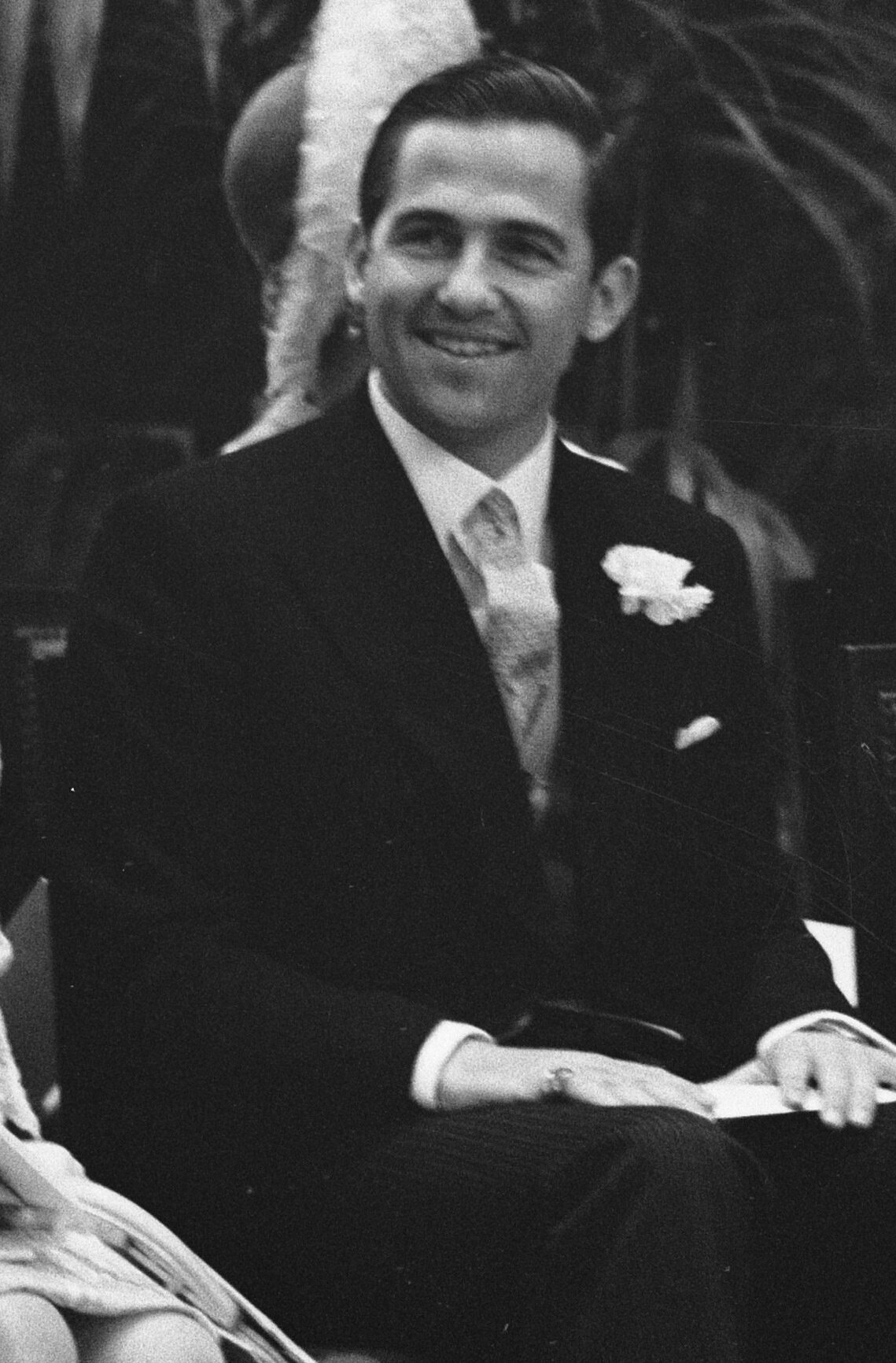
Constantine as king in 1966, a year before the junta

Historians have suspected that Constantine and his mother were interested in a coup d'état from mid-1965 at the latest. US Army Attaché Charles Perkins reported that military right-wing group "Sacred Bond of Greek Officers" (IDEA) "plans for coup and military dictatorship in Greece", that Constantine was aware and that the group was aware that any operation in this direction with the cooperation of the US must have the permission of the king. According to Charilaos Lagoudakis, a US State Department expert on Greece, by mid-1966 Constantine had already approved a coup plan. On the other hand, Conservative MP C.M. Woodhouse rejects as "certainly untrue" source evidence that in his talks with Talbot, Constantine considered establishing a dictatorship, a stance that historian Mogens Pelt attributes to royalist Woodhouse's wish to salvage the king's reputation.

A traditionalist, right-wing nationalist group of middle-ranking army officers led by Colonel George Papadopoulos took action first and staged a coup d'état on 21 April using the fear of "communist danger" as the main reason for the coup. Tanks rolled through the streets of Athens, rifle shots were heard and military songs were played on the radio until the announcement that "The Hellenic Armed Forces have undertaken the governance of the country" was made public. Some high-ranking politicians were arrested, as well as the commander-in-chief of the army. The coup leaders met Constantine at his residence in Tatoi at about 7 a.m., which was surrounded by tanks to prevent resistance and the coup seemed to have succeeded bloodlessly. Constantine later recounted that the officers of the tank platoons believed they were carrying out the coup under his orders. They asked Constantine to swear in the new government. Despite the detained Prime Minister Kanellopoulos urging resistance, Constantine compromised with them to avoid bloodshed and in the afternoon swore in a new military government. He did, however, insist on appointing Supreme Court prosecutor Konstantinos Kollias as prime minister. On 26 April, in his speech on the new regime, he affirmed that "I am sure that with the will of God, with your efforts and above all with the help of the people, the organisation of a State of Law, an authentic and healthy democracy". According to the then-US ambassador to Greece, Phillips Talbot, Constantine expressed his anger at this situation, revealed to him that he no longer had control of the army and claimed that "incredibly stupid extreme right-wing bastards with control of the tanks are leading Greece to destruction".

From his inauguration as king, Constantine already manifested his disagreements with Archbishop Chrysostomos II of Athens. With the military dictatorship, he had the opportunity to be removed from the Greek Orthodox Cephaly, in fact it was one of the first measures with which Constantine collaborated with the Junta. On 28 April 1967, Chrysostomos II was retained and was forced to resign after having to sign one of the two versions of the letter brought to him by an official of the royal palace. Finally, Ieronymos Kotsonis was elected as archbishop by the junta's and Constantine's proposal on 13 May 1967.

=== Royal countercoup of 13 December 1967 and exile ===
From the outset, the relationship between Constantine and the regime of the colonels was an uneasy one, especially when he refused to sign the decree imposing martial law and asked Talbot to flee Greece in an American helicopter with his family. But the administration of US president Lyndon B. Johnson wanted to keep Constantine in Greece to negotiate with the junta for the return of democracy. The presence of the United States Sixth Fleet in the Aegean Sea outraged the junta government, which forced Constantine to get rid of his private secretary, Michail Arnaoutis. Arnaoutis, who had served as the king's military instructor in the 1950s and became his close friend, was generally reviled among the public for his role in the palace intrigues of the previous years. The junta, considering him an able and dangerous plotter, dismissed him from the army. The king and his entourage were beginning to worry that the future of the monarchy was endangered. Constantine visited the United States in the following days and in a meeting with Johnson, Constantine asked for military aid for a countercoup he was planning, but without success. The junta, however, had information about Constantine's conspiracy. Constantine later described himself as having the idea of a countercoup ten minutes after he found out about the junta's rise to power.

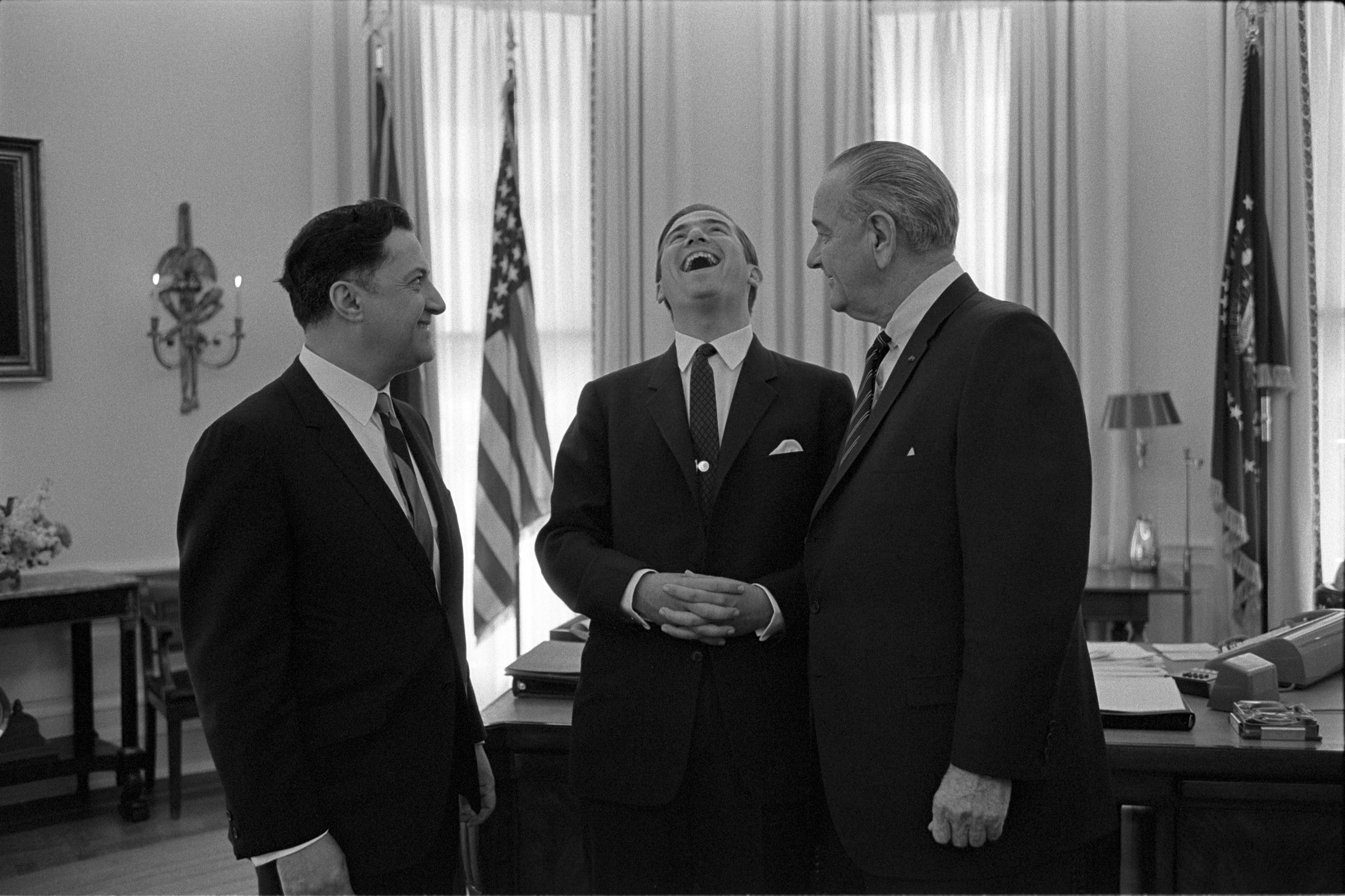
Constantine (middle) with President Johnson (right) in the Oval Office, 1967

Constantine began negotiations with the officials loyal to him in the summer of 1967. His objective was to mobilise the units of the army loyal to him and to restore parliamentary legitimacy. The action was planned by Lieutenant General Konstantinos Dovas. Several military authorities joined the plan, including lieutenant general Antonakos, chief of the air force, Konstantinos Kollias, lieutenant general Kechagias, Ioannis Manettas, brigadier generals Erselman and Vidalis, major general Zalochoris, and others, so it was expected that the counterattack would be successful. The king communicated with Konstantinos Karamanlis, who was exiled in Paris and aware of the plot, and attempted to persuade him return to assume the post of prime minister if this movement was successful, but he refused. The main objective of the plan drawn up by the movement was that all the units initiated would occupy Thessaloniki and the king would send a message to the public. It would follow the military operations in Tempi, Larissa and Lamia by the army and the swearing in of a new government by Archbishop Ieronymos with the participation of the centrist Georgios Mavros. Constantine and the involved officials began to realise that the plan could fail as they didn't count on the active support of American intelligence, who were aware of the details of the plan. They intended to initiate their plan on the day of a military parade scheduled for 28 October, but the junta-installed Chief of the Hellenic Army General Staff, Odysseas Angelis, refused to mobilise the units that Georgios Peridis requested. The abortive attempt, along with the visit of Constantine together with Peridis to some military divisions, were noted by the junta.

On the morning of the day the countercoup had been rescheduled to, 13 December 1967, after eight months of planning the countercoup, the royal family flew to Kavala, east of Thessaloniki, accompanied by Prime Minister Konstantinos Kollias who was informed at that moment of Constantine's plan. They arrived at 11:30 a.m. and were well received by the citizens. But some conspirators were neutralised, such as General Manettas, and Odysseas Angelis informed the public of the plan, asking citizens to obey his orders minutes before telecommunications were cut off. By noon, all the airbases, except one in Athens, had joined the royalist movement, and fleet leader Vice Admiral Dedes, before being arrested, ordered successfully the whole fleet sail towards Kavala in obedience to the king. They did not manage to take Thessaloniki and it soon became apparent that the senior officers were not in control of their units. This, along with the arrest of several officers, including the capture of Peridis that afternoon, and the delay in the execution of some orders, led to the countercoup's failure.

The junta, led by Georgios Papadopoulos, on the same day appointed General Georgios Zoitakis as Regent of Greece. Archbishop Ieronymos swore Zoitakis into office in Athens. Constantine, the royal family and Konstantinos Kollias took off in torrential rain from Kavala for exile in Rome, where they arrived at 4 p.m. on 14 December, with their plane having only five minutes of fuel left. In 2004, Constantine said that he would have done everything the same, but with more caution. Two weeks after his exile, photos of Constantine and his family celebrating Christmas with normality in the Greek Ambassador to Italy's home reached Greek media, which didn't do Constantine's reputation "any favour". He remained in exile in Italy through the rest of military rule, although he technically continued as king until 1 June 1973. He was never to return to Greece as a reigning monarch.

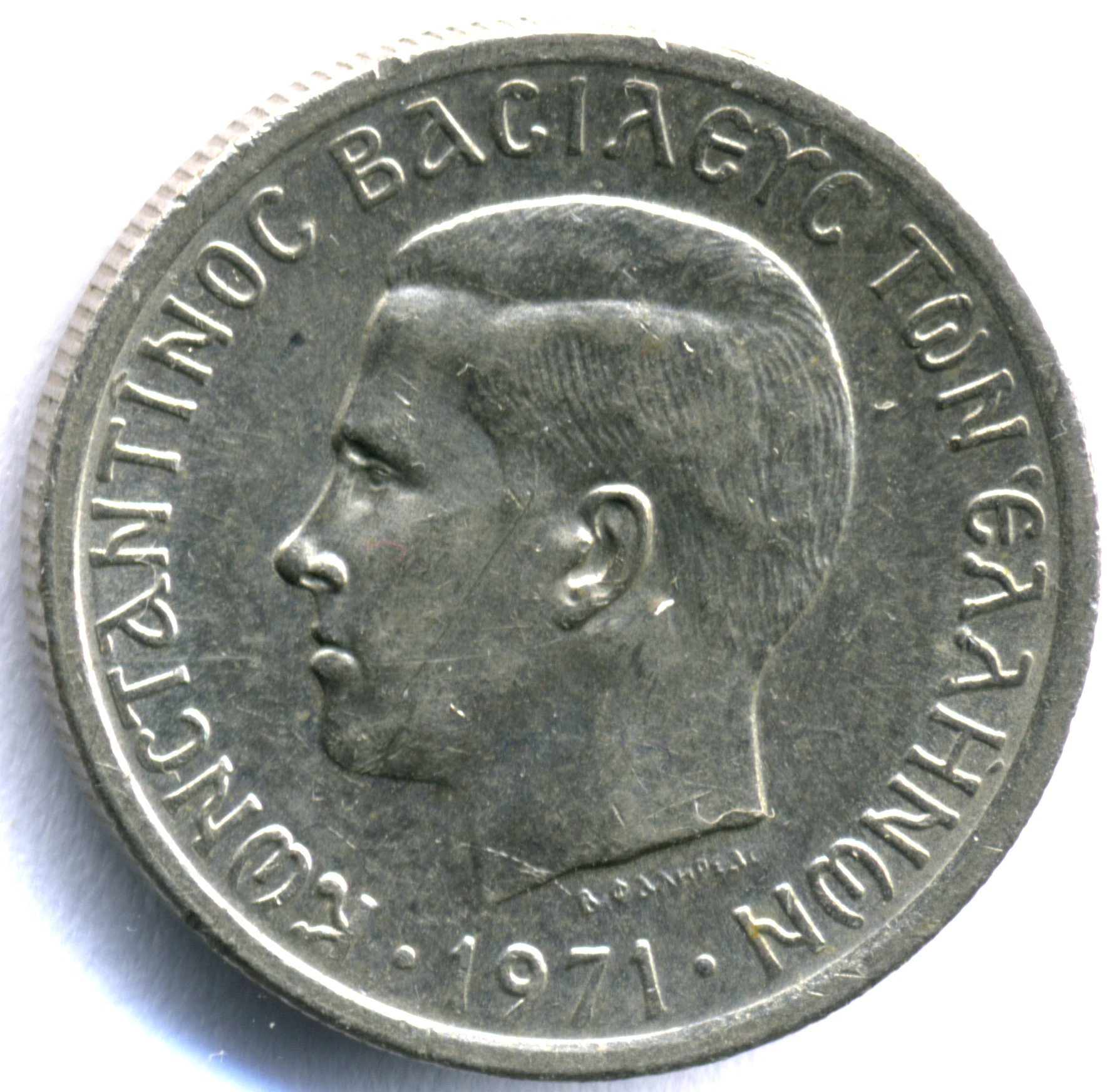
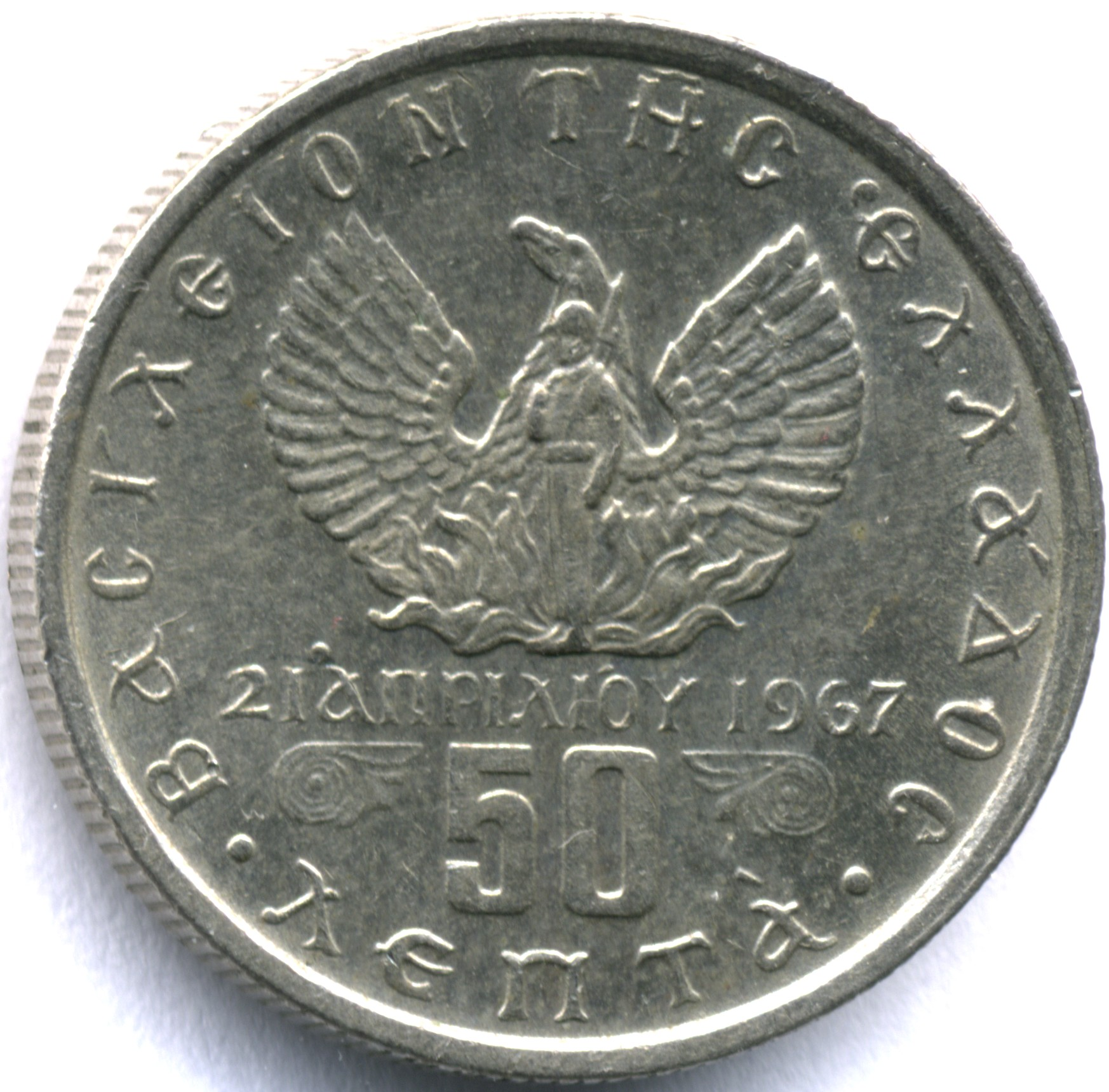
Despite his exile, Constantine remained formally head of state of Greece until 1973. He still appeared on coinage (left), but the royal coat of arms was replaced by the junta's symbol, the phoenix (right).

Constantine stated, "I am sure I shall go back the way my ancestors did." He said to the Toronto Star:

I consider myself King of the Hellenes and sole expression of legality in my country until the Greek people freely decide otherwise. I fully expected that the (military) regime would depose me eventually. They are frightened of the Crown because it is a unifying force among the people.

Throughout the dictatorship, Constantine maintained contact with the junta, maintaining direct communication with the colonels and kept the royal subsidy until 1973. On 21 March 1972, Papadopoulos became Regent. At the end of May 1973, senior officers of the Greek navy organised an abortive coup to overthrow the junta government, but failed. The dictators considered Constantine to be involved, so on 1 June, with a constitutional act, Papadopoulos declared the monarchy abolished. He converted the country into a presidential and parliamentary state and assumed the interim presidency of the republic. In June 1973, Papadopoulos condemned Constantine as "a collaborator with foreign forces and with murderers" and accused him of "pursuing ambitions to become a political leader". The referendum of 29 July confirmed the end of the Greek monarchy and the end of the reign of Constantine. That year, the junta expropriated the palace of Tatoi and offered the king 120 million drachmas, money that Constantine refused.

== Restoration of democracy and the referendum ==
The Turkish invasion of Cyprus led to the downfall of the military regime, and Konstantinos Karamanlis returned from exile to become prime minister. The 1973 republican constitution was regarded as illegitimate, and the new administration issued a decree restoring the 1952 constitution. Constantine expected an invitation to return. On 24 July, he declared his "deep satisfaction with the initiative of the armed forces in overthrowing the dictatorial regime" and welcomed the advent of Karamanlis as prime minister.

Following the appointment of a civilian government in November 1974 after the first post-junta legislative election, Karamanlis called a referendum, held on 8 December 1974, on whether Greece would restore the monarchy or remain a republic. Although he had been the leader of the traditionally monarchist right, Karamanlis made no attempt to encourage a vote in favour of restoring the monarch. The king was not allowed by the government to return to Greece to campaign for the restoration of constitutional monarchy. He was only allowed to broadcast to the Greek people from London on television. Analysts claim this was a deliberate act by the government to reduce the possibility of a vote in favour of restoration.

Constantine, speaking from London, said he had made mistakes in the past. He said he would always be supportive of democracy in the future and promised that his mother would stay away from the country. Local monarchists campaigned on his behalf. The vote to restore the monarchy was only about 31% with most of the support coming from the Peloponnese region. Almost 69% of the electorate voted against the restoration of the monarchy and for the establishment of a republic.

== Post-reign ==
Constantine remained in exile for 40 years after the vote in favour of the republic, living in Italy and the United Kingdom. He returned briefly for the first time in February 1981, which was to attend the funeral of his mother in the family cemetery of the former Royal Palace at Tatoi. The funeral was generally controversial, due to the little empathy generated by Queen Frederica and the royal family, which is why the government authorised him to stay only for six hours in the country. His gesture of kissing the ground upon arrival in Greece was also polemic as it was considered an act of provocation for the antiroyalists.

=== Abortive conspiracies ===
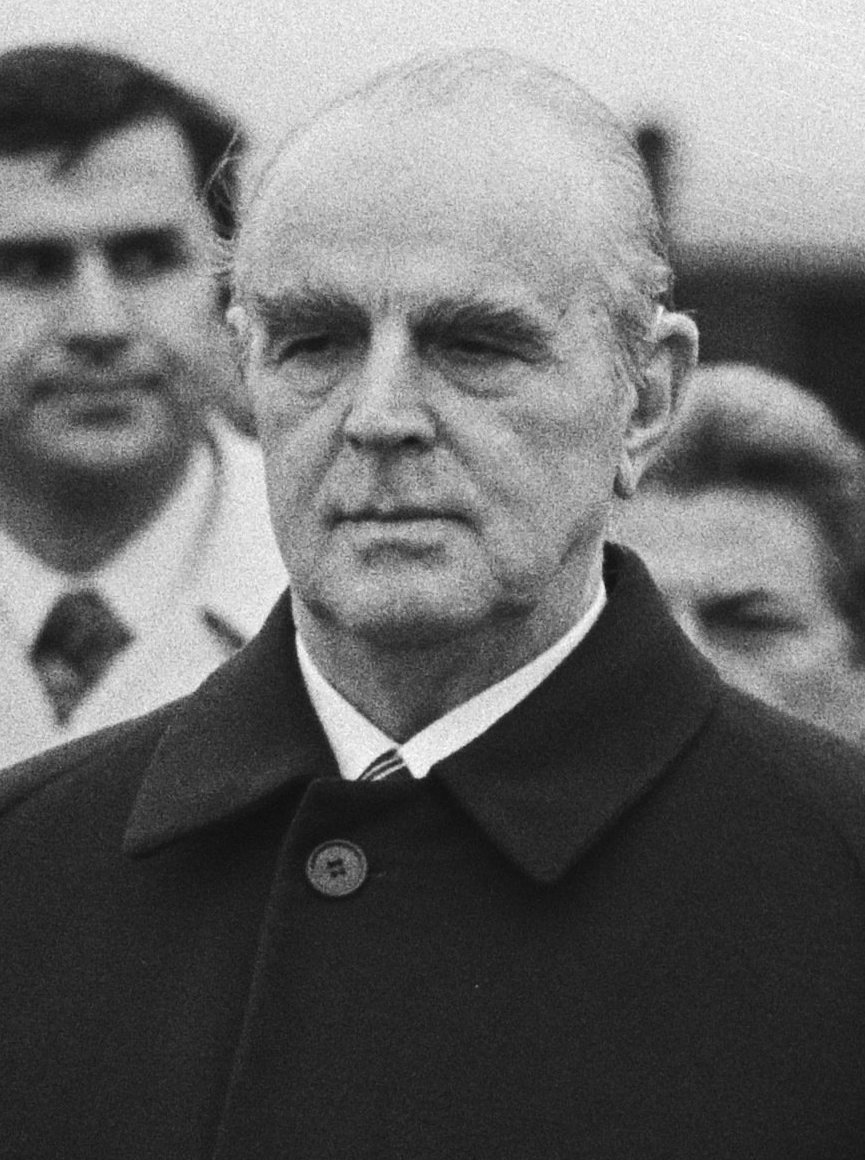
Konstantinos Karamanlis in 1978

The posthumously published archives of Konstantinos Karamanlis, as well as the memoirs of Constantine's former marshal of the court, Leonidas Papagos, revealed that from 1975 to 1978, Constantine was involved in a conspiracy to overthrow the democratic government, including the assassination of Karamanlis and a following referendum on the monarchy. Constantine's close confidant, Michail Arnaoutis, approached high-ranking officers to try to gain their support. After some naval officers approached expressed doubts that Arnaoutis spoke for the former king, the chief engineer of the fleet was invited to London, where Constantine confirmed the basic outline of the plot as relayed by Arnaoutis. The naval officers approached informed Karamanlis, who sent Papagos to warn Constantine to "stop conspiring" and the former monarch denied knowledge of the conspiracy, but when called upon, Arnaoutis confirmed his contacts with officers in Greece in the presence of both Constantine and Papagos. The events were confirmed in 1999 by one of the officers whom Arnaoutis had approached, Vice Admiral Ioannis Vasileiadis, after the publication of Papagos' memoirs. According to Vasileiadis, Arnaoutis said that Constantine had contacted Mohammad Reza Pahlavi, the Shah of Iran, in order to prevent possible Turkish military action during the coup.

Karamanlis was also alerted to Constantine's suspicious activities by the British secret services, who had apparently taped his conversations with Greek visitors. In October 1976, the Greek prime minister was informed by the British ambassador that Constantine, while not the driving force behind the conspiracy, was very much aware of it and did nothing to discourage it. The British also provided warnings that sympathisers had informed Constantine that a coup would take place in November 1976, led by low-ranking army officers loyal to former dictator Dimitrios Ioannidis. Karamanlis and his chief diplomatic adviser, Petros Molyviatis, applied pressure on both the British and US governments, which led to a personal intervention by British prime minister James Callaghan, who warned Constantine off. The Greek government repeatedly sent envoys to the former king for the same purpose, but he denied any knowledge of the affair. Karamanlis chose not to publicise it in order to not destabilise the fragile democratic system in Greece. Nevertheless, in October 1978, Constantine and Arnaoutis were recorded by Greek agents to have sought contact with military and political leaders, trying to win them over to the cause of a royal restoration.

=== Visits to Greece ===
==== 12 February 1981 ====
The first visit of Constantine and the former royal family to Greece took place on 12 February 1981, on the occasion of the funeral of his mother, Frederica. She had died in Madrid on 6 February, and it was the wish of both her and her descendants that she be buried next to her husband in the cemetery of Tatoi. As soon as Constantine's communication with the government of then Prime Minister George Rallis about the details of the funeral became known to the press, an intense political dispute erupted. Only six years had passed since the referendum and the controversies between the two sides - pro-royalist and anti-royalist - were still fresh. The opposition even raised the issue of a burial ban, a demand that was clearly illegal but indicative of the polarisation that existed. The Rallis government was therefore asked to find a compromise solution. Although the royal entourage's preference for a lay-in-state ceremony in Athens metropolitan cathedral followed by a burial in Tatoi, the Rallis government, in the midst of fierce confrontations with the opposition, decided that both the funeral and the burial should take place in Tatoi to avoid the possibility of violent clashes between pro- and anti-royal supporters. Constantine and his family could only stay on Greek soil for six hours, as long as they needed to carry out their duties. The former royal family arrived at Ellinikon airport and Constantine disembarked, bent down and kissed the ground. This token gesture added new fuel to the controversy, with some interpreting it as genuine love of country and others as hypocrisy. The funeral and burial took place under police protection. However, the police were unable to keep the crowds of supporters of the former king away from the site.

==== August 1993 ====
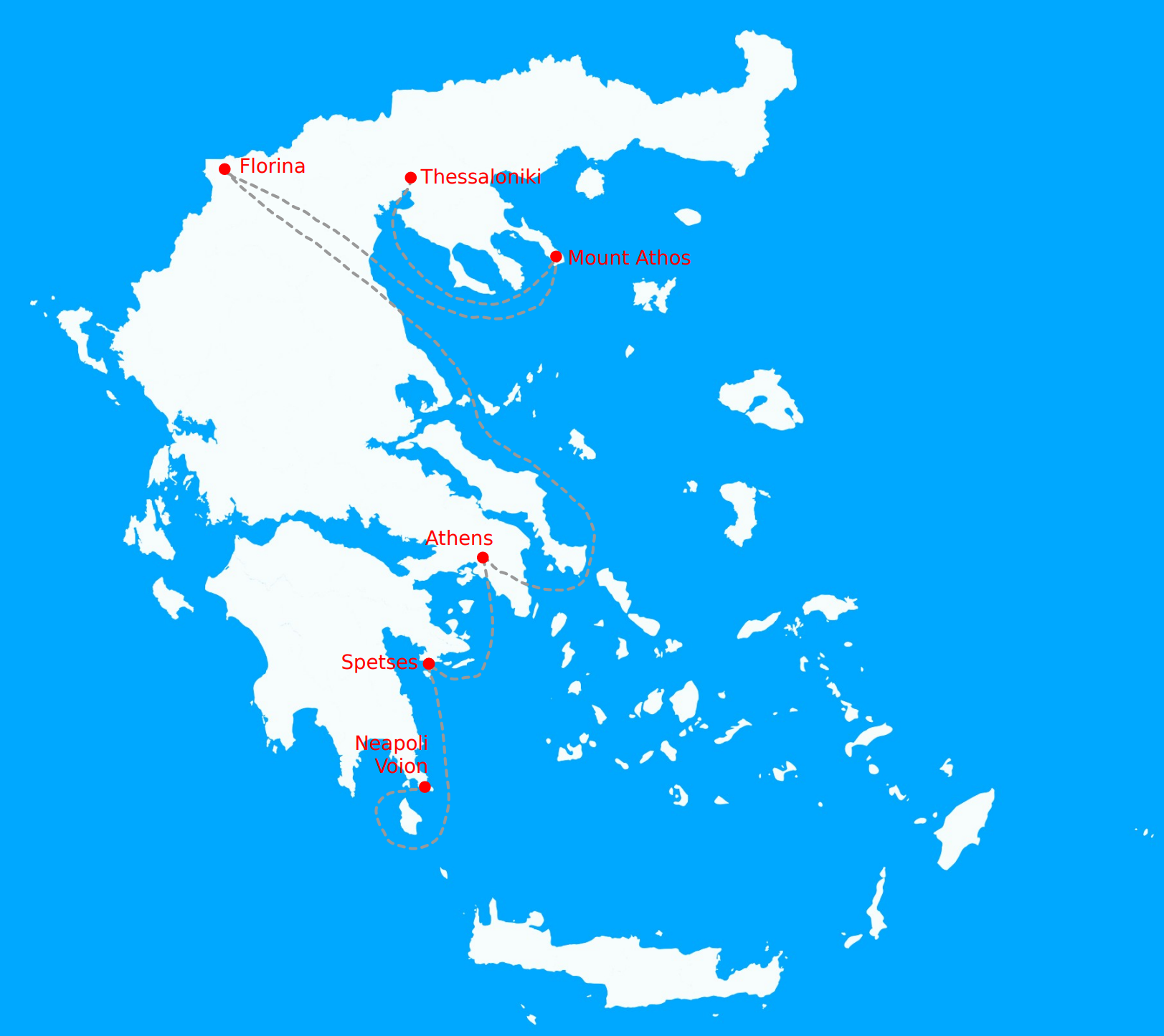
Map of Constantine's 1993 journey in Greece, starting in Thessaloniki and ending in Neapoli Voion.

At the funeral of King Baudouin of Belgium, a private agreement was made between Constantine and the new conservative Greek prime minister, Konstantinos Mitsotakis, that allowed Constantine and his family to temporarily return to Greece on a holiday. Constantine was accompanied by his wife Anne-Marie, their five children, and his sister Irene. The family had decided that yachting around Greece would be the best way to showcase the country to their children, who were unable to grow up within Greece. The opposition claimed that the government was attempting to reinstate the monarchy. On 9 August 1993, the family departed from the UK on two planes, including a jet donated to Constantine by King Hussein of Jordan. The Greek government was unaware of Constantine and his family's holiday, which had been planned and charted by Princess Alexia. Constantine, and then his family a few hours later, landed in Thessaloniki, before boarding a yacht.

The family's yacht then travelled 300 metres off the shore of Mount Athos. Constantine and his two eldest sons, Crown Prince Pavlos and Prince Nikolaos, travelled upon a dinghy to get to the mainland, where women were not allowed to visit. Upon arriving, Constantine noticed his portrait in every monastery and learnt that the monks there had been praying for him every day since his exile. Nine monks followed Constantine back to their yacht to bless the rest of his family, display holy relics and present gifts. Constantine then took a helicopter and landed on a soccer pitch in Florina, where "hundreds" of people greeted him with handshakes and flowers. Constantine's decision to land in Florina was named a "politically sensitive spot to appear in" in view of the region's greater support for the monarchy over other regions and due to the Macedonia naming dispute. Constantine and his family took a van north in order see the northernmost part of Greece, and were reportedly followed by between 50 and 100 cars. However, the Greek government had organised for the police to block the road, claiming that Constantine's journey was "a political step", rather than touristic. Protestors attempted to open up the road, but failed. In the next village the family stopped at, a local government official told Constantine that he would be kicked out of Greece if he did not act like a tourist.

Following this clash between police and protestors in support of Constantine, Mitsotakis made a public statement explaining that the government "had no prior knowledge of the visit and had never agreed to it. Strong action will be taken if the ex-king violates our conditions." Afterwards, Constantine and his family returned to Athens to visit Tatoi Palace and his parents' graves, where a short memorial service was held. During this trip, Constantine chose where his future tomb would be. Telling Sky News presenter Selina Scott, Constantine said that having to leave his belongings when going into exile taught him that "material things are not that important". He also expressed his wishes to move back into the property and clean up the land surrounding it. Constantine was then warned by the government to move on from Tatoi and alerted them of protestors who were threatening to burn Tatoi's forestry down.

Whilst travelling to Spetses, the government ordered that Constantine should not travel to heavily populated areas, to which Constantine said, "It's a free country". When he arrived at a port in Spetses, a harbour policeman jumped onto their boat, but Constantine pushed him to the side and set foot on the mainland. A crowd greeted Constantine and his family, but at night and during the following day, their yacht was surrounded by government ships and flown over by military planes. Constantine then contacted Sky News UK and was interviewed by presenter David Blaine, to whom Constantine told on live air that he was being harassed by the government, who had "frightened the daylights" out of his children. Constantine's yacht was on course to stop at Gytheio, where a reported 5,000 to 10,000 people were waiting for him. Military warships were denying the yacht's progress towards the town, so Constantine stopped in Neapoli Voion, where there was a crowd of a few hundred people, but also many anti-monarchists. Following this stop, Constantine and his family returned to the UK.

=== Legal quarrels over the royal properties ===
==== Properties and citizenship ====
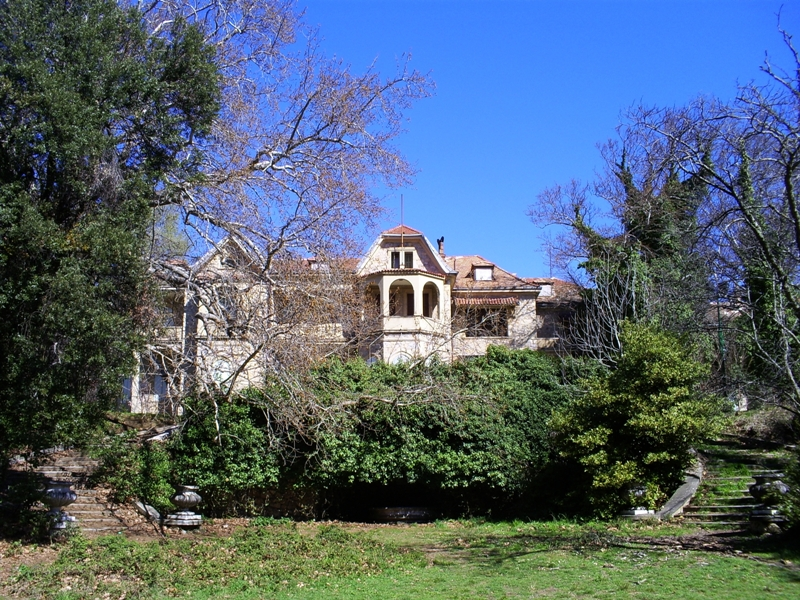
Tatoi Palace (pictured) was seized from Constantine by the government.

A long-standing dispute between the former royal family and the Greek state over the ownership of movable and immovable property which, prior to the constitutional change of the Metapolitefsi, was considered to be the property of King Constantine was resolved in 2002. The European Court of Human Rights condemned Greece for violating Article 1 of the First Protocol and awarded the former royal family compensation of €13.7 million. (Note: According to Evangelos Venizelos "The Strasbourg judgment accepts that Tatoi Palace, Mon Repos, Corfu and Royal estate of Polydendri constitute the individual property of the applicants. It accepts that Law No. 2215/1994 is in conformity with the Greek Constitution and that it constitutes the legal basis for the valid expropriation of such property for sufficient reasons of public interest. It requests, however, that an adequate or, rather, "some" compensation be determined for the applicants, since their rights under Article 1 of the Additional Protocol to the ECHR have been violated.") The legal basis of the dispute was determined by the interpretation of royal property as private or public. According to the royal family, the property was acquired by their predecessors through legal means (purchases) from their personal estates and was therefore considered the inheritance of the former king. In the eyes of the Greek public, however, the property was a by-product of the institution of the monarchy and served to enable the supreme ruler to exercise his role as monarch. With the demise of the monarchy, the property should automatically pass to the state.

In 1973, Decree No. 225 expropriated the movable and immovable property of the former king and members of the royal family for the benefit of the state. In September 1974, the government of National Salvation, headed by Constantine Karamanlis revoked the junta's decree in anticipation of the referendum that would determine the country's constitution. Although the referendum abolished the monarchy, the government did not proceed with the confiscation of property. Instead, it set up a seven-member commission to administer the property. This committee later handed over its responsibilities to the legal representative of the royal family in Greece, retired admiral Mario Stavridis. Thus, members of the royal family continued to declare their property as inherited and to file inheritance and income tax returns, and the tax administration continued to assess taxes and impose surcharges and fines. In 1984, Constantine took the initiative to approach the Greek government to settle the former royal family's tax debts to the Greek state. An agreement was finally reached in 1992, under the government of Konstantinos Mitsotakis with Law 2086/1992. The agreement - which was never implemented - included the payment by the royal family of 183,000,000 drachmas in cash from the total amount of inheritance tax due, while the rest was to be covered by the concession of 81 hectares (200 acres) to the state, 400 acres (160 ha) to the "World Hippocratic Hospital Foundation and Research Centre" to be built a huge hospital complex, and 15,146 hectares (37,426 acres) to the "Tatoi National Park". In the agreement there was no specific provision for the so-called "summer palace" of Tatoi, for Mon Repo, for Polydendri and for mobile things. All these were considered the King's property.

In 1993, on the occasion of the visit of the royal family to Greece, Andreas Papandreou announced the legislative settlement of the outstanding issues. In fact, on the basis of the consultative document drafted by Evangelos Venizelos for the Municipality of Corfu to strengthen their claim to Mon Repos, when PASOK returned to power under, it abolished the previous law and replaced it with 2215/1994. The Law confiscated the King's property for the benefit of the state without the right to compensation and deprived the members of the royal family of their Greek citizenship. The royal family immediately appealed to the country's civil courts. Although upheld by the Supreme Civil and Criminal Court of Greece, the decision was overturned by the Council of State. The Special Highest Court, to which the case was referred in 1997, agreed with the Council of State. All legal remedies in Greece had been depleted. The royal family therefore turned to the European courts.

I feel the Greek government have acted unjustly and vindictively. They treat me sometimes as if I am their enemy – I am not the enemy. I consider it the greatest insult in this world for a Greek to be told he is not a Greek or for a Greek to be told that he has to apply for his nationality. I was born Greek, I am Greek and I will die Greek, and there are certain things that every human being will not go further with. You cannot push an individual further and this is my limit.

— Constantine II upon his decision to take the Greek government to court.

An appeal to the European Commission of Human Rights was lodged by Constantine, Anna-Marie, their five children, Princess Irene and Princess Catherine. His sister, Queen Sophia, did not take part because she had already renounced her rights to the estate. The court allowed the appeal, but only for Constantine, Irene and Catherine. In October 1998, the European Commission admitted the property issue when all 30 judges unanimously ruled that human rights had been violated and referred the matter to the European Court of Human Rights. Constitutional lawyer Nikos Alivizatos, a member of the team of lawyers who represented the Greek State in the trial, pointed out that the trial was considered historic, as it was the most important property case to come before them. The former royal family challenged the expropriation without compensation of 17,000 hectares (42,000 acres) in Tatoi, 93 hectares (230 acres) in Corfu and 13,000 hectares (33,000 acres) in Polydendri, Larissa. The total amount demanded by the former king was 168.7 billion drachmas. The court also encouraged six months of meetings between Constantine and the Greek government to coordinate a settlement, however the Greek government refused. The court also defined the former king's litigation assets as private, ruling that the property that accompanied the institution of the monarchy had already been automatically transferred to the state, meaning that the Greek state could award Constantine monetary compensation, rather than returning his royal properties. (Note: as property arising from the office of monarch, were transferred to the state, Royal Palace of Psychiko, Presidential Mansion, Athens and Palataki (Thessaloniki)) The Greek State was therefore obliged to compensate the plaintiffs, setting the appropriate compensation at 1/40th of the amount claimed, i.e. 4.7 billion drachmas (13.7 million euro). The money was collected in March 2003. With the compensation, the former king set up the "Anna Maria Foundation" to allocate the funds back to the Greek people for use in "extraordinary natural disasters" and charitable causes.

The court decision also ruled that Constantine's human rights were not violated by the Greek state's decision not to grant him Greek citizenship and passport unless he adopts a surname. Constantine said of this "the law basically said that I had to go out and acquire a name. The problem is that my family originates from Denmark and the Danish royal family haven't got a surname." Constantine and his family ultimately did not receive their Greek citizenship back. Although originally requesting Spanish citizenships, Anne-Marie eventually requested of her sister, Margrethe II of Denmark, to have Danish diplomatic passports instated in the names of the members of the Greek royal family. She agreed and in their Danish passports, Constantine and Anne-Marie's names were established as "HM King Constantine II" and "HM Queen Anne-Marie". On 20 December 2024, over two decades after the court ruling and almost two years after Constantine's death, his descendants received Greek citizenship upon adopting the surname "De Grèce" (Ντε Γκρες; "of Greece"), which had been used by Prince Michael of Greece and Denmark, a first cousin of Constantine's father.

==== Movable property ====
On 8 October 1990, the commissioner of the Royal Estate, Admiral Stavridis, submitted a request for the transfer of the family's "households goods" abroad. After secret talks with then Prime Minister Constantine Mitsotakis, the government accepted the former king's request and on 22 November, the Greek Minister for the Economy, Ioannis Palaiokrassas, and the Minister for Culture, Tzannis Tzannetakis, issued a joint ministerial decision in order to check, register and mark the objects in the collection which were probably prohibited from leaving the country. In February 1991, when the transfer process began, customs officials, an archaeologist and a representative of the National Gallery carried out the registration of the objects. This work was characterised by haste and sloppiness, and did not meet scientific standards. (Note: According to the representative of the National Gallery... "It was very cold, it was snowing and we were without heating and without electricity. We were looking at the paintings with a flashlight in our hand. Next to us was constantly a crowd of royalty, led by Admiral Stavridis, who did everything they could to make things difficult for us. They pressed us to finish quickly, when we asked to open a box they started to make a fuss.... The palace was huge and we were not allowed access to all the rooms. The paintings we forbade to leave the country were kept in a separate room. I wonder where they are now."...) Nevertheless, the list was submitted to the National Gallery in April 1992, although it has not been used for cross-checking since. On 17 February 1991, nine containers weighing 32 tonnes and containing 1904 boxes were loaded onto a ship leaving Piraeus for the port of Tilbury and the former royal residence in London. When a dock worker at the port alerted the newspapers to the transfer, it became public knowledge, and a heated debate ensued. The opposition claimed that underworld methods had been used, as Parliament had not been informed and all discussions and negotiations had taken place in secret, while public discourse questioned the legality of the transfer and assurances that it would not affect the public interest. What further discredited the operation of transferring the heirlooms was when it was revealed, 10 years later, that on 13 February 1991, while the place was under guard, a major break-in and robbery of objects of incalculable value took place. The list of stolen goods included jewellery, valuable religious icons, works of art and objects that were classified as unique works of cultural heritage and could not be legally exported. However, both the Hellenic Police and Konstantinos' entourage concealed the fact and did not take legal action to solve the theft.

In 2007, 850 valuable objects belonging to the royal estate were auctioned by Christie's in London. Constantine denied that he was the vendor - he claimed that they had already been sold in 1991 to third parties who auctioned them but journalists disputed the claim. The Greek government, through then Culture Minister Georgios Voulgarakis, tried to stop the auction, claiming that the items may have been illegally exported from Greece, but the attempt failed.

== Later life ==
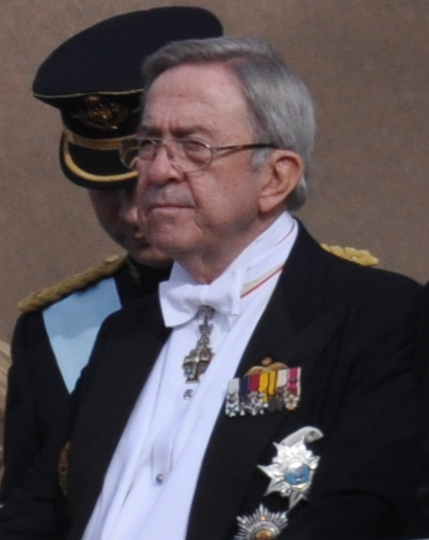
Constantine at the wedding of Victoria, Crown Princess of Sweden, and Daniel Westling, 2010

Following the abolition of the monarchy, Constantine repeatedly stated that he recognised the republic, the laws and the constitution of Greece. He told Time, "If the Greek people decide that they want a republic, they are entitled to have that and should be left in peace to enjoy it." Constantine and Anne-Marie for many years lived in Hampstead Garden Suburb, London. Constantine was a close friend of his second cousin Charles III, then Prince of Wales, and a godfather to Charles's son, Prince William. Constantine's 60th birthday lunch marked the first time that Charles and Camilla Parker Bowles were seen in public together in a relationship. In 2004, Constantine returned to Greece temporarily during the Athens Olympic Games as a member of the International Olympic Committee. Later that year, when asked whether he thought he would be the last monarch of Greece, Constantine said that it is "very hard" to determine the future. Constantine served as patron of Box Hill School, a private school in Mickleham, in the south of England until his death.

According to a nationwide 2007 survey of 2,040 households in Greece conducted on behalf of the newspaper To Vima, only 11.6% supported a constitutional monarchy. More than half of the respondents, 50.9%, considered that the dictatorship of the junta had brought benefits to Greece. During the 2008 Beijing and 2012 London Olympics, Constantine, in his role as honorary member of the International Olympic Committee, was the official presenter at the sailing medal ceremonies. He was Co-President of Honour of the International Sailing Federation, along with Harald V of Norway, from 1994 on.

In 2013, Constantine pledged in an interview with CNN that he would never become involved in restoring the monarchy. When asked by reporter Richard Quest whether he was content with never becoming the monarch again, Constantine said, "If the Greek people are happy with the system they have today, why should I be the one to change it? Just because I would like to be a king again? That would be crazy." Later that same year, Constantine returned to reside in Greece after selling his Hampstead house. From 2015 they lived in a villa in the coastal resort town of Porto Cheli in Argolis in the Peloponnese peninsula. In November 2015, his autobiography was published in three volumes by the national newspaper, To Vima. On 10 January 2022, he was admitted to the hospital after testing positive for COVID-19, which he had been fully vaccinated against.

=== Death ===
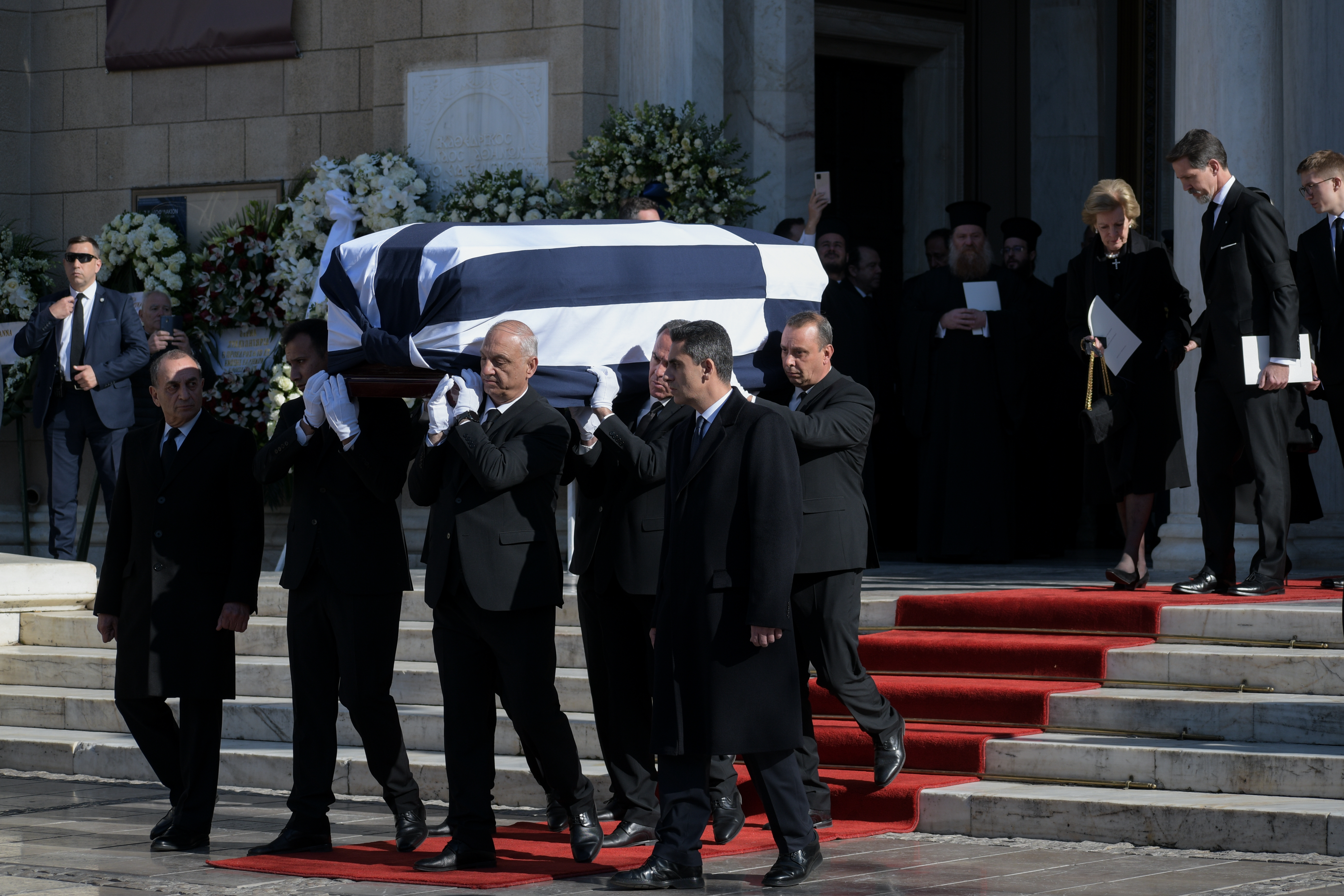
Pallbearers carrying Constantine's coffin after his funeral

Constantine suffered multiple health problems in his final years, including heart conditions and decreased mobility. On 6 January 2023, he was admitted to the intensive care unit of the private Hygeia hospital in Athens in critical condition after suffering a stroke. He died 4 days later, on 10 January 2023, at the age of 82. His death was leaked by Associated Press, but was then announced by his private office. Constantine never formally renounced his title as King of the Hellenes due to Greek Orthodox anointment tradition, which states that a monarch will never lose their status until their death.

By decision of the Greek government, and despite the wish of the family, the former monarch was not given a state funeral. The funeral took place on 16 January in the Metropolitan Cathedral of Athens in the presence of Archbishop Ieronymos II and a congregation of 200, including ten current and former European monarchs – Philippe of Belgium, Simeon II of Bulgaria, Margrethe II of Denmark, Henri of Luxembourg, Albert II of Monaco, Beatrix and Willem-Alexander of the Netherlands, Juan Carlos I and Felipe VI of Spain, and Carl XVI Gustaf of Sweden – and members of the royal houses of Baden, Hanover, Iran, Jordan, Liechtenstein, Norway, Romania, Russia, Schleswig-Holstein, Serbia, and the United Kingdom. The Greek government was officially represented by Deputy Prime Minister Panayiotis Pikrammenos and Minister of Culture Lina Mendoni who attended the ceremony. Constantine's body was buried in the Tatoi estate, next to his parents' remains the same day.

== Titles, styles and honours ==
=== Titles and styles ===
Until 1994, Constantine's official Greek passport identified him as "Constantine, Former King of the Hellenes". A law passed in 1994 stripped him of his Greek citizenship, passport and property. The law stated that Constantine could not be granted a Greek passport unless he adopted a surname. Constantine stated, "I don't have a surname — my family doesn't have a surname. The law that Mr Papandreou passed basically says that he considers that I am not Greek and that my family was Greek only so long as we were exercising the responsibilities of sovereign, and I had to go out and acquire a surname. The problem is that my family originates from Denmark, and the Danish royal family haven't got a surname." Glücksburg, he said, was not a family surname but the name of a town. He said, "I might as well call myself Mr. Kensington."

Constantine freely travelled in and out of Greece on a Danish passport, as Constantino de Grecia (Spanish for 'Constantine of Greece'), because Denmark (upon request) issues diplomatic passports to any descendants of King Christian IX and Queen Louise, and Constantine was a Prince of Denmark in his own right. During his first visit to Greece using this passport, Constantine was mocked by some of the Greek media, which hellenised the "de Grecia" designation and used it as a surname, thus naming him Greek: Κωνσταντίνος Ντεγκρέτσιας, romanised: Konstantínos Degrétsias.

The International Olympic Committee continued to refer to Constantine as His Majesty King Constantine. In Greece, he was referred to as ο τέως βασιλιάς or ο πρώην βασιλιάς ('the former king'). His official website lists his "correct form of address" as King Constantine, former King of the Hellenes.

=== National honours ===
- Greece
  - Grand Cross of the Royal Order of the Redeemer (by birth)
  - Grand Cross with Collar of the Order of Saints George and Constantine
  - Grand Cross of the Order of George I
  - Grand Cross of Order of the Phoenix
  - Medal of Military Merit 1st Class
  - Recipient of the Commemorative Badge of the Centenary of the Royal House of Greece

=== Foreign honours ===
- Denmark:
  - Knight of the Order of the Elephant
  - Grand Commander of the Order of the Dannebrog
- France: Grand Cross of the Order of the Legion of Honour
- (Pahlavi Iran) Iranian Imperial Family: Recipient of the Commemorative Medal of the 2,500 year celebration of the Persian Empire
- Italy: Knight Grand Cross with Collar of the Order of Merit of the Italian Republic
- Luxembourg: Knight of the Order of the Gold Lion of the House of Nassau
- Netherlands: Grand Cross of the Order of the House of Orange
- Norway: Grand Cross of the Order of St Olav
- Spain: 1.176th Knight of the Spanish Order of the Golden Fleece
- Sweden: Knight of the Order of the Seraphim
- United States: Commander of the Legion of Merit (4 December 1959)

==== Awards ====
- Scout Association of Japan Golden Pheasant Award (1964)
- International Sailing Federation Beppe Croce Trophy (2010)

== Issue ==
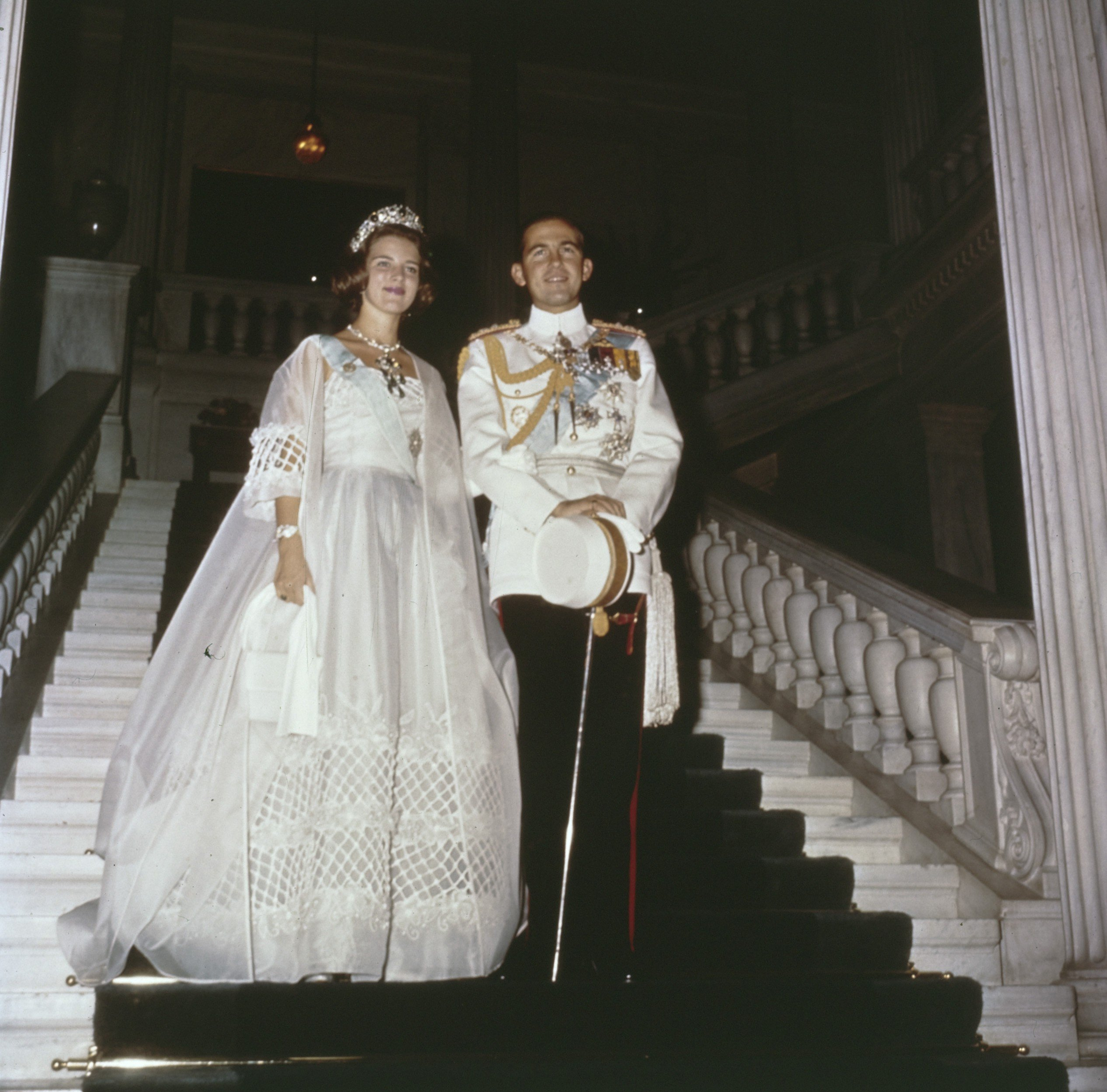
Constantine and Anne-Marie at a pre-wedding reception

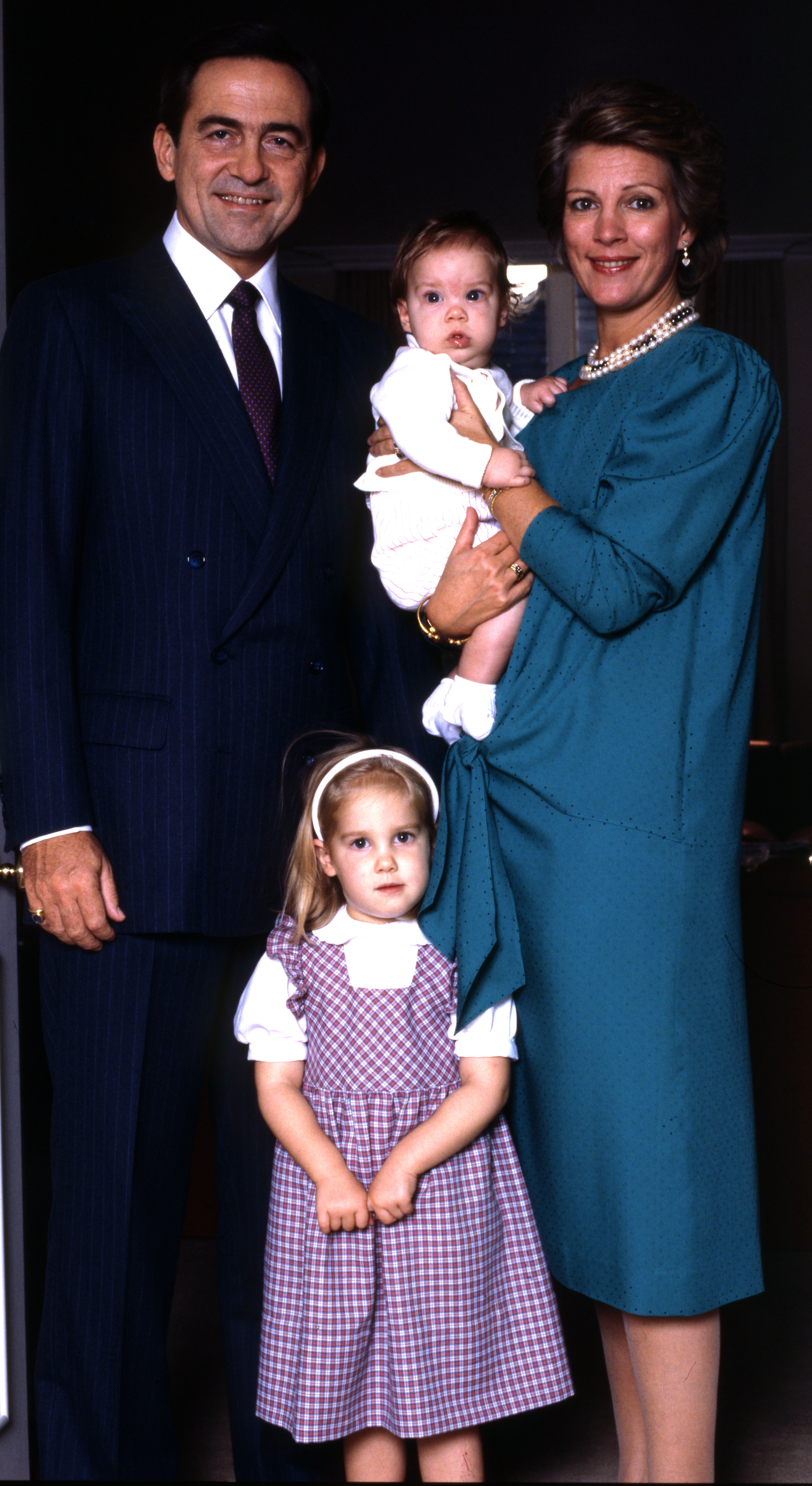
Constantine and Anne-Marie with their youngest children, Theodora and Philippos, by Allan Warren, 1987

Constantine and Anne-Marie had five children:

Name	Birth	Marriage		Children
Name	Birth	Date	Spouse	Children
Princess Alexia	10 July 1965 (age 61)	9 July 1999	Carlos Morales Quintana	Arrietta Morales y de Grecia; Anna-Maria Morales y de Grecia; Carlos Morales y de Grecia; Amelia Morales y de Grecia
Crown Prince Pavlos	20 May 1967 (age 59)	1 July 1995	Marie-Chantal Miller	Princess Maria-Olympia; Prince Constantine-Alexios; Prince Achileas-Andreas; Prince Odysseas-Kimon; Prince Aristidis-Stavros
Prince Nikolaos	1 October 1969 (age 57)	25 August 2010; Divorced 2024	Tatiana Blatnik	
Prince Nikolaos	1 October 1969 (age 57)	7 February 2025	Chrysí Vardinogianni	
Princess Theodora	9 June 1983 (age 43)	28 September 2024	Matthew Kumar	
Prince Philippos	26 April 1986 (age 40)	12 December 2020 / 23 October 2021	Nina Flohr	Prince Kimon

== See also ==
- List of Olympic medalists in sailing § Dragon class
- Round Square

== Bibliography ==
- Bertin, Celia (1982). Marie Bonaparte. Paris: Perrin. ISBN 2-262-01602-X.
- Celada, Eva (2007). Irene de Grecia: La princesa rebelde (in Spanish). Plaza & Janés. ISBN 978-84-01-30545-0.
- Dimitrakis, Panagiotis (2009). Greece and the English. British Diplomacy and the Kings of Greece. London: Tauris Academic Studies. ISBN 978-1-84511-821-1.
- Hourmouzios, Stelio (1972). No Ordinary Crown. A Biography of King Paul of the Hellenes. Weidenfeld & N. ISBN 0-297-99408-5.
- Kallivretakis, Leonidas (2017). "The King, the Junta and the "Impartial Broker": A microscopic approach to the Johnson-Constantine meeting on 11 September 1967". The Historical Review/La Revue Historique. 14: 211–240.
- Mateos Sáinz de Medrano, Ricardo (2004). La Familia de la Reina Sofía, La Dinastía griega, la Casa de Hannover y los reales primos de Europa (in Spanish). Madrid: La Esfera de los Libros. ISBN 978-8-4973-4195-0. OCLC 55595158.
- Palmer, Alan; Greece, Michael of (1990). The Royal House of Greece. London: Weidenfeld Nicolson Illustrated. ISBN 978-0-2978-3060-3.
- Tantzos, Nicholas (1990). H.M. Konstantine XIII: King of the Hellenes. Atlantic International Publications. ISBN 0-938311-12-3.
- Van der Kiste, John (1994). Kings of the Hellenes. The Greek Kings, 1863–1974. Sutton Publishing. ISBN 978-0-7509-2147-3.
- Vickers, Hugo (2000). Alice: Princess Andrew of Greece. St. Martin's Griffin. ISBN 978-0-312-30239-9.

Constantine II of Greece House of Schleswig-Holstein-Sonderburg-Glücksburg Cadet branch of the House of Oldenburg Born: 2 June 1940 Died: 10 January 2023
Regnal titles
Preceded by Paul	King of the Hellenes; 6 March 1964 – 1 June 1973	Monarchy abolished
Preceded by Paul	— TITULAR — King of the Hellenes; 1 June 1973 – 10 January 2023; Reason for succession failure: Abolition of the monarchy	Succeeded by Crown Prince Pavlos
