= Olympiacos (athletics) =

Olympiacos CFP
- Nicknames: Thrylos (The Legend); Erythrolefkoi (The Red-Whites)
- Founded: 1925
- League: SEGAS
- Based in: Piraeus, Greece
- Colours: Red, White
- President: Michalis Kountouris
- Head coach: Stella Nikolaidou
- Championships: 15 Men's Greek Open Championships; 10 Men's Greek Indoor Championships; 13 Men's Greek Cross Country Championships; 1 Women's Greek Open Championship; 1 Panhellenic Clubs Championship
- Website: olympiacossfp.gr

Olympiacos track and field department was established in 1925. The department has had in its ranks some of the greatest Greek athletes in the track and field events including Olympic medalists, as well as World, European, Mediterranean, Balkan and Greek (Panhellenic) Champions. Cases in point are: Konstantinos Kenteris, Fani Halkia, Ekaterini Thanou, Mirela Maniani, Niki Bakoyianni, Hrysopiyi Devetzi, Niki Xanthou, Dimitrios Chondrokoukis, Labros Papakostas, Periklis Iakovakis, Ekaterini Voggoli, Hristos Meletoglou, Stelios Dimotsios, Dimitrios Polymerou, Haralabos Papadias, Maria Karastamati, Flora Redoumi, Athina Papayianni, Spyridon Vasdekis, Aggeliki Tsiolakoudi, Louis Tsatoumas and Emmanouil Karalis.

== Honours ==
=== Men ===
- Greek Open Championships
  - Winners (15): 2006, 2007, 2008, 2009, 2010, 2011, 2012, 2013, 2014, 2016, 2017, 2018, 2019, 2020, 2022
- Greek Indoors Championships
  - Winners (10): 2010, 2011, 2012, 2013, 2015, 2016, 2017, 2018, 2019, 2020
- Greek Cross Country Championships
  - Winners (13): 1965, 1966, 1967, 1984, 2003, 2005, 2007, 2008, 2009, 2010, 2011, 2013

=== Women ===
- Greek Open Championships
  - Winners (1): 2010

=== Clubs championship ===
- Panhellenic Championship
  - Winners (1): 2000

== Notable athletes ==
- (Greece) Niki Bakoyianni
- (Greece) Dimitrios Chondrokoukis
- (Greece) Hrysopiyi Devetzi
- (Greece) Stelios Dimotsios
- (Greece) Fani Halkia
- (Greece) Periklis Iakovakis
- (Greece) Emmanouil Karalis
- (Greece) Maria Karastamati
- (Greece) Konstantinos Kenteris
- (Greece) Dimosthenis Magginas
- (Greece) Mirela Maniani
- (Greece) Hristos Meletoglou
- (Greece) Pantelis Nikolaidis
- (Greece) Haralabos Papadias
- (Greece) Labros Papakostas
- (Greece) Athina Papayianni
- (Greece) Panagiotis Papoulias
- (Greece) Athanasia Perra
- (Greece) Hristos Polihroniou
- (Greece) Dimitrios Polymerou
- (Greece) Flora Redoumi
- (Greece) Ekaterini Thanou
- (Greece) Louis Tsatoumas
- (Greece) Dimitrios Tsiamis
- (Greece) Aggeliki Tsiolakoudi
- (Greece) Spyridon Vasdekis
- (Greece) Ekaterini Voggoli
- (Greece) Niki Xanthou

== Notable coaches ==
- (Greece) Takis Ventikos
