= Olympiacos (sailing club) =

Greek Olympic sailing club

Olympiacos CFP
- Nicknames: Thrylos (The Legend); Erythrolefkoi (The Red-Whites)
- Founded: 1949
- Based in: Piraeus, Greece
- Colours: Red, White
- President: Michalis Kountouris
- Head coach: Giorgos Xipas
- Website: olympiacossfp.gr

Olympiacos sailing department was established in 1949 and since then has won Olympic distinctions (three gold, one silver and two bronze medals), two gold medals in World Championships as well as one gold, two silver and one bronze medal in European Championships. The sailing department successfully organized the Finn Gold Cup in Athens in 1998 and in 2002 at the club's marine training facilities in Alexandras Square, Piraeus. Olympiacos' leading athlete in the FINN Category is World Champion and five-time Olympian, Aimilios Papathanasiou.

== Honours ==
- Greek Championship Group Score
  - Winners (1): 1954

=== Men ===
- Star
  - Winners (8): 2009, 2010, 2011, 2012, 2013, 2015, 2016, 2017
- Hellenic Marine Association
  - Winners (10): 1954, 1958, 1959, 1962, 1963, 1965, 1966, 1968, 1969, 1971
- Soling
  - Winners (15): 1972, 1974, 1976, 1979, 1980, 1982, 1983, 1984, 1985, 1986, 1987, 1989, 1992, 1993, 2000
- Dragon
  - Winners (8): 1970, 1971, 1972, 1973, 1977, 1980, 1982, 1985
- 5124
  - Winners (5): 1978, 1979, 1980, 1983, 1985
- Lighting
  - Winners (11): 1969, 1970, 1971, 1973, 1974, 1978, 1979, 1982, 1983, 1986, 1987, 1989
- Tornado
  - Winners (6): 1977, 1979, 1981, 1983, 1985, 1988
- Flying Dutchmann
  - Winners (4): 1968, 1972, 1974, 1980
- Lechner Α390
  - Winners (3): 1989, 1991, 1992
- Laser Radial
  - Winners (5): 1982, 1984, 1986, 1987, 1990
- Laser
  - Winners (7): 1973, 1975, 1976, 1978, 1980, 1981, 1986
- Finn
  - Winners (27): 1958, 1961, 1962, 1965, 1968, 1972, 1973, 1974, 1976, 1977, 1978, 1979, 1980, 1982, 1996, 1997, 1998, 1999, 2000, 2001, 2002, 2003, 2004, 2005, 2006, 2007, 2008
