= Olympiacos (swimming club) =

Greek swimming club

Olympiacos CFP
- Nicknames: Thrylos (The Legend); Erythrolefkoi (The Red-Whites)
- Founded: 1925
- Based in: Piraeus, Greece
- Colours: Red, White
- President: Michalis Kountouris
- Head coach: Nikos Gemelos
- Championships: 67 Greek League Championships OPEN; 10 Greek Open Water Championships; 4 Greek Cups (25m pool); 1 Greek Super Cup; 1 Panhellenic Masters Championship; 1 Panhellenic Masters Open Water Championship
- Website: olympiacossfp.gr

Olympiacos swimming club is the swimming department of the major Greek multi-sport club, Olympiacos CFP, based in Piraeus, Greece. The department was founded in 1925, being one of the founding members of the Hellenic Swimming Federation.

Olympiacos is the most successful team in the history of Greek swimming, having won a record 67 Greek Championships, 10 Greek Open Water Championships, 4 Greek Cups (25m pool), 1 Greek Super Cup, 1 Panhellenic Masters Championship and 1 Panhellenic Masters Open Water Championship. The club's dominating success can be further evidenced by the fact that all other Greek swimming clubs have won a combined total of 34 Greek League titles. Olympiacos also hold the record for the most consecutive Greek League titles won, with thirty-one (31) in a row (1996–2026), which is a record in Greek sports history. Olympiakos swimming department holds the world record of having won at least one title in every season, for fifty-eight (58) consecutive years (1969-2026). Since 1997, the department is led by head coach Nikos Gemelos, who has coached Olympiacos to 30 consecutive Greek League titles.

Olympiacos has produced some of the greatest swimmers in Greek swimming history, such as the Olympic silver medalist, five-time Olympian, two-time World Champion, World Cup gold medalist, and two-time European Champion Spyros Gianniotis, who is considered the greatest Greek swimmer of all time.

== Honours ==
=== Greek competitions ===
- Greek Championship (Club)
  - Winners (67): 1929, 1930, 1931, 1932, 1933, 1934, 1937, 1960, 1961, 1962, 1967, 1969, 1970, 1971, 1972, 1973, 1974, 1975, 1976, 1977, 1978, 1979, 1980, 1981, 1982, 1983, 1984, 1985, 1986, 1988, 1989, 1990, 1991, 1992, 1993, 1994, 1996, 1997, 1998, 1999, 2000, 2001, 2002, 2003, 2004, 2005, 2006, 2007, 2008, 2009, 2010, 2011, 2012, 2013, 2014, 2015, 2016, 2017, 2018, 2026
- Greek Championship (Men's)
  - Winners (61): 1931, 1932, 1933, 1934, 1935, 1937, 1962, 1964, 1967, 1969, 1970, 1971, 1972, 1973, 1974, 1975, 1976, 1977, 1978, 1979, 1980, 1981, 1985, 1986, 1987, 1988, 1989, 1990, 1993, 1994, 1995, 1996, 1997, 1998, 1999, 2000, 2001, 2002, 2003, 2004, 2005, 2006, 2007, 2008, 2009, 2011, 2012, 2013, 2014, 2015, 2016, 2017, 2018, 2019, 2020, 2021, 2022, 2023, 2024, 2025, 2026
- Greek Championship (Women's)
  - Winners (56): 1928, 1929, 1930, 1931, 1932, 1933, 1934, 1936, 1937, 1967, 1970, 1971, 1972, 1973, 1974, 1975, 1979, 1980, 1981, 1982, 1983, 1984, 1985, 1989, 1990, 1991, 1992, 1993, 1996, 1997, 1998, 2001, 2002, 2003, 2004, 2005, 2006, 2007, 2008, 2009, 2010, 2011, 2012, 2013, 2014, 2015, 2016, 2017, 2018, 2019, 2020, 2021, 2022, 2023, 2024, 2025
- Greek Cup (25m pool)
  - Winners (4): 1997, 1998, 1999, 2001
- Greek Open Water Championship (Club)
  - Winners (10): 2010, 2015, 2016, 2017, 2018, 2019, 2020, 2021, 2022, 2023
- Greek Open Water Championship (Men's)
  - Winners (9): 2010, 2015, 2016, 2017, 2018, 2019, 2020, 2021, 2022
- Greek Open Water Championship (Women's)
  - Winners (11): 2010, 2015, 2016, 2017, 2018, 2019, 2020, 2021, 2022, 2023, 2024
- Greek Super Cup
  - Winners (1): 2015
- Panhellenic Masters Championship
  - Winners (1): 2017
- Panhellenic Masters Open Water Championship
  - Winners (1): 2017

=== Winter Swimming ===
- Winter Greek League Championship
  - Winners (33): 1980, 1981, 1982, 1983, 1984, 1985, 1986, 1988, 1989, 1990, 1991, 1993, 1994, 1995, 1996, 1997, 1998, 2001, 2002, 2003, 2004, 2005, 2006, 2007, 2008, 2009, 2011, 2013, 2014, 2015, 2016, 2017, 2018
- Winter Greek Christmas Cup
  - Winners (20): 1992, 1994, 1995, 1996, 1997, 1998, 1999, 2001, 2002, 2003, 2005, 2006, 2007, 2008, 2013, 2014, 2015, 2016, 2017, 2018

=== Regional ===
- Greek Championship (South Greece)
  - Winners (6): 1931, 1932, 1933, 1934, 1935, 1939
- Greek Championship (Center)
  - Winners (4): 1961, 1966, 1967, 1968
- Club Greek Championship (Center)
  - Winners (1): 1961

=== Other ===
- Special Panhellenic Swimming Cup
  - Winners (1): 1967

=== Youth Department ===
- International Meeting
  - Winners (3): 1970, 1972, 1973
  - Runners-up (1): 1971

== European Honours ==
year	honour	notes
European Champions Clubs Cup
1987	9th place	
1988	9th place	

== Notable swimmers ==
- (Greece) Spyros Gianniotis
- (Greece) Apostolos Christou

== Notable coaches ==
- (Greece) Nikos Gemelos
