= Boccia at the 2012 Summer Paralympics – Individual BC3 =

Boccia – Individual BC3 at the XIV Paralympic Games
- Venue: ExCeL London
- Dates: 5 September 2012 – 8 September 2012
- Competitors: 24 from 14 nations

Medalists
1st place, gold medalist(s)		Choi Ye-jin	South Korea
2nd place, silver medalist(s)		Jeong Ho-won	South Korea
3rd place, bronze medalist(s)		José Macedo	Portugal

The individual BC3 boccia event at the 2012 Summer Paralympics is being contested from 5 to 8 September at ExCeL London.

== Seeding matches ==
Three preliminary matches were held to determine the participants' seed for the tournament bracket.

Match 53
1	Nurul Binte Mohammad Taha (SIN)	4
2	Johnny Cronin (IRL)	6

Match 54
1	Daniele Martins (BRA)	6
2	Christoffer Hagdahl (SWE)	2

Match 55
1	Keita Kato (JPN)	1
2	Austin Hanson (USA)	6

== Draw ==
=== Finals ===
Semifinals
Jeong Ho-won (KOR)	2*
José Macedo (POR)	2
Choi Ye-jin (KOR)	8
Kim Han-soo (KOR)	0

Gold medal match
Jeong Ho-won (KOR)	3
Choi Ye-jin (KOR)	4
Bronze medal match
José Macedo (POR)	3
Kim Han-soo (KOR)	2

=== 5th–8th place matches ===
Semifinals
Armando Costa (POR)	1
Grigorios Polychronidis (GRE)	4
Kirsten de Laender (BEL)	5
Nurul Binte Mohammad Taha (SIN)	2

5th–6th place match
Grigorios Polychronidis (GRE)	3*
Kirsten de Laender (BEL)	3
7th–8th place match
Armando Costa (POR)	2
Nurul Binte Mohammad Taha (SIN)	2*

=== Top half ===
First round
Scott McCowan (GBR)	11
José Rodríguez Vázquez (ESP)	0
Daniele Martins (BRA)	7
Tanimpat Visaratanunta (THA)	2
Christoffer Hagdahl (SWE)	2
Sandra Pena Cortes (ESP)	3
Paul Gauthier (CAN)	7
Austin Hanson (USA)	1

Second round
Jeong Ho-won (KOR)	6
Scott McCowan (GBR)	1
Daniele Martins (BRA)	1
Armando Costa (POR)	11
Kirsten de Laender (BEL)	8
Sandra Pena Cortes (ESP)	2
Paul Gauthier (CAN)	5
José Macedo (POR)	7

Quarterfinals
Jeong Ho-won (KOR)	5
Armando Costa (POR)	1
Kirsten de Laender (BEL)	1
José Macedo (POR)	4

Semifinals
Jeong Ho-won (KOR)	2
José Macedo (POR)	2

=== Bottom half ===
First round
Veronica Pamies Morera (ESP)	1
Jacob Thomas (GBR)	8
Choi Ye-jin (KOR)	10
Nikolaos Pananos (GRE)	0
Monica Martino (CAN)	2
Nurul Binte Mohammad Taha (SIN)	5
Pieter Cilissen (BEL)	5
Keita Kato (JPN)	1

Second round
Grigorios Polychronidis (GRE)	5
Jacob Thomas (GBR)	1
Choi Ye-jin (KOR)	10
Luis Silva (POR)	1
Johnny Cronin (IRL)	1
Nurul Binte Mohammad Taha (SIN)	7
Pieter Cilissen (BEL)	2
Kim Han-soo (KOR)	5

Quarterfinals
Grigorios Polychronidis (GRE)	2
Choi Ye-jin (KOR)	7
Nurul Binte Mohammad Taha (SIN)	3
Kim Han-soo (KOR)	3*

Semifinals
Choi Ye-jin (KOR)	8
Kim Han-soo (KOR)	0

== Final ranking ==
1st place, gold medalist(s)	Choi Ye-jin (KOR)
2nd place, silver medalist(s)	Jeong Ho-won (KOR)
3rd place, bronze medalist(s)	José Macedo (POR)
4	Kim Han-soo (KOR)
5	Grigorios Polychronidis (GRE)
6	Kirsten de Laender (BEL)
7	Nurul Binte Mohammad Taha (SIN)
8	Armando Costa (POR)
