= Boccia at the 2020 Summer Paralympics – Mixed individual BC3 =

Boccia at the XVI Paralympic Games
- Venue: Ariake Gymnastics Centre
- Dates: 28 August - 4 September
- Competitors: 24 from 14 nations

Medalists
| 1st place, gold medalist(s) | | Adam Peška | Czech Republic |
| 2nd place, silver medalist(s) | | Grigorios Polychronidis | Greece |
| 3rd place, bronze medalist(s) | | Daniel Michel | Australia |

The mixed individual BC3 boccia event at the 2020 Summer Paralympics is taking place between 28 August to 4 September at Ariake Gymnastics Centre in Tokyo. 24 competitors took part.

== Final stage ==
The knockout stage will be played between 30 August to 1 September.

Quarter-finals
Grigorios Polychronidis (GRE) | 5
Aleksandr Legostaev (RPC) | 1
Evelyn de Oliveira (BRA) | 1
Scott McCowan (GBR) | 9
Hansoo Kim (KOR) | 0
Daniel Michel (AUS) | 8
Howon Jeong (KOR) | 3
Adam Peška (CZE) | 7

Semi-finals
Grigorios Polychronidis (GRE) | 4*
Scott McCowan (GBR) | 4
Daniel Michel (AUS) | 3
Adam Peška (CZE) | 4

Finals
Grigorios Polychronidis (GRE) | 3
Adam Peška (CZE) | 3*
Third place match
Scott McCowan (GBR) | 1
Daniel Michel (AUS) | 6

== Pool stages ==
=== Pool A ===
Boccia at the 2020 Summer Paralympics - Individual BC3 Pool A
| Pos | Player | Pld | W | L | PF | PA | PD | H2H | Player | (Greece) | (Japan) | (Portugal) | (Portugal) |
|---|---|---|---|---|---|---|---|---|---|---|---|---|---|
| 1 Q | G. Polychronidis (GRE) | 3 | 3 | 0 | 20 | 5 | +15 | H2H | (Greece) | | 7-2 | 4-3 | 9-0 |
| 2 | Kazuki Takahashi (JPN) | 3 | 2 | 1 | 14 | 9 | +5 | H2H | (Japan) | 2-7 | | 9-0 | 3-2 |
| 3 | Avelino Andrade (POR) | 3 | 1 | 2 | 9 | 13 | -4 | H2H | (Portugal) | 3-4 | 0-9 | | 6-0 |
| 4 | Ana Costa (POR) | 3 | 0 | 3 | 2 | 18 | −16 | H2H | (Portugal) | 0-9 | 2-3 | 0-6 | |

=== Pool B ===
Boccia at the 2020 Summer Paralympics - Individual BC3 Pool B
| Pos | Player | Pld | W | L | PF | PA | PD | H2H | Player | (South Korea) | (Hong Kong) | (Portugal) | (Brazil) |
|---|---|---|---|---|---|---|---|---|---|---|---|---|---|
| 1 Q | Hansoo Kim (KOR) | 3 | 2 | 1 | 13 | 6 | +7 | H2H | (South Korea) | | 4-2 | 3-4 | 6-0 |
| 2 | Ho Yuen Kei (HKG) | 3 | 2 | 1 | 13 | 6 | +7 | H2H | (Hong Kong) | 2-4 | | 3-1 | 8-1 |
| 3 | Jose Macedo (POR) | 3 | 2 | 1 | 9 | 9 | 0 | H2H | (Portugal) | 4-3 | 1-3 | | 4-3 |
| 4 | E. Calado (BRA) | 3 | 0 | 3 | 4 | 18 | -14 | H2H | (Brazil) | 0-6 | 1-8 | 3-4 | |

=== Pool C ===
Boccia at the 2020 Summer Paralympics - Individual BC3 Pool C
| Pos | Player | Pld | W | L | PF | PA | PD | H2H | Player | (South Korea) | (Hong Kong) | (Japan) | (Brazil) |
|---|---|---|---|---|---|---|---|---|---|---|---|---|---|
| 1 Q | Howon Jeong (KOR) | 3 | 3 | 0 | 16 | 7 | +9 | H2H | (South Korea) | | 8-1 | 5*-5 | 3-1 |
| 2 | Tse Tak Wah (HKG) | 3 | 2 | 1 | 7 | 13 | -6 | H2H | (Hong Kong) | 1-8 | | 3-2 | 3*-3 |
| 3 | K. Kawamoto (JPN) | 3 | 1 | 2 | 11 | 10 | +1 | H2H | (Japan) | 5-5* | 2-3 | | 4-2 |
| 4 | Mateus Carvalho (BRA) | 3 | 0 | 3 | 6 | 10 | -4 | H2H | (Brazil) | 1-3 | 3-3* | 2-4 | |

=== Pool D ===
Boccia at the 2020 Summer Paralympics - Individual BC3 Pool D
| Pos | Player | Pld | W | L | PF | PA | PD | H2H | Player | (Brazil) | (Australia) | (Sweden) | (Thailand) |
|---|---|---|---|---|---|---|---|---|---|---|---|---|---|
| 1 Q | E. de Oliveira (BRA) | 3 | 3 | 0 | 15 | 5 | +10 | H2H | (Brazil) | | 3-2 | 4-2 | 8-1 |
| 2 Q | Daniel Michel (AUS) | 3 | 2 | 1 | 19 | 5 | +14 | H2H | (Australia) | 2-3 | | 8-2 | 9-0 |
| 3 | Maria Bjurstrom (SWE) | 3 | 1 | 2 | 11 | 12 | -1 | H2H | (Sweden) | 2-4 | 2-8 | | 7-0 |
| 4 | S. Chaipanich (THA) | 3 | 0 | 3 | 1 | 24 | −23 | H2H | (Thailand) | 1-8 | 0-9 | 0-7 | |

=== Pool E ===
Boccia at the 2020 Summer Paralympics - Individual BC3 Pool E
| Pos | Player | Pld | W | L | PF | PA | PD | H2H | Player | (United Kingdom) | (Australia) | (Argentina) | (United Kingdom) |
|---|---|---|---|---|---|---|---|---|---|---|---|---|---|
| 1 Q | Scott McCowan (GBR) | 3 | 3 | 0 | 17 | 5 | +12 | H2H | (United Kingdom) | | 4-3 | 7-1 | 6-1 |
| 2 | Spencer Cotie (AUS) | 3 | 2 | 1 | 12 | 7 | +5 | H2H | (Australia) | 3-4 | | 4-1 | 5-2 |
| 3 | S. Ferrando (ARG) | 3 | 1 | 2 | 4 | 12 | -8 | H2H | (Argentina) | 1-6 | 1-4 | | 2*-2 |
| 4 | Jamie McCowan (GBR) | 3 | 0 | 3 | 5 | 14 | −9 | H2H | (United Kingdom) | 1-7 | 2-5 | 2-2* | |

=== Pool F ===
Boccia at the 2020 Summer Paralympics - Individual BC3 Pool F
| Pos | Player | Pld | W | L | PF | PA | PD | H2H | Player | (Czech Republic) | RPC | (France) | (Greece) |
|---|---|---|---|---|---|---|---|---|---|---|---|---|---|
| 1 Q | Adam Peška (CZE) | 3 | 3 | 0 | 11 | 5 | +6 | H2H | (Czech Republic) | | 3*-3 | 5-0 | 3-2 |
| 2 Q | A. Legostaev (RPC) | 3 | 2 | 1 | 15 | 8 | +7 | H2H | RPC | 3-3* | | 4-3 | 8-2 |
| 3 | S. Beken (FRA) | 3 | 1 | 2 | 7 | 11 | -4 | H2H | (France) | 0-5 | 3-4 | | 4-2 |
| 4 | Anna Ntenta (GRE) | 3 | 0 | 3 | 6 | 15 | −9 | H2H | (Greece) | 2-3 | 2-8 | 2-4 | |
