= Boccia at the 2024 Summer Paralympics – Pairs BC3 =

Event at the 2024 Summer Paralympics

Boccia – Mixed pairs BC3 at the XVII Paralympic Games
- Venue: South Paris Arena
- Date: 2–4 September 2024
- Competitors: 24 from 12 nations

Medalists
1st place, gold medalist(s)		Yuen Kei Ho; Tak Wah Tse	Hong Kong
2nd place, silver medalist(s)		Jeong Ho-won; Kang Sun-hee	South Korea
3rd place, bronze medalist(s)		Stefanía Ferrando; Rodrigo Romero	Argentina

The mixed pairs BC3 boccia event at the 2024 Summer Paralympics will be contested between 2 and 4 September 2024 at the South Paris Arena. Since this event is a mixed event, both genders, male and female, compete in the event.

The competition starts with a pools stage, containing 4 pools with 3 teams each, followed by an eight-team elimination stage.

== Rosters ==
Each team contains two athletes. All team have a male (M) and female (F) athlete.

Team	Athletes	Team	Athletes	Team	Athletes
Argentina	Stefanía Ferrando; Rodrigo Romero	Australia	Jamieson Leeson; Daniel Michel	Brazil	Mateus Carvalho; Evelyn Oliveira
Czechia	Marcela Cermakova; Adam Peska	France	Sonia Heckel; Jules Menard	Great Britain	Will Arnott; Sally Kidson
Greece	Anna Ntenta; Grigorios Polychronidis	Hong Kong, China	Yuen Kei Ho; Tak Wah Tse	Japan	Masayuki Arita; Ayane Ichinoe
South Korea	Jeong Ho-won; Kang Sun-hee	South Africa	Elanza Jordaan; Karabo Morapedi	Thailand	Akkadej Choochuenklin; Ladamanee Kla-Han

== Classification ==
The BC3 classification is described as follows:

BC3M/F – Players in this class have very severe locomotor dysfunction in all four extremities. Players in this class have no sustained grasp or release action and although they may have arm movement, they have insufficient range of movement to propel a boccia ball onto the court. They may use an assistive device such as a ramp to deliver the ball. They may compete using an assistant; assistants must keep their back to the court and their eyes averted from play.

== Results ==
=== Pools ===
The pool stage will be played between 3 and 4 September where the top 2 teams in each pool will qualify for the quarterfinals.

Pool A

Pos	Player	Pld	W	D	L	PF	PA	PD	Pts	Qualification	(Australia)	(France)	(Japan)
1	Australia	2	2	0	0	10	4	+6	4	Qualification for quarterfinal	—	5–2	5–2
2	France	2	1	0	1	5	8	−3	2	Qualification for quarterfinal	2–5	—	3*-3
3	Japan	2	0	0	2	5	8	−3	0	Eliminated	2–5	3–3*	—

Updated to match(es) played on 27 August 2024. Source: team---bc1-2 Paris 2024

Pool B

Pos	Player	Pld	W	D	L	PF	PA	PD	Pts	Qualification	(Thailand)	(South Korea)	(United Kingdom)
1	Thailand	2	2	0	0	12	2	+10	4	Qualification for quarterfinal	—	5–2	7–0
2	South Korea	2	1	0	1	8	7	+1	2	Qualification for quarterfinal	2–5	—	6–2
3	Great Britain	2	0	0	2	2	13	−11	0	Eliminated	0–7	2–6	—

Updated to match(es) played on 27 August 2024. Source: Paris 2024

Pool C

Pos	Player	Pld	W	D	L	PF	PA	PD	Pts	Qualification	(Hong Kong)	(Argentina)	(Czech Republic)
1	Hong Kong	2	2	0	0	10	5	+5	4	Qualification for quarterfinal	—	3–2	7–2
2	Argentina	2	1	0	1	9	5	+4	2	Qualification for quarterfinal	2–3	—	7–2
3	Czech Republic	2	0	0	2	2	14	−12	0	Eliminated	2–7	2–7	—

Updated to match(es) played on 27 August 2024. Source: Paris 2024

Pool D

Pos	Player	Pld	W	D	L	PF	PA	PD	Pts	Qualification	(Greece)	(Brazil)	(South Africa)
1	Greece	2	2	0	0	14	1	+13	4	Qualification for quarterfinal	—	4–1	10–0
2	Brazil	2	1	0	1	8	4	+4	2	Qualification for quarterfinal	1–4	—	7–0
3	South Africa	2	0	0	2	0	17	−17	0	Eliminated	0–10	0–7	—

Updated to match(es) played on 27 August 2024. Source: Paris 2024

=== Elimination stage ===
The final stage (or knockout stage) will be played between 4 and 5 September

Quarter-finals
4 September, South Paris Arena
Australia	2
South Korea	4
4 September, South Paris Arena
Greece	4
Argentina	5
4 September, South Paris Arena
Thailand	6
France	1
4 September, South Paris Arena
Hong Kong	3
Brazil	1

Semi-finals
4 September, South Paris Arena
South Korea	4
Argentina	2
4 September, South Paris Arena
Thailand	2
Hong Kong	3

Final
5 September, South Paris Arena
South Korea	3
Hong Kong	5
Bronze medal
5 September, South Paris Arena
Argentina	4
Thailand	2

Elimination Matches

Quarterfinals

Match QF1:
Player/End	1	2	3	4	Result	Report
Australia	0	1	1	0	2	Report
South Korea;	2	0	0	2	4	Report
Match QF2:
Player/End	1	2	3	4	Result	Report
Greece	1	0	0	3	4	Report
Argentina	0	4	1	0	5	Report
Match QF3:
Player/End	1	2	3	4	Result	Report
Hong Kong	0	1	1	1	3	Report
Brazil	1	0	0	0	1	Report
Match QF4:
Player/End	1	2	3	4	Result	Report
France	0	0	0	1	1	Report
Thailand	1	2	3	0	6	Report

Semifinals

Match SF1:
Player/End	1	2	3	4	Result	Report
South Korea	3	0	1	0	4	Report
Argentina	0	1	0	1	2	Report
Match SF2:
Player/End	1	2	3	4	Result	Report
Thailand	1	0	0	1	2	Report
Hong Kong	0	2	1	0	3	Report

Finals

Bronze medal match:
Player/End	1	2	3	4	Result	Report
Argentina	0	2	1	1	4	Report
Thailand	2	0	0	0	2	Report
Gold medal match:
Player/End	1	2	3	4	Result	Report
Hong Kong	3	0	1	1	5	Report
South Korea	0	3	0	0	3	Report
