= Boccia at the 2012 Summer Paralympics – Pairs BC3 =

Boccia – Pairs BC3 at the XIV Paralympic Games
- Venue: ExCeL London
- Dates: 2 September 2012 – 4 September 2012
- Teams: 8

Medalists
| 1st place, gold medalist(s) | | Maria-Eleni Kordali; Nikolaos Pananos; Grigorios Polychronidis | Greece |
| 2nd place, silver medalist(s) | | Armando Costa; José Macedo; Luis Silva | Portugal |
| 3rd place, bronze medalist(s) | | Pieter Cilissen; Kirsten de Laender; Pieter Verlinden | Belgium |

The mixed pairs BC3 boccia event at the 2012 Summer Paralympics was contested from 2 to 4 September at ExCeL London.

== Group stage ==
=== Group A ===
| Team | Pld | W | L | PF | PA | PD |
|---|---|---|---|---|---|---|
| Ye-Jin Choi / Ho-Won Jeong / Kim Han-soo (KOR) | 3 | 2 | 1 | 21 | 7 | 14 |
| Maria-Eleni Kordali / Nikolaos Pananos / Grigorios Polychronidis (GRE) | 3 | 2 | 1 | 8 | 13 | -5 |
| Jessica Hunter / Scott McCowan / Jacob Thomas (GBR) | 3 | 1 | 2 | 11 | 12 | -1 |
| Bruno Garneau / Paul Gauthier / Monica Martino (CAN) | 3 | 1 | 2 | 8 | 16 | -8 |

=== Group B ===
| Team | Pld | W | L | PF | PA | PD |
|---|---|---|---|---|---|---|
| Pieter Cilissen / Kirsten de Laender / Pieter Verlinden (BEL) | 3 | 3 | 0 | 22 | 4 | 18 |
| Armando Costa / José Macedo / Luis Silva (POR) | 3 | 2 | 1 | 14 | 4 | 10 |
| Somboon Chaipanich / Tanimpat Visaratanunta (THA) | 3 | 1 | 2 | 11 | 12 | -1 |
| Veronica Pamies Morera / Sandra Pena Cortes / Jose Rodriguez Vazquez (ESP) | 3 | 0 | 3 | 1 | 28 | -27 |

== Knockout stage ==
Semifinals
A1 | South Korea (KOR) | 3
B2 | Portugal (POR) | 4
B1 | Belgium (BEL) | 0
A2 | Greece (GRE) | 7

Gold medal match
B2 | Portugal (POR) | 1
A2 | Greece (GRE) | 4
Bronze medal match
A1 | South Korea (KOR) | 3
B1 | Belgium (BEL) | 4
