= Boccia at the 2024 Summer Paralympics – Women's individual BC3 =

Boccia – Women's individual BC3 at the XVII Paralympic Games
- Venue: South Paris Arena
- Date: 29 August - 2 September 2024
- Competitors: 16 from 15 nations

Medalists
1st place, gold medalist(s)		Ho Yuen Kei	Hong Kong
2nd place, silver medalist(s)		Jamieson Leeson	Australia
3rd place, bronze medalist(s)		Kang Sun-hee	South Korea

The women's individual BC3 boccia event at the 2024 Summer Paralympics will be contested between 29 August and 2 September 2024 at the South Paris Arena.

The event structure begins with pool stages. The top two players from each of four pools then enter into the single-elimination stage, with the losing semifinalists playing off for bronze.

== Classification ==
The BC3 classification is described as follows:

BC3M/F – Players in this class have very severe locomotor dysfunction in all four extremities. Players in this class have no sustained grasp or release action and although they may have arm movement, they have insufficient range of movement to propel a boccia ball onto the court. They may use an assistive device such as a ramp to deliver the ball. They may compete using an assistant; assistants must keep their back to the court and their eyes averted from play.

== Results ==
=== Pool stages ===
The pool stage will be played between 29 and 31 August 2024. The top two players in each pool will qualify to the elimination rounds.

==== Pool A ====
Pos	Player	Pld	W	D	L	PF	PA	PD	Pts	Qualification	(Poland)	(Thailand)	(France)	(Czech Republic)
1	Edyta Owczarz (POL)	3	3	0	0	18	8	+10	6	Qualification for quarterfinal	—	3–2	9–2	6–4
2	Ladamanee Kla-Han (THA)	3	2	0	1	15	4	+11	4	Qualification for quarterfinal	2–3	—	4–1	9–0
3	Sonia Heckel (FRA)	3	1	0	2	9	14	−5	2	Eliminated	2–9	1–4	—	6–1
4	Marcela Cermakova (CZE)	2	0	0	2	1	15	−14	0	Eliminated	4–6	0–9	1–6	—

Updated to match(es) played on 31 August 2024. Source: Paris 2024

Pool A boxscores

Match 1:
Player/End	1	2	3	4	Result	Report
Sonia Heckel (FRA)	1	0	0	0	1	Report
Ladamanee Kla-Han (THA)	0	1	1	2	4	Report
Match 2:
Player/End	1	2	3	4	Result	Report
Edyta Owczarz (POL)	0	1	5	0	6	Report
Marcela Cermakova (CZE)	1	0	0	3	4	Report
Match 3:
Player/End	1	2	3	4	Result	Report
Marcela Cermakova (CZE)	1	0	0	0	1	Report
Sonia Heckel (FRA)	0	3	2	1	6	Report
Match 4:
Player/End	1	2	3	4	Result	Report
Edyta Owczarz (POL)	2	0	0	1	3	Report
Ladamanee Kla-Han (THA)	0	1	1	0	2	Report
Match 5:
Player/End	1	2	3	4	Result	Report
Sonia Heckel (FRA)	2	0	0	0	2	Report
Edyta Owczarz (POL)	0	1	4	4	9	Report
Match 6:
Player/End	1	2	3	4	Result	Report
Ladamanee Kla-Han (THA)	1	3	2	3	9	Report
Marcela Cermakova (CZE)	0	0	0	0	0	Report

==== Pool B ====
Pos	Player	Pld	W	D	L	PF	PA	PD	Pts	Qualification	(Hong Kong)	(Brazil)	(Portugal)	(South Africa)
1	Ho Yuen Kei (HKG)	3	3	0	0	16	6	+10	6	Qualification for quarterfinal	—	5–4	3–2	8–0
2	Evani Calado (BRA)	3	2	0	1	12	7	+5	4	Qualification for quarterfinal	4–5	—	8–2	5–0
3	Ana Costa (POR)	3	1	0	2	8	13	−5	2	Eliminated	2–3	2–8	—	4–2
4	Elanza Jordaan (RSA)	3	0	0	3	2	17	−15	0	Eliminated	0–8	0–5	2–4	—

Updated to match(es) played on 31 August 2024. Source: Paris 2024

Pool B boxscores

Match 1:
Player/End	1	2	3	4	Result	Report
Ho Yuen Kei (HKG)	1	2	0	0	3	Report
Ana Costa (POR)	0	0	1	1	2	Report
Match 2:
Player/End	1	2	3	4	Result	Report
Evani Calado (BRA)	1	1	1	2	5	Report
Elanza Jordaan (RSA)	0	0	0	0	0	Report
Match 3:
Player/End	1	2	3	4	Result	Report
Elanza Jordaan (RSA)	0	0	0	0	0	Report
Ho Yuen Kei (HKG)	1	1	4	2	8	Report
Match 4:
Player/End	1	2	3	4	Result	Report
Evani Calado (BRA)	3	0	3	2	8	Report
Ana Costa (POR)	0	2	0	0	2	Report
Match 5:
Player/End	1	2	3	4	Result	Report
Ho Yuen Kei (HKG)	4	0	0	1	5	Report
Evani Calado (BRA)	0	1	3	0	4	Report
Match 6:
Player/End	1	2	3	4	Result	Report
Ana Costa (POR)	1	0	3	0	4	Report
Elanza Jordaan (RSA)	0	1	0	1	2	Report

==== Pool C ====
Pos	Player	Pld	W	D	L	PF	PA	PD	Pts	Qualification	(South Korea)	(Australia)	(United Kingdom)	(Brazil)
1	Kang Sunhee (KOR)	3	3	0	0	20	1	+19	6	Qualification for quarterfinal	—	6–1	7–0	7–0
2	Jamieson Leeson (AUS)	3	2	0	1	11	10	+1	4	Qualification for quarterfinal	1–6	—	6–1	4–3
3	Sally Kidson (GBR)	3	1	0	2	6	14	−8	2	Eliminated	0–7	1–6	—	5–1
4	Evelyn Oliveira (BRA)	3	0	0	3	4	16	−12	0	Eliminated	0–7	3–4	1–5	—

Updated to match(es) played on 31 August 2024. Source: Paris 2024

Pool C boxscores

Match 1:
Player/End	1	2	3	4	Result	Report
Evelyn Oliveira (BRA)	2	0	1	0	3	Report
Jamieson Leeson (AUS)	0	1	0	3	4	Report
Match 2:
Player/End	1	2	3	4	Result	Report
Kang Sunhee (KOR)	1	2	2	2	7	Report
Sally Kidson (GBR)	0	0	0	0	0	Report
Match 3:
Player/End	1	2	3	4	Result	Report
Sally Kidson (GBR)	1	1	0	3	5	Report
Evelyn Oliveira (BRA)	0	0	1	0	1	Report
Match 4:
Player/End	1	2	3	4	Result	Report
Kang Sunhee (KOR)	1	0	3	2	6	Report
Jamieson Leeson (AUS)	0	1	0	0	1	Report
Match 5:
Player/End	1	2	3	4	Result	Report
Evelyn Oliveira (BRA)	0	0	0	0	0	Report
Kang Sunhee (KOR)	1	1	1	4	7	Report
Match 6:
Player/End	1	2	3	4	Result	Report
Jamieson Leeson (AUS)	0	2	3	1	6	Report
Sally Kidson (GBR)	1	0	0	0	1	Report

==== Pool D ====
Pos	Player	Pld	W	D	L	PF	PA	PD	Pts	Qualification	(Argentina)	(Japan)	(Greece)	(Peru)
1	Stefania Ferrando (ARG) (Q)	3	3	0	0	17	7	+10	6	Qualification for quarterfinal	—	6–3	8–2	3–2
2	Ayane Ichinoe (JPN) (Q)	3	2	0	1	16	7	+9	4	Qualification for quarterfinal	3–6	—	8–0	5–1
3	Anna Ntenta (GRE)	3	1	0	2	7	20	−13	2	Eliminated	2–8	0–8	—	5–4
4	Niurka Callupe (PER)	3	0	0	3	7	13	−6	0	Eliminated	2–3	1–5	4–5	—

Updated to match(es) played on 29 August 2024. Source: Paris 2024

Pool D Boxscores

Match 1:
Player/End	1	2	3	4	Result	Report
Anna Ntenta (GRE)	0	0	1	4	5	Report
Niurka Callupe (PER)	3	1	0	0	4	Report
Match 2:
Player/End	1	2	3	4	Result	Report
Ayane Ichinoe (JPN)	0	3	0	0	3	Report
Stefania Ferrando (ARG)	3	0	2	1	6	Report
Match 3:
Player/End	1	2	3	4	Result	Report
Stefania Ferrando (ARG)	2	0	3	3	8	Report
Anna Ntenta (GRE)	0	2	0	0	2	Report
Match 4:
Player/End	1	2	3	4	Result	Report
Ayane Ichinoe (JPN)	0	0	0	1	1	Report
Niurka Callupe (PER)	1	1	3	0	5	Report
Match 5:
Player/End	1	2	3	4	Result	Report
Anna Ntenta (GRE)	0	0	0	0	0	Report
Ayane Ichinoe (JPN)	3	2	1	2	8	Report
Match 6:
Player/End	1	2	3	4	Result	Report
Niurka Callupe (PER)	2	0	0	0	2	Report
Stefania Ferrando (ARG)	0	1	1	1	3	Report

=== Elimination stage ===
The final stage (or knockout stage) will be played between 31 August and 2 September.

Quarter-finals
31 August, South Paris Arena
E Owczarz (POL)	1
E Calado (BRA)	5
31 August, South Paris Arena
S Ferrando (ARG)	3
J Leeson (AUS)	4
31 August, South Paris Arena
Ho YK (HKG)	3
L Kla-Han (THA)	2
31 August, South Paris Arena
Kang S-h (KOR)	3
A Ichinoe (JPN)	2

Semi-finals
1 September, South Paris Arena
E Calado (BRA)	1
J Leeson (AUS)	7
1 September, South Paris Arena
Ho YK (HKG)	4
Kang S-h (KOR)	1

Final
2 September, South Paris Arena
J Leeson (AUS)	2
Ho YK (HKG)	4
Bronze medal
1 September, South Paris Arena
E Calado (BRA)	2
Kang S-h (KOR)	7

Elimination Matches

Quarterfinals

Match QF1:
Player/End	1	2	3	4	Result	Report
E Owczarz (POL)	0	0	1	0	1	Report
E Calado (BRA)	3	1	0	1	5	Report
Match QF2:
Player/End	1	2	3	4	Result	Report
S Ferrando (ARG)	2	1	0	0	3	Report
J Leeson (AUS)	0	0	2	2	4	Report
Match QF3:
Player/End	1	2	3	4	Result	Report
Ho YK (HKG)	1	0	0	2	3	Report
L Kla-Han (THA)	0	1	1	0	2	Report
Match QF4:
Player/End	1	2	3	4	Result	Report
Kang S-h (KOR)	0	0	1	2	3	Report
A Ichinoe (JPN)	1	1	0	0	2	Report

Semifinals

Match SF1:
Player/End	1	2	3	4	Result	Report
E Calado (BRA)	0	0	0	1	1	Report
J Leeson (AUS)	4	2	1	0	7	Report
Match SF2:
Player/End	1	2	3	4	Result	Report
Ho YK (HKG)	1	0	2	1	4	Report
Kang S-h (KOR)	0	1	0	0	1	Report

Finals

Bronze medal match:
Player/End	1	2	3	4	Result	Report
E Calado (BRA)	0	0	0	2	2	Report
Kang S-h (KOR)	2	3	2	0	7	Report
Gold medal match:
Player/End	1	2	3	4	Result	Report
J Leeson (AUS)	0	0	1	1	2	Report
Ho YK (HKG)	2	2	0	0	4	Report
