= Boccia at the 2020 Summer Paralympics – Pairs BC3 =

Boccia – Mixed pairs BC3 at the XVI Paralympic Games
- Venue: Ariake Gymnastics Centre
- Date: 2–4 September 2021

Medalists
1st place, gold medalist(s)		Jeong Ho-won; Kim Han-soo; Choi Ye-jin	South Korea
2nd place, silver medalist(s)		Kazuki Takahashi; Keisuke Kawamoto; Keiko Tanaka	Japan
3rd place, bronze medalist(s)		Grigorios Polychronidis; Anna Ntenta; Anastasia Pyrgiotis	Greece

The mixed pairs BC3 boccia event at the 2020 Summer Paralympics will be contested between 2 and 4 September 2021 at the Ariake Gymnastics Centre. Since this event is a mixed event, both genders, male and female, compete in the event.

The competition starts with a pools stage, containing 2 pools with 5 teams each, it will be followed to the semifinals where the winners move to the finals to fight for gold and the losers will go to the bronze medal match to fight for bronze.

== Rosters ==
Each team contains three athletes. All team has a male (M) and female (F) athlete.

- Australia:
  - Daniel Michel (M)
  - Zoe Dix (M)
  - Jamieson Leeson (F)
- Brazil:
  - Evelyn de Oliveira (F)
  - Mateus Carvalho (M)
  - Evani Soares da Silva Calado (F)
- France:
  - Samir van der Beken (M)
  - Sonia Heckel (F)
  - Rodrigue Brenek (M)
- Great Britain:
  - Jamie McCowan (M)
  - Scott McCowan (M)
  - Beth Moulam (F)
- Greece:
  - Grigorios Polychronidis (M)
  - Anna Ntenta (F)
  - Anastasia Pyrgiotis (F)
- Hong Kong:
  - Ho Yuen Kei (F)
  - Tse Tak Wah (M)
  - Liu Wing Tung (F)
- Japan:
  - Kazuki Takahashi (M)
  - Keisuke Kawamoto (M)
  - Keiko Tanaka (F)
- South Korea:
  - Jeong Ho-won (M)
  - Kim Han-soo (M)
  - Choi Ye-jin (F)
- Portugal:
  - Roberto Mateus (M)
  - Jorge Cardoso (M)
  - Celina Lourenco (F)
- Thailand:
  - Somboon Chaipanich (F)
  - Ekkarat Chaemchoi (M)
  - Ladamanee Kla-Han (F)

== Results ==
=== Pool ===
The pools (or can be known as a group stage) will be played between 2 and 3 September 2021. The top two players in each pool will qualify to the quarterfinals.

==== Pool A ====
Athlete	Pld	W	L	PW	PA	Diff	Qualification
Greece	4	3	1	15	10	+5	Advance to quarter-finals
South Korea	4	3	1	15	7	+8	Advance to quarter-finals
Thailand	4	2	2	14	14	0	
Great Britain	4	1	3	14	13	+1	
France	4	1	3	7	21	-14	

Date	Time	Team 1	Score	Team 2
2 September	11:25	Greece	5–2	Thailand
2 September	11:25	South Korea	2 (3)–2 (0)	(United Kingdom) Great Britain
2 September	16:20	Greece	4–2	(United Kingdom) Great Britain
2 September	16:20	France	4–2	Thailand
3 September	9:30	Greece	3–4	France
3 September	9:30	South Korea	4–1	Thailand
3 September	14:25	South Korea	7–1	France
3 September	14:25	Great Britain (United Kingdom)	3–7	Thailand
3 September	18:05	France	7–0	(United Kingdom) Great Britain
3 September	18:05	Greece	3–2	South Korea

==== Pool B ====
Athlete	Pld	W	L	PW	PA	Diff	Qualification
Hong Kong	4	3	1	14	13	+1	Advance to quarter-finals
Japan	4	3	1	17	9	+8	Advance to quarter-finals
Australia	4	2	2	14	11	+3	
Brazil	4	2	2	17	14	+3	
Portugal	4	0	4	7	22	-15	

Date	Time	Team 1	Score	Team 2
2 September	11:25	Hong Kong	4–1	Portugal
2 September	11:25	Australia	2–3	Japan
2 September	16:20	Hong Kong	4 (2)–4 (0)	Japan
2 September	16:20	Brazil	7–3	Portugal
3 September	9:30	Hong Kong	3–5	Brazil
3 September	9:30	Australia	4–3	Portugal
3 September	14:25	Australia	5–2	Brazil
3 September	14:25	Japan	7–0	Portugal
3 September	18:05	Hong Kong	3 (1)–3 (0)	Australia
3 September	18:05	Brazil	3 (0)–3 (1)	Japan

== Knockout stage ==
The knockout stage will be played on 4 September.

Semi-finals
Greece	1
Japan	5
Hong Kong	2
South Korea	5

Finals
Japan	4 (0)
South Korea	4 (1)
Third place match
Greece	7
Hong Kong	0
