= Boccia at the 2024 Summer Paralympics – Men's individual BC3 =

Boccia – Men's individual BC3 at the XVII Paralympic Games
- Venue: South Paris Arena
- Date: 29 August - 2 September 2024
- Competitors: 16 from 15 nations

Medalists
1st place, gold medalist(s)		Jeong Ho-won	South Korea
2nd place, silver medalist(s)		Daniel Michel	Australia
3rd place, bronze medalist(s)		Grigorios Polychronidis	Greece

The men's individual BC3 boccia event at the 2024 Summer Paralympics was contested between 29 August and 2 September 2024 at the South Paris Arena.

The event structure begins with pool stages. The top two players from each of four pools then enter into the single-elimination stage, with the losing semifinalists playing off for bronze.

== Classification ==
The BC3 classification is described as follows:

BC3M/F – Players in this class have very severe locomotor dysfunction in all four extremities. Players in this class have no sustained grasp or release action and although they may have arm movement, they have insufficient range of movement to propel a boccia ball onto the court. They may use an assistive device such as a ramp to deliver the ball. They may compete using an assistant; assistants must keep their back to the court and their eyes averted from play.

== Results ==
=== Pool stages ===
The pool stage will be played between 29 and 31 August 2024. The top two players in each pool will qualify to the elimination rounds.

Pool A

Pos	Player	Pld	W	D	L	PF	PA	PD	Pts	Qualification	(Australia)	(United Kingdom) PW	(United Kingdom) WA	(South Africa)
1	Daniel Michel (AUS)	3	3	0	0	20	6	+14	6	Qualification for quarterfinal or playoff round	—	7–2	3–2	10–2
2	Patrick Wilson (GBR)	3	2	0	1	16	10	+6	4	Qualification for quarterfinal or playoff round	2–7	—	5–3	9–0
3	Will Arnott (GBR)	3	1	0	2	12	9	+3	2	Eliminated	2–3	3–5	—	7–1
4	Karabo Morapedi (RSA)	3	0	0	3	3	26	−23	0	Eliminated	2–10	0–9	1–7	—

Updated to match(es) played on 29 August 2024. Source: Paris 2024

Pool B

Pos	Player	Pld	W	D	L	PF	PA	PD	Pts	Qualification	(Poland)	(Hong Kong)	(Argentina)	(Czech Republic)
1	Damian Iskrzycki (POL)	3	3	0	0	17	7	+10	6	Qualification for quarterfinal or playoff round	—	6–4	7–1	4–2
2	Tse Tak Wah (HKG)	3	1	0	2	13	13	0	2	Qualification for quarterfinal or playoff round	4–6	—	6–3	3–4
3	Rodrigo Romero (ARG)	3	1	0	2	12	13	−1	2	Eliminated	1–7	3–6	—	8–0
4	Adam Peška (CZE)	3	1	0	2	6	15	−9	2	Eliminated	2–4	4–3	0–8	—

Updated to match(es) played on 21 July 2024. Source: Paris 2024

Pool C

Pos	Player	Pld	W	D	L	PF	PA	PD	Pts	Qualification	(South Korea)	(Thailand)	(Portugal)	(Colombia)
1	Jeong Ho-won (KOR)	3	3	0	0	20	4	+16	6	Qualification for quarterfinal or playoff round	—	4–0	4–2	12–2
2	Akkadej Choochuenklin (THA)	3	2	0	1	19	4	+15	4	Qualification for quarterfinal or playoff round	0–4	—	9–0	10–0
3	José Gonçalves (POR)	3	1	0	2	6	15	−9	2	Eliminated	2–4	0–9	—	4–2
4	Jesús Romero (COL)	3	0	0	3	4	26	−22	0	Eliminated	2–12	0–10	2–4	—

Updated to match(es) played on 21 July 2024. Source: Paris 2024

Pool D

Pos	Player	Pld	W	D	L	PF	PA	PD	Pts	Qualification	(Greece)	(France)	(Brazil)	(Japan)
1	Grigorios Polychronidis (GRE)	3	2	0	1	15	6	+9	4	Qualification for quarterfinal or playoff round	—	5–2	1–4	9–0
2	Jules Menard (FRA)	3	2	0	1	11	11	0	4	Qualification for quarterfinal or playoff round	2–5	—	5–4	4–2
3	Mateus Carvalho (BRA)	3	1	0	2	12	11	+1	2	Eliminated	4–1	4–5	—	4–5
4	Masayuki Arita (JPN)	3	1	0	2	7	17	−10	2	Eliminated	0–9	2–4	5–4	—

Updated to match(es) played on 29 August 2024. Source: Paris 2024

=== Elimination stage ===
The final stage (or knockout stage) will be played between 1 and 2 September.

Quarter-finals
1 September, South Paris Arena
Daniel Michel (AUS)	5
Rodrigo Romero (ARG)	0
1 September, South Paris Arena
G Polychronidis (GRE)	4
A Choochuenklin (THA)	1
1 September, South Paris Arena
D Iskrzycki (POL)	4
Patrick Wilson (GBR)	1
1 September, South Paris Arena
Jeong Ho-won (KOR)	4
Jules Menard (FRA)	1

Semi-finals
1 September, South Paris Arena
Daniel Michel (AUS)	6
G Polychronidis (GRE)	1
1 September, South Paris Arena
Damian Iskrzycki (POL)	1
Jeong Ho-won (KOR)	6

Final
2 September, South Paris Arena
Daniel Michel (AUS)	2
Jeong Ho-won (KOR)	5
Bronze medal
1 September, South Paris Arena
G Polychronidis (GRE)	4(1) *
Damian Iskrzycki (POL)	4(0)

Elimination Matches

Quarterfinals

Match QF1:
Player/End	1	2	3	4	Result	Report
Daniel Michel (AUS)	1	1	2	1	5	Report
Rodrigo Romero (ARG)	0	0	0	-	0	Report
Match QF2:
Player/End	1	2	3	4	Result	Report
Grigorios Polychronidis (GRE)	1	0	2	1	4	Report
Akkadej Choochuenklin (THA)	0	1	0	0	1	Report
Match QF3:
Player/End	1	2	3	4	Result	Report
Damian Iskrzycki (POL)	1	2	0	1	4	Report
&nb Patrick Wilson (GBR)	0	0	1	0	1	Report
Match QF4:
Player/End	1	2	3	4	Result	Report
Jeong Ho-won (KOR)	1	2	1	0	4	Report
Jules Menard (FRA)| 1	0	0	0	1	1	Report

Semifinals

Match SF1:
Player/End	1	2	3	4	Result	Report
Daniel Michel (AUS)	3	1	2	0	6	Report
Grigorios Polychronidis (GRE)	0	0	0	1	1	Report
Match SF2:
Player/End	1	2	3	4	Result	Report
Damian Iskrzycki (POL)	0	0	1	0	1	Report
Jeong Ho-won (KOR)	1	4	0	1	6	Report

Finals

Bronze medal match:
Player/End	1	2	3	4	Result	Report
Grigorios Polychronidis (GRE)	2	0	2	0	4*	Report
Damian Iskrzycki (POL)	0	3	0	1	4	Report
Gold medal match:
Player/End	1	2	3	4	Result	Report
Daniel Michel (AUS)	0	0	2	0	2	Report
Jeong Ho-won (KOR)	3	1	0	1	5	Report
