= Boccia at the 2016 Summer Paralympics – Individual BC3 =

Boccia – Individual BC3 at the XV Paralympic Games
- Venue: Sambodromo
- Dates: 16 September 2016 – 6 September 2016
- Competitors: 24

Medalists
1st place, gold medalist(s)		Ho Won Jeong	South Korea
2nd place, silver medalist(s)		Grigorios Polychronidis	Greece
3rd place, bronze medalist(s)		Jose Carlos Macedo	Portugal

The mixed individual BC3 boccia event at the 2016 Summer Paralympics was contested from 13 September to 16 September at Sambodromo in Rio de Janeiro. 24 competitors took part.

The event structure was amended from the 2012 event, with pool stages added. The top players from each of eight round robin pools of three entered into a quarter final single elimination stage, with the losing semifinalists playing off for bronze.

== Elimination rounds ==
Quarter-finals
Grigorios Polychronidis (GRE)	2*
Yuen Kei Ho (HKG)	2
Kim Han-soo (KOR)	4
Patrick Wilson (GBR)	3
Ho Won Jeong (KOR)	6
Evelyn De Oliveira (BRA)	0
Maria Bjurstroem (SWE)	0
Jose Carlos Macedo (POR)	7

Semi-finals
Grigorios Polychronidis (GRE)	4
Kim Han-soo (KOR)	1
Ho Won Jeong (KOR)	6
Jose Carlos Macedo (POR)	1

Final
Grigorios Polychronidis (GRE)	1
Ho Won Jeong (KOR)	8
Third place
Jose Carlos Macedo (POR)	5*
Kim Han-soo (KOR)	5

== Pool stages ==
=== Pool A ===
Boccia at the 2016 Summer Paralympics - Individual BC3 Pool A
Pos	Player	Pld	W	D	L	PF	PA	PD	Pts	H2H	Player	(South Korea)	(United Kingdom)	(Singapore)
1 Q	Ho Won Jeong (KOR)	2	2	0	0	14	2	+12	6	H2H	(South Korea)		7-1	7-1
2	Scott Mccowan (GBR)	2	1	0	1	4	9	-5	4	H2H	(United Kingdom)	1-7		3-2
3	N.M. Taha (SIN)	2	0	0	2	3	10	−7	2	H2H	(Singapore)	1-7	2-3	

=== Pool B ===
Rank	Competitor	MP	W	L	Points	KOR	BEL	CAN
1	Kim Han-soo (KOR)	2	2	0	7:3	x	3:2	4:1
2	Kenneth Verwimp (BEL)	2	1	1	9:5	2:3	x	7:2
3	Eric Bussiere (CAN)	2	0	2	3:11	1:4	2:7	x

=== Pool C ===
Rank	Competitor	MP	W	L	Points	GRE	AUS	GBR
1	Grigorios Polychronidis (GRE)	2	2	0	16:3	x	7:2	9:1
2	Daniel Michel (AUS)	2	1	1	5:9	2:7	x	3:2
3	Jamie Mccowan (GBR)	2	0	2	3:12	1:9	2:3	x

=== Pool D ===
Rank	Competitor	MP	W	L	Points	SWE	SIN	BRA
1	Maria Bjurstroem (SWE)	2	2	0	11:1	x	6:1	5:0
2	Sze Ning Toh (SIN)	2	1	1	7:8	1:6	x	6:2
3	Antonio Leme (BRA)	2	0	2	2:11	0:5	2:6	x

=== Pool E ===
Rank	Competitor	MP	W	L	Points	POR	KOR	CAN
1	Jose Carlos Macedo (POR)	2	2	0	10:3	x	3:1	7:2
2	Ye Jin Choi (KOR)	2	1	1	9:4	1:3	x	8:1
3	Bruno Garneau (CAN)	2	0	2	3:15	2:7	1:8	x

=== Pool F ===
Rank	Competitor	MP	W	L	Points	HKG	GRE	BEL
1	Yuen Kei Ho (HKG)	2	2	0	10:4	x	6:1	4:3
2	Anna Ntenta (GRE)	2	1	1	7:7	1:6	x	6:1
3	Pieter Cilissen (BEL)	2	0	2	4:10	3:4	1:6	x

Pool G

Rank	Competitor	MP	W	L	Points	GBR	JPN	POR
1	Patrick Wilson (GBR)	2	2	0	9:5	x	5:3	4:2
2	Kazuki Takahashi (JPN)	2	1	1	7:7	3:5	x	4:2
3	Mario Peixoto (POR)	2	0	2	4:8	2:4	2:4	x

Pool H

Rank	Competitor	MP	W	L	Points	BRA	CZE	POR
1	Evelyn De Oliveira (BRA)	2	2	0	12:2	x	6:1	6:1
2	Kamil Vasicek (CZE)	2	1	1	5:7	1:6	x	4:1
3	Armando Costa (POR)	2	0	2	2:10	1:6	1:4	x
