= Kang Sun-hee =

South Korean boccia player

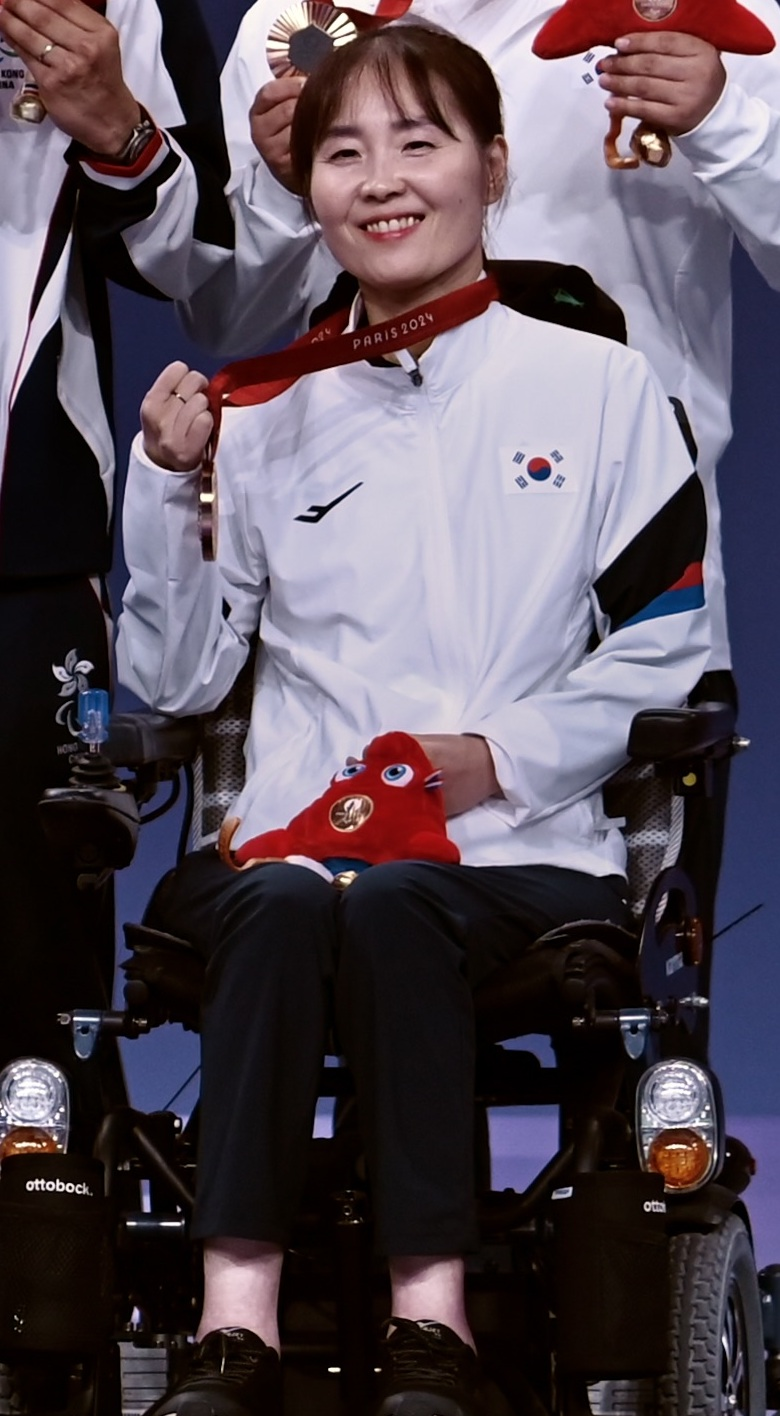
- Kang at the 2024 Summer Paralympics

Personal information
- Born: 18 July 1977 (age 48)
- Home town: Gwangju, South Korea

Sport
- Country: South Korea
- Sport: Boccia
- Disability class: BC3
Medal record
Boccia
Representing South Korea
Paralympic Games
Silver medal – second place	2024 Paris	Pairs BC3
Bronze medal – third place	2024 Paris	Individual BC3
Asian Para Games
Gold medal – first place	2022 Hangzhou	Pairs BC3

Kang Sun-hee (born 18 July 1977) is a South Korean boccia player. She represented South Korea at the 2024 Summer Paralympics.

== Career ==
Kang represented South Korea at the 2024 Summer Paralympics and won a bronze medal in the individual BC3 event. She also won a silver medal in the pairs BC3 event with Jeong Ho-won.
