= Maria-Eleni Kordali =

Greek boccia player

Medal record

Boccia

Representing Greece

Paralympic Games
Gold medal – first place	2012 London	Mixed Pairs BC3

Maria-Eleni Kordali is a Greek boccia player with a Paralympic boccia classification of BC3. Her specific disability is cerebral palsy. She won the gold medal during the 2012 Summer Paralympics in BC3 mixed pairs along with Nikolaos Pananos and Grigorios Polychronidis.

She was awarded as the Best Greek female athlete with a disability for 2012.
