= Boccia at the 2016 Summer Paralympics – Pairs BC3 =

Boccia – Pairs BC3 at the XV Paralympic Games
- Venue: Sambodromo
- Dates: 10 September 2016 – 12 September 2016
- Competitors: 8 teams from 8 nations

Medalists
1st place, gold medalist(s)		Evelyn de Oliveira; Evani Soares da Silva; Antonio Leme	Brazil
2nd place, silver medalist(s)		Jeong Ho Won; Kim Han-soo; Choi Ye Jin	South Korea
3rd place, bronze medalist(s)		Anna Ntenta; Nikolaos Pananos; Grigorios Polychronidis	Greece

The mixed pairs BC3 boccia event at the 2016 Summer Paralympics was contested from 10 September to 13 September at Sambodromo in Rio de Janeiro. 8 teams of competitors took part.

The event structure was amended from the 2012 event, with pool stages added. The top two teams from each of two pools then entered into a quarterfinal single-elimination stage, with the losing semifinalists playing off for bronze.

== Elimination stages ==
Semi finals
1	South Korea	6
4	Greece	1
3	Brazil	6
2	Singapore	2

Gold medal match
South Korea	2
Brazil	5
Bronze medal match
Greece	8
Singapore	1

== Pool stages ==
=== Pool A ===
Boccia at the 2016 Summer Paralympics - Mixed pairs BC3 - Pool A
Pos	Country	Player	Pld	W	D	L	PF	PA	PD	Pts	H2H	Player	(South Korea)	(Brazil)	(Belgium)	(Canada)
1 **Q**	**South Korea**	Jeong Ho Won; Kim Han-soo; Choi Ye Jin	3	3	0	0	21	5	+16	**9**	H2H	(South Korea)		4-1	7-3	10-1
2 **Q**	**Brazil**	Evelyn de Oliveira; Evani Soares da Silva; Antonio Leme	3	2	0	1	16	8	+8	**7**	H2H	(Brazil)	1-4		4-2	11-2
3	**Belgium**	Kirsten de Laender; Pieter Cilissen; Kenneth Verwimp	3	1	0	2	12	11	-1	**5**	H2H	(Belgium)	3-7	2-4		7-0
4	**Canada**	Marylou Martineau; Bruno Garneau; Eric Bussiere	3	0	0	3	3	28	-25	**3**	H2H	(Canada)	1-10	2-11	0-7	

=== Pool B ===
Boccia at the 2016 Summer Paralympics - Mixed pairs BC3 - Pool B
Pos	Country	Player	Pld	W	D	L	PF	PA	PD	Pts	H2H	Player	(Singapore)	(Greece)	(Portugal)	(United Kingdom)
1 **Q**	**Singapore**	Sze Ning Toh; N.Taha Mohammad	3	2	0	1	9	6	+3	**7**	H2H	(Singapore)		**3-2***	5-1	1-3
2 **Q**	**Greece**	Anna Ntenta; Nikolaos Pananos; Grigorios Polychronidis	3	2	0	1	11	6	+5	**7**	H2H	(Greece)	**2-3***		5-2	4-1
3	**Portugal**	Armando Costa; Jose Carlos Macedo; Mario Peixoto	3	1	0	2	7	13	-6	**5**	H2H	(Portugal)	1-5	2-5		4-3**
4	**Great Britain**	Scott McCowan; Jamie McCowan; Patrick Wilson	3	1	0	2	7	9	-2	**5**	H2H	(United Kingdom)	3-1	1-4	3-4**	

* : Tie for first broken on head to head record, relevant matches in bold.
**: Tie for third broken on head to head record, relevant matches in bold.
