= Boccia at the 2008 Summer Paralympics – Pairs BC3 =

Pairs BC3 at the XIII Paralympic Games
- Paralympic Boccia
- Venue: Olympic Green Convention Center
- Dates: 10–12 September 2008
- Competitors: 8

Medalists
1st place, gold medalist(s)		Jeong Ho Won; Park Keon Woo; Shin Bo Mee	South Korea
2nd place, silver medalist(s)		Yolanda Martin; Santiago Pesquera; José Manuel Rodríguez	Spain
3rd place, bronze medalist(s)		Eunice Raimundo; Mario Peixoto; Armando Costa	Portugal

The Boccia Pairs BC3 event at the 2008 Summer Paralympics was held in the Olympic Green Convention Center on 10–12 September. The preliminary stages consisted of 2 round-robin groups of 4 competitors each. The top two teams in each group qualified for the final stages. The event was won by the team representing South Korea.

== Results ==
=== Preliminaries ===
==== Pool A ====
Rank	Team	MP	W	L	Points	KOR	ESP	CAN	CHN
1	South Korea	3	3	0	27:6	x	9:3	9:1	9:2
2	Spain	3	1	2	13:15	3:9	x	9:1	1:5
3	Canada	3	1	2	10:20	1:9	1:9	x	8:2
4	China	3	1	2	9:18	2:9	5:1	2:8	x

==== Pool B ====
Rank	Team	MP	W	L	Points	POR	THA	GRE	NZL
1	Portugal	3	3	0	20:7	x	7:1	5:2	8:4
2	Thailand	3	1	2	8:13	1:7	x	5:2	2:4*
3	Greece	3	1	2	7:12	2:5	2:5	x	3:2*
4	New Zealand	3	1	2	10:13	4:8	4:2*	2:3*	x

- after extra (fifth) end

=== Competition bracket ===
Semi-finals
South Korea	15
Thailand	0
Portugal	4
Spain	6

Final
South Korea	8
Spain	1
Third place
Thailand	1
Portugal	4

== Entry list ==
South Korea Jeong Ho Won; Park Keon Woo; Shin Bo Mee	Spain Yolanda Martin; Santiago Pesquera; José Manuel Rodríguez	Canada Monica Martino; Alison Kabush; Paul Gauthier	China Shen Cong; Zhu Heqiao; Zhu Jianhui
Portugal Eunice Raimundo; Mario Peixoto; Armando Costa	Thailand Akarapol Punsnit; Vilasinee Sukkarath; Tanimpat Visaratanunta	Greece Maria Stavropoulou; Grigorios Polychronidis; Dimitrios Michos	New Zealand Henk Dijkstra; Greig Jackson; Mandy Slade
