= Boccia at the 2008 Summer Paralympics – Individual BC3 =

Individual BC3 at the XIII Paralympic Games
- Paralympic Boccia
- Venue: Olympic Green Convention Center
- Dates: 7–9 September 2008
- Competitors: 24 from 8 nations

Medalists
1st place, gold medalist(s)		Park Keon-woo	South Korea
2nd place, silver medalist(s)		Grigorios Polychronidis	Greece
3rd place, bronze medalist(s)		Jeong Ho-won	South Korea

The Boccia Individual BC3 event at the 2008 Summer Paralympics was held in the Olympic Green Convention Center on 7–9 September. The preliminary stages consisted of 6 round-robin groups of 4 competitors each. The winner of each group plus the two best second place players (decided from among those with two match victories by points difference) qualified for the final stages. The event was won by Park Keon Woo, representing South Korea.

== Results ==
- indicates matches in which an extra (fifth) end was played

=== Preliminaries ===
==== Pool A ====
Rank	Competitor	MP	W	L	Points	GRE	THA	NZL	CHN
1	Grigorios Polychronidis (GRE)	3	3	0	37:1	x	7:0	19:0	11:1
2	Vilasinee Sukkarath (THA)	3	2	1	9:12	0:7	x	5:4	4:1
3	Henk Dijkstra (NZL)	3	1	2	17:24	0:19	4:5	x	13:0
4	Zhu Heqiao (CHN)	3	0	3	2:28	1:11	1:4	0:13	x

==== Pool B ====
Rank	Competitor	MP	W	L	Points	POR	CAN	ESP	GRE
1	Armando Costa (POR)	3	3	0	24:5	x	5:3	8:0	11:2
2	Paul Gauthier (CAN)	3	2	1	17:7	3:5	x	5:1	9:1
3	Yolanda Martin (ESP)	3	1	2	13:13	0:8	1:5	x	12:0
4	Maria Stavropoulou (GRE)	3	0	3	3:32	2:11	1:9	0:12	x

==== Pool C ====
Rank	Competitor	MP	W	L	Points	KOR	CHN	CAN	THA
1	Park Keon-woo (KOR)	3	3	0	20:6	x	5:2	7:2	8:2
2	Shen Cong (CHN)	3	1	2	11:14	2:5	x	5:4	4:5*
3	Monica Martino (CAN)	3	1	2	9:14	2:7	4:5	x	3:2*
4	Akarapol Punsnit (THA)	3	1	2	9:15	2:8	5:4*	2:3*	x

==== Pool D ====
Rank	Competitor	MP	W	L	Points	KOR	POR	THA	NZL
1	Jeong Ho-won (KOR)	3	3	0	25:3	x	6:0	5:3	14:0
2	Mário Peixoto (POR)	3	2	1	17:6	0:6	x	5:0	12:0
3	Tanimpat Visaratanunta (THA)	3	1	2	14:10	3:5	0:5	x	11:0
4	Mandy Slade (NZL)	3	0	3	0:37	0:14	0:12	0:11	x

==== Pool E ====
Rank	Competitor	MP	W	L	Points	ESP	CAN	POR	GRE
1	Santiago Pesquera (ESP)	3	2	1	22:9	x	1:5	7:4	14:0
2	Alison Kabush (CAN)	3	2	1	14:6	5:1	x	3:4	6:1
3	Eunice Raimundo (POR)	3	2	1	13:11	4:7	4:3	x	5:1
4	Dimitrios Michos (GRE)	3	0	3	2:25	0:14	1:6	1:5	x

==== Pool F ====
Rank	Competitor	MP	W	L	Points	KOR	ESP	NZL	CHN
1	Shin Bo-mee (KOR)	3	3	0	23:4	x	14:0	6:2	3:2
2	José Manuel Rodríguez Vazquez (ESP)	3	2	1	10:18	0:14	x	4:3*	6:1
3	Greig Jackson (NZL)	3	1	2	9:12	2:6	3:4*	x	4:2
4	Zhu Jianhui (CHN)	3	0	3	5:13	2:3	1:6	2:4	x

=== Competition bracket ===
Quarter-finals
Grigorios Polychronidis (GRE)	6
Paul Gauthier (CAN)	3
Jeong Ho-won (KOR)	8
Santiago Pesquera (ESP)	0
Armando Costa (POR)	2*
Mario Peixoto (POR)	3*
Park Keon-woo (KOR)	8
Shin Bo-mee (KOR)	0

Semi-finals
Grigorios Polychronidis (GRE)	4
Jeong Ho-won (KOR)	1
Mario Peixoto (POR)	3
Park Keon-woo (KOR)	4

Final
Grigorios Polychronidis (GRE)	2
Park Keon-woo (KOR)	3
Third place
Jeong Ho-won (KOR)	12
Mario Peixoto (POR)	0
