= Nikolaos Pananos =

Greek boccia player (born 1968)

Medal record

Boccia

Representing Greece

Paralympic Games
| Gold medal – first place | 2012 London | Mixed Pairs BC3 |
| Bronze medal – third place | 2016 Rio de Janeiro | Mixed Pairs BC3 |

Nikolaos Pananos (Greek: Νικόλαος Πανανός), born on 29 March 1968 in Athens, is a Greek boccia player with a Paralympic boccia classification of BC3. His specific disability is cerebral palsy. He won the gold medal during the 2012 Summer Paralympics in BC3 mixed pairs along with Maria-Eleni Kordali and Grigorios Polychronidis. In the 2016 Summer Paralympics he won the bronze medal at the same event.

He was awarded as the Best Greek male athlete with a disability for 2012.
