= Adam Peška =

Czech Paralympic boccia player

Personal information
- Born: 8 April 1997 (age 29) Havlíčkův Brod
Medal record
Boccia
Representing Czech Republic
Paralympic Games
Gold medal – first place	2020 Tokyo	Mixed Individual BC3

Adam Peška (born 8 April 1997 in Havlíčkův Brod) is a competitor for Czech Republic at the 2020 Summer Paralympics. In his Paralympic debut he won gold in Boccia at the 2020 Summer Paralympics. He has Duchenne muscular dystrophy.

Peška won the International Paralympic Committee’s Best Male Debut Athlete at the 2021 Paralympic Sport Awards.

Peška is currently ranked 1st in the BC3 male individual rankings.
