= Verónica Pamiés =

Spanish boccia player (born 1976)

Personal information
- Full name: Verónica Pamiés Morera
- Nationality: Spanish
- Born: 23 March 1976 (age 50) Aruba

Sport
- Country: Spain
- Sport: Boccia

Verónica Pamiés Morera (born 23 March 1976 in Aruba) is a Spanish boccia player, who has represented the country internationally at the Paralympic Games.

== Boccia ==
Pamies is a BC3 classified boccia player, and is a member of the Infinits Somriures club.

Elche, Spain hosted the Spanish Boccia Club Championship in June 2011, with Pamies participating in the event. She finished third in the BC3 individual and pairs events. The Belfast, Northern Ireland hosted Boccia World Championships were held in August 2011, and she participated. The event was part of the ranking process to qualify for the London Paralympic Games. Playing in the team competition, her team was eliminated in the group stage following loses to Croatia, Greece and Singapore. She could not get past the group stage in the individual competition either.

In January 2012, Pamies participated in a boccia training camp organized by the Spanish Cerebral Palsy Federation of Sports (FEDPC) and the Spanish Sports Federation for Persons with Physical Disabilities (FEDDF) along with 24 other boccia players from around Spain held at CRE San Andrés. The camp was part of national team preparations for the London Paralympics. She competed at the 2012 Summer Paralympics. She lost 1-8 in the round of 16. She was a member of the Spanish delegation at the European Championships contested in June 2013 in Guimaraes, Portugal. In October 2013, she was ranked the second best Spanish competitor in her classification.
