= Sandra Peña =

Spanish boccia player (born 1983)

Personal information
- Full name: Sandra Peña Cortés
- Nationality: Spanish
- Born: 1983 (age 42–43) Logroño, La Rioja, Spain

Sport
- Country: Spain
- Sport: Boccia

Sandra Peña Cortés (born 1983) is a Spanish boccia player who has represented the country internationally at the Paralympic Games after finishing first in a National competition in 2011.

== Boccia ==
Peña is a BC3 classified boccia player and is a member of the A.R. Deporte Para Todos club.

Lisbon hosted the World Championship in June 2010, and Peña was a member of the Spain national team. Competing in the BC3 team event, her team finished fifth. In the individual event, she was eliminated in the first round. Elche, Spain hosted the Spain Boccia Club Championship in June 2011, with Peña participating in the event. She finished first in the BC3 individual event.

The Belfast, Northern Ireland-hosted Boccia World Championship was held in August 2011, and Peña participated. The event was part of the ranking process to qualify for the London Paralympic Games. Playing in the team competition, her team was eliminated in the group stage following loses to Croatia, Greece, and Singapore. She could not get past the group stage in the individual competition either. In January 2012, she participated in a boccia training camp organized by the Spain Cerebral Palsy Federation of Sports (FEDPC) and the Spanish Sports Federation for Persons with Physical Disabilities (FEDDF), along with 24 other boccia players from around Spain, held at CRE San Andrés. The camp was part of national team preparations for the London Paralympics. She competed at the 2012 Summer Paralympics. She won 3–2 in the round of 16. She was a member of Spain's delegation at the European Championships contested in June 2013 in Guimaraes, Portugal. In October 2013, she was ranked the first in her classification in Spain. Playing pairs with Hilario José Pardo for A.R. Deporte Para Todos, the pair were ranked first.
