= Kirsten De Laender =

Personal information
- Born: 22 July 1993 (age 32) Herzele, Belgium

Sport
- Country: Belgium
- Sport: Boccia
Medal record
Boccia
Representing Belgium
Summer Paralympics
Bronze medal – third place	2012 London	Mixed pairs BC3
World Boccia Championships
Bronze medal – third place	2010 Lisbon	Mixed pairs BC3

Kirsten De Laender (born July 22, 1993) is a Belgian Paralympian. Her first Paralympics was London 2012, where she won a bronze medal in boccia for mixed pairs BC3. De Laender also competed in the 2016 Summer Paralympics in Rio de Janeiro.

== Career ==
At the 2010 Boccia World Championships in Lisbon, she won a bronze medal as part of a pair.

At the 2012 Summer Paralympics, in London, she won a bronze medal in Mixed Pairs BC3, with Pieter Cilissen and Pieter Verlinden. She also competed in Mixed Individual BC3.

At the 2016 Summer Paralympics, she competed in Boccia Mixed Pairs BC3.
