= Anna Ntenta =

Greek boccia player

Medal record

Boccia

Representing Greece

Paralympic Games
Bronze medal – third place	2016 Rio	Mixed Pairs BC3
Bronze medal – third place	2020 Tokyo	Mixed Pairs BC3

Anna Ntenta is a Greek boccia player with a Paralympic boccia classification of BC3. She won the bronze medal during the 2016 Summer Paralympics in BC3 mixed pairs along with Nikolaos Pananos and Grigorios Polychronidis and also a second bronze medal at the 2020 Summer Paralympics in BC3 mixed pairs along with Grigorios Polychronidis and Anastasia Pyrgioti.

She was one of the two flag bearers for Greece at the 2020 Paralympics in Tokyo.
