= Tse Tak Wah =

Hong Kong Paralympic boccia player

Personal information
- Born: 5 June 1985 (age 41)

Sport
- Country: Hong Kong
- Sport: Boccia
- Disability class: BC3
Medal record
Men's boccia
Representing Hong Kong
Paralympic Games
Gold medal – first place	2024 Paris	Pairs BC3
Asian Para Games
Gold medal – first place	2018 Jakarta	Pairs BC3
Silver medal – second place	2022 Hangzhou	Pairs BC3

Tse Tak Wah (Chinese: 謝德樺; born 5 June 1985) is a Hong Kong boccia player.

== Career ==
Tse represented Hong Kong at the 2024 Summer Paralympics and won a gold medal in the pairs BC3 event.
