= Pieter Cilissen =

Personal information
- Nationality: Belgium
- Born: 3 January 1978 (age 48) Tongeren, Belgium

Sport
- Country: Belgium
- Sport: Boccia
Medal record
Boccia
Representing Belgium
Summer Paralympics
Bronze medal – third place	2012 London	Mixed pairs BC3
World Boccia Championships
Bronze medal – third place	2010 Lisbon	Mixed pairs BC3

Pieter Cilissen (born January 3, 1978) is a Belgian Paralympian and Boccia player. His active playing career started in 1997 at the age of 19 and ended in 2019 at the age of 41, making his career of 22 years at the international stage a near unicum. His first Paralympics was Sydney 2000 where he finished 5th in the Pairs with Jean-Luc Béro. He missed Athens 2004 and Beijing 2008 but in London 2012, he won a bronze medal in boccia for mixed pairs BC3. Cilissen also competed in the 2016 Summer Paralympics in Rio de Janeiro but failed to get a medal.

== Personal life ==
Due to an oxygen defect at birth, Cilissen has cerebral palsy, which leaves him incapable of controlling the movement of arms and legs and impediments his speech. He lives in Sint-Pieters-Woluwe.

== Career ==
At the 2010 Boccia World Championships in Lisbon, he won a bronze medal in the Pairs BCS together with Kirsten De Laender and Pieter Verlinden.

At the 2012 Summer Paralympics, in London, he won a bronze medal in Pairs BC3, with Kirsten De Laender and Pieter Verlinden. H also competed in Mixed Individual BC3 but was eliminated in the 1/8th final.

At the 2015 Boccia European Team and Pairs Championships, in Guildford, Great-Britain, Cilisson won the Pairs competition together with Kenneth Verwimp and Julie Lambrechts.

At the 2016 Summer Paralympics, he competed in Boccia Mixed Pairs BC3.

== Awards ==
In 2013, Cilissen received Brussel's Bronze Zinneke, an award given to people who contribute to the image of Brussels. He was the first Paralympic athlete to receive the award. He is now officially an "Ambassador of Brussels", following in the footsteps of such other famous Brussels athletes as Eddy Merckx, Paul Van Himst, Vincent Kompany etc.

In February 2016, Cilissen received Belgium's Trophy Victor Boin, the first Boccia player to receive the award.
