= Evani Soares da Silva =

Brazilian boccia player

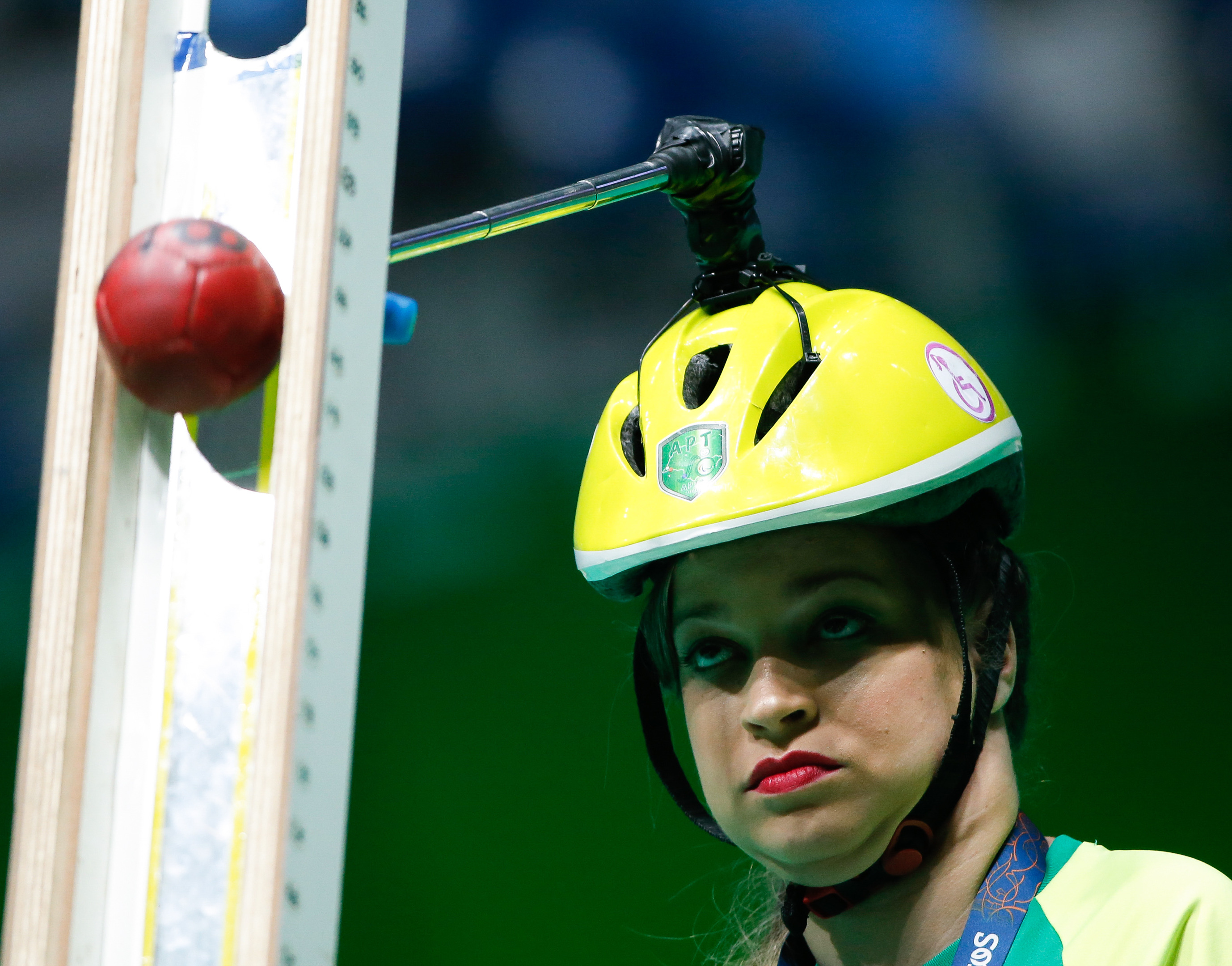
- Soares da Silva at 2016 Summer Paralympics

Personal information
- Full name: Evani Soares da Silva Calado
- Born: 29 November 1989 (age 36) Garanhuns, Brazil

Sport
- Country: Brazil
- Sport: Boccia
- Disability: Cerebral palsy
Medal record
Boccia
Representing Brazil
Paralympic Games
Gold medal – first place	2016 Rio de Janeiro	Mixed pairs BC3

Evani Soares da Silva Calado (born 29 November 1989 in São Paulo) is a Brazilian Paralympic boccia player. She won a gold medal at the 2016 Summer Paralympics in Rio de Janeiro, in bocce BC3 mixed doubles, with Antônio Leme and Evelyn de Oliveira.

She competed at the 2020 Summer Paralympics, in Boccia Individual BC3, and Boccia Pairs BC3.
