= Ho Yuen Kei =

Hong Kong boccia player

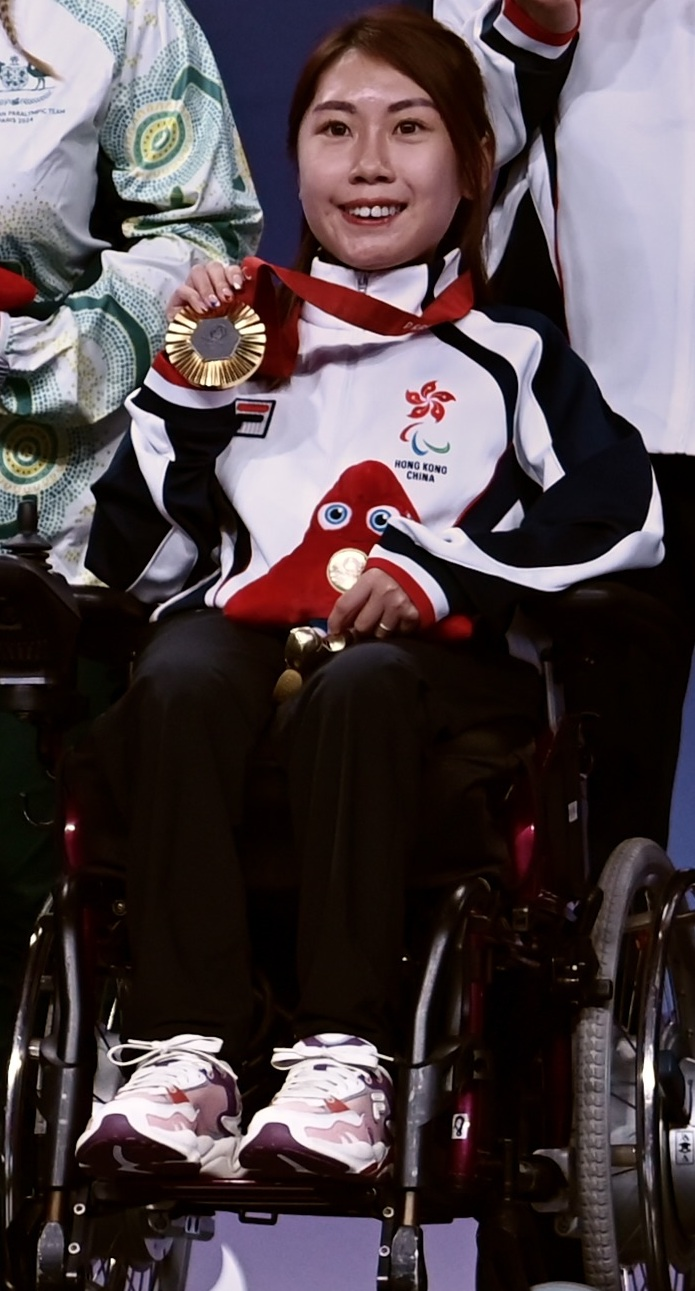
- Ho Yuen Kei at the 2024 Summer Paralympics

Personal information
- Born: 9 November 1993 (age 32)

Sport
- Country: Hong Kong
- Sport: Boccia
Medal record
Boccia
Representing Hong Kong
Paralympic Games
Gold medal – first place	2024 Paris	Individual BC3
Gold medal – first place	2024 Paris	Pairs BC3
Asian Para Games
Gold medal – first place	2018 Jakarta	Pairs BC3
Bronze medal – third place	2014 Incheon	Pairs BC3
Bronze medal – third place	2018 Jakarta	Individual BC3

Ho Yuen Kei (Chinese: 何宛淇; born 9 November 1993) is a Hong Kong boccia player. She competed at the 2024 Summer Paralympics, reaching the finals of the women's individual BC3 event.
