= Jeong Ho-won =

South Korean Paralympic boccia player

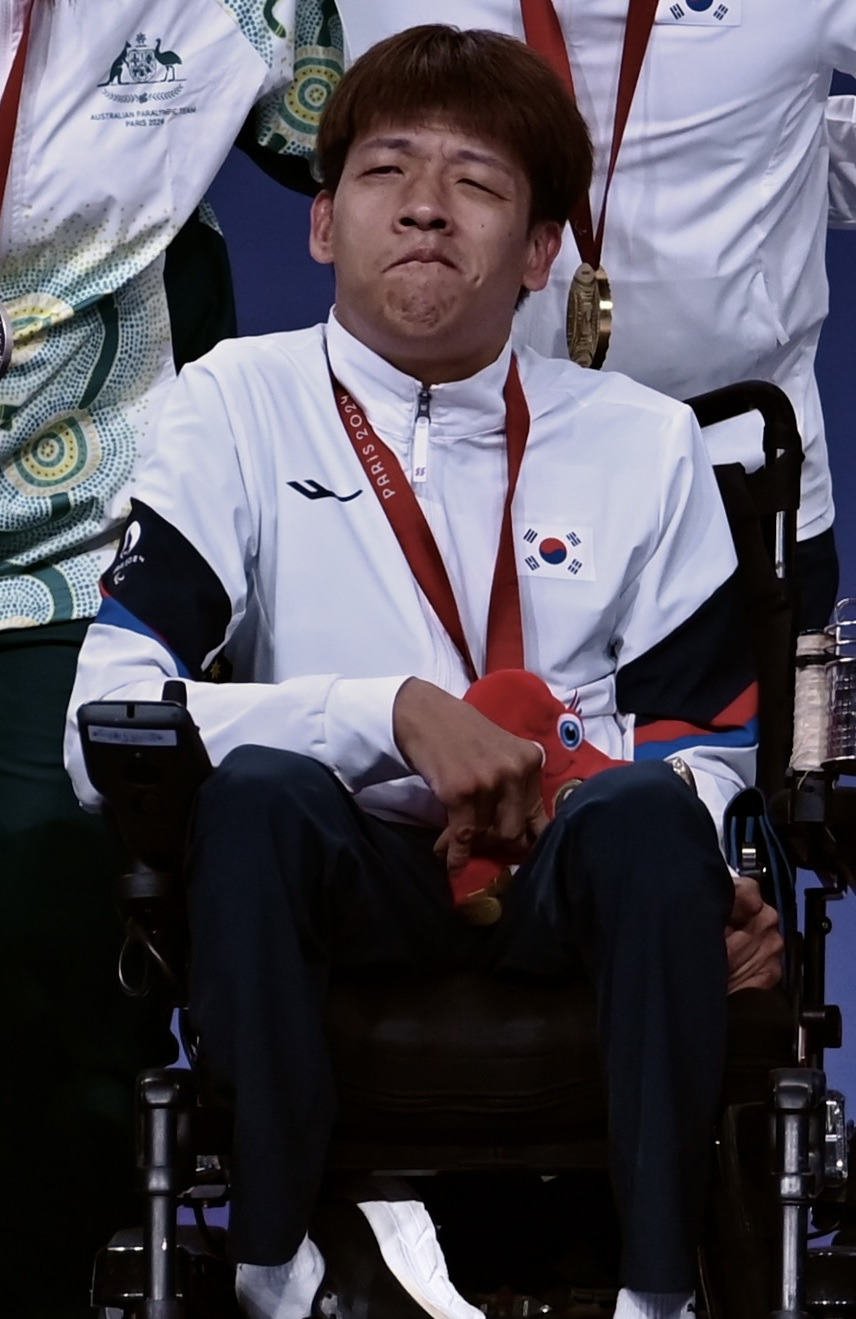
- Jeong Ho-won at the 2024 Summer Paralympics

Personal information
- Born: 12 February 1986 (age 40) Yeoju, Gyeonggi, South Korea

Sport
- Sport: Boccia
- Disability class: BC3
Medal record
Paralympic Games
Gold medal – first place	2008 Beijing	Pairs BC3
Gold medal – first place	2016 Rio de Janeiro	Individual BC3
Gold medal – first place	2020 Tokyo	Pairs BC3
Gold medal – first place	2024 Paris	Individual BC3
Silver medal – second place	2012 London	Individual BC3
Silver medal – second place	2016 Rio de Janeiro	Pairs BC3
Silver medal – second place	2024 Paris	Pairs BC3
Bronze medal – third place	2008 Beijing	Individual BC3
Asian Para Games
Gold medal – first place	2014 Incheon	Pairs BC3
Gold medal – first place	2018 Jakarta	Individual BC3
Gold medal – first place	2022 Hangzhou	Pairs BC3
Silver medal – second place	2010 Guangzhou	Individual BC3
Silver medal – second place	2014 Incheon	Individual BC3
Silver medal – second place	2022 Hangzhou	Individual BC3
Bronze medal – third place	2018 Jakarta	Pairs BC3

Jeong Ho-won (Korean: 정호원, born 12 February 1986) is a Paralympic boccia player from South Korea.

== Career ==
At the 2008 Summer Paralympics he won a bronze in individual - BC3 and shared a gold for pairs - BC3. At the 2012 Summer Paralympics in London he won a silver medal in the individual event. At the 2016 Summer Paralympics he won a gold in individual and a silver in pairs.

== Personal life ==
He has cerebral palsy as a result of falling at age one.
