= Evelyn de Oliveira =

Brazilian boccia player

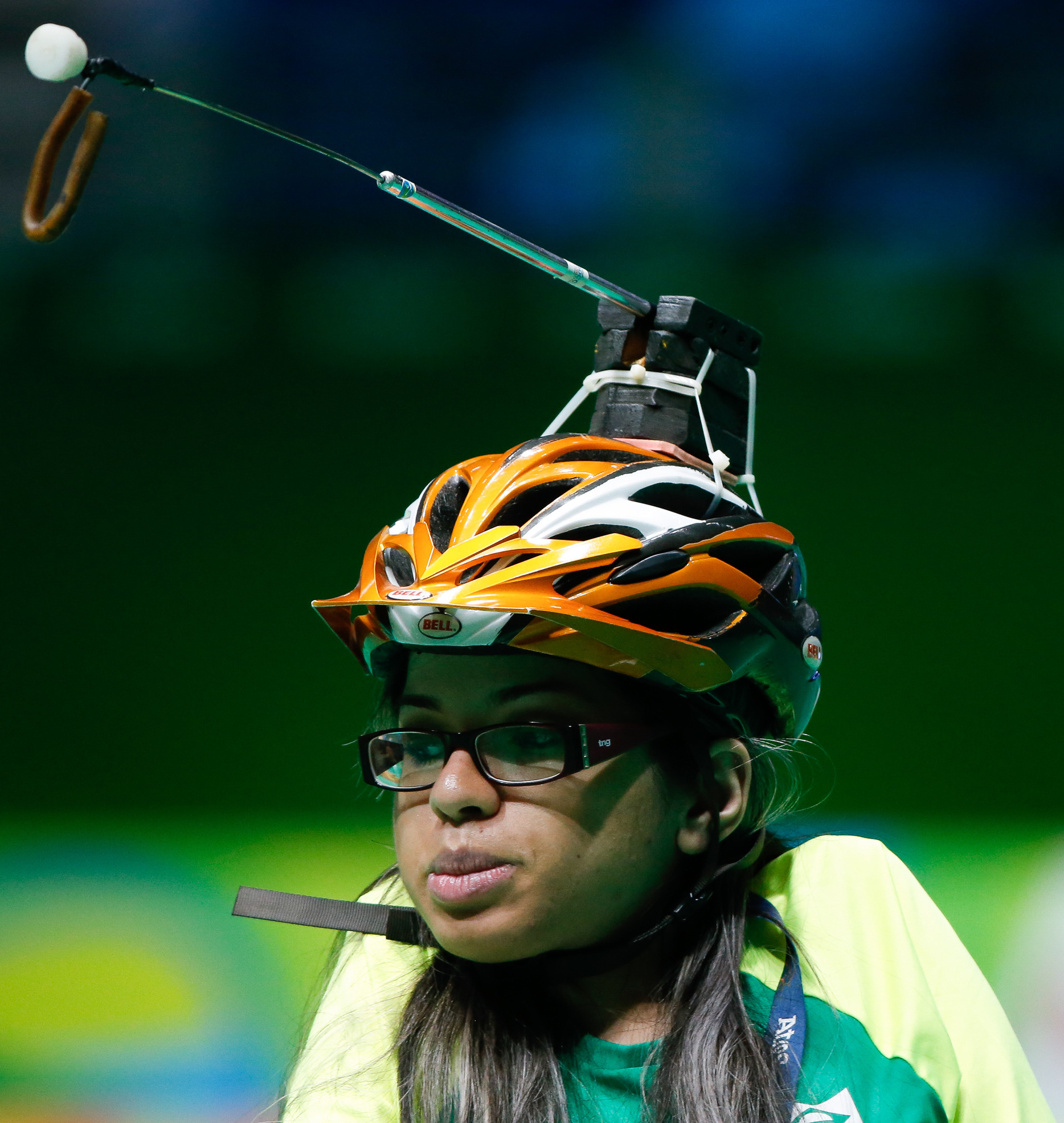
- de Oliveira at 2016 Summer Paralympics

Personal information
- Full name: Evelyn Vieira de Oliveira
- Born: 17 August 1987 (age 38) Mauá, São Paulo, Brazil

Sport
- Country: Brazil
- Sport: Boccia
- Disability class: BC3
Medal record
Boccia
Representing Brazil
Paralympic Games
Gold medal – first place	2016 Rio de Janeiro	Mixed pairs BC3
Parapan American Games
Gold medal – first place	2019 Lima	Pairs BC3
Gold medal – first place	2019 Lima	Individual BC3

Evelyn Vieira de Oliveira (born 17 August 1987) is a Brazilian Paralympic boccia player.

She won a gold medal at the 2016 Summer Paralympics in Rio de Janeiro, in the bocce BC3 mixed doubles, with Antônio Leme and Evani Soares da Silva. She competed in Individual BC3, but was eliminated in the Quarter-finals.

She competed at the 2020 Summer Paralympics in Boccia at the Mixed individual BC3, but was eliminated in the quarterfinals.
