= Daniel Michel =

Australian boccia player (born 1995)

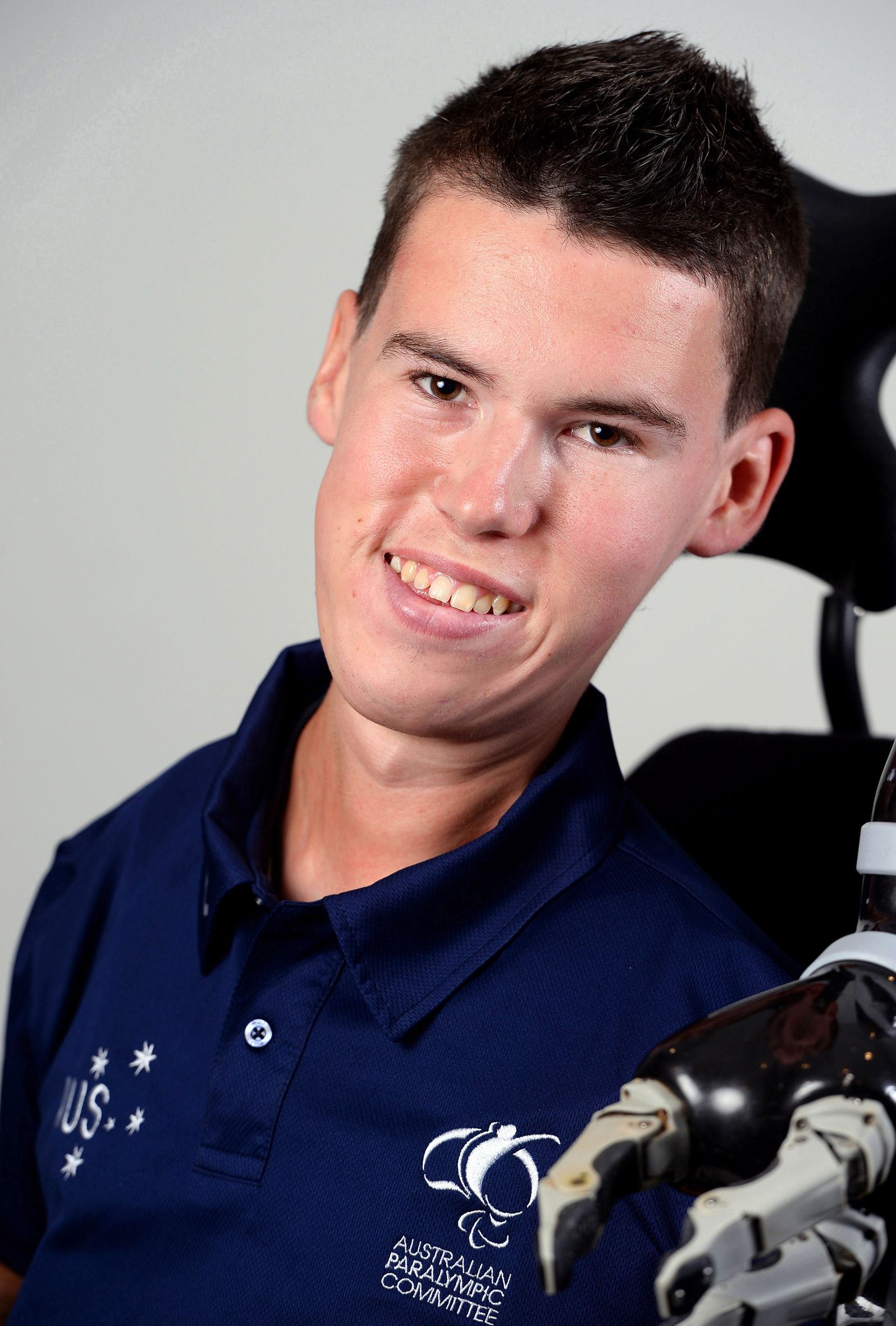
- 2016 Australian Paralympic team portrait

Personal information
- Nationality: Australia
- Born: 18 August 1995 (age 30) Maroubra, New South Wales, Australia

Sport
- Sport: Boccia
- Disability class: BC3
Medal record
Boccia
Paralympic Games
Silver medal – second place	2024 Paris	Individual BC3
Bronze medal – third place	2020 Tokyo	Mixed BC3
World Championships
Silver medal – second place	2018 Liverpool	Mixed BC3
Bronze medal – third place	2018 Liverpool	Men's BC3
Gold medal – first place	2022 Rio	Men's BC3
Gold medal – first place	2022 Rio	Mixed Pairs BC3

Daniel "Dan' Michel (born 18 August 1995) is an Australian boccia player. He represented Australia at the 2016 Rio Paralympics and 2020 Tokyo Paralympics. He won the bronze medal in the Mixed B3 at the Tokyo Paralympics. He won two gold medals at the 2022 World Championships.

== Early life ==
Michel was born on 18 August 1995 in the eastern Sydney suburb of Maroubra, New South Wales, before his family relocated to the Sutherland Shire in the early 2000s. His mother is of Dutch origin, having been born in The Netherlands and immigrating to Australia in the early 1990s, whilst his father is Australian. He was born with spinal muscular atrophy which means he has minimal movement and strength throughout his body. Daniel attended Heathcote High School and graduated in 2013.

== Boccia ==
Michel was introduced to boccia as a 15 year old through a Muscular Dystrophy NSW camp. He is classified as a BC3 athlete. He came third in his first junior titles and this gave him the encouragement to increase his training. This led to him winning the junior title at his second attempt. Michel was then selected in an Australian Paralympic Committee Paralympic Preparation Program for the Rio Games. His first international competition was at the 2013 Asia and Oceania Championships where he finished fifth and attained a world ranking of 35. At the 2014 World Championships in Beijing, China, he finished 36th. He finished sixth at the 2016 Boccia Individual World Championships. In 2016, he was a New South Wales Institute of Sport scholarship holder and is coached by Australian head coach Ken Halliday. He was selected to represent Australia at the 2016 Rio Paralympics, becoming the first Australian player selected to compete at the Paralympics since 2000.

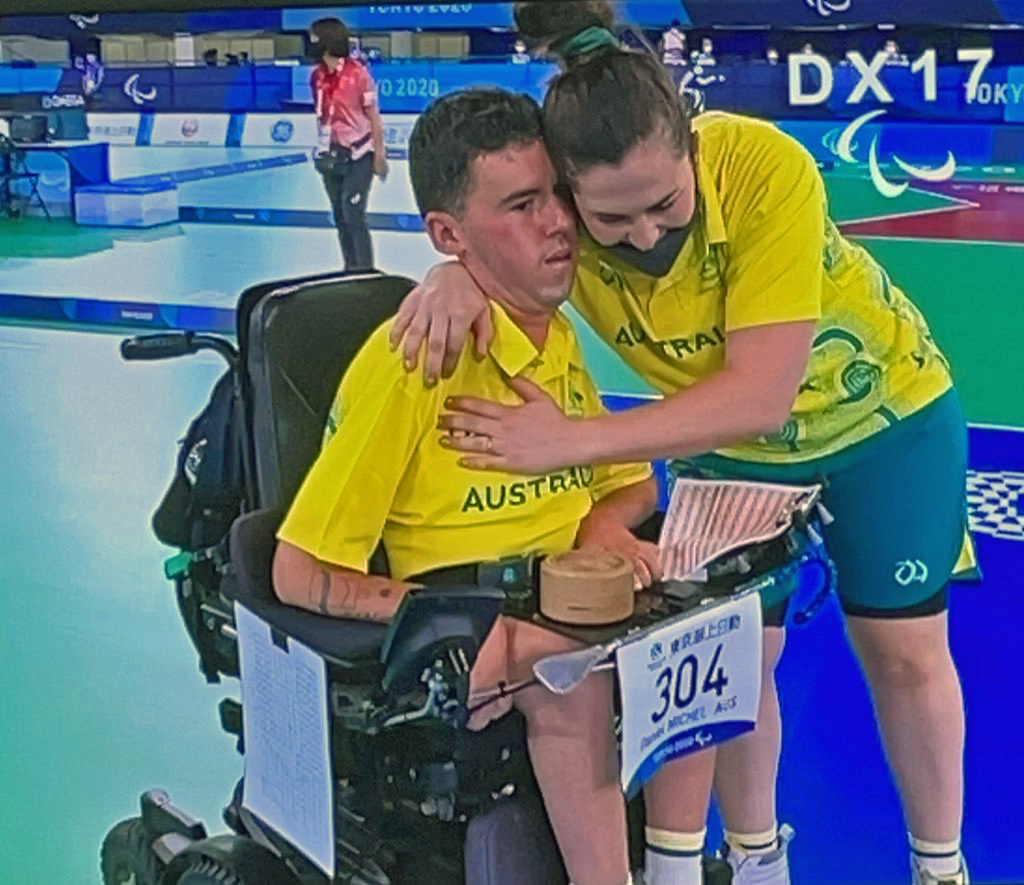
Dan Michel and his ramp assistant Ashlee McClure after Michel won the bronze medal match at the Tokyo 2020 Paralympic Games.

Michel on his Rio Paralympics selection stated"

I'm hoping it's going to have a huge impact on the sport and on the reputation and perception of people with severe disabilities. The overriding public perception surrounding severe disabilities is that people living with these disabilities aren't really capable of succeeding in a sporting atmosphere. There's an emphasis on being successful through academia, but sport is never really promoted as an avenue through which people with severe physical disabilities can achieve enjoyment and also success.

At the Rio Games, Michel won his first pool match in the Mixed individual BC3 but lost his second and did not advance.

Michel won the bronze medal in the Individual BC3 at the 2018 World Championships, Liverpool, England. He teamed with Spencer Cotie and Cal Simpson to win the silver medal in Mixed Pairs BC3.

As of February 2020, Michel is a 4 × World Open champion and has a world ranking of 4.

At the 2020 Tokyo Paralympics, Michel won two of his three Pool Matches and qualified for the Quarterfinals. Here he beat Hansoo Kim of Korea 8–0. In the semifinals he lost to Adam Peska of the Czech Republic 3–4. Michel went on to beat Scott McCowan of Great Britain 6–1 in the bronze medal playoff. By doing so, Michel won Australia's first individual medal for boccia by winning the bronze medal in the Mixed BC3. Australia's previous boccia medal was in the Pairs C1 at the 1996 Atlanta Paralympics. He teamed with Spencer Cotie and Jamieson Leeson in the Mixed Pairs BC3, where they won 2 and lost 2 matches but failed to qualify for the quarter-finals. His ramp assistant was Ashlee McClure.

Michel won the two gold medals at the 2022 World Championships in Rio de Janeiro - Men's BC3 and Mixed Pairs BC3 with Jamieson Leeson. He defeated José Gonçalves 5–1 in the final of the Men's BC3.

He competed at the 2024 Summer Paralympics in Paris with his ramp assistant Ash Maddern. He won silver medal in the Men's BC3, Australia's best ever performance in boccia. Michel and Jamieson Leeson lost in the Mixed pairs BC3 quarter-finals.

== Recognition ==
In 2023, Michel with Jamieson Leeson was awarded the Sport NSW Team of the Year with a Disability, and Australian Institute of Sport Performance Awards Team of the Year.
