= Grigorios Polychronidis =

Greek Paralympic boccia player (born 1981)

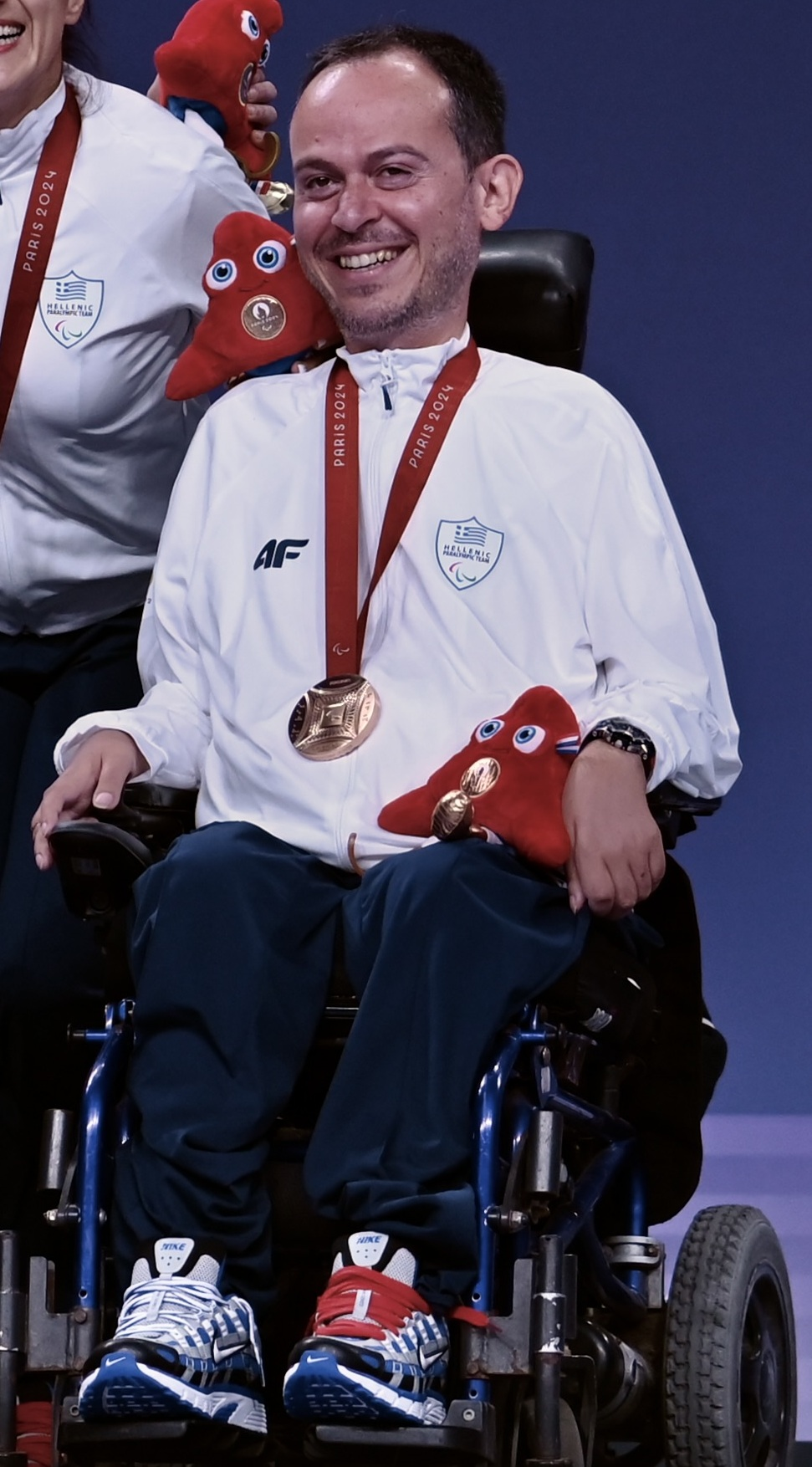
- Polychronidis at the 2024 Summer Paralympics

Personal information
- Nationality: Hellenic
- Born: 13 August 1981 (age 44) Batumi
- Website: www.grigorispolychronidis.com

Sport
- Sport: Boccia
Medal record
Boccia
Representing Greece
Paralympic Games
Gold medal – first place	2012 London	Mixed Pairs BC3
Silver medal – second place	2008 Beijing	Mixed individual BC3
Silver medal – second place	2016 Rio de Janeiro	Mixed Individual BC3
Silver medal – second place	2020 Tokyo	Mixed Individual BC3
Bronze medal – third place	2016 Rio de Janeiro	Mixed Pairs BC3
Bronze medal – third place	2020 Tokyo	Mixed Pairs BC3
Bronze medal – third place	2024 Paris	Men's individual BC3

Grigorios Polychronidis (Greek: Γρηγόρης Πολυχρονίδης, born 13 August 1981) is a Greek Boccia player with a Paralympic Boccia classification of BC3. His specific disability is Spinal Muscular Atrophy.

He has been ranked as the world No. 1 in Mixed Individual BC3 for 349 weeks, including a record 175 consecutive weeks, across a record 8 different years, and finished as the year-end No. 1 a record six times (2007, 2008, 2009, 2018, 2019, 2020). Additionally, he has been ranked as the world No. 1 in Mixed Pairs BC3 for 309 weeks, including 161 consecutive weeks, across 8 different years, and finished as the year-end No. 1 six times (2011, 2012, 2013, 2018, 2019, 2020).

He won 7 Paralympic Medals (Gold in Mixed Pairs BC3 in 2012 Summer Paralympics in London, Silver in Mixed Individual BC3 & Bronze in Mixed Pairs BC3 in 2020 Summer Paralympics in Tokyo, Silver in Mixed Individual BC3 & Bronze in Mixed Pairs BC3 in 2016 Summer Paralympics in Rio de Janeiro, Silver in Mixed Individual BC3 in 2008 Summer Paralympics in Beijing, Bronze in Mixed Individual BC3 in 2024 Summer Paralympics in Paris). He also competed in the 2004 Summer Paralympics in Athens and won the 6th place in Mixed Individual BC3.

At the 2016 Summer Paralympics in Rio de Janeiro, he was the flag bearer of the Hellenic Paralympic Team in Opening ceremony.

In total, he has won 50 medals in official international Boccia competitions and 21 Greek Championships.

== Early life ==
Polychronidis was born on 13 August 1981 in Batumi, Georgia. He is the second child of Daniil Polychronidis and Eleni Polychronidou. He has an older sister named Maria.

He is suffering from spinal muscular atrophy since the day he was born, a disease that prevents muscle development, resulting in very limited and weak movement in my limbs.

In September 1989, his family realized his grandfather's dream of returning to their homeland, Greece.

They reside in Athens, where he finished school in 2001, earning high marks. In the same year, after examinations, he entered the Department of Accounting and Finance at the Athens University of Economics and Business, which was his first choice because it aligned with his professional goals. He is a state employee in the Hellenic Court of Audit.

He has a strong command of English (Cambridge Proficiency in English) and Russian (degree of superior level in the Russian language).

He started training Boccia in 2001 in Peristeri, and won his first national championship in his debut in 2002. His first international appearance was at the 2003 Boccia World Cup. His first participation in the Paralympic Games was at the 2004 Athens Paralympic Games.

== Boccia career ==
=== Paralympic Medals ===
Gold medal in Paralympic Games London 2012, in Pairs BC3

Silver medal in Paralympic Games Tokyo 2020, in Individuals BC3

Silver medal in Paralympic Games Rio 2016, in Individuals BC3

Silver medal in Paralympic Games Beijing 2008, in Individuals BC3

Bronze medal in Paralympic Games Paris 2024, in Individuals BC3

Bronze medal in Paralympic Games Tokyo 2020, in Pairs BC3

Bronze medal in Paralympic Games Rio 2016, in Pairs BC3

6th place in Paralympic Games Athens 2004, in Individuals BC3

=== World Medals ===
Gold medal in World Championships 2018, in Individuals BC3

Gold medal in World Championships 2018, in Pairs BC3

Gold medal in World Open (Povoa) 2018, in Individuals BC3

Gold medal in World Open (Povoa) 2018, in Pairs BC3

Gold medal in World Open (Dubai) 2018, in Pairs BC3

Gold medal in World Open (Seville) 2017, in Individuals BC3

Gold medal in World Open (Poznan) 2015, in Individuals BC3

Gold medal in World Cup 2011, in Pairs BC3

Gold medal in Intercontinental Challenger 2023, in Individuals BC3

Gold medal in Intercontinental Challenger 2023, in Pairs BC3

Gold medal in London 2012 Test Event, in Individuals BC3

Gold medal in Riverland Cup 2008, in Pairs BC3

Silver medal in World Championship 2006, in Individuals BC3

Silver medal in Intercontinental Challenger 2022, in Individuals BC3

Silver medal in World Open (Poznan) 2015, in Pairs BC3

Silver medal in World Open (Povoa) 2014, in Individuals BC3

Silver medal in World Cup 2007, in Individuals BC3

Silver medal in London 2012 Test Event, in Pairs BC3

Silver medal in Athens 2004 Test Event, in Individuals BC3

Bronze medal in Paralympic Qualifier 2024, in Pairs BC3

Bronze medal in World Cup (Povoa) 2024, in Individuals BC3

Bronze medal in World Cup (Povoa) 2024, in Pairs BC3

Bronze medal in World Cup (Povoa) 2023, in Individuals BC3

Bronze medal in World Cup (Montrel) 2023, in Individuals BC3

Bronze medal in World Cup (Montrel) 2023, in Pairs BC3

Bronze medal in World Open (Kansas) 2017, in Individuals BC3

Bronze medal in Defi Sportif 2006, in Individuals BC3

=== Regional (European) Medals ===
Gold medal in European Championship 2023, in Individuals BC3

Gold medal in European Championship 2021, in Individuals BC3

Gold medal in European Championship 2021, in Pairs BC3

Gold medal in European Championship 2019, in Individuals BC3

Gold medal in European Championship 2009, in Individuals BC3

Gold medal in European Open (Madrid) 2018, in Individuals BC3

Gold medal in European Continental Cup 2015, in Pairs BC3

Gold medal in Europa Cup 2011, in Individuals BC3

Silver medal in European Championship 2019, in Pairs BC3

Silver medal in European Championship 2013, in Individuals BC3

Silver medal in European Championship 2013, in Pairs BC3

Bronze medal in European Championship 2023, in Pairs BC3

Bronze medal in European Championship 2017, in Individuals BC3

Bronze medal in European Championship 2015, in Pairs BC3

Bronze medal in European Championship 2009, in Pairs BC3

Bronze medal in European Open (Nymburg) 2019, in Individuals BC3

Bronze medal in European Open (Nymburg) 2019, in Pairs BC3

=== National (Greek) Champion titles ===
21 Times Greek Champion (2002-2019, 2022-2024), in Individuals BC3

15 Times Greek Champion (2003, 2006-2016, 2019, 2022, 2023), in Pairs BC3

== Off the court ==
=== Social Activity ===
- Member of the International Paralympic Committee Athletes’ Council (2023 – present)
- Treasurer of the Hellenic Paralympic Committee (2013 – 2017)
- President of the Hellenic Paralympic Winners Association (2019 – present)
- Vice President of the Hellenic Paralympic Winners Association (2013 – 2015)
- Member of the World Boccia Competition & Rules Committee (2015 – present)
- Member of the World Boccia Athletes Committee (2022 – present)
- Ambassador of the International Olympic Truce Center (2020 - present)
- Ambassador of the MDA Hellas (2012 – present)
- President of the Eidiki Olympiada of Greece Sports Club (2025 – present)
- President of the St. Christopher’s Sports Club (2001 – 2005)

=== Achievements in Film Industry ===
- “My way to Olympia” (2013)

Film that I protagonist. World premiere in Berlinale 2013 World Film Festival.

Awarded as BCN Sports film 2014 and by EOP Festival 2013.

Shown in cinemas and on TV in many countries (Germany, Russia, China, etc.).

- “Rising Phoenix Tokyo” (2024)

TV series that I protagonist, showing the journey to the Tokyo Paralympic Games.

- “Champions of Life” (2004)

Film that I protagonist. World premiere in Athens 2004.

=== Awards ===
- Awarded with the Gold Medal of the Hellenic Parliament in 2008, 2012 and 2024
- Awarded with the Silver Medal of the Hellenic Parliament in 2004
- Declared twice as an Honorary Citizen of the City of Athens (2004, 2021) and Awarded with the Medal of the City of Athens
- Awarded by the President of the Hellenic Republic in 2004, 2008, 2012, 2016, 2021 and 2024
- Awarded by the Prime Minister of Greece in 2004, 2016, 2021 and 2024
- Awarded by the Undersecretary of Sports in 2004, 2008, 2012, 2015 and 2016
- Awarded by the Archbishop of Athens and Greece in 2004
- Awarded by the Greek Association of Sports Journalism (PSAT) in 2015, 2016, 2018 and 2021, as the Best Team of the Year in the Sports for Persons with Disabilities
- Nominated for the Laureus World Sportsperson of the Year with a Disability 2018 Award
- Named August Allianz Athlete of the Month – August 2018

=== Sponsorships and endorsements ===
Polychronidis is sponsored by the insurance brand, Allianz and Alpha Bank.

His other supporters include Peristeri City, Anaplasi Rehabilitation Center, Hellenic Electricity Distribution Network Operator SA, Dimou Chiropractor and Stelios Philanthropic Foundation.

== Personal life ==
=== Family and children ===
Polychronidis is married to his ramp operator Katerina Patroni, whom he met after the 2012 Summer Paralympics. They started competing together in 2015. They were married at Grand Resort Lagonisi, near Athens, on 25th August 2017, surrounded by a small group of close friends and family. In 2021, she gave birth to a girl that was baptized Valentina in a Christian Orthodox church.
