= BC3 =

Boccia classification

BC3 is a boccia classification. The class is open to people with several different types of disabilities, including cerebral palsy. BC3 players have events open to them in boccia on the Paralympic Games program.

== Definition ==
In 2008, BBC Sport defined this classification was "BC3: For players with a very severe physical disability. Players use an assistive device and may be assisted by a person, who will remain in the player's box but who must keep his/her back to the court and eyes averted from play" In 2008, the Australian Broadcasting Corporation defined this classification was "BC3: This category is for players with a very severe physical disability. Players use a device to assist them and also can be helped by a nominated person at the court. However the assistant must keep his/her back to the court, so they cannot give advice on where to throw or kick the next ball to get it closest to the jack." In 2012, the Cerebral Palsy International Sports and Recreation Association defined this classification as: "BC 3 – These athletes are also unable to hold and release a ball. These athletes may use a ramp and an assistant ." In 2012, the Great Britain Boccia Federation defined this classification as: "Players with Cerebral Palsy or other disability with locomotor dysfunction in all four limbs who are unable to throw or kick a ball into play and as such are permitted to use an assistive device such as a ramp to propel the ball into play and are supported by an assistant ('ramper')."

== Disability groups ==
One of the disability groups in this classification is boccia with cerebral palsy, including CP-ISRA CP1 classified players. CP1 competitors are classified as either BC1 or BC3. BC3 players cannot throw the ball themselves, require the use of an electric wheelchair and use a ramp to propel the ball. CP1 sportspeople tend to use electric wheelchairs. They may have controlled shakes and twitches. They have severely limited of their trunk and limbs. When participating in sport, CP1 competitors tend to have low energy expenditure. This bodily activity can spike their metabolic rate. CP1 competitors have worse upper body control when compared to CP2.

== Competition rules and organization ==
Events this classification competes in are mixed gendered competitions for either single players or a pair of players. Players in this classification have six minutes to play an end. Players in this classification have eight minutes to play an end during team play.

== Classification and sport history ==
Boccia made its debut on the Paralympic program at the 1984 Games. Boccia began to develop as an important sport for people in this class as track events began to disappear. The timing of this matched with a push by the CP-ISRA to promote the sport.

== Competition information and results ==
At the 2012 Australian national championships held at the Sydney Sport & Recreation from 30 April to 3 May, the BC3 individual event was won by Angie McReynolds of New South Wales, with second place going to Terry Cooper of New South Wales and third place going to Sheila Thomas of New South Wales.

=== At the Paralympic Games ===
At the 2012 Summer Paralympics, this classification competed in a six end individual event, and a pairs event with four balls per each end in a four end game. Great Britain's performances in this classification meant their talent identification unit for sport performance focuses specifically on improving it as one of the best opportunities for medals at the 2012 London Games.

For the 2016 Summer Paralympics in Rio, the International Paralympic Committee had a zero classification at the Games policy. This policy was put into place in 2014, with the goal of avoiding last minute changes in classes that would negatively impact athlete training preparations. All competitors needed to be internationally classified with their classification status confirmed prior to the Games, with exceptions to this policy being dealt with on a case-by-case basis. In case there was a need for classification or reclassification at the Games despite best efforts otherwise, boccia classification was scheduled for September 8 at Carioca Arena 2.

== Becoming classified ==
Classification is handled by Cerebral Palsy International Sports and Recreation Association. The classification officer for the Cerebral Palsy International Sports and Recreation Association is Joan Steele-Mills.

To be eligible for classification, a boccia competitor "must have a diagnosis of cerebral palsy, stroke, head injury or other nonprogressive brain damage with locomotor dysfunction, either congenital or acquired (exception: Boccia “BC 4” players)."

== Competitors ==
Competitors in this classification include Jessica Hunter who has represented both England and Great Britain, and Jacob Thomas who has represented both Wales and Great Britain.
