= Azerbaijan at the 2008 Summer Paralympics =

- IPC code: AZE
- NPC: National Paralympic Committee of Azerbaijan
- Website: www.paralympic.az

in Beijing
- Competitors: 18 in 4 sports
- Flag bearer: Ilham Zakiyev
- Medals Ranked 38th: Gold 2 Silver 3 Bronze 5 Total 10

Summer Paralympics appearances (overview)
- 1996; 2000; 2004; 2008; 2012; 2016; 2020; 2024

Other related appearances
- Soviet Union (1988); Unified Team (1992)

Azerbaijan competed at the 2008 Summer Paralympics in Beijing, China. The country's delegation consisted of eighteen competitors in four sports: judo, athletics, powerlifting, and shooting.

Before the games, President Ilham Aliyev announced cash prizes for Azerbaijanis who won a Paralympic medal. Gold medalists received 200,000 manat, silver medalists 100,000, and bronze medalists 50,000. The athletes' trainers also received a reward: 100,000, 50,000, and 25,000 manat for gold, silver, and bronze medals, respectively.

== Medalists ==
Medal	Name	Sport	Event	Date
Gold	Ilham Zakiyev	Judo	Men +100 kg	9 September
Gold	Olokhan Musayev	Athletics	Men's Shot Put - F55/56	15 September
Silver	Tofig Mammadov	Judo	Men -90 kg	9 September
Silver	Karim Sardarov	Judo	Men -100 kg	9 September
Silver	Zeynidin Bilalov	Athletics	Men's triple jump - F11	12 September
Bronze	Ramin Ibrahimov	Judo	Men -60 kg	7 September
Bronze	Vladimir Zayets	Athletics	Men's triple jump - F12	8 September
Bronze	Oleg Panyutin	Athletics	Men's long jump - F12	13 September
Bronze	Rza Osmanov	Athletics	Men's 400m - T12	13 September
Bronze	Vugar Mehdiyev	Athletics	Men's 200m - T13	16 September

== Sports ==
=== Athletics ===
==== Men's track ====
Athlete	Class	Event	Heats		Semifinal		Final	
Athlete	Class	Event	Result	Rank	Result	Rank	Result	Rank
Vugar Mehdiyev	T13	100m	11.14	4 Q	—		11.01	4
Vugar Mehdiyev	T13	200m	22.19	5 Q	—		22.00	3rd place, bronze medalist(s)
Elchin Muradov	T12	100m	11.35	9 Q	11.22	8 B	11.19	6
Elchin Muradov	T12	200m	23.38	14	did not advance			
Reza Osmanov	T12	400m	51.03	6 Q	50.87	3 q	50.20	3rd place, bronze medalist(s)
Zynidin Bilalov; Vugar Mehdiyev; Elchin Muradov; Reza Osmanov	T11-13	4x100m relay	—				DNF	

==== Men's field ====
Athlete	Class	Event	Final		
Athlete	Class	Event	Result	Points	Rank
Zeynidin Bilalov	F11	Triple jump	12.80	-	2nd place, silver medalist(s)
Olokhan Musayev	F55-56	Shot put	13.49 WR	1162	1st place, gold medalist(s)
Oleg Panyutin	F12	Long jump	7.06	-	3rd place, bronze medalist(s)
Vladimir Zayets	F12	Long jump	6.81	-	4
Vladimir Zayets	F12	Triple jump	15.00	-	3rd place, bronze medalist(s)

=== Judo ===
==== Men ====
Athlete	Event	Round of 16	Quarterfinals	Semifinals	Repechage 1	Repechage 2	Final / BM	
Athlete	Event	Opposition Result	Opposition Result	Opposition Result	Opposition Result	Opposition Result	Opposition Result	Rank
Ramin Ibrahimov	−60 kg	Zasyadkovych (UKR); W 1000-0000	Shakhmanov (RUS); W 1000-0000	Noura (ALG); L 0001–1000s1	Bye		Quilter (GBR); W 1000–0000	3rd place, bronze medalist(s)
Ilkin Alishov	−66 kg	Amaral (BRA); W 0001-0000s1	Lamri (ALG); L 0001s2-0010s1	did not advance		Karpeniuk (UKR); L 0000s1-0101	did not advance	7
Ramin Aliyev	−73 kg	Kimura (JPN); W 1001-0000	Xu Z (CHN); L 0000s1-1001	did not advance		Krieger (GER); L 0011s2-0110s1	did not advance	7
Natig Novruzzade	−81 kg	Gonzalez (ESP); W 1000-0000	Lencina (ARG); L 0000-1000	did not advance		Oga (JPN); L refuse to race	did not advance	7
Tofig Mammadov	−90 kg	Stoskus (LTU); W 0211-0000s1	Junk (GER); W 0003s1-0001s1	Sevricourt (FRA); W 1100s1-0001	Bye		Kretsul (RUS); L 0010s3–0100s2	2nd place, silver medalist(s)
Karim Sardarov	−100 kg	Bye	Hirose (JPN); W 1001s1–0001s1	Cortada (CUB); W 1000–0000	Bye		Tenorio Silva (BRA); L 0000s3–1101	2nd place, silver medalist(s)
Ilham Zakiyev	+100 kg	Bye	Taurines (FRA); W 1000–0000	Park (KOR); W 1000–0001	Bye		Wang S (CHN); W 1000–0000	1st place, gold medalist(s)

=== Powerlifting ===
Athlete	Event	Result	Rank
Maharram Aliyev	+100kg	205.0	7
Elshan Huseynov	90kg	190.0	5
Mehman Ramazanzade	100kg	190.0	8

=== Shooting ===
Athlete	Event	Qualification		Final		
Athlete	Event	Score	Rank	Score	Total	Rank
Yelena Taranova	Mixed 25m pistol SH1	527	25	did not advance		
Yelena Taranova	Mixed 50m pistol SH1	517	16	did not advance		
Yelena Taranova	Women's 10m air pistol SH1	364	8 Q	96.1	460.1	6

== See also ==
- Azerbaijan at the Paralympics
- Azerbaijan at the 2008 Summer Olympics
