= Azerbaijan at the 2012 Summer Paralympics =

- IPC code: AZE
- NPC: National Paralympic Committee of Azerbaijan
- Website: www.paralympic.az

in London
- Competitors: 21 in 6 sports
- Flag bearer: Ilham Zakiyev
- Medals Ranked 27th: Gold 4 Silver 5 Bronze 3 Total 12

Summer Paralympics appearances (overview)
- 1996; 2000; 2004; 2008; 2012; 2016; 2020; 2024

Other related appearances
- Soviet Union (1988); Unified Team (1992)

Azerbaijan competed at the 2012 Summer Paralympics in London, England, from August 29 to September 9, 2012.

== Medallists ==
Medal	Name	Sport	Event	Date
Gold	Ramin Ibrahimov	Judo	Men's -60kg	30 August
Gold	Afag Sultanova	Judo	Women's -57kg	31 August
Gold	Oleg Panyutin	Athletics	Men's triple jump F12	8 September
Gold	Natali Pronina	Swimming	Women's 100m Breaststroke SB12	8 September
Silver	Natali Pronina	Swimming	Women's 200m Individual Medley SM12	3 September
Silver	Natali Pronina	Swimming	Women's 100m Freestyle S12	4 September
Silver	Natali Pronina	Swimming	Women's 100m Backstroke S12	5 September
Silver	Natali Pronina	Swimming	Women's 50m Freestyle S12	7 September
Silver	Vladimir Zayets	Athletics	Men's triple jump F12	8 September
Bronze	Ilham Zakiyev	Judo	Men's +100kg	1 September
Bronze	Huseyn Hasanov	Athletics	Men's Long Jump F46	3 September
Bronze	Elchin Muradov; Rza Osmanov; Oleg Panyutin; Vladimir Zayets	Athletics	Men's 4 × 100 m Relay T11-13	5 September

== Archery ==
Women

Athlete	Event	Ranking round		Round of 32	Round of 16	Quarterfinals	Semifinals	Finals	
Athlete	Event	Score	Seed	Opposition score	Opposition score	Opposition score	Opposition score	Opposition score	Rank
Zinyat Valiyeva	Ind. recurve W1/W2	435	19	Sidkova (CZE) (14); L 0-6	did not advance				

== Athletics ==
Men

Athlete	Event	Heat		Semifinal		Final	
Athlete	Event	Result	Rank	Result	Rank	Result	Rank
Olokhan Musayev	Shot put F56	—N/a				11.93 (913 pts)	9
Olokhan Musayev	Discus throw F56	—N/a				41.77 (974 pts)	4
Huseyn Hasanov	Triple jump F46	—N/a				13.74	4
Huseyn Hasanov	Long jump F46	—N/a				6.53	3rd place, bronze medalist(s)
Oleg Panyutin	Triple jump F12	—N/a				15.02	1st place, gold medalist(s)
Vladimir Zayets	Triple jump F12	—N/a				15.01	2nd place, silver medalist(s)
Rza Osmanov	Men's 200 metres T12	22.85	3 q	23.11	4	did not advance	
Rza Osmanov	Men's 400 metres T12	51.46	2 q	51.34	3	did not advance	
Elchin Muradov	Men's 100 metres T11	49.78	4	did not advance			
Elchin Muradov	Men's 200 metres T11	23.49	1 Q	23.41	2	did not advance	
Samir Nabiyev	Discus throw 57/58	—N/a				44.78 (906 pts)	5
Elchin Muradov; Rza Osmanov; Oleg Panyutin; Vladimir Zayets	Relay T11-13	44.12	1 Q	—N/a		43.92	3rd place, bronze medalist(s)

Women

Athlete	Event	Final	
Athlete	Event	Result	Rank
Madinat Abdullayeva	Shot put F57	NM	
Madinat Abdullayeva	Discus throw F57	19.21 (501 pts)	14

== Judo ==
Men

Athlete	Event	Round of 16	Quarterfinals	Semifinals	First Repechage Round	Repechage Semifinals	Final	
Athlete	Event	Opposition Result	Opposition Result	Opposition Result	Opposition Result	Opposition Result	Opposition Result	Rank
Ramin Ibrahimov	-60 kg	Lee (KOR); W 1010-0000	Villemont (FRA); W 0200-0001	Hirai (JPN); W 0201-0000	—N/a		Li (CHN); W 1011-000	1st place, gold medalist(s)
Bayram Mustafayev	-66 kg	Rudenko (RUS); W 0031–0002	Zhao (CHN); L 0002–0010	Did not advance	Lamri (ALG); L 0002–1021	did not advance		
Rovshan Safarov	-81 kg	Alonso (CUB); L 0000–0201	did not advance					
Tofig Mamedov	-90 kg	Santos (BRA); L 0002–0010	did not advance					
Karim Sardarov	-100 kg	Upmann (GER); L 0000–1000	did not advance					
Ilham Zakiyev	+100 kg	Gaydarov (RUS); W 1000–0000	Masaki (JPN); L 0000–1000	Did not advance	BYE	Walby (CAN); W 1000–0001	Silva (BRA); W 0201–0000	3rd place, bronze medalist(s)

Women

Athlete	Event	Quarterfinals	Semifinals	Repechage Semifinals	Final	
Athlete	Event	Opposition Result	Opposition Result	Opposition Result	Opposition Result	Rank
Afag Sultanova	-57 kg	Coadou (FRA); W 1000–0000	Cete (TUR); W 0020–0001	—N/a	Teixeira (BRA); W 1000–0000	1st place, gold medalist(s)

== Powerlifting ==
Men

Athlete	Event	Result	Rank
Elshan Huseynov	100 kg	230	4
Maharram Aliyev	+100 kg	230	5

== Shooting ==
Men

Athlete	Event	Qualification		Final	
Athlete	Event	Score	Rank	Score	Rank
Akbar Muradov	10m Air Pistol SH1	554	21	did not advance	
Akbar Muradov	25m Pistol SH1	549	16	did not advance	
Akbar Muradov	50m Pistol SH1	515	18	did not advance	

Women

Athlete	Event	Qualification		Final	
Athlete	Event	Score	Rank	Score	Rank
Yelena Taranova	10m Air Pistol SH1	372	5	465.9	7
Yelena Taranova	25m Pistol SH1	DNS		did not advance	
Yelena Taranova	50m Pistol SH1	513	20	did not advance	

== Swimming ==
Women

Athletes	Event	Heat		Final	
Athletes	Event	Time	Position	Time	Position
Natali Pronina	50 m freestyle S12	28.10	2 Q	27.54	2nd place, silver medalist(s)
Natali Pronina	100 m freestyle S12	1:04.97	6 Q	1:00.00	2nd place, silver medalist(s)
Natali Pronina	400 m freestyle S12	4:58.06	6 Q	4:53.40	5
Natali Pronina	100 m breaststroke SB12	1:20.09	2 Q	1:16.17	1st place, gold medalist(s)
Natali Pronina	100 m backstroke S12	1:12.79	2 Q	1:09.46	2nd place, silver medalist(s)
Natali Pronina	200 m individual medley SM12	2:36.75	1 Q	2:28.45	2nd place, silver medalist(s)

== See also ==
- Azerbaijan at the Paralympics
- Azerbaijan at the 2012 Summer Olympics
