= Azerbaijan at the Paralympics =

- IPC code: AZE
- NPC: National Paralympic Committee of Azerbaijan
- Website: www.paralympic.az
- Medals Ranked 44th: Gold 27 Silver 21 Bronze 20 Total 68

Summer appearances
- 1996; 2000; 2004; 2008; 2012; 2016; 2020; 2024

Winter appearances
- 2022; 2026

Other related appearances
- Soviet Union (1988); Unified Team (1992)

Azerbaijan made its Paralympic Games début at the 1996 Summer Paralympics in Atlanta, with a two-man delegation to compete in track and field and powerlifting. It has taken part in every subsequent edition of the Summer Paralympics. The country made its debut at the Winter Paralympics in 2022.

== Medals ==
=== Medals by Summer Games ===
Games	Athletes	Gold	Silver	Bronze	Total	Rank
(Italy) Rome 1960	did not participate					
(Japan) Tokyo 1964	did not participate					
(Israel) Tel Aviv 1968	did not participate					
(Germany) Heidelberg 1972	did not participate					
(Canada) Toronto 1976	did not participate					
(Netherlands) Arnhem 1980	did not participate					
(United States) New York 1984	did not participate					
(South Korea) Seoul 1988	did not participate					
(Spain) Barcelona 1992	did not participate					
(United States) Atlanta 1996	2	0	0	0	0	-
(Australia) Sydney 2000	7	0	1	0	1	60
(Greece) Athens 2004	9	2	1	1	4	45
(China) Beijing 2008	18	2	3	5	10	38
(United Kingdom) London 2012	21	4	5	3	12	27
(Brazil) Rio de Janeiro 2016	25	1	8	2	11	48
(Japan) Tokyo 2020	36	14	1	4	19	10
(France) Paris 2024	18	4	2	5	11	28
Total		27	21	20	68	45

=== Medals by Winter Games ===
Games	Athletes	Gold	Silver	Bronze	Total	Rank
(Sweden) Örnsköldsvik 1976	did not participate					
(Norway) Geilo 1980	did not participate					
(Austria) Innsbruck 1984	did not participate					
(Austria) Innsbruck 1988	did not participate					
(France) Albertville 1992	did not participate					
(Norway) Lillehammer 1994	did not participate					
(Japan) Nagano 1998	did not participate					
(United States) Salt Lake City 2002	did not participate					
(Italy) Turin 2006	did not participate					
(Canada) Vancouver 2010	did not participate					
(Russia) Sochi 2014	did not participate					
(South Korea) Pyeongchang 2018	did not participate					
(China) Beijing 2022	1	0	0	0	0	-
(Italy) Milano Cortina 2026	did not participate					
Total		0	0	0	0	−

=== Medals by Summer Sport ===
Games	Gold	Silver	Bronze	Total
Judo	11	3	6	20
Athletics	10	9	8	27
Swimming	5	8	3	16
Taekwondo	1	0	1	2
Shooting	0	1	1	2
Powerlifting	0	0	1	1
Total	27	21	20	68

=== Medals by Winter Sport ===
Sport	Gold	Silver	Bronze	Total
Totals (0 entries)	0	0	0	0

== Medallists ==
Medal	Name	Games	Sport	Event
Silver	Yelena Taranova	2000 Sydney	Shooting	Mixed free pistol SH1
Gold	Oleg Panyutin	2004 Athens	Athletics	Men's long jump F12
Gold	Ilham Zakiyev	2004 Athens	Judo	Men's +100 kg
Silver	Zeynidin Bilalov	2004 Athens	Athletics	Men's triple jump F11
Bronze	Yelena Taranova	2004 Athens	Shooting	Women's 10m air pistol SH1
Gold	Olokhan Musayev	2008 Beijing	Athletics	Men's shot put F55/56
Gold	Ilham Zakiyev	2008 Beijing	Judo	Men's +100 kg
Silver	Zeynidin Bilalov	2008 Beijing	Athletics	Men's triple jump F11
Silver	Tofig Mammadov	2008 Beijing	Judo	Men's -90 kg
Silver	Karim Sardarov	2008 Beijing	Judo	Men's -100 kg
Bronze	Vladimir Zayets	2008 Beijing	Athletics	Men's triple jump F12
Bronze	Oleg Panyutin	2008 Beijing	Athletics	Men's long jump F12
Bronze	Reza Osmanov	2008 Beijing	Athletics	Men's 400m T12
Bronze	Vugar Mehdiyev	2008 Beijing	Athletics	Men's 200m T13
Bronze	Ramin Ibrahimov	2008 Beijing	Judo	Men's -60 kg
Gold	Oleg Panyutin	2012 London	Athletics	Men's triple jump F12
Gold	Ramin Ibrahimov	2012 London	Judo	Men's -60 kg
Gold	Afag Sultanova	2012 London	Judo	Women's -57 kg
Gold	Natali Pronina	2012 London	Swimming	Women's 100m breaststroke SB12
Silver	Vladimir Zayets	2012 London	Athletics	Men's triple jump F12
Silver	Natali Pronina	2012 London	Swimming	Women's 100m freestyle S12
Silver	Natali Pronina	2012 London	Swimming	Women's 100m backstroke S12
Silver	Natali Pronina	2012 London	Swimming	Women's 50m freestyle S12
Bronze	Huseyn Hasanov	2012 London	Athletics	Men's long jump F46
Bronze	Elchin Muradov; Reza Osmanov; Oleg Panyutin; Vladimir Zayets	2012 London	Athletics	Men's 4 × 100 m relay T11-13
Bronze	Ilham Zakiyev	2012 London	Judo	Men's +100 kg
Gold	Ramil Gasimov	2016 Rio de Janeiro	Judo	Men's -73 kg
Silver	Elena Chebanu	2016 Rio de Janeiro	Athletics	Women's 100m T12
Silver	Kamil Aliyev	2016 Rio de Janeiro	Athletics	Men's long jump F12
Silver	Elena Chebanu	2016 Rio de Janeiro	Athletics	Women's long jump F12
Silver	Irada Aliyeva	2016 Rio de Janeiro	Athletics	Women's javelin throw F12/13
Silver	Bayram Mustafayev	2016 Rio de Janeiro	Judo	Men's -66 kg
Silver	Dzmitry Salei	2016 Rio de Janeiro	Swimming	Men's 100m breaststroke SB12
Silver	Raman Salei	2016 Rio de Janeiro	Swimming	Men's 100m backstroke S12
Silver	Dzmitry Salei	2016 Rio de Janeiro	Swimming	Men's 50m freestyle S12
Bronze	Elena Chebanu	2016 Rio de Janeiro	Athletics	Women's 200m T12
Bronze	Rovshan Safarov	2016 Rio de Janeiro	Judo	Men's -81 kg
Gold	Shahana Hajiyeva	2020 Tokyo	Judo	Women's 48 kg
Gold	Raman Salei	2020 Tokyo	Swimming	Men's 100 metre backstroke S12
Gold	Vugar Shirinli	2020 Tokyo	Judo	Men's 60 kg
Gold	Sevda Valiyeva	2020 Tokyo	Judo	Women's 57 kg
Gold	Khanim Huseynova	2020 Tokyo	Judo	Women's 63 kg
Gold	Huseyn Rahimli	2020 Tokyo	Judo	Men's 81 kg
Gold	Hamed Heidari	2020 Tokyo	Athletics	Men's javelin throw F57
Gold	Elvin Astanov	2020 Tokyo	Athletics	Men's shot put F53
Gold	Dursadaf Karimova	2020 Tokyo	Judo	Women's +70 kg
Gold	Raman Salei	2020 Tokyo	Swimming	Men's 100 metre freestyle S12
Gold	Vali Israfilov	2020 Tokyo	Swimming	Men's 100 m breaststroke SB12
Gold	Raman Salei	2020 Tokyo	Swimming	Men's 100 metre butterfly S12
Gold	Lamiya Valiyeva	2020 Tokyo	Athletics	Women's 400 metres T13
Gold	Orkhan Aslanov	2020 Tokyo	Athletics	Men's long jump T13
Silver	Lamiya Valiyeva	2020 Tokyo	Athletics	Women's 100 metres T13
Bronze	Parvin Mammadov	2020 Tokyo	Powerlifting	Men's 49 kg
Bronze	Namig Abasli	2020 Tokyo	Judo	Men's 66 kg
Bronze	Ilham Zakiyev	2020 Tokyo	Judo	Men's +100 kg
Bronze	Said Najafzade	2020 Tokyo	Athletics	Men's long jump#T12

== See also ==
- Azerbaijan at the Olympics
