= Azerbaijan at the 2016 Summer Paralympics =

- IPC code: AZE
- NPC: National Paralympic Committee of Azerbaijan
- Website: www.paralympic.az

in Rio de Janeiro
- Competitors: 25 in 6 sports
- Flag bearer: Ilham Zakiyev
- Medals Ranked 48th: Gold 1 Silver 8 Bronze 2 Total 11

Summer Paralympics appearances (overview)
- 1996; 2000; 2004; 2008; 2012; 2016; 2020; 2024

Other related appearances
- Soviet Union (1988); Unified Team (1992)

Azerbaijan competed at the 2016 Summer Paralympics in Rio de Janeiro, Brazil, from 7 to 18 September 2016.

== Medalists ==
Medal	Name	Sport	Event	Date
Gold	Ramil Gasimov	Judo	Men's 73 kg	9 September
Silver	Bayram Mustafayev	Judo	Men's 66 kg	8 September
Silver	Elena Chebanu	Athletics	Women's 100 metres	9 September
Silver	Kamil Aliyev	Athletics	Men's Long jump - T12	10 September
Silver	Elena Chebanu	Athletics	Women's Long Jump - T12	13 September
Silver	Dzmitry Salei	Swimming	Men's 100m Breaststroke - SB12	13 September
Silver	Raman Salei	Swimming	Men's 100m Backstroke - S12	15 September
Silver	Dzmitry Salei	Swimming	Men's 50m Freestyle - S12	17 September
Silver	Irada Aliyeva	Athletics	Women's Javelin Throw - F12/13	17 September
Bronze	Elena Chebanu	Athletics	Women's 200 metres - T12	12 September
Bronze	Rovshan Safarov	Judo	Men's 81 kg	9 September

== Delegation ==
The country sent a team of 25 athletes, 20 men and 5 women, along with 2 officials to the 2016 Summer Paralympics.

== Competitors ==
Sport	Men	Women	Total
Archery	0	1	1
Athletics	10	2	12
Judo	6	1	7
Powerlifting	2	0	2
Shooting	0	1	1
Swimming	2	0	2
Total	20	5	25

== Archery ==
Women

Athlete	Event	Ranking round		Round of 32	Round of 16	Quarterfinals	Semifinals	Finals	
Athlete	Event	Score	Seed	Opposition score	Opposition score	Opposition score	Opposition score	Opposition score	Rank
Zinyat Valiyeva	Individual recurve open	472	31	Nemati (IRI); L 0-6	Did not advance				17

== Athletics (track and field) ==
Men's Track

Athlete	Guide	Events	Heat		Semifinal		Final	
Athlete	Guide	Events	Time	Rank	Time	Rank	Time	Rank
Elchin Muradov	Hakim Ibrahimov	100m - T11	Disqualified					
Elmir Jabrayilov	-	100m - T12	11.27	2 Q	—N/a		11.5	4
Elmir Jabrayilov	-	200m - T12	Did not start					
Elmir Jabrayilov	Hakim Ibrahimov	400m - T12	49.74	3 Q	50.17	3	Did not advance	
Oleg Panyutin; Kamil Aliyev; Elmir Jabrayilov; Elchin Muradov	Hakim Ibrahimov	4 × 100 m Relay T11-13	Did not start					

Men's Field

Athlete	Event	Mark(metr)	Rank
Samir Nabiyev	Shot Put - F56/57	13.67	7
Rufat Rafiyev	Shot Put - F36	13.72	4
Elchin Muradov	Long Jump - T11	6.09	5
Kamil Aliyev	Long Jump - T12	7.05	2nd place, silver medalist(s)
Oleg Panyutin	Long Jump - T12	6.88	7
Huseyn Hasanov	Long Jump - T45/46/47	Did not start	
Olokhan Musayev	Discus Throw - F54/55/56	40.93	4

Women's

Javelin Throw

Athlete	Event	Mark(metr)	Rank
Irada Aliyeva	Javelin Throw - F12/13	42.58	2nd place, silver medalist(s)

Track events

Athlete	Guide	Events	Heat		Semi-final		Final	
Athlete	Guide	Events	Time	Rank	Time	Rank	Time	Rank
Elena Chebanu	Hakim Ibrahimov	100m - T12	12.24	1 Q	11.81	1 Q	11.71	2nd place, silver medalist(s)
Elena Chebanu	Hakim Ibrahimov	200m - T12	24.16	1 Q	—N/a		23.80	3rd place, bronze medalist(s)
Elena Chebanu	Hakim Ibrahimov	400m - T12	56.53	2	Did not advance			
Elena Chebanu	-	Long Jump - T12	—N/a				5.56	2nd place, silver medalist(s)

Key

- Note–Ranks given for track events are within the athlete's heat only
- DSQ = Disqualified
- DNS = Did not start
- DNF = Did not finish
- Q = Qualified for the next round
- q = Qualified for the next round as a fastest loser
- WR = World record
- PR = Paralympic record
- RR = Regional record
- NR = National record
- N/A = Round not applicable for the event
- Bye = Athlete not required to compete in round

== Judo ==
With one pathway for qualification being having a top finish at the 2014 IBSA Judo World Championships, Azerbaijan earned a qualifying spot in Rio base on the performance of Bayram Mustafayev in the men's -66 kg event. The B3 Judoka finished first in his class. Ramil Gasimov gave his country a second spot after the B2 judoka won the men's -73kg class.

Men

Athlete	Event	Round of 16	Quarterfinals	Semifinals	Repechage 1	Repechage 2	Final / BM	
Athlete	Event	Opposition Result	Opposition Result	Opposition Result	Opposition Result	Opposition Result	Opposition Result	Rank
Ramin Ibrahimov	−60 kg	Gauto (ARG); W 112-000	Sariyev (KAZ); W 100–002	Namozov (UZB); L 000–100	Bye		Bolormaa (MGL); L 000–100	5
Bayram Mustafayev	−66 kg	Bye	Oliveira Boto (BRA); W 010–000	Fujimoto (JPN); W 100–000	Bye		Nigmatov (UZB); L 000–110	2nd place, silver medalist(s)
Ramil Gasimov	−73 kg	Bye	Rodriguez (CUB); W 000–000 S	Kornhass (GER); W 100–000	Bye		Solovey (UKR); W 110–000	1st place, gold medalist(s)
Rovshan Safarov	−81 kg	Kazlou (BLR); W 110–000	Kosinov (UKR); L 000–110	Did not advance		Effron (ARG); W 100–000	Drane (GBR); W 102–000	3rd place, bronze medalist(s)
Kanan Abdullakhanli	−100 kg	Pominov (UKR); W 101–000	Choi (KOR); L 000–101	Did not advance		Alizadeh (IRI); W 000–000 S	Sharipov (UZB); L 000–001	5
Ilham Zakiyev	+100 kg	Bye	Tuledibaev (UZB); L 000–100	Did not advance	Goodrich (USA); W 102–000	Hodgson (GBR); W 001–000	Jimenez (CUB); L 000–001	5

Women

Athlete	Event	Quarterfinals	Semifinals	Repechage	Final / BM	
Athlete	Event	Opposition Result	Opposition Result	Opposition Result	Opposition Result	Rank
Sabina Abdullayeva	−57 kg	Hirose (JPN); L 000–100	Did not advance	Wang (CHN); L 000–100	Did not advance	7

== Powerlifting ==
Athlete	Event	Total lifted	Rank
Ahmad Razm Azar	Men's –65 kg	No marks recorded	
Elshan Huseynov	Men's –107 kg	No marks recorded	

== Shooting ==
Athlete	Event	Qualification		Final	
Athlete	Event	Score	Rank	Score	Rank
Yelena Taranova	Women's P2-10m Air Pistol - SH1	370-4x	5 Q	148.8	4
Yelena Taranova	Mixed P3-25m Pistol - SH1	560-11x	13	Did not advance	
Yelena Taranova	Mixed P3-25m Pistol - SH1	503-2x	27	Did not advance	

== Swimming ==
=== Men ===
Athletes	Event	Heat		Final	
Athletes	Event	Time	Rank	Time	Rank
Dzmitry Salei	50 m freestyle S12	24.40	1 Q	24.29	2nd place, silver medalist(s)
Raman Salei	50 m freestyle S12	24.43	2 Q	24.45	4
Dzmitry Salei	100 m freestyle S13	53.82	3 Q	54.73	8
Raman Salei	100 m freestyle S13	54.32	2	Did not advance	
Raman Salei	400 m freestyle S13	4:13.83	3 Q	4:19.34	7
Dzmitry Salei	100 m butterfly S13	58.83	2 Q	58.16	5
Raman Salei	100 m butterfly S13	58.40	2 Q	58.11	4
Dzmitry Salei	100 m breaststroke SB12	1:08.68	1 Q	1:08.80	2nd place, silver medalist(s)
Dzmitry Salei	100 m backstroke S12	1:02.63	3 Q	1:02.70	6
Raman Salei	100 m backstroke S12	1:01.58	1 Q	1:00.91	2nd place, silver medalist(s)
Dzmitry Salei	200 m individual medley SM13	2:16.31	1 Q	2:13.83	4
Raman Salei	200 m individual medley SM13	2:19.37	3	Did not advance	

== See also ==
- Azerbaijan at the 2016 Summer Olympics
