= Azerbaijan at the 2020 Summer Paralympics =

- IPC code: AZE
- NPC: National Paralympic Committee of Azerbaijan
- Website: www.paralympic.az

in Tokyo
- Competitors: 36 in 6 sports
- Medals Ranked 10th: Gold 14 Silver 1 Bronze 4 Total 19

Summer Paralympics appearances (overview)
- 1996; 2000; 2004; 2008; 2012; 2016; 2020; 2024

Other related appearances
- Soviet Union (1988); Unified Team (1992)

Azerbaijan competed at the 2020 Summer Paralympics in Tokyo, Japan, from 24 August to 5 September 2021.

The team won 14 gold medals and 19 medals overall, beating their previous best of 4 golds and 12 medals in London 2012 and overall medal of 9 gold.

== Medalists ==
Medal	Name	Sport	Event	Date
Gold	Shahana Hajiyeva	Judo	Women's 48 kg	27 August
Gold	Raman Salei	Swimming	Men's 100 m backstroke S12	27 August
Gold	Vugar Shirinli	Judo	Men's 60 kg	27 August
Gold	Sevda Valiyeva	Judo	Women's 57 kg	28 August
Gold	Khanim Huseynova	Judo	Women's 63 kg	28 August
Gold	Huseyn Rahimli	Judo	Men's 81 kg	28 August
Gold	Hamed Heidari	Athletics	Men's javelin throw F57	28 August
Gold	Elvin Astanov	Athletics	Men's shot put F53	29 August
Gold	Dursadaf Karimova	Judo	Women's +70 kg	29 August
Gold	Raman Salei	Swimming	Men's 100 m freestyle S12	31 August
Gold	Vali Israfilov	Swimming	Men's 100 m breaststroke SB12	1 September
Gold	Raman Salei	Swimming	Men's 100 metre butterfly S12	3 September
Gold	Lamiya Valiyeva	Athletics	Women's 400 metres T13	4 September
Gold	Orkhan Aslanov	Athletics	Men's long jump T13	4 September
Silver	Lamiya Valiyeva	Athletics	Women's 100 metres T13	31 August
Bronze	Parvin Mammadov	Powerlifting	Men's 49 kg	26 August
Bronze	Namig Abasli	Judo	Men's 66 kg	27 August
Bronze	Ilham Zakiyev	Judo	Men's +100 kg	27 August
Bronze	Said Najafzade	Athletics	Men's long jump T12	30 August

Medals by sport
Sport	1st place, gold medalist(s)	2nd place, silver medalist(s)	3rd place, bronze medalist(s)	Total
Judo	6	0	2	8
Athletics	4	1	1	6
Swimming	4	0	0	4
Powerlifting	0	0	1	1
Total	14	1	4	19

Medals by date
Day	Date	1st place, gold medalist(s)	2nd place, silver medalist(s)	3rd place, bronze medalist(s)	Total
1	25 August	0	0	0	0
2	26 August	0	0	1	1
3	27 August	3	0	2	5
4	28 August	4	0	0	4
5	29 August	2	0	0	2
6	30 August	0	0	1	1
7	31 August	1	1	0	2
8	1 September	1	0	0	1
9	2 September	0	0	0	0
10	3 September	1	0	0	1
11	4 September	2	0	0	2
12	5 September	0	0	0	0
Total		14	1	4	19

== Competitors ==
#	Sport	Men	Women	Total	Events
1	Athletics	9	3	12	16
2	Judo	6	5	11	11
3	Powerlifting	4	0	4	4
4	Shooting	1	1	2	5
5	Swimming	2	1	3	7
6	Taekwondo	2	2	4	4
Total		24	12	36	47

== Athletics ==
12 Azerbaijani athlete in 16 events such as Kamil Aliyev (Long Jump T12), Olokhan Musayev (Discus Throw F56) & Samir Nabiyev (Shot Put F57) successfully to break through the qualifications for the 2020 Paralympics after breaking the qualification limit.

Athlete	Event	Heats		Final	
Athlete	Event	Result	Rank	Result	Rank
Men's Track
Elmir Jabrayilov	100m T13	DNF	-	Did not advance	
Elmir Jabrayilov	400m T13	52.17	12	Did not advance	
Men's Field
Kamil Aliyev	Long jump T12	—N/a		6.89	5
Orkhan Aslanov	Long jump T13	—N/a		7.36 AR	1st place, gold medalist(s)
Elvin Astanov	Shot put F53	—N/a		8.77 PR	1st place, gold medalist(s)
Orkhan Gasimov	Javelin throw F13	—N/a		58.96	5
Hamed Heidari	Javelin throw F57	—N/a		51.42 WR, PR	1st place, gold medalist(s)
Olokhan Musayev	Shot put F55	—N/a		11.89	5
Olokhan Musayev	Discus throw F56	—N/a		37.92	7
Samir Nabiyev	Shot put F57	—N/a		13.12	7
Said Najafzade	Long jump T12	—N/a		7.03	3rd place, bronze medalist(s)
Women's Track
Elena Chebanu	100m T13	12.16	3 Q	12.41	7
Iuliia Ianovskaia	100m T13	12.41	8 Q	12.30	4
Iuliia Ianovskaia	400m T13	56.55	2 Q	57.18	5
Lamiya Valiyeva	100m T13	12.09	2 Q	11.99	2nd place, silver medalist(s)
Lamiya Valiyeva	400m T13	55.71	2 Q	55.00 PR	1st place, gold medalist(s)

== Judo ==
Athlete	Event	Round of 16	Quarterfinals	Semifinals	Repechage 1	Repechage 2	Final / BM	
Athlete	Event	Opposition Result	Opposition Result	Opposition Result	Opposition Result	Opposition Result	Opposition Result	Rank
Men
Vugar Shirinli	−60 kg	Bye	Çiftçi (TUR); W 10s1–0s2	Bologa (ROU); W 1s1–0	Bye		Sariyev (KAZ); W 10–1s2	1st place, gold medalist(s)
Namig Abasli	−66 kg	Bye	Ibáñez (ESP); L 0s2–1	Did not advance	Pérez (PUR); W 10–0	Rudenko (RPC); W 1s1–0	Khorava (UKR); W 1s2–0s1	3rd place, bronze medalist(s)
Ramil Gasimov	−73 kg	Daulet (KAZ); L DNS	Did not advance					
Huseyn Rahimli	−81 kg	Bye	Powell (GBR); W 11s1–0	Lee (KOR); W 10–0s1	Bye		Karomatov (UZB); W 10–1s2	1st place, gold medalist(s)
Kanan Abdullakhanli	−100 kg	Khalilov (UZB); L 0s1–10s2	Did not advance					
Ilham Zakiyev	+100 kg	Hodgson (GBR); W 1s2–0s1	Choi (KOR); L 0s2–1s2	Did not advance		Subba (JAM); W 10–0s1	Sharipov (UZB); W BYE	3rd place, bronze medalist(s)
Women
Shahana Hajiyeva	−48 kg	Bye	Hangai (JPN); W 10–0	Potapova (RPC); W 10–0	Bye		Martinet (FRA); W 10s1–1	1st place, gold medalist(s)
Basti Safarova	−52 kg	Bye	Fujiwara (JPN); L 0s3–10s2	Did not advance		Nikolaychyk (UKR); L 0–10	Did not advance	
Sevda Valiyeva	−57 kg	Bye	Fedossova (KAZ); W 10–0	Çelik (TUR); W 10s1–0	Bye		Samandarova (UZB); W 1–0s2	1st place, gold medalist(s)
Khanim Huseynova	−63 kg	Bye	Kudo (JPN); W 10s1–0s1	Wang Yue (CHN); W 1s1–0	Bye		Husieva (UKR); W 1–0	1st place, gold medalist(s)
Dursadaf Karimova	+70 kg	—N/a	Harnyk (UKR); W 10–0	Emmerich (BRA); W 11s2–1s1	Bye		Baibatina (KAZ); W 10s1–0s2	1st place, gold medalist(s)

== Powerlifting ==
Athlete	Event	Result	Rank
Parvin Mammadov	Men's −49 kg	156	3rd place, bronze medalist(s)
Nurlan Babajanov	Men's −97 kg	185	7
Elshan Huseynov	Men's −107 kg	NM	
Shamo Aslanov	Men's +107 kg	NM	

== Shooting ==
Azerbaijan entered one athletes into the Paralympic competition. Kamran Zeynalov successfully break the Paralympic qualification at the 2019 WSPS World Championships which was held in Sydney, Australia.

Athlete	Event	Qualification		Final	
Athlete	Event	Score	Rank	Score	Rank
Yelena Taranova	Women's P2 – 10 m air pistol SH1	538	16	Did not advance	
Yelena Taranova	Mixed P3 – 25 m pistol SH1	516	29	Did not advance	
Yelena Taranova	Mixed P4 – 50 m pistol SH1	503	29	Did not advance	
Kamran Zeynalov	Men's P1 – 10 m air pistol SH1	543	23	Did not advance	
Kamran Zeynalov	Mixed P4 – 50 m pistol SH1	518	20	Did not advance	

== Swimming ==
Three Azerbaijani swimmer has successfully entered the paralympic slot after breaking the 2019 World Championship & MQS.

Athlete	Event	Heats		Final	
Athlete	Event	Result	Rank	Result	Rank
Men
Vali Israfilov	100m breaststroke SB12	—N/a		1:04.86 PR	1st place, gold medalist(s)
Vali Israfilov	100m butterfly S12	1:10.59	10	Did not advance	
Raman Salei	50m freestyle S13	23.98	3 Q	23.85	4
Raman Salei	100m freestyle S12	53.89	2 Q	52.69	1st place, gold medalist(s)
Raman Salei	100m backstroke S12	—N/a		1:00:30	1st place, gold medalist(s)
Raman Salei	100m butterfly S12	58.99	1 Q	57.81	1st place, gold medalist(s)
Women
Dana Shandibina	100m breaststroke SB13	1:24.51	11	Did not advance	

== Taekwondo ==
Azerbaijan qualified four athletes to compete at the Paralympics competition. All of them confirmed to compete at the games by winning the gold medal at the 2021 European Qualification Tournament in Sofia, Bulgaria.

Athlete	Event	First round	Quarterfinals	Semifinals	Repechage 1	Repechage 2	Final / BM	
Athlete	Event	Opposition Result	Opposition Result	Opposition Result	Opposition Result	Opposition Result	Opposition Result	Rank
Men
Imamaddin Khalilov	Men's –61 kg	Sidorov (RPC); L 19–25	Did not advance		Tanaka (JPN); W 20–15	Kong (FRA); L 26–29	Did not advance	7
Abulfaz Abuzarli	Men's –75 kg	Ganapin (PHI); W WDQ	García (MEX); L 5–38	Did not advance	Shvets (UKR); W 60–36	Joo (KOR); L 32–46	Did not advance	7
Women
Royala Fataliyeva	Women's –49 kg	Phuangkitcha (THA); L 4–17	Did not advance		Tanwar (IND); W WWD	Marchuk (UKR); L 20–26	Did not advance	7
Aynur Mammadova	Women's +58 kg	Lypetska (UKR); WD	Did not advance					

== See also ==
- Azerbaijan at the Paralympics
- Azerbaijan at the 2020 Summer Olympics
