= List of Azerbaijani Paralympic competitors =

This is a complete list of Paralympic competitors from Azerbaijan.

== B ==
- Zeynidin Bilalov, athlete

== I ==
- Ramin Ibrahimov, judoka

== M ==
- Vugar Mehdiyev, athlete
- Akbar Muradov, shooter
- Olokhan Musayev, athlete

== P ==
- Oleg Panyutin, athlete
- Natali Pronina, swimmer

== S ==
- Afag Sultanova, judoka

== T ==
- Yelena Taranova, shooter

== V ==
- Zinyat Valiyeva, archer

== Z ==
- Ilham Zakiyev, judoka
- Vladimir Zayets, athlete

== See also ==
- Azerbaijan at the Paralympics
- Paralympic Games
