= Azerbaijan at the 2024 Summer Paralympics =

- Flag of Azerbaijan
- IPC code: AZE
- NPC: National Paralympic Committee of Azerbaijan
- Website: www.paralympic.az

in Paris, France August 28, 2024 – September 8, 2024
- Competitors: 18 (13 men and 5 women) in 7 sports
- Flag bearers: Imamaddin Khalilov; Lamiya Valiyeva
- Medals Ranked 28th: Gold 4 Silver 2 Bronze 5 Total 11

Summer Paralympics appearances (overview)
- 1996; 2000; 2004; 2008; 2012; 2016; 2020; 2024

Other related appearances
- Soviet Union (1988); Unified Team (1992)

Azerbaijan competed at the 2024 Summer Paralympics in Paris, France, from 28 August to 8 September 2024.

== Medalists ==
| Medal | Name | Sport | Event | Date |
|---|---|---|---|---|
| Gold | Imamaddin Khalilov | Taekwondo | Men's 70 kg | 30 August |
| Gold | Said Najafzade | Athletics | Men's long jump T12 | 2 September |
| Gold | Lamiya Valiyeva | Athletics | Women's 100 m T13 | 3 September |
| Gold | Orkhan Aslanov | Athletics | Men's long jump T13 | 7 September |
| Silver | Raman Salei | Swimming | Men's 100 metre backstroke S12 | 31 August |
| Silver | Lamiya Valiyeva | Athletics | Women's 400 m T13 | 7 September |
| Bronze | Sabir Zeynalov | Taekwondo | Men's 58 kg | 29 August |
| Bronze | Raman Salei | Swimming | Men's 100 metre freestyle S12 | 4 September |
| Bronze | Vali Israfilov | Swimming | Men's 100 metre breaststroke SB13 | 5 September |
| Bronze | Ilham Zakiyev | Judo | Men's +90 kg J1 | 7 September |
| Bronze | Raman Salei | Swimming | Men's 100 metre butterfly S12 | 7 September |

Medals by sport
| Sport | 1st place, gold medalist(s) | 2nd place, silver medalist(s) | 3rd place, bronze medalist(s) | Total |
| Athletics | 3 | 1 | 0 | 4 |
| Taekwondo | 1 | 0 | 1 | 2 |
| Swimming | 0 | 1 | 3 | 4 |
| Judo | 0 | 0 | 1 | 1 |
| Total | 4 | 2 | 5 | 11 |

== Competitors ==
The following is the list of number of competitors in the Games.

| Sport | Men | Women | Total |
|---|---|---|---|
| Archery | 1 | 0 | 1 |
| Athletics | 4 | 1 | 5 |
| Judo | 1 | 2 | 3 |
| Powerlifting | 1 | 0 | 1 |
| Shooting | 1 | 1 | 2 |
| Swimming | 2 | 1 | 3 |
| Taekwondo | 3 | 0 | 3 |
| Total | 13 | 5 | 18 |

== Archery ==
| Athlete | Event | Ranking Round | | Round of 32 | Round of 16 | Quarterfinals | Semifinals | Finals | |
| Athlete | Event | Score | Seed | Opposition Score | Opposition Score | Opposition Score | Opposition Score | Opposition Score | Rank |
|---|---|---|---|---|---|---|---|---|---|
| Jahan Musayev | Men's individual recurve | 568 | 28 | Arab Ameri (IRI); L 4-6 | Did not advance | | | | |

== Athletics ==
Azerbaijan track and field athletes achieved quota places for the following events based on their results at the 2023 World Championships, 2024 World Championships, or through high performance allocation, as long as they meet the minimum entry standard (MES).

Key

- Note–Ranks given for track events are within the athlete's heat only
- Q = Qualified for the next round
- q = Qualified for the next round as a fastest loser or, in field events, by position without achieving the qualifying target
- DQ = Disqualified
- PR = Paralympic Record
- AR = Area (or continental) Record
- NR = National Record
- SB = Season's Best
- N/A = Round not applicable for the event
- Bye = Athlete not required to compete in round

Track & road events

| Athlete | Event | Heat | | Final | |
| Athlete | Event | Result | Rank | Result | Rank |
|---|---|---|---|---|---|
| Lamiya Valiyeva | Women's 100 m T13 | 11.81 | 1 Q | 11.76 | 1st place, gold medalist(s) |
| Lamiya Valiyeva | Women's 400 m T13 | 56.51 | 2 Q | 55.09 | 2nd place, silver medalist(s) |

Field events

| Athlete | Event | Final | |
| Athlete | Event | Distance | Position |
|---|---|---|---|
| Said Najafzade | Men's long jump T12 | 7.27 | 1st place, gold medalist(s) |
| Orkhan Aslanov | Men's long jump T13 | 7.29 | 1st place, gold medalist(s) |
| Rufat Rafiyev | Men's shot put F36 | 13.38 | 6 |
| Olokhan Musayev | Men's shot put F55 | 11.44 | 5 |

== Judo ==
Men

| Athlete | Event | Round of 16 | Quarterfinals | Semifinals | Repechage 1st round | Repechage Final | Final / BM | |
| Athlete | Event | Opposition Score | Opposition Score | Opposition Score | Opposition Score | Opposition Score | Opposition Score | Rank |
|---|---|---|---|---|---|---|---|---|
| Ilham Zakiyev | +90kg J1 | —N/a | Grandry (FRA); L 0-10 | —N/a | | Knegt (NED); W 10-0 | Dashtseren (MGL); W 1-0 | 3rd place, bronze medalist(s) |

Women

| Athlete | Event | Round of 16 | Quarterfinals | Semifinals | Repechage 1st round | Repechage Final | Final / BM | |
| Athlete | Event | Opposition Score | Opposition Score | Opposition Score | Opposition Score | Opposition Score | Opposition Score | Rank |
|---|---|---|---|---|---|---|---|---|
| Khatira Ismiyeva | +70kg J1 | Aldhanhani (UAE); W 10-1 | Gunes (TUR); L 0-10 | —N/a | | Sanabria Alcala (VEN); W 10-0 | Garcia (USA); L 0-10 | 5 |
| Dursadaf Karimova | +70kg J2 | —N/a | Silva (BRA); L 0-10 | —N/a | | Leze (FRA); W 10-0 | Wang (CHN); L 0-10 | 5 |

== Powerlifting ==
| Athlete | Event | Attempts (kg) | | | | Result (kg) | Rank |
| Athlete | Event | 1 | 2 | 3 | 4 | Result (kg) | Rank |
|---|---|---|---|---|---|---|---|
| Jeyhun Mahmudov | Men's 54 kg | ~~158~~ | 158 | ~~163~~ | —N/a | 158 | 8 |

== Shooting ==
Azerbaijan entered one para-shooter's after achieved quota places for the following events by virtue of their best finishes at the 2022, 2023 and 2024 world cup, 2022 World Championships, 2023 World Championships, 2023 European Para Championships and 2024 European Championships, as long as they obtained a minimum qualifying score (MQS) by May 31, 2020.

Men

| Athlete | Event | Qualification | | Final | |
| Athlete | Event | Points | Rank | Points | Rank |
|---|---|---|---|---|---|
| Kamran Zeynalov | P1 Men's 10 metre air pistol SH1 | 559-13x | 13 | Did not advance | |

Women

| Athlete | Event | Qualification | | Final | |
| Athlete | Event | Points | Rank | Points | Rank |
|---|---|---|---|---|---|
| Aybaniz Babayeva | P2 Women's 10 metre air pistol SH1 | 542-7x | 13 | Did not advance | |

Mixed

| Athlete | Event | Qualification | | Final | |
| Athlete | Event | Points | Rank | Points | Rank |
|---|---|---|---|---|---|
| Aybaniz Babayeva | P4 Mixed 50 metre pistol SH1 | 507-3x | 26 | Did not advance | |
| Kamran Zeynalov | P4 Mixed 50 metre pistol SH1 | 529-10x | 14 | Did not advance | |

== Swimming ==
Azerbaijan secured one quotas at the 2023 World Para Swimming Championships after finishing in the top two places in Paralympic class disciplines.

Men

| Athlete | Event | Heats | | Final | |
| Athlete | Event | Result | Rank | Result | Rank |
|---|---|---|---|---|---|
| Vali Israfilov | Men's 100 m breaststroke SB13 | 1:05.82 | 3 Q | 1:05.35 | 3rd place, bronze medalist(s) |
| Raman Salei | Men's 50 m freestyle S13 | 24.39 | 9 | Did not advance | |
| Raman Salei | Men's 100 m freestyle S12 | 54.21 | 4 | 53.65 | 3rd place, bronze medalist(s) |
| Raman Salei | Men's 100 m backstroke S12 | 1:01.29 | 2 Q | 1:00.67 | 2nd place, silver medalist(s) |
| Raman Salei | Men's 100 m butterfly S12 | 58.16 | 2 Q | 58.13 | 3rd place, bronze medalist(s) |

Women

| Athlete | Event | Heats | | Final | |
| Athlete | Event | Result | Rank | Result | Rank |
|---|---|---|---|---|---|
| Konul Suleymanova | Women's 50 m backstroke S2 | 1:52.64 | 11 | Did not advance | |
| Konul Suleymanova | Women's 100 m backstroke S2 | 4:03.04 | 11 | Did not advance | |

== Taekwondo ==
Azerbaijan entered three athletes to compete at the Paralympics competition. Sabir Zeynalov, Imammadin Khalilov and Abulfaz Abuzarli, qualified for Paris 2024, by virtue of finishing within the top six in the Paralympic rankings in their respective division.

| Athlete | Event | First round | Quarterfinals | Semifinals | Repechage | Final / BM | |
| Athlete | Event | Opposition Result | Opposition Result | Opposition Result | Opposition Result | Opposition Result | Rank |
|---|---|---|---|---|---|---|---|
| Sabir Zeynalov | Men's –58 kg | Bye | Tanaka (JPN); W 6-5 | Özcan (TUR); L 18-23 | —N/a | Kaenkham (THA); W12-4 | 3rd place, bronze medalist(s) |
| Imamaddin Khalilov | Men's –70 kg | Bye | Suárez (CUB); W 12-2 | Alikulov (UZB); W 7-2 | —N/a | Çelik (TUR); W 15-2 | 1st place, gold medalist(s) |
| Abulfaz Abuzarli | Men's –80 kg | Ganapin (PHI); W 12-9 | Nájera (MEX); L 3-6 | —N/a | Spajić (SRB); L 9-11 | Did not advance | |

== See also ==
- Azerbaijan at the 2024 Summer Olympics
- Azerbaijan at the Paralympics
