= Azerbaijan at the 2004 Summer Paralympics =

- IPC code: AZE
- NPC: National Paralympic Committee of Azerbaijan
- Website: www.paralympic.az

in Athens
- Competitors: 9 in 4 sports
- Medals Ranked 45th: Gold 2 Silver 1 Bronze 1 Total 4

Summer Paralympics appearances (overview)
- 1996; 2000; 2004; 2008; 2012; 2016; 2020; 2024

Other related appearances
- Soviet Union (1988); Unified Team (1992)

Azerbaijan competed at the 2004 Summer Paralympics in Athens, Greece. Two powerlifters failed drug tests for steroids in initial drug tests on 18 September 2004 and were banned for life from the Paralympics having both failed tests in previous championships. Sara Abbasova competed in the women's -82.5 kg category and had her first violation at the 2001 powerlifting championships in Hungary. Gunduz Ismayilov who had set a world record and won a gold medal in Men's -90 kg competition at the 2000 Summer Paralympics was stripped of it and had his record nullified after testing positive for nandrolone.

== Medalists ==
Medal	Name	Sport	Event	Date
Gold	Ilham Zakiyev	Judo	Men +100 kg	20 September
Gold	Oleg Panyutin	Athletics	Long jump - F12	19 September
Silver	Zeynidin Bilalov	Athletics	Triple jump - F11	27 September
Bronze	Yelena Taranova	Shooting	Women's P2 - 10m	19 September

== Sports ==
=== Athletics ===
==== Men's track ====
Athlete	Class	Event	Heats		Semifinal		Final	
Athlete	Class	Event	Result	Rank	Result	Rank	Result	Rank
Zeynidin Bilalov	T11	100m	DNS		did not advance			
Yuriy Gornak	T13	100m	11.59	10	did not advance			
Yuriy Gornak	T13	200m	23.05	6 Q	—N/a		23.53	5
Yuriy Gornak	T13	400m	—N/a				51.01	4
Oleg Panyutin	T12	100m	DNF		did not advance			
Oleg Panyutin	T12	200m	DNF		did not advance			
Aleksandr Polishuk	T46	100m	11.50	6 Q	—N/a		DNS	
Aleksandr Polishuk	T46	200m	23.22	9	did not advance			
Aleksandr Polishuk	T46	400m	51.38	1 Q	—N/a		50.99	5
Aleksandr Polishuk	T46	800m	DNF		did not advance			

==== Men's field ====
Athlete	Class	Event	Final		
Athlete	Class	Event	Result	Points	Rank
Bahruz Bashirov	F42	Javelin	33.29	-	11
Bahruz Bashirov	F42	Shot put	10.06	-	10
Zeynidin Bilalov	F11	Long jump	5.50	-	12
Zeynidin Bilalov	F11	Triple jump	12.88	-	2nd place, silver medalist(s)
Alibala Huseynov	F57	Shot put	10.06	-	9
Oleg Panyutin	F12	Long jump	7.25 WR	-	1st place, gold medalist(s)

=== Judo ===
Men

Athlete	Event	Round of 16	Quarterfinals	Semifinals	Repechage 1	Repechage 2	Final / BM	
Athlete	Event	Opposition Result	Opposition Result	Opposition Result	Opposition Result	Opposition Result	Opposition Result	Rank
Ilham Zakiyev	+100 kg	Bye	Torres Pompa (CUB); W 1001–0001	Campos Ariza (ESP); W 1010–0000	Bye		Rose (GBR); W 1000–0000	1st place, gold medalist(s)

=== Powerlifting ===
==== Men ====
Athlete	Event	Result	Rank
Fouad Tarverdiyev	82.5kg	145.0	14

=== Shooting ===
==== Women ====
Athlete	Event	Qualification		Final		
Athlete	Event	Score	Rank	Score	Total	Rank
Yelena Taranova	Mixed 50m pistol SH1	517	13	did not advance		
Yelena Taranova	Women's 10m air pistol SH1	363	5 Q	94.3	457.3	3rd place, bronze medalist(s)

== See also ==
- Azerbaijan at the Paralympics
- Azerbaijan at the 2004 Summer Olympics
