= Athletics at the 2004 Summer Paralympics – Men's long jump F11–13 =

Men's long jump events for blind & visually impaired athletes were held at the 2004 Summer Paralympics in the Athens Olympic Stadium. Events were held in three disability classes.

== F11 ==
Men's Long Jump F11 at the XII Paralympic Games
- Venue: Athens Olympic Stadium
- Dates: 19 September 2004
- Competitors: 13 from 11 nations
- Winning distance: 6.40

Medalists
1st place, gold medalist(s)		Li Duan	China
2nd place, silver medalist(s)		Elexis Gillette	United States
3rd place, bronze medalist(s)		Sergey Sevostianov	Russia

The F11 event was won by Li Duan, representing China.

19 Sept. 2004, 19:00

Rank	Athlete	Result	Notes
1st place, gold medalist(s)	Li Duan (CHN)	6.40	
2nd place, silver medalist(s)	Elexis Gillette (USA)	6.24	
3rd place, bronze medalist(s)	Sergey Sevostianov (RUS)	6.10	
4	Jorge Jay Maso (CUB)	5.96	
5	Athanasios Barakas (GRE)	5.87	
6	Dimitrios Alexiou (GRE)	5.85	
7	Lukas Hendry (SUI)	5.84	
8	Viktar Zhukouski (BLR)	5.83	
9	Xavi Porras (ESP)	5.79	
10	Bil Marinkovic (AUT)	5.71	
11	José Manuel Rodríguez (ESP)	5.62	
12	Zeynidin Bilalov (AZE)	5.50	
13	Mineho Ozaki (JPN)	5.45	

== F12 ==
Men's Long Jump F12 at the XII Paralympic Games
- Venue: Athens Olympic Stadium
- Dates: 21 September 2004
- Competitors: 19 from 14 nations
- Winning distance: 7.25

Medalists
1st place, gold medalist(s)		Oleg Panyutin	Azerbaijan
2nd place, silver medalist(s)		Hilton Langenhoven	South Africa
3rd place, bronze medalist(s)		Duan Qifeng	China

The F12 event was won by Oleg Panyutin, representing Azerbaijan.

21 Sept. 2004, 19:00

Rank	Athlete	Result	Notes
1st place, gold medalist(s)	Oleg Panyutin (AZE)	7.25	WR
2nd place, silver medalist(s)	Hilton Langenhoven (RSA)	7.03	
3rd place, bronze medalist(s)	Duan Qifeng (CHN)	7.00	
4	Odúver Daza (VEN)	7.00	
5	Stéphane Bozzolo (FRA)	6.91	
6	Matthias Schroeder (GER)	6.83	
7	Igor Gorbenko (UKR)	6.70	
8	Ivan Kytsenko (UKR)	6.56	
9	Juan Viedma (ESP)	6.55	
10	Fernando Gonzalez (CUB)	6.52	
11	Marcin Wesolowski (POL)	6.44	
12	Enrique Cepeda (CUB)	6.38	
13	Joerg Trippen (GER)	6.37	
14	Javier Martin (ESP)	6.36	
15	Kurt van Raefelghem (BEL)	6.35	
16	Daniel Moreno (ESP)	6.34	
17	Abdulhadi Al Yousef (KSA)	6.14	
18	Ruslan Sivitski (BLR)	6.10	
19	Miloš Grlica (SCG)	5.19	

== F13 ==
Men's Long Jump F13 at the XII Paralympic Games
- Venue: Athens Olympic Stadium
- Dates: 21 September 2004
- Competitors: 9 from 9 nations
- Winning distance: 7.15

Medalists
1st place, gold medalist(s)		Ángel Jiménez	Cuba
2nd place, silver medalist(s)		Ihar Fartunau	Belarus
3rd place, bronze medalist(s)		Mohammed Fannouna	Palestine

The F13 event was won by Ángel Jiménez, representing Cuba.

21 Sept. 2004, 10:45

Rank	Athlete	Result	Notes
1st place, gold medalist(s)	Ángel Jiménez (CUB)	7.15	
2nd place, silver medalist(s)	Ihar Fartunau (BLR)	7.09	
3rd place, bronze medalist(s)	Mohammed Fannouna (PLE)	6.59	
4	Xu Xiaocheng (CHN)	6.41	
5	Ronan Pallier (FRA)	6.39	
6	Jonathan Ntutu (RSA)	6.15	
7	Kordian Galinski (POL)	6.00	
8	Donko Angelov (BUL)	5.83	
9	Shahzad Muhammad (PAK)	4.35	
