= Azerbaijan at the 2000 Summer Paralympics =

- IPC code: AZE
- NPC: National Paralympic Committee of Azerbaijan
- Website: www.paralympic.az

in Sydney
- Competitors: 7
- Medals Ranked 60th: Gold 0 Silver 1 Bronze 0 Total 1

Summer Paralympics appearances (overview)
- 1996; 2000; 2004; 2008; 2012; 2016; 2020; 2024

Other related appearances
- Soviet Union (1988); Unified Team (1992)

Azerbaijan competed at the 2000 Summer Paralympics in Sydney, Australia having won one silver medal. Powerlifter Gunduz Ismayilov who initially had won a gold medal in Men's -90kg competition lifting 240 kg to set a world record was stripped of it with his record nullified after testing positive for the anabolic steroid nandrolone. Ismayilov subsequently was banned from the Paralympics for life in 2004 after testing positive for stanazolol in the 2004 Summer Paralympics.

== Medalists ==
Medal	Name	Sport	Event	Date
Silver	Yelena Taranova	Shooting	Mixed free pistol - SH1	24 October

== See also ==
- Azerbaijan at the Paralympics
- Azerbaijan at the 2000 Summer Olympics
