= Azerbaijan at the 2022 Winter Paralympics =

- Flag of Azerbaijan
- IPC code: AZE
- NPC: National Paralympic Committee of Azerbaijan
- Website: www.paralympic.az

in Beijing, China 4 March 2022 – 13 March 2022
- Competitors: 1 (on foot) in 1 sport
- Flag bearer: Volunteer
- Medals: Gold 0 Silver 0 Bronze 0 Total 0

Winter Paralympics appearances (overview)
- 2022; 2026

Other related appearances
- Soviet Union (1988); Unified Team (1992)

Azerbaijan participated at the 2022 Winter Paralympics in Beijing, China which took place between 4–13 March 2022. It was the first time Azerbaijan participated at the Winter Paralympics.

Rauf Mursalov served as Chef de Mission. Mehman Ramazanzade would have been the flagbearer for Azerbaijan during the opening ceremony, but due to the injury he missed the ceremony. At the opening ceremony, the Azerbaijani delegation included Rauf Mursalov, Azer Tapdygov and Magomed Ismailov.

In 2008, Ramazanzade competed in powerlifting in the men's 100 kg event at the 2008 Summer Paralympics held in Beijing, China.

== Competitors ==
The following is the list of number of competitors participating at the Games per sport/discipline.

Sport	Men	Women	Total
Cross-country skiing	1	0	1
Total	1	0	1

== Cross-country skiing ==
Azerbaijan qualified one athlete to compete in cross-country skiing. At the last training session on the eve of the start, the only athlete of Azerbaijan Mehman Ramazanzade was seriously injured. He was supposed to compete on 9 March in the cross-country competition (sitting) but was not able to compete.

Athlete	Event	Qualification		Semifinal		Final	
Athlete	Event	Time	Rank	Time	Rank	Time	Rank
Mehman Ramazanzade	Men's sprint, sitting	DNS					

== See also ==
- Azerbaijan at the Paralympics
- Azerbaijan at the 2022 Winter Olympics
