= Azerbaijan at the 1996 Summer Paralympics =

- IPC code: AZE
- NPC: National Paralympic Committee of Azerbaijan
- Website: www.paralympic.az

in Atlanta
- Competitors: 2
- Medals: Gold 0 Silver 0 Bronze 0 Total 0

Summer Paralympics appearances (overview)
- 1996; 2000; 2004; 2008; 2012; 2016; 2020; 2024

Other related appearances
- Soviet Union (1988); Unified Team (1992)

Two males athletes from Azerbaijan competed at the 1996 Summer Paralympics in Atlanta, United States.

== See also ==
- Azerbaijan at the Paralympics
- Azerbaijan at the 1996 Summer Olympics
