= Zakiyev =

Zakiyev is a surname. Notable people with the surname include:

- Ilham Zakiyev (born 1980), Azerbaijani judoka
- Shahin Zakiyev (born 1999), Azerbaijani footballer
