= Kamran Zeynalov =

Azerbaijani Paralympic shooter (1992)

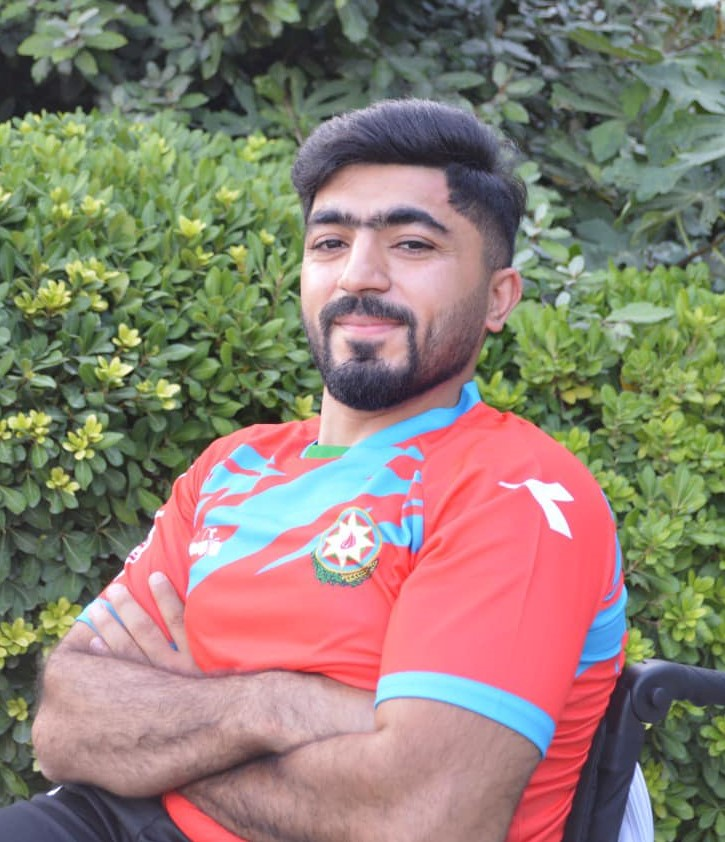
- Zeynalov in 2021

Personal information
- Born: 28 January 1992 (age 33); Sabirabad District, Azerbaijan

Sport
- Sport: Shooting

Kamran Turab oglu Zeynalov (Azerbaijani: Kamran Turab oğlu Zeynalov; born 28 January 1992) is an Azerbaijani athlete specializing in sport shooting as a Paralympic shooter. He is the 2023 World Champion, a silver and bronze medalist at the 2014 World Championship, a bronze medalist at the 2013 European Championship, a winner of the 2014 World Cup, and a bronze medalist at the 2011 World Cup. Zeynalov represented Azerbaijan at the 2020 Summer Paralympic Games in Tokyo and 2024 Summer Paralympic Games in Paris.

== Biography ==
Kamran Turab oglu Zeynalov was born on 28 January 1992, in the Sabirabad District of Azerbaijan. Zeynalov has a congenital condition of cerebral palsy. When he was four years old, his family relocated to Baku. In 1999, they moved again, selling their apartment in Baku and moving to Sumgait to finance Kamran's medical treatment. Zeynalov completed his secondary education at home. He has stated that he excelled in his studies, particularly enjoying algebra, and achieved recognition in national Olympiads for the subject. However, he chose not to pursue higher education, citing difficulties with commuting.

From a young age, Zeynalov showed an interest in sports, particularly football and weightlifting. In 2008, he watched a television program about preparations for the Beijing Paralympic Games, featuring 2004 Paralympic judo champion Ilham Zakiyev. Inspired by Zakiyev's story, Zeynalov joined the Paralympic Committee. Initially, he expressed interest in weightlifting, but the associated costs for supplements were beyond the family's means. He was subsequently encouraged to try shooting, but initially declined. Later, during a visit to the Paralympic Complex in Sumgait with a friend who was a judoka, Zeynalov met judo coach Zaur Rajabli. Rajabli encouraged him to consider shooting as a sport. Following this, Zeynalov began training in sports shooting under the guidance of coach Vitaly Sotnikov.

In 2010, Kamran Zeynalov placed fourth in the IPC Shooting World Cup in Antalya, Turkey in the 10m air pistol event. In 2011, he won a bronze medal at the World Cup in Alicante, Spain in the team 10m air pistol shooting event.

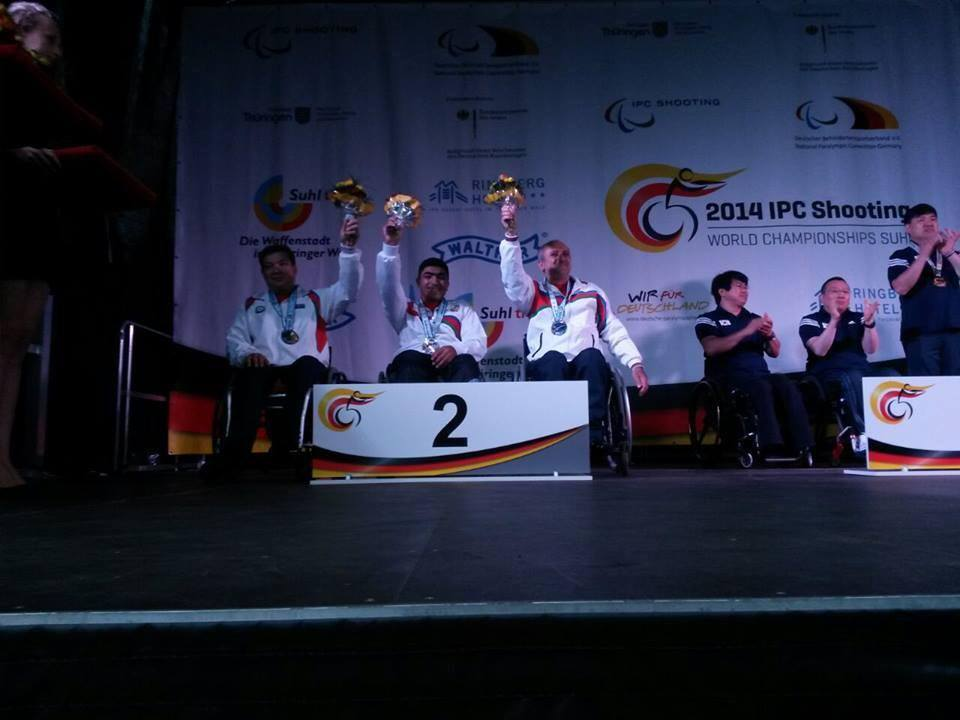
Kamran Zeynalov (center) on the podium at the 2014 World Championships in Suhl, Germany

In 2013, Zeynalov earned a bronze medal at the European Championships in Alicante in the team 50m air pistol event. In March 2014, he, along with his team, won the IPC Shooting World Cup in Stoke Mandeville, England, scoring 1661 points, while he secured first place in the individual 10m event with a score of 194.5 points.

In July 2014, at the World Championships in Suhl, Germany, the Azerbaijani team, which included Zeynalov, secured second place in the 10m event and third place in the 50m event.

In October 2019, Zeynalov placed 12th in the 10m event (563 points) and 15th in the 50m event (524 points) at the World Championships in Sydney, Australia, securing a quota for the Tokyo Paralympics.

In July 2021, he won a gold medal in the 10m event at the Paralympic Shooting Grand Prix in Novi Sad, Serbia.

At the 2020 Tokyo Paralympic Games, Kamran Zeynalov scored 543 points in the 10m shooting event, finishing 23rd out of 27 participants and failing to advance to the final. In the 50m shooting event, he scored 518 points, placing 20th among 34 athletes and also missing the final.

In December 2022, he became the champion of the Azerbaijani Paralympic Pistol Shooting Championship in the individual category. In April 2023, he won the Azerbaijani Shooting Championship.

In May 2023, he competed in an international tournament in Hanover, winning three silver medals and one bronze. He earned silver in the mixed pairs event in the 10m air pistol (P2) with Yelena Taranova, silver in the 50m shooting event, bronze in the team 50m shooting event with Taranova and Aybaniz Babayeva, and silver in the team 10m air pistol (P1) alongside Rafig Aliyev and Rashad Imamaliyev.

In September 2023, at the Paralympic Pistol Shooting World Championships in Lima, Peru, Zeynalov, paired with Aybaniz Babayeva, won silver in the 10m shooting event (P6, mix). He also became the champion in the 50m shooting event, scoring 220.5 points, and secured a quota for the 2024 Summer Paralympic Games in Paris.

Zeynalov competed in the P1 category at the 2024 Paris Paralympic Games in the 10m shooting event. He placed 13th among 26 participants, but did not qualify for the final. In the P4 category 50m shooting event, he finished in 14th place.
