= Judo at the 2004 Summer Paralympics – Men's +100 kg =

Judo competition

Judo - Men's over 100 kg at the XII Paralympic Games
- Paralympic Judo
- Venue: Ano Liossia Olympic Hall
- Dates: 20 September 2004
- Competitors: 10 from 10 nations

Medalists
1st place, gold medalist(s)		Ilham Zakiyev	Azerbaijan
2nd place, silver medalist(s)		Ian Rose	Great Britain
3rd place, bronze medalist(s)		Keiji Amakawa	Japan
3rd place, bronze medalist(s)		Rafael Torres Pompa	Cuba

The Men's over 100 kg judo competition at the 2004 Summer Paralympics was held on 20 September at the Ano Liossia Olympic Hall.

The tournament bracket consisted of a single-elimination contest culminating in a gold medal match. There was also a repechage to determine the winners of the two bronze medals. Each judoka who had lost to a semifinalist (on this occasion this was just the losing quarter-finalists) competed in the repechage. The two judokas who lost in the semifinals faced the winner of the opposite half of the bracket's repechage in bronze medal bouts.

The event was won by Ilham Zakiyev, representing Azerbaijan.

== Results ==
The four digits represent scores of ippon, waza-ari, yuko and koka (which was still used at the time). A letter indicates a penalty of shido, chui, keikoku or hansoku make, which (at the time) also registered a score of koka, yuko, waza-ari or ippon, respectively, to the opponent. Penalties are escalated, thus 2 shido = chui, 3 shido = keikoku, 4 shido = hansoku make, save that a penalty of hansoku make direct results in exclusion from the remainder of the competition, while if it results from escalation it does not.

=== Competition bracket ===
Round of 16
Alexandre Silva (BRA)	0020S
Keiji Amakawa (JPN)	1012
Martin Osewald (GER)	0130S
Julien Taurines (FRA)	0001

Quarterfinals
Ian Rose (GBR)	1000
Yuong Chiat Looi (MAS)	0000
Keiji Amakawa (JPN)	0001S
Osman Akaev (RUS)	0002S
Fermin Campos Ariza (ESP)	0011
Martin Osewald (GER)	0000S
Ilham Zakiyev (AZE)	1001S
Rafael Torres Pompa (CUB)	0001S

Semifinals
Ian Rose (GBR)	0201S
Osman Akaev (RUS)	0001K
Fermin Campos Ariza (ESP)	0000
Ilham Zakiyev (AZE)	1010

Final
Ian Rose (GBR)	0000
Ilham Zakiyev (AZE)	1000

=== Repechage ===
Round 1
Yuong Chiat Looi (MAS)	0000
Keiji Amakawa (JPN)	1000
Martin Osewald (GER)	0000
Rafael Torres Pompa (CUB)	0210

Bronze medal matches
Keiji Amakawa (JPN)	0201S
Fermin Campos Ariza (ESP)	0001S
Rafael Torres Pompa (CUB)	1000
Osman Akaev (RUS)	0000
