= Athletics at the 2008 Summer Paralympics – Men's triple jump F11 =

The Men's Triple Jump F11 had its Final held on September 12 at 11:05.

== Medalists ==
Gold	Li Duan; China
Silver	Zeynidin Bilalov; Azerbaijan
Bronze	Javier Porras; Spain

== Results ==
Place	Athlete	1	2	3	4	5	6	Best
1	Li Duan (CHN)	12.27	13.33	x	12.76	x	13.71	13.71 WR
2	Zeynidin Bilalov (AZE)	x	10.69	x	x	12.80	x	12.80
3	Javier Porras (ESP)	12.28	12.03	12.69	12.20	12.71	12.64	12.71
4	Andrey Koptev (RUS)	x	12.16	12.38	12.40	12.44	12.39	12.44
5	Lex Gillette (USA)	11.29	x	x	11.78	x	12.19	12.19
6	Sergey Sevostyanov (RUS)	11.92	11.62	11.29	11.04	11.14	11.74	11.92
7	Athanasios Barakas (GRE)	x	11,57	x	x	x	11.89	11.89
8	Viktar Zhukousky (BLR)	11.35	10.91	x	x	11.53	-	11.53
	Felipe Gomes (BRA)							DNS
