= Xavier Porras =

Spanish Paralympic athlete

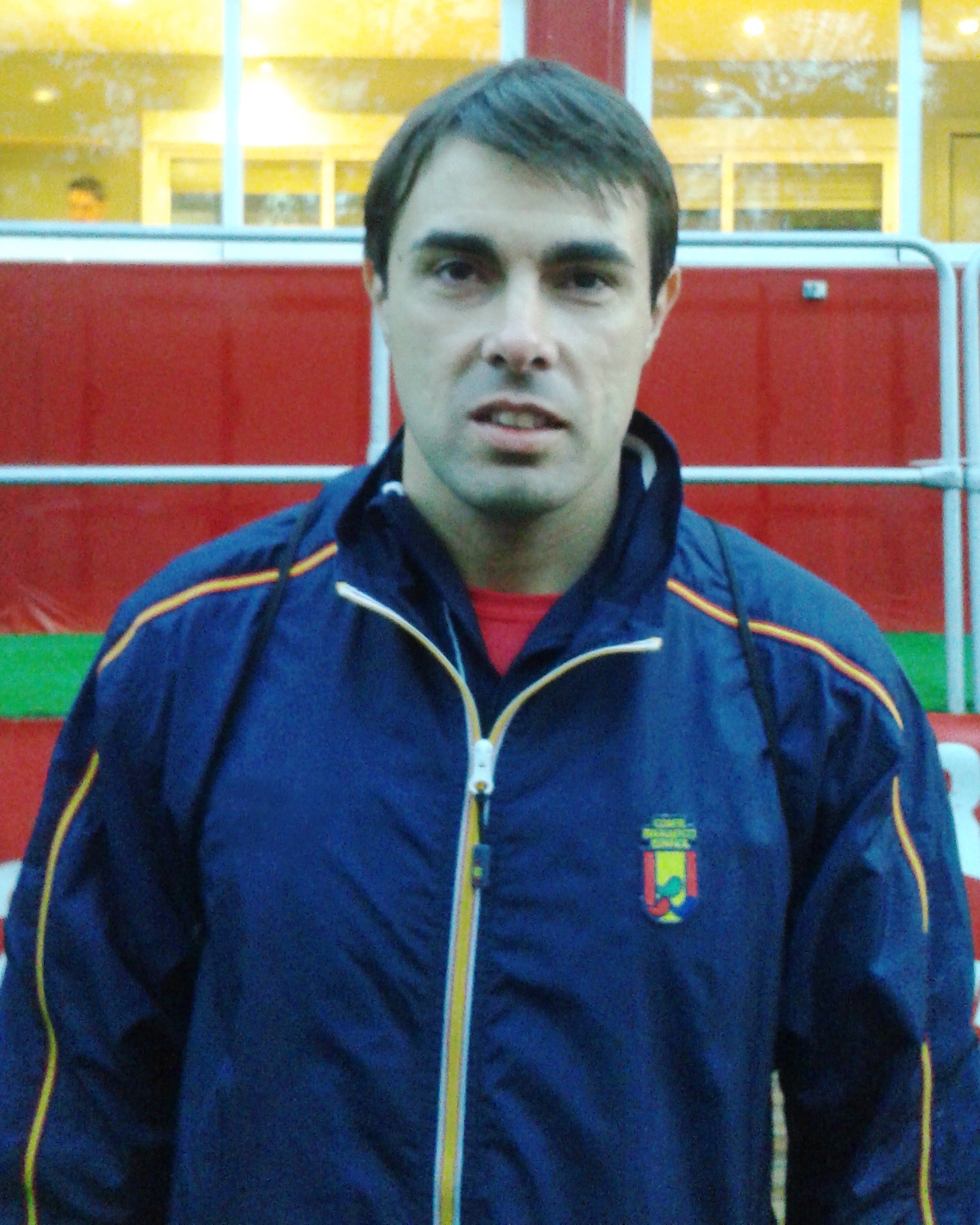

Personal information
- Full name: Xavier Porras Santana
- Nickname: Xavi
- Nationality: Spanish
- Born: 22 August 1981 (age 44) Olot, Girona, Spain
- Website: XaviPorras.com

Sport
- Country: Spain
- Sport: Track and field (T11)
- Event(s): triple jump, long jump, 4 × 100 m relay
- Club: FC Barcelona
Medal record
Men's para athletics (T11)
Representing Spain
Paralympic Games
Bronze medal – third place	2008 Beijing	Triple jump – T11
IPC World Championships {2 gold, 3 silver and 3 bronze}
IPC European Championships {1 gold, 4 silver and 4 bronze}

Xavier Porras Santana (born 22 August 1981 in Olot, Girona) is a Spanish paralympic sprinter and jumper who belongs to F.C. Barcelona and competes in the T11 / B1 category for blind athletes or athletes with a very reduced vision.

Since he debuted at 18 years old in the European of Lisbon, Xavi has always remained among the world elite. He has participated in three Paralympic Games (Athens 2004, Beijing 2008 -bronze in triple jump- and London 2012), seven World Athletics Championships (2 gold, 3 silver y 3 bronze) and seven European (2 gold, 4 silver and 4 bronze). He is also the indoor world record holder of the triple jump with a record of 12,77 m. In the triple jump, he has achieved his greatest success where he won two gold medals at The World Championships (13,02 m in Holland in 2006 and 12,77 m – world record indoors- in Sweden 2006); a bronze medal in the Paralympics (12,71 m in Beijing 2008) and a gold medal in the European Greece 2009 (12,76 m). Xavi won the title of Champion of Spain in the long jump with a mark of 5,82 m, while still preparing with his guide, Enric Martin, for the World Championships Doha 2015 and the Paralympic Games of Rio 2016, his two next challenges. Xavi Porras received the Bronze Medal of Merit Sports in 2016. The Sports Council (CSD) has granted admission to athlete Xavi Porras in the Royal Order of Sports Merit "considering the merits and circumstances" in the category bronze medal. This is the highest accolade for the sport in Spain. In 2016, he was proclaimed European champion in the long jump with a mark of 6.14 meters in the Italian city of Grosseto.

Xavi Porras is part of the most prestigious platform for an athlete, crowdfunding, 'Patrocínalos', of the Marca Sport Newspaper

== Biography ==
Porras spent his childhood shuffling between football, biking and skateboarding. From an early age, he was fascinated with physical exertion in general and football in particular. Thanks to the football club in his neighborhood (Club de Futbol Sant Roc), he had his first experience with competition. His vision problems started when he was very young; within one and a half years, he was diagnosed with retinitis pigmentosa, a degenerative congenital disease.

When he was fourteen, he joined ONCE and moved to the Center for Educational Resources Joan Amades in Barcelona, where in athletics he discovered extra motivation to live with his blindness, besides combining sport with his studies of Administrative Management.

In 2005, he signed for the athletics section of FC Barcelona with his partner Rosalía Lázaro being the first blind athletes in the history of the Catalan club. Xavi is also part of the ADOP plan, managed by the Spanish Paralympic Committee, being considered an athlete ARC (High Performance Catalan) by the Generalitat de Catalunya.

He is married to Rosalía Lázaro, who is the most decorated Spanish Paralympic athlete of all time in the long jump B2. She holds five Paralympic Games (from Barcelona 92 to Beijing 2008), counting three Paralympic medals, nine world championships and thirteen European championships. Xavi and Rosalia have a daughter together, Egara.

== Sport Biography ==
His beginnings were inspired by the image of his idol, Carl Lewis, in the Olympic Games of Barcelona '92. A key moment was in 1998 when he met his coach, Miguel Angel Torralba, who introduced him to the practice of athletics. They have never separated as Miguel is the one who plans his workouts and guides Xavi on jumps using the voice. In addition to his coach, Xavi has had, throughout his career, four guides that have been his extension both in speed tests and training:

- Sergio Segón (1999 / 2000)
- Antonio Delgado (2000 / 2004 -Athens-)
- Raúl Sabaté (2005 / 2008 -Beijing-)
- Enric Martín (2009 / actualidad -London'12-)

With his coach and guide, his career has been unstoppable, being more than three decades among the international elite. He has participated in three Paralympics: Athens 2004, Beijing 2008 and London 2012; seven World Championships: Lyon 2013, Christchurch (New Zealand 2011), São Paulo (Brazil 2007), Assen (Netherlands 2006), Visa World Cup in Manchester (UK 2006), World Championship indoor track in Bollnas (Sweden 2006), World Championship in Quebec (Canada 2003); and six European Championships (Swansea -Gales 2014) (Rodas- Greece 2009) (Espoo- Finland 2005) (Assen-Holland 2003), (Bialastok-Poland 2001) and (Lisbon-Portugal 1999). The successes of Xavi Porras are endorsed with big records whose personal bests are:

- World record of the Triple Jump Indoor – 12.77 m/ Gold in European 2006.
- Triple Jump Outdoor – 13.02 m that gave him gold in the Championships 2006.
- Length – 6.,31 m, minimum mark for Athens 2004
- 100 meters – 11.79s achieved in the semifinals of London 2012

Xavi also holds the Spanish record in the high jump after passing the bar at 1.41 m.

=== Paralympic Games ===
Along with his guide Antonio Delgado, Xavi attended his first Paralympic Games ( Athens 2004 ), competing in three disciplines: 100m, 200m sprint and the long jump, finishing 9th in the long jump with a personal best in the 200 meters of 24.60 seconds. Four years later, he attended the 2008 Beijing Paralympic Games, where the triple jump was confirmed to be his best discipline, to the detriment of the 200 m sprint. This change was providential because it enabled him to hang his first Paralympic medal, a bronze, with his eyes on the track at that time, his guide Raul Sabaté. In London 2012, he completed his third consecutive Games, participating in four disciplines and getting together with his current guide Enric Martín, two fifth places in the final triple jump (12,19m) and length (6,08m) as best records, and an eleventh place in the 100m which is his best so far (11,79s) and a record of Spain in the semifinals of the 4 × 100 m relay with a time of 43,26s.

=== IPC World Championship ===
His first participation was in Quebec 2003, achieving a fourth position in the long jump for best performance. Three years later, in Assen 2006, he was proclaimed the world champion in the triple jump with a mark of 13.02m, (his best) as well as obtained a bronze medal in length (6,08m). That same season, he participated in the Indoor World Championships in Bollnas (Suecia 2006), proclaiming himself world champion in the triple jump with a mark of 12,77m, world record indoor category; besides winning two silver in the long jump (6,03m) and 60m (7,60s). After an injury which deprived him of competing at his level the following year at the World São Paulo Games, (Brasil 2007) where he participated in the triple jump getting a creditable sixth position, Xavi Porras had to wait until the World Cup in Nueva Zelanda 2011, to become a champion of the long jump with a mark of 5.99m; while he was getting a new bronze medal as a member of the Spanish 4 × 100 relay team with Martín Parejo Maza (T11), MaximilianoÓscar Rodríguez Magi (T12) and Gerard Descarrega Puigdevall (T12) with a mark of 45.45. In Lyon (Francia 2013), he came back to the podium with a bronze medal in the long jump, with 6,24 m.

=== Europe championships ===
His international debut came in a European Championship (Lisboa 1999), obtaining, with his first guide, Sergio Segón, a creditable fourth position in the 100 meters, which reaffirmed his commitment to the sport, to the detriment of football, his passion as a child. But his international explosion came two years later, in the championship of Bialastok (Polonia 2001), where he was proclaimed runner-up in the 100 meters and the 4 × 100 relay. Two years later, in Assen 2003, he repeated his performance with two new bronze medals in the long jump (6,06m) and 4x100 respectively, becoming one of the best European sprinters and jumpers and endorsing his status in the championships of Espoo (Finlandia 2005) where, in addition to greatly improving his brand in length, he was proclaimed runner-up with a record of 6,19m and brushes the podium in the final of the 100 meters. His next continental appointment was Rhodes (Grecia 2009), which added three more medals on a brilliant performance: gold in the triple jump (12,76m), silver in length (5,90m) and bronze in the 100 (11.90"). In his sixth appearance in a European Championships, Swansea (Wales 2014), he returned to the podium getting his ninth continental medal, bronze in the long jump with a mark of 5,93m, which put the icing on the cake of a great 2014, when he won back the crown of Spain as a champion in the 100 meter sprint in 2012 and became a national runner-up in the long jump.

== Medal Template ==
He competed in the 2004 Summer Paralympics in Athens, Greece, the 2008 Summer Paralympics in Beijing, China, where he was the third best athlete in the triple jump. He competed at the 2012 Summer Paralympics, where he finished fifth in the triple jump.

=== Paralympics Games ===
(1 medal Bronze )

London 2012

- 8 September 2012, 100m semifinal, 11,79s (11th position)
- 6 September 2012, Triple jump, 12,19m (5th position)
- 5 September 2012, 4 × 100 m relay semifinal 43,26s (1st position) / disqualified in the final
- 4 September 2012, Long jump, 6,08m, (5th position)

Beijing 2008

- 15 September 2008, Long jump, 5,96m, (4th place)
- 12 September 2008, Triple jump, 12,71m, Bronze medal
- 8 September 2008, 100m (17th place)

Athens 2004

- 23 September 2004, 200m, 24,61s (14th place)
- 21 September 2004, 100m, 12,20s (15th place)
- 19 September 2004, Long jump, 5,79m, (9th place)

=== World Championship ===
(2 gold, 3 silver y 3 bronze)

World Championship in Lyon (France) 2013

- 07.27.2013, Long jump, 6,24m, Bronze medal
- 25 July 2013, 100m, 12,09s (14th place)
- 24 July 2013, Triple jump, 12,32m (6th place)
- 07.23.2013, 4 × 100 m Final, 45,00s, (4th place)

World Championships in Christchurch (New Zealand) 2011

- 29 January 2011, Long jump, 5,99m, Silver Medal
- 27 January 2011, 4 × 100 m relay final, 45,45s, Bronze medal
- 26 January 2011, Triple jump, 12,45m (4th place)
- 22 January 2011, 100m, 12,15s (12th place)

World Championship in São Paulo (Brazil) 2007

- Triple Jump, 11,60m (6th place)

World Championship in Assen (Netherlands) 2006

- 9 September 2006, Triple jump, 13,02m, Gold medal
- 6 September 2006, Long jump, 6,08m, Bronze medal
- 4 September 2006, 100m semifinals, 11,99s

Visa World Cup in Manchester (England) 2006

- 7 May 2006, Long jump, 5,69m, (5th place)

World Championships indoor in Bollnas (Sweden) 2006

- 24 March 2006, Triple jump, 12,77m, Gold medal
- 25 March 2006, Long jump, 6,03m, Silver medal
- 24 March 2006, 60 meters 7,60s, Silver medal

World Championship in Quebec (Canada) 2003

- Long Jump (4th place)

=== European Championships ===
(2 gold, 4 silver, 4 bronze)

European Championship in Grosseto (Italy) 2016

- 14 June 2016 Long jump, 6,14m, Gold medal

European Championships in Swansea (Wales) 2014

- 19 August 2014 Long jump, 5,93m, Bronze medal

European Championship in Rhodes (Greece) 2009

- Triple jump 12,76m, Gold medal
- Long jump, 5,90m, Silver medal
- 100m, 11,90s, Bronze medal

European Championships in Espoo (Finland) 2005

- 26 August 2005, Long Jump, 6,19m, Silver medal
- 23 August 2005, 100m final, 12,24s, (4th place)
- 22 August 2005, 100m semifinals, 12,05s

European Championships in Assen (Netherlands) 2003

- Long jump, 6,06m, Bronze medal
- 4 × 100 m Relay, Bronze medal

European Championship in Białystok (Poland) 2001

- 100m, Silver Medal
- 4 × 100 m relay, Silver medal
- 200m (5th place)

European Championships in Lisbon (Portugal) 1999

- 100m (4th place)
- 200m, finalist
