= Elvin Astanov =

Azerbaijani Paralympic athlete (born 1979)

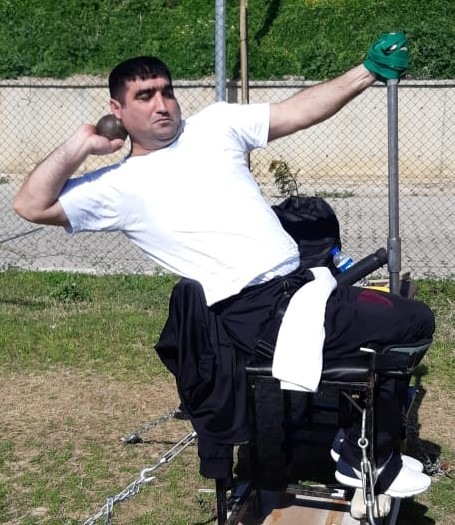
- Elvin Astanov in 2022

Personal information
- Nationality: Azerbaijani
- Born: 5 July 1979 (age 47)

Sport
- Sport: Paralympic athletics
- Disability class: F53
- Event: shot put
Medal record
Men's athletics
Representing Azerbaijan
Paralympic Games
Gold medal – first place	2020 Tokyo	Shot put F53
European Championships
Gold medal – first place	2021 Bydgoszcz	Shot put F53

Elvin Astanov (born 5 July 1979) is an Azerbaijani Paralympic athlete. He made his first Paralympic appearance representing the Azerbaijan at the 2020 Summer Paralympics.

He clinched gold medal at the age of 42 in the men's F53 shot put event during the 2020 Summer Paralympics.
