= Karim Sardarov =

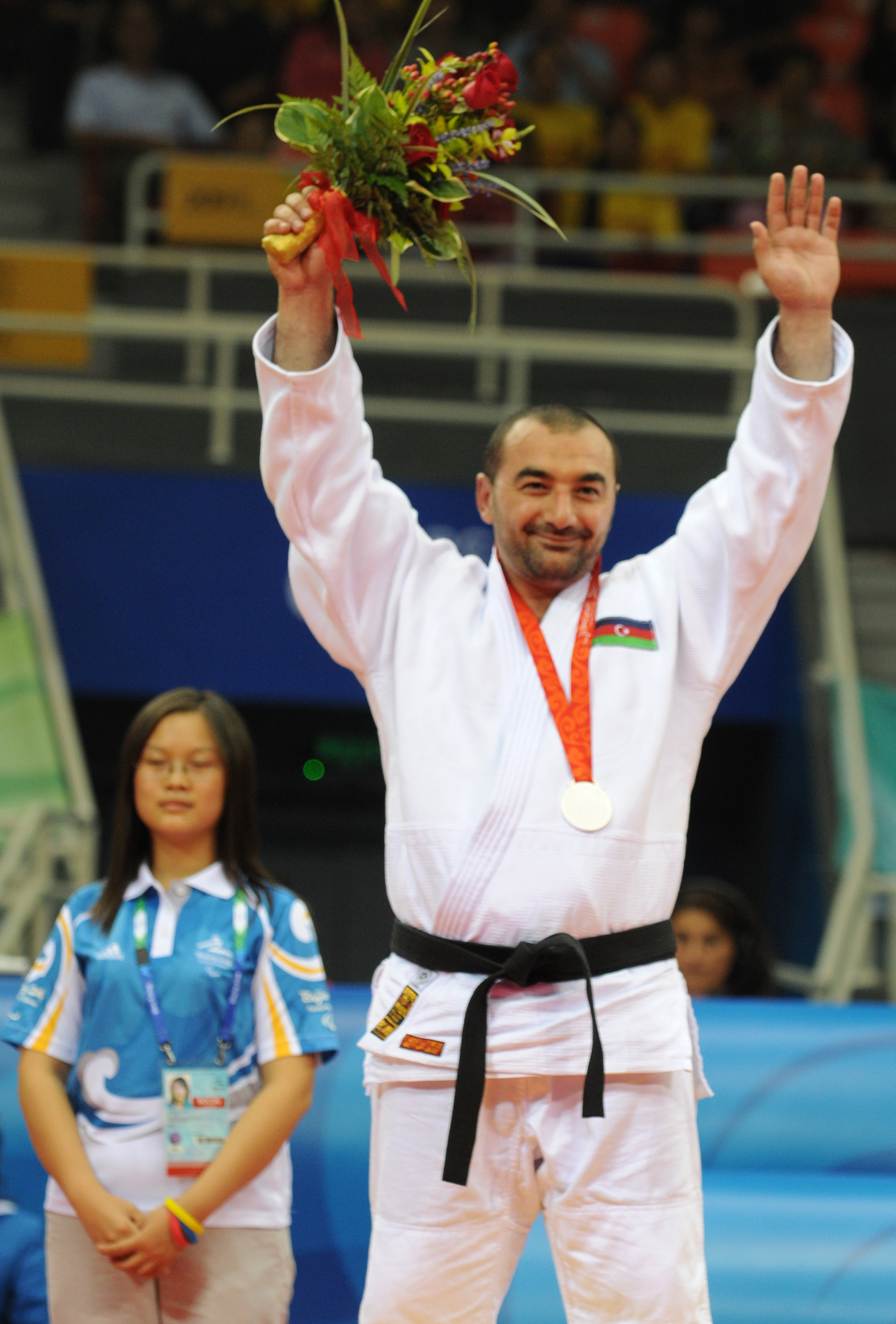
- Sardarov at the 2008 Summer Paralympics

Personal information
- Native name: Kərim Sərdarov
- Born: 6 July 1974 (age 51) Sumgait, Azerbaijan SSR, Soviet Union

Sport
- Sport: Judo
Medal record
Representing Azerbaijan
Paralympic Games
Silver medal – second place	2008 Beijing	Judo

Karim Aligulu oglu Sardarov (Azerbaijani: Kərim Əliqulu oğlu Sərdarov; born 6 July 1974) is an Azerbaijani Paralympic judoka competing in the up to 100 kg weight class and B3 visual impairment category. He is the European Champion (2009), a silver medalist of the 2008 Summer Paralympics, and represented Azerbaijan at the 2012 Summer Paralympics. He is also a bronze medalist at the 2005 European Judo Championship.

== Biography ==
Karim Sardarov was born on 6 July 1974, in Sumgait, Azerbaijan SSR. He graduated from secondary school No. 27 in Sumgait and the Azerbaijan State Academy of Physical Education and Sport.

In 2011, for his contributions to the development of the Paralympic movement in Azerbaijan, he was awarded the Taraggi Medal by a decree of the President of Azerbaijan. In 2016, on the occasion of the 20th anniversary of the establishment of the National Paralympic Committee of Azerbaijan and for his achievements in developing the Paralympic movement, Sardarov was awarded the Honorary Diploma of the President of Azerbaijan by a presidential decree.

His personal coach is Ahmaddin Rajabli.
