= Rza Osmanov =

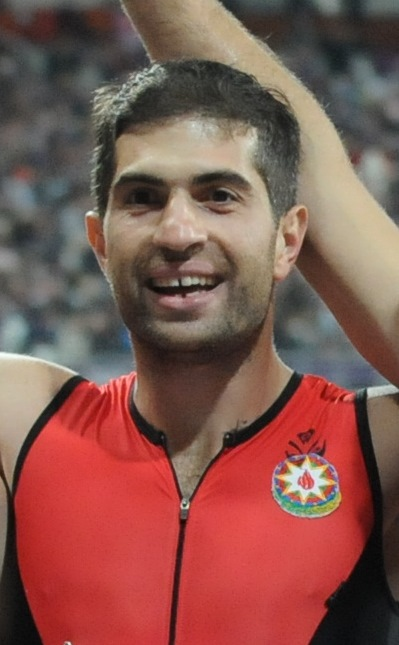
- Osmanov at the 2012 Summer Paralympics

Personal information
- Born: 26 November 1983 (age 42)
Medal record
Representing Azerbaijan
Paralympic Games
Bronze medal – third place	2012 London	4 × 100 m (T12)
Bronze medal – third place	2008 Beijing	400m (T12)

Rza Fikrat oglu Osmanov (Azerbaijani: Rza Fikrət oğlu Osmanov; born 26 November 1983) is an Azerbaijani Paralympic athlete competing in the T12 category. He is a bronze medalist in the 400 meters at the 2008 Summer Paralympics and in the 4×100 meters relay at the 2012 Summer Paralympics. Osmanov won the 2012 IPC Athletics European Championships in the men's 4×100 meters relay. and earned a bronze medal in the long jump (T12 category) at the 2013 IPC Athletics World Championships.

In 16 February 2011, Osmanov was awarded the Taraggi Medal by the President of Azerbaijan for his contributions to the development of the Paralympic movement in Azerbaijan.

On 14 September 2012, he was awarded the Honorary Diploma of the President of Azerbaijan by a presidential decree.
