= Irada Aliyeva =

Azerbaijani Paralympic athlete (born 1991)

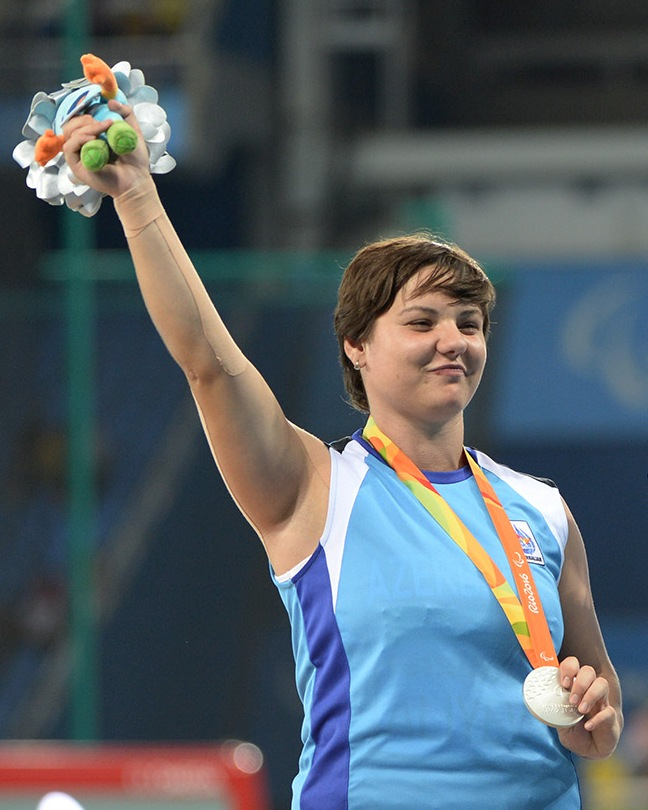
- At the 2016 Summer Paralympics

Personal information
- Full name: Irada Azad gizi Aliyeva
- Nationality: Azerbaijanis
- Citizenship: Azerbaijan
- Born: İradə Azad qızı Əliyeva; 27 December 1991 (age 34) Baku, Azerbaijan
- Height: 162 cm (5 ft 4 in)
- Weight: 74 kg (163 lb)

Sport
- Country: Azerbaijan
- Sport: Athletics
- Club: Neftchi (Baku)
- Coached by: Bakhtiar Zeynalov
Medal record
Javelin throw
Representing Azerbaijan
Paralympic Games
Silver medal – second place	2016 Rio de Janeiro	Women's javelin throw – F12/13
IPC Athletics World Championships
Gold medal – first place	2015 Doha	Women's javelin throw F13

Irada Azad gizi Aliyeva (Azerbaijani: İradə Azad qızı Əliyeva) is an Azerbaijani paralympic athlete, appearing in the category F12 blindness. World Cup winner among Paralympians 2015. Irada represented Azerbaijan at the 2016 Summer Paralympic Games in Rio de Janeiro, which won the silver medal.

== Biography ==
Irada Aliyeva was born 27 December 1991 in Baku in a family of athletes. So, Aliyeva's mother was engaged in cycling and motorcycling, and grandmother – acrobatics. Initially, Irada wanted to be professionally engaged in volleyball, but could not due to a small increase, preferring javelin throw. According to the most Aliyeva, javelin throw is a complex discipline, and she likes to "take up the challenges".Irada graduated from high school number 310 and the Academy of Physical Education and Sports in Baku.

== Career ==
Aliyeva began performing in 2005. In 2009, she decided to take a break from the sport, but in 2014 returned to the sport. In 2015 she took part in the first European Games in Baku in healthy javelin throw. At this tournament Aliyeva with the result of 36.99 m took the 10th place. In the same year she won the Grand Prix championship in Tunisia and Baku javelin. In October 2015 at the World Championships in Doha, Qatar Irada Aliyeva won the gold medal in the javelin, setting a new world record (44.18 m) and also became the owner of the permit for the 2016 Summer Paralympic Games in Rio de Janeiro. At the Paralympic Games Aliyeva in the F12 / 13 category in the best attempt has thrown a spear on 42.58 meters and finished second. In September 2016 Aliyeva decree of President of Azerbaijan Ilham Aliyev for high achievements at the 2016 Summer Paralympic Games in Rio de Janeiro, as well as for merits in development of the Azerbaijani sport was awarded the Order "For Service to the Fatherland" III degree.
