= Parvin Mammadov =

Azerbaijani Paralympic powerlifter

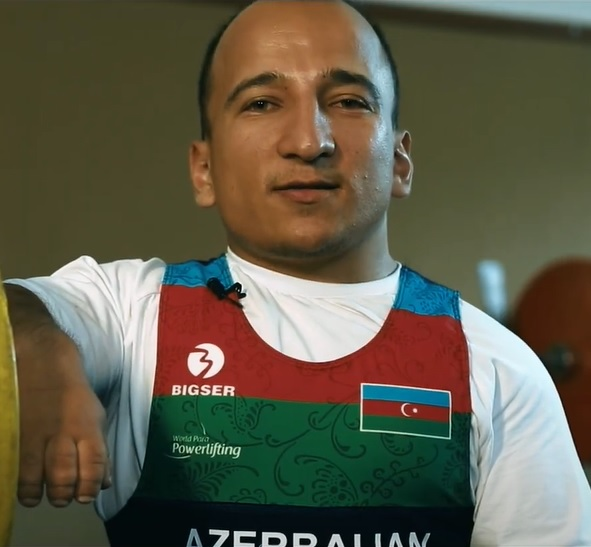

Personal information
- Nationality: Azerbaijan
- Born: 16 February 1995 (age 31) Baku, Azerbaijan
- Weight: 48 kg (106 lb)

Sport
- Sport: Para powerlifting
Medal record
Men's para powerlifting
Representing Azerbaijan
Paralympic Games
Bronze medal – third place	2020 Tokyo	-49 kg

Parvin Mammadov (born 16 February 1995) is an Azerbaijani Paralympic powerlifter. He won bronze in the Men's 49 kg at the 2020 Summer Paralympics.

On October 16, 2026, he was awarded the "Tereggi" medal for contributions to the development of sports and the Paralympic movement.
