= Maharram Aliyev =

Azerbaijani politician (born 1951)

Maharram Aliyev Məhərrəm Əliyev

Deputy Minister of Justice of the Republic of Azerbaijan
- In office June 5, 2017 – 2019

Head of the Defense Affairs Department of the Defense Assistant to the President of the Republic of Azerbaijan
- In office November 30, 2012 – June 1, 2017
- Preceded by: office established
- Succeeded by: office abolished

Personal details
- Born: October 20, 1951 (age 75) Maxta, Norashen District, Nakhchivan ASSR, Azerbaijan SSR, USSR
- Relatives: Adil Aliyev
- Awards

Military service
- Rank: colonel-general

Maharram Abish oghlu Aliyev (Azerbaijani: Məhərrəm Abış oğlu Əliyev, born October 20, 1951) is the Deputy Minister of Justice of the Republic of Azerbaijan, Head of the Defense Affairs Department of the Defense Assistant to the President of the Republic of Azerbaijan (2019 – 2023), Colonel-General. Currently, he is the Extraordinary and Plenipotentiary Ambassador of the Republic of Azerbaijan to the Republic of Belarus.

== Biography ==
Maharram Aliyev was born on October 20, 1951, in the village of Maxta, Nakhchivan ASSR. He has served in the Internal Affairs Ministry since 1973. After graduating from the Moscow Special Secondary Militia School in 1978, he was appointed to the post of criminal operations officer in the 131st police station of the city militia department.

In 1980-1992, he served in various positions in the criminal investigation structures of the district police departments of Baku. In 1985, he graduated from the All-Union Institute of Correspondence Law of the USSR Ministry of Internal Affairs. He held senior positions in the Nizami, Sabunchu, Khatai and Sabail district police departments of Baku. From November 1993 to June 2007, he was the Chief of the Baku Main Police Department.

In 2007-2011, he served as Ambassador Extraordinary and Plenipotentiary of Azerbaijan to Tajikistan.

By the Order of the President of the Republic of Azerbaijan dated November 30, 2012, he was admitted to active military service with the military rank of lieutenant general. In 2012-2017, he worked as the head of the Defense Affairs Department of the Defense Assistant to the President of the Republic of Azerbaijan.

By the Order of the President of the Republic of Azerbaijan dated June 5, 2017, he was appointed Deputy Minister of Justice of the Republic of Azerbaijan. In November 2019, he was appointed Assistant to the President for Military Affairs.

== Awards ==
- Shohrat Order — October 19, 2021
- Azerbaijani Flag Order — December 24, 1998
- For service to the Fatherland Order (3rd degree) — June 24, 2014
- Medal "For the Motherland" — June 25, 2013
