= Vugar Mehdiyev =

Azerbaijani Paralympic athlete

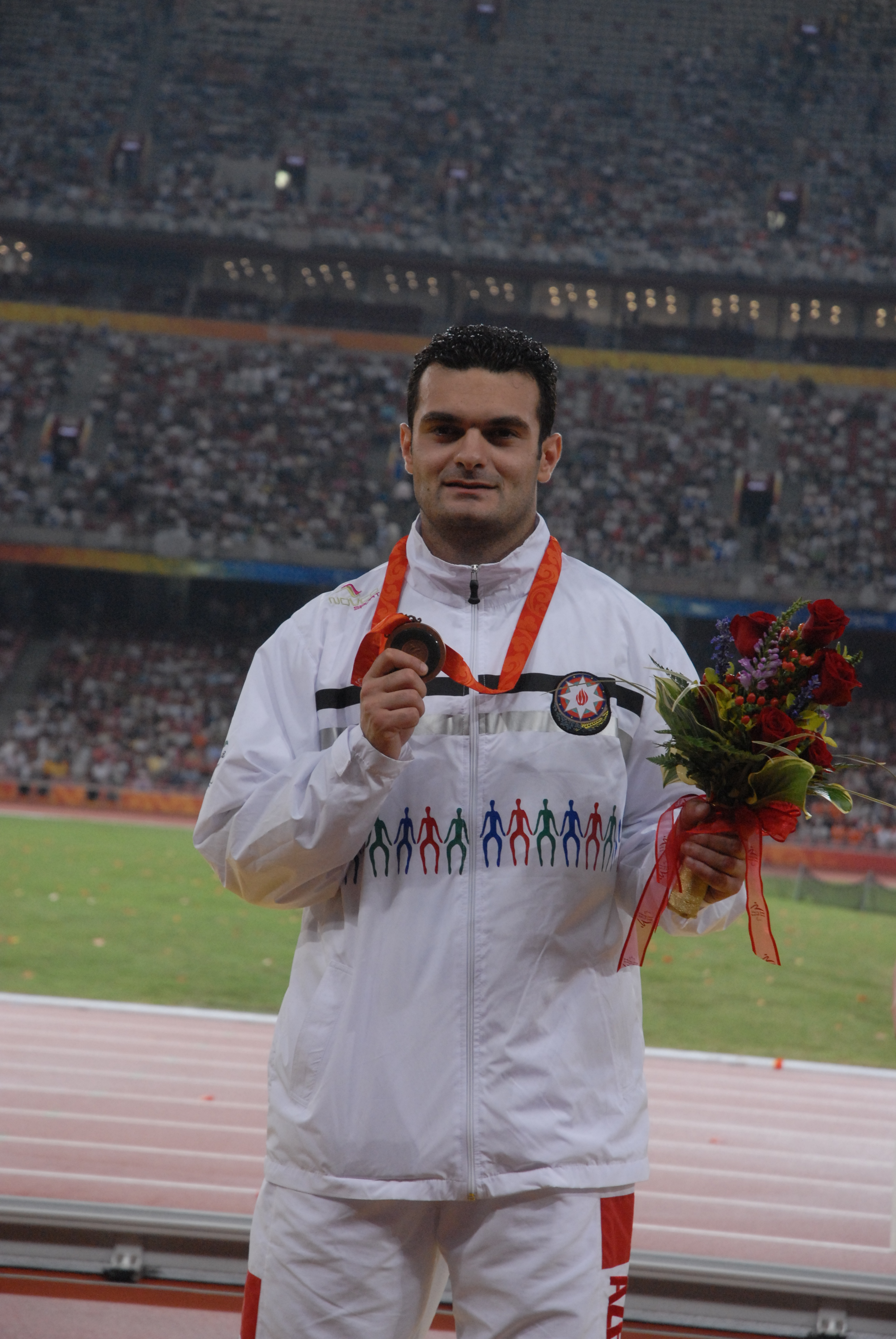

Medal record

Track and field (T13)

Representing Azerbaijan

Paralympic Games
Bronze medal – third place	2008 Beijing	200m - T13

Vugar Mehdiyev is an Azerbaijani track and field athlete competing mainly in category T13 sprint events.

He competed in the 2008 Summer Paralympics in Beijing, China. There he won a bronze medal in the men's 200 metres - T13 event and finished fourth in the men's 100 metres - T13 event
