= Samir Nabiyev =

Azerbaijani Paralympic athlete (1986)

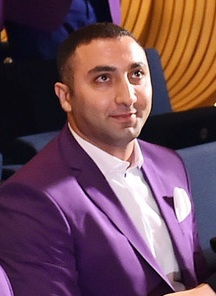
- Nabiyev in July 2016

Personal information
- Native name: Samir Nəbiyev
- Born: 27 February 1986 (age 40) Shamkir, Azerbaijan SSR, Soviet Union

Sport
- Sport: Athletics
Medal record
Representing Azerbaijan
Islamic Solidarity Games
| Gold medal – first place | 2017 Baku | Discus throw (F57) |
| Gold medal – first place | 2017 Baku | Shot put (F57) |

Samir Zilfi oglu Nabiyev (Azerbaijani: Samir Zilfi oğlu Nəbiyev; born 27 February 1986) is an Azerbaijani Paralympic athlete specializing in the F57 disability category. He has competed in three Paralympic Games, finishing 5th at the 2012 Summer Paralympics and 7th at both the 2016 Summer Paralympics and 2020 Summer Paralympics. He is the winner of the 2011 World Games in discus throw, a silver medalist at the 2013 IPC Athletics World Championships in discus throw (F57 wheelchair category), and a bronze medalist at the 2015 IPC Athletics World Championships in discus throw (F57 wheelchair category).

== Biography ==
Samir Nabiyev was born on 27 February 1986, in Shamkir. As a child, he suffered from osteomyelitis of the legs caused by an unsuccessful vaccination. When he was five years old, his parents encouraged him to take up sports. In 2010, Nabiyev began training in athletics professionally in Baku under coach Mukhtar Shakhtakhtinsky.

In 2011, Nabiyev won the discus throw event at the World Games in Sharjah. At the 2012 Summer Paralympics in London, he placed 5th in discus throw with a result of 44.78 meters. In 2013, at the 2013 IPC Athletics World Championships in Lyon, he achieved a throw of 45.77 meters, earning a silver medal.

In 2015, Nabiyev won bronze in the discus throw at the 2015 IPC Athletics World Championships in Doha with a result of 44.34 meters. He also competed in the shot put at the same championship, achieving a result of 13.62 meters and placing 6th.

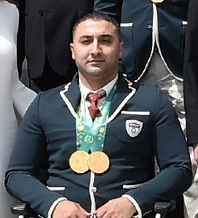
Samir Nabiyev in 2017 with medals from the 4th Islamic Solidarity Games

At the 2016 Summer Paralympics in Rio de Janeiro, Nabiyev competed in the shot put and finished 7th with a result of 13.67 meters. Two years later, at the 2018 European Championships in Berlin, he won silver in the shot put with a result of 13.54 meters.

In March 2017, Nabiyev won the IX Fazza Grand Prix in the UAE. At this event, he set a new European record in the discus throw with a result of 46.67 meters, surpassing his previous record of 44.56 meters. That same year, at the 2017 Islamic Solidarity Games in Baku, Nabiyev won two gold medals. He placed first in the shot put with a result of 13.95 meters, and in the discus throw with a result of 45.17 meters.

In 2019, at the World Championships in Dubai, Nabiyev placed 4th in the shot put with a result of 14.06 meters. This result earned him direct qualification for the 2020 Summer Paralympics in Tokyo. At the Tokyo Games, competing in the F57 category, Nabiyev achieved a best throw of 13.12 meters in the discus, finishing 7th among 15 participants.
