= Elshan Huseynov =

Azerbaijani Paralympic powerlifter

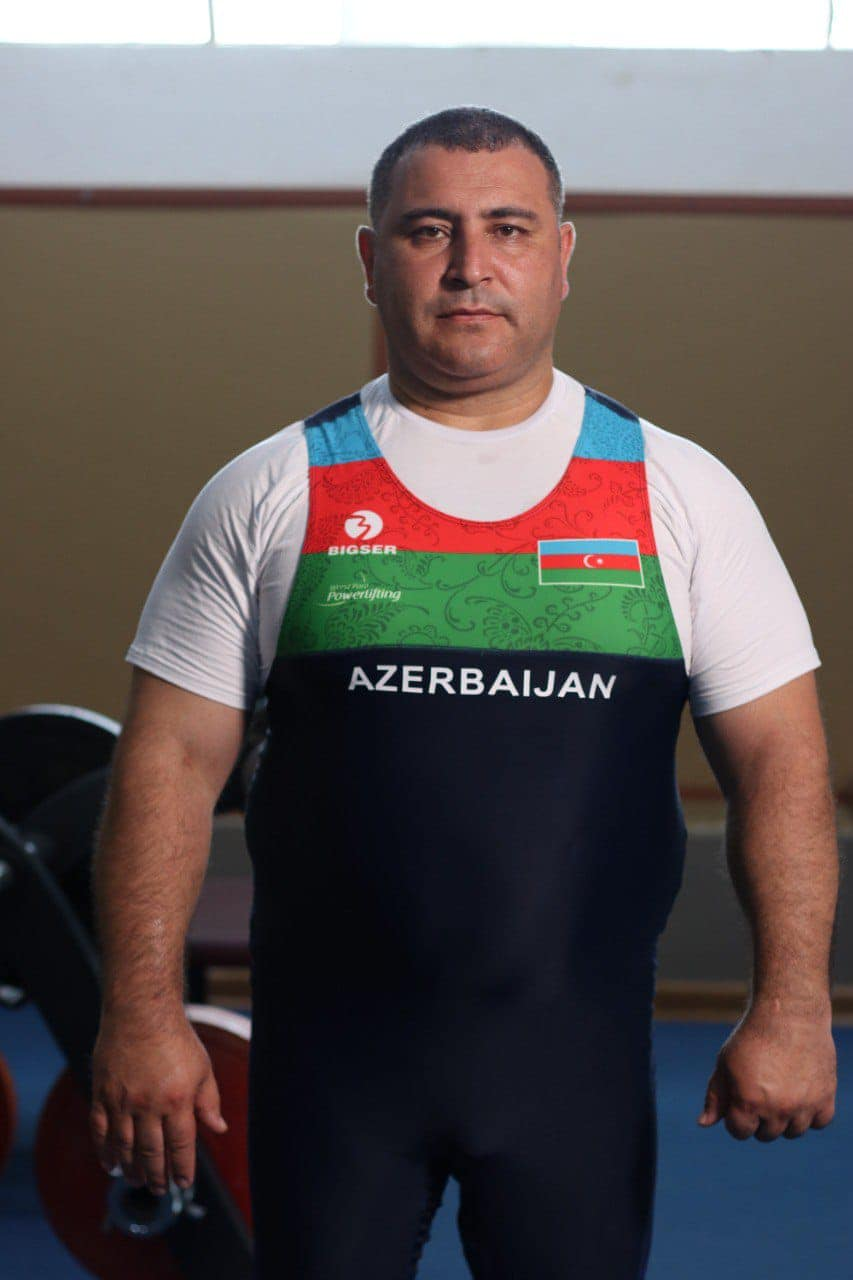

Personal information
- Born: November 21, 1977 (age 48) Sumgayit, Azerbaijan

Sport
- Country: Azerbaijan
- Sport: Powerlifting
- Event: up to 107 kg
Medal record
World Championships
Bronze medal – third place	2010 Kuala Lumpur	100 kg
Bronze medal – third place	2014 Dubai	-107 kg
European Championships
Gold medal – first place	2013 Alexin	107 kg
Silver medal – second place	2015 Eger	107 kg

Elshan Huseynov (Azerbaijani: Elşən Hüseynov; born 21 November 1977) — Azerbaijani paralympic powerlifter. He won bronze at the 2010 World Championships in Kuala Lumpur. He also won gold medal at the 2013 Open European Championships in Alexin. At this competition Huseynov lifted 225 kg, which was a new World and European Record.

Elshan Huseynov represented Azerbaijan at the 2008 Summer Paralympics in Beijing, where he took 5th place, and at the 2012 Summer Paralympics in London, where he took 4th place with a result of 230 kg.

He was included in the National Paralympic Committee of Azerbaijan's top 10 athletes of 2010.
