= Elchin Muradov =

Azerbaijani Paralympic sprinter (born 1989)

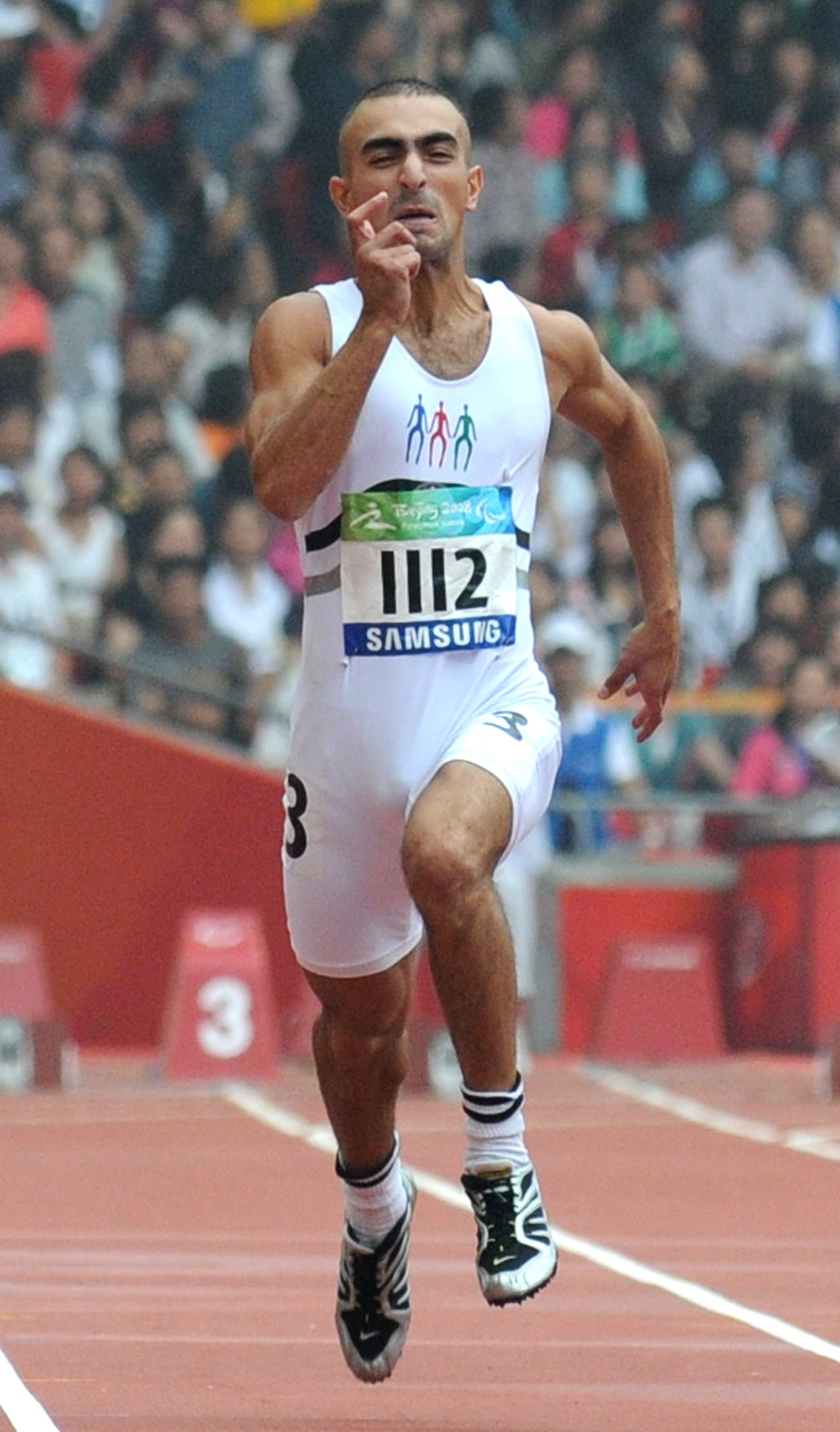

Personal information
- Nationality: Azerbaijan
- Citizenship: Azerbaijani
- Born: 1 September 1989 (age 36) Baku

Sport
- Sport: Athletics

Elchin Muradov is an Azerbaijani Paralympic athlete competing in the T11 blindness category. Participant of the 2008 Summer Paralympics and bronze medalist of the 2012 Summer Paralympics in the 4×100 meters relay. Silver medalist of the 2011 World Championships and 2012 European champion in the 100 m, European champion in the 4×100 meters relay. On June 19, 2010, he broke the world record in the 100 m running in the T12 category (10.66 sec)

In 2016, for his services to the development of the Paralympic movement in Azerbaijan, Ibrahimov was awarded the Honorary Diploma of the President of the Republic of Azerbaijan in accordance with the decree of the President of Azerbaijan.

== See also ==
- Azerbaijan at the 2008 Summer Paralympics
- Azerbaijan at the 2012 Summer Paralympics
