= Zeynidin Bilalov =

Azerbaijani Paralympic athlete

Medal record

Track and field (athletics)

Representing Azerbaijan

Paralympic Games
Silver medal – second place	2004 Athens	Triple Jump - F11
Silver medal – second place	2008 Beijing	Triple Jump - F11

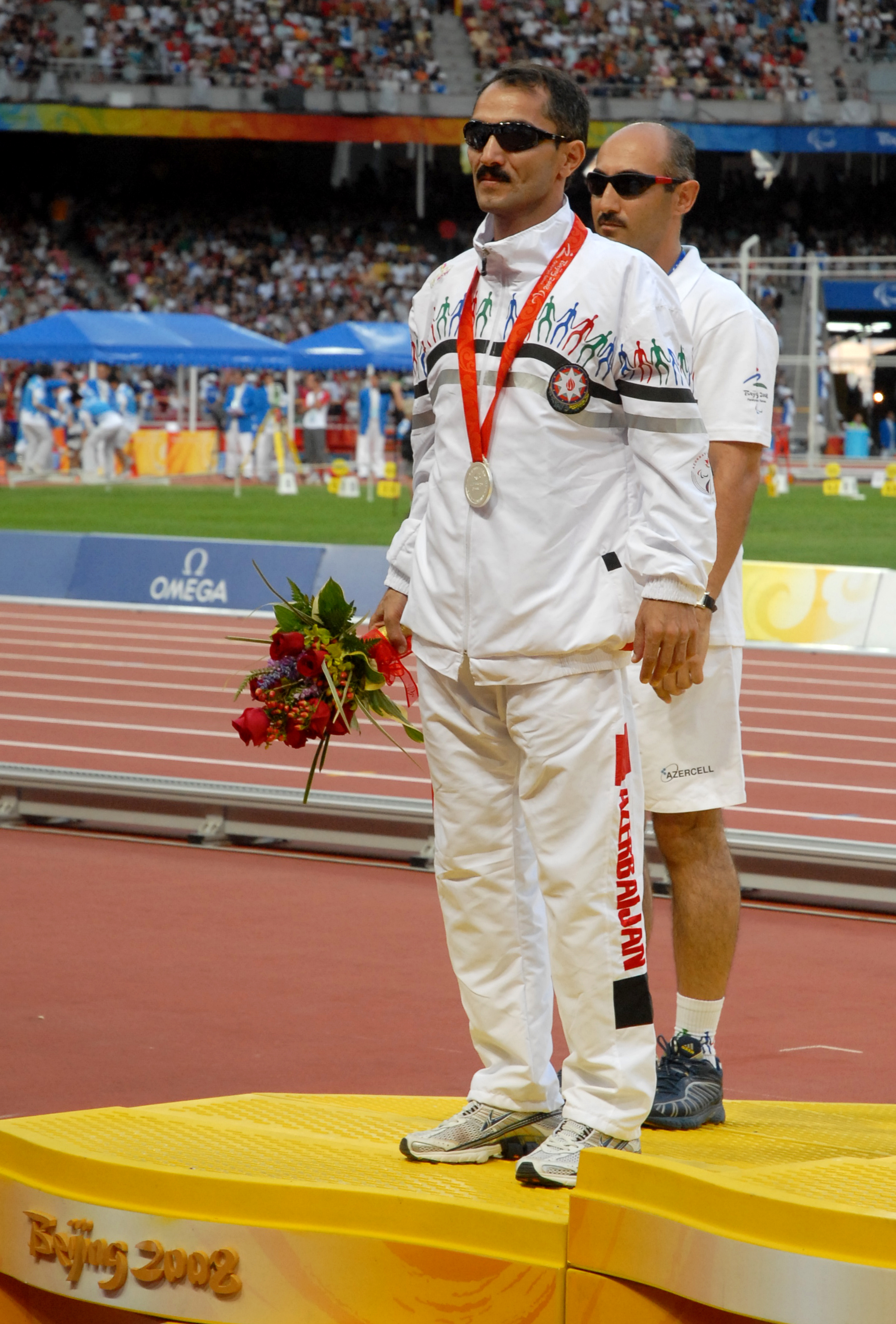
Zeynidin Bilalov at 2008 Paralympics

Zeynidin Bilalov is a Paralympian athlete from Azerbaijan competing mainly in category F11 long and triple jump events.

Bilalov has competed in three Paralympics. In his first in 2000 where despite competing in the f11 long jump and T11 100m came away with no medals. In the 2004 edition in Athens he again failed to medal in the T11 100m or F11 long jump he did win a silver medal in the F11 triple jump. He repeated this medal winning feet in Beijing in the 2008 Summer Paralympics but failed in his attempt to help Azerbaijan win a medal in the T11-13 4 × 100 m.
