= Oleg Panyutin =

Azerbaijani Paralympic athlete

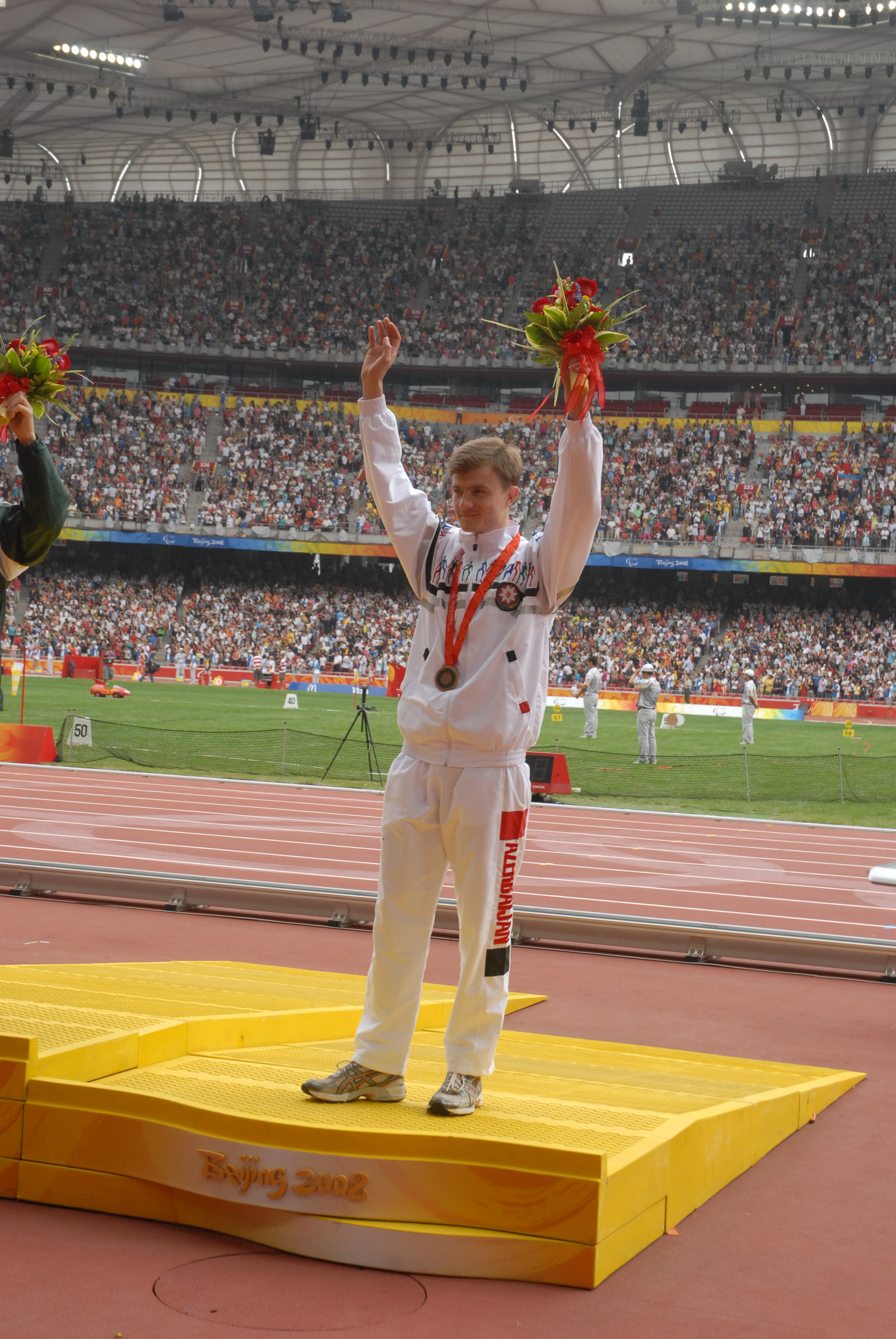

Medal record

Paralympic athletics

Representing Azerbaijan

Paralympic Games
Gold medal – first place	2004 Athens	Long Jump – F12
Gold medal – first place	2012 London	Triple Jump – F12
Bronze medal – third place	2008 Beijing	Long Jump – F12
Bronze medal – third place	2012 London	4 × 100 m relay

IPC World Championships
Gold medal – first place	2011 Christchurch	Long jump F13
Gold medal – first place	2011 Christchurch	Triple jump F12
Silver medal – second place	2006 Assen	Long jump F12

IPC European Championships
Gold medal – first place	2005 Espoo	Long Jump – F12
Gold medal – first place	2012 Stadskanaal	4 × 100 m relay
Silver medal – second place	2014 Swansea	Long jump T12

Oleg Panyutin (Azerbaijani: Oleq Panyutin, born 10 May 1983, in Baku, Azerbaijan SSR) is a Paralympian athlete from Azerbaijan competing mainly in category F12 long jump events.

Oleg competed in the 2004 Summer Paralympics in the T12 100 and 200 metres and won the F12 long jump gold medal. In 2008 he attempted to defend his title but only managed third in the F12 long jump winning the bronze medal.

== Career ==
=== Coaching ===
At the 2024 Summer Paralympics in Paris, the athletes coached by Oleg Panyutin won 4 medals: 3 gold and 1 silver. By the decree of the President of the Republic of Azerbaijan, Ilham Aliyev, on September 10, 2024, Panyutin was awarded the 1st degree Order of Labor for his outstanding achievements at the 2024 Summer Paralympic Games and his contributions to the development of Azerbaijani sports.
