= Olokhan Musayev =

Azerbaijani Paralympic athlete

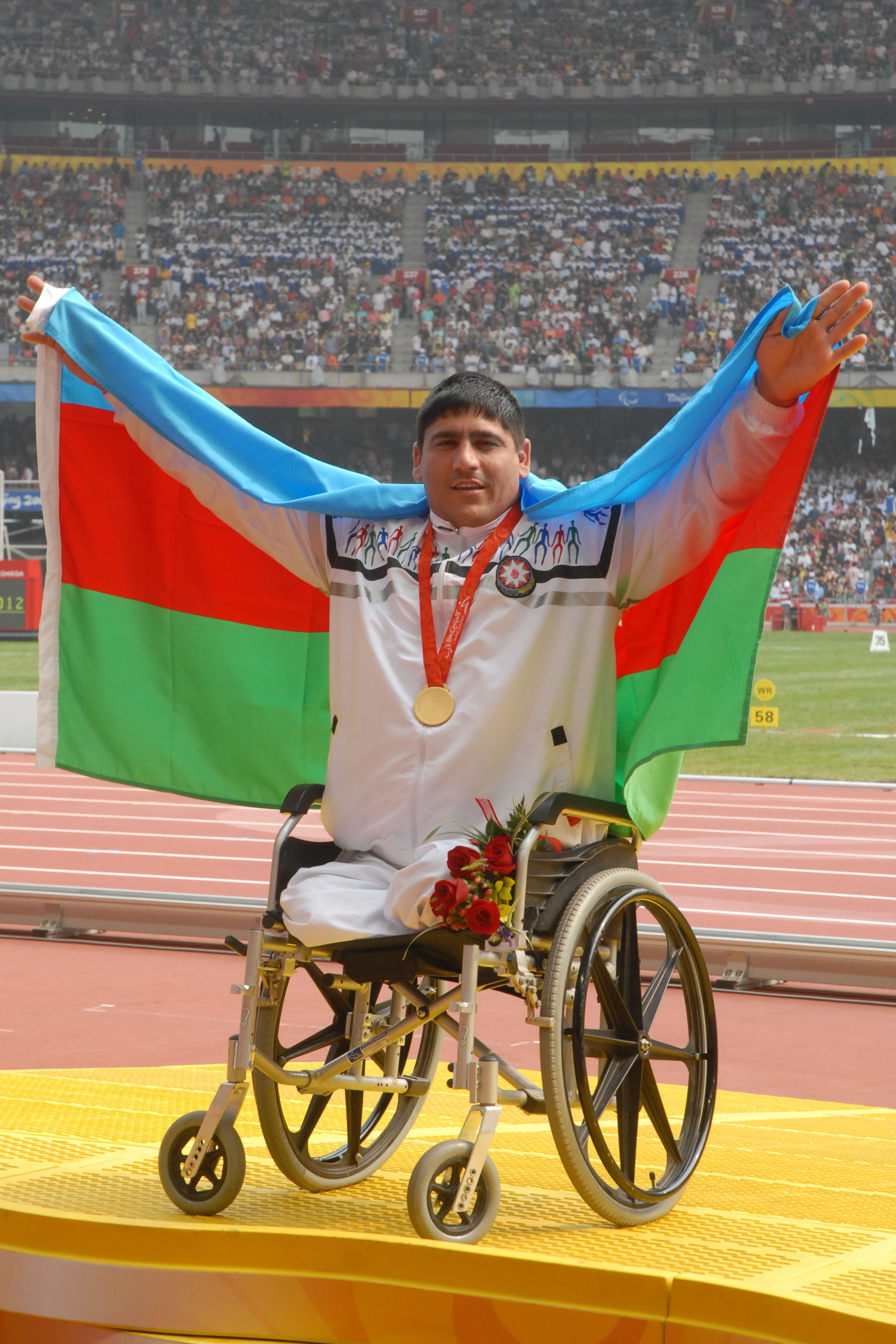

Medal record

Paralympic athletics

Representing Azerbaijan

Paralympic Games
Gold medal – first place	2008 Beijing	Shot put – F55–56

IPC European Championships
Gold medal – first place	2014 Swansea	Discus – F56

Olokhan Musayev (born 1979 in Balakan Rayon, Azerbaijan SSR) is a Paralympian athlete from Azerbaijan competing mainly in category F55–56 shot put events.

He competed in the 2008 Summer Paralympics in Beijing, China. There he won a gold medal in the men's F55–56 shot put event.

On October 16, 2026, he was awarded the "Tereggi" medal for contributions to the development of sports and the Paralympic movement.
