= Ilham Zakiyev =

Azerbaijani Paralympic judoka (born 1980)

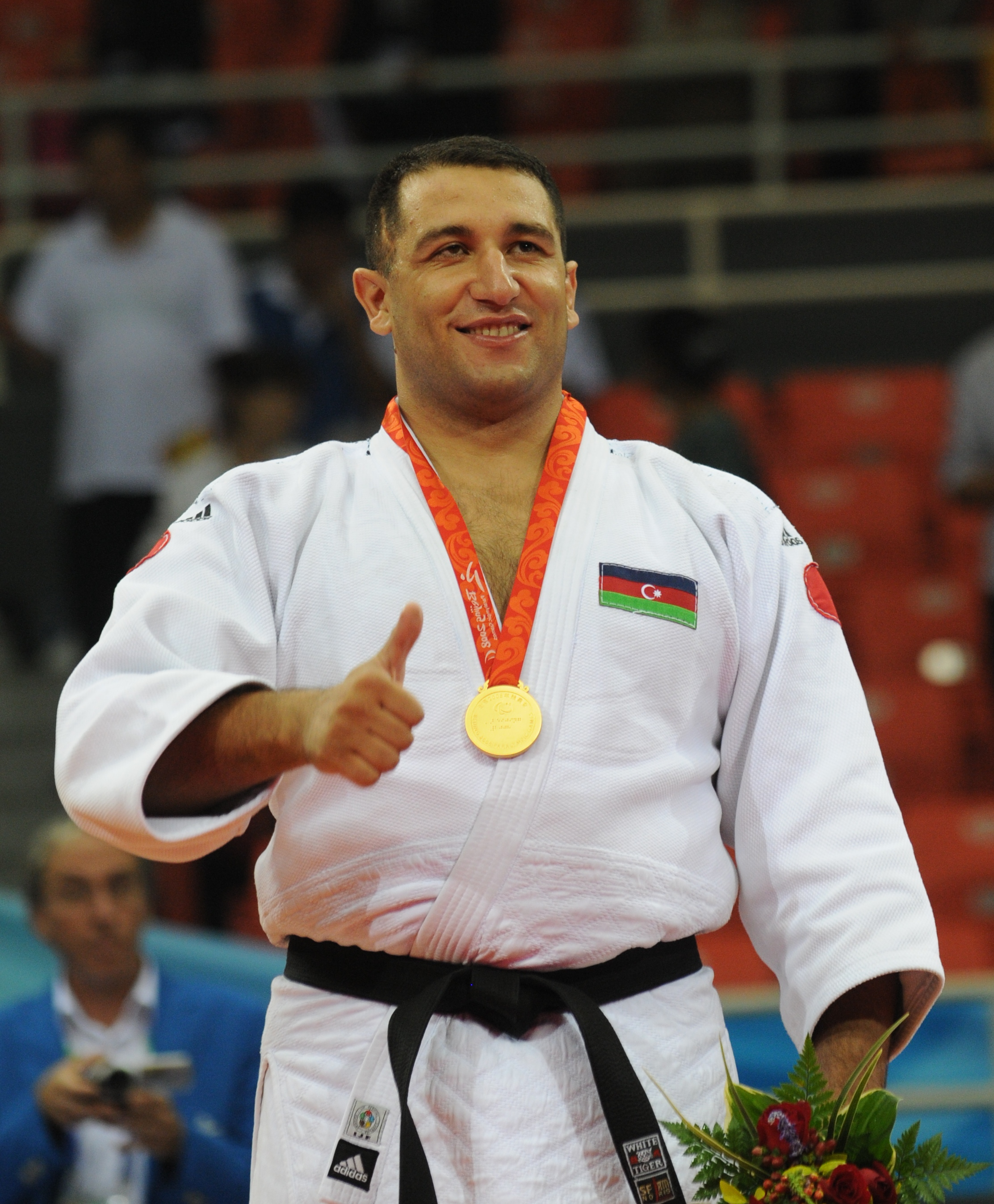
- Zakiyev at 2008 Beijing Paralympics

Personal information
- Native name: İlham Əzizağa oğlu Zəkiyev
- Full name: Ilham Azizaga oglu Zakiyev
- Born: 3 March 1980 (age 46) Sumgayit
- Education: School N5 in Sumgayit
- Occupation: Judoka

Sport
- Country: Azerbaijan
- Sport: Paralympic judo
- Disability: Blind
- Disability class: B1
- Rank: 7th dan black belt
- Coached by: Ibragim Ibragimov
Medal record
Men's paralympic judo
Representing Azerbaijan
Paralympic Games
Gold medal – first place	2004 Athens	+100 kg
Gold medal – first place	2008 Beijing	+100 kg
Bronze medal – third place	2012 London	+100 kg
Bronze medal – third place	2020 Tokyo	+100 kg
Bronze medal – third place	2024 Paris	+90 kg J1
IBSA World Championships
Gold medal – first place	2007 São Paulo	+100 kg
Gold medal – first place	2010 Antalya	+100 kg
Gold medal – first place	2022 Baku	team
Silver medal – second place	2011 Antalya	+100 kg
Silver medal – second place	2022 Baku	+90 kg, J1
Bronze medal – third place	2003 Quebec	+100 kg
Bronze medal – third place	2006 Brommat	+100 kg
Bronze medal – third place	2018 Odivelas	+100 kg
Bronze medal – third place	2018 Odivelas	team
European Games
Gold medal – first place	2015 Baku	+90 kg
European Para Championships
Silver medal – second place	2023 Rotterdam	+90 kg, J1
IBSA European Championships
Gold medal – first place	2005 Vlaardingen	+100 kg
Gold medal – first place	2007 Baku	+100 kg
Gold medal – first place	2009 Debrecen	+100 kg
Gold medal – first place	2011 Crawley	+100 kg
Gold medal – first place	2013 Budapest	+100 kg
Gold medal – first place	2015 Odivelas	+100 kg
Gold medal – first place	2017 Walsall	+100 kg
Gold medal – first place	2022 Cagliari	+90 kg, J1
Gold medal – first place	2025 Tbilisi	+95 kg
Silver medal – second place	2019 Genova	+100 kg
Islamic Solidarity Games
Bronze medal – third place	2017 Baku	+100 kg

Profile at external databases
- IJF: 11963, 64970
- JudoInside.com: 89894
- Updated on 22 August 2023

Ilham Azizaga oglu Zakiyev (Azerbaijani: İlham Zəkiyev, born 3 March 1980, Sumgayit) is an Azerbaijani blind Paralympic judoka.

== Career ==
He began studying judo when he was 11 years of age. In 1998, when he was 18, he went to serve in Azerbaijani army in the Aşağı Əbdürrəhmanlı village of Fizuli Rayon. He served on the frontline of the conflict zone. On 4 February 1999, he was wounded by a bullet to the head by an Armenian sniper, while on a combat mission. The bullet passed through the entire head, entering from the left and exiting via the right temple. As a result, Zakiyev has completely lost his eyesight. After a long rehabilitation he returned to the sport but as a Paralympian. He is the holder of a 7-dan black belt.

He won a gold medal in the 2004 Athens Paralympics and the 2008 Beijing Paralympics in the +100 kg division. Zakiyev has been European champion eight times, and has twice been the World champion.

=== 2024 ===
In 2024, Ilham Zakiyev represented Azerbaijan at the Summer Paralympics held in Paris. He competed in the J1 category in the +90 kg weight class and won a bronze medal.

By the decree of President Ilham Aliyev on September 10, 2024, Ilham Zakiyev was awarded 50,000 manats for securing third place at the Summer Paralympics, while his coach received 25,000 manats. In another decree issued on the same day, Zakiyev was also honored with the 2nd-degree Order for Service to the Fatherland.

== Personal life ==
In 2008, Zakiyev received the Shohrat Order for his services in the development of Azerbaijani sport.

He is an avid supporter of Neftchi Baku.
