= National Paralympic Committee of Azerbaijan =

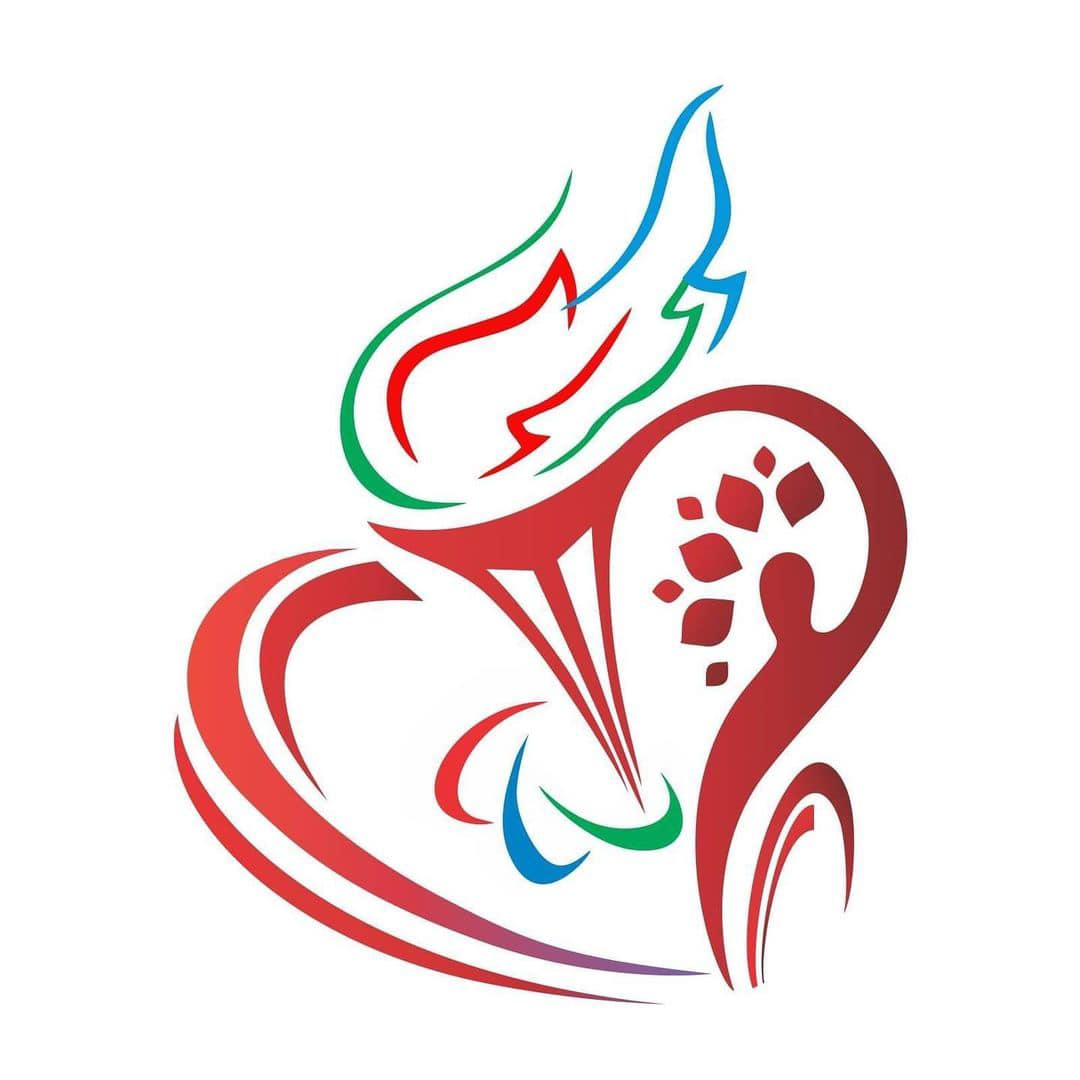

National Paralympic Committee
- Country: Azerbaijan
- Code: AZE
- Created: 1996
- Recognized: 1996
- Continental association: EPC
- Headquarters: Baku
- President: Hidayat Abdullayev
- Website: www.paralympic.az

The National Paralympic Committee of Azerbaijan (ANPC, Azerbaijani: Azərbaycan Milli Paralimpiya Komitəsi) is the Paralympic committee representing the Republic of Azerbaijan in the International Paralympic movement.

== History ==
The committee was established on February 9, 1996. On the same day, at the Congress, Ilgar Rahimov was elected president of ANPC, and Afig Suleymanov was elected general secretary.

For the first time Azerbaijan was represented at the Paralympic Games in 1996 in Atlanta by two athletes.

According to order of President of Azerbaijan Heydar Aliyev, a new Paralympic Sport Complex was founded in Sumgait on August 28, 2008.

The "Strategic Action Plan" of the National Paralympic Committee for the next 4 years (2013 - 2016) was approved in 2013. The plan reflected the development of professional sports, improvement of organizational management, strengthening of material technical base, cooperation with international sports organizations in preparation for the XV Summer Paralympic Games to be held in Rio de Janeiro in 2016.

On September 27, 2014, a Children's Paralympic Committee was established under ANPC. The purpose of the committee is to train reserve athletes by involving children with poor health in sports and to ensure their integration into society through rehabilitation. The board of directors consists of 13 people.

== Cooperation ==
Cooperation is carried out with the International Paralympic Committee, UNICEF Azerbaijan, BP and others.

Financial support is provided by Ministry of Youth and Sports of Azerbaijan, Ministry of Labour and Social Protection of Population of Azerbaijan, "Neftchi" Sports Health Center, "Sarhadchi" Olympic Sports Complex etc.

Currently, the number of sports is 16.

== See also ==
- Azerbaijan at the Paralympics
