= Event winners at the 2016 Summer Paralympics =

Rio de Janeiro, Brazil

The 2016 Summer Paralympics are running from Wednesday 7 September to Sunday 18 September, in Rio de Janeiro, Brazil. This is a chronological summary of the major events that took place during the course of the Games.

== Calendar ==
All dates are Brasília Time (UTC–3)

OC	Opening ceremony	●	Event competitions	1	Gold medal events	CC	Closing ceremony

September		7 Wed	8 Thu	9 Fri	10 Sat	11 Sun	12 Mon	13 Tue	14 Wed	15 Thu	16 Fri	17 Sat	18 Sun	Events
Ceremonies		OC											CC	—N/a
Archery					●	1	1	1	1	1	2	2		9
Athletics			10	20	16	19	14	19	14	20	15	25	5	177
Boccia					●	●	3	●	●	●	4			7
Paracanoe									●	6				6
Cycling	Road								18	6	5	4		50
Cycling	Track		4	5	5	3								50
Equestrian (dressage)						●	●	1	2	2	6			11
Football	5-a-side			●		●		●		●		1		2
Football	7-a-side		●		●		●		●		1			2
Goalball			●	●	●	●	●	●	●	●	2			2
Judo			4	4	5									13
Powerlifting			2	3	3	3	3	3	3					20
Rowing				●	●	4								4
Sailing							●	●	●	●	●	3		3
Shooting			2	2	2	1	1	2	2					12
Sitting volleyball				●	●	●	●	●	●	●	1	1		2
Swimming			16	16	14	15	16	15	15	14	16	15		152
Table tennis			●	●	●	5	8	8	●	●	4	4		29
Paratriathlon					3	3								6
Wheelchair basketball			●	●	●	●	●	●	●	●	1	1		2
Wheelchair fencing							2	4	4	2	2			14
Wheelchair rugby									●	●	●	●	1	1
Wheelchair tennis				●	●	●	●	1	1	2	2			6
Daily medal events		0	38	50	48	54	48	54	50	54	65	61	6	528
Cumulative total		0	38	88	136	190	238	292	342	396	461	522	528	528
September		7 Wed	8 Thu	9 Fri	10 Sat	11 Sun	12 Mon	13 Tue	14 Wed	15 Thu	16 Fri	17 Sat	18 Sun	Events

== Medal table ==
* Host nation (Brazil)

2016 Summer Paralympics medal table
Rank	NPC	Gold	Silver	Bronze	Total
1	China	107	81	51	239
2	Great Britain	64	39	44	147
3	Ukraine	41	37	39	117
4	United States	40	44	31	115
5	Australia	22	30	29	81
6	Germany	18	25	14	57
7	Netherlands	17	19	26	62
8	Brazil*	14	29	29	72
9	Italy	10	14	15	39
10	Poland	9	18	12	39
11–83	Remaining	187	193	249	629
Totals (83 entries)		529	529	539	1,597

== Day 0 — Thursday 5 May ==
5 May 2017 — detailed results

Opening ceremony

- The opening ceremony of the 2016 Summer Paralympics took place on the evening of 7 September 2016 at the Maracanã Stadium, Rio de Janeiro, starting at 18:30 BRT (21:30 UTC).

== Day 1 — Thursday 8 September ==
=== Medals for day 1 ===
8 September 2016 — summary table

Sport	Event	Gold medalist(s)			Silver medalist(s)		Bronze medalist(s)		Ref
Sport	Event	Competitor(s)	NPC	Rec	Competitor(s)	NPC	Competitor(s)	NPC	Ref
Athletics	Men's 5000 metres T11	Samwel Mushai Kimani	Kenya		Odair Santos	Brazil	Wilson Bii	Kenya	
Athletics	Men's shot put F32	Athanasios Konstantinidis	Greece	PR	Lahouari Bahlaz	Algeria	Dimitrios Zisidis	Greece	
Athletics	Men's discus throw F52	Aigars Apinis	Latvia		Robert Jachimowicz	Poland	Velimir Sandor	Croatia	
Athletics	Men's long jump F11	Ricardo Costa de Oliveira	Brazil		Lex Gillette	United States	Ruslan Katyshev	Ukraine	
Athletics	Men's shot put F11–12	Kim Lopez Gonzalez	Spain		Saman Pakbaz	Iran	Roman Danyliuk	Ukraine	
Athletics	Women's shot put F57	Angeles Ortiz Hernandez	Mexico		Nassima Saifi	Algeria	Nadia Medjmedj	Algeria	
Athletics	Men's shot put F41	Niko Kappel	Germany		Bartosz Tyszkowski	Poland	Zhiwei Xia	China	
Athletics	Men's discus throw F37	Khusniddin Norbekov	Uzbekistan	WR	Mindaugas Bilius	Lithuania	Dong Xia	China	
Athletics	Women's long jump T45–47	Anna Grimaldi	New Zealand		Yunidis Castillo	Cuba	Carlee Beattie	Australia	
Athletics	Women's 100 metres T53	Lisha Huang	China		Hongzhuan Zhou	China	Angela Ballard	Australia	
Cycling (track)	Women's individual pursuit C1–3	Megan Giglia	Great Britain		Jamie Whitmore	United States	Alyda Norbruis	Netherlands	
Cycling (track)	Women's individual pursuit C4	Shawn Morelli	United States		Susan Powell	Australia	Megan Fisher	United States	
Cycling (track)	Women's individual pursuit C5	Sarah Storey	Great Britain		Crystal Lane	Great Britain	Samantha Bosco	United States	
Cycling (track)	Men's individual pursuit B	Steve Bate (Pilot: Adam Duggleby)	Great Britain		Vincent ter Schure (Pilot: Timo Fransen)	Netherlands	Stephen de Vries (Pilot: Patrick Bos)	Netherlands	
Judo	Women's 48 kg	Liqing Li	China		Carmen Brussig	Germany	Ecem Tasin	Turkey	
Judo	Women's 48 kg	Liqing Li	China		Carmen Brussig	Germany	Yuliya Halinska	Ukraine	
Judo	Men's 60 kg	Sherzod Namozov	Uzbekistan		Makoto Hirose	Japan	Alex Bologa	Romania	
Judo	Men's 60 kg	Sherzod Namozov	Uzbekistan		Makoto Hirose	Japan	Uugankhuu Bolormaa	Mongolia	
Judo	Women's 52 kg	Sandrine Martinet	France		Ramona Brussig	Germany	Cherine Abdellaoui	Algeria	
Judo	Women's 52 kg	Sandrine Martinet	France		Ramona Brussig	Germany	Sevinch Salaeva	Uzbekistan	
Judo	Men's 66 kg	Utkirjon Nigmatov	Uzbekistan		Bayram Mustafayev	Azerbaijan	Davyd Khorava	Ukraine	
Judo	Men's 66 kg	Utkirjon Nigmatov	Uzbekistan		Bayram Mustafayev	Azerbaijan	Satoshi Fujimoto	Japan	
Powerlifting	Men's 49 kg	Cong Le Van	Vietnam	WR	Omar Qarada	Jordan	Nandor Tunkel	Hungary	
Powerlifting	Women's 41 kg	Nazmiye Muratli	Turkey	WR	Zhe Cui	China	Ni Nengah Widiasih	Indonesia	
Shooting	Women's 10 metre air rifle standing SH1	Veronika Vadovicova	Slovakia		Cuiping Zhang	China	Yaping Yan	China	
Shooting	Men's 10 metre air rifle standing SH1	Dong Chao	China		Abdulla Sultan Alaryani	United Arab Emirates	Suwan Kim	South Korea	
Swimming	Men's 100 metre backstroke S6	Tao Zheng	China	WR	Hongguang Jia	China	Iaroslav Semenenko	Ukraine	
Swimming	Women's 100 metre backstroke S6	Lingling Song	China	WR	Dong Lu	China	Oksana Khrul	Ukraine	
Swimming	Men's 400 metre freestyle S8	Oliver Hynd	Great Britain	WR	Haijiao Xu	China	Yinan Wang	China	
Swimming	Women's 400 metre freestyle S8	Lakeisha Patterson	Australia	WR	Jessica Long	United States	Stephanie Millward	Great Britain	
Swimming	Men's 100 metre breaststroke SB9	Kevin Paul	South Africa		Denys Dubrov	Ukraine	Duncan van Haaren	Netherlands	
Swimming	Women's 100 metre breaststroke SB9	Lisa Kruger	Netherlands		Harriet Lee	Great Britain	Chantalle Zijderveld	Netherlands	
Swimming	Men's 100 metre freestyle S4	Gi Seong Jo	South Korea		Zhipeng Jin	China	Michael Schoenmaker	Netherlands	
Swimming	Women's 100 metre freestyle S3	Zulfiya Gabidullina	Kazakhstan	WR	Quiping Peng	China	Olga Sviderska	Ukraine	
Swimming	Men's 100 metre backstroke S14	In Kook Lee	South Korea		Marc Evers	Netherlands	Takuya Tsugawa	Japan	
Swimming	Women's 100 metre backstroke S14	Bethany Firth	Great Britain	WR	Marlou van der Kulk	Netherlands	Jessica-Jane Applegate	Great Britain	
Swimming	Men's 100 metre butterfly S13	Ihar Boki	Belarus	WR	Kirill Pankov	Uzbekistan	Muzaffar Tursunkhujaev	Uzbekistan	
Swimming	Women's 100 metre butterfly S13	Rebecca Meyers	United States	WR	Muslima Odilova	Uzbekistan	Fotimakhon Amilova	Uzbekistan	
Swimming	Men's 200 metre freestyle S5	Daniel Dias	Brazil		Roy Perkins	United States	Andrew Mullen	Great Britain	
Swimming	Women's 200 metre freestyle S5	Li Zhang	China		Teresa Perales	Spain	Sarah Louise Rung	Norway	
Swimming	Men's 100 metre backstroke S7	Ievgenii Bogodaiko	Ukraine		Jonathan Fox	Great Britain	Italo Pereira	Brazil	
Swimming	Women's 100 metre backstroke S7	Liting Ke	China		Ying Zhang	China	Rebecca Dubber	New Zealand	

== Day 2 — Friday 9 September ==
=== Medals for day 2 ===
9 September 2016 — summary table

Sport	Event	Gold medalist(s)			Silver medalist(s)		Bronze medalist(s)		Ref
Sport	Event	Competitor(s)	NPC	Rec	Competitor(s)	NPC	Competitor(s)	NPC	Ref
Athletics	Women's club throw F31–32	Maroua Brahmi	Tunisia	WR	Mounia Gasmi	Algeria	Gemma Prescott	Great Britain	
Athletics	Men's javelin throw F53–54	Manolis Stefanoudakis	Greece	PR	Luis Alberto Zepeda Felix	Mexico	Aliaksandr Tryputs	Belarus	
Athletics	Women's 100 metres T36	Yanina Andrea Martinez	Argentina		Claudia Nicoleitzik	Germany	Martha Liliana Hernandez Florian	Belarus	
Athletics	Women's long jump T43–44	Marie-Amelie Le Fur	France	WR	Stef Reid	Great Britain	Marlene van Gansewinkel	Netherlands	
Athletics	Women's shot put F41	Raoua Tlili	Tunisia		Samar Ben Koelleb	Tunisia	Claire Keefer	Australia	
Athletics	Men's 100 metres T13	Jason Smyth	Ireland		Johannes Nambala	Namibia	Chad Perris	Australia	
Athletics	Men's 400 metres T20	Daniel Martins	Brazil	WR	Luis Arturo Paiva	Venezuela	Gracelino Tavares Barbosa	Cape Verde	
Athletics	Men's 100 metres T35	Ihor Tsvietov	Ukraine		Fabio da Silva Bordignon	Brazil	Hernan Barreto	Argentina	
Athletics	Women's javelin throw F34	Lijuan Zou	China	WR	Marjaana Heikkinen	Finland	Frances Herrmann	Germany	
Athletics	Women's 100 metres T37	Georgina Hermitage	Great Britain	WR	Mandy Francois-Elie	France	Yescarly Medina	Venezuela	
Athletics	Men's javelin throw F42–44	Akeem Stewart	Trinidad and Tobago	WR	Alister McQueen	Canada	Rory McSweeney	New Zealand	
Athletics	Women's discus throw F11	Liangmin Zhang	China		Hongxia Tang	China	Izabela Campos	Brazil	
Athletics	Men's high jump T42	Mariyappan Thangavelu	India		Sam Grewe	United States	Bhati Varun Singh	India	
Athletics	Women's 100 metres T11	Libby Clegg (Guide: Chris Clarke)	Great Britain		Guohua Zhou (Guide: Dengpu Jia)	China	Cuiqing Liu (Guide: Donglin Xu)	China	
Athletics	Women's 100 metres T12	Omara Durand (Guide: Yuniol Kindelan)	Cuba		Elena Chebanu (Guide: Hakim Ibrahimov)	Azerbaijan	Katrin Mueller-Rottgardt (Guide: Sebastian Fricke)	Great Britain	
Athletics	Women's 100 metres T54	Wenjun Liu	China		Tatyana McFadden	United States	Yingjie Li	China	
Athletics	Men's 100 metres T53	Brent Lakatos	Canada		Pongsakorn Paeyo	Thailand	Huzhao Li	China	
Athletics	Men's 400 metres T12	Qichao Sun	China		Mahdi Afri	Morocco	Luis Goncalves	Portugal	
Athletics	Men's 100 metres T43–44	Jonnie Peacock	Great Britain	PR	Liam Malone	New Zealand	Felix Streng	Germany	
Athletics	Cycling (track)	Women's 1 km time trial B	Spohie Thornhill (Pilot: Helen Scott)	Great Britain	PR	Larissa Klassen (Pilot: Haliegh Dolman)	Netherlands	Jessica Gallagher (Pilot: Madison Janssen)	Australia
Men's 1 km time trial C4–5	Cycling (track)	Jody Cundy	Great Britain	PR	Jozef Metelka	Slovakia	Alfonso Cabello Llamas	Spain	
Men's individual pursuit C1	Cycling (track)	Zhangyu Li	China		Ross Wilson	Canada	Arnoud Nijhuis	Netherlands	
Men's individual pursuit C2	Cycling (track)	Guihua Liang	China		Tristen Chernove	Canada	Louis Rolfe	Great Britain	
Men's individual pursuit C3	Cycling (track)	David Nicholas	Australia		Joseph Berenyi	United States	Eoghan Clifford	Ireland	
Judo	Men's 73 kg	Ramil Gasimov	Azerbaijan		Dmytro Solovey	Ukraine	Feruz Sayidov	Uzbekistan	
Judo	Men's 73 kg	Ramil Gasimov	Azerbaijan		Dmytro Solovey	Ukraine	Nikolai Kornhass	Germany	
Judo	Men's 81 kg	Eduardo Adrian Avila Sanchez	Mexico		Jungmin Lee	South Korea	Rovshan Safarov	Azerbaijan	
Judo	Men's 81 kg	Eduardo Adrian Avila Sanchez	Mexico		Jungmin Lee	South Korea	Oleksandr Kosinov	Ukraine	
Judo	Women's 57 kg	Inna Cherniak	Ukraine		Lucia da Silva Teixeira Araujo	Brazil	Junko Hirose	Japan	
Judo	Women's 57 kg	Inna Cherniak	Ukraine		Lucia da Silva Teixeira Araujo	Brazil	Hana Seo	South Korea	
Judo	Women's 63 kg	Dalidaivis Rodriguez	Cuba		Iryna Husieva	Ukraine	Songlee Jin	South Korea	
Judo	Women's 63 kg	Dalidaivis Rodriguez	Cuba		Iryna Husieva	Ukraine	Tursunpashsha Nurmetova	Uzbekistan	
Powerlifting	Women's 45 kg	Dandan Hu	China	WR	Latifat Tijani	Nigeria	Zoe Newson	Great Britain	
Powerlifting	Men's 54 kg	Roland Ezuruike	Nigeria	PR	Jian Wang	China	Dimitrios Bakochristos	Greece	
Powerlifting	Men's 59 kg	Sherif Othman	Egypt	WR	Ali Jawad	Great Britain	Quanxi Yang	China	
Shooting	Women's 10 metre air pistol SH1	Sareh Javanmardidodmani	Iran		Olga Kovalchuk	Ukraine	Aysegul Pehlivanlar	Turkey	
Shooting	Men's 10 metre air pistol SH1	Chao Yang	China		Ju Hee Lee	South Korea	Server Ibragimov	Uzbekistan	
Swimming	Men's 100 metre backstroke S1	Hennadii Boiko	Ukraine	WR	Francesco Bettella	Italy	Anton Kol	Ukraine	
Swimming	Men's 100 metre backstroke S2	Liankang Zou	China	WR	Benying Liu	China	Serhii Palamarchuk	Ukraine	
Swimming	Women's 100 metre backstroke S2	Pin Xiu Yip	Singapore	WR	Yazhu Feng	China	Iryna Sotska	Ukraine	
Swimming	Men's 50 metre freestyle S7	Shiyun Pan	China	WR	Ievgenii Bogodaiko	Ukraine	Carlos Serrano Zárate	Colombia	
Swimming	Women's 50 metre freestyle S7	McKenzie Coan	United States	PR	Denise Grahl	Germany	Susannah Rodgers	Great Britain	
Swimming	Men's 50 metre butterfly S6	Quin Xu	China	WR	Tao Zheng	China	Wang Lichao	China	
Swimming	Women's 50 metre butterfly S6	Ellie Robinson	Great Britain	PR	Oksana Khrul	Ukraine	Tiffany Thomas Kane	Australia	
Swimming	Men's 50 metre freestyle S10	Maksym Krypak	Ukraine		Phelipe Rodrigues	Brazil	Denys Dubrov	Ukraine	
Swimming	Women's 50 metre freestyle S10	Aurelie Rivard	Canada	WR	Sophie Pascoe	New Zealand	Yi Chen	China	
Swimming	Men's 100 metre backstroke S11	Dmytro Zalevskyi	Ukraine	WR	Wojciech Makowski	Poland	Bradley Snyder	United States	
Swimming	Women's 100 metre backstroke S11	Mary Fisher	New Zealand	WR	Liwen Cai	China	Maja Reichard	Sweden	
Swimming	Men's 400 metre freestyle S9	Brenden Hall	Australia		Federico Morlacchi	Italy	Lewis White	Great Britain	
Swimming	Women's 400 metre freestyle S9	Nuria Marques Soto	Spain		Ellie Cole	Australia	Jialing Xu	China	
Swimming	Men's 100 metre butterfly S8	Maodang Song	China	WR	Haijaio Xu	China	Guanglong Yang	China	
Swimming	Women's 100 metre butterfly S8	Kateryna Istomina	Ukraine	PR	Stephanie Slater	Great Britain	Jessica Long	United States	
Swimming	Mixed 4 x 50 metre freestyle relay 20 pts	Quiping Peng; Shengnan Jiang; Wenpan Huang; Qing Xu	China		Clodoaldo Silva; Joana Maria Silva; Susana Ribeiro; Daniel Dias	Brazil	Andrii Derevinskyi; Viktoriia Savtsova; Olga Sviderska; Ievgenii Bogodaiko	Ukraine	

== Day 3 — Saturday 10 September ==
=== Medals for day 3 ===
Source:

== Day 4 — Sunday 11 September ==
=== Medals for day 4 ===
Source:

== Day 5 — Monday 12 September ==
=== Medals for day 5 ===
Source:

== Day 6 — Tuesday 13 September ==
=== Medals for day 6 ===
Source:

== Day 7 — Wednesday 14 September ==
=== Medals for day 7 ===
Source:

== Day 8 - Thursday 15 September ==
=== Medals for day 8 ===
Source:

== Day 9 - Friday 16 September ==
=== Medals for day 9 ===
Source:

== Day 10 - Saturday 17 September ==
=== Medals for day 10 ===
Source:

== Day 11 - Sunday 18 September ==
=== Medals for day 11 ===
Source:

== See also ==
- Chronological summary of the 2016 Summer Olympics
