= Swimming at the 2016 Summer Paralympics – Women's 100 metre freestyle =

The women's 100 metre freestyle swimming events for the 2016 Summer Paralympics take place at the Rio Olympic Stadium from 8 to 15 September. A total of nine events were contested for ten different classifications.

== Competition format ==
Each event consists of two rounds: heats and final. The top eight swimmers overall in the heats progress to the final. If there are eight or fewer swimmers in an event, no heats are held and all swimmers qualify for the final.

== Results ==
=== S3 ===
18:41 8 September 2016:

Rank	Lane	Name	Nationality	Time	Notes
1st place, gold medalist(s)	3	Zulfiya Gabidullina	Kazakhstan	1:30.07	WR
2nd place, silver medalist(s)	5	Qiuping Peng	China	1:34.71	
3rd place, bronze medalist(s)	4	Olga Sviderska	Ukraine	1:34.86	
4	6	Lisette Teunissen	Netherlands	1:39.77	
5	7	Guofen Meng	China	1:42.64	
6	2	Alexandra Stamatopoulou	Greece	1:47.16	
7	1	Patricia Valle	Mexico	1:57.86	
8	8	Maiara Regina Perreira Barreto	Brazil	2:11.54	

=== S5 ===
19:29 17 September 2016:

Rank	Lane	Name	Nationality	Time	Notes
1st place, gold medalist(s)	4	Li Zhang	China	1:18.85	
2nd place, silver medalist(s)	5	Teresa Perales	Spain	1:20.47	
3rd place, bronze medalist(s)	2	Joana Maria Silva	Brazil	1:23.21	
4	6	Cuan Yao	China	1:23.99	
5	3	Inbal Pezaro	Israel	1:24.04	
6	7	Sarah Louise Rung	Norway	1:25.04	
7	1	Mayumi Narita	Japan	1:26.39	
8	8	Bela Trebinova	Czech Republic	1:27.59	

=== S6 ===
17:36 17 September 2016:

Rank	Lane	Name	Nationality	Time	Notes
1st place, gold medalist(s)	4	Yelyzaveta Mereshko	Ukraine	1:11.40	WR
2nd place, silver medalist(s)	5	Viktoriia Savtsova	Ukraine	1:13.47	
3rd place, bronze medalist(s)	6	Ellie Robinson	Great Britain	1:14.43	
4	7	Lingling Song	China	1:14.46	
5	3	Eleanor Simmonds	Great Britain	1:15.77	
6	2	Tiffany Thomas Kane	Australia	1:17.56	
7	1	Emanuela Romano	Italy	1:18.34	
8	8	Vianney Trejo Delgadillo	Mexico	1:22.05	

=== S7 ===
17:36 16 September 2016:

Rank	Lane	Name	Nationality	Time	Notes
1st place, gold medalist(s)	4	McKenzie Coan	United States	1:09.99	
2nd place, silver medalist(s)	2	Cortney Jordan	United States	1:12.80	
3rd place, bronze medalist(s)	3	Yajing Huang	China	1:12.85	
4	6	Susannah Rodgers	Great Britain	1:12.92	
5	5	Denise Grahl	Germany	1:13.70	
6	1	Tess Routliffe	Canada	1:13.97	
7	7	Liting Ke	China	1:16.26	
8	8	Verena Schott	Germany	1:18.72	

=== S8 ===
19:36 11 September 2016:

Rank	Lane	Name	Nationality	Time	Notes
1st place, gold medalist(s)	3	Maddison Elliott	Australia	1:04.73	PR
2nd place, silver medalist(s)	5	Lakeisha Patterson	Australia	1:05.08	
3rd place, bronze medalist(s)	6	Stephanie Millward	Great Britain	1:05.16	
4	4	Jessica Long	United States	1:05.72	
5	7	Morgan Bird	Canada	1:09.67	
6	2	Cecilia Jerônimo de Araújo	Brazil	1:09.83	
7	1	Abi Tripp	Canada	1:10.40	
8	8	Mallory Weggemann	United States	1:11.80	

=== S9 ===
19:10 12 September 2016:

Rank	Lane	Name	Nationality	Time	Notes
1st place, gold medalist(s)	4	Michelle Konkoly	United States	1:00.91	WR
2nd place, silver medalist(s)	5	Sarai Gascon	Spain	1:02.81	
3rd place, bronze medalist(s)	3	Ellie Cole	Australia	1:02.93	
4	6	Nuria Marques Soto	Spain	1:03.94	
5	2	Jialing Xu	China	1:04.32	
6	1	Emily Beecroft	Australia	1:05.19	
6	7	Ashleigh McConnell	Australia	1:05.19	
8	8	Ping Lin	China	1:06.18	

=== S10 ===
18:16 13 September 2016:

Rank	Lane	Name	Nationality	Time	Notes
1st place, gold medalist(s)	4	Aurelie Rivard	Canada	59.31	PR
2nd place, silver medalist(s)	5	Sophie Pascoe	New Zealand	59.85	
3rd place, bronze medalist(s)	3	Elodie Lorandi	France	1:01.13	
4	2	Yi Chen	China	1:01.76	
5	6	Lisa Kruger	Netherlands	1:02.67	
6	7	Mariana Ribeiro	Brazil	1:02.75	
7	1	Marije Oosterhuis	Netherlands	1:02.78	
8	8	Stefanny Rubi Cristino Zapata	Mexico	1:03.54	

=== S11 ===
19:14 15 September 2016:

Rank	Lane	Name	Nationality	Time	Notes
1st place, gold medalist(s)	6	Qing Xie	China	1:08.03	
2nd place, silver medalist(s)	3	Guizhi Li	China	1:08.31	
3rd place, bronze medalist(s)	4	Liesette Bruinsma	Netherlands	1:08.55	
4	2	Mary Fisher	New Zealand	1:09.47	
5	5	Cecilia Camellini	Italy	1:10.39	
6	7	Maja Reichard	Sweden	1:10.53	
7	1	Maryna Piddubna	Ukraine	1:11.55	
8	8	Letticia Martinez	United States	1:14.09	

=== S13 ===
19:31 16 September 2016:

Rank	Lane	Name	Nationality	Time	Notes
1st place, gold medalist(s)	5	Anna Stetsenko	Ukraine	59.19	
2nd place, silver medalist(s)	6	Rebecca Meyers	United States	59.77	
3rd place, bronze medalist(s)	4	Hannah Russell	Great Britain	1:00.07	
4	3	Shokhsanamkhon Toshpulatova	Uzbekistan	1:00.41	
5	7	Fotimakhon Amilova	Uzbekistan	1:01.26	
6	2	Naomi Maike Schnittger	Germany	1:01.57	
7	1	Alessia Berra	Italy	1:02.16	
	8	Muslima Odilova	Uzbekistan		DSQ
