= Swimming at the 2016 Summer Paralympics – Women's 100 metre freestyle S13 =

Women's 100 metre freestyle S13 at the XV Paralympic Games
- Venue: Olympic Aquatics Stadium
- Dates: 16 September 2016
- Competitors: 19 from 10 nations

Medalists
| 1st place, gold medalist(s) | | Anna Stetsenko | Ukraine |
| 2nd place, silver medalist(s) | | Rebecca Meyers | United States |
| 3rd place, bronze medalist(s) | | Hannah Russell | Great Britain |

The women's 100 metre freestyle S13 event at the 2016 Paralympic Games took place on 16 September 2016, at the Olympic Aquatics Stadium. Two heats were held. The swimmers with the eight fastest times advanced to the final.

== Heats ==
=== Heat 1 ===
11:06 16 September 2016:

| Rank | Lane | Name | Nationality | Time | Notes |
|---|---|---|---|---|---|
| 1 | 4 | Rebecca Meyers | United States | 1:01.35 | Q |
| 2 | 3 | Jenna Jones | Australia | 1:02.75 | |
| 3 | 5 | Martha Ruether | United States | 1:03.10 | |
| 4 | 6 | Prue Watt | Australia | 1:04.29 | |
| 5 | 2 | Cailin Currie | United States | 1:05.33 | |
| 6 | 7 | Karina Petrikovicova | Slovakia | 1:06.18 | |

=== Heat 2 ===
11:10 16 September 2016:

| Rank | Lane | Name | Nationality | Time | Notes |
|---|---|---|---|---|---|
| 1 | 4 | Hannah Russell | Great Britain | 59.99 | Q |
| 2 | 5 | Naomi Maike Schnittger | Germany | 1:01.78 | Q |
| 3 | 3 | Alessia Berra | Italy | 1:02.29 | Q |
| 4 | 6 | Katja Dedekind | Australia | 1:04.59 | |
| 5 | 7 | Marian Polo Lopez | Spain | 1:05.37 | |
| 6 | 2 | Elena Krawzow | Germany | 1:06.89 | |

=== Heat 3 ===
11:13 16 September 2016:

| Rank | Lane | Name | Nationality | Time | Notes |
|---|---|---|---|---|---|
| 1 | 4 | Anna Stetsenko | Ukraine | 1:00.40 | Q |
| 2 | 5 | Shokhsanamkhon Toshpulatova | Uzbekistan | 1:01.07 | Q |
| 3 | 1 | Fotimakhon Amilova | Uzbekistan | 1:01.78 | Q |
| 4 | 2 | Muslima Odilova | Uzbekistan | 1:02.45 | Q |
| 5 | 3 | Joanna Mendak | Poland | 1:03.73 | |
| 6 | 6 | Ariadna Edo Beltran | Spain | 1:03.92 | |
| 7 | 7 | Marta Maria Gomez Battelli | Spain | 1:06.85 | |

== Final ==
19:31 16 September 2016:

| Rank | Lane | Name | Nationality | Time | Notes |
|---|---|---|---|---|---|
| 1st place, gold medalist(s) | 5 | Anna Stetsenko | Ukraine | 59.19 | |
| 2nd place, silver medalist(s) | 6 | Rebecca Meyers | United States | 59.77 | |
| 3rd place, bronze medalist(s) | 4 | Hannah Russell | Great Britain | 1:00.07 | |
| 4 | 3 | Shokhsanamkhon Toshpulatova | Uzbekistan | 1:00.41 | |
| 5 | 7 | Fotimakhon Amilova | Uzbekistan | 1:01.26 | |
| 6 | 2 | Naomi Maike Schnittger | Germany | 1:01.57 | |
| 7 | 1 | Alessia Berra | Italy | 1:02.16 | |
| | 8 | Muslima Odilova | Uzbekistan | | DSQ |
