= Swimming at the 2016 Summer Paralympics – Women's 50 metre freestyle =

The women's 50 metre freestyle swimming events for the 2016 Summer Paralympics take place at the Rio Olympic Stadium from 8 to 15 September. A total of ten events are contested for ten different classifications.

== Competition format ==
Each event consists of two rounds: heats and final. The top eight swimmers overall in the heats progress to the final. If there are eight or fewer swimmers in an event, no heats are held and all swimmers qualify for the final.

== Results ==
=== S4 ===
18:33 17 September 2016:

Rank	Lane	Name	Nationality	Time	Notes
1st place, gold medalist(s)	5	Rachael Watson	Australia	40.13	PR
2nd place, silver medalist(s)	6	Arjola Trimi	Italy	40.51	
3rd place, bronze medalist(s)	4	Nely Miranda Herrera	Mexico	40.53	
4	3	Zulfiya Gabidullina	Kazakhstan	42.34	
5	7	Jiao Cheng	China	43.13	
6	2	Patricia Pereira dos Santos	Brazil	43.92	
7	8	Lisette Teunissen	Netherlands	45.56	
8	1	Marila Lafina	Ukraine	48.31	

=== S5 ===
20:35 12 September 2016:

Rank	Lane	Name	Nationality	Time	Notes
1st place, gold medalist(s)	5	Li Zhang	China	36.87	
2nd place, silver medalist(s)	4	Joana Maria Silva	Brazil	37.13	
3rd place, bronze medalist(s)	7	Bela Trebinova	Czech Republic	37.37	
4	3	Teresa Perales	Spain	38.13	
5	6	Mayumi Narita	Japan	39.23	
6	2	Inbal Pezaro	Israel	39.73	
7	1	Sarah Louise Rung	Norway	40.42	
8	8	Anita Fatis	France	42.66	

=== S6 ===
17:50 10 September 2016:

Rank	Lane	Name	Nationality	Time	Notes
1st place, gold medalist(s)	4	Yelyzaveta Mereshko	Ukraine	33.43	PR
2nd place, silver medalist(s)	5	Viktoriia Savtsova	Ukraine	33.68	
3rd place, bronze medalist(s)	6	Tiffany Thomas Kane	Australia	34.41	
4	3	Ellie Robinson	Great Britain	35.24	
5	2	Lingling Song	China	35.25	
6	7	Eleanor Simmonds	Great Britain	35.54	
7	1	Nicole Turner	Ireland	36.31	
8	8	Emanuela Romano	Italy	36.62	

=== S7 ===
18:05 9 September 2016:

Rank	Lane	Name	Nationality	Time	Notes
1st place, gold medalist(s)	4	McKenzie Coan	United States	32.42	PR
2nd place, silver medalist(s)	5	Denise Grahl	Germany	33.16	
3rd place, bronze medalist(s)	6	Susannah Rodgers	Great Britain	33.26	
4	3	Cortney Jordan	United States	33.33	
5	7	Tess Routliffe	Canada	33.89	
6	2	Yajing Huang	China	34.12	
7	8	Sarah Mehain	Canada	34.57	
8	1	Liting Ke	China	35.62	

=== S8 ===
18:03 11 September 2016

Rank	Lane	Name	Nationality	Time	Notes
1st place, gold medalist(s)	5	Maddison Elliott	Australia	29.73	WR
2nd place, silver medalist(s)	6	Lakeisha Patterson	Australia	30.13	
3rd place, bronze medalist(s)	3	Jiang Shengnan	China	30.53	
4	2	Stephanie Slater	Great Britain	30.54	
5	4	Stephanie Millward	Great Britain	30.73	
6	8	Kateryna Istomina	Ukraine	31.05	
7	7	Morgan Bird	Canada	31.29	
8	1	Jin Xiaoqin	China	32.09	

=== S9 ===
19:55 13 September 2016:

Rank	Lane	Name	Nationality	Time	Notes
1st place, gold medalist(s)	4	Michelle Konkoly	United States	28.29	PR
2nd place, silver medalist(s)	5	Ellie Cole	Australia	29.13	
3rd place, bronze medalist(s)	6	Jiexin Wang	China	29.30	
4	7	Emily Beecroft	Australia	29.33	
5	2	Sarai Gascon	Spain	29.39	
6	3	Ping Lin	China	29.62	
7	1	Ashleigh McConnell	Australia	29.63	
8	8	Nuria Marques Soto	Spain	29.80	

=== S10 ===
18:35 9 September 2016:

Rank	Lane	Name	Nationality	Time	Notes
1st place, gold medalist(s)	4	Aurelie Rivard	Canada	27.37	WR
2nd place, silver medalist(s)	5	Sophie Pascoe	New Zealand	27.72	
3rd place, bronze medalist(s)	3	Yi Chen	China	28.21	
4	8	Chantalle Zijderveld	Netherlands	28.26	
5	6	Elodie Lorandi	France	28.34	
6	7	Chantal Molenkamp	Netherlands	28.93	
7	1	Mariana Ribeiro	Brazil	29.30	
8	2	Lina Watz	Sweden	29.69	

=== S11 ===
18:15 12 September 2016:

Rank	Lane	Name	Nationality	Time	Notes
1st place, gold medalist(s)	4	Guizhi Li	China	30.73	WR
2nd place, silver medalist(s)	5	Maja Reichard	Sweden	30.76	
3rd place, bronze medalist(s)	6	Maryna Piddubna	Ukraine	31.23	
3rd place, bronze medalist(s)	7	Liesette Bruinsma	Netherlands	31.23	
5	2	Cecilia Camellini	Italy	31.71	
6	3	Mary Fisher	New Zealand	31.80	
7	1	Qing Xie	China	32.00	
8	8	Liwen Cai	China	32.31	

=== S12 ===
18:06 17 September 2016:

Rank	Lane	Name	Nationality	Time	Notes
1st place, gold medalist(s)	4	Hannah Russell	Great Britain	27.53	
2nd place, silver medalist(s)	5	Naomi Maike Schnittger	Germany	28.38	
3rd place, bronze medalist(s)	3	María Delgado	Spain	29.03	
4	7	Anabel Moro	Argentina	30.01	
5	6	Maryna Stabrovska	Ukraine	30.02	
6	1	Belkis Mota	Venezuela	30.47	
7	2	Yaryna Matlo	Ukraine	30.65	
8	8	Emely Telle	Germany	30.87	

=== S13 ===
19:52 14 September 2016:

Rank	Lane	Name	Nationality	Time	Notes
1st place, gold medalist(s)	4	Anna Stetsenko	Ukraine	27.34	WR
2nd place, silver medalist(s)	3	Muslima Odilova	Uzbekistan	28.00	
3rd place, bronze medalist(s)	5	Shokhsanamkhon Toshpulatova	Uzbekistan	28.02	
4	7	Fotimakhon Amilova	Uzbekistan	28.21	
5	2	Joanna Mendak	Poland	28.35	
6	8	Rebecca Meyers	United States	28.58	
7	6	Jenna Jones	Australia	28.77	
8	1	Alessia Berra	Italy	29.01	
