= Swimming at the 2016 Summer Paralympics – Women's 100 metre butterfly S13 =

Women's 100 metre butterfly S13 at the XV Paralympic Games
- Venue: Olympic Aquatics Stadium
- Dates: 8 September 2016
- Competitors: 20 from 13 nations

Medalists
1st place, gold medalist(s)		Rebecca Meyers	United States
2nd place, silver medalist(s)		Muslima Odilova	Uzbekistan
3rd place, bronze medalist(s)		Fotimakhon Amilova	Uzbekistan

The women's 100 metre butterfly S13 event at the 2016 Paralympic Games took place on 8 September 2016, at the Olympic Aquatics Stadium. Three heats were held. The swimmers with the eight fastest times advanced to the final.

== Heats ==
=== Heat 1 ===
11:20 8 September 2016:

Rank	Lane	Name	Nationality	Time	Notes
1	4	Shokhsanamkhon Toshpulatova	Uzbekistan	1:06.77	Q
2	5	Anna Stetsenko	Ukraine	1:09.24	Q
3	3	Ariadna Edo Beltran	Spain	1:10.44	
4	6	Emely Telle	Germany	1:14.78	
5	2	Belkis Mota	Venezuela	1:15.60	
6	7	Alani Ferreira	South Africa	1:24.23	

=== Heat 2 ===
11:24 8 September 2016:

Rank	Lane	Name	Nationality	Time	Notes
1	3	Fotimakhon Amilova	Uzbekistan	1:04.72	WR Q
2	4	Rebecca Meyers	United States	1:04.94	Q
3	5	Alessia Berra	Italy	1:07.39	Q
4	6	Cailin Currie	United States	1:13.32	
5	2	Martha Ruether	United States	1:15.11	
6	1	Marian Polo Lopez	Spain	1:20.09	
7	7	Maja Reichard	Sweden	1:20.70	

=== Heat 3 ===
11:27 8 September 2016:

Rank	Lane	Name	Nationality	Time	Notes
1	4	Muslima Odilova	Uzbekistan	1:05.92	Q
2	5	Joanna Mendak	Poland	1:08.06	Q
3	3	María Delgado	Spain	1:08.44	Q
4	6	Prue Watt	Australia	1:09.80	
5	2	Naomi Maike Schnittger	Germany	1:09.96	
6	7	Karina Petrikovicova	Slovakia	1:20.83	
7	1	Naomi Ciorap	Romania	1:22.55	

== Final ==
19:39 8 September 2016:

Rank	Lane	Name	Nationality	Time	Notes
1st place, gold medalist(s)	5	Rebecca Meyers	United States	1:03.25	WR
2nd place, silver medalist(s)	3	Muslima Odilova	Uzbekistan	1:04.92	
3rd place, bronze medalist(s)	4	Fotimakhon Amilova	Uzbekistan	1:04.93	
4	6	Shokhsanamkhon Toshpulatova	Uzbekistan	1:05.81	
5	8	Anna Stetsenko	Ukraine	1:07.82	
6	2	Alessia Berra	Italy	1:08.24	
7	7	Joanna Mendak	Poland	1:08.37	
8	1	María Delgado	Spain	1:08.76	
