= Swimming at the 2016 Summer Paralympics – Women's 100 metre butterfly =

The women's 100 metre butterfly swimming events for the 2016 Summer Paralympics take place at the Rio Olympic Stadium from 8 to 15 September. A total of four events are contested for four different classifications.

== Competition format ==
Each event consists of two rounds: heats and final. The top eight swimmers overall in the heats progress to the final. If there are eight or fewer swimmers in an event, no heats are held and all swimmers qualify for the final.

== Results ==
=== S8 ===
20:22 9 September 2016:

| Rank | Lane | Name | Nationality | Time | Notes |
|---|---|---|---|---|---|
| 1st place, gold medalist(s) | 4 | Kateryna Istomina | Ukraine | 1:09.04 | PR |
| 2nd place, silver medalist(s) | 2 | Stephanie Slater | Great Britain | 1:10.32 | |
| 3rd place, bronze medalist(s) | 5 | Jessica Long | United States | 1:10.53 | |
| 4 | 3 | Weiyuan Lu | China | 1:11.68 | |
| 5 | 7 | Xiaoqin Jin | China | 1:13.52 | |
| 6 | 6 | Maddison Elliott | Australia | 1:13.80 | |
| 7 | 1 | Mallory Weggemann | United States | 1:17.41 | |
| 8 | 8 | Lakeisha Patterson | Australia | 1:18.99 | |

=== S9 ===
17:36 15 September 2016:

| Rank | Lane | Name | Nationality | Time | Notes |
|---|---|---|---|---|---|
| 1st place, gold medalist(s) | 4 | Jialing Xu | China | 1:07.90 | |
| 2nd place, silver medalist(s) | 6 | Sarai Gascon | Spain | 1:08.00 | |
| 3rd place, bronze medalist(s) | 2 | Zsofia Konkoly | Hungary | 1:09.21 | |
| 4 | 3 | Elizabeth Smith | United States | 1:09.22 | |
| 5 | 5 | Claire Cashmore | Great Britain | 1:09.46 | |
| 6 | 8 | Emily Beecroft | Australia | 1:10.56 | |
| 7 | 1 | Madeleine Scott | Australia | 1:10.85 | |
| 8 | 7 | Ellen Keane | Ireland | 1:11.27 | |

=== S10 ===
18:43 12 September 2016:

| Rank | Lane | Name | Nationality | Time | Notes |
|---|---|---|---|---|---|
| 1st place, gold medalist(s) | 4 | Sophie Pascoe | New Zealand | 1:02.65 | PR |
| 2nd place, silver medalist(s) | 5 | Yi Chen | China | 1:06.92 | |
| 3rd place, bronze medalist(s) | 2 | Oliwia Jablonska | Poland | 1:08.77 | |
| 4 | 3 | Isabel Yinghua Hernandez Santos | Spain | 1:09.23 | |
| 5 | 6 | Samantha Ryan | Canada | 1:09.73 | |
| 6 | 7 | Paige Leonhardt | Australia | 1:10.55 | |
| 7 | 8 | Alice Tai | Great Britain | 1:11.92 | |
| 8 | 1 | Chantalle Zijderveld | Netherlands | 1:13.56 | |

=== S13 ===
19:39 8 September 2016:

| Rank | Lane | Name | Nationality | Time | Notes |
|---|---|---|---|---|---|
| 1st place, gold medalist(s) | 5 | Rebecca Meyers | United States | 1:03.25 | WR |
| 2nd place, silver medalist(s) | 3 | Muslima Odilova | Uzbekistan | 1:04.92 | |
| 3rd place, bronze medalist(s) | 4 | Fotimakhon Amilova | Uzbekistan | 1:04.93 | |
| 4 | 6 | Shokhsanamkhon Toshpulatova | Uzbekistan | 1:05.81 | |
| 5 | 8 | Anna Stetsenko | Ukraine | 1:07.82 | |
| 6 | 2 | Alessia Berra | Italy | 1:08.24 | |
| 7 | 7 | Joanna Mendak | Poland | 1:08.37 | |
| 8 | 1 | María Delgado | Spain | 1:08.76 | |
