= Swimming at the 2016 Summer Paralympics – Men's 50 metre freestyle S13 =

Men's 50 metre freestyle S13 at the XV Paralympic Games
- Venue: Olympic Aquatics Stadium
- Dates: 14 September 2016
- Competitors: 21 from 12 nations

Medalists
1st place, gold medalist(s)		Ihar Boki	Belarus
2nd place, silver medalist(s)		Carlos Farrenberg	Brazil
3rd place, bronze medalist(s)		Muzaffar Tursunkhujaev	Uzbekistan

The Men's 50 metre freestyle S13 event at the 2016 Paralympic Games took place on 14 September 2016, at the Olympic Aquatics Stadium. No heats were held. The swimmers with the eight fastest times advanced to the final.

== Heats ==
=== Heat 1 ===
10:46 14 September 2016:

Rank	Lane	Name	Nationality	Time	Notes
1	5	Kirill Pankov	Uzbekistan	24.79	Q
2	4	Iaroslav Denysenko	Ukraine	24.89	Q
3	6	Guilherme Silva	Brazil	25.75	
4	3	Roman Agalakov	Kazakhstan	26.01	
5	2	Antti Latikka	Finland	26.22	
6	7	Gerasimos Lignos	Greece	27.09	

=== Heat 2 ===
10:49 14 September 2016:

Rank	Lane	Name	Nationality	Time	Notes
1	4	Carlos Farrenberg	Brazil	24.41	Q
2	5	Braedan Jason	Australia	24.75	Q
3	6	Nicolas Guy Turbide	Canada	25.54	Q
4	3	Jacob Templeton	Australia	25.75	
5	2	Sean Russo	Australia	26.19	
6	7	Marinus Melianus Yowei	Indonesia	26.57	

=== Heat 3 ===
10:51 14 September 2016:

Rank	Lane	Name	Nationality	Time	Notes
1	4	Ihar Boki	Belarus	23.73	PR Q
2	3	Muzaffar Tursunkhujaev	Uzbekistan	24.48	Q
3	5	Oleksii Fedyna	Ukraine	24.52	Q
4	6	Ivan Salguero Oteiza	Spain	25.72	
5	2	Firdavsbek Musabekov	Uzbekistan	25.99	
6	7	Kamil Rzetelski	Poland	26.09	
7	1	Devin Gotell	Canada	27.24	

=== Swim-off ===
11:22 14 September 2016:

Rank	Lane	Name	Nationality	Time	Notes
1	5	Jacob Templeton	Australia	25.42	
2	4	Guilherme Silva	Brazil	26.12	

== Final ==
19:46 14 September 2016:

Rank	Lane	Name	Nationality	Time	Notes
1st place, gold medalist(s)	4	Ihar Boki	Belarus	23.44	PR
2nd place, silver medalist(s)	5	Carlos Farrenberg	Brazil	24.17	
3rd place, bronze medalist(s)	3	Muzaffar Tursunkhujaev	Uzbekistan	24.21	
4	1	Iaroslav Denysenko	Ukraine	24.41	
5	6	Oleksii Fedyna	Ukraine	24.42	
6	2	Braedan Jason	Australia	24.61	
7	7	Kirill Pankov	Uzbekistan	24.63	
8	8	Nicolas Guy Turbide	Canada	25.52	
