= Swimming at the 2016 Summer Paralympics – Women's 50 metre freestyle S13 =

Women's 50 metre freestyle S13 at the XV Paralympic Games
- Venue: Olympic Aquatics Stadium
- Dates: 14 September 2016
- Competitors: 22 from 12 nations

Medalists
1st place, gold medalist(s)		Anna Stetsenko	Ukraine
2nd place, silver medalist(s)		Muslima Odilova	Uzbekistan
3rd place, bronze medalist(s)		Shokhsanamkhon Toshpulatova	Uzbekistan

The women's 50 metre freestyle S13 event at the 2016 Paralympic Games took place on 14 September 2016, at the Olympic Aquatics Stadium. Two heats were held. The swimmers with the eight fastest times advanced to the final.

== Heats ==
=== Heat 1 ===
11:25 14 September 2016:

Rank	Lane	Name	Nationality	Time	Notes
1	3	Muslima Odilova	Uzbekistan	28.37	Q
2	4	Joanna Mendak	Poland	28.64	Q
3	5	Rebecca Meyers	United States	28.86	
4	6	Katja Dedekind	Australia	28.97	
5	2	Marian Polo Lopez	Spain	29.41	
6	7	Abby Kane	Great Britain	29.98	

=== Heat 2 ===
11:25 14 September 2016:

Rank	Lane	Name	Nationality	Time	Notes
1	4	Shokhsanamkhon Toshpulatova	Uzbekistan	28.21	Q
2	2	Fotimakhon Amilova	Uzbekistan	28.67	Q
3	6	Alessia Berra	Italy	28.85	Q
4	3	Prue Watt	Australia	28.95	
5	5	Elena Krawzow	Germany	29.51	
6	7	Marta Maria Gomez Battelli	Spain	30.61	
7	1	Akari Kasamoto	Japan	31.86	

=== Heat 3 ===
11:25 14 September 2016:

Rank	Lane	Name	Nationality	Time	Notes
1	4	Anna Stetsenko	Ukraine	27.90	Q
2	6	Jenna Jones	Australia	28.57	Q
3	5	Colleen Young	United States	28.86	
4	3	Martha Ruether	United States	29.05	
5	2	Ariadna Edo Beltran	Spain	29.29	
6	7	Karina Petrikovicova	Slovakia	29.92	
7	1	Naomi Ciorap	Romania	30.93	

=== Swim off ===
11:25 14 September 2016:

Rank	Lane	Name	Nationality	Time	Notes
1	4	Rebecca Meyers	United States	28.60	Q
2	5	Colleen Young	United States	28.70	

== Final ==
19:52 14 September 2016:

Rank	Lane	Name	Nationality	Time	Notes
1st place, gold medalist(s)	4	Anna Stetsenko	Ukraine	27.34	WR
2nd place, silver medalist(s)	3	Muslima Odilova	Uzbekistan	28.00	
3rd place, bronze medalist(s)	5	Shokhsanamkhon Toshpulatova	Uzbekistan	28.02	
4	7	Fotimakhon Amilova	Uzbekistan	28.21	
5	2	Joanna Mendak	Poland	28.35	
6	8	Rebecca Meyers	United States	28.58	
7	6	Jenna Jones	Australia	28.77	
8	1	Alessia Berra	Italy	29.01	
