= Judo at the 2016 Summer Paralympics =

Judo Judo at the XV Paralympic Games
- Venue: Carioca Arena 3
- Location: Rio de Janeiro, Brazil
- Dates: 8–10 September 2016
- Competitors: 132 from 10 nations

Competition at external databases
- Links: IJF • JudoInside

The Para Judo competition of the 2016 Summer Paralympics was held in Hall 3 at the Carioca Arena inside the Olympic Training Center in Barra cluster between 8 and 10 September. There were 13 events, corresponding to seven weight classes for men and six for women, and a total of 132 athletes will compete. At the Paralympics, judo is contested by visually impaired athletes.

== Qualification ==
Qualification will be largely based on the world ranking list prepared by International Blind Sports Federation as of May 30, 2016. A total of 114 athletes will directly qualify through the ranking with only the top 9 men or top 6 women in each division, ensuring that each NPC is subjected to a limit of one judoka per division.

In addition, a quota place will be reserved in each weight category for the host nation, and a place will also be reserved for the NPC of the winners of each weight division at the 2014 IBSA World Championships. finally, the Bipartite Commission will also make one invite per weight division, to complete the field.

=== Qualification summary ===
NPC	Men							Women						Total
NPC	-60kg	-66kg	-73kg	-81kg	-90kg	-100kg	+100kg	-48kg	-52kg	-57kg	-63kg	-70kg	+70kg	Total
Algeria	X		X						X					3
Argentina	X		X	X	X			X						5
Azerbaijan	X	X	X	X	X	X	X			X	X			9
Belarus				X									X	2
Brazil	X	X	X	X	X	X	X	X	X	X		X	X	12
Canada					X				X					2
China								X		X	X	X	X	5
Chinese Taipei	X							X						2
Croatia												X		1
Cuba			X		X	X	X				X			5
France				X					X					2
Georgia					X									1
Germany			X	X		X		X	X					5
Great Britain	X			X	X	X	X					X		5
Greece						X								1
Hungary										X		X		2
Iran				X		X	X							3
Iraq							X							1
Japan	X	X	X		X		X	X	X	X	X			9
Kazakhstan	X		X											2
Lithuania		X												1
Mexico				X								X		2
Mongolia	X	X												2
Portugal		X												1
Puerto Rico		X												1
Romania	X													1
South Korea	X	X		X		X				X	X			6
Spain		X	X		X					X				4
Sweden											X			1
Thailand													X	1
Turkey						X	X	X					X	4
Ukraine		X	X	X	X	X		X	X	X	X			9
United States					X	X	X						X	4
Uruguay	X												X	1
Uzbekistan	X	X	X	X	X	X	X		X		X	X	X	11
Venezuela		X	X				X					X		4

== Medal summary ==
=== Medal table ===
Rank	Nation	Gold	Silver	Bronze	Total
1	Uzbekistan (UZB)	3	1	6	10
2	China (CHN)	2	0	0	2
2	Mexico (MEX)	2	0	0	2
4	Ukraine (UKR)	1	3	3	7
5	South Korea (KOR)	1	1	2	4
6	Azerbaijan (AZE)	1	1	1	3
7	Cuba (CUB)	1	0	2	3
8	France (FRA)	1	0	0	1
8	Georgia (GEO)	1	0	0	1
10	Brazil (BRA)	0	4	0	4
11	Germany (GER)	0	2	1	3
12	Japan (JPN)	0	1	3	4
13	Turkey (TUR)	0	0	2	2
13	United States (USA)	0	0	2	2
15	Algeria (ALG)	0	0	1	1
15	Mongolia (MGL)	0	0	1	1
15	Romania (ROU)	0	0	1	1
15	Venezuela (VEN)	0	0	1	1
Totals (18 entries)		13	13	26	52

=== Men's events ===
Event	Gold	Silver	Bronze
60 kg	Sherzod Namozov; Uzbekistan	Makoto Hirose; Japan	Alex Bologa; Romania
60 kg	Sherzod Namozov; Uzbekistan	Makoto Hirose; Japan	Bolormaa Uugankhuu; Mongolia
66 kg	Utkirjon Nigmatov; Uzbekistan	Bayram Mustafayev; Azerbaijan	Davyd Khorava; Ukraine
66 kg	Utkirjon Nigmatov; Uzbekistan	Bayram Mustafayev; Azerbaijan	Satoshi Fujimoto; Japan
73 kg	Ramil Gasimov; Azerbaijan	Dmytro Solovey; Ukraine	Feruz Sayidov; Uzbekistan
73 kg	Ramil Gasimov; Azerbaijan	Dmytro Solovey; Ukraine	Nikolai Kornhass; Germany
81 kg	Eduardo Avila Sanchez; Mexico	Lee Jung-min; South Korea	Rovshan Safarov; Azerbaijan
81 kg	Eduardo Avila Sanchez; Mexico	Lee Jung-min; South Korea	Oleksandr Kosinov; Ukraine
90 kg	Zviad Gogotchuri; Georgia	Oleksandr Nazarenko; Ukraine	Dartanyon Crockett; United States
90 kg	Zviad Gogotchuri; Georgia	Oleksandr Nazarenko; Ukraine	Shukhrat Boboev; Uzbekistan
100 kg	Choi Gwang-geun; South Korea	Antônio Tenório; Brazil	Yordani Fernandez Sastre; Cuba
100 kg	Choi Gwang-geun; South Korea	Antônio Tenório; Brazil	Shirin Sharipov; Uzbekistan
+100 kg	Adiljan Tulendibaev; Uzbekistan	Wilians Silva de Araújo; Brazil	Kento Masaki; Japan
+100 kg	Adiljan Tulendibaev; Uzbekistan	Wilians Silva de Araújo; Brazil	Yangaliny Jimenez; Cuba

=== Women's events ===
Compelete with:

- Results - Judo
- Results - Womens 52kg
- Results - Womens 57kg
- Results - Womens 63kg
- Results - Women's 70kg

Event	Gold	Silver	Bronze
48 kg	Li Liqing; China	Carmen Brussig; Germany	Ecem Taşın; Turkey
48 kg	Li Liqing; China	Carmen Brussig; Germany	Yuliya Halinska; Ukraine
52 kg	Sandrine Martinet; France	Ramona Brussig; Germany	Cherine Abdellaoui; Algeria
52 kg	Sandrine Martinet; France	Ramona Brussig; Germany	Sevinch Salaeva; Uzbekistan
57 kg	Inna Cherniak; Ukraine	Lúcia da Silva Teixeira Araújo; Brazil	Junko Hirose; Japan
57 kg	Inna Cherniak; Ukraine	Lúcia da Silva Teixeira Araújo; Brazil	Seo Ha-na; South Korea
63 kg	Dalidaivis Rodriguez Clark; Cuba	Iryna Husieva; Ukraine	Jin Song-lee; South Korea
63 kg	Dalidaivis Rodriguez Clark; Cuba	Iryna Husieva; Ukraine	Tursunpashsha Nurmetova; Uzbekistan
70 kg	Lenia Fabiola Ruvalcaba Alvarez; Mexico	Alana Martins Maldonado; Brazil	Naomi Soazo; Venezuela
70 kg	Lenia Fabiola Ruvalcaba Alvarez; Mexico	Alana Martins Maldonado; Brazil	Gulruh Rahimova; Uzbekistan
+70 kg	Yuan Yanping; China	Khayitjon Alimova; Uzbekistan	Christella Garcia; United States
+70 kg	Yuan Yanping; China	Khayitjon Alimova; Uzbekistan	Mesme Tasbag; Turkey
