= Swimming at the 2020 Summer Paralympics – Women's 200 metre individual medley SM13 =

Women's 200 metre individual medley SM13 at the XVI Paralympic Games
- Venue: Tokyo Aquatics Centre
- Dates: 30 August 2021
- Competitors: 12 from 9 nations

Medalists
1st place, gold medalist(s)		Carlotta Gilli	Italy
2nd place, silver medalist(s)		Colleen Young	United States
3rd place, bronze medalist(s)		Shokhsanamkhon Toshpulatova	Uzbekistan

The Women's 200 metre individual medley SM13 event at the 2020 Paralympic Games took place on 30 August 2021, at the Tokyo Aquatics Centre.

== Heats ==
The swimmers with the top eight times, regardless of heat, advanced to the final.

Rank	Heat	Lane	Name	Nationality	Time	Notes
1	2	4	Carlotta Gilli	Italy	2:26.52	Q
2	2	5	Colleen Young	United States	2:29.61	Q
3	1	4	Shokhsanamkhon Toshpulatova	Uzbekistan	2:30.42	Q
4	1	3	Anna Stetsenko	Ukraine	2:33.75	Q
5	2	6	Róisín Ní Riain	Ireland	2:34.24	Q
6	2	3	Daria Lukianenko	RPC	2:34.27	Q
7	2	2	Marlene Endrolath	Germany	2:38.22	Q
8	1	7	Anastasiya Zudzilava	Belarus	2:40.18	Q
9	1	6	Nigorakhon Mirzokhidova	Uzbekistan	2:40.44	
10	1	2	Ariadna Edo Beltrán	Spain	2:40.78	
11	2	7	Mariia Latritskaia	RPC	2:46.08	
12	1	5	Daria Pikalova	RPC	2:57.37	

== Final ==
Rank	Lane	Name	Nationality	Time	Notes
1st place, gold medalist(s)	4	Carlotta Gilli	Italy	2:21.44	WR
2nd place, silver medalist(s)	5	Colleen Young	United States	2:26.80	
3rd place, bronze medalist(s)	3	Shokhsanamkhon Toshpulatova	Uzbekistan	2:27.92	
4	7	Daria Lukianenko	RPC	2:30.22	
5	6	Anna Stetsenko	Ukraine	2:30.69	
6	2	Róisín Ní Riain	Ireland	2:34.12	
7	1	Marlene Endrolath	Germany	2:36.55	
8	8	Anastasiya Zudzilava	Belarus	2:42.13	
