= Seo Ha-na =

South Korean Paralympic judoka

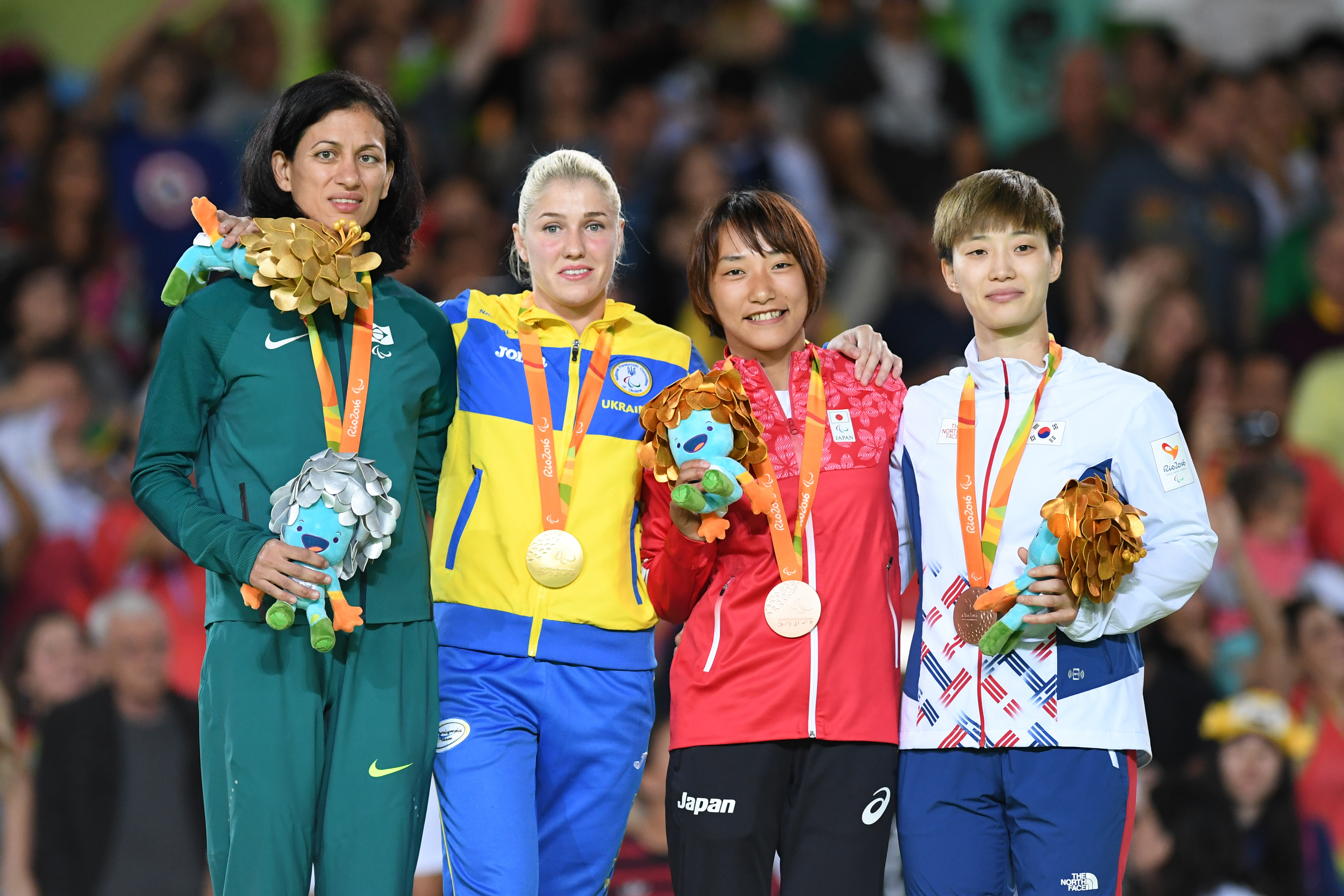
- Seo Ha-na at the 2016 Summer Paralympics (far right)

Personal information
- Born: 7 June 1987 (age 39)

Sport
- Country: South Korea
- Sport: Paralympic judo
Medal record
Paralympic Games
| Bronze medal – third place | 2016 Rio de Janeiro | 57 kg |

Seo Ha-na (Korean: 서하나; born 7 June 1987) is a South Korean Paralympic judoka. She represented South Korea at the 2016 Summer Paralympics held in Rio de Janeiro, Brazil and she won one of the bronze medals in the women's 57 kg event.
