= Gulruh Rahimova =

Uzbekistani Paralympic judoka (born 1992)

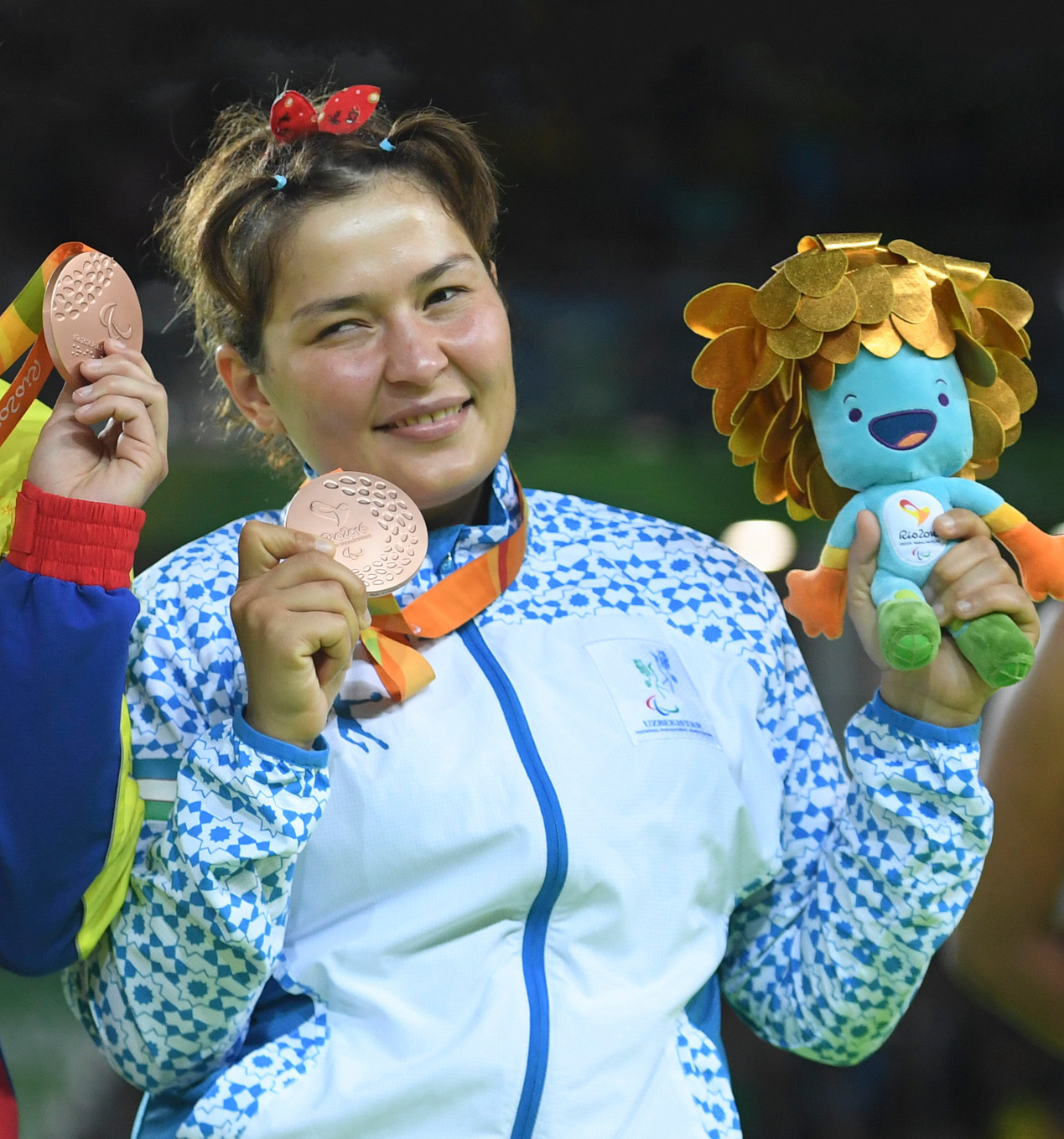
- Gulruh Rahimova (2016)

Personal information
- Born: 29 September 1992 (age 33)
- Occupation: Judoka

Sport
- Country: Uzbekistan
- Sport: Para judo
- Weight class: 70 kg
Medal record
Paralympic Games
Bronze medal – third place	2016 Rio de Janeiro	70 kg
Asian Para Games
Silver medal – second place	2014 Incheon	70 kg
Islamic Solidarity Games
Bronze medal – third place	2017 Baku	70 kg

Profile at external databases
- JudoInside.com: 99647

Gulruh Rahimova (born 29 September 1992) is an Uzbekistani para judoka. She represented Uzbekistan at the 2016 Summer Paralympics held in Rio de Janeiro, Brazil and won one of the bronze medals in the women's 70 kg event.

In 2017, she won the bronze medal in the women's middleweight event at the Islamic Solidarity Games held in Baku, Azerbaijan.

At the World Games for the Blind and Visually Impaired in Seoul, Republic of Korea in May 2015, she finished seventh in women's the 70 kg event.
