= Swimming at the 2016 Summer Paralympics – Men's 100 metre breaststroke SB13 =

Men's 100 metre breaststroke SB13 at the XV Paralympic Games
- Venue: Olympic Aquatics Stadium
- Dates: 11 September 2016
- Competitors: 11 from 10 nations

Medalists
| 1st place, gold medalist(s) | | Oleksii Fedyna | Ukraine |
| 1st place, gold medalist(s) | | Firdavsbek Musabekov | Uzbekistan |
| 3rd place, bronze medalist(s) | | Ihar Boki | Belarus |

The Men's 100 metre breaststroke SB13 event at the 2016 Paralympic Games took place on 11 September 2016, at the Olympic Aquatics Stadium. Two heats were held. The swimmers with the eight fastest times advanced to the final.

== Heats ==
=== Heat 1 ===
10:14 11 September 2016:

| Rank | Lane | Name | Nationality | Time | Notes |
|---|---|---|---|---|---|
| 1 | 4 | Firdavsbek Musabekov | Uzbekistan | 1:05.38 | Q |
| 2 | 5 | Liam Bekric | Australia | 1:09.17 | Q |
| 3 | 6 | Sean Russo | Australia | 1:14.32 | Q |
| 4 | 3 | Kamil Rzetelski | Poland | 1:14.62 | |
| 5 | 2 | Tyler Mrak | Canada | 1:15.69 | |

=== Heat 2 ===
10:18 11 September 2016:

| Rank | Lane | Name | Nationality | Time | Notes |
|---|---|---|---|---|---|
| 1 | 4 | Oleksii Fedyna | Ukraine | 1:04.98 | Q |
| 2 | 5 | Ihar Boki | Belarus | 1:06.79 | Q |
| 3 | 3 | Guilherme Silva | Brazil | 1:12.85 | Q |
| 4 | 6 | Ivan Salguero Oteiza | Spain | 1:13.08 | Q |
| 5 | 7 | Gerasimos Lignos | Greece | 1:14.25 | Q |
| 6 | 2 | Marinus Melianus Yowei | Indonesia | 1:14.39 | |

== Final ==
18:02 11 September 2016:

| Rank | Lane | Name | Nationality | Time | Notes |
|---|---|---|---|---|---|
| 1st place, gold medalist(s) | 4 | Oleksii Fedyna | Ukraine | 1:04.94 | |
| 1st place, gold medalist(s) | 5 | Firdavsbek Musabekov | Uzbekistan | 1:04.94 | |
| 3rd place, bronze medalist(s) | 3 | Ihar Boki | Belarus | 1:06.71 | |
| 4 | 6 | Liam Bekric | Australia | 1:08.70 | |
| 5 | 2 | Guilherme Silva | Brazil | 1:13.58 | |
| 6 | 1 | Gerasimos Lignos | Greece | 1:13.68 | |
| 7 | 8 | Sean Russo | Australia | 1:13.85 | |
| 8 | 7 | Ivan Salguero Oteiza | Spain | 1:13.95 | |
