= Swimming at the 2016 Summer Paralympics – Women's 100 metre butterfly S8 =

Women's 100 metre butterfly S8 at the XV Paralympic Games
- Venue: Olympic Aquatics Stadium
- Dates: 9 September 2016
- Competitors: 13 from 8 nations

Medalists
1st place, gold medalist(s)		Kateryna Istomina	Ukraine
2nd place, silver medalist(s)		Stephanie Slater	Great Britain
3rd place, bronze medalist(s)		Jessica Long	United States

The women's 100 metre butterfly S8 event at the 2016 Paralympic Games took place on 9 September 2016, at the Olympic Aquatics Stadium. Two heats were held. The swimmers with the eight fastest times advanced to the final.

== Heats ==
=== Heat 1 ===
11:26 9 September 2016:

Rank	Lane	Name	Nationality	Time	Notes
1	4	Jessica Long	United States	1:11.56	Q
2	5	Weiyuan Lu	China	1:12.29	Q
3	3	Maddison Elliott	Australia	1:16.18	Q
4	6	Mallory Weggemann	United States	1:18.44	Q
5	2	Cleo Keijzer	Netherlands	1:21.29	
6	7	Brickelle Bro	United States	1:30.14	

=== Heat 2 ===
11:30 9 September 2016:

Rank	Lane	Name	Nationality	Time	Notes
1	5	Kateryna Istomina	Ukraine	1:10.36	Q
2	4	Stephanie Slater	Great Britain	1:16.32	Q
3	6	Xiaoqin Jin	China	1:16.94	Q
4	7	Lakeisha Patterson	Australia	1:19.96	Q
5	2	Danielle Dorris	Canada	1:21.99	
6	1	Amalie Vinther	Denmark	1:27.78	
7	3	Shengnan Jiang	China	1:28.19	

== Final ==
20:22 9 September 2016:

Rank	Lane	Name	Nationality	Time	Notes
1st place, gold medalist(s)	4	Kateryna Istomina	Ukraine	1:09.04	PR
2nd place, silver medalist(s)	2	Stephanie Slater	Great Britain	1:10.32	
3rd place, bronze medalist(s)	5	Jessica Long	United States	1:10.53	
4	3	Weiyuan Lu	China	1:11.68	
5	7	Xiaoqin Jin	China	1:13.52	
6	6	Maddison Elliott	Australia	1:13.80	
7	1	Mallory Weggemann	United States	1:17.41	
8	8	Lakeisha Patterson	Australia	1:18.99	
