= Tursunpashsha Nurmetova =

Uzbekistani Paralympic judoka (born 1996)

Personal information
- Born: 17 January 1996 (age 30)

Sport
- Country: Uzbekistan
- Sport: Paralympic judo
Medal record
Paralympic Games
Bronze medal – third place	2016 Rio de Janeiro	63 kg

Tursunpashsha Nurmetova (born 17 January 1996) is an Uzbekistani Paralympic judoka. She represented Uzbekistan at the 2016 Summer Paralympics held in Rio de Janeiro, Brazil and she won the bronze medal in the women's 63 kg event.
