= Swimming at the 2016 Summer Paralympics – Men's 100 metre butterfly S13 =

Event at the 2016 Summer Paralympics

Men's 100 metre butterfly S13 at the XV Paralympic Games
- Venue: Olympic Aquatics Stadium
- Dates: 8 September 2016
- Competitors: 20 from 13 nations
- Winning time: 53.85

Medalists
1st place, gold medalist(s)		Ihar Boki	Belarus
2nd place, silver medalist(s)		Kirill Pankov	Uzbekistan
3rd place, bronze medalist(s)		Muzaffar Tursunkhujaev	Uzbekistan

The Men's 100 metre butterfly S13 event at the 2016 Paralympic Games took place on 8 September 2016, at the Olympic Aquatics Stadium. Three heats were held. The swimmers with the eight fastest times advanced to the final.

== Heats ==
=== Heat 1 ===
11:10 8 September 2016:

Rank	Lane	Name	Nationality	Time	Notes
1	4	Kirill Pankov	Uzbekistan	58.24	Q
2	5	Braedan Jason	Australia	59.77	Q
3	6	Jacob Templeton	Australia	1:01.04	
4	3	Roman Agalakov	Kazakhstan	1:02.37	
5	2	Antti Latikka	Finland	1:03.72	
6	7	Diego Fernando Cuesta Martinez	Colombia	1:06.18	

=== Heat 2 ===
11:13 8 September 2016:

Rank	Lane	Name	Nationality	Time	Notes
1	5	Muzaffar Tursunkhujaev	Uzbekistan	58.21	Q
2	4	Dzmitry Salei	Azerbaijan	58.83	Q
3	6	Tucker Dupree	United States	1:00.13	Q
4	3	Illia Yaremenko	Ukraine	1:00.35	
5	2	Daniel Giraldo Correa	Colombia	1:02.50	
6	7	Anuar Akhmetov	Kazakhstan	1:06.43	
7	1	Tyler Mrak	Canada	1:09.28	

=== Heat 3 ===
11:16 8 September 2016:

Rank	Lane	Name	Nationality	Time	Notes
1	4	Ihar Boki	Belarus	54.54	PR Q
2	3	Thomaz Matera	Brazil	58.40	Q
2	5	Raman Salei	Azerbaijan	58.40	Q
4	6	Danylo Chufarov	Ukraine	1:00.74	
5	2	Sean Russo	Australia	1:02.18	
6	7	Kamil Rzetelski	Poland	1:02.73	
7	1	Dong Ho Han	South Korea	1:03.25	

== Final ==
19:32 8 September 2016:

Rank	Lane	Name	Nationality	Time	Notes
1st place, gold medalist(s)	4	Ihar Boki	Belarus	53.85	WR
2nd place, silver medalist(s)	3	Kirill Pankov	Uzbekistan	56.84	
3rd place, bronze medalist(s)	5	Muzaffar Tursunkhujaev	Uzbekistan	57.26	
4	2	Raman Salei	Azerbaijan	58.11	
5	7	Dzmitry Salei	Azerbaijan	58.16	
6	6	Thomaz Matera	Brazil	58.42	
7	1	Braedan Jason	Australia	1:00.12	
8	8	Tucker Dupree	United States	1:00.76	

== See also ==
- Swimming at the 2020 Summer Paralympics – Men's 100 metre butterfly S13
