= Uzbekistan at the 2016 Summer Paralympics =

- IPC code: UZB
- NPC: Uzbekistan National Paralympic Association

in Rio de Janeiro
- Competitors: 32 in 5 sports
- Flag bearer: Doniyor Saliev
- Officials: Uzbekistan at the Paralympics
- Medals Ranked 16th: Gold 8 Silver 6 Bronze 17 Total 31

Summer Paralympics appearances (overview)
- 2004; 2008; 2012; 2016; 2020; 2024

Other related appearances
- Soviet Union (1988); Unified Team (1992)

Uzbekistan competed at the 2016 Summer Paralympics in Rio de Janeiro, Brazil, from 7 to 18 September 2016.

== Disability classifications ==
Every participant at the Paralympics has their disability grouped into one of five disability categories; amputation, the condition may be congenital or sustained through injury or illness; cerebral palsy; wheelchair athletes, there is often overlap between this and other categories; visual impairment, including blindness; Les autres, any physical disability that does not fall strictly under one of the other categories, for example dwarfism or multiple sclerosis. Each Paralympic sport then has its own classifications, dependent upon the specific physical demands of competition. Events are given a code, made of numbers and letters, describing the type of event and classification of the athletes competing. Some sports, such as athletics, divide athletes by both the category and severity of their disabilities, other sports, for example swimming, group competitors from different categories together, the only separation being based on the severity of the disability.

== Medalists ==
Medal	Name	Sport	Event	Date
Gold	Khusniddin Norbekov	Athletics	Discus throw F37	September 9
Gold	Sherzod Namozov	Judo	Men-60kg	September 9
Gold	Utkirjon Nigmatov	Judo	Men-66kg	September 9
Gold	Adiljan Tulendibaev	Judo	Men +100kg	September 11
Gold	Fotimakhon Amilova	Swimming	100 m Breaststroke SB13	September 12
Gold	Firdavsbek Musabekov	Swimming	100 m Breaststroke SB13	September 12
Gold	Aleksandr Svechnikov	Athletics	Men's javelin throw F13	September 14
Gold	Nozimakhon Kayumova	Athletics	Javelin throw F13	September 17
Silver	Kirill Pankov	Swimming	100 m butterfly S13	September 9
Silver	Muslima Odilova	Swimming	100 m butterfly S13	September 9
Silver	Khayitjon Alimova	Judo	Women's +70kg	September 10
Silver	Fotimakhon Amilova	Swimming	200 m individual medley S13	September 10
Silver	Safiya Burkhanova	Athletics	Shot put F11/12	September 14
Silver	Muslima Odilova	Swimming	50 m freestyle S13	September 14
Bronze	Fotimakhon Amilova	Swimming	100 m butterfly S13	September 9
Bronze	Sevinch Salaeva	Judo	Women's –52kg	September 9
Bronze	Muzaffar Tursunkhujaev	Swimming	100 m butterfly S13	September 9
Bronze	Server Ibragimov	Shooting	Men's 10m air pistol SH1	September 9
Bronze	Tursunpashsha Nurmetova	Judo	Women's –63kg	September 10
Bronze	Feruz Sayidov	Judo	Men-73kg	September 10
Bronze	Shukhrat Boboev	Judo	Men-90kg	September 10
Bronze	Shirin Sharipov	Judo	Men-100kg	September 10
Bronze	Gulruh Rahimova	Judo	Women's –70kg	September 10
Bronze	Doniyor Saliev	Athletics	Long jump T12	September 10
Bronze	Shokhsanamkhon Toshpulatova	Swimming	200 m individual medley S13	September 10
Bronze	Dmitriy Horlin	Swimming	400 m Freestyle S13	September 13
Bronze	Akhror Bozorov	Powerlifting	Men's –80 kg	September 13
Bronze	Miran Sakhatov; Mansur Abdirashidov; Doniyor Saliev; Fakhriddin Khamraev	Athletics	4 × 100 m relay T11-T13	September 10
Bronze	Khusniddin Norbekov	Athletics	Shot put F37	September 14
Bronze	Muzaffar Tursunkhujaev	Swimming	50 m freestyle S13	September 14
Bronze	Shokhsanamkhon Toshpulatova	Swimming	50 m freestyle S13	September 14

Medals by sport
Sport	1st place, gold medalist(s)	2nd place, silver medalist(s)	3rd place, bronze medalist(s)	Total
Judo	3	1	6	10
Athletics	3	1	3	7
Swimming	2	4	6	12
Shooting	0	0	1	1
Powerlifting	0	0	1	1
Total	8	6	17	31

Medals by day
Day	1st place, gold medalist(s)	2nd place, silver medalist(s)	3rd place, bronze medalist(s)	Total
September 9	3	2	4	9
September 10	0	2	7	9
September 11	1	0	0	1
September 12	2	0	0	2
September 13	0	0	3	3
September 14	1	2	3	6
September 17	1	0	0	1
Total	8	6	17	31

Medals by gender
Gender	1st place, gold medalist(s)	2nd place, silver medalist(s)	3rd place, bronze medalist(s)	Total
Male	6	1	11	18
Female	2	5	6	13
Total	8	6	17	31

== Competitors ==
The following is the list of number of competitors participating in the Games:

Sport	Men	Women	Total
Athletics	8	3	11
Judo	7	4	11
Powerlifting	2	0	2
Shooting	1	0	1
Swimming	4	3	7
Total	22	10	32

== Athletics (track and field) ==
=== Men ===
Track events

Athlete	Events	Heat		Semi-final		Final	
Athlete	Events	Time	Rank	Time	Rank	Time	Rank
Mansur Abdirashidov	100 m T12	DSQ		did not advance			
Mansur Abdirashidov	200 m T12	22.66	3 Q	22.69	4 Q	22.69	4
Miran Sakhatov	100 m T11	11.87		did not advance			
Fakhriddin Khamraev	400 m T12	DSQ		did not advance			
Fakhriddin Khamraev	200 m T12	22.88	6 Q	23.23	8	did not advance	
Miran Sakhatov Mansur Abdirashidov Doniyor Saliev Fakhriddin Khamraev	4 × 100 m relay T11-T13	—N/a				43.47	3rd place, bronze medalist(s)

Field events

Athlete	Event	Points	Mark	Rank
Khusniddin Norbekov	Discus throw F37	—N/a	59.75	1st place, gold medalist(s)
Khusniddin Norbekov	Shot put F37	—N/a	15.17	3rd place, bronze medalist(s)
Farukh Mirzakulov	Long jump T45-46-47	—N/a	6.78	8
Doniyor Saliev	Long jump T12	—N/a	7.04	3rd place, bronze medalist(s)
Mavlonbek Haydarov	Shot put F11-12	—N/a	15.61	4
Aleksandr Svechnikov	Javelin throw F12-13	—N/a	65.69	1st place, gold medalist(s)

=== Women ===
Field events

Athlete	Event	Points	Mark	Rank
Nozimakhon Kayumova	Javelin throw F12-13	—N/a	44.58	1st place, gold medalist(s)
Safiya Burkhanova	Shot Put F11-12	—N/a	15.05	2nd place, silver medalist(s)
Dilafruzkhon Akhmatkhonova	Shot Put F35	—N/a	7.87	6

== Judo ==
With one pathway for qualification being having a top finish at the 2014 IBSA Judo World Championships, Uzbekistan earned a qualifying spot in Rio base on the performance of Adiljan Tulendibaev in the men's +100 kg event. The B2 Judoka finished first in his class.

=== Men ===
Athlete	Event	Round of 16	Quarterfinals	Semifinals	Repechage First round	Repechage Final	Final / BM	
Athlete	Event	Opposition Result	Opposition Result	Opposition Result	Opposition Result	Opposition Result	Opposition Result	Rank
Sherzod Namozov	Men's –60kg	Bye	Borges (URU); W 111–001	Ibrahimov (AZE); W 100–000	Bye	Bye	Makoto (JPN); W 100–000	1st place, gold medalist(s)
Utkirjon Nigmatov	Men's –66kg	Bye	Pérez Díaz (PUR); W 010–000	Khorava (UKR); W 100–000	Bye	Bye	Mustafayev (AZE); W 110–000	1st place, gold medalist(s)
Feruz Sayidov	Men's –73kg	Bye	Meskine (ALG); W 111–000	Solovey (UKR); L 000–000	Bye	Bye	Rodriguez (CUB); W 102–010	3rd place, bronze medalist(s)
Sharif Khalilov	Men's –81kg	Drane (GBR); L 000 ^{3}–000	did not advance		Jonard (FRA); W 100–000	Nouri Jafari (IRI); L 002–011	did not advance	7
Shukhrat Boboev	Men's –90kg	Bye	CROCKETT (USA); L 010–011	Did not advance	Bye	LENCINA (ARG); W 010–000	HIERREZUELO (CUB)W 101–000	3rd place, bronze medalist(s)
Shirin Sharipov	Men's –100kg	Bye	Bolukbasi (TUR); W 100–000	Tenorio (BRA); L 000–001	Bye	Did not advance	Abdullakhanli (AZE); W 001–000	3rd place, bronze medalist(s)
Adiljan Tulendibaev	Men's +100kg	Goodrich (USA); W 101–000	Zakiev (AZE); W 100–000	Masaki (JPN); W 100–000	Bye	Bye	Silva de Araujo (BRA); W 100–000	1st place, gold medalist(s)

=== Women ===
Athlete	Event	Quarterfinals	Semifinals	Repechage First round	Repechage Final	Final / BM	
Athlete	Event	Opposition Result	Opposition Result	Opposition Result	Opposition Result	Opposition Result	Rank
Sevinch Salaeva	Women's –52kg	Ishii (JPN); W 100–000	Brussig (GER); L 000–001	Did not advance	Bye	Gagne (CAN); W 001–000	3rd place, bronze medalist(s)
Tursunpashsha Nurmetova	Women's –63kg	Zhou (CHN); W 110–000	Husieva (UKR); W 000–000^{2}	Did not advance	Bye	Pernheim (SWE); W 100–000	3rd place, bronze medalist(s)
Gulruh Rahimova	Women's –70kg	Ruvalcaba Alvarez (MEX); L 000–100	Did not advance	Bye	Zhou (CHN); W 100–000	Szabo (HUN)W 000–000 ^{2}	3rd place, bronze medalist(s)
Khayitjon Alimova	Women's +70kg	Nantharak (THA); W 100–000	Kachan (BLR); W 100–000	Bye	Bye	Yuan (CHN); L 000–101	2nd place, silver medalist(s)

== Powerlifting ==
Athlete	Event	Total lifted	Rank
Akhror Bozorov	Men's –80 kg	207.0	3rd place, bronze medalist(s)
Nuriddin Davlatov	Men's –107 kg	200.0	7

== Shooting ==
The country sent shooters to 2015 IPC IPC Shooting World Cup in Osijek, Croatia, where Rio direct qualification was available. They earned a qualifying spot at this event based on the performance of Server Ibragimov in the P4 – 50m Pistol Mixed SH1 event.

Athlete	Event	Qualification		Final	
Athlete	Event	Score	Rank	Score	Rank
Server Ibragimov	Men's 10m air pistol SH1	566	2	172.1	3rd place, bronze medalist(s)
Server Ibragimov	Mixed 50m pistol SH1	522	14	did not advance	

== Swimming ==
7 Swimmers in 26 events:

Athlete	Events	Heats		Final	
Athlete	Events	Time	Rank	Time	Rank
Men's
Dmitriy Horlin	50 m Freestyle S12	25.59	5	did not advance	
Dmitriy Horlin	100 m Freestyle S13	55.12	3	did not advance	
Dmitriy Horlin	400 m Freestyle S13	4:13.69	2 Q	4:06.63	(bronze)
Dmitriy Horlin	200 m IM-F13	2:16.84	3 Q	2:15.18	5
Firdavsbek Musabekov	200 m IM-F13	2:19.98	4	did not advance	9
Firdavsbek Musabekov	50 m Freestyle S13	25.99	5	did not advance	
Firdavsbek Musabekov	100 m Breaststroke SB13	1:05.38	1 Q	1:04.94	(gold)
Kirill Pankov	100 m butterfly S13	58.24	1 Q	56.84	(silver)
Kirill Pankov	50 m Freestyle S13	24.79	1 Q	24.63	7
Kirill Pankov	100 m Breaststroke S13	1:01.21	3 Q	1:00.44	4
Muzaffar Tursunkhujaev	100 m butterfly S13	58.21	1 Q	57.26	(bronze)
Muzaffar Tursunkhujaev	50 m Freestyle S13	24.48	2 Q	24.21	(bronze)
Muzaffar Tursunkhujaev	100 m Freestyle S13	53.85	4 Q	53.90	6
Muzaffar Tursunkhujaev	100 m Breaststroke S13	1:04.58	7 Q	1:03.80	7
Women's
Muslima Odilova	50 m Freestyle S13	—N/a		28.00	(silver)
Muslima Odilova	100 m Freestyle S13	1:02.45	4 Q	DSQ	
Muslima Odilova	100 m butterfly S13	1:05.92	1 Q	1:04.92	(silver)
Fotimakhon Amilova	100 m butterfly S13	1:04.72	1 Q	1:04.93	(bronze)
Fotimakhon Amilova	50 m Freestyle S13	—N/a		28.21	4
Fotimakhon Amilova	100 m Freestyle S13	1:01.78	3 Q	1:01.26	5
Fotimakhon Amilova	200 m IM S13	2:30.16	1 Q	2:25.23	(silver)
Fotimakhon Amilova	100 m Breaststroke SB13	1:21.20	3 Q	1:12.45	(gold)
Shokhsanamkhon Toshpulatova	100 m butterfly S13	1:06.77	1 Q	1:05.81	4
Shokhsanamkhon Toshpulatova	100 m IM S13	2:24.43	Q	2:27.31	(bronze)
Shokhsanamkhon Toshpulatova	50 m Freestyle S13	—N/a		28.02	(bronze)
Shokhsanamkhon Toshpulatova	100 m Freestyle S13	1:01.07	2 Q	1:00.41	4

== See also ==
- Uzbekistan at the 2016 Summer Olympics
- Uzbekistan at the Paralympics
