= Firdavsbek Musabekov =

Uzbekistani Paralympic swimmer

Sport
- Country: Uzbekistan
- Sport: Paralympic swimming
- Disability: Vision impairment
- Disability class: S13
Medal record
Paralympic swimming
Representing Uzbekistan
Paralympic Games
Gold medal – first place	2016 Rio de Janeiro	100 m breaststroke SB13
World Championships
Silver medal – second place	2019 London	100 m breaststroke SB13
Asian Para Games
Gold medal – first place	2018 Jakarta	100 m breaststroke SB13
Gold medal – first place	2018 Jakarta	200 m ind. medley SM13
Silver medal – second place	2022 Hangzhou	100 m breaststroke SB13
Bronze medal – third place	2022 Hangzhou	400 m freestyle S13

Firdavsbek Musabekov is a visually impaired Uzbekistani Paralympic swimmer. He is a gold medalist at the 2016 Summer Paralympics held in Rio de Janeiro, Brazil.

== Career ==
He represented Uzbekistan at the 2016 Summer Paralympics held in Rio de Janeiro, Brazil and he won one of the gold medals in the men's 100 metre breaststroke SB13 event. Oleksii Fedyna, representing Ukraine, also won a gold medal as both swimmers finished with a time of 1:04.94.

At the 2019 World Para Swimming Championships held in London, United Kingdom, he won the silver medal in the men's 100m breaststroke SB13 event.

He also represented Uzbekistan at the 2020 Summer Paralympics in Tokyo, Japan.
