= Khayitjon Alimova =

Uzbekistani Paralympic judoka (born 1992)

Personal information
- Born: 9 January 1992 (age 34)

Sport
- Country: Uzbekistan
- Sport: Paralympic judo
Medal record
Paralympic Games
Silver medal – second place	2016 Rio de Janeiro	+70 kg
Asian Para Games
Silver medal – second place	2014 Incheon	+78 kg

Khayitjon Alimova (born 9 January 1992) is an Uzbekistani Paralympic judoka. She represented Uzbekistan at the 2016 Summer Paralympics held in Rio de Janeiro, Brazil and she won the silver medal in the women's +70 kg event.
