= New Zealand at the 2016 Summer Paralympics =

- IPC code: NZL
- NPC: Paralympics New Zealand
- Website: paralympics.org.nz

in Rio de Janeiro
- Competitors: 31 in 6 sports
- Flag bearers: Holly Robinson (opening); Liam Malone (closing)
- Medals Ranked 13th: Gold 9 Silver 5 Bronze 7 Total 21

Summer Paralympics appearances (overview)
- 1968; 1972; 1976; 1980; 1984; 1988; 1992; 1996; 2000; 2004; 2008; 2012; 2016; 2020; 2024

New Zealand competed at the 2016 Summer Paralympics in Rio de Janeiro, Brazil, from 7 to 18 September 2016. It was the nation's thirteenth appearance at the Summer Paralympics, having made its debut in 1968 and appeared in every edition since.

The 31-member delegation collected 21 medals at the Games: nine gold, five silver and seven bronze. This was the second-largest number of medals won by New Zealand behind the 1984 Games, while the number of gold medals achieved equalling the record of nine achieved at the 1996 Games. The medals won exceeded High Performance Sport New Zealand's target of 18 medals overall, but fell short of the second target of 12 gold medals. Swimming and athletics dominated the medal tally with ten and nine medals respectively; the remaining two medals were both achieved in cycling.

Swimmer Sophie Pascoe achieved three gold medals and two silver medals, taking her total medal haul to nine golds and six silvers and overtaking Eve Rimmer to become New Zealand's most decorated Paralympian. Her silver medal in the 50 m freestyle S10 is New Zealand's 200th overall Paralympic medal. Fellow swimmers Mary Fisher, Nikita Howarth and Cameron Leslie won single gold medals, with Leslie completing a hat-trick with his third consecutive gold medal in the 150 m individual medley SM4. Sprinter Liam Malone won gold medals in the 200 m and 400 m T44 events, while fellow athlete Anna Grimaldi won the gold medal in the long jump T47.

== Medallists ==
Unless otherwise stated, all dates and times are in Brasília time (UTC−3), fifteen hours behind New Zealand Standard Time (UTC+12).

Medal	Name	Sport	Event	Date
Gold	Anna Grimaldi	Athletics	Women's long jump T47	8 September
Gold	Mary Fisher	Swimming	Women's 100 m backstroke S11	9 September
Gold	Sophie Pascoe	Swimming	Women's 100 m backstroke S10	10 September
Gold	Sophie Pascoe	Swimming	Women's 200 m individual medley S10	11 September
Gold	Cameron Leslie	Swimming	Men's 150 m individual medley SM4	12 September
Gold	Sophie Pascoe	Swimming	Women's 100 m butterfly S10	12 September
Gold	Liam Malone	Athletics	Men's 200 metres T44	12 September
Gold	Nikita Howarth	Swimming	Women's 200 m individual medley S7	13 September
Gold	Liam Malone	Athletics	Men's 400 metres T44	15 September
Silver	Sophie Pascoe	Swimming	Women's 50 m freestyle S10	9 September
Silver	Liam Malone	Athletics	Men's 100 metres T44	9 September
Silver	Emma Foy; Laura Thompson (pilot)	Cycling	Women's individual pursuit B	11 September
Silver	Holly Robinson	Athletics	Women's javelin throw F46	13 September
Silver	Sophie Pascoe	Swimming	Women's 100 m freestyle S10	13 September
Bronze	Rebecca Dubber	Swimming	Women's 100 m backstroke S7	8 September
Bronze	Rory McSweeney	Athletics	Men's javelin throw T44	9 September
Bronze	Nikita Howarth	Swimming	Women's 50 m butterfly S7	12 September
Bronze	Jess Hamill	Athletics	Women's shot put F34	14 September
Bronze	William Stedman	Athletics	Men's 400 metres T36	16 September
Bronze	Emma Foy; Laura Thompson (pilot)	Cycling	Women's road race B	17 September
Bronze	William Stedman	Athletics	Men's 800 metres T36	17 September

Medals by sport
Sport	Gold medal	Silver medal	Bronze medal	Total
Swimming	6	2	2	10
Athletics	3	2	4	9
Cycling	0	1	1	2
Total	9	5	7	21

Medals by date
Date	Gold medal	Silver medal	Bronze medal	Total
8 September	1	0	1	2
9 September	1	2	1	4
10 September	1	0	0	1
11 September	1	1	0	2
12 September	3	0	1	4
13 September	1	2	0	3
14 September	0	0	1	1
15 September	1	0	0	1
16 September	0	0	1	1
17 September	0	0	2	2
Total	9	5	7	21

Medals by gender
Gender	Gold medal	Silver medal	Bronze medal	Total
Female	6	4	4	14
Male	3	1	3	7
Total	9	5	7	21

== Delegation ==
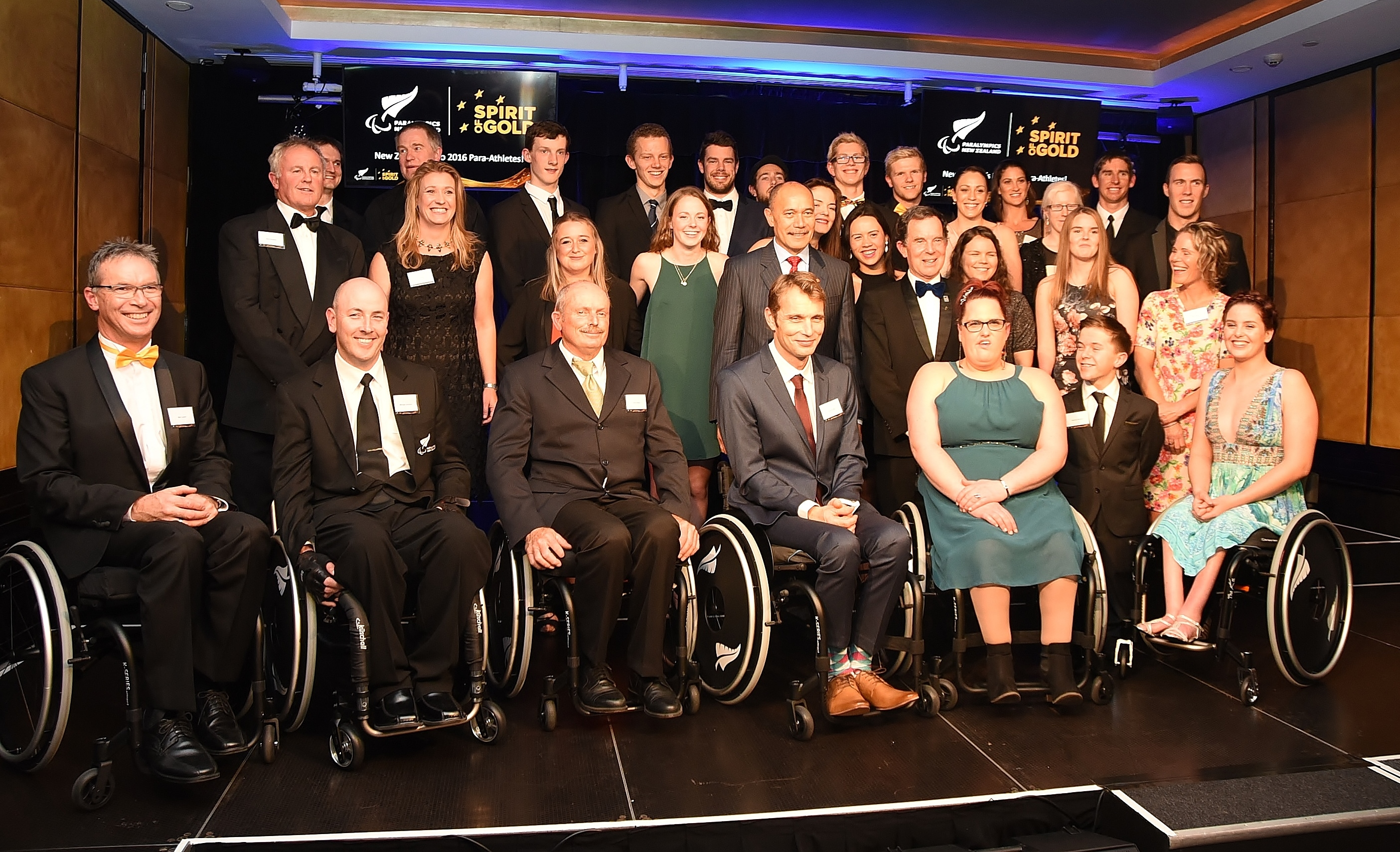
The New Zealand team and officials with Governor General Jerry Mateparae at the official presentation of the team, 19 July 2016.

Paralympics New Zealand confirmed a team of 29 athletes, 17 male and 14 female, and two cycling pilots (both female) to compete in six sports. Ten competitors had attended previous Paralympic games, with the remaining 21 made their Paralympics debut. Returning gold medallists included swimmers Mary Fisher, Cameron Leslie and Sophie Pascoe, sports shooter Michael Johnson, and tandem cycling pilot Laura Thompson. Javelin thrower Holly Robinson, ranked number one in the world entering the games, was selected as the country's flagbearer for the opening ceremony.

The median age of the New Zealand delegation was 25 years. Fifteen-year-old swimmer Tupou Neiufi was New Zealand's youngest competitor, while 58-year-old sailor Chris Sharp was the oldest competitor.

Sport	Men	Women	Total
Athletics	4	4	8
Canoeing	1	0	1
Cycling	3	3 (+2)	6 (+2)
Sailing	3	0	3
Shooting	3	0	3
Swimming	3	5	8
Total	17	12 (+2)	29 (+2)

== Support staff and officials ==
Retired wheelchair racer Ben Lucas was appointed New Zealand's chef de mission for the 2016 Paralympic Games. Lucas had previously represented New Zealand as an athlete at the 1994 Commonwealth Games, and the 1996 and 2000 Summer Paralympics.

The New Zealand delegation also included Doping Control Officer Daniel Mulholland from Upper Hutt. He was the only representative from Drug Free Sport NZ in Rio.

== Funding ==
High Performance Sport New Zealand (HPSNZ) invested $12.7 million in Paralympic sports and athletes over the 2013–16 funding cycle, of which $7.5 million was core funding to national sports organisations and Paralympics New Zealand (PNZ) while the remaining $5.2 million was mainly in the form of grants and tertiary scholarships to individual athletes. These totals include funding for non-Paralympic events such as world championships as well as the 2014 Winter Paralympics.

== Media coverage ==
Attitude Pictures and Television New Zealand hold the New Zealand coverage rights for the 2016 Paralympics. Live and delayed coverage screened on TVNZ's Duke channel, with a daily highlights show on TV One and on-demand highlights through TVNZ on Demand and Attitude Live.

== Athletics ==
New Zealand achieved two silver medals at the 2015 IPC Athletics World Championships, earning the nation two qualification slots at the Rio Paralympics.

Paralympics New Zealand confirmed a team of six track and field athletes on 23 May 2016, with an additional two athletes named on 7 July 2016.

Key

- Note–Ranks given for preliminary rounds are within the athlete's heat only.
- Q = Qualified for the next round
- q = Qualified for the next round as a fastest loser
- DSQ = Disqualified
- PR = Paralympic record
- WR = World record
- N/A = Round not applicable for the event

=== Track ===
Athlete	Event	Heat		Final	
Athlete	Event	Result	Rank	Result	Rank
Anna Grimaldi	Women's 100 m T47	12.88	4 q	12.96	4
Anna Grimaldi	Women's 200 m T47	DQ (Note: Finished third in heat, but was disqualified for a lane infringement)		did not advance	
Liam Malone	Men's 100 m T44	10.90	1 Q	11.02	2nd place, silver medalist(s)
Liam Malone	Men's 200 m T44	21.33	1 Q	21.06 PR	1st place, gold medalist(s)
Liam Malone	4Men's 00 m T44	48.34	2 Q	46.20 PR	1st place, gold medalist(s)
William Stedman	Men's 400 m T36	—N/a		55.69	3rd place, bronze medalist(s)
William Stedman	Men's 800 m T36	—N/a		2:11.98	3rd place, bronze medalist(s)
Jacob Phillips	Men's 100 m T35	14.27	4 q	14.14	8
Jacob Phillips	Men's 200 m T35	28.78	5 q	29.10	8

=== Field ===
Athlete	Event	Final	
Athlete	Event	Distance	Position
Caitlin Dore	Women's javelin throw F37	20.87	7
Anna Grimaldi	Women's long jump T47	5.62	1st place, gold medalist(s)
Jess Hamill	Women's shot put F34	7.54	3rd place, bronze medalist(s)
Rory McSweeney	Men's javelin throw F44	54.99	3rd place, bronze medalist(s)
Holly Robinson	Women's javelin throw F46	41.22	2nd place, silver medalist(s)
William Stedman	Men's long jump T36	5.35	5

== Canoeing ==
New Zealand was awarded a slot in the para-canoe competitionas a result of the IPC reallocating slots from the banned Russian delegation.

Athlete	Event	Heats		Semifinals		Final	
Athlete	Event	Time	Rank	Time	Rank	Time	Rank
Scott Martlew	Men's 200 m KL3	46.024	4 SF	44.284	4 FA	43.921	8

== Cycling ==
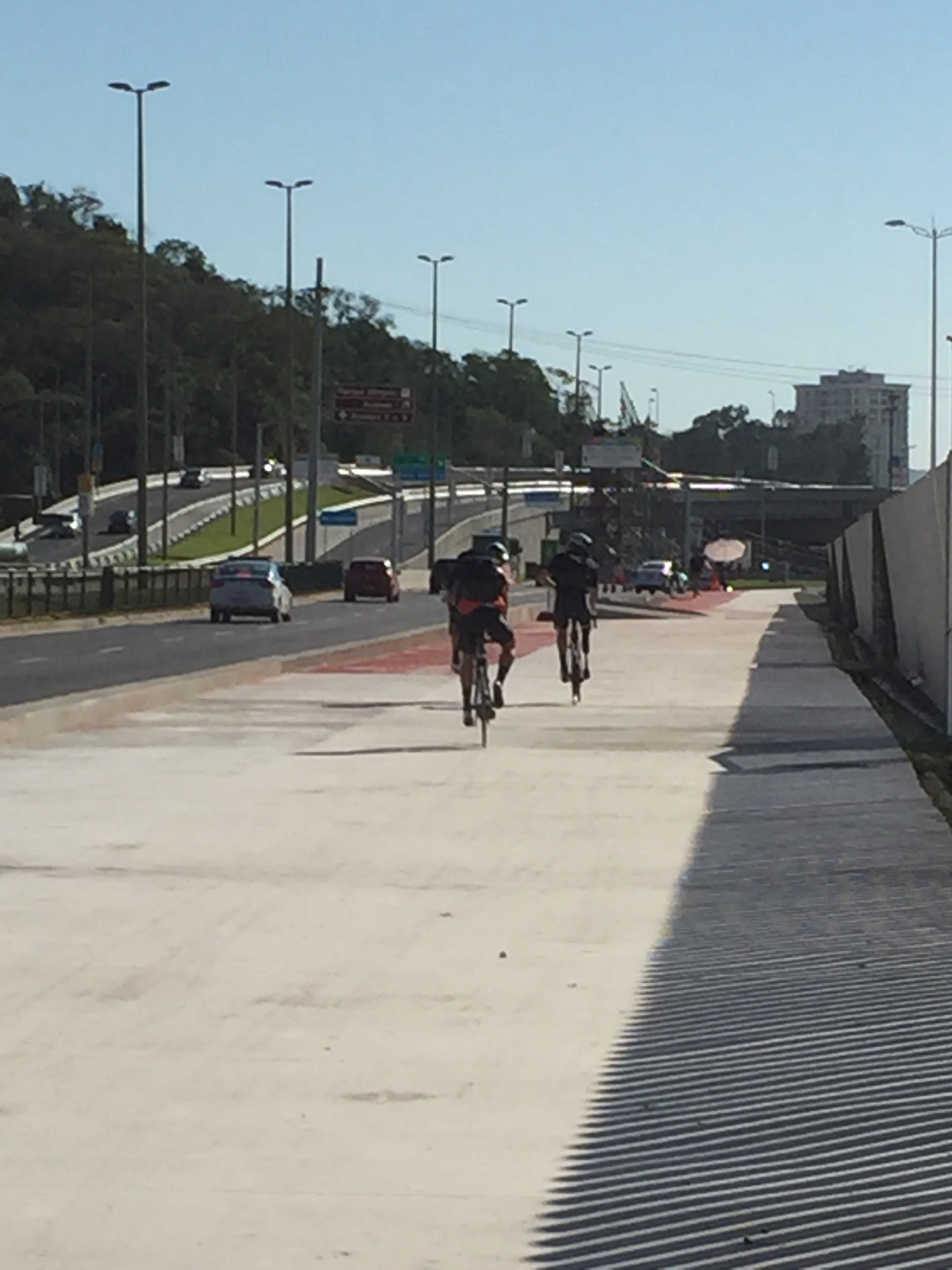
New Zealand cyclists riding outside the Paralympic venues before the Rio Games.

With one pathway for qualification being one highest ranked NPCs on the UCI Para-Cycling male and female Nations Ranking Lists on 31 December 2014, New Zealand qualified for the 2016 Summer Paralympics in Rio, assuming they continued to meet all other eligibility requirements. Paralympics New Zealand confirmed seven cyclists, including two sighted pilots, on 9 May 2016. The team includes sighted pilot Laura Thompson, who won three medals with Phillipa Gray in 2012, and 2008 athletics silver medallist turned cyclist Kate Horan. An eighth cyclist, Fraser Sharp, was added to the team on 30 August 2016 as a result of the IPC reallocating slots from the banned Russian delegation.

Men
Road

Athlete	Event	Final	
Athlete	Event	Result	Rank
Stephen Hills	Road race T1/2	54:23	8
Stephen Hills	Time trial T1/2	26:23.64	8
Fraser Sharp	Road race C1/2/3	1:51:48	11
Fraser Sharp	Time trial C3	42:20.07	8

Track

Athlete	Event	Qualification		Final	
Athlete	Event	Result	Rank	Result	Rank
Byron Raubenheimer	1000 m time trial C4/5	—N/a		1:08.819	11
Byron Raubenheimer	Individual pursuit C4	5:08.570	10	did not advance	

Women
Road

Athlete	Event	Final	
Athlete	Event	Result	Rank
Amanda Cameron; Hannah Van Kampen (pilot)	Road race B	2:07:41	11
Amanda Cameron; Hannah Van Kampen (pilot)	Time trial B	42:29.93	9
Emma Foy; Laura Thompson (pilot)	Road race B	1:59:33	3rd place, bronze medalist(s)
Emma Foy; Laura Thompson (pilot)	Time trial B	39:45.87	4
Kate Horan	Time trial C4	33:32.37	8

Track

Athlete	Event	Qualification		Final	
Athlete	Event	Result	Rank	Result	Rank
Amanda Cameron; Hannah Van Kampen (pilot)	1000 m time trial B	—N/a		1:11.737	6
Amanda Cameron; Hannah Van Kampen (pilot)	Individual pursuit B	3:33.298	4 q	LAP	4
Emma Foy; Laura Thompson (pilot)	1000 m time trial B	—N/a		1:10.187	4
Emma Foy; Laura Thompson (pilot)	Individual pursuit B	3:28.563	2 Q	3:31.569	2nd place, silver medalist(s)
Kate Horan	500 m time trial C4/5	—N/a		37.750	6
Kate Horan	Individual pursuit C4	4:02.608	3 q	4:04.437	4

== Sailing ==
One pathway for qualifying for Rio involved having a boat have top seven finish at the 2015 Combined World Championships in a medal event where the country had nor already qualified through via the 2014 IFDS Sailing World Championships. New Zealand qualified for the 2016 Games under this criterion in the Sonar event with an eighth-place finish overall and the third country who had not qualified via the 2014 Championships. They qualified a second boat in the SKUD 18 event with a twelfth-place finish overall and the fourth country who had not qualified via the 2014 Championships. The boat was crewed by Tim Dempsey and Gemma Fletcher.

Paralympics New Zealand announce the first three sailors to compete in the Sonar keelboat on 3 March 2016.

Athlete	Event	Race											Points		Rank
Athlete	Event	1	2	3	4	5	6	7	8	9	10	M*	Tot	Net	Rank
Richard Dodson; Andrew May; Chris Sharp	Three-person keelboat (Sonar)	8	1	6	4	6	4	8	8	~~11~~	4	2	62	51	4

== Shooting ==
The first opportunity to qualify for shooting at the Rio Games took place at the 2014 IPC Shooting World Championships in Suhl. Shooters earned spots for their NPC. New Zealand earned a qualifying spot at this competition in the R5 – 10m Air Rifle Prone Mixed SH2 event as a result of the performance of Michael Johnson.

The third opportunity for direct qualification for shooters to the Rio Paralympics took place at the 2015 IPC IPC Shooting World Cup in Sydney, Australia. At this competition, Jason Eales earned a qualifying spot for their country in the R5- Mixed 10m Air Rifle Prone SH2 event.

The last direct qualifying event for Rio in shooting took place at the 2015 IPC Shooting World Cup in Fort Benning in November. Greg Reid earned a qualifying spot for their country at this competition in the R3 Mixed 10m Air Rifle Prone SH1 event.

Paralympics New Zealand confirmed Michael Johnson, Jason Eales and Greg Reid to compete at the Games on 14 June 2016.

Athlete	Event	Qualification		Final	
Athlete	Event	Score	Rank	Score	Rank
Jason Eales	Mixed R5 – 10 m rifle prone SH2	631.1	17	did not advance	
Michael Johnson	Mixed R4 – 10 m rifle standing SH2	633.4	4 Q	142.4	5
Michael Johnson	Mixed R5 – 10 m rifle prone SH2	625.9	31	did not advance	
Greg Reid	Mixed R3 – 10 m rifle prone SH1	632.5	7 Q	103.7	7
Greg Reid	Mixed R6 – 50 m rifle prone SH1	596.1	37	did not advance	

== Swimming ==
Swimming got a bump in funding through their NPC and the national swimming federation to help with New Zealand swimming readiness in Rio.

The top two swimmers in each event at the 2015 IPC Swimming World Championships in Glasgow earned a qualification slot for their NPC at the 2016 Summer Paralympics. Five swimmers earned fourteen gold and silver medals for New Zealand, earning the nation five qualification slots.

Paralympics New Zealand confirmed a team of seven swimmers on 5 May 2016. The team includes three 2012 gold medalists: Mary Fisher, Cameron Leslie and Sophie Pascoe. On 13 May 2016, an eighth swimmer, Hamish McLean, was added to the team. Tupou Neiufi was added to the team on 9 August 2016 after Bryall McPherson withdrew from participation due to illness and injury.

Key

- Note– Qualifiers for the finals (Q) of all events were decided on a time only basis, therefore ranks shown are overall ranks versus competitors in all heats. Also, ranks shown for those who did not advance are their final ranks.
- PR = Paralympic record
- WR = World record
- N/A = Round not applicable for the event

Men

Athlete	Event	Heat		Final	
Athlete	Event	Time	Rank	Time	Rank
Cameron Leslie	200 m freestyle S5	2:52.21	5 Q	2:52.10	8
Cameron Leslie	50 m backstroke S5	41.30	7 Q	42.26	8
Cameron Leslie	150 m individual medley SM4	2:29.36	1 Q	2:23.12 WR	1st place, gold medalist(s)
Hamish McLean	50 m freestyle S6	34.81	19	did not advance	
Hamish McLean	100 m freestyle S6	1:15.30	17	did not advance	
Hamish McLean	400 m freestyle S6	5:22.88	6 Q	5:30.63	7
Hamish McLean	200 m individual medley SM6	2:59.81	9	did not advance	
Jesse Reynolds	400 m freestyle S9	4:35.04	10	did not advance	
Jesse Reynolds	100 m backstroke S9	1:06.34	7 Q	1:05.57	7
Jesse Reynolds	100 m butterfly S9	1:04.50	9 Q	1:04.31	8

Women

Athlete	Event	Heat		Final	
Athlete	Event	Time	Rank	Time	Rank
Rebecca Dubber	100 m freestyle S7	1:18.85	9	did not advance	
Rebecca Dubber	400 m freestyle S7	—N/a		5:31.53	4
Rebecca Dubber	100 m backstroke S7	1:23.62	2 Q	1:23.85	3rd place, bronze medalist(s)
Mary Fisher	50 m freestyle S11	31.35	3 Q	31.80	6
Mary Fisher	100 m freestyle S11	1:11.85	5 Q	1:09.47	4
Mary Fisher	400 m freestyle S11	5:33.64	4 Q	5:28.28	4
Mary Fisher	100 m backstroke S11	1:18.68 PR	1 Q	1:17.96 WR	1st place, gold medalist(s)
Mary Fisher	200 m individual medley SM11	3:00.69	5 Q	2:55.71	6
Nikita Howarth	100 m backstroke S7	1:24.69	3 Q	1:25.37	6
Nikita Howarth	100 m breaststroke SB8	1:33.70	7 Q	1:31.11	7
Nikita Howarth	50 m butterfly S7	35.40	1 Q	35.97	3rd place, bronze medalist(s)
Nikita Howarth	200 m individual medley SM7	2:58.82	1 Q	2:57.29	1st place, gold medalist(s)
Tupou Neiufi	50 m freestyle S9	31.37	15	did not advance	
Tupou Neiufi	100 m freestyle S9	1:11.21	22	did not advance	
Tupou Neiufi	100 m backstroke S9	1:15.68	8 Q	1:14.94	7
Sophie Pascoe	50 m freestyle S10	27.95	2 Q	27.72	2nd place, silver medalist(s)
Sophie Pascoe	100 m freestyle S10	1:01.54	2 Q	59.85	2nd place, silver medalist(s)
Sophie Pascoe	100 m backstroke S10	1:07.23	1 Q	1:07.04	1st place, gold medalist(s)
Sophie Pascoe	100 m butterfly S10	1:04.37 PR	1 Q	1:02.65 PR	1st place, gold medalist(s)
Sophie Pascoe	200 m individual medley SM10	2:27.44	1 Q	2:24.90 WR	1st place, gold medalist(s)

== See also ==
- New Zealand at the 2016 Summer Olympics
