= Utkirjon Nigmatov =

Uzbekistani Paralympic judoka

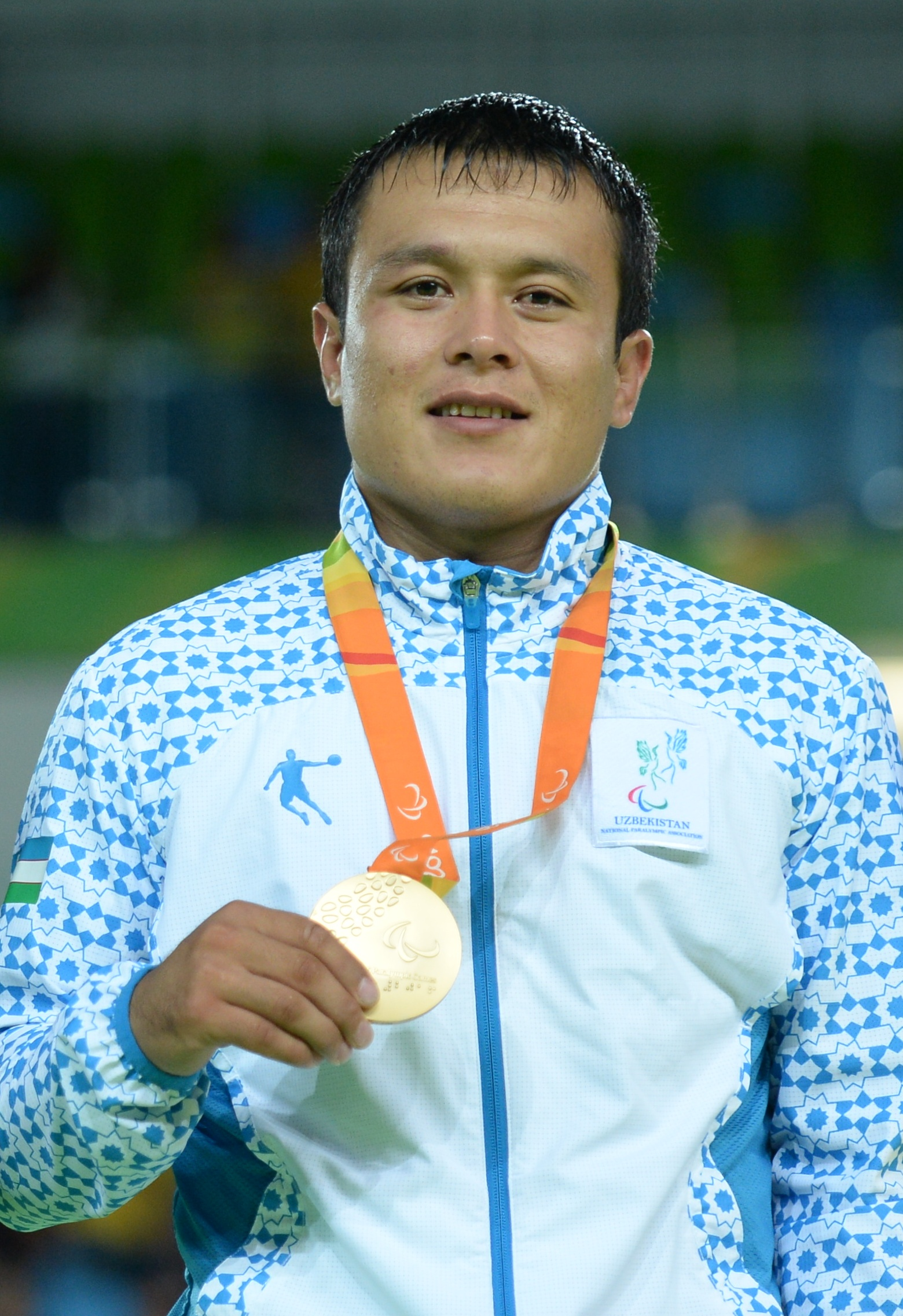
- Asila Mirzayorova at the 2016 Summer Paralympics

Personal information
- Native name: Oʻtkirjon Nigmatov
- Citizenship: Uzbek
- Born: 10 September 1990 (age 35) Samarkand region Uzbek SSR
- Weight: up to 66 kg

Sport
- Country: Uzbekistan
- Sport: judoka
- Disability: visually impaired
- Event: judo
Medal record
Representing Uzbekistan
Paralympic Games
Judo
Gold medal – first place	2016 Rio de Janeiro	66 kg
Asian Para Games
Gold medal – first place	2018 Jakarta	66 kg
Bronze medal – third place	2018 Jakarta	Team
IBSA World Championships
Silver medal – second place	2014 Colorado, USA	Individual
Gold medal – first place	2018 Lisbon, Portugal	Individual
IBSA World Games
Gold medal – first place	2015 Seul, South Korea	Individual
IBSA World Cup
Bronze medal – third place	2017 Antalya, Turkey	Individual
Bronze medal – third place	2020 Tbilisi, Georgia	Individual
IBSA Judo Grand Prix
Silver medal – second place	2021 Baku, Azerbaijan	Individual

Utkirjon Nigmatov (born 10 September 1990) is an Uzbek judoka and Paralympian competing in the weight category up to 66 kg. He is the champion of the 2016 Summer Paralympic Games, a medalist in World Championships, winner of the Summer Para Asian Games, and a medalist in World Cup and Grand Prix events in Para Judo.

== Career ==
In 2014, at the World Judo Championships for the visually impaired in Colorado, USA, he won a silver medal in his weight category, losing in the final to Bayram Mustafayev from Azerbaijan. In 2015, at the World Games for the Blind and Visually Impaired in Seoul, South Korea, in the judo competition in the weight category up to 66 kg, he claimed victory in the final over Mongolian judoka Munkhbat Aajim.

In 2016, at the Summer Paralympic Games in Rio de Janeiro, Brazil, in the weight category up to 66 kg, he secured a victory in the final over Azerbaijani judoka Bayram Mustafayev, earning an Olympic gold medal. In the same year, the President of Uzbekistan, Shavkat Mirziyoyev, awarded Utkirjon the honorary title " Oʻzbekiston iftixori" ("Pride of Uzbekistan").

In 2018, at the Summer Para Asian Games in Jakarta, Indonesia, in the weight category up to 66 kg, he emerged victorious in the final against Kazakh judoka Azamat Turumbetov, winning the gold medal for the games. At the same competition, he also secured a bronze medal as part of the Uzbekistan team. In the same year, at the World Judo Championships for the visually impaired in Lisbon, Portugal, he won a bronze medal in his weight category.

In 2021, he won silver at the Grand Prix stage of visually impaired and partially sighted judo in Baku, Azerbaijan, in the weight category up to 66 kg, losing in the final to the Azerbaijani Namig Abbasli.

== Medals ==
=== IBSA World Championships ===
Year	Location	Event	Position
2014	Colorado, United States	Individual Judo	2nd
2018	Lisbon, Portugal	Individual Judo	1st

=== IBSA World Games ===
Year	Location	Event	Position
2015	(North Korea) Seoul, South Korea	Individual Judo	1st

=== Paralympic Games ===
Year	Location	Event	Position
2016	Rio de Janeiro, Brazil	Individual Judo	1st

=== IBSA World Cup ===
Year	Location	Event	Position
2017	Antalya, Turkey	Individual Judo	3rd
2020	(Georgia (country)) Tbilisi, Georgia	Individual Judo	3rd

=== Asian Para Games Jakarta ===
Year	Location	Event	Position
2018	Jakarta, Indonesia	Individual Judo	1st

=== IBSA Judo Grand Prix ===
Year	Location	Event	Position
2021	Baku, Azerbaijan	Individual Judo	2nd
