= Feruz Sayidov =

Uzbekistani Paralympic judoka (born 1987)

Personal information
- Born: 7 October 1987 (age 38)
- Occupation: Judoka

Sport
- Country: Uzbekistan
- Sport: Para judo
Medal record
Paralympic Games
Gold medal – first place	2020 Tokyo	73 kg
Bronze medal – third place	2016 Rio de Janeiro	73 kg
Asian Para Games
Gold medal – first place	2014 Incheon	73 kg
Silver medal – second place	2018 Jakarta	73 kg
Silver medal – second place	2022 Hangzhou	73 kg
Islamic Solidarity Games
Silver medal – second place	2017 Baku	−73 kg

Profile at external databases
- IJF: 64934
- JudoInside.com: 87331

Feruz Sayidov (born 7 October 1987) is an Uzbekistani para judoka. He is a two-time medalist, including gold, at the Summer Paralympics.

== Career ==
He represented Uzbekistan at the 2016 Summer Paralympics held in Rio de Janeiro, Brazil and won a bronze medal in the men's 73 kg event. He won a gold medal in the men's 73 kg event at the 2020 Summer Paralympics held in Tokyo, Japan.

At the 2017 Islamic Solidarity Games held in Baku, Azerbaijan, he won the silver medal in the men's −73 kg event.
