= Sevinch Salaeva =

Uzbek judoka (born 1995)

Personal information
- National team: Uzbekistan
- Born: March 12, 1995 (age 31)

Sport
- Country: Uzbekistan
- Sport: Judo
- Weight class: 52 kilograms (115 lb)
Medal record
Women's judo
Representing Uzbekistan
Summer Paralympics
Bronze medal – third place	2016 Rio de Janeiro	52 kg
Asian Para Games
Gold medal – first place	2014 Incheon	52 kg
Bronze medal – third place	2018 Jakarta	52 kg
IBSA Asian Games
Gold medal – first place	2017 Tashkent	52 kg
- Updated on 16 November 2017

Sevinch Salaeva (born March 12, 1995), is an Uzbek Judoka, who competes for her nation, Uzbekistan. She won a bronze medal in the 52 kilograms (115 lb) weight class at the 2016 Summer Paralympics.

== Career ==
Sevinch Salaeva was born on March 12, 1995. She trained in judo at the Khorezm Judo School. She took part in the International Blind Sports Federation World Championships in Colorado, United States, in 2014, where she placed fifth overall. Later that year, she won her weight class at the 2014 Asian Para Games in Incheon, South Korea. Salaeva placed fifth once again at the IBSA World Games in Seoul, South Korea.

At the Paralympic Judo Grand Prix event in Rio de Janeiro in March 2016, held as a warm up to that year's Summer Paralympics, Salaeva placed second in the women's 52 kilograms (115 lb) category. At the 2016 Games themselves in September that year, Salaeva took part in the first day of the competition. She was defeated in the semi-finals of the Judo tournament in the 52 kg class, but went on to win the bronze medal match against Canadian Priscilla Gagné. This was Uzbekistan's most successful day so far at the Paralympics, as the nation had only previously won a single medal at the 2012 Summer Paralympics in London, England. Alongside Salaeva's bronze medal, two further gold medals were added.
