= Kirill Pankov =

Uzbekistani Paralympic swimmer

Sport
- Country: Uzbekistan
- Sport: Paralympic swimming
- Disability: Vision impairment
- Disability class: S13
Medal record
Men's Paralympic swimming
Representing Uzbekistan
Paralympic Games
| Silver medal – second place | 2016 Rio de Janeiro | 100 m butterfly S13 |
Asian Para Games
| Gold medal – first place | 2018 Jakarta | 100 m backstroke S13 |
| Silver medal – second place | 2018 Jakarta | 100 m butterfly S13 |
| Bronze medal – third place | 2022 Hangzhou | 100 m butterfly S13 |

Kirill Pankov is a visually impaired Uzbekistani Paralympic swimmer. He is a silver medalist at the 2016 Summer Paralympics held in Rio de Janeiro, Brazil.

== Career ==
He represented Uzbekistan at the 2012 and 2016 Summer Paralympics. He won one medal: the silver medal in the men's 100 metre butterfly S13 event at the 2016 Summer Paralympics.

He is trained by his father.
