= Shokhsanamkhon Toshpulatova =

Uzbekistani Paralympic swimmer (born 1997)

Personal information
- Born: 4 May 1997 (age 29) Andijan, Uzbekistan

Sport
- Country: Uzbekistan
- Sport: Paralympic swimming
- Disability class: S13
Medal record
Paralympic Games
Bronze medal – third place	2016 Rio de Janeiro	50 m freestyle S13
Bronze medal – third place	2016 Rio de Janeiro	200 m individual medley SM13
Bronze medal – third place	2020 Tokyo	200 m individual medley SM13
World Championships
Gold medal – first place	2019 London	100 m butterfly S13
Asian Para Games
Gold medal – first place	2018 Jakarta	100 m backstroke S13
Gold medal – first place	2018 Jakarta	100 m butterfly S13
Gold medal – first place	2018 Jakarta	400 m freestyle S13
Silver medal – second place	2018 Jakarta	50 m freestyle S13
Silver medal – second place	2018 Jakarta	100 m freestyle S13
Silver medal – second place	2018 Jakarta	100 m breaststroke SB13
Silver medal – second place	2018 Jakarta	200 m medley SM13

Shokhsanamkhon Toshpulatova (born 4 May 1997) is an Uzbekistani Paralympic swimmer. She represented Uzbekistan at the 2016 Summer Paralympics held in Rio de Janeiro, Brazil and she won two bronze medals: in the women's 50 metre freestyle S13 and women's 200 metre individual medley SM13 events.

At the 2019 World Para Swimming Championships held in London, United Kingdom, she became the first Uzbekistani swimmer to win a gold medal at the World Para Swimming Championships. She won the gold medal in the women's 100 metre butterfly S13 event.

She also represented Uzbekistan at the 2020 Summer Paralympics held in Tokyo, Japan. She won the bronze medal in the women's 200 metre individual medley SM13 event.
