= Muslima Odilova =

Uzbekistani Paralympic swimmer

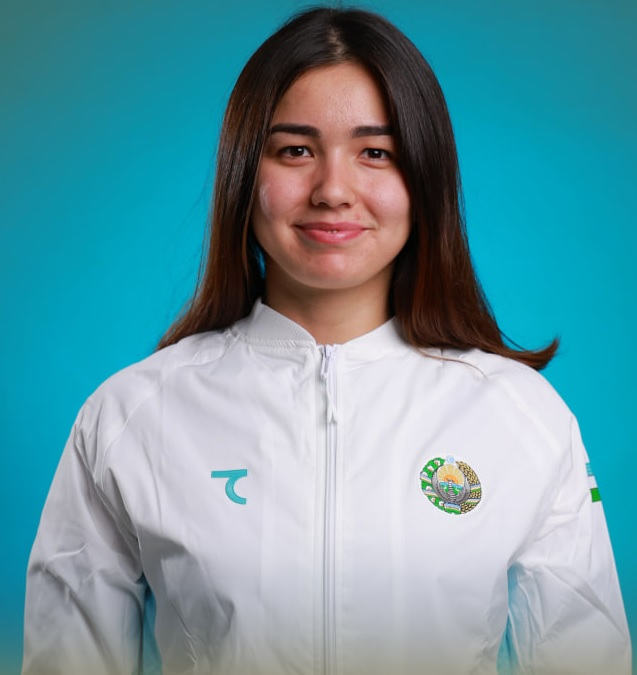

Personal information
- Born: June 20, 1998 (age 28)

Sport
- Country: Uzbekistan
- Sport: Paralympic swimming
- Disability class: S13
Medal record
Paralympic Games
Silver medal – second place	2016 Rio de Janeiro	50 m freestyle S13
Silver medal – second place	2016 Rio de Janeiro	100 m butterfly S13
Bronze medal – third place	2024 Paris	100 m butterfly S13

Muslima Odilova (born 20 June 1998) is an Uzbekistani Paralympic swimmer. She represented Uzbekistan at the 2016 Summer Paralympics held in Rio de Janeiro, Brazil and she won two silver medals: in the women's 50 metre freestyle S13 event and in the women's 100 metre butterfly S13 event.

Odilova represented Uzbekistan at the 2020 Summer Paralympics held in Tokyo, Japan. She competed in one event: the women's 100 metre butterfly S13 event. She also represented Uzbekistan at the 2024 Summer Paralympics in Paris, France. She won the bronze medal in the women's 100 metre butterfly S13 event.
