= Anna Stetsenko (swimmer) =

Ukrainian Paralympic swimmer

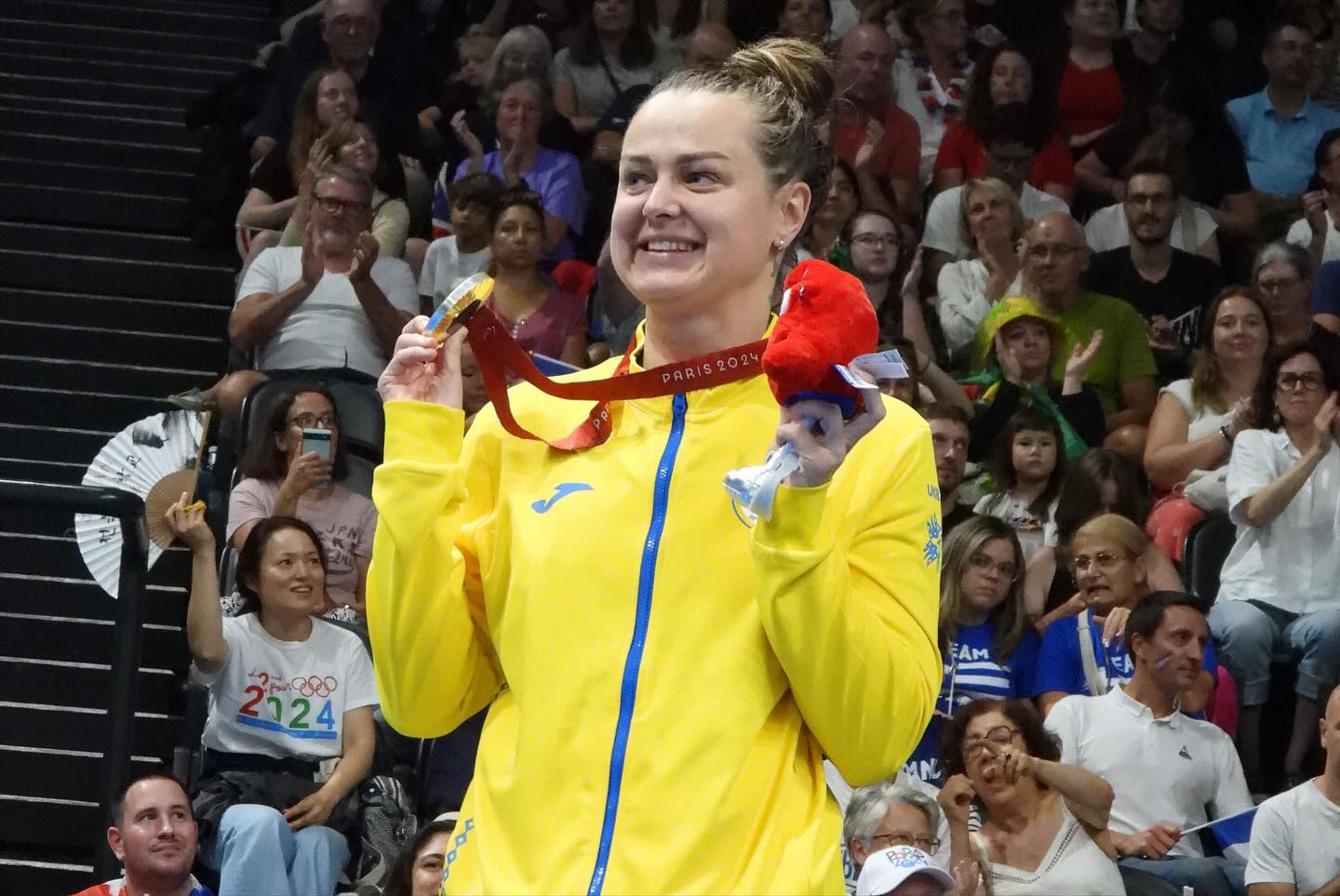
- Stetsenko at the 2024 Summer Paralympics

Personal information
- Nickname: Anya
- Born: 18 April 1992 (age 34) Soledar, Ukraine
- Home town: Dnipro, Ukraine

Sport
- Country: Ukraine
- Sport: Paralympic swimming
- Disability: Visual impairment
- Disability class: S13
- Club: Soledar Children's Youth Sport School, Ukraine
- Coached by: Gennady Vdovichenko (national); Oganes Mkrtchan (personal)
Medal record
Women's para swimming
Representing Ukraine
Paralympic Games
Gold medal – first place	2016 Rio de Janeiro	50m freestyle S13
Gold medal – first place	2016 Rio de Janeiro	100m backstroke S13
Gold medal – first place	2016 Rio de Janeiro	100m freestyle S13
Gold medal – first place	2020 Tokyo	400m freestyle S13
Gold medal – first place	2024 Paris	Mixed 4×100 m freestyle relay 49pts
Silver medal – second place	2016 Rio de Janeiro	400m freestyle S13
Silver medal – second place	2024 Paris	100 m freestyle S12
Silver medal – second place	2024 Paris	100m backstroke S12
Bronze medal – third place	2020 Tokyo	mixed 4×100 m freestyle relay 49pts
Bronze medal – third place	2024 Paris	400 m freestyle S13
World Championships
Gold medal – first place	2015 Glasgow	100m freestyle S13
Gold medal – first place	2019 London	4x100m freestyle relay (49 pts)
Gold medal – first place	2022 Madeira	400m freestyle S5
Silver medal – second place	2015 Glasgow	50m freestyle S13
Silver medal – second place	2015 Glasgow	100m backstroke S13
Silver medal – second place	2015 Glasgow	400m freestyle S13
Silver medal – second place	2019 London	100m freestyle S13
Silver medal – second place	2019 London	400m freestyle S13
Silver medal – second place	2023 Manchester	50m freestyle S12
Silver medal – second place	2023 Manchester	100m freestyle S12
Bronze medal – third place	2015 Glasgow	200m individual medley SM13
Bronze medal – third place	2019 London	50m freestyle S13
Bronze medal – third place	2022 Madeira	100m freestyle S12
Bronze medal – third place	2023 Manchester	400m freestyle S13
European Championships
Gold medal – first place	2016 Funchal	50m freestyle S13
Gold medal – first place	2016 Funchal	100m freestyle S13
Gold medal – first place	2016 Funchal	400m freestyle S13
Gold medal – first place	2018 Dublin	4x100m freestyle relay (49 pts)
Gold medal – first place	2020 Funchal	400m freestyle S13
Gold medal – first place	2020 Funchal	4x100m freestyle relay (49 pts)
Gold medal – first place	2020 Funchal	4x100m medley relay (49 pts)
Gold medal – first place	2024 Madeira	100m backstroke S12
Gold medal – first place	2024 Madeira	100m freestyle S12
Silver medal – second place	2016 Funchal	200m individual medley SM13
Silver medal – second place	2018 Dublin	50m freestyle S13
Silver medal – second place	2018 Dublin	100m freestyle S13
Silver medal – second place	2018 Dublin	100m backstroke S13
Silver medal – second place	2018 Dublin	200m individual medley SM13
Silver medal – second place	2020 Funchal	100m freestyle S13
Silver medal – second place	2024 Madeira	400m freestyle S13
Bronze medal – third place	2016 Funchal	100m backstroke S13
Bronze medal – third place	2020 Funchal	50m freestyle S13
Bronze medal – third place	2020 Funchal	200m individual medley SM13

Anna Stetsenko (born 18 April 1992) is a visually impaired Ukrainian Paralympic swimmer, competing in S13 class. She has won four gold medals in Summer Paralympics and two in the world championships. She also holds two current World records: in 50 m and 100 m freestyle.
