= Rebecca Meyers =

American Paralympic swimmer

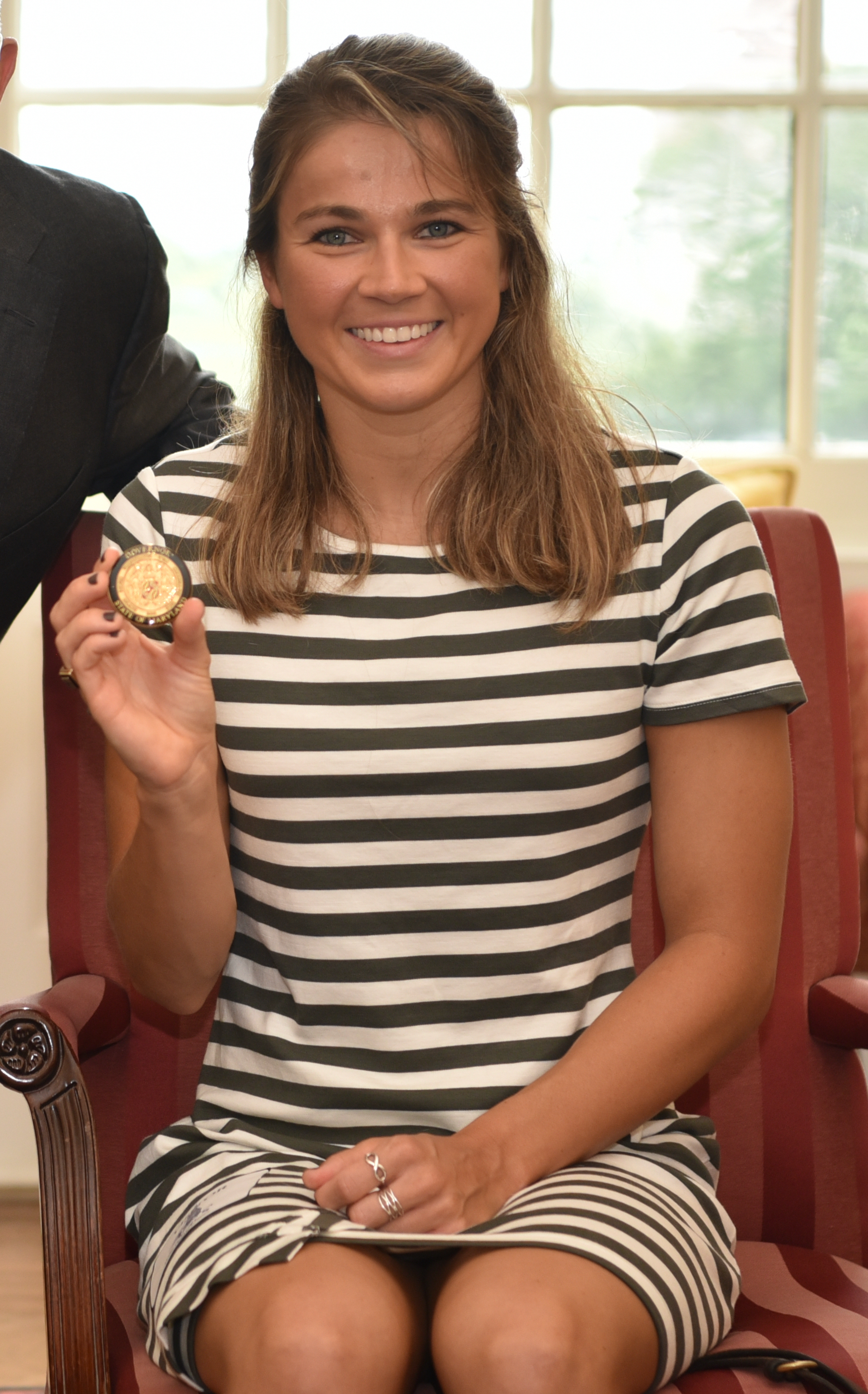
- Meyers during a visit to the Maryland State House in July 2021

Personal information
- Nickname: Becca
- Born: November 20, 1994 (age 31) Baltimore, Maryland, U.S.
- Website: Meyers on teamusa.org

Sport
- Country: USA
- Sport: Paralympic swimming
- Disability class: S12
- Club: Nation's Capital Swim Club and North Baltimore Aquatic Club
Medal record
Women's Swimming
Representing the United States
Event	1st	2nd	3rd
Paralympic Games	3	2	1
Deaflympics	0	0	1
Total	3	2	2
Paralympic Games
Gold medal – first place	2016 Rio de Janeiro	400 m freestyle S13
Gold medal – first place	2016 Rio de Janeiro	100 m butterfly S13
Gold medal – first place	2016 Rio de Janeiro	200 m medley SM13
Silver medal – second place	2012 London	200 m medley SM13
Silver medal – second place	2016 Rio de Janeiro	100 m freestyle S13
Bronze medal – third place	2012 London	100 m freestyle S13
Deaflympics
Bronze medal – third place	2009 Taipei	4×200m freestyle relay

Rebecca Meyers (born November 20, 1994) is an American Paralympic swimmer. She won three gold and one silver medals in Rio 2016. She was also a member of the 2012 Paralympic Team, and won a silver and bronze in London. Rebecca Meyers has also competed at the 2009 Summer Deaflympics which was held in Taiwan, which is also her only appearance at the Deaflympics. She also clinched a bronze medal in the 4 × 200 m freestyle relay event in the 2009 Summer Deaflympics.

== Biography ==
Meyers has Usher syndrome and has been deaf since she was born. Since she was young she has used a cochlear implant, an electronic device that allows her to hear. Meyers is also losing her vision to a disease called retinitis pigmentosa (RP), and has a Seeing Eye dog named Birdie, who helps her navigate the world.

In 2015 and 2017, Meyers received a Best Female Athlete with a Disability ESPY Award. She won gold in record time at the 2016 Summer Paralympics.

She grew up in Baltimore, attended Notre Dame Prep and went on to graduate from Franklin and Marshall College in Lancaster, Pennsylvania where she studied history with a concentration in Disability Studies. She was a club swimmer with Loyola Blakefield Aquatics for eleven years. In 2012, she joined North Baltimore Aquatic Club where Michael Phelps trained. Becca then switched to Nation's Capital Swim Club located in Bethesda, MD, where she trains under Bruce Gemmell, Katie Ledecky's coach. She holds multiple world records in the S13 and S12 classes.

In June 2021 the US announced the 34 Paralympic swimmers who would be going to the delayed 2020 Summer Paralympics in Tokyo. The women's team was Meyers, Jessica Long, McKenzie Coan, Elizabeth Marks and Mallory Weggemann. On July 20, 2021, Meyers withdrew from the Paralympics after being denied her request for a personal care assistant due to reduced allocation of staff members amid the COVID-19 pandemic.

== International ==
2019: London, England World Para Swimming Championships

- 1 gold medal: 400M Freestyle
- 1 silver medal: 200M Individual Medley
- 2 bronze medal: 100M Freestyle and 100M Butterfly
- Set 2 World Records: 400M Freestyle and 200M Individual Medley
- Set 5 American Records: 400M Freestyle, 200M Individual Medley, 100M Freestyle, 50M Freestyle, and 100M Breaststroke

2017: Mexico City, Mexico World Para Swimming Championships

- 1 gold medal: 400M Freestyle
- 2 silver medals: 100M Butterfly and 100M Freestyle
- 1 bronze medal: 100M breastroke

2015: Glasgow, Scotland IPC Swimming World Championships

- 2 gold medals: 200M Individual Medley and 400M Freestyle
- 1 silver medal: 100M Butterfly
- Set 2 world records in the S13 classification: 200M Individual Medley and 400M Freestyle

2014: Pasadena, California Pan Pac Para-Swimming Championships

- 4 gold medals: 100M Butterfly, 100M Freestyle, 400M Freestyle, and 200M Individual Medley
- 2 silver medals: 100M Breaststroke and 50M Freestyle
- Set 2 world record in the S13 classification: 200M Individual Medley and 400M Freestyle

2013: Montreal, Canada IPC Swimming World Championships

- 2 gold medals: 200M Individual Medley and 400M Freestyle
- 2 silver medals: 100M Butterfly and 100M Freestyle

2011: Coimbra, Portugal 3rd World Deaf Swimming Championships

- 4 gold medals: 200M Freestyle, 400M Freestyle, 800M Freestyle, and 4x200M Freestyle Relay
- Set world record in the 4x200M Freestyle Relay
- Set deaf world championship record in 800M Freestyle

2009 Deaflympics Taipei, Taiwan

- Bronze medal in the 4x200M Freestyle Relay
- Set American record in the 4x200M Freestyle Relay

== Awards and honors ==
2017:

- ESPN ESPY award winner: Best Female Athlete with a Disability
- Women's Sports Foundation Sportswoman of the Year Nominee.

2016:

- Trischa Zorn Award presented by USA Swimming
- Team USA Finalist: Female Athlete of the Paralympic Games
- NCAA DIII Swimming and Diving Championships: placed 6th overall in the 1650y freestyle; named to the All-America Team

2015:

- ESPN ESPY award winner Best Female Athlete with a Disability
- Team USA Female Paralympic Athlete of the Year Finalist

2011

- USADF Sportsperson of the Year presented by USA Deaf Sports Federation

== See also ==
- Swimming at the 2016 Summer Paralympics
