= Venezuela at the Paralympics =

- IPC code: VEN
- NPC: Comité Paralimpico Venezolano
- Medals: Gold 7 Silver 9 Bronze 14 Total 30

Summer appearances
- 1984; 1988; 1992; 1996; 2000; 2004; 2008; 2012; 2016; 2020; 2024

Venezuela made its Paralympic Games début at the 1984 Summer Paralympics in Stoke Mandeville and New York, sending five competitors in athletics and one in swimming. Absent from the Games in 1988, it returned in 1992, and has participated in every edition of the Summer Paralympics since then. Venezuela has never taken part in the Winter Paralympics.

Although never a major medal contender, Venezuela has improved its medal intake over time. Having won no medals in 1984 or 1996, a single bronze in 1992 (Yolmer Urdaneta's in the men's discus) and a single bronze also in 2000 (Ricardo Santana's in the men's 200m T13 in athletics), it achieved its first silver (Santana in the 100m) and two bronze in 2004. The country's first Paralympic gold medal was won in 2008 by Naomi Soazo in the women's up to 63kg in judo. 2020 marked Venezuela's highest achievement to date, with three gold, two silver, and two bronze.

The country's medal tally following the 2020 Games places it 73nd on the all-time Paralympic Games medal table.

== Medal tallies ==
=== Summer Paralympics ===
Event	Gold	Silver	Bronze	Total	Ranking
1984 Summer Paralympics	0	0	0	0	—
1988 Summer Paralympics	Did Not Participate				
1992 Summer Paralympics	0	0	1	1	50th
1996 Summer Paralympics	0	0	0	0	—
2000 Summer Paralympics	0	0	1	1	64th
2004 Summer Paralympics	0	1	2	3	63rd
2008 Summer Paralympics	1	1	2	4	46th
2012 Summer Paralympics	0	0	2	2	73rd
2016 Summer Paralympics	0	3	3	6	65th
2020 Summer Paralympics	3	2	2	7	38th
2024 Summer Paralympics	3	2	1	6	34th
Total	7	9	14	30	

== Medalists ==
Medal	Name	Games	Sport	Event
Bronze	Yolmer Urdaneta	(Spain) 1992 Barcelona	Athletics	Men's Discus throw B2
Bronze	Ricardo Santana	(Australia) 2000 Sydney	Athletics	Men's 200 m T13
Silver	Ricardo Santana	(Greece) 2004 Athens	Athletics	Men's 100 m T12
Bronze	Ricardo Santana	(Greece) 2004 Athens	Athletics	Men's 200 m T12
Bronze	Aníbal Bello; Oduver Daza; Ricardo Santana; José Villarreal	(Greece) 2004 Athens	Athletics	Men's 4x100m relay T11-13
Gold	Naomi Soazo	(China) 2008 Beijing	Judo	Women's -63 kg
Silver	Oduver Daza; Fernando Ferrer; Ricardo Santana; Yoldani Silva	(China) 2008 Beijing	Athletics	Men's 4x100m Relay T11-T13
Bronze	Reinaldo Caravallo	(China) 2008 Beijing	Judo	Men's -81 kg
Bronze	Samuel Colmenares	(China) 2008 Beijing	Athletics	Men's 400m - T46
Bronze	Marcos Falcón	(United Kingdom) 2012 London	Judo	Men's 66 kg
Bronze	Omar Monterola	(United Kingdom) 2012 London	Athletics	Men's 200 m T37
Silver	Luis Paiva	(Brazil) 2016 Rio de Janeiro	Athletics	Men's 400 m T20
Silver	Omar Monterola	(Brazil) 2016 Rio de Janeiro	Athletics	Men's 400 m T37
Silver	Sol Rojas	(Brazil) 2016 Rio de Janeiro	Athletics	Women's 400 m T11
Bronze	Rafael Uribe	(Brazil) 2016 Rio de Janeiro	Athletics	Men's high jump T44
Bronze	Yescarly Medina	(Brazil) 2016 Rio de Janeiro	Athletics	Women's 100 m T37
Bronze	Naomi Soazo	(Brazil) 2016 Rio de Janeiro	Judo	Women's 70 kg
Gold	Linda Patricia Pérez López	(Japan) 2020 Tokyo	Athletics	Women's 100 m T11
Gold	Lisbeli Vera Andrade	(Japan) 2020 Tokyo	Athletics	Women's 100 m T47
Gold	Lisbeli Vera Andrade	(Japan) 2020 Tokyo	Athletics	Women's 200 m T47
Silver	Luis Felipe Rodríguez	(Japan) 2020 Tokyo	Athletics	Men's 400 m T20
Silver	Lisbeli Vera Andrade	(Japan) 2020 Tokyo	Athletics	Women's 400 m T47
Bronze	Alejandra Paola Pérez López	(Japan) 2020 Tokyo	Athletics	Women's 400 m T12
Bronze	Clara Fuentes Monasterio	(Japan) 2020 Tokyo	Powerlifting	Women's 41 kg

== See also ==
- Venezuela at the Olympics
