= Venezuela at the 2008 Summer Paralympics =

- IPC code: VEN
- NPC: Comité Paralimpico Venezolano

in Beijing
- Competitors: 27 in 6 sports
- Medals Ranked 46th: Gold 1 Silver 1 Bronze 2 Total 4

Summer Paralympics appearances (overview)
- 1984; 1988; 1992; 1996; 2000; 2004; 2008; 2012; 2016; 2020; 2024

Venezuela sent a delegation to compete at the 2008 Summer Paralympics in Beijing. They won 1 gold, 1 silver and 2 bronze medals.

== Medalists ==
| Medal | Name | Sport | Event |
|---|---|---|---|
| Gold | Naomi Soazo | Judo | Women's 63 kg |
| Silver | Oduver Daza; Fernando Ferrer; Ricardo Santana; Yoldani Silva | Athletics | Men's 4 × 100 m Relay - T11-T13 |
| Bronze | Reinaldo Caravallo | Judo | Men's -81 kg |
| Bronze | Samuel Colmenares | Athletics | Men's 400m - T46 |

== Sports ==
=== Athletics ===
==== Men's track ====
| Athlete | Class | Event | Heats | | Semifinal | | Final | |
| Athlete | Class | Event | Result | Rank | Result | Rank | Result | Rank |
|---|---|---|---|---|---|---|---|---|
| Jesus Aguilar | T53 | 100m | 16.48 | 11 | did not advance | | | |
| Jesus Aguilar | T53 | 200m | 27.96 | 7 Q | —N/a | | 27.86 | 7 |
| Jesus Aguilar | T53 | 400m | 53.50 | 10 | did not advance | | | |
| Jose Camacho | T11 | 100m | 12.02 | 18 | did not advance | | | |
| Jose Camacho | T11 | 200m | 24.70 | 17 | did not advance | | | |
| Marcos Castillo | T52 | 100m | —N/a | | | | 18.23 | 5 |
| Marcos Castillo | T52 | 200m | —N/a | | | | 33.38 | 8 |
| Samuel Colmenares | T46 | 400m | 49.60 | 3 Q | —N/a | | 49.51 | 3rd place, bronze medalist(s) |
| Samuel Colmenares | T46 | 800m | 2:01.13 | 13 | did not advance | | | |
| Fernando Ferrer | T11 | 100m | 11.59 | 10 q | 11.67 | 10 | did not advance | |
| Rubeng Gomez | T46 | 100m | 11.42 | 13 | did not advance | | | |
| Rubeng Gomez | T46 | 200m | 24.23 | 20 | did not advance | | | |
| Willy Martinez | T46 | 100m | 11.61 | 14 | did not advance | | | |
| Willy Martinez | T46 | 200m | 23.35 | 10 | did not advance | | | |
| Willy Martinez | T46 | 400m | 50.87 | 10 | did not advance | | | |
| Luis Sanchez | T13 | 800m | —N/a | | | | 1:55.98 | 5 |
| Luis Sanchez | T13 | 1500m | 4:05.04 | 7 q | —N/a | | 4:10.44 | 9 |
| Ricardo Santana | T12 | 100m | 11.50 | 13 | did not advance | | | |
| Ricardo Santana | T12 | 200m | 23.32 | 12 q | DNF | | did not advance | |
| Yoldani Silva | T12 | 100m | 11.65 | 16 | did not advance | | | |
| Juan Valladares | T54 | 100m | 15.67 | 21 | did not advance | | | |
| Juan Valladares | T54 | 200m | 27.21 | 22 | did not advance | | | |
| Juan Valladares | T54 | 400m | 50.45 | 21 | did not advance | | | |
| Oduver Daza; Fernando Ferrer; Ricardo Santana; Yoldani Silva | T11-13 | 4 × 100 m relay | 44.76 | 3 Q | —N/a | | 43.55 | 2nd place, silver medalist(s) |

==== Men's field ====
| Athlete | Class | Event | Final | | |
| Athlete | Class | Event | Result | Points | Rank |
|---|---|---|---|---|---|
| Oduver Daza | F12 | Long jump | 5.98 | - | 12 |

==== Women's track ====
| Athlete | Class | Event | Heats | | Semifinal | | Final | |
| Athlete | Class | Event | Result | Rank | Result | Rank | Result | Rank |
|---|---|---|---|---|---|---|---|---|
| Tatiana del Carmen de Tovar | T12 | 100m | 12.95 | 6 Q | 12.89 | 7 B | 12.99 | 7 |
| Yadira Soturno | T53 | 100m | 18.88 | 10 | did not advance | | | |
| Yadira Soturno | T53 | 200m | 35.03 | 10 | did not advance | | | |
| Yadira Soturno | T53 | 400m | 1:04.80 | 9 | did not advance | | | |
| Irene Suarez | T11 | 100m | 13.20 | 8 B | —N/a | | 13.21 | 8 |
| Irene Suarez | T11 | 200m | 27.06 | 6 B | —N/a | | 27.61 | 6 |
| Alberlis Torres | T11 | 100m | 13.09 | 4 q | —N/a | | 13.08 | 4 |
| Alberlis Torres | T11 | 200m | DSQ | | did not advance | | | |

=== Cycling ===
==== Men's road ====
| Athlete | Event | Time | Rank |
|---|---|---|---|
| Victor Garrido | Men's road race LC3/LC4/CP3 | 1:39:15 | 12 |
| Cirio Molina | Men's road race LC3/LC4/CP3 | 1:39:15 | 16 |
| Cirio Molina | Men's road time trial LC3 | 40:02.48 | 8 |

==== Men's track ====
| Athlete | Event | Qualification | | 1st round | | Final | |
| Athlete | Event | Time | Rank | Time | Rank | Opposition Time | Rank |
|---|---|---|---|---|---|---|---|
| Victor Garrido | Men's time trial LC3-4 | —N/a | | | | 1:27.1 | 16 |

=== Judo ===
==== Men ====
| Athlete | Event | First Round | Quarterfinals | Semifinals | Repechage round 1 | Repechage round 2 | Final/ Bronze medal contest |
| Athlete | Event | Opposition Result | Opposition Result | Opposition Result | Opposition Result | Opposition Result | Opposition Result |
|---|---|---|---|---|---|---|---|
| Reinaldo Carvallo | Men's 81kg | Pominov (UKR); W 0210–0000 | Ardit (ITA); W 0011–0000 | Jonard (FRA); L 0000–1010 | —N/a | | Oga (JPN); W 1010-0000 (bronze) |
| Marcos Falcon | Men's 66kg | V Sanchez (CUB); L 0000–1102 | —N/a | | Harris (GBR); W 0120–0001 | Kallunki (FIN); L 0000–1000 | Did not advance |

==== Women ====
| Athlete | Event | First Round | Quarterfinals | Semifinals | Repechage round 1 | Repechage round 2 | Final/ Bronze medal contest |
| Athlete | Event | Opposition Result | Opposition Result | Opposition Result | Opposition Result | Opposition Result | Opposition Result |
|---|---|---|---|---|---|---|---|
| Naomi Soazo | Women's 63kg | Bye | Zhou Q (CHN); W 1000–0001 | Kivi (SWE); W 0240–0120 | —N/a | | Arce (ESP); W 1000-0000 (gold) |

=== Powerlifting ===
| Athlete | Event | Result | Rank |
|---|---|---|---|
| Jose Chirinos | Men's 90kg | 175.0 | 7 |
| Nairobys Hernandez | Women's 44kg | NMR | |

=== Swimming ===
==== Men ====
| Athlete | Class | Event | Heats | | Final | |
| Athlete | Class | Event | Result | Rank | Result | Rank |
|---|---|---|---|---|---|---|
| Pedro Gonzalez | S12 | 50m freestyle | 27.79 | 15 | did not advance | |
| Pedro Gonzalez | S12 | 100m butterfly | 1:12.80 | 11 | did not advance | |
| Pedro Gonzalez | SB12 | 100m breaststroke | 1:25.96 | 11 | did not advance | |

==== Women ====
| Athlete | Class | Event | Heats | | Final | |
| Athlete | Class | Event | Result | Rank | Result | Rank |
|---|---|---|---|---|---|---|
| Belkys Mota | S12 | 50m freestyle | 30.28 | 8 Q | 30.43 | 8 |
| Belkys Mota | S12 | 100m freestyle | 1:07.11 | 8 Q | 1:07.35 | 7 |
| Belkys Mota | S12 | 100m butterfly | 1:13.95 | 4 Q | 1:12.49 | 5 |
| Belkys Mota | SM12 | 200m individual medley | 2:52.44 | 10 | did not advance | |
| Valentina Rangel | SM12 | 200m individual medley | 3:23.63 | 12 | did not advance | |

=== Table tennis ===
| Athlete | Event | Preliminaries | | | Quarterfinals | Semifinals | Final / BM | |
| Athlete | Event | Opposition Result | Opposition Result | Rank | Opposition Result | Opposition Result | Opposition Result | Rank |
|---|---|---|---|---|---|---|---|---|
| Roberto Quijada | Men's singles C3 | Robin (FRA); L 0–3 | Kosco (SVK); L 0–3 | 3 | did not advance | | | |

== See also ==
- Venezuela at the Paralympics
- Venezuela at the 2008 Summer Olympics
