= Judo at the 2012 Summer Paralympics – Women's 63 kg =

Judo – Women's 63 kg at the XIV Paralympic Games
- Venue: ExCeL London
- Date: 31 August 2012
- Competitors: 8 from 8 nations

Medalists
1st place, gold medalist(s)		Dalidaivis Rodriguez Clark	Cuba
2nd place, silver medalist(s)		Zhou Tong	China
3rd place, bronze medalist(s)		Daniele Bernardes Milan	Brazil
3rd place, bronze medalist(s)		Marta Arce Payno	Spain

The women's 63 kg judo competition at the 2012 Summer Paralympics was held on 31 August at the ExCeL London convention center in London, United Kingdom.

== Results ==
Quarterfinals
Nicolina Pernheim (SWE)	000
Marta Arce Payno (ESP)	021
Naomi Soazo (VEN)	0101
Dalidaivis Rodriguez Clark (CUB)	1101
Paivi Tolppanen (FIN)	000
Daniele Bernardes Milan (BRA)	100
Zhou Tong (CHN)	020
Serife Koseoglu (TUR)	000

Semifinals
Marta Arce Payno (ESP)	010
Dalidaivis Rodriguez Clark (CUB)	100
Daniele Bernardes Milan (BRA)	0001
Zhou Tong (CHN)	0021

Final
Dalidaivis Rodriguez Clark (CUB)	100
Zhou Tong (CHN)	000

=== Repechage ===
Repechage
Nicolina Pernheim (SWE)	000
Naomi Soazo (VEN)	110
Paivi Tolppanen (FIN)	100
Serife Koseoglu (TUR)	000

Bronze medal finals
Naomi Soazo (VEN)	001
Daniele Bernardes Milan (BRA)	100
Paivi Tolppanen (FIN)	010
Marta Arce Payno (ESP)	100

== See also ==
- Japanese Martial Arts
- Olympic Games
- Paralympic Games
