= Judo at the 2008 Summer Paralympics – Men's 66 kg =

Judo competition

Judo - Men's 66 kg at the XIII Paralympic Games
- Venue: Beijing Workers' Gymnasium
- Date: September 7, 2008
- Competitors: 12 from 12 nations

Medalists
1st place, gold medalist(s)		Sid Ali Lamri	Algeria
2nd place, silver medalist(s)		Satoshi Fujimoto	Japan
3rd place, bronze medalist(s)		Jani Kallunki	Finland
3rd place, bronze medalist(s)		Victor Sanchez	Cuba

The Men's 66 kg judo competition at the 2008 Summer Paralympics was held on September 7 at the Beijing Workers' Gymnasium.

This event was the second-lightest of the men's judo weight classes, limiting competitors to a maximum of 66 kilograms of body mass. Like all other judo events, bouts lasted five minutes. If the bout was still tied at the end, it was extended for another five-minute, sudden-death period; if neither judoka scored during that period, the match is decided by the judges. The tournament bracket consisted of a single-elimination contest culminating in a gold medal match. There was also a repechage to determine the winners of the two bronze medals. Each judoka who had lost to a semifinalist competed in the repechage. The two judokas who lost in the semifinals faced the winner of the opposite half of the bracket's repechage in bronze medal bouts.

== Final ranking ==
Rank	Name
Gold medal	Sid Ali Lamri (ALG)
Silver medal	Satoshi Fujimoto (JPN)
Bronze medal	Jani Kallunki (FIN)
Bronze medal	Victor Sanchez (CUB)
5	Reza Golmohammadi (IRI)
5	Sergii Karpeniuk (UKR)
7	Marcos Falcon (VEN)
7	Ilkin Alishov (AZE)

== Tournament results ==
First Round
Victor Sanchez (CUB)	1102
Marcos Falcon (VEN)	0000
Kevin Villemont (FRA)	0000
Jani Kallunki (FIN)	1010
Reza Golmohammadi (IRI)	1000
David Garcia (ESP)	0000
Ilkin Alishov (AZE)	0001
Eduardo Amaral (BRA)	0000^{1}

Quarterfinals
Darren Harris (GBR)	0000
Victor Sanchez (CUB)	1001
Jani Kallunki (FIN)	0000^{1}
Satoshi Fujimoto (JPN)	0101
Reza Golmohammadi (IRI)	0010^{1}
Sergii Karpeniuk (UKR)	0003
Sid Ali Lamri (ALG)	0010^{1}
Ilkin Alishov (AZE)	0001^{2}

Semifinals
Victor Sanchez (CUB)
Satoshi Fujimoto (JPN)	Hantei (decision)
Reza Golmohammadi (IRI)	0000
Sid Ali Lamri (ALG)	1001

Final
Satoshi Fujimoto (JPN)	0000
Sid Ali Lamri (ALG)	0100

=== Repechage ===
First round
Marcos Falcon (VEN)	0120^{1}
Darren Harris (GBR)	0001
Jani Kallunki (FIN)
Bye
David Garcia (ESP)	Kiken-Gachi (forfeit)
Sergii Karpeniuk (UKR)
Ilkin Alishov (AZE)
Bye

Second round
Marcos Falcon (VEN)	0000
Jani Kallunki (FIN)	1000
Sergii Karpeniuk (UKR)	0101
Ilkin Alishov (AZE)	0000^{1}

Bronze medal finals
Jani Kallunki (FIN)	1000
Reza Golmohammadi (IRI)	0000
Sergii Karpeniuk (UKR)	0000^{3}
Victor Sanchez (CUB)	0120
