= Venezuela at the 2016 Summer Paralympics =

- IPC code: VEN
- NPC: Comité Paralimpico Venezolano

in Rio de Janeiro
- Competitors: 24 in 6 sports
- Flag bearer: Sol Rojas
- Medals Ranked 65th: Gold 0 Silver 3 Bronze 3 Total 6

Summer Paralympics appearances (overview)
- 1984; 1988; 1992; 1996; 2000; 2004; 2008; 2012; 2016; 2020; 2024

Venezuela competed at the 2016 Summer Paralympics in Rio de Janeiro, Brazil, from 7 to 18 September 2016.

== Medalists ==
Medal	Name	Sport	Event	Date
Silver	Luis Paiva	Athletics	Men's 400 m T20	9 September
Silver	Omar Monterola	Athletics	Men's 400 m T37	16 September
Silver	Sol Rojas	Athletics	Women's 400 m T11	16 September
Bronze	Yescarly Medina	Athletics	Women's 100 metres T37	9 September
Bronze	Naomi Soazo	Judo	Women's 70 kg	10 September
Bronze	Rafael Uribe	Athletics	Men's high jump T44	12 September

Medals by sport
Sport	1st place, gold medalist(s)	2nd place, silver medalist(s)	3rd place, bronze medalist(s)	Total
Athletics	0	3	2	5
Judo	0	0	1	1
Total	0	3	3	6

== Disability classifications ==
Every participant at the Paralympics has their disability grouped into one of five disability categories; amputation, the condition may be congenital or sustained through injury or illness; cerebral palsy; wheelchair athletes, there is often overlap between this and other categories; visual impairment, including blindness; Les autres, any physical disability that does not fall strictly under one of the other categories, for example dwarfism or multiple sclerosis. Each Paralympic sport then has its own classifications, dependent upon the specific physical demands of competition. Events are given a code, made of numbers and letters, describing the type of event and classification of the athletes competing. Some sports, such as athletics, divide athletes by both the category and severity of their disabilities, other sports, for example swimming, group competitors from different categories together, the only separation being based on the severity of the disability.

== Athletics ==
Men

Athlete	Event	Round 1		Heat		Final	
Athlete	Event	Result	Rank	Result	Rank	Result	Rank
Fernando Ferrer	Men's 100 m T11	11.70	3 Q	11.67	3	Did not advance	
Fernando Ferrer	Men's 200 m T11	24.21	3	Did not advance			
Omar Monterola	Men's 100 m T37	—N/a		11.86	3 Q	12.13	8
Omar Monterola	Men's 400 m T37	—N/a		53.38	1 Q	52.93	2nd place, silver medalist(s)
Samuel Colmenares	Men's 400 m T45/46/47	—N/a		50.22	3 Q	49.55	5
Luis Paiva	Men's 400 m T20	—N/a		48.43	1 Q	47.83	2nd place, silver medalist(s)
Luis Paiva	Men's 1500 m T20	—N/a				4:11:20	8
Edixon Pirela	Men's 400 m T20	—N/a		DSQ		Did not advance	
Rafael Uribe	Men's high jump T44	—N/a				2.01	3rd place, bronze medalist(s)
Lo Andris González	Men's high jump T45/46/47	—N/a				1.85	7
Abrahan Ortega	Men's javelin F46	—N/a				49.94	8

Women

Athlete	Event	Round 1		Heat		Final	
Athlete	Event	Result	Rank	Result	Rank	Result	Rank
Sol Rojas	Women's 200 m T11	25.81	3 Q	25.47	2	Did not advance	
Sol Rojas	Women's 400 m T11	—N/a		56.83	2 Q	57.64	2nd place, silver medalist(s)
Greilyz Villarroel	Women's 100 m T12	12.45	2 Q	12.60	3	Did not advance	
Greilyz Villarroel	Women's 200 m T12	—N/a		25.88	3	Did not advance	
Greilyz Villarroel	Women's 400 m T12	—N/a		59.71	3	Did not advance	
Yescarly Medina	Women's 100 m T37	—N/a		14.11	2 Q	13.85	3rd place, bronze medalist(s)
Norkelys González	Women's 400 m T20	—N/a		1:01:18	4	Did not advance	
Norkelys González	Women's long jump T20	—N/a				4.90	6
Yomaira Cohen	Women's shot put T37	—N/a				9.54	6
Yomaira Cohen	Women's shot put T37/38	—N/a					
Yomaira Cohen	Women's javelin T37	—N/a				28.56	4

== Cycling ==
With one pathway for qualification being one highest ranked NPCs on the UCI Para-Cycling male and female Nations Ranking Lists on 31 December 2014, Venezuela qualified for the 2016 Summer Paralympics in Rio, assuming they continued to meet all other eligibility requirements.

Men

=== Road ===
Athlete	Event	Time	Rank
Cirio Molina	Men's road race C1-3	1:58:19	20
Cirio Molina	Men's time trial C2	29:13:40	8
Victor Garrido	Men's road race C1-3	DNF	

== Judo ==
Men

Athlete	Event	Quarterfinals	Semifinals	Repechage	Bronze medal	Final	
Athlete	Event	Opposition Result	Opposition Result	Opposition Result	Opposition Result	Opposition Result	Rank
Marcos Falcón	Men's 66 kg	Bareikis (LTU); L 0–0	Did not advance				9
Mauricio Briceño	Men's 73 kg	Nascimento de Oliveira (BRA); W 100–0	Kornhass (GER); L 0–0	Rodríguez (CUB); L 100–0	Did not advance		7
William Montero	Men's +100 kg	Nadri (IRI); L 0–101	Did not advance				

Women

Athlete	Event	Quarterfinals	Semifinals	Bronze medal	Final	
Athlete	Event	Opposition Result	Opposition Result	Opposition Result	Opposition Result	Rank
Naomi Soazo	Women's 70 kg	Zhou (CHN); W 100–0	Ruvalcaba (MEX); L 11-100	Breskovic (CRO); W 002–001	Did not advance	3rd place, bronze medalist(s)

== Powerlifting ==
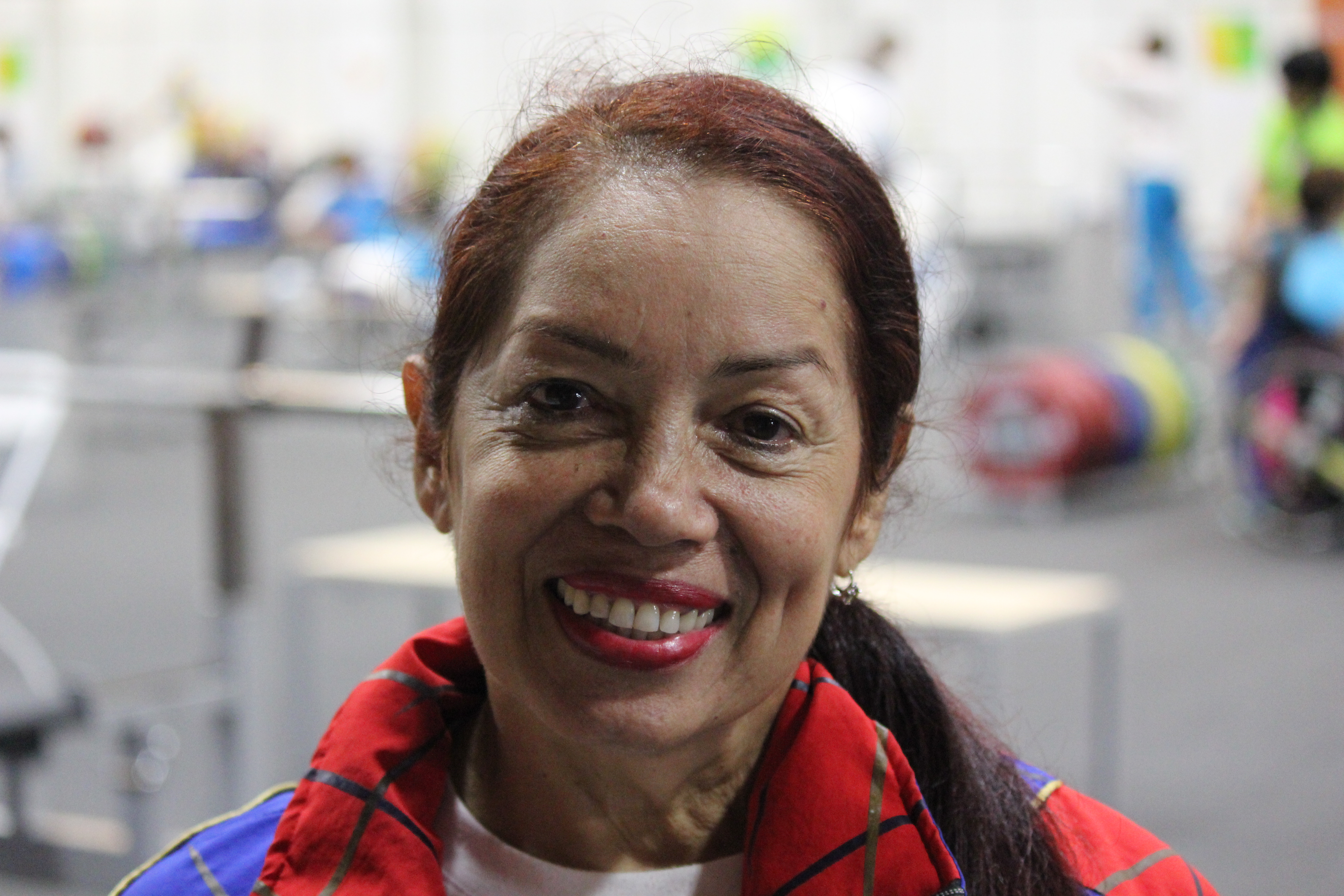
62 year old Venezuelan powerlifter Zuray Marcano at the Rio Games

Athlete	Event	Total lifted	Rank
Zuray Marcano	Women's –50 kg	63	8

== Swimming ==
Men

Athlete	Event	Heat		Final	
Athlete	Event	Result	Rank	Result	Rank
Alberto Vera	100 m breaststroke SB14	1:15:91	14	Did not advance	
Alberto Vera	200 m medley SM14	2:35:14	20	Did not advance	

Women

Athlete	Event	Heat		Final	
Athlete	Event	Result	Rank	Result	Rank
Belkis Mota	50 m freestyle S12	30.50	7 Q	30.47	6
Belkis Mota	400 m freestyle S13	5:09:57	12	Did not advance	
Belkis Mota	100 m butterfly S13	1:15:60	15	Did not advance	

== Table tennis ==
Men

Athlete	Event	Group			Quarterfinals	Semifinals	Final	Rank
Athlete	Event	Opposition Result	Opposition Result	Rank	Opposition Result	Opposition Result	Opposition Result	Rank
Edson Gómez	Singles class 4	Turan (TUR); L 0–3	Saleh (EGY); L 2–3	3	Did not advance			15
Denisos Martínez	Singles class 11	Palos (HUN); L 0–3	Pereira Leal (FRA)	3	Did not advance			11

== See also ==
- Venezuela at the 2016 Summer Olympics
