= Judo at the 2012 Summer Paralympics – Men's 66 kg =

Judo competition

Judo – Men's 66 kg at the XIV Paralympic Games
- Venue: ExCeL London
- Date: 30 August 2012
- Competitors: 8 from 8 nations

Medalists
1st place, gold medalist(s)		Davyd Khorava	Ukraine
2nd place, silver medalist(s)		Zhao Xu	China
3rd place, bronze medalist(s)		Sid Ali Lamri	Algeria
3rd place, bronze medalist(s)		Marcos Falcón	Venezuela

The men's 66 kg judo competition at the 2012 Summer Paralympics was held on 30 August at ExCeL London.

== Results ==
Quarterfinals
Zhao Xu (CHN)	001
Bayram Mustafayev (AZE)	0002
Makoto Hirose (JPN)	001
Sid Ali Lamri (ALG)	0001
David García del Valle (ESP)	011
Marcos Falcón (VEN)	0012
Davyd Khorava (UKR)
Jani Kallunki (FIN)	DNS

Semifinals
Zhao Xu (CHN)	100
Makoto Hirose (JPN)	000
David García del Valle (ESP)	000
Davyd Khorava (UKR)	100

Final
Zhao Xu (CHN)	000
Davyd Khorava (UKR)	100

=== Repechage ===
Repechage
Bayram Mustafayev (AZE)	0002
Sid Ali Lamri (ALG)	1021
Marcos Falcón (VEN)	BYE

Bronze medal finals
Sid Ali Lamri (ALG)	100
David García del Valle (ESP)	000
Marcos Falcón (VEN)	0102
Makoto Hirose (JPN)	0023
