= Judo at the 2004 Summer Paralympics – Men's 66 kg =

Judo competition

Judo - Men's up to 66 kg at the XII Paralympic Games
- Paralympic Judo
- Venue: Ano Liossia Olympic Hall
- Dates: 18 September 2004
- Competitors: 13 from 13 nations

Medalists
1st place, gold medalist(s)		Satoshi Fujimoto	Japan
2nd place, silver medalist(s)		David Garcia del Valle	Spain
3rd place, bronze medalist(s)		Jani Kallunki	Finland
3rd place, bronze medalist(s)		Xu Zhi Lin	China

The Men's up to 66 kg judo competition at the 2004 Summer Paralympics was held on 18 September at the Ano Liossia Olympic Hall.

The tournament bracket consisted of a single-elimination contest culminating in a gold medal match. There was also a repechage to determine the winners of the two bronze medals. Each judoka who had lost to a semifinalist competed in the repechage. The two judokas who lost in the semifinals faced the winner of the opposite half of the bracket's repechage in bronze medal bouts.

The event was won by Satoshi Fujimoto, representing Japan.

== Results ==
The four digits represent scores of ippon, waza-ari, yuko and koka (which was still used at the time). A letter indicates a penalty of shido, chui, keikoku or hansoku make, which (at the time) also registered a score of koka, yuko, waza-ari or ippon, respectively, to the opponent. Penalties are escalated, thus 2 shido = chui, 3 shido = keikoku, 4 shido = hansoku make, save that a penalty of hansoku make direct results in exclusion from the remainder of the competition, while if it results from escalation it does not.

=== Competition bracket ===
Round of 16
Jani Kallunki (FIN)	1000
Sidali Lamri (ALG)	0000
Satoshi Fujimoto (JPN)	0051
Darren Kail (GBR)	0000
Xu Zhi Lin (CHN)	0013
Lee Ching Cheng (TPE)	0120S
Efstathios Soutios (GRE)	0000
David Garcia del Valle (ESP)	1010
Sergiy Karpenyuk (UKR)	0102H
Lee Jong Dae (KOR)	1000

Quarterfinals
Jani Kallunki (FIN)	0002C
Oleg Shabashov (RUS)	0020S
Satoshi Fujimoto (JPN)	1000
Alfredo Viera (URU)	0000
Emmanuel Brannon (USA)	0000
Lee Ching Cheng (TPE)	1000
David Garcia del Valle (ESP)	0200C
Lee Jong Dae (KOR)	0010K

Semifinals
Oleg Shabashov (RUS)	0000
Satoshi Fujimoto (JPN)	1010
Lee Ching Cheng (TPE)	0000
David Garcia del Valle (ESP)	0200

Final
Satoshi Fujimoto (JPN)	0010
David Garcia del Valle (ESP)	0000

=== Repechage ===
First round
Alfredo Viera (URU)	0000
Darren Kail (GBR)	0200
Xu Zhi Lin (CHN)	1112
Emmanuel Brannon (USA)	0000S
Lee Jong Dae (KOR)	1001S
Efstathios Soutios (GRE)	0000S

Second round
Jani Kallunki (FIN)	1000
Darren Kail (GBR)	0001
Xu Zhi Lin (CHN)	0031
Lee Jong Dae (KOR)	0000

Bronze medal matches
Jani Kallunki (FIN)	1000
Lee Ching Cheng (TPE)	0000
Xu Zhi Lin (CHN)	1010
Oleg Shabashov (RUS)	0101
