= Judo at the 2016 Summer Paralympics – Men's 66 kg =

Judo competition

Judo – Men's 66 kg at the XV Paralympic Games
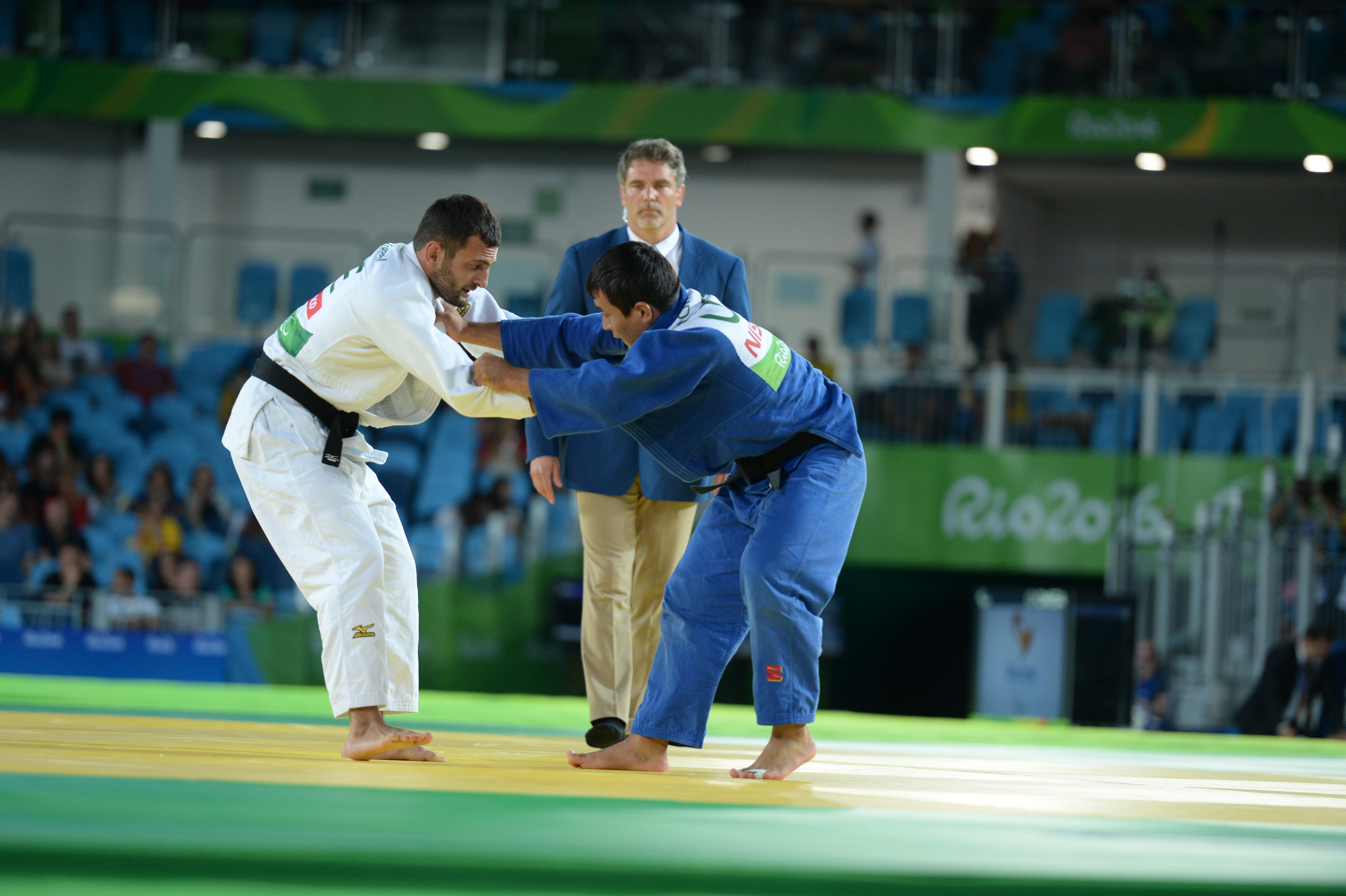
- Final between Bayram Mustafayev (Azerbaijan) and Utkirjon Nigmatov (Uzbekistan)
- Venue: Carioca Arena 3
- Date: 8 September 2016
- Competitors: 12 from 12 nations

Medalists
1st place, gold medalist(s)		Utkirjon Nigmatov	Uzbekistan
2nd place, silver medalist(s)		Bayram Mustafayev	Azerbaijan
3rd place, bronze medalist(s)		Davyd Khorava	Ukraine
3rd place, bronze medalist(s)		Satoshi Fujimoto	Japan

The men's 66 kg judo competition at the 2016 Summer Paralympics was held on 8 September at Carioca Arena 3.

== Results ==
Round of 16
8	Satoshi Fujimoto (JPN)	100
10	Luis Gavilan (ESP)	000
6	Miguel Vieira (POR)	000
7	Halyson Oliveira Boto (BRA)	100
5	Marcos Falcón (VEN)	000^{2}
12	Osvaldas Bareikis (LTU)	000^{1}
11	Munkhbat Aajim (MGL)	000
9	Luis Pérez Díaz (PUR)	100

Quarterfinals
1	Park Jongseok (KOR)	0
8	Satoshi Fujimoto (JPN)	110
4	Bayram Mustafayev (AZE)	010
6	Halyson Oliveira Boto (BRA)	000
2	Davyd Khorava (UKR)	100
12	Osvaldas Bareikis (LTU)	0
3	Utkirjon Nigmatov (UZB)	010
9	Luis Pérez Díaz (PUR)	000

Semifinals
8	Satoshi Fujimoto (JPN)	0
4	Bayram Mustafayev (AZE)	100
2	Davyd Khorava (UKR)	000
3	Utkirjon Nigmatov (UZB)	100

Final
1	Bayram Mustafayev (AZE)	0
3	Utkirjon Nigmatov (UZB)	110

=== Repechage ===
Repechage Round 1
Luis Gavilan (ESP)	000
Park Jongseok (KOR)	100

Repechage Finals
Park Jongseok (KOR)	100
Halyson Oliveira Boto (BRA)	000
Osvaldas Bareikis (LTU)	001
Luis Pérez Díaz (PUR)	000^{2}

Bronze Medal Matches
Park Jongseok (KOR)	000
Davyd Khorava (UKR)	111
Osvaldas Bareikis (LTU)	000^{3}
Satoshi Fujimoto (JPN)	000
