= Judo at the 2000 Summer Paralympics – Men's 66 kg =

Paralympic judo event

Men's 66kg at the XI Paralympic Games
- Competitors: 12 from 12 nations

Medalists
1st place, gold medalist(s)		Satoshi Fujimoto	Japan
2nd place, silver medalist(s)		David Garcia del Valle	Spain
3rd place, bronze medalist(s)		Oleg Chabachov	Russia
3rd place, bronze medalist(s)		Marlon Lopez	United States

The men's -66kg judo event at the 2000 Summer Paralympics.

== Main round ==
Round of 16
Marlon Lopez (USA)	0000S
Oleg Chabachov (RUS)	1001
Sebastian Junk (GER)	1001S
Sangjun Yabchaleaw (THA)	0011S
Satoshi Fujimoto (JPN)	1122
Sergiy Sydorenko (UKR)	0000
Darren Kail (GBR)	0000
Alessandro Oliveira (BRA)	0201

Quarterfinals
Timothy Culhane (IRL)	0001
Oleg Chabachov (RUS)	0200C
Sebastian Junk (GER)	0000
David Garcia del Valle (ESP)	1010
Satoshi Fujimoto (JPN)	0011S
Cyril More (FRA)	0001C
Alessandro Oliveira (BRA)	1020S
Lee Jong Dae (KOR)	0001

Semifinals
Oleg Chabachov (RUS)	0001H
David Garcia del Valle (ESP)	1000S
Satoshi Fujimoto (JPN)	1000
Alessandro Oliveira (BRA)	89

Final
David Garcia del Valle (ESP)	0010
Satoshi Fujimoto (JPN)	0111C

== Repechage ==
First round
Marlon Lopez (USA)	1000
Timothy Culhane (IRL)	0000
Sergiy Sydorenko (UKR)	1100
Cyril More (FRA)	0000
Darren Kail (GBR)	0200S
Lee Jong Dae (KOR)	0001

Second round
Marlon Lopez (USA)	1021
Sebastian Junk (GER)	0000S
Sergiy Sydorenko (UKR)	0110
Darren Kail (GBR)	0000

Bronze medal matches
Marlon Lopez (USA)	1000
Alessandro Oliveira (BRA)	0000
Sergiy Sydorenko (UKR)	0000
Oleg Chabachov (RUS)	1010
