= Venezuela at the 2020 Summer Paralympics =

- IPC code: VEN
- NPC: Comité Paralimpico Venezolano

in Tokyo
- Competitors: 8 in 4 sports
- Flag bearers: Lisbeli Vera Andrade & Abraham Ortega
- Medals Ranked 38th: Gold 3 Silver 2 Bronze 2 Total 7

Summer Paralympics appearances (overview)
- 1984; 1988; 1992; 1996; 2000; 2004; 2008; 2012; 2016; 2020; 2024

Venezuela competed at the 2020 Summer Paralympics in Tokyo, Japan, from 24 August to 5 September 2021.

== Medalists ==
Medal	Name	Sport	Event	Date
Gold	Linda Patricia Perez Lopez Guide: Alvaro Cassiani	Athletics	Women's 100 metres T11	31 August
Gold	Lisbeli Vera Andrade	Athletics	Women's 100 metres T47	31 August
Gold	Lisbeli Vera Andrade	Athletics	Women's 200 metres T47	4 September
Silver	Lisbeli Vera Andrade	Athletics	Women's 400 metres T47	28 August
Silver	Luis Felipe Rodriguez Bolivar	Athletics	Men's 400 metres T20	31 August
Bronze	Clara Fuentes Monasterio	Powerlifting	Women's 41 kg	26 August
Bronze	Alejandra Paola Perez Lopez	Athletics	Women's 400 metres T12	31 August

== Athletics ==
Five Venezuela athlete (Luis Felipe Rodriguez Bolivar, Edwars Alexander Varela Mesa, Lisbeli Marina Vera Andrade, Greilyz G. Villarroel Hernandez & Naibys Daniela Morillo Gil successfully to break through the qualifications for the 2020 Paralympics after breaking the qualification limit.

DQ: Disqualified | SB: Season Best | Q: Qualified by place or standard based on overall position after heats | DNM: Did not mark | DNA: Did not advance | N/A: Not available, stage was not contested | PB: Personal Best | WR: World Record | PR: Paralympic Record | AR: Area Record

Men's track

Athlete	Event	Heats		Final	
Athlete	Event	Result	Rank	Result	Rank
Edixon Pirela	Men's 400m T20	50.59	6	DNA	11
Luis Felipe Rodriguez	Men's 400m T20	48.72	1 Q	47.71 SB	Silver medal
Enderson Santos Guide: Eubrig Maza	Men's 400m T11	DNS			

Men's field

Athlete	Event	Final	
Athlete	Event	Result	Rank
Abraham Ortega	Men's shot put F46	14.36	8
Rafael Uribe Pimentel	Men's high jump T64	DNM	7
Bryan Enríquez	Men's discus throw F37	46.57 SB	6

Women's track

Athlete	Event	Heats		Semi-Final		Final	
Athlete	Event	Result	Rank	Result	Rank	Result	Rank
Norkelys Gonzalez	Women's 400m T20	59.49 SB	3 Q	N/A		59.74	6
Alejandra Pérez López Guide: Markinzon Manzanilla	Women's 100m T12	DQ					
Alejandra Pérez López Guide: Markinzon Manzanilla	Women's 200m T12	25.32 PB	2 q	N/A		25.27 PB	4
Alejandra Pérez López Guide: Markinzon Manzanilla	Women's 400m T12	56.95 PB	1 Q	N/A		57.06	Bronze medal
Linda Patricia Perez LopezGuide: Alvaro Cassiani	Women's 100m T11	12.42 PB	2 q	12.29 PB	1 Q	12.05 PB	Gold medal
Linda Patricia Perez LopezGuide: Alvaro Cassiani	Women's 200m T11	25.87 PB	1 Q	25.41 PB	2 q	25.27 PB	4
Linda Patricia Perez LopezGuide: Alvaro Cassiani	Women's 400m T11	59.60 PB	1 Q	58.99 PB	2 q	57.71 PB	4
Greilyz Villaroel Guide: Edicson Medina	Women's 100m T12	12.57 PB	2 q	12.68	3	DNA	5
Greilyz Villaroel Guide: Edicson Medina	Women's 200m T12	25.86 SB	2	25.41 PB	2 q	25.27 PB	4
Greilyz Villaroel Guide: Edicson Medina	Women's 400m T12	59.60 PB	1 Q	58.99 PB	2 q	57.71 PB	4
Sol Rojas Guide: Aris Antunez	Women's 200m T11	26.05 PB	2	N/A		DNA	6
Sol Rojas Guide: Aris Antunez	Women's 400m T11	58.71 SB	2 q	N/A		57.69 PB	4
Lisbeli Vera Andrade	Women's 100m T47	12.14 PB	1 Q	N/A		11.97 PB	Gold medal
Lisbeli Vera Andrade	Women's 200m T47	24.53 PB	1 Q	N/A		24.52 PB	Gold medal
Lisbeli Vera Andrade	Women's 400m T47	57.58 PB	1 Q	N/A		57.32 PB	Silver medal

Women's field

Athlete	Event	Final	
Athlete	Event	Result	Rank
Yomaira Cohen	Women's shot put F37	10.16 SB	6
Paola García	Women's long jump T47	4.68	12
Wendis Mejía	Women's shot put F34	6.62 SB	8
Wendis Mejía	Women's javelin throw F34	15.90 AR, PB	5
Naibys Morillo	Women's javelin throw F46	38.33	4

== Cycling ==
Venezuela sent one male cyclist after successfully getting a slot in the 2018 UCI Nations Ranking Allocation quota for the Americas.

Athlete	Event	Time	Rank
Henry Raabe	Road race C1-2-3	LAP	34
Henry Raabe	Time trial C3	44:23.24	12
Victor Garrido	3000m Individual Pursuit C2	4:30.602	10
Victor Garrido	1000m Time trial C1-3	1:27.534	21

== Judo ==
Athlete	Event	Preliminaries	Quarterfinals	Semifinals	Repechage First round	Repechage Final	Final / BM	
Athlete	Event	Opposition Result	Opposition Result	Opposition Result	Opposition Result	Opposition Result	Opposition Result	Rank
Dennis Blanco	Men's −60 kg	Ouldkouider (ALG) W 1s1-0s1	Namozov (UZB) W 1s1-0	Sariyev (KAZ) L 00-10	BYE		Çiftçi (TUR)L 00–10IPP	5
Héctor Espinoza	Men's −90 kg	Cavalcante (BRA)L DNS–10IPP	Did Not Advance					

== Powerlifting ==
DNM: Did not mark

Athlete	Event	Total lifted	Rank
Clara Fuentes	Women's -41 kg	97	Bronze medal
Wiunawis Hernández	Women's -55 kg	97	8
Oriana Terán	Women's -45 kg	73	7

== Swimming ==
One Venezuela swimmer has successfully entered the paralympic slot after breaking the MQS.

Athlete	Event	Heats		Final	
Athlete	Event	Time	Rank	Time	Rank
Ericsson Bermudez	Men's 100m breaststroke SB7	N/A		1:27.83	6
José Montilla Vera	Men's 50m breaststroke SB2	DNS			
Belkis Mota	Women's 100m freestyle S12	1:07.53	4 Q	1:07.60	7
Belkis Mota	Women's 100m breaststroke SB12	N/A		1:30.37	6

== Table tennis ==
Venezuela entered one athletes into the table tennis competition at the games. Denisos Martinez qualified from 2019 Parapan American Games which was held in Lima, Peru.

Men

Athlete	Event	Group Stage			Round 1	Quarterfinals	Semifinals	Final	
Athlete	Event	Opposition Result	Opposition Result	Rank	Opposition Result	Opposition Result	Opposition Result	Opposition Result	Rank
Denisos Martinez	Individual C11	Van Acker (BEL)L 0-3	Takeshi Takemori (JPN)L 0–3	3	Did Not Advance				
