= Venezuela at the 2024 Summer Paralympics =

- Flag of Venezuela
- IPC code: VEN
- NPC: Comité Paralimpico Venezolano

in Paris, France August 28, 2024 – September 8, 2024
- Competitors: 25 (7 men and 18 women) in 9 sports
- Flag bearers: Luis Felipe Rodríguez Bolívar; Lisbeli Marina Vera Andrade
- Medals Ranked 34th: Gold 3 Silver 2 Bronze 1 Total 6

Summer Paralympics appearances (overview)
- 1984; 1988; 1992; 1996; 2000; 2004; 2008; 2012; 2016; 2020; 2024

Venezuela competed at the 2024 Summer Paralympics in Paris, France, from 28 August to 8 September.

== Competitors ==
The following is the list of number of competitors in the Games.

Sport	Men	Women	Total
Athletics	4	11	15
Cycling	1	0	1
Judo	1	1	2
Paratriathlon	0	1	1
Powerlifting	0	1	1
Swimming	1	1	2
Table tennis	0	1	1
Taekwondo	0	1	1
Wheelchair fencing	0	1	1
Total	7	18	25

== Athletics ==
Venezuelan track and field athletes achieved quota places for the following events based on their results at the 2023 World Championships, 2024 World Championships, or through high performance allocation, as long as they meet the minimum entry standard (MES).

Key

- Note–Ranks given for track events are within the athlete's heat only
- Q = Qualified for the next round
- q = Qualified for the next round as a fastest loser or, in field events, by position without achieving the qualifying target
- DQ = Disqualified
- PR = Paralympic Record
- AR = Area (or continental) Record
- NR = National Record
- SB = Season's Best
- N/A = Round not applicable for the event
- Bye = Athlete not required to compete in round

Track & road events

Athlete	Event	Heat		Semifinal		Final	
Athlete	Event	Result	Rank	Result	Rank	Result	Rank
Enderson German Santos Gonzalez	Men's 100 m T11	11.32	6 q	11.27	5 q	Did not advance	
Enderson German Santos Gonzalez	Men's 400 m T11	51.51	1 Q	51.71	2 q	50.58	1st place, gold medalist(s)
Luis Felipe Rodríguez Bolívar	Men's 400 m T20	51.51	2 q	51.71	3 q	50.58	1st place, gold medalist(s)
Luis Daniel Lopez Morales	Men's 400 m T47	49.67	9	Did not advance			
Linda Pérez	Women's 100 m T11	12.24	2 q	12.19	3 q	12.27	4
Linda Pérez	Women's 200 m T11	25.42	4	Bye		25.44	4
Irene Alejandra Suarez Delgado	Women's 400 m T11	1:08.25	2	Did not advance			
Irene Alejandra Suarez Delgado	Women's 1500 m T11	5:07.13	4	Did not advance			
Alejandra Pérez	Women's 100 m T12	12.24	2 q	56.34	2	Did not advance	
Alejandra Pérez	Women's 200 m T12	25.94	8 q	24.59	1 q	24.19	2nd place, silver medalist(s)
Alejandra Pérez	Women's 400 m T12	56.97	1 Q	56.34	2 q	56.64	4
Leonela Coromoto Vera Colina	Women's 400 m T20	56.41	4 q	Bye		57.18	5
Lisbeli Vera Andrade	Women's 100 m T47	11.99	1 q	Bye		DNF	-
Lisbeli Vera Andrade	Women's 200 m T47	DNS	-	Did not advance			
Lisbeli Vera Andrade	Women's 400 m T47	58.22	1 Q	—		56.78	2nd place, silver medalist(s)
Sele Barrios	Women's 1500 m T20	Withdrew					

Field events

Athlete	Event	Final	
Athlete	Event	Distance	Position
Edwars Alexander Varela Meza	Men's discus throw F37	50.89	5
Rosibel Colmenares	Women's long jump T11	3.90	9
Franyeli Nataly Vargas Ruiz	Women's long jump T11	4.18	7
Paola del Valle Garcia Ramos	Women's long jump T47	5.56	5
Yomaira Cohen	Women's shot put F37	10.67	6
Yomaira Cohen	Women's discus throw F38	24.27	13
Naibys Daniela Morillo Gil	Women's javelin throw F46	43.77	1st place, gold medalist(s)

== Cycling ==
Venezuela entered two para-cyclists (one in each gender) after finished the top eligible nation's at the 2022 UCI Nation's ranking allocation ranking.

=== Road ===
Men

Athlete	Event	Time	Rank
Richard Espinoza Balza	Men's road race H3	1:53:13	9
Richard Espinoza Balza	Men's time trial H3	53:03	11

== Judo ==
Venezuela sent two judokas (one man and one woman), in each gender based on IPJF rankings.

Athlete	Event	Round of 64	Round of 32	Round of 16	Quarterfinals	Semifinals	Repechage	Final / BM	
Athlete	Event	Opposition Result	Opposition Result	Opposition Result	Opposition Result	Opposition Result	Opposition Result	Opposition Result	Rank
Marcos Dennis Blanco	Men's -60 Kg J1	Bye			Parmar (IND); L 10–00	Did not advance	Zhu (CHN); W 10–1	Junaedi (INA); W 0–10	3rd place, bronze medalist(s)
Danitza Yoccelin Sanabria Alcala	Women's +70 kg J1	—	—	—	Zoaga (BRA); L 00–10	Did not advance	Ismiyeva (AZE); L 0–10	Did not advance	

== Paratriathlon ==
For the first time ever, Venezuela send one para-triathlete, Emma JR Rodriguez received a quota based on IPTF rankings.

Women

Athlete	Class	Swim	T1	Bike				T2	Run				Time	Rank
Athlete	Class	Swim	T1	L1	L2	L3	L4	T2	L1	L2	L3	L4	Time	Rank
Emma Juaisca Rodriguez Rodriguez	Women's PTS2	16:29	2:37	10:12	10:12	10:12	10:12	1:47	6:07	6:07	6:07	6:06	1:26:08	7

== Powerlifting ==
Venezuela sent one powerlifter, Clara S. F. Monasterio received a quota based on IPLF rankings.

Athlete	Event	Attempts (kg)				Result (kg)	Rank
Athlete	Event	1	2	3	4	Result (kg)	Rank
Clara Fuentes Monasterio	Women's 50 kg	~~120~~	120	124	—	124	1st place, gold medalist(s)

== Swimming ==
Venezuela sent two para swimmers (one man and one woman), based on IPSF rankings.

Athlete	Event	Heats		Final	
Athlete	Event	Result	Rank	Result	Rank
José Montilla	Men's 50 m breaststroke SB2	1:42.15	6	Did not advance	
Belkis Mota	Women's 100 m freestyle S12	1:08.79	6	Did not advance	
Belkis Mota	Women's 100 m breaststroke SB12	1:31.59	4 Q	1:31.83	8

== Table tennis ==
Athlete	Event	Round of 32	Round of 16	Quarterfinals	Semifinals	Final / BM	
Athlete	Event	Opposition Result	Opposition Result	Opposition Result	Opposition Result	Opposition Result	Rank
Roberto Quijada	Men's individual C3	Svatos (CZE); W 3–0	Zhai (CHN); L 0–3	Did not advance			

== Taekwondo ==
Venezuela entered one athlete to compete at the Paralympics competition. Valeria Morales qualified for the games in women's under 52 kg events, by virtue of winning the gold medal in her class at the 2024 Pan American Qualification Tournament in Santo Domingo, Dominican Republic.

Athlete	Event	First round	Quarterfinals	Semifinals	Repechage 1	Repechage 2	Final / BM	
Athlete	Event	Opposition Result	Opposition Result	Opposition Result	Opposition Result	Opposition Result	Opposition Result	Rank
Valeria Morales	Women's −57 kg	Goverdhan (NEP); L 0-31	Did not advance					

== Wheelchair fencing ==
Athlete	Event	Round of 16	Quarterfinal	Semifinal	Repechage 1	Repechage 2	Repechage 3	Repechage 4	Final / BM	
Athlete	Event	Opposition Score	Opposition Score	Opposition Score	Opposition Score	Opposition Score	Opposition Score	Opposition Score	Opposition Score	Rank
Francia Jaimez Rojas	Women's épée B	Pasquino (ITA); L 2–15	Did not advance		Demaude (FRA); L 0–15	Did not advance				
Francia Jaimez Rojas	Women's foil B	Tong (HKG); L 3–15	Did not advance		Kang (CHN); L 4–15	Did not advance				
Francia Jaimez Rojas	Women's sabre B	Khetsuriani (GEO); L 2–15	Did not advance		Tong (HKG); L 6–15	Did not advance				

== See also ==
- Venezuela at the 2024 Summer Olympics
- Venezuela at the Paralympics
