= Silke Huettler =

German Paralympic judoka

Personal information
- Occupation: Judoka

Sport
- Country: Germany
- Sport: Paralympic judo

Profile at external databases
- JudoInside.com: 89768

Silke Huettler is a German Paralympic judoka. In 2004, she won the silver medal in the women's 63 kg event at the 2004 Summer Paralympics held in Athens, Greece. In the final, she lost against Madina Kazakova of Russia.
