= Yomaira Cohen =

Venezuelan Paralympic athlete

Personal information
- Full name: Yomaira De Jesus Cohen Epieyu
- Born: 25 December 1982 (age 43) Maracaibo, Venezuela

Sport
- Country: Venezuela
- Sport: Paralympic athletics
- Disability: Hemiplegia
- Disability class: F37
- Event(s): Discus throw Javelin throw Shot put
Medal record
Paralympic athletics
Representing Venezuela
Parapan American Games
| Gold medal – first place | 2023 Santiago | Shot put F35/36/37 |
| Silver medal – second place | 2011 Guadalajara | Javelin throw F37/38 |
| Silver medal – second place | 2015 Toronto | Javelin throw F37/38 |
| Silver medal – second place | 2019 Lima | Shot put F35/36/37 |
| Bronze medal – third place | 2019 Lima | Discus throw F38 |

Yomaira De Jesus Cohen Epieyu (born 25 December 1982) is a Venezuelan Paralympic athlete who competes in discus throw, javelin throw and shot put at international track and field competitions. She is a five-time Parapan American Games medalist and has competed at the 2012, 2016 and 2020 Summer Paralympics.

== Personal life ==
On Christmas Day 1982, Cohen's mother gave birth to her in a trapped elevator in a hospital in Carabobo when she was going to the maternity ward, in the place where she was born, there was not enough oxygen and Yomaira had cerebral palsy on her left hand side. Cohen is married to fellow Paralympic athlete Juan Valladares.
