= Madina Kazakova =

Russian Paralympic judoka

Personal information
- Born: 16 June 1976 (age 50)
- Occupation: Judoka

Sport
- Country: Russia
- Sport: Paralympic judo

Madina Kazakova (born 16 June 1976) is a Russian Paralympic judoka. In 2004, she won the gold medal in the women's 63 kg event at the 2004 Summer Paralympics held in Athens, Greece. In the final, she defeated Silke Huettler of Germany. In 2008, she won one of the bronze medals in the same event at the 2008 Summer Paralympics held in Beijing, China.
