= Athletics at the 2016 Summer Paralympics – Women's 400 metres T11 =

Women's 400 metres T11 at the XV Paralympic Games
- Venue: Estádio Olímpico João Havelange
- Dates: 16 September 2016
- Competitors: 11 from 7 nations

Medalists
1st place, gold medalist(s)		Cuiqing Liu	China
2nd place, silver medalist(s)		Sol Rojas	Venezuela
3rd place, bronze medalist(s)		Terezinha Guilhermina	Brazil

The T11 category is for athletes with a visual impairment. A T11 athlete may be entirely without sight, or be able to perceive light, but have no ability to see the shape of a hand at any distance. T11 athletes commonly run with guides.

The Athletics at the 2016 Summer Paralympics – Women's 400 metres T11 event at the 2016 Paralympic Games took place on 16 September 2016, at the Estádio Olímpico João Havelange.

== Heats ==
=== Heat 1 ===
19:54 15 September 2016:

Rank	Lane	Bib	Name	Nationality	Reaction	Time	Notes
1	3	119	Thalita Vitoria Simplicio da Silva	Brazil	0.209	58.71	Q
2	7	599	Lahja Ishitile	Namibia	0.276	58.97	
3	1	549	Diana Laura Coraza Castaneda	Mexico	0.228	59.29	
4	5	14	Esperanca Gicasso	Angola	0.251	1:04.17	

=== Heat 2 ===
20:00 15 September 2016:

Rank	Lane	Bib	Name	Nationality	Reaction	Time	Notes
1	1	105	Terezinha Guilhermina	Brazil	0.187	57.87	Q
2	5	187	Guohua Zhou	China	0.193	58.87	
3	7	692	Joanna Mazur	Poland	0.157	59.05	
	3	13	Befilia Buya	Angola			DSQ

=== Heat 3 ===
20:06 15 September 2016:

Rank	Lane	Bib	Name	Nationality	Reaction	Time	Notes
1	3	169	Cuiqing Liu	China	0.191	56.31	Q
2	7	936	Sol Rojas	Venezuela	0.155	56.83	q
	5	113	Lorena Salvatini Spoladore	Brazil			DSQ

== Final ==
17:30 16 September 2016:

Rank	Lane	Bib	Name	Nationality	Reaction	Time	Notes
1st place, gold medalist(s)	3	169	Cuiqing Liu	China	0.159	56.71	
2nd place, silver medalist(s)	1	936	Sol Rojas	Venezuela	0.154	57.64	
3rd place, bronze medalist(s)	5	105	Terezinha Guilhermina	Brazil	0.218	57.97	
	7	119	Thalita Vitoria Simplicio da Silva	Brazil	0.261		DSQ
