= Venezuela at the 1992 Summer Paralympics =

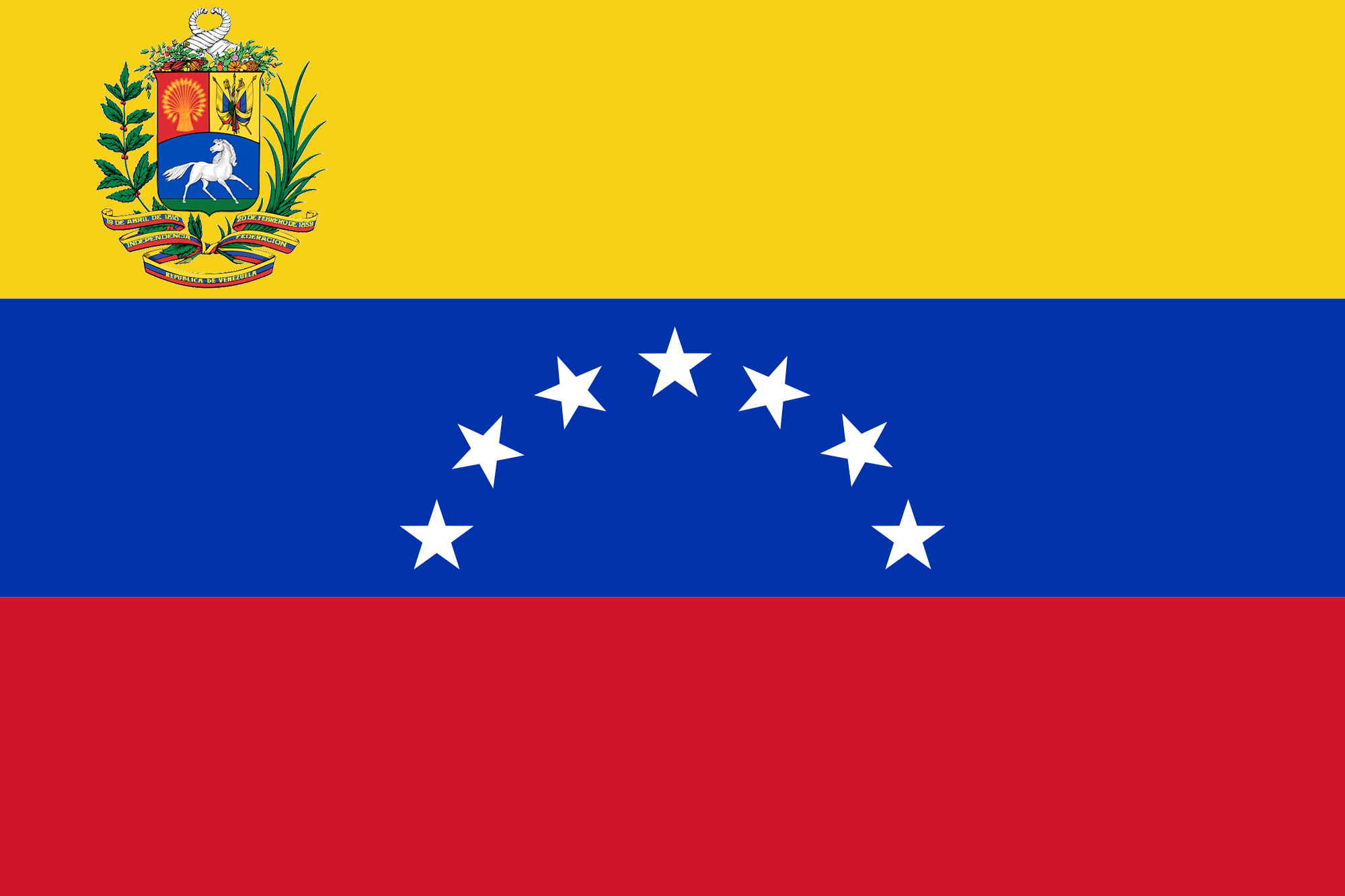
- IPC code: VEN
- NPC: Comité Paralimpico Venezolano

in Barcelona
- Competitors: 10
- Medals Ranked 55th: Gold 0 Silver 0 Bronze 1 Total 1

Summer Paralympics appearances (overview)
- 1984; 1988; 1992; 1996; 2000; 2004; 2008; 2012; 2016; 2020; 2024

Venezuela competed at the 1992 Summer Paralympics in Barcelona, Madrid Spain. 10 competitors from Venezuela won a single bronze medal and finished joint 50th in the medal table with 7 other countries.

== See also ==
- Venezuela at the Paralympics
- Venezuela at the 1992 Summer Olympics
