= Angélique Quessandier =

French Paralympic judoka

Angelique Quessandier
Personal information
- Born: 13 August 1986 (age 39) Bagnols-sur-Cèze, France
- Home town: Rouen, France
- Occupation: Judoka

Sport
- Country: France
- Sport: Para judo
Medal record
Para judo
Representing France
Paralympic Games
Bronze medal – third place	2004 Athens	-63kg
Bronze medal – third place	2008 Beijing	-63kg
European Championships
Gold medal – first place	2005 Vlaardingen	-63kg

Profile at external databases
- JudoInside.com: 89843

Angelique Quessandier (born 13 August 1986) is a visually impaired French judoka who competes in international level events. She has participated in two Paralympic Games and winning two bronze medals for her country.
