= Davyd Khorava =

Ukrainian Paralympic judoka

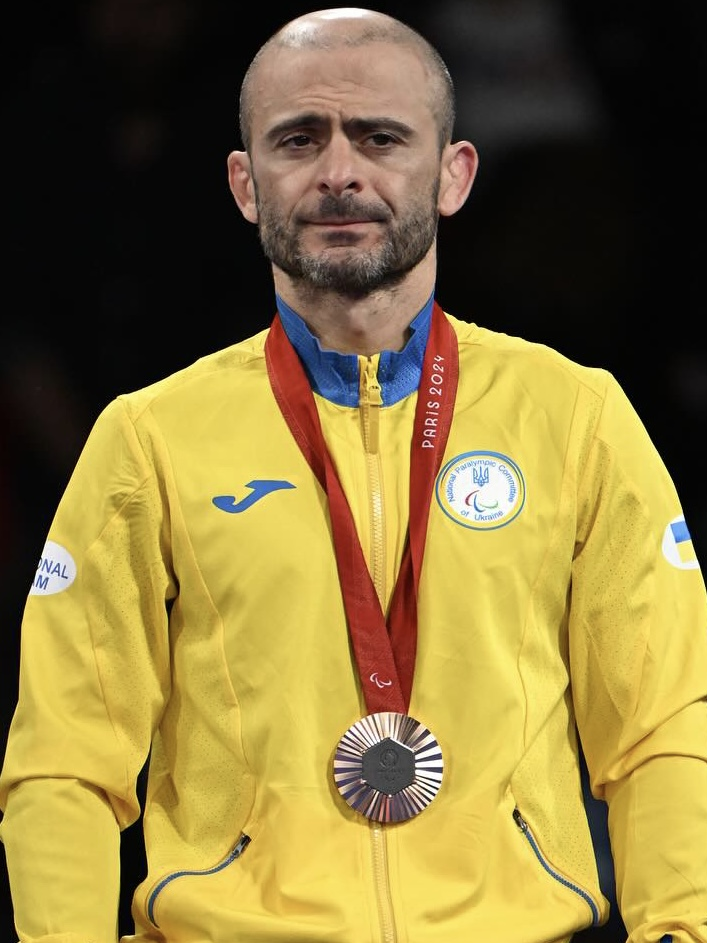
- Khorava at the 2024 Summer Paralympics

Personal information
- Born: 29 June 1988 (age 38)
- Occupation: Judoka

Sport
- Country: Ukraine
- Sport: Para judo
- Disability class: J2
- Weight class: −60 kg
Medal record
Men's para judo
Representing Algeria
Paralympic Games
Gold medal – first place	2012 London	66 kg
Bronze medal – third place	2016 Rio de Janeiro	66 kg
Bronze medal – third place	2024 Paris	60 kg J2
European Para Championships
Gold medal – first place	2023 Rotterdam	60 kg J2

Profile at external databases
- IJF: 64921
- JudoInside.com: 89785

Davyd Khorava (Ukrainian: Давид Елгуджаєвич Хорава; born 29 June 1988) is a Ukrainian Paralympic judoka.

== Career ==
He represented Ukraine at the 2012 Summer Paralympics and at the 2016 Summer Paralympics and he won two medals: the gold medal in the men's 66 kg event in 2012 and the bronze medal in the men's 66 kg event in 2016.

He won the silver medal in the men's 66 kg event at the 2015 IBSA European Judo Championships held in Odivelas, Portugal.
