= Judo at the 2008 Summer Paralympics – Women's 63 kg =

The women's 63 kg judo competition at the 2008 Summer Paralympics was held on September 8 at the Beijing Workers' Gymnasium. Preliminary rounds started at 12:00 pm CST. Repechage finals, semifinals, bouts for bronze medals, and the final were held at 5:00 pm CST.

This event was the third-heaviest of the women's judo weight classes, limiting competitors to a maximum of 63 kilograms of body mass. Like all other judo events, bouts lasted five minutes. If the bout was still tied at the end, it was extended for another five-minute, sudden-death period; if neither judoka scored during that period, the match is decided by the judges. The tournament bracket consisted of a single-elimination contest culminating in a gold medal match. There was also a repechage to determine the winners of the two bronze medals. Each judoka who had lost to a semifinalist competed in the repechage. The two judokas who lost in the semifinals faced the winner of the opposite half of the bracket's repechage in bronze medal bouts.

== Medalists ==
Gold	Naomi Soazo; Venezuela
Silver	Marta Arce; Spain
Bronze	Angelique Quessandier; France
Bronze	Madina Kazakova; Russia

== Tournament results ==
First Round
Marta Arce (ESP)	1001
Lucia Teixeira (BRA)	0001

Quarterfinals
Marta Arce (ESP)	0200
Angelique Quessandier (FRA)	0000
Madina Kazakova (RUS)	1000
Kannika Aimthisung (THA)	0000
Naomi Soazo (VEN)	1000
Zhou Qian (CHN)	0001
Khashtsetseg Batsukh (MGL)	0010
Elvira Kivi (SWE)	1000

Semifinals
Marta Arce (ESP)	0011^{1}
Madina Kazakova (RUS)	0002
Naomi Soazo (VEN)	0240
Elvira Kivi (SWE)	0120^{2}

Final
Marta Arce (ESP)	0000
Naomi Soazo (VEN)	1000

=== Repechage ===
First round
Lucia Teixeira (BRA)	0100
Angelique Quessandier (FRA)	1001
Kannika Aimthisung (THA)
Bye
Zhou Qian (CHN)
Bye
Khashtsetseg Batsukh (MGL)
Bye

Second round
Angelique Quessandier (FRA)	1000
Kannika Aimthisung (THA)	0000
Zhou Qian (CHN)	1000
Khashtsetseg Batsukh (MGL)	0000

Third round
Angelique Quessandier (FRA)	1010
Elvira Kivi (SWE)	0000
Zhou Qian (CHN)	0010
Madina Kazakova (RUS)	1010
