= Judo at the 2004 Summer Paralympics – Women's 63 kg =

Judo - Women's up to 63 kg at the XII Paralympic Games
- Paralympic Judo
- Venue: Ano Liossia Olympic Hall
- Dates: 19 September 2004; 20 years ago
- Competitors: 6 from 6 nations

Medalists
1st place, gold medalist(s)		Madina Kazakova	Russia
2nd place, silver medalist(s)		Silke Huettler	Germany
3rd place, bronze medalist(s)		Angelique Quessandier	France
3rd place, bronze medalist(s)		Monica Merenciano	Spain

The Women's up to 63 kg judo competition at the 2004 Summer Paralympics was held on 19 September at the Ano Liossia Olympic Hall.

The tournament bracket consisted of a single-elimination contest culminating in a gold medal match. There was also a repechage to determine the winners of the two bronze medals. As there were only 6 contestants in total the repechage consisted of just the two bronze medal bouts.

The event was won by Madina Kazakova, representing Russia.

== Results ==
The four digits represent scores of ippon, waza-ari, yuko and koka (which was still used at the time). A letter indicates a penalty of shido, chui, keikoku or hansoku make, which (at the time) also registered a score of koka, yuko, waza-ari or ippon, respectively, to the opponent. Penalties are escalated, thus 2 shido = chui, 3 shido = keikoku, 4 shido = hansoku make, save that a penalty of hansoku make direct results in exclusion from the remainder of the competition, while if it results from escalation it does not.

=== Competition bracket ===
Quarterfinals
Madina Kazakova (RUS)	1001S
Angelique Quessandier (FRA)	0001S
Silke Huettler (GER)	0200
Monica Merenciano (ESP)	0010

Semifinals
Madina Kazakova (RUS)	1000
Zhang Qiong Hui (CHN)	0000
Maxine Ingram (GBR)	0000
Silke Huettler (GER)	1000

Finals
Madina Kazakova (RUS)	1000
Silke Huettler (GER)	0000

=== Repechage ===
Bronze medal matches
Angelique Quessandier (FRA)	1000
Maxine Ingram (GBR)	0000
Monica Merenciano (ESP)	1000
Zhang Qiong Hui (CHN)	0000
