= Venezuela at the 1984 Summer Paralympics =

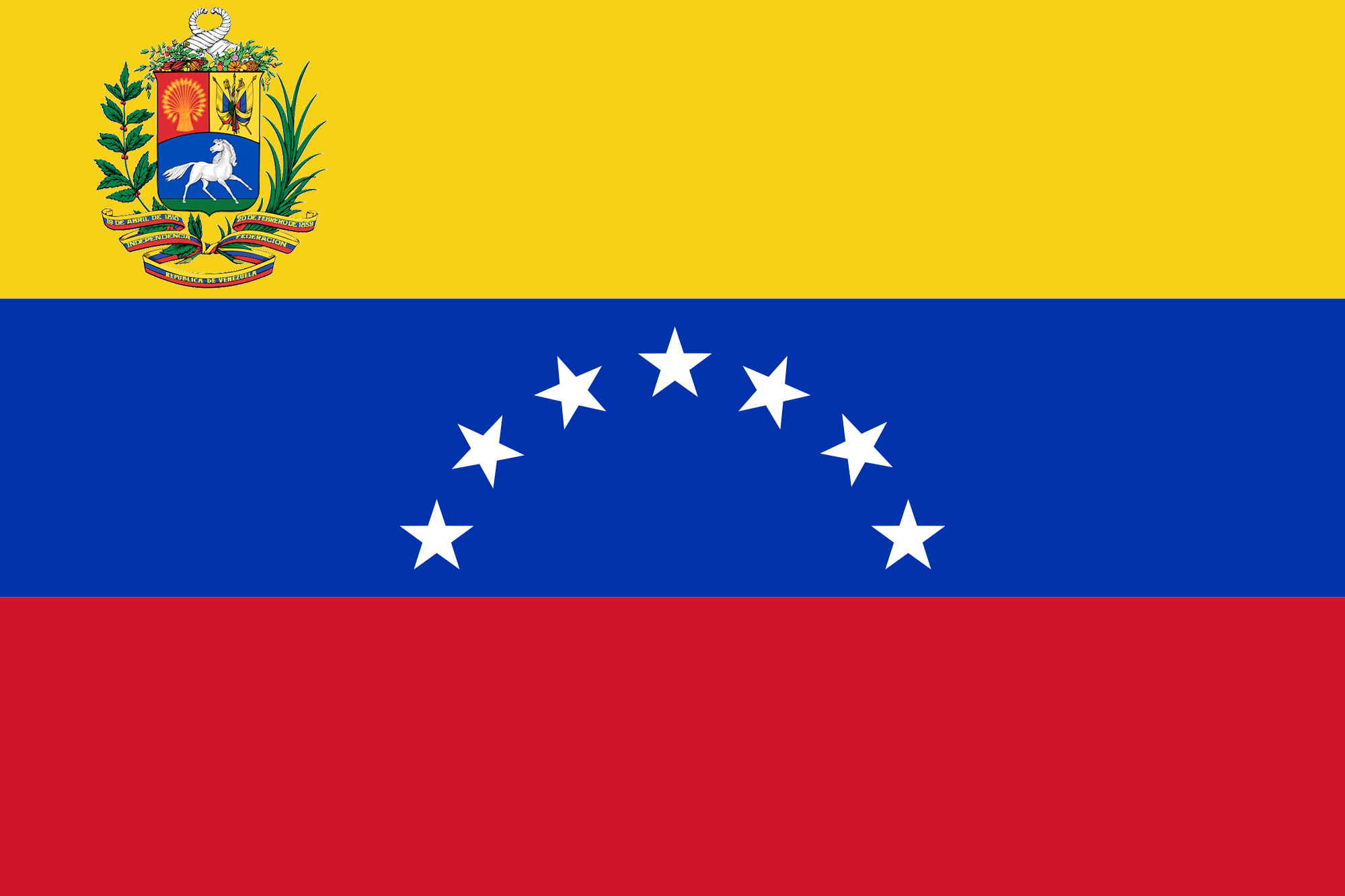
- IPC code: VEN
- NPC: Comité Paralimpico Venezolano

in Stoke Mandeville/New York
- Competitors: 6
- Medals: Gold 0 Silver 0 Bronze 0 Total 0

Summer Paralympics appearances (overview)
- 1984; 1988; 1992; 1996; 2000; 2004; 2008; 2012; 2016; 2020; 2024

Venezuela competed at the 1984 Summer Paralympics in Stoke Mandeville, Great Britain and New York City, United States. 6 competitors from Venezuela won no medals and so did not place in the medal table.

== See also ==
- Venezuela at the Paralympics
- Venezuela at the 1984 Summer Olympics
