= Venezuela at the 1996 Summer Paralympics =

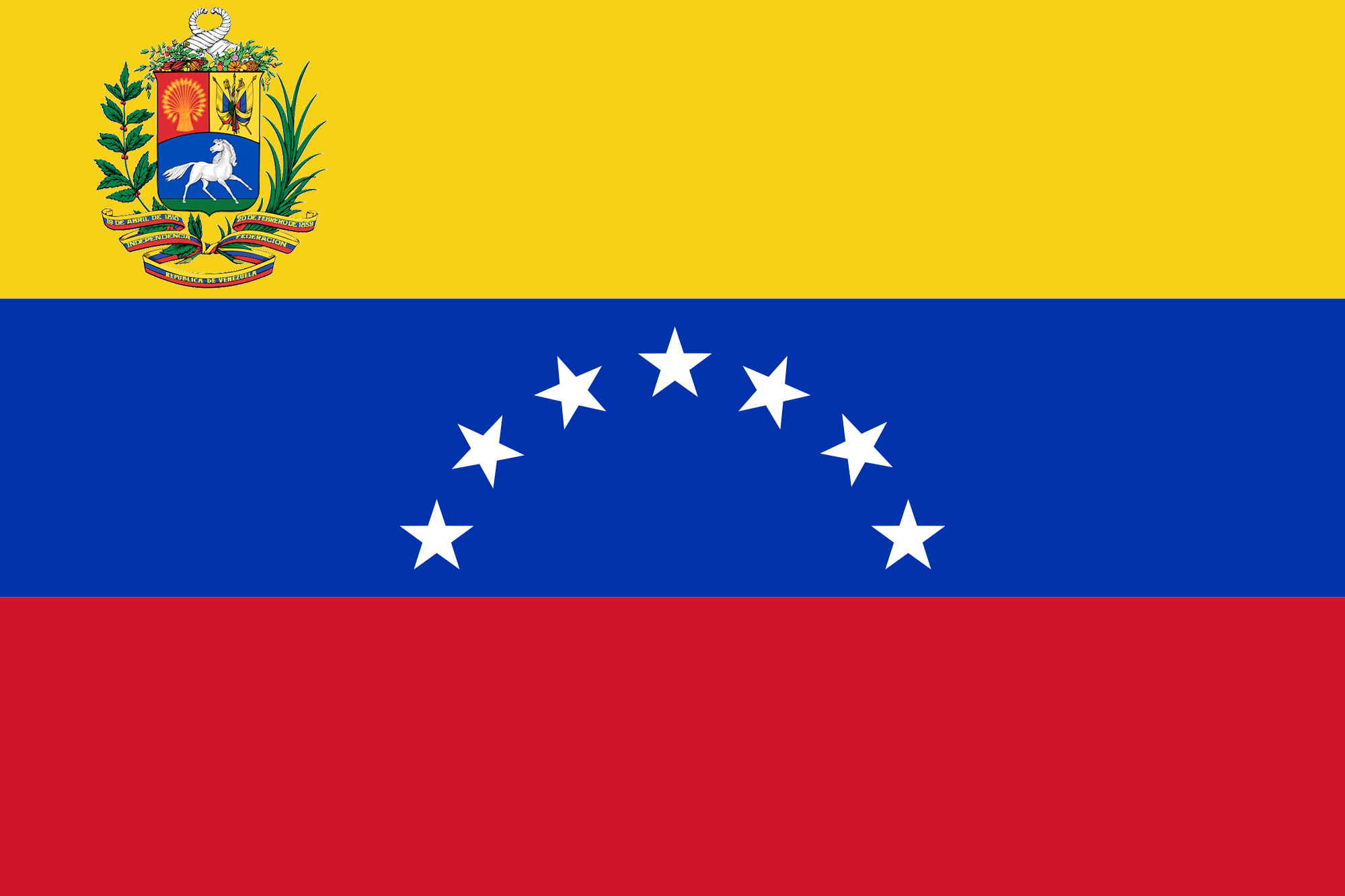
- IPC code: VEN
- NPC: Comité Paralimpico Venezolano

in Atlanta
- Competitors: 4
- Medals: Gold 0 Silver 0 Bronze 0 Total 0

Summer Paralympics appearances (overview)
- 1984; 1988; 1992; 1996; 2000; 2004; 2008; 2012; 2016; 2020; 2024

Four male athletes from Venezuela competed at the 1996 Summer Paralympics in Atlanta, United States.

== See also ==
- Venezuela at the Paralympics
- Venezuela at the 1996 Summer Olympics
