= Venezuela at the 2004 Summer Paralympics =

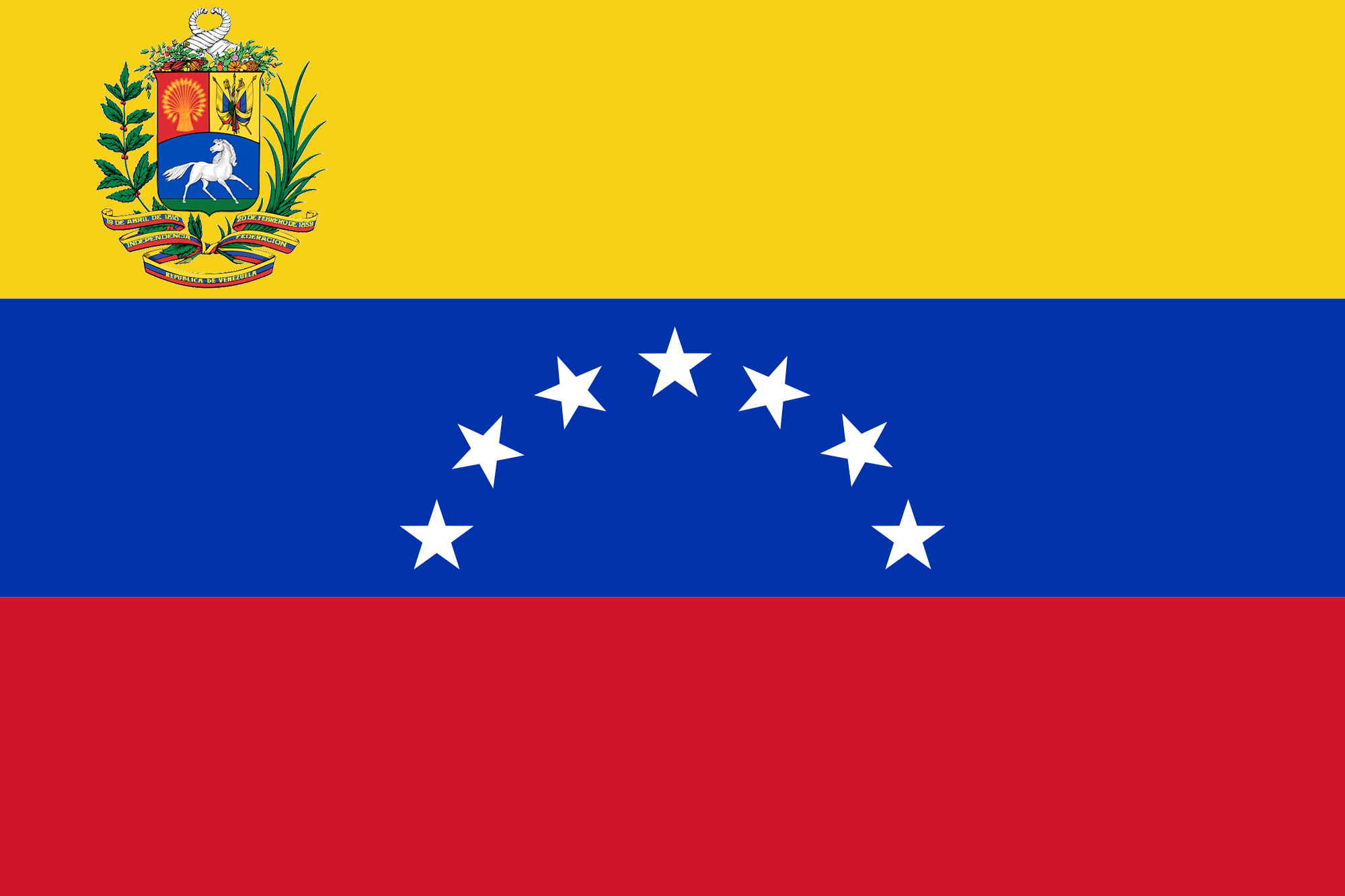
- IPC code: VEN
- NPC: Comité Paralimpico Venezolano

in Athens
- Competitors: 16 in 5 sports
- Flag bearer: Ricardo Santana
- Medals Ranked 63rd: Gold 0 Silver 1 Bronze 2 Total 3

Summer Paralympics appearances (overview)
- 1984; 1988; 1992; 1996; 2000; 2004; 2008; 2012; 2016; 2020; 2024

Venezuela competed at the 2004 Summer Paralympics in Athens, Greece. The team included sixteen athletes—fourteen men and two women. Venezuelan competitors won four medals, three silver and one bronze, to finish sixty-first in the medal table.

== Medallists ==
Medal	Name	Sport	Event
Silver	Ricardo Santana	Athletics	Men's 100m T12
Bronze	Ricardo Santana	Athletics	Men's 200m T12
Bronze	Anibal Bello; Odúver Daza; Ricardo Santana; José Villarreal	Athletics	Men's 4 × 100 m relay T11-13

== Sports ==
=== Archery ===
Athlete	Event	Ranking round		Round of 32	Round of 16	Quarterfinals	Semifinals	Finals	
Athlete	Event	Score	Seed	Opposition score	Opposition score	Opposition score	Opposition score	Opposition score	Rank
Luiz Martinez	Men's individual standing	538	19	Kopiy (UKR); W 138-133	Lyocsa (SVK); L 134-147	did not advance			

=== Athletics ===
==== Men's track ====
Athlete	Class	Event	Heats		Semifinal		Final	
Athlete	Class	Event	Result	Rank	Result	Rank	Result	Rank
Odúver Daza	T12	100m	11.50	14	did not advance			
Ricardo Santana	T12	100m	10.98	2 Q	11.04	3 Q	10.96	2nd place, silver medalist(s)
Ricardo Santana	T12	200m	22.55	3 Q	22.54	3 Q	22.46	3rd place, bronze medalist(s)
José Villarreal	T12	100m	11.28	5 Q	11.36	9	did not advance	
José Villarreal	T12	200m	23.50	12 q	23.59	11	did not advance	
José Villarreal	T12	400m	52.81	7 q	53.83	6 B	53.44	2
Anibal Bello; Odúver Daza; Ricardo Santana; José Villarreal	T11-13	4 × 100 m relay	43.82	2 Q	—		44.78	3rd place, bronze medalist(s)

==== Men's field ====
Athlete	Class	Event	Final		
Athlete	Class	Event	Result	Points	Rank
Anibal Bello	F11	Javelin	39.36	-	5
Odúver Daza	F12	Long jump	7.00	-	4
Renee Ladera	F55-56	Javelin	22.77	711	17
Renee Ladera	F56	Discus	24.01	-	10
Renee Ladera	F56	Shot put	8.65	-	15

==== Women's track ====
Athlete	Class	Event	Heats		Semifinal		Final	
Athlete	Class	Event	Result	Rank	Result	Rank	Result	Rank
Maria Burgos	T12	1500m	—				5:32.39	8

=== Cycling ===
==== Men's road ====
Athlete	Event	Time	Rank
Victor Marquez	Men's road race/time trial LC3	-	5

==== Men's track ====
Athlete	Event	Qualification		1st round		Final	
Athlete	Event	Time	Rank	Time	Rank	Opposition Time	Rank
Victor Marquez	Men's 1km time trial LC1-4	—				1:11.92	10
Victor Marquez	Men's individual pursuit LC3	4:16.41	8 Q	A Garcia (ESP); L 4:19.17	7	did not advance	

=== Judo ===
Athlete	Event	Preliminary	Quarterfinals	Semifinals	Repechage round 1	Repechage round 2	Final/ Bronze medal contest
Athlete	Event	Opposition Result	Opposition Result	Opposition Result	Opposition Result	Opposition Result	Opposition Result
Williams Montero	Men's 100kg	Dahmen (GER); L 0000C–0020	—		Shneyderman (RUS); L 0000-1000	did not advance	

=== Powerlifting ===
==== Men ====
Athlete	Event	Result	Rank
Jose Chirinos	90kg	170.0	11
Victor Jose Meza Martinez	+100kg	177.5	8
Jaime Morales	56kg	140.0	8

=== Swimming ===
==== Men ====
Athlete	Class	Event	Heats		Final	
Athlete	Class	Event	Result	Rank	Result	Rank
David Rangel	S13	50m freestyle	27.56	12	did not advance	
David Rangel	S13	100m freestyle	59.92	6 Q	1:00.23	6
David Rangel	S13	400m freestyle	5:01.14	9	did not advance	
David Rangel	S13	100m butterfly	1:09.46	9	did not advance	

==== Women ====
Athlete	Class	Event	Heats		Final	
Athlete	Class	Event	Result	Rank	Result	Rank
Valentina Rangel	SB12	100m breaststroke	1:38.92	11	did not advance	

=== Table tennis ===
==== Men ====
Athlete	Event	Preliminaries				Quarterfinals	Semifinals	Final / BM	
Athlete	Event	Opposition Result	Opposition Result	Opposition Result	Rank	Opposition Result	Opposition Result	Opposition Result	Rank
Gustavo Sandoval	Men's singles 4	Choi K S (KOR); L 0–3	Lin W H (TPE); L 0–3	Burkhardt (GER); L 0–3	4	did not advance			

== See also ==
- Venezuela at the Paralympics
- Venezuela at the 2004 Summer Olympics
