= Sid Ali Lamri (judoka) =

Algerian Paralympic judo

Medal record

Paralympic judo

Representing Algeria

Paralympic Games
Gold medal – first place	2008 Beijing	Men's 66 kg
Bronze medal – third place	2012 London	Men's 66 kg

Sid Ali Lamri is a male Algerian Paralympic judoka who participated in the 2004 Paralympics and 2008 Paralympics, winning one gold medal, and also participated in the 2012 Paralympics, winning one bronze medal.
