= Pasquale Gallo =

French Paralympic athlete

Medal record

Men's para athletics

Representing France

Paralympic Games
Bronze medal – third place	2008 Beijing	4x100m - T11-13

Pasquale Gallo (born 15 August 1988) is a Paralympian athlete from France who competes mainly in category T12 sprint events.

Pasquale competed in the T12 100m and 200m in the 2008 Summer Paralympics in Beijing. Though he failed to win a medal in either of these events he was part of the French team that won the bronze medal in the visually impaired 4 × 100 m.
