= Dalidaivis Rodríguez =

Cuban judoka

Dalidaivis Rodriguez
Personal information
- National team: Cuba
- Born: 7 August 1983 (age 42)
- Occupation: Judoka

Sport
- Country: Cuba
- Sport: Para judo
- Weight class: 63 kilograms (139 lb)
Medal record
Women's para judo
Representing Cuba
Parapan American Games
Gold medal – first place	2011 Guadalajara	63 kg
Gold medal – first place	2015 Toronto	63 kg
Summer Paralympics
Gold medal – first place	2012 London	63 kg
Gold medal – first place	2016 Rio de Janeiro	63 kg

Profile at external databases
- IJF: 16134
- JudoInside.com: 89849
- Updated on 11 November 2017

Dalidaivis Rodríguez Clark (born 7 August 1983) is a Cuban judoka who competes for her country. She won the gold medal in the 63 kilograms (139 lb) category at both the 2012 and 2016 Paralympic Games.

== Career ==
Dalidaivis Rodriguez Clark suffers from keratoconus, a degenerative disease which slowly reduces her ability to see. She trains with able bodied Cuban judokas, and does not use anything to improve her vision while doing so to prepare for competition conditions. She competed in Judo in the 62 kilograms (137 lb) category at the 2011 Parapan American Games in Guadalajara, Mexico. Clark won the gold medal at the 2012 Summer Paralympics in London, England. In 2014, Clark at the International Blind Sports Federation Judo World Cup in Colorado Springs, United States. At the time, she had a heavy cold, but fought regardless, defeating Sweden's Nicolina Pernheim, Finland's Paivi Tolppanen and China's Tong Zhou in the semi-final. She was defeated by the Ukrainian Iryna Husieva in the final.

Prior to the 2016 Summer Paralympics in Rio de Janeiro, Brazil, Clark spoke of her desire to fight Husieva once again. She credited a second victory at the Parapan American Games in the 2015 Toronto Games as being one of the key points of her build up to the Paralympics. Clark was selected as the flag bearer for the Cuban team at during the 2016 Summer Paralympics opening ceremony. Due to her victory at the 2012 Games, she was seeded into the semi-finals for the Judo tournament. She defeated Songlee Jin of South Korea, resulting in a rematch against Husieva in the final. Clark scored two waza-ari, and before defeating Husieva with an ippon to win the gold medal once more.
