= Athletics at the 2008 Summer Paralympics – Men's 4 × 100 metre relay T11–T13 =

The Men's 4x100 metre relay T11-T13 had its First Round held on September 15 at 19:04 and its Final on September 16 at 11:25.

== Medalists ==
Gold	Silver	Bronze
China (CHN); Xiangkun Liu; Li Qiang; Yuqing Yang; Yansong Li	Venezuela (VEN); Yoldani Silva; Ricardo Santana; Oduver Daza; Fernando Ferrer	France (FRA); Tresor Makunda; Pasquale Gallo; Stephane Bozzolo; Ronan Pallier

== Results ==
Place	Team		Round 1	Final
1	China (CHN)		42.80 WR	42.75 WR
1	Xiangkun Liu	T11	42.80 WR	42.75 WR
1	Li Qiang	T12	42.80 WR	42.75 WR
1	Yuqing Yang	T12	42.80 WR	42.75 WR
1	Yansong Li	T12	42.80 WR	42.75 WR
2	Venezuela (VEN)		44.76	43.55
2	Yoldani Silva	T12	44.76	43.55
2	Ricardo Santana	T12	44.76	43.55
2	Oduver Daza	F12	44.76	43.55
2	Fernando Ferrer	T11	44.76	43.55
3	France (FRA)		44.54	44.49
3	Tresor Makunda	T11	44.54	44.49
3	Pasquale Gallo	T12	44.54	44.49
3	Stephane Bozzolo	F12, P12	44.54	44.49
3	Ronan Pallier	F12	44.54	44.49
4	Angola (ANG)		45.30	45.40
4	Joaquim Manuel	T12	45.30	45.40
4	Octavio dos Santos	T11	45.30	45.40
4	Miguel Francisco	T11	45.30	45.40
4	Jose Armando	T11	45.30	45.40
5	Germany (GER)		45.35	
5	Matthias Schroder	T12	45.35	
5	Thomas Ulbricht	P12, F12	45.35	
5	Jorg Trippen-Hilgers	P12, F12	45.35	
5	Matthias Schmidt	T11	45.35	
	Azerbaijan (AZE)		DNF	
	Zynidin Bilalov	F11	DNF	
	Vugar Mehdiyev	T13	DNF	
	Reza Osmanov	T12	DNF	
	Elchin Muradov	T12	DNF	
	United States (USA)		DNF	
	Nelacey Porter	T11	DNF	
	Royal Mitchell	T13	DNF	
	Lex Gillette	F11	DNF	
	Josiah Jamison	T12	DNF	
	Russia (RUS)		DNS	
	Evgeny Kegelev	F12	DNS	
	Alexey Labzin	T13	DNS	
	Fedor Trikolich	T12	DNS	
	Andrey Koptev	F11	DNS	
	Brazil (BRA)		DSQ	
	Julio Cesar Souza	T12	DSQ	
	Felipe Gomes	F11	DSQ	
	Andre Luiz Andrade	T13	DSQ	
	Lucas Prado	T11	DSQ	
	Portugal (POR)		DSQ	
	Gabriel Potra	P12, T12	DSQ	
	Carlos Lopes	T11	DSQ	
	Luis Goncalves	T12	DSQ	
	Firmino Baptista	T11	DSQ	
