= Bayram Mustafayev =

Azerbaijani paralympic judoka

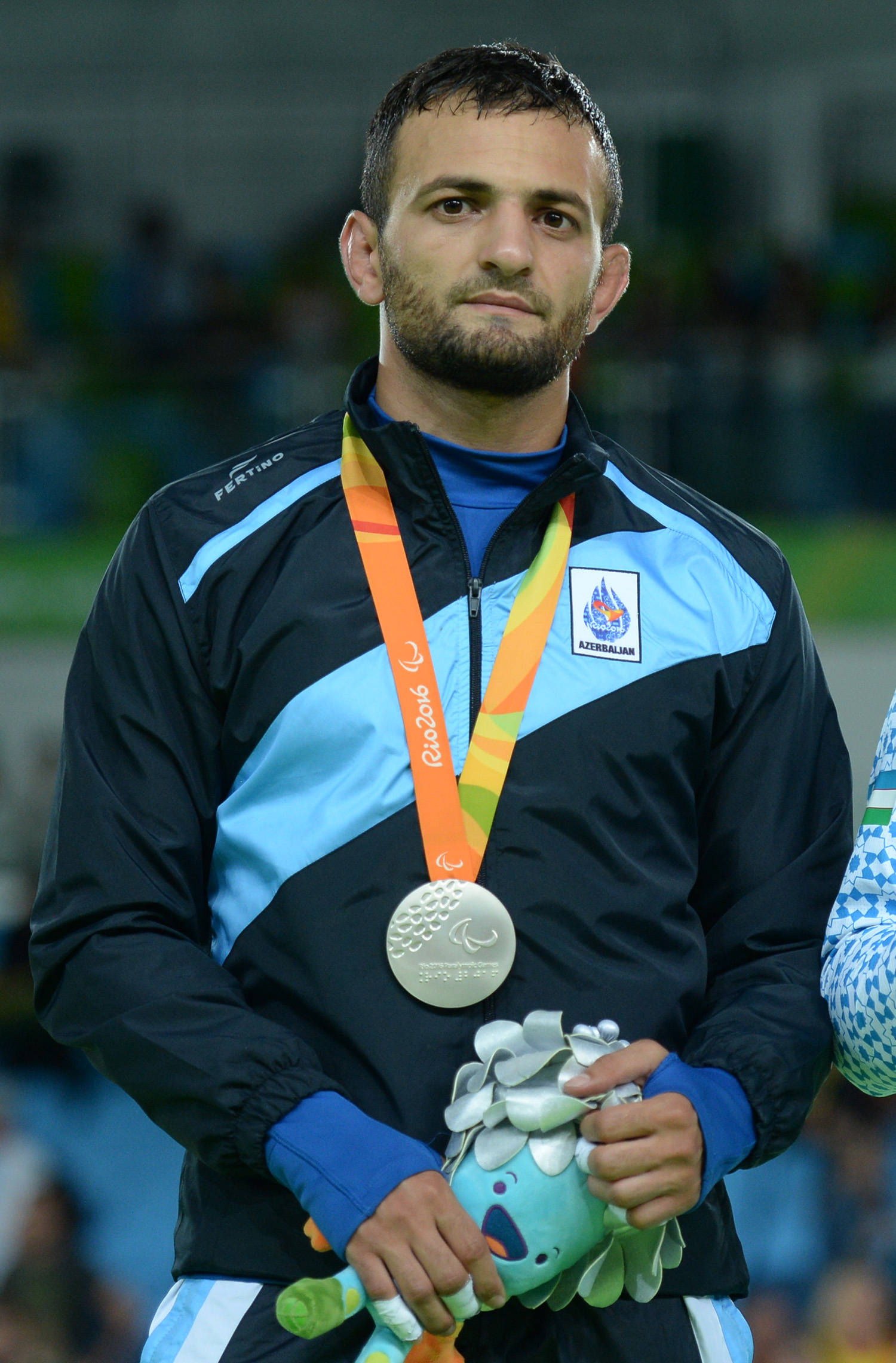

Medal record

Men's Judo

Representing Azerbaijan

Paralympic Games
Silver medal – second place	2016 Rio de Janeiro	66 kg

World Championships
Gold medal – first place	2014 Colorado Springs	66 kg

European Championships
Gold medal – first place	2011 Crawley	66 kg
Gold medal – first place	2013 Eger	66 kg
Gold medal – first place	2015 Odivelas	66 kg

Islamic Solidarity Games
Silver medal – second place	2017 Baku	66 kg

Bayram Mustafayev (Azerbaijani: Bayram Mustafayev, born 23 May 1987, Baku, Azerbaijan SSR, USSR) is a three-time European (2011, 2013, 2015) and world champion (2014) Paralympic judoka of Azerbaijan. He won silver medalist in the 66 kg division at 2016 Summer Paralympics.
