= Naomi Soazo =

Venezuelan judoka (born 1988)

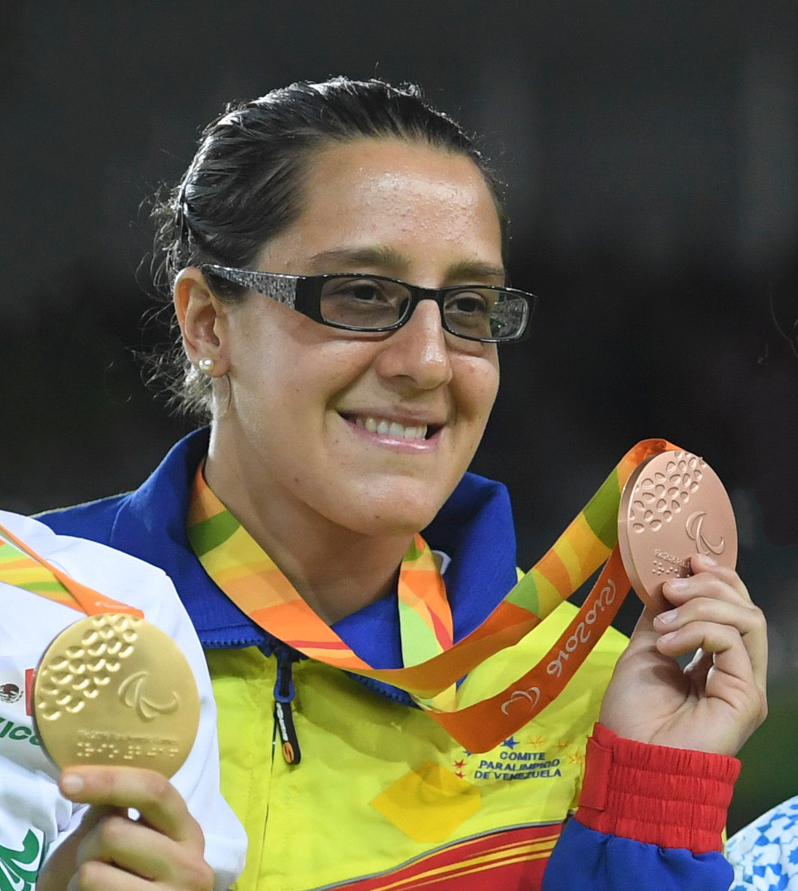
- Soazo at the 2016 paralympics

Personal information
- Full name: Naomi Alejandra Soazo Boccardo
- Nationality: Venezuelan
- Born: 19 December 1988 (age 37)
- Education: Universidad Santa María
- Occupation: Judoka

Sport
- Country: Venezuela
- Sport: Judo
Medal record
Representing Venezuela
Paralympic Games
Gold medal – first place	2008 Beijing	-63 kg
Bronze medal – third place	2016 Rio de Janeiro	-70 kg
Parapan American Games
Bronze medal – third place	2015 Toronto	-70kg

Profile at external databases
- JudoInside.com: 89864

Naomi Alejandra Soazo Boccardo (Note: In this Spanish name, the first or paternal surname is Soazo and the second or maternal family name is Boccardo.) (born 19 December 1988) is a visually impaired Venezuelan judoka. She competed in a number of international events, such as the International Blind Sports Federation World Championships, but is best known for being the only Venezuelan, in any sport, to have won a gold medal at the Paralympic Games.

She made her Paralympic Games début at the 2008 Summer Paralympics in Beijing, in the women's up to 63 kg category. Defeating Zhou Qian of China by ippon within less than a minute in her first match, she then defeated Sweden's Elvira Kivi by waza-ari-awasete-ippon in the semifinal. In the final, it took her just three seconds to defeat Spain's completely blind Marta Arce by ippon and win Venezuela's first ever Paralympic gold medal.

At the 2012 Paralympics Soazo lost her first bout to the eventual gold medalist, but continued competing through repechage, and lost a bronze medal match to Daniele Bernardes Milan of Brazil. At the 2016 Paralympics Soazo won a bronze medal in the 70 kg category.
