= Sol Rojas =

Venezuelan Paralympic athlete

Sport
- Country: Venezuela
- Sport: Para-athletics
- Disability: Vision impairment
- Disability class: T11
- Event: 400 metres
Medal record
Women's para-athletics
Representing Venezuela
Paralympic Games
Silver medal – second place	2016 Rio de Janeiro	400 m T11
Parapan American Games
Bronze medal – third place	2023 Santiago	200 m T11

Sol Rojas is a Venezuelan Paralympic athlete. She represented Venezuela at the 2016 Summer Paralympics and she won the silver medal in the women's 400 metres T11 event. She was also the flag bearer for her country during the 2016 Summer Paralympics Parade of Nations.

== Achievements ==
Year	Competition	Venue	Position	Event	Notes
Representing Venezuela
2016	Summer Paralympics	Rio de Janeiro, Brazil	2nd	400 m	57.64
