= Venezuela at the 2012 Summer Paralympics =

- IPC code: VEN
- NPC: Comité Paralimpico Venezolano

in London
- Competitors: 27
- Medals Ranked 73rd: Gold 0 Silver 0 Bronze 2 Total 2

Summer Paralympics appearances (overview)
- 1984; 1988; 1992; 1996; 2000; 2004; 2008; 2012; 2016; 2020; 2024

Venezuela competed at the 2012 Summer Paralympics in London, United Kingdom from August 29 to September 9, 2012.

== Medallists ==
Medal	Name	Sport	Event	Date
Bronze	Marcos Falcon	Judo	Men's 66 kg	August 30
Bronze	Omar Monterola	Athletics	Men's 200 metres T37	August 31
