= Darren Harris (Paralympian) =

Football and judo Paralympian (born 1973)

Personal information
- Born: 20 June 1973 (age 53) Wolverhampton, Great Britain

Sport
- Sport: Blind football Para judo
Medal record
Representing Great Britain
Football 5-a-side
IBSA World Games
Silver medal – second place	2015 Seoul	Men's team B1
IBSA Blind Football European Championships
Bronze medal – third place	1997 Barcelona	Men's team B1
Bronze medal – third place	1999 Porto	Men's team B1
Bronze medal – third place	1997 Barcelona	Men's team B1
Silver medal – second place	2001 Paris	Men's team B1
Silver medal – second place	2003 Manchester	Men's team B1
Bronze medal – third place	2005 Torremolinos	Men's team B1
Silver medal – second place	2007 Athens	Men's team B1
Bronze medal – third place	2011 Aksaray	Men's team B1
Bronze medal – third place	2017 Berlin	Men's team B1
Bronze medal – third place	2019 Rome	Men's team B1
Para judo
European Championships
Silver medal – second place	2007 Baku	Men's -66kg
Bronze medal – third place	2009 Debrecen	Men's -66kg

Darren Harris (born 20 June 1973) is a two-sport (dual) Paralympian in football and judo. He is England’s highest capped and most decorated blind footballer, with 157 appearances and ten World and European medals. Outside of sports, he is a bestselling author, international motivational speaker, and mental skills coach.

Harris was inducted into the Football Hall of Fame in 2025.

== Early life ==
Harris went to New College Worcester as his sight continued to deteriorate. However, sport helped him deal with his disability.

== Professional sports career ==
=== Football (1996–2007) ===
Harris made his England debut in 1996 and became captain in 2002. He led the team to qualification for the 2004 Paralympics, but did not compete because the other Home Nations would not sanction an England team to play as Great Britain. He captained the team to qualification again for the 2008 Paralympics, but did not compete in the tournament himself, having also qualified in judo.

=== Judo (2005–2011) ===
Harris represented Great Britain in judo at the 2008 Paralympics in the -66 kg weight category.

=== Football (2011–2019) ===
Harris represented Great Britain in football at the 2012 Summer Paralympics, where the team finished 7th.

=== Domestic honours ===
Domestic honours. Harris was inducted into the Football Hall of Fame in 2025.

== Other roles ==
Harris received an honorary doctorate from The Open University in 2014 for outstanding public service. He is a brand ambassador for Motability, a non-executive director of the Kaleidoscope Plus Group, a patron of the Childhood Eye Cancer Trust, and a governor of Wylde Green Primary School.
