= Marta Arce Payno =

Spanish judo athlete

Marta Arce
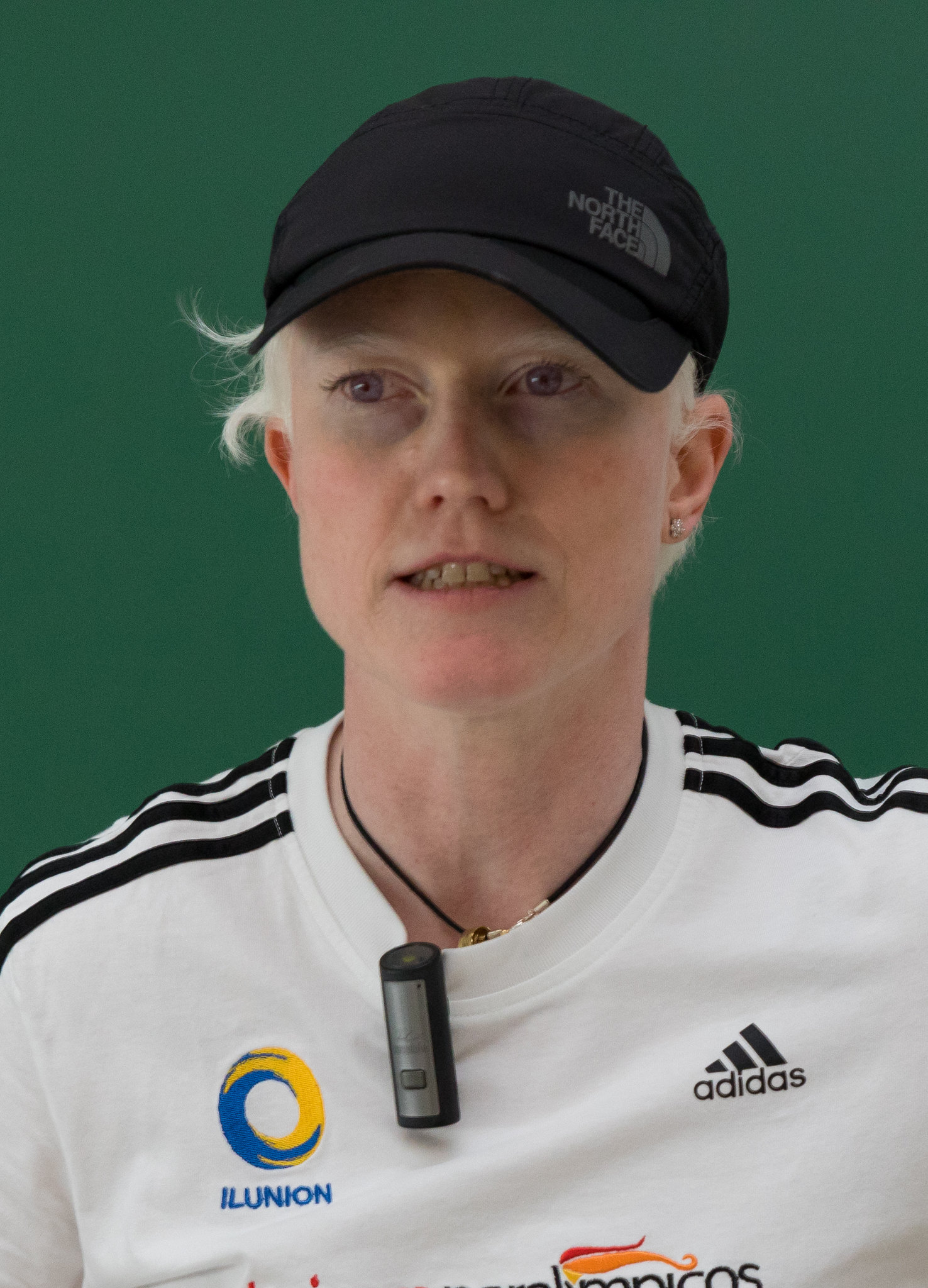

Personal information
- Full name: Marta Arce Payno
- Nationality: Spanish
- Born: 27 July 1977 (age 48) Valladolid, Spain
- Occupation: Judoka
- Website: www.martaarce.es

Sport
- Country: Spain
- Sport: Judo
Medal record
Women's judo
Representing Spain
Paralympic Games
Silver medal – second place	2004 Athens	-57 kg
Silver medal – second place	2008 Beijing	-63 kg
Bronze medal – third place	2012 London	-63 kg
Bronze medal – third place	2024 Paris	-57 kg
European Para Championships
Bronze medal – third place	2023 Rotterdam	-57 kg J2

Profile at external databases
- IJF: 65008
- JudoInside.com: 89719

Marta Arce Payno (born 27 July 1977) is a B3 classified Spanish judo competitor who has represented Spain at the 2004, 2008, 2012 and 2024 Summer Paralympics where she has won a pair of silver medals and a pair of bronze medals.

== Personal ==
Arce was born in Valladolid with a form of albinism that led to progressive loss of vision to the point where she lost all her sight. She speaks four languages, Spanish, English, Italian and Japanese. She is a mother, giving birth in 2009. Her day job is being a physical therapist working for the Autonomous University of Madrid. In November 2013, she participated in a program run by the Programa ADOP Empleo to train Paralympic athletes in developing business communication and entrepreneurship skills.

== Judo ==
Arce is a B3 classified judo competitor. She started participating in judo after moving to Madrid to attend university. Her entrance to the sport was through her brother who was active in it at that time. From that point on, she did almost daily training in the sport.

The first IPC European Judo Championships Arce competed in were the ones hosted in Città di Castello where she picked up a gold medal. She competed at the European Championships held in 1999 in Italy. In 2001, she competed at a World Cup event in Rio de Janeiro. Competing at the 2004 Summer Paralympics, she won a silver medal. The 2004 Games were the first time women's judo appeared on the Paralympic programme. At the 2008 Summer Paralympics in Beijing, she repeated her performance and won another silver medal. In October 2011, she competed in a regional Spanish national vision impaired judo event in Guadalajara. She competed at the London hosted 2012 Summer Paralympics in judo, where she won a bronze medal. In her path to bronze, she competed against Swedish Nicolina Perheim and Cuban Dalidaivis Rodríguez Clark. Her bronze was the second bronze medal won by Spain in judo at the London Games, coming minutes after teammate Maria Monica Merenciano won bronze.
