= Jani Kallunki =

Finnish Paralympic judoka

Personal information
- Born: 5 November 1975 (age 50) Skövde, Sweden
- Home town: Vantaa, Finland
- Occupation: Judoka

Sport
- Country: Finland
- Sport: Paralympic judo
- Disability: Fetal retinal developmental disorder
- Retired: 2014
Medal record
Paralympic judo
Representing Finland
Paralympic Games
Bronze medal – third place	2004 Athens	Men's -66kg
Bronze medal – third place	2008 Beijing	Men's -66kg
World Championships
Gold medal – first place	2011 Antalya	Men's -66kg
Bronze medal – third place	2006 Brommat	Men's -66kg
European Championships
Gold medal – first place	2009 Debrecen	Men's -66kg
Silver medal – second place	2005 Vlaardingen	Men's -66kg
Bronze medal – third place	2013 Eger	Men's -66kg
Goalball
Paralympic Games
Gold medal – first place	1996 Atlanta	Men's tournament

Jani Kallunki (born 5 November 1975) is a retired Finnish Paralympic judoka who competed in international level events, he also participated in goalball at the 1996 Summer Paralympics, where he won the gold medal for his country. He is a double Paralympic bronze medalist, a European champion and a World bronze medalist.

Kallunki was born in Sweden to Finnish parents, he started wrestling when he was six years old. He then switched to goalball aged sixteen and played for the national team who won the gold medal at the 1996 Summer Paralympics.

Kallunki retired from sport in 2014 after a 30-year sporting career due to a relapsed neck injury from the 2012 IBSA World Judo Championships.
