= Elvira Kivi =

Swedish judoka (born 1987)

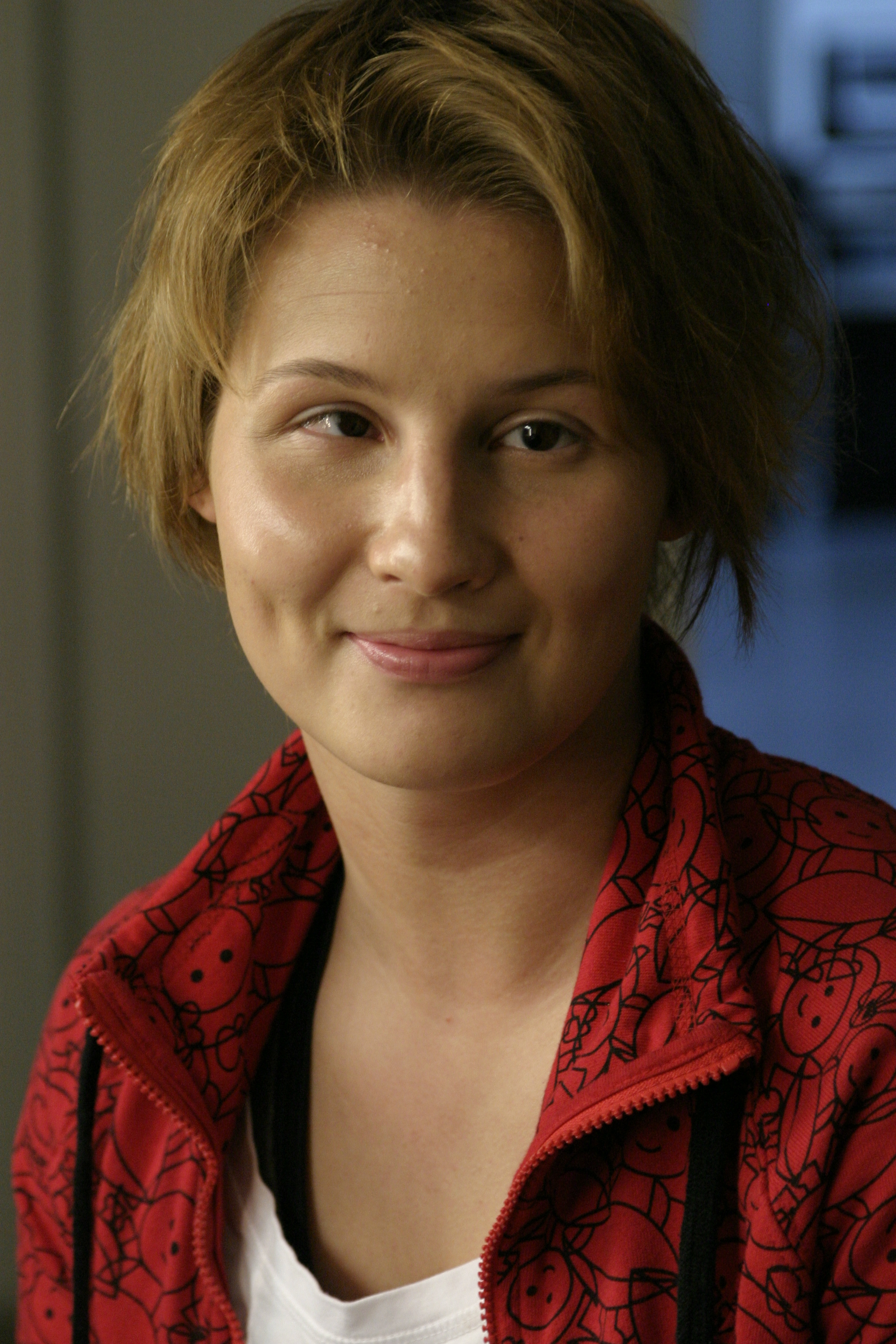
- Kivi in 2008

Personal information
- Born: 19 September 1987 (age 38)
- Home town: Trollhattan, Sweden
- Occupation: Judoka

Sport
- Country: Sweden
- Sport: Para judo
- Disability: Visual impairment
- Club: Lilla Edets JK
Medal record
Para judo
Representing Sweden
European Championships
Bronze medal – third place	2005 Vlaardingen	Women's -63kg

Profile at external databases
- JudoInside.com: 39000

Elvira Kivi (born 19 September 1987) is a visually impaired Swedish judoka.
