= Fernando Ferrer (athlete) =

Venezuelan Paralympic athlete

Medal record

Paralympic athletics

Representing Venezuela

Paralympic Games
Silver medal – second place	2008 Beijing	4x100m - T11-13

Fernando Ferrer is a Venezuelan Paralympian athlete competing mainly in category T11 sprint events.

Fernando competed in the T12 100m at the 2008 Summer Paralympics in Beijing, he also went on to win a silver medal with his Venezuelan teammates in the T11-13 4 × 100 m behind host nation China.
