= Marcos Falcón =

Venezuelan Paralympic judoka (born 1982)

Personal information
- Full name: Marcos José Falcón Tovar
- Born: 31 March 1982 (age 44) Los Teques, Venezuela
- Height: 165 cm (5 ft 5 in)

Sport
- Country: Venezuela
- Sport: Paralympic judo
Medal record
Paralympic judo
Representing Venezuela
Paralympic Games
Bronze medal – third place	2012 London	Men's -66kg
Parapan American Games
Gold medal – first place	2015 Toronto	Men's -66kg
Bronze medal – third place	2007 Rio de Janeiro	Men's -66kg
Bronze medal – third place	2011 Guadalajara	Men's -66kg
Bronze medal – third place	2019 Lima	Men's -66kg

Marcos José Falcón Tovar (born 31 March 1982) is a Venezuelan Paralympic judoka who competes in international level events.

== Career ==
He is a Paralympic bronze medalist from the 2012 Summer Paralympics and is a four-time Parapan American Games medalist.
