= David García del Valle =

Spanish paralympic judoka (born 1981)

David Garcia
Personal information
- Full name: David Garcia del Valle
- Nationality: Spanish
- Born: 13 June 1981 (age 45) Almeria, Spain
- Occupation: Judoka

Sport
- Country: Spain
- Sport: Para judo
- Disability class: B2

David Garcia del Valle (born 13 June 1981) is a judo athlete from Spain, who has represented Spain at the 2000 Summer Paralympics, 2004 Summer Paralympics, 2008 Summer Paralympics and 2012 Summer Paralympics, winning a pair of silver medals in 2000 and 2004.

== Personal ==
García was born 13 June 1981 in Almeria. He has a vision impairment. He resides in Granada.

== Judo ==
García is a B2 classified judo competitor. He took home a gold medal in his weight class at the 2011 IPC European Judo Championships. In October 2011, he competed in a regional Spanish national vision impaired judo event in Guadalajara. In 2012, he won the Spanish national disability judo championship. He competed in the 2013 Spanish national disability judo championship organized by the Spanish Federation of Sports for the Blind. In April 2013, he was one of the organizers of the II Festival Soliadrio Jushirokan in Madrid. The event was a master class in judo. The 2013 IPC European Judo Championships were held in early December in Eger, Hungary, and he competed in them in the (under 66 kilos event. He lost his first match of the competition. Going into the competition, he was viewed as one of the favorites to potentially win a medal for Spain.

=== Paralympics ===
García competed in judo at the 2000 Summer Paralympics, 2004 Summer Paralympics, 2008 Summer Paralympics and 2012 Summer Paralympics. He earned a silver in the Up to 66 kg men's group at the 2000 and 2004 Games. In November 2013, he competed in the Open Judo Tournament Guadalajara.
