= Uzbekistan at the Paralympics =

- IPC code: UZB
- NPC: Uzbekistan National Paralympic Association
- Medals Ranked 55th: Gold 26 Silver 21 Bronze 30 Total 77

Summer appearances
- 2004; 2008; 2012; 2016; 2020; 2024

Winter appearances
- 2014; 2018; 2022

Other related appearances
- Soviet Union (1988); Unified Team (1992)

Uzbekistan made its Paralympic Games début at the 2004 Summer Paralympics in Athens, with a single representative (Yusup Kadyrov) in powerlifting. Competing in the men's up to 75 kg category, Kadyrov failed to lift a weight. In the 2008 Summer Paralympics, Uzbekistan sent two competitors: a powerlifter and a swimmer; they failed to win any medals again.

In 2012 Summer Paralympics in London, Sharif Khalilov won Uzbekistan's first medal: a silver medal in judo in men's -73 kg event. Since then, they have established themselves in the top 20 of national Paralympic committees, coming 16th in 2016 in Rio de Janeiro with 31 medals, 16th again in Tokyo 2020, and 13th in Paris 2024.

Uzbekistan took part in the 2014 Winter Paralympics and 2018 Winter Paralympics but did not win any medals. They did not send any athletes to Beijing 2022.

== Medals ==
=== Medals by Summer Games ===
Games	Athletes	Gold	Silver	Bronze	Total	Rank
(Italy) Rome 1960	did not participate					
(Japan) Tokyo 1964	did not participate					
(Israel) Tel Aviv 1968	did not participate					
(West Germany) Heidelberg 1972	did not participate					
(Canada) Toronto 1976	did not participate					
(Netherlands) Arnhem 1980	did not participate					
(United States) New York 1984	did not participate					
(South Korea) Seoul 1988	did not participate					
(Spain) Barcelona 1992	did not participate					
(United States) Atlanta 1996	did not participate					
(Australia) Sydney 2000	did not participate					
(Greece) Athens 2004	1	0	0	0	0	-
(China) Beijing 2008	2	0	0	0	0	-
(United Kingdom) London 2012	10	0	1	0	1	67
(Brazil) Rio de Janeiro 2016	32	8	6	17	31	16
(Japan) Tokyo 2020	44	8	5	6	19	15
(France) Paris 2024	65	10	9	7	26	0
Total (6/17)	154	26	21	30	77	54

=== Medals by Winter Games ===
Games	Athletes	Gold	Silver	Bronze	Total	Rank
(Sweden) Örnsköldsvik 1976	did not participate					
(Norway) Geilo 1980	did not participate					
(Austria) Innsbruck 1984	did not participate					
(Austria) Innsbruck 1988	did not participate					
(France) Albertville 1992	did not participate					
(Norway) Lillehammer 1994	did not participate					
(Japan) Nagano 1998	did not participate					
(United States) Salt Lake City 2002	did not participate					
(Italy) Turin 2006	did not participate					
(Canada) Vancouver 2010	did not participate					
(Russia) Sochi 2014	2	0	0	0	0	-
(South Korea) Pyeongchang 2018	1	0	0	0	0	-
(China) Beijing 2022		did not participate				
Total (2/13)	3	0	0	0	0	−

=== Medals by Summer Sport ===
Sport	Gold	Silver	Bronze	Total
Athletics	8	3	5	16
Judo	5	4	8	17
Swimming	2	4	8	14
Taekwondo	1	0	0	1
Powerlifting	0	1	1	2
Shooting	0	0	1	1
Totals (6 entries)	16	12	23	51

=== Medals by Winter Sport ===
Sport	Gold	Silver	Bronze	Total
Totals (0 entries)	0	0	0	0

== Medalists ==
=== 2012 ===
Medal	Name	Games	Sport	Event
Silver	Sharif Khalilov	(United Kingdom) 2012 London	Judo	Men's -73 kg

=== 2016 ===
Medal	Name	Games	Sport	Event
Gold	Khusniddin Norbekov	(Brazil) 2016 Rio de Janeiro	Athletics	Men's discus throw F37
Gold	Aleksandr Svechnikov	(Brazil) 2016 Rio de Janeiro	Athletics	Men's javelin throw F13
Gold	Nozimakhon Kayumova	(Brazil) 2016 Rio de Janeiro	Athletics	Women's javelin throw F13
Gold	Sherzod Namozov	(Brazil) 2016 Rio de Janeiro	Judo	Men -60kg
Gold	Utkirjon Nigmatov	(Brazil) 2016 Rio de Janeiro	Judo	Men -66kg
Gold	Adiljan Tulendibaev	(Brazil) 2016 Rio de Janeiro	Judo	Men's +100 kg
Gold	Firdavsbek Musabekov	(Brazil) 2016 Rio de Janeiro	Swimming	Men's 100m breaststroke SB13
Gold	Fotimakhon Amilova	(Brazil) 2016 Rio de Janeiro	Swimming	Women's 100m breaststroke SB13
Silver	Safiya Burkhanova	(Brazil) 2016 Rio de Janeiro	Athletics	Women's shot put F11/12
Silver	Khayitjon Alimova	(Brazil) 2016 Rio de Janeiro	Judo	Women's +70 kg
Silver	Kirill Pankov	(Brazil) 2016 Rio de Janeiro	Swimming	Men's 100m butterfly S13
Silver	Muslima Odilova	(Brazil) 2016 Rio de Janeiro	Swimming	Women's 50m freestyle S13
Silver	Muslima Odilova	(Brazil) 2016 Rio de Janeiro	Swimming	Women's 100m butterfly S13
Silver	Fotimakhon Amilova	(Brazil) 2016 Rio de Janeiro	Swimming	Women's 200m individual medley SM13
Bronze	Mansur Abdirashidov; Fakhriddin Khamraev; Miran Sakhatov; Doniyor Saliev	(Brazil) 2016 Rio de Janeiro	Athletics	Men's 4 × 100 m relay T11-13
Bronze	Doniyor Saliev	(Brazil) 2016 Rio de Janeiro	Athletics	Men's long jump T12
Bronze	Khusniddin Norbekov	(Brazil) 2016 Rio de Janeiro	Athletics	Men's shot put F37
Bronze	Feruz Sayidov	(Brazil) 2016 Rio de Janeiro	Judo	Men's -73 kg
Bronze	Shukhrat Boboev	(Brazil) 2016 Rio de Janeiro	Judo	Men's -90 kg
Bronze	Shirin Sharipov	(Brazil) 2016 Rio de Janeiro	Judo	Men's -100 kg
Bronze	Gulruh Rahimova	(Brazil) 2016 Rio de Janeiro	Judo	Women's -70 kg
Bronze	Akhror Bozorov	(Brazil) 2016 Rio de Janeiro	Powerlifting	Men's -80 kg
Bronze	Server Ibragimov	(Brazil) 2016 Rio de Janeiro	Shooting	Men's 10m air pistol SH1
Bronze	Muzaffar Tursunkhujaev	(Brazil) 2016 Rio de Janeiro	Swimming	Men's 50m freestyle S13
Bronze	Dmitriy Horlin	(Brazil) 2016 Rio de Janeiro	Swimming	Men's 400m freestyle S13
Bronze	Muzaffar Tursunkhujaev	(Brazil) 2016 Rio de Janeiro	Swimming	Men's 100m butterfly S13
Bronze	Shokhsanamkhon Toshpulatova	(Brazil) 2016 Rio de Janeiro	Swimming	Women's 50m freestyle S13
Bronze	Fotimakhon Amilova	(Brazil) 2016 Rio de Janeiro	Swimming	Women's 100m butterfly S13
Bronze	Shokhsanamkhon Toshpulatova	(Brazil) 2016 Rio de Janeiro	Swimming	Women's 200m individual medley SM13

=== 2020 ===
Medal	Name	Sport	Event	Date
Gold	Uchkun Kuranbaev	Judo	Men's 66 kg	27 August
Gold	Nozimakhon Kayumova	Athletics	Women's javelin throw F13	28 August
Gold	Mokhigul Khamdamova	Athletics	Women's discus throw F57	28 August
Gold	Feruz Sayidov	Judo	Men's 73 kg	28 August
Gold	Bobirjon Omonov	Athletics	Men's shot put F41	30 August
Gold	Khusniddin Norbekov	Athletics	Men's shot put F35	2 September
Gold	Safiya Burkhanova	Athletics	Women's shot put F12	3 September
Gold	Guljonoy Naimova	Taekwondo	Women's +58kg	4 September
Silver	Asila Mirzayorova	Athletics	Women's long jump T11	27 August
Silver	Ruza Kuzieva	Powerlifting	Women's 61 kg	28 August
Silver	Parvina Samandarova	Judo	Women's 57 kg	28 August
Silver	Davurkhon Karomatov	Judo	Men's 81 kg	28 August
Silver	Nurkhon Kurbanova	Athletics	Women's javelin throw F54	4 September
Bronze	Islam Aslanov	Swimming	Men's 100 metre butterfly S13	25 August
Bronze	Elbek Sultonov	Athletics	Men's shot put F12	28 August
Bronze	Nafisa Sheripboeva	Judo	Women's 63 kg	28 August
Bronze	Sharif Khalilov	Judo	Men's 100 kg	29 August
Bronze	Nurkhon Kurbanova	Athletics	Women's shot put F54	30 August
Bronze	Shokhsanamkhon Toshpulatova	Swimming	Women's 200 metre individual medley SM13	30 August

== See also ==
- Uzbekistan at the Olympics
- Uzbekistan at the Asian Games
- Uzbekistan at the Asian Para Games
- Uzbekistan at the Asian Youth Para Games
- Uzbekistan at the 2022 Asian Para Games
- Uzbekistan at the 2018 Asian Para Games
- Uzbekistan at the 2014 Asian Para Games
- Uzbekistan at the 2010 Asian Para Games
- National Paralympic Committee of Uzbekistan
- Uzbekistan at the Deaflympics
- Sport in Uzbekistan
