= Judo at the 2016 Summer Paralympics – Men's 100 kg =

Judo competition

Judo – Men's - 100 kg at the XV Paralympic Games
- Venue: Carioca Arena 3
- Date: 10 September 2016
- Competitors: 12 from 12 nations

Medalists
1st place, gold medalist(s)		Choi Gwang-geun	South Korea
2nd place, silver medalist(s)		Antônio Tenório Silva	Brazil
3rd place, bronze medalist(s)		Yordani Fernandez Sastre	Cuba
3rd place, bronze medalist(s)		Shirin Sharipov	Uzbekistan

The men's 100 kg judo competition at the 2016 Summer Paralympics was held on 10 September at Carioca Arena 3.

== Results ==
Round of 16
Theoklitos Papachristos (GRE)	000
Ibrahim Bolukbasi (TUR)	100
Antônio Tenório Silva (BRA)	100
Oliver Upmann (GER)	000
Oleksandr Pominov (UKR)	000
Kanan Abdullakhanli (AZE)	101
Myles Porter (USA)	000
Hamed Alizadeh (IRI)	110

Quarterfinals
Shirin Sharipov (UZB)	100
Ibrahim Bolukbasi (TUR)	000
Chris Skelley (GBR)	000^{3}
Antônio Tenório Silva (BRA)	000^{2}
Choi Gwang-geun (KOR)	101
Kanan Abdullakhanli (AZE)	000
Yordani Fernandez Sastre (CUB)	011
Hamed Alizadeh (IRI)	000

Semifinals
Shirin Sharipov (UZB)	000
Antônio Tenório Silva (BRA)	001
Choi Gwang-geun (KOR)	100
Yordani Fernandez Sastre (CUB)	000

Final
Antônio Tenório Silva (BRA)	000
Choi Gwang-geun (KOR)	100

=== Repechage ===
Repechage
Oliver Upmann (GER)	000
Chris Skelley (GBR)	100

Repechage Finals
Ibrahim Bolukbasi (TUR)	000^{2}
Chris Skelley (GBR)	000^{1}
Kanan Abdullakhanli (AZE)	000^{1}
Hamed Alizadeh (IRI)	000^{2}

Bronze Medal Matches
Chris Skelley (GBR)	000
Yordani Fernandez Sastre (CUB)	003
Kanan Abdullakhanli (AZE)	000
Shirin Sharipov (UZB)	001
