= Uzbekistan at the 2012 Summer Paralympics =

- IPC code: UZB
- NPC: Uzbekistan National Paralympic Association

in London
- Competitors: 10 in 4 sports
- Medals Ranked 67th: Gold 0 Silver 1 Bronze 0 Total 1

Summer Paralympics appearances (overview)
- 2004; 2008; 2012; 2016; 2020; 2024

Other related appearances
- Soviet Union (1988); Unified Team (1992)

Uzbekistan competed at the 2012 Summer Paralympics in London, United Kingdom from August 29 to September 9, 2012.

== Medallists ==
Medal	Name	Sport	Event	Date
Silver	Sharif Khalilov	Judo	Men's -73kg	31 August

== Athletics ==
Men's Field Events

Athlete	Event	Distance	Points	Rank
Ravil Diganshin	Shot Put F46	12.44	—N/a	9
Khusniddin Norbekov	Shot Put F37-38	13.03	—N/a	11
Khusniddin Norbekov	Discus Throw F37-38	52.05	997	4
Ivan Panafidin	Shot Put F37-38	9.76	—N/a	12
Miran Sahatov	Triple Jump F11	11.07	—N/a	8
Doniyor Saliev	Triple Jump F12	13.81	—N/a	7

Women's Track and Road Events

Athlete	Event	Heat		Semifinal		Final	
Athlete	Event	Result	Rank	Result	Rank	Result	Rank
Miyassar Ibragimova	100m T12	12.80	3 q	12.87	3	did not advance	

== Judo ==
Athlete	Event	Round of 16	Quarterfinals	Semifinals	First Repechage Round	Repechage Semifinals	Final	
Athlete	Event	Opposition Result	Opposition Result	Opposition Result	Opposition Result	Opposition Result	Opposition Result	Rank
Sharif Khalilov	Men's -73kg	Briceno (VEN); W 110–000	Ramirez (ARG); W 100–000	Kurbanov (RUS); W 100–000	Bye		Solovey (UKR); L 000–100	2nd place, silver medalist(s)

== Powerlifting ==
Men

Athlete	Event	Result	Rank
Yashin Shoberdiev	-48kg	NMR	

Women

Athlete	Event	Result	Rank
Elena Abasova	-56kg	NMR	

== Swimming ==
Men

Athletes	Event	Heat		Final	
Athletes	Event	Time	Rank	Time	Rank
Kirill Pankov	100m backstroke S13	1:07.77	12	did not advance	
Kirill Pankov	100m butterfly S13	59.62	6 Q	59.37	6

== See also ==
- Uzbekistan at the 2012 Summer Olympics
