= Judo at the 2020 Summer Paralympics – Men's 81 kg =

Judo – Men's 81 kg at the XVI Paralympic Games
- Venue: Nippon Budokan
- Date: 28 August 2021
- Competitors: 11 from 11 nations

Medalists
1st place, gold medalist(s)		Huseyn Rahimli	Azerbaijan
2nd place, silver medalist(s)		Davurkhon Karomatov	Uzbekistan
3rd place, bronze medalist(s)		Eduardo Ávila	Mexico
3rd place, bronze medalist(s)		Lee Jung-min	South Korea

The men's 81 kg judo competition at the 2020 Summer Paralympics was held on 28 August 2021 at the Nippon Budokan.

Japan's Aramitsu Kitazono was scheduled to compete in the round of 16 event of the men's 81 kg category. However, he was forced to withdraw at the last minute two days before his scheduled event after sustaining injuries to his head and legs during an accident which happened on 26 August 2021 at the Paralympics athletes village. It was revealed that Aramitsu was hit by an e-Pallette driverless vehicle when he was walking on the Pedestrian crossing and the vehicle was blamed for its technical fault. His opponent Dmytro Solovey of Ukraine automatically qualified to the quarterfinals as a result of Aramitsu's late withdrawal.

== Results ==
=== Bracket ===
Round of 16
Nathan Petit (FRA)	10
Galymzhan Smagululy (KAZ)	00
Daniel Powell (GBR)	10
Harlley Pereira (BRA)	01
~~Aramitsu Kitazono (JPN)~~
Dmytro Solovey (UKR)	Bye
Freed Villalobos (PER)	00
Gerardo Rodríguez (CUB)	10

Quarterfinals
Lee Jung-min (KOR)	10
Nathan Petit (FRA)	00
Huseyn Rahimli (AZE)	11
Daniel Powell (GBR)	00
Eduardo Ávila (MEX)	10
Dmytro Solovey (UKR)	00
Davurkhon Karomatov (UZB)	10
Gerardo Rodríguez (CUB)	00

Semifinals
Lee Jung-min (KOR)	00
Huseyn Rahimli (AZE)	10
Eduardo Ávila (MEX)	00
Davurkhon Karomatov (UZB)	01

Final
Huseyn Rahimli (AZE)	11
Davurkhon Karomatov (UZB)	01

=== Repechage ===
Repechage
Nathan Petit (FRA)	10
Daniel Powell (GBR)	00

Bronze medal
Nathan Petit (FRA)	01
Eduardo Ávila (MEX)	10

Repechage
Dmytro Solovey (UKR)	01
Gerardo Rodríguez (CUB)	00

Bronze medal
Dmytro Solovey (UKR)	00
Lee Jung-min (KOR)	10
