= Judo at the 2012 Summer Paralympics – Men's 81 kg =

Judo competition

Judo – Men's 81 kg at the XIV Paralympic Games
- Venue: ExCeL London
- Date: 31 August 2012
- Competitors: 8 from 8 nations

Medalists
1st place, gold medalist(s)		Olexandr Kosinov	Ukraine
2nd place, silver medalist(s)		Jose Effron	Argentina
3rd place, bronze medalist(s)		Isao Cruz Alonso	Cuba
3rd place, bronze medalist(s)		Matthias Krieger	Germany

The men's 81 kg judo competition at the 2012 Summer Paralympics was held on 31 August at ExCeL London.

== Results ==
Semifinals
1	O Kosinov (UKR)	0212
4	M Krieger (GER)	0013
3	A Vazquez Cortijo (ESP)	000
2	J Effron (ARG)	020

Final
O Kosinov (UKR)	0122
J Effron (ARG)	0112

=== Table A ===
Preliminaries
R Safarov (AZE)	000
I Cruz Alonso (CUB)	0201
D Powell (GBR)	0003
M Krieger (GER)	1121

Quarterfinals
I Cruz Alonso (CUB)	002
O Kosinov (UKR)	0102
H Pereira (BRA)	0101
M Krieger (GER)	100

Semifinals
O Kosinov (UKR)	0212
M Krieger (GER)	0013

=== Table B ===
Preliminaries
A Shevchenko (RUS)	002
Y Kato (JPN)	0002
Y Cimciler (TUR)	0001
SA M-Nattajsolhdar (IRI)	020

Quarterfinals
A Vazquez Cortijo (ESP)	100
A Shevchenko (RUS)	002
J Effron (ARG)	0112
SA M-Nattajsolhdar (IRI)	0012

Semifinals
A Vazquez Cortijo (ESP)	000
J Effron (ARG)	020

=== Bronze Medal Contests A ===
Repechage Contest		Finals of Repechage A		Bronze Medal Contests
		I Cruz Alonso (CUB)	100
D Powell (GBR)	1001	D Powell (GBR)	000
H Pereira (BRA)	000H			I Cruz Alonso (CUB)	0102
				A Vazquez Cortijo (ESP)	0013

=== Bronze Medal Contests B ===
Finals of Repechage B		Bronze Medal Contests
A Shevchenko (RUS)	010
SA Mirhassan Nattajsolhdar (IRI)	0003	A Shevchenko (RUS)	001
		M Krieger (GER)	111
