= Judo at the 2016 Summer Paralympics – Men's 81 kg =

Judo competition

Judo – Men's 81 kg at the XV Paralympic Games
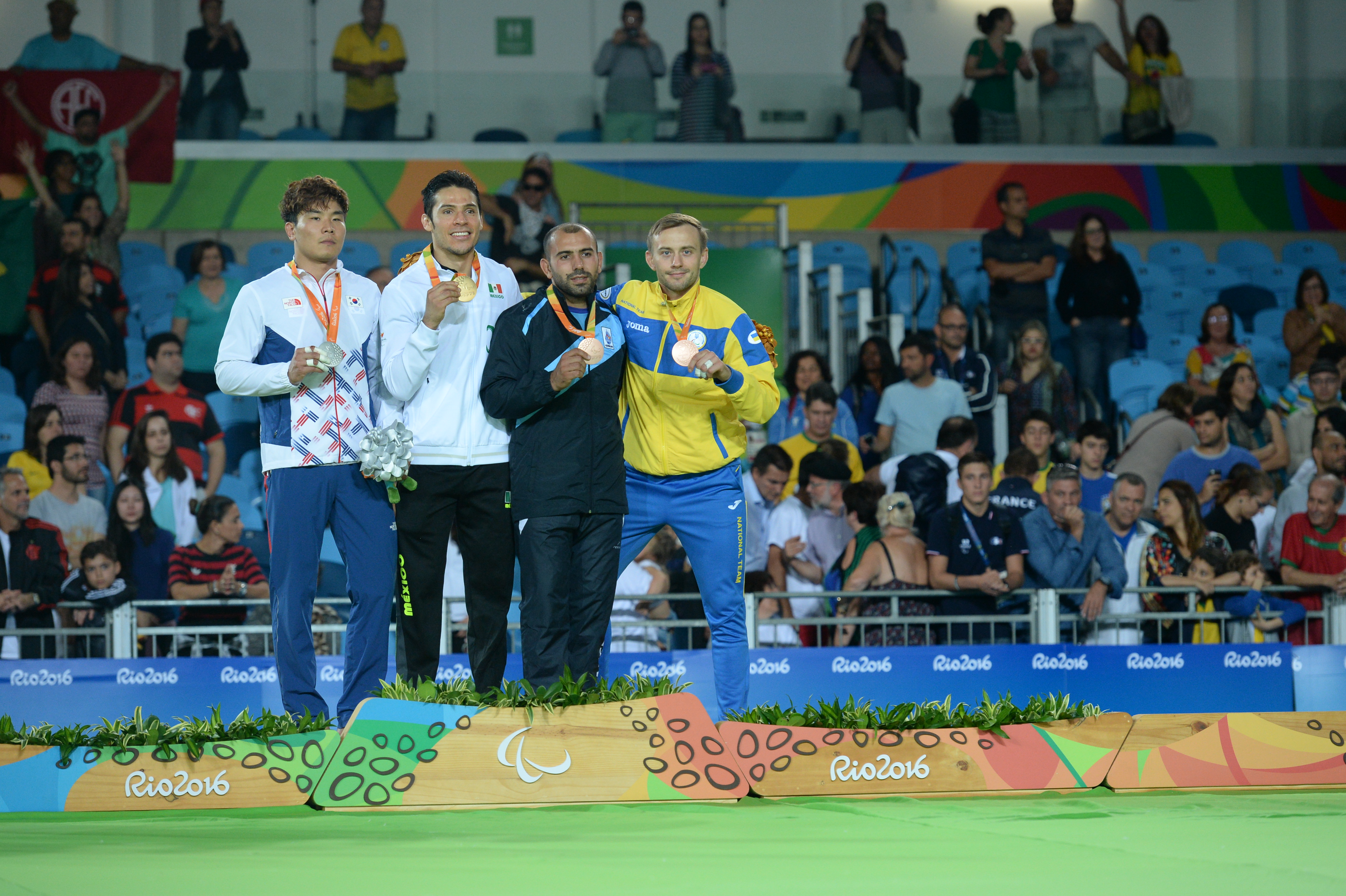
- Awarding ceremony
- Venue: Carioca Arena 3
- Date: 9 September 2016
- Competitors: 12 from 12 nations

Medalists
1st place, gold medalist(s)		Eduardo Avila Sanchez	Mexico
2nd place, silver medalist(s)		Lee Jung-min	South Korea
3rd place, bronze medalist(s)		Rovshan Safarov	Azerbaijan
3rd place, bronze medalist(s)		Olexandr Kosinov	Ukraine

The men's 81 kg judo competition at the 2016 Summer Paralympics was held on 9 September at Carioca Arena 3.

== Results ==
Round of 16
Rovshan Safarov (AZE)	110
Aliaksandr Kazlou (BLR)	000
Harlley Pereira (BRA)	000
Jose Effron (ARG)	112
Sharif Khalilov (UZB)	000^{3}
Jonathan Drane (GBR)	000
Sebastian Junk (GER)	000
Seyed Omid Nouri Jafari (IRI)	111

Quarterfinals
Olexandr Kosinov (UKR)	110
Rovshan Safarov (AZE)	000
Eduardo Avila Sanchez (MEX)	101
Jose Effron (ARG)	000
Cyril Jonard (FRA)	000
Jonathan Drane (GBR)	002
Lee Jung-min (KOR)	000^{2}
Seyed Omid Nouri Jafari (IRI)	000^{3}

Semifinals
Olexandr Kosinov (UKR)	000
Eduardo Avila Sanchez (MEX)	002
Jonathan Drane (GBR)	000
Lee Jung-min (KOR)	100

Final
Eduardo Avila Sanchez (MEX)	001
Lee Jung-min (KOR)	000

=== Repechage ===
Repechage
Sharif Khalilov (UZB)	100
Cyril Jonard (FRA)	000

Repechage Finals
Sharif Khalilov (UZB)	002
Seyed Omid Nouri Jafari (IRI)	011
Rovshan Safarov (AZE)	100
Jose Effron (ARG)	000

Bronze Medal Matches
Seyed Omid Nouri Jafari (IRI)	000
Olexandr Kosinov (UKR)	100
Rovshan Safarov (AZE)	102
Jonathan Drane (GBR)	000
