= Judo at the 2008 Summer Paralympics – Men's 73 kg =

Judo competition

Judo - Men's 73 kg at the XIII Paralympic Games
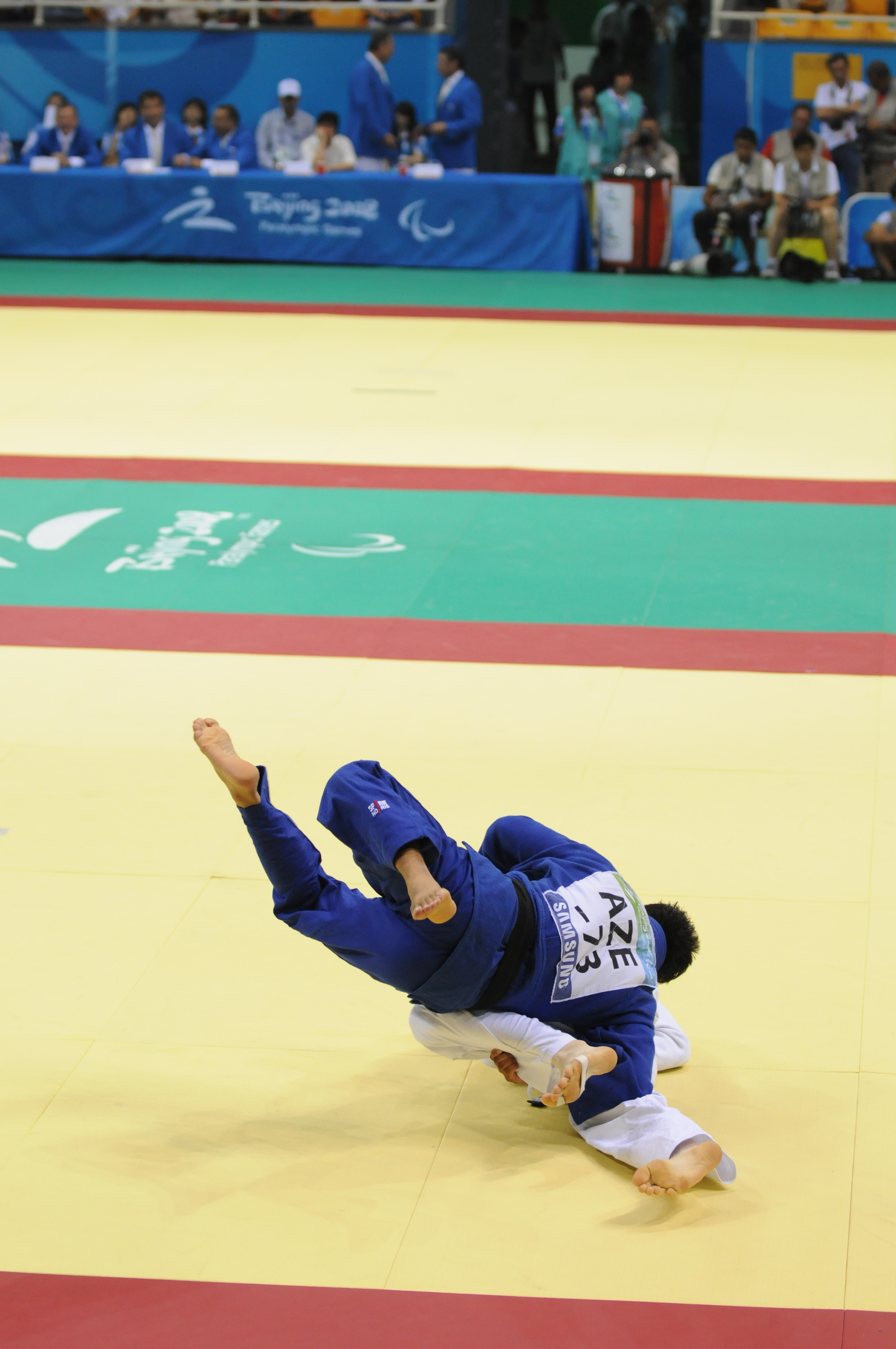
- Ramin Aliyev (AZE) competing
- Venue: Beijing Workers' Gymnasium
- Date: 8 September 2008
- Competitors: 12 from 12 nations

Medalists
1st place, gold medalist(s)		Eduardo Ávila Sánchez	Mexico
2nd place, silver medalist(s)		Xu Zhilin	China
3rd place, bronze medalist(s)		Fabian Ramirez	Argentina
3rd place, bronze medalist(s)		Sergii Sydorenko	Ukraine

The men's 73 kg judo competition at the 2008 Summer Paralympics was held on 8 September at the Beijing Workers' Gymnasium.

This event was the third-lightest of the men's judo weight classes, limiting competitors to a maximum of 73 kilograms of body mass. Like all other judo events, bouts lasted five minutes. If the bout was still tied at the end, it was extended for another five-minute, sudden-death period; if neither judoka scored during that period, the match is decided by the judges. The tournament bracket consisted of a single-elimination contest culminating in a gold medal match. There was also a repechage to determine the winners of the two bronze medals. Each judoka who had lost to a semifinalist competed in the repechage. The two judokas who lost in the semifinals faced the winner of the opposite half of the bracket's repechage in bronze medal bouts.

== Final ranking ==
Rank	Name
Gold medal	Eduardo Ávila Sánchez (MEX)
Silver medal	Xu Zhilin (CHN)
Bronze medal	Fabian Ramirez (ARG)
Bronze medal	Sergii Sydorenko (UKR)
5	Matthias Krieger (GER)
5	Jorge Hierrezuelo (CUB)
7	Ramin Aliyev (AZE)
7	Mousa Pourabbas (IRI)

== Tournament results ==
First Round
Ramin Aliyev (AZE)	1001
Takayuki Kimura (JPN)	0000
Kaspars Biezais (LAT)	0000^{1}
Matthias Krieger (GER)	1001
Shakhban Kurbanov (RUS)	0001^{1}
Jorge Hierrezuelo (CUB)	1012^{1}
Rauno Peltoniemi (FIN)	0000
Mousa Pourabbas (IRI)	1011

Quarterfinals
Xu Zhilin (CHN)	1001
Ramin Aliyev (AZE)	0000^{1}
Sergii Sydorenko (UKR)	0013
Matthias Krieger (GER)	0000^{1}
Eduardo Ávila Sánchez (MEX)	0020
Jorge Hierrezuelo (CUB)	0000
Fabian Ramirez (ARG)	0010
Mousa Pourabbas (IRI)	0000

Semifinals
Xu Zhilin (CHN)	0020
Sergii Sydorenko (UKR)	0000^{2}
Eduardo Ávila Sánchez (MEX)	1100
Fabian Ramirez (ARG)	0000

Final
Xu Zhilin (CHN)	0000
Eduardo Ávila Sánchez (MEX)	1000

=== Repechage ===
Round 1
Ramin Aliyev (AZE)	0011^{2}
Matthias Krieger (GER)	0110^{1}
Jorge Hierrezuelo (CUB)	1011
Mousa Pourabbas (IRI)	0000^{1}

Bronze medal finals
Matthias Krieger (GER)	0000
Fabian Ramirez (ARG)	1000
Jorge Hierrezuelo (CUB)
Sergii Sydorenko (UKR)	Hantei (decision)
