= Uzbekistan at the 2026 Winter Paralympics =

- Flag of Uzbekistan
- IPC code: UZB
- NPC: Uzbekistan National Paralympic Association

in Milan & Cortina d'Ampezzo, Italy 6 March 2026 – 15 March 2026
- Competitors: 2 (1 man and 1 woman) in 1 sport
- Flag bearers (opening): Yulduz Makhmudova & Firdavs Khuddoyatov
- Flag bearer (closing): Volunteer
- Medals: Gold 0 Silver 0 Bronze 0 Total 0

Winter Paralympics appearances (overview)
- 2014; 2018; 2022; 2026

Other related appearances
- Soviet Union (1988); Unified Team (1992)

Uzbekistan will compete at the 2026 Winter Paralympics in Milan & Cortina d'Ampezzo, Italy, which will take place between 6–15 March 2026.

== Competitors ==
The following is the list of number of competitors participating at the Games per sport/discipline.

Sport	Men	Women	Total
Para alpine skiing	1	1	1
Total	1	1	2

== Para alpine skiing ==
Athlete	Class	Event	Run 1		Run 2		Total	
Athlete	Class	Event	Time	Rank	Time	Rank	Time	Rank
Firdavs Khudoyatov	LW4	Men's giant slalom, standing	1:32.12	31	1:35.20	31	3:07.32	29
Yulduz Makhmudova	LW2	Women's giant slalom, standing	1:46.64	20	1:47.77	17	3:34.41	17

== See also ==
- Uzbekistan at the Paralympics
- Uzbekistan at the 2026 Winter Olympics
