= Aramitsu Kitazono =

Japanese judoka (born 1991)

Personal information
- Nationality: Japanese
- Born: 17 February 1991 (age 35) Kobe, Japan
- Occupation: Judoka

Sport
- Sport: Para judo
- Disability: Visually impaired
- Event: 81kg
Medal record
Men's paralympic judo
Representing Japan
Asian Para Games
Silver medal – second place	2014 Incheon	90kg
Bronze medal – third place	2018 Jakarta	81kg

Aramitsu Kitazono (born 17 February 1991) is a Japanese visually impaired Paralympic judoka. He made his first Paralympic appearance during the 2012 Summer Paralympics. He was set to represent Japan at the 2020 Summer Paralympics in the judoka competition but had to withdraw from the event after being hit by a self driving bus.

== Career ==
He represented Japan at the 2012 Summer Paralympics which was his first Paralympic appearance and competed in men's 100kg event. He also represented Japan at the 2016 Summer Paralympics and took part in the men's 73kg event. He claimed a bronze medal in the men's 81kg event at the 2018 Asian Para Games which was held in Jakarta.

=== 2020 Tokyo Paralympics ===
He was scheduled to compete in the round of 16 event of the men's 81kg category at the 2020 Summer Olympics on 28 August 2021 and it would have been his third Paralympic appearance for Japan. However, he was forced to withdraw at the last minute two days before his scheduled event after sustaining injuries to his head and legs during an accident which happened on 26 August 2021 at the Paralympics athletes village. It was revealed that Aramitsu was hit by a Toyota e-Palette driverless vehicle when he was walking on a pedestrian crossing and the vehicle was blamed for its technical fault.

According to reports, the driverless vehicle which caused the accident had been operated by Toyota and the accident prompted the company to temporarily suspend the e-Palette driverless vehicle service. According to the Tokyo Metropolitan Police Department, he needs to rest for at least two weeks in order to recover from the injuries. President of Toyota, Akio Toyoda, personally intervened into the matter and apologised to Aramitsu stating that there had been overconfidence in the technology of autonomous driving. His opponent Dmytro Solovey of Ukraine automatically qualified to the quarterfinals as a result of Aramitsu's late withdrawal.
