= Judo at the 2020 Summer Paralympics – Men's 100 kg =

Judo – Men's 100 kg at the XVI Paralympic Games
- Venue: Nippon Budokan
- Date: 29 August 2021
- Competitors: 10 from 10 nations

Medalists
1st place, gold medalist(s)		Chris Skelley	Great Britain
2nd place, silver medalist(s)		Ben Goodrich	United States
3rd place, bronze medalist(s)		Sharif Khalilov	Uzbekistan
3rd place, bronze medalist(s)		Anatoliy Shevchenko	RPC

The men's 100 kg judo competition at the 2020 Summer Paralympics was held on 29 August 2021 at the Nippon Budokan.

== Results ==
=== Bracket ===
Round of 16
Kanan Abdullakhanli (AZE)	00
Sharif Khalilov (UZB)	10
Ion Basoc (MDA)	01
Yerlan Utepov (KAZ)	00

Quarterfinals
Chris Skelley (GBR)	10
Sharif Khalilov (UZB)	00
Oliver Upmann (GER)	10
Yoshikazu Matsumoto (JPN)	00
Antônio Tenório Silva (BRA)	10
Ion Basoc (MDA)	00
Ben Goodrich (USA)	01
Anatoliy Shevchenko (RPC)	00

Semifinals
Chris Skelley (GBR)	11
Oliver Upmann (GER)	00
Antônio Tenório Silva (BRA)	00
Ben Goodrich (USA)	10

Final
Chris Skelley (GBR)	01
Ben Goodrich (USA)	00

=== Repechage ===
Repechage
Sharif Khalilov (UZB)	10
Yoshikazu Matsumoto (JPN)	00

Bronze medal
Sharif Khalilov (UZB)	10
Antônio Tenório Silva (BRA)	01

Repechage
Ion Basoc (MDA)	00
Anatoliy Shevchenko (RPC)	10

Bronze medal
Anatoliy Shevchenko (RPC)	11
Oliver Upmann (GER)	00
