= Uzbekistan at the 2014 Winter Paralympics =

- IPC code: UZB
- NPC: Uzbekistan National Paralympic Association

in Sochi
- Competitors: 2 in 1 sport
- Flag bearer: Ramil Gayazov
- Medals: Gold 0 Silver 0 Bronze 0 Total 0

Winter Paralympics appearances (overview)
- 2014; 2018; 2022; 2026

Other related appearances
- Soviet Union (1988); Unified Team (1992)

Uzbekistan sent a delegation to compete at the 2014 Winter Paralympics in Sochi, Russia, held between 7–16 March 2014. This marked the first time the nation competed at the Winter Paralympics. The delegation consisted of two athletes, Yevgeniy Slepov and Ramil Gayazov, both were competitors in Alpine skiing. Gayazov failed to post an event finish, while Slepov finished 32nd in the snowboard cross.

== Background ==
Uzbekistan has competed independently at every Summer Olympics since the 1996 Summer Olympics in Athens, and in every Winter Olympic Games since the 1994 Lillehammer Games, as of the conclusion of the 2018 Winter Olympics. Uzbekistan began participating in the Summer Paralympics in the 2004 edition, but Sochi marked their first delegation sent to a Winter Paralympics. Ramil Gayazov was chosen as the Uzbekistani flag-bearer for the parade of nations during the opening ceremony, and for the closing ceremony.

== Disability classification ==
Every participant at the Paralympics has their disability grouped into one of five disability categories; amputation, the condition may be congenital or sustained through injury or illness; cerebral palsy; wheelchair athletes, there is often overlap between this and other categories; visual impairment, including blindness; Les autres, any physical disability that does not fall strictly under one of the other categories, for example dwarfism or multiple sclerosis. Each Paralympic sport then has its own classifications, dependent upon the specific physical demands of competition. Events are given a code, made of numbers and letters, describing the type of event and classification of the athletes competing. Events with "B" in the code are for athletes with visual impairment, codes LW1 to LW9 are for athletes who stand to compete and LW10 to LW12 are for athletes who compete sitting down. Alpine skiing events grouped athletes into separate competitions for sitting, standing and visually impaired athletes.

== Alpine skiing ==
Ramil Gayazov was 28 at the time of these Games, who competed in the standing category of events. On 13 March 2014, he was disqualified during the first run of the slalom for missing a gate. Two days later, despite being entered into the giant slalom, he failed to start the race for unknown reasons.

Men

Athlete	Event	Run 1			Run 2			Final/Total		
Athlete	Event	Time	Diff	Rank	Time	Diff	Rank	Time	Diff	Rank
Ramil Gayazov	Slalom, standing	DSQ								
Ramil Gayazov	Giant slalom, standing	DNS								

=== Snowboarding ===
For the 2014 Winter Paralympics, snowboard cross was considered a discipline of Alpine skiing, rather than a separate sport. Snowboarding was offered only for athletes who competed in a standing position. The men's snowboard cross event was held on 14 March 2014. Yevgeniy Slepov posted his two best times on runs 1 and 3, and only the two best times of each athlete counted towards the final result. Slepov finished with a combined time of three minutes and two seconds, over a minute off the winning time of one minute and forty-three seconds. He finished in 32nd place out of 33 competitors.

Men

Athlete	Event	Race 1		Race 2		Race 3		Total	
Athlete	Event	Time	Rank	Time	Rank	Time	Rank	Time	Rank
Yevgeniy Slepov	Snowboard cross	1:33.45	28	1:41.39	31	1:28.68	28	3:02.13	32

== See also ==
- Uzbekistan at the Paralympics
- Uzbekistan at the 2014 Winter Olympics
