= Kanan Abdullakhanli =

Azerbaijani Paralympic judoka (1987)

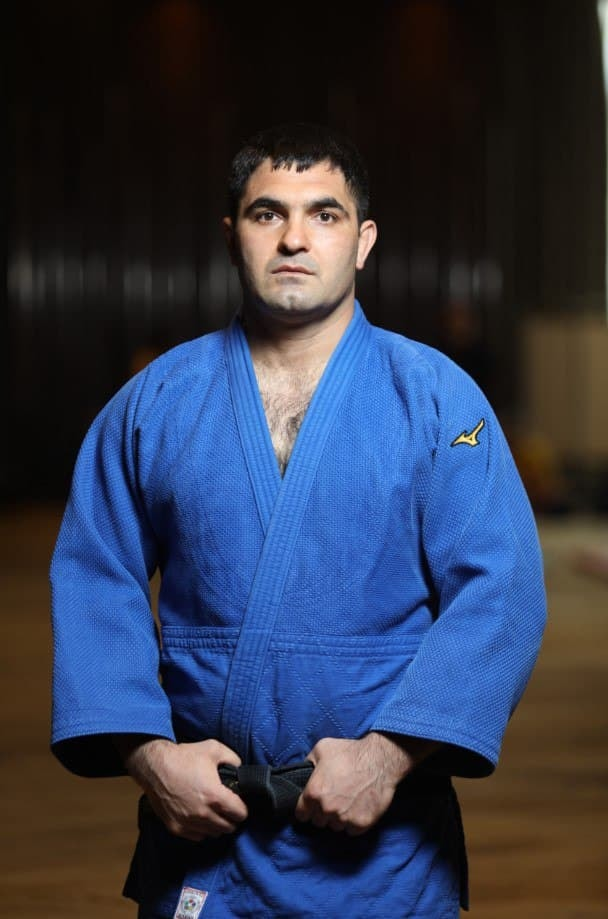
- Abdullakhanli in 2021

Personal information
- Native name: Kənan Abdullaxanlı
- Born: 2 July 1987 (age 38)
- Occupation: Judoka

Sport
- Country: Azerbaijan
- Sport: Judo
- Weight class: ‍–‍100 kg
Medal record
Representing Azerbaijan
Islamic Solidarity Games
Silver medal – second place	2017 Baku	+100 kg

Profile at external databases
- IJF: 31963
- JudoInside.com: 83845

Kanan Latif oglu Abdullakhanli (Azerbaijani: Kənan Lətif oğlu Abdullaxanlı; born 2 July 1987) is an Azerbaijani Paralympic judoka who competes in the under 100 kg weight class and J2 visual impairment category. He participated in the 2016 Summer Paralympics in Rio de Janeiro and the 2020 Summer Paralympics in Tokyo. Abdullakhanli is the 2022 World Champion in blind and visually impaired judo in the team event, a bronze medalist at the 2018 World Championship, and the winner of the 2021 Warwick Grand Prix.

== Biography ==
Kanan Abdullakhanli was born on July 2, 1987. In 2002, he graduated from the Republican Olympic Sports Lyceum.

In October 2015, Abdullakhanli won a bronze medal at the European Championship in Odivelash.

In September 2016, Abdullakhanli represented Azerbaijan at the 2016 Summer Paralympics in Rio de Janeiro in the under 100 kg weight category. In his first match, he defeated Oleksandr Pominov from Ukraine by ippon. However, in the quarterfinals, he lost to Choi Gwang-geun from South Korea by ippon. In the first consolation fight, Abdullakhanli won against Hamed Alizadeh from Iran, but in the bronze medal match, he was defeated by Shirin Sharipov from Uzbekistan.

In May 2017, at the Islamic Solidarity Games in Baku, Azerbaijan, Kanan Abdullakhanli won a silver medal in the over 100 kg weight category, in the final again losing to Shirin Sharipov.

In April 2018, he placed third at the World Cup in Antalya, Turkey. In November of the same year, Abdullakhanli won a bronze medal in the team event at the World Championship for the blind and visually impaired in Portugal.

In May 2019, he placed 7th at the Grand Prix in Baku. In July 2019, Abdullakhanli won a bronze medal at the European Championship in Genoa, Italy, defeating Anatoly Shevchenko from Russia in the bronze medal match.

In August 2021, Kanan Abdullakhanli again participated in the Paralympic Games in Tokyo. In his opening match, he lost to Sharif Khalilov from Uzbekistan and was eliminated from the competition.

In September 2023, Abdullakhanli lost his match for third place at the home Grand Prix in Baku.
