= Uzbekistan at the 2008 Summer Paralympics =

- IPC code: UZB
- NPC: Uzbekistan National Paralympic Association

in Beijing
- Competitors: 2 in 2 sports
- Flag bearer: Ravil Diganshin
- Medals: Gold 0 Silver 0 Bronze 0 Total 0

Summer Paralympics appearances (overview)
- 2004; 2008; 2012; 2016; 2020; 2024

Other related appearances
- Soviet Union (1988); Unified Team (1992)

Uzbekistan sent a delegation to compete at the 2008 Summer Paralympics in Beijing, People's Republic of China.

== Sports ==
=== Powerlifting ===
Athlete	Event	Result	Rank
Ravil Diganshin	100kg	170.0	10

=== Swimming ===
Athlete	Class	Event	Heats		Final	
Athlete	Class	Event	Result	Rank	Result	Rank
Farhod Sayidov	S5	50m freestyle	1:07/53	12	did not advance	

== See also ==
- Uzbekistan at the Paralympics
- Uzbekistan at the 2008 Summer Olympics
