= Nikolai Kornhass =

German Paralympic judoka

Personal information
- Native name: Nikolai Kornhaß
- Born: 28 March 1993 (age 33)
- Occupation: Judoka

Sport
- Country: Germany
- Sport: Paralympic judo
Medal record
Paralympic Games
Bronze medal – third place	2016 Rio de Janeiro	73 kg

Profile at external databases
- JudoInside.com: 99792

Nikolai Kornhass (German: Nikolai Kornhaß, born 28 March 1993) is a German Paralympic judoka. He represented Germany at the 2016 Summer Paralympics held in Rio de Janeiro, Brazil and he won a bronze medal in the men's 73 kg event.

At the 2015 IBSA European Judo Championships he won a bronze medal in the men's 73 kg event.

He won the gold medal at the 2019 IBSA European Judo Championships in the men's 73 kg event.
