= Uzbekistan at the 2018 Winter Paralympics =

- IPC code: UZB
- NPC: Uzbekistan National Paralympic Association

in PyeongChang, South Korea
- Competitors: 1 in 1 sport
- Medals: Gold 0 Silver 0 Bronze 0 Total 0

Winter Paralympics appearances (overview)
- 2014; 2018; 2022; 2026

Other related appearances
- Soviet Union (1988); Unified Team (1992)

Uzbekistan sent competitors to the 2018 Winter Paralympics in Pyeongchang, South Korea. Only one skier from Uzbekistan was selected to go. Yokutkhon Kholbekova (Uzbek: Ёқутхон Холбекова) is going to compete in para-Nordic skiing. Saodat Numanova was selected to referee para-alpine skiing events. 2018 is the second time Uzbekistan will go to the Winter Paralympics.

== Team ==
Skiers from Uzbekistan were invited to compete at the 2018 Winter Paralympics. Yokutkhon Kholbekova (Uzbek: Ёқутхон Холбекова) was the only skier selected to go to South Korea. She competed in para-Nordic skiing. Saodat Numanova was selected to referee para-alpine skiing events.

The table below contains the list of members of people (called "Team Uzbekistan") that will be participating in the 2018 Games.

Team Uzbekistan
Name	Sport	Gender	Classification	Events	ref
Yokutkhon Kholbekova (Uzbek: Ёқутхон Холбекова)	para-Nordic skiing	female			

== History ==
Uzbekistan first went to the Winter Paralympic Games in 2014. They sent 2 sportspeople. Ramil Gayazov was the only one who competed. They did not win any medals.

== Para-Nordic skiing ==
=== Skiers ===
Yokutkhon Kholbekova went to a World Cup event in January 2018. She also competes in para-athletics events, participating in national championships in Uzbekistan.

=== Schedule and results ===
On 12 March, the 15 km race takes place, with standing and vision impaired women starting at 10:00 PM. Thee sprint classic qualification takes place on 14 March from 10:00 AM - 11:25 AM for both men and women in all classes. It is followed in the afternoon by the semifinals and finals. The classic race takes place on 17 March. The standing and visually impaired women's race takes place from 10:00 AM - 12:30.
