= Vladimir Fedin =

Russian Paralympic judoka

Personal information
- Occupation: Judoka

Sport
- Country: Russia
- Sport: Paralympic judo
Medal record
Paralympic Games
Bronze medal – third place	2012 London	100 kg

Vladimir Fedin is a Russian Paralympic judoka. He represented Russia at the 2012 Summer Paralympics held in London, United Kingdom and he won one of the bronze medals in the men's 100 kg event.
