= Ramil Gasimov =

Azerbaijani Olympic judoka (born 1981)

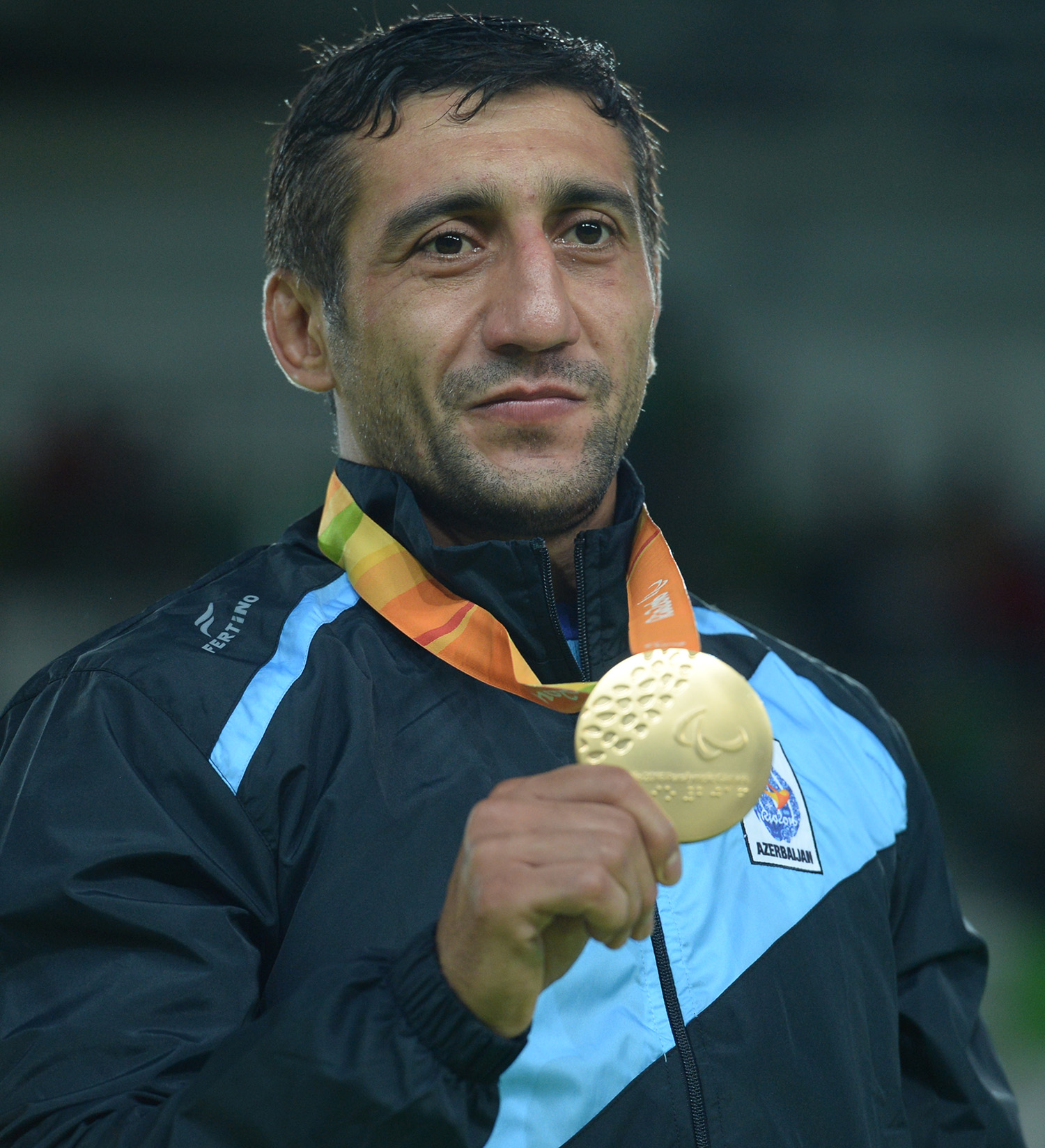
- Gasimov at the 2016 Summer Paralympics

Personal information
- Native name: Ramil Qasımov
- Citizenship: Azerbaijani
- Born: 13 August 1981 (age 44)
- Occupation: Judoka

Sport
- Country: Azerbaijan
- Sport: Judo, Paralympic judo
- Disability: Blind
- Disability class: B2
- Weight class: ‍–‍66 kg, ‍–‍73 kg

Achievements and titles
- Olympic Games: R32 (2008)
- Paralympic Games: (gold) (2016)
- European Champ.: 7th (2007, 2008)
Medal record
Representing Azerbaijan
Men's Paralympic judo
Paralympics Games
Gold medal – first place	2016 Rio de Janeiro	‍–‍73 kg
World Championships
Gold medal – first place	2014 Colorado Springs	‍–‍73 kg
Bronze medal – third place	2018 Lisbon	‍–‍73 kg
European Championships
Gold medal – first place	2013 Eger	‍–‍73 kg
Gold medal – first place	2015 Odivelas	‍–‍73 kg
Bronze medal – third place	2017 Walsall	‍–‍73 kg
Bronze medal – third place	2019 Genoa	‍–‍73 kg
Islamic Solidarity Games
Gold medal – first place	2017 Baku	‍–‍73 kg
Men's judo
IJF Grand Prix
Bronze medal – third place	2009 Hamburg	‍–‍66 kg
Summer Universiade
Gold medal – first place	2007 Bangkok	‍–‍66 kg

Profile at external databases
- IJF: 2417
- JudoInside.com: 20283
- Updated on 3 January 2023

Ramil Gasimov (Azerbaijani: Ramil Qasımov, born 13 August 1981) is an Azerbaijani paralympic judoka, competing in a weight up to 73 kilograms and category B2 blindness, world champion in 2014 and two-time European champion in 2013 and 2015. The winner of the 2007 Summer Universiade in Bangkok. He took part in the 2008 Summer Olympics in Beijing. Representing Azerbaijan at the 2016 Summer Paralympics in Rio de Janeiro, which won the gold medal.
