= Judo at the 2016 Summer Paralympics – Men's 73 kg =

Judo competition

Judo – Men's 73 kg at the XV Paralympic Games
- Venue: Carioca Arena 3
- Date: 9 September 2016
- Competitors: 12 from 12 nations

Medalists
1st place, gold medalist(s)		Ramil Gasimov	Azerbaijan
2nd place, silver medalist(s)		Dmytro Solovey	Ukraine
3rd place, bronze medalist(s)		Feruz Sayidov	Uzbekistan
3rd place, bronze medalist(s)		Nikolai Kornhass	Germany

The men's 73 kg judo competition at the 2016 Summer Paralympics was held on 9 September at Carioca Arena 3.

== Results ==
Round of 16
Gerardo Rodriguez (CUB)	100
Rodolfo Ramírez (ARG)	000
Mauricio Briceno (VEN)	100
Abner Nascimento De Oliveira (BRA)	000
Aramitsu Kitazono (JPN)	003
Kuralbay Orynbassar (KAZ)	000
Mehdi Meskine (ALG)	000
Alvaro Gavilan Lorenzo (ESP)	000^{2}

Quarterfinals
Ramil Gasimov (AZE)	000
Gerardo Rodriguez (CUB)	000^{3}
Nikolai Kornhass (GER)	000
Mauricio Briceno (VEN)	000^{1}
Dmytro Solovey (UKR)	102
Aramitsu Kitazono (JPN)	000
Feruz Sayidov (UZB)	111
Mehdi Meskine (ALG)	000

Semifinals
Ramil Gasimov (AZE)	100
Nikolai Kornhass (GER)	000
Dmytro Solovey (UKR)	000
Feruz Sayidov (UZB)	000^{3}

Final
Ramil Gasimov (AZE)	110
Dmytro Solovey (UKR)	000

=== Repechage ===
First round

Repechage Finals
Gerardo Rodriguez (CUB)	100
Mauricio Briceno (VEN)	000
Aramitsu Kitazono (JPN)	100
Mehdi Meskine (ALG)	000

Bronze Medal Matches
Gerardo Rodriguez (CUB)	010
Feruz Sayidov (UZB)	102
Aramitsu Kitazono (JPN)	000
Nikolai Kornhass (GER)	110
