= Judo at the 2012 Summer Paralympics – Men's 100 kg =

Judo competition

Judo – Men's 100 kg at the XIV Paralympic Games
- Venue: ExCeL London
- Date: 1 September 2012
- Competitors: 11 from 11 nations

Medalists
1st place, gold medalist(s)		Choi Gwang-geun	South Korea
2nd place, silver medalist(s)		Myles Porter	United States
3rd place, bronze medalist(s)		Antônio Tenório Silva	Brazil
3rd place, bronze medalist(s)		Vladimir Fedin	Russia

The men's 100 kg judo competition at the 2012 Summer Paralympics was held on 1 September at ExCeL London.

== Results ==
=== Gold Medal Contest ===
Semifinals
1	Vladimir Fedin (RUS)	0013
4	Myles Porter (USA)	0101
3	Hamed Alizadeh (IRI)	0001
2	Choi Gwang-geun (KOR)	100

Final
Myles Porter (USA)	0001
Choi Gwang-geun (KOR)	100

=== Bronze Medal Contest ===
==== Contest A ====
Repechage contest
S Srijarung (THA)	000
A Tenorio (BRA)	100

Finals of Repechage
A Tenorio (BRA)	0113
A Kitazono (JPN)	0103

Bronze Medal Contest
Antonio Tenorio (BRA)	1003
Hamed Alizadeh (IRI)	0104

==== Contest B ====
Finals of Repechage
O Upmann (GER)	100
J Ingram (GBR)	000

Bronze Medal Contest
O Upmann (GER)	000
Vladimir Fedin (RUS)	101

=== Table Contest ===
==== Table A ====
Preliminaries		Quarterfinals		Semifinals
		A Tenorio (BRA)	0002
S Srijarung (THA)	0002	V Fedin (RUS)	0011
V Fedin (RUS)	0001			V Fedin (RUS)	0013
A Kitazono (JPN)	100			M Porter (USA)	0101
J Cortada Bermudez (CUB)	0001	A Kitazono (JPN)	000
		M Porter (USA)	100

==== Table B ====
Preliminaries
O Upmann (GER)	100
K Sardarov (AZE)	000
J Ingram (GBR)	111
T Rees (CAN)	0001

Quarterfinals
O Upmann (GER)	0003
H Alizadeh (IRI)	010
J Ingram (GBR)	0011
G-G Choi (KOR)	0132

Semifinals
H Alizadeh (IRI)	0001
G-G Choi (KOR)	100
