= Abel Vázquez =

Spanish paralympic judoka

Personal information
- Full name: Abel Vázquez Cortijo
- Nationality: Spanish
- Born: 3 August 1989 (age 37)
- Occupation: Judoka

Sport
- Country: Spain
- Sport: Para judo

Profile at external databases
- JudoInside.com: 89879

Abel Vázquez Cortijo (Note: In this Spanish name, the first or paternal surname is Vázquez and the second or maternal family name is Cortijo.) (born 3 August 1989) is a judo athlete from Spain who represented Spain at the 2011 and 2013 IPC European Championships, and the 2008 and 2012 Summer Paralympics.

== Personal ==
Vázquez is vision-impaired. He is from Seville. He completed a Bachelor of Science in Physical Activity and Sport. In 2013, he was attending Pablo de Olavide University in Seville where he was working on completing a Masters of Teaching in Secondary Education.

== Judo ==
Vázquez won a bronze medal at the 2011 European Championships held in Crawley, England. In October 2011, he competed in a regional Spanish national vision impaired judo event in Guadalajara. In November 2013, he competed in the Open Judo Tournament Guadalajara. He competed in the 2013 IPC European Judo Championships held in early December in Eger, Hungary, winning a silver medal in the under-81kilogram group. He competed against Ukrainian Olexandr Kosinov for the bronze medal. The national team, coached by Vicente Arolas, treated the event as preparation for the 2016 Summer Paralympics. In 2013, he was one of seven Paralympic sportspeople awarded a 2013/2014 "Iberdrola Foundation Scholarship" by the Spanish Paralympic Committee, Iberdrola Foundation, the Spanish Sports Council and the Spanish Ministry of Social Services and Equality. It provided him with €490 for each of the ten academic months of the year.

=== Paralympics ===
Vázquez competed in judo at the 2008 Summer Paralympics and 2012 Summer Paralympics. In London, he finished in fourth place after losing in the bronze medal match.
