= Matthias Krieger =

German Paralympic judoka

Personal information
- Born: August 1, 1984 (age 41) Sinsheim, Germany
- Occupation: Judoka

Sport
- Country: Germany
- Sport: Paralympic judo
Medal record
Paralympic Games
Bronze medal – third place	2012 London	81 kg
IBSA World Judo Championships
Bronze medal – third place	2006 Brommat	-73kg
IBSA European Judo Championships
Silver medal – second place	2011 Crawley	-81kg
Bronze medal – third place	2005 Vlaardingen	-73kg
Bronze medal – third place	2009 Debrecen	-81kg

Profile at external databases
- JudoInside.com: 89790

Matthias Krieger (born 1 August 1984 in Sinsheim) is a German Paralympic judoka. He represented Germany at the 2004 Summer Paralympics, at the 2008 Summer Paralympics and at the 2012 Summer Paralympics. He won a bronze medal in the men's 81 kg event in 2012. In the semi-finals, he lost against Olexandr Kosinov of Ukraine and Kosinov went on to win the gold medal in this event.
