= Eduardo Ávila Sánchez =

Mexican Paralympic judoka

Eduardo Ávila
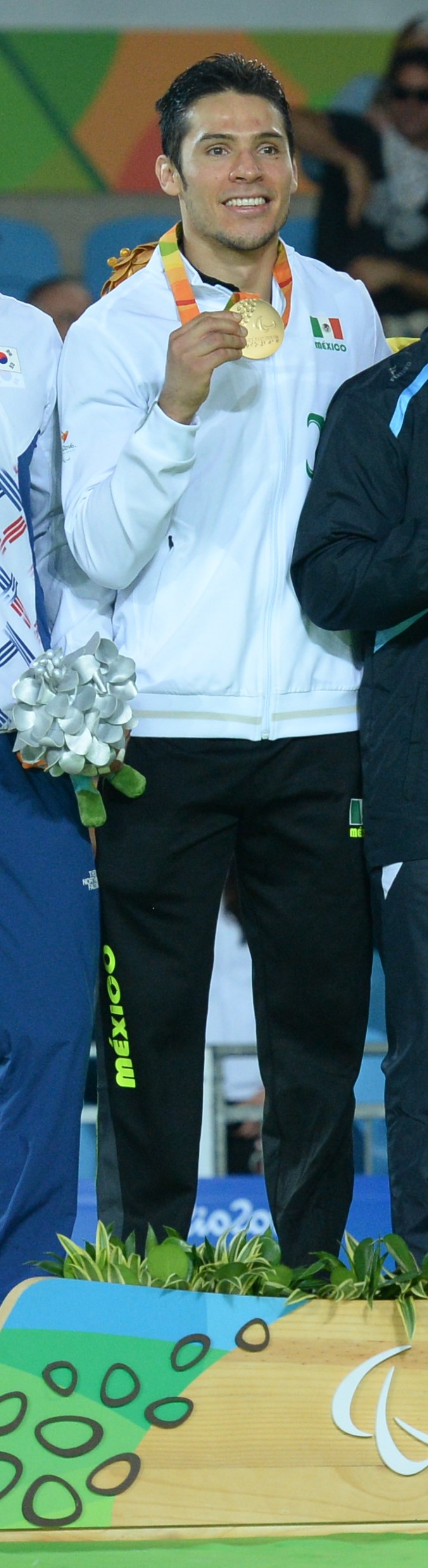
- Ávila at the 2016 Summer Paralympics

Personal information
- Full name: Eduardo Adrián Ávila Sánchez
- Born: 20 December 1986 (age 39) Mexico City, Mexico
- Occupation: Judoka

Sport
- Country: Mexico
- Sport: Para judo
Medal record
Para judo
Representing Mexico
Paralympic Games
Gold medal – first place	2008 Beijing	-73 kg
Gold medal – first place	2016 Rio de Janeiro	-81 kg
Bronze medal – third place	2012 London	-73 kg
Bronze medal – third place	2020 Tokyo	-81 kg
World Championships
Gold medal – first place	2011 Antalya	-81 kg
Gold medal – first place	2014 Colorado Springs	-81 kg
Bronze medal – third place	2015 Seoul	-81kg
Parapan American Games
Gold medal – first place	2007 Rio de Janeiro	-73 kg
Gold medal – first place	2011 Guadalajara	-81 kg
Gold medal – first place	2015 Toronto	-81 kg
Gold medal – first place	2019 Lima	-81 kg
IBSA Pan Am Championships
Gold medal – first place	2018 Calgary	-81 kg
Gold medal – first place	2020 Montreal	-81 kg

Profile at external databases
- IJF: 64943
- JudoInside.com: 43138

Eduardo Adrián Ávila Sánchez (Note: In this Spanish name, the first or paternal surname is Ávila and the second or maternal family name is Sánchez.) (born 20 December 1986) is a Mexican para judoka who competes in international level events. He is two-time Paralympic champion, two-time World champion and a four-time Parapan American Games champion in the middleweight category.

Ávila Sánchez began playing judo when he was eight years old when he watched judo competitions with his father who also encouraged him to take part in the sport. When Ávila Sánchez was 21, he competed in national competitions when he decided to devote his life to judo.
