= Ben Goodrich =

American Paralympic judoka

Benjamin Goodrich
Personal information
- Born: November 26, 1992 (age 33) Saint Paul, Minnesota, U.S.
- Occupation: Judoka

Sport
- Country: United States
- Sport: Para judo
- Disability: Blind
Medal record
Para judo
Representing United States
Paralympic Games
Silver medal – second place	2020 Tokyo	Men's -100kg
Parapan American Games
Silver medal – second place	2019 Lima	Men's +100kg

Profile at external databases
- JudoInside.com: 99684

Benjamin "Ben" Goodrich (born November 26, 1992) is an American Paralympic judoka. He competed in the Men's 100 kg event in the 2021 Tokyo Paralympics where he won a silver medal. He also participated in the 2016 Rio Paralympic Games as a member of Team USA.

His fiancé Nicolina Pernheim is also a Paralympic judoka, they got engaged in 2020 and are now married.
