= Huseyn Rahimli =

Azerbaijani Paralympic judoka

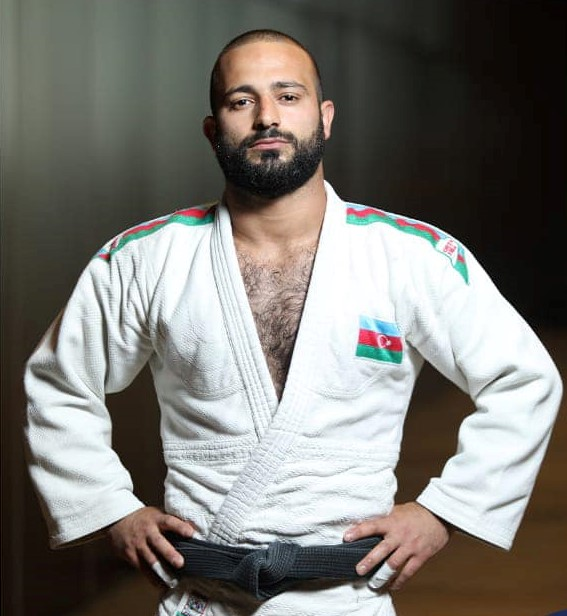

Personal information
- Born: 10 June 1995 (age 31)
- Occupation: Judoka

Sport
- Country: Azerbaijan
- Sport: Judo, Para judo
- Weight class: –73 kg, –81 kg

Achievements and titles
- Paralympic Games: (gold) (2020)
- European Champ.: R32 (2013)
Medal record
Representing Azerbaijan
Men's para judo
Paralympic Games
Gold medal – first place	2020 Tokyo	–81 kg
Men's judo
IJF Grand Slam
Bronze medal – third place	2013 Baku	–73 kg
European U23 Championships
Bronze medal – third place	2014 Wrocław	–73 kg
World Cadets Championships
Bronze medal – third place	2011 Kyiv	–66 kg
European Cadet Championships
Bronze medal – third place	2010 Teplice	–60 kg
Bronze medal – third place	2011 Cottonera	–66 kg
Summer Universiade
Bronze medal – third place	2015 Gwangju	–73 kg

Profile at external databases
- IJF: 7625
- JudoInside.com: 67883
- Updated on 27 November 2022

Huseyn Rahimli (born 10 June 1995) is an Azerbaijani para judoka. He won the gold medal in the men's 81 kg event at the 2020 Summer Paralympics held in Tokyo, Japan.
