= Lee Jung-min =

South Korean Paralympic judoka

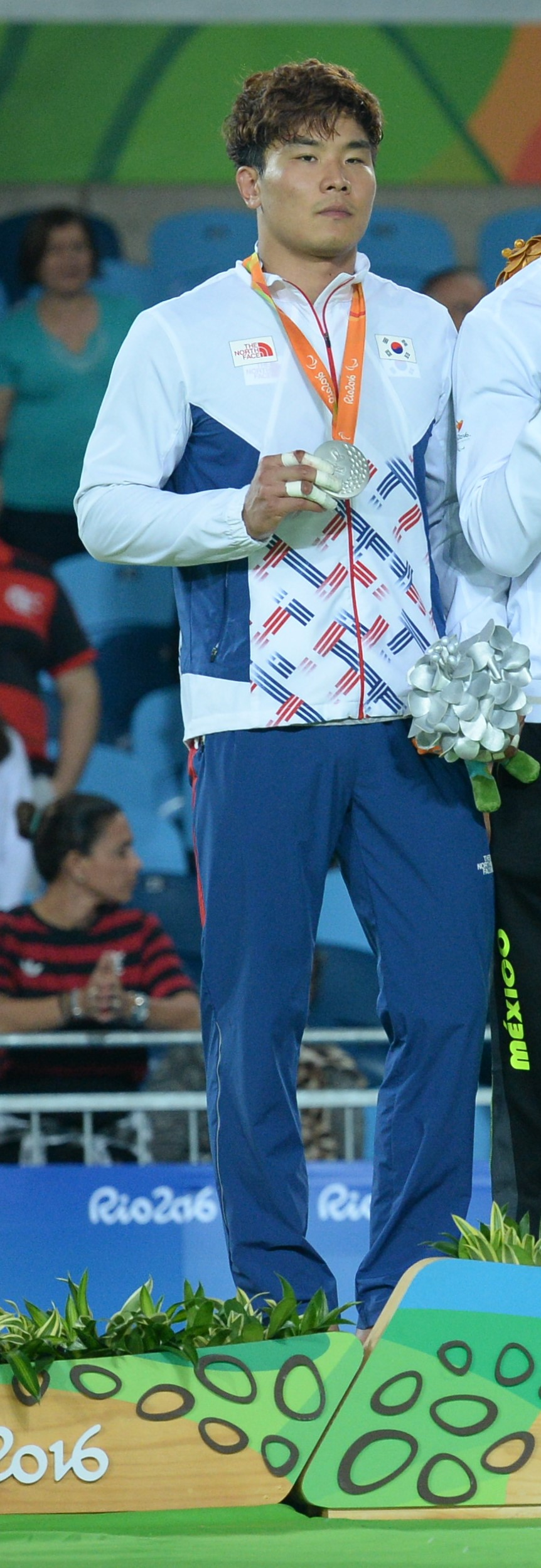
- Lee at the 2016 Summer Paralympics

Personal information
- Born: 13 November 1990 (age 35)

Sport
- Country: South Korea
- Sport: Paralympic judo
Medal record
Men's Paralympic judo
Representing South Korea
Paralympic Games
Silver medal – second place	2016 Rio de Janeiro	81 kg
Asian Para Games
Gold medal – first place	2018 Jakarta	81 kg
Silver medal – second place	2022 Hangzhou	90 kg
Gold medal – first place	2018 Jakarta	Team

Lee Jung-min (Korean: 이정민; born 13 November 1990) is a South Korean Paralympic judoka.

== Career ==
He represented South Korea at the 2016 Summer Paralympics held in Rio de Janeiro, Brazil and he won the silver medal in the men's 81 kg event.

In 2018, he represented South Korea at the Asian Para Games held in Jakarta, Indonesia and he won the gold medal in the men's 81 kg event. He also won the gold medal in the men's team event.
