= Myles Porter =

American Paralympic judoka (born 1985)

Personal information
- Nationality: American
- Born: November 22, 1985 (age 40) Fremont, Ohio, U.S.
- Height: 6 ft 2 in (188 cm)
Medal record
Men's judo
Representing United States
Paralympic Games
Silver medal – second place	2012 London	100 kg
Parapan American Games
Bronze medal – third place	2007 Rio de Janeiro	100 kg
Gold medal – first place	2011 Guadalajara	100 kg
Rendez Vous
Bronze medal – third place	2009 Montreal	100 kg
German Open for Blind & Visually Impaired
Gold medal – first place	2009 Heidelberg	100 kg
Gold medal – first place	2010 Heidelberg	100 kg
Gold medal – first place	2011 Heidelberg	100 kg
Lithuanian Open for Blind & Visually Impaired
Gold medal – first place	2010 Vilnius	100 kg
USA Senior National Judo Championships
Silver medal – second place	2010 Myrtle Beach	100 kg
IBSA World Judo Championships
Bronze medal – third place	2011 Antalya	100 kg

Myles Porter (born November 22, 1985) is an American Paralympic judoka.

== Biography ==
Myles was born in Fremont, Ohio and is currently attending University of Toledo. He was a 2007 bronze medalist at Parapan American Games and 2009 one too at Rendez-Vous, Montreal, Canada. He was a three-time golden medalist at German Open for Blind & Visually Impairment, Germany between 2009 and 2011. During both 2010 and 2011 respectively he won bronze medal as well, for his participation at IBSA World Judo Championships in Antalya, Turkey. In the same 2010 he was a gold medalist at Lithuanian Open for Blind & Visually Impaired which was held at the capital of Lithuania, Vilnius. In 2011 he pushed his limits at Parapan American Games and this time won a gold medal. At the 2012 Paralympic Games he won a silver medal for 100 kilograms (220 lb).
