= Sharif Khalilov =

Uzbekistani Paralympic judoka (born 1989)

Personal information
- Born: 28 October 1989 (age 37)

Sport
- Country: Uzbekistan
- Sport: Paralympic judo
Medal record
Paralympic Games
Silver medal – second place	2012 London	73 kg
Bronze medal – third place	2020 Tokyo	100 kg
Asian Para Games
Gold medal – first place	2014 Incheon	81 kg
Silver medal – second place	2010 Guangzhou	73 kg
Bronze medal – third place	2018 Jakarta	100 kg
Bronze medal – third place	2018 Jakarta	Team

Sharif Khalilov (born 28 October 1989) is an Uzbekistani Paralympic judoka. He represented Uzbekistan at the Summer Paralympics in 2012, 2016 and 2020 and he won the silver medal in the men's 73 kg event in 2012. He also won one of the bronze medals in the men's 100 kg event at the 2020 Summer Paralympics held in Tokyo, Japan.

== Career ==
Khalilov competes in the visually impaired category of para judo. In the 2012 Summer Paralympics in London, United Kingdom, Khalilov made his Paralympic debut in the 73 kg weight class. He won a silver medal, losing to Ukraine's Dmytro Solovey in the final. In doing so, he won Uzbekistan's first ever Paralympic medal. Upon returning to Uzbekistan, he was honoured at the Olympic Glory Museum in Tashkent. He was given $75,000, a Daewoo Lacetti car and a flat in Bukhara. At the 2016 Summer Paralympics in Rio de Janeiro, Brazil, Khalilov competed in the 81 kg weight class but he lost in the first round to Great Britain's Jonathan Drane. At the IBSA Judo World Championships in 2018, Khalilov lost to Drane again, this time in 3 seconds to an ippon.

At the 2020 Summer Paralympics in Tokyo, Japan, Khalilov competed in the 100 kg weight class. Khalilov won a bronze medal and was rewarded back in Uzbekistan with $50,000, a Chevrolet Trailblazer car and a 2 bedroom apartment. In 2023, he moved down to the 90 kg weight class following a recategorisation of weight classes. He did not compete at the 2024 Summer Paralympics in Paris, France.
