= José Effron =

Argentine Paralympic judoka

Personal information
- Full name: José David Effron
- Born: 24 July 1986 (age 39) Chamical, Argentina
- Occupation: Judoka
- Height: 1.79 m (5 ft 10 in)

Sport
- Country: Argentina
- Sport: Paralympic judo
Medal record
Paralympic judo
Representing Argentina
Paralympic Games
| Silver medal – second place | 2012 London | -81 kg |
IBSA World Games
| Bronze medal – third place | 2011 Antalya | -81 kg |
Parapan American Games
| Gold medal – first place | 2011 Guadalajara | -81 kg |
| Silver medal – second place | 2015 Toronto | -81 kg |
IBSA Pan Am Championships
| Silver medal – second place | 2018 Calgary | -81 kg |

José David Effron (born 24 July 1986) is an Argentine Paralympic judoka who competes in international level events. He is a Paralympic silver medalist at the 2012 Summer Paralympics and a double Parapan American Games medalist.
