= Doniyor Saliev =

Uzbekistani Paralympic athlete

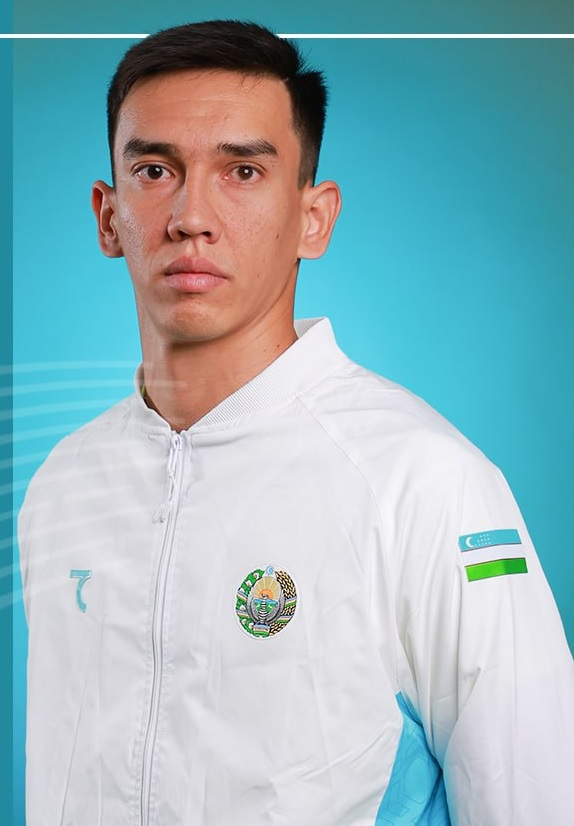

Sport
- Country: Uzbekistan
- Sport: Para-athletics
- Disability: Vision impairment
- Disability class: T12
- Events: Long jump; Triple jump
Medal record
Paralympic Games
Silver medal – second place	2024 Paris	Long jump T12
Bronze medal – third place	2016 Rio de Janeiro	Long jump T12
Bronze medal – third place	2016 Rio de Janeiro	4 × 100 m relay T11–13
World Championships
Gold medal – first place	2017 London	Long jump T12
Gold medal – first place	2019 Dubai	Long jump T12
Gold medal – first place	2023 Paris	Long jump T12
Silver medal – second place	2013 Lyon	Triple jump T12
Islamic Solidarity Games
Gold medal – first place	2017 Baku	Long jump T12
Asian Para Games
Gold medal – first place	2018 Jakarta	Long jump T12
Gold medal – first place	2022 Hangzhou	Long jump T12
Bronze medal – third place	2010 Guangzhou	Long jump F13

Doniyor Saliev is a visually impaired Uzbekistani Paralympic athlete competing in T12-classification events. He is a three-time medalist at the Summer Paralympics. He is also a three-time gold medalist in the men's long jump T12 event at the World Para Athletics Championships.

== Career ==
At the 2010 Asian Para Games held in Guangzhou, China, Saliev won the bronze medal in the men's long jump F13 event. He represented Uzbekistan at the 2012 Summer Paralympics in London, United Kingdom and at the 2016 Summer Paralympics in Rio de Janeiro, Brazil. He won the bronze medal in the men's long jump T12 event and the bronze medal in the men's 4 × 100 metres relay T11–13 event at the 2016 Summer Paralympics. Saliev was also the flag bearer in the opening ceremony of the 2016 Summer Paralympics.

At the 2017 Islamic Solidarity Games held in Baku, Azerbaijan, Saliev won the gold medal in the men's long jump T12 event. In 2019, he qualified to represent Uzbekistan at the 2020 Summer Paralympics in Tokyo, Japan after winning the gold medal in the men's long jump T12 event at the World Para Athletics Championships in Dubai, United Arab Emirates. He competed in the men's long jump T12 event.

He won the gold medal in the men's long jump T12 event at the 2023 World Para Athletics Championships held in Paris, France.

== Achievements ==
=== Track ===
Year	Competition	Venue	Position	Event	Notes
2016	Summer Paralympics	Rio de Janeiro, Brazil	3rd	4 × 100 metres relay	43.47 s

=== Field ===
Year	Competition	Venue	Position	Event	Notes
2016	Summer Paralympics	Rio de Janeiro, Brazil	3rd	Long jump T12	7.04 m
