= Judo at the 2012 Summer Paralympics – Men's 73 kg =

Judo – Men's 73 kg at the XIV Paralympic Games
- Venue: ExCeL London
- Date: 31 August 2012
- Competitors: 8 from 8 nations

Medalists
1st place, gold medalist(s)		Dmytro Solovey	Ukraine
2nd place, silver medalist(s)		Sharif Khalilov	Uzbekistan
3rd place, bronze medalist(s)		Shakhban Kurbanov	Russia
3rd place, bronze medalist(s)		Eduardo Ávila Sánchez	Mexico

The men's 73 kg judo competition at the 2012 Summer Paralympics was held on 31 August at ExCeL London.

== Results ==
=== Gold Medal Contest ===
Semifinals
1	D Solovey (UKR)	1023
4	E Ávila Sánchez (MEX)	0102
3	S Kurbanov (RUS)	000
2	S Khalilov (UZB)	100

Final
D Solovey (UKR)	100
S Khalilov (UZB)	000

=== Bronze Medal Contest ===
==== Contest A ====
Repechage contest
M Ali Shanani (IRI)	1103
M Powell (GBR)	0101

Finals of Repechage
M Ali Shanani (IRI)	0001
H Takahashi (JPN)	100

Bronze Medal Contest
H Takahashi (JPN)	000
S Kurbanov (RUS)	100

==== Contest B ====
Repechage contest
M Briceno (VEN)	102
R Ramirez (ARG)	000

Finals of Repechage
H-İ Önel (TUR)	0002
M Briceno (VEN)	112

Bronze Medal Contest
M Briceno (VEN)	0013
E Ávila Sánchez (MEX)	0101

=== Table Contest ===
==== Table A ====
Preliminaries		Quarterfinals		Semifinals
		M Powell (GBR)	000
D Solovey (UKR)	101	D Solovey (UKR)	101
M Ali Shanani (IRI)	000			D Solovey (UKR)	1023
H Takahashi (JPN)	111			E Ávila Sánchez (MEX)	0102
A Kazlou (BLR)	0001	H Takahashi (JPN)	0001
		E Ávila Sánchez (MEX)	0021

==== Table B ====
Preliminaries
H-İ Önel (TUR)	101
S Junk (GER)	010
M Briceno (VEN)	000
S Khalilov (UZB)	110

Quarterfinals
H-İ Önel (TUR)	0001
S Kurbanov (RUS)	100
S Khalilov (UZB)	100
R Ramirez (ARG)	000

Semifinals
S Kurbanov (RUS)	000
S Khalilov (UZB)	100
