= Chris Skelley =

British judoka (born 1993)

Christopher Peter Hunt Skelley MBE
Personal information
- Full name: Christopher Peter Hunt Skelley
- Nationality: British
- Born: Christopher Peter Skelley; 9 July 1993 (age 32) Nottingham, Great Britain
- Occupation: Judoka

Sport
- Country: Britain
- Sport: Para judo
- Event: –100 kg
- Club: Walsall Centre of Excellence; Haltemprice Judo

Achievements and titles
- Paralympic Games: 2016 Rio
Medal record
Representing Great Britain
Men's para judo
Paralympic Games
Gold medal – first place	2020 Tokyo	100kg
Bronze medal – third place	2024 Paris	+90 kg
IBSA World Championships
Gold medal – first place	2018 Odivelas	100 kg
IBSA European Championships
Gold medal – first place	2017 Walsall	100 kg
Bronze medal – third place	2015 Lisbon	100 kg
Bronze medal – third place	2019 Genoa	100 kg
European Para Championships
Silver medal – second place	2023 Rotterdam	+90 kg

Profile at external databases
- JudoInside.com: 72204

Christopher Peter Hunt Skelley (born 9 July 1993) is a British former Paralympic judoka who competes in the visually impaired under 100 kg category. In 2016 it was announced that he has been selected to represent Great Britain at the 2016 Summer Paralympics in Rio. In 2021 Chris became Paralympic champion after winning Gold in the -100 kg category in the Tokyo Paralympics. In 2024, Chris became a Paralympic bronze medalist in the +90 kg category in the Paris 2024 Paralympics.

== Personal history ==
Skelley was born in Nottingham and raised in Kingston Upon Hull. As a youth he was a keen athlete and enjoyed many sports playing rugby for Hull Ionians. After leaving school he took a job at a local garage, but it was noticed that his eyesight was deteriorating. He was diagnosed with ocular albinism. Skelley is married to Louise Hunt.

== Judo career ==
Skelley took up judo as a sport at the age of five. A successful judoka, he was already part of the England squad when his eyesight began to fail. He slowly began to focus more on his judo and was brought onto the Great Britain visually impaired team. Competing in the under 100 kg category, Skelley took three bronze medals at the under-20 national tournament between 2010 and 2013. In 2014 he represented his country at the Scottish Open, taking gold in his division. The same year he won silver in the Welsh Senior Open.

In December 2015 Skelley represented Britain at the IBSA European Judo Championship in Portugal. There he missed out on the final after being beaten by a last second yuko scoring throw by his Russian opponent Abdula Kuramagomedov, the current world medalist. Skelley secured the bronze by beating Ibrahim Bolukbasi of Turkey. In February 2016 Skelly was selected as part of a four-man to compete for Great Britain at the 2016 Summer Paralympics in Rio, along with Sam Ingram, Jack Hodgson and Jonathan Drane. In the build-up to the Games, Skelley and his three team-mates travelled to Rio in early March to take part in a Judo Grand Prix competition. Skelley took bronze in his match in a contest which featured many of the competitors who had already qualified for the Summer Paralympics.

Skelley was appointed Member of the Order of the British Empire (MBE) in the 2022 New Year Honours for services to judo. He announced his retirement in February 2025.
