= Davurkhon Karomatov =

Uzbekistani Paralympic judoka (born 1998)

Personal information
- Born: 25 October 1998 (age 27) Uzbekistan
- Occupation: Judoka

Sport
- Country: Uzbekistan
- Sport: Para judo
- Disability class: J2
- Weight class: 90 kg
Medal record
Men's para judo
Representing Uzbekistan
Paralympic Games
Silver medal – second place	2020 Tokyo	81 kg
Bronze medal – third place	2024 Paris	90 kg J2

Profile at external databases
- IJF: 64946
- JudoInside.com: 115458

Davurkhon Karomatov (born 25 October 1998) is an Uzbekistani Paralympic judoka. He won the silver medal in the men's 81 kg event at the 2020 Summer Paralympics held in Tokyo, Japan. He also won bronze in the men's 90 kg J2 event at the 2024 Summer Paralympics held in Paris, France.
