= Daniel Powell (judoka, born 1991) =

British para judoka (born 1991)

Personal information
- Born: 4 May 1991 (age 35) Liverpool
- Home town: Liverpool, England
- Spouse: Lea Powell (2026-present)

Sport
- Sport: Para judo
- Disability class: J1
- Weight class: 90 kg, 95 kg
Medal record
Men's para judo
Representing Great Britain
Paralympic Games
Silver medal – second place	2024 Paris	90 kg J1
IBSA Judo World Championships
Gold medal – first place	2025 Astana	95 kg J1
Silver medal – second place	2022 Baku	90 kg J1
European Para Championships
Gold medal – first place	2025 Tbilisi	95 kg J1
Silver medal – second place	2023 Rotterdam	90 kg J1

Daniel Powell (born 4 May 1991) is a British para judoka. He has competed in three Paralympic Games (2012, 2020, 2024), winning at silver medal at the Paris 2024 Summer Paralympics.

In 2025, Powell went on to become World and European Champion.
