= Fakhriddin Khamraev =

Uzbekistani Paralympic athlete (born 1989)

Personal information
- Born: 28 July 1989 (age 37)

Sport
- Country: Uzbekistan
- Sport: Para-athletics
- Disability: Vision impairment
- Disability class: T12, T13
- Events: 4 × 100 metres relay; 200 metres; 400 metres; 800 metres; 1500 metres
Medal record
Paralympic Games
Bronze medal – third place	2016 Rio de Janeiro	4 × 100 m relay T11–13
World Championships
Gold medal – first place	2025 New Delhi	400m T12
Silver medal – second place	2015 Doha	4 × 100 metres relay T11-13
Asian Para Games
Gold medal – first place	2014 Incheon	200 m T13
Gold medal – first place	2014 Incheon	400 m T13
Gold medal – first place	2014 Incheon	800 m T13
Gold medal – first place	2018 Jakarta	1500 m T12/T13

Fakhriddin Khamraev (born 28 July 1989) is a visually impaired Uzbekistani Paralympic athlete competing in T12 and T13 classification sprinting events. He is a medalist at the Summer Paralympics and a two-time medalist at the World Para Athletics Championships. He is also a four-time gold medalist at the Asian Para Games.

== Career ==
At the 2014 Asian Para Games held in Incheon, South Korea, Khamraev won the gold medal in the 200 m, 400 m and 800 m T13 events. He competed at the 2015 IPC Athletics World Championships in the men's 4 × 100 metres relay T11-13, winning a silver medal. He represented Uzbekistan at the 2016 Summer Paralympics in Rio de Janeiro, Brazil. He won the bronze medal in the men's 4 × 100 metres relay T11–13 event. At the 2018 Asian Para Games held in Jakarta, Indonesia, Khamraev won the gold medal in the 1500 m T12/T13 event.

Khamraev competed at the 2025 World Para Athletics Championships held in New Delhi, India, where he won the gold medal in the men's 400 metres T12 event.
