= Rovshan Safarov =

Azerbaijani Paralympic judoka

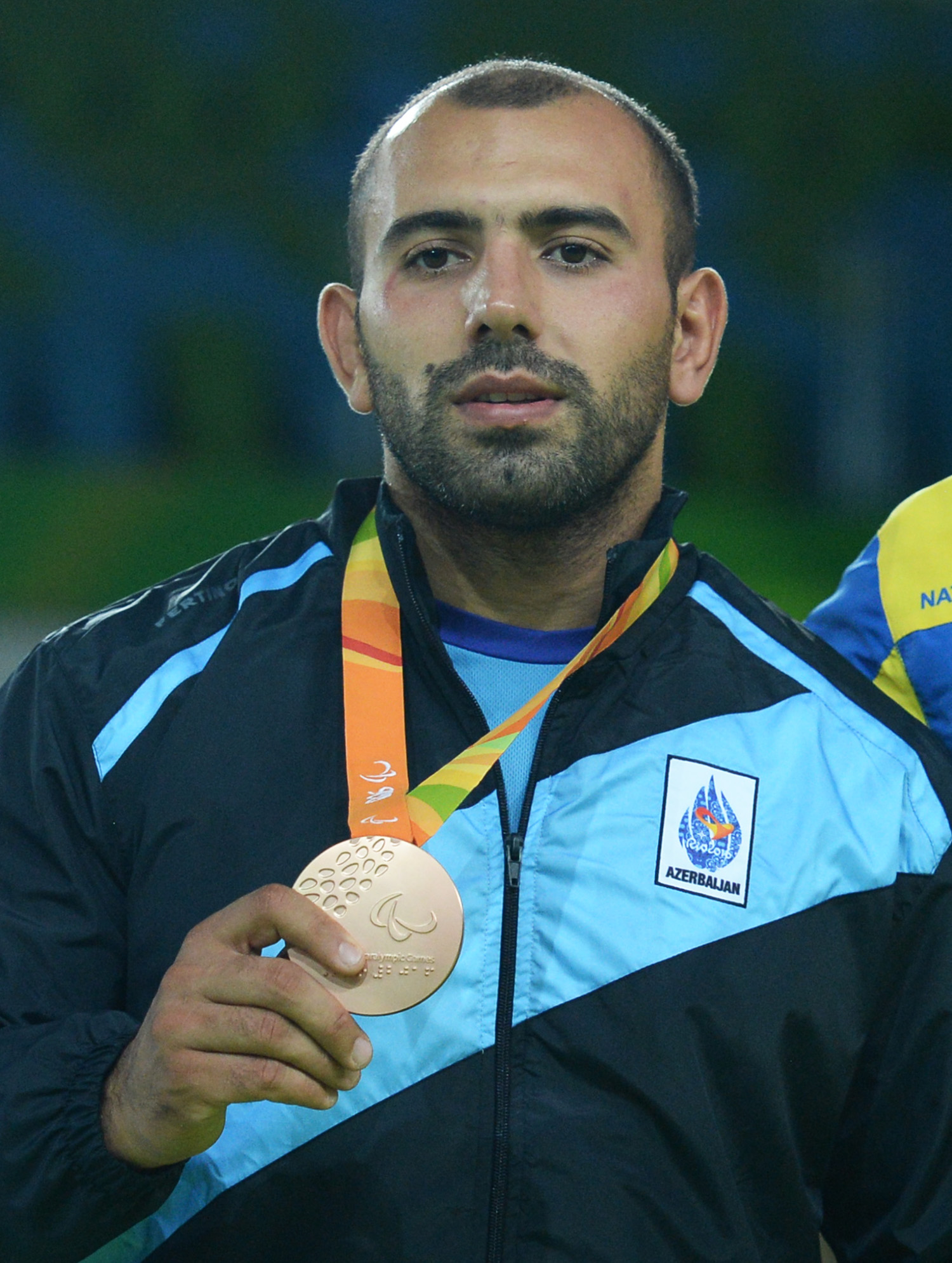

Personal information
- Native name: Rövşən Səfərov
- Born: 3 May 1988 (age 38)

Sport
- Country: Azerbaijan
- Sport: Paralympic judo
Medal record
Paralympic Games
| Bronze medal – third place | 2016 Rio de Janeiro | 81 kg |
Islamic Solidarity Games
| Bronze medal – third place | 2017 Baku | 90 kg |

Rovshan Safarov (Azerbaijani: Rövşən Səfərov, born 3 May 1988) is an Azerbaijani Paralympic judoka. He represented Azerbaijan at the 2012 Summer Paralympics and at the 2016 Summer Paralympics and won one of the bronze medals in the men's 81 kg event in 2016.

He also won a bronze medal at the 2017 Islamic Solidarity Games in the men's −90 kg event.
