= Choi Gwang-geun =

South Korean Paralympic judoka (born 1987)

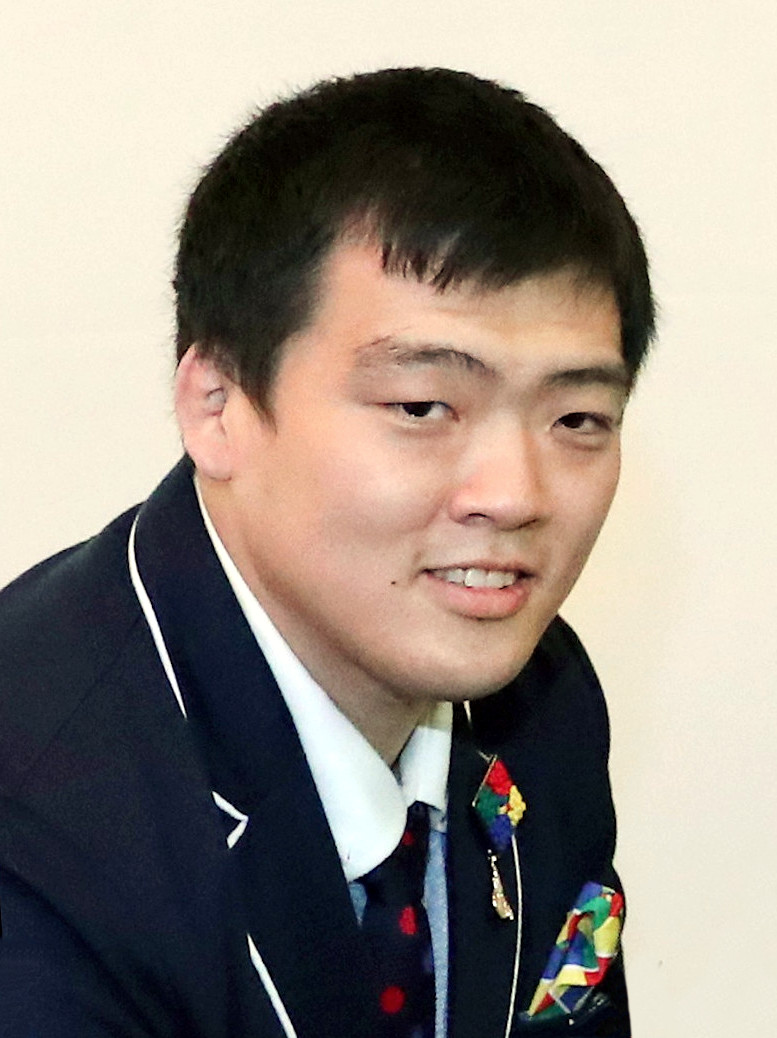
- Choi Gwang-geun (2016)

Personal information
- Born: 3 December 1987 (age 38) Jumunjin, Gangneung, South Korea
- Occupation: Judoka

Sport
- Country: South Korea
- Sport: Paralympic judo
Medal record
Paralympic Games
Gold medal – first place	2012 London	100 kg
Gold medal – first place	2016 Rio de Janeiro	100 kg
Bronze medal – third place	2020 Tokyo	+100 kg
Asian Para Games
Gold medal – first place	2014 Incheon	100 kg
Gold medal – first place	2018 Jakarta	Team
Silver medal – second place	2018 Jakarta	100 kg

Profile at external databases
- JudoInside.com: 24306

Choi Gwang-geun (Korean: 최광근; born 3 December 1987) is a South Korean retired Paralympic judoka. He represented South Korea at the Summer Paralympics in 2012, 2016 and 2021 and he won three medals: the gold medal in the men's 100 kg event in 2012, the gold medal in the men's 100 kg event in 2016 and the bronze medal in the men's +100 kg event in 2021.

In 2018, he won the silver medal in the men's 100 kg event at the Asian Para Games held in Jakarta, Indonesia. He also won the gold medal in the men's team event.

In 2022, Choi retired from the sport after winning his bronze medal at the 2020 Summer Paralympics.
