= Uzbekistan at the 2004 Summer Paralympics =

- IPC code: UZB
- NPC: Uzbekistan National Paralympic Association

in Athens
- Competitors: 1 in 1 sport
- Flag bearer: Yusup Kadyrov
- Medals Ranked 76th: Gold 0 Silver 0 Bronze 0 Total 0

Summer Paralympics appearances (overview)
- 2004; 2008; 2012; 2016; 2020; 2024

Other related appearances
- Soviet Union (1988); Unified Team (1992)

Uzbekistan competed at the 2004 Summer Paralympics in Athens, Greece. The team included one athlete, but won no medals.

== Sports ==
=== Powerlifting ===
Athlete	Event	Result	Rank
Yusup Kadyrov	75kg	NMR	

== See also ==
- Uzbekistan at the Paralympics
- Uzbekistan at the 2004 Summer Olympics
