= Shakhban Kurbanov =

Russian Paralympic judoka

Sport
- Country: Russia
- Sport: Paralympic judo
Medal record
Paralympic Games
Bronze medal – third place	2012 London	73 kg

Shakhban Kurbanov is a Russian Paralympic judoka. He represented Russia at the 2008 Summer Paralympics and at the 2012 Summer Paralympics and he won the bronze medal in the men's 73 kg event in 2012.

He won the silver medal in the men's 70 kg event at the 2015 IBSA World Games.
