= Olexandr Kosinov =

Ukrainian Paralympic judoka

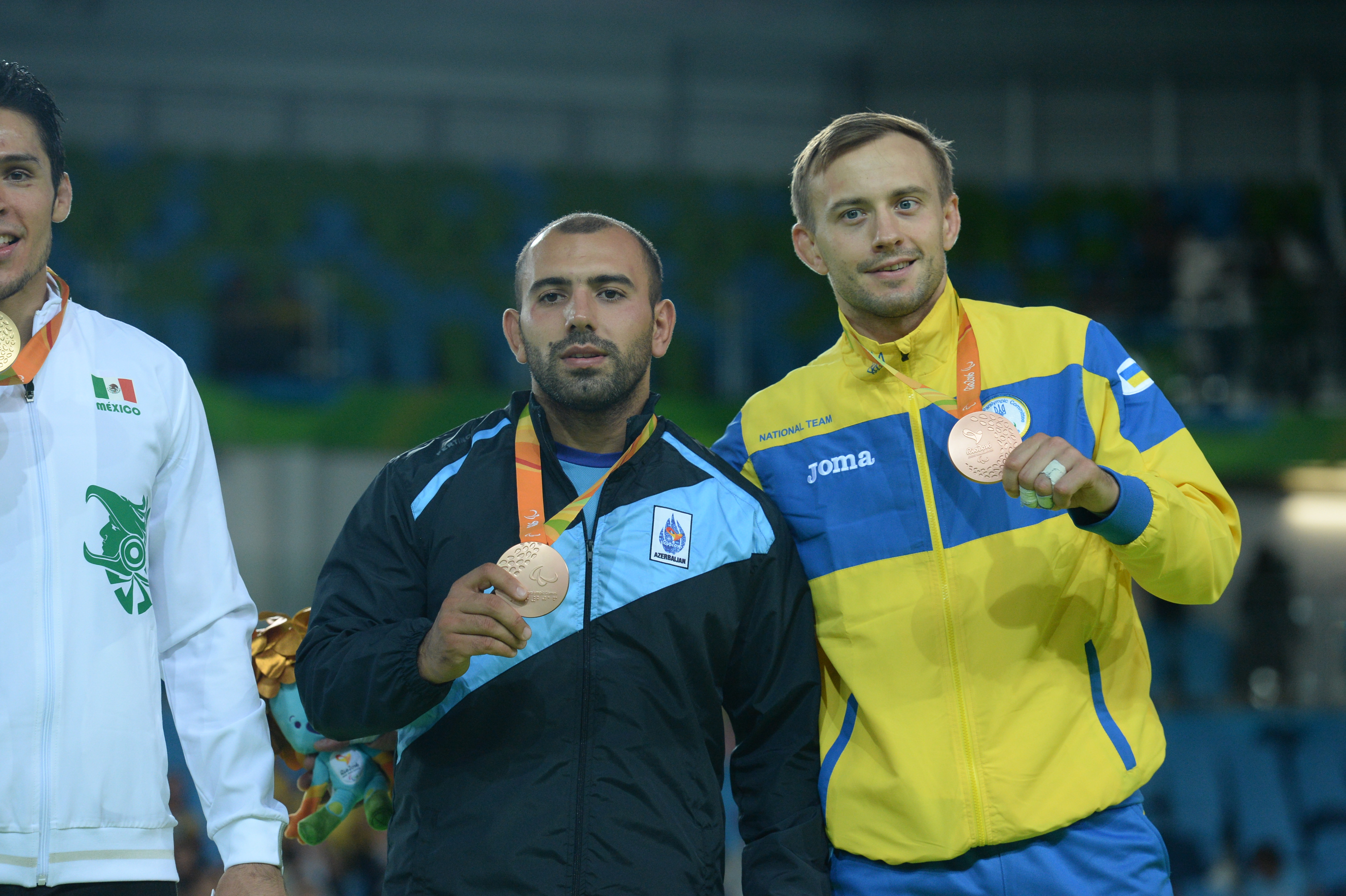
- Kosinov (right) at the 2016 Summer Paralympics

Personal information
- Born: 1 July 1983 (age 42)
- Occupation: Judoka

Sport
- Country: Ukraine
- Sport: Paralympic judo
Medal record
Men's Paralympic judo
Representing Ukraine
Paralympic Games
Gold medal – first place	2012 London	81 kg
Bronze medal – third place	2016 Rio de Janeiro	81 kg

Olexandr Kosinov (born 1 July 1983) is a Ukrainian Paralympic judoka. He represented Ukraine at the 2012 Summer Paralympics and at the 2016 Summer Paralympics and he won two medals: the gold medal in the men's 81 kg event in 2012 and the bronze medal in the men's 81 kg event in 2016.

At the 2015 IBSA European Judo Championships held in Odivelas, Portugal, he won the gold medal in the men's 81 kg event.
