= Shirin Sharipov =

Uzbekistani Paralympic judoka (born 1989)

Personal information
- Born: 18 December 1989 (age 36)
- Occupation: Judoka

Sport
- Country: Uzbekistan
- Sport: Paralympic judo
Medal record
Paralympic Games
Bronze medal – third place	2016 Rio de Janeiro	100 kg
Islamic Solidarity Games
Gold medal – first place	2017 Baku	+100 kg
Asian Para Games
Gold medal – first place	2018 Jakarta	+100 kg
Bronze medal – third place	2014 Incheon	100 kg

Profile at external databases
- JudoInside.com: 99629

Shirin Sharipov (born 18 December 1989) is an Uzbekistani Paralympic judoka. He represented Uzbekistan at the 2016 Summer Paralympics held in Rio de Janeiro, Brazil and won the bronze medal in the men's 100 kg event.

He also won the gold medal in the men's +100 kg event at the 2017 Islamic Solidarity Games in Baku, Azerbaijan and the men's +100 kg event at the 2018 Asian Para Games in Jakarta, Indonesia.
