= Jonathan Drane =

British Paralympic judoka

Personal information
- Nickname: Jono
- Nationality: British
- Born: 11 February 1987 (age 39)

Sport
- Country: Great Britain
- Sport: Judo
- Event: –81 kg
Medal record
Representing Great Britain
IBSA World Championships
Bronze medal – third place	2014 Colorado	81 kg

Jonathan "Jono" Drane (born 11 February 1987) is a British Paralympic judoka who competes in the visually impaired under 81 kg category. In 2014 he took bronze in the International Blind Sports Association Judo World Championships, and in 2016 it was announced that he has been selected to represent Great Britain at the 2016 Summer Paralympics in Rio.

== Personal history ==
Drane was born in 1987. Drane was a plumber with his own business but in 2011, after a routine eye check, it was discovered that he had corneal dystrophy which led to a deterioration in his eyesight, which eventually impacted on his work.

== Judo career ==
Drane took to judo as a youth, stating he found it easy to concentrate on the sport. He reached his 1st Dan at the age of 18 and represented the senior Great Britain team at competition. After the deterioration of his eyesight he turned to visually impaired judo and competed in the under 73 kg class. His first major senior medal at international level was a bronze in the Welsh Open in 2010. In March 2012 Drane won a bronze in the English Open and followed this a month later with a gold in the Northern Ireland Open.

In 2015 Drane traveled to Colorado in the United States to compete with the British team at the Blind Sports Association Judo World Championships. Drane ended as Britain's only medalist of the competition with a bronze, losing to two penalties in the semi-final to Paralympic bronze medallist Eduardo Avila-Sanchez of Mexico. In the bronze medal play off he beat Cuba's Alonzo Cruz by an ippon to claim his medal. In February 2016 Drane was named as part of the four-man team to travel to Rio to represent Great Britain at the 2016 Summer Paralympics.
