= Dmytro Solovey =

Ukrainian Paralympic judoka (born 1993)

Personal information
- Born: 28 September 1993 (age 32)
- Occupation: Judoka

Sport
- Country: Ukraine
- Sport: Para judo
- Disability: Vision impairment
Medal record
Men's para judo
Representing Ukraine
Paralympic Games
Gold medal – first place	2012 London	73 kg
Silver medal – second place	2016 Rio de Janeiro	73 kg

Profile at external databases
- IJF: 64945
- JudoInside.com: 57589

Dmytro Solovey (Ukrainian: Дмитро Сергійович Соловей; born 28 September 1993) is a visually impaired Ukrainian Paralympic judoka. He represented Ukraine at the Summer Paralympics in 2012, 2016 and 2021, winning two medals: the gold medal in the men's 73 kg event in 2012 and the silver medal in the men's 73 kg event in 2016.

In 2015, he won the silver medal in the men's 73 kg event at the 2015 IBSA European Judo Championships.
